= Sagardighi =

Sagardighi may refer to:

- Sagardighi, Bangladesh, a village
- Sagardighi (community development block), Murshidabad, West Bengal, India
- Sagardighi, Murshidabad, a town in Sagardighi CD block
- Sagardighi Assembly constituency, in Murshidabad
- Sagardighi (Cooch Behar, India), a lake in West Bengal
