= Samar Deb =

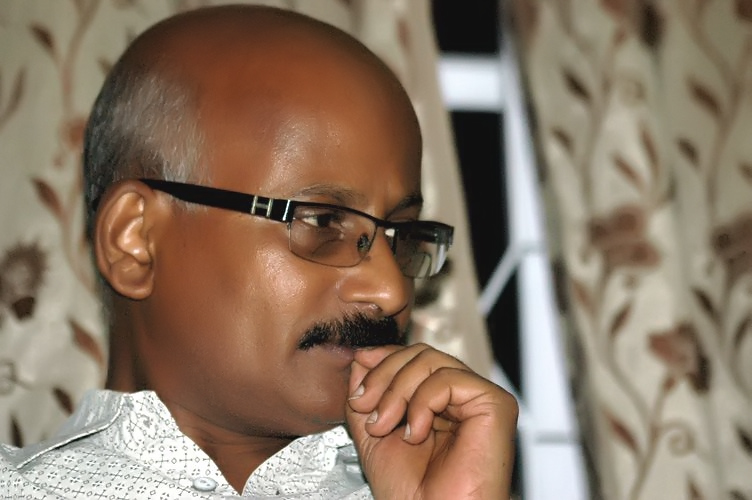
- Born: 1 November 1963 (age 62); Coochbehar, West Bengal, India
- Education: A.B.N. Seal College
- Occupation: Chief Sub-Editor
- Spouse: Kabita Ghosh
- Writing career
- Language: Bengali
- Notable work: Lohit Parer Upakatha

Samar Deb (born 1 November 1963) is an Indian Bengali writer and poet. He was born in Coochbehar, West Bengal. He is the youngest child of Satish Chandra Deb and Sabita Deb.

He is most known for his classic novel, Lohitpader Upakatha (2010).

== List of major works ==
- Yayati – A Collection of Poems (Published – 1986)
- Ek Yug Atmapratarana – Novel (Published – 2003)
- Amma Tera Munda – A Collection of Poems (Published – 2004)
- Ekti Golper Suluk Sandhan (Novel) (Published – 2006)
- Aalo Andhakar – A Collection of Poems (Published – 2006)
- Lohitparer Upakatha – Novel(Published – 2010)
- Neel Andhakar – Novel (Published – 2012)
- Amrita Jatra – Collection of Essays (Published – 2016)
- NRC র পর ও অন্যান্য গল্প (Published - 2023)
