= Cooch Behar College =

College in West Bengal, India

- Type: Public college
- Established: 1970; 56 years ago
- Academic affiliations: Cooch Behar Panchanan Barma University
- Principal: Dr. Pankaj Kumar Debanath
- Location: No.2, Kalighat Rd Number 1, Cooch Behar, West Bengal, 736101, India; 26°19′01.48″N 89°27′25.19″E
- Campus: Urban
- Language: English, Bengali
- Website: Cooch Behar College
- Location within West Bengal Location within India

Cooch Behar College is an undergraduate college located in Cooch Behar, in the Indian state of West Bengal. It was established in 1970 and offers Bachelor's Degree in Science (BSC), Commerce (B.Com) and Arts (BA). The college is affiliated to Cooch Behar Panchanan Barma University. In 2016 the college has been awarded B++ grade by the National Assessment and Accreditation Council. The college is recognized by the University Grants Commission (UGC).

== Courses offered ==
- Add-On Course
- B.A. Honours : Geography, Philosophy, History, Bengali, Economics, English, Political Science, Sanskrit
- B.Com. Honours : Accountancy
- B.Sc.Honours : Mathematics, Computer Science, Chemistry, Physics
- BBA
- Bachelor of Business Management, BBM-TAH in Service Sector Sector like

Tourism industry, Aviation Industry & Hospitality Management

- COP: Eco Tourism and Management, Women Studies, Communicative English, [[Computer Applications
- M.Sc: Geography
- M.A: English
- UGC-NSQF Course: Certificate & Diploma Course in Geoinformatics

== See also ==
- List of institutions of higher education in West Bengal
- Education in India
- Education in West Bengal
