= Cooch Behar Stadium =

Stadium in West Bengal, India

- Rajbari Stadium
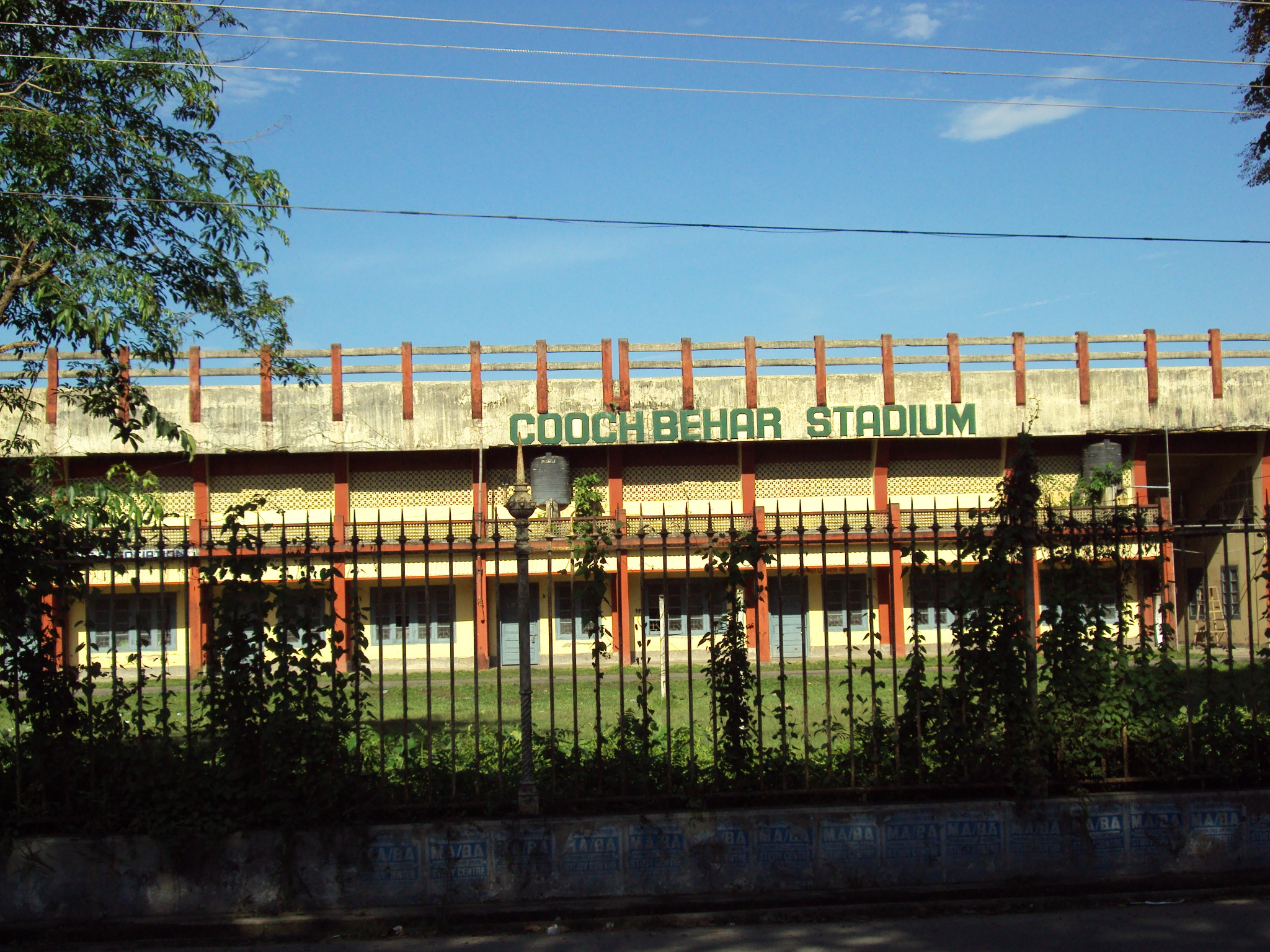
- Cooch Behar Stadium
- Interactive map of Cooch Behar Stadium
- Full name: Cooch Behar Stadium
- Location: Cooch Behar, Bengal
- Coordinates: 26°19′29″N 89°26′26″E
- Capacity: 5,000

Construction
- Groundbreaking: 2008
- Opened: 2008

Website
- cricketarchive

Cooch Behar Stadium is a multi-purpose stadium in Cooch Behar, Bengal. The ground is mainly used for organizing matches of football, cricket and other sports. The ground does not have any floodlights so the stadium cannot host day-night matches. It was made considering all norms of BCCI so that Ranji Trophy matches can be played. The stadium was established in 2008 when they hosted a match of Vijay Merchant Trophy between Gujarat Under-19s and Jharkhand Under-19s.

== History ==
The stadium was constructed in the 1990s on land that originally hosted a playground established by Maharaja Jagdipendra Narayan Bhup Bahadur in 1950. The location’s historical significance, coupled with its proximity to the royal palace, adds cultural value to the venue.

== Facilities ==
The stadium includes:

- Two spectator galleries
- Indoor stadium
- Swimming pool (with public memberships such as the "Purple Membership")
- Youth accommodation facilities

== Usage ==
The Rajbari Stadium is used for a variety of sporting and community events. Major uses include:

- Cricket (District leagues and tournaments)
- Football
- Athletics
- Cultural events and gatherings

== Notable events ==
Some notable recent sporting events held at the stadium include:

- 2024 District Cricket League (Super Six round)
- 2025 Prafulla Chandra Ghosh Memorial Tournament
- 2024 Tata IPL Fan Park

== Development ==
The Government of West Bengal has announced plans to construct a new clubhouse in the stadium complex, with construction scheduled to begin before the Puja festival season.

== Location ==
The stadium is located at 8CFR+R5W, Cooch Behar, West Bengal 736101, India. It is within walking distance from the historic Cooch Behar Palace.

== See also ==
- Cooch Behar Palace
- Cooch Behar district
