= Cooch Behar =

Cooch Behar Koch Bihar
- City
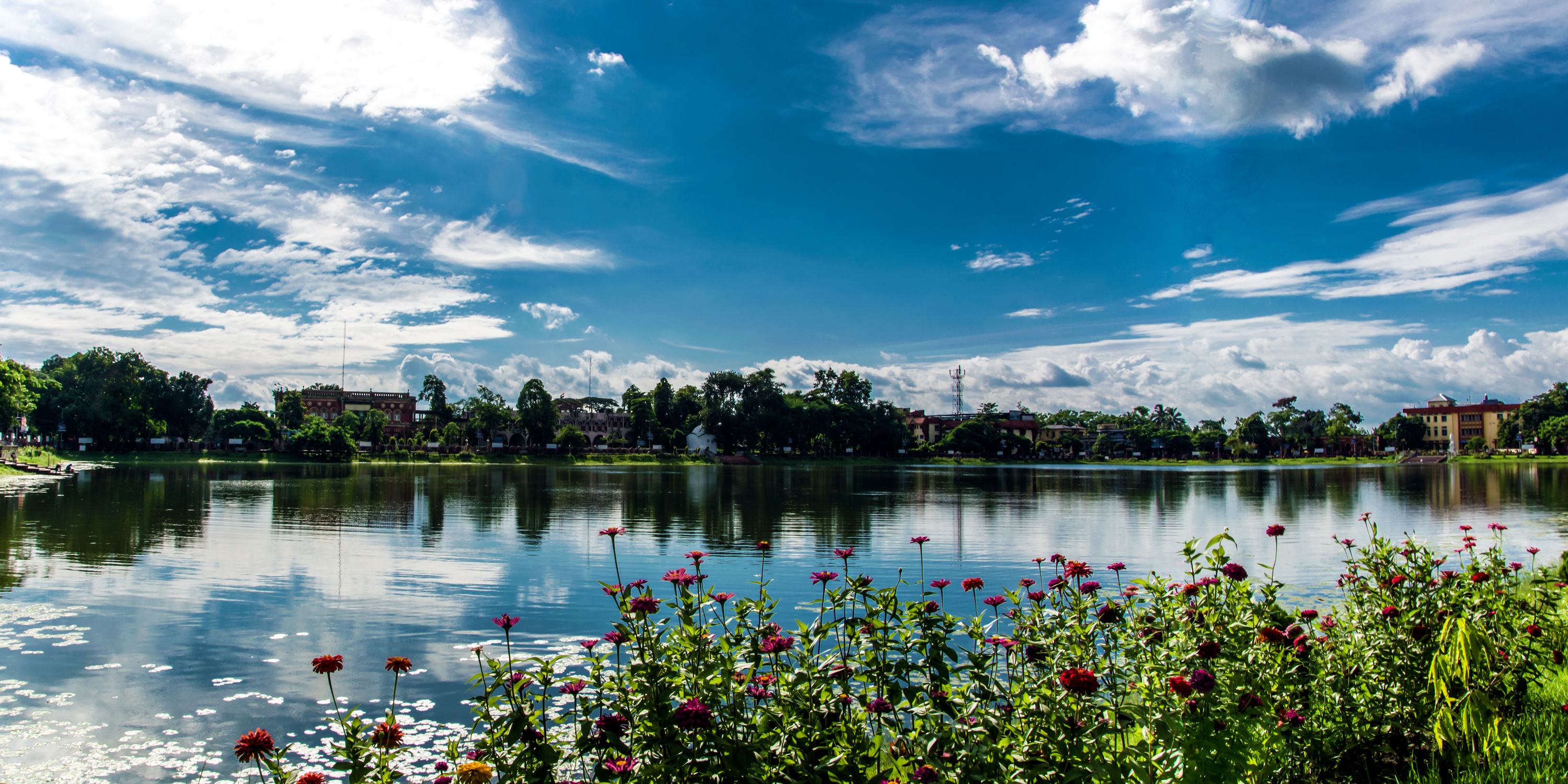
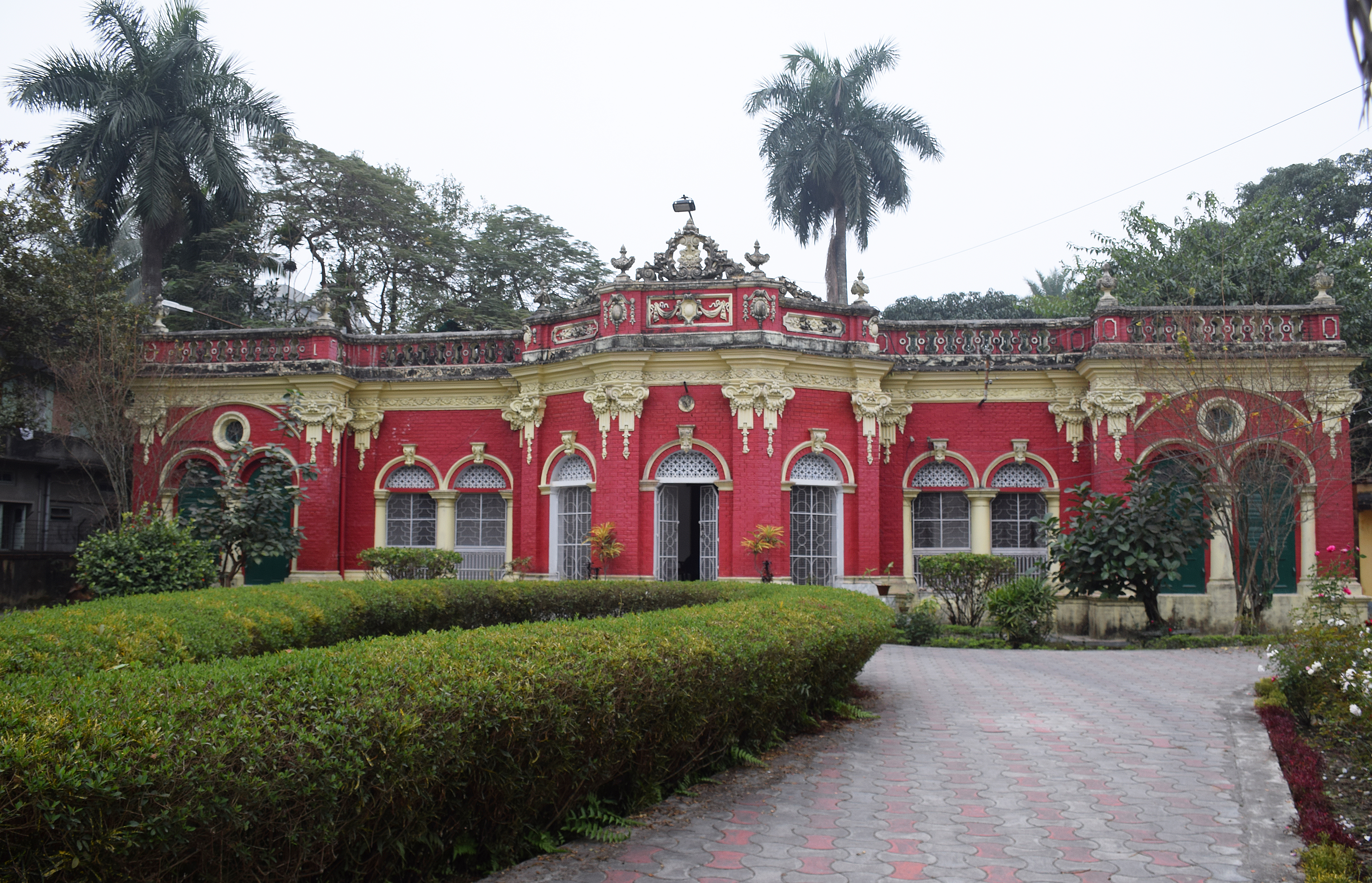
- Sagar Dighi Lake Parijat Villa
- Interactive map of Cooch Behar
- Location in West Bengal, India Cooch Behar (India)
- Coordinates: 26°19′27.084″N 89°27′3.6″E
- Country: India
- State: West Bengal
- District: Cooch Behar
- Established: 12 September 1949

Government
  - Type: Municipality
  - Body: Cooch Behar Municipality
  - Chairman: Rabindra Nath Ghosh (All India Trinamool Congress)

Area
  - Total: 8.29 km^{2} (3.20 sq mi)

Population (2011)
  - Total: 77,935
  - Density: 832/km^{2} (2,150/sq mi)

Languages
  - Official: Bengali
  - Additional official: English, Rajbongshi
  - Regional: Bengali, Rajbongshi
- Time zone: UTC+5:30 (IST)
- PIN: 736101
- Telephone code: 03582
- Vehicle registration: WB-64/63
- Lok Sabha constituency: Cooch Behar (SC)
- Vidhan Sabha constituency: Cooch Behar Uttar (SC), Cooch Behar Dakshin, Natabari
- Website: coochbehar.gov.in coochbeharmunicipality.com

Administrative map of Cooch Behar

Cooch Behar (Bengali pronunciation: [kot͡ʃ biɦar]), also known as Koch Bihar, is a city in the Indian state of West Bengal and it stands on bank of the Torsa river. The city is the headquarters of the Cooch Behar district. During the British Raj, Cooch Behar was the seat of the princely state of Cooch Behar. In the North Bengal region, the only planned city with royal heritage is Cooch Behar. The city is a popular tourist destination and cultural hub in Bengal.

== Etymology ==
The name Cooch Behar is derived from two words— Cooch, a corrupted form of the word Koch, the name of the Koch tribes, and the word Behar is derived from vihara meaning land or settlement. Koch Behar means land of the Koches.

== History ==
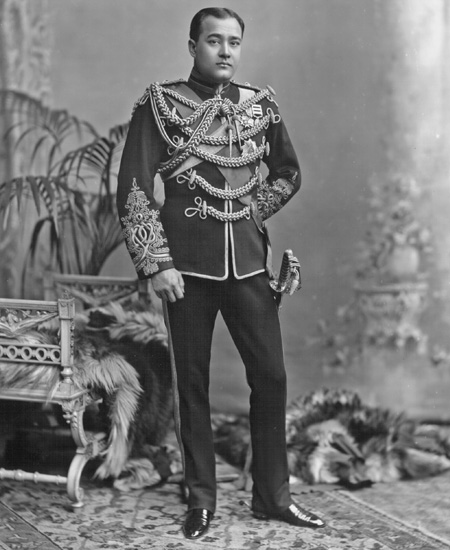
Maharaja Nripendra Narayan of Cooch Bihar

=== Early period ===
Cooch Behar formed part of the Kamarupa Kingdom from the 4th to the 12th. In the 13th century, the area became a part of the Kamata Kingdom. The Khens ruled until about 1498 CE, when they fell to Alauddin Hussain Shah, the independent Sultan of Gour. The new invaders fought with the local Bhuyan chieftains and the Ahom king Suhungmung and lost control of the region. During this time, the Koch tribe became very powerful, proclaimed itself Kamateshwar (Lord of Kamata), and established the Koch dynasty.

The first important Koch ruler was Bisu, later called Biswa Singha, who came to power in 1515 CE. Under his son, Nara Narayan, the Kamata Kingdom reached its zenith. Nara Narayan's younger brother, Shukladhwaj (Chilarai), was a noted military general who undertook expeditions to expand the kingdom. He became governor of its eastern portion.

As the early capital of the Koch Kingdom, Koch Behar's location was not static and became stable only when it shifted to Cooch Behar town. Rup Narayan, on the advice of an unknown saint, transferred the capital from Attharokotha to Guriahati (now called Cooch Behar town) on the banks of the Torsa river between 1693 and 1714. After this, the capital was always in or near its present location.

In 1661 CE, Pran Narayan planned to expand his kingdom. However, Mir Jumla, the subedar of Bengal under the Mughal emperor Aurangazeb, attacked Cooch Behar and conquered the territory, meeting almost no resistance. The town of Cooch Behar was subsequently named Alamgirnagar. Pran Narayan regained his kingdom within a few days.

=== British Raj ===
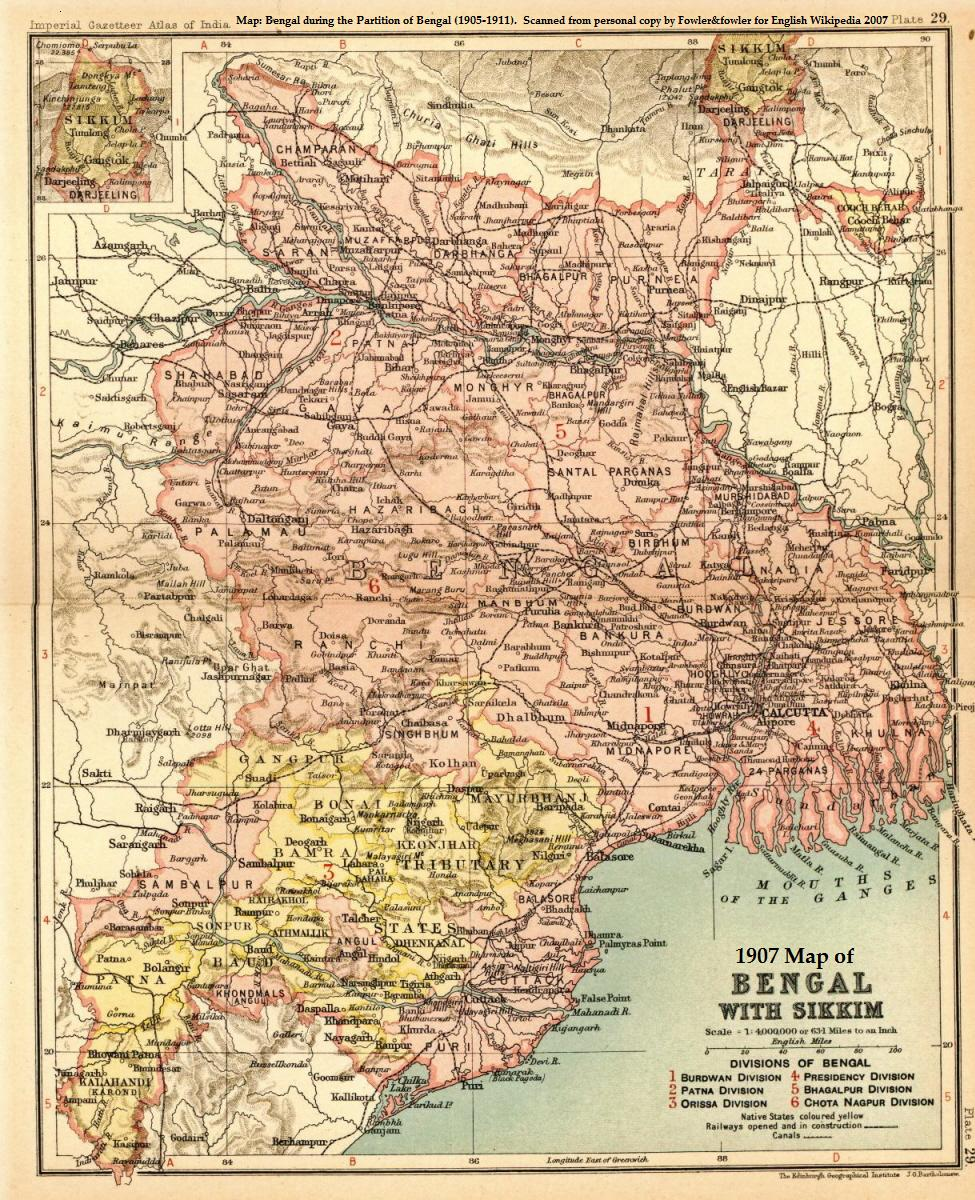
1907 map of Bengal with Sikkim

Between 1772 and 1773, the Bhutanese Desi attacked and seized control of Cooch Behar. In response, Cooch Behar entered into a defence treaty with the English East India Company on 5 April 1773, to drive out the Bhutanese invaders. During this period, Bhutanese coins were minted in Cooch Behar. Once the Bhutanese were expelled, Cooch Behar was reinstated as a princely state under the aegis of the British East India Company.

Cooch Behar Palace is built after classical Italian architecture. The dome of the Palace is in Italian style, resembling the dome of St. Peter's Basilica, Vatican City, Rome. It had been built-in 1887, during the reign of Maharaja Nripendra Narayan. In 1878, the maharaja married the daughter of Brahmo preacher Keshab Chandra Sen. This union led to a renaissance in Cooch Behar state. Maharaja Nripendra Narayan is known as the architect of modern Cooch Behar town.

=== Post-Independence ===
Under an agreement between the king of Cooch Behar and the Indian Government at the end of British rule, Maharaja Jagaddipendra Narayan transferred full authority, jurisdiction, and power of the state to the Dominion Government of India, effective 12 September 1949. Eventually, Cooch Bihar became part of the state of West Bengal on 19 January 1950, with Cooch Behar town as its headquarters.

== Geography ==
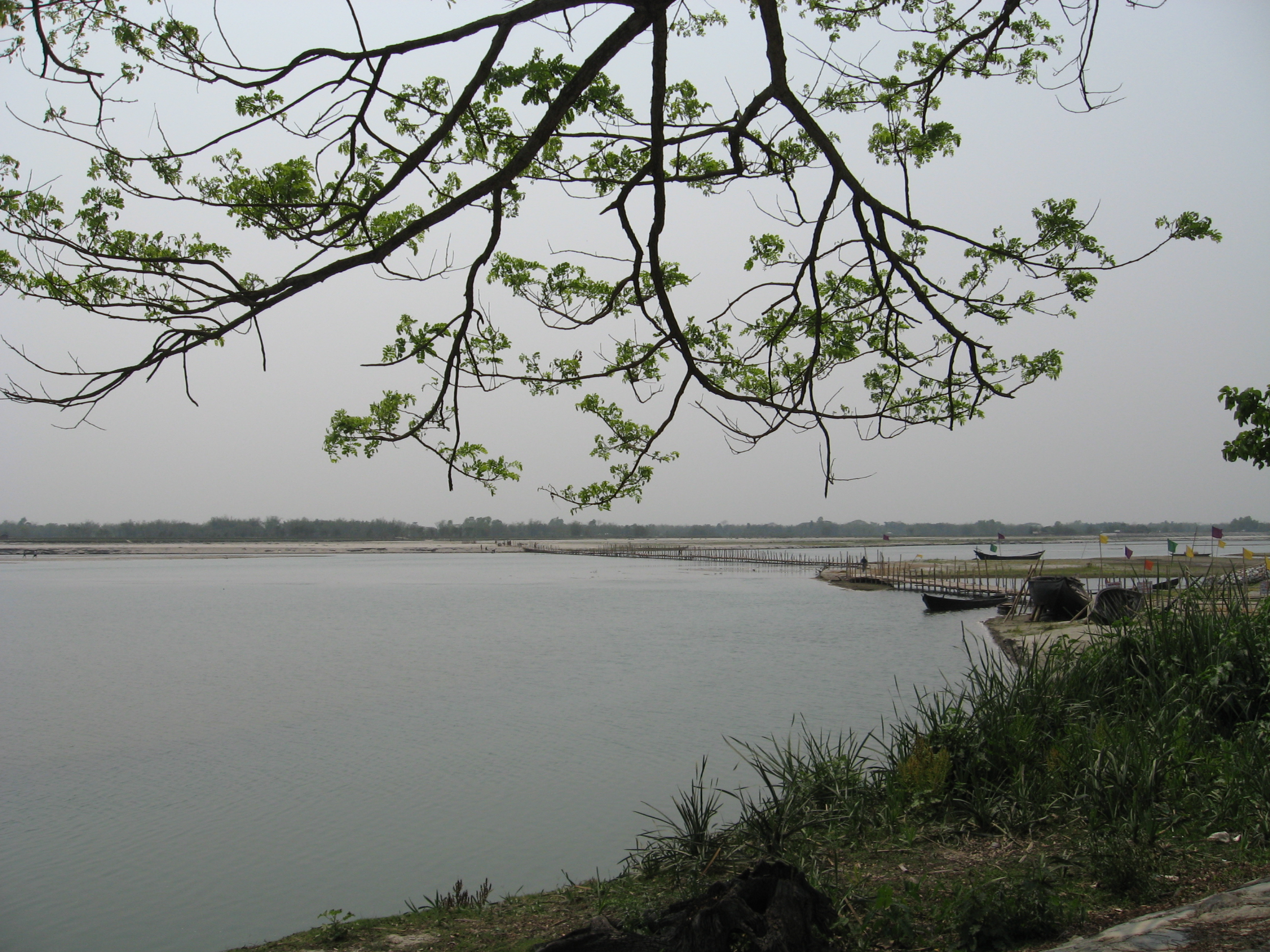
Torsa River near Cooch Behar

The Torsa River flows by the western side of town. Heavy rains often cause strong river currents and flooding. The turbulent water carries huge amounts of sand, silt, and pebbles, which hurt crop production as well as the hydrology of the region. Alluvial deposits from the soil, which is acidic. The soil depth varies from 15 to 50 cm (5.9 to 19.7 in), superimposed on a bed of sand. The foundation materials are igneous and metamorphic rocks at a depth of 1,000 to 1,500 m (3,300 to 4,900 ft). The soil has low levels of nitrogen with moderate levels of potassium and phosphorus. Deficiencies of boron, zinc, calcium, magnesium, and sulphur are high.

Cooch Behar is a flat region with a slight southeastern slope along which the main rivers of the district flow. Most highland areas are in the Sitalkuchi region, and most low-lying lands lie in the Dinhata region. The elevation of the town is 48 meters above mean sea level. The Torsa river flows by the western side of town. The rivers in the district of Cooch Behar generally flow from northwest to southeast. Six rivers that cut through the district are the Teesta, Jaldhaka, Torsha, Kaljani, Raidak, Gadadhar, and Ghargharia.

The town of Cooch Behar and its surrounding regions face deforestation due to increasing demand for fuel and timber, along with air pollution from increasing vehicular traffic. The local flora includes palms, bamboo, creepers, ferns, orchids, aquatic plants, fungi, timber, grass, vegetables, and fruit trees. Migratory birds and many local species are found in the city, especially around the Sagardighi and other water bodies.

In 1976, the Cooch Behar district became home to the Jaldapara Wildlife Sanctuary (now Jaldapara National Park), which has an area of 217 km^{2} (83.8 mi^{2}). It shares the park with the Alipurduar district.

=== Climate ===
Cooch Behar has a moderate climate characterised by heavy rainfall during the monsoons and slight rainfall from October to March. The city does not experience very high temperatures at any time of the year. The daily maximum temperature is 32.7 °C (90.9 °F) in August, the hottest month, and the daily minimum temperature is 9.2 °C (48.6 °F) in January, the coldest month. The highest temperature in Cooch Behar was 41.0 °C, recorded on 11 September 1977; the lowest temperature recorded was 3.3 °C, reported on 28 January 1982. The atmosphere is highly humid. The rainy season lasts from June to September. The average annual rainfall in the city is 3,562 mm (140.2 in).

Climate data for Cooch Behar (1991–2020, extremes 1901–2020)
Month	Jan	Feb	Mar	Apr	May	Jun	Jul	Aug	Sep	Oct	Nov	Dec	Year
Record high °C (°F)	30.0 (86.0)	32.6 (90.7)	37.6 (99.7)	39.4 (102.9)	39.9 (103.8)	40.3 (104.5)	38.9 (102.0)	38.0 (100.4)	41.0 (105.8)	36.1 (97.0)	34.5 (94.1)	33.4 (92.1)	41.0 (105.8)
Mean maximum °C (°F)	27.5 (81.5)	29.6 (85.3)	34.2 (93.6)	35.5 (95.9)	35.2 (95.4)	36.0 (96.8)	35.6 (96.1)	36.1 (97.0)	35.5 (95.9)	34.2 (93.6)	32.0 (89.6)	28.9 (84.0)	37.3 (99.1)
Mean daily maximum °C (°F)	23.5 (74.3)	26.3 (79.3)	29.9 (85.8)	31.1 (88.0)	31.4 (88.5)	31.8 (89.2)	31.8 (89.2)	32.7 (90.9)	31.8 (89.2)	31.2 (88.2)	29.2 (84.6)	25.9 (78.6)	29.7 (85.5)
Mean daily minimum °C (°F)	9.2 (48.6)	12.1 (53.8)	16.3 (61.3)	20.2 (68.4)	22.5 (72.5)	24.5 (76.1)	25.2 (77.4)	25.4 (77.7)	24.5 (76.1)	21.0 (69.8)	15.3 (59.5)	10.9 (51.6)	18.8 (65.8)
Mean minimum °C (°F)	6.3 (43.3)	8.3 (46.9)	11.7 (53.1)	16.4 (61.5)	19.4 (66.9)	21.8 (71.2)	23.1 (73.6)	23.2 (73.8)	21.8 (71.2)	16.7 (62.1)	11.8 (53.2)	7.7 (45.9)	6.0 (42.8)
Record low °C (°F)	3.3 (37.9)	3.6 (38.5)	7.1 (44.8)	8.1 (46.6)	16.1 (61.0)	18.2 (64.8)	20.3 (68.5)	20.0 (68.0)	19.7 (67.5)	13.9 (57.0)	8.2 (46.8)	3.9 (39.0)	3.3 (37.9)
Average rainfall mm (inches)	10.8 (0.43)	14.9 (0.59)	46.8 (1.84)	173.7 (6.84)	363.8 (14.32)	683.4 (26.91)	776.1 (30.56)	597.9 (23.54)	487.3 (19.19)	160.8 (6.33)	8.7 (0.34)	3.0 (0.12)	3,327.4 (131.00)
Average rainy days	0.8	1.3	2.6	8.4	14.4	17.9	19.4	16.5	13.5	5.5	0.6	0.3	101.1
Average relative humidity (%) (at 17:30 IST)	74	64	56	64	73	79	80	81	83	81	78	76	74
Source: India Meteorological Department

== Demographics ==
Historical population
Year	Pop.	±%
1951	26,299,980	—
1961	34,926,279	+32.8%
1971	44,312,011	+26.9%
1981	54,580,647	+23.2%
1991	68,077,965	+24.7%
2001	80,176,197	+17.8%
2011	91,276,115	+13.8%

Religion in Cooch Behar
Religion	Percent
Hinduism	74.05%
Islam	25.54%
Jainism	0.66%
Christianity	0.14%
Others	0.18%

Languages of Cooch Behar (2011)
1. Bengali (83.6%)
2. Hindi (13.9%)
3. Nepali (1.09%)
4. Others (1.44%)

In the 2011 census, the Cooch Behar urban agglomeration had a population of 2,89,434, of which 1,46,626 were male and 1,42,808 were female. The 0–6 years population was 7,910. The effective literacy rate for the urban population was 80.59%.

According to the 2011 census, the Cooch Behar Municipal area has a population of 77,935. The decadal growth rate for the population is 1.38%. The sex ratio is 972 females per 1,000 males. Males constitute 50.6% of the population, and females constitute 49.4%. Cooch Behar has an average literacy rate of 74.78%, higher than the national average of 74.04%. The male literacy rate is 80.71%, while the female literacy rate is 68.49%.

The major religions practised in Cooch Behar are Hinduism (76.44%) followed by Islam (25.54%). Commonly spoken languages are Bengali and Hindi.

== Government and politics ==
=== Civic administration ===
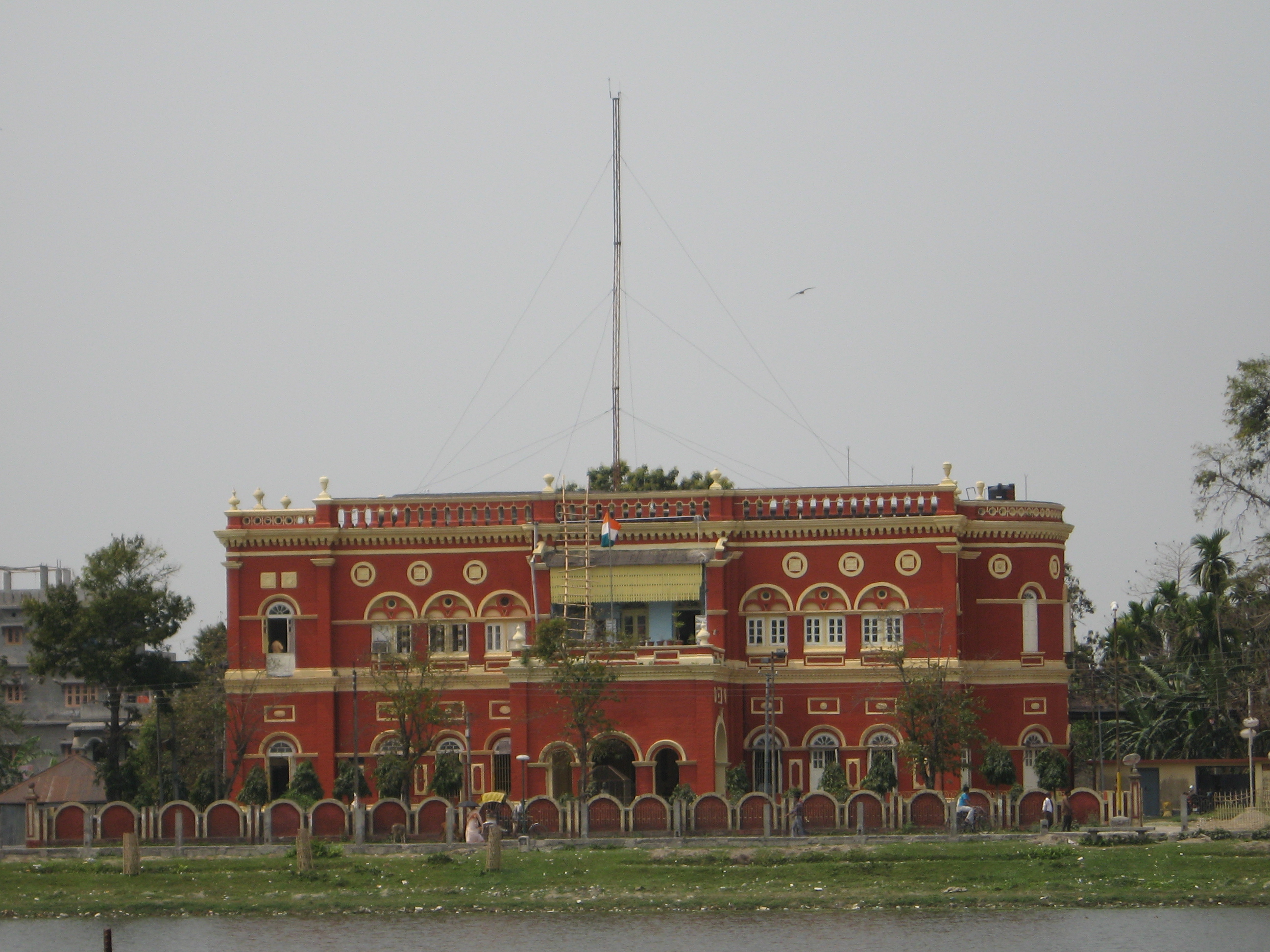
Office of the District Magistrate

Cooch Behar Municipality is responsible for the civic administration of the town.The Cooch Behar Municipal Act of 1944 was the main law for the local government when Cooch Behar was an independent state. When Cooch Behar joined West Bengal in 1950, this old law was kept in place for a short time but slowly changed. The state government eventually created one main set of rules for all cities. The West Bengal Municipal Act, 1993, became the new, single law that replaced the 1944 Act. The area of the Cooch Behar Municipality (the town/headquarters) is approximately 8.29 sq km. The municipality consists of a board of councillors, elected from each of the 20 wards and a few members nominated by the state government. The board of councillors elects a chairman from among its elected members; the chairman is the executive head of the municipality. The All India Trinamool Congress controls the municipality. The state government looks after education, health, and tourism.

The town is in the Cooch Behar constituency and elects one member to the Lok Sabha (the Lower House of the Indian Parliament). The town area is covered by one assembly constituency, Cooch Behar Dakshin, that elects one member to the Vidhan Sabha, which is the West Bengal state legislative assembly. Cooch Behar town comes under the jurisdiction of the district police (which is a part of the state police); the Superintendent of Police oversees security and matters about law and order. Cooch Behar is home to the District Court.

=== Utility services ===
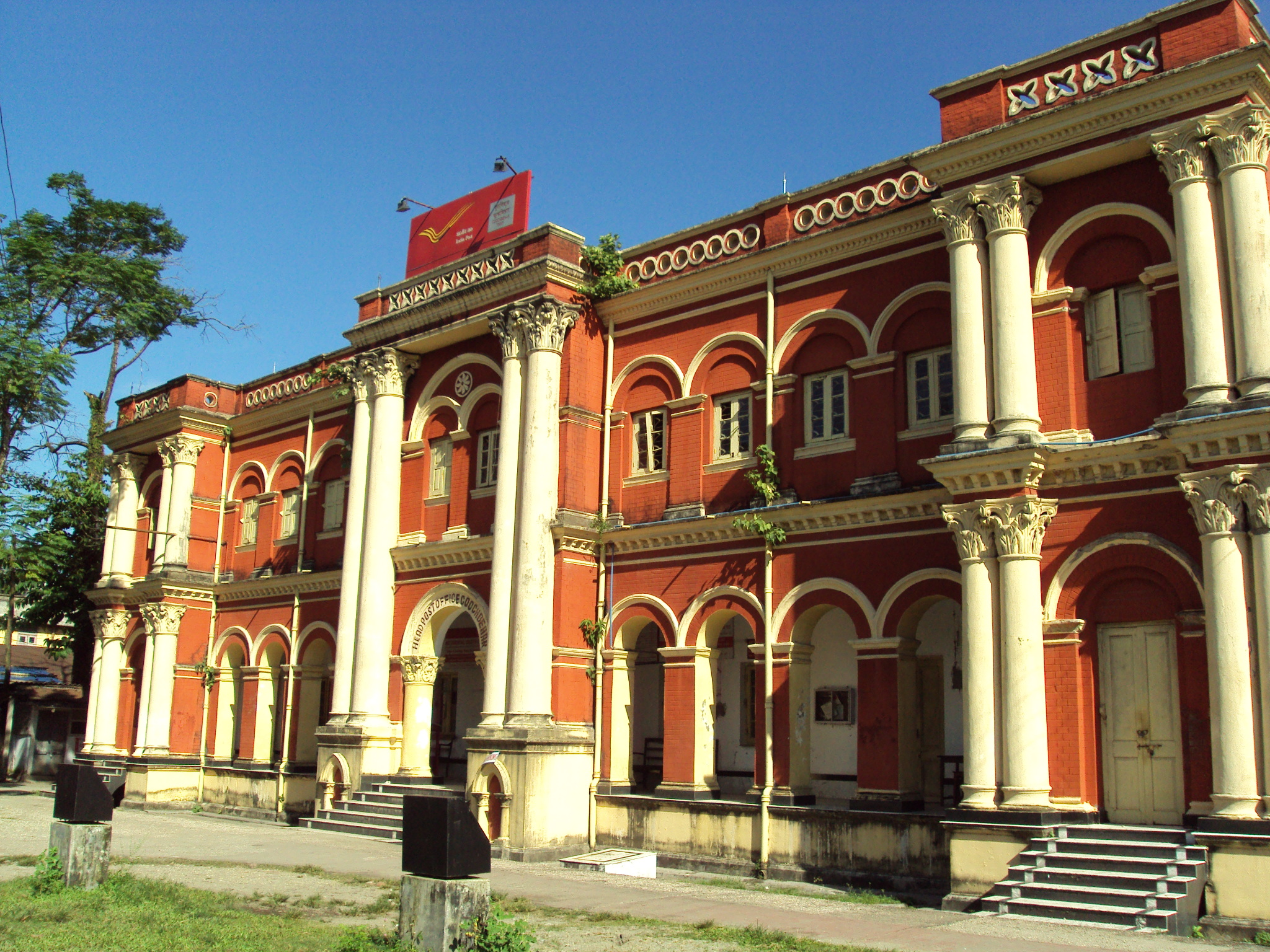
Cooch Behar Head Post Office

Cooch Behar is a well-planned town, and the municipality is responsible for providing essential services such as potable water and sanitation. The city supplies water from groundwater sources, and almost all the houses in the municipal area are connected. Solid waste is collected every day by the municipality van from individual homes. The surface drains, mostly cemented, drain into the Torsa River. Electricity is supplied by the West Bengal State Electricity Board, and the West Bengal Fire Service provides emergency services like fire tenders. Most roads are metalled (macadam), and street lighting is available throughout the town. The Public Works Department is responsible for road maintenance and the streets connecting Cooch Behar with other regional cities. Health services in Cooch Behar include a government-owned District Hospital, a Regional Cancer Centre, and private nursing homes. Utility services provided in Cooch Behar are considered one of the best government utility services in West Bengal. However, the city floods during heavy rain due to problems with the drainage system.

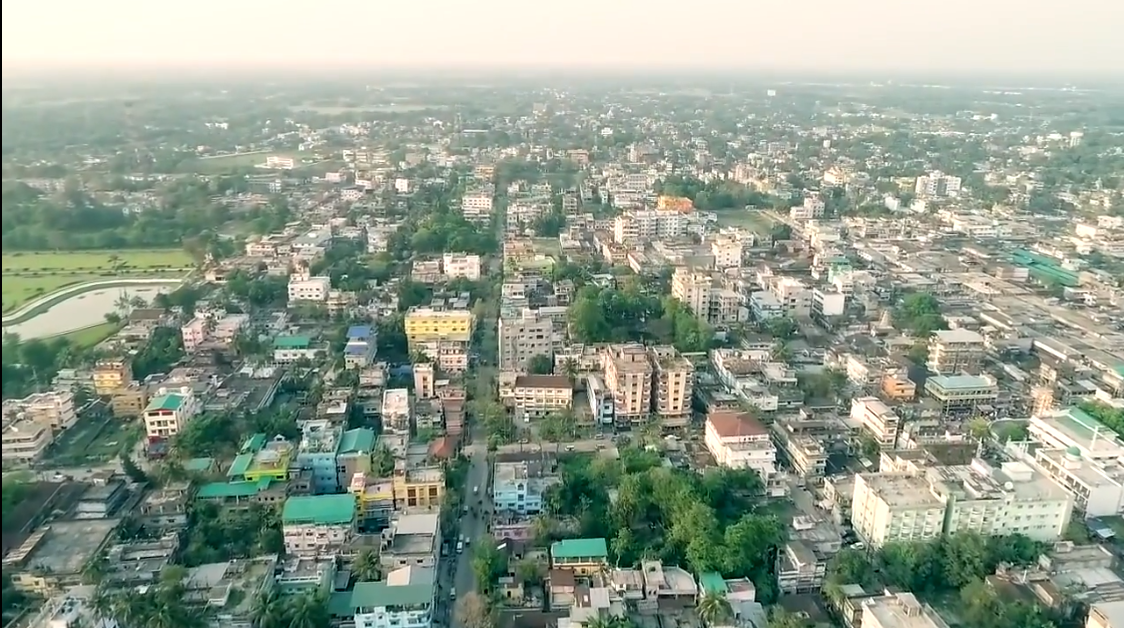
Cooch Behar from above

==== Health facilities ====
The city has one district hospital, formerly MJN Hospital, which has 400 beds. The hospital has now been converted to Maharaja Jitendra Narayan Medical College and Hospital. The city also offers numerous multi-speciality hospitals such as Shubham Hospital, Cooch Behar Mission Hospital and Dr. P K Saha Hospital Pvt. Ltd.

==== Market facilities ====
The municipality has four daily markets, two wholesale markets, and eight commercial complexes. Apart from these, two new malls have also opened recently.

== Economy ==
The central and state governments are among the major employers in Cooch Behar town. Cooch Behar is home to several district-level and divisional-level offices and has a large government-employee workforce. Business is mainly centred on retail goods; the main centres lie on B.S. Road, Rupnarayan Road, Keshab Road, and Bhawaniganj Bazar.

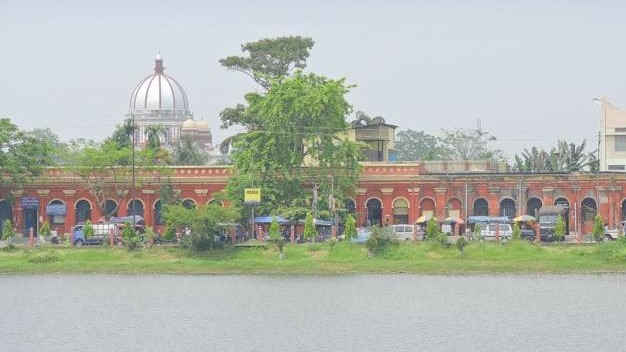

An industrial park has been built at Chakchaka, 4 km (2.5 mi) from town, on the route to Tufanganj. A number of companies have set up industries there.

Farming is a significant source of livelihood for the nearby rural populace, and it supplies the town with fruits and vegetables. Poorer sections of this semi-rural society are involved in transport, primary agriculture, small shops, and manual labour in construction.

Cooch Behar has witnessed radical changes and rapid development in segments like industry, real estate, information technology firms, and education since the advent of the twenty-first century. The changes concern infrastructure and industrial growth for steel (direct reduced iron), metal, cement, and knowledge-based industries. Many engineering, technology, management, and professional study colleges have opened at Cooch Behar. Housing co-operatives, flats, shopping malls, hotels, and stadiums have also emerged.

As the town is near the international border, the Border Security Force (BSF) maintains a significant presence in the vicinity. This gives rise to a large population of semi-permanent residents, who bring revenue to the economy. The state government is trying to promote Cooch Behar as a tourist destination. Though income from tourism is low, Cooch Behar is one of the major tourist attractions in West Bengal.

== Culture ==
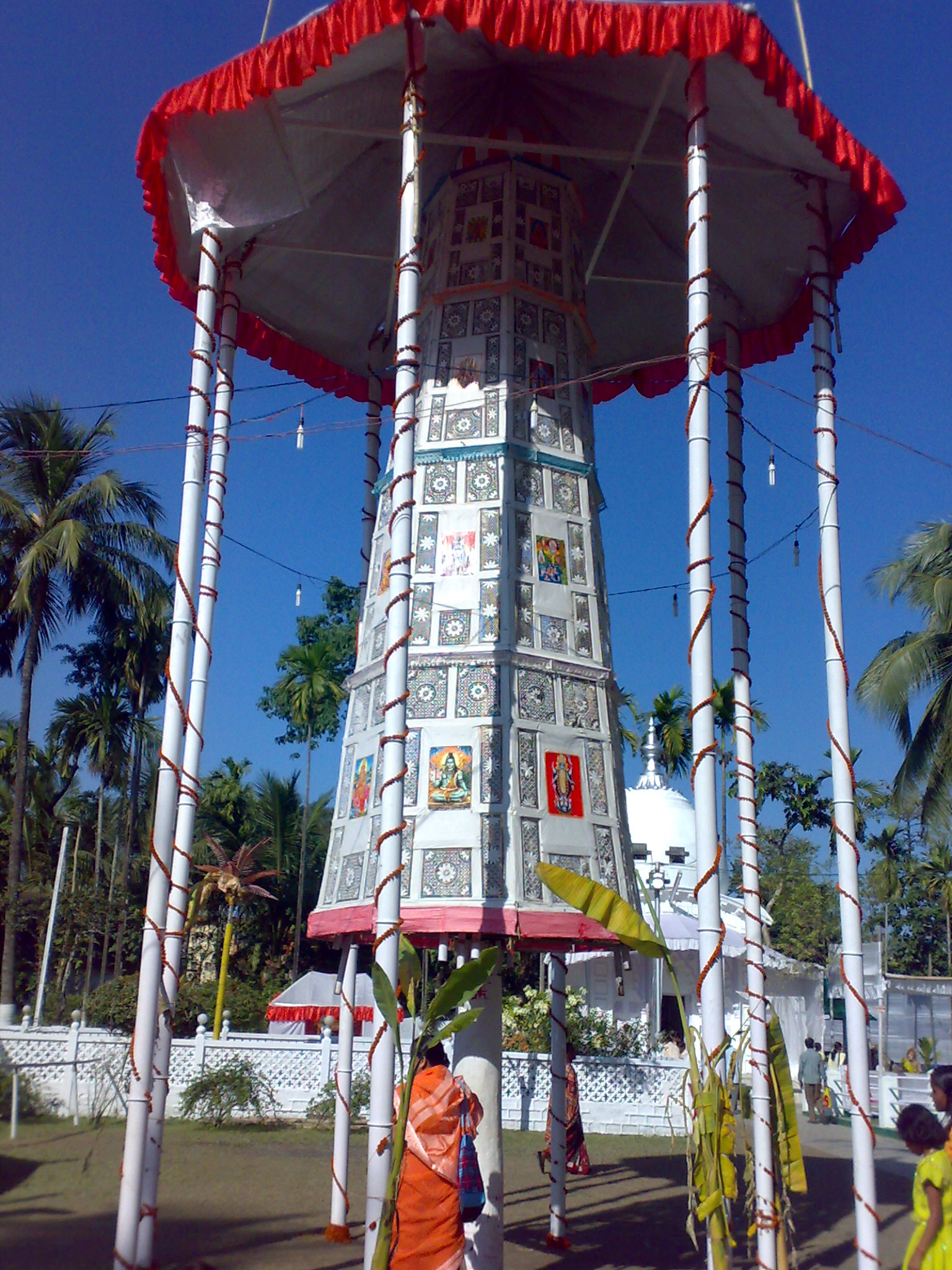
The Ras Chakra during Ras Mela in Madan Mohan Bari

Every year during the Ras Purnima, the city hosts Ras Mela, one of the largest and oldest fairs in West Bengal. The fair is older than 200 years. Cooch Behar Municipality organises the fair in Ras Mela ground near ABN Seal College. During the fair, it becomes a central economic hub of the North Bengal region. Merchants and sellers from all over India and also from Bangladesh join this fair. Earlier, the Maharajas of Cooch Behar used to inaugurate the fair by moving the Ras Chakra, and now the work is executed by the District Magistrate of Cooch Behar District. The Ras Chakra is considered a symbol of communal harmony because an artisanal Muslim family builds it from scratch. A huge crowd gathers in Cooch Behar from neighbouring Assam, Jalpaiguri, Alipurduar, and the whole North Bengal during the fair.

Novelist Amiya Bhushan Majumdar was born, raised, and worked in Cooch Behar. Cooch Behar, with its people, culture, and the river Torsha has been a recurrent theme in his novels.

=== Tourism ===
Cooch Behar is a significant tourist destination in West Bengal. The main attractions are:

==== Cooch Behar Palace ====
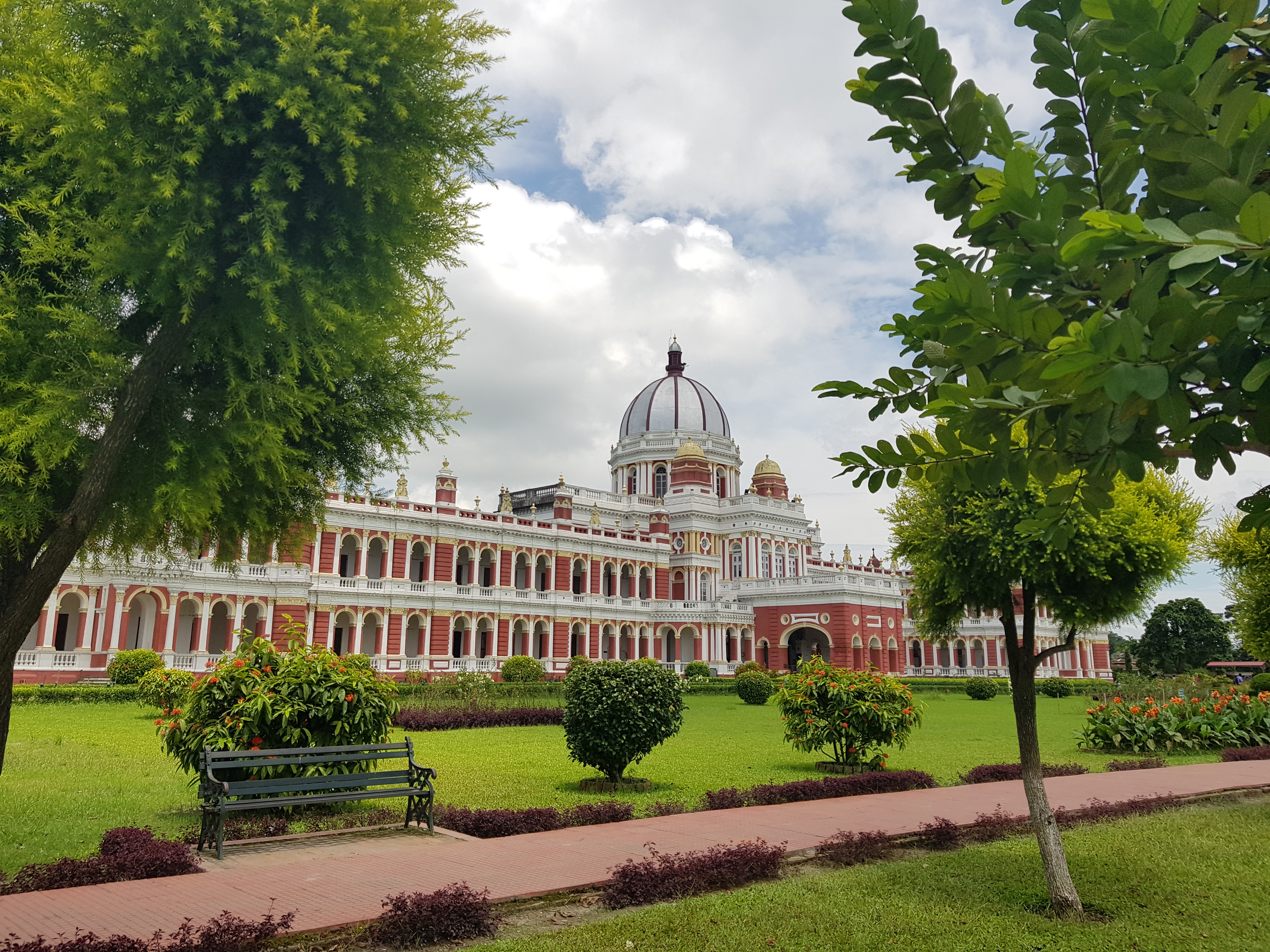
Cooch Behar Palace

It is the main attraction of the city, having been modelled after Buckingham Palace in London and built in 1887 during the reign of Maharaja Nripendra Narayan. It is a brick-built double-story structure in the classical Western style covering 51,309 square feet (4,766.8 square metres). The whole structure stands 395 feet (120 m) long, 296 feet (90 m) wide and rests 4 feet 9 inches (1.45 m) above ground. The Palace is fronted on the ground and first floors by a series of arcaded verandahs with their piers arranged alternately in single and double rows.

The Palace projects slightly at the southern and northern ends, and in the centre is a projected porch providing an entrance to the Durbar Hall. The Hall has an elegantly shaped metal dome topped by a cylindrical louvre-type ventilator. This is 124 feet (38 m) high from the ground and is in the style of Renaissance architecture. The intros of the dome are carved in stepped patterns, and Corinthian columns support the base of the cupola. This adds variegated colours and designs to the entire surface.

There are various halls in the palace and rooms, including the Dressing Room, Bed Room, Drawing Room, Dining Hall, Billiard hall, Library, Toshakhana, Lady's Gallery, and Vestibules. The articles and precious objects that these rooms and halls used to contain are now lost. The original palace was three storied but was destroyed by a 19th-century earthquake measuring 8.7 on the Richter scale. The palace shows the acceptance of the European idealism of the Koch kings and the fact that they had embraced European culture without denouncing their Indian heritage.

==== Sagar Dighi ====
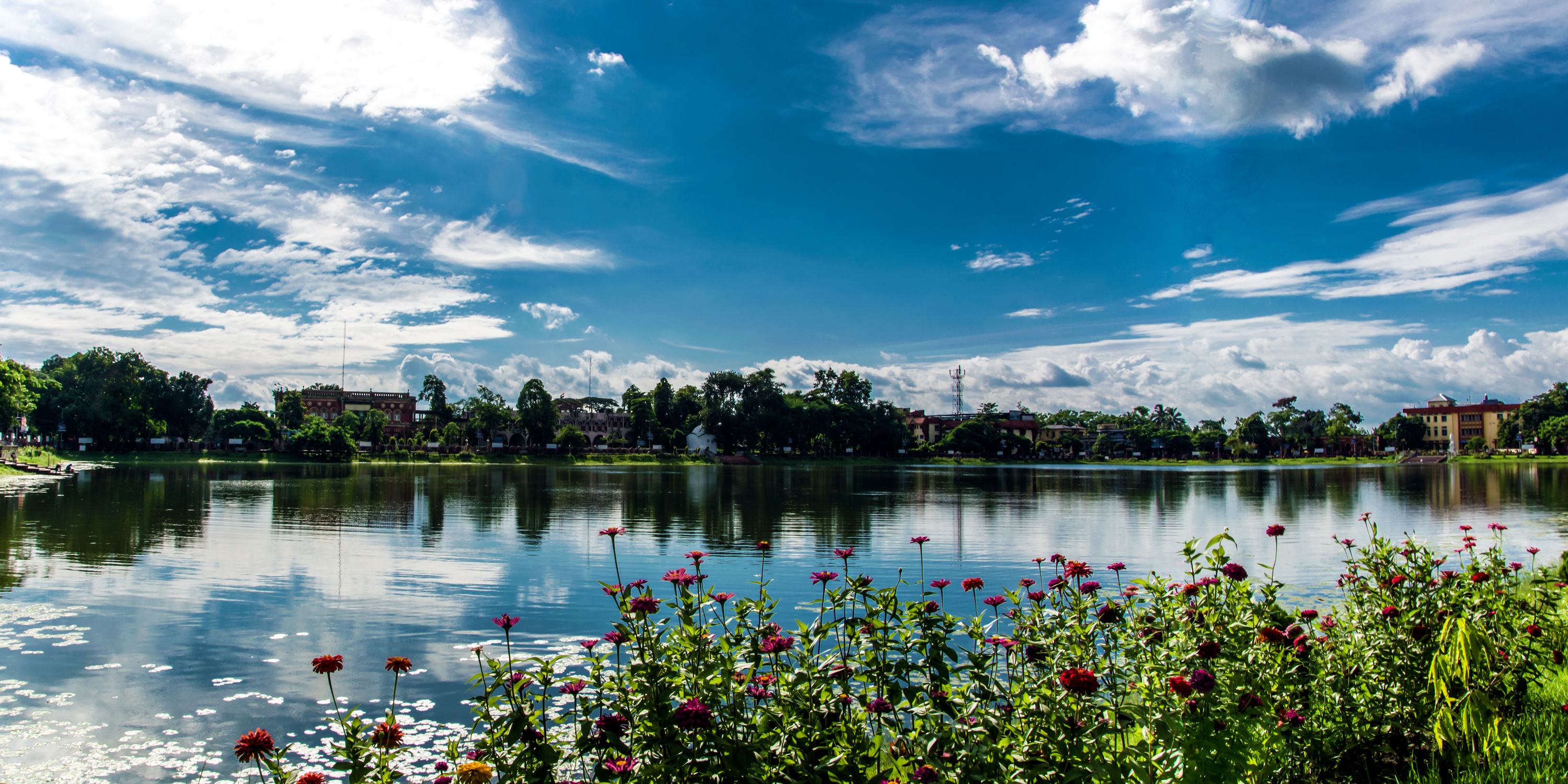
A view of Sagar Dighi

Sagardighi is one of the "Great Ponds" in the heart of Cooch Behar, West Bengal. The name means an ocean-like pond, exaggerated given its great significance. As well as being popular with people, it attracts migratory birds each winter. It is surrounded by many important administrative buildings, like the District Magistrates Office, the Administrative Building of North Bengal State Transport Corporation, BSNL's DTO Office in the West; the Office of the Superintendent of Police, the District Library, the Municipality Building in the South, the Office of BLRO, the State Bank of India's Cooch Behar Main Branch and many others in the East, the RTO office, the Foreigner's registration office, the District Court in the North and others. Most of these buildings are remnants of royal heritage.

== Transport ==
=== Road ===
Cooch Behar is very well connected by road to neighbouring areas, other cities of West Bengal and the rest of the country. Cooch Behar is a major roadway junction after Siliguri towards Northeast India and Bangladesh. NH-17 crosses through the heart of the city, connecting Assam and North Bengal. Apart from this, state highways including SH-16 and SH-12A, pass through Cooch Behar, connecting different places in West Bengal.

=== Bus service ===
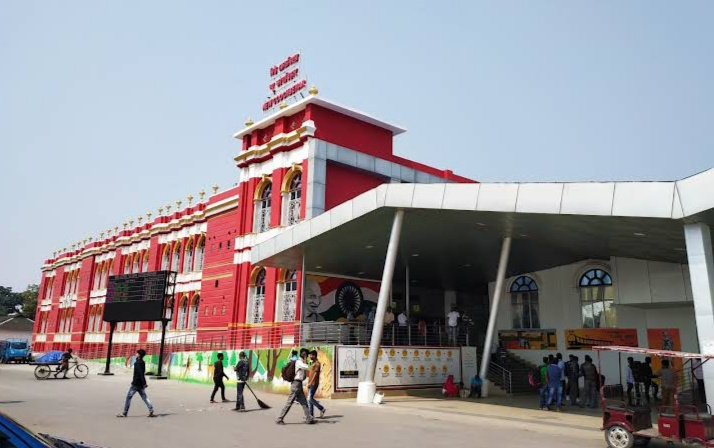
New Cooch Behar railway station in 2019.

North Bengal State Transport Corporation (NBSTC), a state government-run transport corporation headquartered in Cooch Behar, runs regular bus service to most places in West Bengal. Private buses are also available, which operate from bus stops or designated pick-up spots to various tows in Assam, Bihar, and West Bengal. City services from NBSTC are also available for riders to commute from different parts of a city.

- Mini-Bus Stand & NBSTC Bus Terminus: Located near Cooch Behar Palace, it serves as a bus depot for both government and private buses. Government buses are operated by NBSTC.
- NBSTC New Bus Stand: Located within the city, it is the hub for NBSTC buses and a boarding point for long-haul buses.

=== Rail ===
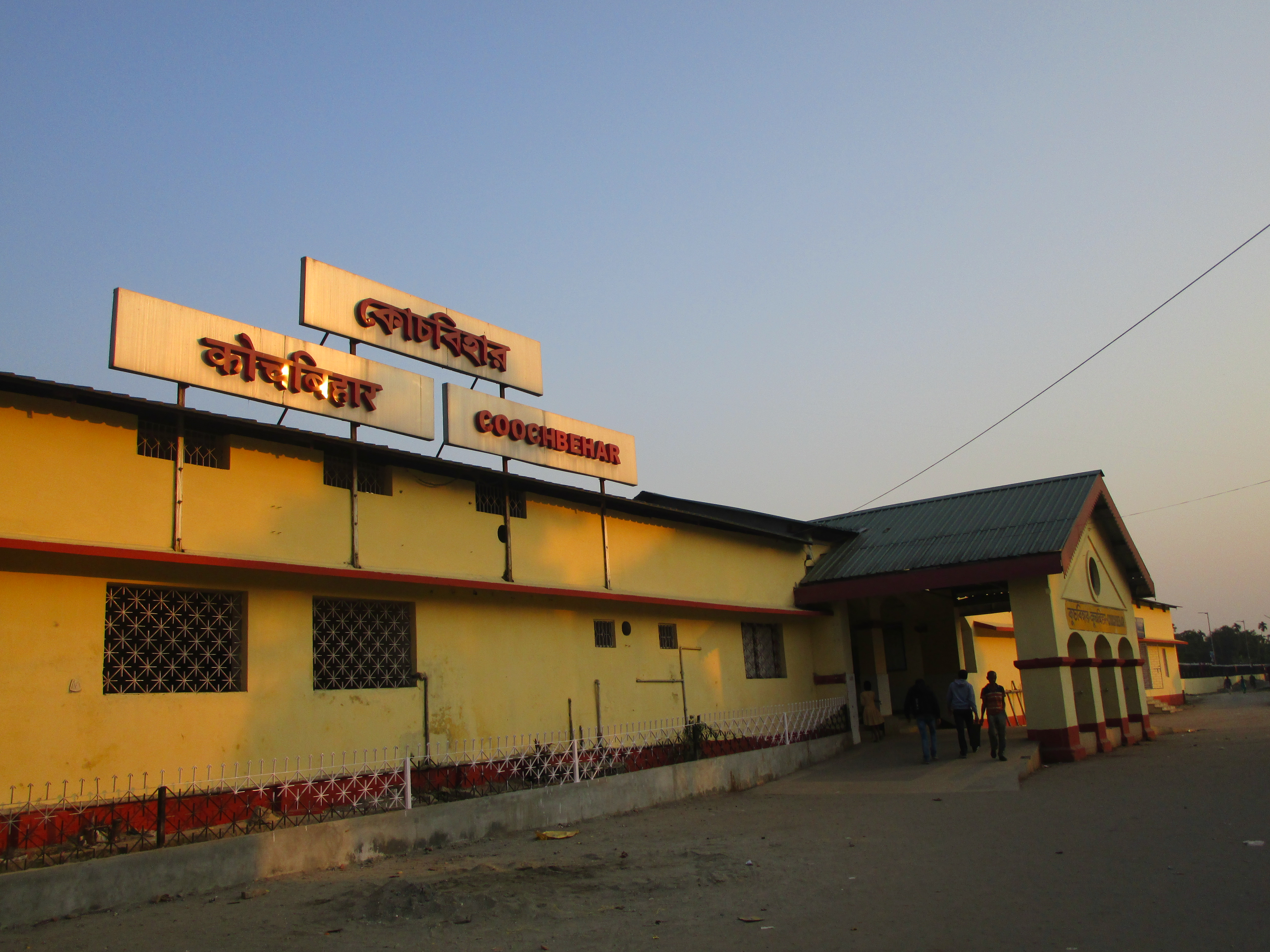
Cooch Behar railway station in 2015.

Being a popular tourism hub, Cooch Behar is well connected through railway with almost all parts of the country. Two stations serve the city.

- New Cooch Behar railway station (NCB): Located around 5 km from the city, it is well connected to almost all major Indian cities including Kolkata, Delhi, Mumbai, Bangalore, Chennai, Guwahati. All Rajdhani, superfast and express trains going towards northeast India have a stoppage here. New Cooch Behar station came up when the broad gauge New Jalpaiguri–New Bongaigaon section of Barauni–Guwahati line was laid in 1966. As of 2018, it is the largest railway junction of Northeast Frontier Railway with six routes towards New Changrabandha, New Jalpaiguri, New Bongaigaon, Alipurduar Junction, Dhubri, and Bamanhat. New Cooch Behar railway station boasts a beautiful look similar to Cooch Behar Palace. This station is equipped with Wi-Fi facilities, restrooms, food cafes, dormitories, waiting lounge elevators and escalators.
- Cooch Behar railway station (COB): Situated inside the town, this station lies on the Alipurduar–Bamanhat branch line. Trains connecting Bamanhat with Alipurduar and Siliguri halt here. It was built in 1901 when Cooch Behar State Railway constructed the Geetaldaha-Jainti line. The station offers Wi-Fi, seating and other basic facilities. A Railway Heritage Museum, a smaller version of the National Rail Museum, is constructed in the station area and looks like Cooch Behar Madan Mohan Temple.

=== Air ===
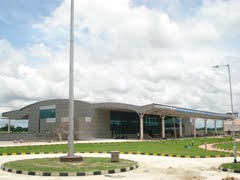
Terminal of Cooch Behar Airport.

Cooch Behar Airport is a domestic airport located near the city. It handles daily flights from Netaji Subash Chandra Bose International Airport in Kolkata.

The nearest international airport is Bagdogra Airport near Siliguri, about 142 km (88 mi) from Cooch Behar. IndiGo, Vistara and SpiceJet are the major carriers that connect the area to Delhi, Kolkata, Guwahati, Mumbai, Chennai, Bangkok, Paro, Bangkok and Chandigarh.

== Education ==
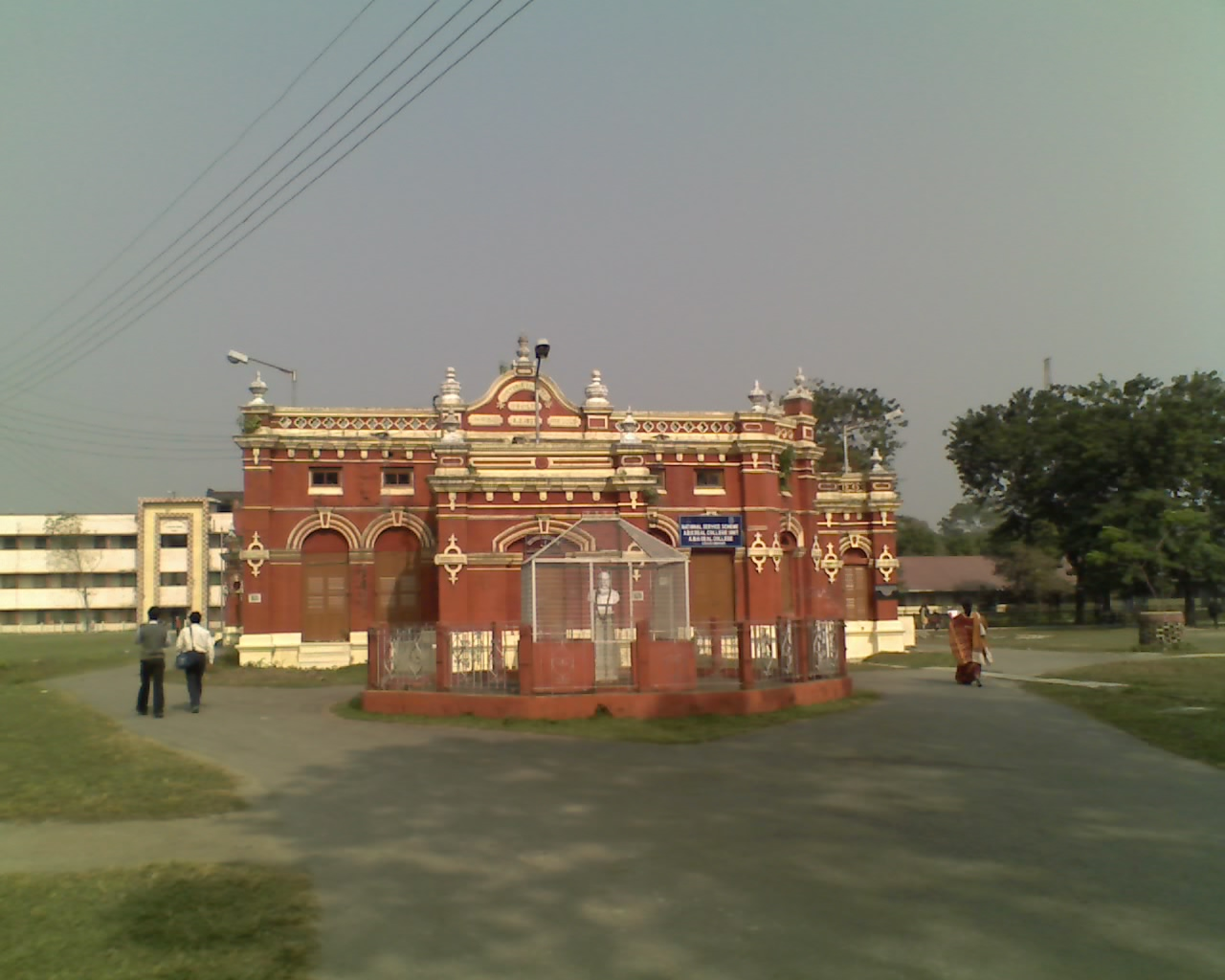
A.B.N. Seal College

Cooch Behar's schools usually use English and Bengali as their medium of instruction, although the use of the Hindi language is also stressed. The schools are affiliated with the Indian Certificate of Secondary Education (ICSE) or the Central Board of Secondary Education (CBSE), or the West Bengal Board of Secondary Education. Some of the reputed schools include Jenkins School, Sunity Academy, and Cooch Behar Rambhola High School.

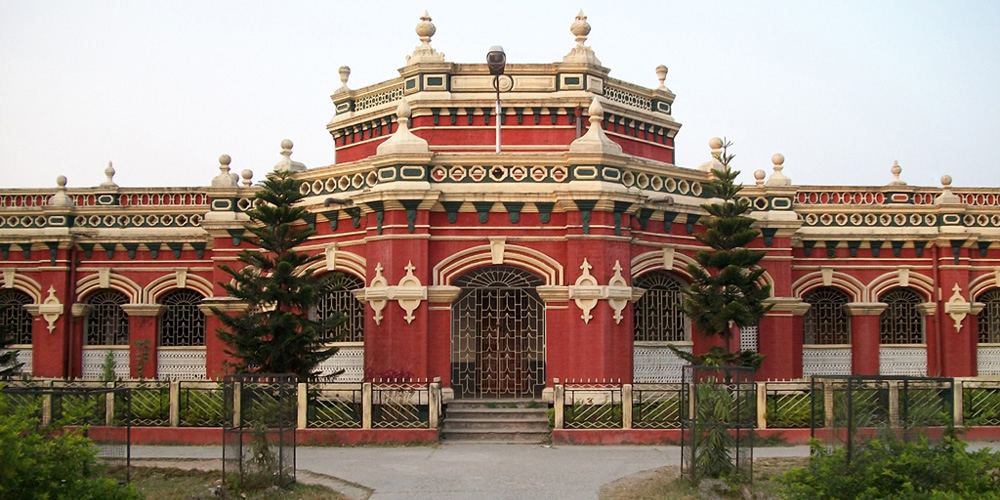
Jenkins School, Cooch Behar

Cooch Behar Panchanan Barma University is the only single university in Cooch Behar. It is a U.G.C. recognised public university in Cooch Behar, West Bengal, India. The university was named after the 19th-century Rajbongshi leader and social reformist, Panchanan Barma. A total of 15 colleges from the Cooch Behar district are affiliated with the university.

There are five colleges and a polytechnic in town, including A.B.N. Seal College, Cooch Behar College, University B.T. & Evening College, all of which are affiliated with the Cooch Behar Panchanan Barma University, which was established in 2013.

Acharya Brojendra Nath Seal College was established in 1888 as Victoria College by King Nripendra Narayan of Cooch Behar State, affiliated with the University of Calcutta and University of North Bengal. In 1950, when the state of Cooch Behar was merged into the Union of India, governance was passed to the Government of West Bengal and affiliation to Cooch Behar Panchanan Barma University. In 1970, it was renamed Acharya Brojendra Nath Seal College.

1981 the Maya Chitram Art Institute was founded in Cooch Behar. There is an agricultural university, Uttar Banga Krishi Vishwavidyalaya, 16 km from the town at Pundibari. A medical college named Maharaja Jitendra Narayan Medical College and Hospital began instruction in 2019 with 100 students.

Cooch Behar Government Engineering College started its first academic session in 2016.

== Notable people ==
B

- Anjana Bhowmick, (1944-2024), Indian actress
- Rathindra Bose, 11th Speaker of the West Bengal Legislative Assembly

D

- Dinesh Chandra Dakua, (1929 or 1930 – 2025), West Bengal cabinet minister
- Samar Deb, (1963), Indian writer

G

- Rabindra Nath Ghosh, West Bengal cabinet minister
- Dipak Giri (born 1984), Indian writer and academic
- Fulati Gidali (1911-2019), Indian folk singer
- Kamal Guha (1928–2007), Agriculture Minister of West Bengal
- Udayan Guha (born 1955), West Bengal cabinet minister

H

- Fazle Haque (born 1933), state minister

M

- Amiya Bhushan Majumdar, Indian novelist and short-story writer

P

- Thakur Panchanan (1918-2001), Indian social reformer
- Sree Parabat (1927-2010), Indian writer and journalist
- Nisith Pramanik (born 1986), West Bengal cabinet minister

R

- Mouni Roy (born 1985), Indian actress

== Gallery ==
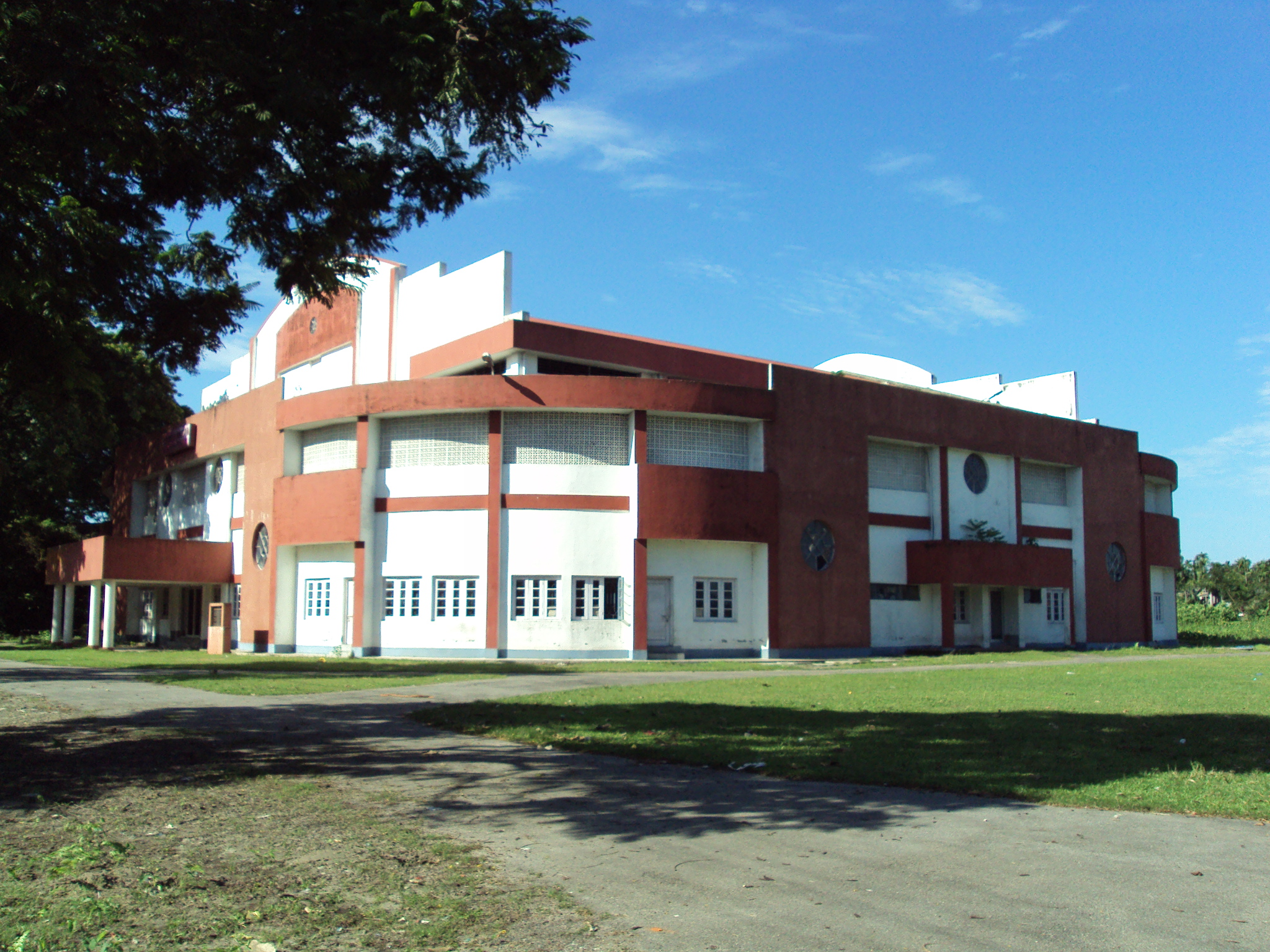
Indoor Stadium, cooch Behar

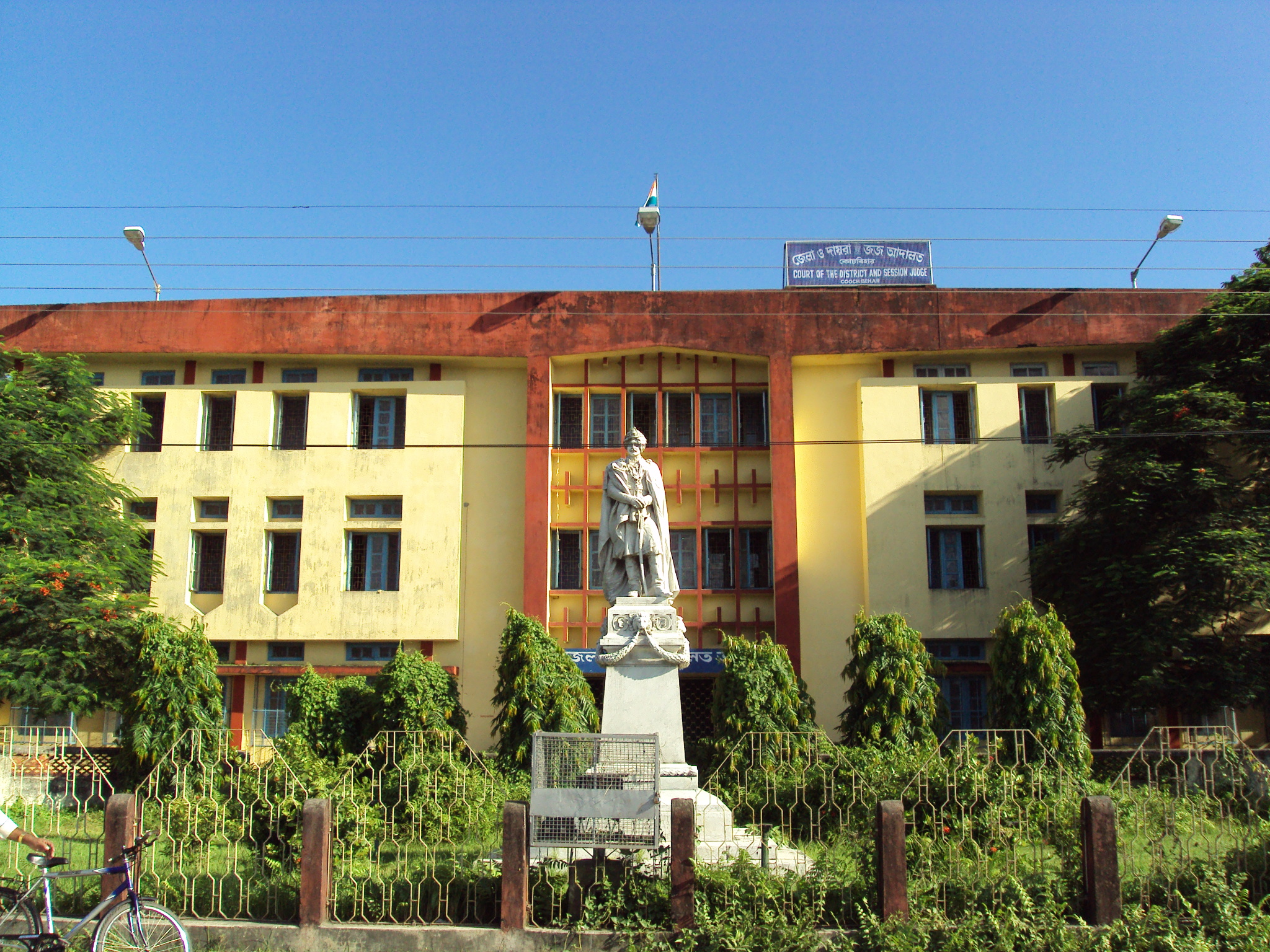
District Court

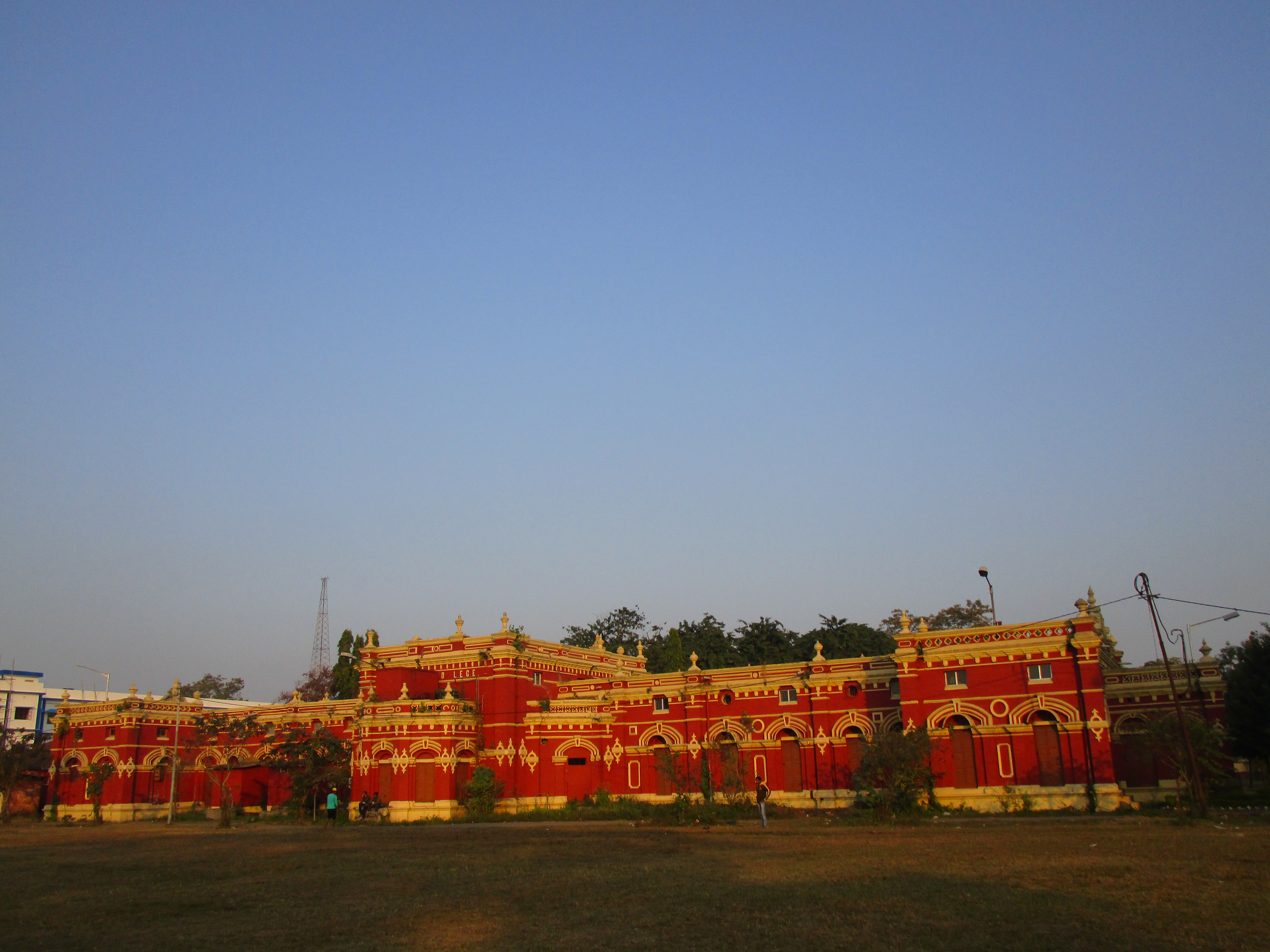
ABN Seal College

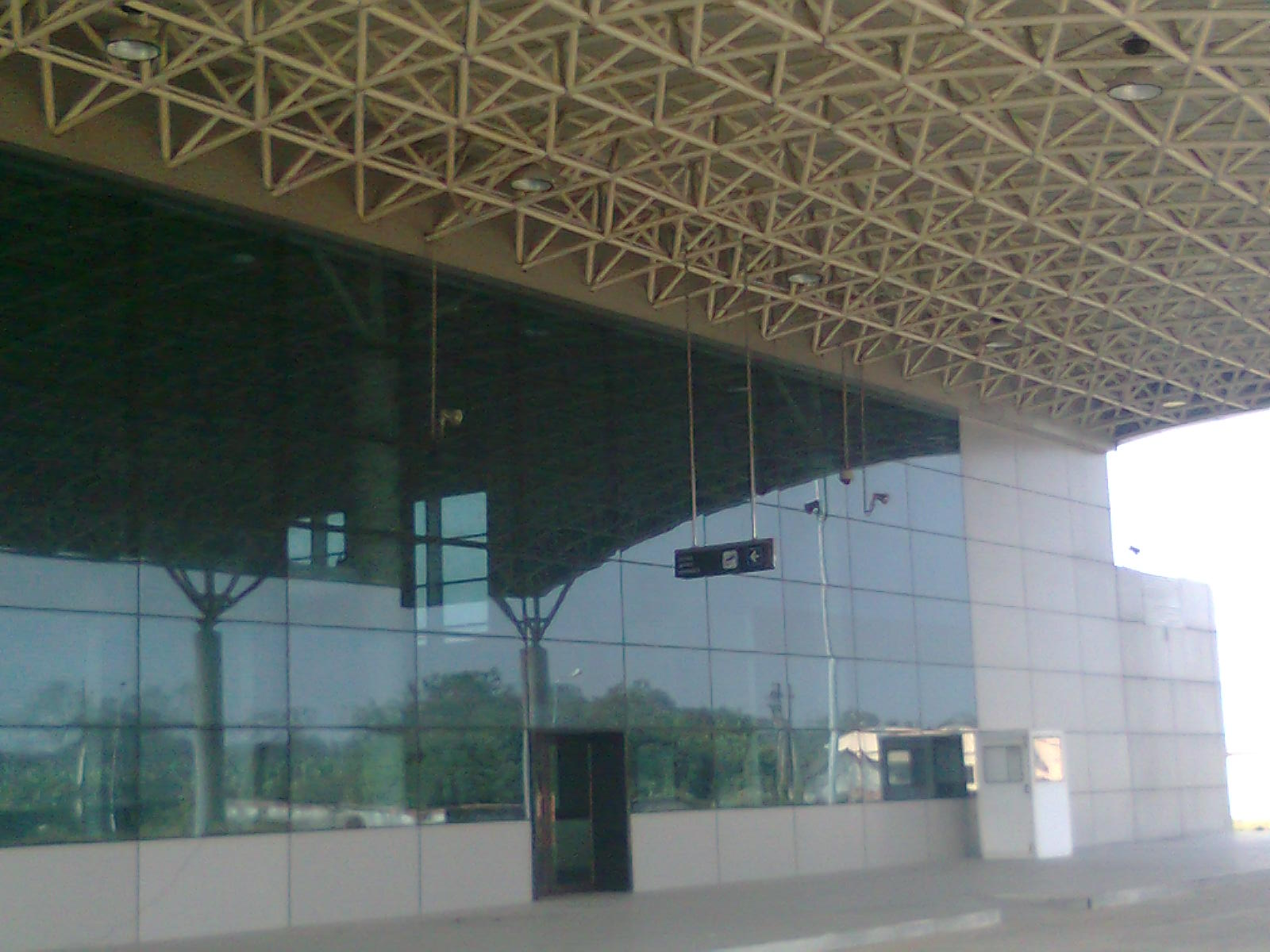
Cooch Behar Airport

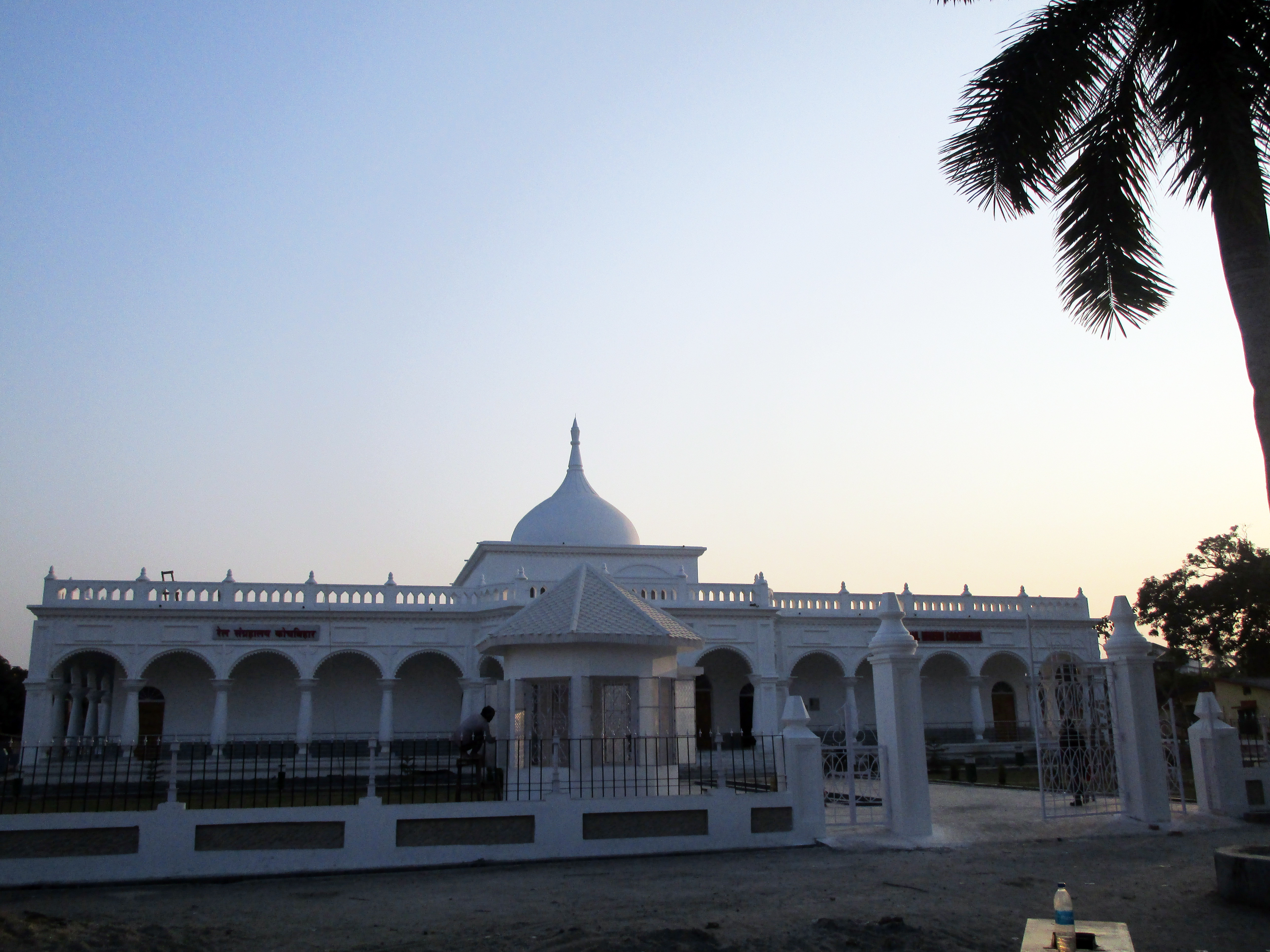
Railway Museum near Cooch Behar Station

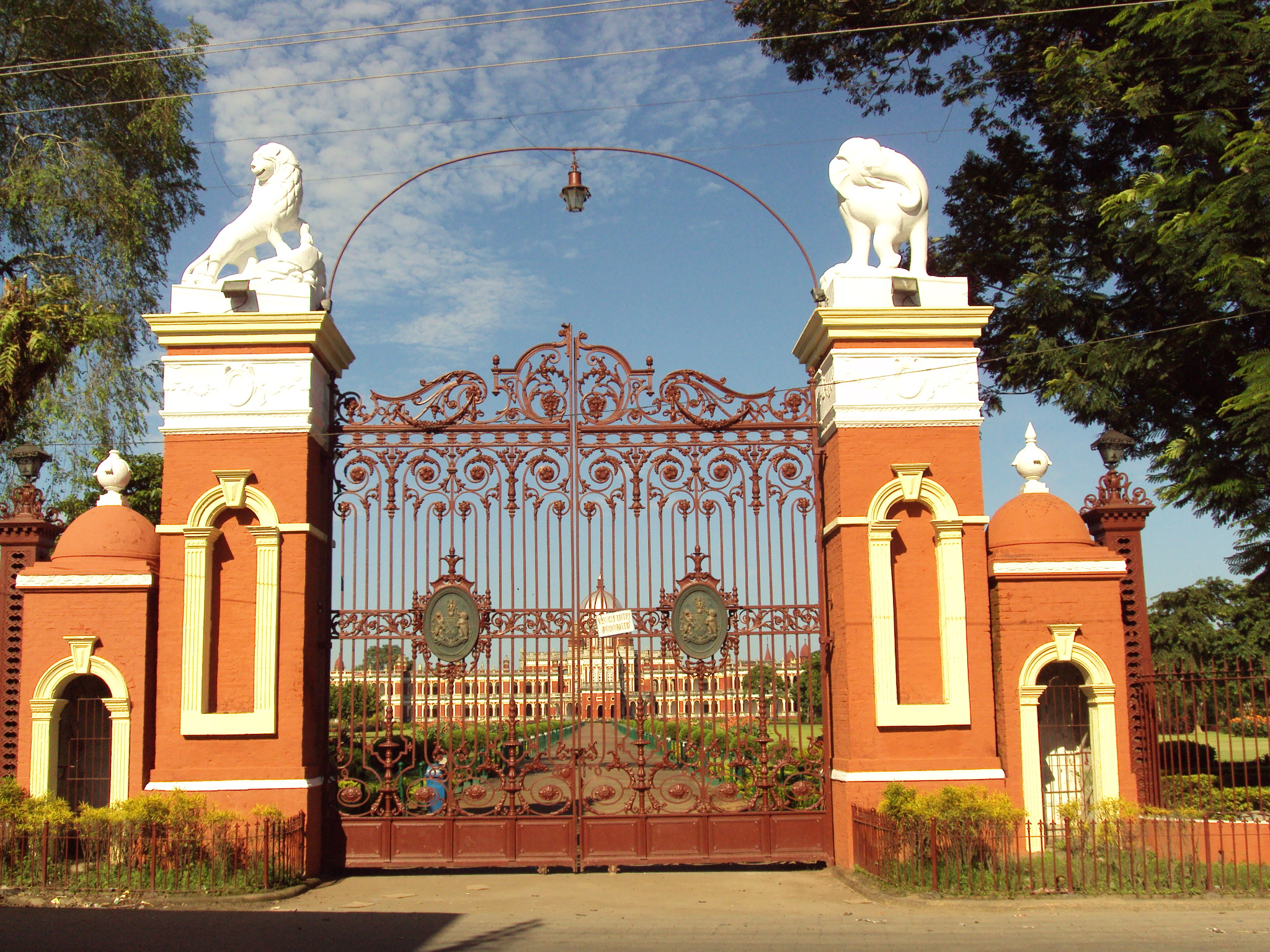
Palace Gate

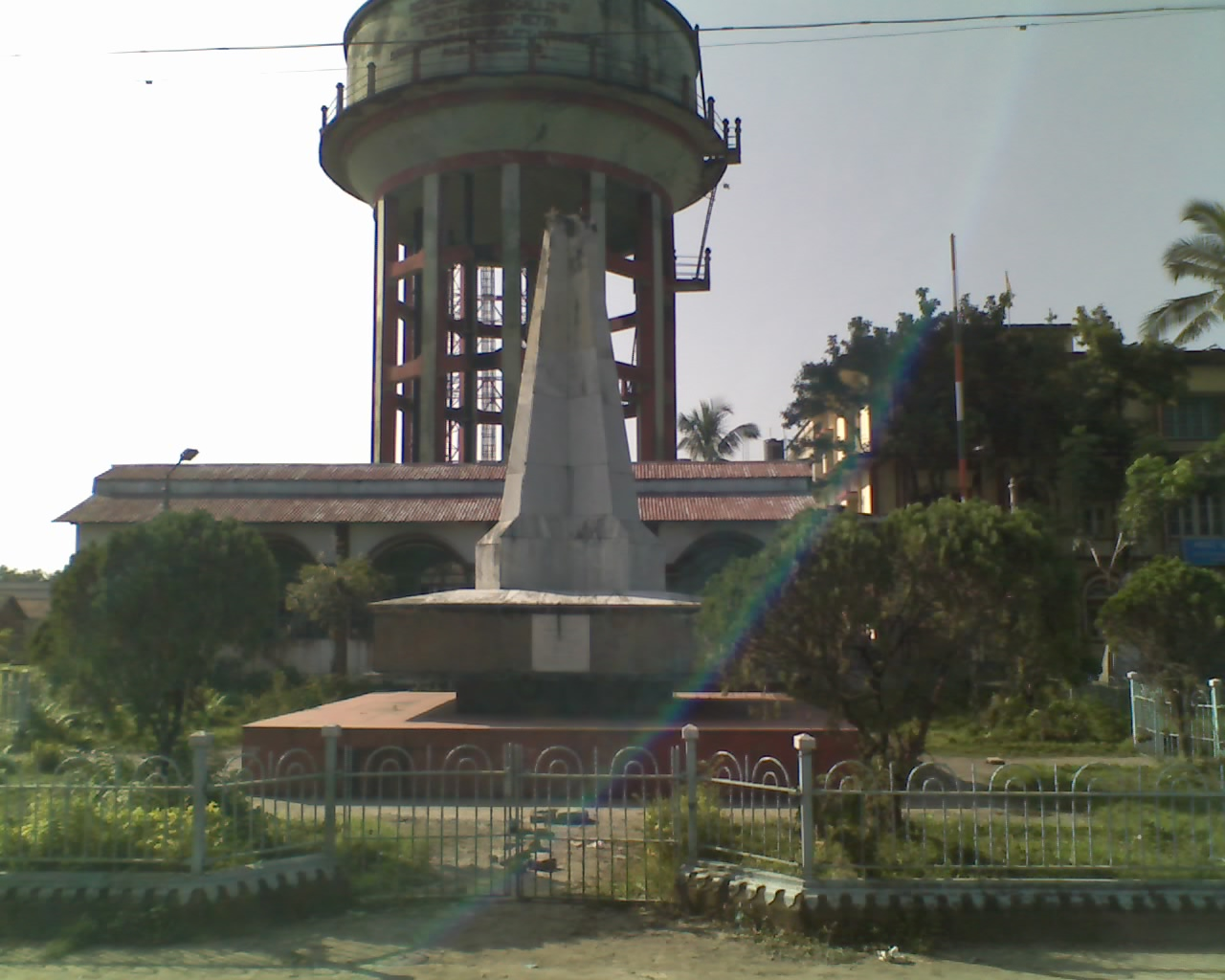
Sahid Bag, Cooch Behar

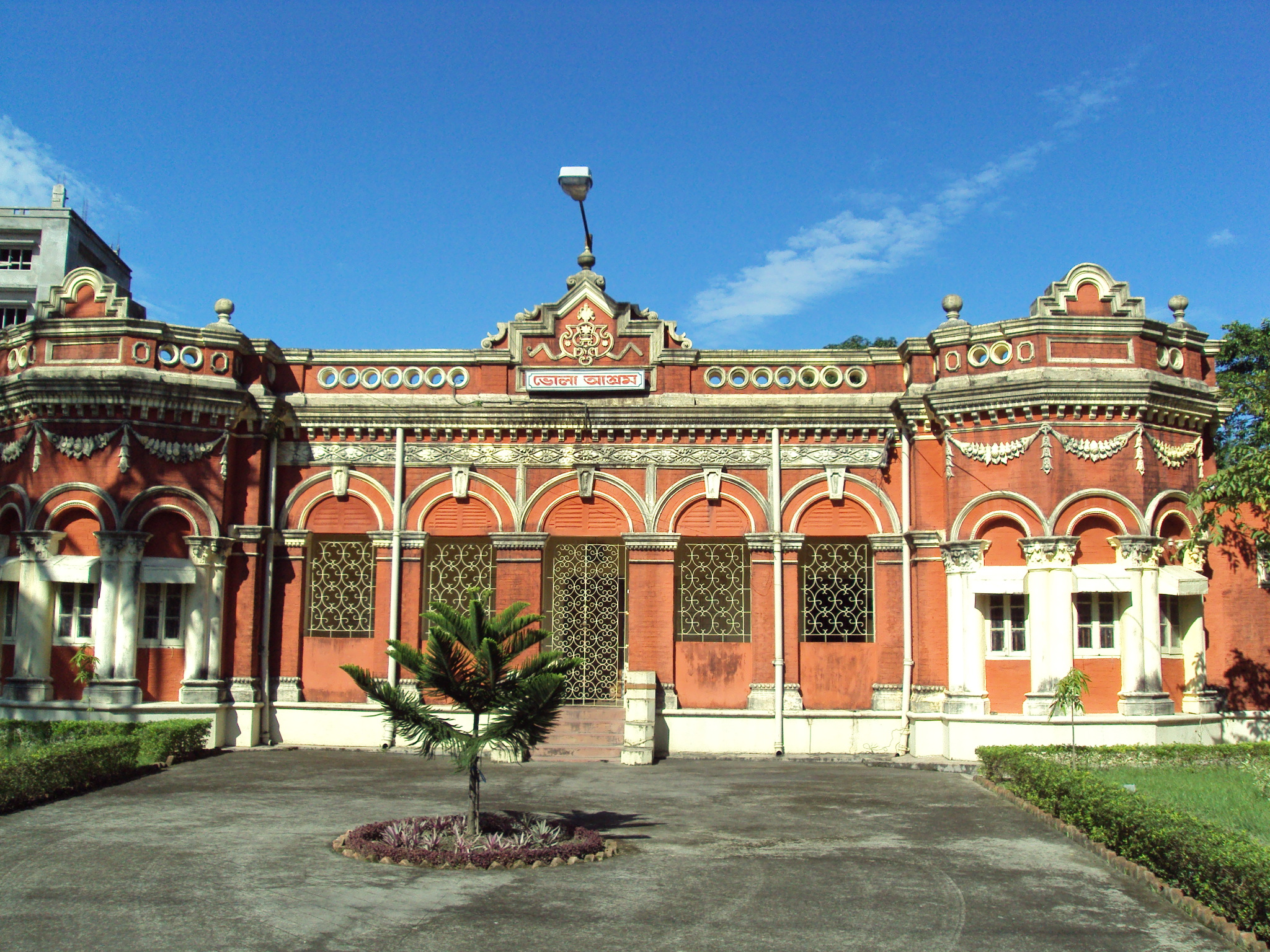
Bhola Ashram, Cooch Behar. (Residence of Executive Engineer WBPWD)

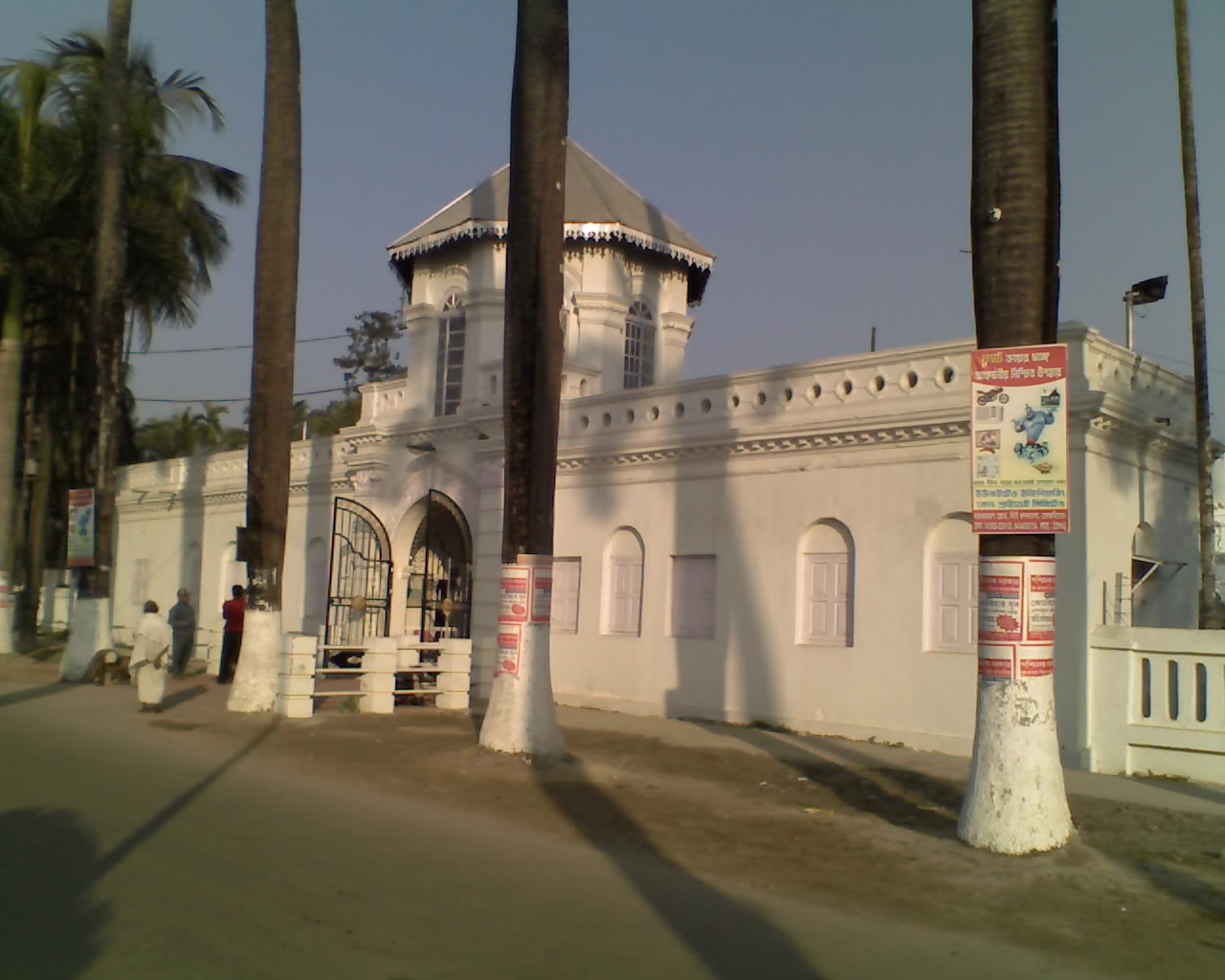
Madan Mohan Bari Entrance

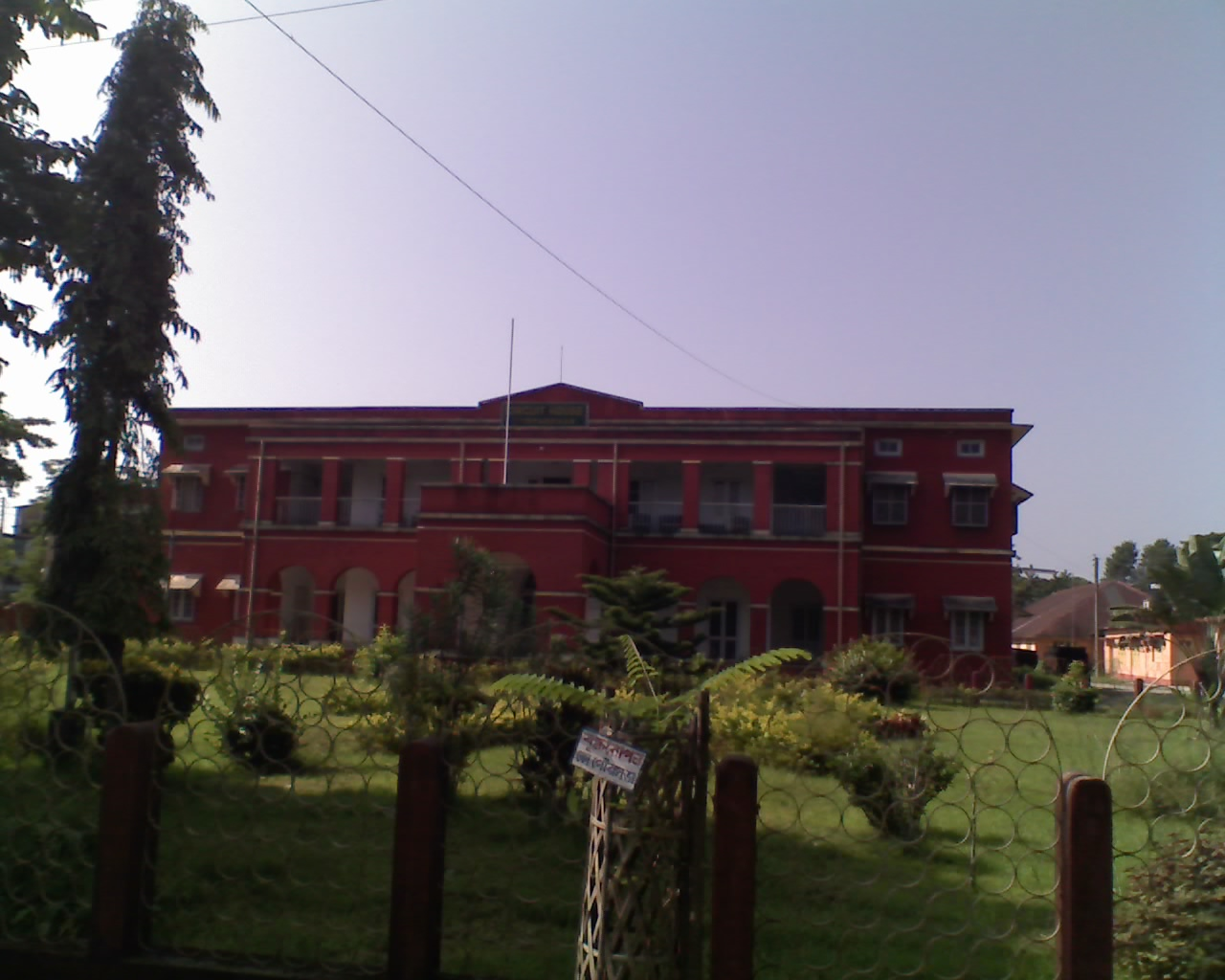
Circuit House

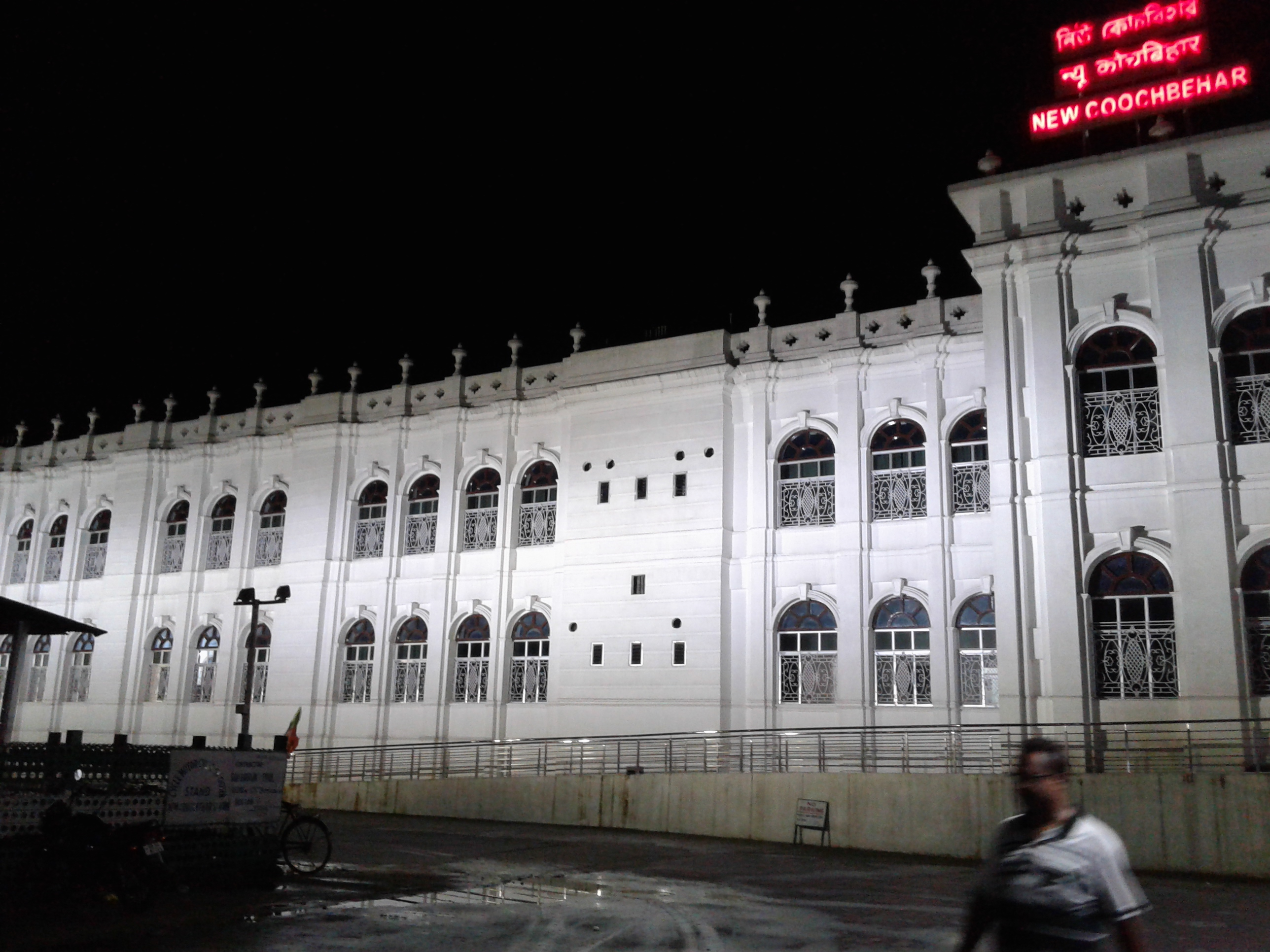
New Cooch Behar at night

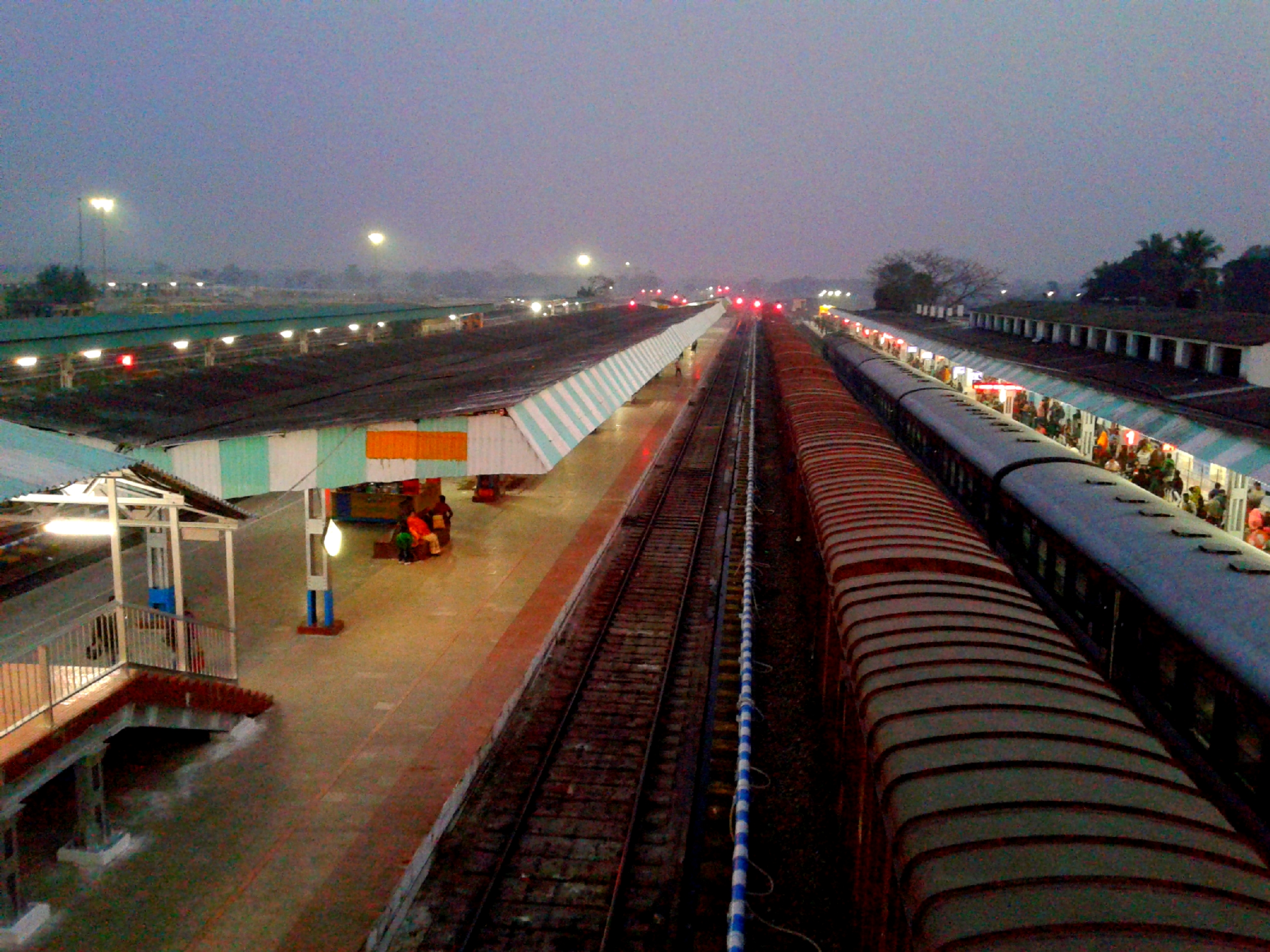
New Cooch Behar Junction

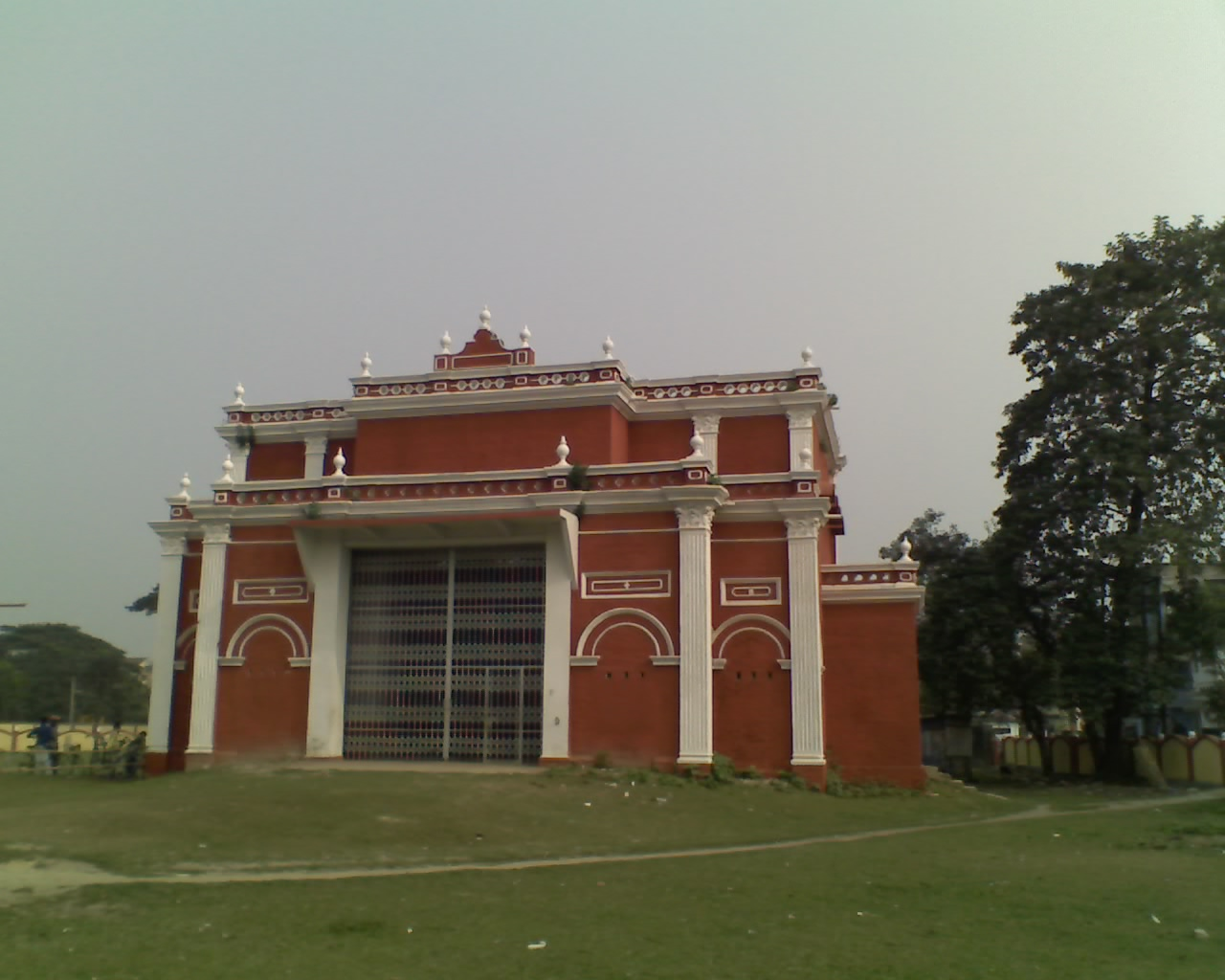
Debi Bari Cooch Behar

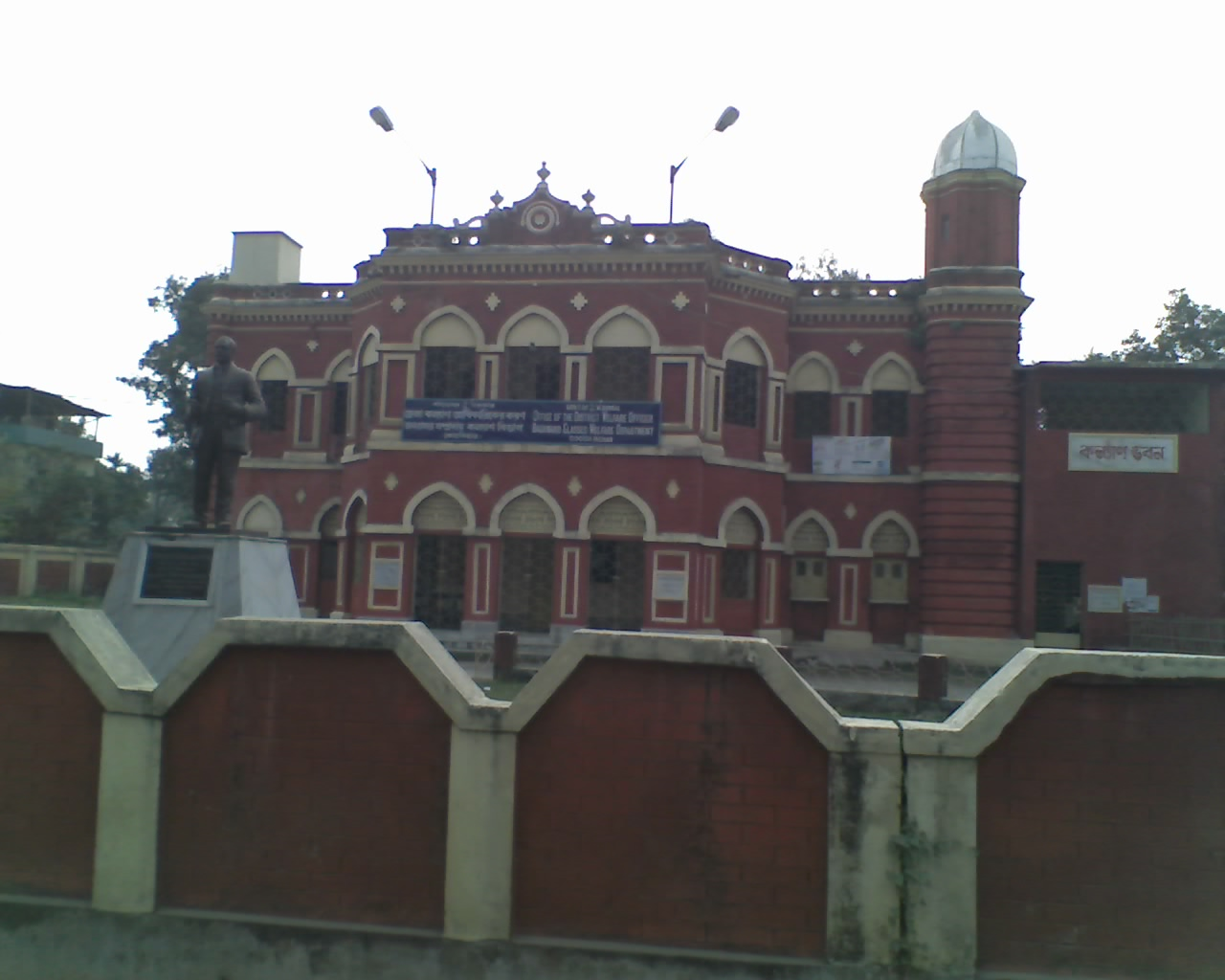
Moti Mahal

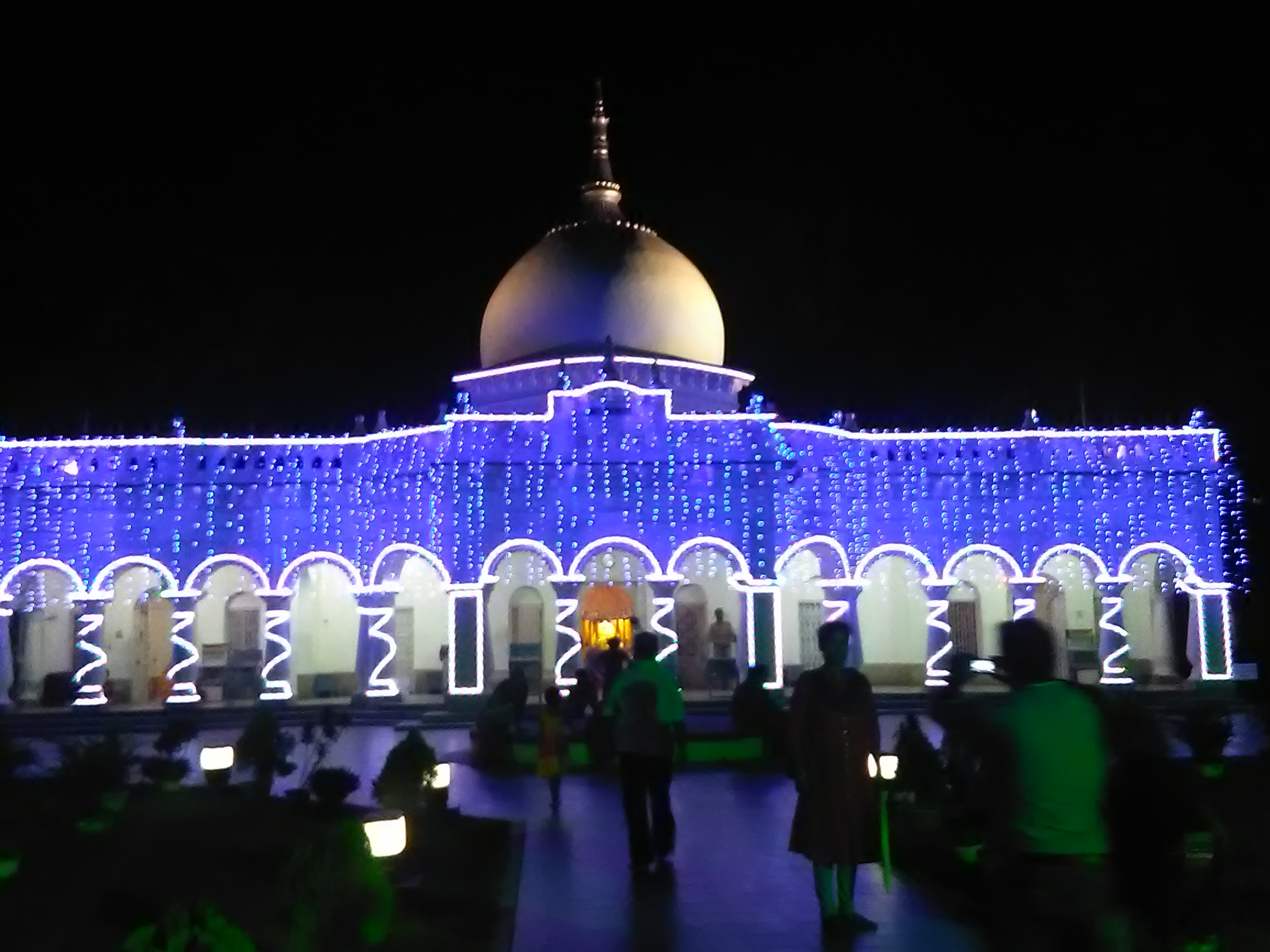
Madanmohan Temple at night

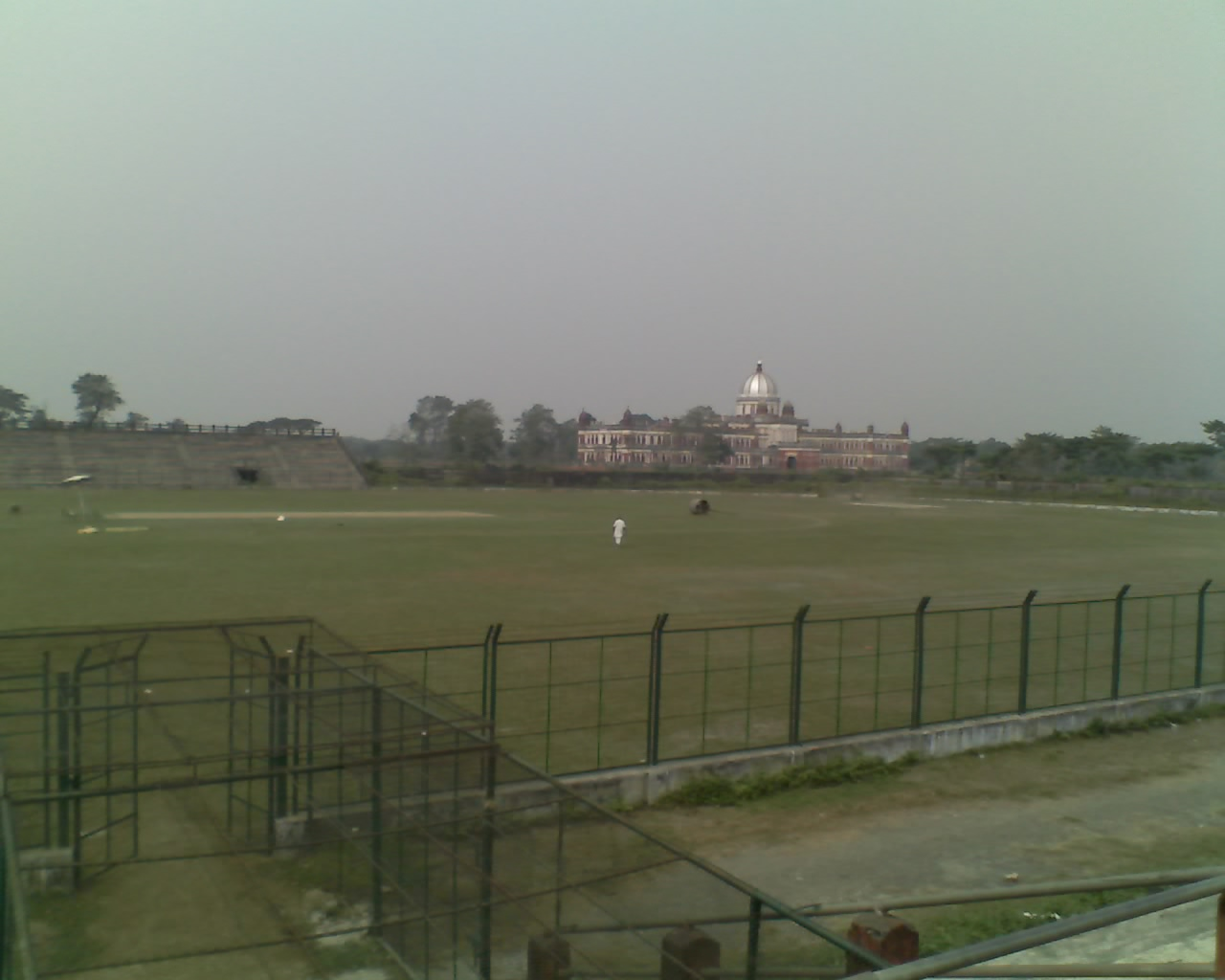
Palace view from the stadium

== See also ==
- Madan Mohan Temple, a temple dedicated to Madan Mohan
- Narendra Narayan Park, a botanical garden in town, founded in 1892
- Cooch Behar Stadium, a multi-purpose stadium
- European Cemetery, Cooch Behar, a British colonial cemetery
