= Maya Chitram Art Institute =

Art school in Cooch Behar, India

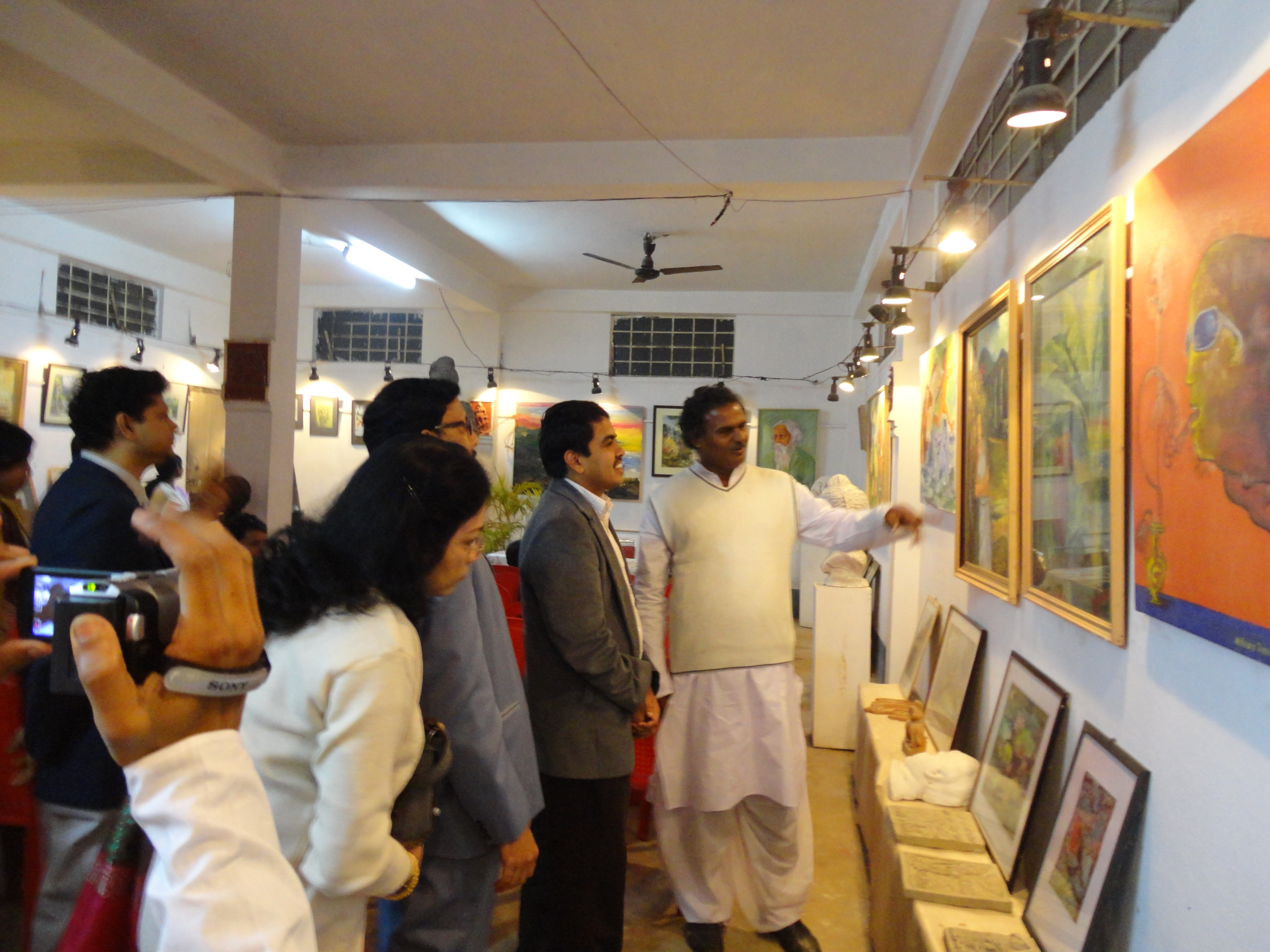
- Exhibition in Uday Shankar Art Gallery
- Cooch Behar, West Bengal; India

Information
- Opened: 1981
- Website: www.mayachitram.org

Maya Chitram Art Institute, located in Cooch Behar, West Bengal, India, has been a non-profit educational organization since 1981.

== Objective ==
From the institute's website:

The institute runs as non profit organization that has the primary objectives of preserving and fostering the spirit of art culture among the children and youth as its beckoning light has been rendering sincere and dedicated services to society on the one hand it is initiating young talents into the realm of fine art through a sound training method and on the other is providing scholarship and other assistance to the deserving and needy students who go for higher education.

A non-governmental organization (NGO) focused on societal issues, its key concerns are human rights and art & culture.

== History ==
The institute was founded in 1981. In 1997 it inaugurated a permanent art gallery, the Uday Shankar Exhibition Hall, which is named for professional dancer Uday Shankar.

== Management ==
Maya Chitram Art Institute, a non-governmental organization (NGO), is part of the Nehru Yuva Club Hathipur Chittu organization. It is managed by the following individuals:

- Karuna Bhattacharjee, Chief Functionary and Secretary
- Dipti Chattopadhaya, Chairman
- Jagadish Barman, Treasurer

It has been registered with the Registrar of Societies since 11 August 1981. Within West Bengal, its operational districts include Cooch Behar, Darjeeling, Jalpaiguri, and Malda.

== Facilities ==
- Uday Shankar Exhibition Hall

== Programs ==
- Art exhibits are held at the Calcutta Information Centre and Academy of Fine Arts, Calcutta
- Provide scholarships to eligible students, as awarded by Governor of West Bengal
