= Sagardighi, Bangladesh =

Coordinates: 24.4707°N 90.1959°E

Sagardighi is a village in Dhalapara Union under Ghatail Upazila of Tangail District, Bangladesh.

== Demographics ==
According to the 2011 Bangladesh census, Sagardighi had 416 households and a population of 1,980. 12.0% of the population was under the age of 5. The literacy rate (age 7 and over) was 59.1%, compared to the national average of 51.8%.

== Education ==
There is one higher secondary school, Sagardighi College.

There are two secondary schools, Sagardighi High School and Sagardighi Girls High School.
