= Sagardighi (Cooch Behar, India) =

Lake in West Bengal, India

Cooch Behar Sagardighi
- কোচবিহার সাগরদিঘি (Bengali)
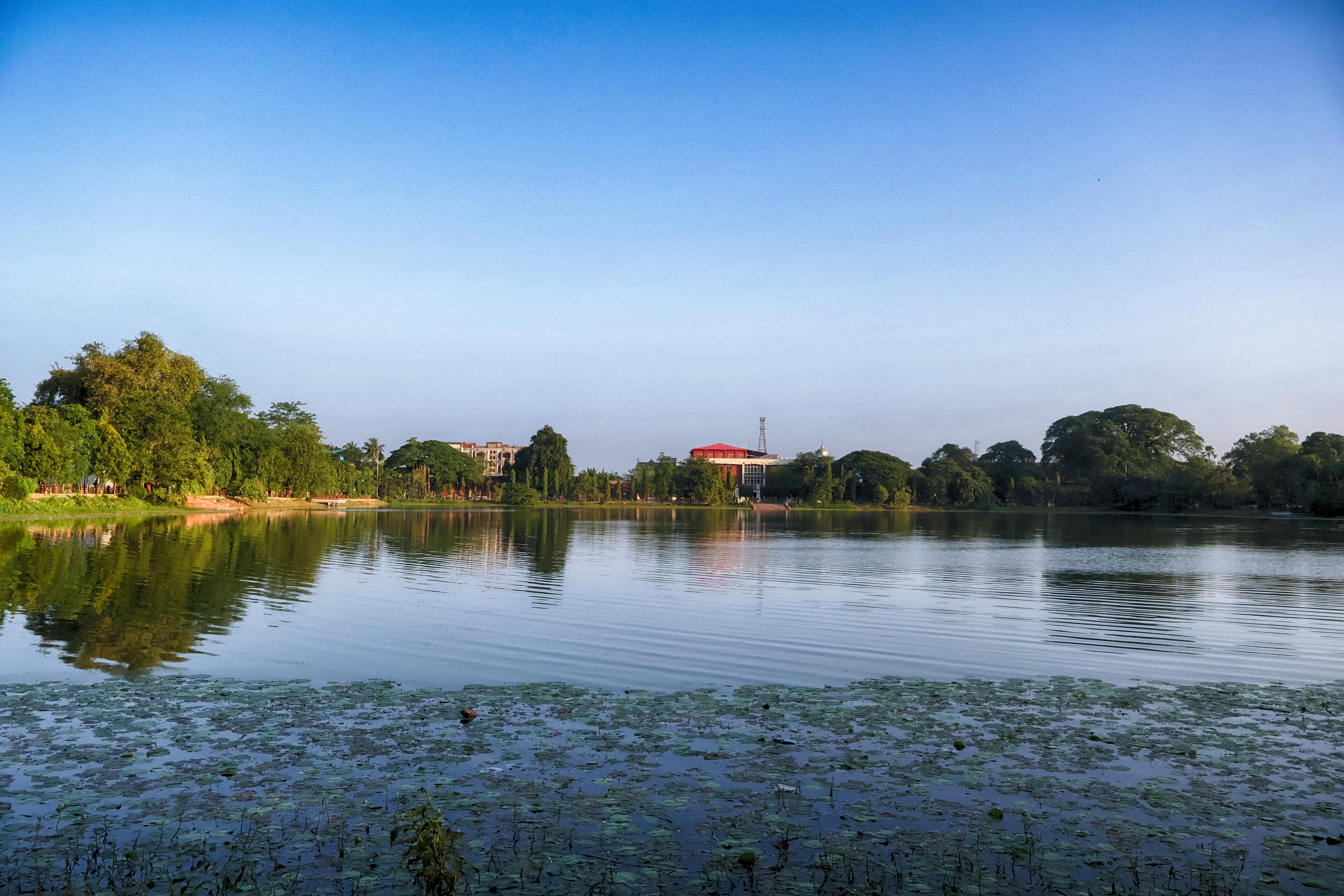
- Sagar Dighi, Cooch Behar
- Location: Cooch Behar, West Bengal, India
- Interactive map of Cooch Behar Sagardighi

Sagardighi or Sagar Dighi is a lake in Cooch Behar, India, boasting a diverse array of migratory birds. The lake is also home to endangered the Indian peacock soft shelled turtles (Nilssonia hurum).

Many government offices and administrative buildings envelop the lake. They include the buildings of North Bengal State Transport Corporation, the Office of the Superintendent of Police, DLRO and State Bank of India's Cooch Behar main branch. Heading North, there are the RTO Office, The Foreigner's Registration Office and District Court are also close by. Municipality Office Building.

Devotees conduct Chhath Puja at Sagardighi lake every year.
