= Cooch Behar State =

Former kingdom and princely state located south of Bhutan, now in West Bengal, India

Coordinates: 26.2°N 89.0°E

Cooch Behar
- 1586–1950
- Flag Coat of arms

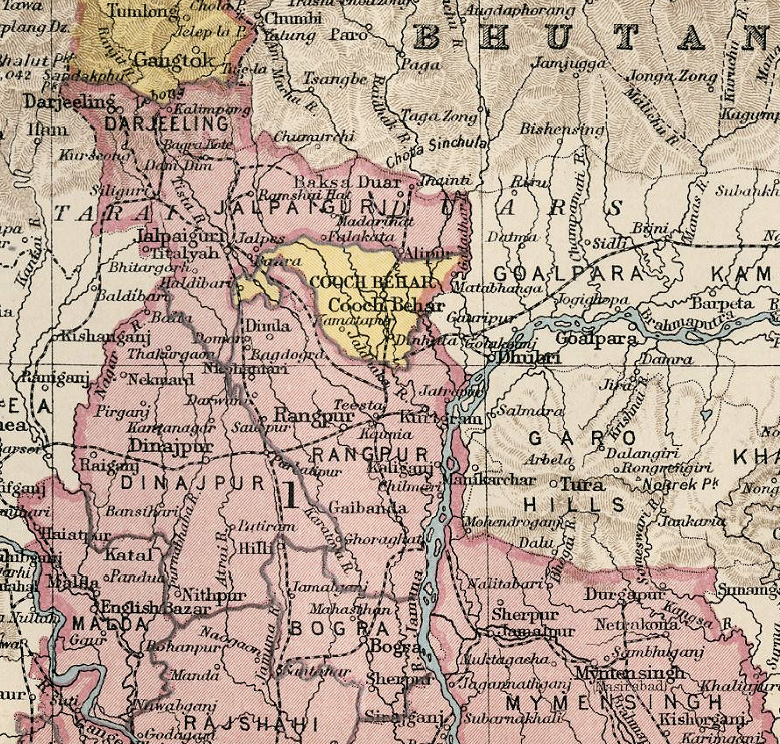
- Cooch Behar and vicinity from the Imperial Gazetteer of India, 1931
- Status: Mughal vassal (1609–1661, 1664—1707); Tributary of Bhutan (1730–1773); Protectorate of the British East India Company (1773–1858); Princely State of the British Raj (1858–1947); Princely State of India (1947–1950)
- Capital: Kamatapur (1515–1693); Cooch Behar (1693–1950)
- History
  - Established: 1586
  - Mughal vassalization: 1609
  - Acceded to the Indian Union: 1950

Area
- 1901: 3,385 km^{2} (1,307 sq mi)
Preceded by	Succeeded by
Kamata Kingdom	Cooch Behar District
- Today part of: India, Bangladesh, Nepal

Cooch Behar State
- Part of History of Assam
- Part of History of Bengal
Kings of Cooch Behar
Lakshmi Narayan	1586–1621
Bir Narayan	1621–1626
Pran Narayan	1626–1665
Madan Narayan	1665–1680
Basudev Narayan	1680–1682
Mahendra Narayan	1682–1693
Rup Narayan	1693–1714
Upendra Narayana	1714–1763
Debendra Narayana	1763–1765
Regent	1763–1765
Dhairjendra Narayan	1765–1770
Rajendra I Narayan	1770–1772
Pensuthma –Bhutanese Regent	1770–1772
Dharendra Narayan	1772
Bijendra Narayan	1772–1774
Dharendra Narayan	1774–1775
Dhairjendra Narayan	1775–1783
Harendra Narayan	1783–1839
Regents	1783–1801
Bajendra Narayan	1836–1839
Shivendra Narayan	1839–1847
Narendra Narayan	1847–1863
Bajendra Narayan	1847–1857
Regents	1857–1860
Nripendra Narayan	1863–1911
Regents	1863–1883
Raj Rajendra Narayan	1911–1913
Jitendra Narayan	1913–1922
Indira Devi (Regent)	1922–1938
Jagaddipendra Narayan	1922–1949

Cooch Behar monarchy data
- Raikat (Royal family)
- Cooch Behar (Capital of the kingdom)
- Cooch Behar Palace (Royal residence)

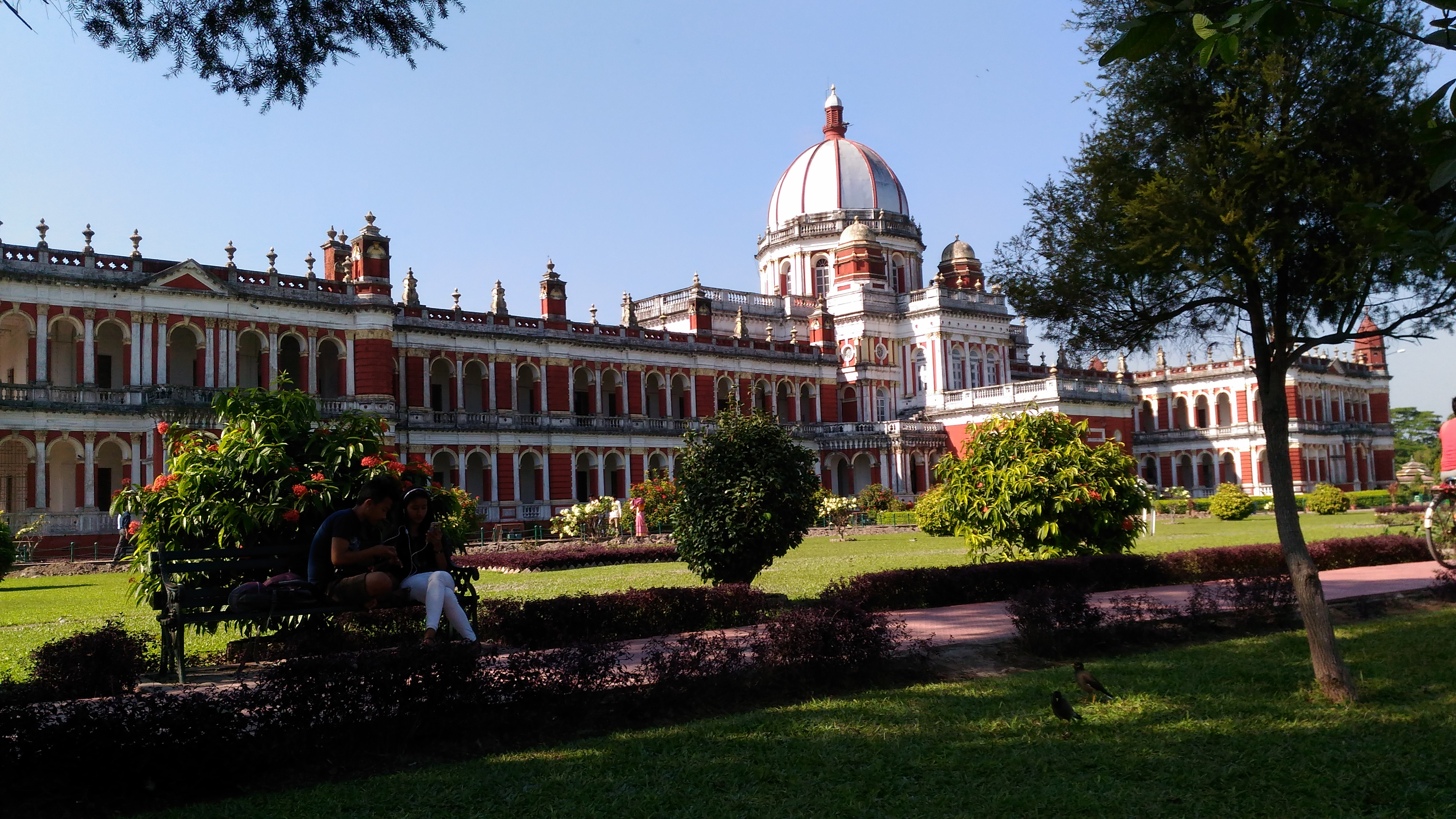
The Cooch Behar Palace

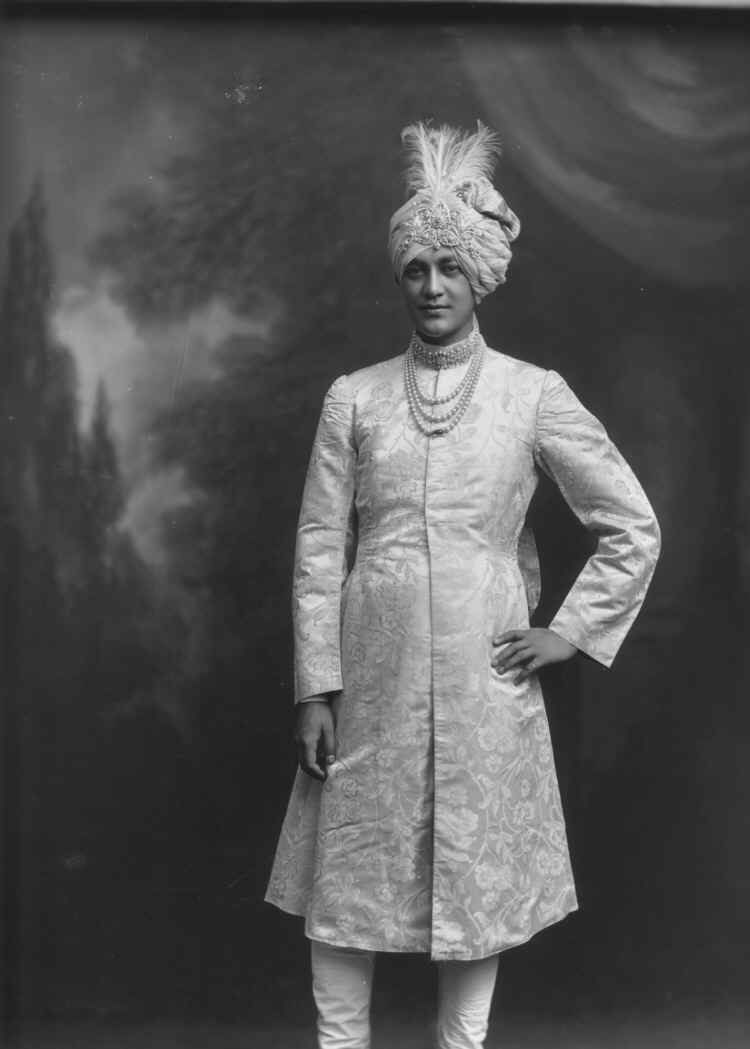
Maharaja Sir Jitendra Narayan Bhup Bahadur

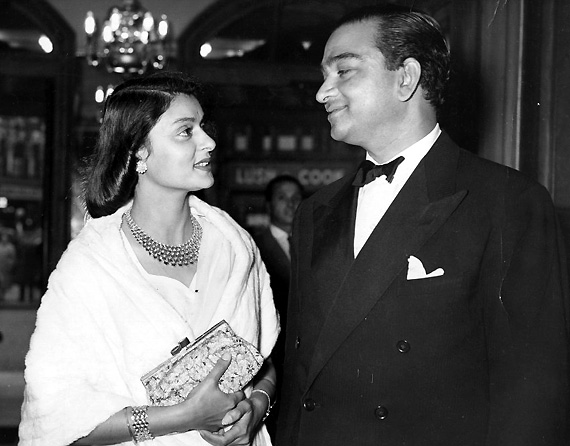
Maharani Gayatri Devi, Rajmata of Jaipur, born as Princess Gayatri Devi of Cooch Behar, with her husband Man Singh II, the last ruling Maharaja of Jaipur State

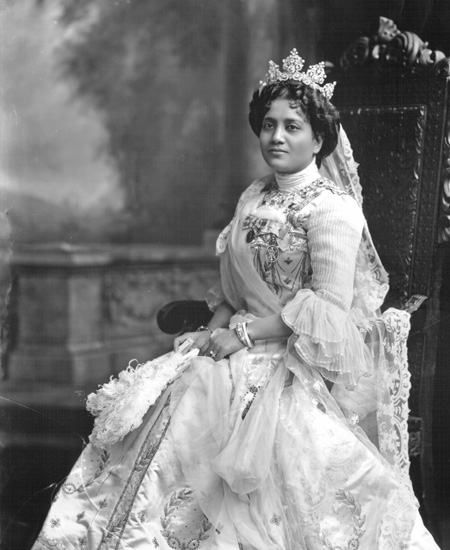
Maharani Suniti Devi

Cooch Behar, also known as Koch Bihar, was a princely state in India during the British Raj. The state was placed under the Bengal States Agency, part of the Eastern States Agency of the Bengal Presidency. It was located south of the Himalayan kingdom of Bhutan, in present-day West Bengal.

Cooch Behar State was formed when the Kamata Kingdom under the Koch dynasty split following the death of Nara Narayan in 1586. The eastern portion, Koch Hajo, was soon absorbed by Ahom. The western portion, Koch Bihar, formed a separate unit that came under direct challenge from the Mughal Empire. After weathering the Mughal threat, a new foe emerged in the form of an expansionist Bhutanese kingdom. After a series of wars with the Bhutanese and Tibetans, the Northern threat was pushed back but not before a Bhutanese regent was installed in the royal court. The Koch Bihar court decided to invite British intervention. This came in the form of military assistance that—acting in concert with Koch Bihar forces—ended the Northern challenge once and for all. However the British East India Company sought guarantees whereby the independence of Koch Bihar was limited by treaties. When the British colonial rule was finally terminated in India, the Koch Bihar state immediately acceded to and merged with India in 1949 and became a part of West Bengal. The district, Cooch Behar District, is named after this erstwhile kingdom.

== History ==
=== Early history: Mughal conflicts (1587–1680) ===
The Kamata kingdom split at a time when the Mughals under Akbar were aggressively expanding their empire. The state soon became a dependency of, and slowly lost territory to, the Mughal empire. In 1609, Kuch Bihar became a vassal state of Mughal Empire.

Lakshmi Narayan (1587–1621), Nara Narayan's son, was the first ruler of the Koch Bihar portion of the former Kamata kingdom. He was an ineffectual ruler. After losing much territory to the Mughal commander Ali Kuli Khan, he accepted Mughal sovereignty and assistance in defending against his neighbours. The next Mughal emperor, Jahangir, again attacked Bihar and captured territory including Tripura. Lakshmi Narayan went to Delhi and won guarantees for his much-reduced state. On his return, he established his capital at the Atharokotha village. Lakshmi Narayan was a patron of scholars and the arts. He partially restored the Shiva temple of Jalpesh, but did not complete construction of the temple during his lifetime. Influenced by Madhavdeva, a famous preacher, he made Ekasarana dharma, the state religion.

Bir Narayan (1621–1626), Lakshmi Narayan's son and successor, was a pleasure-loving ruler who failed to exert his authority to levy taxes on the king of Bhutan. In his peaceful reign, he sponsored schools for the aristocracy and supported intellectuals. His successor Pran Narayan (1626–1665) ruled in peace until 1657, when a struggle for succession in the Mughal empire began between Aurangzeb and his brothers. Pran Narayan invaded Bengal. However, by this time Aurangzeb had consolidated his power and sent his armies to invade Bihar and Assam. Pran Narayan retreated to the mountains and waged a guerrilla war for three years, finally having to make a pact with the Mughal Nawab Shaista Khan in 1664. During his rule, the Behar kingdom expanded to Tajhat Baharband Pargana in the south, Basakpur near Khutaghat of Goalapara district in the east and Bhatgaon within Morang in the west. Thus Koch Bihar maintained some of its sovereignty.

Madan Narayan or Mod Narayan (1665–1680) succeeded Pran Narayan after a short struggle with his brothers. For some time, the power behind the throne was Mahi Narayan, who had been Nazir (summoner) for his father. After a fierce struggle, Madan Narayan gained control and Mahi Narayan fled to Bhutan. Madan Narayan began a survey of his lands and a register of landholdings. He completed the construction of the Jalpesh Shiva temple, providing lands for the temple's maintenance.

=== Conflict with Bhutan and Tibet (1680–1772) ===
Raja Prasanna Dev Raikat and Rani Deela Devi in Darjeeling

The growing power of Bhutan saw the turmoil in Behar and the waning authority of the Mughals as an opportunity to extend their influence and control. They provided support to competitors for the throne of Koch Bihar, and later attempted outright annexation. From the early 17th century the Kingdom of Bhutan came to control the fertile plains as far as the Gohain Kamal Ali road. The Druk Desi of Bhutan appointed Tongso Penlop to govern the Duars of Koch Hajo and Koch Behar then under the rule of the Koch dynasty till the Duar Wars in 1865 when British India removed the Bhutanese influence from the Duars under the Treaty of Sinchula and the areas under the Eastern Duars, Kamrup Duars, Darrang Duars were merged to Goalpara district, Kamrup district, Darrang district of Assam and the Western Duars to Jalpaiguri district of West Bengal of the Indian Union in 1949.

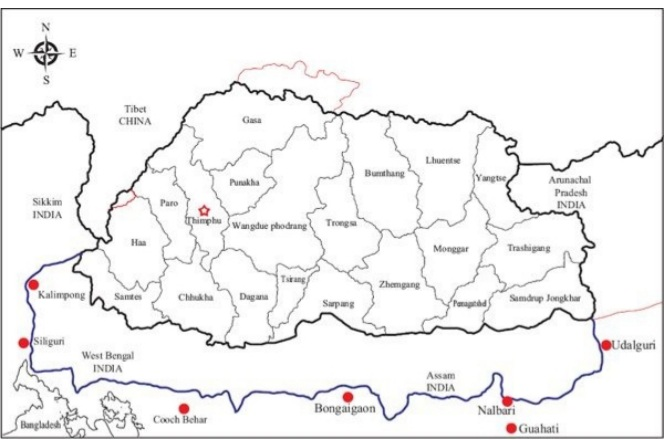
Bhutan controlled the Duars of Koch Hajo and Koch Behar till the Duar War of 1865

On the death of Madan Narayan with no immediate successor, the sons of the Nazir Mahi Narayan attacked Behar, assisted by the Bhutan army. The Raikats of Baikunthapur, distant relatives of the royal family based in the Jalpaiguri area, sent troops and helped force the Bhutia army to retreat. The Raikats crowned Basudev Narayan (1680–1682), Madan Narayan's brother, as Maharajah and helped establish peace before returning to their home. Two years later, Yajna Narayan and Jagat Narayan (sons of Nazir Mahi) attacked Behar again with Bhutanese troops, captured the palace and massacred the royal family, including Basudev Narayan. The Raikats Yogyadev and Bhujdev intervened again, defeating Yajna Narayan in a battle on the banks of the Mansai river. The Raikats then crowned Mahendra Narayan (1682–1693), a five-year-old grandson of Pran Narayan, as the next Maharajah.

During the minority rule of Mahendra Narayan, the state was unsettled. The lords of places such as Tepa, Manthana Kakina and Karjirhat rejected Bihari rule in place of direct tribute to the Mughal rulers as zamindars (landlords) of their territories. They accepted the authority of, and paid taxes to, Ibrahim Khan the Mughal Faujdar of Ghoraghat and Dhaka. Even the Raikat princes of Baikunthapur and Pangar transferred loyalty to these powers. The Mughals chose this time to attack Behar. With no other choice, Mahendra made a pact with Yajna Narayan and appointed him as Nazir. Aided by the Bhutanese, Yajna Narayan fought the Mughals at Patgram but was defeated. The Mughals took Boda, Patgram and eastern Pargana in the year 1711 and had gained near full control of North Bengal once again.

Mahendra Narayan died at the age of 16. With the main royal line extinct, Rup Narayan (1693–1714), a grandson of Nazir Mahi Narayan, became the next Maharajah. Rup Narayan was a strong and popular ruler, but made the mistake of attacking the Mughal Faujdar of Rangpur. Defeated, he lost Karjihat, Kakina and Fatehpur Chakla, retaining only Boda, Patgram and eastern Chakla. Soon after, he lost these territories too, and was reduced to holding the three Chaklas under lease to the Mughals in the name of his Najir. He moved his capital from Atharokotha to a new site, Guriahati on the east bank of the Torsa River, where he built a temple of Sri Madan Mohan Thakur.

Upendra Narayan (1714–1763), the next ruler, had no son of his own. He adopted Deena Narayan, the son of dewan Satya Narayan, and gave him considerable powers, but did not formally grant him the succession to the throne. Deena Narayan met the Mughal Faujdar Md. Ali Khan at Rangpur and agreed to accept Mughal supremacy in return for Md. Ali Khan's support in gaining the throne. Md. Ali Khan invaded, but was forced back by a combined army from Behar and Bhutan and had to flee to Rangpur.

Late in life, Upendra Narayan's second queen gave birth to a male child, Debendra Narayan (1763–1765), who ascended the throne at the age of four. His short reign was chaotic. The Bhutias annexed further land in the north of Behar, and their ambassador in the capital of Behar became the de facto ruler of the state. The young maharaja was assassinated in a palace plot at the age of six.

On 12 August 1765, the British East India Company took over control of Bengal. The Maharaja of Bihar now had to pay rent to the East India company for Boda, Patgram, Panga and other chaklas in Bengal that they had previously paid to Mughal administration.

After Debendra Narayan's assassination, Debraj, king of Bhutan, sent troops to arrest Rajguru Ramananda Goswami, the leader of the assassination plot. The Behar court agreed to crown Dhairjendra Narayan (1765–1770), a cousin of Debendra Narayan, as Maharaja. However, he was a puppet of Bhutan: the Bhutanese ambassador Pensuthma was the effective ruler. Bhutan seized direct control of Behar territories including Jalpeswar, Mandas, Jalash, Lakshmipur, Santarabari, Maraghat and Bholka. During this time there was large scale famine. The court degenerated into intrigues and conspiracies. Eventually, Debraj of Bhutan arrested Dhairjendra Narayan and took him to the Bhutanese capital Punakh, crowning Rajendra Narayan (1770–1772) in his place as nominal ruler. After a short "reign", Rajendra Narayan died of a fever in 1772.

Maharaja Rajendra Narayan left no heir. The Bhutias attempted to take over direct control, seizing the royal regalia, but the court rebelled and enthroned Dharendra Narayan (1772–1775). The Koch warlords once again rallied their banners and chased the Bhutanese-Tibetan-Khampa forces out of the Northern areas of Koch Behar. Pensuthma -the Bhutanese regent- fled back to Bhutan, whose King sent troops to invade Behar. After some fighting, the Bhutanese regained control and established a new puppet ruler, a child whom they installed in Chekakhata in Bhutan. On his early death, the Bhutias finally attempted direct control, garrisoning forts in strategic positions. However most tracts of the extensive North Bengal region remained fiercely opposed to any Northern control. As, for example, an important warlord — Rupan Singh of Rahimganj Pargana — maintained that the Bhutanese presence in North Bengal was illegal and issued directives to the Bhutan court to pull back their forces.

=== British East India Company acquires control ===
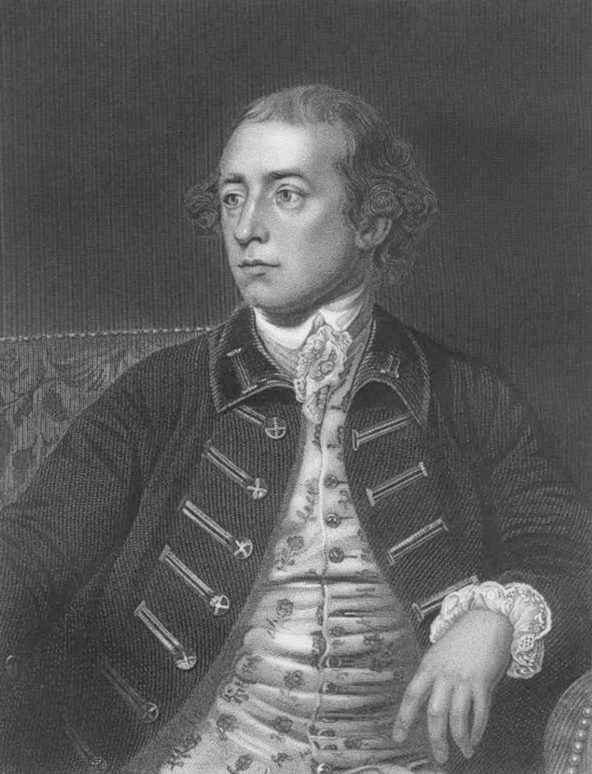
Warren Hastings, first Governor General of Bengal

Maharaja Dharendra Narayan appealed to the British, rulers of Bengal, for assistance in regaining his kingdom in exchange for a large payment. However, the Governor General Warren Hastings rejected the terms and insisted on an agreement by which the Maharaja would pay an annual tribute to the Company in exchange for protection: in effect an agreement to accept the supremacy of the British. The British then sent a regiment commanded by Mr. Paling from Kalikata (Calcutta/Kolkata) who marched through Rangpur towards Mughalhat, joined on their route by Behar forces from all the warlords and the chiefs of North Bengal. After a series of sharp encounters with the Bhutanese forces, the British-Koch coalition force captured the capital (1772) and moved forward into southern Bhutan.

Unwilling to go further into the difficult hill country, the British negotiated a peace agreement (25 April 1774) with Bhutan in exchange for surrender of Bihar royal captives, Bhutan agreeing to return to its pre-1730 boundaries, and a symbolic tribute of five horses. The British left a small garrison in Behar, and withdrew the main army to Rangpur. When Dhairjendra Narayan realised that he had exchanged one master for another, and had permanently lost independence of his ancestral land, he abdicated in favour of Dharendra Narayan, who reigned until his death in 1775, when Dhairjendra Narayan resumed the throne (1775–1783)

From then on, until the transfer of control to the State of India in 1947, Koch Behar was a princely state subject to overall British suzerainty.

Subsequent princely rulers under the British East India company were Harendra Narayan (1783–1839), followed by Shivendra Narayan (1839–1847) and then by Narendra Narayan (1847–1863).

=== Rulers ===
The rulers of Cooch Behar State held the title of 'Maharaja' from 1884 onwards. They were entitled to a 13-gun salute by the British authorities. The last ruler signed the instrument of accession to the Indian Union on 1 January 1950.

==== Rajas ====
- 1533 - 1587 Nara Narayan
- 1587 – 1621 Lakshmi Narayan
- 1621 – 1626 Bir Narayan
- 1626 – 1665 Pran Narayan
- 1665 – 1680 Mad Narayan
- 1680 – 1682 Basudev Narayan
- 1682 – 1693 Mahendra Narayan
- 1693 – 1714/1715 Rup Narayan
- 1714/1715 – 1763 Upendra Narayana
- 1763 – 12 August 1765 Debendra Narayana
- 1765 – 1770 Dhairjendra Narayan (1st time)
- 1770 – 1772 Rajendra Narayan
- 1770 – 1772 Pensuthma -Bhutanese Regent
- 1772 Dharendra Narayan (1st time)
- 1772 – 1774 Bijendra Narayan
- 1774 – 1775 Dharendra Narayan (2nd time)
- 1775 – 1783 Dhairjendra Narayan (2nd time)
- 1783 – 29 May 1839 Harendra Narayan
- 1836 – 1839 Bajendra Narayan -Regent (1st time)
- 29 May 1839 – 23 August 1847 Shivendra Narayan
- 23 August 1847 – 6 August 1863 Narendra Narayan
- 30 March 1847 – 1857 Bajendra Narayan - Regent (2nd time)
- 6 August 1863 – 16 October 1911 Nripendra Narayan
- 1911 – 1913 Raj Rajendra Narayan
- 1913 – 1922 Jitendra Narayan
- 1922-1938 Regent Indrani Devi
- 1922 – 1949 – Jagaddipendra Narayan

== Consorts of Cooch Behar ==
Picture	Name	Parents	Birth	Marriage	Became consort	Ceased to be consort	Death	Spouse
	Suniti Sen	Keshub Chandra Sen and Jaganmohini Devi Majumdar	30 September 1864	1878	8 November 1883 Spouse's accession	6 February 1952 Spouse's death	68 years, 10 days	Maharaja Nripendra Narayan I
	Princess Indira Raje of Baroda	Sayajirao Gaekwad III of Baroda and Princess Gajra Ghatge	19 February 1892	1913	1 September 1913 Spouse's accession	6 February 1952 Spouse's death	76 years, 200 days	Maharaja Jitendra Narayan I

== Later princes and notables ==
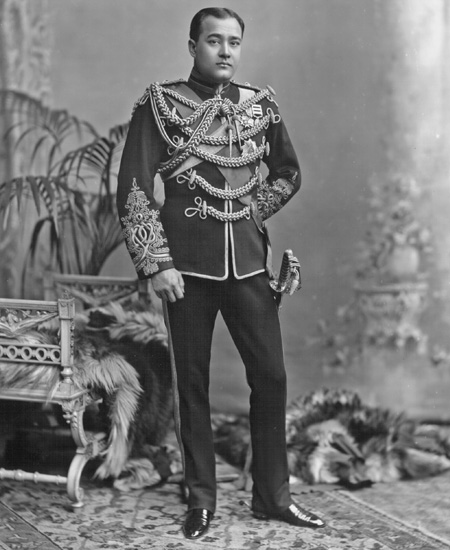
Shri Sir Nripendra Narayan, Maharaja of Cooch Behar (1862–1911), seen here in the dismounted review order uniform of a British officer of the 6th Prince of Wales's Bengal Cavalry

Following the Indian Mutiny, the British East India Company was dissolved, replaced by direct rule from the British government: the British Raj. Although the princely state of Cooch Behar was very small, it enjoyed a certain prominence since it was one of the very few states to lie within relatively easy distance of Calcutta, the hub of the British Raj. Due to this proximity, the Royal Family embraced westernisation and this resulted in the family enjoying an ascendancy in British official circles, as well as in London society. The colonial government granted it 13-gun salutes and included it in the Salute States.

=== The family in the 20th century ===
==== First generation in the 20th century ====
Col. Maharaja Sir Nripendra Narayan (ruled 1863–1911) was born on 4 October 1862. He died on 18 September 1911. and was educated privately and later in England. He was admitted to Presidency College, Calcutta, to study Law till 1881. He was married in 1878 to Maharani Suniti Devi Sen, who was born in 1864 and was the daughter of Maharishi Keshub Chandra Sen. He was conferred the title of Imperial Order of Crown on the occasion of Queen Victoria's Jubilee celebrations. He died in 1911. They had four sons and three daughters.

Maharani Sunity Devi was born to famous Bengali reformer Kesub Chandra Sen. She was a staunch member of the Brahmo Samaj up until her death. She was married to Maharaja Nripendra Narayan on 7 February 1878 in Cooch Behar according to Bhrahmo Traditions and in the presence of Hindu priests. She was also a friend of the Marchioness of Dufferin, and was a popular figure in the Calcutta social circles. She also composed several works of fiction and an autobiography. One of her works of fiction included a series of stories about pious Indian women. This book was dedicated to her friend Queen Alexandra. She died in Bengal Nagpur Railway Hotel, Ranchi in November 1932.

==== Second generation in the 20th century ====
Maharaja Raj Rajendra Narayan Bhup Bahadur (ruled 1911–13) was born on 11 April 1882 in Calcutta, and died unmarried 1 September 1913 in London. His ashes were buried in Cooch Behar. He was educated at Mayo College, Ajmer, in 1893, and then was sent to England in 1894 for further studies, gaining entry into an Oxford College in 1900.

Maharaja Jitendra Narayan Bhup Bahadur (ruled 1913–22) was born on 20 December 1886 at Cooch Behar Palace. He has the brother of the previous Maharaja. He died on 20 December 1922. He was educated privately under a British home tutor, and then admitted to Itan School in 1900. Later, he was admitted to the University of Edinburgh. He was married on 25 August 1913 in London to Maharani Indira Devi (1892–1968). She was the daughter of Maharaja Gaekwad Sir Sayajiro III Khanderao Gaekwad, Sena Khas Khel Shamsher Bahadur Farzand-i-Khas-i-Daulat-i-Inglishia of Baroda, and his second wife, Maharani Gajra Bai.

Maharaj Kumari Sukriti Devi ("Princess Girlie") was born in 1884. She died 1958. She was married in 1899 (sep'd.) to Jyotsnanath Ghosal, C.I.E., I.C.S. [cr.1918], the Zamindar of Belgaum, and had issue.

The younger daughters of Maharaja Nripendra Narayan and Maharani Sunity Devi, were named Pravita Devi and Sudhira Devi. They were born in 1891 and 1894 respectively. They were married to a pair of siblings called Lionel Mander and Alan Mander respectively. Pravita Devi had no issue. Sudhira Devi had two daughters Geeta and Garbo and a son Derek. Garbo is presently residing at London.

==== Third generation in the 20th century ====
Ila Devi, the eldest child of the Maharaja Jitendra Narayan and his wife Maharani Indira Devi, was born in 1914. Her name was suggested by Lord Carmichael, the then Governor of Bengal and a close friend of the Maharaja. She attended Ravenscroft School in Eastbourne. She later went to Santiniketan along with her sister Gayatri, and met her future husband Romendro Kishore Deb Burman, a cousin of the Maharaja of Tripura. They were married secretly in a register office in 1935 and were formally married the same year. They had three children, Manabendra (Bhim), Devika and Bharat (Habi). She died in 1945 at the age of thirty.

Lt.Col. (Hon) Maharaja Sir Jagaddipendra Narayan Bhup Bahadur (ruled 1922–1970) was born on 15 December 1915 at Cooch Behar Palace, and died on 11 April 1970 in Calcutta. He was educated at Harrow in 1927–1929 and Trinity Hall, Cambridge, in 1929–1934. He was awarded the K.C.I.E. [cr.1945] and was made the 7th Light Cavalry in the Indian Army. He served in World War II, and was granted full ruling powers on 6 April 1936. He married firstly about 1950 (div.) Nancy Valentine who was born on St. Albans, Long Island, and who was a Hollywood actress. He married secondly Gina Egan.

Maharaj Kumar Indrajit Narayan was the second son and the third child of Maharaja Nripendra Narayan and his wife Maharani Indira Devi. He was born in 1918 in Poona, Bombay State. He went a day school in London and was also educated in England later. He passed out of the Indian Military Academy at Dehra Dun and obtained a commission in the 7th Light Cavalry at Bolarum. He was engaged in 1942 to the Princess of Pithapuram, Kamala Devi. They were married soon after. They had two children, Uttara Devi and Maharaja Vijendra Narayan of Cooch Behar. He died in 1951 in Darjeeling from a fire.

Maharani Gayatri Devi was born on 23 May 1919 in London. She was educated at Shantiniketan, Lausanne, Switzerland, London School of Secretaries, Brilliantmont and Monkey Club London. She was married on 9 May 1940 to Saramad-i-Rajahai Hindustan Raj Rajendra Shri Maharajadhiraj Sir Sawai Man Singh II Bahadur of Jaipur, and they had issue. She was the president of the All India Badminton Association, the vice-president of the All India Lawn Tennis Association, the All India Swatantra Party, and the Rajasthan State Swatantra Party. She was the director of the Rambagh Palace Hotel, Jaipur, and Gee Stud Farm Pvt Ltd., chairman of the Governing Council of Maharani Gayatri Devi Girls Public School, Jaipur, chairman of the board of trustees of Maharaja Sawai Jai Singh Benevolent Trust, Jaipur, the Maharani Gayatri Soldier's Welfare Fund, Jaipur; the Sawai Ram Singh Shilp Kala Mandir, Jaipur; M/s Jaipur Durries Pvt Ltd, Jalpur and Rajasthan State Tourist Development Corporation, Jaipur; Member of the 3rd, 4th and 5th Lok Sabha; author of A Princess Remembers and A Government's Gateway; interests include photography, fine arts and museums.

Menaka Devi, the third daughter and the youngest child of Maharaja Nripendra Narayan and his wife Maharani Indira Devi was born in 1920 in London. She was married to Yeshwantrao Singh, the Maharaja of Dewas Jr and had a son Udaya

==== Fourth and last generation in the 20th century ====
Maharaja Virajendra Narayan, the son of Indrajit Narayan and Kamala Devi was born in 1944. He was instilled as the Maharaja only after his uncle's death in 1970. His accession to the throne was a symbolic gesture and had no temporal significance. He died in 1992.

Uttara Devi, the daughter of Indrajit Narayan and Kamala Devi was born in 1942. She is married to the Maharao Brijraj Singh of Kotah. She has two children.

==== Famous women of the Cooch Behar family ====
As the Maharani of Cooch Behar, Indira Raje ruled as regent after her husband's early death at the age of 36, and later became popular in the salons of Europe, earning the sobriquet "the ranee of Cooch". She was popularly known as Ma In Cooch Behar and other social circles of Calcutta.

=== Sports culture ===
Both association football and cricket were practiced by rulers and noblemen in Cooch Behar State. Cooch Behar Cup, which was originated in the state in 1893, became one of the prestigious football tournament in the continental Asia, organised by Indian Football Association (IFA).

== See also ==
- Rajbongshi people
- Cooch Behar Municipality
- Cooch Behar Palace
- Eastern States Agency
- Political integration of India
- Hussain Muhammad Ershad, former President of Bangladesh who belonged to an elite family of the Cooch Behar State
- Mir Jumla's invasion of Koch Bihar
