= Jagaddipendra Narayan =

Last ruling Maharaja of Cooch Behar from 1922–1949

Jagaddipendra Narayan I
- Maharaja of Cooch-Behar
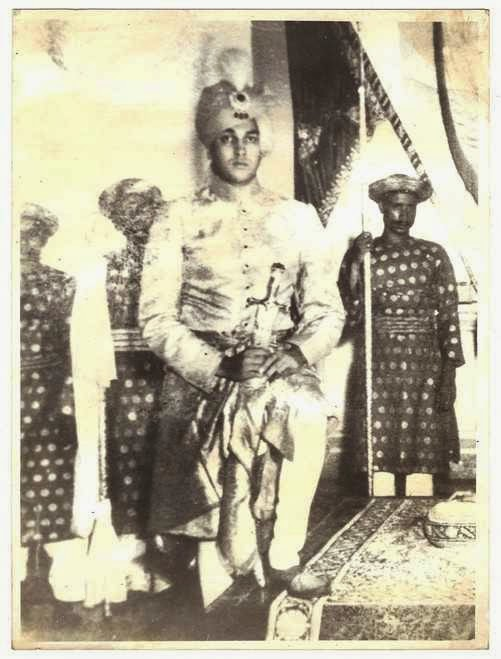

Maharaja (King) of Cooch-Behar
- Reign: 20 December 1922 – 12 September 1949
- Predecessor: Maharaja Jitendra Narayan I
- Successor: Monarchy abolished; Kingdom transformed into the District of Cooch Behar in the new State of West Bengal in the Republic of India
- Regent: Maharani Indira Revi
- Born: Crown Prince Jagaddipendra Narayan of Cooch Behar; 15 December 1915; Royal Palace, City of Cooch-Behar, Kingdom of Cooch-Behar (now State of West Bengal), Empire of India (now Republic of India)
- Died: 11 April 1970 (aged 54); Kolkata, West Bengal, India
- Spouse: Nancy Valentine (m. 1949; div. 1952) Georgina May Egan (m. 1956)
Regnal name
- Shri Jagaddipendra Narayan I Bhup Bahadur
- House: Cooch-Behar
- Father: Jitendra Narayan I of Cooch Behar
- Mother: Princess Indira Raje of Baroda

Jagaddipendra Narayan I of Cooch Behar, KCIE (15 December 1915 – 11 April 1970) was the last Maharaja (King) of the Kingdom of Cooch-Behar in Bengal, in the Empire of India, from September 1922 until September 1949. He served in the British forces during World War II and ceded full ruling powers to the Government of India in 1949.

== Early life ==
Jagaddipendra Narayan was born on 15 December 1915 at the Royal Palace of Cooch Behar in the Kingdom of Cooch-Behar, as the eldest child and first son of Maharaja Jitendra Narayan I and his Gujarati wife Maharani Indira Devi (sole surviving daughter of Sayajirao Gaekwad III of Baroda and Maharani Chimnabai (née Princess Princess Gajra Ghatge).)

He had an elder sister, Princess Ila Devi (1914-1956) and was followed by three younger siblings, Prince Indrajitendra Narayan (1918-1951), Princess Ayesha Devi (later Queen Gayatri Devi, Queen Consort of Jaipur) (1919-2009) and Princess Menaka Devi (later Queen Menaka Devi, Queen Consort of Dewas-Dewas) (1920). Within the family, he was informally known as 'Bhaiya' and was the brother of Gayatri Devi.

He was educated at St Cyprian's School, Eastbourne, Harrow and Trinity College, Cambridge, and also at the Prince of Wales Royal Indian Military College, Dehradun.

== Reign ==
He became the Maharaja of Cooch Behar at the age of seven on the death of his father on 20 December 1922 and ascended the gadi, on 24 December 1922. He reigned under the Regency of his mother until he came of age. He came of age and was invested with full ruling powers on 6 April 1936.

As maharaja he was a member of the Standing Committee of the Chamber of Princes (Narendra Mandal).

=== World War II ===
He served with the British Indian Army in World War II in North Africa, Assam, Burma, and South East Asia. He was present at the time of the Japanese surrender at Singapore in 1945. He was Chief Commandant Cooch Behar Military forces from 1943 to 1949, and Colonel-in-Chief 1st Cooch Behar Infantry and Rajendra Hazari Guards, Jaipur State Forces.

=== Post war ===
He signed the instrument of accession to the Dominion of India in August 1947 and ceded full ruling powers to the Government of India on 12 September 1949, overseeing the merger of his state with West Bengal on 1 January 1950.

While participating in a polo game at Jaipur in 1966 the horse he was riding on fell and rolled on him. His helmet came off, leading to brain damage and weeks in intensive care. He never fully recovered and was forced to spend the rest of his life confined to a wheelchair and needing constant medical attention. Narayan died of a heart attack in Calcutta at the age of 54 on 11 April 1970. Pg 149

As Narayan had no children he adopted his nephew Virajendra Narayan, the son of Indrajit Narayan and Kamala Devi as his heir.

== Personal life ==
In 1949 he privately married American actress Nancy Valentine at Cooch Behar. A daughter was born but did not survive and the couple separated in 1952.

While attending the opening night of a club in Mayfair he met Valerie Mewes who was a protégé of Stephen Ward and was immediately attracted to her. The next day Nayagan dined with her and Ward at the Les Ambassadeurs Club, a private club and casino in London. He afterwards purchased all the flowers in the shop at the Dorchester Hotel and sent them to Mewes. Within a month she had moved into an apartment in Upper Berkeley Street, paid for by the Maharaja. At his request she dyed her natural blond hair to black. On the evening of 16 July 1953 Narayan and Mewes were travelling in his Bentley from the Newmarket races back to London when it collided with a truck near Baldock in Hertfordshire. She received concussion and leg injuries while Narayan broke his collarbone and five ribs. Both were treated in Lister Hospital in Hitchin. At some point Narayan proposed marriage to her, knowing his formidable mother would be strongly opposed, as would the rest of his family and he ran the risk of losing his title and privy purse. Ward advised Mewes against accepting, as he felt that she would not like the restrictions imposed by palace life in India and that Narayan would end up blaming her if he lost the privy purse. Mewes turned down the proposal but the couple retained their close informal relationship.

In London on 16 September 1956 Narayan privately married model Georgina May Eganwho was 15 years his junior. Narayan kept the marriage secret from his mother as he was afraid of her reaction and it wasn’t until news of the marriage appeared on 6 August 1959 when the Daily Express published details of it while his mother was in Mumbai. She immediately fell ill. As soon as she well enough she asked that he annul the marriage. When Narayan refused and moved his new wife into the palace at Cooch Behan, his mother moved out, permanently.

After the marriage was made public Narayan's wife was recognised as Maharani together with the style of Her Highness in January 1960.

== Cricket ==
_
- Cricket career

Cricket information

Domestic team information
- Years: Team
- Bengal

Career statistics
Competition	FC
Matches	15
Runs scored	357
Batting average	16.22
100s/50s	0/1
Top score	71*
Balls bowled	677
Wickets	11
Bowling average
5 wickets in innings	0
10 wickets in match	0
Best bowling	4-42
Catches/stumpings	6/0

He was a keen cricketer and captained the Bengal Cricket XI.

== Honours ==
(ribbon bar, as it would look today, incomplete)

- King George V Silver Jubilee Medal – 1935
- King George VI Coronation Medal – 1937
- 1939–1945 Star – 1945
- Burma Star – 1945
- Africa Star – 1945
- Pacific Star – 1945
- War Medal 1939–1945 – 1945
- India Service Medal – 1945
- Knight Commander of the Order of the Indian Empire (KCIE) – 1947
- Indian Independence Medal – 1947
- Queen Elizabeth II Coronation Medal – 1953

== See also ==
Royal State Transport (Now "North Bengal State Transport Corporation")

North Bengal State Transport Corporation (NBSTC) is a West Bengal state government-undertaken transport corporation. It plys buses in North Bengal and other parts of West Bengal to Kolkata. NBSTC owns many depots in West Bengal to station their buses. This organisation was inaugurated by the then Maharaja of Cooch Behar His Highness Jagaddipendra Narayan Bhup Bahadur Lt.Col. on 1 April 1945. It started with three buses and trucks; initially operated "Royal Mail" service and slowly introduced its passenger version to Mansai Ghat, Burnish Ghat, Alipurduar, Tufangaunge etc. The vehicles were of 'Thames' and 'Chevrolet' make, later came 'Ford' models.Thanks to the far farsightedness of erstwhile rulers, this organisation provided and still providing livelihood and means of transport to people in North Bengal Region and lower Assam. It is most probably the oldest STU in India. NBSTC received a national productivity award in 1996.

- Koch dynasty

Maharaja Jagaddipendra Narayan I House of Cooch Behar Cadet branch of the Dynasty of Cooch Born: 15 December 1915 Died: 11 April 1970
Indian royalty
Regnal titles
Preceded by Maharaja Jitendra Narayan I	Maharaja (King) of Cooch Behar; 20 December 1922 – 12 September 1949	Monarchy abolished
Titles in pretence
Preceded by Himself as Monarch of the Kingdom of Cooch Behar	— TITULAR — Maharaja (King) of Cooch Behar; 12 September 1949 – 11 April 1970; Reason for succession failure: Kingdom of Cooch Behar merged into the State of West Bengal as the District of Cooch Behar	Succeeded by Maharaja Virajendra Narayan I
Political offices
Preceded by Maharani Indira Devi as Queen Regent of Cooch Behar	Head of State of Cooch Behar; 06 April 1936 – 12 September 1949	Kingom abolished Kingdom of Cooch Behar abolished and created as a Dsitrict in West Bengal; Bidhan Chandra Roy as Chief Minister of West Bengal
