= Gayatri Devi =

Maharani of Jaipur and Indian politician (1919–2009)

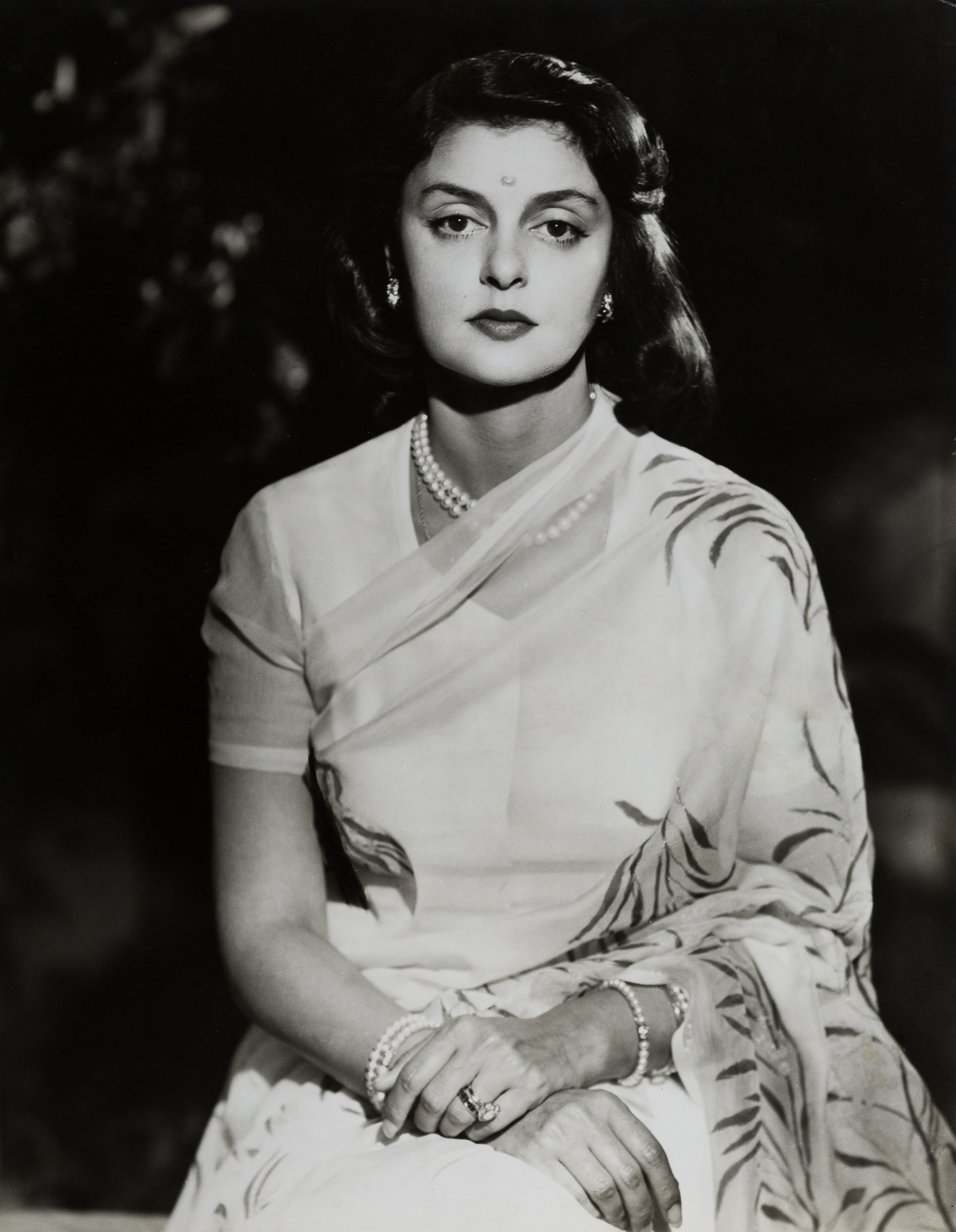
- Gayatri Devi in 1945

Member of Parliament, Lok Sabha
- In office 2 April 1962 – 15 March 1971
- Preceded by: Harish Chandra Sharma, IND
- Succeeded by: Satish Chandra Agarwal
- Constituency: Jaipur

Titular Maharani of Jaipur
- In office 1948 – 24 June 1970
- Succeeded by: Padmini Devi

Maharani of Jaipur
- In office 9 May 1940 – 1948

Personal details
- Born: 23 May 1919 London, England
- Died: 29 July 2009 (aged 90) Jaipur, Rajasthan, India
- Party: Swatantra Party (1962 – 1976) (Note: Gayatri Devi left active politics in 1976)
- Spouse: Man Singh II (m. 1940; died 1970)
- Children: Jagat Singh
- Parents: Maharaja Jitendra Narayan of Cooch-Behar (father); Princess Indira Raje of Baroda (mother)

Gayatri Devi (born Princess Gayatri Devi of Cooch Behar; 23 May 1919 − 29 July 2009) was the third Maharani consort of Jaipur from 1940 to 1949 through her marriage to Maharaja Sawai Man Singh II. Following her husband's signature for the Jaipur State to become part of the Union of India and her step-son's assumption of the title in 1970, she was known as Maharani Gayatri Devi, Rajmata of Jaipur.

She was born in the Hindu royal family of Cooch Behar. Her father was Maharaja Jitendra Narayan of Cooch Behar in West Bengal, and her mother was the Maratha Princess, Indira Raje of Baroda, the only daughter of Maharaja Sayajirao Gaekwad III, and she was sister to Jagaddipendra Narayan, informally known as 'Bhaiya', who succeeded their father to the throne of Cooch Behar.

Following India's independence and the abolition of the princely states, she became a successful politician in the Swatantra Party. Gayatri was also celebrated for her beauty and became something of a fashion icon in her adulthood. She served 12 years in Swatantra Party, during which she was a prominent critic of Indira Gandhi's government. After her departure from politics, she lived a quiet life in her large estate, spending time on hobbies and leisure.

She died on 29 July 2009 in Jaipur, at the age of 90. She was suffering from paralytic ileus and a lung infection. She left an estate estimated at £250 million, which was passed on to her grandchildren.

== Early life ==
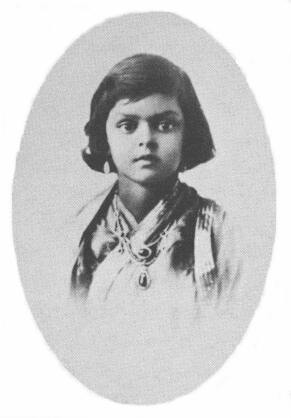
Gayatri Devi as a child

Born into a Hindu royal family, she had Bengali and royal Koch ancestry on her paternal side, while her maternal side was of royal Maratha descent. Her father, Prince Jitendra Narayan of the Cooch Behar State, presently in West Bengal, was the younger brother of the Yuvaraja (Crown Prince). She was related to Keshub Chandra Sen (A prominent figure in the Bengal Renaissance and social reformer) through her paternal grandmother, Suniti Devi, who was the daughter of Keshub Chandra Sen. Her mother was Maratha Princess Indira Raje of Baroda, the only daughter of Maratha King, Maharaja Sayajirao Gaekwad III, an extremely beautiful princess and a legendary socialite. Early in her life, her uncle's death led to her father ascending the throne (gaddi). Gayatri studied at Glendower Preparatory School in London, Patha Bhavana of Visva-Bharati University, Shantiniketan, and later in Lausanne, Switzerland, where she travelled with her mother and siblings, then studied secretarial skills in London School of Secretaries; Brillantmont and Monkey Club London.

She first met Sawai Man Singh II when she was 12 and he had come to Calcutta to play polo and stayed with their family. She married Sawai Man Singh II Bahadur on 9 May 1940.

Gayatri was a particularly avid equestrienne. She was an excellent rider and an able Polo player. She was a good shot and enjoyed many days out on 'Shikars'. Gayatri was fond of cars and is credited with importing the first Mercedes-Benz W126, a 500 SEL to India which was later shipped to Malaysia. She also owned several Rolls-Royces and an aircraft. Gayatri had one child, Prince Jagat Singh of Jaipur, late Raja of Isarda, born on 15 October 1949, who was granted his uncle's fief as a subsidiary title. Jagat Singh was the half-brother to Bhawani Singh, who was the eldest son of his father born by his father's first wife.

As a style icon, Gayatri was shot by photographer Cecil Beaton for Vogue. Gayatri was described by Beaton as one of the ten most beautiful women in the world. In a 2004 interview, Gayatri mentioned "I have never felt beautiful...I remember as a young girl, my mother had to literally force me into applying lipstick, physical appearance doesn't bother me, it never has, it never will". In 1962 Jacqueline Kennedy visited Gayatri Devi in India and were photographed together at a Polo match and on her tour of India. In 2019 an exhibition 'Maharani: ‘Remembering the Princess'" was held in Mumbai to celebrate the Maharani's Centennial year. In 2013 designer Sabyasachi made five limited edition saris presented at the Taj Mahal Palace in honour of Devi's enduring style icon status.

She started two schools in Jaipur, Maharani Gayatri Devi Girls’ Public School established in 1943 and Maharaja Sawai Man Singh Vidyalaya, Jaipur which is a co-educational school in memory of her husband. She revived and promoted the dying art of blue pottery.

== Political career ==
Gayatri Devi ran for Parliament in 1962 and won from Jaipur Lok Sabha constituency, winning 192,909 votes out of 246,516 cast. She continued to hold this seat in 1967 and 1971 as a member of the Swatantra Party founded by C. Rajagopalachari, running against the Indian National Congress.

In 1965, during a meeting with Prime Minister Lal Bahadur Shastri, Gayatri was again asked to join Congress. Despite the fact that her husband was being made ambassador to Spain, she stuck to her principles and decided not to join the party. In 1967 the Swatantra party joined hands with Jan Sangh that was led by Bhairon Singh Shekhawat. The alliance won a large number of seats in the 1967 election. In the assembly election Gayatri lost to Damodar Lal Vyas, in Malpura constituency, but won the Lok Sabha election.

The privy purses were abolished in 1971, terminating all royal privileges and titles. Gayatri was arrested under the COFEPOSA Act during the Emergency in July 1975 on the accusation of violating tax laws, and served 5 and a half months in Tihar Jail. She retired from politics and published her biography, A Princess Remembers, written by Santha Rama Rau, in 1976. It was also published in Marathi language as A Princess Remembers: Gayatri Devi. She was also the focus of the film Memoirs of a Hindu Princess, directed by Françoise Levie.

There were rumours that she might re-enter politics as late as 1999, when the Cooch Behar Trinamool Congress nominated her as their candidate for the Lok Sabha elections, but she did not respond to the offer.

== Family ==
Gayatri Devi had one son, Prince Jagat Singh, Raja of Isarda (15 October 1949 – 5 February 1997), who was granted his paternal uncle's (father's elder brother) fief of Isarda as a subsidiary title. Jagat Singh was married on 10 May 1978 to Mom Rajawongse Priyanandana Rangsit (b. 1952), daughter of Prince Piyarangsit Rangsit and Princess Vibhavadi Rangsit (née Rajani) of Thailand. The couple had two children:

- Rajkumari Lalitya Kumari (b. 1979)
- Maharaj Devraj Singh, Raja of Isarda (b. 1981)

Today, they are her only surviving descendants, and as such, have claimed to be heirs of their paternal grandmother.

Maharaj Jagat Singh was paternal half-brother to Bhawani Singh of Jaipur, the eldest son of the late Maharaja by his first wife, a Jodhpur princess.

=== Family relationships ===
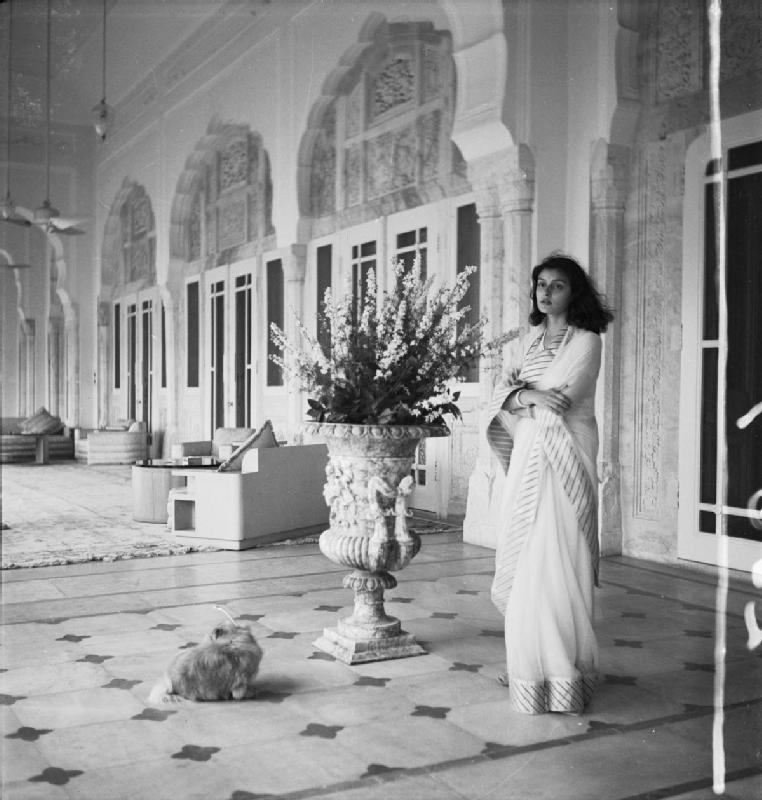
Gayatri Devi, photographed by Cecil Beaton in 1940.

Gayatri Devi was related to several erstwhile royal families in India. She was herself not from the Rajput community, but from a dynasty native to Cooch Behar in Bengal, and was daughter of Maharaja Jitendra Narayan and Maharani Indira Raje, who was daughter of Maharaja Sayajirao Gaekwad III and Maharani Chimnabai, belonging to the Gaekwad dynasty of the Marathas.

Her paternal grandparents were Nripendra Narayan Bhup Bahadur and Sunity Devi of Cooch Behar. Maharani Sunity Devi was the daughter of the Brahmo social reformer Keshab Chandra Sen.

She had two brothers, Jagaddipendra Narayan and Indrajitendra Narayan of whom Jagaddipendra Narayan became the Maharaja of Cooch Behar in his infancy after the death of their father in 1922.

Thus, maternally, she was closely connected to Gaekwads of Baroda State. Further, her sister Ila Devi was married into the Tripura royal family, and her younger sister, Maneka Devi, was married into the royal family of Dewas State. Thus, through various relatives, she was related to the royal houses of Kota, Sawantwadi, Akkalkot State, Jath State, Dewas Jr., Jasdan State, Sandur, Tehri-Garhwal, Mayurbhanj, Dhar State, Kolhapur, Lunawada State, Baria and Raja of Payagpur, which was considered normal among the royalties of India.

== Death ==
She was admitted at Santokba Durlabhji Memorial hospital (SDMH) on 17 July 2009. She died at the age of 90 on 29 July 2009, reportedly due to lung failure.

Her family has approached the Delhi High Court to regain 800 kg of gold which was taken away by the government in 1975 describing possession of the gold by Gayatri Devi to be illegal as per the Gold Control Act, 1968. In 2012, the central government counsel S.K. Dubey told the court the possession of raw gold by Gayatri Devi was illegal. Dubey added, "The family has violated both the rules, so a fine of Rs.1.5 crore was imposed on them by the government. It was later reduced to Rs.80 lakh."

== Filmography ==
- Stephane Bern. Gayatra Devi, une princesse au pays des Maharajas. Documentary by Roland Portiche and Vanessa Pontet. 1h45'. 2013. First broadcast on 26 December 2013, FR2 (French TV).

== Additional sources ==
- Devi, Gayatri (1977). A Princess Remembers: The Memoirs of the Maharani of Jaipur. J.B. Lippincott. ISBN 81-7167-307-4.
- Kanwar, Dharmendar (2005) [2004]. Rajmata Gayatri Devi. Roli Books. ISBN 9-788-174-36294-0.
- Devi, Gayatri (1999). Gourmet's Gateway: A Royal Collection. Dharmendar Kanwar. ISBN 81-901221-0-X.
- Moore, Lucy (2005). Maharanis. Penguin Books. ISBN 978-0-14-303704-0.
- Kanwar, Dharmendar (2004). Rajmata Gayatri Devi--: Enduring Grace. Lustre Press, Roli Books. ISBN 978-81-7436-295-7.
- Stern, Robert W. (1988). The Cat and the Lion: Jaipur State in the British Raj. BRILL. ISBN 978-90-04-08283-0.
