= Valerie Mewes =

English model and celebrity

- Born: 2 August 1931; Staines-upon-Thames, Middlesex, England
- Died: 9 January 1955 (aged 23); Hurley, Berkshire, England
- Other name: Vicki Martin
- Occupation: Model

Valerie Mewes (2 August 1931 – 9 January 1955) was an English model and celebrity, better known by the name Vicki Martin.

== Biography ==
Valerie Mewes was born on 2 August 1931 in Staines-upon-Thames, Middlesex, England to Margaret Alice (nee Reynolds) and John Pembroke Mewes. She attended Ashford County Grammar School. She had a younger sister Doreen who was born in 1932 and a half-sister Vivienne Warren born in 1945 from her mother’s second marriage. Vivienne Warren married George Harrison Marks, a photographer.

At the age of 17, Mewes ran away to London.

She ended up working as a hostess at the Court Club, on Duke Street in upmarket Mayfair, owned by the underworld figure Morris Conley. While there she became best friends with Ruth Ellis another of the club’s hostesses, the last woman executed in the United Kingdom. Mewes and Ellis rented an apartment together in south London. It was during this period that she meet Stephen Ward, who was to become one of the central figures in the 1963 Profumo affair. Ward claimed to have met Mewes in a doorway in Oxford Street during a thunderstorm at night. Taking her under his wing Ward took her back to his flat, dressed her in clothes left behind by his ex-wife and for approximately a year she stayed there with him as he improved her walk and smoothed her Cockney accent, to assist her desire to be model. At his suggestion she changed her name to Vicki Martin. Ward produced many female protégés, including Christine Keeler, and it is said that Mewes was the prototype for these. He introduced her to Mayfair society at the opening night of a club, managed by his friend Siegi Sessler. Also attending the event was Jagaddipendra Narayan, the Maharaja of Cooch Behar who was immediately attracted to her, as was Mewes to him. The next day she dined with him and Ward at the Les Ambassadeurs Club, a private club and casino in London. The Maharaja, 16 years her senior, afterwards bought all the flowers in the shop at the Dorchester Hotel and sent them to Mewes. Within a month she had moved into an apartment in Upper Berkeley Street, paid for by the Maharaja. At his request she dyed her natural blond hair, black.

At this time, Ward arranged for Mewes to appear in the 1952 film It Started in Paradise, playing the part of a model. The actress, Kay Kendall, who was a friend of Ward's, also appeared in the film. This appearance led to her receiving invitations to high-society events, where she attracted the attention of numerous affluent men, playboys and showmen.

On the evening of 16 July 1953 she was travelling with Narayan in his Bentley from the Newmarket races back to London when it collided with a truck near Baldock in Hertfordshire. She received concussion and leg injuries while Narayan broke his collarbone and five ribs. Both were treated in Lister Hospital in Hitchin. It was while recovering that Narayan proposed marriage to her, knowing his formidable mother would be strongly opposed, as would the rest of his family. He also ran the risk of losing his title and privy purse. Ward advised Mewes against accepting, as he felt that she would not like the restrictions imposed by palace life in India and that Narayan would end up blaming her if he lost the privy purse. Mewes turned down the proposal but the couple retained their close informal relationship. He commissioned artist Vasco Lazzolo to paint her portrait, but she never attended her final sitting due to her death.

== Death ==
She was in a car travelling back to London from an all-night party at a club in Maidenhead to keep an early photo call when it was involved in a collision with another car on Henley Road near Hurley at 4 am on 9 January 1955. Mewes was killed, dying of massive injuries while on the way to hospital while the other occupant of the car, writer Terence Robertson survived. Robertson was the author of a number of books, including 'The Golden Horseshoe'. Robertson took his own life in January 1970. The wrecked cars were found by Sir David Salt, of Cookham Berkshire. There was some confusion as to who was driving the car, with The Times and Daily Mirror stating that Mewes was the driver while others stated Robertson was the driver. At the inquest numerous friends of Mewes claimed that she could not drive. The driver of other car, David Salisbury Haig was killed while his wife of six weeks survived. Both survivors had facial injuries and initially treated at Maidenhead Hospital before being taken to Mount Vernon Hospital. At the time of her death Mewes was living at 75 Cadogan Place, in Belgravia, London. Mewes left over £2000 in her will.

Mewes’s funeral was on 14 January 1955. Narayan was informed of Mewes death by reporters while in India and was too distraught to attend. As a result his brother-in-law the Maharaja of Jaipur attended the funeral on his behalf.

== In popular culture ==
Vicki Martin was a character in Amanda Whittington’s play The Thrill of Love about Ruth Ellis which was commissioned by the New Vic Theatre, Newcastle-under-Lyme in 2013.
