= National Council of Women in India =

Women's organization in India

The National Council of Women in India (NCWI) is a women's organization in India, founded in 1925.

It was the second of the first three major feminist organizations in India, alongside Women's Indian Association (WIA) and All-India Women's Conference (AIWC), and India's first representative in the International Council of Women (ICW) as the predecessor of the AIWC.

The NCWI was founded by Lady Aberdeen of the ICW and Lady Meherbai Tata (wife of Dorabji Tata), as the Indian representative of the ICW. Having visited Europe, Lady Tata became convinced that India needed women to organize in a women's movement the same way as European women. NCWI was founded by a merge of several local women's organizations such as the Bombay Presidency Women's Council (BPWC), the Calcutta Women's League of Service, and the Women's Council of Delhi, Bihar and Orissa.

NCWI formed permanent committees within subjects such as Arts, work, media and law and, through its local branches, placed a representative and advisory in the local city boards of schools, libraries, refugee homes, shelters, prisons and other government institutions. Through its law committee, it also promoted women's issues through a petition policy.

The membership fee of the NCWI was very high, which in practice made the NCWI an organization for the upper class elite. It consisted of upper-class women from the British influenced Indian elite loyal to the colonial government of British India. Indian upper-class women having, at this time, only recently left the traditional Purdah seclusion, acted to engage in public life in the way British women did, and as their husbands, they remained loyal to the Status quo and did not involve themselves or the NCWI in the issue of Indian independence. The elite character of the NCWI in combination with its loyalty to the British Raj resulted in its failing to make the organization a national mass movement, a goal that was instead reached by the AIWC.

Due to the NCWI having members consisting of the wives to elite men with contacts to the establishment, they were often efficient in reaching results, and did so in many of the issues they engaged in. However, the issues they engaged in was often modest, due to their loyalty to the establishment. The NCWI was locally successful in many issues regarding the improvement in women's working conditions, maternity care, ensuring women's spaces within prisons and shelters, as well as promoting the Prostitution Act in Bombay and the Sarada Act. The NCWI also belonged to the organisation who supported the women's suffrage reform, which was introduced by the British in 1935.

Among the patrons where Sultan Jahan Begum and Lady Dorab Tata, Maharani Maharani Chimnabai Saheb of Baroda, and among its regular members were Cornelia Sorabji and Sucharu Devi. The President of the NCWI was Maharani Chimnabai in 1925-1937 and Sethu Parvathi Bayi in 1938–1944.

The NCWI published its own paper: the NCWI Bulletin.
