= Indira Devi of Cooch Behar =

Maharani of British Indian Cooch Behar

Indira Devi
- Maharani of Cooch Behar
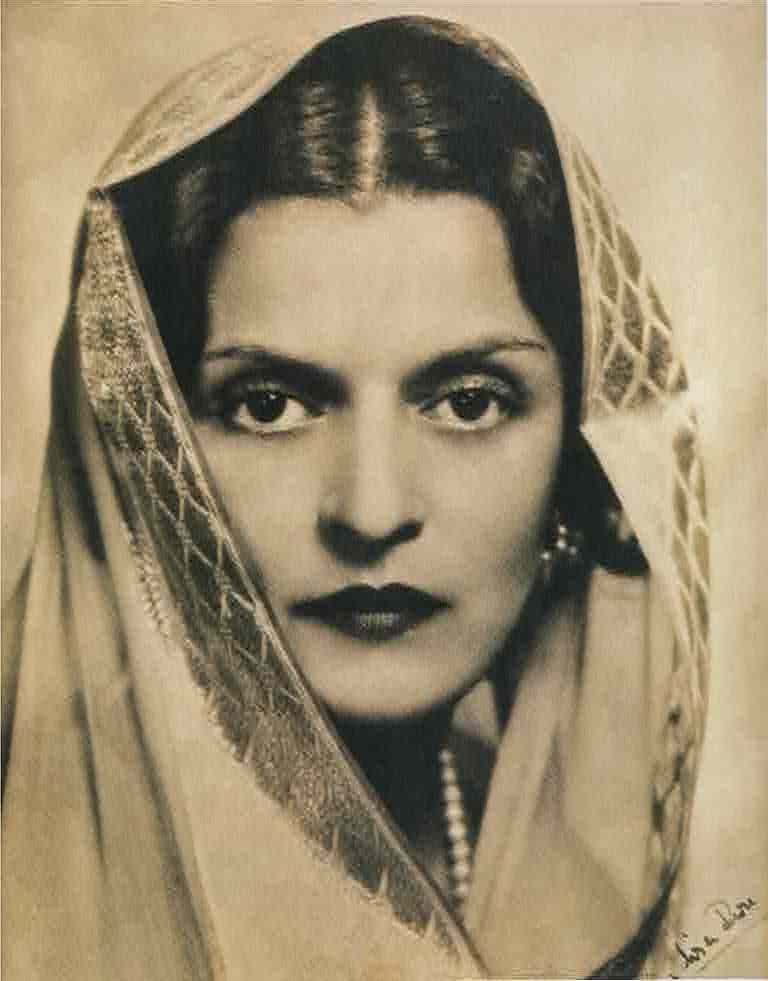
- Indira Devi in 1935

Queen Consort of Cooch Behar
- Tenure: 1 September 1913 – 20 December 1922

Queen Regent of Cooch Behar
- Regency: 20 December 1922 – 6 April 1936
- Monarch: King Jagaddipendra I Narayan
- Born: 19 February 1892; Vadodara, Kingdom of Baroda, Empire of India
- Died: 6 September 1968 (aged 76); Bombay, India
- Spouse: Jitendra I Narayan of Cooch-Behar (m. 1913; died 1922)
- Issue: Princess Ila Devi; Jagaddipendra I Narayan of Cooch-Behar; Prince Indrajitendra Narayan; Queen Gayatri Devi, Queen Consort of Jaipur; Queen Menaka Devi, Queen Consort of Dewas
- House: Gaekwad (by birth) Koch (by marriage)
- Father: Sayajirao Gaekwad III of Baroda
- Mother: Princess Gajra Ghatge
- Religion: Hinduism

Indira Devi (born as Indira Raje; 19 February 1892 – 6 September 1968) was the Maharani of the princely state of Cooch Behar, British India. She was born a princess of Baroda as the daughter of Maharaja Sayajirao Gaekwad III, by his second wife Chimnabai II.

She broke her arranged engagement to marry Jitendra Narayan and became daughter-in-law to Suniti Devi. Previously her engagement had been fixed to Madho Rao Scindia, Maharaja of Gwalior.

Following the death of her husband she became regent of Cooch Behar in 1922-1936 during the minority of her elder son Jagaddipendra Narayan. Her fourth child and second daughter, Princess Gayatri Devi, would later go on to become the Maharani of Jaipur.

== In Baroda ==
Indira was born the only daughter of Sayajirao Gaekwad III of Baroda and his second wife Maharani Chimnabai (1872–1958). She grew up with her several brothers at the opulent Lakshmi Vilas Palace in Baroda, and was betrothed at a young age to Madho Rao Scindia, the then Maharaja of Gwalior. During the period of engagement, Indira attended the Delhi durbar of 1911, where she met Jitendra, younger brother of the then Maharaja of Cooch Behar. Within days, they were in love and had decided to marry.

=== "The Letter that broke the engagement" ===
Indira knew that her parents would be aghast; many issues were involved: the diplomatic repercussions of breaking a standing engagement with the Scindia ruler of Gwalior, one of the premier 21-gun-salute princes of India; the scandal and universal opprobrium that would certainly ensue; also the fact that Jitendra was the younger son and thus unlikely ever to become king.

Indira circumvented her parents by taking the initiative in breaking her engagement herself, a daring act for an 18-year-old Indian maiden of that era. She wrote to her fiancé saying that she did not wish to marry him. In Baroda, Indira's father received a single-sentence telegram from the Maharaja of Gwalior: "What does the princess mean by her letter?" This was the first inkling her stunned parents had of Indira's intentions. The Maharaja behaved in exemplary fashion, writing an understanding letter to Indira's father which he signed off as "your son"; however, the disgrace was great and was felt keenly by Indira's parents.

=== Wedding ===
The breaking of the engagement was accomplished, but this defiance of her parents did not serve to reconcile them to her marrying Jitendra. Indira's parents apparently regarded Jitendra as a playboy from a feckless family; they even ventured to summon him and give him a personal warning to stay away. Nothing worked; Indira and Jitendra were equally adamant. Eventually, perhaps also in recognition of the fact that respectable alliances for Indira were now unlikely, her parents made a half-way compromise. They allowed Indira to leave their roof, proceed to London and wed Jitendra.

Indira and Jitendra were wed at a hotel in London with no member of Indira's family present. They were wed by the rites of the Brahmo Samaj, the sect to which Jitendra's mother, Suniti Devi, daughter of Keshub Chunder Sen, adhered.

== In Cooch Behar ==
It happened that at the time of the wedding, Jitendra's elder brother, Rajendra Narayan, the Maharaja of Cooch Behar, was grievously ill. Within days of the wedding, he died of ailments arising from alcohol abuse, and Jitendra became maharaja of Cooch Behar. The couple lived a relatively happy life and rapidly became the parents of five children. However, alcoholism was endemic in Jitendra's family, and he died at a young age, within a decade of the wedding.

Indira was now not only a young widow and the mother of five, but also regent of Cooch Behar during the minority of her elder son. She faced her situation not merely with courage but indeed with verve. Her administrative skills were deemed by observers very mediocre, but Indira quickly gained a reputation for her highly-active social life, and spent prolonged periods of time in Europe and away from Cooch Behar. She was not known to remain chaste in widowhood, being variously linked to Hugh Molyneux, 7th Earl of Sefton, Sir C.P. Ramaswami Iyer, Prince George, Duke of Kent, and even the future Edward VIII - with the princely dalliances ultimately the likely source of the cryptic message George V sent via the India Office, in effect asking her to leave Europe and return to Cooch Behar.

=== Children ===
Indira was the mother of three daughters and two sons.

1. Indira's eldest daughter, Ila, married a prince of Tripura, Ramendra Kishore Dev Varma. Her younger son Bharat Dev Varma took for wife the actress Moon Moon Sen; they are the parents of Indian actors Raima and Riya.
2. Her elder son, Jagaddipendra Narayan, succeeded his father as Maharaja of Cooch Behar, and was the last ruling prince of his dynasty; Cooch Behar was merged with the Dominion of India (later the Republic of India) during his reign. He had no legitimate children, and was succeeded by his nephew Virajendra.
3. The second son, Indrajitendra, married a daughter of the Maharaja of Pithapuram estate in present-day Andhra Pradesh. They were the parents of Virajendra and also of Uttara Devi, Maharani of Kotah in Rajasthan.
4. Indira's second daughter, Gayatri, became the third wife of the Maharaja of Jaipur, and was a noted celebrity in her own right.
5. Indira's youngest daughter Menaka married the Maharaja of Dewas Jr in central India.

== Later life ==
Indira's elder son assumed full powers as ruler of Cooch Behar in 1936. Indira thereafter spent a major portion of her time in Europe. Indira Devi faced many tragedies in her lifetime. Indira Devi lost two of her children: Princess Ila Devi who died at a very young age and Prince Indrajit Narayan Bhup, who died in an accidental fire leaving behind his wife Princess Kamala of Pithapuram. Maharani Indira Devi spent the last years of her life in Mumbai and died there in September 1968.

== Gallery ==
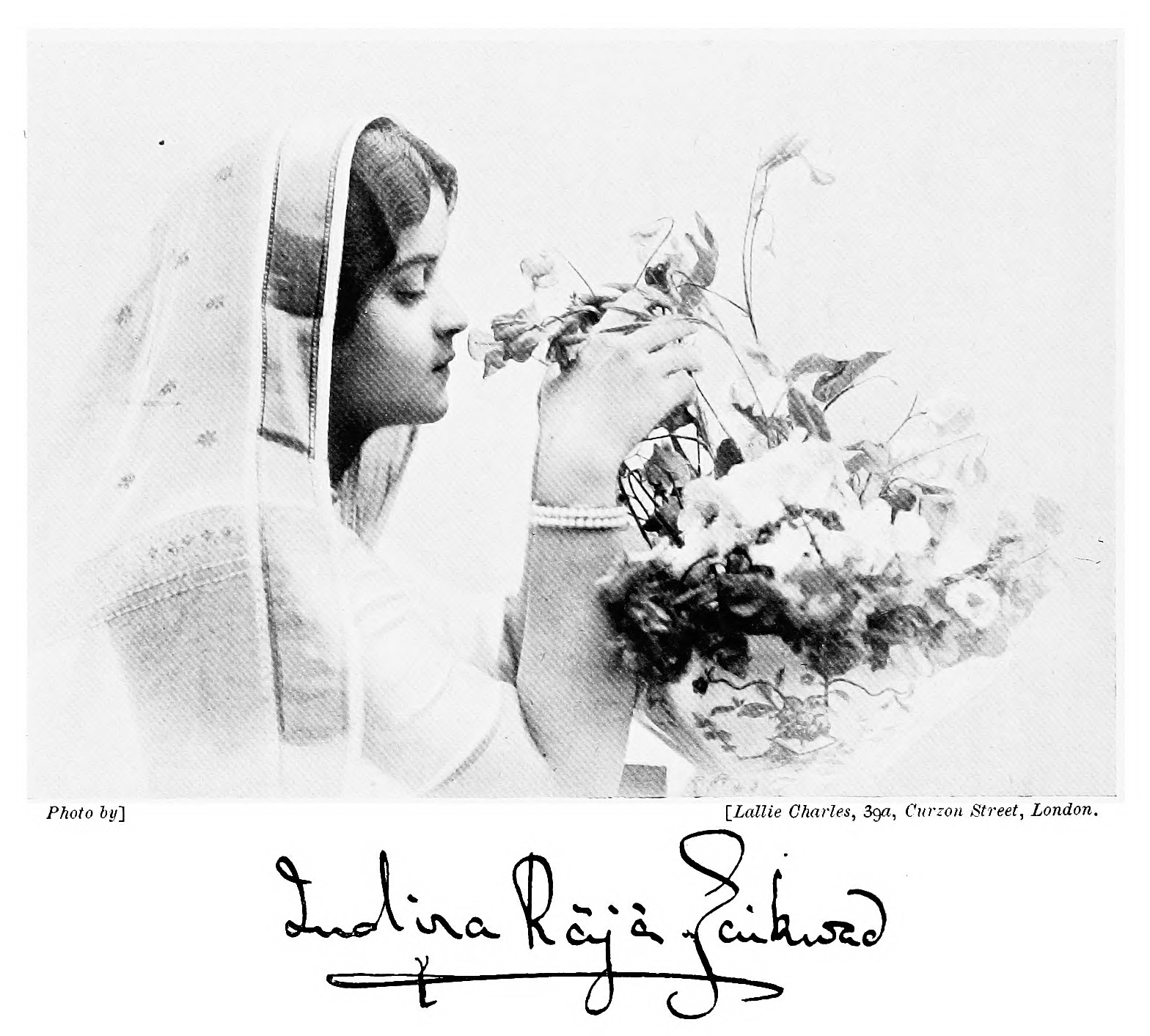
Indira Raje Gaikwad by Lallie Charles (1911)

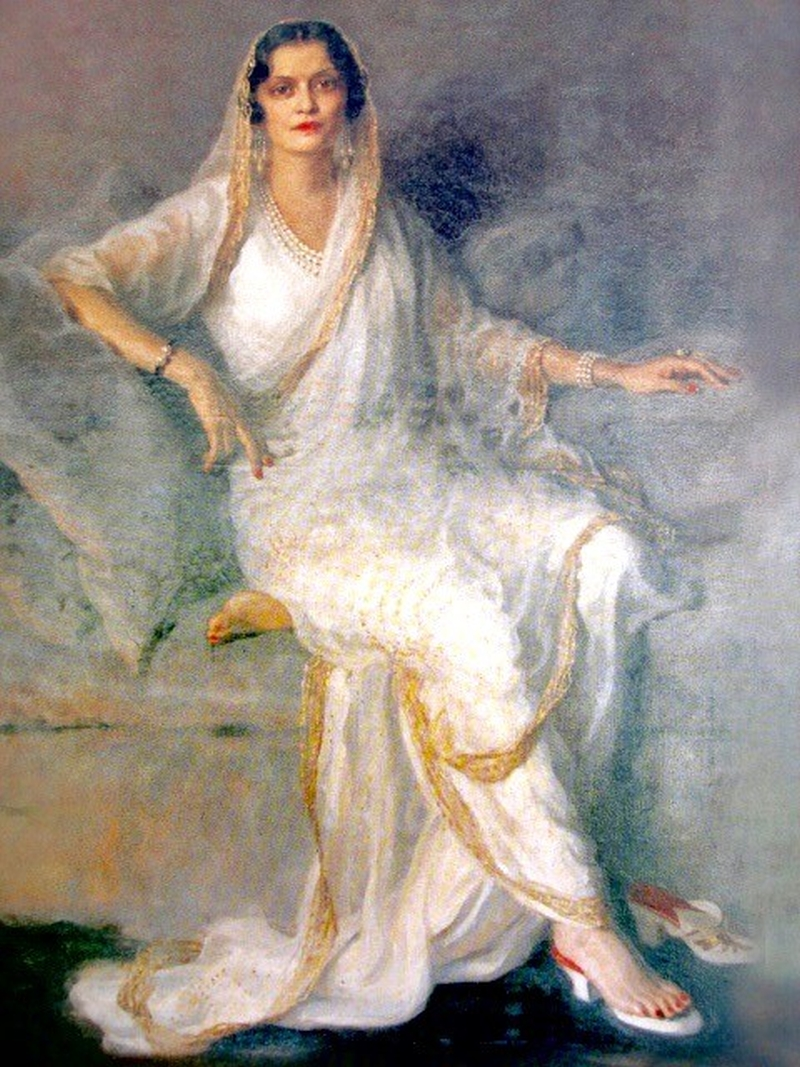
Devi by Philip Alexius de László

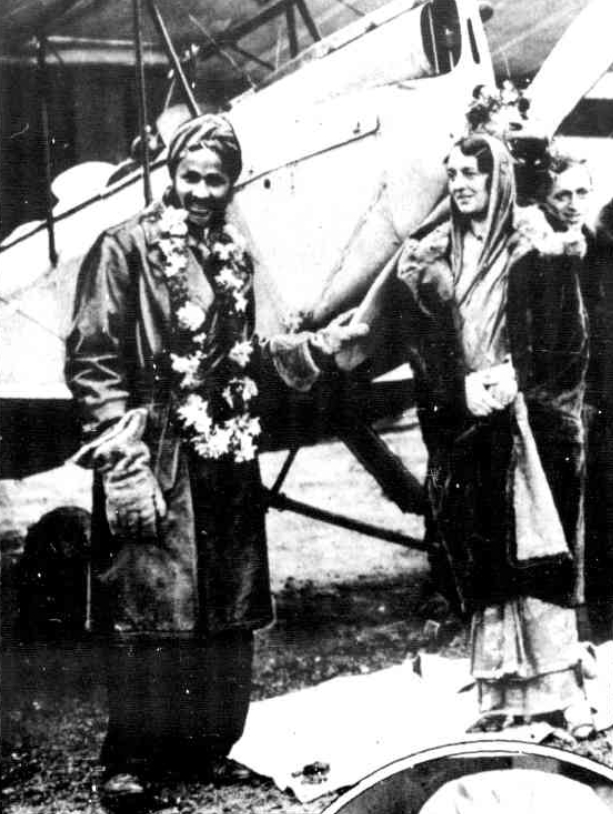
Devi with Manmohan Singh, London (1930)

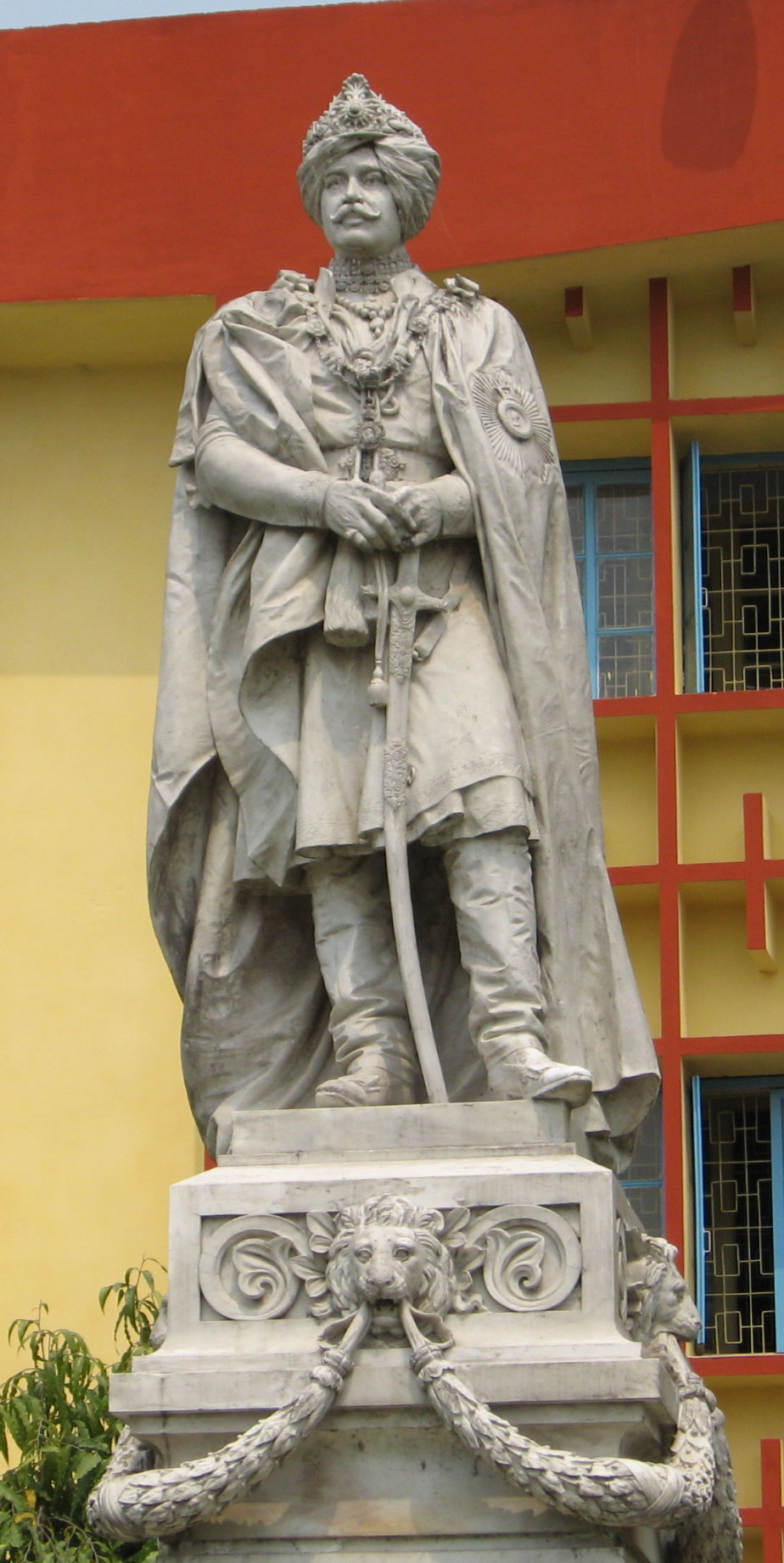
Jagaddipendra Narayan

== Bibliography ==
- Moore, Lucy (2004) Maharanis: the lives and times of three generations of Indian princesses. London: Viking ISBN 0-670-91287-5
- Weeden, Edward St Clair (1911). A year with the Gaekwar of Baroda. Boston : D. Estes & Co.
- Williams, Elaine (2003). Maharani: Memoirs of a rebellious princess. Brinda, Maharani of Kapurthala. New Delhi: Rupa & Co. ISBN 0-595-09428-7.

Maharani Indira Devi House of Gaekwad Born: 19 February 1892 Died: 06 September 1968
Indian royalty
Royal titles
Preceded by Suniti Sen	Maharani (Queen) Consort of Cooch Behar; 01 September 1913 – 20 December 1922	Vacant Monarchy abolished Title next held by Georgina Egan as Titular
Other offices
New office Regency of Maharaja Jagaddipendra Narayan I established	Maharani Regent of Cooch Behar; 20 December 1922 – 06 April 1936	Regency Complete
