= Baikunthapur Forest =

Terai forest region in Dooars, West Bengal, India

Coordinates: 26.780°N 88.515°E

Location of Baikunthapur Forest in West Bengal.

Baikunthapur is a Terai forest region in the western part of the Dooars in West Bengal, India, south of the Himalayan foothills, between the Mahananda River to the west and Teesta River to the east. The main towns in the area are Siliguri and Jalpaiguri. The forests are partly in the Darjeeling district and partly in the Jalpaiguri district.

Baikunthapur is an important ecological zone, home to many wild elephants, but is threatened by growth of the local population. The least disturbed areas are in the Mahananda Wildlife Sanctuary.

Historically, the Baikunthapur forests were the secure base of the Raikat princes in the time when Koch Bihar was an independent kingdom.

== Geology and climate ==
The northern part of West Bengal is covered by fans of sediment washed down from the Himalayas. The Baikanthapur formation is the youngest fan in the area. It consists of very fine white sand inter-layered with ochre yellow sticky silty clay and overlain by dark grey to thick silty loam. The Shangaon formation represents the deposits of the flood plain faces of the Baikunthapur formation. Measurements have shown a maximum arsenic content well beyond the permissible limit (0.05 mg/L, Indian standard) within a depth range of 10–30m, in the Shaugaon surface. This raises concerns about the possibility of arsenic poisoning in the region and in downstream locations.

There are three main seasons: summer, monsoons and winter. The summer season extends from the first week of March to the second week of June, with April being the hottest month. Summer temperatures range in the mid-30s C. The monsoons (June and September) bring severe rain. 125 mm or more may fall in 24 hours, bringing all activity to halt and often causing local floods and landslides. Annual rainfall may exceed 250 cm. Winters (September–February) can be chilly, with cold winds from the Himalayas. Temperatures may fall as low as 5 °C during this period.

The land use pattern has changed dramatically since discovery of the potential for growing tea and reduction of the incidence of malaria. At one time, the area was one of dense forests, lakes and marshes laced with constantly shifting rivers. In the last fifty years, a huge influx of people have drastically changed the environment. Today, the area is just 25% forest, 15% tea garden, 43% cultivated and non-cultivated land and 17% water bodies, residential, hill etc.

Click on the coordinates at the top of this page. Select a satellite view with no labels. Pan back for broader and broader views until the channels of the Brahmaputra are visible at the foot of the image. Along the line between the mountains and the plain there are patches of dark green - the remaining Terai forests. One hundred years ago, there would have been a continuous and much wider band of dark green. Forests like the Baikanthapur with all their diversity of life and value in moderating water flow continue to be eroded by the growing human population.

== History ==
It is believed that Lord Krishna went into hiding in the jungles of Baikunthapur with his principal wife and queen Rukmini at one time. For this reason, ISKCON chose nearby Siliguri as the site for the biggest Krishna Centre in the Northeast.

The Raikat family were local rulers in the Baikunthapur area between 1523 and 1771, semi-independent rulers related to the Koch dynasty of the Kamata kingdom. The Raikat capital was at Siliguri, then deep within impenetrable forests between the rivers Mahananda to the west and Teesta to the west. During the 1680s, when the Bhutias were trying to take control of Koch Bihar, the Raikats intervened and tried to establish their own candidate for the throne. After a confused struggle, the Raikats withdrew and accepted the authority of the Fauzdar of Ghoraghat, perhaps only nominally.

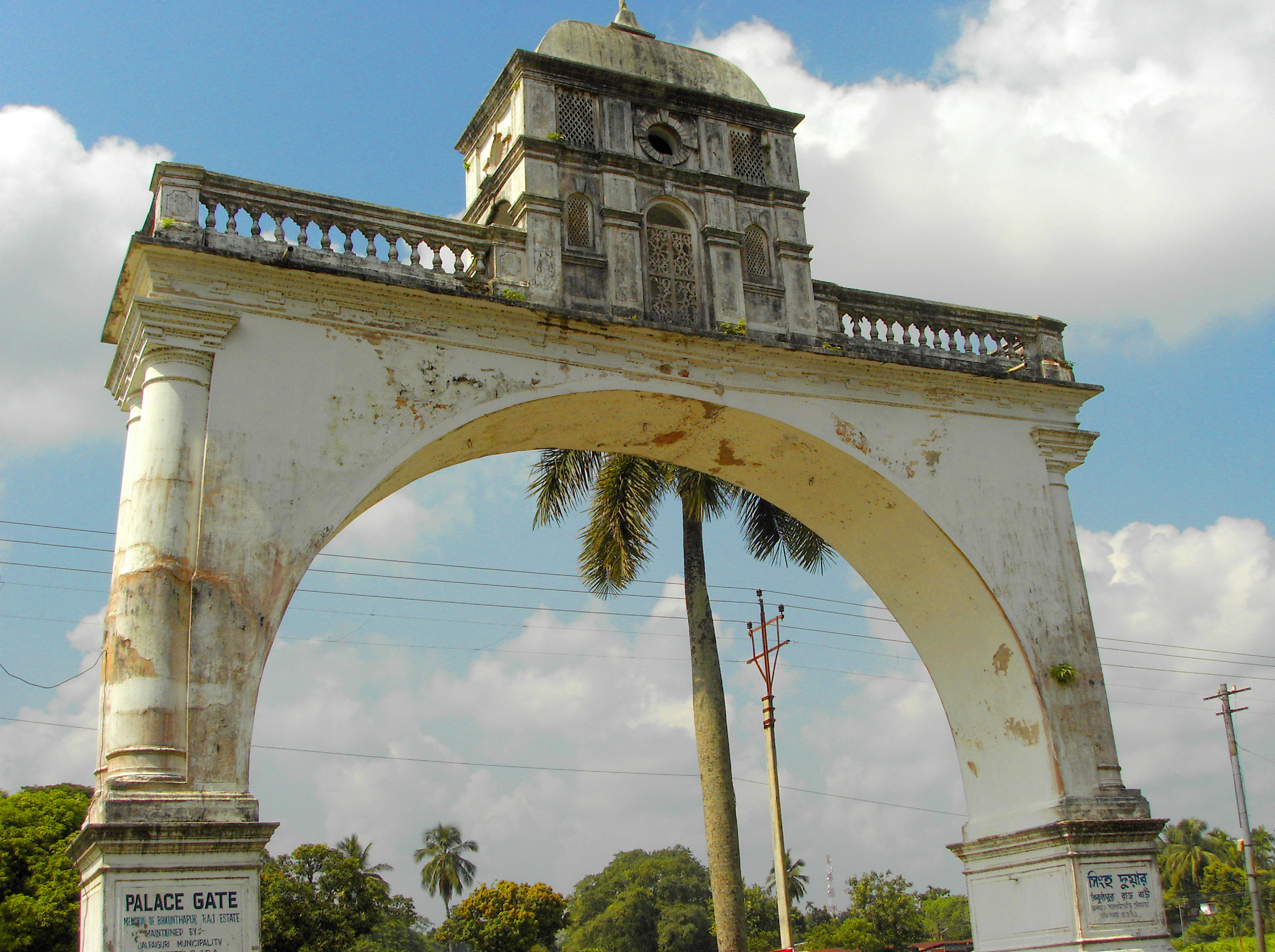
Jalpaiguri Rajbari (Palace) Gate

The Raikats moved their capital south to Jalpaiguri around 1720. The Faujdar of Rangpur pressured the Raikats to accept the suzerainty of the Nawab of Bengal sometime between 1736 and 1739, but the Faujdar had to invade the territory in 1756 to enforce the claim. The Raikats still paid only partial tribute. In 1771 the British annexed Baikanthapur and the Raikats became Zamindars (tenants) of Baikunthapur, but remained largely independent. As late as 1839, the British government in India complained that the Raikat had taken possession of the western Duars of Bhutan.

In the 1850s commercial exploitation of Darjeeling tea began in the area. The British Raj assumed increasing control under their system of district commissioners, succeeded by the state of India in 1947.

The last Raikat of Baikunthapur, died intestate in 1946. The family home is still occupied, but is suffering from disrepair. However, the crumbling Rajbari (palace) in Jalpaiguri is a popular sightseeing spot for tourists and locals. The palace grounds hold the large palace building, its portico, a bushy garden, and two temples. The gate is a huge unreinforced concrete arch structure. There are several lakes in the Palace ground, one maintained by the government.

== Environmental degradation ==
The Baikunthapur forests have shrunk considerably. They have always been vulnerable to shifts in river courses, but the swampy wet land helps the natural forest to regrow. However, recent deforestation of a huge area is causing ecological imbalances, and also changing weather conditions. Land clearing, terracing, mining and construction are all contributing to soil erosion and degraded water quality.

Joint Forest Management activities started in the Baikunthapur area in 1994-95. The efforts have not been fully effective, perhaps because the Forest Department has not sufficiently involved the local population or explained the purpose of the program. Natural forests in the Baikunthapur and Jalpaiguri Forest Divisions, where more than 30% of forest area is under the Joint Forest Management, are being ruined by illegal and destructive felling and uncontrolled grazing. Production of agricultural residue for use as household fuel is negligible. Forests serve as the main source of fuelwood for local people in Jalpaiguri, Baikunthapur, Cooch Bihar (Wildlife) and Darjeeling Forest Divisions. According to a study carried out by the Indian Institute of Forest Management, 93% of households collect wood for fuel from forests in the Baikunthapur area. The quantity of wood extracted does not appear to be sustainable.

Each year, teams from the Baikunthapur forest division seize illegal consignments of lumber worth lakhs of rupees from the Mahananda Wildlife Sanctuary and the adjacent Baikunthapur Forest Reserve in West Bengal. However, far more wood is sold than seized. Again, some argue that this is because the land tenure system does not encourage proper stewardship by the local inhabitants. In the past, there have been abuses by the army and officials. But the overwhelming factor has been explosive population growth.

== Elephant issues ==
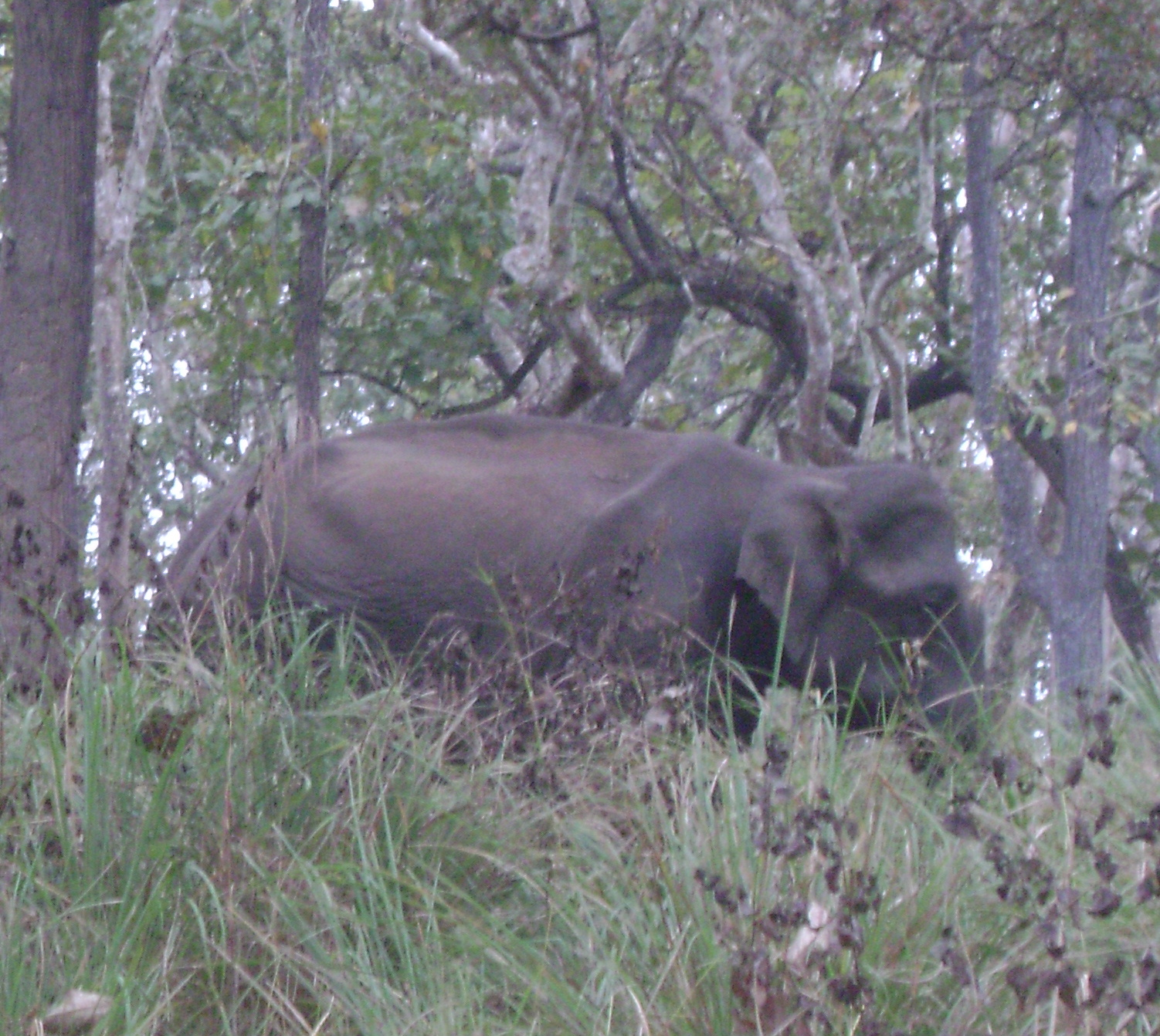
Indian elephant in forest

The elephant population in West Bengal is healthy and expanding. This is causing problems. Elephant depredation or the destruction of human settlements and raiding of agricultural crops has been occurring since ancient times, but the increase in both human and elephant populations in recent years is causing a growing number of incidents. Human-elephant clashes have become a regular feature in the tea gardens of Jalpaiguri district. There is a growing number of reports of poisoning and electrocution of the elephants by farmers trying to protect their fields. In July 2008, an elephant that had strayed out of the Baikunthapur forest range near Jalpaiguri trampled to death one man and injured another who came in its way. The Siliguri-Alipurduar broad gauge line cuts across the corridor that connects the Apalchand Reserve Forest of Baikunthapur Forest Division and the Mal Block of Kalimpong Forest Division. In seven years up to 2008, 26 elephants have been killed by trains on this line.

== Gajoldoba Reservoir ==
Gajoldoba is a reservoir formed by the first Teesta Barrage, which was built for irrigational purposes. It is surrounded by the Baikunthapur forests, and is an hour's drive from Siliguri. The reservoir is used by many water birds from Ladakh and Central Asia including brahminy duck, bar-headed goose, pochard, pintail, shoveller, mallard, black ibis, and many species of stork, cormorant and duck.
