= Lucy Moore (historian) =

British-born historian and writer (born 1970)

Lucy Moore's voice
Recorded April 2013 from the BBC Radio 4 programme Front Row

Lucy Moore (born 1970) is a British-born historian and writer.

== Biography ==
Moore was educated in Britain and the United States and studied history at the University of Edinburgh. She appeared in The Supersizers Eat... the Roaring Twenties in 2009 alongside Sue Perkins and Giles Coren, and in a BBC documentary Glamour's Golden Age in 2013.

== Bibliography ==
- Con Men and Cutpurses: Scenes from the Hogarthian Underworld
- The Thieves Opera: The Remarkable Lives and Deaths of Jonathan Wild, Thief-Taker and Jack Sheppard, House-Breaker (1996)
- Amphibious Thing: The Life of Lord Hervey (2000)
- Maharanis: The Lives and Times of Three Generations of Indian Princesses (2004) (Chimnabai, Maharani of Baroda; Sunity, Maharani of Cooch Behar; Indira Devi, Maharani of Cooch Behar; Gayatri Devi, Maharani of Jaipur)
- Liberty: The Lives and Times of Six Women in Revolutionary France (2007)
- Anything Goes: A Biography of the Roaring Twenties (November 2008)
- Nijinsky: a Life (2013)
- In Search of Us: Adventures in Anthropology (2022)
