= Maharani Gina Narayan =

Gina Narayan

Maharani of Cooch Behar
- Tenure: 1956 – 1970
- Born: Georgina May Egan; 6 May 1930; London, England
- Died: 14 January 2013 (aged 82); Spain
- Spouse: Jagaddipendra Narayan (m. 1956; died 1970)
- Father: Arthur Egan
- Mother: Evelyn Irons

Maharani Gina Narayan (born Georgina May Egan; 6 May 1930 – 14 January 2013), was a British-born fashion model and Indian royal, the second wife of Jagaddipendra Narayan, the Maharaja of Cooch Behar.

== Early life and background ==
Georgina May Egan was born on 6 May 1930, in London, the only child of police constable Arthur Egan and his wife, Evelyn (née Irons). Not much is known of her childhood and early life except that it was modest. Her father died while she was young and her mother subsequently remarried. She was educated at Purley County Grammar School for Girls.

After leaving school she took a secretarial course in shorthand and typing but soon took up fashion modelling. By 18 she was working in London, Paris and Italy. During the late 1940s and early '50s she worked with designers such as Louis Feraud and Norman Hartnell and appeared in Vogue. For a period she worked at the Mayfair Club in London and also for a period worked with Ruth Ellis at the Little Club in Knightsbridge.

== Marriages ==
Egan was married twice. Her first marriage was to businessman Douglas Fisher, to whom she was still married when she met her second husband, Jagaddipendra Narayan, the Maharaja of Cooch Behar, at a dinner party in 1956. Egan and Fisher divorced shortly afterward, and after a three-month romance, Egan privately married Narayan who was 15 years her senior in London on 16 September 1956. Narayan kept the marriage secret from his mother as he was afraid of her reaction and it wasn’t until news of the marriage appeared on 6 August 1959 when the Daily Express published details of it while his mother was in Mumbai. She immediately fell ill. As soon as she well enough she asked that he annul the marriage. Narayan refused to obey as he had done for a previous relationship with the actress Nancy Valentine and moved his new wife into the palace at Cooch Behan. Narayan's mother promptly moved out, permanently.

While Egan was officially recognised as Maharani in January 1960, along with the style of Her Highness. she was never fully accepted by Narayan’s family.

When in India their residence alternated between Cooch Behar and a house at 4 Alipore Park Road, Calcutta.

Narayan died of a heart attack on 11 April 1970. The Alipore house was left to Egan by her husband.

== Later life ==
After 1980, Egan relocated to Spain, where she died on 14 January 2013, aged 82.
