= Sayajirao Gaekwad III =

Maharaja of Baroda from 1875 to 1939

- Farzand-i-Khas-i-Daulat-i-Inglishia, Shrimant Maharaja Sir, Sena Khas Khel Shamsher Bahadur Maharaja Gaekwad of Baroda, GCSI, GCIE, KIH
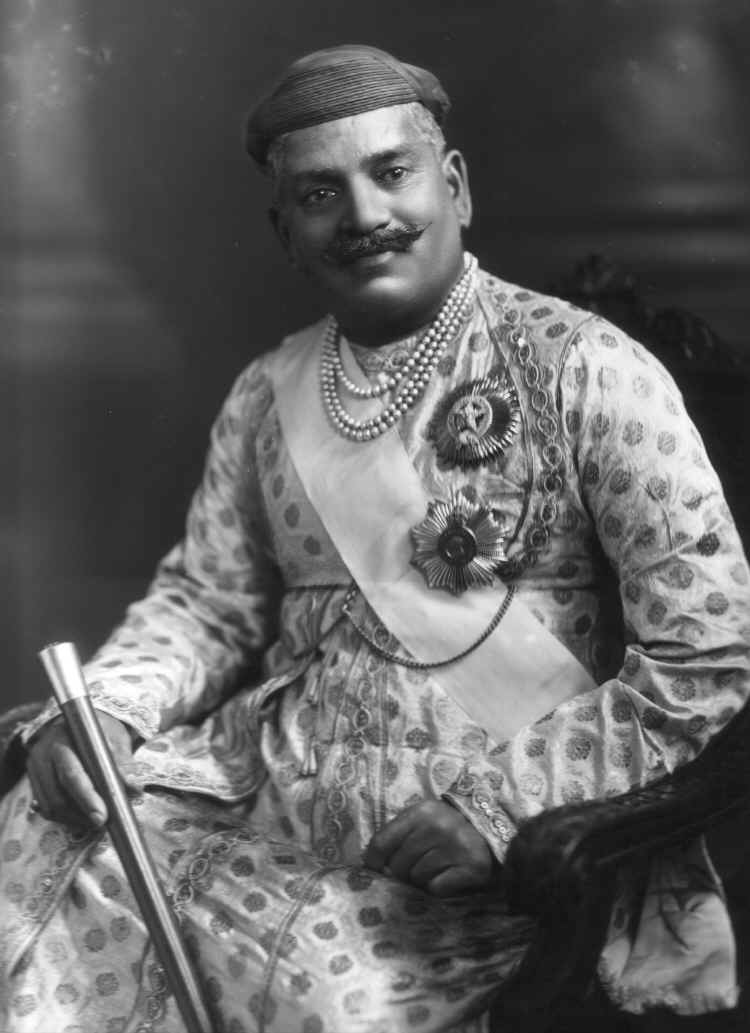
- Sayajirao III Gaekwad, Maharaja of Baroda, 1919

Maharaja of Baroda
- Reign: 10 April 1875 – 6 February 1939
- Coronation: 10 April 1875 (in Baroda)
- Predecessor: Malhar Rao Gaekwad; Madhav Rao Thanjavurkar (de facto)
- Successor: Pratap Singh Rao Gaekwad
- Born: 11 March 1863
- Died: 6 February 1939 (aged 75)
- Consort: Chimnabai I Chimnabai II
- Issue: Shrimant Maharajkumari Bajubai Gaekwad; Shrimant Maharajkumari Putlabai Gaekwad; Yuvaraj Sahib Fatehsinhrao Gaekwad; Shrimant Maharajkumar Jaisinghrao Gaekwad; Shrimant Maharajkumar Shivajirao Gaekwad; Maharani Indira Devi; Shrimant Maharajkumar Dhairyashilrao Gaekwad
- Dynasty: Gaekwad
- Father: Kashirao Gaekwad
- Religion: Hinduism
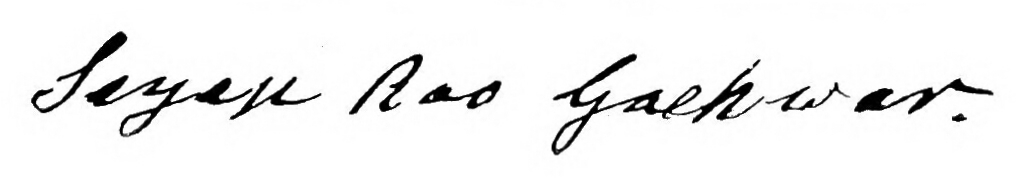
- Signature

Sayajirao Gaekwad III (born as Shrimant Gopalrao Gaekwad; 11 March 1863 – 6 February 1939) was the Maharaja of Baroda State from 1875 to 1939, and is remembered for reforming much of his state during his rule. He belonged to the royal Gaekwad dynasty of the Marathas which ruled parts of present-day Gujarat.

== Early life ==
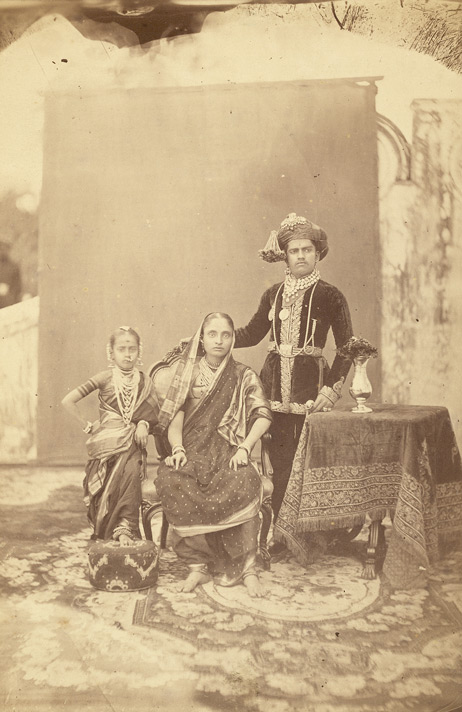
Group portrait with sister Tara Bai and adoptive mother Jamna Bai (Circa 1880)

Sayajirao was born into a Maratha family in the village of Kaulane in Malegaon taluka of Nashik district, as Gopalrao Gaekwad, second son of Kashirao Bhikajirao (Dada Sahib) Gaekwad (1832–1877) and Ummabai. He belonged to a cadet branch of the Gaekwad dynasty, descended from a morganatic marriage of the first Raja of Baroda, and so was not expected to succeed to the throne.

== Matters of succession ==
Following the death of Sir Khanderao Gaekwad, the popular Maharaja of Baroda, in 1870, it was expected that his brother, Malharrao, would succeed him. However, Malharrao had already proven himself to be of the vilest character and had been earlier imprisoned for conspiring to assassinate his brother. As Khanderao's widow, Maharani Jamnabai (1853–1898) was already pregnant with a posthumous child, the succession was delayed until the sex of the child could be proven. The child proved to be a daughter, and so upon her birth on 5 July 1871, Malharrao ascended the throne.

Malharrao spent money liberally, nearly emptying the Baroda coffers (he commissioned a pair of solid gold cannon and a carpet of pearls, among other expenses) and soon reports reached the Resident Robert Phayre of Malharrao's gross tyranny and cruelty. Malharrao further attempted to cover up his deeds by attempting to poison Phayre with a compound of arsenic. By order of the Secretary of State for India, Lord Salisbury, Malharrao was deposed on 10 April 1875 and exiled to Madras, where he died in obscurity in 1882.

== Ascending the Throne ==
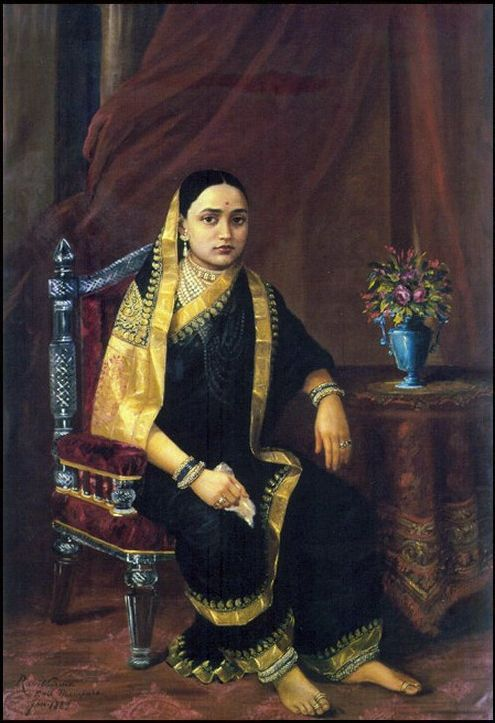
Maharani Chimnabai by Raja Ravi Varma.

With the throne of Baroda now vacant, Maharani Jamnabai called upon the heads of the various branches of the dynasty to come to Baroda and present themselves and their sons in order to decide upon a successor. Kashirao and his three sons, Anandrao (1857–1917), Gopalrao (1863–1939) and Sampatrao (1865–1934) walked to Baroda from Kavlana -a distance of some 600 kilometers- to present themselves to Jamnabai. It is reported that when each son was asked the purported reason for presenting themselves at Baroda, Gopalrao unhesitatingly stated: "I have come here to rule".

Gopalrao was selected by the British as successor and was accordingly adopted by Maharani Jamnabai, on 27 May 1875. He was also given a new name, Sayajirao. He ascended the gadi at Baroda on 16 June 1875 but, being a minor, reigned under a Council of Regency until he came of age. He was invested with full ruling powers on 28 December 1881. During his minority he was extensively tutored in administrative skills by Raja Sir T. Madhava Rao who groomed his young protégé into a person with foresight and with a will to provide welfare to his people. In this period Madhava Rao restored the state to its normal conditions following the chaos in which it had been left by Malharrao.

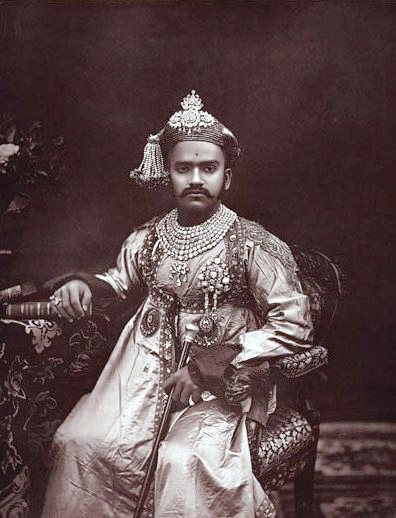
H H Gaekwar of Baroda in 1889

== Rule and modernization ==
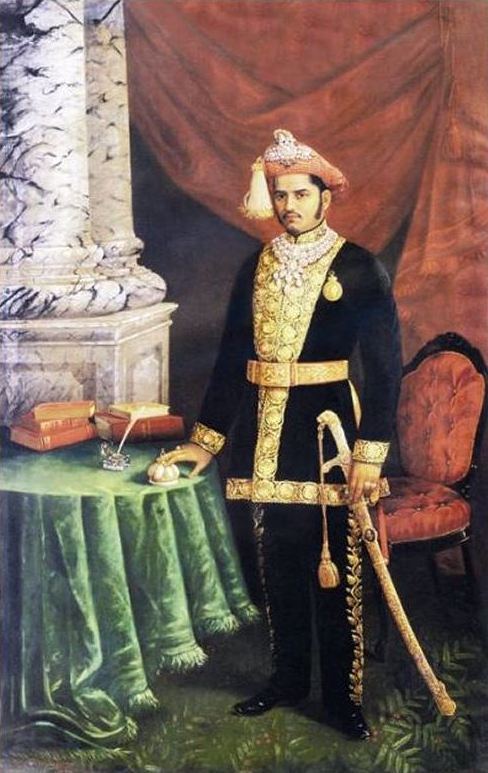
Maharaja Sayaji Rao, portrait by Raja Ravi Varma.

On assuming the reins of government, some of his first tasks included education of his subjects, uplifting of the downtrodden, and judicial, agricultural and social reforms. He played a key role in the development of Baroda's textile industry, and his educational and social reforms included among others, a ban on child marriage, legislation of divorce, removal of untouchability, spread of education, development of Sanskrit, ideological studies and religious education as well as the encouragement of the fine arts.

His economic development initiatives included the establishment of a railway (see below) and the founding in 1908 of the Bank of Baroda, which still exists and is one of India's leading banks, with numerous operations abroad in support of the Gujarati diaspora.

Fully aware of the fact that he was a Maratha ruler of Gujarat, he identified himself with the people and shaped their cosmopolitan attitude and progressive, reformist zeal. His rich library became the nucleus of today's Central Library of Baroda with a network of libraries in all the towns and villages in his state. He was the first Indian ruler to introduce, in 1906, compulsory and free primary education in his state, placing his territory far in advance of contemporary British India.

To commemorate his vision and administrative skills, Baroda Management Association has instituted Sayaji Ratna Award in 2013, named after him.

== Heritage and views ==
As a prince of a native state, he guarded his rights and status even when this brought him into dispute with the British government. Sayajirao was often in conflict with them on matters of principle and governance, having continuous and longstanding verbal and written disputes with the Residents as well as with the Viceroy and officials in the Government of India. However he was granted the title of Farzand-i-Khas-i-Daulat-i-Inglishia ("Favoured Son of the English Nation") on 29 December 1876. He attended the Delhi Durbars of 1877, 1903 and 1911; it was at the 1911 Delhi Durbar that an incident occurred that proved to have far-reaching ramifications for Sayajirao's relations with the Raj.

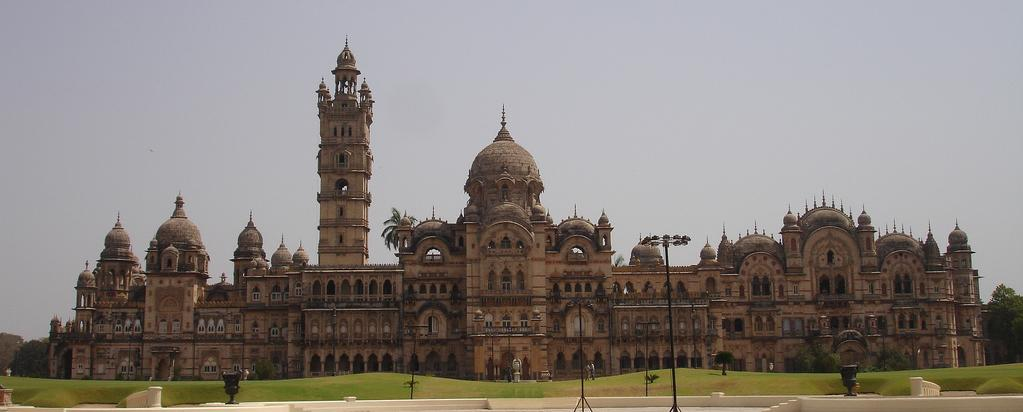
Laxmi Vilas Palace, Vadodara, built in 1890 by Maharaja Sayajirao Gaekwad III

=== Delhi Durbar 1911 ===
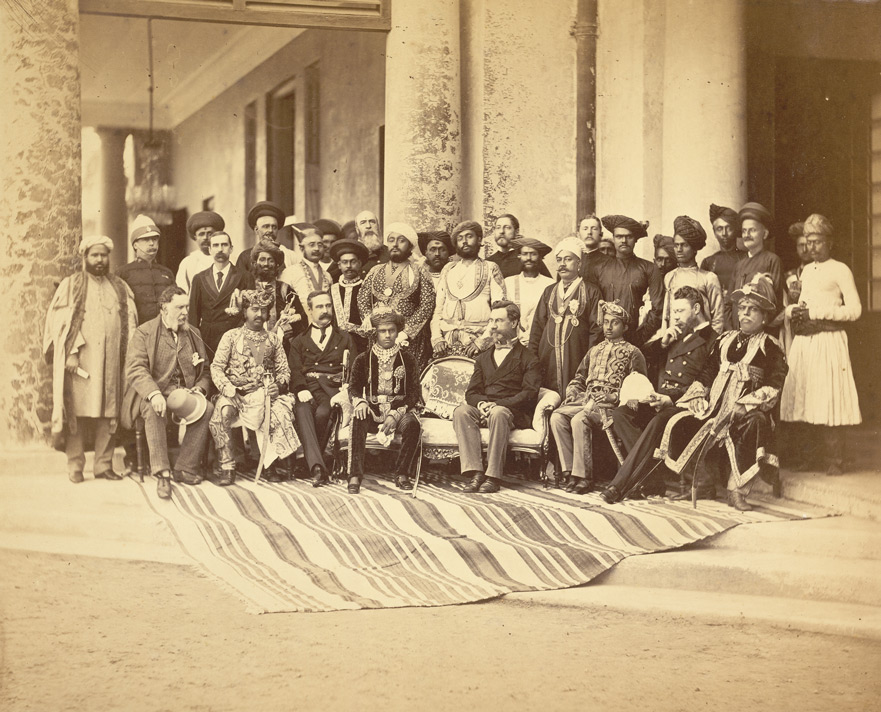
Sayajirao with Sir Richard Temple, the Governor of Bombay and other members of the court. c. 1880

At the grand and historic Delhi Durbar of 1911, attended by George V— the first time that a reigning British monarch had travelled to India, each Indian ruler was expected to perform proper obeisance to the King-Emperor by bowing three times before him, then backing away without turning their back on the monarch.

As the third-most prestigious Indian ruler, Sayajirao was third in line to approach the King-Emperor; already, he had caused consternation among the British officials by refusing to wear his full regalia of jewels and honours (it was expected that the rulers on formal occasions would present themselves in full regalia). While some accounts state that he refused to bow, Sayajirao actually did bow, albeit perfunctorily and only once before turning his back on the King-Emperor. According to his granddaughter Gayatri Devi, she states in her autobiography that due to some reason he had been unable to attend the rehearsals and didn't know how to greet The King-Emperor. Other eyewitness reports state he walked away "laughing".

For several years already, Sayajirao had angered the British by his open support for the Indian National Congress and its leaders; the incident before the King-Emperor proved to be the last straw. The British never fully trusted Sayajirao again, although he was openly forgiven when he was awarded a GCIE in 1919.

He gave a donation for the establishment of the Central Library in the Banaras Hindu University which is named after him as "Sayaji Rao Gaekwad Central Library".

== Public works ==
=== Railways and waterworks ===
During his reign a large narrow gauge railway (Gaekwar's Baroda State Railway) network, which was started in 1862 was expanded further with Dabhoi at its focal point. It is still Asia's largest narrow gauge railway network.

Sayajirao envisioned a water supply scheme for Baroda in 1892 at Ajwa that would use gravity to supply drinking water to the people of Baroda. To this day a large portion of Vadodara City gets its drinking water from this source.

=== Parks and universities ===
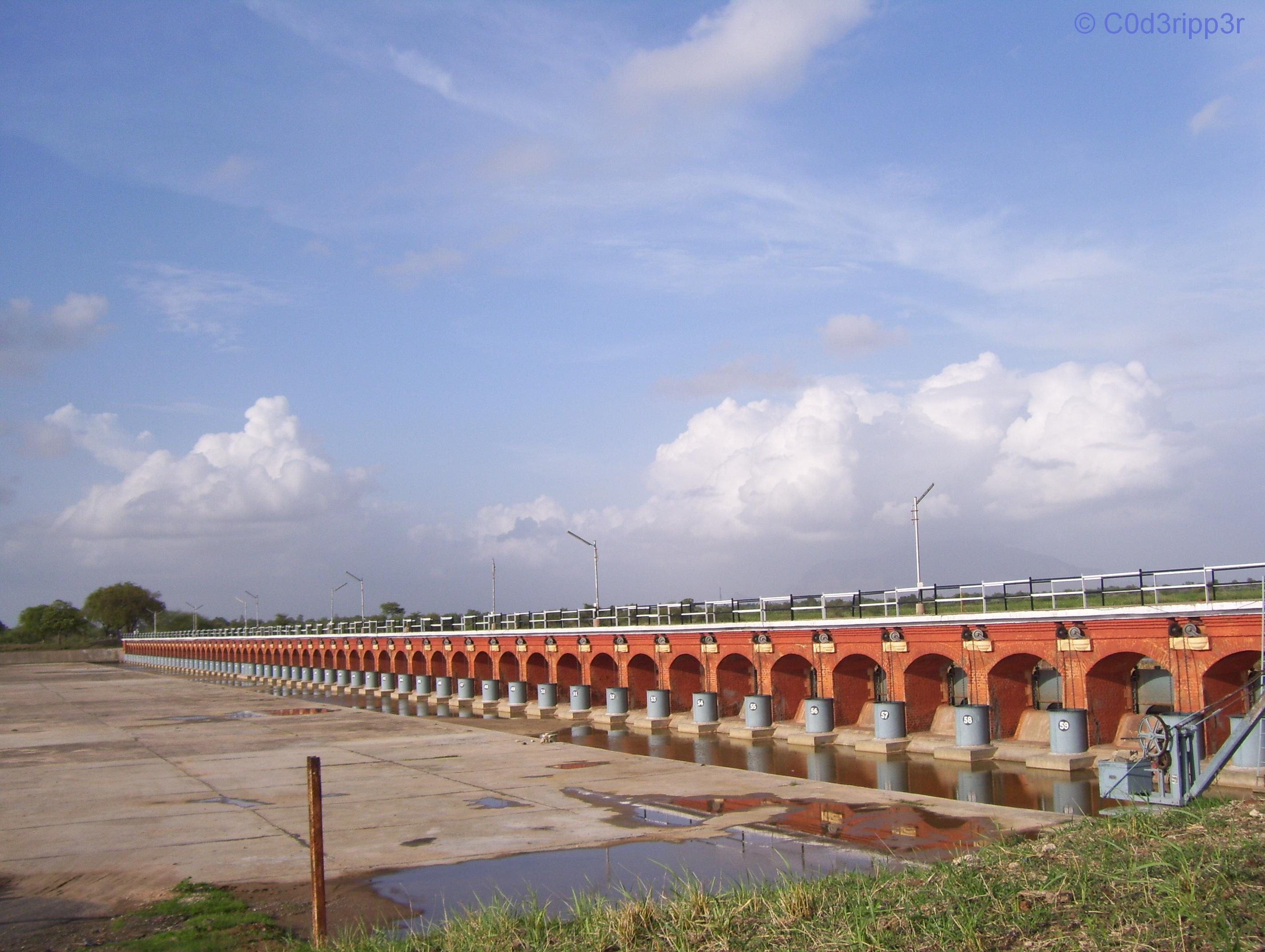
Ajwa Reservoir, with 64 gates

The large public park originally called Kamati Baug and now called Sayaji Baug was his gift to the city of Vadodara. On the Diamond Jubilee of his accession to the throne, he set apart large funds out of his personal and state funds for setting up a University in Vadodara for the benefit of students from the rural areas of his state – a task that was ultimately completed by his grandson Sir Pratapsinghrao Gaekwad, who founded the Maharaja Sayajirao University and settled the trust as desired by his grandfather. This trust is known as the Sir Sayajirao Diamond Jubilee and Memorial Trust and caters for the education and other needs of the people of the former state of Baroda.

== Patronage ==
He recognised talent from among his people. He supported education and training of persons who in his opinion would shine in life. Those persons whom he patronised included Dr. Babasaheb alias Bhimrao Ramji Ambedkar, later the head of the drafting committee of the Indian Constitution that came to force in 1950; Vitthal Ramji Shinde, the founder of the “Mission to the depressed class” and one of the most important social & religious reformers in Maharashtra; and Dadabhai Naoroji, who started his public life as the Dewan (Minister) to the Maharaja in 1874 and thereafter went on to become the first Asian Member of the British House of Commons where he made no secret of the fact that he would also be representing 250 million of his fellow subjects in India. He also sent his Agriculture Commissioner Chintaman Vishnu Sane to The United States of America for research in that field. He appointed V. T. Krishnamachari as the Diwan of Vadodara. Sayajirao Gaekwad III Maharaj sent Mahadev Krishnaji Jadhav to England to study architecture. Upon his return, he was appointed the state architect in 1941. Hailing from a poor Maratha family in Mumbai, Maharaj saw a spark in him. Noting his aptitude and creativity, he appointed him as the state architect. Jadhav was instrumental in lending the State of Baroda a unique architectural style through his works such as the Rani Chimnabai Hospital.

Sayajirao used to visit England every year to select outstanding young people to join his service and in one of such visits he met 20-year-old Sri Aurobindo whom he immediately offered a job at Baroda College. Sri Aurobindo returned to India in 1893 to join the Baroda service. Another Bengali gen Syed Mujtaba Ali also taught there.

In 1895 the Maharaja is claimed to have witnessed the successful flight of an unmanned aircraft constructed by S. B. Talpade, which happened eight years before the Wright brothers took to the skies.

== Cultural and material interests ==
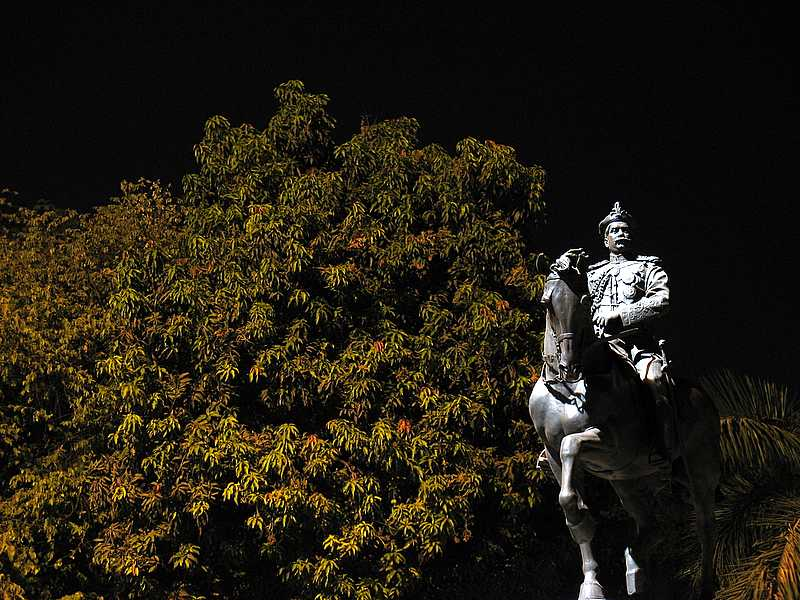
Maharaja Sayajirao Gaekwad III, Kala Ghoda Statue at Vadodara

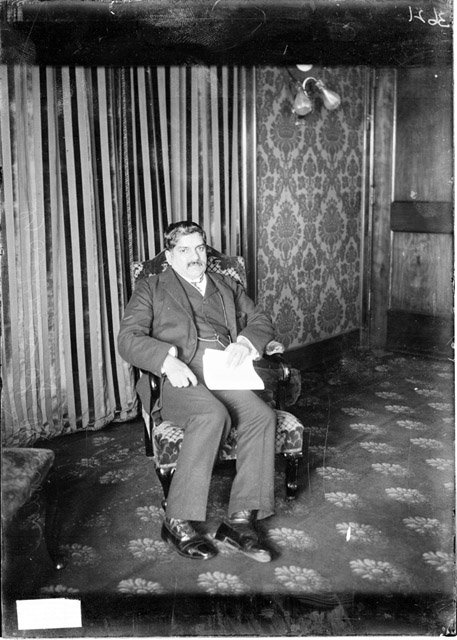
Gaekwad in Chicago, United States in 1906.

The Maharaja was a noted patron of the arts. During his reign, Baroda became a hub for artists and scholars. The celebrated painter, Raja Ravi Varma, was among those who spent substantial periods of time at his court.

== Science ==
Sayajirao commissioned and paid for research and its publication by James Hornell on Marine Biology, which to this day remains a key source of information.

=== Jewellery ===
Sayajirao had a notable collection of jewels and jewellery. This included the 128.48 carat, 25.696g "Star of the South" diamond, the "Akbar Shah" diamond and the "Princess Eugenie" diamond.

=== Classical music ===
Sayajirao was also a patron of Indian classical music. Ustad Moula Bux founded the Academy of Indian Music (Gayan Shala) under his patronage in 1886. This Academy later became the Music College and is now the Faculty of Performing Arts of the Maharaja Sayajirao University of Vadodara. Apart from Ustad Moula Bux, Sayajirao's court boasted great artistes like Abdul Karim Khan, Inayat Khan and Ustad Faiyaz Khan. In 1916, the first All India Music Conference was held in Baroda.

=== Dance ===
The Maharaja Sayajirao University of Vadodara started the first dance programme in India in 1950. Over the centuries there had been many alliances and marriages between Baroda's kings and princesses. Musicians and Dancers were often part of cultural exchange as dancers, poets and musicians were status symbols for the royal courts and maharajas had as many artists as they could afford. In 1880 the Maharani Laksmi Bai (Chimnabai I) of Tanjore married Maharaja Sayajirao III. Chimnabai I was knowledgeable in Bharatanatyam and Carnatic music, and upon marriage, she brought a troupe with her comprising two dancers, two nattuvanars (leaders of Bharatanatyam concerts) and two teachers (Khandwani 2002). Others followed later, including Nattuvanar Appaswamy and his dancer wife Kantimati, who had studied with Kannusamy and Vadively, two members of the Tanjore Quartet. After the death of Appaswamy in 1939, Kantimati and their son, Guru Shri Kubernath Tanjorkar, left Baroda to teach in Lucknow, and then worked in the film industry in South India until Sayajirao's successor, Pratap Singh Rao Gaekwad recalled the family to Baroda in 1949 to teach in the Music Department in the Kalavan Palace, later absorbed into the Maharaja Sayajirao University (Gaston 1996: 158–160). Later Guruvarya Shri Kubernath Tanjorkar established his own Institute, the Tanjore Dance Music & Art Research Centre at Baroda with his son Guru Shri Ramesh Tanjorkar and Guru Smt. Leela R. Tanjorkar (Kubernath Tanjorkar's family is devoted to Bharatnatyam dance now including their grandsons Rajesh and Ashish). So what we have here is a tradition of very distinguished Bharatanatyam dancers and teachers, members of a family considered an offshoot of the Tanjore Quartet bani (stylistic schools; Gaston 1996: 159), already established in Gujarat by the time Mrinalini set up her own academy. Yet there is a sense that what she did was not new.

== Family ==
Maharaja Sayajirao initially married Shrimant Lakshmibai Mohite of Tanjore (Chimnabai I) (1864–1884) on 6 January 1880, by whom he had a son and two daughters:

1. Shrimant Maharajkumari Bajubai Gaekwad (1881–1883)
2. Shrimant Maharajkumari Putlabai Gaekwad (1882–1885)
3. Lieutenant-Colonel Shrimant Yuvaraja Fatehsinhrao Gaekwad, Yuvaraj Sahib of Baroda (3 August 1883 – 14 September 1908). He died young, having had a son and two daughters, including Pratap Singh Rao Gaekwad, who succeeded to the throne in 1939 as Maharaja of Baroda.

His first wife died young from tuberculosis, and Sayajirao married on 28 December 1885 another Maratha lady from Dewas, Shrimant Gajrabai (1871–1958), who became Chimnabai II upon her wedding. A strong proponent of rights for Indian women, she proved every bit as willful and capable as her husband for the 53 years of their marriage, becoming equally well known throughout India. They had several sons and one daughter:

1. Shrimant Maharajkumar Jaisinghrao Gaekwad (12 May 1888 – 27 August 1923); no children
2. Shrimant Maharajkumar Shivajirao Gaekwad (31 July 1890 – 24 November 1919); had two sons and one daughter.
3. Maharani Indira Devi, Maharani and Maharani Regent of Cooch Behar (Indiraraje) (19 February 1892 – 6 September 1968). Married Jitendra Narayan of Cooch Bihar in 1911; had issue. Her descendants include the models Riya Sen and Raima Sen. She became a Maharani Regent of Cooch Behar and the mother of Gayatri Devi of Jaipur.
4. Lieutenant-Colonel Shrimant Maharajkumar Dhairyashilrao Gaekwad (31 August 1893 – 5 April 1940); had three sons and two daughters.

Other descendants of Sayajirao would wed the rulers of Kolhapur, Sawantwadi, Akkalkot, Jath, Dewas Jr., Kota, Dhar, Jasdan, Sandur and Gwalior.

=== Family tree ===
- Sayajirao Gaekwad III
  - Bajubai Gaekwad (kanit) (1881–1883)
  - Putlabai Gaekwad (1882–1885)
  - Fatehsinhrao Gaekwad (1883–1908)
    - Pratap Singh Rao Gaekwad and two daughters
      - Fatehsinghrao Gaekwad (1930–1988)
      - Mrunalini Devi Puar (1931–2015)
        - a daughter
      - Premila Raje Gaekwad (1933–)
        - a son and a daughter
      - Sarla Raje Gaekwad (1935–)
        - a son and a daughter
      - Vasundharadevi Raje Gaekwad (1936–)
        - three sons and a daughter
      - Ranjitsinh Pratapsinh Gaekwad (1938–2012)
        - Samarjitsingh Gaekwad (1967–)
        - Alaukika Raje (1988–)
        - Anjana Raje (1999–)
      - Lalitadevi Raje Gaekwad (1939–)
      - Sangramsinhrao Gaekwad (1941–)
        - Pratapsinhrao Gaekwad (1970–)
        - Priyadarshini Raje Sahib Gaekwad (1975–)
      - Sayajirao Gaekwad (1945–1985)
  - Jaisinghrao Gaekwad (1888–1923)
  - Shivajirao Gaekwad (1890–1919)
    - two sons and a daughter
  - Indira Devi (Indiraraje) (1892–1968)
    - Gayatri Devi and two other daughters and two sons
      - later descendant Maharani Sahiba of kota, Rajasthan Uttara Devi, Maharani of Payagpur Baharaich Udaya Raje (Pixie), Bharat Dev Burman Father of Riya Sen and Raima Sen
  - Dhairyashilrao Gaekwad (1893–1940)
    - three sons and two daughters
  - Other descendants

== Death ==
The Arjan Koli and Hari Koli were two Koli brothers from Dhari town. They saved the life of Maharaja Sayajirao Gaekwad III of Baroda State from a lion during hunting in 1933. After that both brothers were respected in open court (Baroda state darbar) and their bronze statues were established in royal Sayaji Baug by Sayajirao Gaekwad.

After a long and eventful reign of 63 years, Sayajirao Gaekwad III died on 6 February 1939, one month shy of 76. His grandson and heir, Pratap Singh Rao Gaekwad, became the next Maharaja of Baroda.

== Titles ==
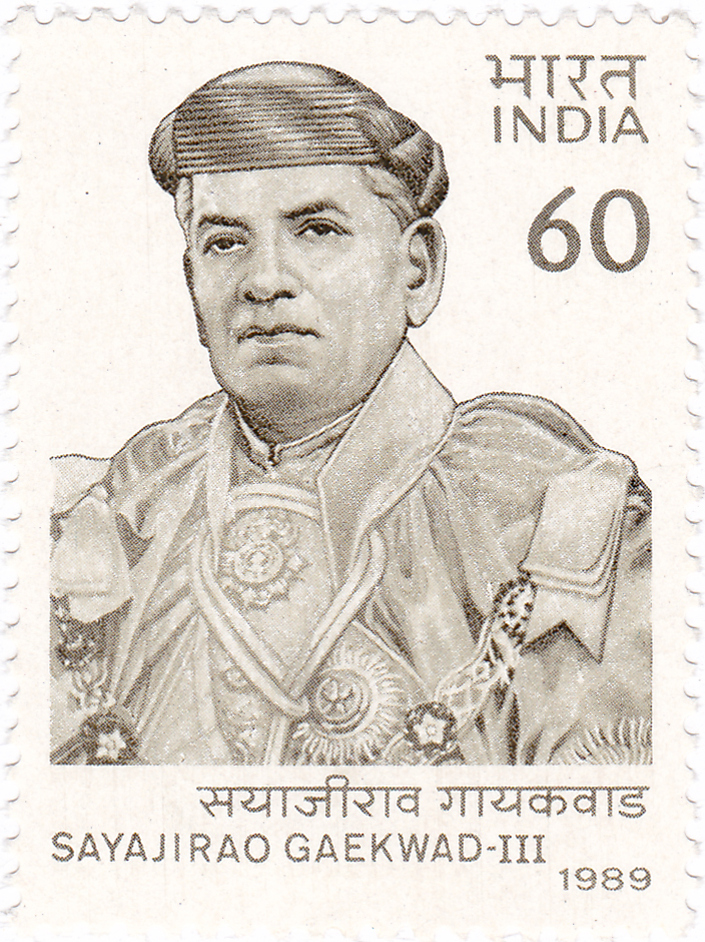
Sayajirao Gaekwad III 1989 stamp of India

- 1863–1875: Shrimant Gopalrao Gaekwad
- 1875–1876: His Highness Shrimant Maharaja Sayajirao III Gaekwad, Sena Khas Khel Shamsher Bahadur, Maharaja of Baroda
- 1876–1887: His Highness Farzand-i-Khas-i-Daulat-i-Inglishia, Shrimant Maharaja Sayajirao III Gaekwad, Sena Khas Khel Shamsher Bahadur, Maharaja of Baroda
- 1887–1919: His Highness Farzand-i-Khas-i-Daulat-i-Inglishia, Shrimant Maharaja Sir Sayajirao III Gaekwad, Sena Khas Khel Shamsher Bahadur, Maharaja of Baroda, GCSI
- 1919–1939: His Highness Farzand-i-Khas-i-Daulat-i-Inglishia, Shrimant Maharaja Sir Sayajirao III Gaekwad, Sena Khas Khel Shamsher Bahadur, Maharaja of Baroda, GCSI, GCIE

== Honours ==
- Prince of Wales's Gold Medal-1875
- Empress of India Gold Medal-1877
- Knight Grand Commander of the Order of the Star of India (GCSI)-1887
- Delhi Durbar Gold Medal-1903
- Delhi Durbar Gold Medal-1911
- Knight Grand Commander of the Order of the Indian Empire (GCIE)-1919
- Hon. LLD (Benares Hindu University)-1924
- Bailiff Grand Cross of the Order of St John (GCStJ)-1932
- King George V Silver Jubilee Medal-1935
- King George VI Coronation Medal-1937

== See also ==
- Atlas the Barbary lion versus the Bengal tiger of Simla
- Bank of Baroda
- Baroda Museum and Picture Gallery
- Sayaji Rao Gaekwad Library (Central Library), BHU
- Princely State
- Maratha Empire
- Sayaji Ratna Award

Sayajirao Gaekwad III Gaekwad dynasty Born: 11 March 1863 Died: 6 February 1939
Regnal titles
Preceded by Malhar Rao Gaekwad and Madhav Rao Thanjavurkar (de facto)	Maharaja of Baroda; 1875–1939	Succeeded by Pratap Singh Rao Gaekwad
