= Chimnabai II =

Queen of Baroda, Gujarat, British India

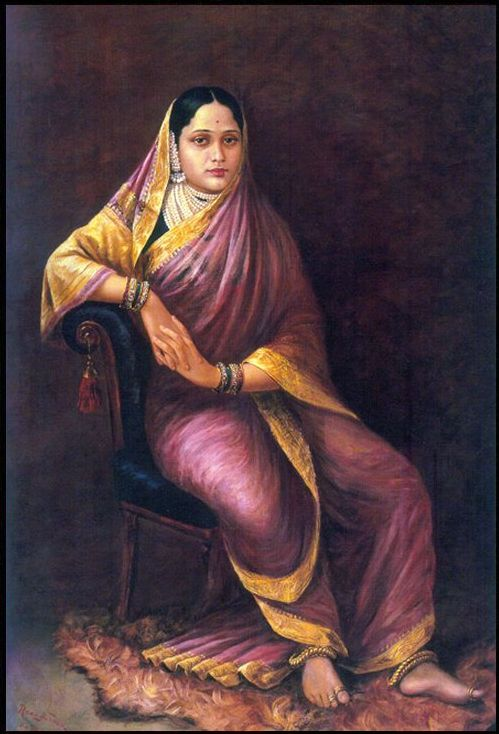
- Maharani Chimnabai of Baroda
- Born: 1872
- Died: 1958 (aged 85–86)

Maharani Chimnabai II (1872 – 23 August 1958) was a queen and the second wife Maharaja Sayajirao Gaekwad of the princely state of Baroda, Gujarat, British India. She is the author of the treatise The position of Women in Indian Life (1911), and was the first president of the All India Women's Conference (AIWC) in 1927–1928, as well as the president of the National Council of Women in India in 1928–1937.

== Biography ==
Shrimant Gajarabai became Chimnabai II upon marrying Sayajirao Gaekwad in 1885.

A progressive woman, she worked toward education for girls, abolishing the purdah system and child marriage, and became the first president of the AIWC in 1927. She is the author of the treatise The position of Women in Indian Life (1911).

Her daughter Indira Devi became the consort of Jitendra Narayan, Maharajah of Cooch Behar.

== Works ==
- Chimnabai II (Maharani of Baroda.); Siddha Mohana Mitra (1911). Position Of Women In Indian Life. New York: Longman's, Green & Co.
