= Jitendra Narayan =

Maharaja of Cooch-Behar from 1913–1922

Jitendra I Narayan
- Maharaja of Cooch-Behar
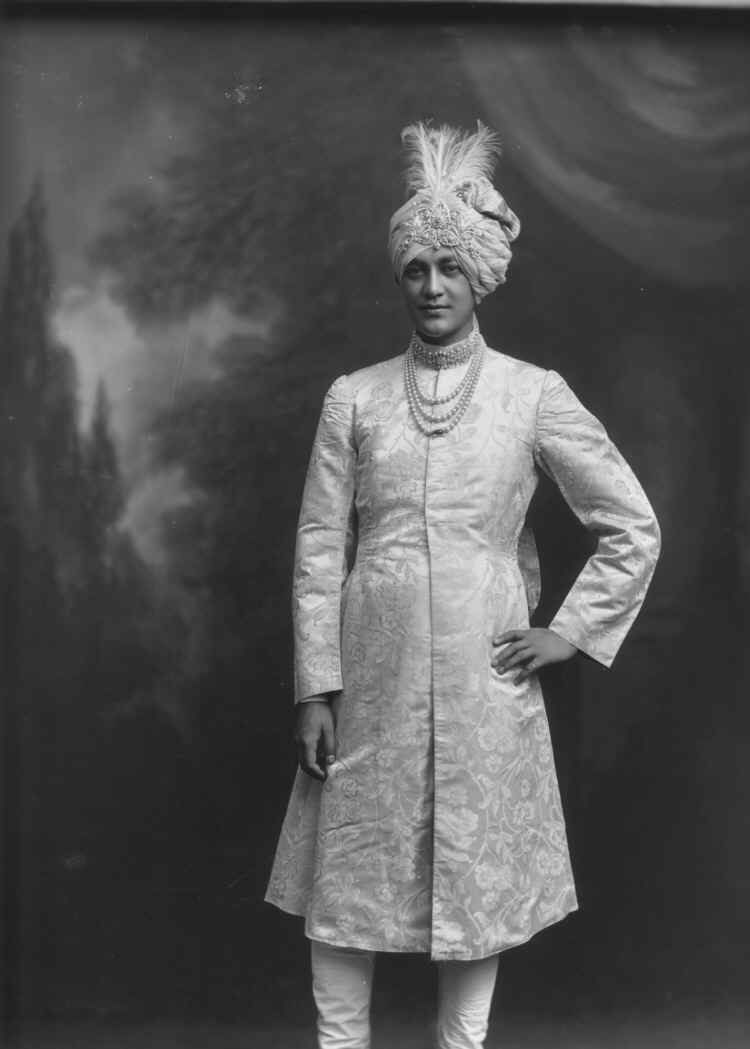

Maharaja (King) of Cooch-Behar
- Reign: 1 September 1913 – 20 December 1922
- Predecessor: Rajendra Narayan II
- Successor: Jagaddipendra Narayan I
- Born: Prince Jitendra Narayan of Cooch-Behar; 20 December 1886; Royal Palace, City of Cooch-Behar, Kingdom of Cooch-Behar (now West Bengal), Empire of India (now Republic of India)
- Died: 20 December 1922 (aged 36); London, United Kingdom
- Spouse: Princess Indira Raje of Baroda (m. 1913 - 1922; his death)
- Issue: Princess Ila Devi; Jagaddipendra Narayan I of Cooch-Behar; Prince Indrajitendra Narayan; Queen Gayatri Devi, Queen Consort of Jaipur; Queen Menaka Devi, Queen Consort of Dewas-Dewas
Regnal name
- Shri Jitendra Narayan I Bhup Bahadur
- House: Cooch-Behar
- Father: Nripendra Narayan I of Cooch-Behar
- Mother: Suniti Sen

Jitendra Narayan I of Cooch-Behar KCSI (20 December 1886 – 20 December 1922) was the Maharaja (King) of the Kingdom of Cooch-Behar in Bengal, Empire of India, from September 1913 until his death in December 1922.

== Early life ==
Jitendra Narayan was born on 20 December 1886 at the Royal Palace of Cooch-Behar in the Kingdom of Cooch-Behar, as the third child and second son of Maharaja Nripendra Narayan I and his wife Maharani Suniti Devi.

He had two elder siblings, Crown Prince Rajendra Narayan (1862-1911) and Princess Sukriti Devi (1884-1958) and was followed by four younger siblings, Prince Victor Nityendra Narayan (1888-1937), Prince Hitendra Narayan (1890-1920), Princess Prathiba Devi (1891-1923) and Princess Sudhira Devi (194-1968).

== Marriage ==
He was married to Gujarati Princess Indira Raje of Baroda, the only living daughter of Maharaja Sayajirao Gaekwad III of Baroda and Maharani Chimnabai. When they had met, Indira was already engaged to Maharaja Madhorao Scindia I of Gwalior, Maharaja of Gwalior. The couple's elopement took the families by shock. At the time Jitendra Narayan, as a younger son, was not expected to take the throne.

He was father of two sons Jagaddipendra Narayan, Indrajitendra Narayan and three daughters, Ila Devi, Gayatri Devi and Menaka Devi.

== Work ==
He established Nripendra Narayan Memorial High School in the year 1916.

== Cricket ==
_
- Cricket career

Cricket information

Domestic team information
- Years: Team
- 1918: Maharaja of Cooch-Behar's XI
- Only First-class: 18 March 1918 Maharaja of Cooch Behar's XI v Lord Willingdon's XI

Career statistics
Competition	First-class
Matches	1
Runs scored	33
Batting average	16.50
100s/50s	0/0
Top score	18
Catches/stumpings	0/–
- Source: CricketArchive, 18 September 2011

He played one first-class cricket match, for his own side, scoring 33 runs in total.

Maharaja Jitendra Narayan I House of Cooch-Behar Cadet branch of the Dynasty of Cooch Born: 20 December 1886 Died: 20 December 1922
Indian royalty
Regnal titles
Preceded by Maharaja Rajendra Narayan II	Maharaja (King) of Cooch-Behar; 01 September 1913 – 20 December 1922	Succeeded by Maharaja Jagaddipendra Narayan I
