= Suniti =

Suniti may refer to

- Suniti Academy. Girls school in Cooch Behar, West Bengal.
- Suniti Devi, Maharani of Coochbehar, India
- Suniti Kumar Chatterji, Indian linguist, educationist and litterateur.
- Suniti Namjoshi, poet and a fabulist.
- Suniti Solomon, Pioneer in HIV and AIDS research in India
