= Nripendra =

Nripendra is an Indian male given name and may refer to:

- Nripendra Misra, Indian civil servant
- Nripendra Narayan, former ruler of Cooch Behar
  - Nripendra Narayan Government High School, in Debiganj, Rangpur, Bangladesh
  - Nripendra Narayan Memorial High School, in Tufanganj, Cooch Behar, West Bengal, India
- Nripendra Nath Roy, Indian politician
- Nripendra Nath Sircar, Indian lawyer and politician
