= Suniti Academy =

Sunity Academy, Coochbehar
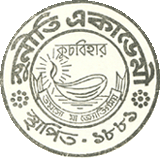
- Logo of the Sunity Academy

Location
- Victor Prince Nripendra Narayan Road, Kochbihar, West Bengal, 736101; India
- Coordinates: 26°19′07.7″N 89°26′30.1″E

Information
- Motto: Sanskrit: তমসো মা জ্যোতির্গময় (From darkness to light)
- Established: 1881
- Founder: His Highness Maharaja Nripendra Narayan, the Maharaja of Cooch Behar
- School district: Kochbihar
- Headmistress: Bhupali Roy
- Colors: White; Green
- Affiliation: WBBSE & WBCHSE
- Website: coochbehar.nic.in

Sunity Academy is a higher secondary girls' school in Cooch Behar, West Bengal, India.

== History ==
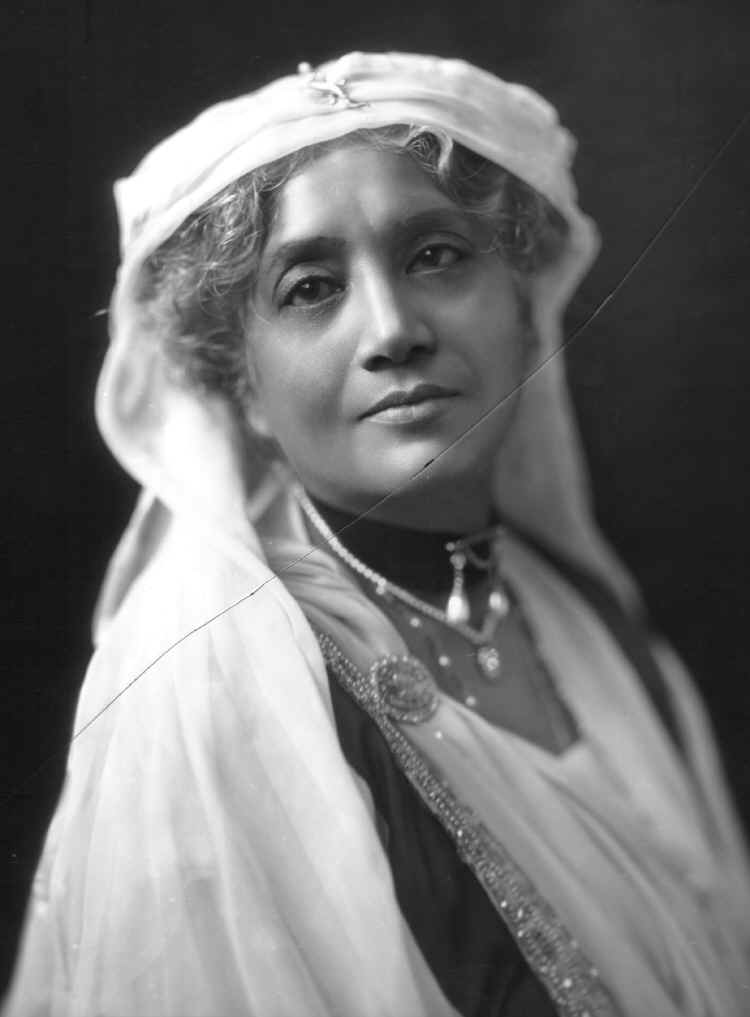
Her Highness Maharani Sunity Devi, the Maharani of Cooch Behar

The school was founded in 1881 as Sunity College by His Highness, the Maharaja of Cooch Behar. It was named after Her Highness Maharani Suniti Devi, who was the brain behind its establishment. She was the daughter of Keshub Chandra Sen.

The school was rechristened as Sunity Academy in 1916. In 1928, the Sunity Academy was affiliated to the University of Calcutta. However, the school is now attached to University of North Bengal since its inception in 1962.

In 1937, when the representative of the Governor General of the Eastern States came to visit Sunity Academy, he was highly impressed with its management.

In 2003, the erstwhile president of India, APJ Abdul Kalam visited the school. In 2004, Her Highness Gayatri Devi, the Rajmata of Jaipur and the Princess of Cooch Behar, paid a visit. In 2006, the school celebrated its 125th anniversary.

Maharani Suniti Devi's second son Maharaja Jitendra Narayan Bhup Bahadur's three daughters Princesses Ila, Gayatri and Menaka (Princesses of Cooch Behar) appeared for their matriculation examination from Sunity Academy.

== Notable alumni ==
- Anjana Bhowmick, actress
- Aparajita Goppi, politician and activist
- Parvathy Baul, performing artist

== See also ==
- Nripendra Narayan Memorial High School
- Jenkins School
- List of schools in West Bengal
