= Suniti Devi =

Maharani of Indian state of Cooch Behar (1864–1932)

Suniti Devi সুনীতি দেবী
- Maharani of Cooch Behar; Her Highness; CIE
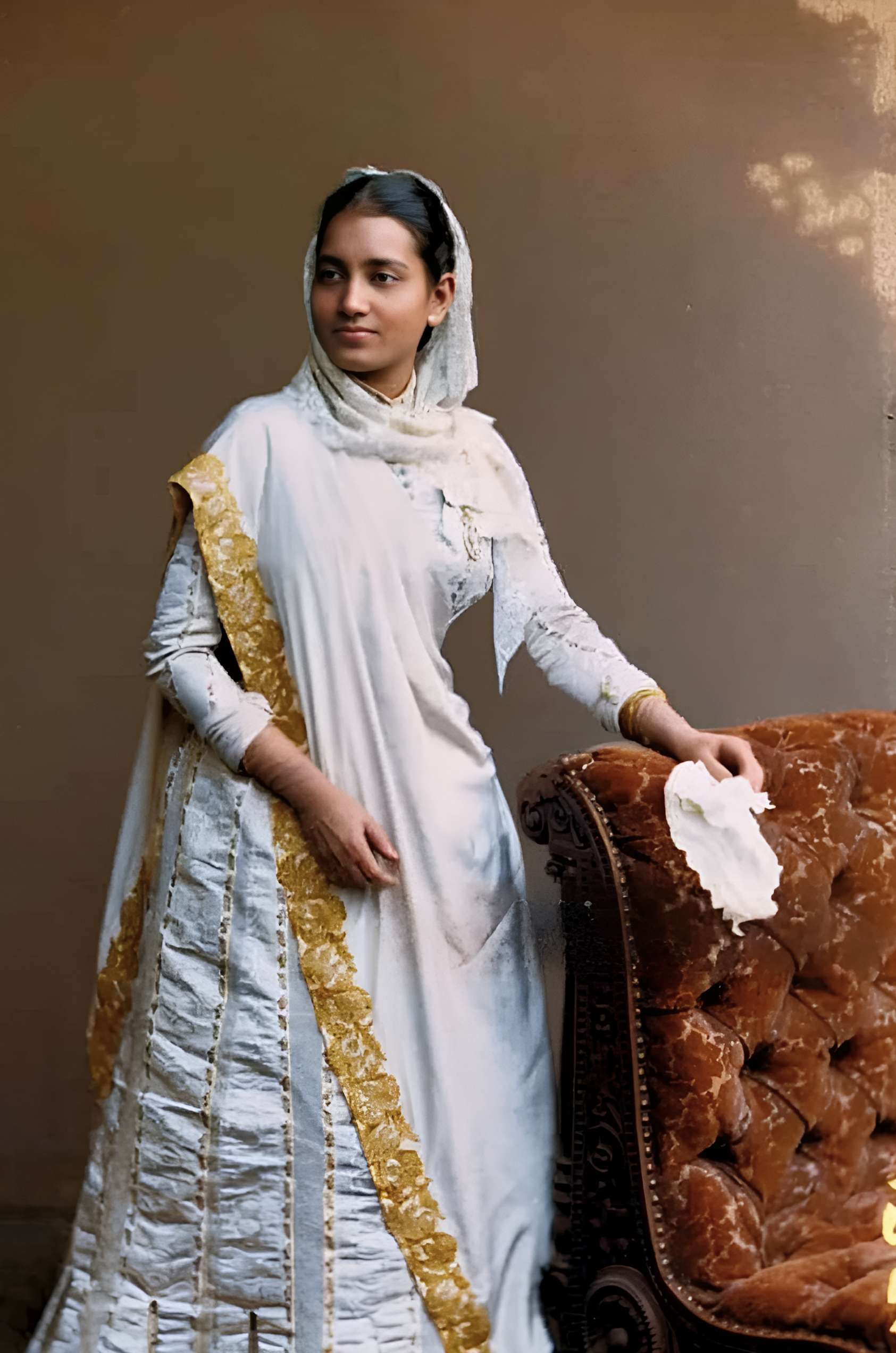
- Maharani Suniti Devi, c. 1885

21st Maharani of Cooch Behar
- Reign: 8 November 1883– 10 November 1932
- Born: Calcutta, Bengal Presidency, British India (now Kolkata, India); 30 September 1864
- Died: 10 November 1932 (aged 68); Ranchi, Bengal Presidency, British India (now Jharkhand, India)
- Burial: Brahmo Cemetery, Kolkata, India
- Spouse: Nripendra Narayan (m. 1878; died 1911)
- Issue: Rajendra Narayan; Sukriti Devi; Jitendra Narayan; Victor Nityendra Narayan; Hitendra Narayan; Prativa Sundari Devi; Sudhira Sundari Devi
- Native language: Bengali
- Dynasty: Koch dynasty
- Father: Keshub Chandra Sen
- Mother: Jaganmohini Devi
- Religion: Brahmoism
- Occupation: Educator, Social worker, Author

Her Highness Maharani Suniti Devi Narayan (née Sen), CIE (30 September 1864 – 10 November 1932), was an educator, social worker, author and the queen of the princely state of Cooch Behar, British India.

== Early life ==
Suniti Devi was a daughter of the renowned Brahmo Samaj reformist, Keshub Chandra Sen of Calcutta, and Jagonmohini Sen. She was married to Nripendra Narayan (1863-1911), the Maharaja of Cooch Behar in 1878, when she was only fourteen years of age. She stayed at her father's place for two years after marriage, as Narayan left for London for higher studies immediately after their marriage.

She was the mother of four sons and three daughters: sons Rajendra Narayan (b.1882), Jitendra Narayan (b.1886), Victor Nityendra Narayan (b.1888), and Hitendra Narayan (b.1890), and daughters Sukriti Devi (b.1884), Pratibha Devi (b.1891) and Sudhira Devi (b.1894).

Her daughters Sudhira and Pratibha married two brothers, Alan and Miles Mander, of Wightwick Manor in England. The Manor is part of the National Trust and open to visit. Sukriti Devi married Jyotsna Nath Ghoshal, the eldest son of Swarnakumari Devi (Rabindranath Tagore's sister) and Janaki Nath Ghoshal. Suniti Devi's sons, Rajendra Narayan and Jitendra Narayan later became Maharajas of Cooch Behar. Gayatri Devi and Ila Devi were daughters of her son Jitendra Narayan Bhup Bahadur.

== Work ==
In 1887, her husband, Nipendra Narayan was awarded GCIE and she was awarded CIE. Suniti Devi became the first Indian woman to be awarded CIE. She attended the Diamond Jubilee celebrations of Queen Victoria in 1898 and the Delhi Durbar of 1911 with her husband, the Maharaja of Cooch Behar. She, along with her sister, Sucharu Devi, were noted for their elegant dress.

Her husband had set up in her name a girls' school in 1881 which was later named Suniti Academy. Suniti Devi was the brain behind the establishment of the school.

She was an educationalist and a women's rights activist at heart, gave annual grants for the institution, exempted the girl students from paying tuition fees and also rewarded the successful students. She had arranged for palace cars to bring the girl students from home to school and back. In an effort to avoid any controversy, she ordered that the windows of the cars should be covered by curtains.

She, along with her sister Sucharu Devi (Maharani of Mayurbhanj) also financed the foundation of Maharani Girls' High School in Darjeeling in 1908. She was the President of the State Council and also the first President of All Bengal Women's Union in 1932 and worked along with other women's rights activists from Bengal like Charulata Mukherjee, Saroj Nalini Dutt, T. R Nelly and her sister Sucharu Devi.

She authored a book "The Beautiful Mogul Princesses", which was published in 1918 by W. Thacker & Co. 2, Creed Lane, Ludgate Hill, London. This book contains the intimate life stories of the Mughal princesses Mumtaz Mahal, Reba, Zebunissa and Nur Jahan. She also authored a short story collection, "Bengal Dacoits and Tigers", published in 1916 by Thacker, Spink and Company, Calcutta. Her final publication was "The Life of Princess Yashodara: Wife and Disciple of the Lord Buddha," London: Elkin Matthews and Marrot Limited, 1929; this has since been reprinted by Kessinger Legacy Reprints (www.kessinger.net).

She died suddenly in the year 1932 at Ranchi.

== Titles ==
1887 – Companion of the Order of the Crown of India on the occasion of her attending with her husband Nripendra Narayan, the Golden jubilee celebration of Queen Victoria.

== Legacy ==
The school Sunity Acadamey, the Sunity Road and a water body the "Sunity Tank" (also known as "Bairagi Dighi") all located in her home town Cooch Behar is named after her.
