= Maharani Girls' High School =

Maharani Girls High School

Location
- West Bengal; India; 27.0372835°N 88.2619141°E

Information
- Established: 1908; 118 years ago
- Founder: Maharani Suniti Devi & Maharani Sucharu Devi
- School district: Darjeeling
- Category: Higher Secondary
- Campus: Urban
- Affiliations: WBBSE & WBCHSE

Maharani Girls High School is a Higher Secondary school for girls located at Darjeeling, West Bengal, India.

== History ==
The school was founded in 1908 through the efforts of Hemlata Sarkar, daughter of Sivanath Sastri, who was a Brahmo reformist. Hemlata was aided by Suniti Devi, the queen or Maharani of the princely state of Koch Bihar, and her sister, the Maharani Sucharu Devi of Mayurbhanj State, both daughters of another Brahmo reformist Keshub Chandra Sen. The maharanis funded the school and it was, therefore, was named Maharani Girls School. It was upgraded to a High School in 1911.

The school is affiliated with the West Bengal Board of Secondary Education and teaching is in Bengali, Nepali and English; Sanskrit is also taught as a subject.

== See also ==
- Education in India
- List of schools in India
- Education in West Bengal
