= Hitendra Narayan =

Indian cricketer (1890–1920)

Hitendra Pal
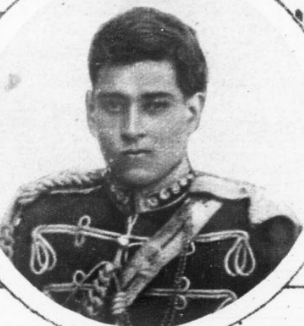

Personal information
- Full name: Hitendra Pal
- Born: 1 July 1890; Coochbehar, Bengal Presidency, British India
- Died: 7 November 1920; Darjeeling, Bengal Presidency, British India
- Batting: Right-handed
- Relatives: Jitendra Narayan (brother)

Domestic team information
- Years: Team
- 1909–1910: Somerset
- 1918–1919: Maharaja of Cooch-Behar's XI

Career statistics
Competition	First-class
Matches	7
Runs scored	60
Batting average	6.66
100s/50s	0/0
Top score	16
Balls bowled	90
Wickets	0
Bowling average	–
5 wickets in innings	0
10 wickets in match	0
Best bowling	0/6
Catches/stumpings	2/–
- Source: CricketArchive, 16 October 2017

Maharaj Kumar Hitendra Singh Narayan (1 July 1890 – 7 November 1920), commonly anglicised as Prince Hitendra Narayan, played first-class cricket for Somerset in 1909 and 1910. He later played in first-class matches for teams brought together by his brother, the Maharaja of Cooch Behar.

Known variously in his cricket career as "Kumar Narayan" or "Hitendra Narayan", he was educated at Eton College and Cambridge University and was a forceful right-handed batsman. His four first-class matches for Somerset in 1909 and 1910 were not successful, with a top score of just 16 in his first game, against the 1909 Australians. In 1918, he played three matches for his brother's scratch side against teams composed largely of expatriate Englishmen. The matches have first-class status although all three were of only two-days' duration; Narayan was not successful in any of them as a batsman.

== Early life ==
Hitendra Singh Narayan was born in Cooch Behar, Bengal, India, on 1 July 1890. He was the youngest of four sons born to Nripendra Narayan, the Maharaja of Cooch Behar State. The Maharaja was a keen sportsman, and funded at least three cricket teams in India, as well as hosting polo, horse racing and wrestling on his palatial estate. A history of the Eden Gardens cricket ground in Kolkata describes Nripendra as "a patron of cricket without parallel in east India." Two of Hitendra Narayan's older brothers, Jitendra Narayan and Victor Narayan, played first-class cricket. Hitendra Narayan was tutored as a child by John Daniell, an English sportsman who had played top-level rugby union and cricket. Narayan continued his education in England, first at Farnborough School, and then Eton College, where he enjoyed some sporting success, being school junior champion in the high jump, and runner-up in the long jump. He went up to Pembroke College, Cambridge, where he played cricket for his college, but did not make it into the university team.

== County cricket ==
Daniell returned to cricket in 1908, rejoining Somerset County Cricket Club as captain, and that year, Narayan had great success as a batsman for the amateur "Somerset Stragglers" cricket team. Contemporary reports eulogised his batting, though in his history of Somerset cricket, Peter Roebuck includes Narayan in his "litany of incompetents". He made scores of 104 and 103 for the Stragglers in one drawn match against the Devon Dumplings, while another time, he scored 99 and 91 against Incogniti. The following season, he was given his debut in a match against the touring Australians on 10 June 1909, scoring three runs in the first innings and sixteen in the second in a low-scoring loss for Somerset. In the second innings, he was one of only two batsmen to reach double figures for the county. Narayan played in that match due to special dispensation from the Australians, as he had not yet qualified for Somerset. His batting in the match was praised in a letter in The Sportsman, especially his "fine defensive game under most trying conditions". He appeared later in the year as a substitute fielder against Middlesex.

In 1910, Narayan qualified for Somerset on residency grounds. At the time, Somerset were suffering financial problems, and selected players based on how little they could pay them, rather than purely on their ability. A Somerset cricket historian, David Foot, suggested that Somerset also "were susceptible to exotic grandeur and haughty lineage". Narayan played three County Championship matches for Somerset, generally as a lower-order batsman; against Kent he scored two and three, against Surrey, fourteen and six, while against Gloucestershire he opened the batting in the first innings, but scored just one run. Somerset lost two of the matches, and drew the other – that season they finished bottom of the County Championship without winning a single match. In Somerset Cricketers 1882 – 1914, Stephen Hill suggests that Narayan grew bored of the novelty of county cricket and left in 1911, returning to India.

== Later life ==
He was commissioned as an Honorary Lieutenant on 15 October 1914 in the Indian Expeditionary Force during the First World War, initially as part of the Dehra Dun Brigade, and later the Garhwal Brigade. He was posted as a staff officer to the general officer commanding. On 22 June 1915, he was mentioned in dispatches, for his role in the Battle of Neuve Chapelle. He was injured on the Western Front in 1915 and spent the rest of the war in India. He later served as Military Secretary to Bhupinder Singh of Patiala.

His father had died in 1911, and his oldest brother, Rajendra had succeeded him as Maharaja, though he only lived two more years before succumbing to illness, and another brother, Jitendra, ascended to the throne. He continued his father's tradition of sporting patronage, and the "Maharaja of Cooch-Behar's XI" played five first-class matches between November 1917 and January 1919. Hitendra played in three of these matches, though with little success; he scored fifteen runs at an average of 7.50. He died from influenza on 7 November 1920, in Darjeeling.
