= Sudhira Sundari Devi =

Sudhira Sundari Devi Narayan
- Maharajkumari
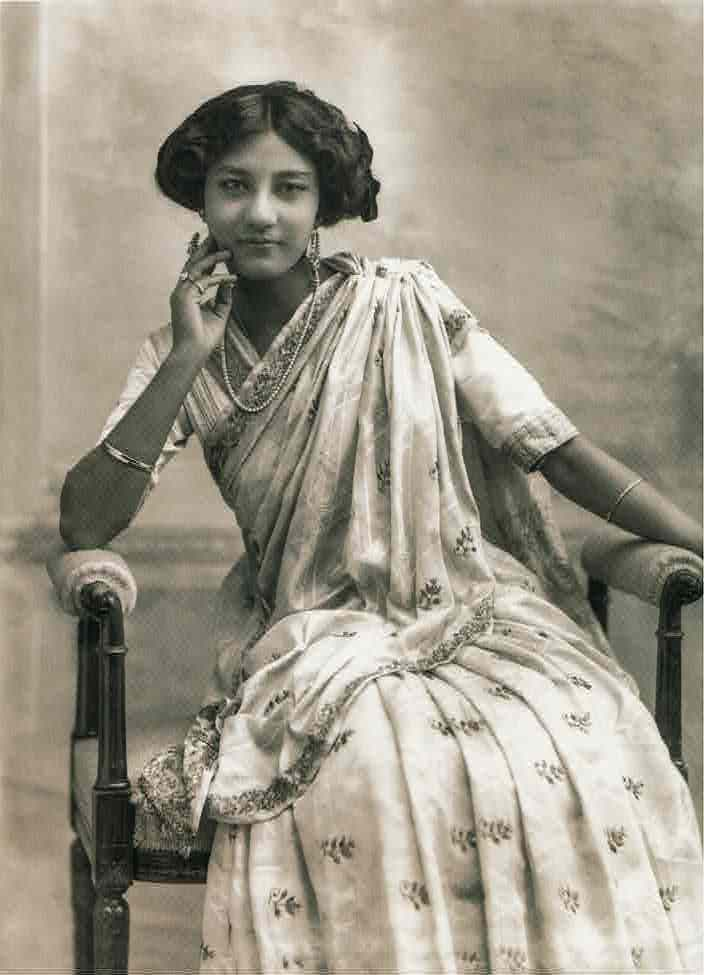
- Princess Sudhira of Cooch Behar, Bassano Ltd. (1910)
- Born: 7 March, 1894; Calcutta, British India
- Died: 7 January, 1968 (aged 73); London, United Kingdom
- Spouse: Alan Mander (m.1914)
- Dynasty: Koch
- Father: Nripendra Narayan
- Mother: Suniti Devi

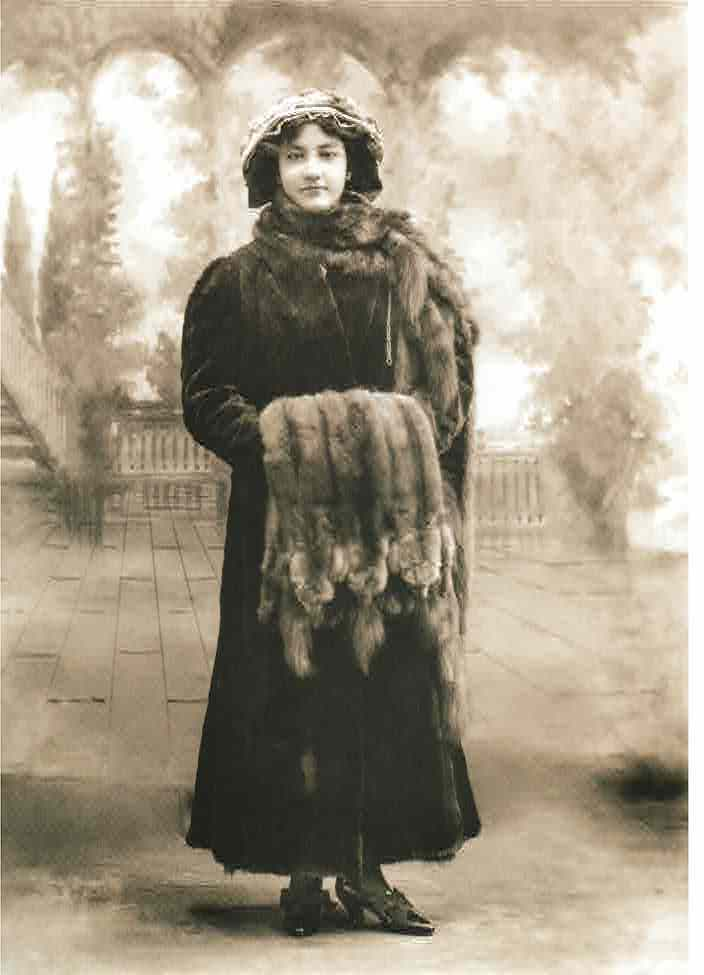
Princess Sudhira of Cooch Behar (1910)

Sudhira Sundari Devi Narayan of Cooch Bihar, also known as Princess Mander, was an Indian princess of the princely state of Cooch Behar, British India. She was born in Calcutta on 7 March 1894, the youngest daughter of H.H. Sri Sri Maharaja Sir Nripendra Narayan Bhup Bahadur, Maharaja of Cooch Behar, by his wife H.H. Maharani Sunity Devee Sahiba, sometime Regent of Cooch-Behar and President of the State Council.

She married at Woodlands, Calcutta, on 25 February 1914 Alan Mander, brother of Lionel (who had married her sister Prativa Sundari Devi in 1912) and Geoffrey Mander of Wightwick Manor, by whom she had two sons and two daughters.

In London, Princess Sudhira became noted for her campaigns for better relations between England and India, agitating for Indian women's suffrage with her sister Prativa Sundari Devi, her aunt Mrinalini Sen and Princess Sophia Duleep Singh, working with the latter for the Red Cross as Voluntary Aid Detachment members and fundraising for Indian soldiers during the First World War.

She died at 40 Hereford Rd, London, on 7 January 1968, when her will was proved in London on 15 February 1968 at £91.

== See also ==
- Mander family
- Sunity Devee (1921), The Autobiography of an Indian Princess, London: J. Murray, on the Internet Archive
