= Sucharu Devi =

Maharani of Mayurbhanj (1874–1959)

Maharani of Mayurbhanj Sucharu Devi Her Highness
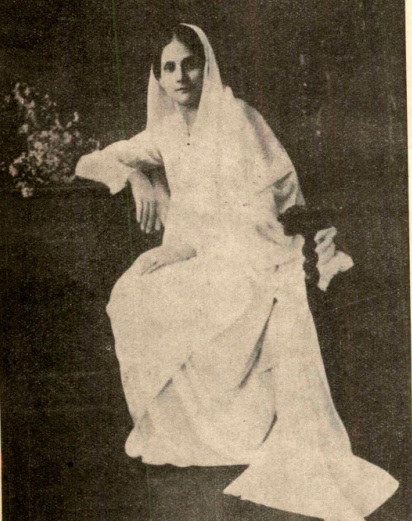
- Born: 9 October 1874; Calcutta, Bengal, British India (now Kolkata, India)
- Died: 14 December 1959 (aged 85); Calcutta, West Bengal, India
- Known for: Social worker, educator
- Spouse: Sriram Chandra Bhanj Deo (m. 1904; died 1912)
- Parents: Keshub Chandra Sen (father); Jaganmohini Devi (mother)
- Relatives: Suniti Devi (sister)

Her Highness Maharani Sucharu Devi (or Suchara Devi) (9 October 1874 – 14 December 1959) was the Maharani of Mayurbhanj State, India.

== Early life ==
She was born in a Bengali Hindu family. She was daughter of the Brahmo Samaj reformer Maharshi Keshub Chandra Sen of Calcutta. Mother's name was Jagonmohini Sen. She married the Maharaja of Mayurbhanj State, Sriram Chandra Bhanj Deo (1871–1912) in 1904, as his second wife, after the death of his first wife. From her marriage with the Maharaja, she had one son and two daughters. Their only son, Kumar Dhrubendra Bhanj Deo (1908–1945), was a Royal Air Force pilot, who died in action during World War II. She spent a major portion of her life in Mayurbhanj Palace, the royal residence of rulers of Mayurbhanj State. Her husband built a mountain retreat in Shillong, where she spent her summer time and Rabindranath Tagore visited there as guest few times. The house is popular as Mayurbhanj palace which is a part of the North Eastern Hill University (NEHU) campus now.

She and her sister, the Maharani of Koch Bihar, Suniti Devi, were noted for their elegant style of dressing.

== Work ==
She and her sister Suniti Devi founded the Maharani Girls' High School at Darjeeling in 1908. Maharani Sucharu Devi was elected president of the Bengal Women's Education League in 1931. After the sudden death of his sister, Suniti Devi, in 1932, she was elected president of All Bengal Women's Union. In Calcutta she was known as a women's rights activist like her contemporaries Charulata Mukherjee, Saroj Nalini Dutt, T. R. Nelly, and her elder sister Suniti Devi the Maharani of Cooch Behar.

She died in 1959.
