= Mrinalini Sen =

First Indian to fly

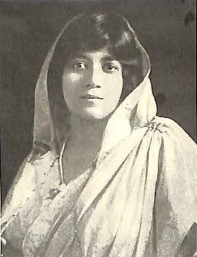
- Born: 3 August 1879; Bhagalpur, India
- Died: 8 March 1972 (aged 92); Calcutta, India
- Known for: Being the first Indian to fly in a plane.

Mrinalini Sen (3 August 1879 – 8 March 1972) was a Bengali writer in British India. On 19 December 1910, she became the first Indian to fly in a plane.

== Life ==
Mrinalini Devi was born in 1878, into the Luddhi family of Bhagalpur, Bihar, India. She was married to the Raja of Paikpara, at the age of 12 and became a young widow a few years later. She met Nirmal Chandra Sen, the son of Keshub Chandra Sen and a civil servant, in a social gathering. After placing her brother on the throne of Paikpara, she eloped and married Nirmal Chandra Sen. She had four children - NC Sen (Jr), Srilata, Arati, and Anjali. Her daughters had anglicised names that they used: Violet, Pansy and Rosie.

Both were prominent members of Calcutta’s elite society, and it was during the late 1900s when Mrinalini Devi got the chance to undertake the historic flight on 19 December 1910 and become the first Indian to fly in a plane. In 1910, the Belgian pilot Jules Tyck had brought a Farman biplane and a Bleriot XI monoplane to operate the first manned flight out of India. A Times of India report dated 22 December 1910 mentions that the Belgian baron, Pierre de Caters, took off on a biplane from the grounds of the Tollygunge Club with Sen seated behind the pilot’s seat. The occasion was also covered by French newspapers and a British magazine.

Immediately after the historic flight, both moved to England and returned to India before World War II began. She wrote poetry and they were often published in the biweekly Desh literary magazine.

She died on 8 March 1972.
