= Jaganmohini Devi =

British Indian woman poet and lyricist

- Born: Jaganmohini Majumdar; 26 December 1847; Bally, Howrah, Bengal Presidency, (now West Bengal India )
- Died: 1 March 1898 (aged 50)
- Known for: Bengali literature
- Spouse: Keshub Chandra Sen
- Children: 10 including Suniti Devi, Sucharu Devi
- Parent: Chandramohan Majumdar (father)

Jaganmohini Devi or Jaganmohini Sen (née Majumdar) (Bengali: জগন্মোহিনী দেবী) (26 December 1847 – 1 March 1898) was a British Indian woman poet and lyricist.

== Biography ==
Jaganmohini Devi was born to Chandramohan Majumdar on 26 December 1847 in Bali, Howrah district, West Bengal, British India. She was the wife of Brahmananda Keshub Chandra Sen, the founder of the Brahmo Samaj in India. They had ten children, including five sons and five daughters. The eldest daughter, Suniti Devi, was an educator, social worker, author, and the queen of the princely state of Cooch Behar, British India. Another daughter, Sucharu Devi, was the Maharani of Mayurbhanj State, India. Jaganmohini Devi was not known as the wife or mother of any famous person. She was a poet and lyricist. She gained fame by composing songs related to the Navavidhan Samaj. A collection of her 114 songs was published in 1911 following her death on 1 March 1898.
