= Aparajita Goppi =

Indian politician

- Born: 1931
- Died: 28 December 2020 (aged 88–89); Kolkata, West Bengal, India
- Title: Member of the Legislative Assembly of West Bengal
- Term: 1977 to 1991

Aparajita Goppi (1931 – 28 December 2020) was an Indian politician. In 2013, she became a Central Committee member of the All India Forward Bloc. She was a secretariat member of the party in West Bengal and in the early 2000s, Goppi was the highest-ranking member of the All India Forward Bloc in West Bengal. She was the chairwoman of the All India Agragami Mahila Samity, the women's wing of the party. Goppi was a Member of the Legislative Assembly of West Bengal between 1977 and 1991. Goppi was a colleague of Askok Ghosh.

As a student at Suniti Academy in Cooch Behar, she led students in struggle for the right to observe Netaji Subhash Chandra Bose's birthday.

Goppi contested the 1972 West Bengal Legislative Assembly election from the Cooch Behar North seat. She finished in second place with 19,846 votes (40.07%). She contested and won the same seat in the 1977 assembly election. She obtained 32,792 votes (63.07%). Goppi retained the Cooch Behar North seat in 1982, getting 46,810 votes (57.15%), and in the 1987 election, obtaining 49,172 votes (54.74%).

Goppi died on 28 December 2020, due to complications with COVID-19.
