= Narendra Narayan =

Maharaja of Cooch-Behar from 1847 to 1863

- Maharaja of Koch Bihar
- Reign: 1847 – 1863
- Coronation: 23 August 1847
- Predecessor: Shivenra Narayan
- Successor: Nripendra Narayan
- Born: 1841
- Died: August 6, 1863 (aged 21–22)
- Issue: Nripendra Narayan, Jatindra Narayan
- Dynasty: Koch dynasty
- Religion: Hinduism

Narendra Narayan (1841–1863) was the Maharaja of princely state of Koch Bihar, India, from 1847 to 1863.

In the year 1845, he was adopted by his uncle, the Maharaja of Koch Bihar, Shivenra Narayan, when his own son died at an early age. Later, upon death of his father on 23 August 1847, he was installed to the throne of Koch Bihar, but was only granted full ruling powers in 1860 upon his attaining the age.

He was the first ruler of Koch Bihar to have English education. He had two sons, namely Jatindra Narayan and Nripendra Narayan. While Nripendra Narayan went on to become the maharaja of Koch Bihar, Jatindra Narayan became the Raja of Chitranjan and Rupnarayanpur. He later took up the name J. Bose. His descendants, Salil Kumar Bose and Saibal Kumar Bose, are now considered the royal family of Koch Bihar, as they are the only descendants left of the Koch dynasty.

He is noted for having banned Sati practice in his state.

He had founded Jenkins School in Koch Bihar in 1861, which is one of the oldest boys' school of West Bengal

He died on 6 August 1863 and was succeeded by his second son Nripendra Narayan.

The Narendra Narayan Park, which a botanical garden in Koch Bihar town established in 1892 is named after him.

Political offices
Preceded by Maharaja Shivendra Narayan Bhup Bahadur	Maharaja of Cooch Behar; 1847-1863	Succeeded by Maharaja Nripendra Narayan II
