= European Cemetery, Cooch Behar =

Cemetery in West Bengal

- N.E.L.C. Christian Burial Ground
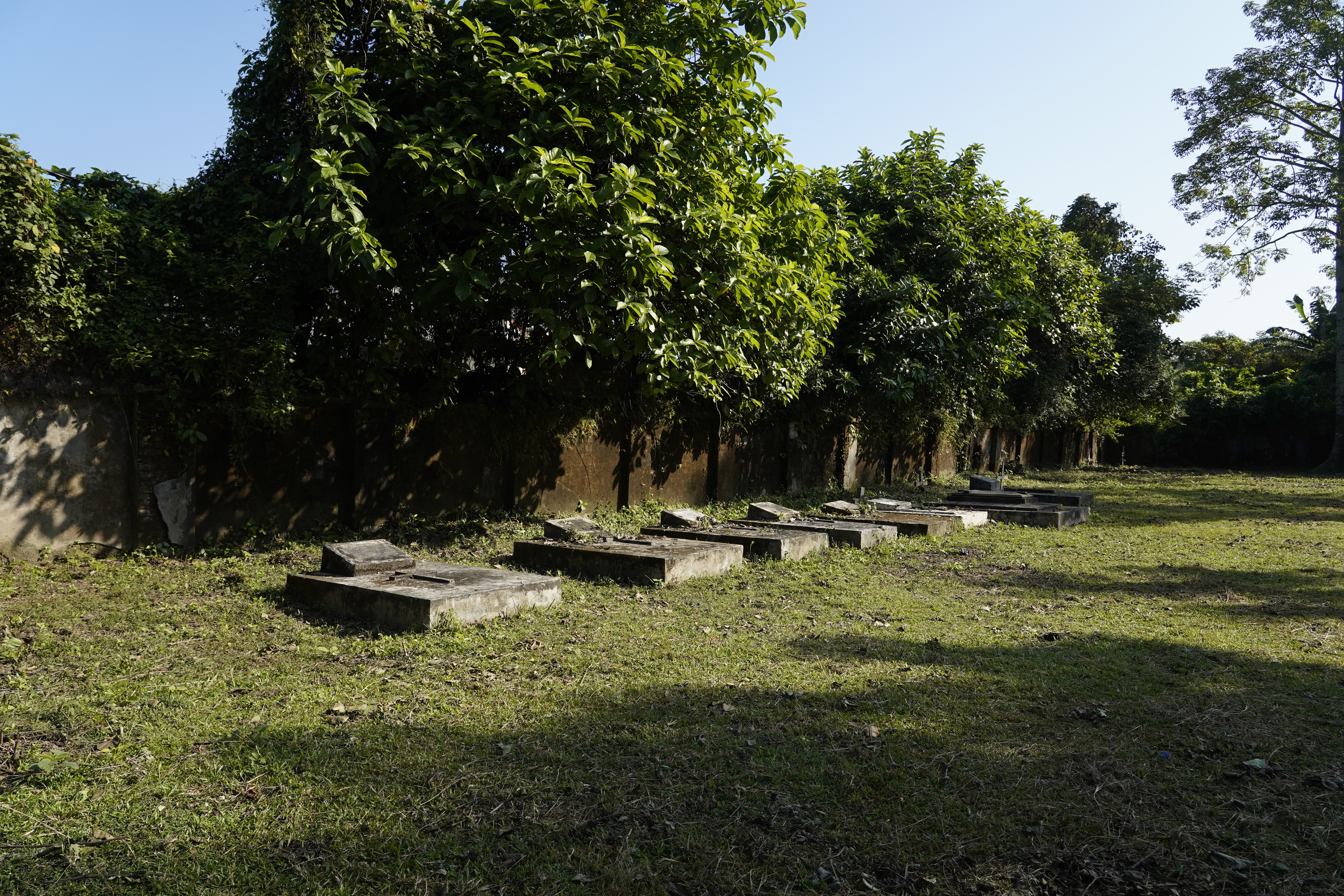
- Graves in European Cemetery
- Interactive map of European Cemetery, Cooch Behar

Details
- Location: Hangar Road, Cooch Behar,West Bengal, India
- Coordinates: 26°19′47″N 89°28′17″E
- Type: Christian
- Owned by: Northern Evangelical Lutheran Church, Cooch Bihar

European Cemetery, Cooch Behar is a protected heritage cemetery situated beside Hangar Road near the Cooch Behar Airport in Cooch Behar, in the Indian state of West Bengal. It was the burial ground of the Cooch Bihar Northern Evangelical Lutheran Church (N.E.L.C.), initially set up for European residents and Christian missionaries of the area during British India. In 2019, the West Bengal Heritage Commission declared the cemetery an official heritage site due to its historical significance.

== See also ==
- Cooch Behar Palace
- Cooch Behar State

== External link ==
- Media related to NELC Christian Burial Ground at Wikimedia Commons
