= Narendra Narayan Park =

Botanical garden in India

The Narendra Narayan Park is a botanical garden located in Cooch Behar town of West Bengal. It was established in 1894. It is named after erstwhile ruler of princely state of Cooch Behar, Shri Narendra Narayan. It was founded by Maharaja Nripendra Narayan, who named it after his father. It covers an area of 5.7 hectares including 1 hectare of water body. Its chief objectives are recreation and botanical studies.

The park campus houses the Bidhan Chandra Krishi Viswavidyalaya and the park is maintained by Forest department of West Bengal. In February 2013, a statue of Maharaja Nripendra Narayan, the founder of the park was unveiled on the occasion of his 150th birth anniversary celebrations.
