= Nripendra Narayan Memorial High School =

Coordinates: 26°18′59″N 89°39′55″E

Nripendra Narayan Memorial High School, Tufanganj
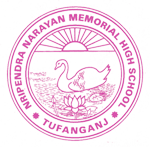
- Logo of the NNM High School

Location
- Tufanganj Main Road, Tufanganj, Cooch Behar, West Bengal, 736159

Information
- Established: 26 March 1916
- Founder: Maharaja Jitendra Narayan, the Maharaja of Cooch Behar
- School district: Cooch Behar district
- Headmaster: Dr. Ramkrishna Pramanik
- Faculty: 40
- Grades: V to XII
- Enrollment: 2000
- Colors: Navy blue Red; White
- Publication: Ushashi (School magazine)
- Affiliation: WBBSE & WBCHSE

Nripendra Narayan Memorial High School (commonly known as N.N.M. High School) is the oldest educational institution in Tufanganj subdivision. It is at the center of the town and is of historical importance regarding education in pre-independent India. The school was established in 1916 by Maharaja Jitendra Narayan, the Maharaja of Cooch Behar and is named after the late Maharaja Nripendra Narayan.

== About ==
The school is a full-fledged higher secondary school with two streams (general and vocational) in its higher secondary section. It has been working to impart education and professional training for the students to develop human resources. Admission to the secondary section is for boys only. However, the higher secondary section admits both boys and girls. With more than 5000 students, it is one of the biggest schools in Coochbehar.

NNM High School showed a consistently high success rate in Secondary and Higher Secondary examinations, often reaching 100 percent. In 2006, the school set an all-time record in the history of higher secondary examination.

== History ==
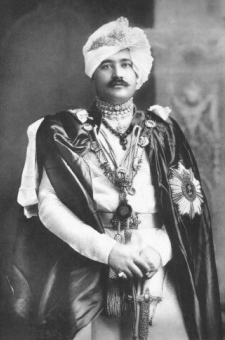
Maharaja Nripendra Narayan of Cooch Behar (1863-1911)

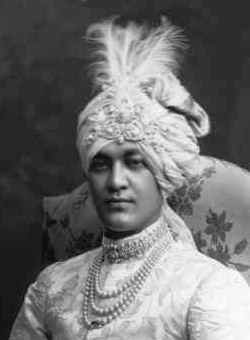
Maharaja Jitendra Narayan of Cooch Behar (1913-1922)

NNM High School was established in 1916 by the Maharaja of Cooch Behar. Despite being in the most backward area of the State of Cooch Behar, the school used to get the highest amount of financial aid from the state. The school got recognition to appear as a high school from the University of Calcutta in 1917. It was permanently recognized as a school competent to present candidates at Matriculation Examination of University of Calcutta in 1923.

In 1957, NNM High School came under the recommendation of the director of Public Instruction, West Bengal, as Higher Secondary Multipurpose School (XI) with Humanities Group and Science Group. The Higher Secondary Council granted recognition to Nripendra Narayan Memorial High School for imparting Higher Secondary Education (XI-XII) in general stream courses provisionally for two years with effect from 1 July 1976. Agriculture came as a subject in 1963. Vocational education stream (Agriculture) was introduced in 1978. This addition upholds the school as a dignified and unique institution in the district.

== Campus ==
The school is in the heart of the town. The building comprises multiple wings that house the junior section, the senior section, the library, staff rooms, the gymnasium, laboratories, the hostel etc. There are two playgrounds and an agricultural farm.

== Curriculum ==
The curriculum is based on the guidelines set by the West Bengal Board of Secondary Education and the West Bengal Council of Higher Secondary Education. The medium of instruction in the school is Bengali. At the Higher Secondary level, the school offers Science, Commerce, Arts and Vocational streams.

== Sports Activities ==
The students get training in parades, physical exercise, yoga as well as in games and sports. Football, cricket, volleyball, khoko etc. are generally played in different seasons. The Annual Athletic Meet and Prize Distribution Ceremony are regularly held in the premises in January. Students take part in inter-school tournaments, district school sports meets and state-level competition.

The school also provides NCC training facility to the students of class VII-XII.

Indian first class cricketer Shib Sankar Paul is an alumnus.

== Cultural activities ==
The school celebrates the auspicious Independence Day, the Republic Day, the birthday of Rabindranath Tagore and Netaji Subhas Chandra Bose, Saraswati Puja, Nabin Baran (freshers welcome), School Foundation Day etc.

== School uniform ==
Navy blue trouser, white shirt and black shoes for the boys and red-bordered white sari and red blouse for the girls every weekday except Thursday.

== School prayer ==
Two songs are chanted in the prayer, the first four stanza of উঠ গো ভারত-লক্ষ্মী by Atulprasad Sen followed by the National Anthem of India. Although nominally independent, Koch Bihar was a vassal state of the British Raj (1774-1949). The patriotic song by Atulprasad Sen in school prayer, therefore, suggests its involvement in the Indian independence movement.

== Student awards ==
- Dinesh Kiran Gold Medal Award
- Sibani Ghosh Award
- Abbas Uddin Award
- Nagendra Nath Mukta Mala Foundation Award
- Narendra Nath Singha Memorial Award
- Shyamali Satpati Memorial Foundation Award

== Headmasters ==
1. Upendra Nath Dasgupta, B.A. (13 June 1916 to 20 January 1920)
2. Nagendranath Chattopadhyay, B.A., B.T. (14 April 1920 to 17 May 1924)
3. Gopalchandra Chakravartti, B.A. (1 June 1924 to 29 October 1941)
4. Narendramohan Chakravartti, M.A., B.T. (1 February 1942 to 30 July 1943)
5. Prafullakumar Hor-Roy, M.A., B.T. (26 August 1943 to 9 March 1944)
6. Srishchandra Ghosh, B.A., B.T. (16 August 1944 to 31 January 1946)
7. Narendranath Chakravartti, B.A., B.T. (3 April 1946 to 1 May 1946)
8. Bankim Mukhopadhyay, B.A. (3 July 1946 to 31 March 1954)
9. Dhirendranath Basu, M.A., B.T. (13 July 1954 to 28 February 1978)^{α}
10. Sibdas Basu, M.A. (English, Bengali, History, Political science & Sanskrit), B.T., D.E.LT., L.L.B., Ph.D. (12 April 1980 to 31 August 1991)
11. Ajay Kumar Satpati, M.A. (Bengali, Sanskrit & English), B.Ed., Sahitya Shastri, Trained in Work Education, Physical Education & Social Service (23 September 1994 to 31 August 2008)
12. Ramkrishna Pramanik, M.Sc. (Mathematics), B.Ed., Ph.D. (4 November 2009 to present)

== See also ==
- Suniti Academy
- Jenkins School
