= Cooch Behar Palace =

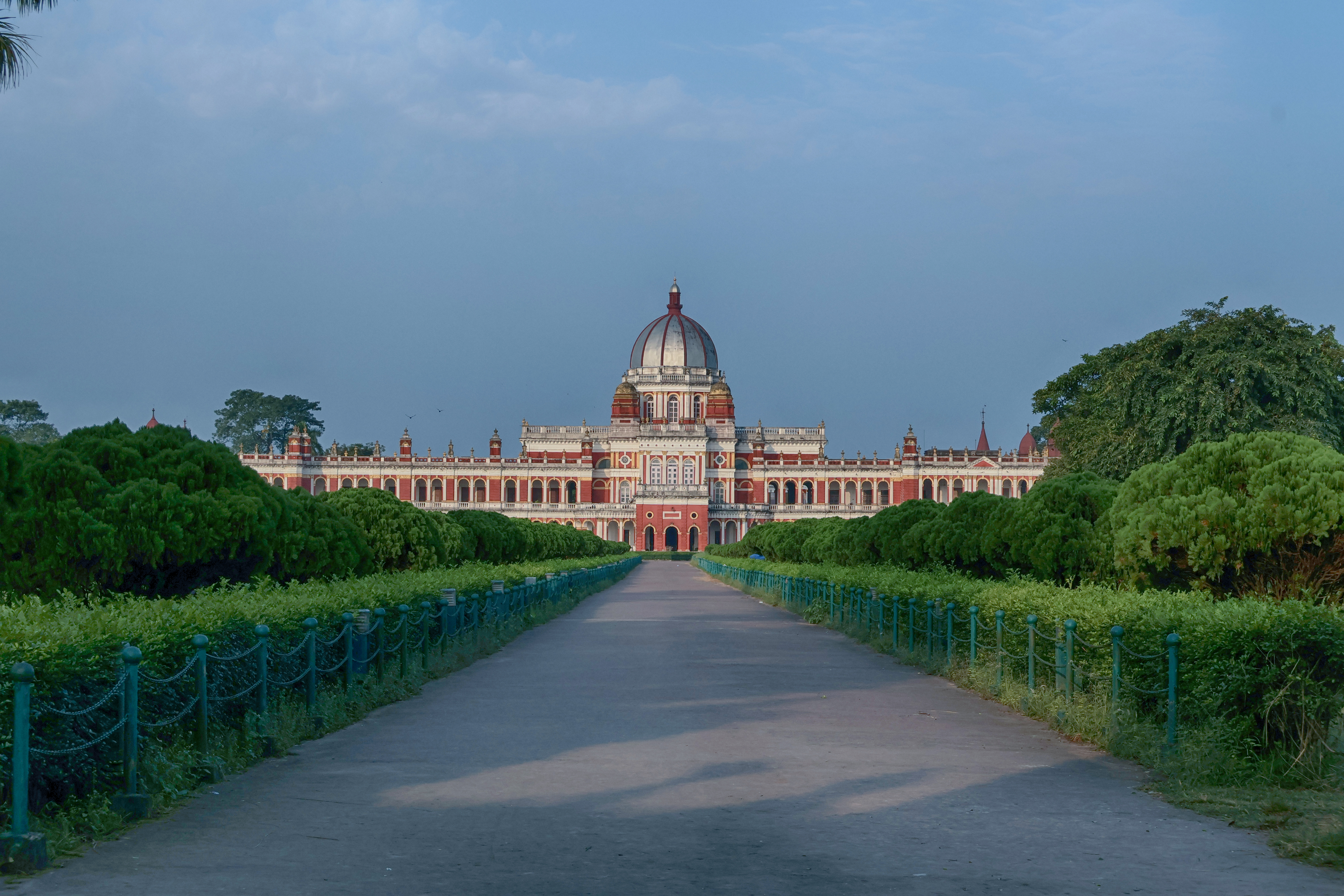
- Façade of the Cooch Behar Palace
- Interactive map of the Cooch Behar Palace area

General information
- Architectural style: Classical Western / Italian Renaissance
- Location: Cooch Behar, West Bengal, India
- Coordinates: 26°19′37″N 89°26′19″E
- Construction started: 1887; 139 years ago
- Client: Maharaja Nripendra Narayan

Cooch Behar Palace is a landmark in Cooch Behar city, West Bengal. It was designed in the Italian Renaissance architecture style and was built in 1887, during the reign of Maharaja Nripendra Narayan of the Koch dynasty. It is currently a museum.

== History ==
The Cooch Behar Palace is noted for its elegance and grandeur. It is a brick-built double-story structure in the Classical Italian architecture covering an area of 51,309 square feet (4,766.8 m^{2}). The whole structure is 395 feet (120 m) long and 296 feet (90 m) wide and is on rests 4 feet 9 inches (1.45 m) above the ground. The Palace is fronted on the ground and first floors by a series of arcaded verandahs with their piers arranged alternately in single and double rows.

At the southern and northern ends, the Palace projects slightly and in the center is a projected porch providing an entrance to the Durbar Hall. The Hall has an elegantly shaped metal dome which is topped by a cylindrical louver type ventilator. This is 124 feet (38 m) high from the ground and is in the style of the Renaissance architecture. The intros of the dome is carved in stepped patterns and Corinthian columns support the base of the cupola. This adds variegated colors and designs to the entire surface. There are various halls in the palace and rooms that include the grand Durbar Hall or the hall of audience, Drawing Rooms, Dining Hall, Billiard Room, Library, Bed Rooms, Toshakhana, Ladies Gallery and Vestibules. The artifact and precious objects that these rooms and halls used to contain are now lost.

The original palace was partially a 3 storeyed structure, but was subsequently destroyed by the 1897 Assam earthquake.

The palace shows the acceptance of European idealism of the Koch kings.

According to the List of Monuments of National Importance in West Bengal the Cooch Behar Palace is an ASI listed monument.

== Architecture ==
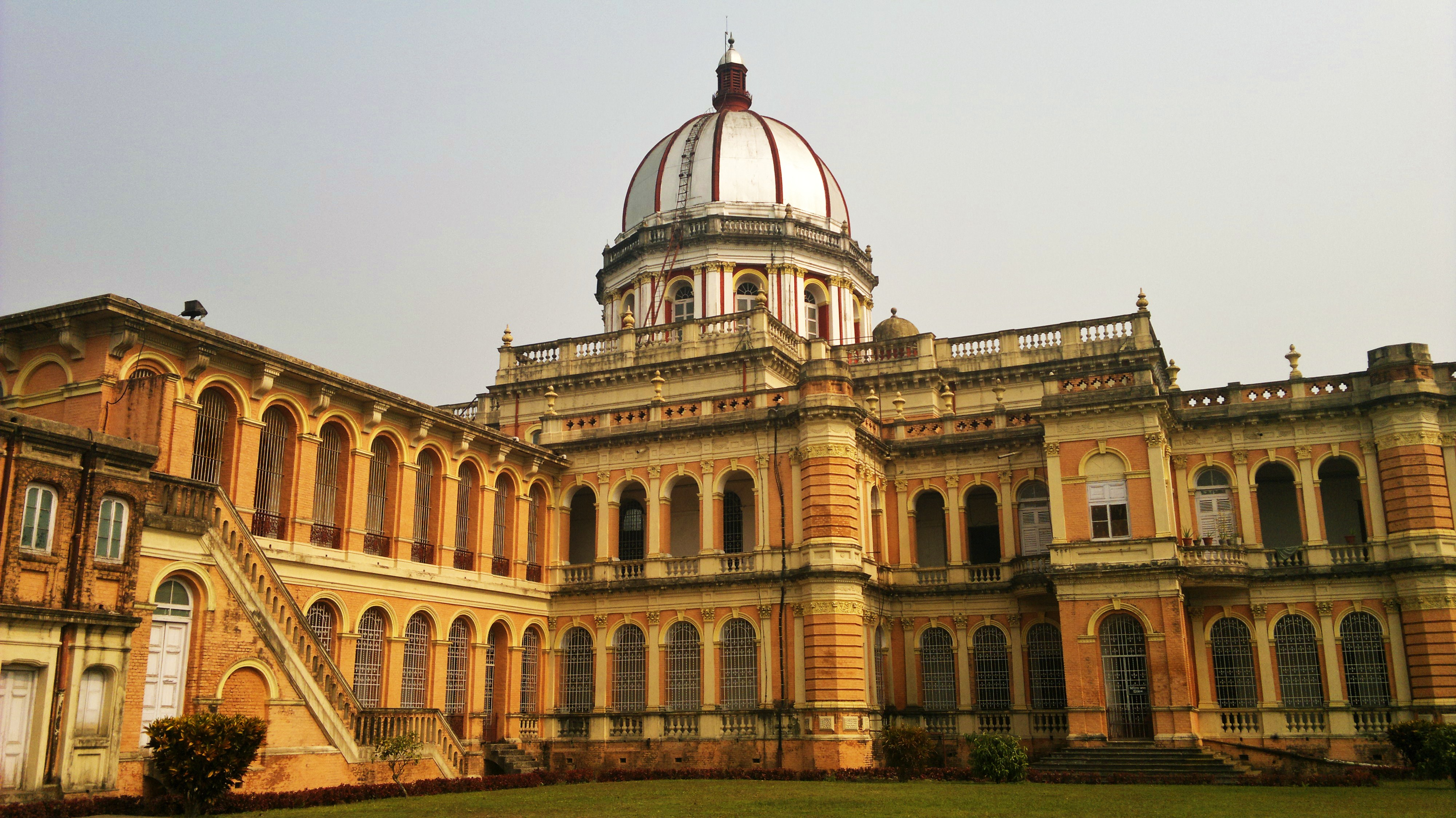
The rear side of Cooch Behar Palace, which retains the original color of the monument.

The Rajbari or the Cooch Behar Palace is a grand monument constructed in the Italian Renaissance form of architecture. The entire monument extends gracefully over an area of 51,000 square feet; about 390 feet in length and 296 feet in width; It's a brick-built structure. Standing 125 feet tall from the ground, the monument features an entrance on the ground floor, leading through a projected porch to the Durbar Hall. The first floor has a series of beautiful arcaded verandas with alternately arranged piers in double and single rows. The palace houses over 50 rooms including bedrooms, dressing rooms, billiard room, kitchen, dining hall, dancing hall, library, Tosha khana and the ladies gallery.

== Durbar Hall ==
A splendid porch positioned in the center of the monument serves as an entrance to Rajbari through the Durbar Hall. The Durbar Hall has a beautiful metal dome with a cylindrical louvre on the top that also acts as a ventilator. The dome is at 124 feet high from the ground level and is built in the traditional Italian Renaissance architecture. The dome also is beautifully carved in step pattern and rests on four arches supported by huge Corinthian columns adorned with a lantern on the top. Several small yet elegant balconies also surround the dome of the Durbar Hall.

== Gallery ==
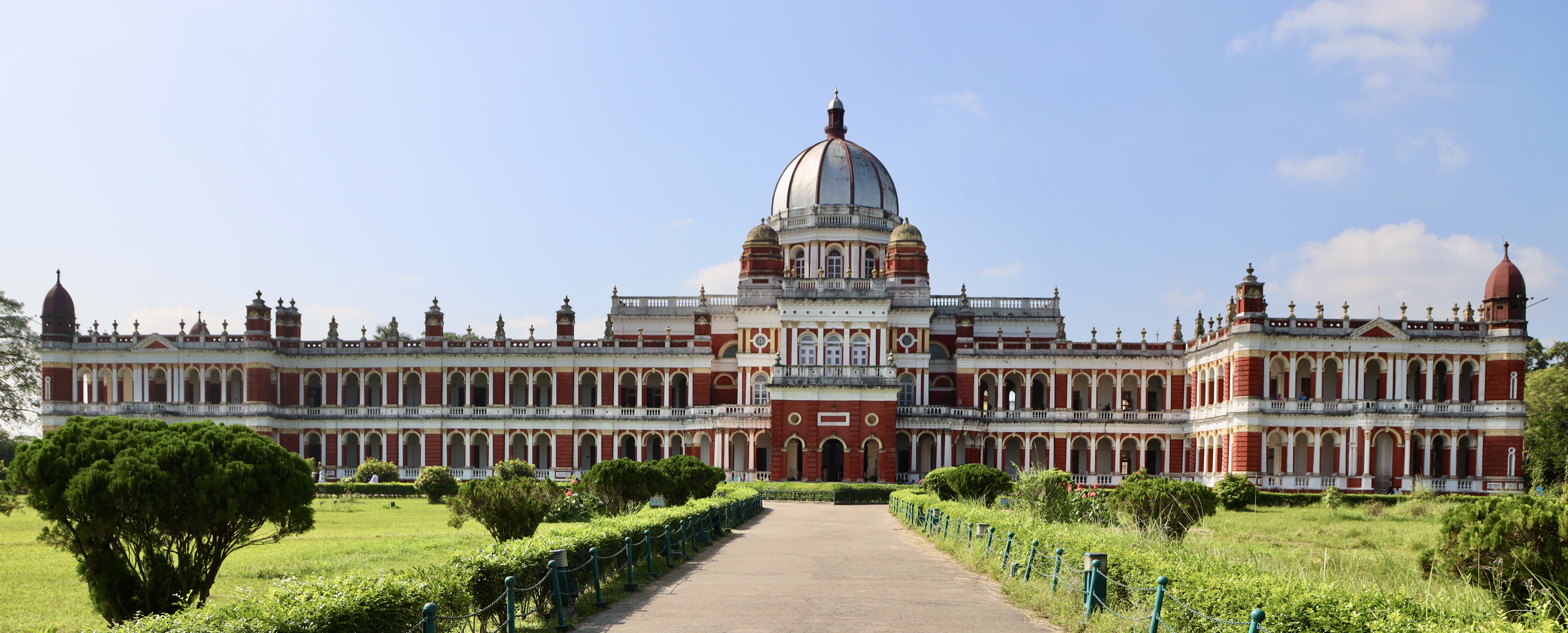

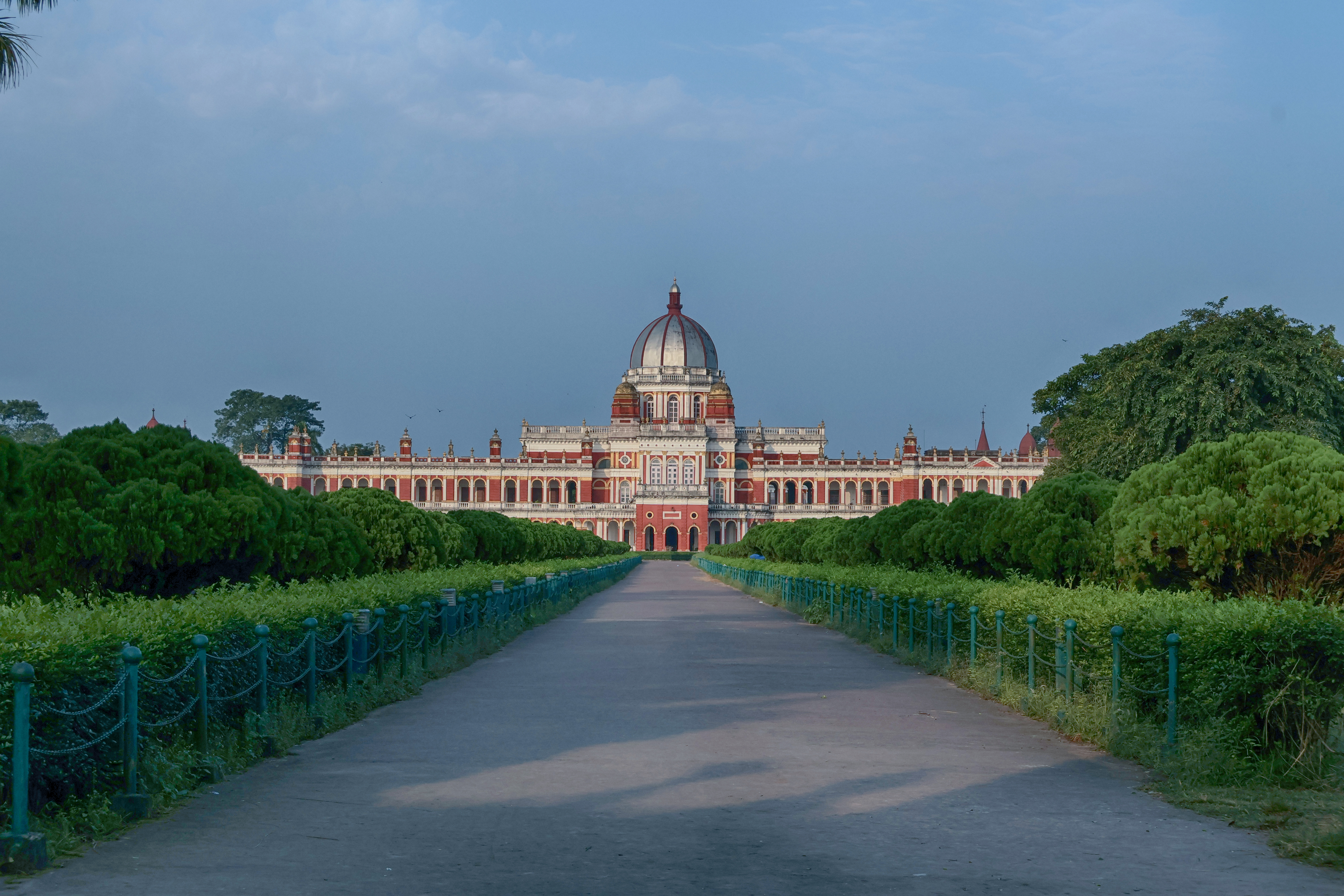
The front view of the palace

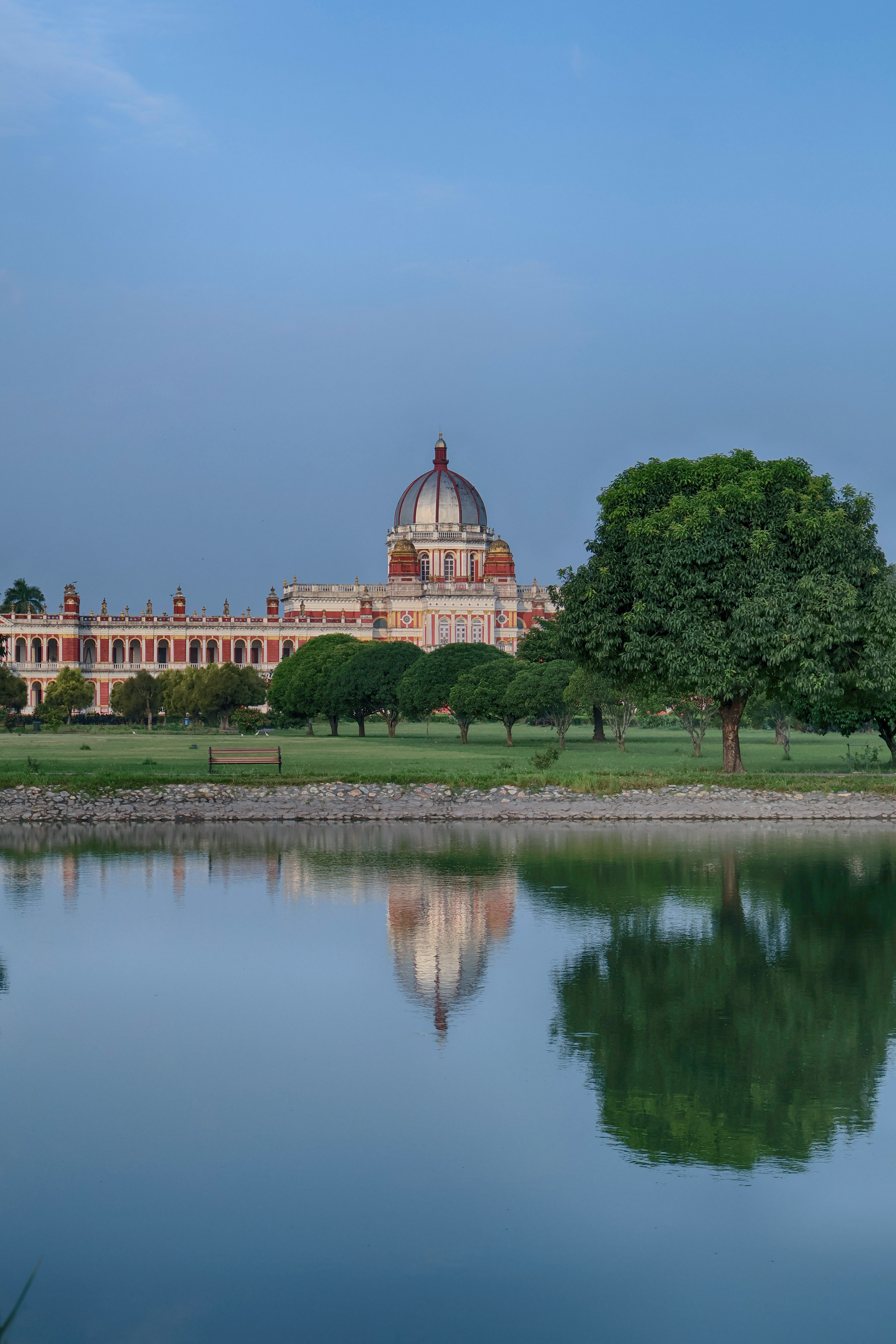
The palace and its reflection on the water body inside the compound

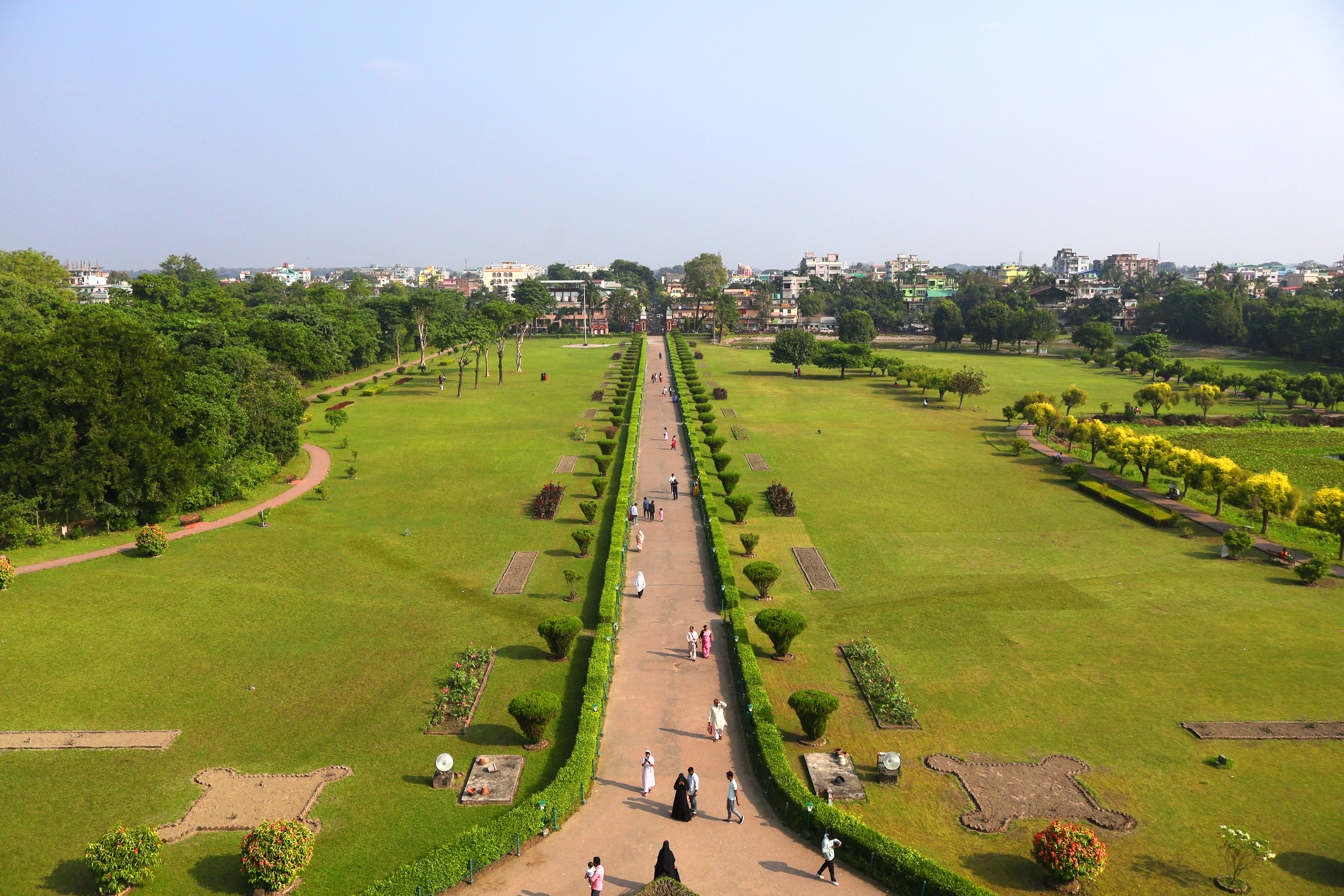
The garden of the palace

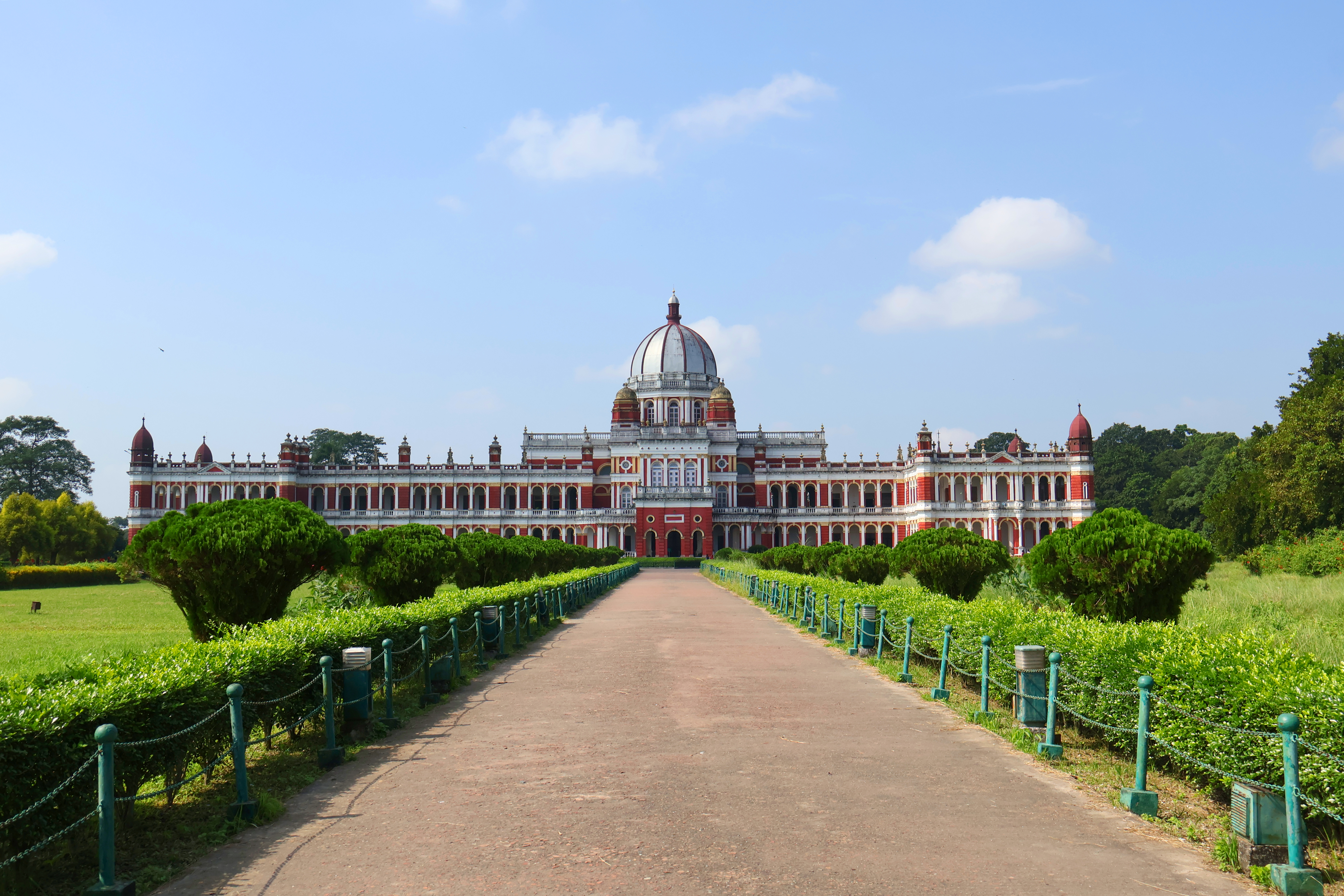
The front view of the palace

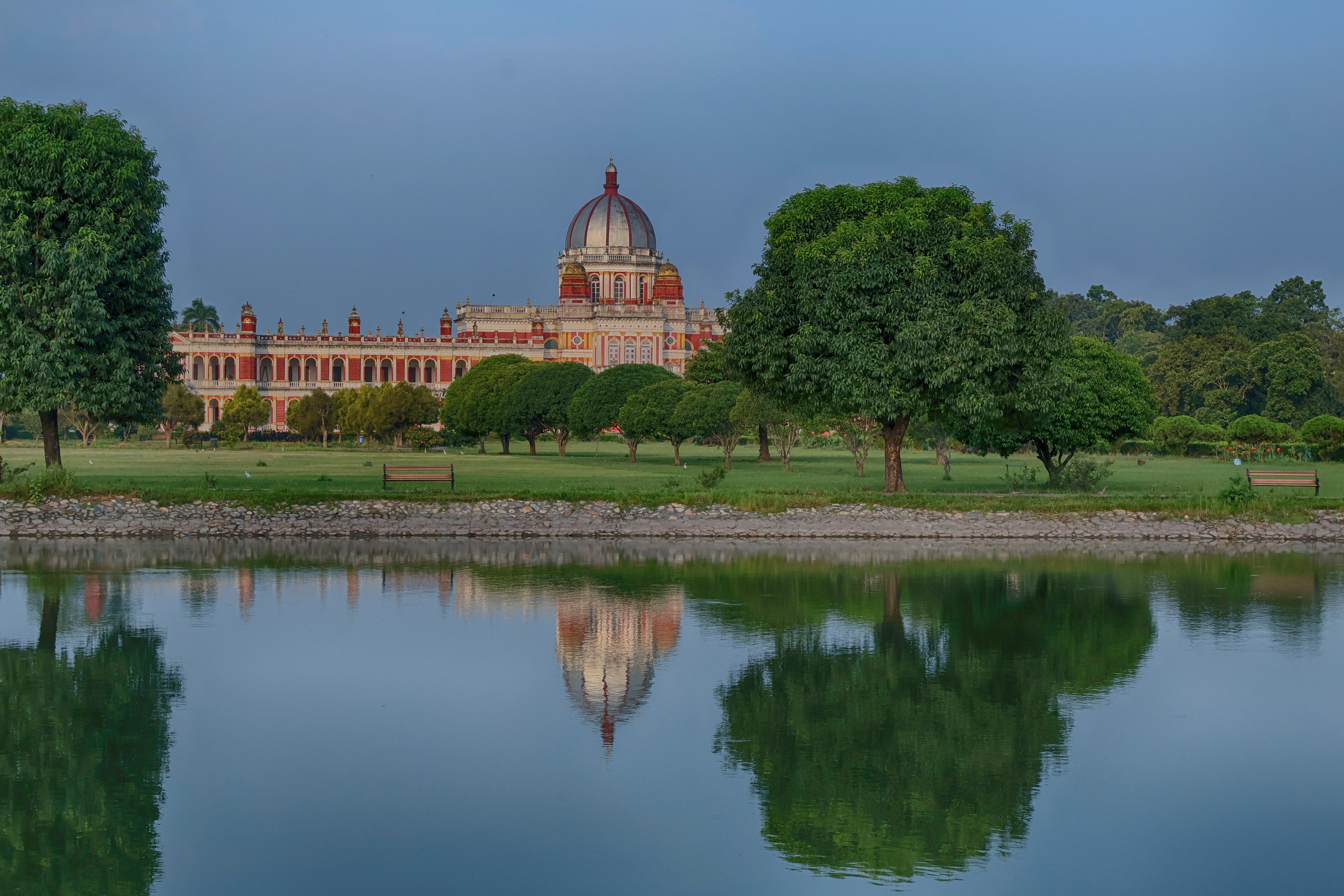
The palace and its reflection on the water body inside the compound

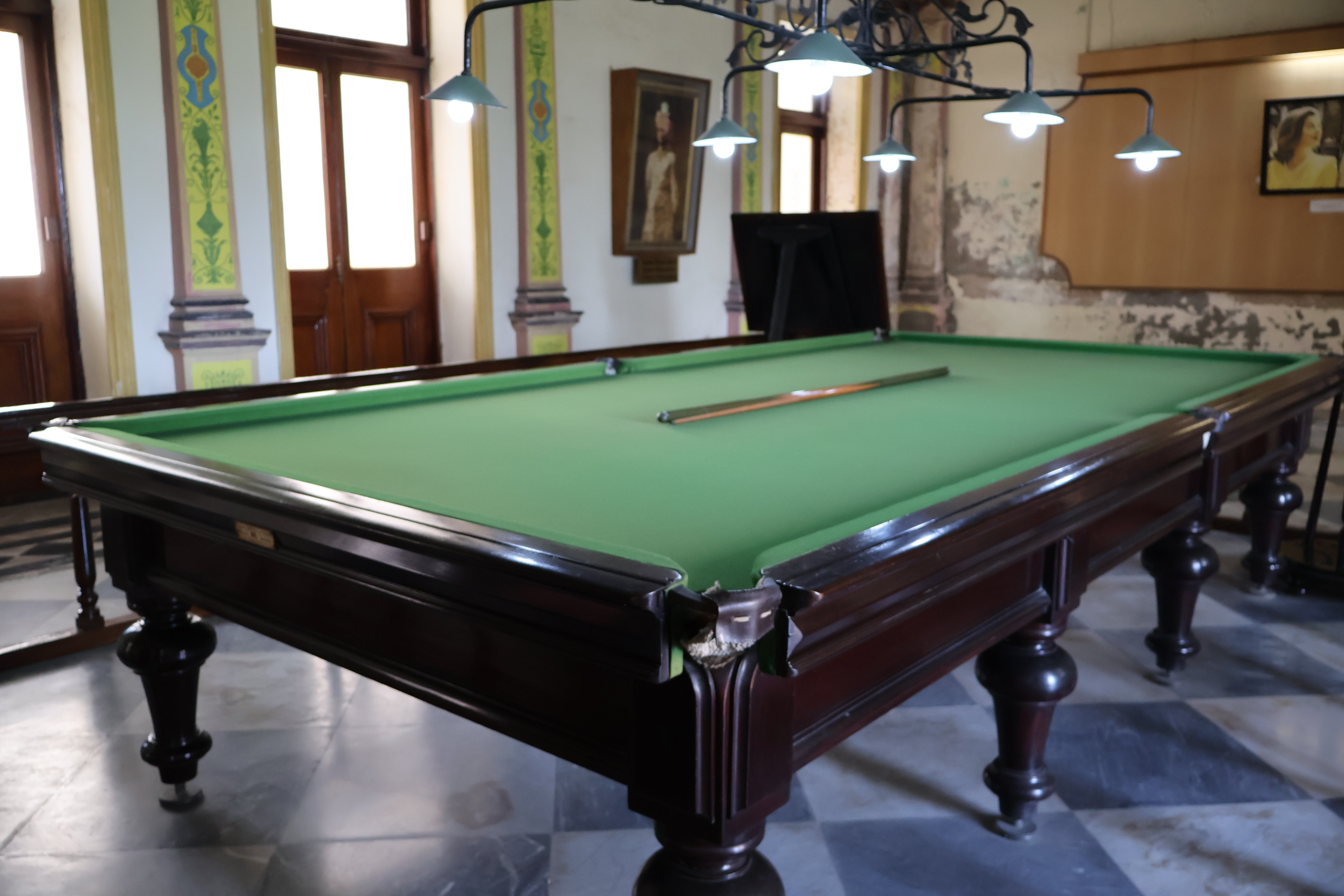
Billiard Table at Cooch Behar Palace

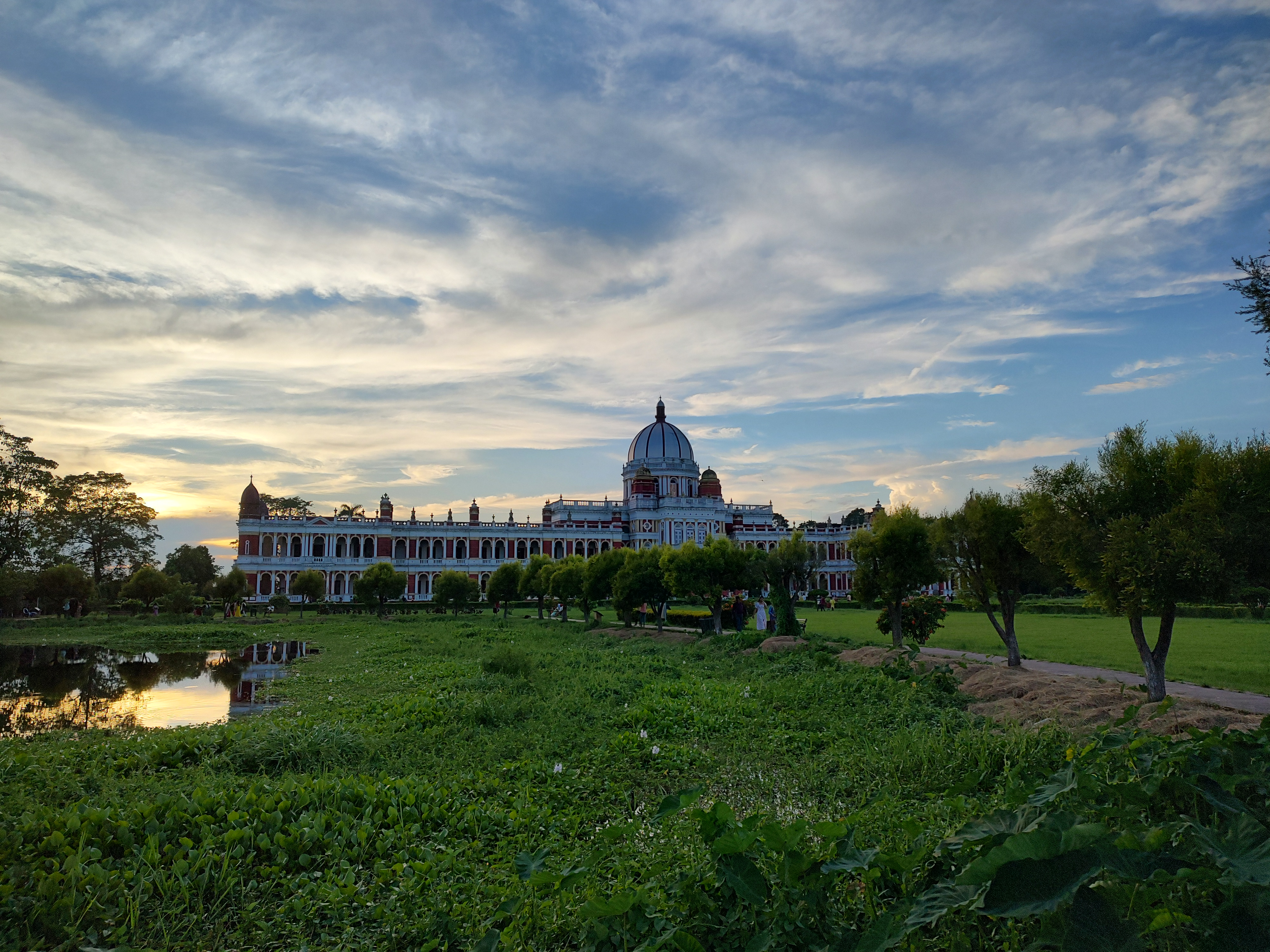
The landscape of Cooch Behar Palace

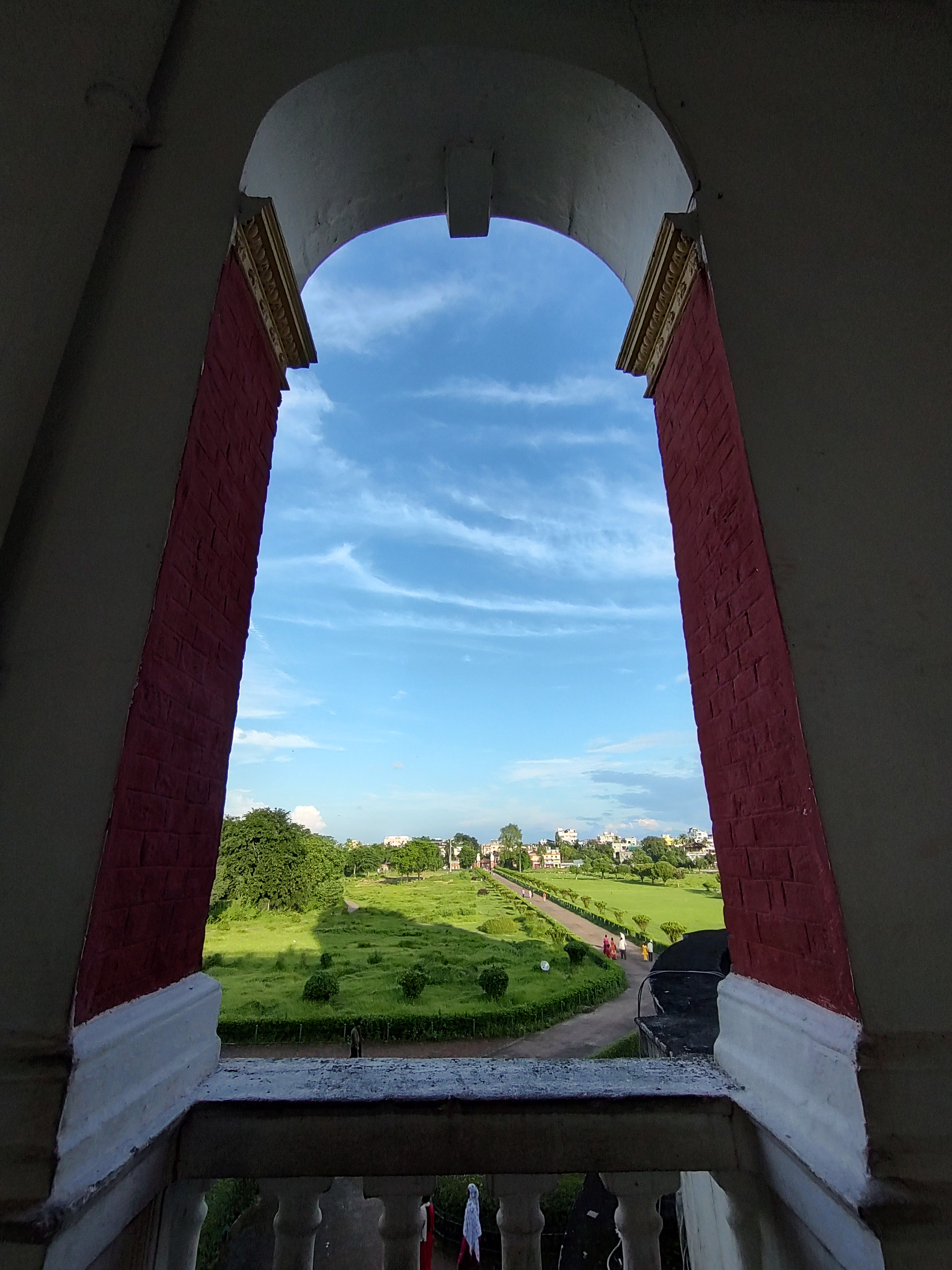
The garden of Cooch Behar Palace as seen from 1st floor

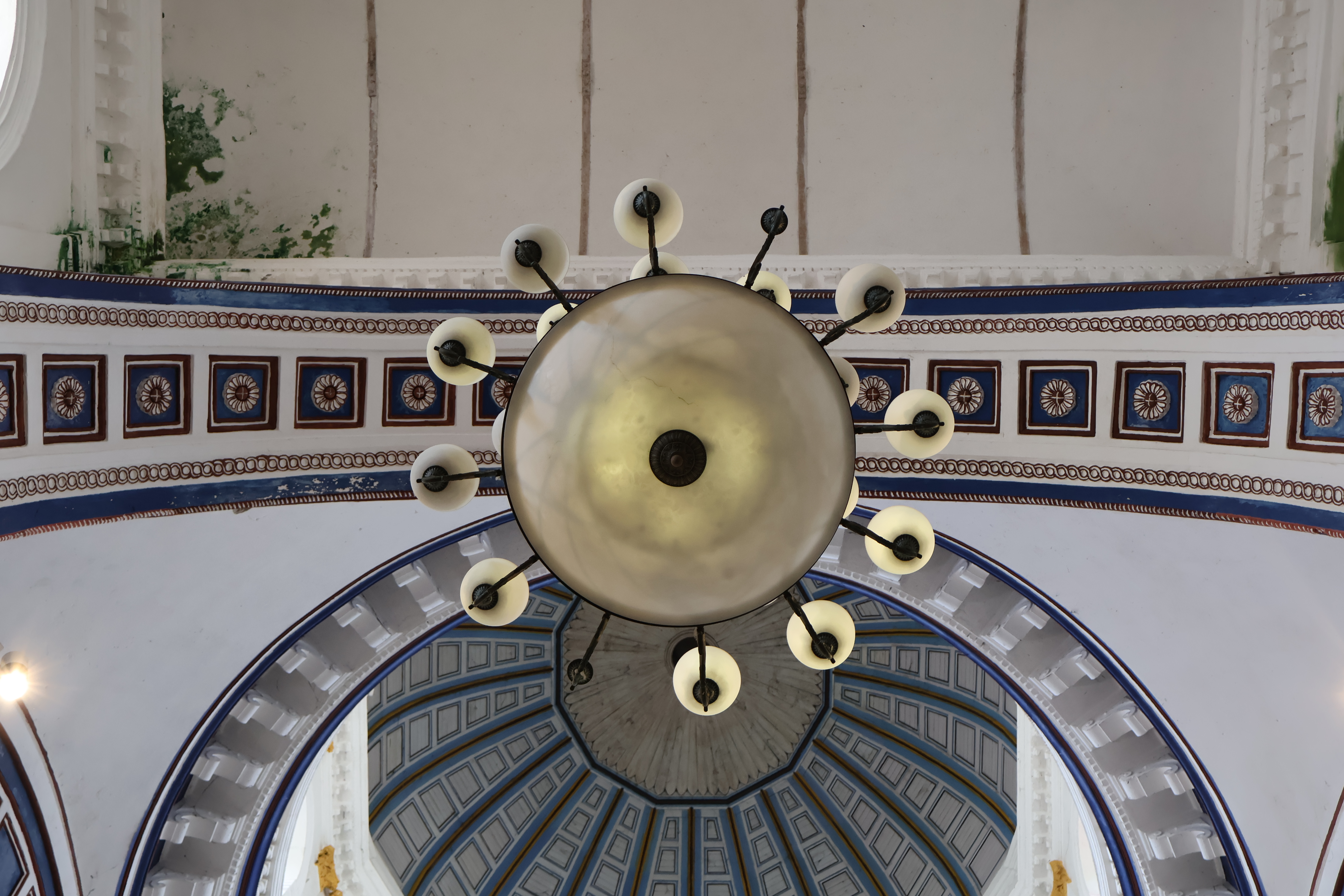
A chandelier inside the Royal Court

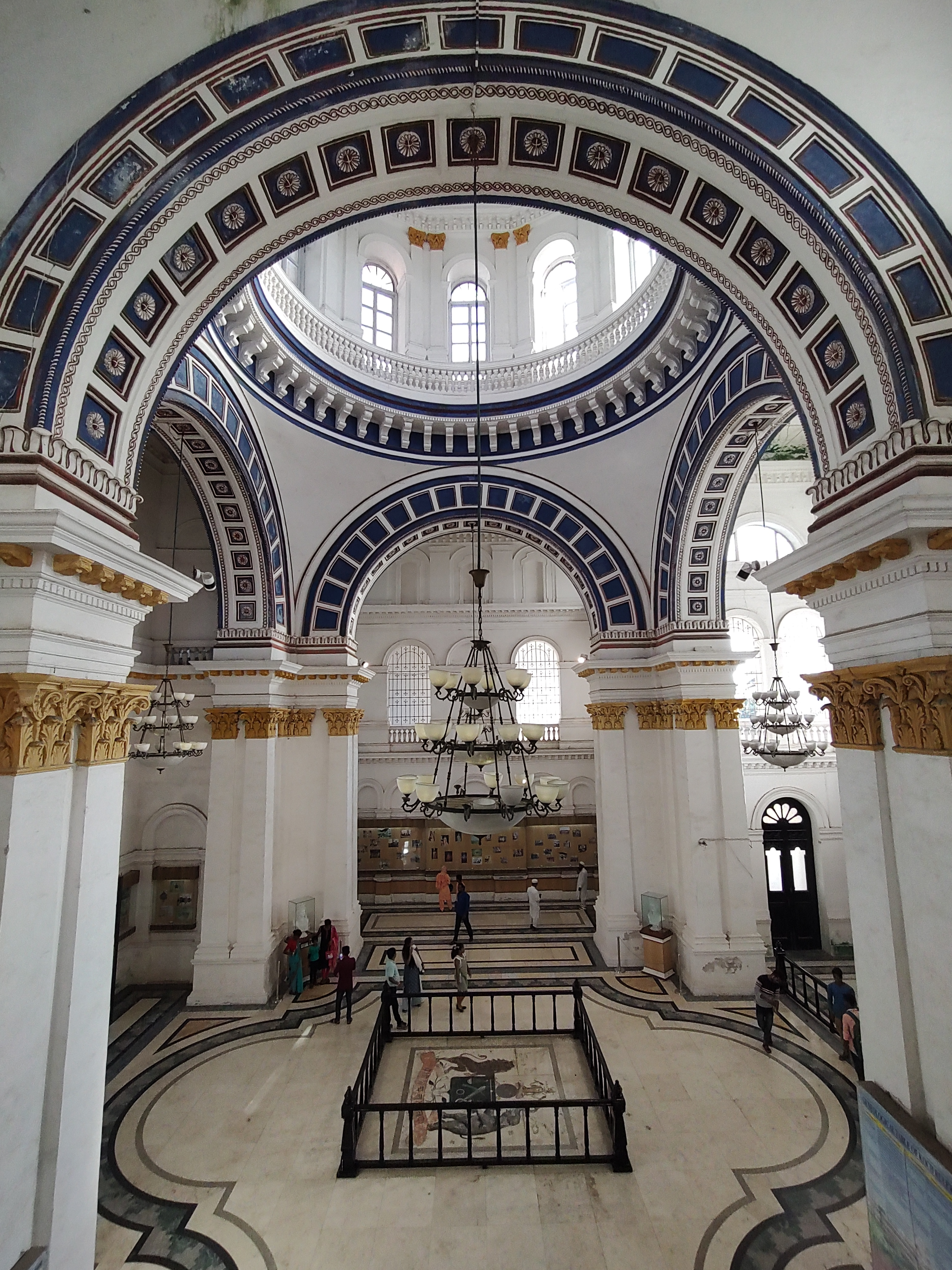
The Royal court

== See also ==
- Cooch Behar State
- Kamata Kingdom
- Koch dynasty
- Koch Hajo
- Rajbongshi people
- European Cemetery, Cooch Behar
