= Prativa Sundari Devi =

Prativa Sundari Devi Narayan
- Maharajkumari
- Born: 22 November, 1891; Lily Cottage, Calcutta, British India
- Died: 23 July, 1923 (aged 32); Calcutta, British India
- Spouse: Miles Mander (m.1912 - div.1922)
- Dynasty: Koch
- Father: Nripendra Narayan
- Mother: Suniti Devi

Prativa Sundari Devi Narayan of Cooch Bihar, also known as Princess Mander, was an Indian princess of the princely state of Cooch Behar, British India. She was born at Lily Cottage, Calcutta, on 22 November 1891, the second daughter of H.H. Sri Sri Maharaja Sir Nripendra Narayan Bhup Bahadur, Maharaja of Cooch Behar, by his wife H.H. Maharani Sunity Devee Sahiba, sometime Regent of Cooch-Behar and President of the State Council.

She married at Woodlands, Calcutta, on 21 February 1912 Miles Mander, actor, film director and author, and brother of Geoffrey Mander of Wightwick Manor; while her sister, Sudhira Sundari Devi, married the youngest brother, Alan Mander, in 1914. Prativa's marriage was without issue, and Miles petitioned for a divorce, granted on 24 May 1922. She died in Calcutta, 23 July 1923.

== See also ==
- Mander family
- Sunity Devee (1921), The Autobiography of an Indian Princess, London: J. Murray, on the Internet Archive
