= Nripendra Narayan =

Maharaja of Cooch-Behar from 1863–1911

- Maharaja of Cooch Behar; Lieutenant-Colonel; GCIE
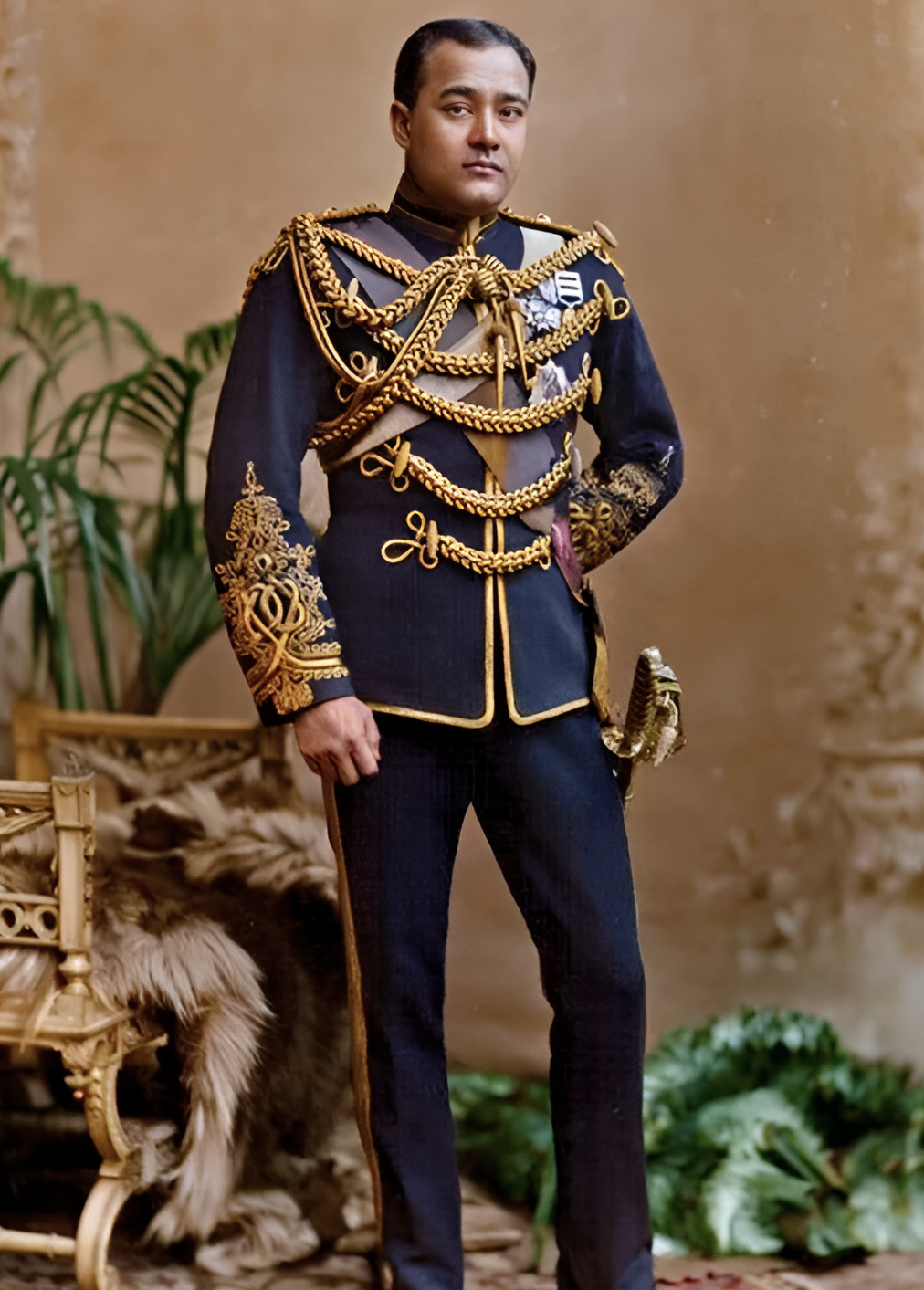

21st Maharaja of Cooch Behar
- Reign: 6 August 1862 – 18 September 1911
- Predecessor: Narendra Narayan
- Successor: Rajendra Narayan II
- Born: 4 October 1862; Cooch Behar state, Bengal, British India (now West Bengal, India)
- Died: 18 September 1911 (aged 48); Bexhill-on-Sea, England, UK
- Spouse: Suniti Devi (m. 1878–1911)
- Issue: Rajendra Narayan; Sukriti Devi; Jitendra Narayan; Victor Nityendra Narayan; Hitendra Narayan; Prativa Sundari Devi; Sudhira Sundari Devi
- Native language: Kamatapuri
- Dynasty: Koch dynasty
- Father: Narendra Narayan
- Religion: Brahmoism

His Royal Highness Lieutenant Colonel Shri Sir Nripendra Narayan Bhup Bahadur, GCIE (4 October 1863– 18 September 1911), commonly known as Maharaja Nripendra Narayan, was the ruler of the princely state of Cooch Behar in British India from 1863 until his death in 1911.

== Early life ==
Nripendra Narayan was only ten months old when his father, Narendra Narayan, died in 1863. He was crowned maharaja in the same year. Since he was still an infant, the administration was handed over to the commissioner appointed by the British Governor General. His elder brother became the Raja of Chitaranjan and Rupnarayanpur, the land of their ancestors. He studied at Wards Institute at Benaras, thereafter, at Bankipur College, Patna and lastly law at Presidency College, Calcutta. In 1878 he married Suniti Devi, a daughter of Keshab Chandra Sen of Calcutta. Immediately after marriage, he left for England for higher studies.

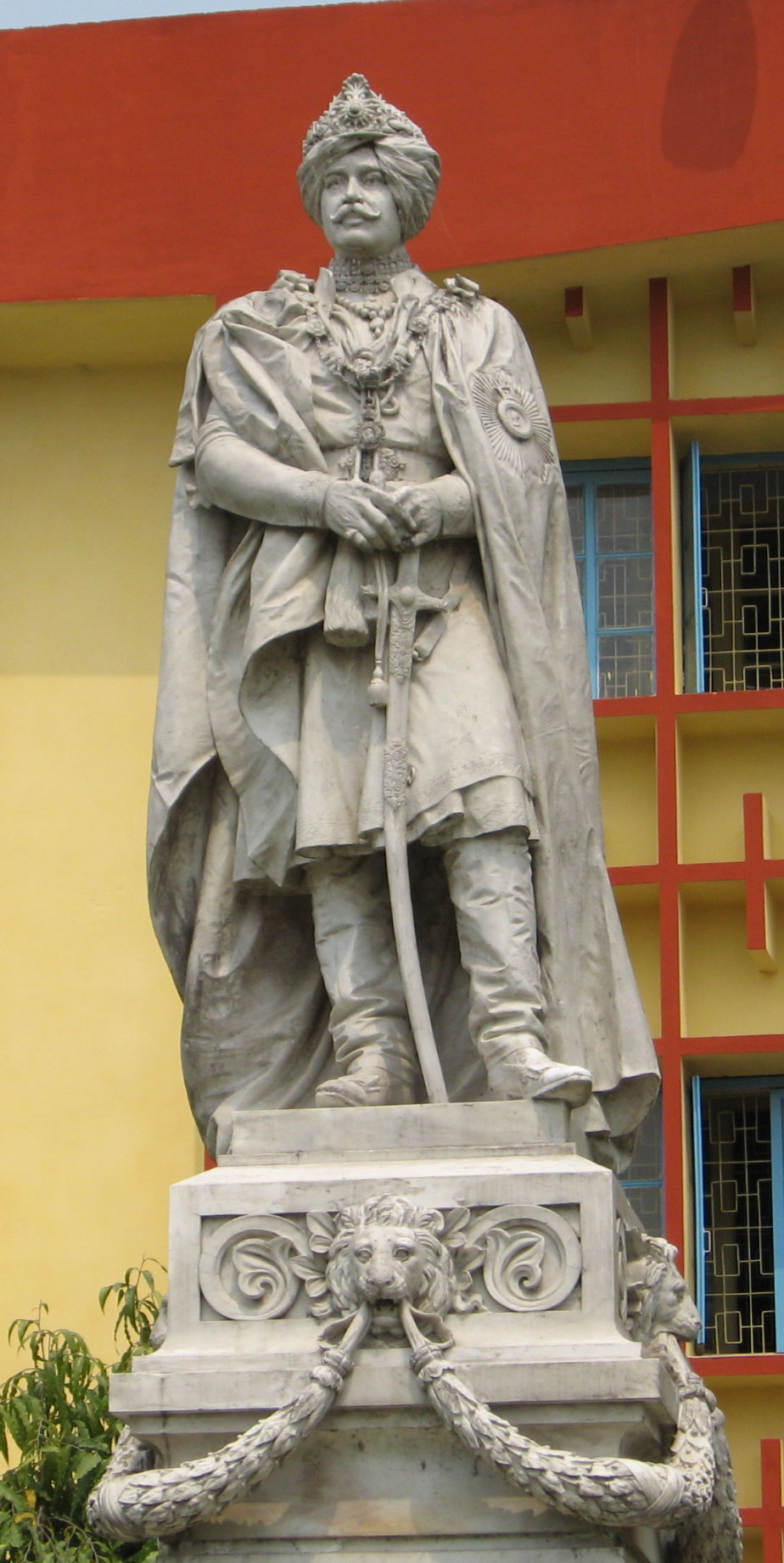
Statue of Nripendra Narayan in Cooch Behar town.

== Family ==
He was the father of four sons and three daughters: sons Rajendra Narayan (b.1882), Jitendra Narayan (b.1886), Victor Nityendra Narayan (b.1888), and Hitendra Narayan (b.1890), and daughters Sukriti Devi (b.1884), Pratibha Devi (b.1891), Sudhira Devi (b.1894).

Of his sons, Rajendra and Jitendra later became Maharajas of Cooch Behar. Gayatri Devi and Ila Devi were daughters of his son Jitendra.

His eldest daughter, Sukriti (Princess Garlie), was married to Jotsnya Nath Ghosal the nephew of the Nobel laureate poet Rabindranath Tagore. Jitendra Narayan was married to Princess Indira Devi of Baroda. His second daughter Prativa Sundari Devi married English actor, film director and author Miles Mander in 1912.

His third daughter Sudhira Sundari Devi married in 1914 Alan Mander, brother of Miles.

== Death ==
Nripendra died at the English coastal resort of Bexhill-on-Sea in September 1911. His funeral took place in Bexhill on 21 September 1911. The Maharajah had come to Bexhill to convalesce after leaving Moor Hall, Ninfield. One of his daughters had recently drowned. A memorial drinking fountain dedicated to Nripendra was opened by his second son, Maharaja Kumar Jitendra on 18 September 1913 (jitendra had just succeeded to the throne of Cooch Behar after the death of his older brother Rajendra). The fountain originally stood to the side of the Coastguards Cottages on the present site of the De La Warr Pavilion. When the cottages were demolished in 1934 to make way for the Pavilion, the fountain was re-erected in Egerton Park. It stood near to the park entrance next to the Bexhill Museum until 1963, when it was removed for restoration. It was stored in Bexhill Cemetery for a while but then subsequently disappeared. Its current whereabouts is unknown.

== Work ==
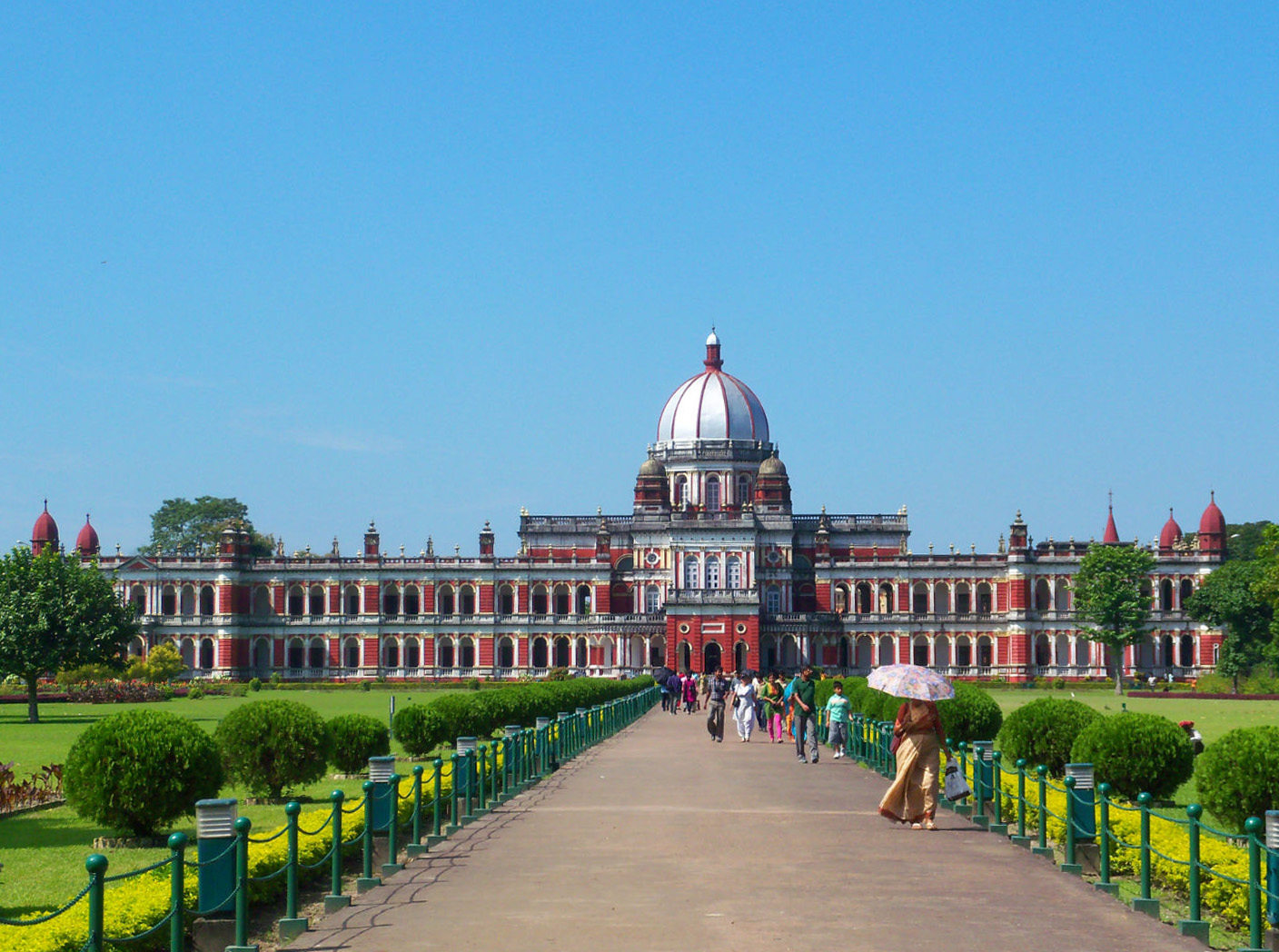
Façade of the Cooch Behar Palace

He banned the practice of slave-keeping (Kritadas Pratha) in his State by introducing a law in 1884. In the year 1888, for the betterment of higher studies in his own state, he established the Victoria College now known as A.B.N. Seal College. Further, in the name of his queen, Suniti Devi, he set up a girls school called Suniti College in 1881 which was later named Suniti Academy. In 1883 he constructed the Nripendra Narayan Hall in Jalpaiguri city and in 1887 granted land for the construction of the Lowis Jubilee Sanitarium in Darjeeling. He also established the India Club at Calcutta in 1882. He also established the Anandamayi Dharmasala for distribution of free foods for poor at Cooch Behar in 1889. He founded in Cooch Behar, the botanical garden – Narendra Narayan Park in 1892. He was also the first president of Calcutta Club founded in 1907.

Maharaja was an enthusiast of cricket and promoted Cooch Behar's team. He would invite top players from all over the world. He had a cricket ground at his palace in Cooch Behar and also promoted one ground at Alipore in Calcutta. His team and team of Maharaja of Natore were rivals in Bengal. He was also an enthusiast of football in Bengal and was one of the supporters of Mohun Bagan.

== Honours ==
- Empress of India Medal Gold-1877 with a Sword.
- Knight Grand Commander of the Order of the Indian Empire (GCIE): 1887
- Queen Victoria Golden Jubilee Medal: 1887
- Queen Victoria Diamond Jubilee Medal Clasp: 1897
- Delhi Durbar Gold Medal: 1903

== Memorials ==
The Nripendra Narayan Memorial High School was founded in 1916 by his son, Maharaja Jitendra Narayan, in his memory.

The Bexhill-on-Sea Historical Society published a booklet titled Bexhill’s Maharajah, outlining his connections to the town.

== See also ==
- List of famous big game hunters

== Notes ==
Political offices
Preceded by Maharaja Narendra Narayan Bhup Bahadur	Maharaja of Cooch Behar; 1863–1911	Succeeded by Maharaja Rajendra Narayan II
