= Rajendra Narayan =

Maharaja of Cooch-Behar from 1911–1913

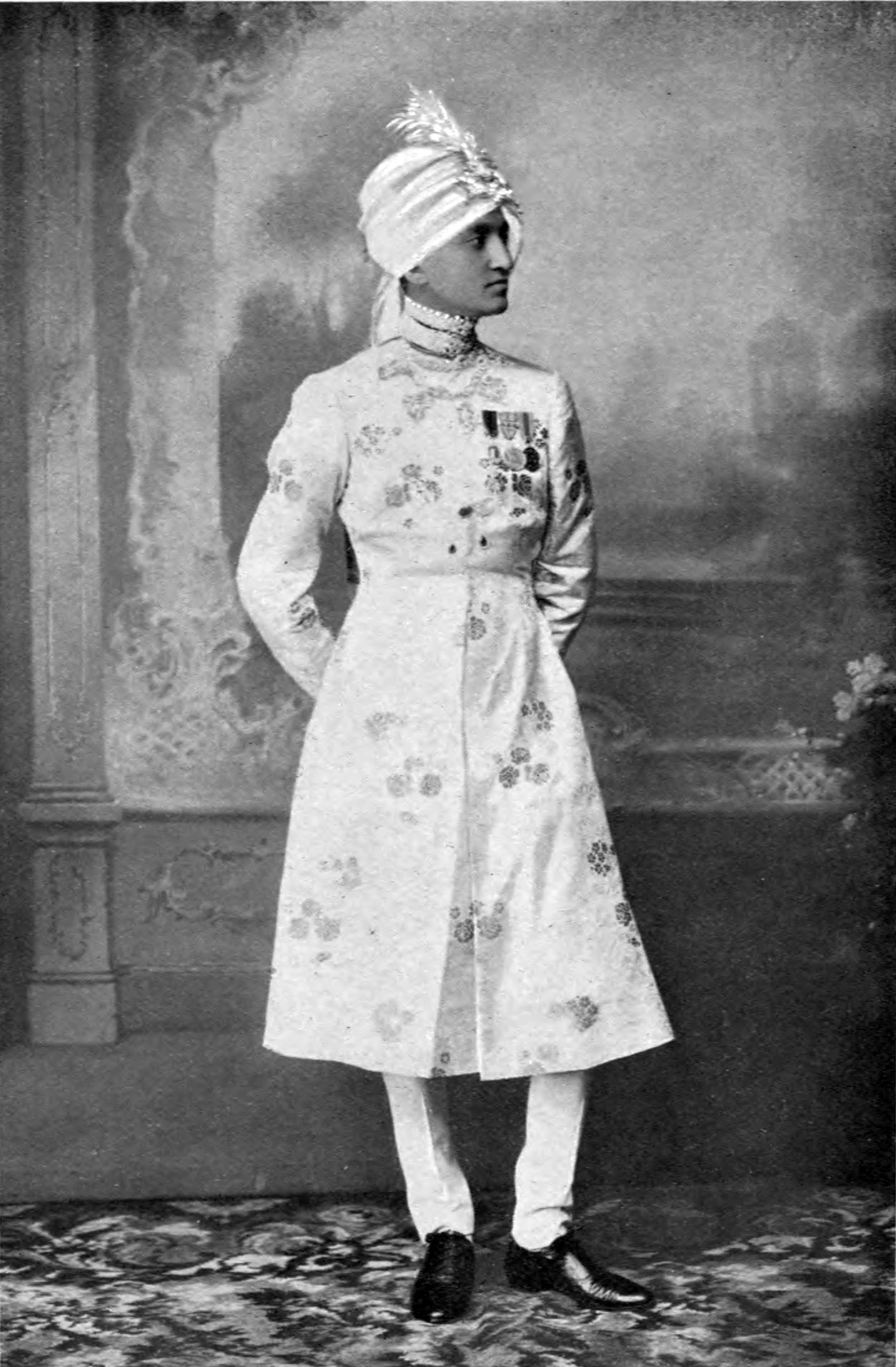
Raj Rajendra Narayan in 1912

Raja Rajendra Narayan Bhup Bahadur (1882–1913), eldest son of Nripendra Narayan, was Maharaja of Cooch Behar, West Bengal, India.

== Education ==
Raj Rajendra Narayan was born in a Kulin Kayastha Family at Woodsland Palace of Calcutta on 11 April 1882. At the age of 12, Raj Rajendra Narayan was sent to England for studying. In 1900 he entered Oxford University where he played Polo with the Oxford University polo team. After having completed his studies at Oxford, Raj Rajendra Narayan returned to India and helped his father in carrying out state proceedings, but also received military training at "Caded Core". However, during his stay in England, Raj Rajendra Narayan got a chest-injury while playing polo and from then on he felt acute pain in his chest. That turned out to be the cause of a type of depression for him because of which he didn't get married.

He received the honorary rank of Lieutenant in the British Army on 4 June 1902.

== Reign ==
After the death of his father Raj Rajendra Narayan, he ascended the throne as the 22nd Maharaja of Cooch Behar in 1911. He participated in the religion of the Brahma, but was known to rule without being partial to any side, which gained him respect.

== Death ==
When his illness progressed dramatically Rajendra Narayan visited London for medical treatment under Dr. Rijin Russel. While his illness deteriorated further, he expressed his desire to die at Cooch Behar itself, but died in London at midnight on 1 September 1913. His ashes were brought back and buried at Cooch Behar. Since Raj Rajendra Narayan died leaving no descendants, Jitendra Narayan ascended the throne of Cooch Behar in 1913.

Political offices
Preceded by Maharaja Nripendra Narayan Bhup Bahadur	Maharaja of Cooch Behar; 1911–1913	Succeeded by Maharaja Jitendra Narayan Bhup Bahadur
