= Jenkins School =

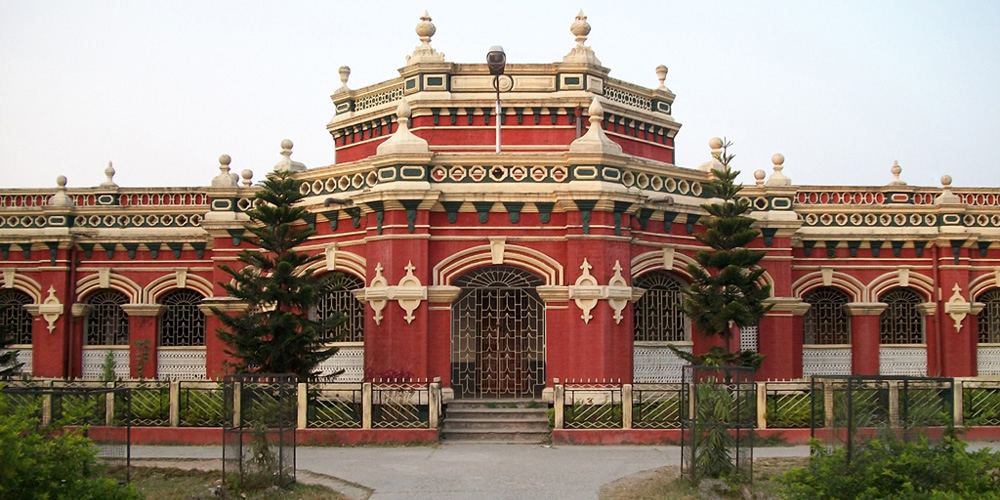

Location
- Silver Jubilee Avenue; Cooch Behar; West Bengal, 736101; India
- Coordinates: 26.3201513°N 89.4471541°E

Information
- Type: Government school
- Motto: 'Shraddhavan Labhate Gyanam! (Wisdom is achieved by tribute)'
- Established: 1861; 165 years ago
- Founder: Narendra Narayan, Maharaja of Cooch Behar
- Faculty: 43
- Gender: Male
- Enrollment: 1400
- Language: Bengali, English
- Colors: White and olive green
- Affiliation: WBBSE and WBCHSE
- Alumni Association: JSAA
- Website: coochbehar.gov.in/JenkinsSchool.html

Jenkins School is a boys school in the Indian state of West Bengal. It was established in 1861 in the town of Cooch Behar.

== History ==
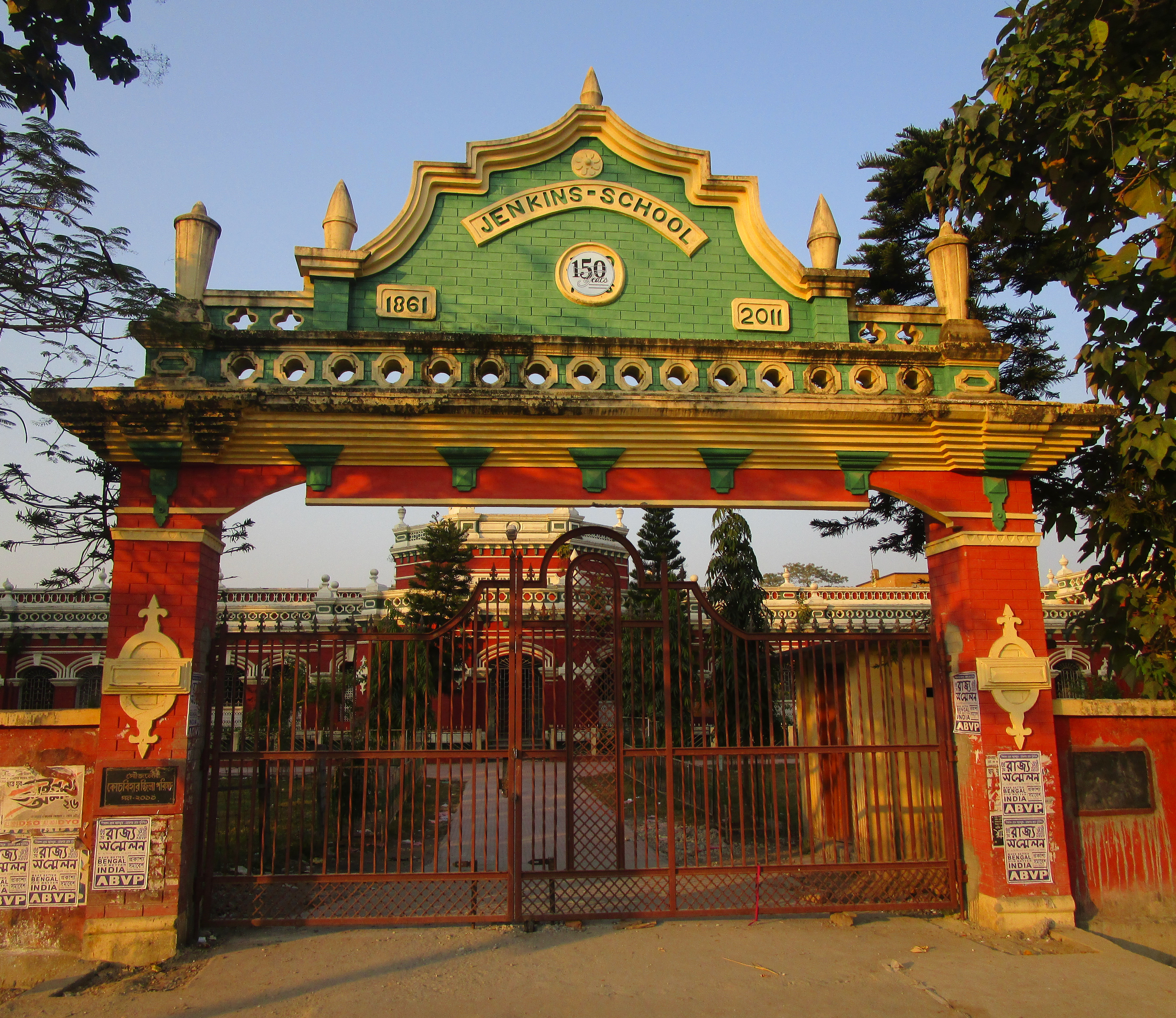
Jenkins School gate

After the independence of India in 1947 the princely state of Cooch Behar became the Cooch Behar district of West Bengal in 1950, and Jenkins School became one of the state government schools. The school was under the patronage of the then Maharaja (king) of Cooch Behar, Jagaddipendra Narayan and the government of West Bengal.

== Notable alumni ==
- Abbasuddin Ahmed, singer
- Maziruddin Ahmed, Cooch Behar politician
- Mustafa Kamal, former Chief Justice of Bangladesh and Chairman of Law Commission
- Tulsi Lahiri, Bengali actor, director and play writer

== See also ==
- Education in India
- List of schools in India
- Education in West Bengal
