= Keshub Chandra Sen =

Indian academic (1838–1884)

Keshab Chandra Sen
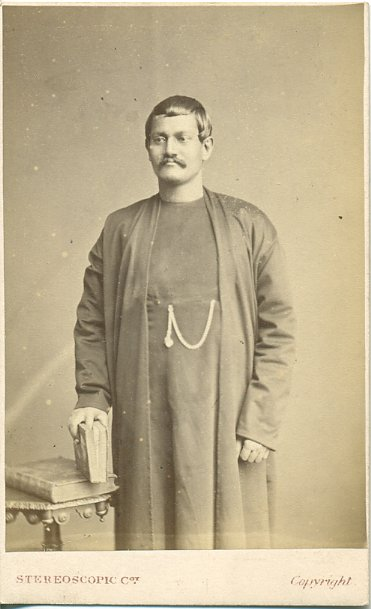
- Keshub Chandra Sen, c. 1870
- Born: 19 November 1838; Calcutta, Bengal Presidency, British India (present-day Kolkata, West Bengal, India)
- Died: 8 January 1884 (aged 45); Calcutta, Bengal Presidency, British India
- Occupation: Religious reformer
- Organization: Brahmo Samaj
- Movement: Bengal Renaissance
- Spouse: Jaganmohini Devi
- Children: 10 including Suniti Devi, Sucharu Devi
- Relatives: Naina Devi, Sadhana Bose (grand-daughters), Rudrani Dhar (adopted)

Keshub Chandra Sen (Bengali: কেশবচন্দ্র সেন; also spelled Keshab Chunder Sen; 19 November 1838 – 8 January 1884) was an Indian philosopher and social reformer who attempted to incorporate Christian theology within the framework of Hindu thought. Born a Hindu in the Bengal Presidency of British India, he became a member of the Brahmo Samaj in 1857 but established his own breakaway "Bharatvarshiya Brahmo Samaj" in 1866 while the Brahmo Samaj remained under the leadership of Debendranath Tagore (who headed the Brahmo Samaj until his death in 1905). In 1878, his followers abandoned him after the underage child marriage of his daughter which exposed his campaign against child marriage as hollow.

== Early life and education ==
Keshub Chandra Sen was born on 19 November 1838 into an affluent Bengali Baidya family of Calcutta (now Kolkata). His family originally belonged to Garifa village on the banks of the river Hooghly near Naihati. His grandfather was Ramkamal Sen (1783–1844), a well-known pro-sati Hindu activist and lifelong opponent of Ram Mohan Roy. His father Peary Mohan Sen died when he was only ten years, and Sen was brought up to his uncle. As a boy, he attended the Bengali Pathshala elementary school and later attended Hindu College in 1845.

== Career ==
In 1855 he established an evening school for the children of working men, which continued upto 1858. In 1855, he became Secretary to the Goodwill Fraternity, a Masonic lodge associated with the Unitarian Rev. Charles Dall and a Christian missionary Rev. James Long who also helped Sen establish a "British Indian Association" in the same year. Around this time he began to be attracted to the ideas of the Brahmo Samaj.

Keshub Sen was also briefly recruited as Secretary of the Asiatic Society in 1854. For a short time thereafter Sen was also a clerk in the Bank of Bengal, but resigned his post to devote himself exclusively to literature and philosophy. On this, Professor Oman who knew him well writes, "Endowed with an emotional temperament, earnest piety, a gift of ready speech and a strong leaven of vanity, Keshub Chunder Sen found the sober, monotonous duties of a bank clerk intolerable, and very soon sought a more congenial field for the exercise of his abilities." and he formally joined the Brahma Samaj in 1859.

== Brahmo Samaj ==
In 1858, left his home in Colootola and took refuge in the Jorasanko House of the Tagore family when the patriarch of the family was then away. In 1862 Sen helped found the Albert College and wrote articles for the Indian Mirror, a weekly journal of the Calcutta Brahmo Samaj in which social and moral subjects were debated.

In 1863 he wrote The Brahma Samaj Vindicated. He strongly opposed to Christianity and travelled about the country lecturing and preaching that the Brahmo Samaj was intended to revitalise Hindu religion through use of ancient Hindu sources and the authority of the Vedas. By 1865, however, Sen was convinced that only Christian doctrine could bring new life to Hindu society.

In November 1865 he was caused to leave the Brahma Samaj after "an open break with its founder Debendranath Tagore" over Christian practices in Brahmoism, and the next year (1866) with encouragement of the Unitarian preacher Charles Dall he joined another new organisation, Bharatvarshiya Brahmo Samaj, as its Secretary (President being "God"). Tagore's Brahmo Samaj then quickly purged itself of Sen's Christian teaching, and encouraged being described as Adi Brahmo Samaj to distinguish it from Sen's deliberately eponymous version.

== Christianity ==
In 1866 Sen delivered an address on "Jesus Christ, Europe and Asia", in which he proclaimed that "India would be for Christ alone who already stalks the land", and which fostered the impression that he was about to embrace Christianity.

Professor Oman writes "From the time of his secession from the parent Society, Keshub by his writings and public lectures enlisted the sympathies of the Viceroy, Sir John Lawrence, who took a deep interest in the work of the native reformer, particularly as Keshub had spoken publicly of Christ in terms which seemed to justify the belief that he was Christian in all but open profession of the faith."

This drew attention to him and in 1870 he journeyed to England where he remained for six months. The reception in England disappointed him.

=== Love for Sovereign ===
In 1870 Keshub introduced a new doctrine into his Church "Love for the Sovereign". Perceiving Christianity as a model tradition from which the Indians could learn, Keshub became convinced that the British presence in India served a divine purpose for the Indian people. At his historic 1870 meeting with Queen Victoria he expressed his positive attitude towards British rule, which gained him plaudits from his audience. This theological stand against Indian nationalism (then being propounded by the Brahmos under Hemendranath Tagore's new doctrine of "Brahmos embrace the co-existence of Brahmo principles with governance, but oppose all governance in conflict with Brahmo principles.") made Keshub the target of tremendous criticism at home.

=== Discord within the Brahmo Samaj of India ===
The passage of the Special Marriages Act in 1872, caused great resentment among Brahmos that Sen had caused an inherent break with the Brahmo Dharma compiled by Maharshi Debendranath Tagore and forever associated with Tagore's Adi Brahmo Samaj. A powerful section of "the Brahmo Samaj within the Brahmo Samaj of India" and with reformist views more advanced than Keshub's, especially on women's education and upliftment, now openly complained that they were left with no religious status whatsoever other than to turn to Christ like their leader, which was distasteful to them or return to Brahmo Dharma's fold in disgrace. In 1873 Sen was caused to trenchantly counter this faction by the following speech:

Whither is the spirit of God leading India? Towards the Brahmo Samaj? I say, No. To deny Heaven that is leading us onwards to his Holy Church would argue blind infidelity. You dare not deny that India is marching towards the Kingdom of Heaven. But the Brahmo Samaj, as it is, is not God's Holy Church; as it has no semblance whatever of the Kingdom of Heaven. Verily, verily, this Brahmo Samaj is a ridiculous caricature of the Church of God.

== Annette Akroyd and the female emancipation controversy ==
Around 1875 Sen was involved in a public controversy with Annette Akroyd a prominent feminist and social reformer who had sailed to India in October 1872. Akroyd was shocked by her discussions with Sen and felt that Sen, the rhetorician of women's education in England was a typical Hindu obscurantist back home in India, trying to keep knowledge from the minds of women. This dispute spilled into the native press and had its impact on the Bethune School. Akroyd was also dismayed with Sen's associates such as Bijoy Krishna Goswami, Aghore Nath Gupta and Gour Govinda Ray who were traditionally Hindu in educational background and resisting the education of women in British India.

Mr. Sen had a strong prejudice against university education, in fact, against what is generally regarded as high education, of women. He objected to teaching them, for instance, such subjects as Mathematics, Philosophy and Science, whereas the advanced party positively wanted to give their daughters and sisters what is generally regarded as high education. They did not object to their university education and were not disposed to make much difference in point of education between men and women. There was no hope of compromise between two such extreme schools of thought, Accordingly, the radical party proceeded to start a separate female school of their own, called the Hindu Mahila Vidyalaya for the education of the adult young ladies belonging to their party. The successful manner in which they carried on the work of this school under Miss Akroyd, subsequently Mrs. Beveridge, attracted much public notice and was highly praised by the officers of Government. This school did excellent work for many years and was subsequently conducted under the name of the Banga Mahila Vidyalaya and was at last amalgamated with the Bethune College for ladies, to which it furnished some of its most distinguished students.

== Mysticism controversies ==
He developed a tendency towards mysticism and a greater leaning to the spiritual teaching of the Indian philosophies. He gave his daughter, Suniti Devi in marriage to Maharaja Nripendra Narayan of Cooch Behar; he revived the performance of mystical plays, and himself took part in one. These changes alienated many of his followers, who deserted his standard and founded the Sadharan Brahmo Samaj in 1878.

Sen did what he could to reinvigorate his followers with new ideas and phrases, such as the "New Dispensation", the "Holy Spirit". He also instituted a sacramental meal of rice and water similar to the Sikh system of Amrit (nectar) initiation for new converts. He also attempted a wider appeal to Indians with a more mystical approach. The Ethnographer General writes:-

From about this period, or a little before, Keshub Chandar Sen appears to have attempted to make a wider appeal to Indians by developing the emotional side of his religion. And he gradually relapsed from a pure unitarian theism into what was practically Hindu pantheism and the mysticism of the Yogis. At the same time he came to consider himself an inspired prophet, and proclaimed himself as such.

One example of his new doctrines were described by Professor Oman:

In 1873 he brought forward the doctrine of Adesh or special inspiration, declaring emphatically that inspiration is not only possible, but a veritable fact in the lives of many devout souls in this age. The following years witnessed a marked development of that essentially Asiatic and perhaps more especially Indian form of religious feeling, which finds its natural satisfaction in solitary ecstatic contemplation. As a necessary consequence an order of devotees was established in 1876, divided into three main classes, which in ascending gradation were designated Shabaks, Bhaktas and Yogis. The lowest class, divided into two sections, is devoted to religious study and the practical performance of religious duties, including doing good to others.

On his return to India he established the Indian Reform Association, which had five areas of activity: inexpensive literature, female improvement, education, temperance, and charity. In two lectures delivered between 1881 and 1883 he shared his latest doctrines. They were "That Marvelous Mystery – the Trinity" and "Asia's Message to Europe". The latter is an eloquent plea against the Europeanising of Asia, as well as a protest against Western sectarianism. During the intervals of his last illness he wrote The New Samhita, or the Sacred Laws of the Aryans of the New Dispensation. He died on 8 January 1884. His Hindu funeral was attended by over 2000 people.

== Ramakrishna's influence ==
In 1876 the then unknown Ramakrishna Paramhansa came looking for Sen and first met him at Sadhan Kanan. Ramakrishna's poor, rough, unconventional exterior had earlier repelled other Brahmo celebrities like Debendranath Tagore whom Ramakrishna had approached; and even Sen initially showed no affinity towards Ramakrishna's mysticism, and was hostile. He was won over to Ramakrishna less by his teachings than by his manner, which Keshub Sen identified with the behaviour of an authentic saint. When Ramakrishna met him, Keshub had accepted Christianity, and had separated from the Brahmo Samaj. Formerly, Keshub had rejected idolatry practised by his family, but after coming under Ramakrishna's influence he again accepted Hindu polytheism and established the "New Dispensation" (Nava Vidhan) religious movement, which was based on Ramakrishna's principles—"Worship of God as Mother", "All religions are true." His acceptance of idolatry created factions within his organisation. He also publicised Ramakrishna's teachings in the New Dispensation journal over a period of several years, which was instrumental in bringing Ramakrishna to the attention of a wider audience, especially the Bhadralok and the Europeans residing in India. Ramakrishna too had deep respect for Keshub. Ramakrishna said of him shortly before his death that "the rose tree is to be transplanted because the gardener wants beautiful roses of him."

== Universal religion ==
His opponents felt that he had rejected completely the tenets of Brahmoism settled by Rammohun Roy (as cited by J. N. Farquahar and other scholars), and in January 1881, the New Dispensation was formally announced in the Sunday Mirror of 23 October:

Our position is not that truths are to be found in all religions; but that all the established religions of the world are true. There is a great deal of difference between the two assertions. The glorious mission of the New Dispensation is to harmonise religions and revelations, to establish the truth of every particular dispensation, and upon the basis of these particulars to establish the largest and broadest induction of a general and glorious proposition.

Sen adopted a number of ceremonies from both Hinduism and Christianity, calling God "Mother", and adopting the homa sacrifice and the arati ceremony (the waving of lights) into Brahma ritual. He found spiritual nourishment in Durga Puja, and composed a hymn of praise containing 108 names of God, along with other forms of worship that echoed traditional Hindu prayers.

The Nabo Bidhan school generated considerable antagonism among Brahmo Samajists, since Sen's followers represented that they were also Brahmos. Eight Brahmos of Sylhet (now in Bangladesh) including Raj Chandra Chaudhuri and Pandit Sitanath Tattvabhushan issued the following proclamation in 1880:

Let us all, every Brahmo and Brahmo Samaj, combine to let the world know that the New Dispensation is not the Brahmo religion: That we have not the least sympathy for the creed: That the New Dispensation is totally opposed to Brahmoism.

This proclamation of the Sadharan Brahmo Samaj resulted in 1881 of the formation of the Brahmo Conference Organisation to publicly denounce and expose Keshub Sen and his Nabo Bidhan movement from every platform as being "anti-Brahmo" in terms of the aforesaid proclamation.

Bipin Chandra Pal has succinctly summarised the evolution:

To Keshub, however, was left the work of organising Rammohun Roy's philosophy into a real universal religion through new rituals, liturgies, sacraments and disciplines, wherein were sought to be brought together not only the theories and doctrines of the different world religions but also their outer vehicles and formularies to the extent that these were real vehicles of their religious or spiritual life, divested, however, through a process of spiritual sifting, of their imperfections and errors and superstitions.

Chittaranjan Das explained Sen's attempt to create a universal religion. Speaking in 1917 he said:

The earlier religion of his (Keshub Chunder Sen's) life was perhaps somewhat abstract. But his religion in developed form, as we find it, in his Navavidhan, is full of concrete symbols of all religions... Every Hindu is conscious of the underlying unity of this universalism. Read the devotional poems of the Vaishnavas, read the devotional poems of the Shaktas and the other sects, you will find they were identical in this character. The life and work of Keshub Chunder Sen also point to attempt after attempt at this very universalism... The result may or may not be considered satisfactory. But I refuse to judge it by the results. I rejoice in the glory of the attempt.

== Personal life ==
Keshub Chandra Sen was married to Jagonmohini Sen. The couple had ten children: five sons – Karuna Chandra Sen, Nirmal Chandra Sen, Prafulla Chandra Sen, Saral Chandra Sen, and Dr. Subroto Sen; and five daughters – Suniti Devi (Maharani of Cooch Behar), Sabitri Devi, Sucharu Devi (Maharani of Mayurbhanj), Monica Devi and Sujata Devi. Classical singer Naina Devi (1917–1993) and actress and dancer Sadhana Bose (1914–1973), daughters of Saral Sen, were his granddaughters.
