= Husne Ara Kamal =

Bangladeshi academic and social worker

- হোসনে আরা কামাল
- Born: 20 December 1934; Rajshahi District, Bengal Presidency, British India
- Died: 16 April 2009 (aged 74); Dhaka, Bangladesh
- Education: University of Dhaka; Bedford College; Columbia University
- Occupations: Professor; Author; Social worker
- Spouse: Mustafa Kamal (m. 1956)
- Children: 3, including Nashid Kamal
- Father: Md. Hafizur Rahman
- Relatives: Abbasuddin Ahmed (father-in-law); Anisur Rahman (brother); Mustafa Zaman Abbasi (brother-in-law); Ferdausi Rahman (sister-in-law); Armeen Musa (granddaughter); Maziruddin Ahmed (granduncle-in-law)
- Awards: Ratnagarva Ma

Husne Ara Kamal (Note: Alternatively spelled as Hosne Ara Kamal, Husneara Kamal, Hosneara Kamal in various publications in English.) (Bengali: হোসনে আরা কামাল; 20 December 1934 – 16 April 2009) was a Bangladeshi academic, philanthropist, and social worker who made significant contributions to social welfare and women's empowerment in Bangladesh throughout her career. She worked as a lecturer and later became the director and a professor at the Institute of Social Welfare and Research in Dhaka, Bangladesh. Kamal was also an accomplished author and published several books on women and gender issues, as well as books for children.

== Early life and education ==
Husne Ara was born on 20 December 1934, in Rajshahi district, to Md. Hafizur Rahman and Anwara Begum. She was an accomplished academic, earning post-graduate degrees from Dhaka University, Bedford College, and a master's degree in social science from Columbia University in the US in 1979.

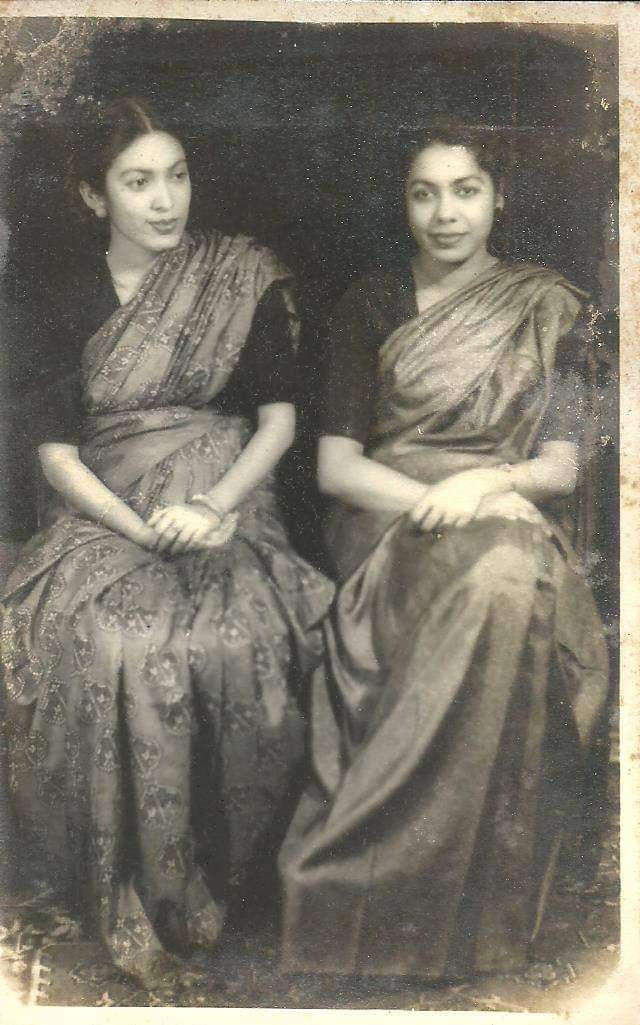
Husne Ara Kamal with Sufia Ahmed (later National Professor of Bangladesh) in 1956

== Career ==
Kamal started her career as a lecturer at the Institute of Social Welfare and Research, formerly known as Social Welfare College, of Dhaka University in 1960. During this time, she was also the principal of Purana Paltan Girls' College in Dhaka. By 1966, Kamal had earned a reputation for her writings on children's literature.

After the independence of Bangladesh, she focused on women's empowerment, publishing several books on the topic, including Women in Distress and Women in Charge of Household. Kamal became increasingly concerned about the impact of overpopulation on the country. She wrote Family Life Education as a Factor in Promoting Family including Family Planning in which she detailed steps in educating women and dealing with the sociological aspects of this subject.

In 1991, she was appointed as the director of the institute and was promoted to the rank of professor in 1994. She retired from her position in 2001.

== Philanthropy ==
Kamal was involved in philanthropy, often donating anonymously. She was an advocate for women's rights and dedicated much of her life to improving the status of women and children in Bangladesh. She worked to establish programs that provided education and job training for women, advocated for laws that protected women from violence and discrimination, and supported organizations that provided social services to women and children in need. She supported various social service organizations and NGOs such as Palli Shishu Foundation of Bangladesh (PSF), B.M.N., Centre for the Rehabilitation of the Paralysed (CRP), Women for Women, Women's Voluntary Association (WVA), Mental Health Association, and The Hunger Project. In 2006, she publicly donated Tk 15 lakh (Note: As of 2006, 1 Bangladeshi Taka (BDT) was equivalent to approximately 0.015 USD. Therefore, Tk 15 lakh would be equivalent to approximately 22,500 USD.) to Dhaka Ahsania Mission.

== Awards ==
In recognition of her services, she was awarded the 'Ratnagarva Ma' award (Note: Ratnagarva Ma is an award (Bengali: রত্নগর্ভা মা পুরস্কার) which aims to recognize mothers and the important role that they play in society of Bangladesh.) in September 2004.

== Personal life ==
Kamal married Chief Justice Mustafa Kamal, son of Abbasuddin Ahmed, on 14 December 1956. They had three daughters, Nashid Kamal, Naeela K Sattar, and Nazeefa Monem. Ismail Sattar, son of M. A. Sattar and ASM Mainuddin Monem, son of Abdul Monem are her son-in-laws. Her granddaughter, Armeen Musa is a Grammy nominated singer-songwriter and composer.

== Death ==
Kamal died on 16 April 2009, as a result of a heart attack. She had been battling the heart disease for some time prior to her death. She is survived by her husband, three daughters, and seven grandchildren. Throughout her life, Kamal dedicated herself to serving society, leaving behind a legacy that inspires many.

== Bibliography ==
Kamal was an accomplished author and published several books on women and gender issues. She has also written many books for children.

- পাখীরা ঘরে ফিরবেই (The birds will return home)
- দায়িত্ব দুঃস্থ নারী (Women in distress)
- বৃক্ষ তোমাকে ভালোবাসি
- পরিবারের একক দায়িত্ব দুঃস্থ নারী জীবন ও সংগ্রাম / Paribarer Akok Daittee Nari " (1989) (Women in Charge of Household)
- দুত্তোর রাজা মশাই
- ছড়ায় পড়া
- Ivur jonne Chhora
- Fuljhuri
- Women Separated, Divorced and Windowed

=== Papers ===
- Ara, Hosne, Family Life Education as a Factor in Promoting Family including Family Planning
