= Armeen Musa =

Bangladeshi singer-songwriter

Armeen Musa আরমীন মূসা
- Born: 24 July 1986 (age 39); Dhaka, Bangladesh
- Occupations: Singer; songwriter; musician
- Years active: 2008–present
- Website: armeenmusa.com

Armeen Musa (born 24 July 1986) is a Bangladeshi music director, composer, singer-songwriter, and actor. She is the first Bangladeshi composer to be part of a Grammy Nominated album, Shuruat by Berklee Indian Ensemble.

== Career ==
During her teenage years, Armeen was deeply inspired by musicians like Shayan Chowdhury Arnob, Sahana Bajpaie, and Anusheh Anadil.

Armeen started her first band at the age of 14 and released her debut album Aye Ghum Bhangai in 2008. She gained wider recognition with her hit single Bhromor Koiyo Giya, a modern rendition of Radharaman Dutta's classic song.

Armeen received training from her Guru Sujit Mustafa and graduated from the Berklee College of Music in 2014. Her passion for world music and western fusion led her to create her own choir band, the Ghaashphoring Choir, which performed in the second season of Coke Studio Bangla under her direction for Pritom Hasan’s Deora

Armeen has had many notable achievements during her stay at Berklee College of Music, including the opportunity to perform in front of A. R. Rahman. She was part of the Berklee Indian Ensemble that performed remakes of Rahman's songs during the occasion of his receiving a doctorate degree from the college. She also performed as part of the choir with Bobby McFerrin, and Indian composer Clinton Cerejo; both as part of Berklee’s student-artist exchange programs.

Her album Live from Space was released in 2019. The album was composed of Armeen's own tracks and renditions of popular songs. It was recorded and completed with both audio and video done by Dewan Anamul Islam Raju and Tanzim Ahmed Bijoy respectively, in just two days.

In 2022, Armeen made history by becoming the first Bangladeshi composer to be part of a Grammy-nominated album, Shuruat by Berklee Indian Ensemble for the 65th Annual Grammy Awards in the category of Best Global Music Album. The album featured a song composed by Armeen and written by her mother, Nashid Kamal, titled Jaago Piya. The song was performed alongside famous musicians such as Ustad Zakir Hossain, Shankar Mahadevan, and Shreya Ghoshal.

In 2023, Armeen made her debut in acting. Under the direction of Syed Jamil Ahmed, she performed as an actor in his theatre production of Nilima Ibrahim’s Ami Birangona Bolchi and as composer to the soundtrack, that was performed live by Ghaashphoring Choir in the Studio Theatre Hall at Bangladesh Shilpakala Academy, June 2023.

Apart from music, Armeen enjoys blogging about food, sharing her love for recipes and restaurant reviews on her IG account, 'dhakadelicacy'.

== Personal life ==
Armeen is the elder daughter of Professor Nashid Kamal, a professor, singer, writer and Nazrul Scholar. Her Grandfather was the former Chief Justice of Bangladesh Mustafa Kamal, and her Grandmother was Professor Husne Ara Kamal. Armeen's family has a rich musical heritage. Her Great-Grandfather was the legendary Bengali folk singer Abbasuddin Ahmed, while her Great Uncle Mustafa Zaman Abbasi and Great Aunt Ferdausi Rahman are renowned musicians. Her great great granduncle was politician Maziruddin Ahmed.

Her other Great Grandfather was Md. Hafizur Rahman, Minister and civil servant, and her Great Uncle Professor Anisur Rahman, prominent economist and Rabindrasangeet exponent of Bangladesh.

== Discography ==
=== Studio albums ===
- Aye Ghum Bhangai (2008)
- Finding Fall (2013)
- Simultaneously (2015)

=== Live albums ===
- Live from Space (2019)
- Being in love with the King of the World - Live in Sydney (2022)

=== Soundtracks ===
- Shongram (full soundtrack) (2014) as composer, producer, playback singer in Shongram
- Golpo Tomar Amar (2016) as composer and singer featured in the documentary The Saints of Sin
- Nidraheen (2016) as composer and singer featured in the documentary The Saints of Sin
- Nidraheen (2025) as composer and singer featured in the film Widow’s Shadow

=== Singles ===
- Duur Theke (2007) featured in Jhalmurri 1, featuring Nabila and produced by Shayan Chowdhury Arnob
- Onek Din Por (2018)
- Back for me (2023)

=== As director of Ghaashphoring Choir ===
- Mayabono Biharini (2016) as featured in the film The Saints of Sin
- Kichu Kotha Kichu Gaan (2019) Studio album
- Fagun Hawai Hawai (2020)
- Poush Toder (2023)
- Deora (2023) Coke Studio Bangla produced by Pritom Hasan and Fazlu Majhi featuring Armeen Musa, Ghaasphoring Choir and Islam Uddin Palakar
- Collaboration with Anusheh Anadil's album KALO

=== Collaborations ===
- Nishpaap Oporadh (2004) Icons featuring Armeen Musa
- Bhromor Koio Giya (2005) Fuad Al-Muqtadir featuring Armeen Musa
- Asha (2005) Fuad Al-Muqtadir featuring Armeen Musa
- Ei Ki Beshi Na (2006) Yaatri featuring Armeen Musa
- Duur Theke (2007) Armeen Musa and Nabila, Produced by Shayan Chowdhury Arnob
- Ahobane (2009) Rajib Rahman featuring Armeen Musa and Bawla
- Jaago Piya (2017) Berklee Indian Ensemble featuring Armeen Musa
- Lilabali (2022) Coke Studio Bangla featuring Armeen Musa, Warda Ashraf, Sanzida Mahmood Nandita, Masha Islam, Rubayat Rehman, Jannatul Firdous Akbar, Karishma Shanu Sovvota, Tasfia Fatima (Tashfee) & Md. Makhon Mia

=== Film playbacks ===
- Nodi Bhora Dheu- Jiyo Kaka OST (2011)
- Brishty- Ice Cream (2016 film)
- Raater Mazhar- Eagoler Chokh (2016)
- Emon Kore Bolchi- Swapnajaal OST (2018)
- Bhoi Korche- Bhoot Chaturdashi (film) (2019)
- Urey Urey Jaay- Sharey Showlo (Hoichoi webseries produced by Tinu Rashid of Karnival) (2023)
