= Balarampur, Koch Bihar =

Village in West Bengal, India

Balarampur
- Village
- Location within West Bengal Location within India
- Coordinates: 26°14′28″N 89°34′41″E
- Country: India
- State: West Bengal
- District: Koch Bihar
- Block: Tufanganj - I

Government
  - Type: Sarpanch

Area
  - Total: 50.52 km^{2} (19.51 sq mi)
- Elevation: 38 m (125 ft)

Population (2011)
  - Total: 34,113
  - Density: 675.2/km^{2} (1,749/sq mi)

Languages
  - Official: Bengali
- Time zone: UTC+5:30 (IST)
- PIN: 736132
- STD code: 03582
- Vehicle registration: WB-64

Balarampur is a village in the northeastern part of West Bengal, India. It is located within Koch Bihar District, and is close to India's border with Bangladesh. The village had 34,113 residents as of the 2011 census.

== Geography ==
Balarampur is in the western shore of Kaljani River, about 17 kilometres southwest of the district seat Koch Bihar. The village covers an overall area of 5052.29 hectares.

== Demographics ==
In 2011, there were 34,113 residents within 8,262 households of Balarampur. The number of male residents was 17,595, while the number of female residents was 16,518. The working population comprised 36.82% of the total population. The village had a total literacy rate of 65.52%, with 12,456 literate males and 9,895 literate females.

== Notable people ==
- Ahmed family of Balarampur
  - Maziruddin Ahmed (born 1898), politician
  - Abbasuddin Ahmed (1901–1959), musician
  - Mustafa Kamal Abbasi (1933–2015), 9th Chief Justice of Bangladesh
  - Ferdausi Rahman (born 1941), singer
  - Mustafa Zaman Abbasi (1936–2025), musicologist
  - Nashid Kamal (born 1958), singer
