= Md. Hafizur Rahman =

Bengali politician and civil servant (1900–1984)

The Honourable Md. Hafizur Rahman SQA
- মোঃ হাফিজুর রহমান
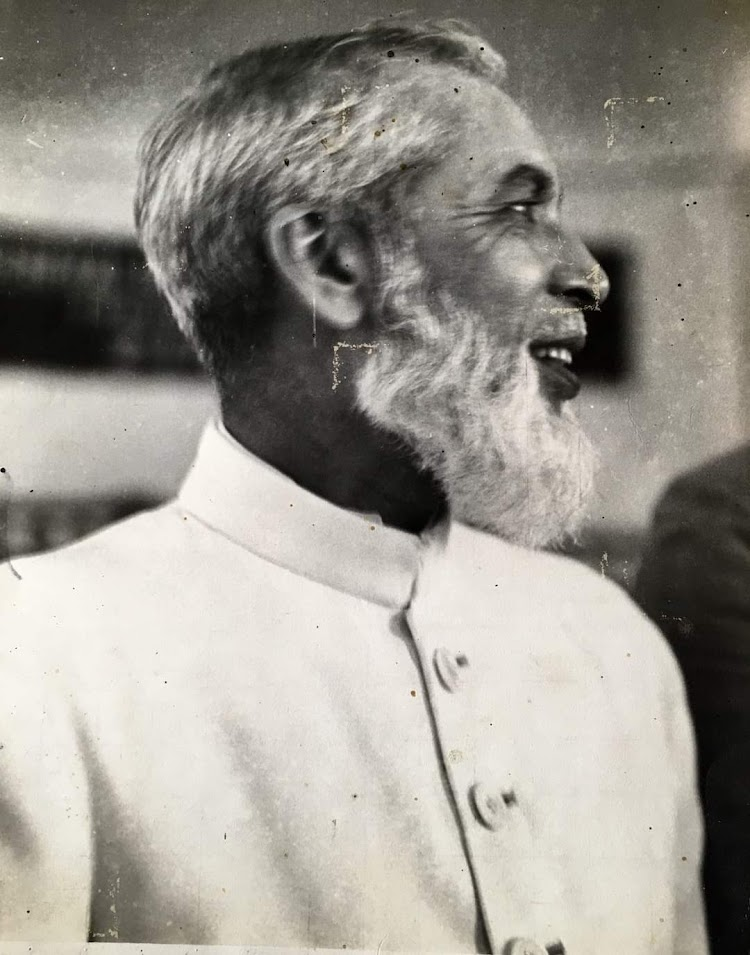
- Md. Hafizur Rahman, c. 1960

Leader of the House of East Pakistan
- In office 26 December 1963 – 1965
- Governor: Abdul Monem Khan
- Preceded by: A. T. M. Mustafa
- Succeeded by: Dewan Abdul Basith

Minister of Finance and Planning of East Pakistan
- In office 29 May 1962 – 1965
- Governor: List: Abdul Monem Khan (Oct 1962) Ghulam Faruque Khan (May 1962 – Oct 1962)
- Preceded by: Manoranjan Dhar
- Succeeded by: Mirza Nurul Huda

Minister of Commerce of Pakistan
- In office 16 January 1960 – 28 May 1962
- President: Ayub Khan
- Preceded by: Zulfikar Ali Bhutto
- Succeeded by: Abdul Qadir Sanjrani

Minister of Food and Agriculture of Pakistan
- In office 28 October 1958 – 16 January 1960
- President: Ayub Khan
- Preceded by: Mian Jaffer Shah
- Succeeded by: Muhammad Azam Khan

Personal details
- Born: 26 January 1900 Kendua, Bengal Presidency, British India
- Died: 15 May 1984 (aged 84) Dhaka, Bangladesh
- Children: 6, including Anisur and Husne Ara
- Relatives: Mustafa Kamal (son-in-Law); Nashid Kamal (granddaughter); Armeen Musa (great granddaughter)
- Education: University of Dhaka (MA)
- Occupation: University lecturer
- Awards: Sitara-e-Quaid-e-Azam; Order of Merit for Agriculture

Mohammad Hafizur Rahman (Note: Alternatively spelled as Muhammad Hafizur Rehman in various publications in English.) SQA (Bengali: মোহাম্মদ হাফিজুর রহমান, Urdu: محمد حفیظ الرحمن; 2 June 1902 (Note: Some sources list his date of birth as 1900, including his autobiography.)– 15 May 1984), known as Md. Hafizur Rahman (Bengali: মোঃ হাফিজুর রহমান), was a senior civil servant and minister, whose career spanned British colonial India, Pakistan, and Bangladesh. Born into a Bengali Muslim family in British India, Hafizur Rahman rose from a village boy in Mymensingh to prominent positions of authority. He excelled academically, securing scholarships and graduating with honors in Economics from the University of Dhaka.

Starting as an assistant lecturer at Dhaka University, Hafizur Rahman later joined the Bengal Civil Service, holding various administrative positions and progressing to roles such as assistant secretary, joint secretary, and director in multiple government departments.

With the establishment of Pakistan in 1947, Hafizur Rahman rose in rank and became part of the Civil Service of Pakistan. He served in crucial positions, such as Chief Controller of Jute Regulations and District Magistrate, actively representing Pakistan's interests on the global stage in various roles like the Joint Secretary in the departments of food and agriculture.

In the wake of Ayub Khan's rise to power, Hafizur Rahman was appointed as the Minister of Food and Agriculture in 1958 in the central cabinet and later as the Minister of Commerce in 1960. He led Pakistan's delegation to international conferences, seeking global cooperation, and emphasized the urgent need for economic parity between East Pakistan and West Pakistan. After long-standing disagreements with Ayub Khan and the introduction of the new Constitution of Pakistan allowing for provincial governments in 1962, he resigned from his federal posts and moved to East Pakistan, becoming the Provincial Minister of Finance and Planning until his retirement in 1965. He was elected as the leader of the House of the Provincial Assembly of East Pakistan in 1963.

After retiring from politics, Hafizur Rahman remained involved in economic development initiatives in underprivileged areas of East Pakistan. After Bangladesh emerged as a new state, Hafizur Rahman continued to contribute to the development of the country's post-war broken economy by taking senior roles asn chairman. advisers and directors of different government and commercial organisations,

His legacy was defined by his pursuit of development and progress for East Pakistan and later Bangladesh. Advocating for provincial autonomy and separate industrial units in the region, Hafizur Rahman's efforts laid the groundwork for the formulation of the six-point demands, which carried significant implications for Pakistan's future.

== Early life and education ==
Hafizur Rahman was born on 26 January 1900 into a Bengali Muslim family of the village of Kawrat, Noapara, Kendua, Mymensingh district in the province of Bengal in British India (now Netrokona District, Mymensingh Division, Bangladesh). His father Munshi Zainul Abedin was an Imam of a mosque. He was the second among six brothers and four sisters. Hammad, Hafizullah, Dr. Hamidur Rahman, Dr. Lutfur Rahman, and Habibur Rahman were his brothers. He achieved remarkable academic success, securing scholarships throughout his education from lower primary to postgraduate levels. He studied at Mymensingh Zilla School, He passed the Matriculation examination in 1919 and graduated from Presidency College Calcutta in 1921. He graduated with honors in economics from University of Dhaka, obtaining a first-class degree in both his Bachelor of Arts in 1924 and Master of Arts in 1925.

== Career ==
=== Early career (1925-1951) ===
After graduating in 1925, Hafizur Rahman worked as an assistant lecturer at Dhaka University until he joined the Bengal Civil Service on 8 July 1926. From August 1928 to July 1938, he served in various districts of Bengal, fulfilling the duties of a Magistrate Revenue Officer. He also worked in the Co-operative Department as an Assistant Registrar of Cooperative Societies. In 1942, he became an assistant secretary in the Home (Defense) Department and also was the deputy secretary, public health and local self-government department until the establishment of Pakistan in 1947.

After the establishment of Pakistan, Hafizur Rahman held several administrative posts until 1951. He served as Additional District Magistrate in Dhaka and held positions of Director of Textiles in the Government of East Pakistan, Director of Procurement and Distribution in the Civil Supplies Department. and District Magistrate of Barisal.

=== Civil Service of Pakistan (1951-1957) ===
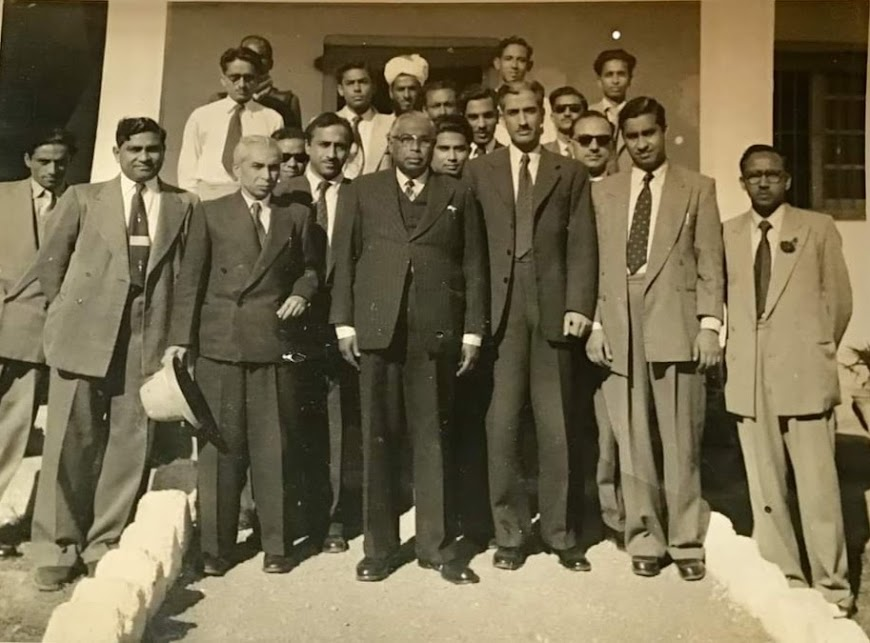
Joint Secretary Hafizur Rahman (front row, third from left) with a delegation, 1956

In 1951, Hafizur Rahman was promoted to the Civil Service of Pakistan. In 1953, he became the Chief Controller of Jute Regulations and District Magistrate of Backergunge District. He actively participated in international conferences as member of Pakistan's delegation, including the ECOSOC Conference in Geneva in 1954.

After returning from Geneva, he served as Joint Secretary in the Planning Board of the Government of East Pakistan and later as Joint Secretary in the Ministry of Food and Agriculture of the Government of Pakistan until his retirement from the CSP in 1957.

Later that same year, Hafizur Rahman was reappointed Officer on Special Duty, with the status of Divisional Food Commissioner, in the Department of Food, Government of East Pakistan until he was withdrawn from his posts by General Iskandar Ali Mirza when he became Governor.

=== Minister of Food and Agriculture (1958-1960) ===
After Muhammad Ayub Khan came to power in October 1958, Hafizur Rahman was appointed as Minister of Food and Agriculture in the central government of Pakistan. In 1959, he led the Pakistan delegation to the 10th Session of the F.A.O. conference in Rome. In order to study the developments that the European countries had attained in the various sectors of agriculture, he also visited Spain, U.K., Holland, Turkey and Syria. He led a short-term plan to establish 500 tube wells and 3,000 open wells to enhance agricultural productivity within Pakistan, and saw through a controlled irrigation project spanning vast acres of land in East Pakistan.

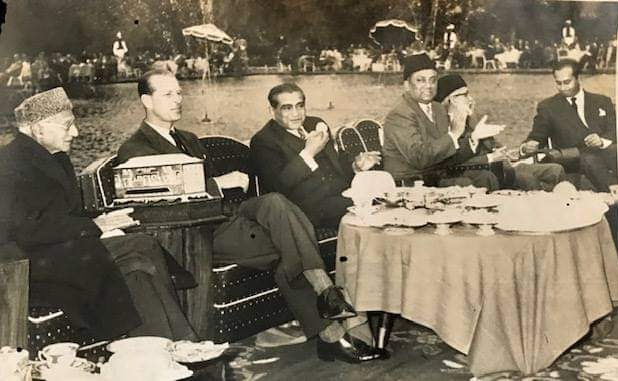
Hafizur Rahman (second from right) with Prince Philip, Akhter Husain, Habibur Rahman, and Zulfikar Ali Bhutto in the Shalimar Gardens, Lahore, February 1959

=== Minister of Commerce (1960-1962) ===
In 1960, after a reshuffling of portfolios between the Ministers of the Presidential Cabinet Minister, Hafizur Rahman was made Minister of Commerce. At times, he also held the portfolio of Tourism.

As East Pakistani federal ministers of the central government, Hafizur Rahman, A. K. Khan, Muhammad Ibrahim, Habibur Rahman served a crucial role in upholding the interests of East Pakistan for its development.

Hafizur Rahman emphasized that the economic disparity between East and West Pakistan was mainly due to the failure of former politicians from East Pakistan to safeguard their province's interests. He highlighted that the current government had invested significantly in East Pakistan, with average annual development expenditure rising from 170.2 million rupees (1955–58) to 310.9 million rupees (1958–60). However, he asserted that despite these efforts, more substantial measures would be required to effectively end the economic disparity between the two wings after decades of exploitation.

The Bengali ministers focus on economic disparity between East and West Pakistan laid the groundwork for the later formulation of the six-point demands. However, to curtail their influence, ministerial portfolios were subject to constant divisions and changes, resulting in significant reductions in the portfolios of the four Bengali ministers without prior input or consensus.

As these conflicts were evolving within Pakistan, Hafizur Rahman engaged in several key trade agreements and diplomatic missions with various countries, aiming to enhance economic cooperation and foster international relations.

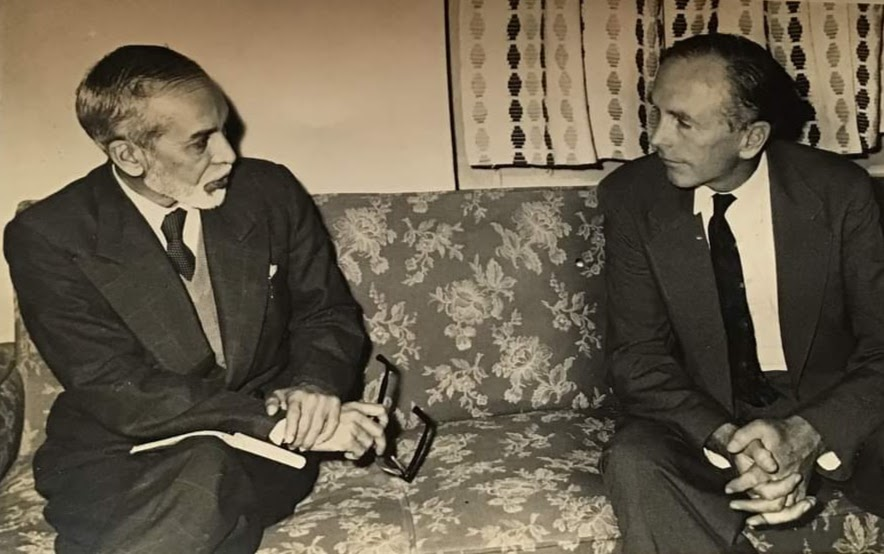
Hafizur Rahman with Alec Douglas-Home British Foreign Secretary, 1960

In June 1960, Hafizur Rahman received the Prime Minister of Northern Nigeria Ahmadu Bello in Karachi to discuss bilateral ties between Northern Nigeria and Pakistan.

On 12 January 1960, Hafizur Rahman and William M. Rountree, United States Ambassador to Pakistan signed protocols relating to the Treaty of Friendship between Pakistan and the United States which provided favored nation status between the two countries and reduced trade barriers.

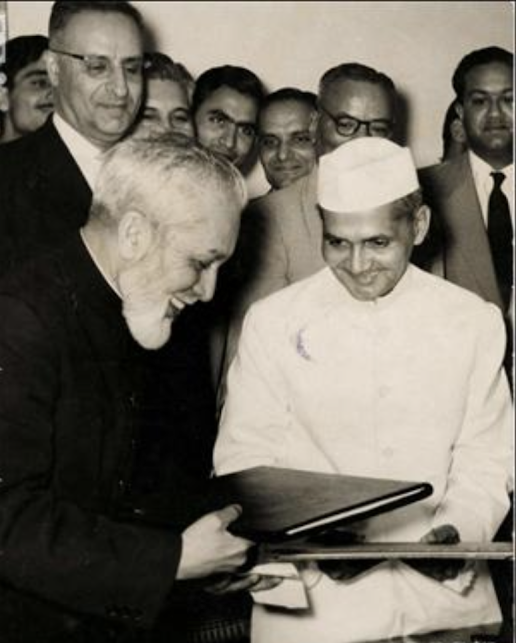
Hafizur Rahman exchanging the signed Trade Agreement with Lal Bahadur Shastri, March 1960

In March 1960, a trade delegation led by Hafizur Rahman visited New Delhi to negotiate with his counterpart Lal Bahadur Shastri and sign the Indo-Pakistan Trade Agreement which created special arrangements for trade between the countries.

On 29 June 1960, Hafizur Rahman held discussions with the Law Minister Justice Muhammad Ibrahim regarding the appropriate course of action in response to Ayub Khan's speeches, inclinations, and actions concerning the Constitution that he was making changes to. Privately, the ministers concurred on demanding provincial autonomy for East Pakistan in all matters except defense, foreign policy, and currency, which they considered as the minimum requirement to fulfill East Pakistan's needs and safeguard it from exploitation.

In May 1961, he led a ministerial level delegation to Burma to discuss rice imports from Burma to meet Pakistan's rice needs and food security.

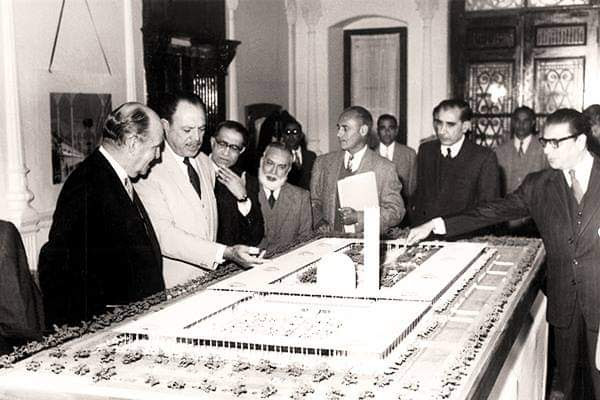
Hafizur Rahman (forth from left) with Ayub Khan, I H Usmani, M H Zuberi, Ghulam Ishaq Khan viewing the PINSTECH model presented by Edward Durell Stone, November 1961

On 6 November 1961, Hafizur Rahman welcomed the U.S. Investment Development Mission led by David E. Westly from the U.S. Department of Commerce to discuss the prospects of developing trade in manufacturing goods for the United States Markets.

In December 1961, he met the Burmese trade delegation again in Pakistan to finalize imports to meet the major portion of East Pakistan's rice demands.

On 16 January 1962, Hafizur Rahman began trade talks with Ceylon (now Sri Lanka) with T. B. Ilangaratne to enhance and expand Pakistan-Ceylon trade relations.

In March 1962, the new constitution unveiled by Ayub Khan vested all executive authority of the republic in the president. Throughout the Ayub years, East Pakistan and West Pakistan grew farther apart. The new constitution contributed further to the resentment as it did not provide the concessions that the East Pakistanis have been asking for. One change from prior was that the provinces would run their separate provincial governments. To that effect, Hafizur Rahman had internally decided to join the provincial government in East Pakistan.

That same month, Hafizur Rahman addressed the international jute conference and stressed the importance of price stabilization for the mutual benefit of sellers and buyers, underscoring the need for implementing measures like the creation of a buffer stock based on the Jute Inquiry Commissioner's recommendation.

In May 1962, Hafizur Rahman headed a trade promotion mission to a number of Middle-East countries. Between 9 and 12 May 1962, he led an official trade delegation to Baghdad, Iraq, resulting in a formal trade agreement between the two countries. The agreement facilitated the exchange of rice, jute, electrical materials, and other industrial products from Pakistan for Iraqi cement, petroleum products, and dates. In Beirut, Lebanon, he held discussions with Lebanese of Food and Agriculture; and Economic Minister, Rafie Naja and business representatives to explore the prospects of promoting trade between Pakistan and Lebanon. He led a similar trip to Cairo, United Arab Republic. On 20 May 1962, Hafizur Rahman signed a new Trade and Payments Agreement with Iran in Tehran. The agreement aimed to restart trade between Pakistan and Iran.

Upon his return from the trip to the Middle East, on 28 May 1962, Hafizur Rahman resigned as the Commerce Minister in the central government and moved back to East Pakistan. On the same day, he was appointed as the provincial Minister of Finance and Planning of East Pakistan under the new constitution enacted a few months earlier.

=== Minister of Finance and Planning (1962-1965) ===
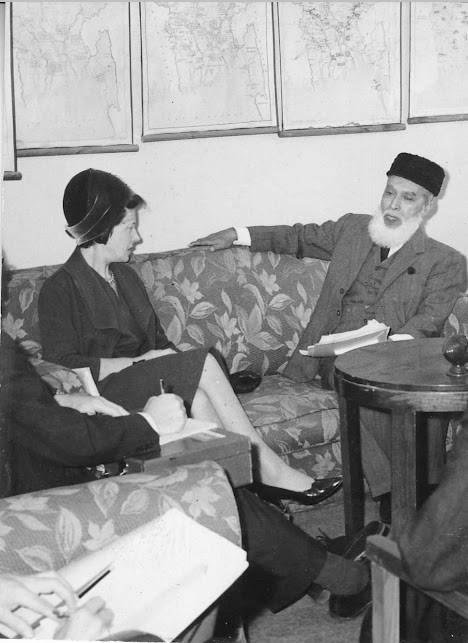
Hafizur Rahman meeting Barbara Castle, January 1965

Hafizur Rahman was sworn in as Finance Minister of East Pakistan on 29 May 1962. His first task was to tackle the tea shortage in Pakistan by assuring the public that there was sufficient tea in stock for domestic use, while attributing the cause of the shortage to large tea exports, necessary for driving East Pakistan's economic growth.

Hafizur Rahman represented Pakistan as the leader of the delegation during a successful mission to Tokyo, Japan, in March 1964, focusing on obtaining aid for the country's development and the establishment of a proposed steel mill, which was seen as a crucial step in the country's fight against poverty and efforts to boost the local economy.

In January 1965, Hafizur Rahman met with Barbara Castle, the British Minister for Overseas Development, in Dacca to discuss possible assistance that the U.K. Government could provide for the Province's development projects, with focus on addressing economic disparities in East Pakistan.

Throughout his tenure, he also held the portfolios of Commerce and Industry at various times. Rahman aggressively pursued policies aimed at bridging the economic disparity between East and West Pakistan. He emphasized the need to examine demands for separate industrial units based on economic and physical advantages and stressed the importance of industrializing East Pakistan to address the economic imbalance and bridge the gap of disparity between the two wings of the country. He urged industrialists and bankers to create more capital in East Pakistan. He was party to massive developmental projects including development of the Chalna Anchorage, a milk plant in Dacca, construction of bridges and introduction of mechanized farming in East Pakistan. He retired from his post in 1965.

=== Post-retirement ===
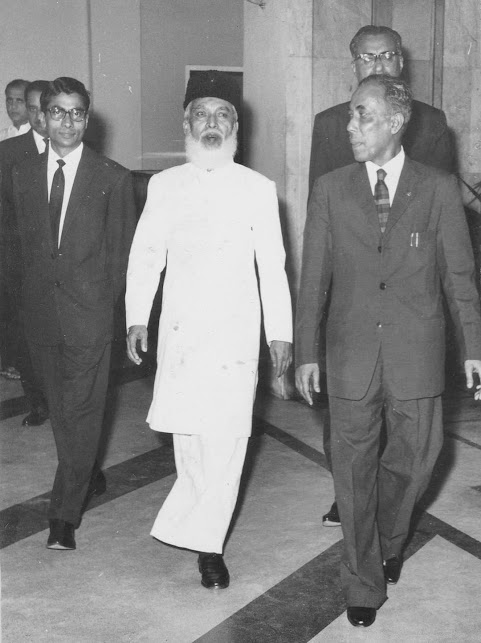
Hafizur Rahman (center) with Khuda Buksh (right)

After retirement, he became actively involved in furthering economic development in underprivileged areas in East Pakistan. As part of these efforts, he was appointed as an Honorary Adviser to Pakistan Industrial Credit and Investment Corporation (PICIC), with the specific task of overseeing its operations in East Pakistan. This appointment aimed to increase PICIC's assistance and support to less developed regions, aligning with Hafizur Rahman's expertise and experience as a former Central Minister and Finance Minister of East Pakistan.

After Bangladesh emerged as a new state, Hafizur Rahman continued to contribute to the development of Bangladesh's post-war broken economy under the Presidency of Ziaur Rahman.

== Commercial and industrial involvement ==
Outside of his government positions, Hafizur Rahman was involved in various commercial and industrial organizations.

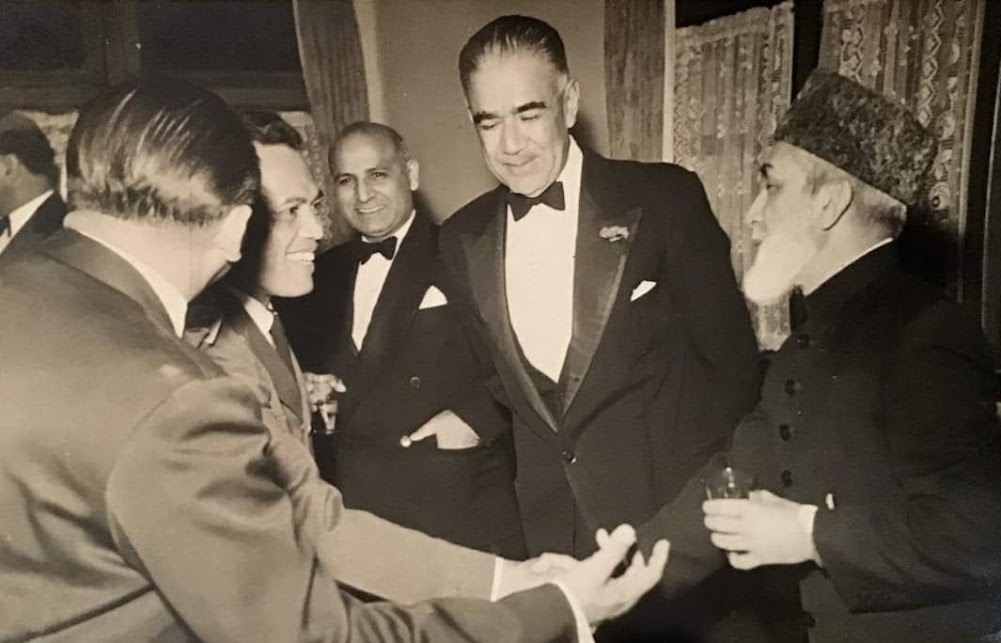
Hafizur Rahman (right) at a banquet with Haji Iftikhar Ahmed (center), Chairman of WPIDC

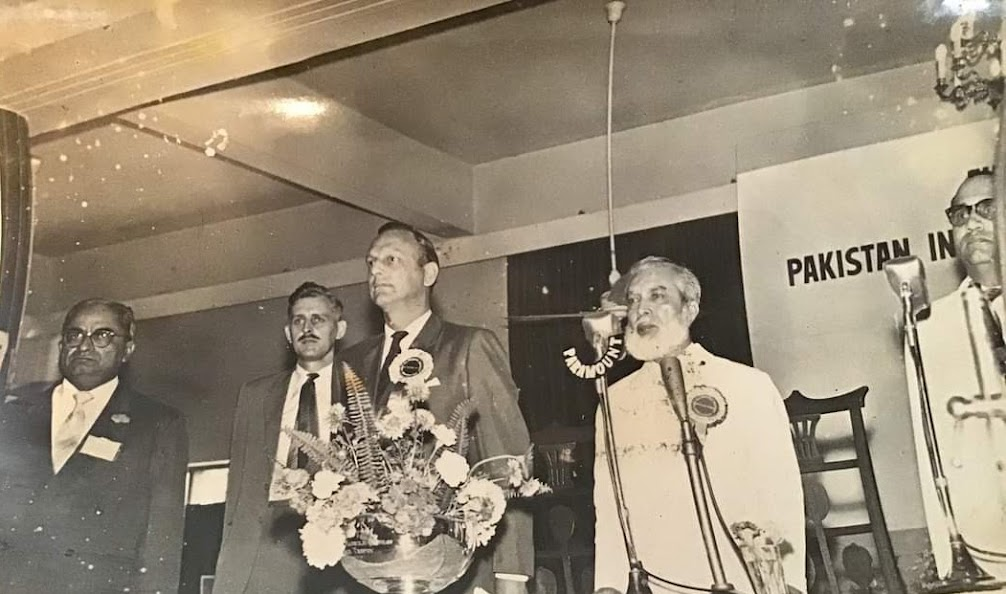
Hafizur Rahman with Joint Secretary Syed Osman Ali at a PIDC event

=== Positions ===
- Founder and Chairman of Great Eastern Insurance Company (1965–1972)
- Chairman of Alfa Tobacco till 1972
- Chairman of Tea Enquiry Committee, 1968
- Chairman of National Ceramic Industries of Pakistan Ltd
- Chairman of Pakistan Jute and Gunnies Exchange Ltd
- Chairman of Eastern Milk Products
- Chairman of Co-operative Union Ltd
- Chairman of Prices Enquiry Committee
- Chairman of Food and And Agriculture Council, Pakistan
- Chairman of Pakistan Insurance Corporation (1969–1970)
- Chairman of National Insurance Corporation (1972–1973)
- Vice- Chairman Industrial Promotion Services of Pakistan
- Director, State Bank of Pakistan (1966–1971)
- Director, National Bank of Pakistan
- Director, Investment Corporation of Pakistan (inception-1971)
- Director, Karnafully Rayon and Chemicals
- President of Dhaka University Alumni Association (1973–1975)

== Awards and recognition ==
- Sitara-e-Quaid-e-Azam (Star of the Great Leader) by the Government of Pakistan in March 1958
- Grand Cross of the Civil Order of Agriculture by Spain

== Personal life and legacy ==
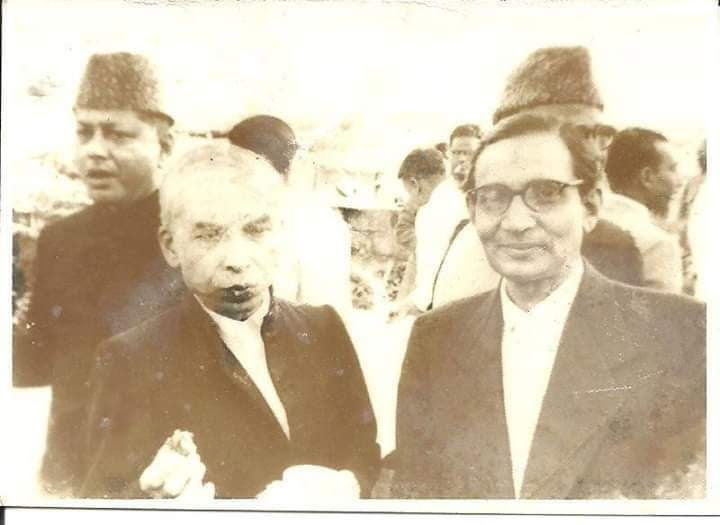
Hafizur Rahman and Abbasuddin Ahmed at a reception, 1956

Hafizur Rahman was an avid traveler and visited Europe, Japan, and the Middle East. His hobbies included reading and gardening. He was married to Anwara Begum and had two sons and four daughters. His son Anisur Rahman was a key member in developing the two-economy theory which led to the development of the 6-Point Programme presented by Sheikh Mujibur Rahman to the West Pakistan government during the struggle for independence. His daughter Husne Ara Kamal was the director at the Institute of Social Welfare and Research who married the son of renowned folk singer Abbasuddin Ahmed, Mustafa Kamal who later became Chief Justice of Bangladesh. His granddaughter Nashid Kamal is a vocalist, writer and widely regarded as a Nazrul exponent. Through his granddaughters Naeela Sattar and Nazeefa Monem marriages, Ismail Sattar, son of M. A. Sattar and ASM Mainuddin Monem, son of Abdul Monem are his grandson-in-laws. His great-granddaughter, Armeen Musa is a Grammy nominated singer-songwriter and composer. Hafizur Rahman died on 15 May 1984. His funeral was held at Tiptop Mosque in Dhaka.
