= Lloyds Commerce and Investment Cooperative Society Limited =

Non-bank financial institution

- Type: Cooperative
- Headquarters: Dhaka, Bangladesh
- Region served: Bangladesh
- Official language: Bengali

Lloyds Commerce and Investment Cooperative Society Limited (Bengali: লয়েডস কমার্স অ্যান্ড ইনভেস্টমেন্ট কো-অপারেটিভ সোসাইটি লিমিটেড) was a Bangladeshi non-bank financial institution. Prior to its failure the investment society had around 2,000 customers.

In 2015, the bank made national news when the managing director Md Firoz Kabir embezzled nearly Tk 1.40 billion from the institution by distributing the funds to himself and various non-members such as his daughter Rezwana Kabir, brother Nawroj Kabir, sister-in-law Sabira Banu, brother-in-law Kazi Mafizul Islam, cousin Syed Anwarul Nafis, friend Azizur Rahman, and his wife Sheli Rahman. It is suspected that he used the customers' money to purchase a second home in Malaysia and is now in hiding. A number of cases are also pending against Lloyds Commerce and Investment Co-operative Society and related company Chartered Credit Cooperative Limited.

== Embezzlement ==
A complaint of embezzlement has been made against Lloyds Commerce and Investment Cooperative Society Limited located in Motijheel of the capital.

With the help of Sherebangla Nagar Thana police, the member of the management council of the organization Md. Feroz Kabir and Azizur Rahman were arrested and handed over to Motijheel police station.

The investors have formed a committee with 12 active members to recover the deposits, and a number of members of the cooperatives have filed 18 cases against Firoz Kabir. Syed Anwarul Zakir, a former army official, and an uncle of Firoz Kabir, is the president of the committee. He sent a letter to the Department of Cooperatives asking for assistance about Firoz's bail and requested to suspend 18 cases on 4 August. He then said it was possible to recover money by opening the cooperatives again if Kabir was granted bail. He was released on bail and he and his family disappeared.

In January 2019, the Department of Cooperatives sent a letter to the Ministry of Home Affairs (Bangladesh) to restrict the top officials of the cooperatives from leaving the country, but the ministry only got passport details of six people. As a result, it could not be confirmed whether they are in the country or have gone abroad.

=== Victims ===
Kabir cheated many customers, including former army officials, members of parliament, and government officials.

- A prominent singer, Nashid Kamal, had invested Tk 140 million. Her father, former chief justice Musafa Kamal, had left the money for her and her siblings when he died in 2015.
- Mili Rahman, wife of Birshreshtha Matiur Rahman, had also invested money in the cooperatives. When asked about her investments, she expressed her concern about getting her money back. She said, "It is not important how much I had invested. Getting back the money is important. I have sought help from the Department of Cooperatives and the home ministry to get the money back, but to no avail."
- Khandkar Najibur Hossain, consultant of Metropolitan Life Insurance Limited, told Yugantar that he had deposited one crore in 2000 after selling the land and ancestral house. His sister Umm Habiba invested Tk 11 crore.
- Mojibur Rahman, a retired official of the Ministry of Agriculture, said that he has a fixed deposit of 73 lakh.
- Doctor Salma Ruby has invested about Tk 1.5 million in that institution.
