= Acharya Brojendra Nath Seal College =

State-government co-educational college in West Bengal, India

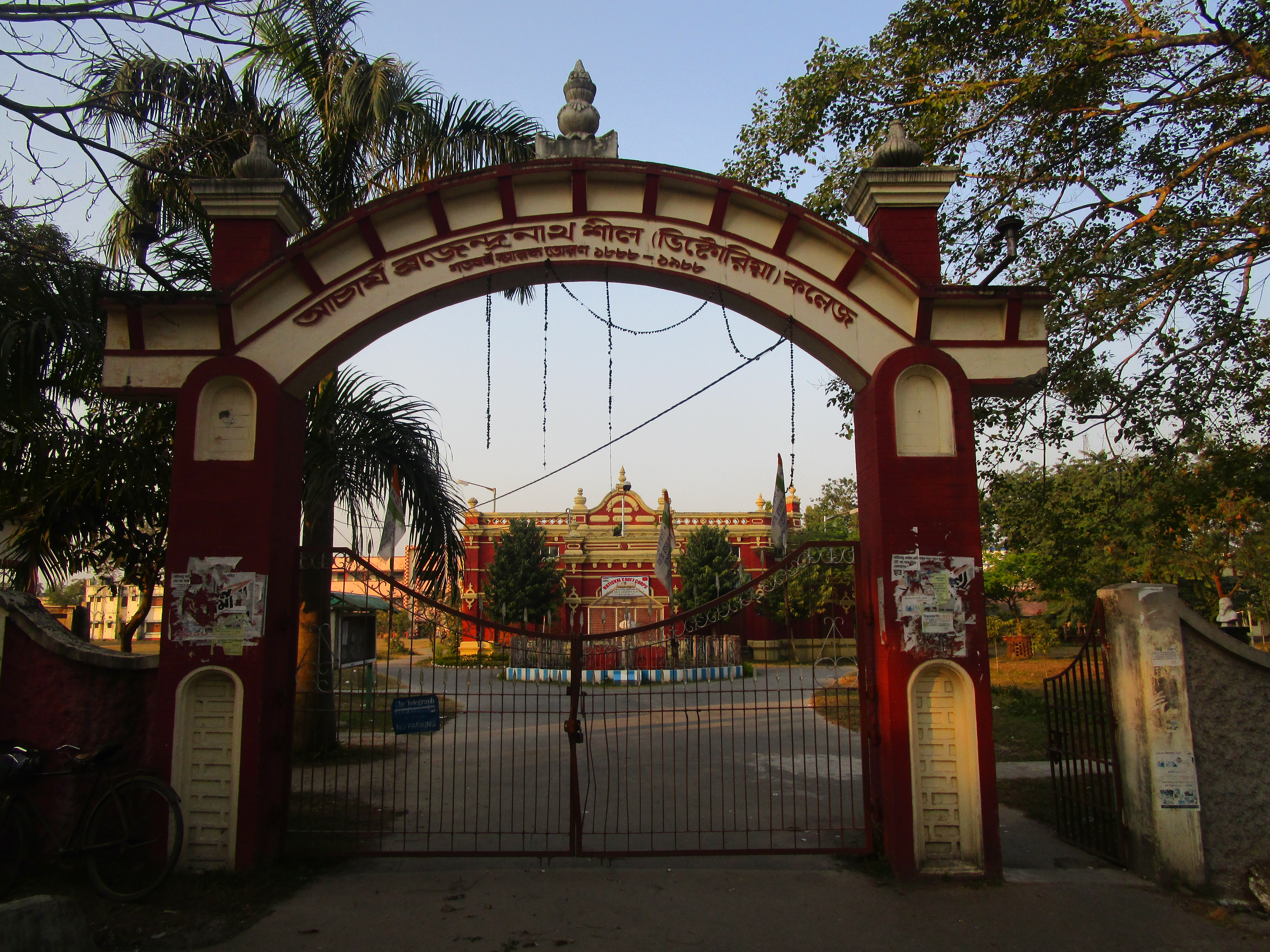
- Former name: Victoria College
- Motto: Education First; The Right For Dealing
- Type: state-government owned
- Established: 15 June 1888; 138 years ago
- Founder: Maharaja Nipendra Narayan
- Parent institution: State Ministry Of Education, Government of West Bengal
- Affiliations: Cooch Behar Panchanan Barma University
- Academic affiliations: NAAC Accredited with Grade 'A+' (Cycle 3)
- Principal: Dr. Nilay Ray
- Location: Beside Rashmela Ground, Cooch Behar, West Bengal, 736101, India; 26.320570°N 89.449081°E
- Campus: Urban
- Website: abnsealcollege.ac.in

Acharya Brojendra Nath Seal College popularly known as ABN Seal College, earlier Victoria College, is a state-government owned co-educational college in Cooch Behar, West Bengal, India. It was established in 1888 and offers undergraduate and postgraduate education. The college is affiliated to the Cooch Behar Panchanan Barma University and accredited as A+ by NAAC. The college has been conferred the "Centre of Excellence" status by the University Grants Commission.

== History ==
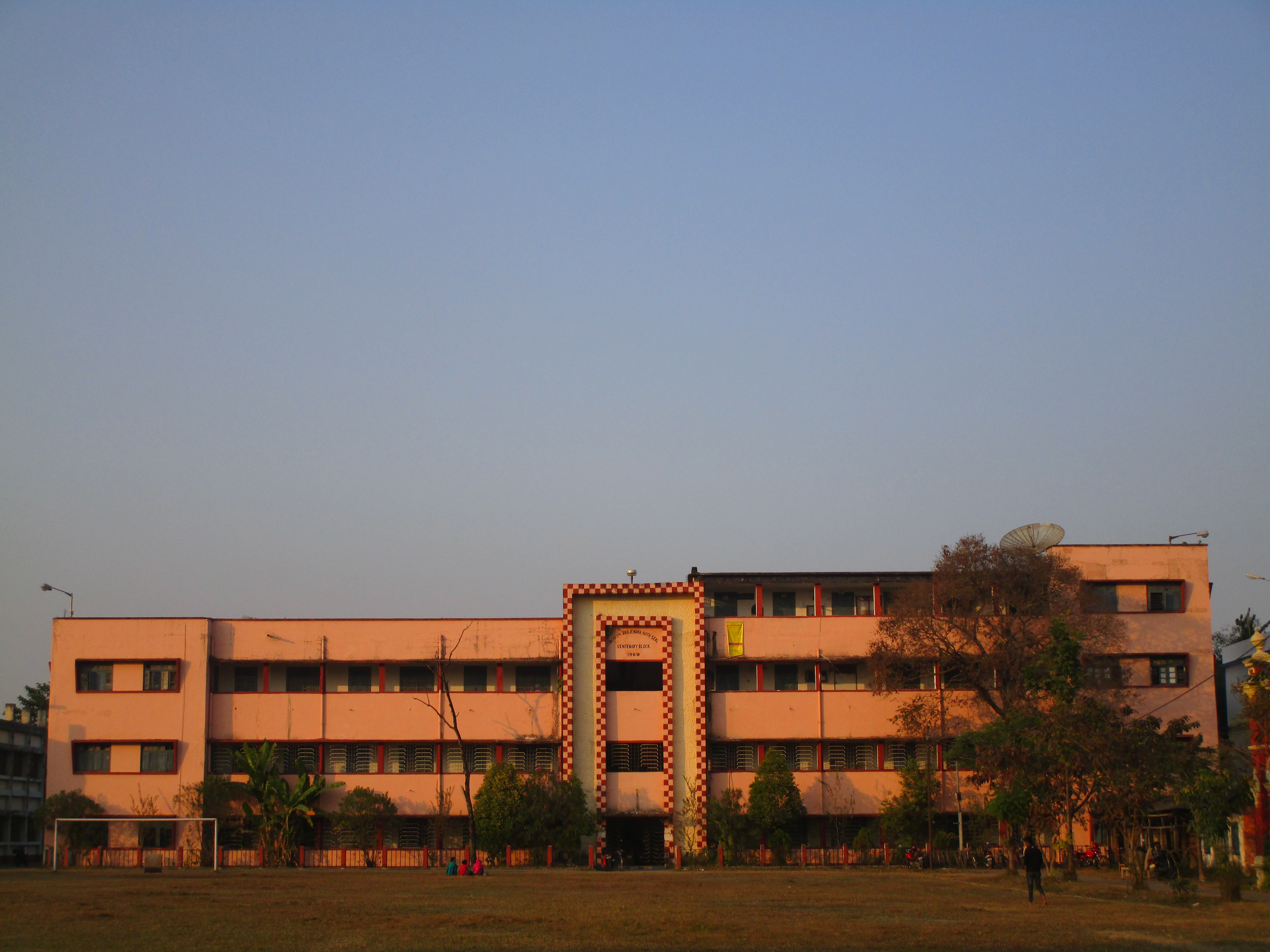
Satavisa Building

Acharya Brojendra Nath Seal College was established in 1888 as Victoria College by Maharaja Nripendra Narayan of the Cooch Behar State. The first principal was John Cornwallis Godley who in 1895 became the second principal of Aitchison College in Lahore. Later Maharaja Nripendra Narayan offered the post of principal to Acharya Brajendra Nath Seal, a Brahmo and philosopher, who remained in the post for eighteen years from 1896 to 1913. In 1950, when the state of Cooch Behar was merged into Union of India, the governance was passed to the Government of West Bengal. It was earlier affiliated to the University of Calcutta and University of North Bengal and is now affiliated to Cooch Behar Panchanan Barma University after the creation of the same. In 1970, it was renamed as Acharya Brojendra Nath Seal College.

== Facilities and campus ==
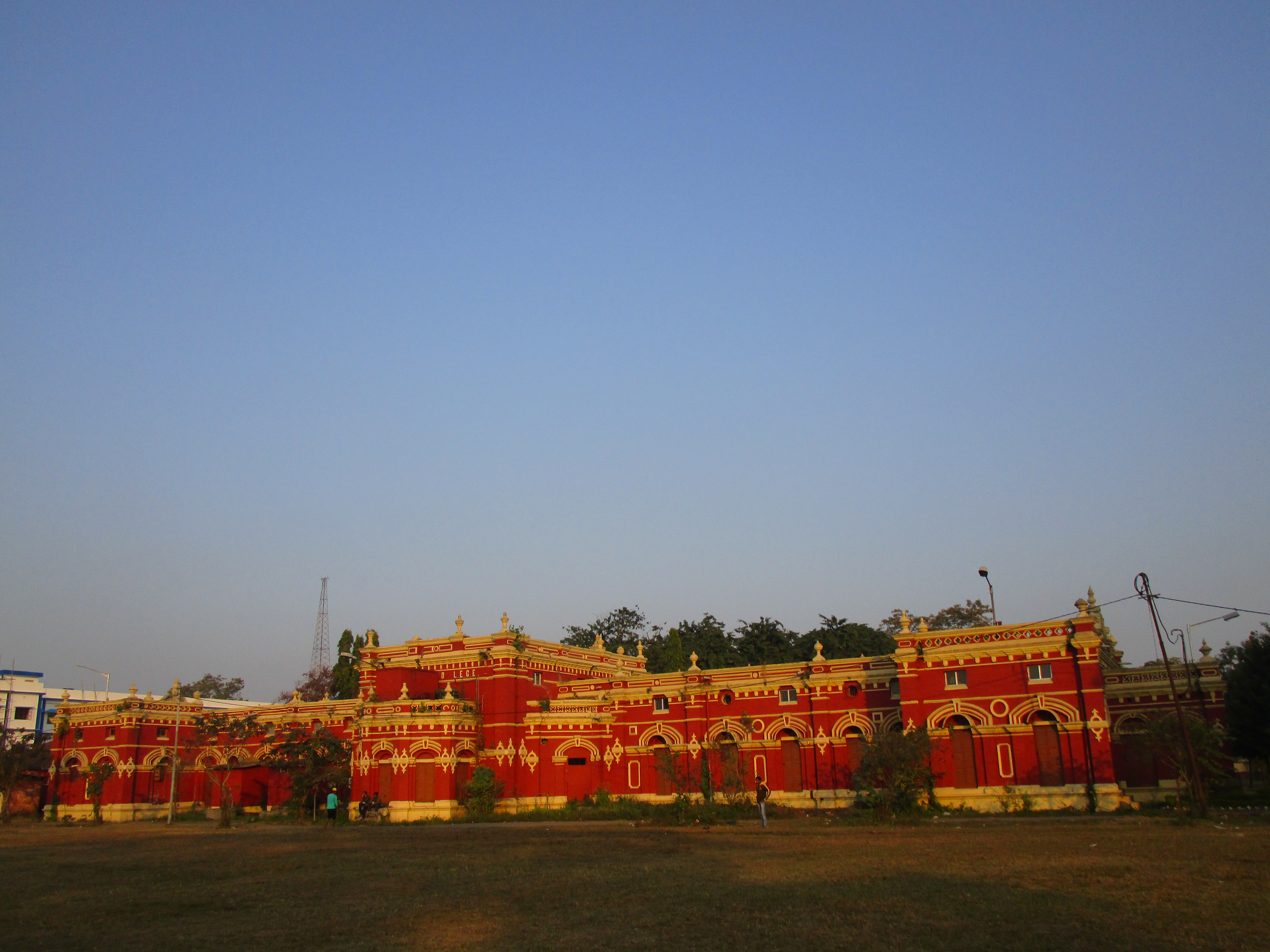
Brojendranath Shil College Building

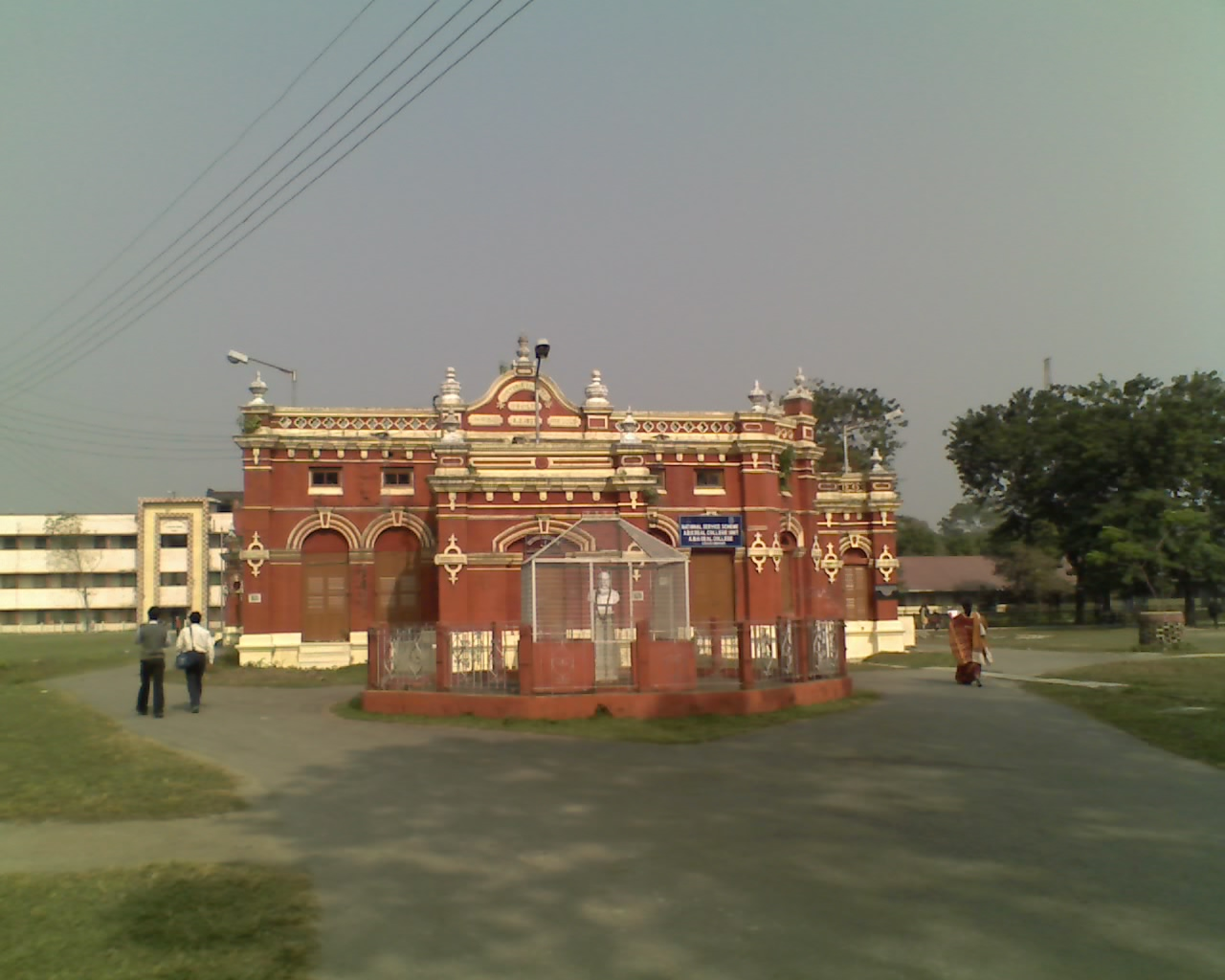
ABN Seal College Building

The college has a campus of 13.27 acres (53,700 m^{2}) and built-up area of 9032.96 sq. meters.

Acharya Brojendra Nath Seal College has a library with about 55,000 books, journals and periodicals in a two-storied building with an area of about 2,500 sq ft (230 m^{2}) with two reading rooms.

The college has hostels for both boys and girls. The Nripendra Narayan Memorial Boys' Hostel is the boys' hostel located right next to the college. Sister Nivedita Girls’ Hostel is the girls' hostel which is also located near the college campus.

== Notable alumni ==
- Shirshendu Mukhopadhyay, Indian Writer
- Maziruddin Ahmed (born 1898), Cooch Behar politician
- Bishnu Prasad Rabha, revolutionary, music composer and singer
- Panchanan Barma (1865–1935), reformer from Cooch Behar
- Abbasuddin Ahmed, (1901–1959), folk song composer and singer
- Amiya Bhushan Majumdar (1918–2001), Novelist
- Amar Roy Pradhan (1930 – 2013), Indian politician from All India Forward Bloc

== Notable faculty members ==
- Brajendra Nath Seal, first Indian Principal, 1896–1913
- Sadhu T.L. Vaswani, Principal, 1915–1917

== See also ==
- List of institutions of higher education in West Bengal
- Education in India
- Education in West Bengal
