= Masdar Hossain =

Masdar Hossain is a former district judge known for being the plaintiff in the landmark legal case Secretary, Ministry of Finance v. Masdar Hossain. He was the Speedy Trial Tribunal-1 Judge.

== Career ==
Hossain filed a petition with the Bangladesh Supreme Court calling for the separation of the administrative branch of government from the judicial branch according to Article 22 of the Constitution of Bangladesh. In May 1999, he secured a verdict from the High Court Division. Despite the verdict the process of separation could not be completed due to the reluctance of the executive branch to lose their judicial powers. The judicial period before 1999 has been referred to as Pre ‘Masder Hossain’ era.

Hossain was the Sirajganj district judge in 2007. He then served as the Inspector General of Registration.

In October 2008, Hossain, as judge of the Speedy Trial Tribunal-1, rejected the discharge petition of Abdus Salam Pintu, Mufti Abdul Hannan, and 20 others in the case filed over the 2004 Dhaka grenade attack targeting former Prime Minister Sheikh Hasina. In August 2009, Hossain sentenced Kamal Uddin, former Union Parishad chairman of Ruhitpur Union, to death for the murder of a Union Parishad member in 2006.

After the fall of the Sheikh Hasina led Awami League government Hossain met the newly appointed Chief Justice Syed Refaat Ahmed in September 2024 and hoped the new chief justice would finally separate the judicial and executive branches of government. In October 2024, he was included in the newly created Judicial Reform Commission of the Muhammad Yunus led interim government.
