= Chartered Credit Cooperative Limited =

Non-bank financial institution in Bangladesh

- Formation: 1991
- Type: Cooperative
- Headquarters: Dhaka, Bangladesh
- Region served: Bangladesh
- Official language: Bengali

Chartered Credit Cooperative Limited (Bengali: চার্টার্ড ক্রেডিট কো-অপারেটিভ লিমিটেড) was a non-bank financial institution in Bangladesh. It had been operating since 1991. The number of customers of Chartered Credit Cooperative Limited was 4,789 people prior to its demise.

In 2015, the bank made national news when the managing director Md Firoz Kabir embezzled nearly Tk 1.40 billion from the institution by distributing the funds to himself and various non-members such as his daughter Rezwana Kabir, brother Nawroj Kabir, sister-in-law Sabira Banu, brother-in-law Kazi Mafizul Islam, cousin Syed Anwarul Nafis, friend Azizur Rahman, and his wife Sheli Rahman. It is suspected that he used the customers' money from Chartered Credit Cooperative Limited and related Lloyds Commerce and Investment Cooperative Society Limited to purchase a second home in Malaysia and is now in hiding.

== Embezzlement ==
A complaint of embezzlement of 1.34 billion BDT from four thousand customers has been made against the Chartered Credit Cooperative Limited located in Motijheel, Dhaka.

With the help of Sherebangla Nagar Thana police, the member of the management council of the organization Md. Feroz Kabir and Azizur Rahman were arrested and handed over to Motijheel police station.

It is assumed that the members of the management board have laundered the money of depositors. They are the President of the Board of Directors Kazi Mofizul Islam, Vice President Umm Habiba, members Mrs Shaili, Shamima Begum, Rumaisha Shabnam, Rumaisha Maryam, Sabira Banu, SA Mateen, Rabiul Islam and Rezwana Kabir.

The investors have formed a committee with 12 active members to recover the deposits, and a number of members of the cooperatives have filed 18 cases against Firoz Kabir. Syed Anwarul Zakir, a former army official, and an uncle of Firoz Kabir, is the president of the committee. He sent a letter to the Department of Cooperatives asking for assistance about Firoz's bail and requested to suspend 18 cases on 4 August. He then said it was possible to recover money by opening the cooperatives again if Kabir was granted bail. He was released on bail and he and his family disappeared.

In January 2019, the Department of Cooperatives sent a letter to the Ministry of Home Affairs (Bangladesh) to restrict the top officials of the cooperatives from leaving the country, but the ministry only got passport details of six people. As a result, it could not be confirmed whether they are in the country or have gone abroad.

== Victims ==
About 4,500 customers, including former army officials, members of parliament, and government officials.

- Singer Abdul Jabbar's wife Shaheen Jabbar kept Tk 1.53 million in Chartered Credit Cooperative Limited
- Deputy Inspector General of police Masud Mia has invested about 9 million in that company
- Retired Deputy Inspector General of police Sajjad Hossain kept Tk 250,000 in chartered credit.
- Retired Additional Deputy Inspector General of police JTI Talukdar is trying to recover about TK 1.2 million invested in the same company.
- Investor Major (retired) Habibur Rahman told Jugantar that he sold the flat and placed the money in chartered credit. His wife and relatives also kept money there.
- Former GM of Bangladesh Biman Abdur Rashid said that he has Tk 3.5 million in chartered credit
- Dalil Uddin Khan, the former GM of Bangladesh Biman, said that his daughter, son, brother, office peon, three work brothers, and himself have 6 million in chartered credit.
- Maulana Md. Yunus, Resident of Mohammadpur, kept Tk 1.5 million in chartered credit for the sale of land.
- Bimal Chandra, senior GM of Mate Life Insurance Company, said that in December 2015, he placed 4 million in chartered credit.
