= Secretary, Ministry of Finance v. Masdar Hossain =

Case regarding the separation of powers in Bangladesh

- Court: Supreme Court of Bangladesh

Court membership
- Judges sitting: Chief Justice Mustafa Kamal; Justice Latifur Rahman; Justice Bimalendu Bikash Roy Choudhury; Justice Mahmudul Amin Choudhury

Secretary, Ministry of Finance v Masdar Hossain (1999) 52 DLR (AD) 82 is a landmark case decided by the Appellate Division of the Supreme Court of Bangladesh concerning the separation of powers. It is popularly known as the Masdar Hossain case.

== Facts ==
In 1995, a writ petition was filed by Masdar Hossain, a district judge, on behalf of 441 other judges of the subordinate judiciary. The petition put forward the following points:-

- Including the judicial service under the executive branch's control was ultra vires.
- Chapter II of Part VI of the constitution ensured lower courts were separate from the executive.
- Judges of lower courts could not be subject to an Administrative Tribunal of the executive.

The High Court Division ruled in favor of the petition with a 12-point directive in 1997. The government appealed to the Appellate Division of the Supreme Court.

== Judgment ==
In 1999, the Appellate Division reversed parts of the High Court Division's ruling but upheld the 12-point directive. It issued a further 12-point directive. The Appellate Division called for the formation of an independent judicial commission to select judiciary members, deal with matters of judicial salaries, and manage discipline. The Supreme Court ruled that the Constitution provided a framework for judicial independence.

== Significance ==
The verdict led to the formation of the Bangladesh Judicial Service Commission. It was implemented by Chief Advisor Fakhruddin Ahmed during the caretaker administration in 2007.

== See also ==
- Judicial precedent
