= Nashid Kamal =

Bangladeshi singer

- নাশিদ কামাল
- Born: 19 March 1958 (age 68); London, England, United Kingdom
- Education: PhD (medical demography)
- Alma mater: University of Dhaka; Carleton University; London School of Hygiene & Tropical Medicine
- Occupations: Singer, writer and professor of demography
- Known for: Being a Nazrul exponent
- Notable work: The Glass Bangles, The Return of Laili
- Spouse(s): Hossain Md Musa (Divorced); Anis Waiz (1993-2002 till his death)
- Children: Armeen Musa, Aashna Musa
- Parents: Mustafa Kamal (father); Husne Ara Kamal (mother)
- Relatives: Abbas Uddin Ahmed (grandfather); Mustafa Zaman Abbasi (uncle); Ferdausi Rahman (aunt); Maziruddin Ahmed (great granduncle)
- Awards: Nazrul Award (2009), Nazrul Padak (2014)

Nashid Kamal (born 19 March 1958) is a Bangladeshi vocalist, writer and professor of demography. She is the eldest granddaughter of Bengali folk singer Abbasuddin Ahmed. Kamal is widely regarded as a Nazrul exponent. For her contributions to Nazrul's works, she has received awards including the Nazrul Award from the Nazrul Academy in 2009 and Nazrul Padak from the Nazrul Institute in 2014.

== Background ==
Kamal, the eldest of three children, was born in London, England to parents Mustafa Kamal and Husne Ara Kamal. Her father was a judge and served as the Chief Justice of Bangladesh. Her mother was a poet, philanthropist and professor. She was the Chairman of the Department of Social Welfare at Dhaka University before she took her retirement. She has two sisters, Naeela Sattar and Nazeefa K. Monem. Her uncle, Mustafa Zaman Abbasi, is a Bangladeshi musicologist and aunt, Ferdausi Rahman, is a singer . At the age of two, Nashid Kamal moved with her parents to Bangladesh (erstwhile East Pakistan), her mother country, to live permanently.

Kamal started singing at a young age. On 25 December 1964, she appeared on Pakistan Television (PTV), East Pakistan Centre, which is now Bangladesh Television (BTV) as a child singer on its inauguration day. Apart from studying, she started learning music from various notable gurus including Ustad P.C. Gomes, Ustad Akther Shadmani, Ustad Quader Zameeree and Pandit Jasraj Besides learning music and singing, she became a debater and television presenter. Kamal was awarded with the Best Speaker prize in 1976, when she participated in the first ever TV debate competition in Bangladesh called Torko Jukti Torko.

Kamal married Dr. Anis Waiz in 1993, who served in the Bangladesh Army and retired as a major general. He died in 2002. She has two daughters, Armeen Musa and Aashna Musa from her first husband Hossain Md. Musa. Armeen, a singer-songwriter herself, conducts the choir Ghaasphoring. Aashna is a lawyer/civil servant and resides in the U.K. Nashid Kamal lives in Dhaka, Bangladesh.

=== Education ===
Kamal attended the Holy Cross Girls' High School, and stood 7th in the merit list for girls in the Secondary School Certificate (SSC) examination in 1973. In 1975, she sat for Higher Secondary Examination (HSC) from the Holy Cross College, and stood 2nd in the combined merit list. She studied statistics for her BSc (Hons) degree at the University of Dhaka, and passed with a first-class-first in 1980 (record marks). Subsequently, Kamal went on to Carleton University, Ottawa, Ontario in Canada to do her MSc in mathematics, and achieved the degree in 1982. Kamal attended the London School of Hygiene & Tropical Medicine (LSHTM) at Camden for a doctoral degree in Medical Demography, and was awarded with the PhD in 1996.

== Career ==
=== Researcher ===
Nashid Kamal's professional career as a researcher started in 1983, when she joined ICDDR.B. She worked there for three years. She had, also, been a consultant to UNFPA in Bangladesh (1999) and Sudan (2001). She has more than 25 publications in peer-reviewed journals including the widely acknowledged health journal – The Lancet. Her areas of interest are fertility decline in developing countries, multilevel regression, contraceptive use, shift in garment works due to MFA, RTI of women in the urban slums in Bangladesh, HIV/ AIDS, association of education of women with their uptake of health benefits.

=== Academic ===
Kamal joined the Institute of Statistical Research and Training (ISRT) at Dhaka University in 1986. Later, she joined Independent University, Bangladesh (IUB) as the head of department of population-environment in 1996 and worked there until 2010, when she joined North South University as a professor of biostatistics. and BRAC Business School as adjunct professor until 2014. She is currently working as an adjunct professor at the IEDCR, Ministry of Health and Family Welfare, Government of Bangladesh. Nashid Kamal has been a visiting scholar in the Department of Anthropology, Penn State University (1999), Department of Sociology, Southern Illinois University (2001) and Department of Statistical Sciences, University College London (2008).

=== Writer ===
Nashid Kamal has sixteen published books, 13 as a writer and three others as an editor. She writes both in Bengali and English. She has written fictions (novels and short stories), poems, autobiographies, articles and essays. She, also, has translated notable Bengali literary works in English mostly from Nazrul. The Return of Laili is her most talked about book series, which is a translation of Nazrul's popular songs. Chokrobak is another noteworthy translation that comprises twenty two romantic poems of Nazrul. Her other translations include Biography of Kazi Nazrul Islam, a biographical on Bangladesh's National Poet originally written by Rafiqul Islam, and My Life in Melody, an autobiography of Abbas Uddin Ahmed. Jui Phuler Verandah and Rideau Nodir Dharey are Kamal's famed autobiographies that feature her life events in home and abroad. The Glass Bangles, written in English, is a novel about a Bangladeshi Sylheti girl married to someone living in London. Ajibon Bosonto is one of her favourite books that is a collection of fourteen short stories. Chiro Unnoto Momo Sheer and Ei Achi Ei Nai are two books of collected articles edited by Kamal that feature her parents, Justice Mustafa Kamal and Professor Husne Ara Kamal, respectively. The Garden of Errors is another collection of articles written by Kamal herself, and includes selected writings published in popular daily and weekly newspapers and magazines like the People, Holiday, Daily Star and Probe since 1972. Her latest book is published by Journeyman in 2021. It is titled 'Chasing Dreams' an autobiography of Md. Hafizur Rahman edited by Nashid Kamal (maternal grandfather).

=== Vocalist ===
Nashid Kamal is singing for over four decades. She is widely known for her reputation as a fine singer of Nazrul Shongeet and Bengali Folk songs. She is also a classical and semi-classical music artist. Besides, she also sings Urdu Ghazals. Apart from singing in Bengali and Urdu, she has sung in many other foreign languages including Japanese, Chinese, Rumanian and Turkish. Kamal has eleven recorded musical albums to her credit, composed of Nazrul Geeti, Ghazals and Folk songs. She has been a regular performer in various Radio and Television stations in Bangladesh and India since she started singing as a child artist. She has performed in many stage shows in India, Bangladesh, Pakistan, Japan, Turkey, Romania, the US, the UK and Canada. In 1989, as Bangladeshi delegate she performed in the inaugural session of Salt Lake Stadium, Kolkata, India sharing the stage with Manna De, Sandhya Mukhopadhay, Lata Mungeshkar, among others. In 2009 she went as a Bangladeshi delegate to sing in the folk festival in Uzbekistan.She has performed in the 'Bongomela' in the US (2013, 2018) and Nazrul Shommelon in the US (2018).

== Awards ==
- 1969 Best student of the school Award from Little jewels School, Dhaka, Bangladesh.
- 1976 Torko Jukti Torko Best Speaker Award, BTV
- 1989 Nattosabha best singer award 1989, Bangladesh
- 2011 ATN Bangla Lifetime achievement Award
- 2016 Wings Award for leadership, Dhaka, Bangladesh
- 2014 Inner Wheel Award for leadership, Dhaka
- 2017 Channel I Music Award, Nazrul songs (Critic Award), Bangladesh
- 2017 Michael Madhusudan Dutta Award, Kolkata, India (for Nazrul translation)
- 2009: Nazrul Award by Nazrul Academy, Bangladesh
- 2014: Nazrul Padak by Nazrul Institute, Bangladesh
- 2014: Nazrul Padak given by Churulia Nazrul Academy, India
- 2011: City Cell Channel I Music Award by Critic award, Bangladesh
- 2017 Channel I Music Award in Nazrul songs, Bangladesh
- 2017 Mosharraf Hossain Literary Award, Bangladesh
- 2017 Michael Madhusudan award for translations of Nazrul, Kolkata, India
- 2018 Jodhpur Park festival Anannya Award, Kolkata, India
- 2018 Michael Madhusudan music award, Kolkata, India.
- 2018 Choyon Literary Award, gold medal, Dhaka, Bangladesh
- 2019 Uttara Rotary Club Lifetime Award
- 2019 Sharthok Telefilm Lifetime Award
- 2021 SAARC Women's award

== Grants and scholarships ==
- Research Assistantship, Dept of Mathematics and Statistics, Carleton University, Ottawa, Canada. 1981–1982
- Short Course Grant, East West University, USA. 1990
- Overseas Student's Grant, LSHTM, UK. 1992–1996
- Simon Population Fellowship, UK. 1994
- Mellon Foundation Award, USA. Summer 2001
- AIBS Award, USA. Summer 2001
- CAS Award, ICSB Biostatisticians 2008
- IUSSP Grant, Morocco. 2009
- Visiting scholar in: Penn State University (1999), Southern Illinois University(2001), University College London (2008)

== Works ==
=== Bibliography ===
==== Fiction ====
- Ajibon Bosonto (Spring Forever). Short stories. Dhaka, Bangladesh: Annoy Publishers. 2005
- Glass Bangles. Novel. Dhaka, Bangladesh: Adorn Publications. 2011

==== Autobiography ====
- Jui Phuler Verandah (Balcony of Jui). Dhaka, Bangladesh: Annanya Publications. 2002
- Rideau Nodir Dharey (By the River Rideau). Dhaka, Bangladesh: Annanya Publications. 2009

==== Essay ====
- The Garden of Errors. Dhaka, Bangladesh: Adorn Publications. 2014
- Life's lyrics, India, Bihaan Publishers 2019.

==== Translations ====
- The Return of Laili. Translation of Nazrul's songs. Dhaka, Bangladesh: Adorn Publications. 2010
- Biography of Kazi Nazrul Islam. Nazrul's biography. Rafiqul Islam. Dhaka, Bangladesh: Nazrul Institute. 2013
- My Life in Melodies. Abbas Uddin's autobiography. Abbasuddin Ahmed. Dhaka, Bangladesh: Adorn Publications. 2014
- Chokrobak (The Swan). Translation of Nazrul Islam's book. Dhaka, Bangladesh: Nazrul Institute. 2014
- The Return of Laili 2. Translation of Nazrul Islam's songs. Dhaka, Bangladesh: Adorn Publications. 2016
- `The path of the comet and other essays' Translation of the editorials of Nazrul Islam published in his magazine Dhumketu. Nazrul Institute 2018
- `Yearning Eyes' Translation of the book Chokher Chatok (lyrics) by Kazi Nazrul Islam, Anannya Publishers, 2019

==== Edited ====
- Ei Achi Ei Nai (Temporary existence). Collection of articles. Dhaka, Bangladesh: Probe Publications. 2013
- Chiro Unnoto Momo Shir (Head high at all time). Collection of articles. Dhaka, Bangladesh: Osgood Publications. 2014
- `Chasing Dreams' Autobiography of Md. Hafizur Rahman. Journeyman, 2021

=== Discography ===
''Anchol Bhora Phul'' (Nazrul Geeti)

- Released: 1999
- Format: CD
- Label: Bengal Foundation

''Nodir Kul Nai'' (Folk songs of Abbas Uddin Ahmed)

- Released: 2003
- Format: CD
- Label: Sound Tech.

''Albeli Naar'' (Urdu Ghazal)

- Released: 2003
- Format: CD
- Label: Sound Tech.

''Biroher Gulbagey'' (Nazrul Geeti)

- Released: 2008
- Format: CD
- Label: Laser Vision

''Elo Phul Doul'' (Nazrul Geeti)

- Released: 2009
- Format: CD
- Label: Commitment Products

''Elo Sobe Raat'' (Islamic songs)

- Released: 2009
- Format: CD
- Label: Laser Vision
- Writer: Kazi Nazrul Islam & others

''Kajol Bhromora'' (Folk songs)

- Released: 2011
- Format: CD
- Label: Prime CDs, Kolkata

''Phulero Jalsay'' (Won Channel I City Cell Music Award in Nazrul category in 2011.)

- Released: 2011
- Format: CD
- Label: Laser Vision
- Writer: Kazi Nazrul Islam
- Producer: Almas Ali

''Valobaso More Gaan'' (Modern songs)

- Released: 2011
- Format: CD
- Label: Laser Vision

''Jao Tumi Phire'' (Nazrul Geeti)

- Released: 2012
- Format: CD
- Label: Laser Vision

''Gaane Gaane Nazrul Jiboni'' (Nazrul Geeti. 12 songs and one poem from Nazril translated in English by the singer. She also narrates the life events of Nazrul – beginning to death – in between the songs.)

- Released: 2016
- Format: CD
- Label: ME Label
- Writer: Kazi Nazrul Islam
