= Ferdausi Rahman =

Bangladeshi singer (born 1941)

Ferdausi Rahman ফেরদৌসী রহমান
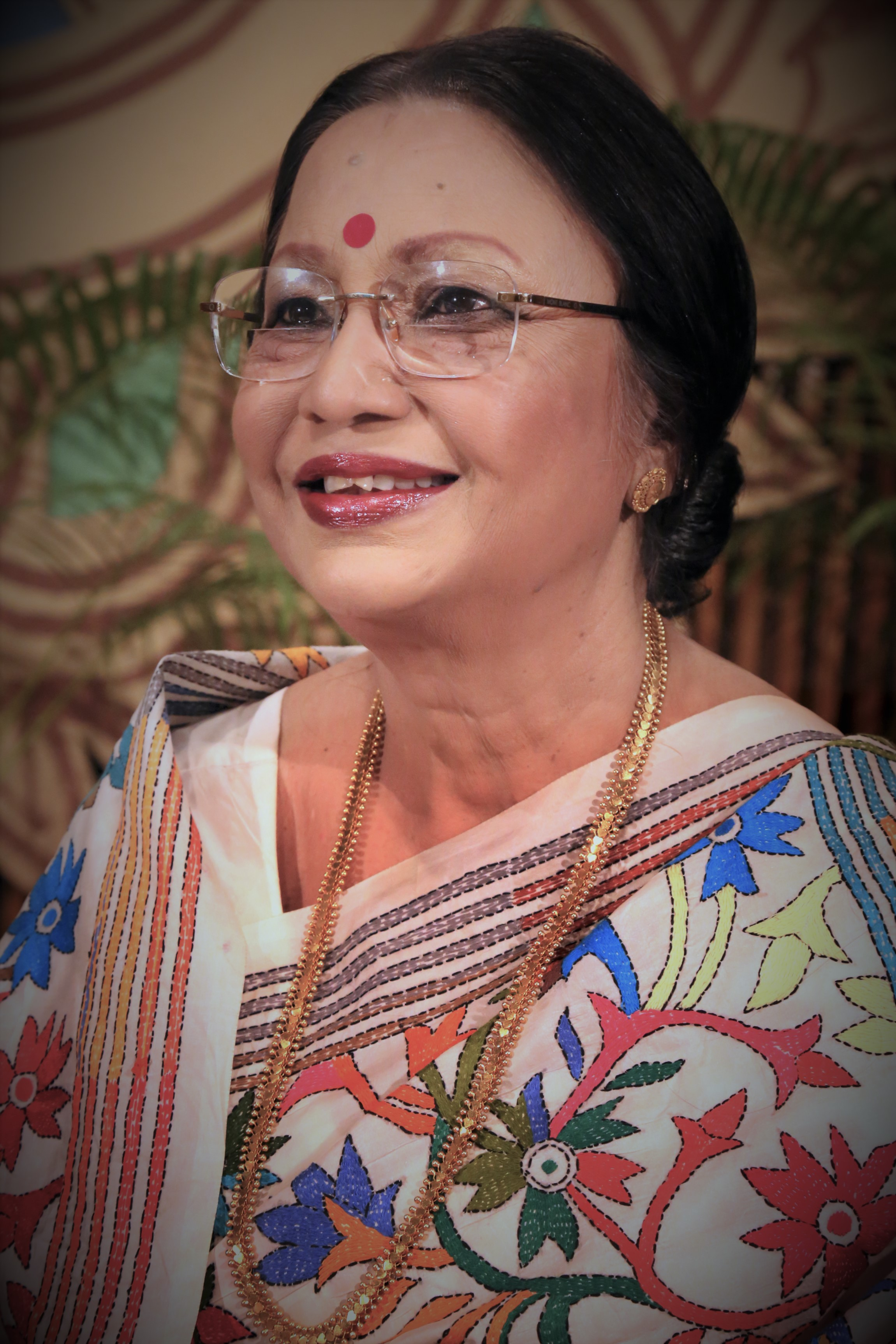
- Rahman in 2017

Background information
- Born: Ferdausi Begum; 28 June 1941 (age 85); Cooch Behar, Bengal Presidency, British India
- Genres: Bhawaiya (folk), Nazrul Geeti, Ghazal
- Occupations: Singer, Music director
- Instruments: Vocals, Harmonium
- Years active: 1955–present
- Website: ferdausi.com

Ferdausi Rahman (née Begum; born 28 June 1941) is a Bangladeshi playback singer. She sang some popular film songs for Pakistani films also in the 1960s especially working with the music composer Robin Ghosh in the film Chakori (1967). She was awarded Ekushey Padak in 1977 and Independence Day Award in 1995 by the government of Bangladesh. She also got the 2015 Bangladesh National Film Award for Lifetime Achievement. She remains the only female to receive the Bangladesh National Film Award for Best Music Director, for the film Megher Onek Rong (1976).

== Early life ==
Ferdausi Begum was born to folk singer Abbasuddin Ahmed. She had two elder brothers, Justice Mustafa Kamal (d. 2015) and singer Mustafa Zaman Abbasi (d. 2025). Her nieces, Nashid Kamal, Samira Abbasi and Sharmini Abbasi, are also singers as is her grand niece Armeen Musa.

== Career ==
Rahman participated as a child artiste in radio programmes. In 1955, she first sang for the radio as an adult artiste. The first released movie where she sang as a playback singer was Ehtesham's Ei Desh Tomar Amar under the music direction of Khan Ataur Rahman in 1959, followed by Asiya in 1960. Her father was one of the music directors of the film.

In 1964, her song was broadcast on the newly established Pakistan Television in erstwhile East Pakistan (now Bangladesh). Her children's program Esho Gaan Shikhi on Bangladesh Television teaches children about music and has been running for 44 years. She is known as Gaaner Khalamoni (Aunt of Song) for this program. NTV has been airing a program of her songs presented by contemporary artistes.

== Awards and honors ==
- Lahore Cine Journalist Awards (1963)
- President's Pride of Performance Award (1965) by the President of Pakistan
- Bangladesh National Film Award for Best Music Director (1976)
- Bachsas Awards (1976)
- Ekushey Padak (1977)
- Independence Day Award (1995)
- Nasiruddin Gold Medal
- A crest as part of the Gunijon Shongbordhona programme (2009)
- Lifetime Achievement Award 2008 at the Meril Prothom Alo Awards.

== Personal life ==
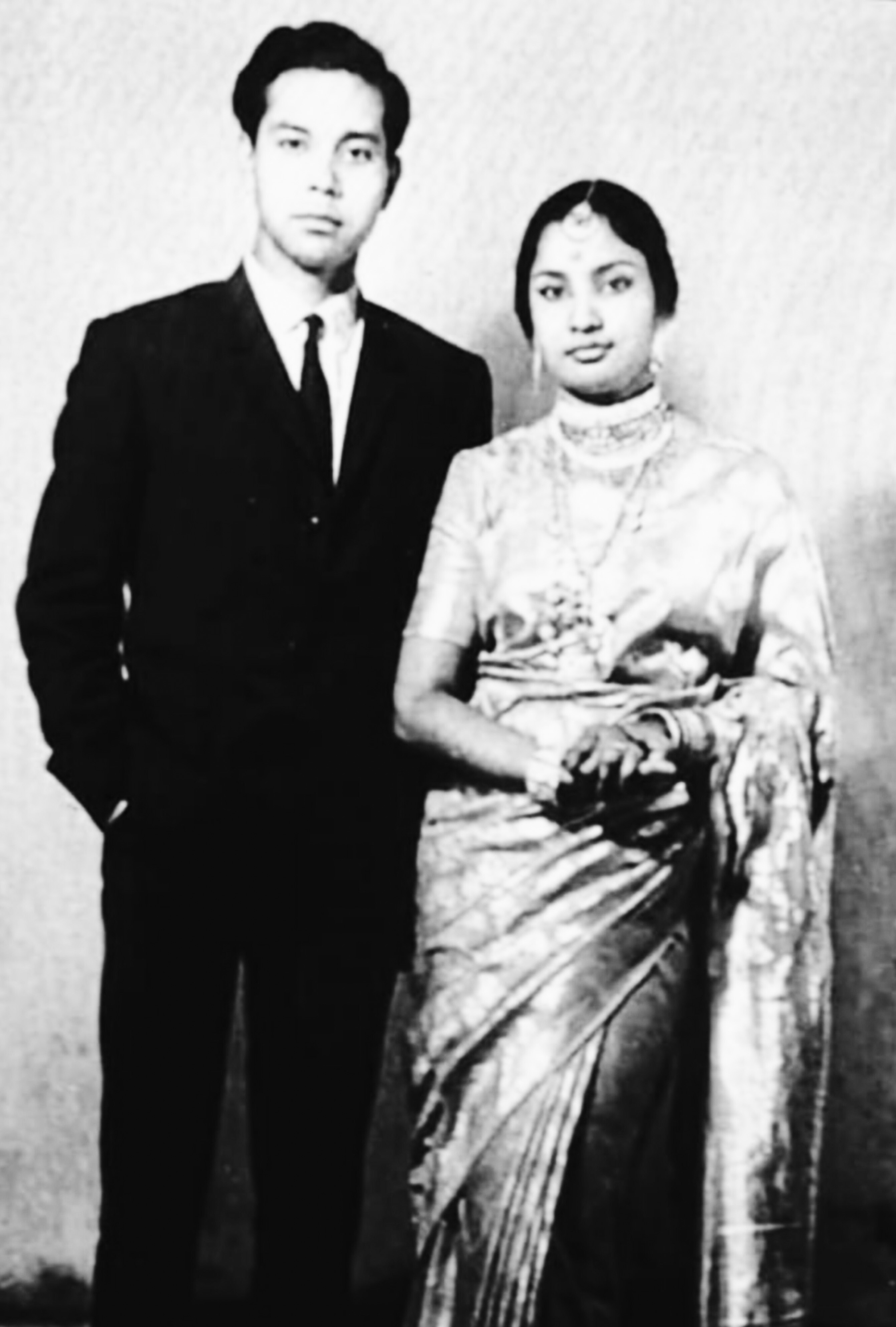
Rahman with her husband at her wedding in Shahbagh Hotel, Dhaka (1966)

Rahman was married to Rezaur Rahman, an engineer and industrialist, from 1966 until his death in 2024. They had two sons, Rubaiyat Rahman and Razin Rahman.

== Film songs ==
| Year | Film | Song | Composer(s) | Songwriter(s) | Co-artist(s) |
|---|---|---|---|---|---|
| 1961 | Harano Din | "Ami Rupnogorer Rajkonna" | Robin Ghosh | N/A | solo |
| 1962 | Jowar Elo | "Nishi Jaga Chand Hase" | Dhir Mansur Ali | Mohammad Mohsin | solo |
| 1964 | Sangam (Urdu) | "Kitne Suhaane Rangeen" | Khan Ataur Rahman | Azizul Haque Aziz | solo |
| 1965 | Kaajal | "Yeh Aarzoo, Jawaan Jawaan" | Subal Das | Suroor Barabankvi | solo |
| 1966 | Begaana | "Main Tujhse Mohabbat Karta Hoon" | Robin Ghosh | Shair Siddiqui | Nazir Baig |
| 1966 | Begaana | "Yeh Pyaar Ki Saugat Hain" | Robin Ghosh | Shair Siddiqui | solo |
| 1966 | Daak Babu | "Ogo Tumi Dure Theke" | Ali Hossain | Mohammad Moniruzzaman | Syed Abdul Hadi |
| 1966 | Daak Babu | "Chupi Chupu Kachhe Ese" | Ali Hossain | Mohammad Moniruzzaman | solo |
| 1966 | Daak Babu | "Dole Dol Dolna Dole" | Ali Hossain | Mohammad Moniruzzaman | solo |
| 1966 | Gunai Bibi | "O Kokil Daiko Na" | Satya Saha | Abdul Hai Mashreki | solo |
| 1967 | Chaowa Paowa | "Kichhu Aage Hole Khoti Ki Chhilo" | Satya Saha | Mohammad Moniruzzaman | Mahmudun Nabi |
| 1968 | Aparichita | "Tomader Ei Rong Mohole" | Satya Saha | Masud Karim | solo |
| 1969 | Neel Akasher Niche | "Gaan Hoye Ele" | Satya Saha | Gazi Mazharul Anwar | solo |
| 1970 | Binimoy | "Kichhu Bola Jayna" | Satya Saha | Gazi Mazharul Anwar | solo |
| 1970 | Chhoddobeshi | "Ei Neel Neel Sei Nirjoner" | Satya Saha | Gazi Mazharul Anwar | solo |
| 1970 | Jog Biyog | "Bolaka Mon Harate Chay" | Subal Das | Gazi Mazharul Anwar | solo |
| 1970 | Ka Kha Ga Gha Umo | "Shaluk Shaluk Jhiler Jole" | Altaf Mahmud | Gazi Mazharul Anwar | solo |
| 1970 | Ka Kha Ga Gha Umo | "Amar Jhumko Latar Bajubondhe" | Altaf Mahmud | Gazi Mazharul Anwar | solo |
| 1970 | Modhu Milon | "Keno Ami Osohay Aaj" | Bashir Ahmed | Syed Shamsul Haque, Masud Karim | solo |
| 1970 | Modhu Milon | "Chhaya Hoye Tobu Pashe Roibo" | Bashir Ahmed | Shahidul Islam | solo |
| 1970 | Rong Bodlay | "Amar Naam Soniya" | Satya Saha | Gazi Mazharul Anwar | Satya Saha |
| 1970 | Rong Bodlay | "Jokhon Chhilem Ekla" | Satya Saha | Gazi Mazharul Anwar | solo |
| 1972 | Manusher Mon | "Gaaner Kotha" | Satya Saha | Gazi Mazharul Anwar | solo |
| 1972 | Nijere Haraye Khuji | "Sarabela Mon Jeno Kare" | Karim Shahabuddin | | solo |
| 1974 | Bichar | "Bolbo Na Go, Sei Kothati" | Anwar Parvez | Gazi Mazharul Anwar | solo |
| 1976 | Cholo Ghor Bandhi | "Ogo Bosonto Koto Juge Juge" | Khandaker Nurul Alam | Gazi Mazharul Anwar | solo |
| 1977 | Amar Prem | "Ami Karo Jonno Potho Cheye Robo" | Satya Saha | Gazi Mazharul Anwar | Khandaker Faruk Ahmed |
| 1977 | Pinjor | "Ki Kore Tomake Bhulbo" | Khandaker Nurul Alam | Shahjahan Chowdhury | solo |
| 1978 | Modhumita | "Ogo Mor Modhumita" (female) | Satya Saha | Gazi Mazharul Anwar, M. N. Akhtar | solo |
| 1979 | Iman | "Tor Banda Aaj Haat Tulechhe" | Ali Hossain | Gazi Mazharul Anwar, Mohammad Moniruzzaman, M A Hedayet | solo |

== Non-film songs ==
| Year | Film | Song | Composer(s) | Songwriter(s) | Co-artist(s) |
|---|---|---|---|---|---|
| N/A | Single | "Ami Sagorero Neel" | Abdul Ahad | Abu Hena Mustafa Kamal | solo |
