= Anisur Rahman (economist) =

Bangladeshi economist (1933–2025)

Anisur
- মোঃ আনিসুর রহমান
- Born: 1933
- Died: 5 January 2025 (aged 91); Dhaka, Bangladesh
- Occupations: Researcher, economist, professor

Academic background
- Education: University of Dhaka; Harvard University

Academic work
- Discipline: Welfare economics; Development economics

Anisur Rahman (1933 – 5 January 2025) was a Bangladeshi economist and intellectual, known for his significant contributions to the Bangladeshi independence movement. Along with Dr. Sadeque, Nurul Islam, Habibur Rahman, and Akhlaqur Rahman, Rahman was involved in developing the two-economy theory, which helped in providing a scientific understanding of the economic disparities between West Pakistan (Pakistan since 1971) and East Pakistan (Bangladesh since 1971). This understanding played a crucial role in fomenting nationalist aspirations of the people of Bangladesh and the development of the 6-Point Programme presented by Sheikh Mujibur Rahman to the West Pakistan government during the struggle for independence.

In 1971, Rahman and his family narrowly escaped being killed by the Pakistani army during the 1971 Dhaka University massacre. He fled to India with the help of friends and sought refuge with Amartya Sen before lobbying for the Bangladesh cause in America, which played a key role in halting World Bank aid to Pakistan during the Bangladesh Liberation War.

Rahman served as a member of the Bangladesh Planning Commission, where he proposed and advocated for austerity measures to help the country recover from the War of Liberation, but his frustrations grew as the political leadership failed to respond to his suggestions. He concluded that socialism was not possible with such leadership and left the commission.

He then went to serve as the Chairman of the Economics Department at the University of Dhaka and Senior Research Officer for United Nations Conference on Trade and Development (UNCTAD) in Geneva. He joined the International Labour Office (ILO) where he directed a program on the participation of the rural poor in development until his retirement in 1990. He became a strong advocate for people's self-development and participatory action research, while pursuing his passion for music and being awarded the Rabindra Puraskar in 2004 for his contribution to Rabindranath Tagore's music and literature. Rahman died in Dhaka on 5 January 2025, at the age of 91.

== Early life and education ==
Anisur Rahman was born in 1933 to Anwara Begum. Her father was Md. Hafizur Rahman, who held several ministry posts in East Pakistan. He attended St. Gregory's High School where he was classmates with Amartya Sen. He went on to study economics at the University of Dhaka, earning his BA Honours in 1955 and MA in 1956. Rahman began his career in academia, teaching at the University of Dhaka from 1957 to 1959. He left to further his education at Harvard University in the United States, where he received his PhD in economics in 1962.

== Pre-independence contributions ==
Rahman went back to teaching at the University of Dhaka from 1962 to 1965. During this period, he was part of the Economics Department and known for his anti-establishment views. The lines in the campus was sharply drawn by those who were pro-establishment and anti-establishment. During this time, the Ayub regime and its supporters appeared invincible, with most opposition leaders, including Sheikh Mujib, imprisoned. This made it difficult for serious scholarship and independent thinking to thrive at Dhaka University. Due to the pro-establishment Vice Chancellor's hostility towards Rahman, he was forced to resign when he was denied leave. Subsequently, he went to the East–West Center in Honolulu, Hawaii.

Once Hawaii was over, Rahman became the Director of the Institute of Social Sciences, Professor of Economics and Chairman of Economics Department at the University of Islamabad, Pakistan from 1967 to 1970. During this time, Air Marshal Nur Khan, the deputy chief martial law administrator in the post-Ayub Khan era, sought out Anisur Rahman for guidance on educational reform in Pakistan.

=== Fourth Five-Year Plan ===
Rahman, along with Nurul Islam, Akhlaqur Rahman, Rehman Sobhan and Dr Mazharul Huq were some East-Pakistani members of the panel for the Fourth Five-Year Plan. During discussions on the Draft Fourth Plan, the East Pakistani members of the Panel of Economists, including Anis and Rehman Sobhan, argued strongly for a significant shift in resource allocation towards East Pakistan. They proposed slowing West Pakistan's growth rate to 5.4% from the 6.8% achieved in the 1960s and reducing West Pakistan's share of net foreign inflows to 8.7% from 91.3% it had been receiving during the Third Five Year Plan period, effectively reversing the fortunes of the two regions. Despite the seeming impossibility of such a dramatic change, the East Pakistani economists believed it was necessary to prevent a national disaster. The West Pakistani economists, however, feared that such a drastic shift would harm their economy. The Panel was unable to reach a consensus and submitted two separate reports. The East Pakistanis made a passionate plea for greater equity, while the West Pakistanis were defensive and relied more on hopeful promises in the future. When the West Pakistani economists tried to assure that they were willing to concede a much larger share of net foreign aid to East Pakistan, Anisur Rehman reportedly expressed not only disbelief, but also to have reparteed that "West Pakistanis would rather hand over real political power to the Chinese than give it to the Bengalis".

== Operation Searchlight and Liberation War of Bangladesh ==
On the night of 25 March, Rahman and his family were almost killed by the Pakistani army, who murdered his colleagues. By placing a lock on the outside of his door, Rahman gave the impression that he was not present, which saved his life. To avoid being seen by the army, he and his family crawled on their hands and knees for around 48 hours. During this time, they heard the sounds of their colleagues, Professor Jyotirmoy Guhathakurta and Muniruzzaman, being dragged out of their flats and shot.

Rahman recalls in his book My Story of 1971: Through the holocaust that created Bangladesh (Dhaka: Liberation War Museum Press, 2001), 31:

We were in Flat 34C in a faculty apartment house opposite Jagannath Hall. At around 10 pm we heard some noise outside, peeped through a window of our bedroom and saw students putting up barricades on the crossing. Shortly before midnight Dora and I woke to noise outside and saw truck and jeep loads of military armed with rifles and light machine guns. They got off right in front of our house, lined up against boundary wall and took position facing Jagannath Hall... after a few minutes there was a mortar sound from a distance, and the sky roared with guns all around. The military had started firing fiercely at the dormitory and our building shook repeatedly with the sound.

After this, he and Sobhan fled to India with the help of Muyeedul Hasan and Mukhlesur Rahman. They managed to reach Agartala, but not before facing aggression from fellow Bengalis who suspected him of being a Pakistani spy. A group of students intervened, saving him from potential lynching. Rahman then continued his journey to Kolkata and Delhi. They sought refuge with Amartya Sen, who was then a professor at the Delhi School of Economics. On 2 April 1971, Sen phoned the office of Ashok Mitra, then chief economic adviser in the Ministry of Finance asking him to meet two close friends at Mitra's residence where they took shelter. Mitra then took them to P. N. Haksar's residence. Haksar was the principal secretary to Indira Gandhi and reportedly the second most powerful figure in India. Sobhan later wrote that Haksar's response suggested that he was unfamiliar with the Pakistani army's crackdown. On 3 April 1971, after receiving a full briefing from Sobhan and Rahman, Haksar met with Tajuddin Ahmad, the top leader of the Awami League, and Amirul Islam when they visited Indira Gandhi. Two weeks later, on 17 April 1971, Sobhan writes that 'Tajuddin Ahmad was sworn in as the Prime Minister of an independent Bangladesh'

In May 1971, Rahman arrived in America with the goal of lobbying for the Bangladesh cause. During his brief tenure at Harvard and Williams College, he worked tirelessly to utilize his academic connections and advocate for Bangladesh by lobbying US politicians. Rahman's efforts proved pivotal in halting the World Bank's aid to Pakistan.

== Post-independence activities ==
After Independence, Rahman returned to teach at Dhaka University until he was personally asked by Sheikh Mujibur Rahman to be part of the Planning Commission for the Government of Bangladesh.

=== Bangladesh Planning Commission (PC) ===
Rahman served as a Member of the Planning Commission for the Government of Bangladesh from 1972 to 1973. Rahman proposed austerity measures for the leadership to set an example of shared sacrifice and help a poor country recover from the trauma of the War of Liberation. He suggested the prime minister, colleagues, and PC members ride bicycles to work, explored an incomes policy with representatives of the working class, and sold or exported most government cars. Rahman wrote "visionary papers" to test the political leadership's commitment to socialism and urged the Prime Minister to stop all displays of ostentatious consumption and launch an austerity programme that involved freedom fighters and dedicated youths from among the student community. The Prime Minister fully agreed to his proposals on austerity, and then said to him, "But how do I do it?"

Rahman's frustrations grew, and he addressed Sheikh Mujibur Rahman directly, telling him what qualities of leadership he lacked. He was perhaps among a very few people in Bangladesh in 1972 to address Sheikh Mujibur Rahman, as "Sheikh Shaheb." When the political leadership failed to respond to his suggestions, Rahman concluded that socialism was not possible with such leadership and was the first to leave the Planning Commission. Before leaving out of frustration, he left behind policy papers for the Prime Minister titled 'lost moment'.

=== Later career ===
In 1974, Rahman went back to Dhaka University to serve as the Chairman of the Economics Department at the university. That same year, the Bangladesh famine occurred. It is considered to be one of the worst in the 20th century. 70 Bengali economists, writers and lawyers, headed by Rahman issued a statement saying that the recent famine was man-made and "the direct result of political and economic laissez-faire by a class of people who were given to shameless plunder, exploitation, terrorization, flattery, fraudulence and misrule." The statement said the Government "is clearly dominated by and is representative of" smugglers and profiteers.

He left his post at Dhaka University and became a Senior Research Officer for the United Nations Conference on Trade and Development (UNCTAD) in Geneva from 1975 to 1976.

In 1977, Rahman joined the International Labour Office (ILO) in Geneva where he created and directed a global program on "Participation of the Rural Poor in Development". He held this position until his retirement in 1990.

In his post-ILO career, Professor Rahman worked to advocate for "people's self-development". He became a strong proponent of Participatory Action Research (PAR) and was instrumental in introducing and promoting it in Bangladesh through "Research Initiatives-Bangladesh" (RIB), a research-funding agency, as one of the honorary founding Members of its board of directors.

Aside from his work in economics and development, Rahman had a passion for music. He is known for his distinctive style of singing Tagore's songs and has written about Tagore singing. He has given workshops and lectures on developing one's singing voice following modern vocal science in Bangladesh, Kolkata, and Santiniketan. In recognition of his contribution to Tagore's music and literature, he was awarded the biennial "Rabindra Purashkar" (Rabindra prize) by the Rabindra Parishad of Patna, Bihar, India, in May 2004.

== Bibliography ==
=== Books ===
- The lost moment: Dreams with a nation born through fire : papers on political economy of Bangladesh (1993)
- My Story of 1971: Through the Holocaust that Created Bangladesh (2001)
- Through Moments in History: Memories of Two Decades of Intellectual and Social Life (1970-1990). (2007)
- Social and Environmental Thinking of Rabindranath Tagore in the Light of Post-Tagorian World Development (2011)

=== Journals and papers ===
- Md. Anisur Rahman. "REGIONAL ALLOCATION OF INVESTMENT: An Aggregative Study in the Theory of Development Programming." The Quarterly Journal of Economics, vol. 77, no. 1, 1963, pp. 26–39. JSTOR, https://doi.org/10.2307/1879370. Accessed 29 March 2023.
- Rahman, Md. Anisur. "The Case for Industrialization of an Agricultural Country." Zeitschrift Für Nationalökonomie / Journal of Economics, vol. 26, no. 4, 1966, pp. 480–89. JSTOR, http://www.jstor.org/stable/41796982. Accessed 29 March 2023.
- Md. Anisur Rahman. "Regional Allocation of Investment: The Continuous Version." The Quarterly Journal of Economics, vol. 80, no. 1, 1966, pp. 159–60. JSTOR, https://doi.org/10.2307/1880587. Accessed 29 March 2023.
- Md. Anisur Rahman. "Foreign Capital and Domestic Savings: A Test of Haavelmo’s Hypothesis with Cross-Country Data." The Review of Economics and Statistics, vol. 50, no. 1, 1968, pp. 137–38. JSTOR, https://doi.org/10.2307/1927068. Accessed 29 March 2023.
- Rahman, Md. Anisur. "Comments on Professor Huda’s Conference Address: ‘Planning Experience in Pakistan.’" The Pakistan Development Review, vol. 8, no. 3, 1968, pp. 347–53. JSTOR, http://www.jstor.org/stable/41981654. Accessed 29 March 2023.
- Rahman, Md. Anisur. "Choice of Technique and the Volume of Saving: A RE-EXAMINATION OF THE COBB-DOUGLAS MODEL." The Pakistan Development Review, vol. 8, no. 4, 1968, pp. 606–17. JSTOR, http://www.jstor.org/stable/41981673. Accessed 29 March 2023.
- Rahman, Md. Anisur, and James A. Mirrlees. "NATIONAL INCOME AND SOCIAL VALUES: A COMMENT [Rejoinder]." The Pakistan Development Review, vol. 11, no. 1, 1971, pp. 45–53. JSTOR, http://www.jstor.org/stable/41981893. Accessed 29 March 2023.
- Rahman, Md. Anisur. "Farm Size, Efficiency and the Socioeconomics of Land Distribution." The Bangladesh Development Studies, vol. 3, no. 3, 1975, pp. 301–18. JSTOR, http://www.jstor.org/stable/40794101. Accessed 29 March 2023.
- Md Anisur Rahman. "Science for Social Revolution: The Kerala Experiment." Economic and Political Weekly, vol. 14, no. 2, 1979, pp. 59–62. JSTOR, http://www.jstor.org/stable/4367243. Accessed 29 March 2023.
- Rahman, Md. Anisur. "Transition to Collective Agriculture and Peasant Participation — North Viet Nam, Tanzania and Ethiopia." The Bangladesh Development Studies, vol. 7, no. 3, 1979, pp. 1–22. JSTOR, http://www.jstor.org/stable/40794273. Accessed 29 March 2023.
- Rahman, Anisur (October 1990). "The Case of the Third World: People's Self-Development". Community Development Journal. 25 (4). Oxford University Press: 307–314. doi:10.1093/cdj/25.4.307. JSTOR 44256896.
- Rahman, Anisur (25 July 2007). "Indian Literature(s) In English Translation". Journal of Postcolonial Writing. 43 (2): 161–171. doi:10.1080/17449850701430499.
- Rahman, Anisur (20 February 2009). "Development as freedom?". The Daily Star.
- Kamal, S. M. Mostafa, et al. "Sociopsychological Correlates of Smoking Among Male University Students in Bangladesh." Asia Pacific Journal of Public Health, vol. 23, no. 4, 2011, pp. 555–67. JSTOR, http://www.jstor.org/stable/26723739. Accessed 29 March 2023.
- Rahman, Anisur (September 1966), Finite-Horizon Planning and Optimizing the Rate of Savings, New Haven: Economic Growth Center at EliScholar.
- Rahman, Anisur (December 1966), The Welfare Economics of External Borrowing, New Haven: Economic Growth Center at EliScholar.
- Rahman, Anisur (May 1967), Perspective Planning for Economic Maturity: Concepts, Logic and Methodology, New Haven: Economic Growth Center at EliScholar.
- Rahman, Anisur (June 1967), On the (Social) Elasticity of Marginal Utility from One- Period Consumption), New Haven: Economic Growth Center at EliScholar.
- Rahman, Anisur (March 2008), Missing the Opportunity to Free the Royal Bengal Tiger, The Daily Star.

== See also ==
- List of Bangladeshi Economists
