= Abdul Monem (entrepreneur) =

Bangladeshi industrialist and entrepreneur (1937–2020)

- Born: 5 January 1937; Brahmanbaria, Bengal Province, British India
- Died: 31 May 2020 (aged 83); Dhaka, Bangladesh
- Children: 5 including Mainuddin, Mohiuddin and Farhana

Abdul Monem (5 January 1937 – 31 May 2020) was a Bangladeshi industrialist and entrepreneur. He was given the title of Commercially Important Person by the Government of Bangladesh for his contribution to business. He was the founding chairperson and managing director of Abdul Monem Limited. The group owns Igloo ice cream and is the official bottler of Coca-Cola in Bangladesh.

== Early life ==
Abdul Monem was born on 5 January 1937 in Brahmanbaria District. He studied civil engineering. He had two sons and three daughters. His sons, ASM Mainuddin Monem, and ASM Mohiuddin Monem, are the Deputy Managing Directors of Abdul Monem Limited. His daughter, Farhana Monem, the chairperson of GME Group got Best Women Tax Payer Award by Bangladesh government for five consecutive years.

== Career ==
In 1956, Monem founded Abdul Monem Limited. He started the company with a capital of 20 thousand taka. Abdul Monem served as the Director of NCC Bank, National Life Insurance Company Limited, and Pragati Insurance Limited. He bought out K Rahman and Company in 1982. He then started working as an official bottler of Coca-Cola Bangladesh. From 1984 to 1995, he served as the chairperson of the Mohammedan Sporting Club.

== Awards and honors ==
In 2014, Monem was awarded the Presidential Medal for his contribution to the industrial development of Bangladesh. In 2015, Abdul Monem founded 216 acre Abdul Monem Economic Zone, one of the first private economic zones in Bangladesh, in Manikganj District.

Monem was awarded the Lifetime achievement award in the Twelve Presents Rise Above All of 2019.

== Death ==
Monem was admitted to Square Hospital on 17 May 2020. He died on 31 May at the Combined Military Hospital, Dhaka, where he was transferred to, from a stroke. He was buried in his family graveyard in Brahmanbaria District.
