= Mustafa Kamal (judge) =

9th Chief Justice of Bangladesh

- মোস্তফা কামাল

9th Chief Justice of Bangladesh
- In office 1 June 1999 – 31 December 1999
- Appointed by: Shahabuddin Ahmed
- President: Shahabuddin Ahmed
- Prime Minister: Sheikh Hasina
- Preceded by: A. T. M. Afzal
- Succeeded by: Latifur Rahman

Justice of the Appellate Division of Bangladesh
- In office 1 December 1989 – May 1999

Justice of the High Court Division of Bangladesh
- In office April 1979 – November 1989

Personal details
- Born: 9 May 1933 Domar, Rangpur District, Bengal Presidency, British India
- Died: 5 January 2015 (aged 81–82) Dhaka, Bangladesh
- Resting place: Azimpur Graveyard
- Spouse: Husne Ara Kamal
- Children: 3, including Nashid
- Parent: Abbasuddin Ahmed (father)
- Relatives: Mustafa Zaman Abbasi (brother); Ferdausi Rahman (sister); Maziruddin Ahmed (granduncle)
- Education: University of Dhaka; London School of Economics
- Occupation: Jurist

Mustafa Kamal (Bengali: মোস্তফা কামাল; 9 May 1933 – 5 January 2015) was the 9th Chief Justice of Bangladesh. His landmark judgment was on the Masdar Hossain case, widely known as the 'separation of judiciary', which was a milestone in the quest for separation of powers between the judiciary and the executive of the state. Kamal was a pioneer of alternative dispute resolution (ADR) in Bangladesh, and is considered by many as the 'father of ADR' in Bangladesh.

== Background ==
Kamal was born on 9 May 1933 in the village of Domar in Rangpur District of the Bengal Presidency in British India (now in Bangladesh). He was named by the national poet of Bangladesh Kazi Nazrul Islam after the Turkish President Mustafa Kemal Atatürk. Kamal's father, Abbasuddin Ahmed, was a legendary Bengali Renaissance singer and composer. Mustafa Kamal's younger brother, Mustafa Zaman Abbasi, is a musicologist and writer, and his younger sister, Ferdausi Rahman, is a legendary playback singer and vocalist.

== Early life and education ==
Kamal spent his early childhood in the village of Balarampur of Cooch Behar - a princely state during the British Raj and now a district of West Bengal, India. Later, he was moved to the district town of Cooch Behar and attended schools from there. He shifted with his family to Dhaka, the capital of erstwhile East Pakistan in 1947.

Justice Mustafa Kamal's formal education started in Cooch Behar's Jenkins School, when he was enrolled in class three in 1940. Established in 1861, Jenkins School was one of the most reputed schools in the Bengal Presidency. He continued studying in that school until 1946, when he was transferred to Kolkata and was admitted in class nine in Ballygunge Government High School. Kamal had to return to his previous Cooch Behar school later in the same year for there was a communal riot in Kolkata in the month of August. He completed class nine from Jenkins School, and in January 1947, got re-admitted to Ballygunge Govt. High School in class ten. This time again, he could not finish the class in Ballygunge due to the partition of India. In August 1947, Abbasuddin Ahmed, Mustafa Kamal's father, opted to migrate to Dhaka – the capital of East Pakistan. Before the partition was finalized, Kamal, for a brief period of time, took classes in Jenkins School. Finally in the later part of 1947, he moved to Dhaka along with his family, and got admitted in the Dhaka Collegiate School to finish class ten.

In 1948, Kamal appeared in the examination of Matric from the Dhaka Collegiate School. He stood 7th in the merit list of Dhaka Board (covering all of East Pakistan). He studied Intermediate in the Jagannath College of Dhaka (now a public university of Bangladesh), and appeared in the I.A. examination in 1950. This time, he stood 5th in the merit list. In 1950, Kamal got himself admitted in the University of Dhaka, Bangladesh. Kamal studied Political Science in his B.A. (Hons) and M.A. In the year 1953 and 1954 respectively, he achieved those degrees securing `first class first’ in both. He also stood first among all candidates in the Arts faculty and was awarded a special scholarship from the Pakistan Government.

In September 1955, he went to England with this scholarship. He obtained an M.Sc. (Economics) in 1958 from the London School of Economics and Political Science (LSE), London, UK. While he was studying for his M.Sc., Mr. Kamal joined the famed Lincoln's Inn (London, UK) and was called to the Bar in 1959.

== Career ==
Having completed the Bar-at-Law course, Barrister Mustafa Kamal was called to the Bar from the Hon’ble Society of Lincoln's Inn (London, UK) in 1959. He returned to Dhaka, and began his professional career as a lawyer in the same year. In 1961, he also joined the Department of Law in the University of Dhaka as a part-time Lecturer, and continued until 1968. He also served as the legal advisor to Rajuk at that period of time. The Government of Bangladesh appointed him as an Additional Attorney General in 1976. In 1977, he was appointed as the Advocate General of the High Court, when the High Court got separated from the Supreme Court. After eleven months, the Supreme Court and the High Court got reinstated, and the position of Advocate General was dissolved. Barrister Kamal returned to the practice of law. He was, however, called to the bench on 9 April 1979 as a Justice of the High Court Division of the Supreme Court of Bangladesh, and was elevated to the Appellate Division of the Supreme Court of Bangladesh on 1 December 1989. Justice Mustafa Kamal became the Chief Justice of Bangladesh on 1 June 1999, and took his retirement on 1 January 2000. His final judgment was on the famed Masdar Hossain case, popularly known as 'the separation of judiciary', which is considered as one of the five most important cases in the constitutional history of Bangladesh.

In the year 2000, Justice Kamal joined the World Bank as a Consultant from Bangladesh. He helped introduce Alternative Dispute Resolution (ADR) in Bangladesh serving as the overall coordinator of the Legal and Judicial Capacity Building Project (L&JCBP) of the World Bank. He is titled the 'Father of ADR in Bangladesh'.

Kamal was also appointed the chairman of the Law Commission of Bangladesh on 6 December 2005, and carried out his responsibilities until 5 December 2007.

== Landmark judgments ==
=== Separation of judiciary ===
Kamal's landmark judgment was on Masdar Hossain case (Secretary, Ministry of Finance v Masdar Hossain, 1999), widely known as the ‘separation of judiciary'. In this case, Justice Kamal laid out a clear road-map for the separation of the lower judiciary from the Executive. The decision was determined on the question of to what degrees the constitution of Bangladesh has in effect secured the separation of judiciary from the executive organs of the State, and whether the provisions of the constitution that may grantee the independence of judiciary have been followed in practice. The judgment with 12 directive points was pronounced on 7 May 1997 (reported in 18 BLD 558). The Government appealed, and the Appellate Division upheld the decision of the High Court Division with some modifications. The judgment was delivered on 2 December 1999 (reported in 52DLR 82). The Government was given clear directions in order to complete the process of separation of the lower judiciary from the executive by undertaking steps, such as

- A separate Judicial Service Pay Commission,
- Amendment of the criminal procedure
- New rules for the selection and discipline of members of the lower judiciary.

However, the implementation was being delayed; seemingly, there was a lack of political goodwill. Justice Mustafa Kamal, after his retirement, continued to advocate the cause, and spoke boldly on the reluctance of the Executive to implement the directives of the Supreme Court of Bangladesh. After a long period of political procrastination, the implementation started in 2007.

Kamal felt the need of independence and autonomy of the judiciary even before 1995, when a group of judicial officers brought before the court the constitutional issue that led to the outcome of the Masdar Hossain case. In 1994, Kamal was invited by the University of Dhaka to deliver the prestigious Kamini Kumar Dutta Memorial Law Lecture; he chose the topic ‘Bangladesh Constitution: Trends & Issues’. This lecture provided with invaluable insights that helped build a consensus on necessary reforms. Barrister Manzoor Hasan, who was the founding executive director of Transparency International Bangladesh (TIB), observed in 1997: "As TIB was advocating for improved governance, Justice Mustafa Kamal was exercising his judicial mind to call for an independent lower judiciary or redefining the limits of 'locus standi' in relation to writ applications."

Kamal's resolute stand in favour of the independence of the judiciary was evident in his first speech as the newly appointed Chief Justice of Bangladesh addressed to the members of the Supreme Court Bar Association on 1 June 1999. Kamal stated:

Our lawyers and Judges have long felt that the lofty fundamental principle of State policy embodied in Article 22 of the constitution providing that the State shall ensure the separation of the judiciary from the executive organs of the state should be implemented without delay. The independence of the judiciary which is embodied in Articles 94(4) and 116A will not be meaningful at all, however, unless the judiciary enjoys both financial and administrative independence and autonomy.

=== Redefining 'locus standi' ===
In the judgement of Dr. Mohiuddin Farooque Vs Bangladesh (Civil Appeal No. 24 of 1995), the Appellate Division of the Supreme Court of Bangladesh took a firm stand on the modern liberal trend of Public Interest Litigation leaving aside the traditional view of locus standi. The Supreme Court decided to interpret the term ‘a person aggrieved’ in a liberal mood and with a progressive attitude, and thus widened the writ Jurisdiction of the High Court conferred on it by Article 102 of the Constitution of the People's Republic of Bangladesh. The leading judgment was delivered by Justice Mustafa Kamal on 25 July 1996. In his explanation of the scope of 'locus standi', Kamal stated in his judgment:

In Bangladesh an unnoticed but quiet revolution took place on the question of locus standi after the introduction of the Constitution of the People's Republic of Bangladesh in 1972...From the language used in Article 102(1) of our Constitution, 'any person aggrieved' may move the High Court Division for enforcement of fundamental right conferred by part ɪɪɪ of the Constitution. Under Article 102(2)(a), the High Court Division may make an order on the application of any 'person aggrieved' in the nature of mandamus, prohibition and certiorari except for and application for habeas corpus or quo-warranto.

The implication of the judgment was that voluntary societies, representative organisations, trade unions and constitutional activists and individuals having no personal interest would now be able to test the validity of a law or an action of a public official affecting the general public by making the power of judicial review of the Supreme Court on their own standing.

=== Iddat ===
'Iddat' is a 'Quranic provision' which maintains that 'the husband', after divorce, is required to support 'the wife' for a specific period of time. A Writ Petition was filed by a Non Government Organization (NGO) seeking cancellation or amendment of the provision. The High Court gave its judgment against the Quranic provision of Iddat. The case was forwarded to the Appellate Division of the Supreme Court by way of appeal. Justice Mustafa Kamal played an active role to overturn the judgment. The Appellate Division called two religious scholars to provide with their expert-opinions. The bench of the Appellate Division agreed unanimously to overturn the High Court judgment. In his judgment, Kamal expressed his complete disapproval of High Court judges' ignorance of basic Islamic knowledge, norms and philosophy.

== 'Father of ADR' in Bangladesh ==
Having long been concerned about the growing backlog of cases, which were delaying court decisions and denying justice to many, Justice Mustafa Kamal was interested in alternatives to formal litigation. Soon after his retirement as the Chief Justice of Bangladesh, Kamal headed a five-person legal study group - formally called The Bangladesh Legal Study Group (BLSG) - with the purpose of introducing Alternative Dispute Resolution (ADR), more particularly mediation, into the legal and judicial system of Bangladesh. For the next few years, he led from the front to introduce ADR in Bangladesh. Justice Mustafa Kamal was committed from the start to introduce the benefits of mediation and other forms of ADR in reducing backlog of cases and making justice more accessible to the citizens of Bangladesh. He trained, for four years, mostly voluntarily, about fifteen hundred lawyers, judges and court officials in the principles and practice of different forms of ADR. The Government of Bangladesh introduced ADR in many areas including environmental and family laws in 2010. Many consider Justice Mustafa Kamal as ‘the father of ADR' in Bangladesh.

== Personal life ==
Kamal was married to professor Husne Ara Kamal. She retired as the director of the Institute of Social Welfare and Research, Dhaka University (ISWR) (1934-2009). They had three daughters Nashid Kamal, Naeela K Sattar and Nazeefa K Monem. Nashid Kamal is a vocalist, writer, and professor of demography. Naeela K Sattar is a special education teacher in Amherst, US and also a lawyer (from Cornell, Ithaca, US). Nazeefa K Monem is a first class holder in Biochemistry from Dhaka University (1994). His granddaughter, Armeen Musa, is a grammy nominated singer-songwriter and composer.

Kamal died on 5 January 2015 of heart disease in Gulshan, Dhaka at the age of 81.

== Notes ==
1. according to the press release by his daughter Nashid Kamal
