= Mustafa Zaman Abbasi =

Bangladeshi musicologist (1936–2025)

- Born: Mustafa Zaman; 8 December 1936; Balarampur, Cooch Behar, Cooch Behar State, India
- Died: 10 May 2025 (aged 88); Dhaka, Bangladesh
- Occupations: Musician, writer
- Spouse: Asma Abbasi
- Children: 2
- Parent: Abbas Uddin Ahmed
- Relatives: Mustafa Kamal (brother); Ferdausi Rahman (sister); Maziruddin Ahmed (granduncle)

Mustafa Zaman Abbasi (Bengali: মুস্তাফা জামান আব্বাসী; 8 December 1936 – 10 May 2025) was a Bangladeshi musicologist. He was awarded Ekushey Padak in 1995 by the Government of Bangladesh. Abbasi was the youngest son of folk singer-composer Abbas Uddin Ahmed. He was a research scholar at the "Kazi Nazrul Islam and Abbasuddin Research and Study Centre" of Independent University, Bangladesh.

== Early life and background ==
Abbasi was born on 8 December 1936 in the Cooch Behar district of the then British India (now in West Bengal, India). Abbasi was the third son of Abbasuddin Ahmed. His eldest brother Mustafa Kamal was the Chief Justice of Bangladesh. His sister Ferdausi Rahman is a playback singer. Abbasi was trained by Indian classical musicians including Ustad Muhammad Hussain Khasru and Ustad Gul Mohammad Khan.

== Works ==
Abbasi published more than fifty books in total. He published two books on Bhawaiya music with staff notation of about 1,200 songs. He published several books on poems of Jalaluddin Rumi, Niffari and Sultan Bahu. His books include "Abbasuddin Ahmed, Manush o Shilpi", "Kazi Nazrul Islam, Man and Poet" and "Puribo Ekaki".

He anchored television programmes including "Amar Thikana" and "Bhora Nadeer Banke".

== Personal life and death ==
Abbasi was married to Asma Abbasi. Their daughters are Samira Abbasi and Sharmini Abbasi.

On 10 May 2025, Abbasi died at a hospital in Dhaka. He was 88.

== Awards ==
- Ekushey Padak (1995)
- Apex Foundation Award
- Natyasobha Award
- Bengal Centenary Award
- Abbasuddin Gold Medal
- Manik Mia Award
- Sylhet Music Award
- Lalon Parishad Award
