= Maziruddin Ahmed =

West Bengal politician

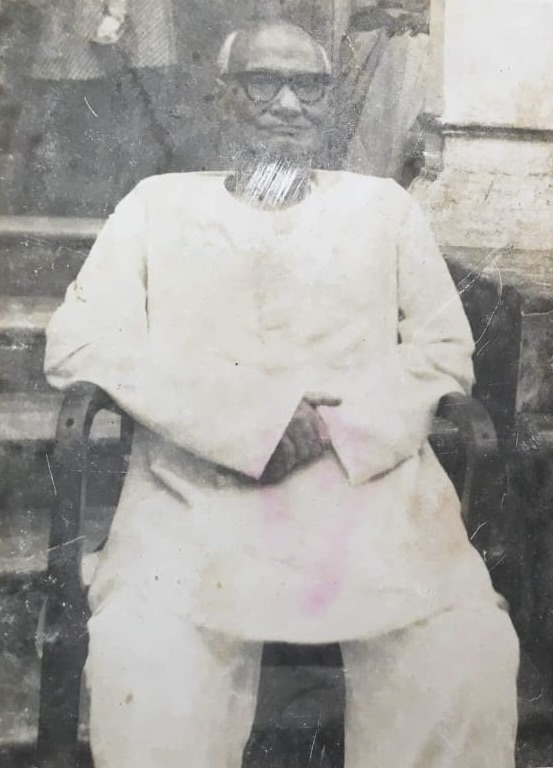

Member of West Bengal Legislative Assembly
- In office 1952–1962
- Preceded by: Constituency established
- Succeeded by: Constituency abolished
- Constituency: Cooch Behar

Personal details
- Born: December 1898 Cooch Behar State
- Party: Indian National Congress
- Relatives: Abbasuddin Ahmed (nephew); Mustafa Kamal (grandnewphew)
- Education: Victoria College; Jenkins School
- Alma mater: University Law College

Maziruddin Ahmed (born December 1898) is an Indian politician belonging to the Indian National Congress. He was the MLA of Cooch Behar Assembly constituency in the West Bengal Legislative Assembly.

== Early life and education ==
Ahmed was born in December 1898 to a Bengali family of Muslim Nashya Shaikhs in the village of Balarampur, then part of the princely state of Cooch Behar (now Cooch Behar district, West Bengal). He was the son of Kalimuddin Ahmed. They were seven brothers and one sister (Khuki). Notable among the brothers are Dr. Fazlur Rahman, Ali Zafar Ahmed (lawyer), Wasequddin and Abdul Jabbar Ahmed.

His elder brother Ali Zafar Ahmed's son is the renowned Bengali folk singer, music director, and composer Abbasuddin Ahmed (Pride of Performance (1960), Shilpakala Academy Award (posthumously in 1979) and Swadhinata Puraskar (1981)) and grandson is the 9th Chief Justice of Bangladesh, Mustafa Kamal.

Ahmed studied at the Jenkins School and then at the Victoria College, both located within Cooch Behar. He then proceeded to study at the University Law College in Calcutta, where he graduated with a Bachelor of Laws degree.

== Personal life ==
Ahmed married Azizatunnesa, daughter of legal practitioner Abdul Aziz Pradhan.

== Career ==
Ahmed served various roles within the Cooch Behar State. He was the vice chairman of the Cooch Behar municipality, and later became its commissioner. He also served as a member of the Cooch Behar District Minority Board, North Bengal Flood Control Advisory Committee and Regional Transport Authority. Aside from that, Ahmed was a member of the governing body of Victoria College, president of the Gunjabari Women's Society.

Ahmed was a member of the Cooch Behar Legislative Council. He successfully contested in the 1952 West Bengal Legislative Assembly election where he ran as an Indian National Congress candidate for the Cooch Behar Assembly constituency. Ahmed supported a resolution for the separation of Cooch Behar (including Jalpaiguri and Darjeeling districts) from West Bengal, citing cultural differences and support from nearly one million inhabitants in the district. He also supported the mass cultivation of tobacco in Cooch Behar to improve the local standard of living. Ahmed was re-elected from the same constituency at the 1957 West Bengal Legislative Assembly election. The constituency was split into North and South for the 1962 West Bengal Legislative Assembly election. Ahmed ran for the Cooch Behar North constituency, and lost to Forward Bloc candidate Sunil Dasgupta.
