= Abbasuddin Ahmed =

Bengali singer

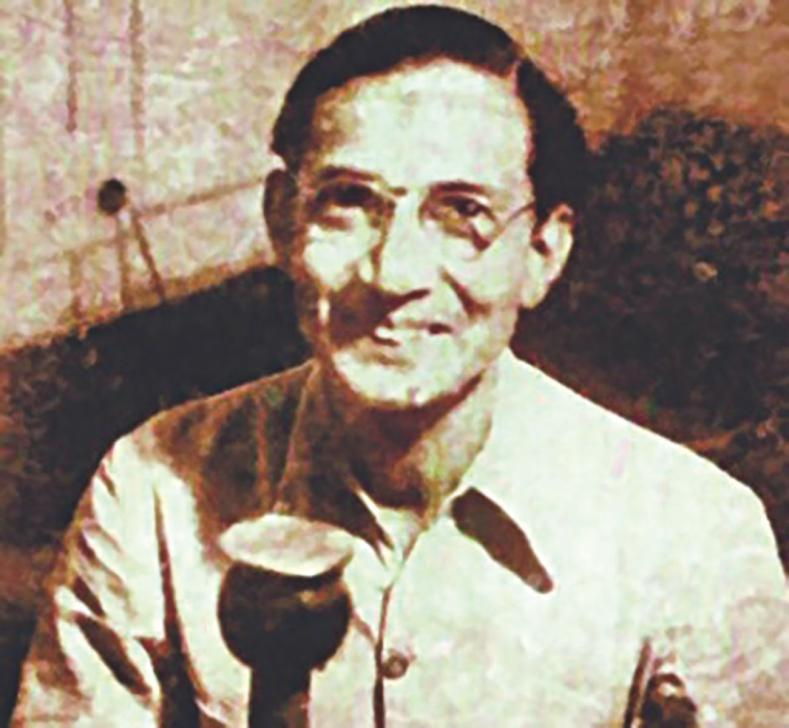

Background information
- Born: 27 October 1901; Tufanganj, Cooch Behar State, British India
- Died: 30 December 1959 (aged 58) Dacca, East Pakistan, Pakistan
- Genres: Bhawaiya, Nazrul Geeti
- Occupations: Singer, composer
- Instrument: Vocals
- Children: Mustafa; Ferdousi; Abbasi
- Relatives: Maziruddin Ahmed (uncle)
- Awards: Pride of Performance; Independence Day Award; Shilpakala Academy Award

Abbasuddin Ahmed (27 October 1901 – 30 December 1959) was a Bengali folk song composer and singer born in the Bengal province of British India. He was known for Bhawaiya folk song, which is a style commonly found in Rangpur, undivided Goalpara district, and Cooch Behar.

== Early life ==
Ahmed was born on 27 October 1901 to a Bengali family of Muslim Nashya Shaikhs in the village of Balarampur in Tufanganj subdivision, then part of the princely state of Cooch Behar (now Cooch Behar district, West Bengal). His father, Zafar Ali Ahmed, was a lawyer at Tufanganj court, while his uncle Maziruddin Ahmed was a member of the Bengal Legislative Assembly. He was educated in schools and a college in North Bengal and was attracted to music by the cultural programs they offered. He was largely a self-taught composer and singer, though for a brief period he learned music from Ustad Zamiruddin Khan in Kolkata.

== Career ==
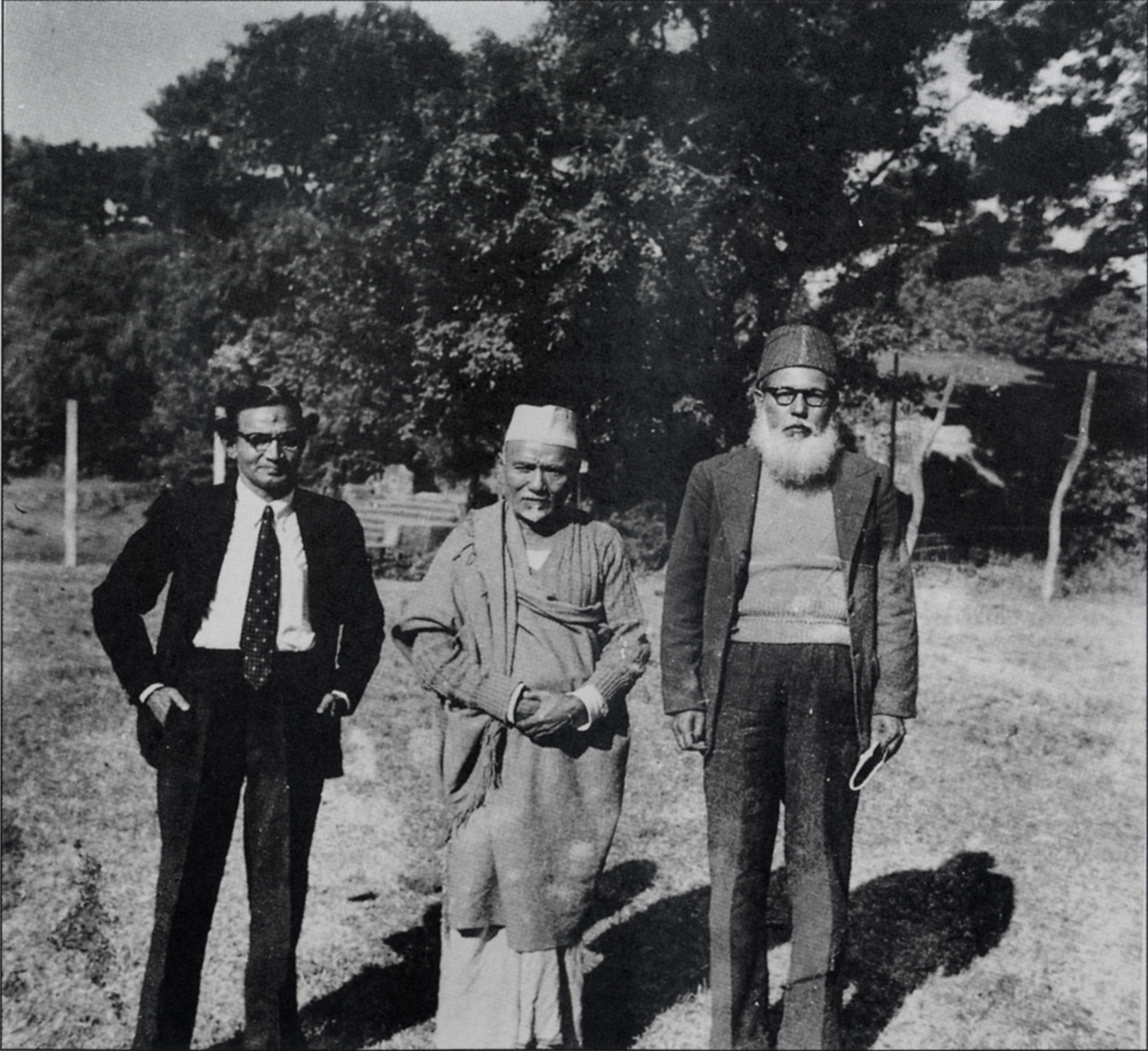
Ahmed (left) with Allauddin Khan and Qazi Motahar Hossain (c. 1955)

Ahmed started his career by singing modern Bangla songs for the His Master's Voice studios, followed by modern songs of poet Kazi Nazrul Islam, who later became the national poet of Bangladesh. He then requested Nazrul Islam to write and tune Islamic songs, which he sang in large numbers and recorded for the His Master's Voice studios. He has a pioneering role in bringing the music to the home of the Indian Muslims and arousing them from a state of backwardness. He was the first Muslim in erstwhile India who used his own name in the record labels. Before Abbassddin Ahmed, Muslim singers would use pseudonyms so that their Muslim identity would be anonymous. He later recorded Bhawaiya, Khirol, and Chatka, which were famous in undivided Goalpara district, Cooch Behar, and Rangpur. Later he started to sing other folk songs like jaari, sari, bhatiyali, murshidi, bichchhedi (songs of estrangement), marsiya, dehatattwa, and musical plays. He also collaborated with Jasimuddin and Golam Mostafa.

== Awards ==
- Pride of Performance (1960)
- Shilpakala Academy Award (1979)
- Independence Day Award (1981)

== Legacy ==
Ahmed's first son Mustafa Kamal served as the Chief Justice of Bangladesh during June–December 1999. His only daughter, Ferdausi Rahman is a classical musician. His youngest son, Mustafa Zaman Abbasi, is a folk researcher, writer, singer and social worker.

Ahmed's granddaughter, Nashid Kamal, daughter of Mustafa Kamal, is a singer, professor of demography and writer.
