= List of banks in Bangladesh =

The bank sector in Bangladesh consists of several types of institutions. Bangladesh Bank is the central bank of Bangladesh and the chief regulatory authority in the banking sector.

According to the Bangladesh Bank Order, 1972 the Government of Bangladesh reorganized the Dhaka Branch of the State Bank of Pakistan as the central bank of the country and named it Bangladesh Bank with retrospective effect from 16 December 1971. Other than Bangladesh Bank, banks in Bangladesh are primarily categorized into two types: Scheduled and Non-Scheduled banks.

== Scheduled banks ==
Scheduled banks are licensed under the Bank Company Act, 1991 (Amended to 2013). Currently, there are 62 scheduled banks in Bangladesh.

=== State-owned commercial banks (SOCBs) ===
There are 7 state-owned commercial banks (SOCBs) that are fully or majorly owned by the Government of Bangladesh.

- Agrani Bank
- Bangladesh Development Bank
- BASIC Bank
- Janata Bank
- Rupali Bank
- Sonali Bank
- Sammilito Islami Bank

=== Specialized banks (SDBs) ===
3 specialized banks are now operating which were established for specific objectives like agricultural or industrial development. These banks are also fully or majorly owned by the Government of Bangladesh.

- Bangladesh Krishi Bank
- Rajshahi Krishi Unnayan Bank
- Probashi Kallyan Bank

=== Private commercial banks (PCBs) ===
There is a total of 43 PCBs in operation right now. They are majorly owned by private entities and classified into two types.

==== Conventional PCBs ====
In total, 33 conventional PCBs are now operating in the industry. They perform the banking functions in a conventional fashion i.e. interest-based operations.

- AB Bank PLC
- Bangladesh Commerce Bank Limited
- Bank Asia PLC
- Bengal Commercial Bank PLC
- BRAC Bank PLC
- Citizens Bank PLC
- City Bank PLC
- Community Bank Bangladesh PLC
- Dhaka Bank PLC
- Dutch-Bangla Bank PLC
- Eastern Bank PLC
- IFIC Bank PLC
- Jamuna Bank PLC
- Meghna Bank PLC
- Mercantile Bank PLC
- Midland Bank PLC
- Modhumoti Bank PLC
- Mutual Trust Bank PLC
- National Bank PLC
- National Credit & Commerce Bank PLC
- NRB Bank PLC
- NRBC Bank PLC
- ONE Bank PLC
- Padma Bank PLC
- Prime Bank PLC
- Pubali Bank PLC
- SBAC Bank PLC
- Shimanto Bank PLC
- Southeast Bank PLC
- The Premier Bank PLC
- Trust Bank PLC
- United Commercial Bank PLC
- Uttara Bank PLC

==== Islami Shariah Based PCBs ====
There are 5 Islami Shariah-based PCBs in Bangladesh and they execute banking activities according to Islami Shariah-based principles i.e. Profit-Loss Sharing (PLS) mode.

- Al-Arafah Islami Bank PLC
- ICB Islamic Bank PLC
- Islami Bank Bangladesh PLC
- Shahjalal Islami Bank PLC
- Standard Bank PLC

=== Foreign commercial banks (FCBs) ===
In total, 8 FCBs are operating in Bangladesh as the branches of the banks which are incorporated in abroad.

- Citibank, N.A (United States of America)
- Commercial Bank of Ceylon PLC (Sri Lanka)
- Habib Bank Limited (Pakistan)
- HSBC (United Kingdom) (exited retail banking business)
- National Bank of Pakistan (Pakistan)
- Standard Chartered Bank (United Kingdom)
- State Bank of India (India)
- Woori Bank (South Korea)

=== Non-scheduled banks ===
Non-scheduled banks are licensed only for specific functions and objectives and do not offer the same range of services as scheduled banks. There are now 5 non-scheduled banks in Bangladesh which are:

- Ansar VDP Unnayan Bank
- Grameen Bank
- Jubilee Bank
- Karmashangosthan Bank
- Palli Sanchay Bank

== Non-bank financial institutions (NBFIs) ==
Non-bank financial institutions (NBFIs), known as financial institutions (FIs), are those types of financial institutions that are regulated under the Financial Institution Act, of 1993 and controlled by Bangladesh Bank. Now, 34 FIs operate in Bangladesh while the maiden one was established in 1981. Out of the total, two are fully government-owned, one is the subsidiary of a SOCB, 15 were initiated by private domestic initiatives and 15 were initiated by joint venture initiatives.

NBFI's include:

- Agrani SME Financing Company Limited
- Aviva Finance Limited
- Bangladesh Finance and Investment Company Limited (BD Finance)
- Bangladesh Industrial Finance Company Limited (BIFC)
- Bangladesh Infrastructure Finance Fund Limited (BIFFL)
- Bay Leasing and Investment Limited
- CVC Finance Limited
- DBH Finance PLC (DBH)
- Fareast Finance and Investment Limited
- FAS Finance and Investment Limited
- First Finance Limited
- GSP Finance Company Limited (GSPB)
- Hajj Finance Company Limited
- IDLC Finance Limited
- Industrial and Infrastructure Development Finance Company Limited (IIDFC)
- Infrastructure Development Company Limited (IDCOL)
- International Leasing and Financial Services Limited
- IPDC Finance Limited
- Islamic Finance and Investment Limited
- LankaBangla Finance Limited
- Lankan Alliance Finance Limited
- Meridian Finance and Investment Limited.
- MIDAS Financing Limited. (MFL)
- Nagad Finance PLC
- National Finance Limited
- National Housing Finance and Investments Limited
- People's Leasing and Financial Services Limited
- Phoenix Finance and Investments Limited
- Premier Leasing and Finance Limited
- Prime Finance and Investment Limited
- Saudi-Bangladesh Industrial and Agricultural Investment Company Limited (SABINCO)
- The UAE-Bangladesh Investment Company Limited
- Union Capital Limited
- United Finance Limited
- Uttara Finance and Investments Limited

== Specialized financial institutions (semi-formal sector) ==
- Bangladesh House Building Finance Corporation (BHBFC)
- Palli Karma Sahayak Foundation (PKSF)
