= Union Capital Limited =

Financial institution in Bangladesh

- Abbreviation: UCL
- Formation: 1993
- Headquarters: Dhaka, Bangladesh
- Region served: Bangladesh
- Official language: Bengali
- Website: www.unicap-bd.com

Union Capital Limited is a major Non-bank financial institutions of Bangladesh based in Dhaka. It is listed on the Dhaka Stock Exchange and the Chittagong Stock Exchange.

Union Capital Limited had 10.48 billion BDT losses in 2024. Munshi Shafiul Haque, an independent director, is the chairman of Union Capital Limited.

== History ==
Union Capital Limited was established in 1993 by purchasing the local branch of Peregrine Capital Limited (a subsidiary of Peregrine Investments Holdings). Enam Ahmed Chowdhury, former vice-president of the Islamic Development Bank, was the first chairman of Union Capital. Nasir A Choudhury, managing director of Green Delta Insurance Company Limited and Delta Brac Housing Finance Corporation Limited, was a sponsor of Union Capital Limited.

Union Capital Limited provided a 30 percent dividend in 2007. It was part of a syndicated loan of nearly 1 billion BDT to Creative Paper Mills Limited owned by Hasanul Morshed. Amir Humayun Mahmud Chowdhury, brother of Bangladesh Nationalist Party politician Amir Khasru Mahmud Chowdhury, was chairman of Union Capital Limited.

Chowdhury Tanzim Karim was appointed chairman of Union Capital Limited in July 2012. M Khairul Hossain, chairman of Bangladesh Securities and Exchange Commission, warned Union Capital Limited not providing complete information on Padma Islami Life Limited for which it was the issue manager.

Mahmudul Alam, former additional managing director of GSP Finance Company, was appointed managing director of Union Capital Limited in January 2016. It received an award from Institute of Chartered Accountants of Bangladesh for its 2016 annual report.

Union Capital Limited tried to auction a property of Computer Source in Pink City Xenovalley after it failed to repay a nearly 300 million BDT loan in 2017.

Union Capital Limited has been struggling financially since 2018 and has been having difficulties returning money to depositors including one billion BDT deposit of British American Tobacco Bangladesh. Bangladesh Bank placed a cap on loans of 10 million BDT. Palli Daridro Bimochon Foundation, Marie Stopes Bangladesh, and Confidence Infrastructure also could not access their deposits with the institution. Mostafa Group has not returned its loan from Union Capital Limited and other banks and its chairman Hefazatur Rahman was arrested.

In October 2019, Chowdhury Manzoor Liaquat was appointed managing director of Union Capital Limited. Bangladesh Bank would block Islamic Finance and Investment Limited from hiring Chowdhury Manzoor Liaquat as its managing director in 2021.

The Anti-Corruption Commission sued officials of Bangladesh Infrastructure Finance Fund Limited for depositing funds in two banks and 12 financial institutions, including Union Capital Limited, without proper authorization. The banks and institutions were underperforming and unable to return the deposits. In August 2022, GM Khurshid Alam was appointed chairman of Union Capital.

By September 2023, Union Capital Limited given 12 billion BDT loans out of which 5.45 billion was defaulted on. Its stock prices went under the face value. It did not provide financial statements for the year violating rules for listed companies. According to The Daily Star 16 billion BDT of funds of state owned Agrani Bank, Janata Bank, Rupali Bank, and Sonali Bank were stuck in Bangladesh Industrial Finance Company Limited, FAS Finance and Investment Limited, First Finance Limited, International Leasing and Financial Services Limited, People's Leasing and Financial Services Limited, Premier Leasing and Finance Limited, Prime Finance, Fareast Finance and Investment Limited, and Union Capital Limited which were suffering from losses.

In February 2024, Bangladesh Bank approved the merger of Union Capital Limited with Prime Bank. Azam J Chowdhury, former chairman of Prime Bank, took the initiative for the merger. It then asked for the merger plans from the two companies. It did not have a managing director.

== Subsidiary ==
- Unicap Securities Limited
- UNICAP Investments Limited
