= Bangladesh Institute of Bank Management =

- বাংলাদেশ ইনস্টিটিউট অব ব্যাংক ম্যানেজমেন্ট
- Seal of BIBM
- Established: 1974; 52 years ago
- Chairman: Governor of Bangladesh Bank
- Location: Section-2, Mirpur, Dhaka, Bangladesh; 23.8016°N 90.3588°E
- Website: bibm.org.bd

The Bangladesh Institute of Bank Management (BIBM) is the national training, research, consultancy and education institute on banking and finance collectively owned by all banks that are in operation in the country.

== About BIBM ==
Bangladesh Institute of Bank Management was established in 1974 to train officials of banks and financial institutions of Bangladesh. Since then, BIBM has extended its scope to include providing Masters in Bank Management (MBM) and Evening MBM (EMBM) degrees, carrying out research in banking and finance, holding seminars and round table discussions, and aiding financial institutions in their recruitment. Even with these activities, which are somewhat complementary with one another, training still occupies the centre-stage of BIBM operation. But BIBM now imparts training to only mid-level and senior officials of banks and financial institutions and generally in areas where all its members have common interest.

== Governing board ==
=== Chairman ===
- Governor, Bangladesh Bank

=== Members ===
1. Deputy governors, Bangladesh Bank
2. Managing director & CEO, Sonali Bank Limited
3. Managing director & CEO, Janata Bank Limited
4. Managing director & CEO, Agrani Bank Limited
5. Managing director & CEO, Rupali Bank Limited
6. Managing director & CEO, Pubali Bank Limited
7. Managing director, Uttara Bank Limited
8. Managing director, Bangladesh Krishi Bank
9. Managing director, Bangladesh Development Bank Limited
10. President & managing director, AB Bank Limited
11. Managing director, National Bank Limited
12. Managing director & CEO, Eastern Bank Limited
13. Managing director, United Commercial Bank Limited
14. Managing director, Islami Bank Bangladesh Limited
15. Managing director, IFIC Bank Limited
16. Managing director, Rajshahi Krishi Unnayan Bank
17. CEO, Standard Chartered Bank
18. Managing director, Dutch-Bangla Bank Limited
19. Managing director & CEO, Mercantile Bank Limited
20. Managing director, ONE Bank Limited
21. Managing director, Al-Arafah Islami Bank Limited
22. Managing director & CEO, National Credit and Commerce Bank Limited
23. Managing director & CEO, Trust Bank Limited
24. Managing director, Southeast Bank Limited
25. Managing director, Social Islami Bank Limited
26. CEO, The Hongkong and Shanghai Banking Corporation Limited
27. Managing director, Standard Bank Limited
28. Managing director & CEO, Export Import Bank of Bangladesh Limited
29. Managing director & CEO, Mutual Trust Bank Limited
30. Managing director, BASIC Bank Limited
31. Managing director, Jamuna Bank Limited
32. President & managing director, Bank Asia Limited
33. Managing director, First Security Islami Bank Limited
34. Managing director & CEO, Meghna Bank Limited
35. Managing director, South Bangla Agriculture and Commerce Bank Limited
36. Managing director & CEO, NRB Commercial Bank Limited
37. Country director, WOORI Bank Limited

== Publications ==
The institute publishes a quarterly journal named Bank Parikrama. The main objective of the journal is to publish articles, notes, comments, etc. in the fields of banking, finance, economics and allied subjects. Submitted articles and notes are published based on the review report given by the experts of the relevant field. The journal has been progressively getting popularity over the years. The journal is available with Tk. 50.00 for the inland readers and with US$2.00 for foreign readers.

Bank Parikrama, a journal of banking & finance, is a quarterly journal of the Bangladesh Institute of Bank Management (BIBM) published in March, June, September and December each year.
