= First Finance Limited =

Financial Institution

- Formation: 1993
- Headquarters: Dhaka, Bangladesh
- Region served: Bangladesh
- Official language: Bengali
- Website: www.first-finance.com.bd

First Finance Limited is a major non-bank financial institution in Bangladesh. Khan Mohammad Moinul Hasan is the chairman of the First Finance Limited.

== History ==
First Finance Limited was established in 1993.

On 9 October 2003, First Finance Limited listed on the Dhaka Stock Exchange and Chittagong Stock Exchange.

First Finance Limited was fined .9 million taka for having a 74.2 million taka deficit in 2015. The shares of the company were listed as Z category of the Dhaka Stock Exchange.

In 2016, The Daily Star identified First Finance Limited as one of three financial institutions dragging the entire finance industry down. It was offering one of the highest interest rate on deposits.

In December 2017, First Finance Limited was fined 22.1 million taka for having a deficit of 2.22 billion taka by Bangladesh Bank. An investigation by Bangladesh Bank had found the former chairman of First Finance Limited, AQM Faruk Ahmed Chowdhury, had embezzled 40 million taka from the institute. Chowdhury resigned in April 2016 after the incident came to light and was replaced by his brother AQM Faisal Ahmed Chowdhury. Faisal defaulted on a seven million taka home loan from First Finance Limited. The institute had provided bad loans using forged documents to Al Madina Enterprise, Aftab Enterprise, Dolfin Car Centre, Hafijul Islam, Mabco Group, Mohammad Siddiqur Rahman, Munshi Traders, and Runa Trading Corporation.

On 25 January 2018, Md Nazrul Hossain was appointed the managing director of First Finance Limited.

Khan Mohammad Moinul Hasan, an independent director, became chairman of First Finance Limited in 2021. According to Bangladesh Bank, First finance had more than 10 per cent defaulted loans; the other institutes are Bangladesh Industrial Finance Company Limited, FAS Finance and Investment Limited, Fareast Finance and Investment Limited, GSP Finance Company (Bangladesh) Limited, Industrial and Infrastructure Development Finance Company Limited, International Leasing and Financial Services Limited, MIDAS Financing Limited, National Finance Limited, Premier Leasing and Finance Limited, Prime Finance and Investment Limited, Reliance Finance Limited, and Union Capital Limited. Bangladesh Bank placed restrictions on the institute providing loans of more than 10 million taka including taking written permission from Bangladesh Bank. The owner of Megh City Complex, Amjad Hossain, tried to secure a 150 million taka loan using a forged letter from Tanvir Shakil Joy, a member of parliament from Awami League in 2021. The institution lost significant value on the Dhaka Stock Exchange. In 2021, Bangladesh Commerce Bank Limited had found it difficult to recover 5.02 billion taka it had deposited with six non bank financial institutions including First Finance Limited. Bangladesh Bank questioned the aggressive SMS marketing by First Finance Limited. Mohammed Mosharaf Hossain was appointed managing director on 18 July.

Janata Bank was having difficulties recovering 540 million taka loan from FAS Finance and Investment Limited, First Finance Limited, and People's Leasing and Financial Services Limited. The Anti-Corruption Commission reported that the former managing director of First Finance Limited, Tuhin Reza, had embezzled 8.2 million taka. Gaus-ul-Wara Md Mortaza was appointed managing director of First Finance Limited in September 2022. Jiban Bima Corporation has found it difficult to recover 484.6 million taka deposit from First Finance Limited.
