= Bangladesh Commerce Bank =

Private Bank in Bangladesh

Bangladesh Commerce Bank Limited
- Company type: Private (Non-Government)
- Industry: Banking
- Founded: Dhaka, Bangladesh
- Headquarters: Dhaka, Bangladesh
- Key people: Dr. Engr. Rashid Ahmed Chowdhury (Chairman)
- Products: Banking services Consumer Banking; Corporate Banking; Investment Banking
- Net income: ▲
- Website: bcblbd.com

Bangladesh Commerce Bank Limited is a private sector commercial bank in Bangladesh.

== History ==
The bank can trace its origins to the former Bangladesh Commerce and Investment Limited, set up on 27 January 1986. It was a non-bank financial institution. In April 1992, its activities were suspended by Bangladesh Bank due to a liquidity crises. To protect the banking sector, the employees, and customers of the firm, it was changed into a bank by Bangladesh Bank. Bangladesh Commerce Bank Limited was incorporated on 1 June 1998. S Alam Group is an investor in the bank.

In August 2004, Bangladesh Bank placed in a watchlist of "problem banks". The bank donated to Prime Minister Khaleda Zia's relief fund. Md Enayet Ullah was appointed managing director of the bank.

A branch of the bank in Ashulia, Bangladesh was robbed on 21 April 2015. Nine people including the bank manager were killed. One of the robber was killed and 2 were captured out of an estimated 8-9 robbers. The attack was blamed on Islamic militants. 6 members Jama'atul Mujahideen Bangladesh (JMB) and Ansarullah Bangla Team were sentenced to death in the case and others were imprisoned.

In 2018, Bangladesh Commerce Bank Limited had 31.6 per cent bad loans.

In 2021, Bangladesh Commerce Bank Limited had found it difficult to recover 5.02 billion taka it had deposited with six non bank financial institutions. The institutions were Bangladesh Industrial Finance Company Limited, FAS Finance and Investment Limited, First Finance Limited, International Leasing and Financial Services Limited, Peoples Leasing and Financial Services Limited, and Premier Leasing and Finance Limited. Some of the institutions funds were embezzled by Prashanta Kumar Halder.

On 28 June 2022, Bangladesh Bank allowed Bangladesh Commerce Bank Limited to reschedule a 1.99 billion taka defaulted loan to SB Exim, which is owned by Shahjahan Bablu who faces allegations of money laundering through fake invoicing exports from the Bangladesh Financial Intelligence Unit. The bank overspent corporate social responsibility fund on disaster management. In July the bank launched sharia based banking services. Bangladesh Commerce Bank Limited filed a check dishonour case against Marrin Vegetable Oils Limited, a subsidiary of Nurjahan Group. The chairman of the group, Tipu Sultan and managing director, Jahir Ahmed, were sentenced to one year in jail in the case. Rashid Ahmed Chowdhury was re-elected chairman of the board in October 2022.

Following the fall of the Sheikh Hasina led Awami League government, Bangladesh Bank dissolved the board of directors of Bangladesh Commerce Bank Limited and appointed former Bangladesh Bank official, Md Ataur Rahman, chairperson of the bank.

== Board of directors ==
Name	Position	Profession
Md Ataur Rahman	Chairman	Former Executive Director, Bangladesh Bank
Shaikh Ashafuzzaman FCA	Independent Director	Chartered Accountant
Md Mohsin Miah	Independent Director	Additional Managing Director, Meghna Bank
Kamrul Hoque Maruf	Director	Joint Secretary, Financial Institutions Division, Ministry of Finance
Md Golam Mortuza	Director	Deputy Managing Director, Janata Bank
