= NI Khan =

Former education secretary of Bangladesh

Nazrul Islam Khan
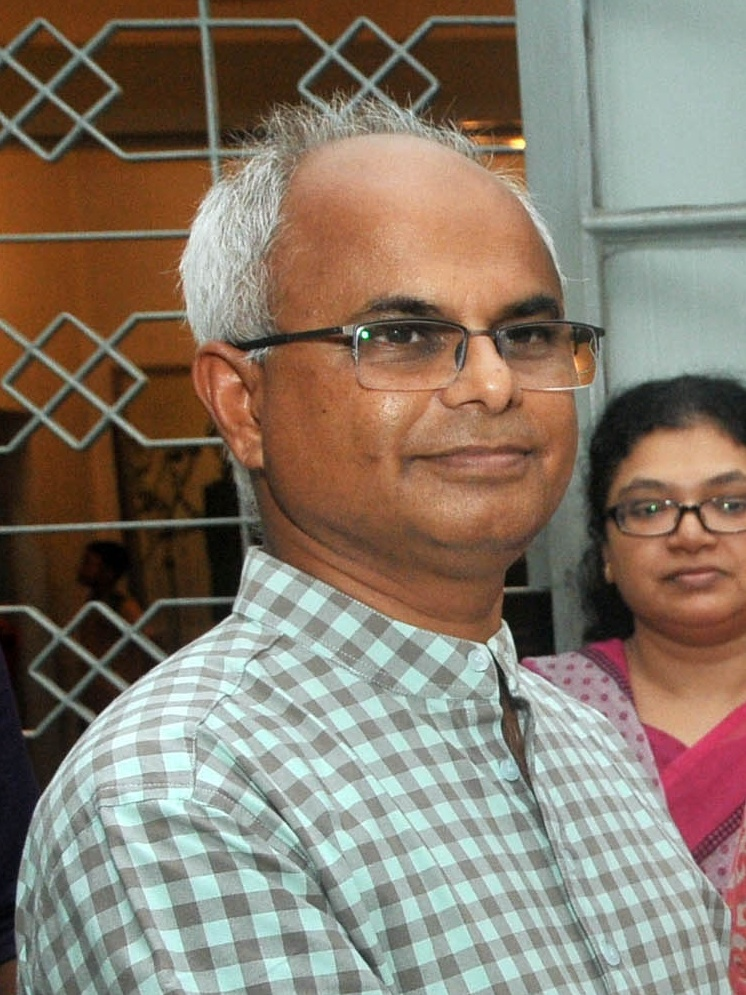
- Khan in 2017
- Born: 1 December 1956 (age 69); Mashwimnagar, Jessore
- Education: Diploma in Training and Development in Public Sector (DIPTD), Manchester University, UK.
- Organization: Curator at Father of the Nation Bangabandhu Sheikh Mujibur Rahman Memorial Museum
- Website: nikhan.org

Md Nazrul Islam Khan, also known as N I Khan, is a former education secretary of Bangladesh. He was the chairman and independent director of International Leasing and Financial Services Limited. He is also former PS-1 to Sheikh Hasina, both when she was the leader of the opposition in parliament and in the Prime Minister's Office.

== Career ==
Khan was the director general of the Directorate of Primary Education in 2008.

In September 2011, Khan was appointed secretary of the Ministry of Education. During his tenure he introduced online college admission; redesigned education institution infrastracture well adapted in rainy environments and aerial aesthetics; elected student cabinet in secondary educational institutions. Before that, Khan was the secretary of the Information and Communication Technology Division at the Ministry of Posts, Telecommunications and Information Technology. He was also the private secretary to Prime Minister Sheikh Hasina and national project director of the Access to information in Bangladesh program of the Prime Minister's Office.

Khan was appointed curator of the Bangabandhu Memorial Museum in March 2016.

Khan was the chairman of the National Wages and Productivity Commission; he was appointed chairman in 2016.

In November 2020, Khan was appointed the acting chairperson of Palli Sanchay Bank.

Khan was appointed the chairman of International Leasing and Financial Services Limited by the Company Bench of the High Court. In January 2021, another bench of the High Court Division issued an order banning his travel abroad following a petition filed by individuals who accused him of being involved with Prashanta Kumar Halder. The petitioners had been defrauded by People's Leasing and Financial Services and Prashanta Kumar Halder. The petitioner included Nashid Kamal, daughter of the former chief justice of Bangladesh, Mustafa Kamal. The Appellate Division of the Bangladesh Supreme Court set aside the order since he was never connected with People's Leasing and was appointed as the chairman of International Leasing by the Company Bench of the High Court.
