= Mohammed Matiul Islam =

Bangladeshi businessman (1930–2025)

His Excellency Mohammed Matiul Islam
- মোহাম্মদ মতিউল ইসলাম

1st Secretary at the Ministry of Finance of Bangladesh
- In office 17 January 1972 – 11 October 1973
- President: Abu Sayeed Chowdhury
- Prime Minister: Sheikh Mujibur Rahman
- Preceded by: Khandaker Asaduzzaman (Mujibnagar Government)
- Succeeded by: Kofil Uddin Mahmud

Personal details
- Born: 23 January 1930 Faridpur District, Bengal Presidency, British India
- Died: 20 November 2025 (aged 95) Dhaka, Bangladesh
- Spouse: Zohra Islam (m. 1958; died 2021)
- Children: 2
- Education: University of Dhaka (BCom); Harvard University (MPA)
- Occupation: Economist, diplomat

Mohammed Matiul Islam (Bengali: মোহাম্মদ মতিউল ইসলাম; 24 January 1930 – 20 November 2025) was a Bangladeshi diplomat and businessman. He was Bangladesh's envoy to the World Bank and later the United Nations for 8 and 11 years, respectively. He started 4 companies and was chairman of Industrial and Infrastructure Development Finance Company (IIDFC), a Bangladeshi financial services firm. He served as the first finance secretary of an independent Bangladesh.

== Career ==
Finally, in December, Indian Army forces bolstered by the Mukti Bahini liberated Dhaka, securing the Pakistani Army's surrender on 16 December. By 8 January, Zulfikar Ali Bhutto responded to international pressure and released Sheikh Mujib. He arrived back in Dhaka on the 10th, and sent for Islam on the 12th. By 17 January, Islam was appointed the first Finance Secretary of Bangladesh.

=== Government service in Bangladesh ===
==== Finance secretary ====
As he worked on building the country's financial system, Islam also travelled with Sheikh Mujib and the other heads of government, travelling first to Calcutta for talks with Indira Gandhi and the Indian Foreign minister in February. By March 1972 they were on their way to Moscow by way of Tbilisi, Georgian SSR. In Moscow, they were recognized by the Soviet Premier, Brezhnev and Alexei Kosygin, the Prime Minister. Talks eventually yielded an agreement for the Soviets to build a power plant in Ghorashal, as well as to assist in clearing mines, sunken ships and wreckage from the war out of Chittagong Harbour. Later in the year, Sheikh Mujib's delegation would visit Washington D.C. and London, and by September 1972 they had US $400 million in foreign currency reserves and the groundwork of a relationship with the IMF and World Bank.

==== World Bank ====
Islam joined the World Bank in October 1973. As Bangladesh's representative, he spearheaded the country's entry into the World Bank, International Monetary Fund and Asian Development Bank. Working as a block with India and Sri Lanka, Islam served as the Alternate Executive Director for Bangladesh while S.R. Sen served as the Executive Director. When Sen died of a heart attack, Islam took over his duties, managing Bangladesh's contributions to the IBRD, IDA, and IFC, the first two of which were both previously managed by Sen.

Islam served until July 1977, and campaigned vocally for equal treatment of even the poorest nations. For example, he campaigned against a proposed US Government Accountability Office audit of the World Bank on the grounds that all members of the bank were equal. If the US were to be given the opportunity to audit, then every other country should get that same opportunity. He worked closely with Robert McNamara, then President of the World Bank, to push for aid and assistance in debt restructuring, while in return working to eliminate barriers to foreign investment to make Bangladesh a more attractive investment opportunity. As Alternate Executive Director, he was also charged with ensuring that development projects made it through the bureaucracy with all necessary approvals so that work could begin in earnest.

During his time at the World Bank, Islam would return to Dhaka every six months to visit Sheikh Mujib. During the last of these visits, on 7 July 1975, Sheikh Mujib was trying to form his single political party BAKSAL as part of his campaign for one-party rule. He asked Islam to join, but Islam refused because he was a civil servant at heart, and thus had to remain apolitical. Mujib wanted Islam to return to Dhaka to help bolster what he knew was a tenuous position, but Islam refused on account of not wanting to disrupt his daughters' education in the US. Mujib offered to sign indefinite orders to keep Islam in the US, but Islam said he would return in a year. Eight days later, Sheikh Mujib was assassinated.

Islam finished his tenure with the World Bank in July 1977, and subsequently returned to the Government of Bangladesh as Secretary of Industry.

==== Secretary of Industry ====
As Secretary of Industry, Islam's job was to focus on the development of Bangladesh's private sector. His most notable achievement in this role was partnering with Dubai Bank, Limited to start Arab-Bangladesh Bank, now AB Bank, on 31 December 1981. However, with the assassination of Ziaur Rahman in 1981, Islam began looking for work away from the instability of the central government. As fate would have it, the Director-General of the United Nations Industrial Development Organization, or UNIDO, was visiting Dhaka at the time. Islam hosted him for dinner, and was offered a job at UNIDO 6 months later.

=== UNIDO ===
Islam spent twelve years at UNIDO, six in Vienna and six in Delhi. During his time in Vienna, he served as a Senior Industrial Development Field Adviser and liaison between UNIDO and the World Bank. The World Bank was reliant on consultant services provided by UNIDO, and Islam would match up World Bank projects in need of consultants with UNIDO personnel specialized in those areas. In 1987, he transferred to Delhi, and worked as the UNIDO director for India and Bhutan. At no cost India and Bhutan, he would find projects in those countries where UNIDO could contribute expertise and match them with personnel and resources from abroad. He helped to bring foreign direct investment, and led a matchmaking effort to pair investors with local companies.

=== Entrepreneurship ===
After finally retiring from government/NGO service in 1993, Islam would go on to start three major companies.

In 1996, Islam started International Leasing and Financial Services Limited, his first non-bank Financial Services company. In 1998, he followed with National Housing Finance and Investments Limited, a non-banking development financial institution. Islam resigned from the boards of both of these companies in 2004 and 2003, respectively, so he could focus on his primary business venture. He started Industrial and Infrastructure Development Finance Company Limited (IIDFC) in 2000 as a non-banking financial institution (NBFI) under the Financial Institutions Act of 1993. As an NBFI, IIDFC cannot open savings or chequing accounts, nor can it obtain letters of import. But it can accept term deposits, invest like a bank, and deal in foreign exchange. Since its inception, IIDFC has amassed 16.7 billion BDT (US$200 million) in assets as of 2015. Islam continued to serve as chairman, and also retained a 3% stake in the company.

In 2003, Islam helped to start the Credit Ratings Agency of Bangladesh, or CRAB, by partnering with the Indian Credit Rating Agency, ICRA. He most recently served as the vice-chairman of CRAB, in addition to his ongoing work as IIDFC Chairman.

In January 2023, Islam published his second memoir, "Recollections of a Civil Servant-Turned Banker (2019-2022)".

== Death ==
Islam died on 20 November 2025, at the age of 95.

== Awards and recognition ==
In 2010, Islam's company, IIDFC, was awarded the HSBC-The Daily Star Climate Award for Climate Change Mitigation. His company financed Bangladesh's first green brick project, introducing a technology that uses 50% less energy to manufacture bricks. In 2011, Islam won The DHL-Daily Star Lifetime Achievement Award for his aggregate accomplishments over six decades of work in accounting, finance, and international development.
