= Premier Leasing and Finance Limited =

Non-bank financial institution

- Industry: Financial services
- Founded: 1995; 31 years ago
- Headquarters: Dhaka, Bangladesh
- Key people: Md. Ashekur Rahman (Chairman), Subash Chandra Moulick FCS (Managing director current charge)
- Website: www.premierleasing.com.bd

Premier Leasing and Finance Limited, also known as PLFL, is a major non-bank financial institution in Bangladesh that provides leasing finance.

== History ==
Premier Leasing and Finance Limited was established on 26 September 2001 as Premier Leasing International Limited.

Bangladesh Securities and Exchange Commission approved initial public offering by Premier Leasing and Finance Limited in 2005. At the same time, it approved the IPO's of Progressive Life Insurance Company Limited, Sonar Bangla Insurance Company Limited, and Islamic Finance and Investment Limited.

In 2007, Premier Leasing International Limited was renamed to Premier Leasing and Finance Limited.

Mizanur Rahman Shelley was reelected chairman of Premier Leasing and Finance Limited in 2009. SM Shamsul Alam was appointed managing director of Premier Leasing and Finance Limited in 2010.

In June 2012, AZM Akramul Haq was re-elected chairman of Premier Leasing and Finance Limited.

SM Shamsul Alam was re-appointed managing director of Premier Leasing and Finance Limited in 2013. SM Shafiqul Islam Mamun was reelected chairman of Premier Leasing and Finance Limited in 2015. Abdul Hamid Mia was appointed the managing director of Premier Leasing and Finance Limited in 2016.

In 2019, almost 30 percent or 450 million taka of all loans of Premier Leasing and Finance Limited had defaulted. AZM Akramul Haq was elected chairman of Premier Leasing and Finance Limited in 2019. Its creditors, Bangladesh Commerce Bank Limited and Janata Bank Limited, were having difficulty recovering their money from it.

On 4 December 2020, Bangladesh Bank appointed AKM Mohiuddin Azad administrator of Premier Leasing and Finance Limited following an order of Bangladesh High Court. Bangladesh Bank refused to accept the resignation letter of Abdul Hamid Mia, the managing director of Premier Leasing and Finance Limited, in March 2021. During his tenure at the institution its financials declined significantly. The loans were defaulted with the help of Md. Shah Alam who was a senior official of Bangladesh Bank and an aid of swindler PK Halder. The total defaulted loan of Premier Leasing and Finance Limited stood at 7.66 billion taka. It has also failed to recover 1.94 billion taka deposit from BASIC Bank Limited.

Subash Chandra Moulick, managing director of Premier Leasing and Finance Limited, said it was finding it difficult to pay back large amounts to banks in February 2022. In April 2022, Md. Fazlur Rahman was appointed the managing director of Premier Leasing and Finance Limited. In August 2022, ASM Feroz Alam, vice-chairman of Mercantile Bank Limited, was elected chairman of Premier Leasing Securities, subsidiary of Premier Leasing and Finance Limited.

== Subsidiaries ==
- Premier Leasing Securities
- Premier Leasing Capital Management
- Premier Leasing Securities Broking
