= Janata Bank =

State-owned commercial bank of Bangladesh

Janata Bank PLC.
- Seal of Janata Bank PLC.
- Type: State-owned enterprise
- Industry: Financial services
- Predecessors: United Bank Limited and Union Bank Limited
- Founded: 1972; 54 years ago
- Headquarters: Motijheel, Dhaka, Bangladesh
- Key people: M Fazlur Rahman (Chairman) ‍and Md. Mazibur Rahman (Managing Director)
- Products: Banking services, consumer Banking, corporate Banking, investment Banking
- Net income: ▼BDT 30660.00 million (2024)
- Total assets: ▲BDT 1,387,058.68 million (2023)
- Number of employees: 12,391 (2017)
- Website: www.jb.com.bd

Janata Bank (Bengali: জনতা ব্যাংক পিএলসি) is a Bangladeshi state-owned commercial bank established in 1972. Its headquarters is situated at Motijheel in Dhaka, the capital city of Bangladesh.

As of 2017, it was the second largest commercial bank in Bangladesh and had 925 branches throughout the country, it also had 4 overseas branches in the United Arab Emirates.

== History ==
Following the independence of Bangladesh from Pakistan at the Bangladesh Liberation War of 1971, Janata Bank PLC was formed combining the then United Bank Limited and Union Bank Limited under the Bank Nationalization Ordinance of 1972 (President's Order 26).

In March 2004, managing director of the bank, Murshid Kuli Khan, visited Greece to study the feasibility of remittance from the country.

The management of Janata Bank was changed under the Enterprise Growth and Bank Modernization Project' (EGBMP) which has been taken in 2004–05 in order to reform the nationalized commercial banks. Janata Bank became a public limited companies on 15 November 2007 led by chairman Sohel Ahmed Chowdhury.

After Awami League came to power in 2008, they provided 145.05 billion taka in recapitalization funds to state banks including Janata Bank. In January 2008, SM Aminur Rahman, was appointed managing director of Janata Bank. Fahmida Khatun was appointed a director of the bank in August.

In 2012, Janata Bank recalled their CEO of operations in the United Arab Emirates, Shafiqul Islam, following the embezzlement of US$1.3 million. The Anti Corruption Commission questioned seven officials of the bank over the Hallmark-Sonali Bank Loan Scam. Bismillah Group had embezzled 12 billion taka from Janata Bank and four others.

In December 2017, Md Abdus Salam Azad was promoted to managing director of Janata Bank from deputy managing director.

Janata Bank provided loans worth 55.04 billion taka loan to AnonTex Group, led by chairperson Md Younus Badal, from 2007 to 2015 which defaulted. The loans were more than 25 percent of the capital base of Janata Bank in violation of banking rules. The loans were provided from the Janata Bhaban corporate branch under manager Md Abdus Salam Azad, who would later become the managing director of the bank. The loans were approved by the board of directors led by chairperson Abul Barkat and managing director SM Aminur Rahman. Shaikh Md Wahid-Uz-Zaman, who was the chairman from December 2014 to 2017, blamed the board of directors and management of the bank for the loans to AnonTex Group. AnonTex Group restructured their loan with a 1-2 percent payment rather than the customary 10-15 percent payment needed for restructuring. Bangladesh Bank had provided Janata Bank permission ignore overexposure rules for providing loans to Galaxy Sweaters and Yarn Dyeing, a subsidiary of AnonTex Group.

Bangladesh Bank sought an explanation of the loans to AnonTex Group from managing director of the bank, Md Abdus Salam Azad. The group had laundered the money outside of Bangladesh using false invoicing of capital machinery. The loans were provided following an approval letter by Mizanur Rahman Akon, deputy general manager of Bangladesh Bank, without approval of Financial Integrity and Customer Services Department. Janata Bank tried to delay the loans to AnonTex Group from being declared defaulted by Bangladesh Bank which allowed the group to borrow more money from the bank. The Minister of Finance AMA Muhith spoke in favor of AnonTex Group after meeting its chairperson.

The Bank had also loaned 12.3 billion taka to Thermax Group which also defaulted. It was 27 percent of the capital base of Janata Bank. The Bank provided 34.43 billion taka loan to Crescent Group which also defaulted. Crescent Group is owned by MA Kader and Abdul Aziz, two brothers, who also own Jaaz Multimedia. Anti-Corruption Commission had found Crescent Group embezzled money from Janata Bank while Customs Intelligence and Investigation Directorate reported that the group had laundered the money out of Bangladesh. Bangladesh Bank stopped Janata Bank from re-hiring Syful Shamsul Alam & Co as its audit company because it had found the company aided Crescent Group in embezzling money from the bank. Janata Bank was fined by Bangladesh Bank for providing undue favors to Beximco Group.

In 2016, Rajib Hasan, a senior officer of the bank embezzled 19.3 million taka from client accounts.

In 2018, the government sought to appointed Hedayetullah Al Mamun as chairman of the bank but reverse course following backlash against the appointment. The government instead appointed Luna Shamsuddoha, the first woman to head a state-owned bank in Bangladesh. Justices Zubayer Rahman Chowdhury and Md Iqbal Kabir of the High Court Division ordered Janata Bank to retake their recruitment test following the leak of the exam question papers.

Janata Bank sought to reschedule loans to Root Group which had 10.49 billion taka in defaulted loans in August 2019. Jamaluddin Ahmed was appointed chairman of Janata Bank in August 2019. He is a former director of Bangladesh Bank and the general secretary of the Bangladesh Economic Association. He replaced Dr SM Mahfuzur Rahman. On 28 July 2020, Ahmed was replaced by SM Mahfuzur Rahman as chairman of the bank. In 2020, a cashier of the bank in Noakhali District, Liton Chandra Das, stole 20 million taka from the bank. Janata Bank made a loss of move than 50 billion taka in 2020. Bangladesh Bank recommended actions against the managing director of the bank, Md. Abdus Salam Azad. AnonTex Group sought to reschedule its outstanding loans.

Janata Bank was having difficulty recovering money from non-banking financial institutions which were hit by scams by PK Halder. The institutions were Bangladesh Industrial Finance Company Limited, First Finance Limited, FAS Finance and Investment Limited, International Leasing and Financial Services Limited, Peoples Leasing and Financial Services Limited, and Premier Leasing and Finance Limited.

Janata Bank sought to auction assets of Pacific Denims Limited to recover its loan in 2022.

== Board of directors ==
Name	Designation	Reference
M. FAZLUR RAHMAN	Chairman	
Ajit Kumar Paul	Director	
K. M. Shamsul Alam	Director	
Muhammed Asad Ullah	Director	
Badre Munir Firdaus	Director	
Dr. Md. Mohiuddin	Director	
Dr. Md. Abdus Sabur	Director	
Md. Mazibur Rahman	CEO and Managing Director	
