= Fareast Finance and Investment Limited =

Bangladeshi financial institution

- Traded as: DSE: FAREASTFIN
- Industry: Financial services
- Founded: 21 June 2001
- Headquarters: Dhaka, Bangladesh
- Area served: Bangladesh
- Key people: Md. Ashraful Moqbul (chairman)
- Website: www.ffilbd.com

Fareast Finance and Investment (FFIL) is a major non-bank financial institution in Bangladesh providing leasing and loans. It is listed on the Dhaka Stock Exchange.

== History ==
Fareast Finance and Investment Limited was established on 21 June 2001.

MA Khaleque was elected chairman of Fareast Finance and Investment Limited in 2006. Khaleque was the founder of Prime Bank Limited and director of Northern General Insurance Company Limited. Md Monir Hosain was elected vice-chairman of Fareast Finance and Investment Limited. It was part of a 260 million taka syndicated loan to ALLTEX Industries led by One Bank Limited; Trust Bank Limited and Prime Finance and Investment Limited were the other partners.

In 2007, Bangladesh Bank asked Fareast Finance and Investment Limited to go for an initial public offering.

In 2010, Fareast Finance and Investment Limited was part of a United Commercial Bank led 2.5 billion taka loan for planned hospital in Chittagong, Imperial Hospital Limited. The other members of the syndicate were Bangladesh Commerce Bank Limited, Dutch-Bangla Bank, NRB Global Bank Limited, Shahjalal Islami Bank, and Standard Bank Limited. It had failed to offload its shares by 2010.

Santanu Saha was appointed managing director of Fareast Finance and Investment Limited on 29 June 2011.

In 2018, M Shamsul Islam Varosha, chairman of Varosha Match, replaced MA Khaleque as chairman of Fareast Finance and Investment Limited. Southeast Bank Limited signed an agreement to cooperate with Fareast.

Fareast Finance and Investment Limited report a loss for the 2020 fiscal year and the board voted against dividends for shareholders. Bangladesh Securities and Exchange Commission fined MA Khaleque, chairman of Fareast, and Rubaiyat Khaled, director of Fareast, for selling their shares without authorization. Since 2016, Fareast has not announced dividends for shareholders. Anti-Corruption Commission ordered former chairman MA Khaleque to not leave the country.

In 2022, Muhammad Ali Zaryab, managing director of Fareast Finance and Investment Limited, said Bangladesh Bank rescheduled it's defaulted loans from 20 banks except Dutch Bangla Bank Limited. The company shares had moved to the Z category in the Dhaka Stock Exchange and Bangladesh Securities and Exchange Commission reorganized the board of directors in March 2021 after finding irregularities with the management. It had lent 500 million taka to Proshanta Kumar Halder, a notorious swindler. Bangladesh Bank found former officials MA Khaleque, Shantanu Saha, Mohammad Hafizur Rahman, and Md Rafiqul Islam. 49.8 percent of the loans of Fareast had defaulted.

== Subsidiary ==
- Fareast Stocks and Bonds
