= BRAC Bank =

Private commercial bank in Bangladesh

BRAC Bank PLC.
- Company type: Public limited company
- Traded as: DSE: BRACBANK; CSE: BRACBANK
- Industry: Financial services Banking
- Founded: 4 July 2001; 24 years ago
- Founder: Fazle Hasan Abed
- Headquarters: Anik Tower, 220/B Tejgaon Gulshan Link Road, Tejgaon, Dhaka-1208; Dhaka, Bangladesh
- Number of locations: 194 Branch
- Key people: Meheriar M. Hasan (Chairperson); Tareq Refat Ullah Khan (Managing Director); M Masud Rana FCA (CFO); Anita Ghazi (Independent Director)
- Revenue: ▲ ৳28.727 billion (US$230 million) (2020)
- Operating income: ▲ ৳6.81 billion (US$55 million) (2021)
- Net income: ▲ ৳5.46 billion (US$44 million) (2021)
- Total assets: ▲ ৳527.91 billion (US$4.3 billion) (2021)
- Total equity: ▲ ৳76.95 billion (US$630 million) (2021)
- Number of employees: 7740 (2020)
- Parent: BRAC, IFC
- Subsidiaries: bKash Ltd. BRAC Saajan Exchange Ltd. BRAC EPL Investments Ltd. BRAC EPL Stock Brokerage Ltd.
- Website: bracbank.com

BRAC Bank PLC is a private commercial bank in Bangladesh, founded in 2001. The bank is a subsidiary of BRAC. BRAC Bank is known for its focus on small and medium-sized enterprises (SMEs).

The bank has a network of over 194 branch, 116 sub branches, 446 SME unit offices, over 385 ATMs, 10 CDMs, and 68 RCDMs across the country. In addition to traditional banking services such as deposits, loans, and cards, BRAC Bank also offers digital banking, including online banking, mobile banking, and e-wallet services.

== History ==
BRAC Bank was founded on 4 July 2001 to serve the large unbanked population excluded from traditional banking services. The main concept of the bank was to facilitate small and medium enterprises. BRAC Bank was founded by Fazle Hasan Abed, the founder of BRAC and BRAC University.

In 2005, BRAC Bank established BRAC Afghanistan Bank in 2006 as a greenfield venture.

In February 2008, the CEO and managing director of BRAC Bank, Imran Rahman, died in Canada. In May 2008, the bank decided to purchase a majority stake in GSP Finance Company (Bangladesh) Limited. Muhammad A. (Rumee) Ali was appointed chairman of BRAC Bank Limited. Muhammad A. (Rumee) Ali was a deputy governor of Bangladesh Bank and had joined BRAC in 2007.

In August 2009, BRAC Bank purchased 51 per cent of Equity Partners Limited and Equity Partners Securities Limited. They are later renamed to BRAC EPL Stock Brokerage Limited and BRAC EPL Investments Limited. BRAC Saajan Exchange Limited was established in 2011 through the purchase of Saajan Worldwide Money Transfer Limited, established in 2009, in Great Britain. BRAC Bank sponsored Wasfia Nazreen seven summit expedition.

In September 2014, a robbery took place at the Joypurhat District branch of BRAC Bank Limited. Rapid Action Battalion arrested the suspects and recovered some of the stolen money in September.

Ahsan H Mansur was appointed chairman of BRAC Bank on 27 August 2019, replacing Sir Fazle Hasan Abed after he retired. Its half-yearly profit saw a 50 per cent decline.

BRAC Bank filed an appeal on 19 October 2020 with the Appellate Division seeking a stay order on a verdict of the Bangladesh High Court, which ordered the bank to pay 1.5 million BDT to Jaha Alam, who had served three years wrongly in a case filed by BRAC.

BRAC Bank received US$30 million in April from the International Finance Corporation. In August 2021, BRAC Bank planned to raise six billion BDT through issuing bonds.

In September 2022, Bangladesh Bank ordered BRAC Bank to spend 50 per cent of their profits from foreign exchange trading, deemed unethical by Bangladesh Bank, on corporate social responsibility programs. On 28 September, it opened its 800th agent banking branch. It had approved 15 per cent dividends for stock holders. It increased the salary of junior-grade officers by 50 per cent. It had a total asset of 611 billion BDT as of 2022. It launched a digital loan app called Shubidha.

On 11 January 2023, BRAC Bank borrowed US$50 million from the German Investment Corporation. It donated 40 million BDT to Prime Minister Sheikh Hasina's Ashrayan-2 project. BRAC Bank opened its 1000th agent banking outlet in February 2023.

== Financial services ==
- SME Banking
- Retails Banking
- Card Service (Credit & Debit)
- Foreign Exchange & Related Services
- Wholesale Banking & Custodial Service
- Probashi Banking
- Agent Banking

== Distribution network ==
- Business Region: 7
- Total Branches (Including SME SC/KB): 193
- Zonal Offices: 185
- Premium Lounges: 18
- ATMs: 375
- CDMs: 96
- SME Unit Office: 446
- Agent Banking Outlet: 1,100
- Remittance Delivery Point : 1800

== Subsidiaries ==
The subsidiaries are

- BRAC EPL Investments Limited
- BRAC EPL Stock Brokerage Limited
- bKash (Mobile banking service) Limited
- BRAC Saajan Exchange Limited
- BRAC IT Services Limited
- Astha

== ATM network ==
BRAC Bank has its own ATM network which is currently 457. In addition to this BRAC Bank is the lead arranger of OMNIBUS shared ATM network.

OMNIBUS, an association of member institutions, which will provide shared ATM and POS network facilities to banks through a neutral mother switch. OMNIBUS was formed as a result of a need for a neutral and centralized gateway. And as a result BRAC Bank took the initiative. And with BRAC Bank, Q-Cash came forward with its members to join hands to form OMNIBUS.

== Cricket sponsorship ==
The bank is the official kit sponsor for the Bangladesh national cricket team, Under-19 cricket team, Bangladesh women cricket team for the period of 2018 to 2020, meanwhile, the organisation is the kit partner for the team since 2016 and renewed their term until January 2020

== See also ==
- IDLC Finance Limited
- IDLC Investments Limited
- List of banks in Bangladesh
- Bangladesh Bank
