= Sheikh Mohammad Wahid Uz Zaman =

Sheikh Mohammad Wahid Uz Zaman is a retired secretary, principal secretary to the Prime Minister's Office of Prime Minister Sheikh Hasina, and chairman of Janata Bank.

== Early life ==
Zaman's mother was Nur Jahan Goni. His father was M. A. Ghani, founder of Ramapal College in Bagerhat District. He fought in the Bangladesh Liberation War. He studied political science at the University of Dhaka.

== Career ==
Zaman joined the Bangladesh Civil Service in 1979.

Zaman was the chairman of Centre for Environmental and Geographic Information Services. He was chairman of Institute of Water Modelling. Zaman was the secretary of the Ministry of Science and Technology in 2008.

Zaman was the secretary of the Ministry of Water Resources in 2010. It was speculated he would be made Cabinet Secretary in 2011. In October 2011, he was appointed principal secretary to the Prime Minister's Office.

Zaman's term as principal secretary to the Prime Minister's Office of Prime Minister Sheikh Hasina ended in February 2014. He served with Molla Waheeduzzman and Abdus Sobhan Golap. Abdus Sobhan Sikder succeeded Zaman as the principal secretary.

In December 2014, Zaman was appointed chairman of Janata Bank replacing Abul Barkat. He denied allegations of disbursing irregular loans against him. He blamed the board of directors and management of the bank for the loans to AnonTex Group. Initially Hedayetullah Al Mamun was appointed to replace him but following criticism Luna Shamsuddoha was appointed chairman.

Following the fall of Sheikh Hasina led Awami League government, the Anti Corruption Commission began an investigation into former bureaucrats such as Zaman, Kabir Bin Anwar, Khandaker Anwarul Islam, Kamal Abdul Naser Chowdhury, Mohammad Shafiul Alam, Mohammad Musharraf Hossain Bhuiyan, Ahmad Kaikaus, Abdus Sobhan Sikder, Abul Kalam Azad.
