= Industrial and Infrastructure Development Finance Company Limited =

- Formation: 2000
- Headquarters: Dhaka, Bangladesh
- Region served: Bangladesh
- Official language: Bengali
- Website: iidfc.com

Industrial and Infrastructure Development Finance Company Limited (IIDFC) is a non-bank financial institution in Bangladesh. Md Golam Sarwar Bhuiyan is the managing director of Industrial and Infrastructure Development Finance Company Limited.

Financial scamster Prashanta Kumar Halder was the managing director of Industrial and Infrastructure Development Finance Company Limited in 2008.

== History ==
Industrial and Infrastructure Development Finance Company Limited was established in 2000. Mohammed Matiul Islam, first finance secretary of Bangladesh, was the founding chairman. It received its license on 23 January 2001 from Bangladesh Bank.

In February 2007, Investment Promotion Financing Facility became eligible to participate in the Investment Promotion Financing Facility organized by International Development Association and Bangladesh Bank. Bangladesh Bank, under governor Salehuddin Ahmed, asked it to float its shares on the stock exchange. It led a syndicated loan for Charka Textile Limited, a subsidiary of PRAN-RFL Group. It provided 1.93 billion BDT loan to BSRM Iron and Steel Co Limited, a subsidiary of BSRM Group.

The deputy managing director of Industrial and Infrastructure Development Finance Company Limited Proshanta Kumar Halder was appointed the managing director of Reliance Finance in 2009. The Daily Star would later describe him as the Sultan of Swindle after he scammed 102 billion BDT from financial institutions. Another co-worker of Halder at Industrial and Infrastructure Development Finance Company Limited, Uzzal Kumar Nandi became chairman of People's Leasing and Financial Services Limited and helped Halder in his scams.

In 2010, M Matiul Islam, chairman of Industrial and Infrastructure Development Finance Company Limited, signed a cooperation agreement with HP Kumar, chairman of National Small Industries Corporation, for technical support to establish an ICT village in Bangladesh. It was the issue manager of 1.1 billion BDT bonds of Bank Asia as approved by Bangladesh Securities and Exchange Commission. It worked with World Bank to finance Hybrid Hoffman Kilns in Bangladesh.

Bangladesh Bank fined Industrial and Infrastructure Development Finance Company Limited in 2022 relocating the Uttara branch without proper approval. On 5 January, Md. Ataur Rahman Prodhan, former managing director of Sonali Bank, was appointed Chairman of Industrial and Infrastructure Development Finance Company Limited.
