= Bangladesh Stock Exchange =

Bangladesh Stock Exchange may refer to:

- Dhaka Stock Exchange (founded 1954)
- Chittagong Stock Exchange (founded 1995)
