= Nitol Niloy Group =

Bangladeshi business

- Formation: 1980
- Headquarters: Dhaka, Bangladesh
- Region served: Bangladesh
- Official language: Bengali
- Revenue: ▲US$128 million (2017)
- Staff: 3,170
- Website: www.nitolniloy.com.bd

Nitol Niloy Group (Bengali: নিটল নিলয় গ্রুপ) is a Bangladeshi diversified conglomerate based in Dhaka. Its primary business is the import and distribution of Tata Motors vehicles in Bangladesh. Abdul Matlub Ahmad is the chairperson of Nitol Niloy Group. Selima Ahmad is the vice-chairperson of Nitol Niloy Group.

== History ==
Nitol Niloy Group was established in January 1980 as Nitol Motors Limited, an importer of vehicles.

Nitol Motors Limited became the distributor of Tata Motors in Bangladesh in 1988.

In 1991, Nitol started assembling trucks and buses for Tata in Bangladesh.

Niloy Cement Clinkerization started operations in September 2007. It was the first cement clinkerization plant in Bangladesh.

The group has an annual turnover of 5 billion taka in 2010.

Nitol-Niloy Group led a delegation of Bangladeshi companies to Uganda in May 2011. It announced plans to invest US$12.5 million to develop rice cultivation in Uganda. It signed an agreement with Amrit Group to develop a poultry industry in Bangladesh. It opened a driving school in Kishoreganj District called Nitol-Tata Driving Training Institute.

Nitol Niloy Group controlled FAS Finance and Investment. It pulled out its investment from FAS Finance and Investment and the company was taken over by PK Halder who embezzled 13 billion taka funds from the financial institute.

Nitol Niloy Group signed an agreement with Hero MotoCorp to invest US$40 million to establish a motorcycle plant on 20 April 2014.

In 2016, Nitol Niloy Group requested permission from Bangladesh Bank to invest US$7 million in Gambia but were denied permission. Later Finance Minister A. H. M. Mostafa Kamal, who is in favor of foreign investments by Bangladeshi companies, requested them to submit a detailed investment plan to the central bank which they failed to do.

Nitol Niloy Group announced plans to assemble Tata pickups under Nita Company Limited, a joint venture with Tata Motors, in September 2018. Production was scheduled to begin in 2020. The project suffered delays due to the COVID-19 pandemic in Bangladesh. The company had also expressed an interest in assembling small cars of Tata in Bangladesh. Bangladesh is the fourth largest market for Tata motors. It is also delayed the launch of an electric vehicle assembled in Bangladesh due to the pandemic.

Nitol Niloy Group is part of the Star Infrastructure Development Consortium which has 17 Bangladeshi conglomerates. Star Infrastructure Development Consortium plans to open a US$3.5 billion steel plant in Chittagong in partnership with Kunming Iron & Steel Holding Company Limited. It also has a joint venture with Hero Group to produce motorcycles in Bangladesh.

In February 2019, Nitol Niloy Group received a license from the Bangladesh Economic Zones Authority to establish Kishoreganj Economic Zone. The group planned to invest 3 billion taka to develop the 84-acre site.

== Businesses ==
- Nitol Motors Limited
- Nitol Curtis Paper Mills Limited (Tarzan Paper)
- Nitol Insurance
- Nitol Electronics Limited
- Niloy Cement Industries Limited
- Niloy Cement Clinkerisation Industries Limited
- VIP-Nitol Industries Limited
- Kishoreganj Economic Zone
- NTrack Vehicle Tracking Service
- Radio Next
