= Delta Brac Housing Finance Corporation =

DBH Finance PLC.
- Company type: Public company
- Traded as: DSE: DBH; CSE: DBH
- Industry: Real estate finance
- Founded: 1996; 30 years ago
- Headquarters: Dhaka, Bangladesh
- Area served: Bangladesh
- Key people: Nasimul Baten (MD & CEO)
- Products: Loans: Credit card, Car loan, Marriage Loan, Home Loan, Apartment Loan, Home Construction Loan, Housing Plot Loan, Home Extension Loan, Home Improvement Loan, Home Owner's Family Loan, Flexi Plus Home Loan; Deposits: Annual Income Deposit, Annual Plus Income, Monthly Income Deposit, Quarterly Income Deposit, Cumulative Deposit, Flexible Fixed Deposit, Profit First Deposit, Easy Way Deposit, Children's Deposit, Easy Home Deposit
- Revenue: ▲BDT 3,065.0 million (2011)
- Net income: ▲BDT 907.0 million (2011)
- Website: dbhfinance.com

DBH Finance PLC. (also known as DBH) is a private sector non-bank financial institution in Bangladesh. It is a public limited company listed in Dhaka Stock Exchange and Chittagong Stock Exchange. It was established in 1996 by an international joint venture and started its operation in 1997. DBH specialises in real estate finance. DBH is the only financial institution in Bangladesh that has been receiving the highest credit rating of 'AAA' for 18 consecutive years.

== History ==
DBH commenced its operation in 1997 as an international joint venture to promote private sector real estate financing in Bangladesh. There were 5 promoters in the initiative out of which 3 were local & 2 were international promoters. Their local promoters were Delta Life Insurance Company Limited, BRAC & Green Delta Insurance Company Limited. International sponsors included HDFC & IFC.

Initially the company was formed as a private limited company and shareholding of the company was as follows:

| Sponsor | % of shareholding |
|---|---|
| Delta Life Insurance Company Limited | 25% |
| BRAC | 25% |
| Green Delta Insurance Company Limited | 20% |
| HDFC | 15% |
| IFC | 15% |

In 2008, the company became a public limited company and went for initial public offering (IPO). In the IPO, the company raised Taka 50 million issuing 500,000 ordinary shares. As of December 2012, the company has paid up a capital of Taka 1.16 billion. Current structure of shareholding of DBH is as follows:

| Sponsor | % of shareholding |
|---|---|
| Delta Life Insurance Company Limited | 17.34% |
| BRAC | 18.39% |
| Green Delta Insurance Company Limited | 15.31% |
| HDFC | 12.22% |
| IFC | 12.22% |
| General Public | 24.52% |

== About the company ==
DBH is considered a market leader in the private sector real estate financing in Bangladesh. It has provided home loans to more than 23,000 clients so far. DBH has a very good credit rating. It has been receiving highest credit rating of 'AAA' for 18 consecutive years.
