= Mizanur Rahman Shelley =

Bangladeshi politician (1943–2019)

- মীজানূর রহমান শেলী
- Born: 2 January 1943; Munshiganj District, Bengal Presidency, British India
- Died: 12 August 2019 (aged 76); Dhaka, Bangladesh
- Spouse: Sufia Rahman
- Children: 2

Mizanur Rahman Shelley (2 January 1943 – 12 August 2019) was a minister of the Government of Bangladesh, political analyst, political scientist and educationalist.

== Biography ==
Shelley was born on 2 January 1943 in Munshiganj District's Kusumpur Village. After completing his study from University of Dhaka he joined its Political Science Department as a teacher. In 1967, he resigned from the post and joined government service. He then obtained a PhD from the University of London in International Politics.

He resigned from government service in 1980. He was the director of Social Welfare Department at that time. He served as Minister of Information and Water Resources in 1990.

Shelley was the founding chairman of the Center for Development Research Bangladesh and editor of Asian Affairs. He was also the chairman of Premier Leasing and Finance. He was the advisory editor of the weekly Sochitro Swadesh and trust chairman of the Bangladesh Times. His writings were published in national dailies of Bangladesh. He wrote books about sociology and politics. He also wrote books covering other topics.

In 2008 he received an honorary fellowship from the Bangla Academy.

== Personal life ==
Shelley was married to Sufia Rahman. She died in 2016. They had two sons, Tahmid Ibne Mizan and Arif Ibne Mizan.

On the day of Eid al-Adha 1440 Hijri, Shelley died in Bangabandhu Sheikh Mujib Medical University Hospital of Dhaka on 12 August 2019 at the age of 76.
