= Radio Next =

Defunct Bangladeshi radio station

Radio Next; রেডিও নেক্সট
- Dhaka, Dhaka Division; Bangladesh
- Frequency: 93.2 MHz

Programming
- Language: Bengali

History
- First air date: 6 May 2015; 11 years ago

Links
- Webcast: Play Store; iOS
- Website: www.radionext.fm

Radio Next (Bengali: রেডিও নেক্সট) was a Bangladeshi Bengali-language privately owned FM radio station owned by the Nitol Niloy Group, broadcast on the frequency 93.2 MHz. It began test broadcasts on 27 January 2015 as the twelfth FM radio station in the country, after gaining approval from the government in 2013. The station officially launched on 6 May 2015 to audiences in the Dhaka Division and surrounding areas, only airing entertainment programming.

Radio Next claimed to be the first radio station in Bangladesh to broadcast live on its Facebook page. For its third anniversary in 2018, it used the tagline, "The Happiest Radio On Earth". It even announced to open up ten more stations throughout Bangladesh by 2020. However, the station later went off the air without any announcement.

== Programs ==
=== Regular shows ===
- The RJ Farhan Show (RJ Farhan)
- Evening (RJ Armeen)
- LOL (RJ Aongon)
- Midday Madness (RJ VXL)
- Breakfast Beat (RJ Shantu)

=== Weekend shows ===
- Euphoria (RJ Ahona)
- Global Grooves (RJ Nahiyan)
- Bhalobasha (RJ Kumkum)
- Listener's Diary (RJ Farhan)
- (RJ Armeen)
- Double A Battery (RJ Abonee & RJ Aongon)
- (RJ Kumkum)

=== Celebrity show ===
- Friendz Uncut (Tamim Mridha & Shouvik Ahmed)
