= Aviva Finance Limited =

Non-bank financial institution

- Formation: 1996
- Headquarters: Dhaka, Bangladesh
- Region served: Bangladesh
- Official language: Bengali
- Website: avivabd.com

Aviva Finance Limited is a sharia complaint major non-bank financial institution in Bangladesh. It was formerly called Reliance Finance Limited. Mohammed Saiful Alam is the chairman of Aviva Finance Limited and also S. Alam Group. The former managing director of Reliance Finance Limited, Proshanta Kumar Halder, embezzled from Reliance and other financial institutions in Bangladesh through fraudulent loans. According to the Anti-Corruption Commission Proshanta Kumar Halder stole 102 billion taka. The Daily Star gave Proshanta Kumar Halder the name sultan of swindle.

== History ==
Aviva Finance Limited started as Bahrain Bangladesh Finance and Investment Company Limited in 1996. Mascot Finance Company Limited invested in 2000 and was renamed to Oman Bangladesh Leasing & Finance Limited. In 2003, the foreign investors sold all their shares.

In March 2009, S. Alam Group purchased most of the shares except a small portion held by the National Life Insurance Company Limited. It is listed on the Dhaka Stock Exchange and Chittagong Stock Exchange. Mohammed Saiful Alam, chairman of S. Alam Group, has been the chairman of Aviva Finance Limited since March 2009. Proshanta Kumar Halder became managing director of Reliance Finance in 2009 before that he was in the Industrial and Infrastructure Development Finance Company Limited.

In 2010, the government of Bangladesh was encouraging non-bank financial institutions, including Reliance Finance, to list on the stock market.

In 2015, Proshanta Kumar Halder left Reliance Finance and joined NRB Global Bank as managing director.

On 19 November 2020, Reliance Finance Limited was renamed to Aviva Finance Limited and became an Islamic finance company. Bangladesh Bank approved the name change and gave them permission to open five new branches despite the institute failing to meet the requirements for opening new branches. The name change was due to the former managing director of the company, Proshanta Kumar Halder, embezzling funds from this and other financial institutions. The other institutions robbed by Halder and his associates were Bangladesh Industrial Finance Company Limited, FAS Finance and Investment Limited, International Leasing and Financial Services Limited, and Peoples Leasing and Financial Services Limited. Bangladesh Securities and Exchange Commission ordered the seizure of Halder's assets.

In 2022, Aviva Finance Limited offered the highest interest rate on deposits of all non-bank financial institutions in Bangladesh. On 14 May, Proshanta Kumar Halder was arrested from West Bengal, India.

== Subsidiary ==
- Reliance Brokerage Services
