= Mercantile Bank (Bangladesh) =

Bank of Bangladesh

Mercantile Bank PLC
- Type: Public
- Traded as: DSE: MERCANBANK; CSE: MERCANBANK
- Industry: Banking
- Founded: 1999; 27 years ago
- Headquarters: Dhaka, Bangladesh
- Services: Retail banking; Corporate finance; Islamic finance; Asset management; Capital markets
- Number of employees: 2,305 (2018)
- Website: www.mblbd.com

Mercantile Bank PLC is a commercial bank headquartered in Dhaka, Bangladesh.

== History ==
Mercantile Bank is a public limited company with limited liability under the bank companies act, 1991. Its share are listed in Dhaka Stock Exchange and Chittagong Stock Exchange. The bank provide products and services in retail banking, corporate finance, Islamic finance, asset management, equity brokerage and security. It has 153 branches in Bangladesh and employs around 2,300 employees.

In April 2009, Mohammad Abdul Jalil, a former Awami League Commerce Minister, was elected chairman of Mercantile Bank.

Md Abdul Jalil was re-elected chairman of Mercantile Bank in April 2012.

On 9 January 2013, M Ehsanul Haque was appointed managing director of Mercantile Bank. In May 2013, Bangladesh Bank found a director of Mercantile Bank, Md Shahabuddin Alam, was involved with illegal transaction involving subsidiaries of SA Group of Industries. M Amanullah was elected chairman of Mercantile Bank.

Bangladesh Bank appointed an observer to Mercantile Bank in November 2014.

In January 2016, Kazi Masihur Rahman was appointed managing director of Mercantile Bank.

Bangladesh Bank investigation in February 2018 found that the bank violated rules regarding cash incentive for exports. The Anti-Corruption Commission sued four directors of Mercantile Bank, Akram Hossain Humayun, M Amanullah, Md Anwarul Haque, and Mohd Selim, in December 2018 for helping Patrick Fashions and Kazi Farhad Hossain secure a loan mortgaging government property.

From 17 to 21 February 2019, Mercantile Bank suspended all activities as it was shifting its data center. Md Quamrul Islam Chowdhury was appointed managing director of Mercantile Bank. Morshed Alam, chairman of Bengal Group of Industries and member of parliament from Awami League, was appointed chairman of Mercantile Bank in July.

In January 2020, Bangladesh Bank removed a director of Mercantile Bank, Md Shahidul Ahsan, over allegations of money laundering.

Bangladesh Bank removed a director of Mercantile Bank, AKM Shaheed Reza, for being involved in irregular loans in April 2021. Reza was investigated by Bangladesh Financial Intelligence Unit and the Financial Integrity and Customer Services Department of Bangladesh Bank who found his involvement in irregular loans with PK Halder. Morshed Alam was reappointed chairman of Mercantile Bank.

In March 2022, Bangladesh Securities and Exchange Commission approved Mercantile Bank Unit Fund, an open-ended mutual fund. In July, Mercantile Bank announced plans to buy commercial real-estate from its chairman, Morshed Alam, in Noakhali District from 81.5 million BDT.

== Subsidiaries ==
- Mercantile Bank Securities Limited.
- Mercantile Exchange House (UK) Limited
- MBL Asset Management Limited

== Board of directors ==
Name	Position	Reference
Morshed Alam	Chairman	
A. S. M. Feroz Alam	Vice-Chairman	
Md. Abdul Hannan	Vice-Chairman	
Md. Anwarul Haque	Director	
M. Amanullah	Director	
Gazi Mohammad Hasan Jamil	Director	
Akram Hossain Humayun	Director	
Mosharref Hossain	Director	
M. A. Khan Belal	Director	
Mohammad Abdul Awal	Director	
Md. Rezaul Kabir	Director	
Md. Quamrul Islam Chowdhury	Managing Director	

== See also ==
- Mercantile Bank (disambiguation)
- List of banks in Bangladesh
