= UAE-Bangladesh Investment Company Limited =

- Formation: 1987
- Headquarters: Dhaka, Bangladesh
- Region served: Bangladesh
- Official language: Bengali
- Chairman: Mr. Khalil Fadhel Almansoori
- Website: ubinco.com

UAE-Bangladesh Investment Company Limited (UBICO) is financial institution owned by the Government of Bangladesh and the Abu Dhabi Fund for Development. Mr. M. M. Mostafa Bilal is the Managing Director of UAE-Bangladesh Investment Company Limited.

== History ==
United Arab Emirates led by Zayed bin Sultan Al Nahyan signed an agreement with Bangladesh to establish UAE-Bangladesh Investment Company Limited in 1986. The company became operational in 1987 with 60 percent share owned by Abu Dhabi Fund for Development and the rest by the government of Bangladesh. UAE-Bangladesh Investment Company Limited received permission from Bangladesh Bank in 1995 to operate as a financial institution.

In 2003, SM Akbar was appointed Managing Director of UAE-Bangladesh Investment Company Limited. UBICO gave 6.31 million taka in dividends in 2005. UBICO declared a four percent dividend for shareholders for the year 2006; the majority of the investments was in the garments industry and the healthcare industry.

In April 2010, Bangladesh Bank exempted UAE-Bangladesh Investment Company Limited, Infrastructure Development Company Limited, and Saudi-Bangladesh Industrial and Agricultural Investment Company Limited from listing on the stock market. The exemption was confirmed by UAE-Bangladesh Investment Company Limited company secretary Mumlook Hossain.

Managing director of UAE-Bangladesh Investment Company Limited, SM Akbar, signed an agreement with International Leasing and Financial Services Limited to finance joint investment projects in 2011.

On 30 May 2013, the Minister of Finance Abul Mal Abdul Muhith spoke at a function of UAE-Bangladesh Investment Company Limited and projected a 6.3 percent growth in GDP.

On 9 June 2014, Chairman of UAE-Bangladesh Investment Company Limited Dr Aslam Alam, who is also the secretary of the Bank and Financial Institutions Division under the Ministry of Finance, handed over 7.2 million taka to the Minister of Finance Abul Mal Abdul Muhith as dividends on the shares owned by the government.

Abu Dhabi Fund for Development provided funding through UAE-Bangladesh Investment Company Limited to various development projects in Bangladesh such as Chittagong Urea Fertilizer Limited, Shikalbaha Power Station, South Asia Subregional Economic Cooperation Road Connectivity Project, Teesta irrigation project, etc. Ashadul Islam is the deputy chairperson of UAE-Bangladesh Investment Company Limited and non-executive chairperson of Sonali Bank (UK) Ltd and director of Bangladesh Bank.

On 15 July 2019, the UAE-Bangladesh Investment Company Limited held its 31st annual general meeting. The meeting was chaired by Ahmed Al Murar, chairman of UAE-Bangladesh Investment Company Limited. The meeting declared a 15 percent dividend for 2018.

== Board of directors ==
- Mr. Khalil Fadhel Almansoori
- Sheikh Mohammad Salim Ullah
- Alya Abdullah Al Suwaidi
- Mushfeka Ikfat
- Mohammed Farooque Shaikh
