= Bangladesh Infrastructure Finance Fund Limited =

Non-bank financial institution

- Formation: 2011
- Headquarters: Dhaka, Bangladesh
- Region served: Bangladesh
- Official language: Bengali
- Website: biffl.org.bd

Bangladesh Infrastructure Finance Fund Limited (Bengali: বাংলাদেশ অবকাঠামো ফিনান্স ফান্ড লিমিটেড) is a Bangladesh government owned non-bank financial institution with the purpose of encouraging investment in the infrastructure in Bangladesh. Bangladesh Infrastructure Finance Fund Limited and Infrastructure Development Company Limited are two government owned financial institutions responsible for financing infrastructure development in Bangladesh.

== History ==
Bangladesh Infrastructure Finance Fund Limited was established in 2011 with the Ministry of Finance being a shareholder. It was created with the aim to invest in large infrastructure projects like power plants, roads, ports, etc. On 11 March 2011, the company was incorporated with a paid up capital of 16 billion taka and obtained its license on 16 October from Bangladesh Bank. Its first loan for an energy company was to Sinha People's Energy Limited. Its first financing of an economic zone was a loan to Srihatta Economic Zone. It loaned 3.65 billion taka to Bangladesh Economic Zones Authority for the development of Srihatta Economic Zone in Sylhet.

Bangladesh Infrastructure Finance Fund Limited provides funding for Public-private partnerships in Bangladesh. It had provided 21 billion taka financing to 26 Public-private partnership projects by 2017.
