= Rupali Bank =

Government-owned Bank in Bangladesh

Rupali Bank PLC.
- Type: Public Limited Company
- Traded as: DSE: RUPALIBANK
- Industry: Financial services
- Predecessors: Muslim Commercial Bank; Australasia Bank; Standard Bank
- Founded: 1972; 54 years ago
- Headquarters: Dhaka, Bangladesh
- Number of locations: 586
- Area served: Bangladesh & Overseas
- Key people: Md. Nazrul Huda (Chairman); Kazi Md. Wahidul Islam (Managing Director)
- Products: Banking services, ATM services, Corporate Banking; Investment Banking Mobile Banking
- Number of employees: 6000+
- Website: rupalibank.com.bd

Rupali Bank (Bengali: রূপালী ব্যাংক পিএলসি.) is a Bangladeshi state owned commercial bank that operates across Bangladesh. Its headquarters is in 34 Dilkusha, Dhaka. Md. Nazrul Huda is the chairman of the bank. Kazi Md. Wahidul Islam is the managing director of the bank.

== History ==
Rupali Bank Limited was constituted with the merger of 3 erstwhile commercial banks i.e. Muslim Commercial Bank Limited, Australasia Bank Limited and Standard Bank which operated in the then East Pakistan on 26 March 1972, under the Bangladesh Banks (Nationalization) Order 1972.

Rupali Bank worked as a nationalized commercial bank until 13 December 1986. When the bank went public, but the majority of the shares were still retained by the Government. Rupali Bank Limited emerged as the largest Public Limited Banking Company of the country on 14 December 1986.

Rupali Bank automated its foreign exchange services in January 1999.

From 1994 to 2003, Hafiz Ibrahim, member of parliament from Bhola served as the director of Rupali Bank Limited. He was re-elected to board in 2003 despite Bangladesh Bank seeking an explanation why a director had served more than 6 years in a row at the bank against its rules. Rupali Bank was of the opinion as a state owned Bank that rule did not apply to them. Bangladesh Bank removed him in 2005. Syed Muhammad Yunus, a tube well businessman, admitted to the Anti Corruption Commission that he embezzled 240 million taka from the bank with the help of Ibrahim.

Rupali Bank signed an agreement with Arif Habib Securities Limited to explore the option of starting a joint venture in Pakistan in 2004. The bank's branch in Pakistan became a joint venture with Arif Habib Securities Limited in 2005. It received the Bangladesh Best IT Use Award sponsored by Dutch-Bangla Bank Limited and awarded by Bangladesh Association of Software and Information Services. Altaf Hossain Choudhury, Minister of Commerce had handed over the award to the bank.

In June 2008, Bangladesh Bank refused to handle the privatization of Rupali Bank due to the large size of the Bank. A Saudi-backed group had expressed interest in taking over the bank in 2006. More than 20 companies had expressed interest in buying Rupali Bank including Abu Dhabi United Group, Alliance Bank Malaysia Berhad, AmBank, Habib Bank Limited, ICICI Bank, State Bank of India, Melewar Industrial Group Berhad, and United Bank Limited.

The bank established Rupali Investment Limited as a fully owned subsidiary in 2010.

In September 2015, a court in Dhaka ordered the bank to 600 thousand taka to a man runover and killed by a staff bus of the bank in 1996.

In 2016, Rupali Bank's top loan defaulter was AHZ Agro. 10 branches of the bank made a loss in 2016. Rupali Bank had distributed 137.71 billion taka of which 15.49 billion taka was bad loans, defaulted, and 10.19 billion taka in loans were written. It had a capital shortfall of 1.45 billion taka.

In November 2017, Bangladesh Industrial Finance Company could not return 317.3 million taka to Rupali Bank due to fund shortages. it became a shareholder of Padma Bank after the government used Rupali Bank and three other stated owned banks to injects funds into Padma Bank.

The recruitment exam of the three state owned banks, Rupali, Sonali Bank Limited, and Janata Bank Limited were stayed by a High Court bench composed of Justices Moyeenul Islam Chowdhury and Justice J. B. M. Hassan in January 2018.

In January 2019, Justices Md Nazrul Islam Takukder and K. M. Hafizul Alam of the High Court Division summoned S. M. Atiqur Rahman, general manager, Mohammad Ali, deputy general manager, and Md Abdus Samad Sarkar, principal officer of the bank after their names were exempted from a 150 million taka corruption case. The issued the order on an appeal filed by AHM Bahauddin, managing director of Everest Holding and Technologies Limited, who had been sentenced life imprisonment in the embezzlement case. In August, Md Obayed Ullah Al Masud was made managing director of Rupali Bank from Sonali Bank and Rupali Bank managing director Md. Ataur Rahman Prodhan was made managing director of Sonali Bank. The Bank offered to reschedule a 11.68 billion taka loan to Mother Textile, a subsidiary of Euroasia Mattress, which defaulted in 1993. The Daily Star described the offer as "outrageous".

Rupali Bank gave loans to 11 companies, including Beacon Pharmaceuticals, Bashundhara Paper Mills, Mother Textile, violating rules of the bank.

In 2021, Agrani Bank, Rupali, Sonali Bank Limited, and Janata Bank Limited, all state owned banks, paid the highest bonus to their employees despite poor performance and against the recommendation of Bangladesh Bank. Dhaka Stock Exchange disclosed that Rupali Bank had insufficient capital to manage its risks in 2022. It was part of a syndicated 5.2 billion taka loan organized by Dhaka Bank Limited for Chandpur Power Generations Limited of Doreen Group. Anti Corruption Commission sued the former managing director of the bank, M Farid Uddin, and nine officials of the bank and HR Spinning Mills Limited for embezzling 1.48 billion taka from the bank. It was made a Critical Information Infrastructure by the government of Bangladesh under the Digital Security Act restricting access to information of the bank. It is one of banks financing the gold refinery venture of Bashundhara Group.

== Board of directors ==
Name	Position	Reference
Md. Nazrul Huda	Chairman	
Mohammad Delwar Hossain	Director	
Md. Shafiqul Islam Laskar	Director	
Md. Asraf Hossain	Director	
Mr. Md. Daud Miah ndc	Director	
Shoaeb Ahmed	Director	
Md. Fardous Alom	Director	
Md. Rafiqul Alam	Independent director	
Kazi Md. Wahidul Islam	Managing director	
S.M.Abdul Hakim	observer from Bangladesh Bank	

== Subsidies ==
- Rupali Bank Securities Limited
- Rupali Investment Limited
