= Luna Shamsuddoha =

Bangladeshi entrepreneur (1953–2021)

- লুনা সামসুদ্দোহা
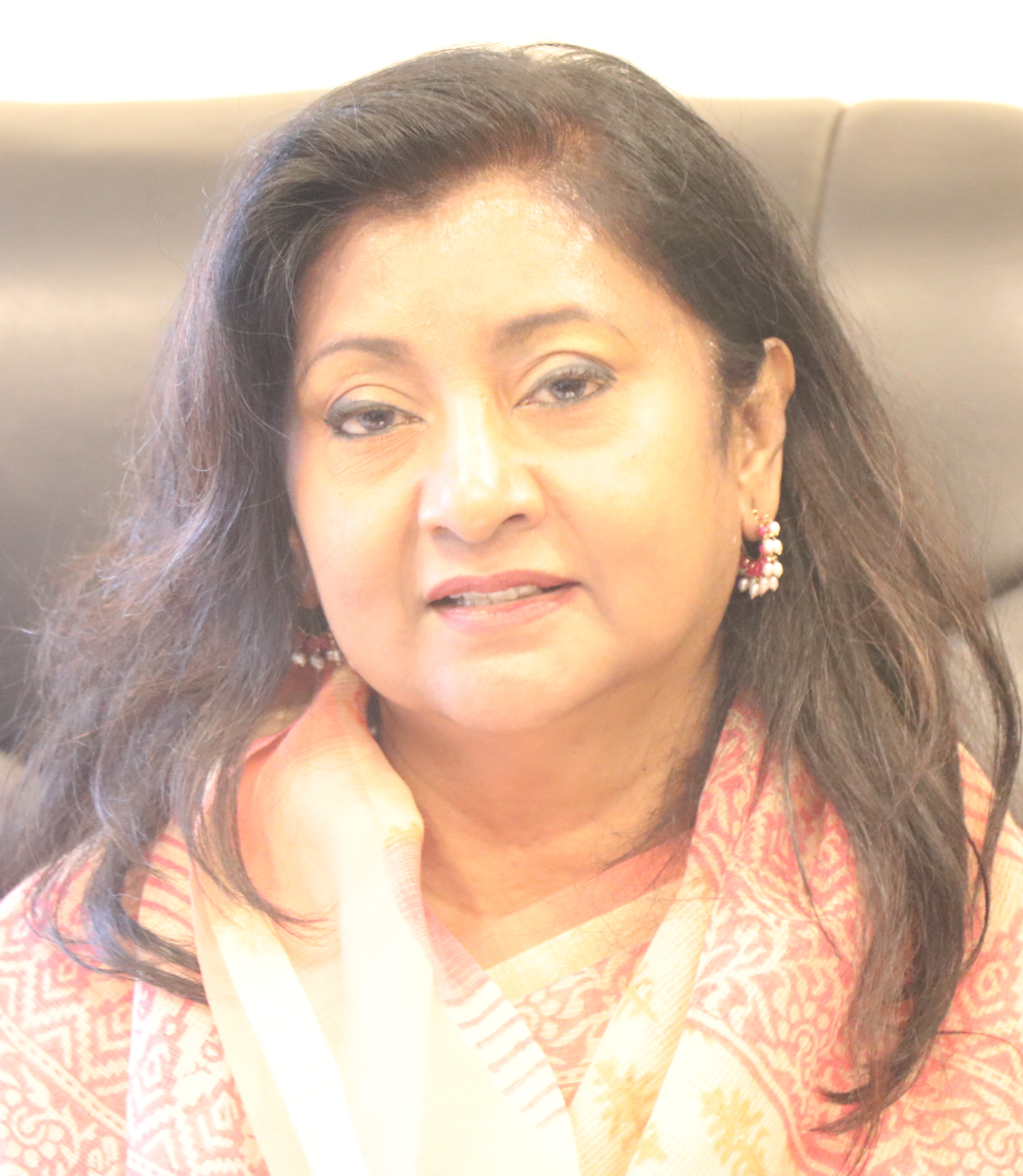
- Born: 4 October 1953; Dhaka, Bangladesh
- Died: 17 February 2021 (aged 67); Singapore
- Education: Master's degree in International Relations
- Alma mater: University of Dhaka
- Occupations: IT entrepreneur, business leader
- Organization: Bangladesh Women in IT (BWIT)
- Title: Chairman of Dohatec New Media and Janata Bank Limited
- Board member of: Independent University Bangladesh, Janata Bank Limited, SME Foundation
- Spouse: A. K. M. Shamsuddoha
- Children: 1
- Awards: Bangladesh Business Award (2017), Outstanding Woman in Business (2017), Anannya Top Ten Awards (2013)

Luna Shamsuddoha (4 October 1953 – 17 February 2021) was a Bangladeshi entrepreneur and business leader. She was the founder and chairman of the software firm Dohatec New Media, based in Dhaka, Bangladesh, which she established in 1992. She was the first woman to head any state-owned bank in Bangladesh and served as the chairman of state-owned Janata Bank Limited.

She was also the founder and president of Bangladesh Women in Technology (BWIT). In recognition of her contribution to the national economy, she received the Bangladesh Business Award in 2017 and was honored with the Anannya Top Ten Awards for her work in the local software industry as a woman entrepreneur.

Shamsuddoha served as a board member of the SME Foundation and Independent University Bangladesh (IUB), and as a director of state-owned Agrani Bank Limited and Janata Bank Limited. She was featured at global forums on technology, e-governance, and women's economic participation and empowerment. She was a member of the Council of Global Thought Leaders on Inclusive Growth, Switzerland.

== Early life and education ==
Shamsuddoha was born on 4 October 1953 in Dhaka to Lutfar Rahman and Hasina Rahman. She obtained her Secondary School Certificate (SSC) from Viqarunnisa Noon School and College and her Higher Secondary School Certificate (HSC) from Holy Cross College. She earned a master's degree in international relations from the University of Dhaka.

== Career ==
Shamsuddoha began her professional career as a consultant in 1978. In 1985, she entered business as the managing partner of The Executive Center. Prior to this, she worked as an English language teacher at the British Council Language Resource Center and as a lecturer in English at the Institute of Modern Languages, University of Dhaka.

She founded Dohatec New Media in 1992 and worked with the company until her death. Dohatec is an independent software vendor and system integrator that provides software solutions to institutions, government agencies, and corporations in North America, Europe, and Bangladesh. The company's key clients include the World Bank, World Health Organization, the US Postal Service, the Government of Bangladesh, and the Bangladesh Army. Dohatec also functions as a certifying authority and issues digital certificates, including identification certificates and SSL certificates.

Shamsuddoha was a panelist in two sessions of the UN 59th Commission on the Status of Women and served as a moderator of an online discussion for UN Women. She also participated in the UN ITC Trailblazers Summit: Transformations in Sourcing from Women, held in São Paulo, Brazil, in 2015, which focused on the inclusion of women in public procurement.

== Personal life ==
Luna Shamsuddoha was married to A. K. M. Shamsuddoha, a businessman. The couple had one daughter.

== Awards ==
- Bangladesh Business Award, 2017
- Outstanding Woman in Business, 2017
- Honorary Special Recognition Award by Global Women Inventors & Innovators Network (GWIIN), 2013
- Anannya Top Ten Awards (2013)

== Death ==
Shamsuddoha died on 17 February 2021 while undergoing cancer treatment at a hospital in Singapore, at the age of 67.
