= Khatunganj =

Khatunganj খাতুনগঞ্জ
- Bazaar
- Nickname: Wall Street of the East
- Location in Chittagong Division, Bangladesh
- Coordinates: 22.3386522°N 91.8427082°E
- Country: Bangladesh
- City: Chittagong
- Ward: Andarkilla
- Establishment: 1850s
- Named for: Khatun Bibi

Khatunganj is an import-dependent wholesale market in Chittagong, Bangladesh. Retail traders from different parts of the country buy products from this market. It is also known as the "Wall Street of the East".

== Location ==
It is situated in Chittagong, Bangladesh. On the three sides of the market, Chaktai, Rajakhali and Badarshah canals are flowing, whose source is the Karnaphuli River.

== History ==
During the Delhi Sultanate, a wholesale business hub was set up in Shulkabhar and Chawkbazar in Chittagong in the 13th century. Basically, the market was set up in those areas for the purpose of wholesale business. Later, the wholesale market expanded to Khatunganj which increase the size of the market. Since the area is connected to the Karnaphuli River through the canals in the area and the area is located very close to the river, the traders later moved the market to this specific area for wholesale business. In the 1850s, Sheikh Mohammad Hamidullah Khan established a market there. A land owned by his wife Khatun Bibi was located next to the market. Later, shops were established on Khatun Bibi's land and the entire market was named after her. After 1875, business activities in Khatunganj began to grow greatly. After the partition of India in 1947, Chittagong came under the control of Pakistan and the market came under the control of Muhajirs. At that time, Muhajir traders imported goods in the market and Bengali retailers bought and sold those goods all over East Pakistan. After the independence of Bangladesh in 1971, Bengali traders got the control of the market. In the 1980s, the market became import-dependent. Then import of crude edible oil started in the market. In 2017, floods caused by Cyclone Mora caused a loss of at least ৳30 billion to market's traders. During the complete shutdown program in 2024 Bangladesh quota reform movement resulted in the market being stagnated. Later, as a result of the non-cooperation movement and the resignation of Sheikh Hasina, the security crisis arising from the attack on the policemen, the lack of police involvement in security and the maximum limit of ৳20 million for withdrawing money from banks issued by the Yunus interim government caused instability in the market activities.

== Market ==
The market with 1,200 shops is a trade center for retailers across the country. Traders can purchase products in the rest without making a written contract here. As of 2022, the total number of outlets in the market stands at 5,000. In the fiscal year 2002–2003, 62% of the total amount of rice, pulses, wheat, soya bean oil, palm oil and sugar imported was imported by traders from Chittagong which were sold in Khatunganj. That share fell to 22 percent in the 2021–2022 fiscal year. However, the volume of transactions in the market has also increased during the twenty years.

== Issues ==
The number of street in the densely populated area is less than the need. Besides, the use of the river is being disrupted due to illegal filling of the canals here. Many times the businessmen of the market are deceived by getting fake bank checks while selling products. According to the research paper published in 2021 by the National Resilience Program and of the government of Bangladesh and the United Nations Development Programme, the market has suffered a loss of ৳251.7 billion due to the waterlogging problem in the city. Business activities are conducted in the market only through trust, so trading is conducted here without specific rules. The banks of Chittagong used to give loans to the traders of the market only on trust without collateral. As a result, the market tends to decline due to the increase in defaulted loans and the fraud incidences.

== Legacy ==
This market is called the "Wall Street of the East". Many businessmen have become successful entrepreneurs by trade in the market. On 27 May 2011, the Khatunganj Trade and Industries Association organized a festival on the occasion of the centenary of the market.
