= BASIC Bank =

Bank in Bangladesh

BASIC Bank PLC.
- Type: State owned
- Industry: Banking
- Founded: Dhaka, Bangladesh
- Headquarters: Dhaka, Bangladesh
- Key people: Mr. Helal Ahmed Chowdhury (17 Nov, 2024-Cont.) (Chairman)
- Products: Banking services Consumer Banking; Corporate Banking; Investment Banking
- Net income: ▲50 million USD
- Total assets: 1 billion USD
- Website: www.basicbanklimited.com

BASIC Bank PLC. (founded as Bangladesh Small Industries and Commerce Bank) is a state owned bank in Bangladesh. It was founded on 2 August 1988. The bank was founded to finance small enterprises.

== History ==
BASIC Bank Limited was established on 2 August 1988 began operations from 21 January 1989. It was owned by BCC Foundation, which owned 70 percent of the shares, and the government of Bangladesh, which owned the remaining 30 percent of the shares. On 4 June 1992, BCCI, which owned BCC Foundation, closed and the government of Bangladesh took over 100 percent ownership.

In December 2003, Basic Bank signed an agreement with International Leasing and Financial Services Limited to provide loans.

Basic Bank donated to the Chief Adviser's Relief and Welfare Fund in 2007.

In 2009, Dewan Zakir Hossain, Secretary at the Ministry of Information, was appointed chairman of BASIC Bank Limited.

Sheikh Abdul Hye Bacchu resigned as chairman of the bank following 4.5 billion taka in defaulted loans on 5 July 2014.

Basic Bank fired its managing director, Kazi Faqurul Islam, in 2015 over financial irregularities at the bank following an investigation by Bangladesh Bank.

BASIC Bank PLC. is one of seven state owned banks in Bangladesh. In 2016 the finance minister in a statement described the state of the bank as weak due to graft by top officials of the bank and would require some time for improvement. Sonali Bank UK Ltd and other international banks had censured Basic bank over irregularities. Since 2012 Basic bank had been frozen out of international transactions as a result of the irregularities. In October 2016, A Monayem Khan, Deputy managing director of the bank was fired.

Two deputy managing directors, Fazlu Sobhan and Mohammad Selim, and former Deputy General Manager Shiper Ahmed were sent to prison for embezzlement. The Anti Corruption Commission had filed 56 cases against 156 people in 2015 over the embezzlement of 20 billion taka. Bangladesh bank estimated 45 billion had been swindled from the bank during the six years the time Sheikh Abdul Hye Bachhu served as the chairman of the bank. Among the accused was the former managing director Kazi Fakhrul Islam.

The parliamentary standing committee on finance ministry and Bangladesh Supreme Court criticised the Anti Corruption Commission for failure to name Sheikh Abdul Hye Bachhu in its investigation report of the bank and failure to find his involvement. There was allegations that Anti Corruption Commission did not file cases against former chairman Sheikh Abdul Hye Bacchu because he is "Jatiya Party leader" and had "connections at high positions". Sheikh Abdul Hye Bacchu has denied the allegations. Following a report by Bangladesh Bank to the Anti Corruption Commission, The Daily Star described BASIC bank as being "blatantly looted".

Mahjabeen Morshed, member of parliament of Jatiya Party, was sued by the Anti Corruption Commission for embezzling 2.75 billion taka from the bank.

In December 2019, employees of BASIC bank confined the directors of the bank demanding the bank scrap changes to the wage structure. The bank had recently cut the salaries of its employees citing issues with generating revenue.

The Minister of Finance, AHM Mustafa Kamal, considered merging BASIC Bank Limited with Bangladesh Development Bank Limited in 2021.

== Board of directors (last updated on 11/12/2025) ==
| Name | Designation | Reference |
|---|---|---|
| Mr. Helal Ahmed Chowdhury | Chairman | |
| Mr. Sheikh Farid | Director | |
| Mr. Md. Matiur Rahman, FCA, FCMA | Director | |
| Mr. Md. Abdul Ahad | Director | |
| Dr. Abu Saleh Mostafa Kamal | Director | |
| Mr. Munshi Abdul Ahad | Director | |
| Mr. S.M. Iqbal Hossain | Director | |
| Mr. Md. Quamruzzaman Khan | Managing Director & CEO | |
