= Standard Islami Bank =

Shariah-based bank in Bangladesh

Standard Islami Bank PLC
- Type: Private commercial bank
- Traded as: DSE: STANDBANKL; CSE: STANDBANKL
- Industry: Financial services Banking
- Founded: Dhaka, Bangladesh
- Headquarters: Dhaka, Bangladesh
- Key people: Ferozur Rahman (Chairman); Gulzar Ahmed (Vice Chairman); Kazi Akram Uddin Ahmed (Director)
- Products: Banking services Consumer Banking; Corporate Banking; Investment Banking
- Net income: ▼
- Website: www.standardbankbd.com

Standard Islami Bank PLC previously known as Standard Bank PLC is a private commercial bank in Bangladesh. Mr. Ferozur Rahman is the chairman of the bank and Gulzar Ahmed is the vice-chairman of the bank.

== History ==
The bank was founded on 3 June 1999, with an approved capital of 750 million taka. Kazi Akram Uddin Ahmed was the founding chairman of the bank.

In July 2004, Standard Bank provided 100 million BDT credit to International Leasing and Financial Services Limited.

The Bank decided provide a 12 per cent dividend in 2007 at the 9th annual general meeting at the BDR Darbar Hall presided by chairman Kazi Akramuddin Ahmed.

Mamun-Ur-Rashid was appointed managing director of the bank in October 2016.

The Anti-Corruption Commission filed a case against former managing director of Standard Bank Limited, Mamun Ur Rashid, and seven other officials of Sachetan Sahajjo Songstha and Standard Bank Limited for misappropriating 40 million BDT from the Bank in February 2021. Senior Special Judge Md Asaduzzaman of the Dhaka Metropolitan Court sent former managing director of Standard Bank Limited, Mamun Ur Rashid, to jail in a case over the embezzlement of 40 million BDT from the bank in October 2022.

Standard Bank Limited decided to switch to Sharia complaint banking from traditional banking; it remained close for four days in December 2020 to make the transition.

Standard Bank comes to sport 2020 when its layoff employees during the pandemic.

In 2021, a group of Standard Bank employees filed a complaint with the Bangladesh Bank alleging that the bank was violating labor laws. The complaint alleged that Standard Bank was forcing employees to work overtime without pay and that it was discriminating against pregnant women and women with young children. The Bangladesh Bank is still investigating the complaint.

In 2022, a group of Standard Bank employees staged a protest against the bank's management. The protesters alleged that the bank was failing to pay overtime wages to employees and that it was providing inadequate training and support to employees. The protest was eventually resolved, but it highlighted the concerns that some employees have about the way they are treated at Standard Bank.

In January 2023, Standard Bank Limited donated 40 million takas to the relief fund of Prime Minister Sheikh Hasina. Kazi Khurram Ahmed, son of the Kazi Akram Uddin Ahmed, chairman of Standard Bank Limited, was elected vice-chairman of the bank.

In February 2026, Standard Bank PLC rebranded as ‘Standard Islami Bank PLC’.

== Financial services ==
- Islami Banking
- Retails Banking
- Card Service (Credit & Debit)
- Foreign Exchange & Related Services
- Probashi Banking
- Agent Banking
- SME Banking
