= Meghna Bank =

Bank headquartered in Gulshan, Dhaka, Bangladesh

Meghna Bank PLC.
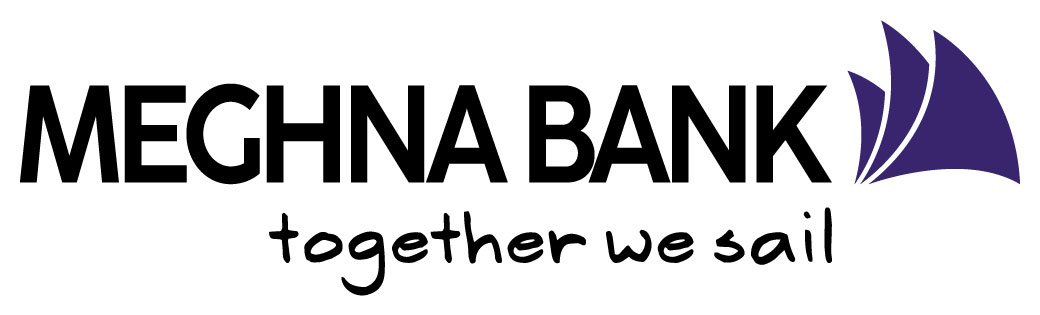
- Together We Sail
- Type: Commercial Bank
- Industry: Financial services Banking
- Founded: 21 April 2013
- Headquarters: Suvastu Imam Square (level 3 & 6) | 65, Gulshan Avenue (Gulshan-1); Dhaka-1212
- Number of locations: 51
- Area served: Bangladesh
- Key people: H. N. Ashequr Rahman (Chairman); Kazi Ahsan Khalil (Managing Director & CEO)
- Products: Banking services, ATM services Consumer Banking; Corporate Banking Investment Banking
- Services: Conventional, Islamic Banking
- Net income: ▲
- Number of employees: 1000+ (2024)
- Website: https://www.meghnabank.com.bd

Meghna Bank PLC. is a fourth-generation bank headquartered in Gulshan, Dhaka, Bangladesh. Established on May 9, 2013, by entrepreneur and politician H. N. Ashequr Rahman, the bank has been in operation for a decade.

== History ==
Meghna Bank PLC - Gulshan 1

Meghna Bank Ltd. (MGBL) is a scheduled commercial bank established as a public limited company in Bangladesh in March 2013. It officially commenced banking operations on May 9, 2013, holding a license from Bangladesh Bank.

The bank currently operates 51 branches, 10 Islamic banking windows, 18 agents, and 18 own ATM booths strategically located across the country, with free access to 12,000 ATM booths nationwide.

In February 2020, Meghna Bank obtained permission to operate an Islamic Banking Unit, and in October 2020, it established an Off-shore Banking Unit (OBU) for foreign currency services. The bank also has subsidiary investments in Meghna Bank Securities Limited.

== Founder ==
H. N. Ashequr Rahman is a prominent figure in Bangladeshi business, politics, and academia. Born on December 11, 1941, he pursued his academic journey at Rajshahi University. Later in 1972, he played a vital role as the Administrator of Dhaka Municipality. Beyond his career, Mr. Rahman is a successful businessman, co-founded East West University and is the founder and chairman of Meghna Bank Limited Mr. Rahman has had a noteworthy political career, serving in multiple parliamentary sessions, including as state minister for environment and forests, and as treasurer of the Awami League since 1993.

== Leadership ==
Name	Role
H.N. Ashequr Rahman	Chairman of the Board of Directors
Imrana Zaman Chowdhury	Vice Chairperson of the Board of Directors
Tanveer Ahmed	Director
Mohammed Mamun Salam	Director & Chairman, Executive Committee
Nuran Fatema	Director
Lion Jahangir Alam Manik	Director
Uzma Chowdhury	Director
Ishmam Raidah Rahman	Director
Rehana Ashequr Rahman	Director & Chairperson, Risk Management Committee
S M Rezaur Rahman	Director & Chairman, Audit Committee
Tarana Ahmed	Director
Dr. Zahara Rasul	Director
Md. Mahamudul Alam	Director
Aresha Manami Shafiq	Director
Javed Kaiser Ally	Director
Abu Haydar Chowdhury	Director
Dr. Syed Ferhat Anwar	Independent Director
Md. Ahsan Ullah	Independent Director
Kazi Ahsan Khalil	MD & CEO

Kazi Ahsan Khalil was appointed managing director and chief executive officer of Meghna Bank PLC in April 2024.

== Products ==
The bank provides a wide range of services catering to different industries, such as RMG and textiles, food and agrobusiness, infrastructure and energy, technology financing, and more. Deposits, loans, and credit card services for different consumer segments are classified according to different needs and preferences.

Distribution Network: 51 Branches, 24/7 Internet Banking, and access to more than 12,000 ATM booths.

== Expansion ==
With 51 branches spread across Bangladesh, including key locations in Dhaka, Meghna Bank is also currently expanding its branches/, sub-branches/, gent banking outlets/Mobile Financial Service Meghna Pay's cash-in, cash and out points.

== See also ==
List of banks in Bangladesh
