= Bangladesh Development Bank =

Government-owned bank

Bangladesh Development Bank PLC.
- Type: State-owned bank, Public Limited Company
- Industry: Development Bank; Bank; Capital Markets and allied industries
- Founded: Dhaka, 16 November 2009
- Number of locations: 51
- Key people: Ahmed Ismat (Chairman); Md Jashim Uddin(MD & CEO)
- Products: Retail banking, private banking, corporate banking, deposits, mortgage loan, savings scheme, Sanchay Scheme, trade and retail forex
- Total assets: ৳64.57 billion (US$530 million)
- Number of employees: About 651
- Parent: Government of Bangladesh (100%)
- Subsidiaries: BDBL Securities Limited (BSL); BDBL Investment Services Limited (BISL)
- Website: bdbl.com.bd

Bangladesh Development Bank PLC. (Bengali: বাংলাদেশ ডেভেলপমেন্ট ব্যাংক পিএলসি.) is a state-owned commercial bank in Bangladesh. The Bangladesh Development Bank Limited (BDBL), a public limited company, was formally established on January 3, 2010. It extends financial assistance for setting up industries and provides commercial banking services to its customers through its branch network in Bangladesh.

== Formation of Bangladesh Development Bank PLC ==
On October 31^{st} 1972, the Bangladesh Shilpa Rin Sangstha (BSRS) and Bangladesh Shilpa Bank (BSB) were established through the Bangladesh President's Order no.'s 128 and 129 respectively, and tasked with supporting the country's industrial growth by providing loans and equity to upcoming industrial projects.

On November 16^{th}, by discretion of the Bangladesh government, the Bangladesh Development Bank Limited (BDBL) was incorporated as a Public Limited Company under the Companies Act of 1994 through the merger of the Bangladesh Shilpa Bank (BSB), and the Bangladesh Shilpa Rin Sangstha (BSRS).

In order to carry on the business of BDBL, Bangladesh Bank issued a banking license for BDBL on November 19^{th} 2009. Following this, two Vendors' Agreements were signed between the Government of the People's Republic of Bangladesh and the BDBL on December 31^{st} of that year to acquire and merge all of the BSB and BSRB's assets, benefits, rights, powers, authorities, privileges, liabilities, borrowings and obligations and to carry on with their duties.

BDBL began its services as a Public Limited Company on January 3, 2010. It extends financial assistance to industrial startups and provides a range of commercial banking services to its customers through its branch network in Bangladesh.

== Services ==
The bank currently provides a diverse range of services, which are as follows:

1. Commercial Banking
2. Foreign Trade

Within foreign trade, BDBL also offers:

1. Export Cash Credit and Packing Credits
2. Purchase of Documentary Bills (local and foreign)
3. Payment against Bill Dues
4. Import Trade Loans, Loans against Trust Receipts
5. Foreign Exchange Business
6. Local Letters of Credit
7. Import local Letters of Credit / Export Bill Collection / Back to Back Letters of Credit
8. Foreign Remittance Services

BDBL also serves as a major development partner to both the public and private financial sectors by providing long, medium and short-term loans. Additionally, it also offers services such as industrial loans, equity capital supply programs, capital market participation, loan recovery incentives, rehabilitation programs and capital mobilization for loan investments.

BDBL also supports Public-Private Partnership projects for sectors such as power, energy and telecommunications, as well as within government projects such as the development of ports and transport and renewable energy infrastructure. It also has financing options for SMEs, loans for agro-based entrepreneurs and green banking initiatives.

== Branches ==
BDBL currently has 51 banking branches across the country. The bank provides all types of commercial banking services to its customers through its 51 branch network within the country. The latest is the 51st branch in Chitalmari Branch, Bagerhat, which was inaugurated on 16 January 2025. Bangladesh Development Bank PLC (BDBL) also operates its banking operations online through its mobile app and internet banking services.

== Technological Banking ==
Since July 2015, the Bangladesh Development Bank Limited (BDBL) has implemented the Core Banking System (CBS) to centralize banking transactions and overall operations. This system enables seamless transactions from any BDBL branch through the core banking software. Additionally, two types of inter-bank transactions are facilitated:

1. Bangladesh Automated Check Clearing House (BACH): This system handles the clearing and settlement of inter-bank checks.

2. Bangladesh Electronic Fund Transfer Network (BEFTN): Also known as the 'Electronic Fund Transfer System,' this network enables nationwide inter-bank debit and credit transactions. These transactions are processed easily, quickly, and free of charge from any bank branch.

BDBL is also the first government bank to connect with the National Payment Switch Bangladesh (NPSB), enabling users to transfer funds instantly and conveniently.

== Achievements ==
In 2014, BDBL won two awards (from ICAB and ICMAB in recognition of corporate governance) for presenting the best annual report. Bangladesh Development Bank Limited (BDBL) was also ranked 2nd in the government bank category.

== Board of directors ==
Name	Designation	Reference
Ahmed Ismat	Chairman	
K.M. Tariqul Islam	Director	
Md. Abdul Mojid	Director	
Md. Shab Alam	Director	
Sultan Mahmud Bin Zulfiqar	Director	
Mahbubun Nahar	Director	
Md. Chaynul Haque	Director	
Md. Jashim Uddin	Managing Director & CEO	

== See also ==
- List of national development banks
- List of banks in Bangladesh
