= GSP Finance Company (Bangladesh) Limited =

- Formation: 1995
- Headquarters: Dhaka, Bangladesh
- Region served: Bangladesh
- Official language: Bengali
- Website: gspfinance.com

GSP Finance Company (Bangladesh) Limited is a major non-bank financial institution in Bangladesh. Feroz U. Haider is the chairman, Saber Hossain Chowdhury, and A. T. M. Shamsul Huda are the vice chairmen.

== History ==
GSP Finance Company (Bangladesh) Limited was established on 29 October 1995 and started operations from 17 April 1996. It is a member of the Bangladesh Merchant Bankers Association.

The 10th annual general meeting of the company was held in April 2005 under chairman Sutham Chansrichawla and approved a 22.5 per cent dividend.

Bangladesh Bank asked GSP Finance Company (Bangladesh) Limited to go for initial public offering August 2007.

BRAC Bank expressed an interest to buy the majority share in GSP Finance after signing a MoU but the deal fell through in February 2009.

GSP Finance Company (Bangladesh) Limited were working to be listed on the Dhaka Stock Exchange by the end of 2010.

In November 2018, earnings per share of GSP Finance declined. In 2019, it declared a 10.5 per cent dividend of which 6 per cent was cash and 4.5 per cent was shares.

In February 2020, the company had more than 10 per cent defaulted loans and a low capital adequacy ratio which resulted in Bangladesh Bank ordering it to not pay dividends.

In September 2021, the share prices of the company declined on the Stock Exchange. The shares rose again in December. It declared an 11 per cent dividend with 5.5 cash dividend and 5.5 stock dividend.

The company's profit decreased in the first quarter of the 2022 fiscal year. The shares of the company rose in January. The company was one of the most traded stocks in May with only three other companies with more trades. In April, Bangladesh Bank denied permission to Islamic Finance and Investment Limited to hire the managing director of GSP Finance, Mohammad Imdadul Islam, as its managing director due to some irregularities in the Islam's record at GSP Finance. April–June saw a 70 per cent decrease in the profit of the company. The company share prices on the stock market rose significantly in June but saw declines near the end of the month. It was the most traded stock in June. Its profits increased slightly near the end of the year and the board of directors recommended a 2.5 cash dividend and 7.5 per cent stock dividend.

== Board of directors ==
- Feroz U. Haider (Chairman)
- Dr. A. T. M. Shamsul Huda (Director & Vice Chairman)
- Anwarul Bar Chowdhury (Independent Director)
- Faridul Hassan (Independent Director)
