= Infrastructure Development Company =

Infrastructure Development Company Limited (IDCOL)
- Formation: 1997
- Type: Financial institution
- Headquarters: UTC Building, 16th Floor, 8 Panthapath, Kawran Bazar
- Location: Dhaka, Bangladesh
- Official language: Bengali, English
- Key people: Shahriar Kader Siddiky (Chairman)
- Parent organization: Ministry of Finance, Government of Bangladesh
- Staff: 400+
- Website: www.idcol.org

Infrastructure Development Company Limited is a government owned specialised non-bank financial institution that finances renewable infrastructure projects in Bangladesh and is located in Dhaka, Bangladesh. In 2016, it was awarded the United Nations Momentum for Change Award.

== History ==
Infrastructure Development Company Limited was established on 14 May 1997 by the Government of Bangladesh. It also finances organizations who distribute solar panels in Bangladesh. The company was licensed by the Bangladesh Bank as a non-bank financial institution on 5 January 1998. Since its inception, it has played a major role in bridging the financing gap for developing medium to large-scale infrastructure and renewable energy projects in Bangladesh.

The company is managed by a nine-member independent Board of Directors comprising five senior government officials, three representatives from the private sector and a full-time executive director and chief executive officer. Secretary/Senior Secretary of Economic Relations Division under the Ministry of Finance is the ex-officio chairman of the company. It has a small and multi-skilled work force comprising financial and market analysts, lawyers, engineers, IT experts, accountants and environmental and social safeguard specialists.
