= National Credit and Commerce Bank =

Bangladeshi bank

NCC Bank PLC.
- Founded: 1985
- Headquarters: Dhaka, Bangladesh
- Key people: Md. Nurun Newaz (Chairman); M. Shamsul Arefin (Managing Director and CEO)
- Website: nccbank.com.bd

NCC Bank PLC. or National Credit and Commerce Bank PLC. is a Bangladeshi private commercial bank. Mr. M. Shamsul Arefin is the present managing director and CEO of the bank.

== History ==
NCC Bank was founded in 1985 as an investment company in the name of NCL (National Credit Limited). It became a scheduled commercial bank after receiving permission from the central bank in 1993 and started with a paid up capital of Tk. 390 million.

In June 2008, Tofazzal Hossain was elected chairman of NCC Bank.

In September 2015, the Rapid Action Battalion arrested an employee of NCC Bank for embezzling 89.8 million BDT from remittance.

In August 2017, Mosleh Uddin Ahmed was appointed CEO and managing director of NCC Bank. Md Nurun Newaz Salim, chairman of Electro Mart Limited and Central Insurance Company Limited, was elected chairman of NCC Bank.

In May 2019, a Bangladesh Financial Intelligence Unit investigation found Mosleh Uddin Ahmed, managing director of NCC Bank, had abnormal bank deposits. The board of directors of the bank decided to have a meeting over the issue and sought an explanation from Ahmed. Three financial banks, Dutch Bangla Bank Limited, NCC Bank Limited, and Prime Bank, were victims of cyberattacks in May. Dutch Bangla Bank Limited lost three million USD to the hackers, while the other banks maintained that they did not lose any money. Md Nurun Newaz Salim was re-elected chairman of NCC Bank.

On 30 December 2020, Mohammad Mamdudur Rashid was appointed managing director of NCC Bank. On 5 September 2021, Md Abul Bashar was elected chairman of NCC Bank.

In August 2022, the bank approved issuance of a five billion BDT bond with the aim of meeting the Tier 2 capital requirements of Basel III.

In October 2024, Alhaj Md. Nurun Newaz was elected chairman of the bank.

== Board of directors ==
Name	Designation	Reference
Md. Nurun Newaz	Chairman	
Sohela Hossain	Director	
Abdus Salam	Director	
Amjadul Ferdous Chowdhury	Director	
S.M. Abu Mohsin	Director	
Tanzina Ali	Director	
Khairul Alam Chaklader	Director	
Md. Moinuddin	Director	
Mohammed Sazzad Un Newaz	Director	
Mr. M. Shamsul Arefin	CEO and Managing Director	
