= Bangladesh Industrial Finance Company Limited =

Non-bank financial institution

- Type: Public company
- Traded as: DSE: BIFC
- Founded: 1996; 30 years ago
- Headquarters: Dhaka, Bangladesh
- Area served: Bangladesh
- Key people: Moyeenul Islam Chowdhury (Chairman)
- Website: bifcol.com

Bangladesh Industrial Finance Company Limited is a major non-bank financial institution in Bangladesh.

In 2021 the company got into financial trouble due to embezzlement by its former chairman Abdul Mannan. The company had given large loans that were not performing to Sunman Group subsidiaries, owned by Abdul Mannan.

The company is listed on the Dhaka Stock Exchange. Bangladesh Industrial Finance Company Limited was one of four financial institutions targeted in embezzlement by Proshanta Kumar Halder; the others were People's Leasing and Financial Service Limited, FAS Finance and Investment Limited, and Reliance Finance Limited.

== History ==
Bangladesh Industrial Finance Company Limited was established on 10 August 1996. It is located in Police Plaza Concord, Gulshan.

Bangladesh Industrial Finance Company Limited was listed on the Dhaka Stock Exchange in 2006.

In 2014, Bangladesh Industrial Finance Company Limited was declared a Z category stock on the Dhaka Stock Exchange.

Bangladesh Bank appointed an observer in the board of directors of Bangladesh Industrial Finance Company Limited in 2015.

From December 2012 to December 2016, defaulted loans at Bangladesh Industrial Finance Company Limited jumped from 12 percent to 90 percent. In 2012 the company had 840 million loan and 2016 it was 7.8 billion taka.

In November 2017, Bangladesh Industrial Finance Company Limited was on the verge of collapse. Its chairman Major (retired) Abdul Mannan, who is also the chairman of Sunman Group, embezzled money from the institution. The chairman was a politician of Bangladesh Nationalist Party. According to Bangladesh Bank, Manan had taken 8.6 billion taka from Bangladesh Industrial Finance Company Limited. Manan blamed a conspiracy by "Chittagong-based conglomerate". The percentage of loans defaulted at the Bangladesh Industrial Finance Company Limited stood at 96 percent in December 2017 with the company on the verge of liquidation. Proshanta Kumar Halder had also embezzled five billion taka from Bangladesh Industrial Finance Company Limited.

On 9 August 2019, Anti-Corruption Commission sued the former Chairman of Bangladesh Industrial Finance Company Limited, Abdul Mannan, for embezzlement.

The Bangladesh High Court appointed former justice Moyeenul Islam Chowdhury as the chairman of the board and four independent board members.

Bangladesh Industrial Finance Company Limited shares on the Dhaka Stock Exchange rose sharply despite being in the negative financially in 2022. It suffered its sixth year of straight loses in 2022. BASIC Bank Limited defaulted on its loan from Bangladesh Industrial Finance Company Limited.
