= AB Bank =

Private bank in Bangladesh

AB Bank Limited
- Native name: এবি ব্যাংক লিমিটেড
- Formerly: Arab Bangladesh Bank Limited
- Type: Public Limited Company
- Traded as: DSE: ABBANK
- Industry: Banking
- Founded: April 12, 1982; 44 years ago in Dhaka, Bangladesh
- Headquarters: The Skymark, 18 Gulshan Avenue, Gulshan 1, Dhaka 1212, Bangladesh
- Number of locations: 104
- Area served: Bangladesh, Myanmar, Hong Kong, Mumbai, India
- Key people: Syed Mizanur Rahman (Managing Director & CEO); Kaiser A. Chowdhury (Chairman)
- Products: Consumer Banking; Corporate Banking; Retail Banking; SME Banking; Islamic Banking; Credit Cards
- Services: Local & Foreign Cashless Transactions, Debit & Credit Cards, Retail Banking, Loan & Deposits
- Number of employees: 2,300+
- Subsidiaries: Local AB Securities Limited AB Investment Limited Cashlink Bangladesh Limited Foreign AB International Finance Limited
- Website: abbl.com

AB Bank (formerly Arab Bangladesh Bank) is a leading private sector bank in Bangladesh. AB Bank Limited was incorporated on 31 December 1981 and its the first commercial private bank in Bangladesh.

== History ==
AB Bank was established on 31 December 1981. This was the first joint venture private bank in Bangladesh. On 14 November 2007 Bangladesh bank approved the name change to AB Bank from Arab Bangladesh Bank. A former deputy managing director was charged with embezzling 3.25 billion taka from the bank.

In February 2008, AB Bank was fined 100 million taka for violating securities law with excessive marginal loans. The majority of these loans from the merchant banking wing of AB Bank went to bank employees and their relatives.

In 2014 AB bank completed its acquisition of Cashlink Bangladesh Limited. A former vice president and his wife were sentenced to life in prison for embezzlement of 67.4 million taka from the bank in 2016. According to an investigation by Bangladesh Bank, AB Bank had laundered 1.65 billion taka to United Arab Emirates. The investigation identified Cheng Bao General Trading LLC and Pinnacle Global Fund Pte Limited for being involved in laundering the money. According to the Anti-Corruption Commission, M Morshed Khan, founder of the bank, unduly favored loans to Citycell which was also owned by him.

On 14 June 2022, Justices Md Nazrul Islam Talukder and Kazi Md Ejarul Haque Akondo the High Court Division criticized the Anti-Corruption Commission and Bangladesh Police for not being able to arrest the 15 accused in the 1.76 billion taka embezzlement case.
