= FAS Finance and Investment Limited =

Non-bank financial institution

FAS Finance and Investment Limited FFIL
- Company type: Public
- Traded as: DSE: FASFIN
- Industry: Financial services
- Founded: 1997; 29 years ago
- Headquarters: Dhaka, Bangladesh
- Key people: Mohammed Nurul Amin (Chairman), A. F. Shabbir Ahmad (Managing Director)
- Website: www.fasbd.com

FAS Finance and Investment Limited is a major non-bank financial institution in Bangladesh providing lease financing and investment services.

In 2020, it was one of the financial institutions targeted by Prashanta Kumar Halder, nicknamed the Sultan of Swindle by The Daily Star, who had stolen 102 billion taka from FAS Finance and Investment Limited, People's Leasing and Financial Services Limited, International Leasing and Financial Services Limited, Reliance Finance Limited, and NRB Global Bank Limited.

It is listed on the Dhaka Stock Exchange.

== History ==
FAS Finance and Investment Limited was established on 4 March 1997 and received license to operate as a merchant bank 22 January 1998.

FAS Finance and Investment Limited became a public limited company on 18 August 2001.

On 14 February 2007, FAS Finance and Investment Limited open its branch in Chittagong and in Narsingdi in July. The institution held an IPO in 2007.

FAS Finance and Investment Limited opened a branch in Sylhet on 9 July 2008.

The company was initially run by Abdul Matlub Ahmad, chairman of Nitol Niloy Group, and his family members. It was financially sound until they sold their stakes in 2014. Prashanta Kumar Halder and his associates took control in 2014 and appointed Md Rassel Shahriar managing director of FAS Finance and Investment Limited. Md Rassel Shahriar and Prashanta Kumar Halder worked together in the same bank in 2007. Ujjal Kumar Nandi, another associate of Halder, was appointed director of FAS Finance and Investment Limited.

On 28 April 2017, Md Siddiqur Rahman was appointed managing director of FAS Finance and Investment Limited. He served as a director of Nitol Insurance Company Limited, a concern of Nitol Niloy Group, and Clewiston Foods & Accommodation Limited, a concern of Clewiston Group.

Pritish Kumar Sarker became the managing director of FAS Finance and Investment Limited in January 2018. The company was profitable till 2018.

The Bangladesh Securities and Exchange Commission on 31 May 2021 had formed a new board of directors for FAS Finance and Investment Limited. On 7 June 2021, Bangladesh Bank stopped Pritish Kumar Sarker, managing director of FAS Finance and Investment Limited, from travelling to the United States. The ban was confirmed by immigration unit of the Bangladesh Police. Prashanta Kumar Halder had embezzled 13 billion taka from FAS Finance and Investment Limited through fraudulent loans. Halder had scammed three other financial institutions leaving to unable to pay back loans taken from various banks in Bangladesh. He was able to do so by getting his relatives appointed as directors in those institutions. Officers at FAS Finance and Investment Limited who refused to help Halder with the fraud were punished by the company. Halder had left the financial institution financially crippled. Halder was arrested in India which raised the prices of the stocks of FAS Finance and Investment Limited.

On 16 February 2022, Md Rassel Shahriar, former managing director of FAS Finance and Investment Limited was detained by the Anti-Corruption Commission. Central Depository Bangladesh Limited was ordered to seize the stocks owned by Prashanta Kumar Halder.

== Subsidiary ==
- FAS Capital Management Limited received license to operate on 16 May 2012.
