= People's Leasing and Financial Services Limited =

Non-bank financial institution

People's Leasing and Financial Services Limited (PLFSL)
- Company type: Public
- Traded as: DSE: PLFSL
- Industry: Financial services
- Founded: 1996; 30 years ago
- Headquarters: Dhaka, Bangladesh
- Key people: Hasan Shaheed Ferdous (Chairman)
- Website: www.plfsbd.com

People's Leasing and Financial Services Limited is a major non-bank financial institution in Bangladesh providing leasing and investment services.

In 2020, Bangladeshi-Canadian businessman Proshanta Kumar Halder, known as the Sultan of Swindle, scammed 35 billion taka from the company.

== History ==
People's Leasing and Financial Services Limited was established on 12 August 1996 and received its license from Bangladesh Bank on 24 November 1997.

In 2010, the People's Leasing and Financial Services Limited received permission from Bangladesh Securities and Exchange Commission to issue shares on the stock exchange.

An investigation by Bangladesh Bank found financial irregularities took place from 2002 to 2014. It has found the chairman and four members of the board of directors had embezzled money from the institute through fraudulent loans. The Anti Corruption Commission arrested Khabir Uddin Miah, one of the directors, on those allegations. Chairman M. Moazzam Hossain was removed from the board of directors. The other director who faced allegations were Nargis Alamin, Humaira Alamin, and Arafin Shamsul Alamin.

The stock of the company did well on the Dhaka Stock Exchange in 2018 based on rumors.

The government of Bangladesh considered liquidating the People's Leasing and Financial Services Limited and Bangladesh Industrial Finance Company Limited in July 2019 due to its failure to pay back its creditors. Individual and Small Depositors' Council of the non-bank financial institution, a pressure group, demanded the government restructure the institute rather than liquidate it.

Justice Muhammad Khurshid Alam Sarkar of the High Court Division of the Bangladesh Supreme Court ordered the restructuring the financial institution to prevent its bankruptcy in 2021. He summoned 280 loan defaulters of the institution to appear before the court. The court appointed Kamal-Ul-Alam as chairman of the institute and Mohammad Jalaluddin as the managing director. It created a new board of directors for the institution. On 1 June, Kamal Ul Alam for health reasons and Hasan Shahed Ferdous was appointed as a replacement. In November 2021, the chairman of Bangladesh Securities and Exchange Commission, Shibli Rubayat Ul Islam, ordered an audit of the institute's activities from 2013 to 2021. Peoples Leasing and Financial Services Limited in November 2021 without any notice started returning the money of depositors aged over 75.

Proshanta Kumar Halder, managing director of Reliance Finance, was able to appoint his relatives in senior management positions of People's Leasing and Financial Services Limited and embezzled more than 35 billion taka from the institute. He was aided by the daughter of Khabir Uddin Ahmed, a director of People's Leasing and Financial Services Limited. The two sisters, Sharmin Ahmed and Tania Ahmed, had been living in Canada and were arrested by the Rapid Action Battalion on a visit to Bangladesh. The High Court ordered 11 of his associates to surrender their passports to the court. He had swindled 102 billion taka in total from International Leasing and Financial Services Limited, People's Leasing and Financial Services Limited, Reliance Finance Limited, FAS Finance and Investment Limited, and NRB Global Bank.

In August 2022, People's Leasing and Financial Services Limited announced its intention to return the money of 582 small investors. Bangladesh Bank denied its request to roll out banking services for failure to meet the requirements.

== Subsidiary ==
- PLFS Investments Limited was established in 1998 and operates as a merchant bank.
