= International Leasing and Financial Services Limited =

Non-bank financial institution

- Formation: 1996
- Headquarters: Dhaka, Bangladesh
- Region served: Bangladesh
- Official language: Bengali
- Website: www.ilfsl.com

International Leasing and Financial Services Limited is a major non-bank financial institution in Bangladesh. Proshanta Kumar Halder, a banker and known as "Sultan of swindle", had according to media reports embezzled 30 billion taka from the institute and according to Bangladesh Bank 15.69 billion taka. The fraud was aided Amitav Adhikary, a cousin of Proshanta Kumar Halder and senior management at International Leasing and Financial Services Limited.

== History ==
International Leasing and Financial Services Limited was established in 1996. The institution received licence from the government of Bangladesh on 19 February 1996.

On 5 July 2004, Standard Bank Limited 150 million taka loan to International Leasing and Financial Services Limited.

In 2007, Dr Salehuddin Ahmed, Governor of Bangladesh Bank ordered the monitoring of nine non-banking financial institutions including International Leasing and Financial Services Limited.

On 24 June 2008, the International Leasing and Financial Services Limited established a branch in Chittagong.

The institute bought Hongkong Bangladers Securities Limited on 25 October 2009. Stock Brokerage Operations began in Sylhet and Khatunganj branches in 2010.

In 2018, the International Leasing and Financial Services Limited made a profit of 180 million taka. In 2019, the International Leasing and Financial Services Limited made a loss of 28.02 billion taka. The chief financial officer of International Leasing and Financial Services Limited, Syed Abed Hasan, blamed the losses on bad loans. An Investigation by Bangladesh Bank found violation of banking rules and fraudulent loans to individuals and companies linked to Proshanta Kumar Halder.

In February 2020, the Bangladesh Supreme Court ordered the seizure of the passports and banks accounts of 20 former and current officials of International Leasing and Financial Services Limited, including Proshanta Kumar Halder, for embezzling money from the institute through fraudulent loans. The Court appointed Khondker Ibrahim Khaled, a former deputy governor of Bangladesh Bank, as chairman of International Leasing and Financial Services Limited on 19 January and who reported the financial condition of the institute had declined since 2016. Aside from International Leasing and Financial Services Limited, Proshanta Kumar Halder had also embezzled money from FAS Finance and Investment Limited, People's Leasing and Financial Services Limited, Reliance Finance Limited, and NRB Global Bank Limited totaling 102 billion taka.

The International Leasing and Financial Services Limited remained in the red in 2021.

In 2022, the accumulated loss of International Leasing and Financial Services Limited stood at 34.36 billion taka and despite that the prices of its shares rose significantly in the Dhaka Stock Exchange. The company offers shares to debtors in exchange of the debt. It signed an agreement with Sonar Bangla Capital Management Limited for cooperation. The price of its shares increased after the arrest of Proshanta Kumar Halder in India. Its chairman, Md. Nazrul Islam Khan, received the Bima Padak.
