= Prashanta Kumar Halder =

Bangladeshi-Canadian banker

P K Halder
- পি কে হালদার
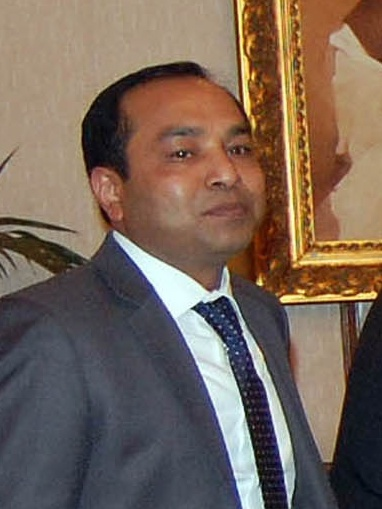
- Halder in 2015
- Born: Prashanta Kumar Halder; Patuakhali, Bangladesh
- Occupation: Banker
- Years active: 1999-2019

Prashanta Kumar Halder, also known as PK Halder, is a Bangladeshi-Canadian banker, businessman and finance officer. He is alleged to have embezzled more than 102 billion taka (US$854 million approximately as of 2024), one of the biggest fraud cases in Bangladesh. The Daily Star called him the "Sultan of Swindle".

== Early life ==
Prashanta Kuman Halder was born in a small village in Nazirpur Upazilla of the Pirojpur District to a Hindu family. His father's name is Prananendu Halder and mother's name is Lilavati Halder who was a teacher at a local governmental institute. He is the second son in the family. His elder brother's name is Pritish Kumar Halder. They both graduated from the Bangladesh University of Engineering and Technology. Later he got both his MBA & CFA from the University of Dhaka.

== Career ==
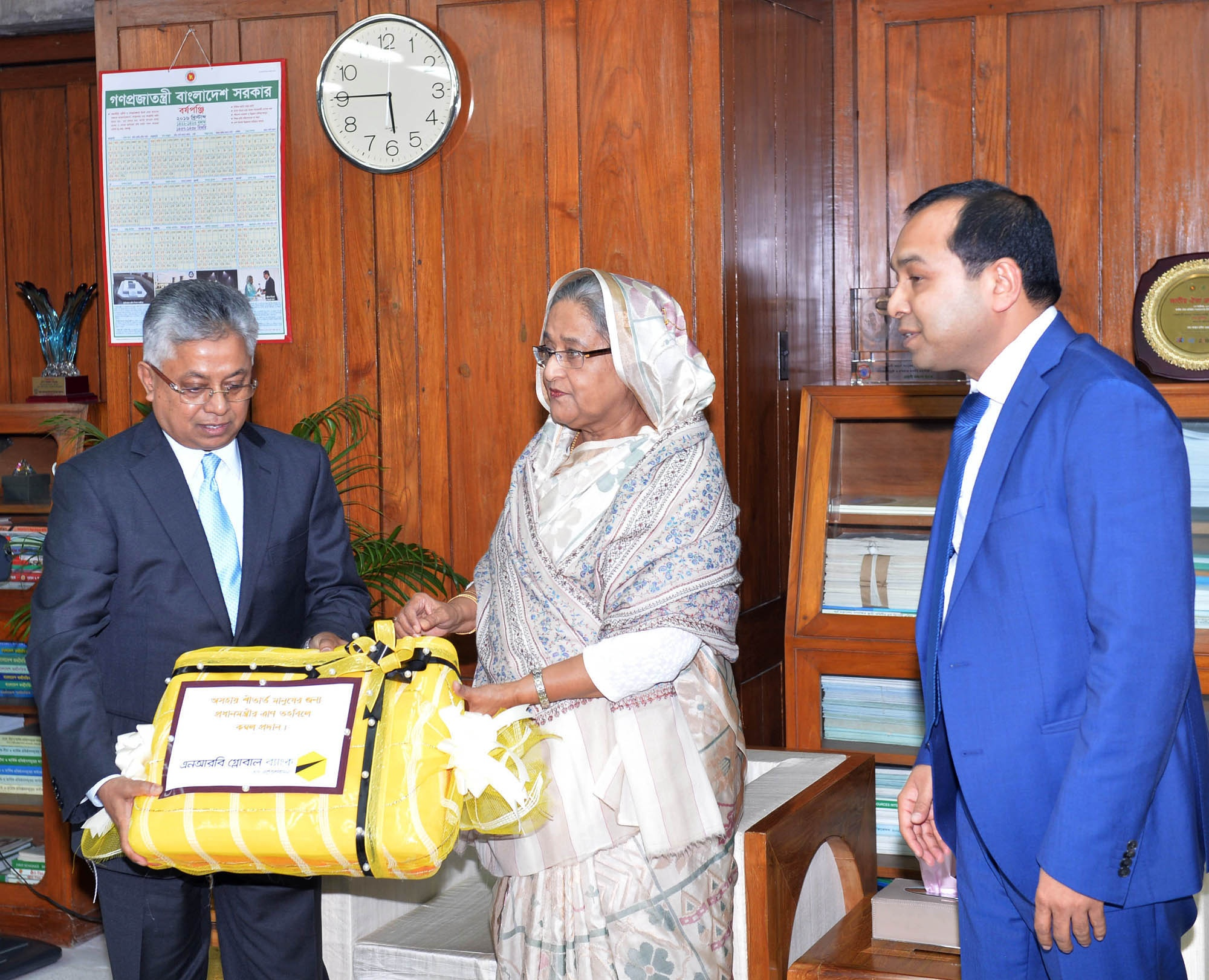
Prashanta Kumar Halder (rightmost) at a meeting with Prime Minister Sheikh Hasina in 2016.

In 2008, Halder was made the Deputy Managing Director of Industrial and Infrastructure Development Finance Company Limited.

Halder became the managing director of Reliance Finance Limited in 2009.

In July 2015, Halder was appointed the managing director of NRB Global Bank (later rebranded Global Islami Bank) which was owned by S. Alam.

Halder owned HAL international, whose director, Swapan Kumar Mistri, was a director of International Leasing and Financial Services Limited. Mistri's wife was the chairperson of Mutual Trust Bank Limited Marine. Uttam Kumar Mistri, Swapan's brother, and his wife, Atoshi Mridha, embezzled nearly 800 million taka from International Leasing and Financial Services Limited through a fake company called Kolasin From 2015 to 2019, Amitav Adhikari, Halder's cousin, was a director of People's Leasing And Financial Services Limited, and Uzzal Kumar Nandi, his former colleague, was the chairperson of People's Leasing And Financial Services Limited. They helped Halder embezzle millions from People's Leasing And Financial Services Limited. Halder than became chairman of People's Leasing And Financial Services Limited.

Investigations started against Halder in 2019 after a number of raids on illegal casinos in Dhaka.

According to Bangladesh Bank in 2020, Halder had stolen 15 billion taka from International Leasing and Financial Services Limited, 22 billion from FAS Finance & Investment Limited, 30 billion from People's Leasing And Financial Services Limited, and 25 billion taka from Reliance Finance Limited. He was being investigated by Bangladesh Financial Intelligence Unit and the Anti Corruption Commission.

In March 2020, Halder fled to India from Bangladesh through Benapole one hour before a travel ban was issued against him. From there he fled to Canada of which he is a citizen. He owns P&L Hal Holding Incorporated in Canada, which was founded on 3 July 2014.

In December 2020, Halder's properties in Dhaka were seized by the Anti Corruption Commission. He also owned Aziz Fibre Jute Control, Northern Jute Manufacturing Company Limited, Rahman Chemicals, and Simtex Industries. His cousin, Amitabh Adhikari, left his admin cadre job at Bangladesh Civil Service and joined two of the companies.

In January 2021, his associate NI Khan was ordered by a court to not leave Bangladesh which was later revoked on appeal. Anti Corruption Commission called 14 associates of Halder to their office for investigation in the laundering by Halder in February 2021. On 5 April 2021, Halder was sued by Abdul Alim, majority owner of Clewiston Foods and Accommodation which had agreements with Radisson Blue to establish a hotel in Cox's Bazar. According to Alim Halder demanded majority share of his company in 2014 in return for approving his loan. Halder's associate, Pritish Kumar Sarker, and managing director of FAS Finance & Investment Limited was prevented from leaving Bangladesh by Bangladesh Bank. Halder refused to return to Bangladesh despite a court order.

In November 2021, Anti Corruption Commission filled charges against Halder and his associates including his brother Pritish Kumar Halder.

== Arrest ==
In May 2022, PK Halder arrested by Indian official from Ashoknagar, North 24 Parganas district, India. "Besides Bangladeshi and Indian passports, PK Halder was also found in possession of a Grenadian passport. It has also been learnt that the Interpol has issued Red corner notice (RCN) against Proshanta Kumar Halder," the Directorate of Enforcement reports.
