= Chittagong Stock Exchange =

Stock exchange in Chittagong

- চট্টগ্রাম স্টক এক্সচেঞ্জ
- Type: Stock Exchange
- Location: Chittagong, Bangladesh
- Founded: 12 February 1995
- Owner: Chittagong Stock Exchange PLC
- Key people: AKM Habibur Rahman (Chairman); M. Shaifur Rahman Mazumdar (Managing Director)
- Currency: Bangladeshi taka (৳)
- No. of listings: 250
- Market cap: US$ 38.1 billion (2020)
- Indices: CSE30; CSCX; CASPI; CSI; CSE50
- Website: cse.com.bd

The Chittagong Stock Exchange (CSE; Bengali: চট্টগ্রাম স্টক এক্সচেঞ্জ) is a stock exchange based in the port city Chittagong, Bangladesh. It is one of the twin financial hubs of the country, alongside the Dhaka Stock Exchange.

== History ==
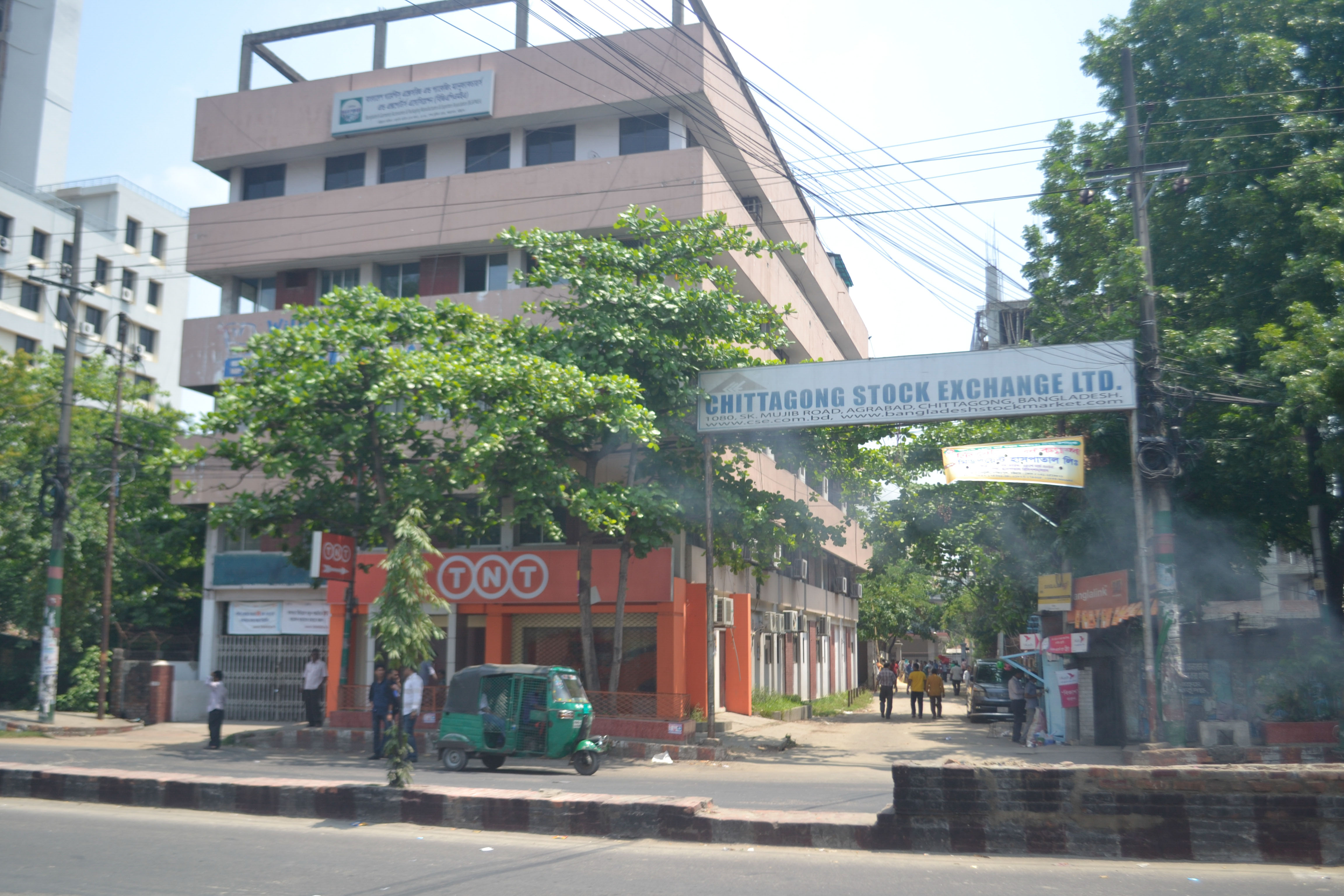
Chittagong Stock Exchange

Chittagong Stock Exchange groundwork began in January 1995, when founding members sought approval from the Bangladesh Government. The Securities and Exchange Commission granted authorization for its establishment on 12 February 1995, making CSE the second stock exchange in the country. The exchange was governed by a twelve-member board, chaired by Amir Khosru Mahmud Chowdhury, and operated under an independent secretariat.

The exchange was formally inaugurated on 4 November 1995, by the then Prime Minister of Bangladesh, Begum Khaleda Zia. CSE was incorporated as a company on 1 April 1995, and trading commenced on the same day using the cry-out system.

The CSE has evolved over the years by adopting new technologies to enhance trading efficiency. Notably, it introduced an internet-based trading system on 30 May 2004, significantly modernizing its operations. Additionally, on 8 July 2015, the CSE unveiled a new brand logo as part of its ongoing modernization efforts.

It has a combined market capitalization of over US$ 38 billion as of 2020.

== Trading hours ==
The Chittagong Stock Exchange (CSE) currently opens at 10:00 AM and closes at 1:30 PM. However, starting 26 January 2026, the trading hours will be extended to 9:30 AM to 2:45 PM.

== Criticism and controversies ==
=== 2011 share market scam ===
The bullish market turned bearish during 2010, with the exchange losing 1,800 points in December 2010 and January 2011. Millions of investors were rendered bankrupt as a result of the market crash. The crash is believed to be artificially manufactured to benefit a handful of players at the expense of the big players amid the market regulator's failure to oversee the situation.

== See also ==
- List of South Asian stock exchanges
- List of stock exchanges in the Commonwealth of Nations
