= Non-bank financial institution =

Institution without a full banking license

A non-banking financial institution (NBFI) or non-bank financial company (NBFC) is a financial institution that is not legally a bank; it does not have a full banking license or is not supervised by a national or international banking regulatory agency. NBFCs facilitate bank-related financial services, such as investment, risk pooling, contractual savings, and market brokering. Examples of these include hedge funds, insurance firms, pawn shops, cashier's check issuers, check cashing locations, payday lending, currency exchanges, and microloan organizations.

In 1999, Alan Greenspan identified the role of NBFIs in strengthening an economy, as they provide "multiple alternatives to transform an economy's savings into capital investment which act as backup facilities should the primary form of intermediation fail." Operations of non-bank financial institutions are not typically covered under a country's banking regulations.

== Etymology ==
The term non-bank likely started as non-deposit taking banking institution. However, due to financial regulations adopted from English speaking countries, non-English speaking countries took "non-bank" as a single word. This is probably because in English speaking countries the term 'bank' is generally accepted as equivalent to 'financial institution' but outside English speaking countries, especially developing countries, see the term bank as deposit taking institutions only, and every other financial service providers as something that must not be termed a bank.

This is possibly due to language differences. But also importantly, this is likely due to developing countries in the past having adopted the western banking system much later than the West. As developing countries adopted, or learned the financial system from English speaking countries, there was a higher focus in regulatory terms such as bank and non-bank, while not understanding that non-bank is actually a shortened version of non-deposit taking bank. This is in contrast to English speaking countries as in English speaking countries the general public, as well as regulatory institutions, refer to financial institutions as simply a "bank" in many instances.

== Role in financial system ==
NBFIs supplement banks by providing the infrastructure to allocate surplus resources to individuals and companies with deficits. Additionally, NBFIs also introduces competition in the provision of financial services. While banks may offer a set of financial services as a packaged deal, NBFIs unbundle and tailor these service to meet the needs of specific clients. Additionally, individual NBFIs may specialize in one particular sector and develop an informational advantage. Through the process of unbundling, targeting, and specializing, NBFIs enhances competition within the financial services industry.

Non-bank financial companies (NBFCs) offer most sorts of banking services, such as loans and credit facilities, private education funding, retirement planning, trading in money markets, underwriting stocks and shares, TFCs(Term Finance Certificate) and other obligations. These institutions also provide wealth management such as managing portfolios of stocks and shares, discounting services, such as discounting of instruments and advice on merger and acquisition activities. The number of non-banking financial companies has expanded greatly in the last several years as venture capital companies, retail and industrial companies have entered the lending business.

Non-bank institutions also frequently support investments in property and prepare feasibility, market or industry studies for companies. However they are typically not allowed to take deposits from the general public and have to find other means of funding their operations such as issuing debt instruments.

NBFCs typically don't provide cheque books, saving accounts or current accounts. It may only takes fixed deposit or time deposits.

=== Growth ===
Some research suggests a high correlation between a financial development and economic growth. Generally, a market-based financial system has better-developed NBFIs than a bank-based system, which is conducive for economic growth.linkages between bankers and brokers.

=== Stability ===
A multi-faceted financial system that includes non-bank financial institutions can protect economies from financial shocks and enable speedy recovery when these shocks happen. NBFIs provide “multiple alternatives to transform an economy's savings into capital investment, [which] serve as backup facilities should the primary form of intermediation fail.”

However, in the absence of effective financial regulations, non-bank financial institutions can actually exacerbate the fragility of the financial system.

Since not all NBFIs are heavily regulated, the shadow banking system constituted by these institutions could wreak potential instability. In particular, CIVs, hedge funds, and structured investment vehicles, up until the 2008 financial crisis, were entities that focused NBFI supervision on pension funds and insurance companies, but were largely overlooked by regulators.

Because these NBFIs operate without a banking license, in some countries their activities are largely unsupervised, both by government regulators and credit reporting agencies. Thus, a large NBFI market share of total financial assets can easily destabilize the entire financial system. A prime example would be the 1997 Asian financial crisis, where a lack of NBFI regulation fueled a credit bubble and asset overheating. When the asset prices collapsed and loan defaults skyrocketed, the resulting credit crunch led to the 1997 Asian financial crisis that left most of Southeast Asia and Japan with devalued currencies and a rise in private debt.

Due to increased competition, established lenders are often reluctant to include NBFIs into existing credit-information sharing arrangements. Additionally, NBFIs often lack the technological capabilities necessary to participate in information sharing networks. In general, NBFIs also contribute less information to credit-reporting agencies than do banks.

For continual growth and sustenance of NBFCs, it is important to have a regulation around them while maintaining their innovativeness. An introduction of regulatory sandbox in different ecosystem will help them achieve the desired results.

== Types ==
=== Risk-pooling institutions ===
Insurance companies underwrite economic risks associated with illness, death, damage and other risks of loss. In return to collecting an insurance premium, insurance companies provide a contingent promise of economic protection in the case of loss. There are two main types of insurance companies: general insurance and life insurance. General insurance tends to be short-term, while life insurance is a longer-term contract, which terminates at the death of the insured. Both types of insurance, life and general, are available to all sectors of the community.

Although insurance companies do not have banking licenses, in most countries insurance has a separate form of regulation specific to the insurance business and may well be covered by the same financial regulator that also covers banks. There have also been a number of instances where insurance companies and banks have merged thus creating insurance companies that do have banking licenses.

=== Contractual savings institutions ===
Contractual savings institutions run investment funds like pension and mutual funds. They give individuals the opportunity to invest in funds as fiduciaries rather than as principals. Funds pool resources from individuals and firms into various financial instruments such as equity and debt. The individual holds equity in the fund itself, rather directly in the investments.

The two main types of mutual funds are open-end and closed-end funds. Open-end funds generate new investments by allowing the public to purchase new shares at any time, and shareholders can liquidate their holding by selling the shares back to the open-end fund at the net asset value. Closed-end funds issue a fixed number of shares in an IPO. In this case, the shareholders capitalize on the value of their assets by selling their shares in a stock exchange.

Mutual funds are usually distinguished by the nature of their investments. For example, some funds specialize in high risk, high return investments, while others focus on tax-exempt securities. There are also mutual funds specializing in speculative trading (i.e. hedge funds), a specific sector, or cross-border investments.

Pension funds are mutual funds that limit the investor's ability to access their investments until a certain date. In return, pension funds are granted large tax breaks in order to incentivize the working population to set aside a portion of their current income for a later date after they exit the labor force (retirement income).

=== Market makers ===
Market makers are broker-dealer institutions that quote a buy and sell price and facilitate transactions for financial assets. Such assets include equities, government and corporate debt, derivatives, and foreign currencies. After receiving an order, the market maker immediately sells from its inventory or makes a purchase to offset the loss in inventory. A major contribution of the market makers is improving the liquidity of financial assets in the market.

=== Specialized sectorial financiers ===
They provide a limited range of financial services to a targeted sector. For example, real estate financiers channel capital to prospective homeowners, leasing companies provide financing for equipment and payday lending companies that provide short-term loans to individuals that are underbanked or have limited resources, like Uganda Development Bank.

=== Financial service providers ===
Financial service providers include brokers (both securities and mortgage), management consultants, and financial advisors, and they operate on a fee-for-service basis. Their services include: improving informational efficiency for the investors and, in the case of brokers, offering a transactions service by which an investor can liquidate existing assets.

== In Asia ==
According to the World Bank, approximately 30% total assets of South Korea's financial system was held in NBFIs as of 1997. In this report, the lack of regulation in this area was claimed to be one reason for the 1997 Asian financial crisis.

As of 2019, China's banking system is estimated to hold the equivalent of US$8.3 trillion in assets (or approximately 20% of total bank assets) largely in the form of loans wrapped by NBFI investments (eg: by credit-enhancement, or a guaranteed debt instrument).

== In Europe ==
The European Commission's Payment Services Directive (PSD) regulates payment services and payment service providers throughout the European Union (EU) and European Economic Area. The PSD describes which types of organisation can provide payment services in Europe: credit institutions (.e: banks), certain authorities (eg: central banks, government bodies), electronic money institutions (EMI) and payment institutions. Organisations that are not credit institutions or EMI can apply for authorisation to be a payment institution in any EU country of their URL choice (where they are established) and then passport their payment services into other states across the EU.

=== Classification ===
==== By liability structure ====
Based on their liability structure, NBFCs have been divided into two categories.

1. Category ‘A’ companies (NBFCs-D) accept public deposits
2. Category ‘B’ companies do not accept public deposits
  1. Category ‘B’ companies with under a billion euros (NBFCs-ND)
  2. Category ‘B’ companies with over €1B (systemically important, NBFCs-ND-SI)

NBFCs-D are subject to requirements of capital adequacy, liquid assets maintenance, exposure norms (including restrictions on exposure to investments in land, building and unquoted shares), asset and liability management (ALM) discipline and reporting requirements.

In contrast, until 2006, NBFCs-ND were subject to minimal regulation. Since April 1, 2007, non-deposit taking NBFCs with assets over €1B are classified as systemically important. Prudential regulations, such as capital adequacy requirements and exposure norms with reporting requirements, apply to these companies. The ALM reporting and disclosure norms have also been made applicable to them at different points in time.

==== By nature of activity ====
Depending upon their nature of activities, non-banking finance companies can be classified into the following categories, also known as notified entities:

- Development finance institutions
- Leasing companies
- Investment companies
- Modaraba companies
- House finance companies
- Venture capital companies
- Discount & guarantee houses
- Corporate development companies

== In the United States ==
In 1996, the NBFI sector accounted for approximately $200 billion in transactions in the United States.

== See also ==
- Alternative financial service
- Financial economics
- Private credit
- Shadow banking system
