= Muhammad Ayub Mia =

Mohammad Ayub Miah
- Occupations: Civil servant, banker
- Known for: Chairman of Sammilito Islami Bank

Mohammad Ayub Miah is a Bangladeshi former civil servant and banker. He is the chairman of Sammilito Islami Bank PLC.

== Career ==
In February 2008, Miah was publicly accused by Misbaur Rahman Chowdhury, a leader of the Islami Oikya Jote, of involvement in war crimes during the Bangladesh Liberation War and serving in the Al Badr, a paramilitary force of the Pakistan Army. He denied the allegations, stating that he had been a school student in 1971 and said those making the claims should be punished if they could not prove them. He was the Secretary of the Ministry of Food and Disaster Management.

Miah retired as a senior secretary in the Government of Bangladesh.

In November 2025, Miah was appointed chairman of Sammilito Islami Bank PLC following approval from Bangladesh Bank. Sammilito Islami Bank PLC was formed through the merger of five banks: First Security Islami Bank, Global Islami Bank, Social Islami Bank, Exim Bank, and Union Bank. He resigned on 16 March 2026, citing personal reasons.

After the fall of the Sheikh Hasina-led Awami League government, he was appointed a member of the Consensus Commission. The chairman of the commission was Muhammad Yunus and the vice-chairman was Ali Riaz. He had also served in the Public Administration Reform Commission.
