= S. Alam =

Bangladeshi-Singaporean businessman

- এস. আলম
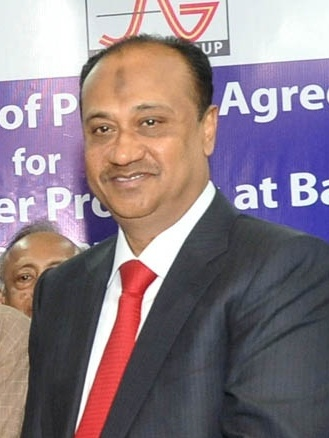
- Alam in 2016
- Born: Mohammed Saiful Alam Masud Chowdhury; 1960 (age 65–66); Patiya, Chittagong
- Citizenship: Singapore (2023–present); Bangladesh
- Occupation: Businessperson
- Organization: S. Alam Group of Industries
- Known for: Large scale money laundering
- Parents: Mozaherul Anwar (father); Chemon Ara Begum (mother)
- Relatives: Akhtaruzzaman Chowdhury Babu (maternal uncle); Saifuzzaman Chowdhury (cousin)

Mohammed Saiful Alam Masud Chowdhury (commonly known as S. Alam) is a Bangladeshi-born Singaporean businessman and the founder and chairman of the S. Alam Group of Industries, a major industrial conglomerate in Bangladesh. Alam has been the subject of allegations involving large-scale financial irregularities, including accusations of embezzlement, money laundering, and misuse of banking systems. He has been accused of siphoning off a total of $234 billion from Bangladesh in foreign currency with the help of associates linked to the government of Sheikh Hasina.

== Early life ==
Alam was born in 1960 in Patiya Upazila, Chattogram. His mother's name is Chemon Ara Begum, and his father's name is Mozaherul Anwar. He is the fourth of twelve siblings, including seven brothers and five sisters. He is the nephew of Akhtaruzzaman Chowdhury Babu.

== Career ==
=== S. Alam Group ===
Alam started his career in 1980 as an agent of corrugated iron sheet with the help of his maternal uncle Babu and later ventured into transportation business. He later expanded his business into steel, cement, food, and energy sector. In 2004, the S. Alam Group took control of First Security Islami Bank from Sikder Group and Alam became the bank's chairman.

After the victory of Awami League in 2014 general elections, he became very close to the Prime Minister Sheikh Hasina. Between 2016 and 2017, he gradually gained control over Islami Bank, Social Islami Bank, National Bank, and Commerce Bank. Union Bank, Global Islami Bank, and Al-Arafah Islami Bank also came under his family's control.

== Dispute with Bangladeshi authorities ==
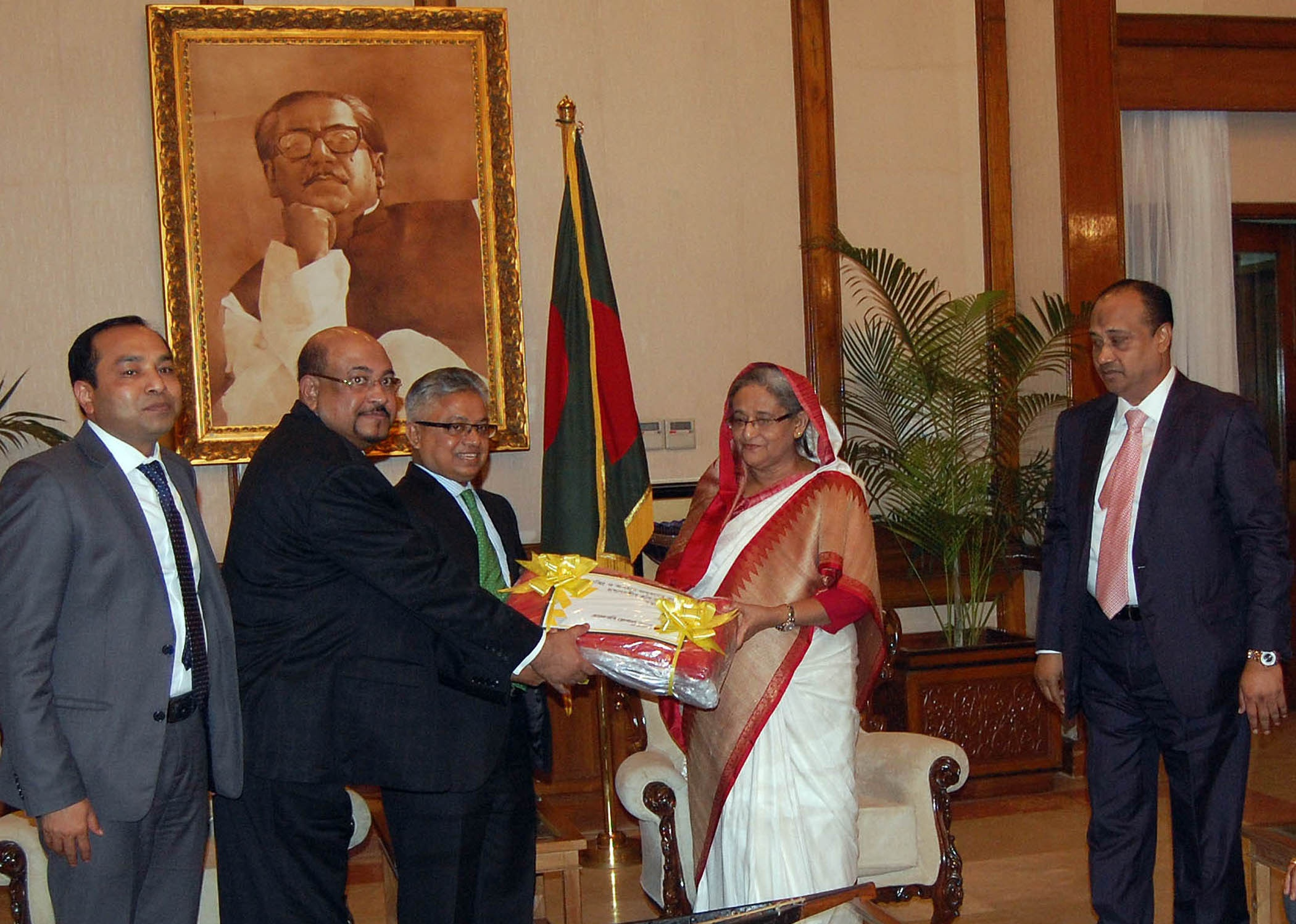
S. Alam (rightmost) and P.K. Halder (leftmost), chairman of S. Alam-owned NRB Global Bank at a meeting with Prime Minister Sheikh Hasina in 2015

=== Alleged corruption and money laundering ===
In 2023, the High Court of Bangladesh directed the government to investigate allegations that Alam unlawfully invested Tk 11,000 crore (about $1 billion) in Singapore and other countries. In 2025, Anti-Corruption Commission of Bangladesh filed several cases against Alam over allegations of large-scale money laundering during the tenure of Awami League government.

In August 2024, it was reported that the Bangladesh Bank had decided to dissolve S Alam Group's control over Islami Bank. S Alam Group had been accused of appointing 7,240 employees, mostly from his hometown Patiya, violating the government regulations of bank.

In September 2024, an investigation by The Business Standard alleged that Alam had invested US$700 millions in three hotels and a retail space in a shopping mall in Singapore by illegally siphoning out foreign currency from Bangladesh. Following the publication of the report, the Singapore's Financial Intelligence Unit sought information from Bangladesh Financial Intelligence Unit (BFIU) about the S. Alam Group and its owner.

In 2025, Prothon Alo alleged that taking advantage of the banks owned by Alam and the political affiliation with Sheikh Hasina's Government, nearly 200,000 crore taka was allegedly withdrawn from nine banks and financial institutions. They alleged that the S. Alam accumulated wealth across several countries, using the names of family members, children, and sons-in-law to take loans, implicating the entire family in irregularities.

In May 2026, reporting by Prothom Alo and The Daily Star alleged that in 2017, Alam, with support from Directorate General of Forces Intelligence chief Mohammad Akbar Hossain, took control of Islami Bank Bangladesh and Social Islami Bank Limited through pressure and later restructured the board of directors of both banks.

On 21 May 2026, the Nicosia District Court in Cyprus ordered the seizure of assets owned by Alam and his wife in Parekklisia, Cyprus, following an application by Cyprus's anti-money laundering unit (MOKAS) acting on a request from Bangladeshi authorities through a mutual legal assistance process.

On 19 May 2026, Money Loan Court-1 in Chittagong sentenced Alam and 10 others, including wife Farzana Parveen, his brothers Osman Gani, Md Rashedul Alam, Abdus Samad to five months in prison on charges of loan default of BDT 84.49 crore.

An investigation by independent British news media The Financial Times estimated the total amount embezzled by Alam and his associates to be US$234 billions.

In several cases against Alam, the court ordered the confiscation of assets owned by him and his family both in Bangladesh and Singapore.

=== Renunciation of Bangladeshi citizenship ===
On 10 October 2022, Alam, his wife, and their three sons surrendered their Bangladeshi passports. The same day, they were granted permanent residency in Bangladesh as foreign nationals, facilitated by the Ministry of Home Affairs under directives from senior government authorities. Analysts suggest that it may have been intended to ease money laundering and limit legal accountability in case of future scrutiny.

In November 2025, the High Court of Bangladesh suspended the government’s acceptance of Alam’s renunciation of Bangladeshi citizenship. Alam received his Singaporean citizenship in 2023. In February 2026, Alam re-applied for the renunciation of his and his family's Bangladeshi citizenship, following the formation of the newly elected government of Bangladesh. The application was not considered by the Ministry of Home Affairs of Bangladesh because it remained a pending issue with a stay order from the High Court of Bangladesh.

=== Arbitration case against the Government of Bangladesh ===
In October 2025, Alam initiated an arbitration proceeding against the Government of Bangladesh at the World Bank's International Centre for Settlement of Investment Disputes (ICSID). Filed under the 2004 Bangladesh–Singapore bilateral investment treaty, the case alleged that government actions—such as asset freezing and confiscation—caused significant financial losses to the S. Alam group and the family.

In February 2026, the Government of Bangladesh appointed a British law firm to represent the government in the arbitration case filed by Alam.
