= Khizir Hayat =

Bangladeshi Judge

Khizir Hayat Lizu

Justice of the High Court Division of Bangladesh
- In office 6 August 1997 – 20 March 2025

Personal details
- Born: 24 January 1967 (age 59)
- Education: University of Dhaka
- Profession: Judge

Justice Khizir Hayat Lizu was a justice of the High Court Division of Bangladesh Supreme Court.

== Early life ==
Khizir Hayat Lizu was born on 24 January 1967 in Gopalgonj. His mother was a housewife. His father fought in the Bangladesh Liberation War and was martyred . He was then only 4 year old when he lost his father. He completed bachelor's and master's degrees in political science at the University of Dhaka. He also completed his bachelor's degree in law, masters in philosophy, and PhD from the University of Dhaka.

== Career ==
Hayat started his practice on 6 August 1997 at the Dhaka District Court.

On 9 February 2001, Hayat started practicing at the High Court Division of Bangladesh Supreme Court.

Hayat was appointed an additional judge of the High Court Division on 31 May 2018.

On 30 May 2020, Hayat was made a permanent judge of the High Court Division.

In June 2022, Hayat and Justice Md Mozibur Rahman Miah ordered an investigation into allegations of discrimination against Muslim students wearing the hijab in educational institutions.

Hayat and Justice Md Nazrul Islam Talukder criticized the upazila nirbahi officer of Teknaf, Md Kaisar Khasru, for using crude words attacking a journalist reporting on him. Hayat and Justice Md Nazrul Islam Talukder criticized the Anti-Corruption Commission for not going after major loan defaulters. They criticized Md Masud Biswas, the chief of Bangladesh Financial Intelligence Unit, for submitting an improper statement to the High Court Division Bench. Hayat and Justice Md Nazrul Islam Talukder ordered various regulatory agencies to investigate irregular loans at First Security Islami Bank, Islami Bank Bangladesh Limited, and Social Islami Bank Limited on 4 December 2022. The judges also asked S Alam Group to explain 300 billion BDT loan the group took from Islami Bank Bangladesh. Hayat and Justice Md Nazrul Islam Talukder imposed a travel ban on Toufique Imrose Khalidi, editor of bdnews24.com, in a case filed by the Anti-Corruption Commission over 420 million taka in unexplained wealth.

In January 2023, Hayat and Justice Md Nazrul Islam Talukder asked Rajdhani Unnayan Kartripakkha to explain how it had lost 30 thousand files from its servers. Hayat and Justice Md Nazrul Islam Talukder ordered the Anti-Corruption Commission to end their investigation 4.72 billion BDT graft at the Standard Asiatic Oil Company Limited, a subsidiary of the state owned Bangladesh Petroleum Corporation. Hayat and Justice Md Nazrul Islam Talukder sought an explanation from the National Bank Limited Gulshan branch why it allowed the owner of Infratech Construction Company Limited to withdraw 226 million BDT from the branch after working hours at night.

Hayat was one of the two judges who declared the 2018 freedom fighter quota-related circular illegal. As a consequence, the 2024 quota reform movement began.

On October 21, 2024, Hayat was suspended from judicial duties, and on 20 March 2025, President Mohammed Shahabuddin removed him from the High Court Division due to "serious misconduct".
