= Al-Arafah Islami Bank =

Islamic bank in Bangladesh

Al-Arafah Islami Bank PLC.
- Type: Public limited company
- Traded as: DSE: ALARABANK; CSE: ALARABANK
- Industry: Banking; Financial services
- Founded: 1995
- Headquarters: Dhaka, Bangladesh
- Key people: Badiur Rahman (Chairman); Mohd. Rafat Ullah Khan (Managing Director); Sayed Abul Hashem FCA, FCMA (Chief Financial Officer); Mohammad Moniruzzaman, FCA (Acting) (Company Secretary)
- Products: ATM services; Banking services; Consumer banking; Corporate banking; Investment banking; La-Riba Islamic Credit Carf
- Net income: ▲ ৳227.6 crore (US$19 million)
- Number of employees: 5768 (2023)
- Website: www.aibl.com.bd

Al-Arafah Islami Bank PLC. (Bengali: আল-আরাফাহ্ ইসলামী ব্যাংক পিএলসি) is a Shariah Based Islamic bank in Bangladesh.

== History ==
Al-Arafah Islami Bank PLC. is a shariah compliant bank in Bangladesh founded on 27 September 1995. A shariah council of the bank is responsible for ensuring the bank activities meet shariah requirements. The headquarters are located in Motijheel, Dhaka.

Al-Arafah Islami Bank PLC. has initiated a project entitled “Krishi O Grameen Khudra Biniog Prokolpa (Microfinance). With this project, Al-Arafah Islami Bank PLC is working for reduction of poverty, development in agricultural sectors, creation of job opportunities etc.

Md Abdus Samad Sheikh was appointed managing director of the bank in 2005.

Md Abdus Samad Sheikh was re-appointed managing director of the bank in 2008.

In September 2010, Al-Arafah Islami Bank PLC. issued shares to raise funds to meet the requirements of Basel II.

A security officer of Al-Arafah Islami Bank PLC. was killed in May 2015 during a bank robbery attempt in Chittagong.

The Bank signed an agreement with Islamic Development Bank, based in Saudi Arabia, for investment. In May 2016, Abdus Samad, vice-chairman of S. Alam Group, was elected chairman of Al-Arafah Islami Bank PLC. Mohammed Abdus Salam was elected vice chairman of Al-Arafah Islami Bank PLC.

In May 2017, Md Enayet Ullah was elected chairman of Al-Arafah Islami Bank PLC. and Salim Rahman, managing director of KDS Group, was elected vice-chairman.

In June 2018, the Anti Corruption Commission sued Badiur Rahman, a director of Al-Arafah Islami Bank PLC and chairman of the bank from 2008 to 2016, for laundering 16.8 million BDT to Singapore to a company he established there called Ariel Maritime (Pvt) Limited.

In August 2021, Salim Rahman, managing director of KDS Group, was elected chairman of Al-Arafah Islami Bank PLC. Abu Naser Mohammad Yeahea, chairman of Purbachal Steel Mills and Purbachal Gas Filling Station, was elected vice-chairman of the bank.

In March 2022, the Bank invested five billion BDT in Unique Hotel and Resorts Limited. Bangladesh Securities and Exchange Commission approved Al-Arafah Islami Bank Limited request to raise five billion BDT through the issuance of bonds in August 2022. S. Alam Group sued Feni District based Golden Life Insurance agent who had posting against the group on social media and posters under the Digital Security Act. The agent had accused the group of embezzling money from banks under its control, such as Al-Arafah Islami Bank PLC, Bangladesh Commerce Bank, First Security Islami Bank, Islami Bank Bangladesh PLC, NRB Global Bank, Social Islami Bank, and Union Bank.

The Al-Arafah Islami Bank PLC. burrowed 750 million BDT from Sonali Bank at a 9 percent interest rate in January 2023 following a cash shortage at the bank. The Bank donated 40 million BDT to Ashrayan-2 Project of Prime Minister Sheikh Hasina.

Following the fall of the Sheikh Hasina led Awami League government, Bangladesh Bank dissolved the board of directors of Al-Arafah Islami Bank. It appointed a new chairman, Khwaja Shahriar, and independent directors for the bank.
