= Sammilito Islami Bank =

Bangladeshi commercial bank

Sammilito Islami Bank PLC
- Native name: সম্মিলিত ইসলামী ব্যাংক
- Type: State-owned
- Industry: Banking; Financial services
- Predecessor: First Security Islami Bank PLC; Global Islami Bank PLC; Social Islami Bank PLC; Union Bank PLC; Export Import Bank of Bangladesh PLC
- Founded: sammilitobankbd.com
- Key people: Mohammad Ayub Mia (Chairman)

Sammilito Islami Bank (Bengali: সম্মিলিত ইসলামী ব্যাংক) is a state-owned commercial bank in Bangladesh. The bank was created through the merger of five troubled Islamic banks. On November 9 2025, Bangladesh Bank issued a letter of intent (LoI) and a no objection certificate for establishing Sammilito Islami Bank. Former senior secretary Mohammad Ayub Mia has been appointed as founder chairman of this Bank.

== Formation ==
With the decision of the Government, five existing banks being merged are First Security Islami Bank, Global Islami Bank, Social Islami Bank, EXIM Bank, and Union Bank. Bangladesh bank revealed that the new entity will have a total Paid-Up Capital of Tk 35,000 crore-Tk 20,000 crore contributed by the government and Tk 15,000 crore from depositors' shares. The initially authorized capital is set at Tk 40,000 crore.
