= Md. Anwarul Azim Arif =

Bangladeshi academic (1951–2026)

- আনোয়ারুল আজিম আরিফ
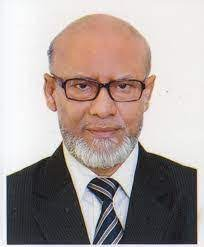

Vice-chancellor of the University of Chittagong
- In office 15 June 2011 – 14 June 2015
- Preceded by: Mohammad Alauddin
- Succeeded by: Iftekhar Uddin Chowdhury

Vice-chancellor of the International Islamic University Chittagong
- In office 28 March 2021 – August 2024

Chairman of the Social Islami Bank Limited
- In office 2017–2021

Personal details
- Born: 1 May 1951 Satkania, East Bengal, Dominion of Pakistan
- Died: 19 March 2026 (aged 74) Chittagong, Bangladesh
- Education: University of the Philippines (MBA); University of Chittagong (B.Com & M.Com)
- Occupation: Academic

Md. Anwarul Azim Arif (1 May 1951 – 19 March 2026) was a Bangladeshi academic and banker. He was the vice-chancellor of University of Chittagong and International Islamic University Chittagong. Arif was the one time chairperson of Social Islami Bank Limited.

Arif was also the chairman of the central executive committee of the Central Shariah Board for Islamic Banks of Bangladesh.

== Early life ==
Arif completed his master's degree in commerce at the University of Chittagong. He completed his MBA at the University of the Philippines.

== Career ==
Arif joined the University of Chittagong as a lecturer in 1976 in the Management Studies department. He joined National Bank as a probationary officer in 1984.

From 7 January 2012 to 6 August 2012, Arif was the dean of the Faculty of Engineering.

From 2011 to 2015, Arif was the vice-chancellor of the University of Chittagong. In August 2011, he successfully convinced proctor Mohammad Akter Hossain and three assistant proctors to rescind their resignation. They had resigned following bad behavior of Bangladesh Chhatra League activists with them.

Arif was appointed the chairperson of Social Islami Bank Limited in November 2017. He was the additional managing director of First Security Islami Bank Limited. Kazi Osman Ali was appointed managing director of Social Islami Bank under Arif. After his appointment nine directors of the bank resigned which included Hakim Md. Yousuf Harun Bhuiyan, one of five shareholders and head of Hamdard Laboratories (Waqf) Bangladesh. Former chairman of the bank, Major (Retired) Md. Rezaul Haque, was removed and replaced by Arif as part of the Chittagong-based S. Alam Group of Industries conglomerate's consolidation of control over the bank. Arif was appointed a representative of Hasan Abason Limited, a subsidiary of S. Alam Group of Industries.

In July 2021 to August 2024, Arif was the vice-chancellor of International Islamic University Chittagong.

== Death ==
Arif died on 19 March 2026, at the age of 74. He had long been suffering from diabetes and was undergoing hospital treatment at the time of his death.
