= Melk (disambiguation) =

Melk a city in the Austrian state of Lower Austria.

Melk may also refer to:

- MELK, Maternal embryonic leucine zipper kinase, an enzyme in humans
- Melk Abbey, Benedictine abbey above the town of Melk, Austria
- Melk (footballer) (born 2006), Melquisedeque Costa de Oliveira, Brazilian footballer
- Melk concentration camp, forced labor unit camp in Mauthausen, Upper Austria
- Melk Costa (born 1996), Brazilian mixed martial artist
- Melk en Honing, 2015 album by Author & Punisher
- Melk Formation, geologic formation on Austria
- Melk District, district in Lower Austria, Austria
- Melk Reform, reform of monastic life begun at Melk Abbey in 1418
- Heinrich von Melk (12th century), German satirist
- Suzanne Melk (1908-1951), French pilot and female aviation pioneer

== See also ==
- Akhund Melk, village in Rahimabad Rural District, Iran
- Hire Purchase under Shirkatul Melk (HPSM), a type of hire purchase contract approved in Shariah
- Mauer bei Melk, municipality of Dunkelsteinerwald, Austria
- Oberndorf an der Melk, municipality in Scheibbs, Austria
- Stiftsgymnasium Melk, Roman Catholic Benedictine-run gymnasium in Melk, Austria
