= Anwarul Azim =

Anwarul Azim (Bengali: আনোয়ারুল আজীম), a Bengali masculine given name of Arabic origin, may also refer to:

- M Anwarul Azim (1931–1971), industrial administrator
- Md. Anwarul Azim Arif (born 1951), academic and banker
- Md. Anwarul Azim Anar (1968–2024), politician
- Anwarul Azim (politician), politician
