= Social Islami Bank =

Bangladeshi Sharia-compliant bank

Social Islami Bank PLC
- Formerly: Social Investment Bank Limited
- Type: Public
- Traded as: DSE: SIBL; CSE: SIBL
- Industry: Banking and financial services
- Founded: Dhaka, Bangladesh
- Headquarters: 90/1, City Center, Motijheel, Dhaka-1000, Bangladesh
- Products: Banking services Consumer Banking; Corporate Banking; Investment Banking; Islamic Banking
- Net income: ৳668 crore (US$54 million) (December,2018)
- Website: siblbd.com

Social Islami Bank PLC (SIBPLC; Bengali: সোশ্যাল ইসলামী ব্যাংক পিএলসি) is a Shari'ah based Islami Bank in Bangladesh. It was established on 22 November 1995 as Social Investment Bank Limited. Later it changed name to Social Islami Bank Limited. Up to October 2021, SIBL has 181 branches including 22 AD (Authorized Dealer) branches, 234 subbranches, 271 agent banking outlets and 223 ATM Booths.

== History ==
Social Islami Bank Limited is a Sharia compliant bank in Bangladesh which started operations on 22 November 1995. SIBL was founded by M. A. Mannan, Dr. Hamid Al Gabid, Former Secretary General of O.I.C., Dr. Abdullah Omar Nasseef, and Ahmed M. Salah Jamjoom, Former Commerce Minister, Kingdom of Saudi Arabia. It is a public limited company registered under the Companies Act of 1994 and regulated by Bank Company Act 1991. The bank is an Islamic bank, based on Islamic Sharia law forbidding usury.

In 2009, the bank changed their name from Social Investment Bank Limited to Social Islami Bank Limited.

In July 2012, the US Senate Permanent Subcommittee on Investigations, a Congressional found evidence of terrorism financing after examining the bank documents in their investigation of HSBC. They also found evidence of impropriety against the founder of the bank and first chairman, MA Mannan. They identified the International Islamic Relief Organisation and Lajnat-al-Birr-al-Islam, Islamic Charitable Society, who are shareholders of the bank, with having links to terror organizations. The bank has denied all allegations of terror financing and has claimed that they are trying to get the two Saudi companies in dispute to sell their shares in the bank. After the report came out, the bank filed a case with a local court to remove the two organizations as shareholders.

The bank engages in corporate social responsibility through donations. SIBL apologized to Bangladesh Bank over financial irregularities in 2015. According to International Consortium of Investigative Journalists, the bank had suspicious transactions from 2014 to 2016.

In November 2017, seven directors of the Social Islami Bank Limited resigned following a board meeting at The Westin Dhaka. Bangladesh Bank did not follow its own rules so that it could quickly accept the resignation letter of the bank chairman Md Rezaul Haque. Two days later the number of resigning directors increased to nine. Seven new independent directors and two shareholding directors were appointed to replace them. The changes took place after S Alam Group took over 50 per cent shares of the bank. The replacement had ties to S. Alam Group. The group had purchased the shares through 19 subsidies violating the Banking Company Act, 1991. The chairman of S. Alam Group, Mohammed Saiful Alam, also owns other banks in Bangladesh which are Bangladesh Commerce Bank, First Security Islami Bank, Islami Bank Bangladesh, NRB Global Bank, and Al-Arafah Islami Bank. Anwarul Arif was made chairman of the new board of the bank. The managing director of First Security Islami Bank, Quazi Osman Ali, was appointed managing director of Social Islami Bank Limited. Former governor of Bangladesh Bank, Salehuddin Ahmed, described the situation as concerning since S. Alam Group had taken control over a large number of banks.

In 2019, the bank rescheduled a record number of loans, 29.5 billion BDT, accounting for 50 per cent of all rescheduled loans in Bangladesh that year.

In 2022, it emerged that S. Alam Group had purchased the banks, including Social Islami Bank Limited, with bank loans. In November, US$1.64 billion was stolen from the bank through letter of credits. The Bank protested the report while Bdnews.com defended their report based on the report of Bangladesh Financial Intelligence Unit. On 4 December, the High Court Division ordered the government of Bangladesh to investigate loans scams at Social Islami Bank Limited, First Security Islami Bank Limited, and Islami Bank Bangladesh Limited. According to Ahsan H Mansur, director of Policy Research Institute of Bangladesh, alleged S. Alam Group had taken 800 billion BDT from banks it owns. In December, Bangladesh Securities and Exchange Commission allowed Social Islami Bank Limited and Islami Bank Bangladesh Limited to raise funds through issuing bonds. Bangladesh Bank appointed observers for the First Security Islami Bank Limited, and Islami Bank Bangladesh Limited. S. Alam Group filed a Digital Security Act against an insurance agent who had posted posters alleging the group had stolen funds from Social Islami Bank and six other banks.

In January 2023, Bangladesh Bank approved emergency loans for Social Islami Bank Limited, First Security Islami Bank, Global Islami Bank, and Union Bank worth 67 billion BDT.

== Shareholding ==
Shareholding Position [as on 28 February 2019]
Type	Percentage
Sponsor/Director	30.23%
Institute	48.10%
Foreign	1.36%
Public	20.21%

== Subsidiaries ==
01. SIBL Securities Limited (SIBLSL)

02. SIBL Investment Limited (SIBLIL)

== Banking Products and Services ==
- Investment Products
  - Bai-Muazzal
  - Hire Purchase under Shirkatul Melk
  - HPSM-Ijara
  - Murabaha
  - Musharaka
  - Bai-Salam
  - Quard and others
- Deposit Products
  - Mudaraba Scheme Deposits
  - Al Wadiah Current Account
  - Mudaraba Savings Deposit
  - Mudaraba Savings Deposit
  - Mudaraba Term Deposit
  - Cash Waqf Deposit
- Card Products
  - SIBL Credit Card
  - SIBL Zameel Debit Card
  - SIBL Hajj Card
