= International Islamic University Chittagong =

Private University in Chittagong, Bangladesh

Coordinates: 22.3561°N 91.8372°E

- আন্তর্জাতিক ইসলামী বিশ্ববিদ্যালয় চট্টগ্রাম
- Other name: IIUC
- Former name: Islamic University Chittagong
- Motto: Combines Quality with Morality
- Type: Private, research
- Established: February 11, 1995; 31 years ago
- Accreditation: Institution of Engineers, Bangladesh; International Association of Universities; Bangladesh Bar Council; Association of Commonwealth Universities; Pharmacy Council of Bangladesh
- Affiliations: University Grants Commission (UGC)
- Chairman: ANM Shamsul Islam
- Chancellor: President Mirza Fakhrul Islam Alamgir
- Vice-Chancellor: Mohammad Ali Azadi
- Faculty: 430
- Students: 12,000 (July 2022)
- Undergraduates: 8,838 (November 2014)
- Postgraduates: 1,133 (November 2014)
- Location: Kumira, Chattogram-4318, Bangladesh
- Campus: 40 acres (16 ha); Urban Rural
- Website: www.iiuc.ac.bd

University rankings

Regional – Overall
- QS Asia: 1201-1300 (2026)

The International Islamic University Chittagong (IIUC; Bengali: আন্তর্জাতিক ইসলামী বিশ্ববিদ্যালয় চট্টগ্রাম) is a Bangladeshi private university in Chattogram, Bangladesh. It was founded in 1995 under the Private Universities Act of 1992 (Act no. 34 of 1992). Islamic University Chittagong Trust (IUCT) is the founder organization of this university. It is one of the oldest private Higher Educational Institutions in Chittagong.

== History ==
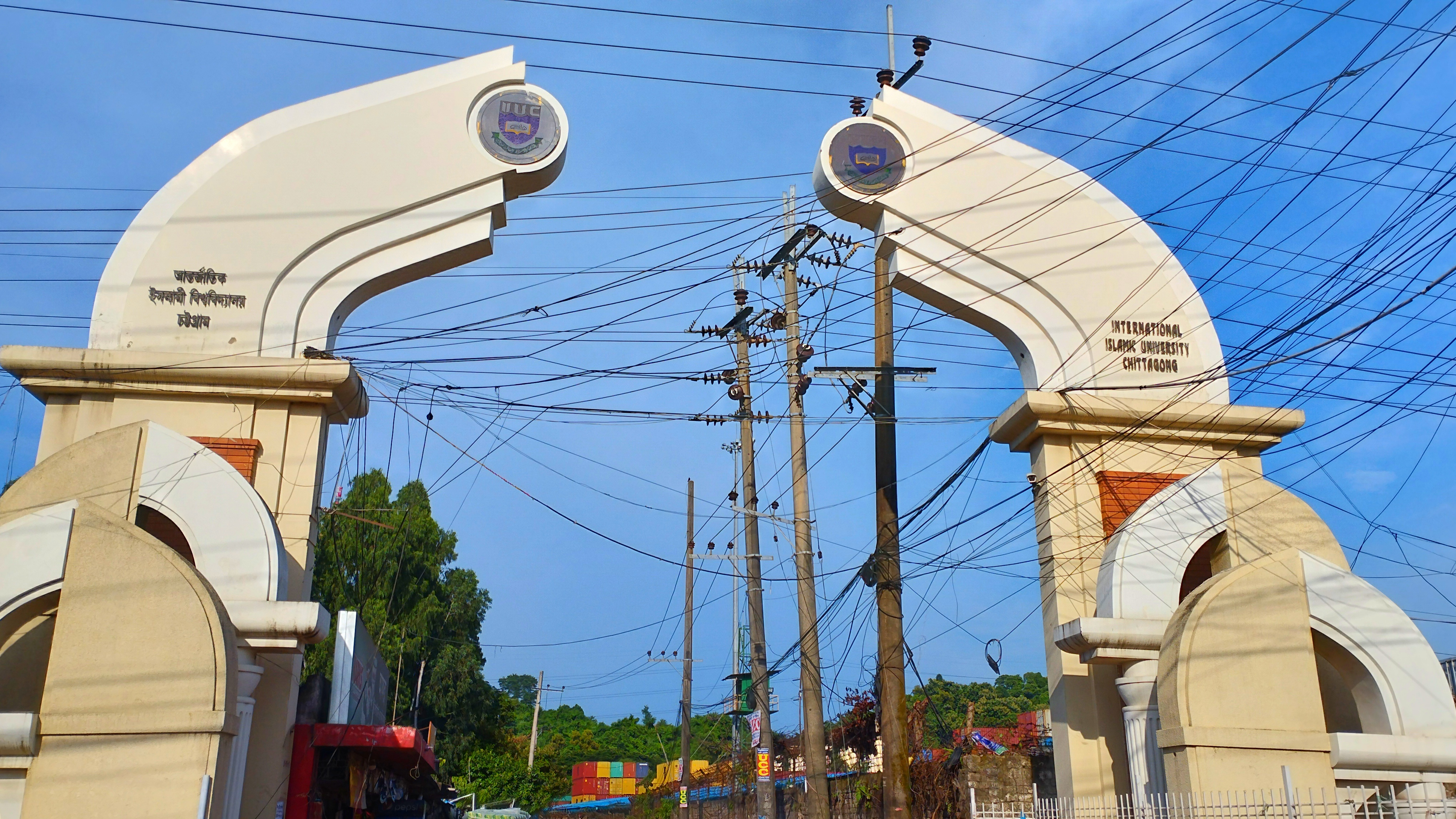
IIUC ENTRANCE

Islamic University Chittagong (IUC) was founded in 1995 by Islamic University Chittagong Trust (IUCT), a non-profit organization. In 2000, IUC was upgraded to International Islamic University Chittagong (IIUC).

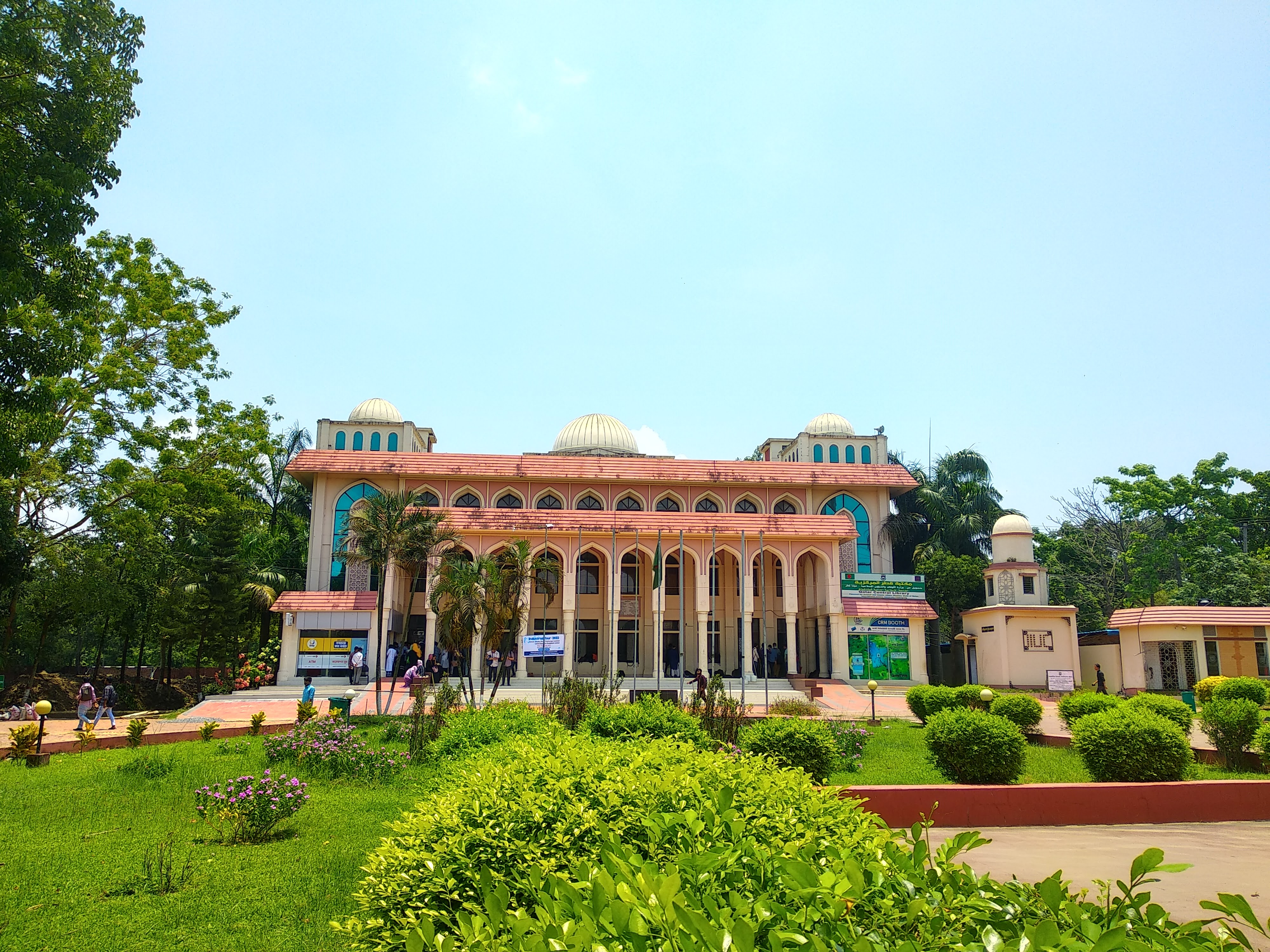
The Central Library Of IIUC

In 2004 IIUC was recognized as one of the 9 top-graded (A Category) Private University of Bangladesh. At present, it is one of the largest private universities with 435 (Full time: 352) teachers and 12,000 students from home and abroad.

== List of vice-chancellors ==
Name	Term
Mohammad Ali Azadi	5 February 2025 - Present
Mohammad Ali Azadi (Acting)	8 August 2024 - 4 February 2025
Anwarul Azim Arif	April 2021 – August 2024
K M Golam Mohiuddin	8 August 2017 - 27 March 2021
A K M Azharul Islam	3 November 2012 - 7 August 2017
Abu Bakr Rafique (Acting)	7 January 2012 - 2 November 2012
M. Mahbub Ullah	16 January 2008 - 5 January 2012
A K M Azharul Islam	25 September 2002 - 15 January 2008
Mohammad Ali	1 July 1998 – 24 September 2002
Abu Bakr Rafique (Acting)	1 March 1997 – 30 June 1998
Muhammad Loqman (Honorary)	11 February 1995 – 28 February 1997

== Rankings ==
The International Islamic University Chittagong (IIUC) has been ranked by Webometrics and Cyber-metric ranking, and is also one of the top 10 universities in Bangladesh. Webometrics Ranking of World Universities: Ranked IIUC 23rd out of 147 universities in Bangladesh. Cyber-metric ranking: Ranked IIUC 23rd in the country out of 170 public and private universities in July 2021. UGC ranking: Ranked IIUC among the top 10 universities in Bangladesh in 2018.

== Campus ==
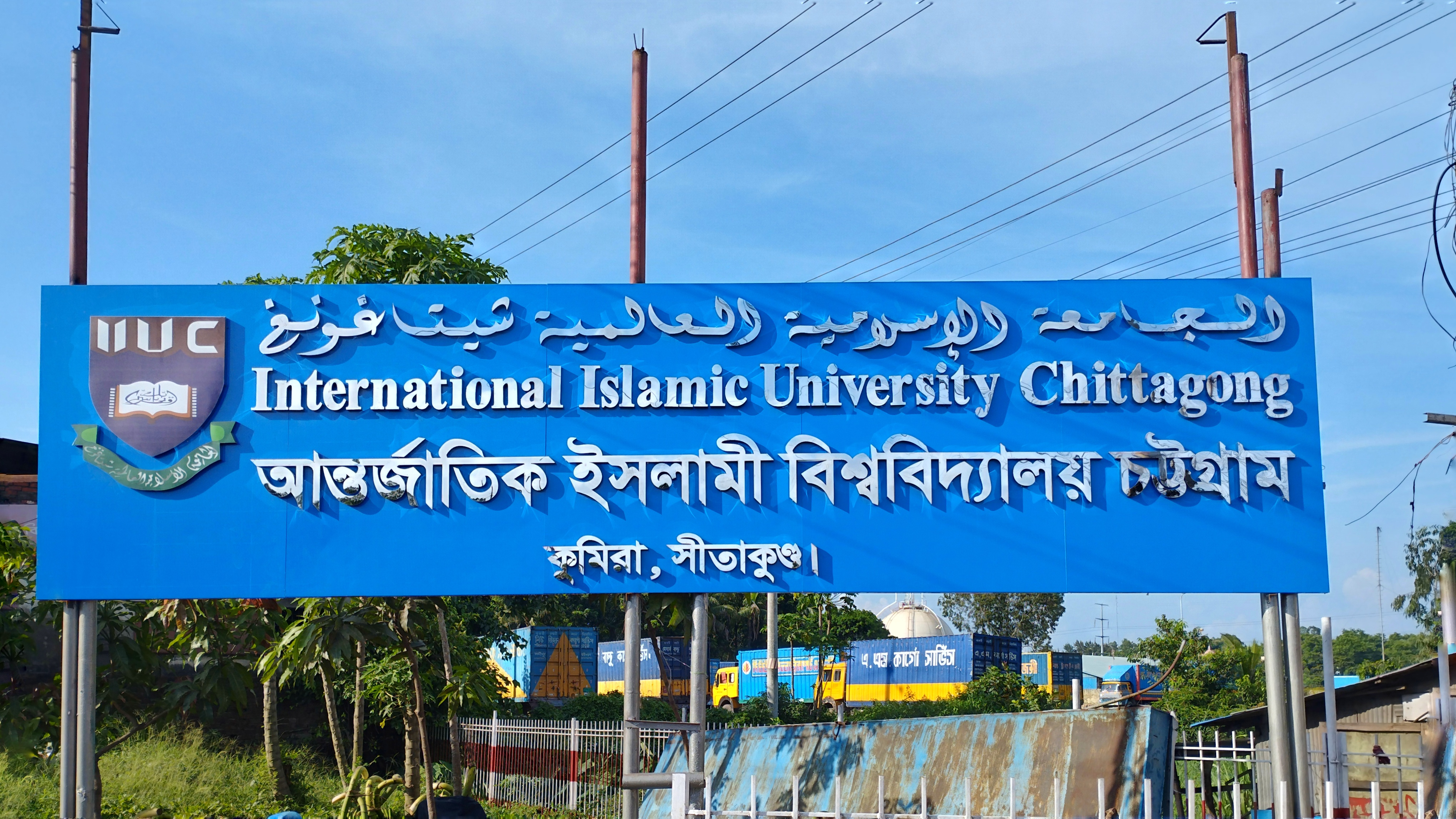
IIUC signboard

The International Islamic University Chittagong (IIUC) has a 40-acre campus in Kumira (Sitakunda), situated 22 km from Chattogram City. The campus is located beside the Dhaka-Chattogram highway in a hilly area.

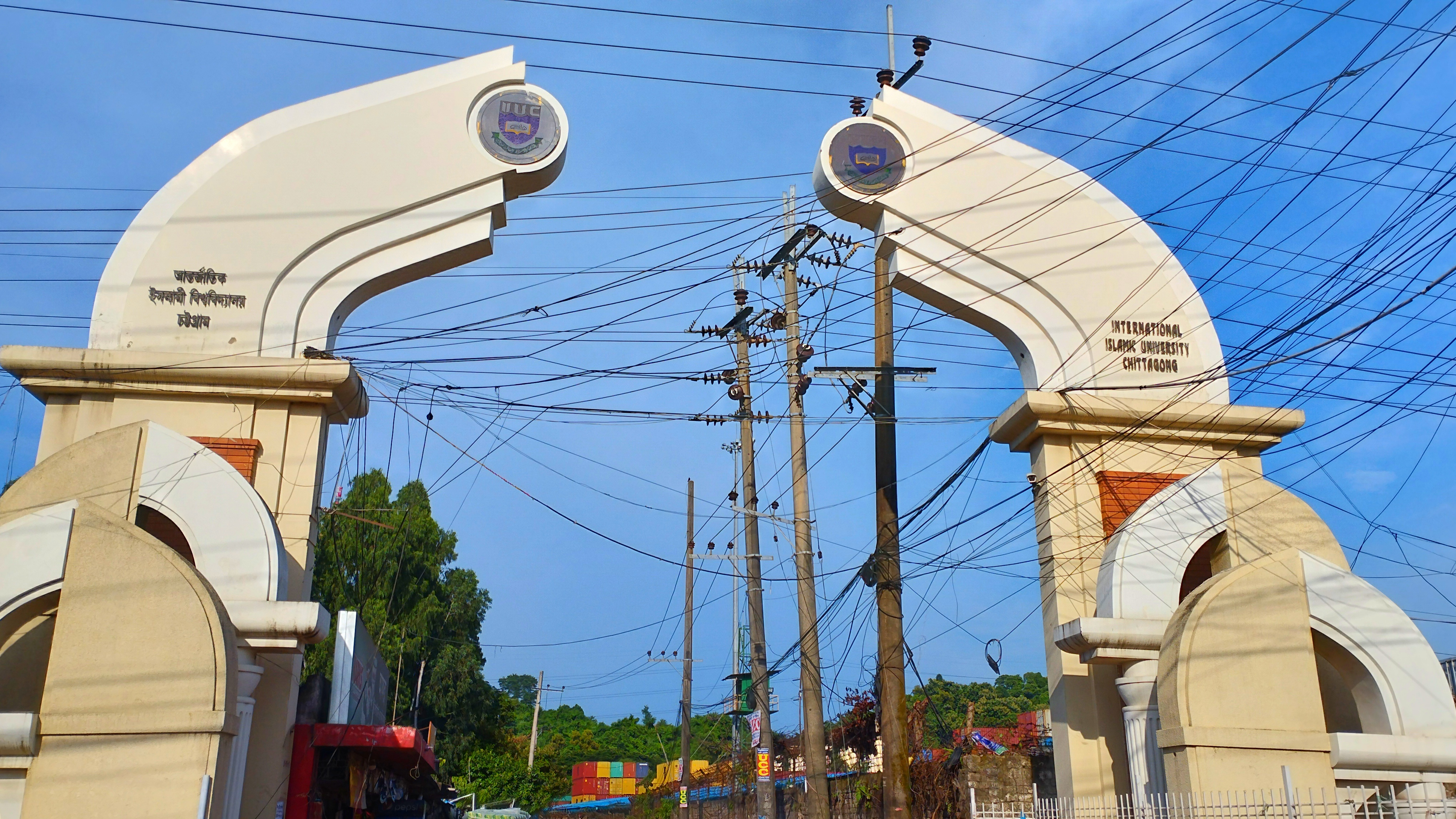
IIUC main gate

== Degrees offered ==
The university offers several undergraduate and postgraduate degrees:

=== Faculty of Science & Engineering ===
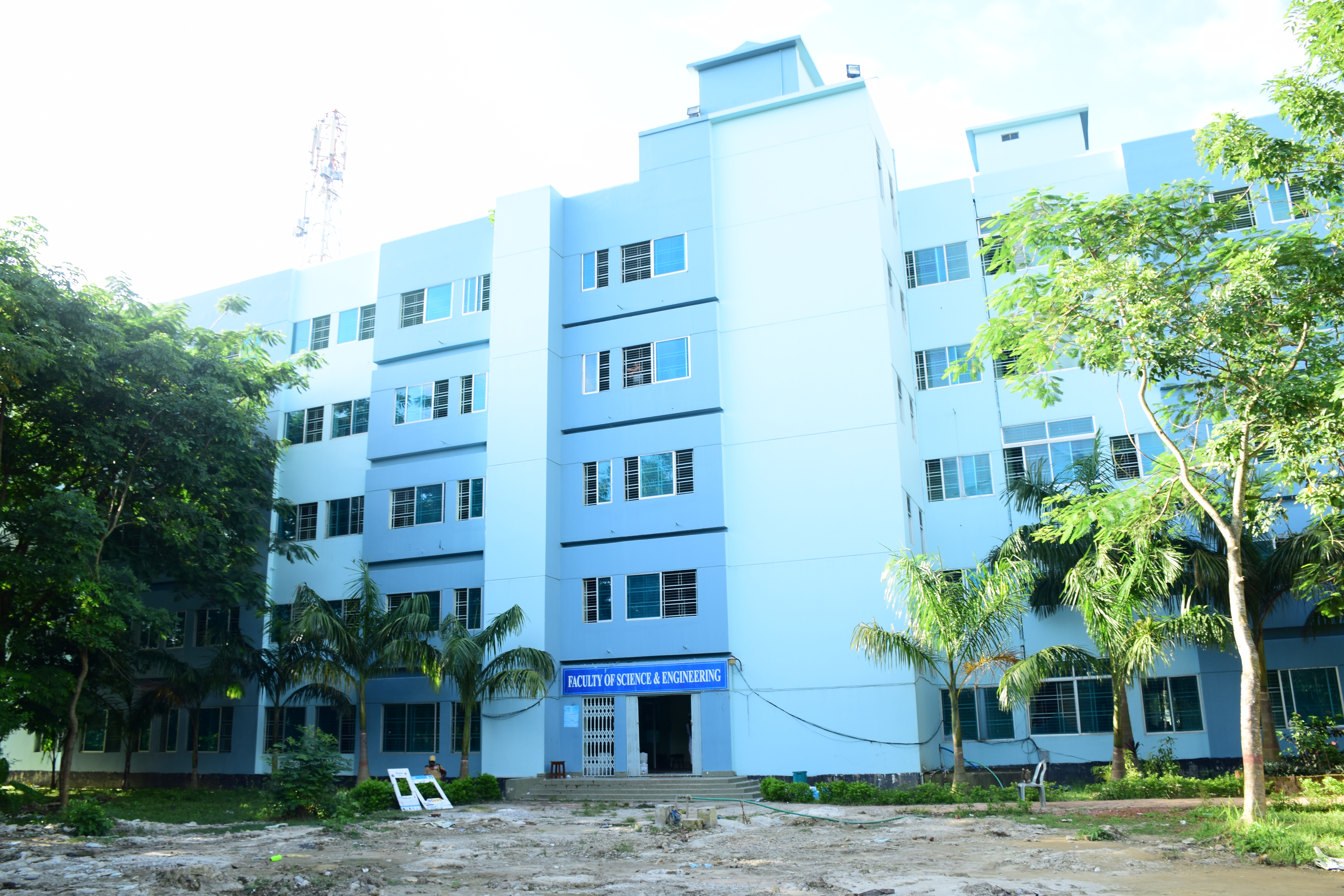
FSE building

1. Department of Computer Science & Engineering (CSE):

- Bachelor of Science in Computer Science and Engineering (B.Sc. Engg. in CSE) [IEB Accredited]
- Professional Diploma in Computer Science (DCS).
- Masters of Science in Computer Science and Engineering (M.Sc. in CSE)

2. Department of Electrical and Electronic Engineering (EEE)

- Bachelor of Science in Electrical and Electronic Engineering (B.Sc. Engg. in EEE) [IEB Accredited]

3. Department of Computer & Communication Engineering (CCE):

- Bachelor of Science in Computer and Communication Engineering (B.Sc. Engg. in CCE) [IEB Accredited]

4. Department of Electronic and Telecommunication Engineering (ETE):

- Bachelor of Science in Electronic and Telecommunication Engineering (B.Sc. in ETE)

5. Department of Civil Engineering (CE):

- Bachelor of Science in Civil Engineering (B.Sc. in CE)

6. Department of Pharmacy:

- Bachelor of Pharmacy (B.Pharma.)

=== Faculty of Business Studies ===
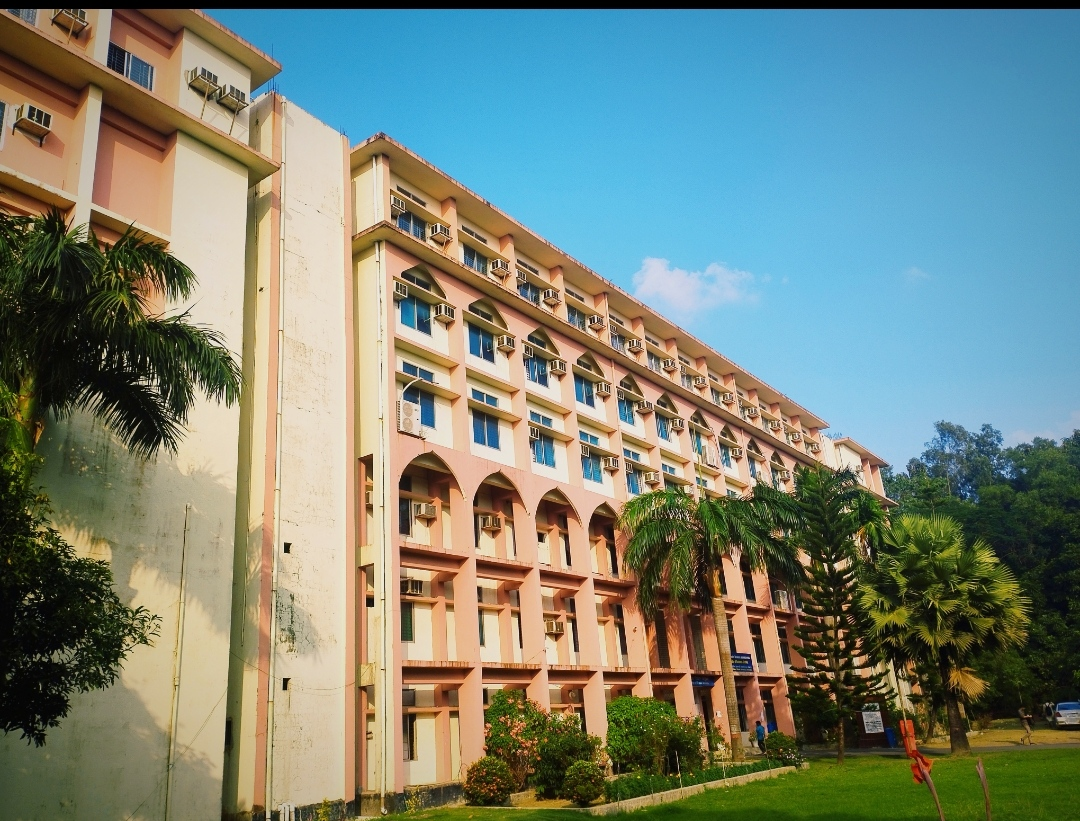
BBA FACULTY, IIUC

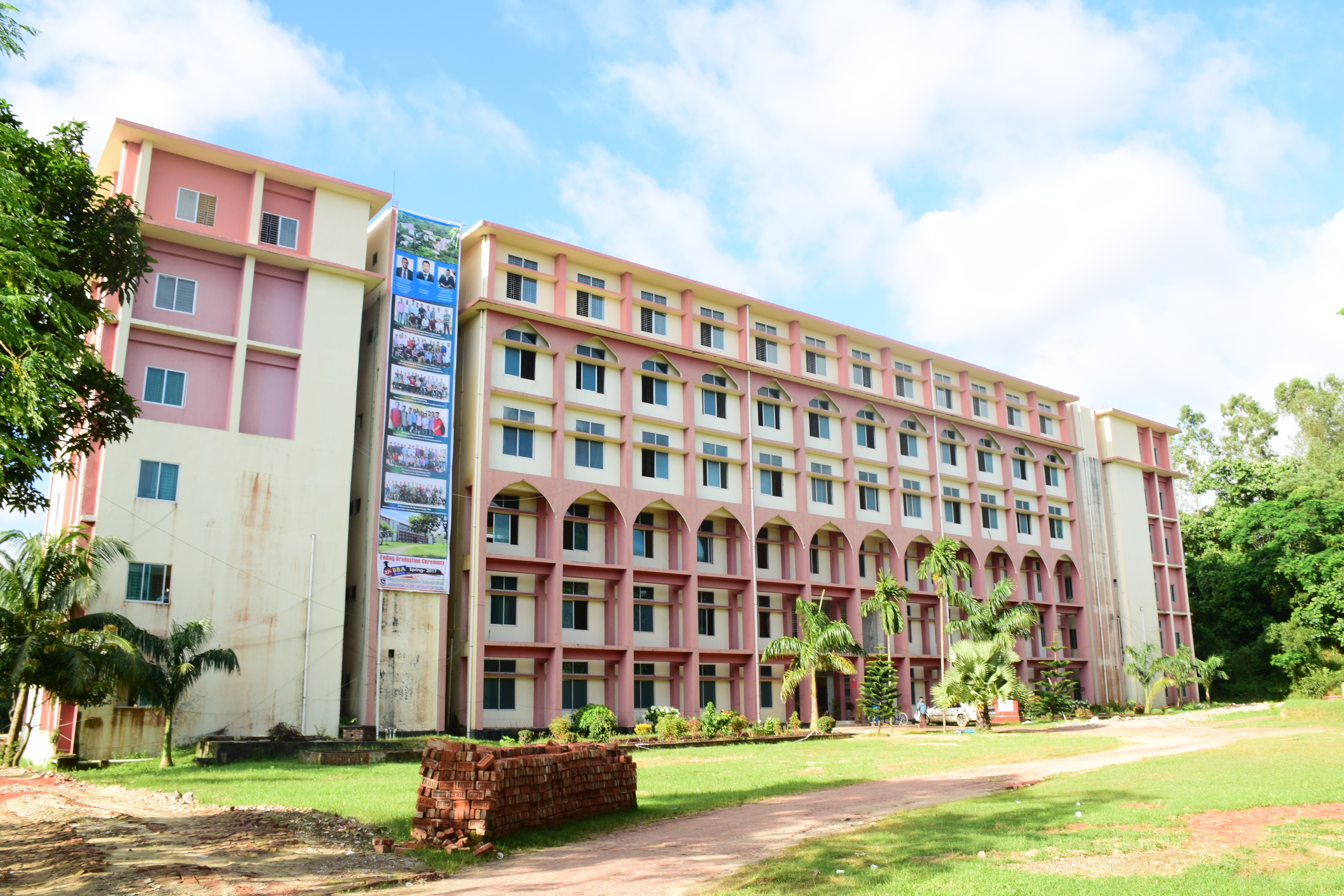
BBA faculty

- Master of Business Administration (MBA) [Regular]
- Master of Business Administration (MBA) [Executive]
- Master of Bank Management (MBM)
- Bachelor of Business Administration (BBA)

=== Faculty of Law ===
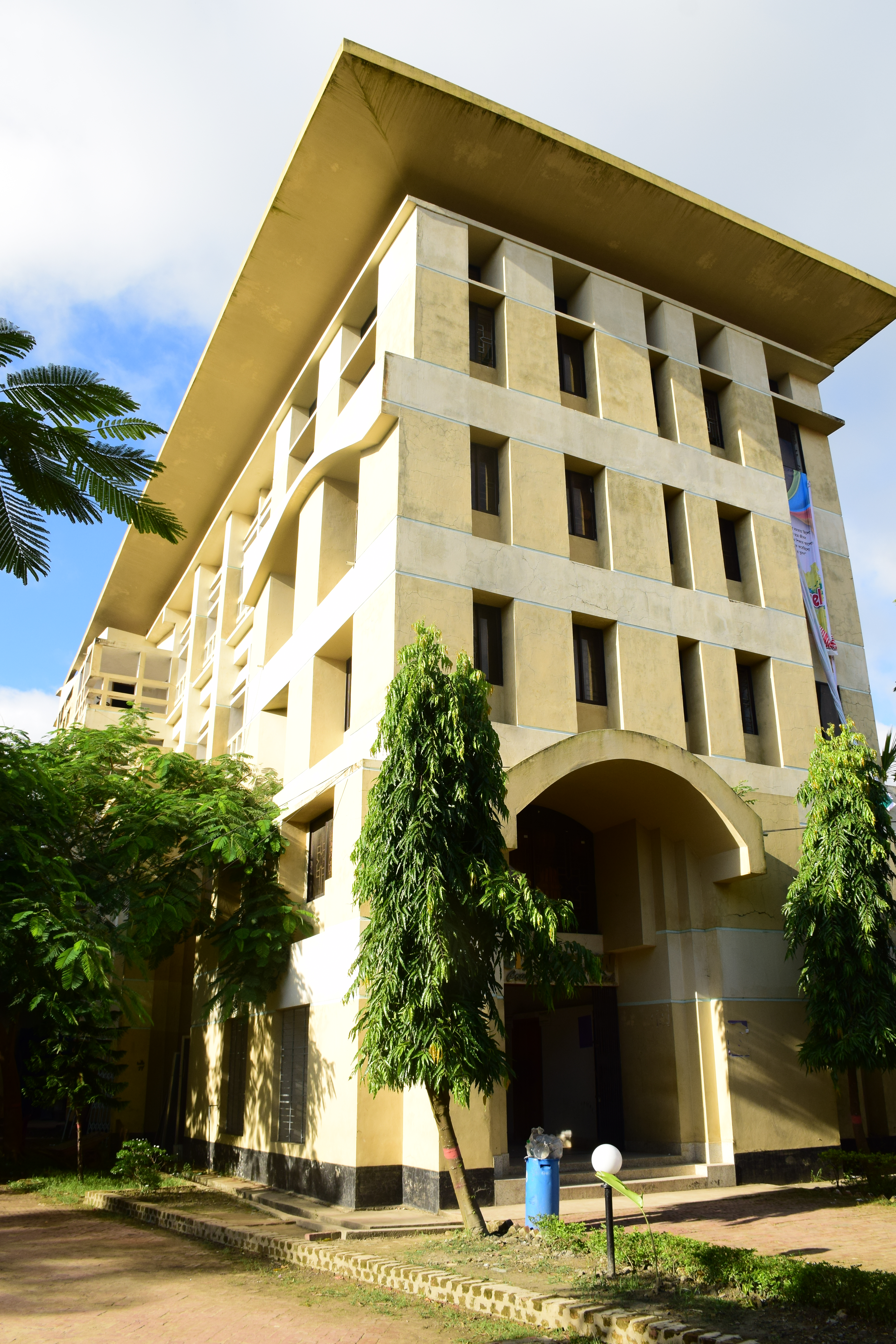
FACULTY OF LAW, IIUC

- Bachelor of Laws (LLB Hons.)
- Master of Laws (LLM)

=== Faculty of Arts & Humanities ===
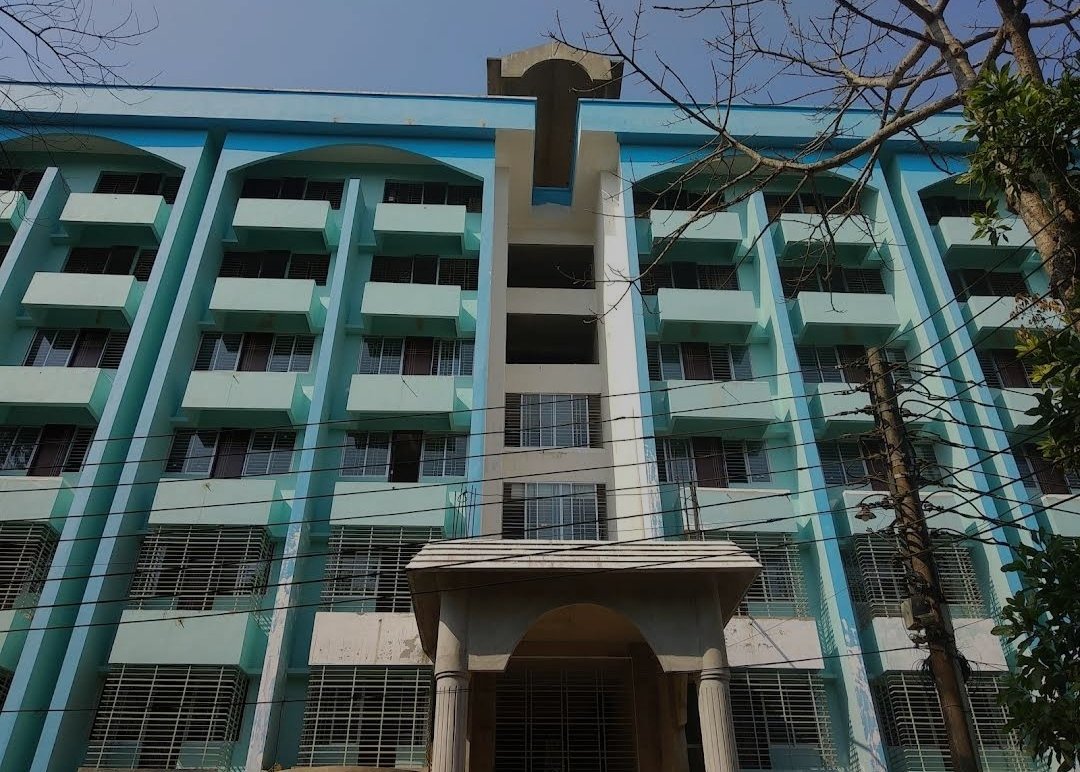
- Academic Building 5

English Language and Literature (ELL): Master of Arts in English Language and Literature, Masters of Arts in English Language Teaching (ELT),

- Bachelor of Arts (Hons.) in English Language and Literature

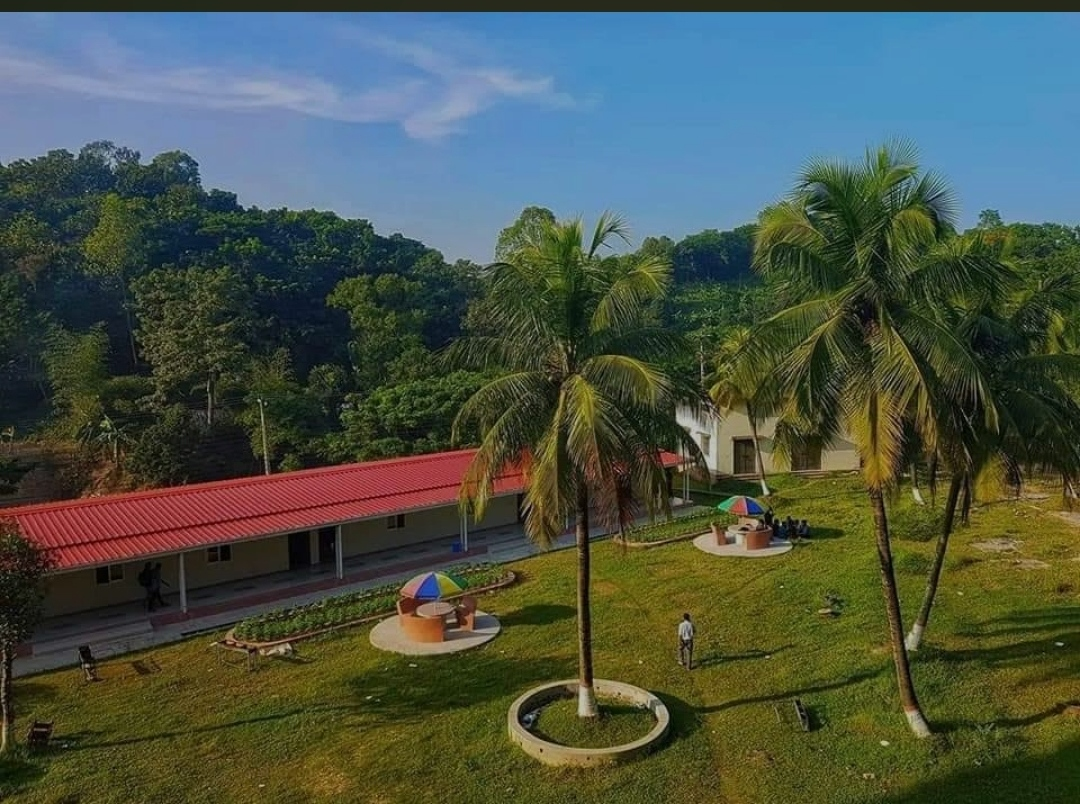
Department of Arabic Language and Literature

- Arabic Language and Literature (ALL), Bachelor of Arts (Hons.) in Arabic Language and Literature

=== Faculty of Social Sciences ===
==== Department of Economics & Banking ====
- BSS (Hons) in Economics & Banking (EB)
- MSS in Economics & Banking (EB)

==== Department of Library & Information Science ====
- Post Graduate Diploma in Library & Information Sciences (PGDLIS)

=== Faculty of Shari'ah & Islamic Studies ===
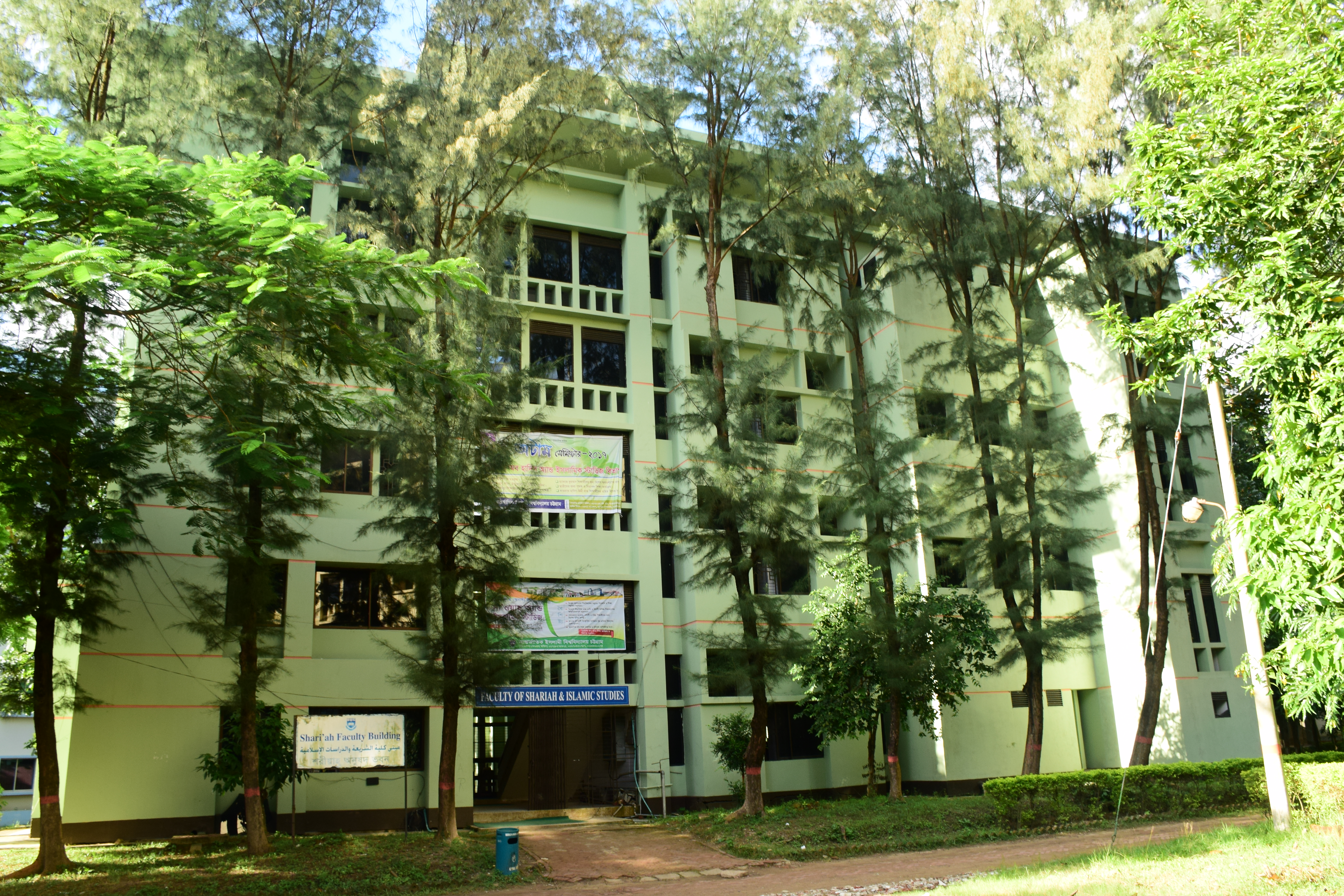
Faculty Of Shariah and Islamic Studies

- Bachelor of Arts (Hons.) in Qur'anic Sciences and Islamic Studies (QSIS)
- Master of Arts in Qura'nic Sciences and Islamic Studies (MQSIS)
- Bachelor of Arts (Hons.) in Da'wah and Islamic Studies (DIS)
- Master of Arts in Da'wah and Islamic Studies (MDIS)
- Bachelor of Arts (Hons.) in Sciences of Hadith and Islamic Studies (SHIS)
- Master of Arts in Sciences of Hadith and Islamic Studies (MSHIS)

== Library and Information Division ==
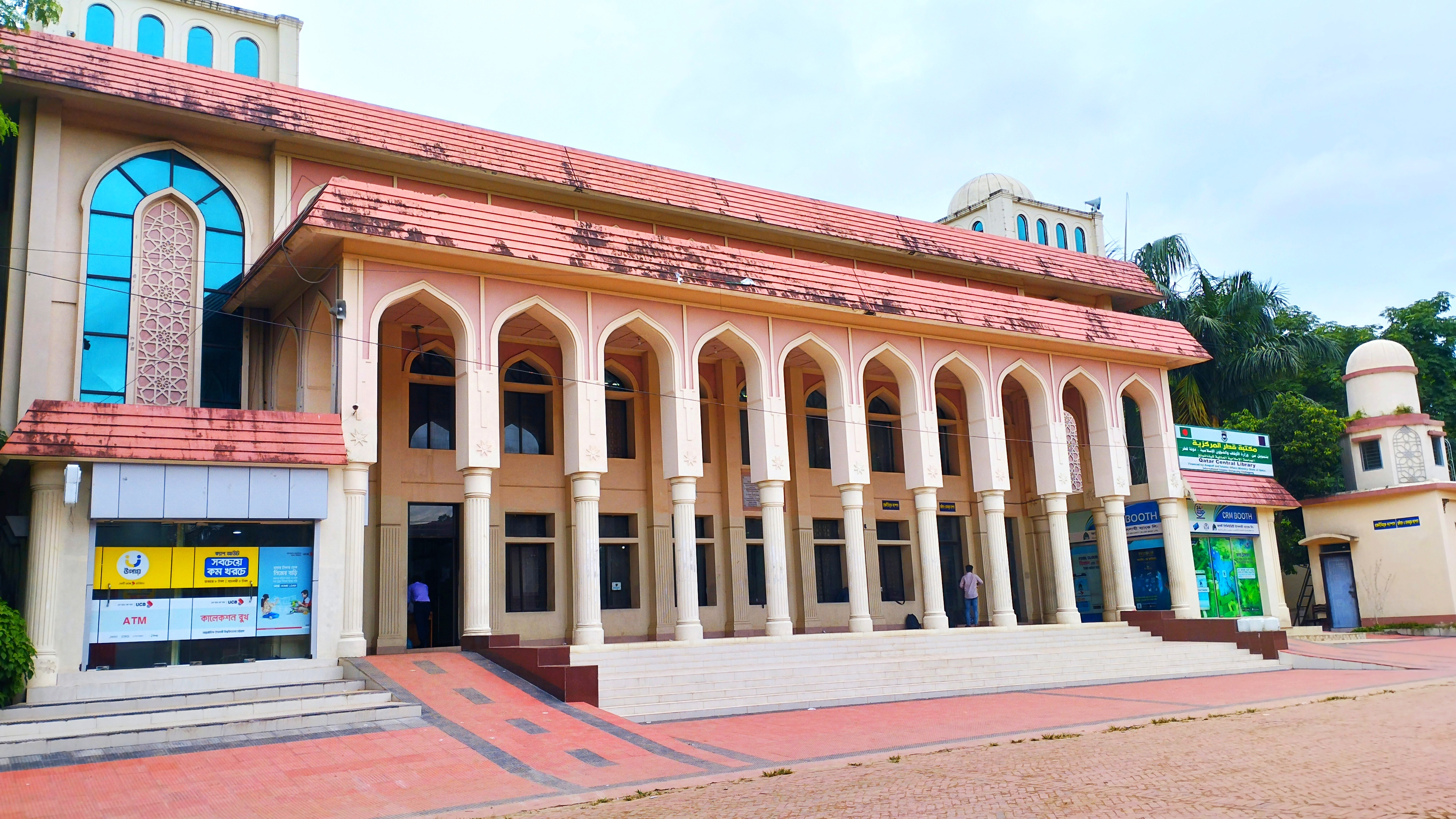
IIUC central library

There are seven libraries in IIUC, listed here with area information and number of books:

Sl. No.	Library name	Space (sq ft)
1	Central Library, Permanent Campus, Kumira	33,000
2	ELL Seminar Library, Chittagong	1,000
3	DBA Seminar Library, Chittagong	3,500
Total		37,500

Sl. No.	Faculties	Titles	Copies
1	Faculty of Shari’ah	4,972	22,666
2	Faculty of Science & Engineering	908	23,909
3	Faculty of Administrative Science	827	22,690
4	Faculty of Health Science	157	803
5	Faculty of Arts & Humanities	750	5,736
6	Faculty of Law	560	2,907
7	Faculty of Social Sciences and Others	230	3,932
Total		8,404	82,643

== Accreditation ==
IIUC is graded by a team constituted by the prime minister in 2004 headed by the chairman of UGC for evaluating the standard and quality of existing 57 private universities. IIUC is the first private university which has been accredited by the Board of Accreditation for Engineering and Technical Education (BAETE) for fulfilling all requirements in its CSE, EEE and CCE programs. It is the first private university in Bangladesh accredited by BAETE.

== Hostel facilities ==
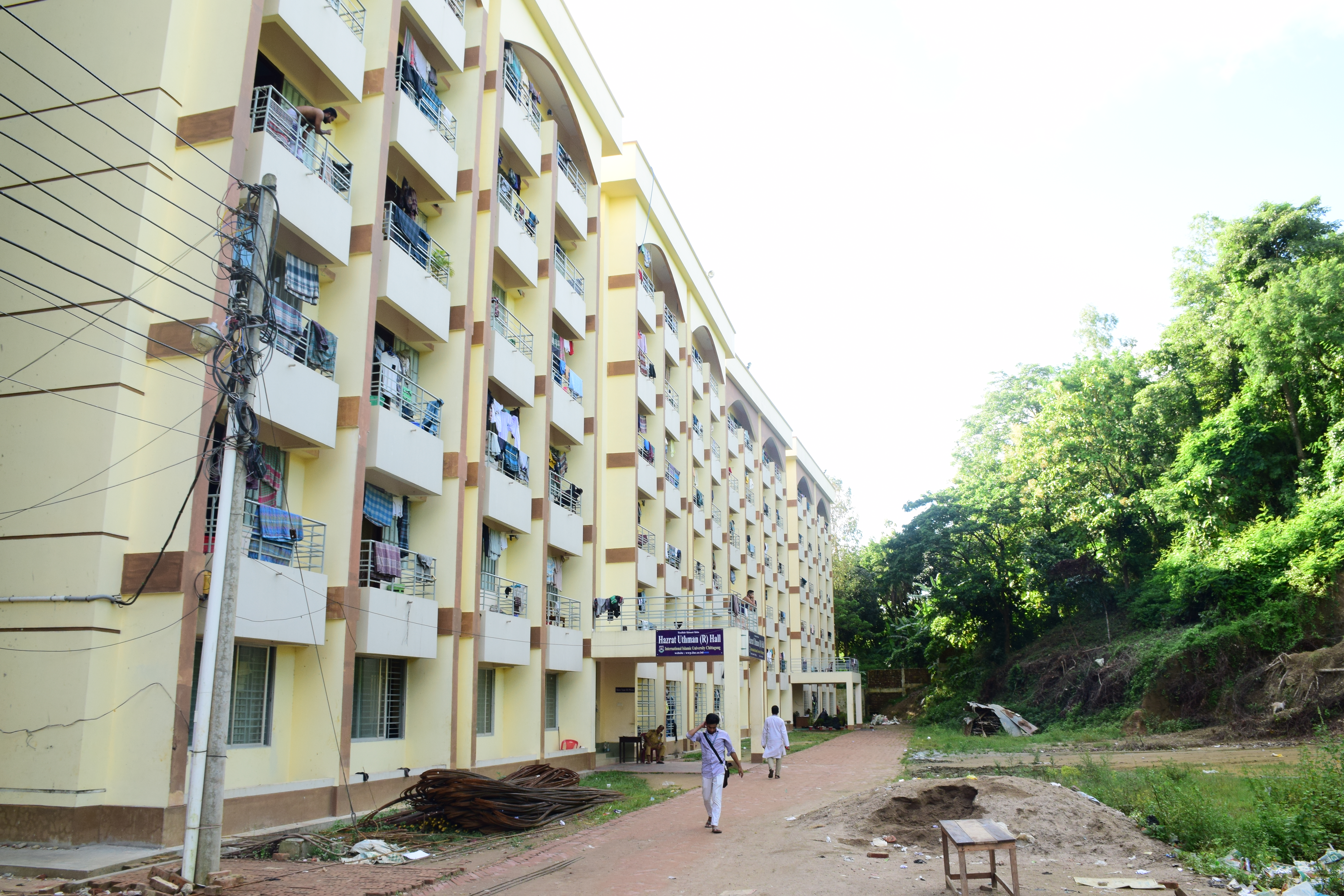
Hazrat Uthman (R) hall (Male Hall)

Limited hostel accommodation are available for male & female students.

== Scholarships ==
IIUC offers scholarships in each semester. Full-time teachers are studying abroad for higher degrees with an IIUC scholarship. Current faculty or students are provided with a scholarship for higher study in home or abroad.

== University Clubs & Societies ==
1. IEEE IIUC Student Branch
2. IIUC Computer Club
3. IIUC EEE Club
4. IIUC Pharma Club
5. IIUC Competitive Programming Society
6. English Language and Literary Society -ELLS
7. IIUC BUSINESS CLUB
8. IIUC LAW CLUB
9. IIUC ETE Club
10. IIUC Civil Engineering Club
11. IEEE IIUC Student Branch
12. IIUC EB CLUB
13. CCE CLUB, IIUC
14. IIUC Da'wah Club
15. IIUC Hadith Club
16. IIUC Qur'anic Sciences Club
17. Arabic Club
18. IIUC MODEL UN CLUB
19. IIUC Debaters Community
20. IIUC Photography Society

== Foreign collaboration ==
IIUC has signed for formal academic collaboration Memoranda of Understanding (MoU). Under these agreements, students of IIUC are able to transfer their credits to several universities and institutions.

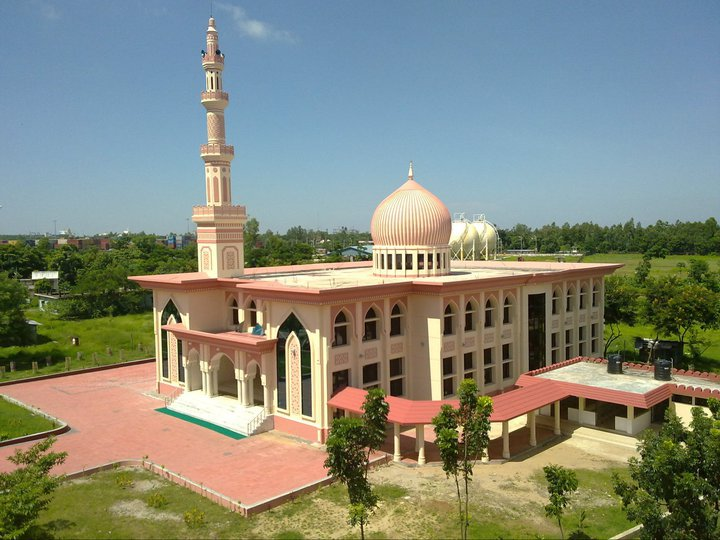
Central Mosque

== Events ==
IIUC has organized events such as the IEEE Conference, National Computer Programming Contest, Inter-university Programming Contest, Intra-university Programming Contest, IT Festival, Job Fair, Dynamic Leadership Training Camp, Poem Recitation Workshop, Annual Cultural festival, Programming Workshop, Open Source Workshop, and hardware and software fairs.

In August 2007 it organized Open Source Campaign-5 which was a step towards open source awareness in Chittagong and in Bangladesh. It ran from 31 August to 1 September 2007. It mainly focused on open source and its features, flexibility and its opportunities in Bangladesh and the whole world. Recently IEEE Day 2023 was celebrated at IIUC.

== Gallery ==
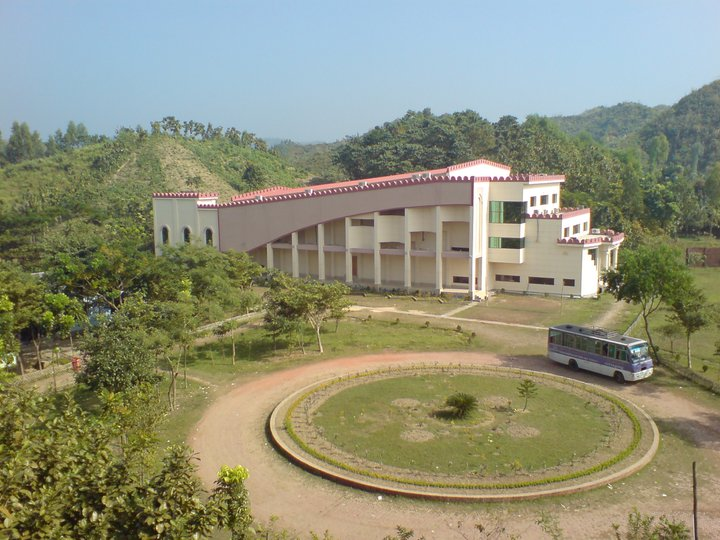

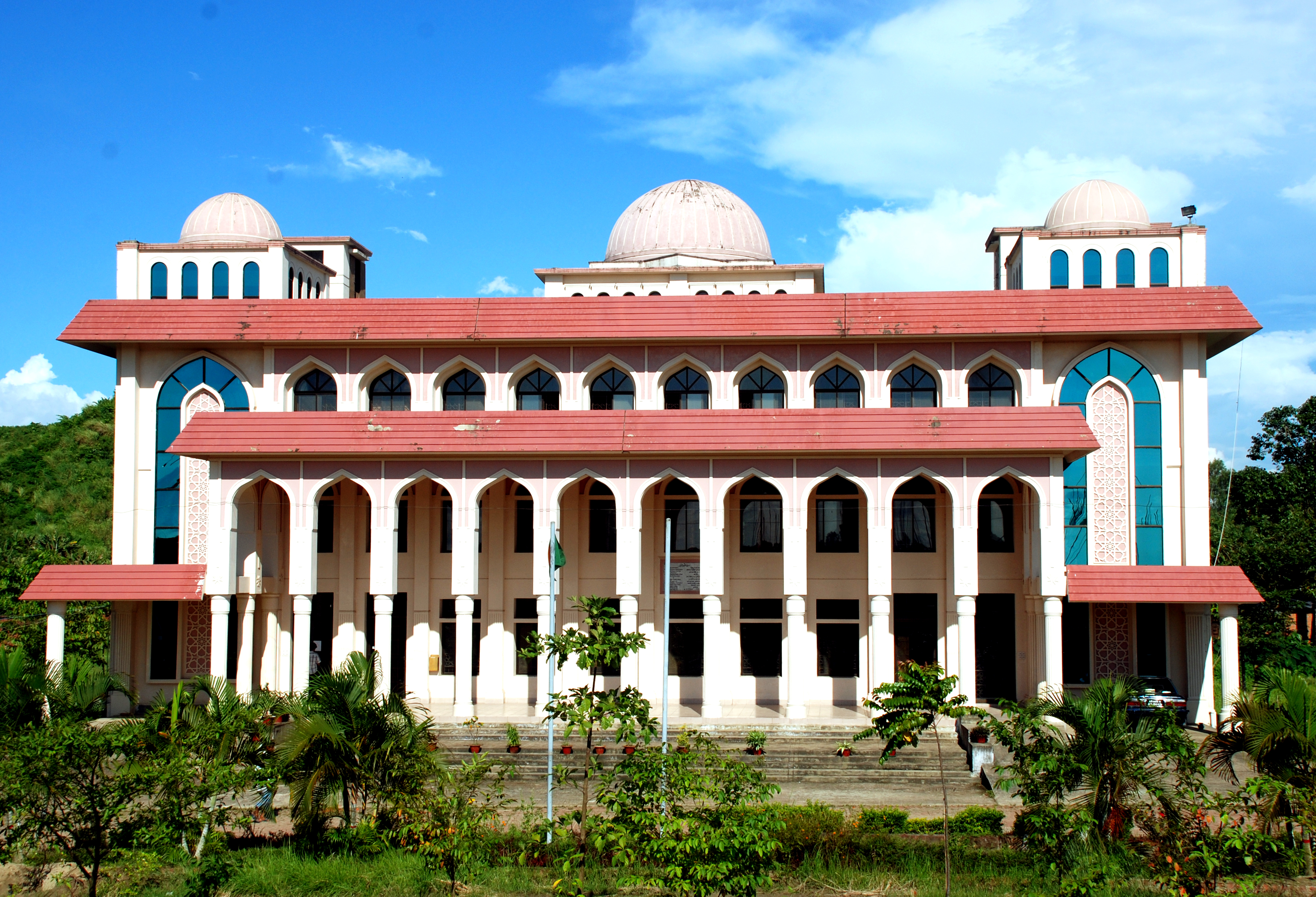

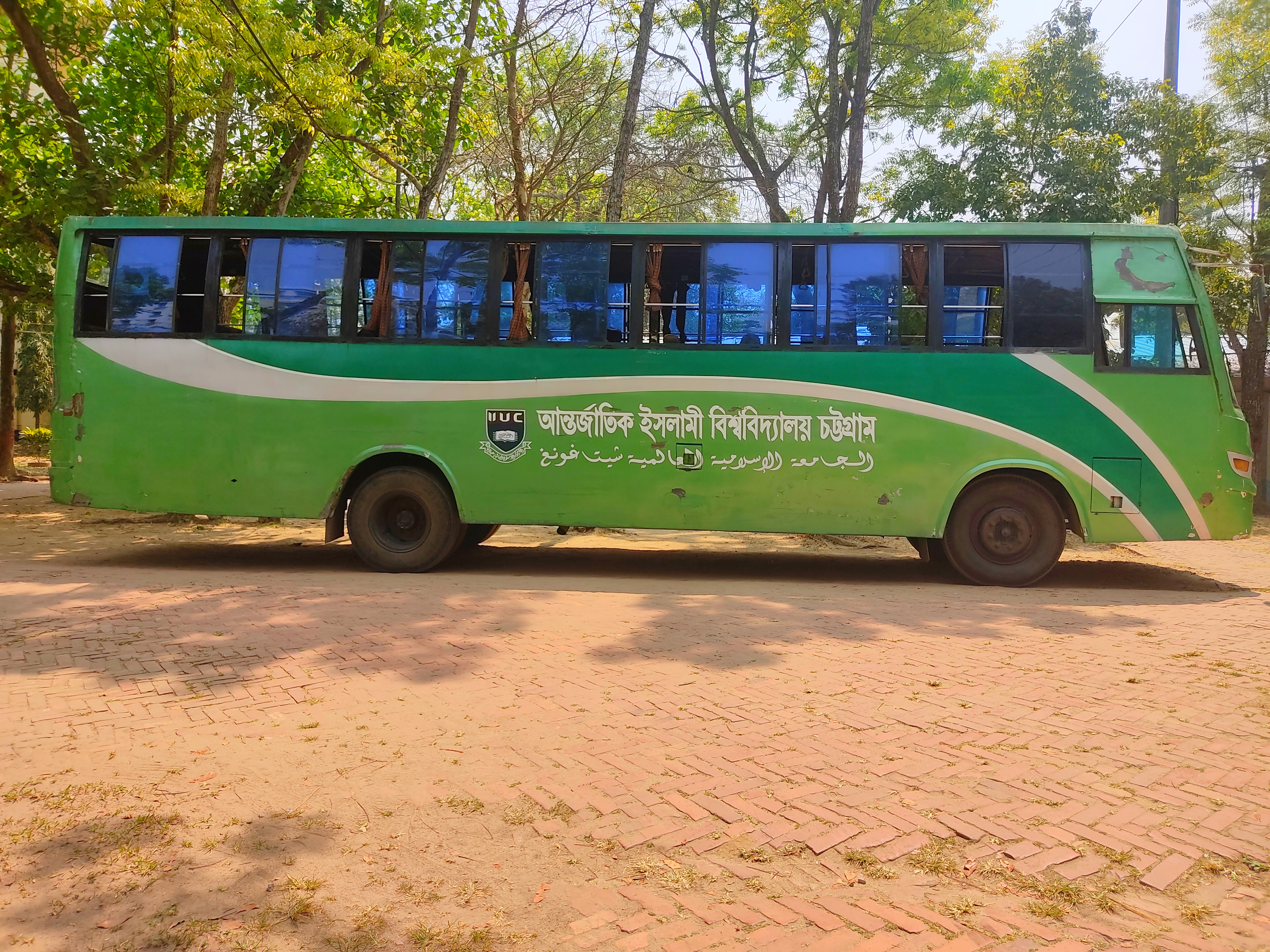

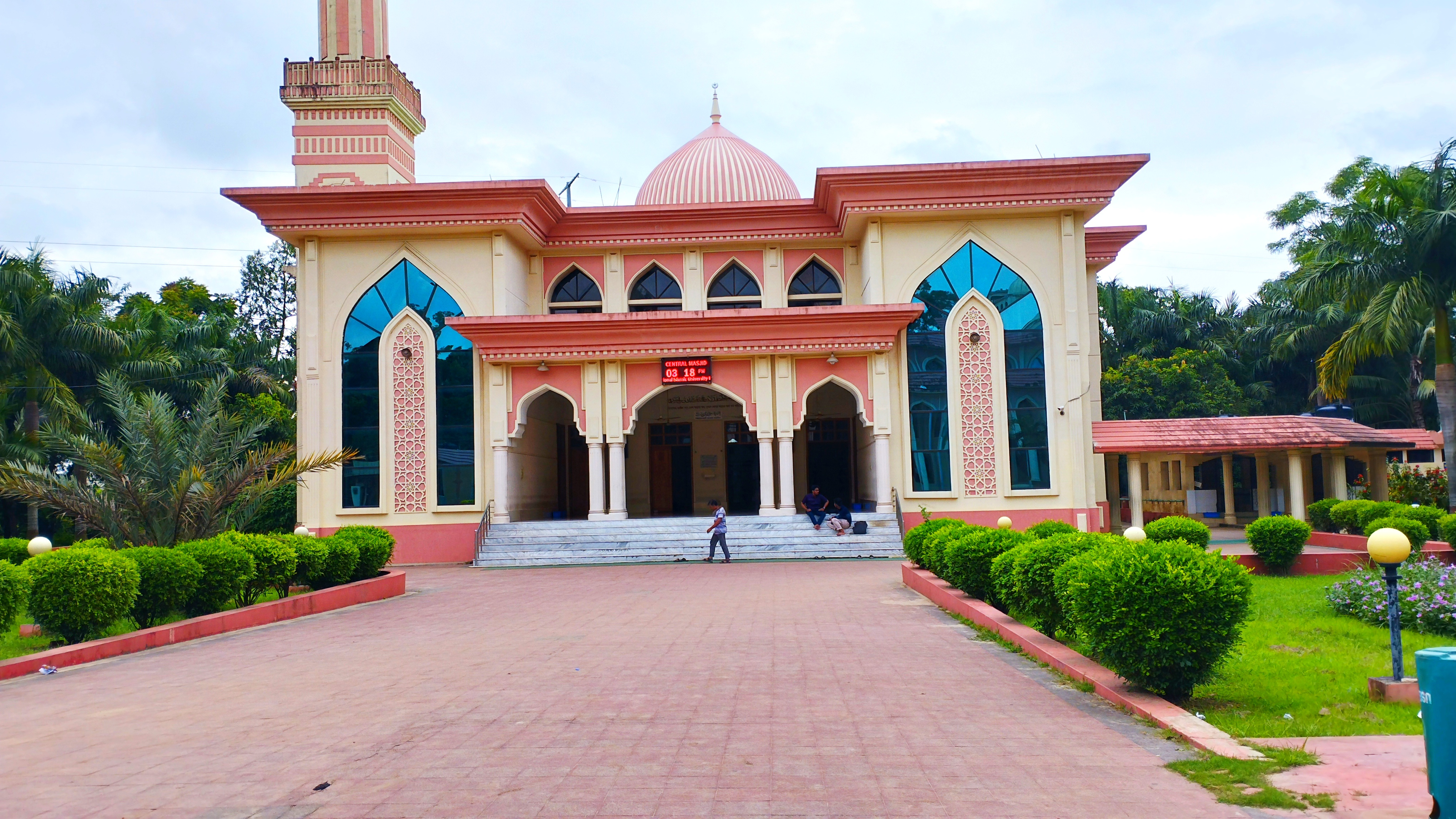

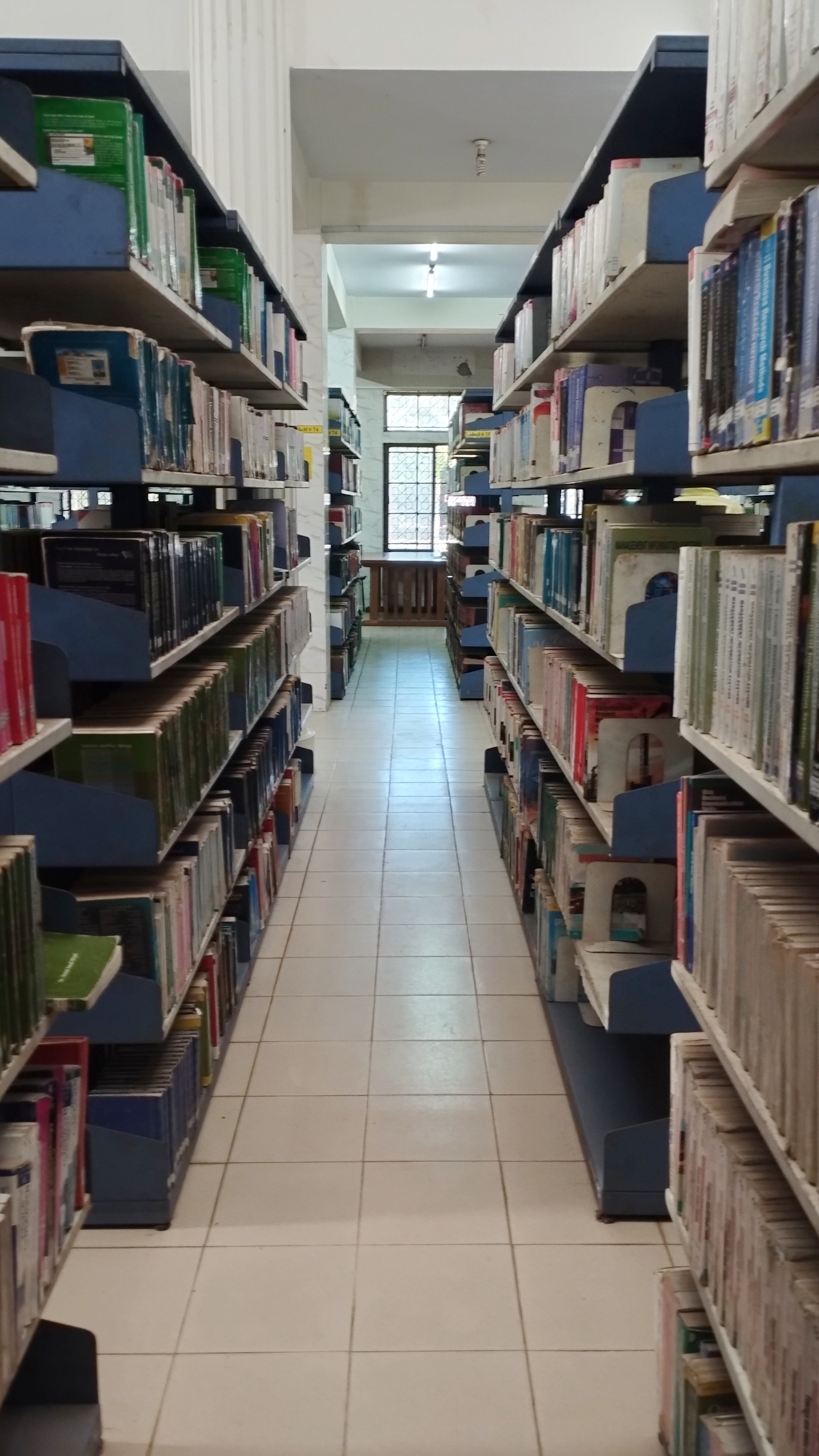

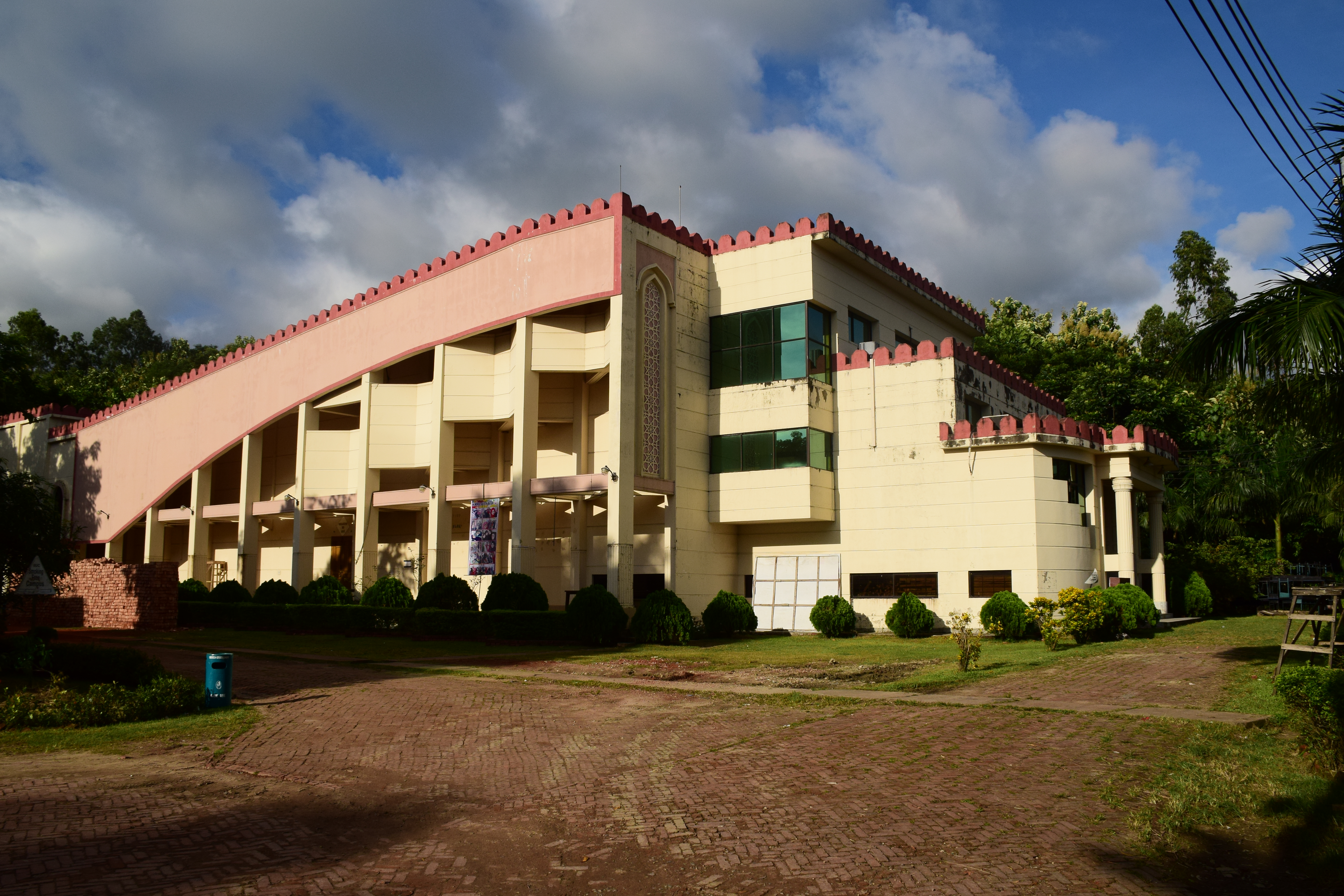

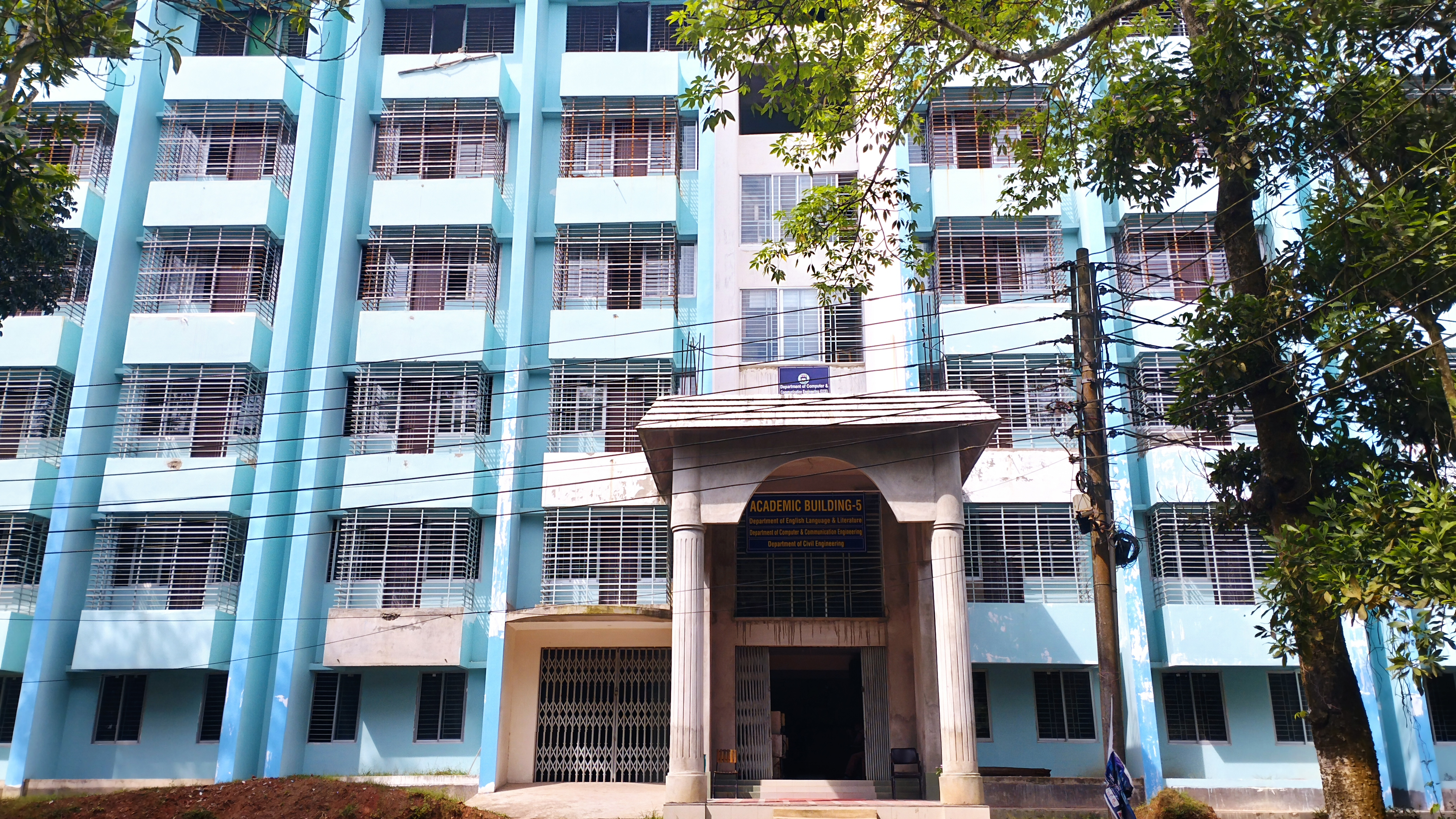

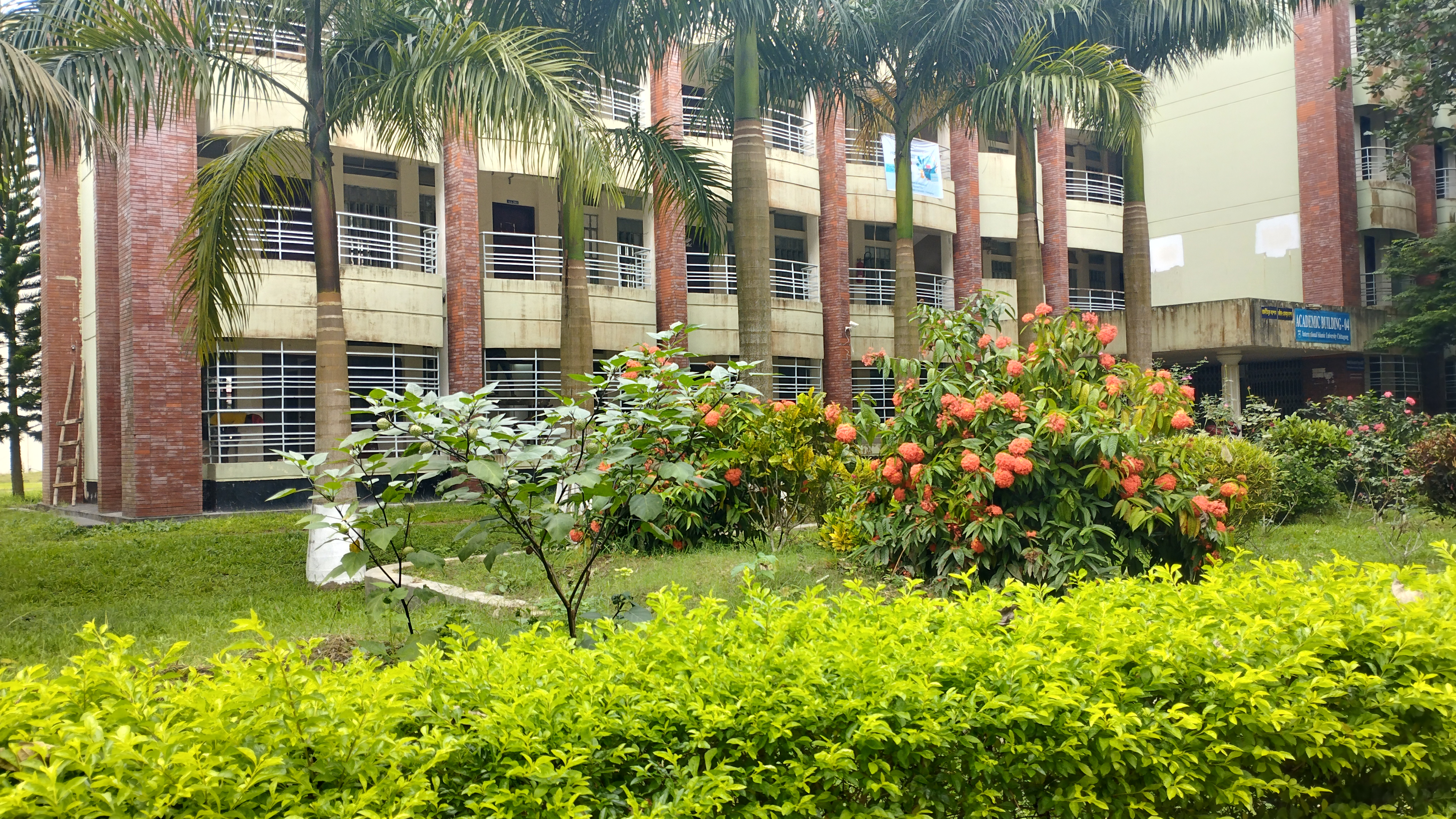

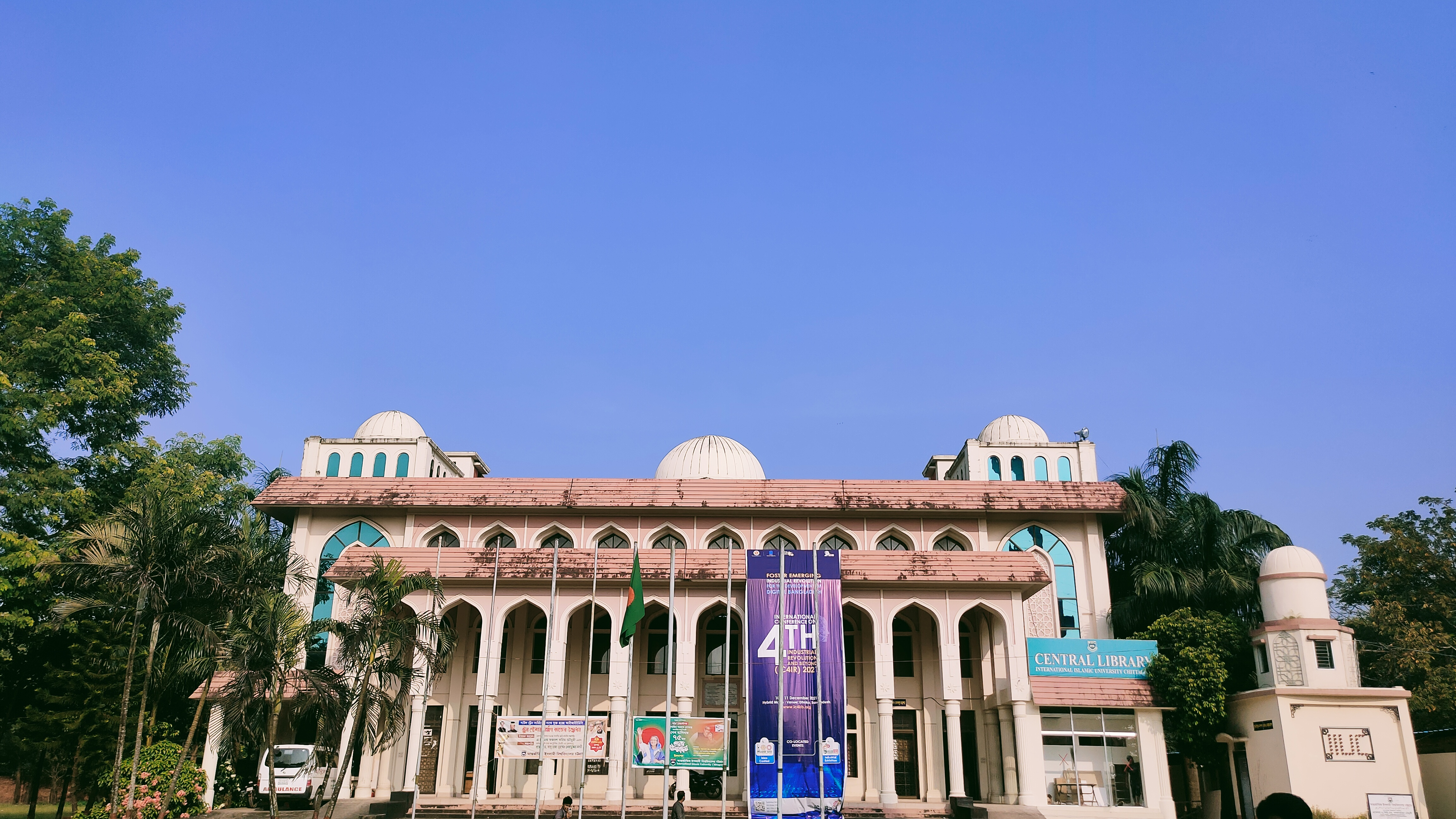

== See also ==
- List of Islamic educational institutions
