= First Security Islami Bank PLC =

Bangladeshi bank

First Security Islami Bank PLC.
- Type: Public Limited Company
- Traded as: DSE: FIRSTSBANK; CSE: FIRSTSBANK
- Industry: Banking
- Founded: Dhaka, Bangladesh
- Headquarters: Dhaka, Bangladesh
- Products: Banking services Consumer Banking; Corporate Banking; Investment Banking
- Number of employees: 4100+ (2023)
- Website: fsibplc.com

First Security Islami Bank PLC. (Bengali: ফার্স্ট সিকিউরিটি ইসলামী ব্যাংক পিএলসি.) is a public limited bank in Bangladesh which was founded on 29 August 1999 and provides sharia-compliant banking. Mohammed Saiful Alam, chairman of S. Alam Group of Industries, was the chairman of First Security Islami Bank Limited. The bank experienced a cash crunch in 2022 after approving large unsecured loans. The Bangladesh Bank on September 1, 2024, dissolved the board of First Security Islami Bank PLC, which was under the control of controversial S Alam Group, and appointed independent directors to the bank board.

== History ==
First Security Islami Bank Limited was incorporated on 29 August 1999 as a commercial bank. It started operations on 25 October 1999 with an authorized capital of 1 billion taka.

From 2009, the bank started sharia banking.

Bangladesh Sports Press Association (BSPA) in 2014 awarded the bank best sponsor. The Bank sponsored the National School Hockey Tournament.

The Bank saw profits decline in 2018 along with other listed banks on the Dhaka Stock Exchange.

In September 2021, First Security Islami Bank Limited issued shares to raise its paid up capital. It declared a 10 per cent dividend that year.

On 4 December 2022, Bangladesh High Court ordered Criminal Investigation Department, Bangladesh Financial Intelligence Unit, Bangladesh Bank, and Anti-Corruption Commission to investigate Social Islami Bank Limited, Islami Bank Bangladesh Limited, and First Security Islami Bank Limited. The chairman of S. Alam Group, Mohammed Saiful Alam, is chairman of the First Security Islami Bank Limited while his group controls Social Islami Bank Limited, and Islami Bank Bangladesh Limited. According to Ahsan H Mansur, director of Policy Research Institute of Bangladesh, told The Daily Star that S. Alam Group had taken 800 billion BDT from Banks controlled by S. Alam Group. On 13 December, Bangladesh Bank appointed observers at Islami Bank Bangladesh and First Security Islami Bank. On 29 December, Social Islami Bank Limited, Global Islami Bank, First Security Islami Bank Limited, and Union Bank took loans of 67 billion BDT from Bangladesh Bank in emergency cash infusion. Before them, Islamic Bank Bangladesh took 80 billion BDT in emergency loans from Bangladesh Bank. Bangladesh Bank imposed restricts on the five banks providing major loans. S. Alam Group filed a Digital Security Act case against an executive of Golden Life Insurance who posted posters and social media posts accusing the group of embezzling money from their own banks including First Security Islami Bank Limited.

== Charity ==
The bank provides scholarships for meritorious students through its corporate social responsibility. The bank has established a charity hospital and school.

== Subsidiaries ==
- First Security Islami Capital and Investment Limited
