= S. Alam Group of Industries =

Bangladeshi industrial conglomerate

S.Alam Group
- Type: Private
- Industry: Conglomerate
- Founded: 1985; 41 years ago
- Founder: Mohammad S. Alam Masud Chowdhury (Chairman)
- Headquarters: 2119, Asadgonj, Chittagong, Bangladesh
- Key people: Muhammad Saiful Alam Masud Chowdhury
- Products: Food & allied products, cement, steel, power & energy, transportation, shipping, manufacturing, properties, agro, trading
- Total equity: 140 billion BDT (1.3 billion USD)
- Number of employees: 20,000
- Website: www.s.alamgroupbd.com

S. Alam Group (Bengali: এস.আলম গ্রুপ) is a Bangladeshi industrial conglomerate. The group has been operating for 40 years, and currently employs over 20,000 across Bangladesh. It maintains investments in industrial manufacturing, food products, and energy production and provides materials utilised for Bangladesh's economic growth and activity, including cement and steel.

The group is under investigation by the Government of Bangladesh for alleged financial misdeeds. In December 2024, S.Alam Group issued a notice of dispute to the Interim Government of Bangladesh for the unlawful harming of assets by the Bangladesh Bank and other authorities.

== History ==
The group was founded in 1985 by industrialist and philanthropist Mohammed Saiful Alam. Today, Mr Alam oversees a diversified portfolio of over 200 companies supporting the economic security of Bangladesh across three main divisions: finance, industrial operations and manufacturing, and commercial services and trading.

The group is best known in Bangladesh for providing the country with many of its daily foodstuffs including vegetable oil and refined sugar.

=== Banking involvement ===
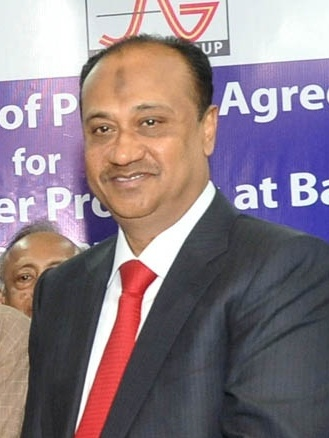
Mohammed Saiful Alam Masud, chairman of the group, has been accused of embezzlement of $234 billions from different banks.

In April 2009, S. Alam purchased Oman Bangladesh Leasing and Finance Limited. Md Saiful Alam Masud, chairman of S. Alam Group and First Security Islami Bank Limited, was appointed chairman of Oman Bangladesh Leasing and Finance Limited.

The takeover of Islami Bank (IBBL) started in 2013 and was supported by the Awami League government given the bank's links to the Bangladesh Jamaat-e-Islami and Jamaatul Mujaideen. These changes were the result of a 2012 report by the US Senate's Homeland Security and Governmental Affairs Committee that drew from internal HSBC documents noting that IBBL had engaged in "suspicious transactions" and that the leader of the banned Jamaatul Mujahideen of Bangladesh, Abdur Rahman, had kept an account at Islami Bank. To address these issues, the Bangladeshi government overhauled IBBL's leadership in 2017; four board directors were replaced and a government observer put on.

The same year the company took over Islami Bank Bangladesh Ltd and appointed Arastoo Khan chairman. The bank then initiated widespread reforms, reconstituting the board and management, shifting away from alignment with a particular political or ideological group, and restructuring recruitment to encourage diversity. By 2020, IBBL was one of the leading conduits for remittances, handling over 30% of Bangladesh's total inflows.

In 2017, S.Alam Group bought a 50 percent of the shares of Social Islami Bank Limited through 19 subsidiaries, which ran counter to the Banking Company Act, 1991 which maintains that an individual or company cannot hold more than 5% shares of a bank by itself without approval of the central bank.

In January 2023, S. Alam Group owned Islami Bank Bangladesh Ltd received 80 billion taka in emergency funds from Bangladesh Bank.

=== Other industries ===
S. Alam Group signed an agreement with SEPCO3 to construct a powerplant in Chittagong in 2013. The powerplant has a capacity of 1,320 MW and has been operational since 2023. Initially the project faced opposition from the Banshkhali power plant movement which was launched to stop the construction of the power plant. Environmentalists opposed the construction of the plant on environmental grounds.

On 25 November 2015, a media release issued by Ekushey Television stated that S. Alam Group of Industries had acquired Ekushey, in an auction on 8 October.

In October 2018, S. Alam group purchased 45 per cent of the shares of Padma Islami Life Insurance Company. The group has made significant investments in Singapore. It purchased 20 ships from Western Marine Shipyard for 2.5 billion taka.

The company launched a satellite television channel, Nexus Television, in July 2021.

=== Philanthropy ===
S.Alam Group has also engaged in several philanthropic initiatives in Bangladesh, with a focus on the education sector by directly contributing to the establishment of universities, colleges, and schools.

In April 2020, amid the COVID-19 pandemic, the group supplied medical equipment and support to hospitals including ICU ventilators, high-flow nasal cannulas (oxygen support) and distributed 2,000 pieces of Personal Protective Equipment for doctors, nurses, and all health assistants to all hospitals under Chattogram City Corporation.

=== Dispute with the interim government of Bangladesh ===
Following the resignation of Prime Minister Sheikh Hasina in August 2024, the interim government under Muhammad Yunus started investigating alleged financial misdeeds of S. Alam Group, Beximco Group, Nabil Group, Summit Group, Orion Group, Gemcon Group, NASSA Group, Bashundhara Group, Sikder Group, and Aramit Group.

On December 18, 2024, Mohammed Saiful Alam, chairman of S. Alam Group, issued a formal notice to Bangladesh's interim government, threatening international arbitration under the 2004 Bangladesh-Singapore Bilateral Investment Treaty (BIT). Alam, who along with his family acquired Singaporean citizenship in 2022 after renouncing Bangladeshi nationality in 2020, alleges that the government's actions have unlawfully harmed their investment.

Key Allegations

- Asset Freezing and Travel Bans: The Alam family allege that the interim government froze the family's bank accounts and imposed travel restrictions without due process.
- Corporate Disruption: S. Alam-owned banks faced lending restrictions, management overhauls, and cancellation of business deals, described as having been done "arbitrarily and without due process".
- Investigations without notice: The family allege that they were subjected to money laundering investigations without formal notification.

Alam's legal team, Quinn Emanuel Urquhart & Sullivan, contends that these measures have destroyed the value of their investments and violated protections afforded under the BIT and Bangladeshi law. They have given the government six months to resolve the dispute amicably, failing which they will initiate international arbitration proceedings.

== Criticism ==
According to New Age, S. Alam Group had taken 300 billion taka loans from Islami Bank Bangladesh Ltd which was denied by the bank. The Minister of Finance, Abul Maal Abdul Muhith, announced an investigation of loans of the group. He believed the group was using loans from other banks for the takeover. According to Ahsan H Mansur, director of Policy Research Institute of Bangladesh, the group has taken 800 billion taka loans from various banks through its subsidiaries.

On April 17, 2021, five workers at Banshkhali power plant were killed by police firing bullets at protesting workers demanding payment of dues and breaks for prayer and iftar during Ramadan. Their ages ranged from 18 to 25. More than 20 other workers were also injured. The company filed a case against a local engineer under the Digital Security Act. Bangladesh High Court ordered S. Alam Group to pay 500 thousand taka to each of those workers killed in the police action.

Directorate of Consumers' Rights Protection had found S. Alam stopped production of edible oil during shortages hiking up price of oil in the market. In December 2022, Prime Minister Sheikh Hasina called for an investigation into S. Alam Group according to The Daily Star. The Prime Minister's Office denied the prime minister issued the order. Justices Md Nazrul Islam Talukder and Khizir Hayat of the High Court Division ordered an investigation into the S. Alam Group owned banks of Social Islami Bank Limited, First Security Islami Bank, and Islami Bank Bangladesh Ltd. Bangladesh Bank provided additional funding to five S. Alam Group owned banks, First Security Islami Bank, Global Islamic Bank, Islami Bank Bangladesh, Social Islami Bank, and Union Bank. In 2022, it was one of five Bangladeshi groups that imported more than one billion dollar worth of raw materials; the others were Abul Khair Group, Bashundhara Group, BSRM, and Meghna Group of Industries.

SS Power Limited, a concern of S Alam Group, allegedly laundered $815.78 million (around Tk 10,000 crore) from Bangladesh between 2019 and 2023 through misuse of two Letters of Credit (LCs) meant for importing capital machinery for a 1320MW coal-based power plant in Chattogram. Despite opening the LCs to import items such as boiler structures, generators, and transformers, no equipment ever entered Bangladesh. However, the funds were still transferred out of the country, with Bangladesh Bank approving payments to SS Power's Chinese partner, SEPCO, based on fake invoices and fabricated documents. An investigation by The Daily Star revealed that 184 fraudulent invoices were uploaded on the Bangladesh Bank server via Rupali Bank, which managed the LCs. These invoices included future dates, unrelated Import Permissions (IPs), and even documents tied to exports, not imports. Of these, 88 invoices were linked to 50 companies that had no connection with SS Power or SEPCO. Even though Chattogram Customs found no import records for these transactions, payments were still processed. Further investigation showed that Rupali Bank uploaded the fraudulent data despite there being no actual imports, pointing to the involvement of high-level bank officials. While SS Power's CFO denied wrongdoing, Rupali Bank confirmed the transfer of $815.78 million. This scandal highlights serious gaps in the financial oversight mechanisms of Bangladesh, with both customs and banking authorities failing to prevent the capital flight. Bangladesh Bank and other authorities have yet to take decisive action, although they have acknowledged the evidence brought forward.

In December 2024, S. Alam Group issued a notice of arbitration to the Government of Bangladesh to recover losses that it claims after the group's assets were frozen.

=== Hostile takeover of Ekushey Television ===
On 5 January 2015, Ekushey Television broadcast a live speech of BNP senior vice-chairman Tarique Rahman during the 2015 Bangladeshi political crisis. ETV's chairman, Abdus Salam, was arrested the next day on pornography charges, which the Committee to Protect Journalists stated was a guise, the real reason being the broadcasting of Tarique Rahman's speech. Abdus Salam was later jailed on charges of sedition, a case in which Tarique Rahman was co-accused. On 25 November 2015, S. Alam group took over ETV in a hostile takeover ordered by then Prime Minister Sheikh Hasina. The takeover was overseen by the DGFI. The officers responsible were then DGFI chief Lt. Gen. Akbar Hossain, former NTMC chief Maj. Gen. (dismissed) Ziaul Ahsan, Commander M. Sohail, and Lt. Col. Rashed Alam. After the hostile takeover, Awami League leader and Sheikh Hasina's former assistant, Abdus Sobhan Golap, was made the managing director of ETV.

On 5th August 2024, Sheikh Hasina's government was overthrown by the July Revolution. Abdus Salam returned to the ETV office after 9 years and retook control of channel. The S. Alam Group appointed employees were terminated and all the old employees were recalled. Abdus Salam revealed that the DGFI made him an offer where he would be released from prison and allowed to leave for Germany in exchange for the sale of his shares to S. Alam Group. After his refusal, he was kept in prison for more than 2 years while new shares were illegally issued in the name of S. Alam Group, making them the majority shareholder.

== Subsidiary companies ==
=== Cement ===
- S. Alam Cement Ltd.
- Portland Cements Ltd.

=== Food and allied products ===
- S. Alam Soya Seed Extraction Plant Ltd.
- S. Alam Vegetable Oil Limited.
- S. Alam Super Edible Oil Limited.
- S. Alam Refined Sugar Industries Ltd.
- S. Alam Refined Sugar Industries Ltd. (Unit-2)
- S. Alam Tank Terminal Ltd.

=== Manufacturing ===
- S. Alam Bag Manufacturing Mills Ltd.
- Silver Food Industries Limited

=== Media ===
- Ekushey Television (2015—2024)

=== Power and energy ===
- Karnaphuli Prakritik Gas Co. Ltd.
- Shah Amanat Prakritik Gas Co. Ltd.
- S. Alam Power Plant Ltd.
- S. Alam Power Plant ltd. (Unit-2)
- S. Alam Power Generation Ltd.
- SS Power 1 Ltd, Gondamara, Baskhali (660 MW Coal Power Plant).
- SS Power 2 Ltd, Gondamara, Baskhali (660 MW Coal Power Plant).

=== Properties ===
- S. Alam Properties Ltd.
- Hasan Abason (Pvt.) Ltd.
- Modern Properties Ltd.
- Ocean Resorts Ltd.
- Prasad Paradise Ltd.
- Marine Empire
- Fatehabad Farm Ltd

=== Shipping ===
- Bering Sea Lines

Evergreen shipping ltd

=== Steel ===
- S. Alam Steels Ltd.
- S. Alam Cold Rolled Steels Ltd.
- S. Alam Cold Rolled Steels Ltd. (Unit-2)
- Galco Steels (BD) Ltd.
- Galco Steels (BD) Ltd. (Unit-2)

=== Trading ===
- S. Alam Brothers Ltd.
- S. Alam Trading Co. (Pvt.) Ltd.
- S. Alam & Company
- Sonali Cargo Logistics (Pvt.) Ltd.
- Sonali Traders
- Global Trading Cor. Ltd.

=== Transportation ===
- S. Alam Luxury Chair Coach Services Ltd.

== Banks and financial institutions ==
- Islami Bank Bangladesh Limited
- First Security Islami Bank
- Union Bank Limited
- Global Islami Bank (formerly NRB global bank limited)
- Social Islami Bank Limited
- Aviva Finance (previously Reliance Finance)
- Reliance Brokerage Services Limited

== See also ==
- List of companies of Bangladesh
