= Hire Purchase under Shirkatul Melk =

Hire Purchase under Shirkatul Melk (HPSM) is a type of hire purchase contract which has been developed through practice and approved in Shariah. The term is used in Islamic banking. It is a synthesis of three contracts: shirkat, ijarah and sale. Under this mode, banks supply goods on rental basis. Ownership of the goods lies jointly between the bank and the client jointly; the client makes payments in installments, with the balance owned by the bank as mortgage. In the meantime, the client is authorized to possess and use the goods. Once all the installments have been paid, the goods become the client's property alone.

== See also ==
- Sukuk
- Islamic financial system
