= Union Bank (Bangladesh) =

Bank of Bangladesh

Union Bank PLC.
- Type: PLC
- Industry: Banking
- Founded: 7 March 2013
- Headquarters: Dhaka, Bangladesh
- Area served: Bangladesh
- Key people: Md. Fariduddin Ahmed (Chairman); Mohd. Humayun Kabir (MD)
- Services: Banking; Financial services
- Website: www.unionbank.com.bd

Union Bank PLC. is a fourth-generation private Islamic bank in Bangladesh. It is listed on the Dhaka Stock Exchange.

== History ==
Union Bank PLC was established on 7 March 2013 as a sharia-compliant bank. It signed an agreement to use products of Millennium Information Solution .

On 8 January 2017, Islami Bank Bangladesh Ltd appointed Md Abdul Hamid Miah, former managing director of Union Bank, as managing director. This happened at a time Islami Bank Bangladesh Ltd saw major changes in ownership with companies aligned with S. Alam Group of Industries were allegedly buying up stakes in Islami Bank. The chairman of Union Bank at that time Shahidul Alam is a director of S Alam Group and brother of the chairman of S Alam Group, Mohammad Saiful Alam Masud Chowdhury.

ABM Mokammel Hoque Chowdhury was appointed managing director of Union Bank PLC on 22 April 2020 from additional managing director.

On 5 September 2021, Bangladesh Securities and Exchange Commission approved the Union Bank PLC plan to go for IPO. Union Bank 4.28 billion taka from the stock market which would make it the fourth largest IPO in the history of Bangladesh and the largest for the banking sector in the country.

On 23 September 2021, an inspection by Bangladesh Bank found that the bank overstated the cash in its vault of Gulshan branch by 190 million out of a total of 310 million taka. Deputy managing director of Union Bank PLC, Hasan Iqbal, said that the missing cash was given to a "VIP client" after regular hours. The bank suspended three of its officials after the discovery was made. Bangladesh Bank did not take any punitive action against Union Bank PLC for the mismatch of funds in its Gulshan Branch despite it being a violation of Banking rules. It has sent a letter to Union Bank seeking an explanation for the mismatch.

Union Bank planned to release shares on the Dhaka Stock Exchange on 26 January 2022. BRAC EPL Investments Limited and Prime Bank Investment Limited were the issue managers of the bank. On 30 June 2022, an investigation by Bangladesh Bank found that the Bank had provided majority of its loans to 300 companies that exist only on paper and some of whom are not even registered as businesses in Bangladesh.

=== Loan Management and Risk Exposure ===
In its revised financial report for 2023, Union Bank PLC revealed major discrepancies compared to its previously audited accounts. The revised report showed a loss of 2.92 billion taka, whereas the earlier report had declared a profit of 1.62 billion taka. As a result, the previously announced 5% cash dividend was cancelled. The auditing firm M. M. Rahman & Co. conducted a re-audit and corrected the report.

According to the bank’s management, the previous administration had failed to provide accurate financial information, and several loans that had actually defaulted were reported as regular. Consequently, the earlier report presented a misleading picture of the bank’s financial position.

An investigation by the Bangladesh Bank found that by 2024, Union Bank’s non-performing loans (NPLs) had risen sharply to around 87%. A significant portion of the bank’s total loans was linked to a few large business groups, whose failure to repay their debts led the bank into a liquidity crisis. At present, Union Bank is under the supervision of the central bank and is participating in a merger process with other Islamic banks.
