= Bangladesh Financial Intelligence Unit =

Government agency of Bangladesh

- বাংলাদেশ ফাইন্যান্সিয়াল ইন্টেলিজেন্স ইউনিট
- Seal of Bangladesh Financial Intelligence Unit

Agency overview
- Formed: June 2002; 24 years ago
- Type: Financial intelligence
- Jurisdiction: Government of Bangladesh
- Headquarters: Bangladesh Bank Building, Motijheel, Dhaka
- Agency executive: Iqtiaruddin Md. Mamun, Head
- Parent agency: Bangladesh Bank
- Website: bfiu.org.bd

The Bangladesh Financial Intelligence Unit (BFIU) is a government agency involved in fighting money laundering, terrorist financing, and other financial crimes. It receives suspicious transaction/activity reports, cash transaction reports, and other reports of financial transactions related to illegal activities. It analyzes the reports and shares the resulting financial intelligence with relevant authorities.

== History ==
The unit was founded as the Anti-Money Laundering Department of Bangladesh Bank in June 2002. The name of the department was changed to Bangladesh Financial Intelligence Unit on 25 January 2012 through the Money Laundering Prevention Act, 2012. The Asia/Pacific Group on Money Laundering recommended that the government form the unit. In 2015, the government of Bangladesh announced plans to provide autonomy to the unit. In 2016, the Bangladesh Bank confirmed the unit has been made autonomous.

In September 2021, the BFIU sent letters to banks requesting the bank details of 11 elected journalist leaders from the Bangladesh Federal Union of Journalists, Dhaka Reporters Unity, Dhaka Union of Journalists, and the National Press Club. The move was condemned by the opposition Bangladesh Nationalist Party, which described it as a tactic to scare journalists.

On 24 January 2022, the BFIU sought account information of Nobel Peace Prize winner Muhammad Yunus, a political opponent of Prime Minister Sheikh Hasina.
