= Islami Bank Bangladesh =

Shariah-based bank in Bangladesh

Islami Bank Bangladesh PLC
- Type: Public Limited Company
- Traded as: DSE: ISLAMIBANK; CSE: ISLAMIBANK
- Industry: Banking; Financial services
- Founded: 30 March 1983; 43 years ago
- Headquarters: Islami Bank Tower 40, Dilkusha C/A, Motijheel, Dhaka - 1000, Bangladesh
- Area served: Bangladesh & overseas
- Key people: Mohammad Zahir Hussain (Sole Statutory Representative); Md. Altaf Hossain (Managing Director); Mohammad Abdur Rahim FCA (Chief Financial Officer); Md. Habibur Rahman (Company Secretary)
- Products: Banking services, ATM/CRM services, Internet Banking, Payment Gateway, Mobile Banking, Consumer Banking; Corporate Banking; Investment Banking; Foreign Exchange Banking
- Revenue: ▲ ৳64.99 billion (US$530 million) (2019)
- Operating income: ▲ ৳43.79.74 billion (US$360 million) (2019)
- Net income: ▼ ৳238.69 (US$1.90) (2024)
- Total assets: ▲ ৳400 billion (US$3.3 billion) (2025)
- Total equity: ▲ ৳4320.58 million (US$35 million) (2024)
- Number of employees: 17,730
- Website: www.islamibankbd.com

Islami Bank Bangladesh PLC. (Bengali: ইসলামী ব্যাংক পিএলসি.), abbreviated as IBBPLC, more commonly known as Islami Bank, is an Islamic banking company based in Bangladesh. It became incorporated on 13 March 1983 as a public limited company under the Companies Act 1913, and started operation on 30 March, the same year. IBBPLC maintains its own ATM Booths with a country-wide shared ATM network. IBBPLC has been the largest private banking network in Bangladesh. The bank has been listed with both Dhaka Stock Exchange Ltd. and Chittagong Stock Exchange Ltd.

== History ==
Bangladesh became a member of the Organisation of Islamic Cooperation in February 1974 and signed the charter for Islamic Development Bank in September that year. In April 1978, the 9th conference of foreign ministers of the Organisation of Islamic Cooperation recommended reorganizing the banking system of the member countries to Islamic operations systems gradually. In November 1980, A S M Fakhrul Ahsan, Director (Research) of Bangladesh Bank recommended for commencing Islamic banking operation in Bangladesh. In April 1981, the Ministry of Finance in a letter written to Bangladesh Bank recommended to start separate Islamic banking counters in all branches of the state-owned banks of Bangladesh on an experimental basis and keep separate ledgers for this purpose. In November 1982, a delegation of the Islamic Development Bank visited Dhaka to monitor and evaluate the possibility of a joint venture to establish an Islamic bank in the private sector in Bangladesh and recommended the Islamic Development Bank as an entrepreneur to invest capital in the proposed Islamic bank. As a consequence, Islami Bank Limited, the first shari'ah compliant bank in Bangladesh started operations on 30 March 1983. It was founded by Saudi and Kuwaiti investors who provided 70 per cent of the initial capital. It is a public limited company registered under the Indian Companies Act of 1913. IBBL is a joint venture of the government of Bangladesh, 22 businessmen of Bangladesh, Islamic Development Bank, and investment firms and banks from Muslim Middle Eastern countries.

According to The Economist, "Islami Bank was a pioneer in financing Bangladesh's rise as the apparel industry's main production base outside China."

In 2012, United States Senate Permanent Subcommittee on Investigations mentioned possible ties of Islami Bank Bangladesh Limited to terrorism financing through HSBC Bank which the bank denied. The report questioned the banks link to Al Rajhi Bank. Islami Bank hired Dana Contratto and Associates, a lobbying company, for 25 thousand USD per month to lobby for the bank in Washington DC.

In July 2013, Islami Bank had difficulties getting repayment from Ananda Shipyard & Slipways Limited after the company lost 89.4 million USD foreign orders.

Clients of JP Morgan purchased a three percent stake in the Islami Bank in November 2015.

Change of Ownership

In 2017, the bank had a sudden change in its ownership and management structure. The newly appointed Bank management claimed the bank was trying to stem out its "Jamat-e-Islami roots". This sudden change, however, has led the bank to a financial crisis. The change also saw foreign investors reduce their stake in the bank. As of 2017, Islami Bank Bangladesh commands 90% of Islamic-banking assets and deposits in Bangladesh, is the country's biggest private lender overall, has 12 million depositors and a balance-sheet of $10 billion. After the change, the bank changed their recruitment policy to recruit non-Muslims and more women under newly appointed chairman Arastoo Khan. Arastoo Khan replaced Mustafa Anwar.

From January 2019 to March 2019, the defaulted loans of Islami Bank doubled to 69.16 billion BDT. It also rescheduled 600 defaulted loans through securing special approvals of Bangladesh Bank.

In 2022, many media outlets reported that the bank was giving out loans to suspicious businesses without proper verification. A 24 year old received a 9 billion BDT loan from Islami Bank Bangladesh Limited a month after he established the company, MediGreen. MediGreen had applied for the loan 14 days after registering. Another company, S.S Straight Line, received 9 billion BDT loans within three weeks of being founded. Marts Business, received a 9 billion BDT loan within one month of registration.

S. Alam Group which has the controlling stake of the bank took 300 billion BDT loans from Islami Bank Bangladesh Limited. The group had taken the loans violating banking rules of Bangladesh. Around same time large amount of deposits were withdrawn from the bank feeding into a liquidity shortage. Bangladesh Bank appointed an observer to the bank and began an investigation into irregular loans worth 72.46 billion BDT. In December, Justices Md Nazrul Islam Talukder and Khizir Hayat Lizu of the High Court Division ordered an investigation into the irregular loans at Islami Bank and sought an explanation from S. Alam Group on the 300 billion BDT loan. On 29 December 2022, Islami Bank Bangladesh Limited took 80 billion BDT in emergency loans from Bangladesh Bank. Ahsan H. Mansur, Director of Policy Research Institute of Bangladesh, alleged the government officials were aware of the loans scams at the bank involving S. Alam Group.

In January 2023, Bangladesh Securities and Exchange Commission approved Islami Bank Bangladesh Limited to raise 8 billion BDT through issuing bonds. Bangladesh Bank purchased land from Islami Bank near its headquarters for 1.1 billion BDT. In February 2023, Md Shahabuddin, resigned from the board of directors of Islami Bank Bangladesh Limited after being elected President of Bangladesh, a position he held since 2017. An additional managing director and deputy managing director of the bank resigned within a week of each other in April. The bank announced plans to increase confidence of its depositors. Bangladesh Bank report published in its website shows that IBBPLC has spent by far the highest amount on corporate social responsibility in Bangladesh for the year 2022.

Islami Bank in the Wake of the July Revolution

As of December 2024, Islami Bank Bangladesh PLC stands as one of the most influential financial institutions in Bangladesh, with a client base of approximately 235 million. The bank operates an extensive network of over 4,000 branches, 263 sub-branches, and 2,800 agent banking outlets, alongside more than 3,000 ATM and CRM locations across the country. With total deposits amounting to BDT 1,50,000 crore, the bank plays a central role in the nation’s economy. Islami Bank is the primary channel for handling foreign remittance inflows into Bangladesh and has financed over 2 million entrepreneurs. It has invested in more than 6,000 industrial projects and is recognized as the country’s leading financier in the SME sector. Through its microcredit initiatives, the bank has supported 1.7 million marginal families, contributing significantly to rural economic development. Its efforts in job creation have led to approximately 10 million employment opportunities nationwide. Additionally, its mobile financial service platform, CellFin, has reached 4.5 million account holders.

Islami Bank Bangladesh PLC is also acknowledged as the highest corporate taxpayer within the Bangladeshi banking industry.

== Key Shareholders of Islami Bank Bangladesh PLC ==
The Islamic Development Bank, previously the largest institutional investor in Islami Bank Bangladesh, significantly reduced its stake in the bank from 7.5% to 2.1% following the controversial government-backed restructuring in 2017. Other key foreign stakeholders in Islami Bank have included Dubai Islamic Bank, Kuwait Finance House, Luxembourg Islami Bank, Al Rajhi Bank, as well as three ministers from Kuwait, reflecting the institution's strong historical ties to major Islamic financial entities in the Middle East.

63% shared owned by the above shareholders and 60,000 people of Bangladesh are owners of the rest 37 percent shares.

== Awards of Islami Bank Bangladesh PLC ==
Global Finance, a reputed US-based quarterly magazine, awarded IBBPLC as the best bank of Bangladesh for the Year 1999, 2000, 2004 and 2005, and the best Islamic financial institution of Bangladesh every year from 2008 to 2013.

Islami Bank PLC has been honored with the Remittance Award 2024 by the Ministry of Expatriates' Welfare and Overseas Employment for collecting the highest remittance during the fiscal year 2023-2024. The award was presented to Mohammed Monirul Moula, managing director of the bank, by Dr. Asif Nazrul, Advisor to the Ministry of Expatriates' Welfare and Overseas Employment, and Asif Mahmud Shojib Bhuyain, Advisor to the Ministry of Youth and Sports. The ceremony took place at the Osmani Memorial Auditorium on Wednesday, December 18, 2024, in celebration of National Migrants Day and National Expatriates Day 2024.

Md. Rafiqul Islam, Deputy Managing Director, along with Mohammad Masud and Mohammed Eyahya, Executive Vice Presidents, and Mohammad Shahadat Ullah, Senior Vice President, attended the event along with other executives and officials of the bank.

== See also about Banks ==
- Banking in Bangladesh
- Bangladesh Bank
- List of banks in Bangladesh
