= Global Islami Bank =

Bangladeshi private bank

Global Islami Bank PLC
- Formerly: NRB Global Bank
- Type: Commercial bank
- Traded as: DSE: GLOBALISLAMIBANK
- Industry: Banking
- Founded: July 25, 2013
- Headquarters: Dhaka, Bangladesh
- Key people: Mr. Syed Habib Hasnat (Managing Director)
- Products: Banking services ATM services Consumer Banking; Corporate Banking; Investment Banking
- Website: Official Website

Global Islami Bank PLC, formerly known as NRB Global Bank, is a fourth generation Bangladeshi sharia compliant private bank. Nizam Chowdhury is the chairperson of the Bank. Syed Habib Hasnat is the managing director of Global Islami Bank.

== History ==
The Bank was founded as NRB Global Bank on 25 July 2013 targeting not resident Bangladeshis. Bangladesh Bank provided licenses to nine banks including NRB Global Bank in 2013 on the condition that the bank will eventually list on the stock market. On 14 August 2013, Md Abdul Quddus was appointed managing director of NRB Global Bank.

In 2015, Prashanta Kumar Halder became the managing director of the Bank.

Nizam Chowdhury, director of Diamond Life Insurance Company Limited and Kushira Power Limited, was appointed chairman of NRB Global Bank in August 2016.

In April 2019, the NRB Global Bank announced its intention to change its name to Global Bank of Bangladesh due to the existence of two banks, NRB Commercial Bank Limited and NRB Bank, which included NRB in their names.

In 2020, NRB Global Bank was providing both conventional and sharia compliant banking services. In August 2020, Bangladesh Financial Intelligence Unit ordered the freezing of banks accounts of the former managing director of NRB Global Bank Proshanta Kumar Halder and his family members. Halder was being investigated for embezzlement from multiple financial institutions. On 31 December 2020, the bank announced plans to change their name. Former managing director of the Bank, Proshanto Kumar Haldar, is suspected by the Anti-Corruption Commission of embezzling hundreds of millions taka from various financial institutions.

On 3 January 2021, NRB Global Bank rebranded itself as Global Islami Bank and became a sharia compliant bank. In June, the banks proposal to raise 42.5 billion taka from an IPO was approved by Bangladesh Bank. In September 2021, Bangladesh Bank fined the bank for going beyond the investment ceiling for banks in the stock market.
