= Md. Abdul Karim =

Bangladeshi civil servant

Md. Abdul Karim is a retired secretary and former principal secretary to Bangladeshi Prime Minister Sheikh Hasina. He is the chairman of IPDC Finance. He is the president of Bangladesh Scouts Foundation and Bangladesh Deaf Sports Federation. He is the executive director of Underprivileged Children's Educational Programme. He is a former chairman of the National Board of Revenue.

He is a former managing director of Palli Karma-Sahayak Foundation. He is a former chairman of Green Delta Insurance and advisor to BRAC. Karim is the secretary general of the South East Asian Cooperation Foundation. He is a member of the board of advisors of the Asian University for Women. He is a director of Eastland Insurance Company Limited. He is a former secretary of the Bridges Division. He is a former secretary of the Ministry of Home Affairs.

== Early life ==
Karim graduated from the University of Chittagong with a master's in Chemistry. He has another masters from University of Birmingham in Development Administration. He completed his PhD degree from Bangladesh University of Professionals.

== Career ==
Karim was the secretary to the Ministry of Commerce and Ministry of Fisheries and Livestock in 2005. He is a former chairman of the National Board of Revenue. He was the secretary to the Ministry of Home Affairs.

In 2009, Karim was appointed principal secretary to Prime Minister Sheikh Hasina on a two-year contract. He was the previous secretary of the Bridges Division. In 2012, he was the president of Bangladesh Scouts. He is a member of the Chattagram Samity.

from 2016 to 2017, Karim was the president of Rotary Club of Dhaka Buriganga. In July 2017, he was elected chairperson of the Green Delta Insurance Company Limited. He was re-elected chairperson of the Green Delta Insurance Company Limited in 2018. He is the managing director of Bangabandhu Film City.

Karim was elected chairman of IPDC Finance in January 2020. His name was proposed for the Bangladesh Election Commission in February 2022 by Bangladesh Tariqat Federation. In July 2021, he was appointed executive director of Underprivileged Children's Educational Programme. He is a director of Eastland Insurance Company since 2023. He is the president of the management committee of the UCEP Institute of Science and Technology.
