= M. Mokammel Haq =

Bangladeshi civil servant

- Education: University of Dhaka
- Occupations: Ex-chairperson, Underprivileged Children's Educational Programme, Retired Director General of Export Promotion Bureau and independent director of Mutual Trust Bank Limited
- Parent: Mohammad Mozammel Haq

Mohammad Mokammel Haq is a retired secretary and former chairperson of the Underprivileged Children's Educational Programme. He is the former chairman of the Board of Investment with the rank and status of a government minister. He is the chairperson of Kabi Mozammel Haque Foundation. He is an independent director of Mutual Trust Bank Limited.

Haq is a former director general of the Export Promotion Bureau.

== Early life ==
Haq's father was Mohammad Mozammel Haq, a poet. He did his bachelors and masters at the University of Dhaka in 1956 and 1957 respectively. He was a classmate of Abul Maal Abdul Muhith.

== Career ==
As Deputy Commissioner of Sylhet District, Haq provided funding to Ushashi journal of Murari Chand College, founded by Abu Hena Mustafa Kamal, in 1968. He worked on relief operations during the 1970 Bhola cyclone.

From 1970 to 1974, Haq was the Director General of the Integrated Rural Development Programme. From 1974 to 1975, he was the secretary of the Ministry of Education. From 1975 to 1980, Haq was the Vice-Chairman of the Export Promotion Bureau. From 1977 to 1980, he was a director of Rupali Bank Limited. In 1985, he was a director of food production and rural development at the Commonwealth Secretariat.

From 1986 to 1990, Haq was the secretary of the Ministry of Commerce and Ministry of Land. Following the 1991 Bangladesh cyclone, he was appointed Zonal coordinator and co-chairman of the Chittagong Coordination Cell. He coordinated relief operations with the United States military detachment sent to Bangladesh.

Haq established Halima Khatun Girl's High School in 1993. From 1994 to 1995, he was the chairman of the Board of Investment. He was a member of the Bangladesh Planning Commission. From 1997 to 1998, he was the Chairman of Janata Insurance Company Limited.

From 1999 to 2001, Haq was the chairman of the Board of Investment.

Haq became the President of the Commonwealth Society of Bangladesh in 2015.

In 2018, several intelligence agencies identified Haq as being involved with the narcotics trade. He was appointed an independent director of Mutual Trust Bank Limited. He is a former director of Pioneer Insurance Company Limited.

Haq is a member of the Bangladesh Economic Association, Diabetic Association of Bangladesh, Bangla Academy, and Underprivileged Childrens Educational Program. He is an advisor of Sydney International School.
