= MIDAS Financing Limited =

Financial institution in Bangladesh

- Formation: 1995
- Headquarters: Dhaka, Bangladesh
- Region served: Bangladesh
- Official language: Bengali
- Website: www.mfl.com.bd

MIDAS Financing Limited is a major non-bank financial institution in Bangladesh.

== History ==
MIDAS (Micro Industries Development Assistance and Services) Financing Limited was established on 16 May 1995. It provided financial support to small women entrepreneurs to establish minimart.

On 11 October 1999, Midas secured permission from Bangladesh Bank.

MIDAS Financing Limited listed on Dhaka Stock Exchange and Chittagong Stock Exchange on 26 October 2002 and 27 July 2004 respectively. From 23 March 2005, it shares used the Central Depository Bangladesh Limited.

Small and Medium Enterprise Foundation gave a loan of 50 million taka to MIDAS Financing Limited on 18 May 2012 to provide loans to small and medium enterprises.

MIDAS board member Mirza Ali Behrouze Ispahani died in 2017. MIDAS Financing Limited launched MIDAS Investment Limited in January 2017 as a merchant bank.

Parveen Mahmud, chairperson of MIDAS Financing Limited and Underprivileged Children's Educational Programme, was made a trustee of Transparency International Bangladesh in 2018.

On 3 April 2019, Mohammed Nasir Uddin Chowdhury was elected chairman of the board of directors of MIDAS Financing Limited. Mustafizur Rahman was appointed Managing Director. ERA InfoTech signed an agreement with MIDAS to provide IT services to the company. It provided 2.5 percent dividend in 2019. It held a fair for products of small and medium enterprises at the MIDAS Convention Centre in Dhanmondi.

In 2020, MIDAS Financing Limited sponsored campus club summit in partnership with The Daily Star. It declared a 2.5 percent cash and stock dividend.

Midas Financing Limited repointed Mustafizur Rahman Managing Director in 2022. The Business Standard wrote how none bank financials institutions, such as MIDAS, were charging high interest rates on their loans as they were offering high interest rate to depositors.

== Board of directors ==
- Rokia Afzal Rahman
- Abdul Karim
- Ali Imam Majumder
- M. Hafizuddin Khan
- Mohammed Nasir Uddin Chowdhury
- Md. Shamsul Alam
- Md. Shahedul Alam
- Gulam Rahman
- Nazneen Sultana
- Mustafizur Rahman

== Subsidiaries ==
- MIDAS Investment Limited
