= St. Joseph Higher Secondary School =

Catholic school and college in Bangladesh

- সেন্ট যোসেফ উচ্চ মাধ্যমিক স্কুল

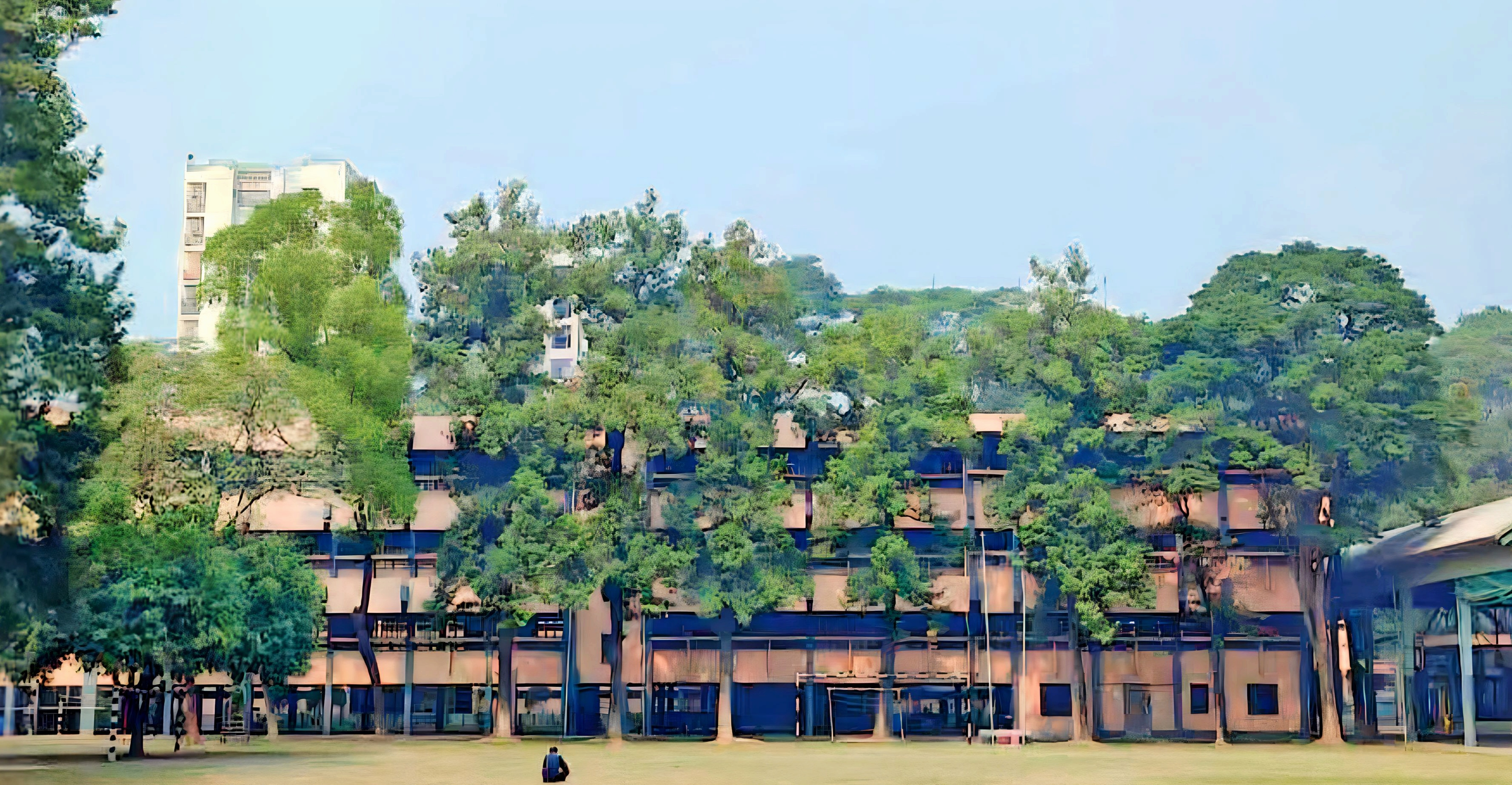
- Front view of St. Joseph

Location
- 97 Asad Avenue, Mohammadpur, Dhaka; 1207; Bangladesh; 23.7598°N 90.3701°E

Information
- Type: Higher Secondary Catholic missionary school
- Motto: Latin : Progressus In Sapientia et Virtus; Advancing In Wisdom And Virtue; Bengali: প্রজ্ঞা ও পুণ্যের সাথে হও আগুয়ান
- Religious affiliations: Roman Catholic Archdiocese of Dhaka (Congregation of Holy Cross)
- Established: 19 March 1954; 72 years ago
- Founder: Br. Jude Costello C.S.C
- School board: Dhaka Education Board
- School district: Dhaka
- Session: 2025-26
- School code: 1204
- Principal: Br. Leo J. Pereira C.S.C
- Faculty: 89
- Grades: 3-12
- Gender: Male
- Enrollment: 2600 (As of 2023) Male
- Language: Bangla and English
- Campus size: 3.57 acres (1.44 ha)
- Campus type: Urban
- Color: White Gray
- Slogan: Once a Josephite, always Josephite
- Sports: Football, basketball, cricket, chess, volleyball, athletics, table tennis, badminton
- Nickname: St. Joseph College
- Publication: The Josephite
- Alumni: Full list
- Alumni name: Saint Joseph Old Boys Foundation
- Demonym: Josephite
- Named after: Saint Joseph
- EIIN: 108259
- Website: www.sjs.edu.bd

St. Joseph Higher Secondary School (Bengali: সেন্ট যোসেফ উচ্চ মাধ্যমিক স্কুল) is a Catholic higher secondary school in Asad Avenue, Mohammadpur, Dhaka, Bangladesh, regarded as one of the best schools in Bangladesh. In 2023, St. Joseph was awarded the 'A+' grade. It is a school offering education from third to twelfth grade, with pupils averaging 8 to 18 years of age. The school is a single-shift (morning) school with over 2,500 students. In 1965, the college relocated to historical Asad Gate near Jatiya Sangsad Bhaban under the jurisdiction of the Mohammadpur Thana, and being named St. Joseph Higher Secondary School.

After the independence of Bangladesh, it was changed from English medium curriculum to National Curriculum-based Bengali medium. At present, English and Bengali are used for teaching up to the higher secondary level. As the name St. Joseph Higher Secondary School suggests, education provided by the school is up to the higher secondary level. Every year, about 500-600 students graduate from its Higher Secondary section and 170-180 students from the secondary school section. The students of this institution are known as "Josephites".

The school has its own playground, basketball court, cricket pitch, badminton court (also used as a volleyball court) and table tennis court area.

== History ==
=== Early history ===
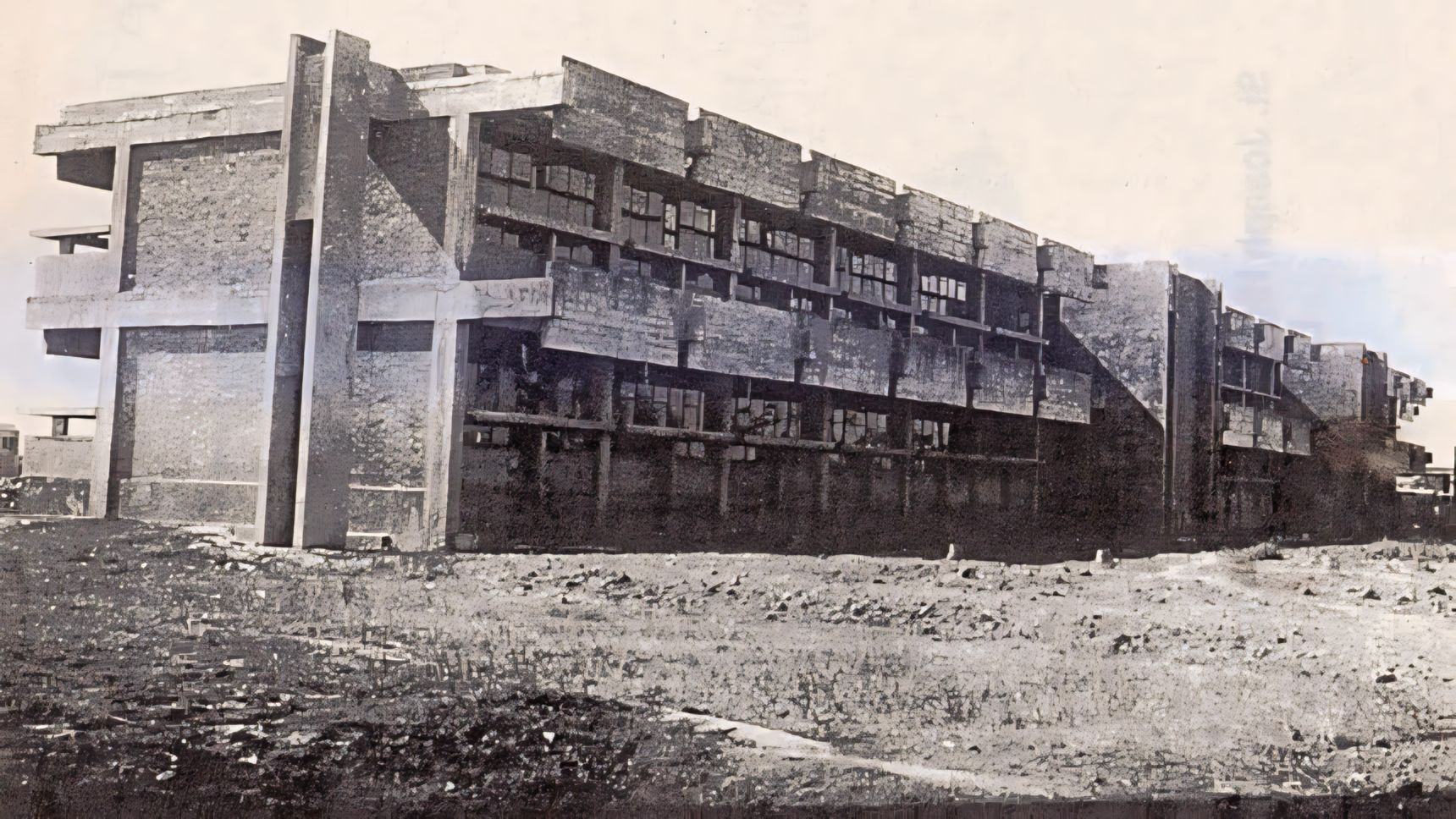
North building of St. Joseph College in 1964

On 19 March 1954, Brother Jude Costello, an American missionary member of Congregation of Holy Cross working under the Catholic Archdiocese of Dhaka, who was also headmaster of St. Gregory's High School then, founded the school as the "St. Joseph English Medium School" at Monir Hossain Lane, Narinda, in the current old part of Dhaka. The institution had a General Certificate of Education (GCE) based education structure.

In July 1965, all the classes shifted from Narinda to the Mohammadpur compoyears. The new school was very modern and unfinished, leaving students in early years to deal with active construction in their environment.

=== Liberation War and ensuing history ===
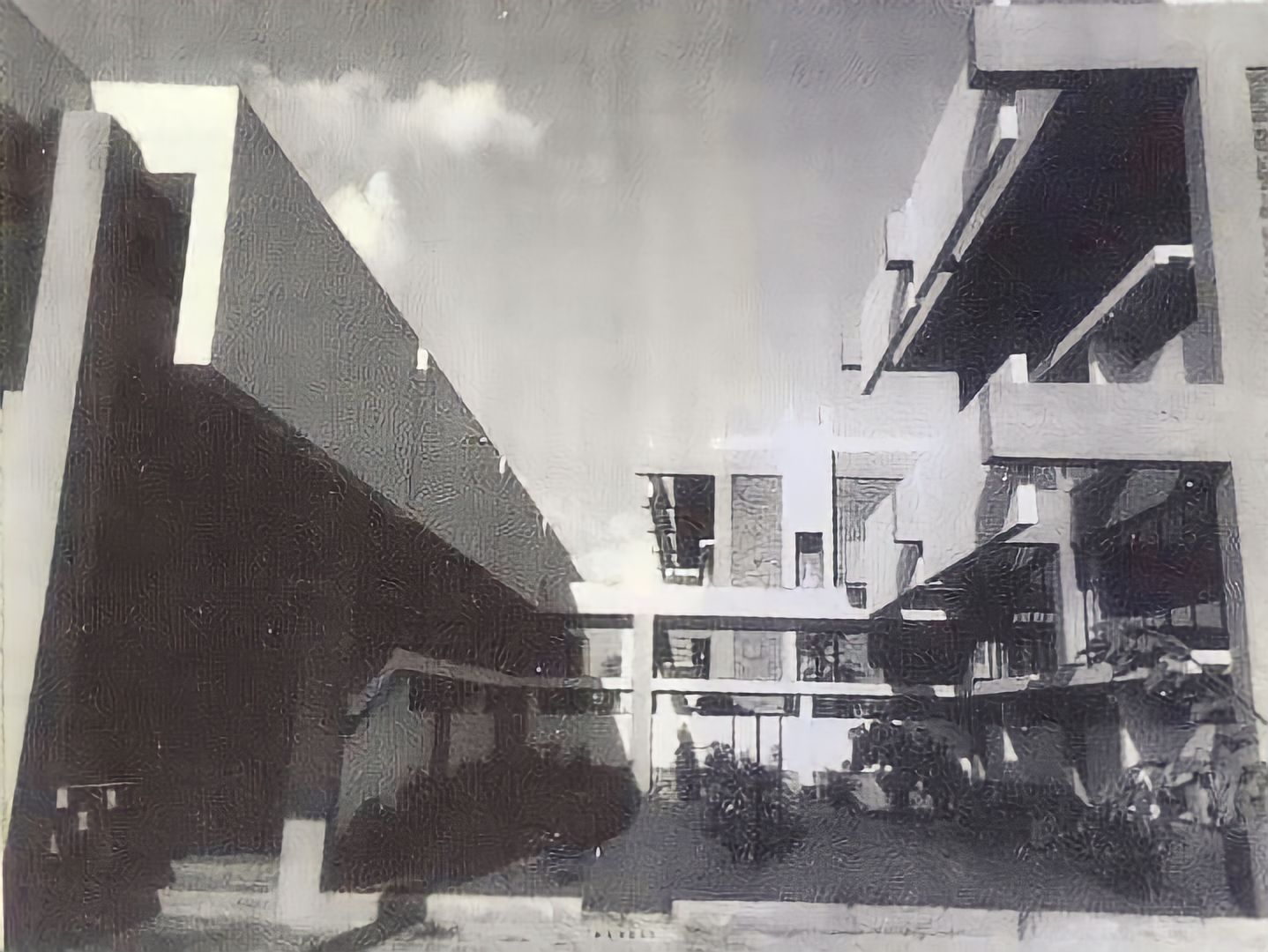
St. Joseph during the Liberation War of Bangladesh in 1971

Following the War of Independence, Principal Br. Ralph Baird departed from his teaching role, engaging actively in the nation's reconstruction efforts. He contributed significantly to the country's relief, and rehabilitation, and championed human rights initiatives through non-governmental development organizations. Concurrently, students from St. Joseph College, accompanied by teachers, ventured to remote regions in support of relief and rehabilitation endeavours on behalf of the institution.

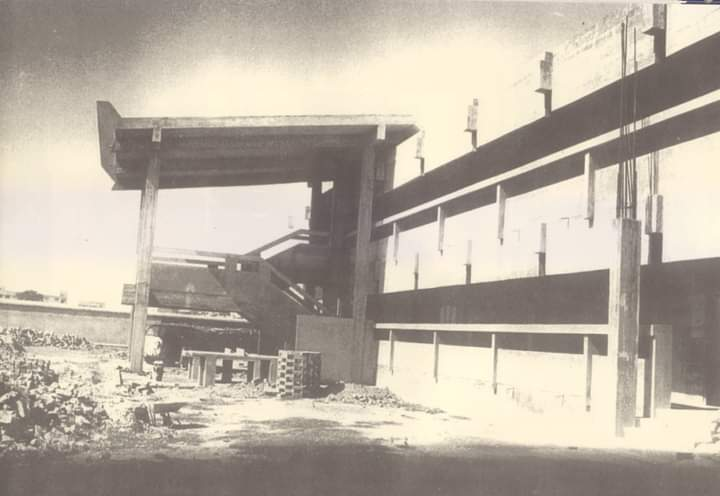
Construction of St Joseph Higher Secondary School in 1974

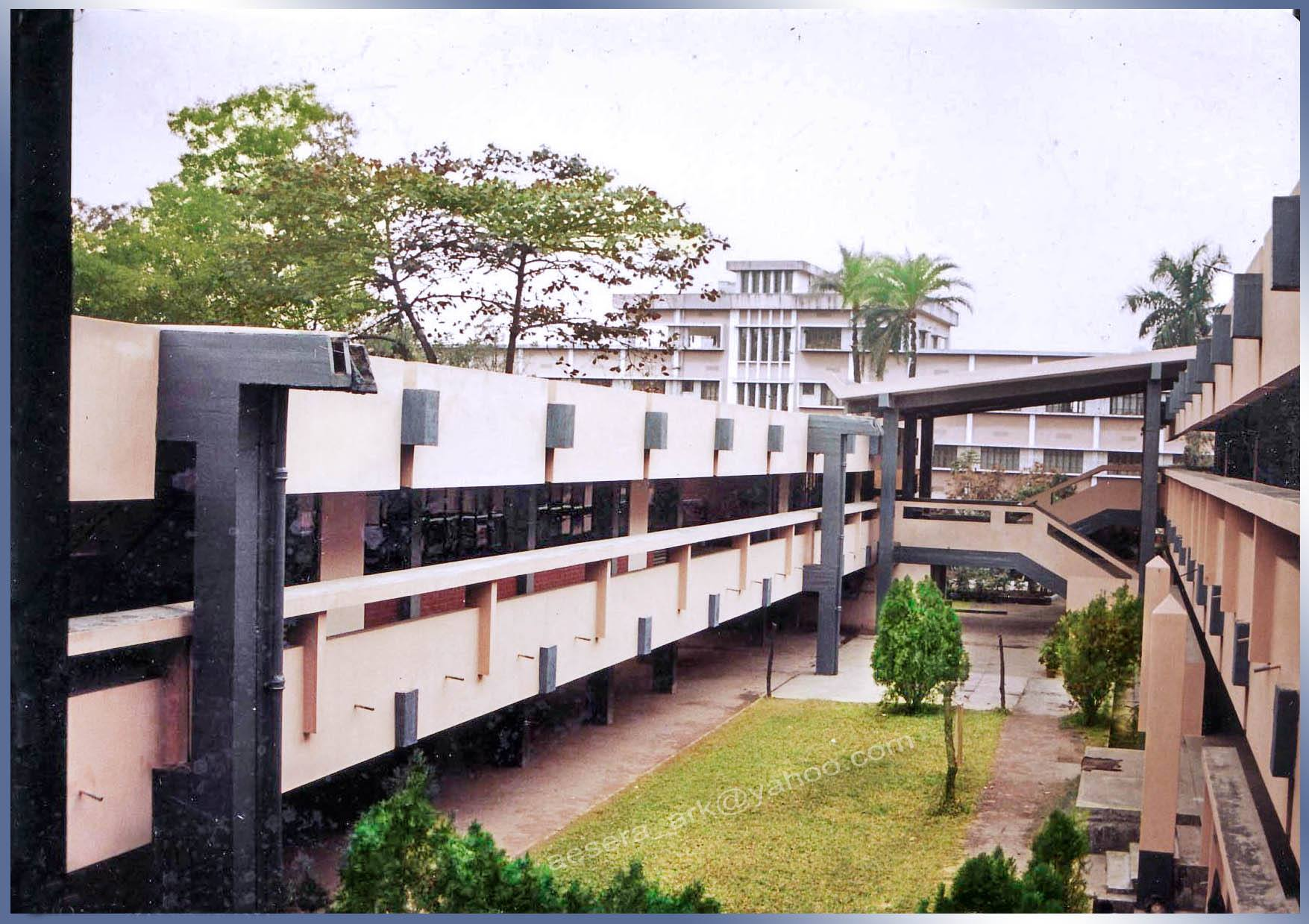
In 1998, when the school was two and three storied building combined.

After the liberation and independence of Bangladesh, the school grew and developed with the new country. The medium of instruction changed to Bangla, and the school registered with the Dhaka education board. In 1973, the last of the Cambridge groups took their examinations. During the ten years of Cambridge, 233 boys took the overseas examination and 98% passed with over 60% in the first division. In 1974, the first batch of boys took the SSC Examination; 32 of the 33 boys passed and one of them placed first in the combined merit list.

=== Current status ===
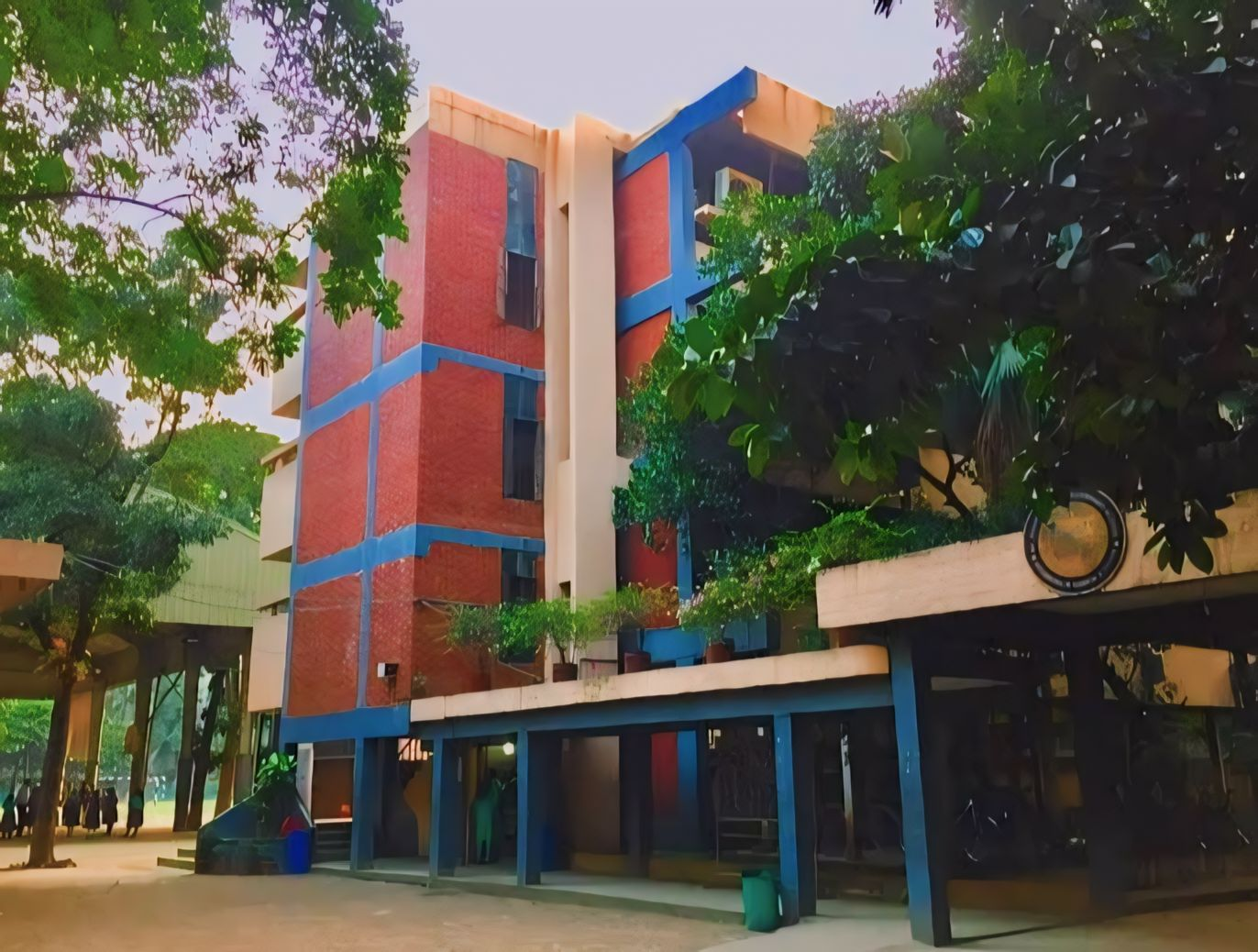
North building of St. Joseph

The school was initially named "St. Joseph High School". In 2001, Higher Secondary Education (equivalent to college) was introduced in Saint Joseph, and the name of the institution was changed to "Saint Joseph Higher Secondary School".

The institution celebrated its Golden Jubilee at the campus in 2004, and on 19 March 2024, it celebrated its 70th anniversary of establishment. In the later 21st century, St. Joseph has continued to expand in student body and faculty size, and has seen the establishment of several research centers and programs.

== Religious affiliation and ethos ==
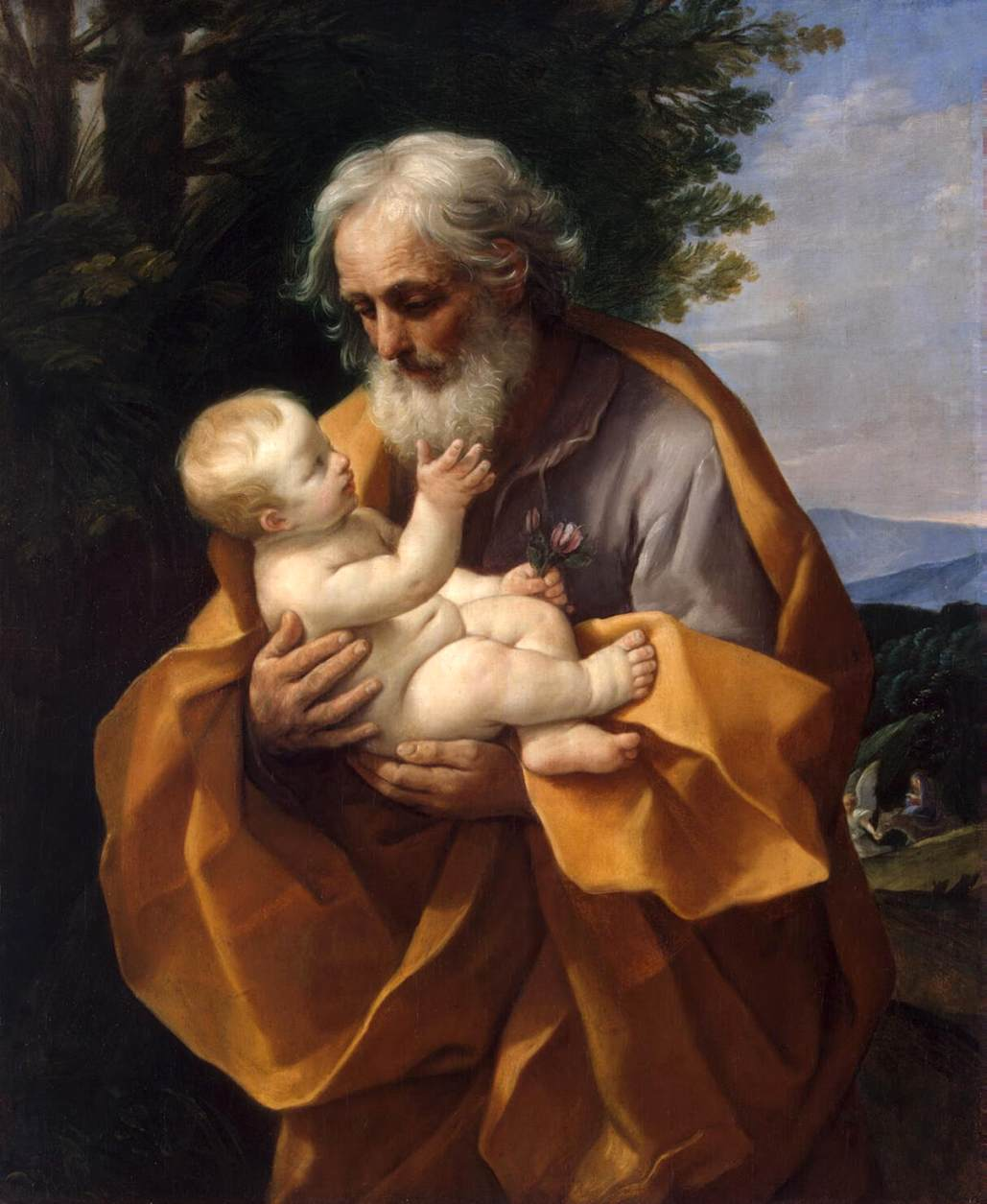
Saint Joseph, after whom the college is named

The college is Roman Catholic and the Congregation of Holy Cross exercises responsibility over it through a Governing Body whose chairman is the Archbishop of the Archdiocese of Dhaka, His Grace Most Rev. Msgr Bejoy N. D. Cruze, OMI. The institution is named after Saint Joseph, a Christian saint and the legal father of Jesus. The college seeks to give an all-round formation, inculcating both human and spiritual values. It gives special consideration to Roman Catholics and also Buddhists and Ethnic minority (under the minority rights enshrined in the Constitution of Bangladesh) for whose education the college was founded.

== Academic identification ==
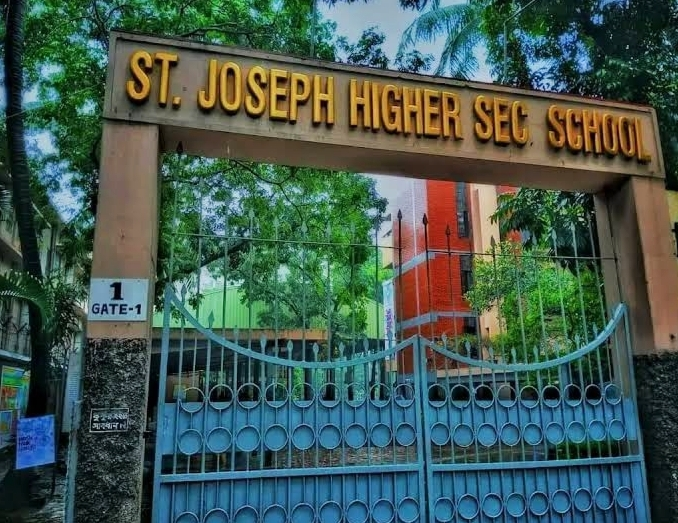
St. Joseph's first gate

Providing both primary and secondary education levels, since 2001 this institution has also offered higher secondary education. The secondary level has both science and commerce curriculum. The higher secondary level includes humanities too. All levels have both Bengali and English language versions, with each class having two Bengali and one English version sections. Since 2017, it has rebooted the English medium section of the school named St. Joseph International School following the Cambridge Curriculum.

=== Admission ===
The school section admission goes through three levels: an interview, a written test and a final selection. Admission into class 3 is held officially, with around 2500-6000 students competing for only 180 seats. Other classes (4–9) may offer admissions if vacant seats are available.

The college section usually selects only 600-700 students out of approximately 12000 applicants.

=== Curriculum ===
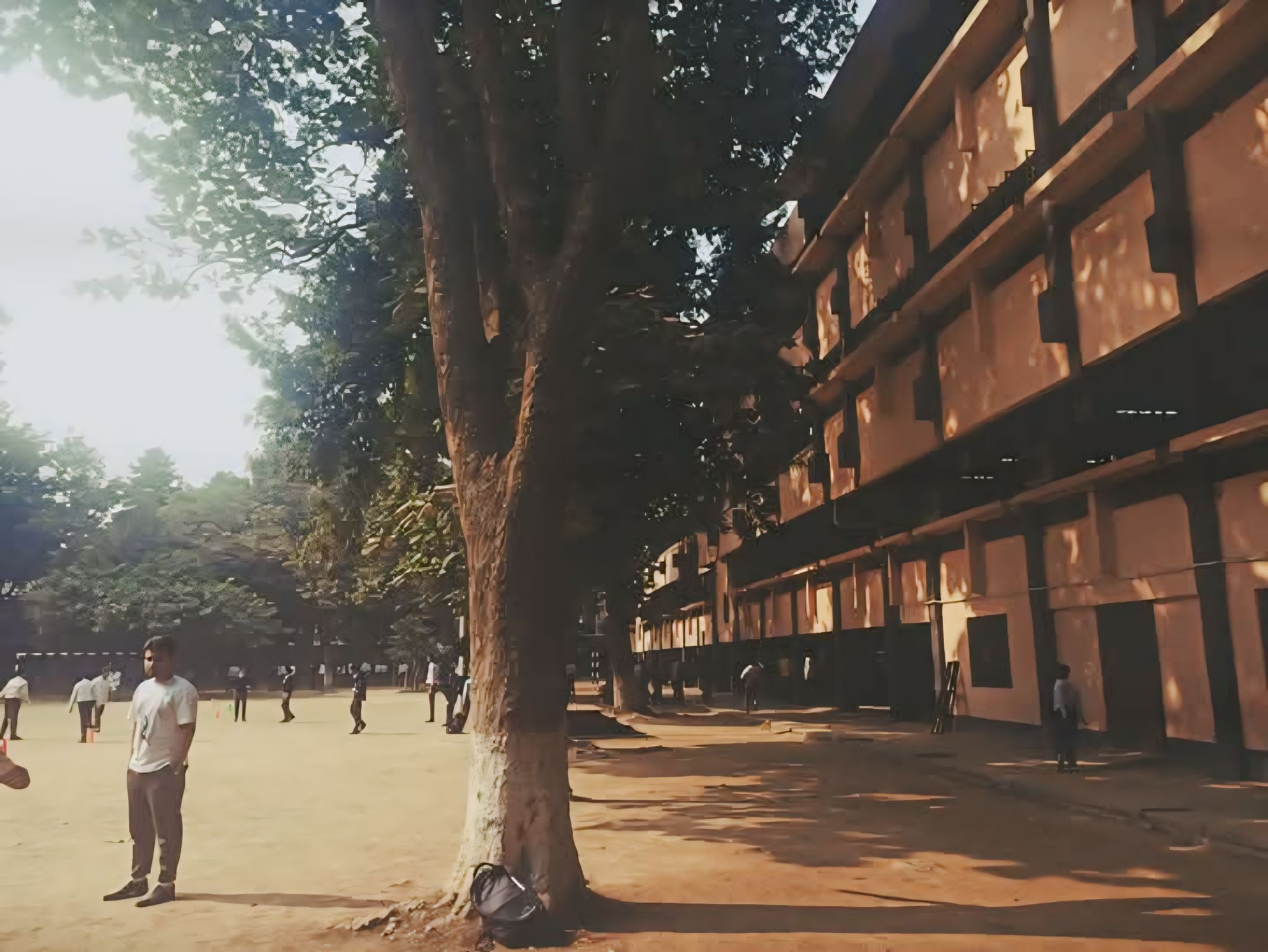
Rag Day celebration in St. Joseph

The school follows the National Curriculum of studies. Upon establishment, it was an English Medium Cambridge school. Following the independence of Bangladesh in 1971, the school adapted alongside the national curriculum. In 2004, it introduced the English version first in grade 6, gradually adding one English version section to each grade.

The average graduating class from Saint Joseph each year has 160 to 180 students. The secondary level offers S.S.C (equivalent to O level) examinations and the higher secondary level offers H.S.C (equivalent to A level) examinations. The institution is recognized by the Board of Intermediate and Higher Secondary Educations.

=== Grades and classes ===
St. Joseph uses names for its sections of grades, rather than numbers or letters. There are three sections for grades 3–10, and there are six sections for grades 11–12. In the school section, each class contains 50-60 students.

=== Uniform ===
The school uniform consists of a white shirt (school logo on the left side for school students and right side for the college students), dark grey pants, and black shoes. The school also encourages proper hair cut.

== Campus ==
=== Outdoors ===
The school has a 3.5-acre campus. It has grounds for association football, basketball, cricket, and volleyball, amidst other sports. The school basketball court, built in the 1960s and updated in 2008, also serves as a multipurpose auditorium. The main field is used as the football pitch and beside the main ground, the mini field is used as a volleyball court, with badminton courts to the side.

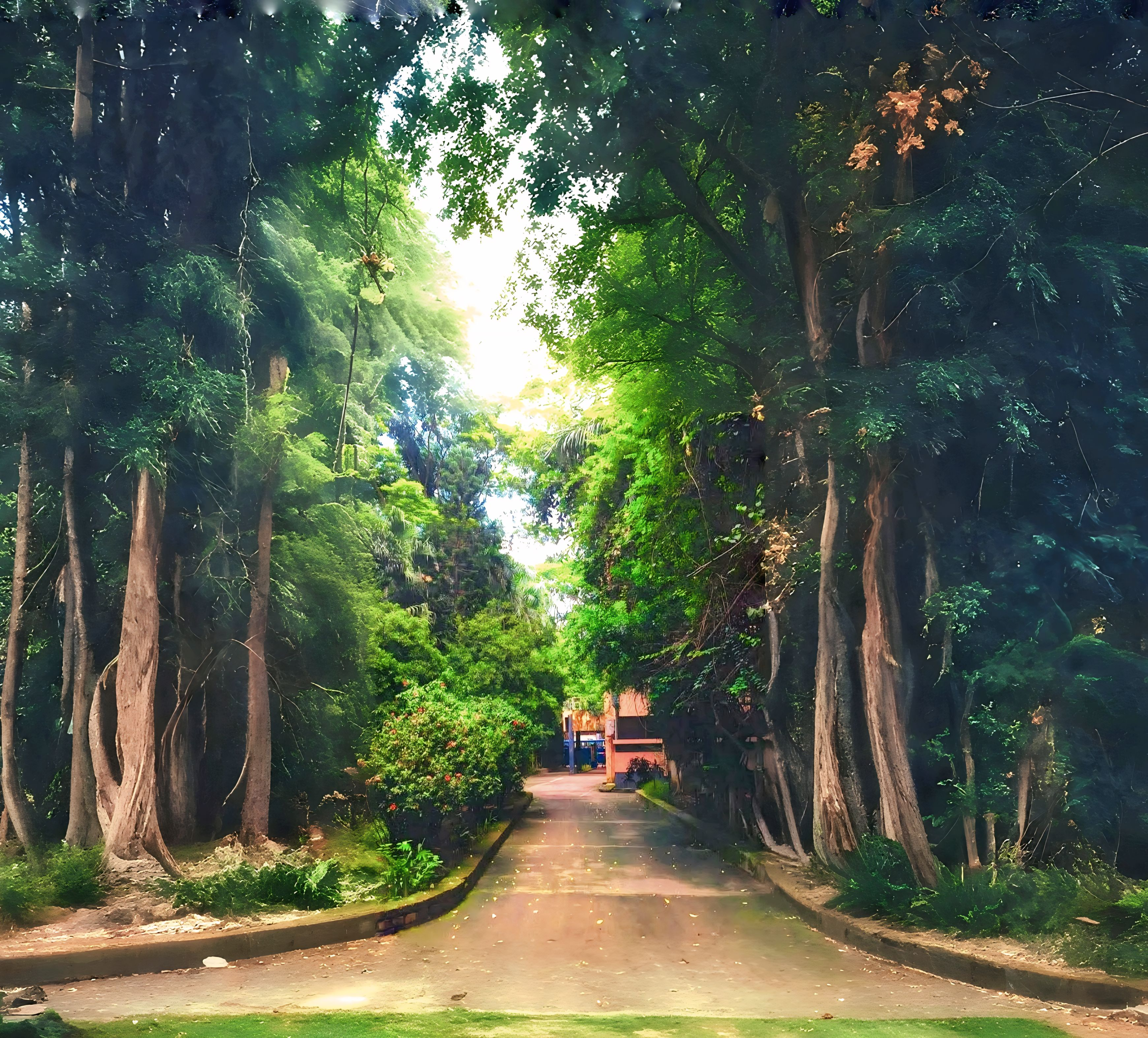
Pathway around the campus

=== Infrastructure and buildings ===
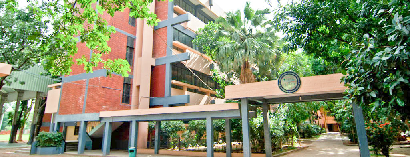
The School Campus viewed from the first gate

A composite of two four-story buildings with a two-story building in the annex for teachers and office is located in Dhaka City. The campus is designed by renowned architect Robert G. Boughey. The four-story buildings are known as the north and south building. The ground floor of the south building serves as a table tennis court. The school has three main entrances. The first and the second serve as the entry for students and teachers, the third one is for official purposes. The 3rd canteen is located there. Furthermore, a water bottle refilling station has been added for students, which is really beneficial especially in this hot summer.

=== Laboratories ===
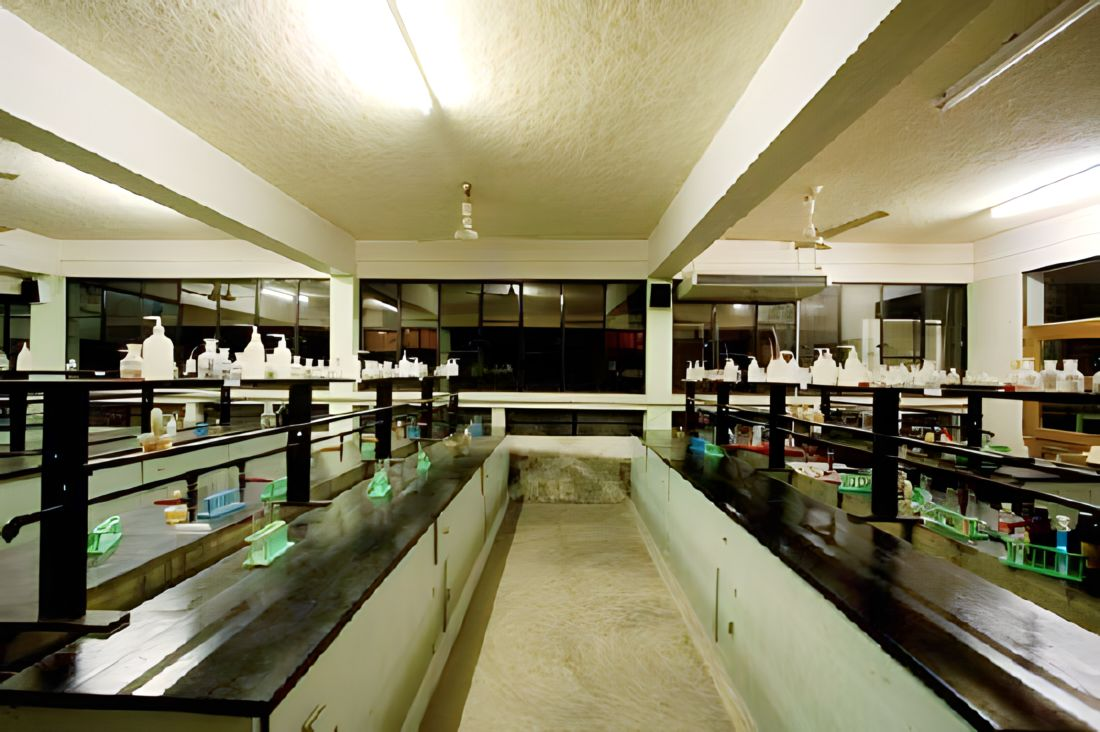
The chemistry lab

Facilities include one computer labs equipped with multimedia projectors, one chemistry lab, one physics lab and one biology lab.

=== Canteens ===
There are a total of three cafeterias on campus. The North Building has a modern food court for its students. While the main canteen offers various nutritious foods for the students.

=== Library ===
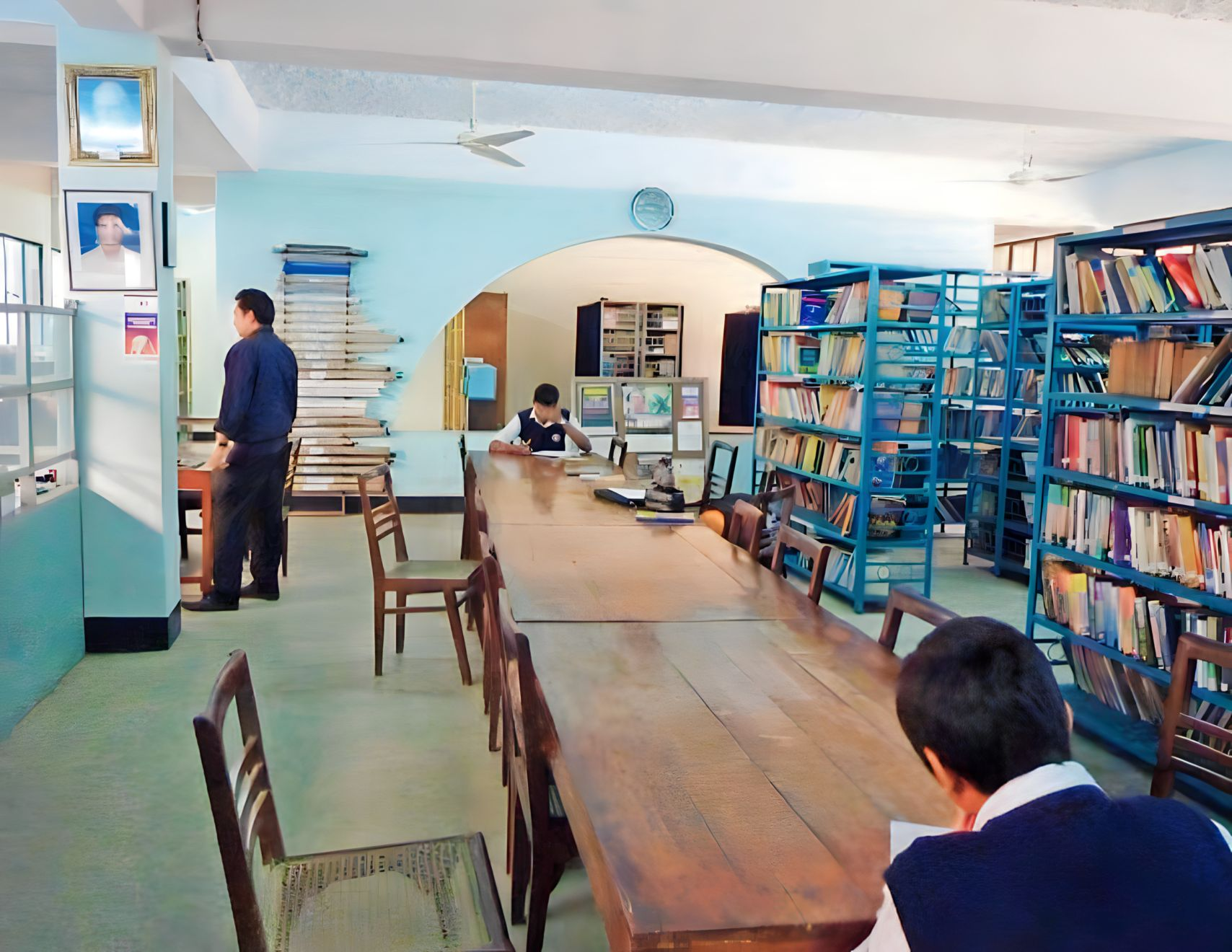
Library of Saint Joseph Higher Secondary School

The library was founded in 1954. It has approximately 10,000 books and magazines. The library works with the Bishwa Sahitya Kendra and British Council to arrange book reading programs. There are 2 library teachers assigned to comply the necessary tasks inside the library. Furthermore, librarians are selected from different classes, which boosts the inspiration to perform the duty inside the library. Recently, BKash and Bishwa Sahitya Kendra jointly donated more than 2000 books to the library.

=== Purposes of the campus ===
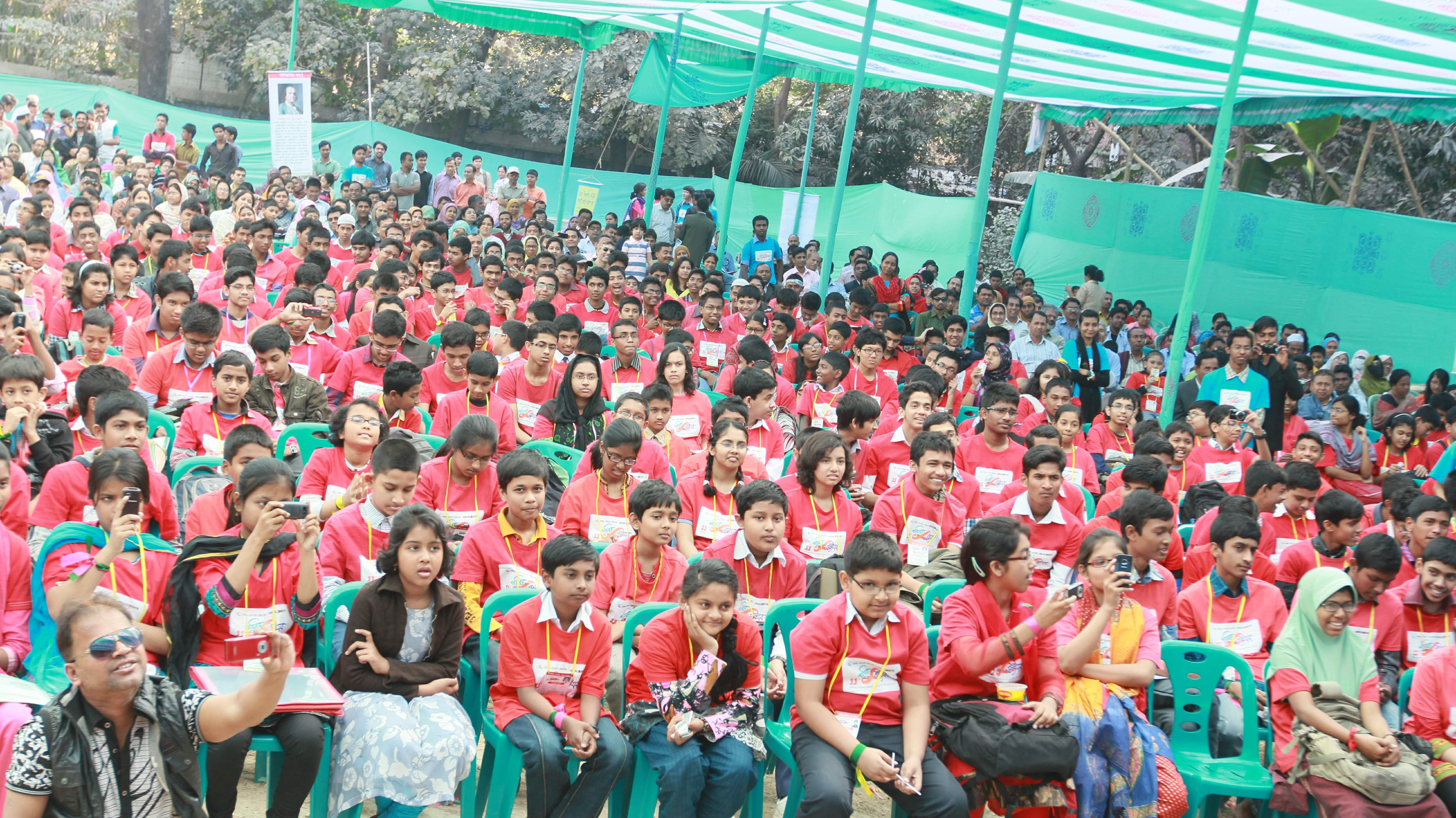
National Math Olympiad 2013 at St. Joseph Higher Secondary School

The southwest corner of the school holds a small hostel for the Brothers of Holy Cross. Since 2004, the school has hosted the national occurrence of the Bangladesh Mathematical Olympiad.

== Academic results and records ==
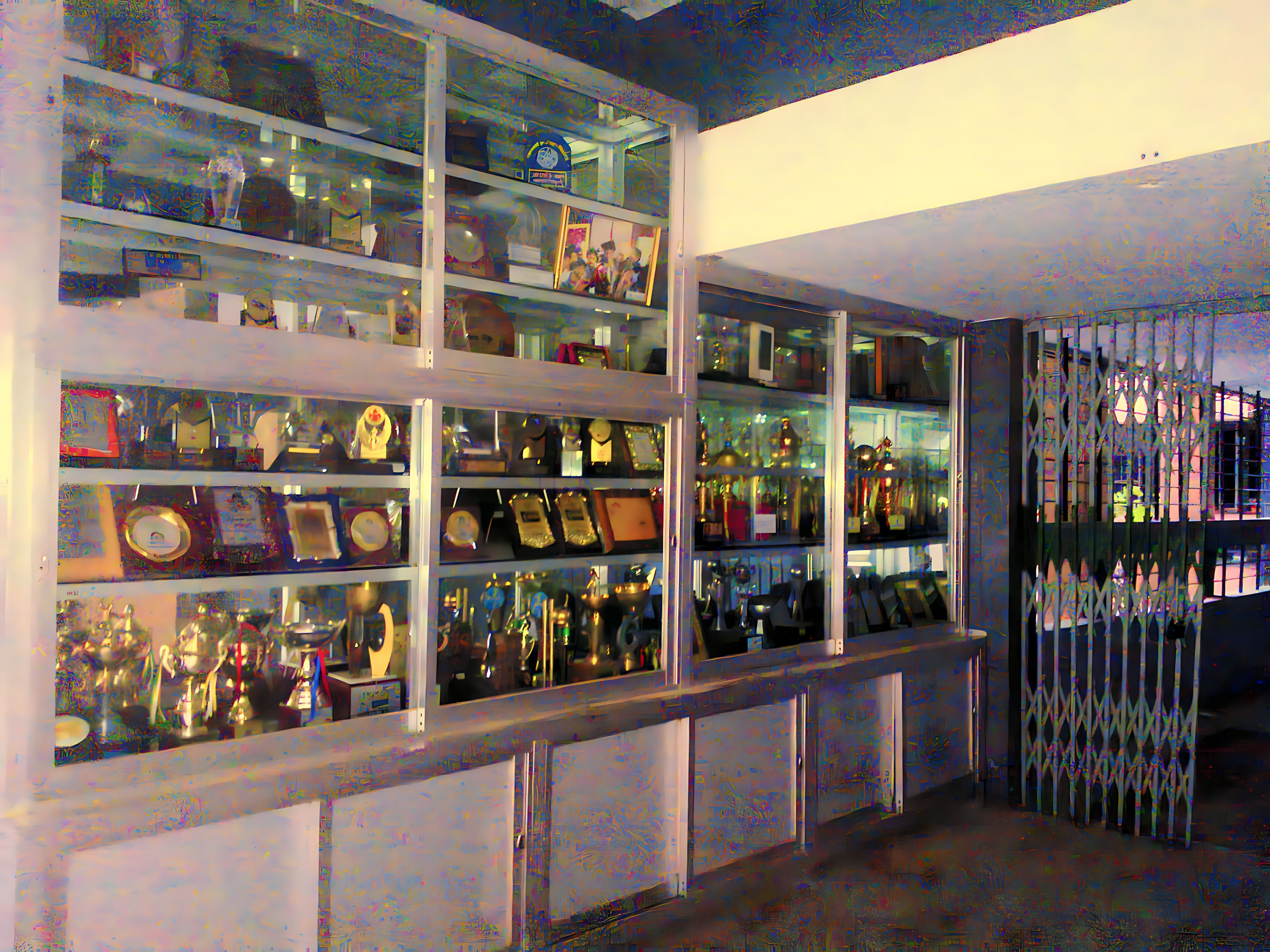
Award room of St. Joseph

- Ranked as A+ category college in the country.
- Introduction of Basketball in Bangladesh.
- Introduction of Parliamentary Format Debate in Bangladesh.
- In 2023, Dhaka Education Board ranked the institution in A+ category.
- Established the first High School Level Science Club of Bangladesh in 1957.
- Formed the first High School Level Debating Club in Bangladesh in 1969.
- Venue partner of first ever All-Asians university debate competition held in Bangladesh in 2008.
- Pioneer school in the British Council's global schooling scheme partnered with the Park View Church Community School of the UK since 2006.
- 13 Gold medals won in the 2007 IAS exam held by University of New South Wales, highest in the country.
- In 2018, Josephite Math Club won the Best Math Club Award.

== Extracurricular activities ==
St. Joseph has numerous extracurricular programs. Joseph's students, "Josephites", maintain relationships with peers from other colleges by participating in inter-college competitions and college festivals.

=== Scintilla Science Club ===
The Scintilla Science Club was established in 1957 which is the Bangladesh's first High School Science Club. It organizes an annual science fair. In 2023, the event drew 700 participants from 60 institutions. In addition to science projects displays, it featured Olympiads, quizzes, and other contests.

=== Josephite Reading and Language Club ===
The Josephite Language and Reading Club (JLRC) was founded in 2004. It organises an annual inter-school literature festival that features such events as a story writing contest, spelling bee, English Olympiad, quizzes, and extempore speaking competition.

=== Josephite Math Club ===
Josephite Math Club was founded in 2015. In 2018,It was noted as the best math club. It organizes an annual math program where students can show their potential.

== Notable alumni ==
The school's alumni include sportspeople, business executives, musicians, academics, politicians, military officers, and entertainers. Warfaze, one of the first heavy metal bands in Bangladesh, was started in 1984 by Ibrahim Ahmed Kamal and other boys from St. Joseph. Three of the five (as of 2017) Bangladeshi chess grandmasters, including the first South Asian grandmaster, Niaz Murshed, attended St Joseph.

=== Academia ===
- Mushfiq Mobarak, professor of economics, Yale University
- Imran Rahman, vice-chancellor of the University of Liberal Arts Bangladesh (ULAB)
- Fakrul Alam, professor of English, Dhaka University

=== Business ===
- Asif Saleh, development professional, executive director of BRAC, Bangladesh
- Omar Ishrak, chairman of Intel, chairman and CEO of Medtronic
- Kazi Anis Ahmed, writer, co-founder and publisher of the Dhaka Tribune and Bangla Tribune
- Syed Almas Kabir, president of the Bangladesh Association of Software and Information Services (BASIS).

=== Entertainment ===
- Arun Saha, actor and musician
- Jeetu Ahsan, actor

=== Military ===
- Abu Mayeen Ashfakus Samad, Bangladeshi Army officer killed in the Bangladesh Liberation War
- Sayed Farooq-ur-Rahman, Lt. Col., led 15 August 1975 Bangladeshi coup d'état against Sheikh Mujibur Rahman

=== Music ===
- Shafin Ahmed, rock bassist, singer-songwriter, record producer
- George Lincoln D'Costa, singer and vocalist
- Ibrahim Ahmed Kamal, singer and member of Warfaze
- Tahsan Rahman Khan, Bangladeshi musician, actor and academic.

=== Politics ===
- Tarique Rahman, prime minister of Bangladesh (2026–present), son of former president Ziaur Rahman and the first female prime minister of Bangladesh, Khaleda Zia
- Andaleeve Rahman, member of parliament: Bhola-1, chairman of Bangladesh Jatiya Party.
- Anisul Huq, minister for law, justice and parliamentary affairs (2014–2024)

=== Sports and games ===
- Niaz Murshed, first South Asian chess grandmaster
- Reefat Bin Sattar, chess grandmaster
- Ziaur Rahman, chess grandmaster
- Shahriar Nafees, cricketer and former Twenty20 International captain for Bangladesh
