= Tamara Hasan Abed =

Bangladeshi social worker

- তামারা হাসান আবেদ
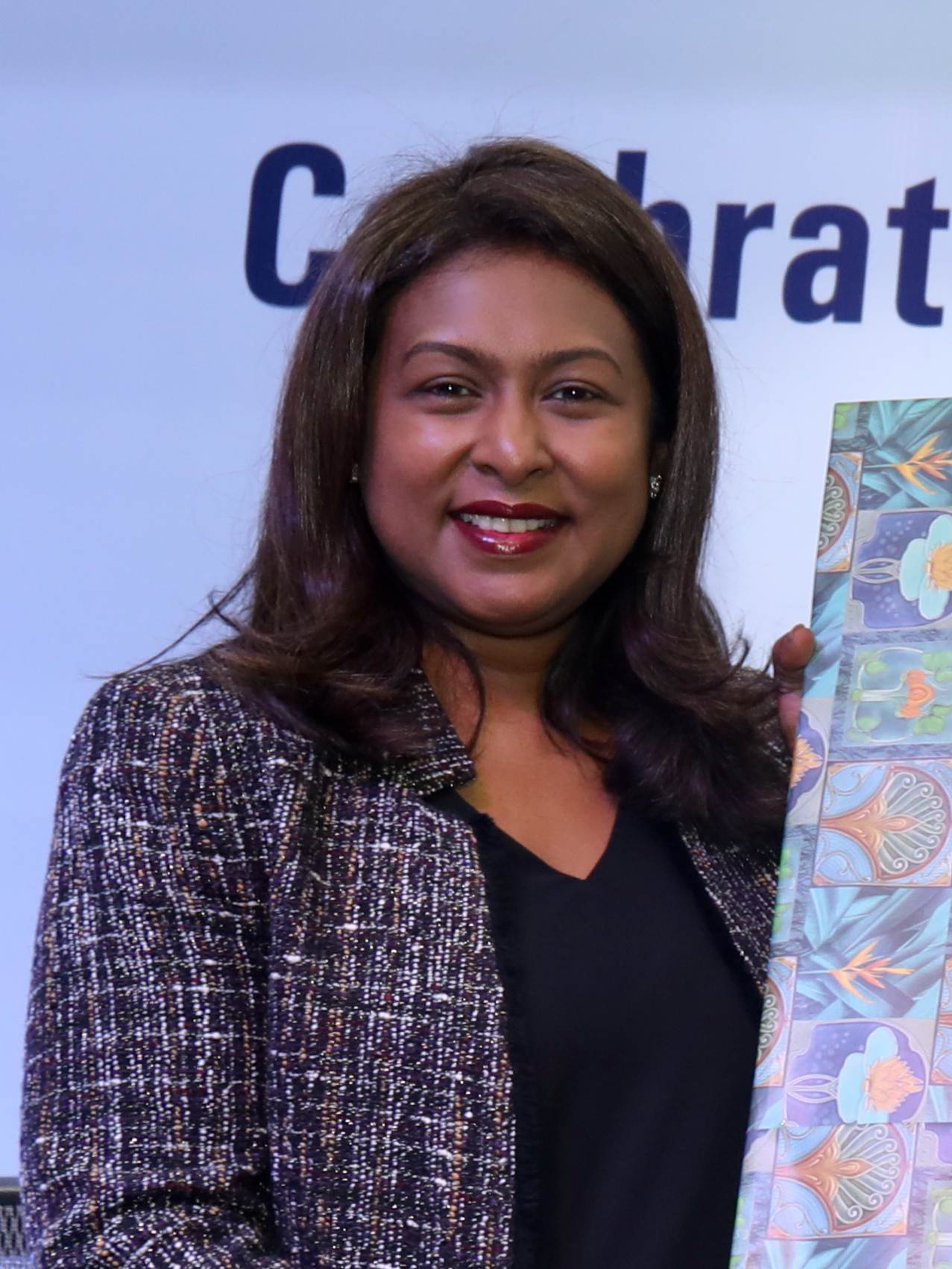
- Abed in 2022
- Born: 1974 (age 51–52); Bangladesh
- Education: Columbia Business School (MBA); London School of Economics (BSc)
- Occupations: Social worker, feminist
- Spouse: Asif Saleh
- Father: Fazle Hasan Abed

Tamara Hasan Abed is a Bangladeshi social worker and entrepreneur. She is the eldest daughter of Fazle Hasan Abed, founder and chair of BRAC.

Tamara Hasan Abed has held numerous positions within the BRAC organisation, including chair of the Board of Trustees of BRAC University, and directorships of BRAC Enterprises, BRAC IPDC, BRAC EPL Stock Brokerage Limited, BRAC EPL Investment Limited, and BRAC Bank (2008–2016). She founded the Grassroots Café in Aarong outlets, and created the Aarong sub-brands Taaga, Taaga Man, and Herstory.

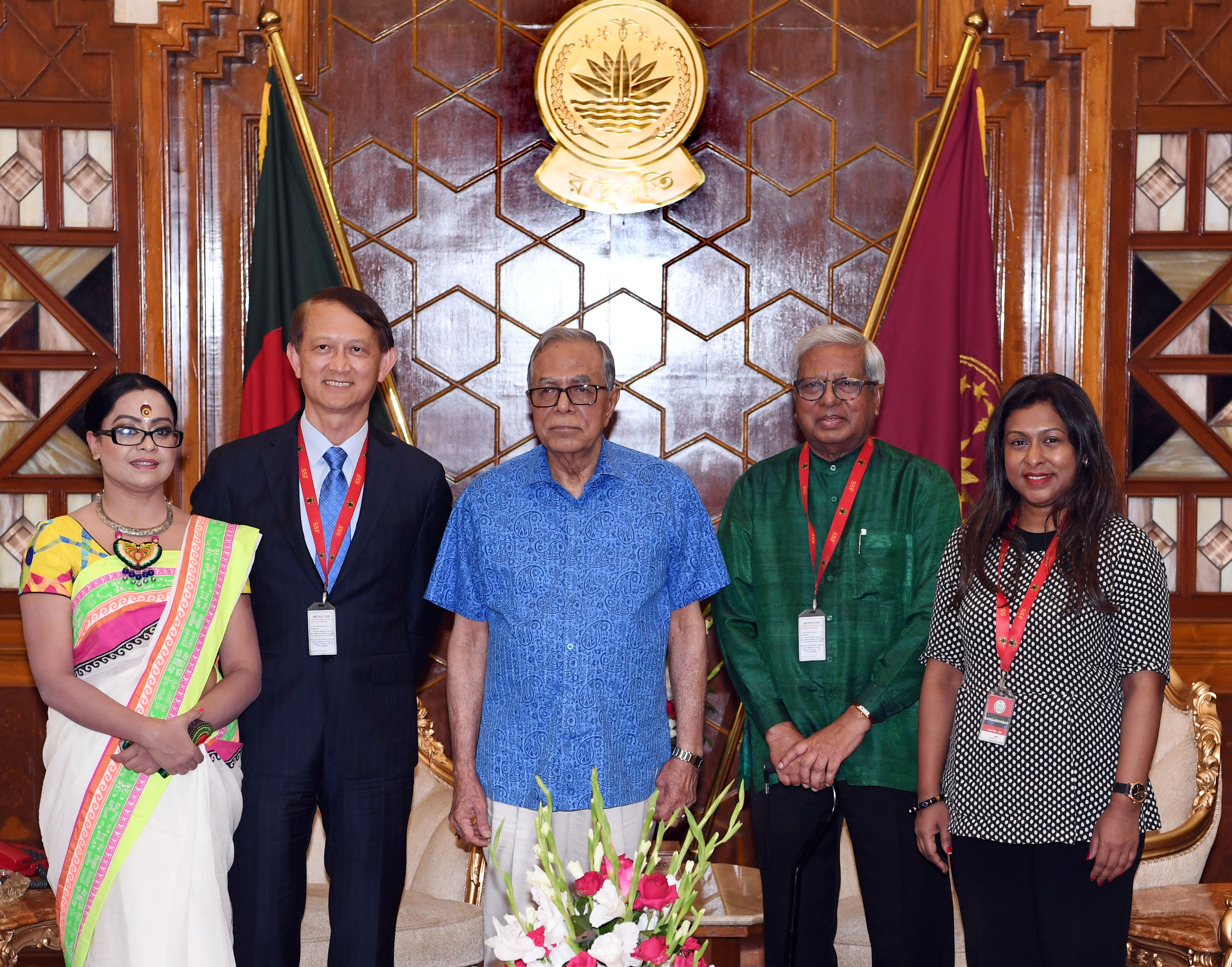
Tamara with her father and President of Bangladesh Mohammad Abdul Hamid, 2019

She also led an initiative to introduce food grade plastic for packaging dairy products in Bangladesh, and re-branded the BRAC Dairy.

== Awards ==
- In 2010, she was awarded as Young Global Leader by the World Economic Forum.
- In 2014, Tamara Abed was awarded Outstanding Women Leadership Award by the World Women Leadership Congress.
- Social Work award 2014, Canvas Freedom-Persona Aajker Nari
