= Asad Gate =

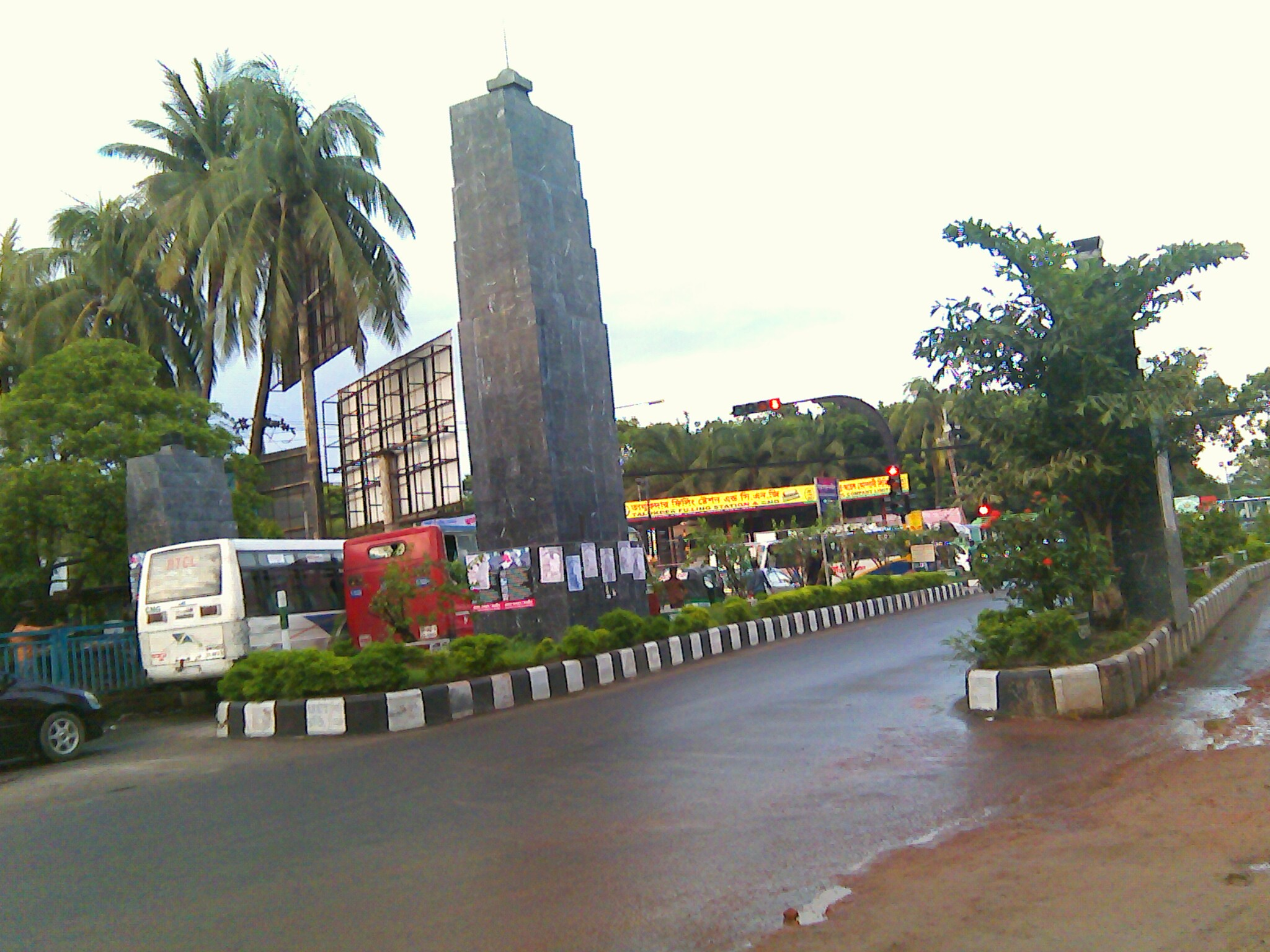
Asad Gate

Asad Gate is an archway located in Lalmatia, Dhaka, the capital of Bangladesh. According to the name of this arch, the name of that place has become Asadgate. This road goes from Asadgate to Mohammadpur. It is located on the left side of the Jatiya Sangsad Bhaban and right side of St. Joseph Higher Secondary School.

== History ==
Its former name is Ayub Gate. The President of Pakistan Ayub Khan came to Dhaka and allotted the first fifteen houses in Mohammadpur area for some families. That is why the main gate of the main road in Mohammadpur area was named Ayub Gate. Amanullah Asaduzzaman, a student leader, was killed by East Pakistan Police on 20 January 1969, in a mass movement demanding 11 points. The next day a mourning procession came out in the city. The group of procession brought the bloody shirt wore by Shaheed Asad. The angry mob then rushed to Mohammadpur. Arrived at Ayub Gate area, the angry protesters tore down the signboard of the gate and wrote Asad Gate with blood. In order to protect Assad's memory, the people of Dhaka changed the name of Ayub Gate to Asad Gate.
