= BRAC Centre =

Coordinates: 23.779826°N 90.410217°E

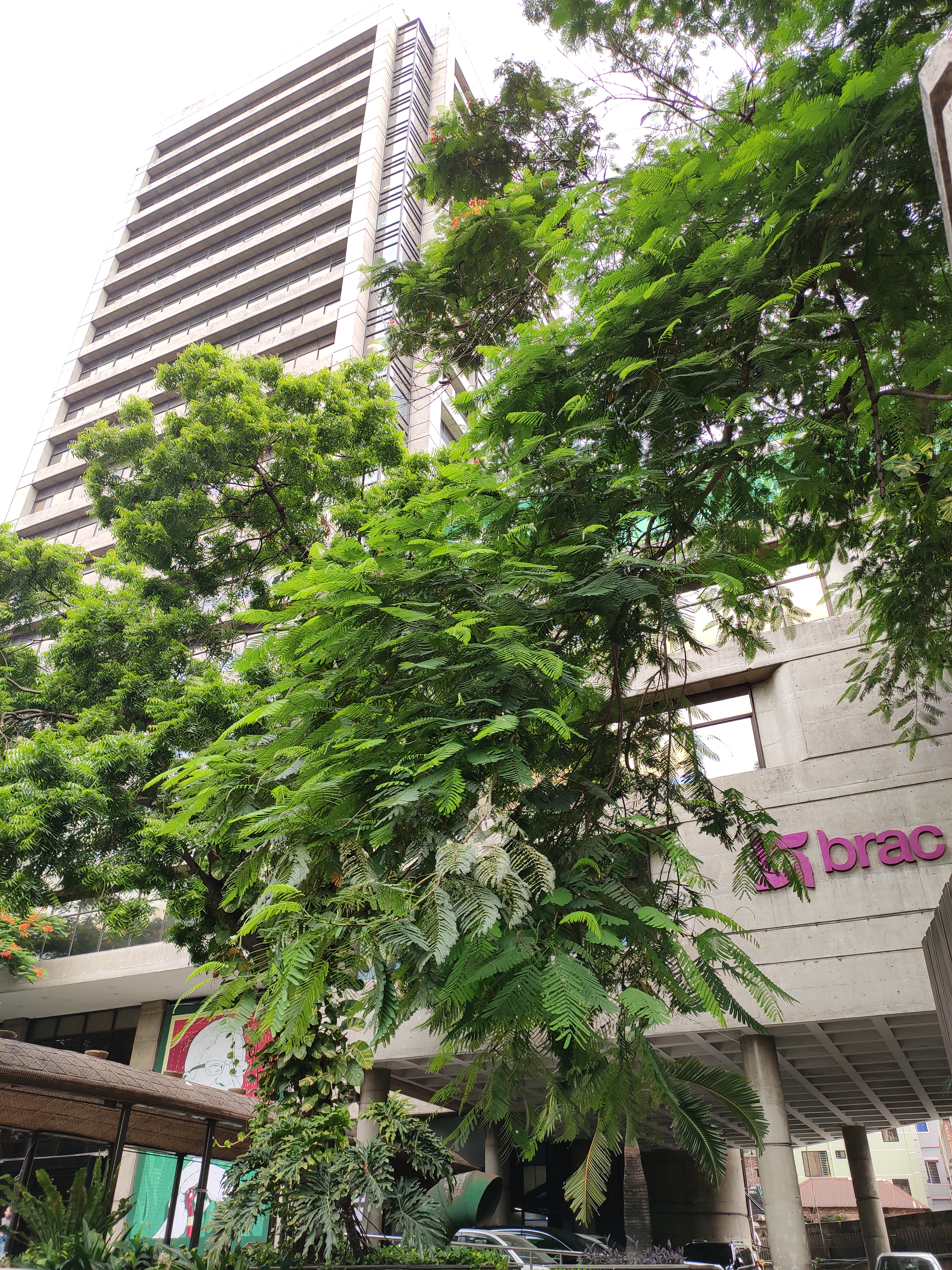
- Interactive map of the BRAC Centre area

General information
- Status: Completed
- Type: Headquarters of BRAC commercial office
- Location: Dhaka, Bangladesh, 75 Mohakhali, Dhaka-1212, Bangladesh
- Owner: BRAC

Height
- Roof: 64 meters (210 feet)
- Top floor: 21

Technical details
- Floor count: 20

BRAC Centre is a commercial-use building located in Dhaka, Bangladesh. It is one of the tallest buildings in Dhaka with a height of 64 m (210 ft).The building has 20 floors, which are used for commercial purposes. It is the main headquarters of BRAC.
