= Fazle Hasan Abed =

International development specialist (1936–2019)

Sir Fazle Hasan Abed KCMG
- ফজলে হাসান আবেদ
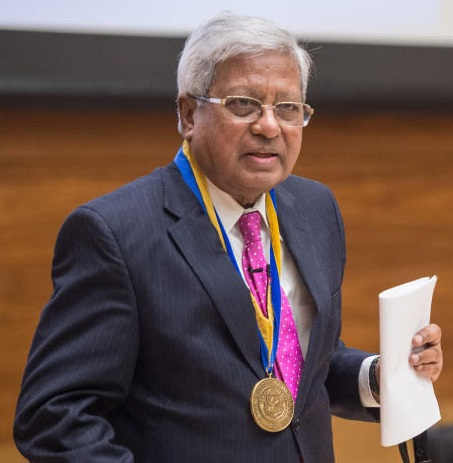
- Abed receiving the Thomas Francis Jr Medal from the University of Michigan (April 2016)
- Born: 27 April 1936; Baniachong, Assam, British India
- Died: 20 December 2019 (aged 83); Dhaka, Bangladesh
- Education: University of Glasgow
- Known for: Founder of BRAC
- Spouse: Lady Syeda Sarwat Abed
- Children: 2, including Tamara Hasan Abed
- Relatives: Syed Muazzemuddin Hossain (grandfather); Syed Misbahuddin Hussain (granduncle); Khan Bahadur Abdul Karim (great granduncle); Syed Shamsul Huda (granduncle)

Sir Fazle Hasan Abed KCMG (Bengali: ফজলে হাসান আবেদ; 27 April 1936 – 20 December 2019) was the founder of BRAC, one of the world's largest non-governmental organizations.

== Early life ==
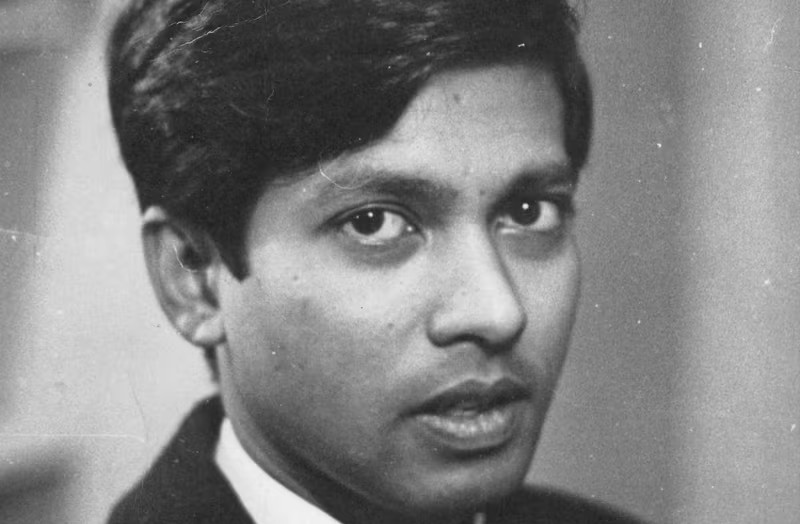
Abed in 1960s

Abed was born on 27 April 1936 in the village of Baniachong, located in what is present-day Habiganj District, Sylhet, Bangladesh. He belonged to a Bengali Muslim family of zamindars, known as the Hasan family, and was one of eight children of Siddiq Hasan and Syeda Sufia Khatun. Abed's maternal grandfather, Syed Muazzemuddin Hossain, had served successively as ministers for agriculture and education for Bengal during the last years of British rule. His paternal great-uncle was Sir Syed Shamsul Huda, a member of the Imperial Legislative Council.

Abed passed his matriculation in 1952 from Pabna Zilla School. After passing intermediate from Dhaka College, Bangladesh, in 1954, he left home at the age of 18 to attend University of Glasgow, UK where, to break away from tradition and do something radically different, he studied naval architecture. He realized there was little work in shipbuilding in East Pakistan (present day Bangladesh) and a career in naval architecture would make returning home difficult. With that in mind, Abed joined the Chartered Institute of Management Accountants in London, completing his professional education in 1962.

Abed returned to East Pakistan to join Shell Oil Company and quickly rose to head its finance division. His time at Shell exposed Abed to the inner workings of a large conglomerate providing him with insight into corporate management, which would become invaluable to him later in life.

It was during his time at Shell that the devastating cyclone of 1970 hit the south and south-eastern coastal regions of the country, killing 300,000 people. The cyclone had a profound effect on Abed. In the face of such devastation, he said the comforts and perks of a corporate executive's life ceased to attract him. With friends, Abed created HELP, an organisation that provided relief and rehabilitation to the worst affected in the island of Manpura, which had lost three-quarters of its population in the disaster.

Soon after, Bangladesh's own struggle for independence from Pakistan began and circumstances forced Abed to leave the country. He found refuge in the United Kingdom, where he set up Action Bangladesh to lobby the governments of Europe for his country's independence.

== Formation of BRAC ==
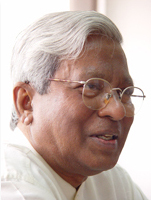
Fazle Hasan Abed in the mid-2000s

When the Bangladesh Liberation War ended in December 1971, Abed sold his flat in London and returned to the newly independent Bangladesh. Hundreds of refugees who had sought shelter in India during the war had started to return home, and their relief and rehabilitation called for urgent efforts. Abed decided to use the funds he had generated from selling his flat to initiate an organisation to deal with the long-term task of improving the living conditions of the rural poor. He selected the remote region of Sulla in northeastern Bangladesh to start his work, and this work led to the non-governmental organisation known as BRAC in 1972.

BRAC grew to become one of the largest development organisations in the world in terms of the scale and diversity of its interventions. The organization now operates in all 64 Bangladeshi districts through development interventions ranging from education, healthcare, microfinance, skills, human rights, agriculture and enterprise development. In 2002, BRAC went international by taking its range of development interventions to Afghanistan. Since then, BRAC has expanded to 10 countries across Asia and Africa, successfully adapting its unique integrated development model across varying geographic and socioeconomic contexts. It is now considered the world's largest non-profit organization – both by employees and people served.

== Professional positions ==
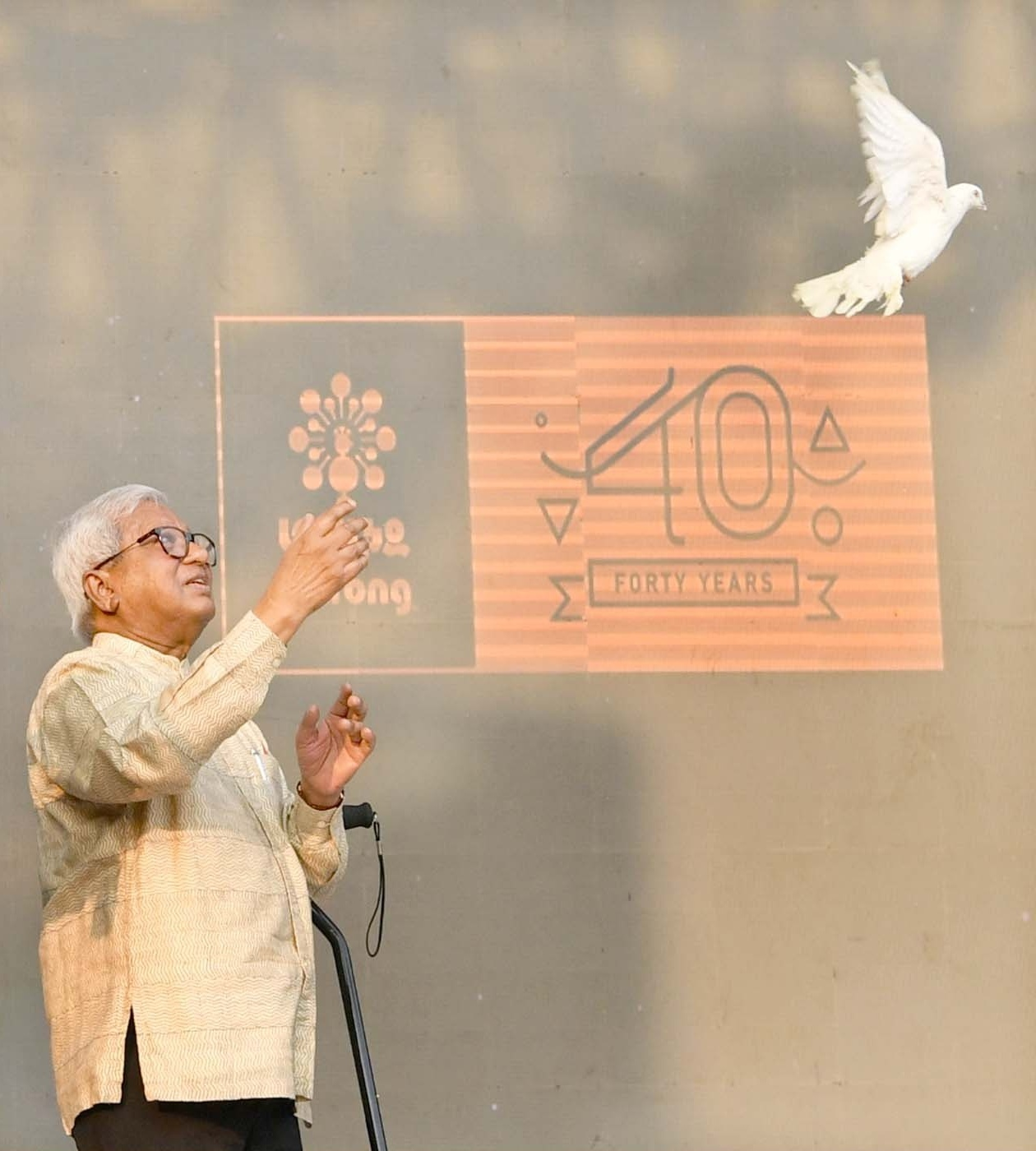
Abed inaugurating the 40 years anniversary program of Aarong in 2018

Abed held the following positions:

- 1972–2001 – Executive Director, BRAC
- 1981–1982 – Visiting Scholar, Harvard Institute of International Development, Harvard University, Cambridge, Mass.
- 1982–1986 – Senior Fellow, Bangladesh Institute of Development Studies (BIDS).
- 1982–1986 – Member, Board of Trustees, BIDS.
- 1982–1986 – Chairperson, Association of Development Agencies in Bangladesh (ADAB).
- 1986–1991 – Member, World Bank NGO Committee, Geneva, Switzerland.
- 1987–1990 – Chairperson, South Asia Partnership.
- 1987–1990 – Member, International Commission on Health Research for Development, Harvard University, Cambridge, Massachusetts, USA
- 1990–2009 – Chairperson, 'Campaign for Popular Education' (CAMPE), an NGO network on education.
- 1992–1993 – Member, Independent South Asian Commission on Poverty Alleviation
- 1992–2009 – Chairperson, NGO Forum for Drinking Water Supply & Sanitation
- 1993–2011 – Chairperson, Ain O Salish Kendra (ASK), a human rights organisation
- 1994–2019 – Member, Board of Trustees, Centre for Policy Dialogue (CPD), Dhaka
- 1998–2004 – Member, Board of Governors, Institute of Development Studies (IDS), Sussex University, UK
- 1998–2005 – Member, Policy Advisory Group, The Consultative Group to Assist the Poorest (CGAP), The World Bank, Washington, DC.
- 1999–2005 – Member, Board of Governors, International Rice Research Institute (IRRI), Los Banos, Philippines.
- 2000–2005 – Chair, Finance & Audit Committee, International Rice Research Institute (IRRI), Los Banos, Philippines.
- 2000–2019 – Chairperson, Governing Body, BRAC.
- 2001–2008 – Chairperson, Board of Directors, BRAC Bank Limited.
- 2001–2019 – Chairperson, Board of Trustees, BRAC University.
- 2002–2008 – Global Chairperson, International Network of Alternative Financial Institutions (INAFI) International.
- 2005–2019 – Commissioner, UN Commission on Legal Empowerment of the Poor (CLEP)
- 2010–2011 – UN Secretary General's Group of Eminent Persons for Least Developed Countries (LDCs)
- 2012–2019 – Member, UN Secretary General's Lead Group of the Scaling Up Nutrition (SUN) Movement
- 2015–2015 – Chairperson, Board of Directors, BRAC Saajan Exchange Limited
- 2015–2019 – Chairperson, Advisory Board, Bengal Institute for Architecture, Landscapes and Settlements.

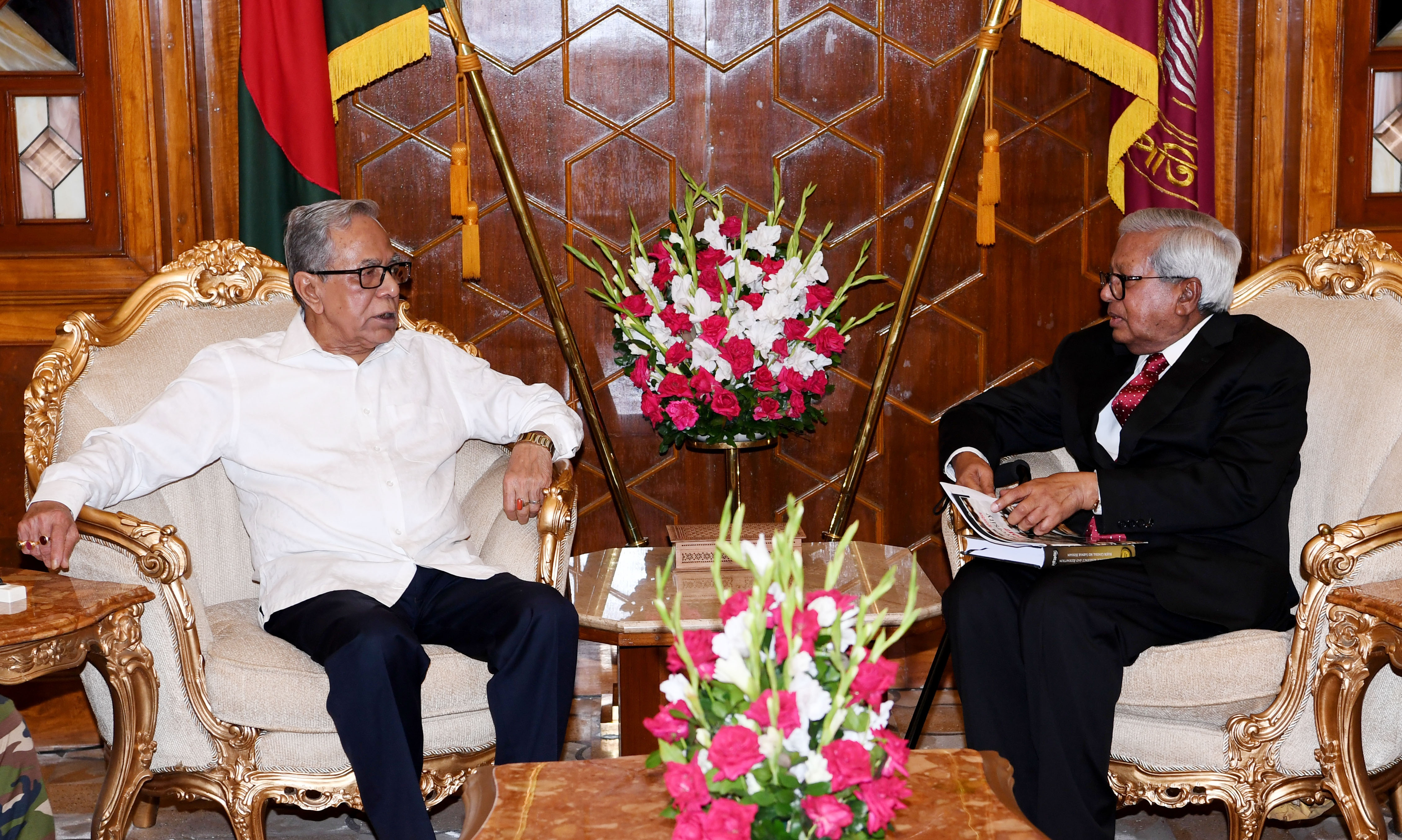
Abed with President Mohammad Abdul Hamid at Bangabhaban, 2018

== Awards ==
- The Ramon Magsaysay Award for Community Leadership, 1980
- The Alan Shawn Feinstein World Hunger Award, 1990
- The Maurice Pate Award by UNICEF, 1992
- The Olof Palme Prize, 2001
- The Social Entrepreneurship Award by the Schwab Foundation, 2002
- The International Activist Award by the Gleitsman Foundation, 2004
- The UNDP Mahbub ul Haq Award, 2004
- The Henry R. Kravis Prize in Nonprofit Leadership, 2007
- The Inaugural Clinton Global Citizen Award, 2007
- Palli Karma Shahayak Foundation (PKSF) Lifetime Achievement in Social Development and Poverty Alleviation, 2007
- The David Rockefeller Bridging Leadership Award, 2007
- Knight Commander of the Order of St Michael and St George (KCMG), 2010
- The WISE Prize for Education, 2011
- Open Society Prize, 2013
- Leo Tolstoy International Gold Medal by The Russian Children Foundation (RDF), 2014
- World Food Prize, 2015
- Thomas Francis, Jr. Medal in Global Public Health, 2016
- Jose Edgardo Campos Collaborative Leadership Award 2016 (South Asian Region), 2017
- Laudato Si' Award (Institution Category), 2017
- LEGO Prize, 2018
- Yidan Prize for Education Development, 2019
- Independence Award (2025)

== Honorary degrees ==
- 1994 – Honorary Doctorate of Laws, Queen's University, Canada
- 2003 – Honorary Doctorate of Education, University of Manchester, UK
- 2007 – Honorary Doctorate of Humane Letters, Yale University, US
- 2008 – Honorary Doctorate of Laws, Columbia University, US
- 2009 – Honorary Doctorate of Letters, University of Oxford, UK
- 2009 – Honorary Doctorate in Humane letters, Rikkyo University, Japan
- 2010 – Honorary degree of Doctor of Laws, University of Bath, UK
- 2012 – Doctor of Laws honoris causa, University of Manchester, UK
- 2014 – Honorary Degree of Doctor of Civil Law, Sewanee: The University of the South, US
- 2014 – Honorary Doctor of Laws, Princeton University, US
- 2016 – Honorary Degree of Doctor of Education, University of Bradford, UK

== Death ==
Abed was admitted to the hospital in late November 2019 on account of breathing problems and physical weakness. He died at the Apollo Hospital (now Evercare Hospital Dhaka) in the capital on Friday, 20 December 2019. He was undergoing treatment for a malignant brain tumor. At the time of his death, he was 83 years old. He is survived by a wife, a daughter, a son and three grandchildren. Following a namaz-e-janaza at the Army Stadium, Abed was buried at Banani graveyard in Dhaka on 22 December 2019.
