= Asif Saleh =

Executive Director of BRAC Bangladesh

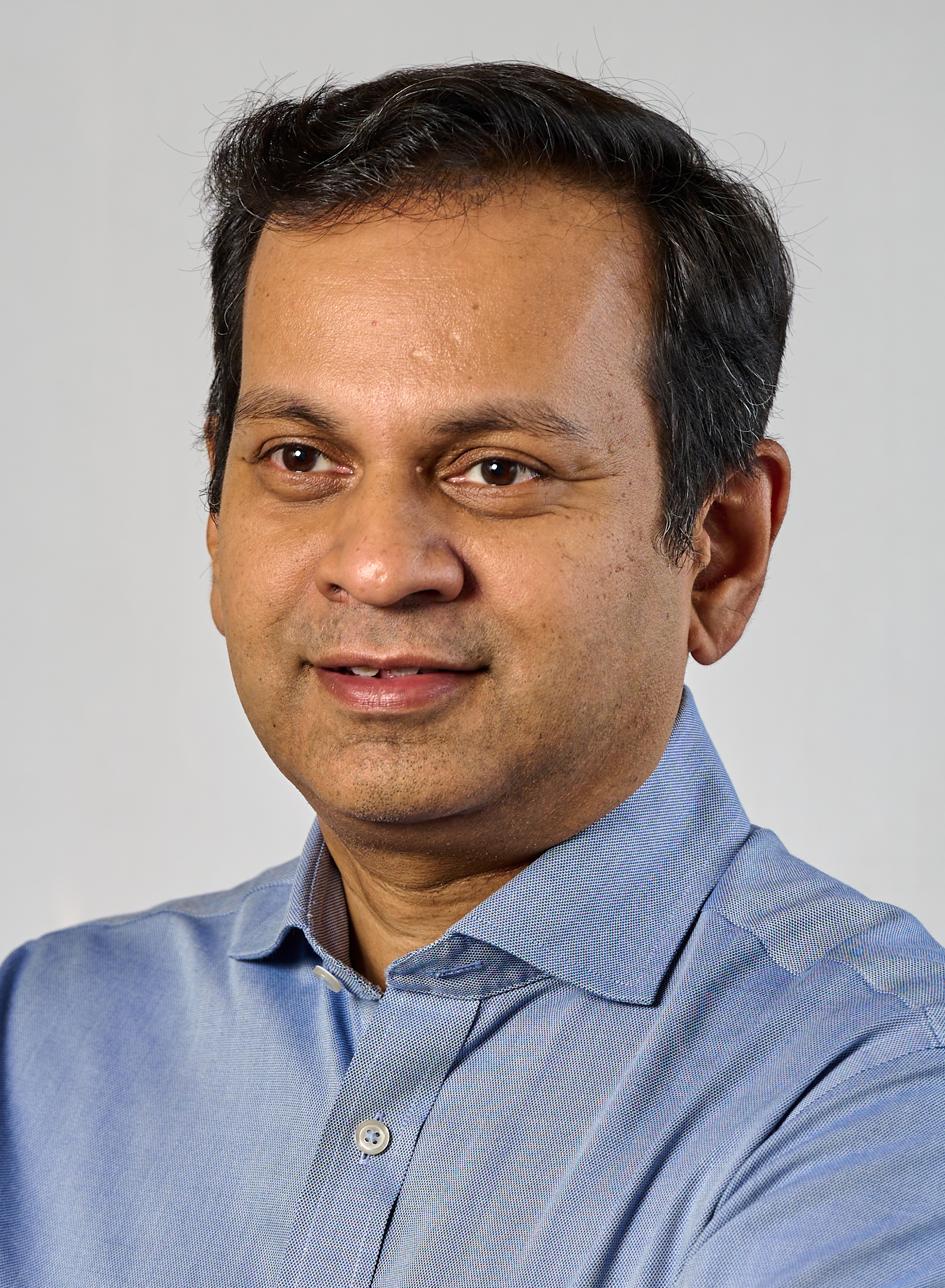
- Asif Saleh in 2022
- Education: St. Joseph Higher Secondary School North Carolina State University (Bachelor of Computer Science); New York University Stern School of Business (MBA)
- Title: Executive Director of BRAC
- Board member of: BRAC Bank Limited, BKash, edotco Bangladesh Ltd.
- Spouse: Tamara Hasan Abed
- Children: 2
- Awards: Asia 21 by Asia Society (2008); Young Global Leader by the World Economic Forum (2013)

Asif Saleh is a Bangladeshi development professional. He is the current executive director of BRAC, Bangladesh. one of the world's largest development organisations. Saleh has been instrumental in the growth of BRAC, which operates across Asia and Africa, focusing on areas such as poverty reduction, and climate change.

== Education ==
Saleh attended the New York University Leonard N. Stern School of Business from 2000 to 2003 and obtained a Master of Business Administration in Marketing and Management. Before that, he attended North Carolina State University from 1992 to 1996 and earned a bachelor's degree in Computer Science. He studied at St. Joseph Higher Secondary School from 1981 to 1989.

== Career ==
Asif Saleh worked at Goldman Sachs for 12 years, ending his term as an executive director. Prior to that, he worked at Glaxo Wellcome, NorTel, and IBM. In 2001, Saleh founded Drishtipat, which supported members of the Bangladeshi community living outside Bangladesh to support social development in Bangladesh.

He joined the Access to Information (A2i) Program of UNDP at the Bangladesh Prime Minister's Office in 2010, leading the policy effort to expand affordable broadband connectivity across Bangladesh. He joined BRAC as a Director in 2011, and in 2012 he was made a senior director. In 2019, he was appointed as the executive director of BRAC Bangladesh.

Saleh chairs BRAC IT Services Limited, BRAC Kumon Limited and is on the Board of BRAC Bank, bKash, and edotco Bangladesh Ltd. He is the board chair of non-profit organisations Bangladesh Institute of Informatics and Development (IID).

Saleh is a non-resident fellow at the Center for Global Development in Washington. the global board for Generation Unlimited, a member of the global governing council of Water Resource Group 2030 and a member of World Economic Forum's Global Future Council on Reimagining Aid for 2025–2026.

== Awards and recognition ==
Saleh was recognised by Asia Society's Asia 21 program in 2008, the Bangladeshi American Foundation in 2007, selected as an Asia 21 Fellow in 2012 and as a Young Global Leader by the World Economic Forum in 2013. In 2026, Saleh was named one of the TIME 100 Most Influential People in Philanthropy 2026, which recognises the world’s 100 most influential individuals shaping the future of giving and social impact. He was selected in the Leaders category for advancing BRAC’s locally-led development model and championing a more equitable and sustainable approach to international aid.
