= Mohammad Mozammel Haq =

Bengali politician

Maulvi Mohammad Mozammel Haq
- মোহাম্মদ মোজাম্মেল হক

Member of the Bengal Legislative Assembly
- In office 1937–1945
- Succeeded by: Khan Bahadur Nuruzzaman
- Constituency: Bhola North

Personal details
- Born: 6 September 1883 Bhola, Backergunge District, Bengal Presidency
- Died: August 1, 1976 (aged 92) Bangladesh
- Party: Krishak Praja Party
- Education: Presidency College Calcutta; Mitra Institution

Mohammad Mozammel Haq (Bengali: মোহাম্মদ মোজাম্মেল হক; 6 September 1883 – 1 August 1976) was a Bengali politician, lawyer, poet, philanthropist and litterateur. He served as a chief whip of the Bengal Legislative Assembly.

== Early life and education ==
Haq was born on 6 September 1883 to a Bengali family of Muslim Munshis in the village of Bapta on Bhola Island off the coast of Backergunge District, Bengal Presidency. He was the son of Munshi Abdul Karim. He passed his matriculation from the Mitra Institution in Calcutta in 1901. Haq completed his Intermediate of Arts from the Presidency College Calcutta. Having graduated with a degree in 1912 and Bachelor of Laws later, he was the third Bholan Islander to graduate ever.

== Career ==
Haq initially trained as a lawyer, but freed himself from what was considered the shirki nature of the legal system. In 1909, he published his first poetry book Jatiya Mangal. He then became influenced by Maulana Maniruzzaman Islamabadi and started writing Islamic poetry. Some of his other works include Samaj Mangal (50 poems), Manav Mangal, Utthan Sangeet and a poetic translation of 10 paras of the Qur'an. He wrote poems for Islamabadi's weekly Soltan and Muhammad Reazuddin Ahmad's monthly Islam Pracharak and weekly Mohammadi magazines.

Haq singlehandedly established 10 high schools and three senior madrasas on the island of Bhola. In 1911, he co-founded as general secretary the Bangiya Mussalman Sahitya Samiti and Library in Calcutta in response to the Bangiya Sahitya Parishat. From 1918, the trimonthly Bangiya Mussalman Sahitya Patrika would be published, and he served as its joint editor. Although Muhammad Shahidullah edited it initially, Haq served as editor for five consecutive years. It was under him, that Qazi Nazrul Islam's first work Kkhoma sent over from Karachi was published. After the disbandment of the Bengali Regiment, Nazrul joined this society and magazine office himself. Through Haq's efforts, the Mussulman Student Society was founded in 1915 and he served as its general secretary until 1919. In 1921, he founded The Oriental Printers and Publishers and 32 books were published from here including that of Nazrul's.

Haq served as a member of the Barisal District Education Board for 27 years. He served as a member of the Calcutta Hajj Committee and Calcutta Textbook Committee for 12 years and Bengal Primary Education Committee for three years. Haq contested in the 1937 Bengal legislative elections, winning in the Bhola North constituency. Haq became the assembly's chief whip. He established the status of the mother tongue by speaking in Bengali instead of English in the Legislative Assembly. He joined the All-India Muslim League and supported the incorporation of Sylhet into Pakistan. In 1918, he founded the Khademul Islam social services organisation. The Barisal Muslim Student Society was also founded through his initiative.

== Death ==
Haq died on 1 August 1976 in Bangladesh. His son, Mohammad Mokammel Haq, was a former secretary at the Ministry of Land and later the executive chairman of Board of Investment.
