= Parveen Mahmud =

Parveen Mahmud is a Bangladeshi businesswoman and social worker. She is the chairperson of the Underprivileged Children Education Program. She is a member of the governing body of the Palli Karma Sahayak Foundation. She is a trustee of Transparency International Bangladesh. She is an independent director of Marico Bangladesh.

== Career ==
Mahmud was the managing director of Palli Karma Sahayak Foundation from 2004 to 2006.

Mahmud was awarded the Begum Rokeya award in 2006. In December 2007, she was re-elected to the board of directors of MIDAS Financing Limited. She was the acting chairperson of the Acid Survivors Foundation in May 2009. She was the vice-chairperson of the Underprivileged Children Education Program in 2010. She was the chairman of the Acid Survivors Foundation in 2010.

Mahmud was the first woman to be elected president of The Institute of Chartered Accountants of Bangladesh in 2011. Mahmud was the founding managing director of Grameen Telecom Trust. She is a director of Centre for Policy Dialogue and Manusher Jonnyo Foundation. She is a director of Linde Bangladesh.

In December 2018, Mahmud was elected chairman of the Underprivileged Children Education Program. She is the chairperson of Shasha Denims Limited. In February 2018, she announced plans to buy a 40 per cent stake in EOS Textile Limited. Mahmud, then chairperson of MIDAS Financing Limited, was made a trustee of Transparency International Bangladesh in June. Mahmud was awarded the Anannya Top Ten Awards in 2018.

In May 2019, Mahmud was appointed an independent director of Berger Paints Bangladesh. On 15 April 2019, she left the post of the managing director of Grameen Telecom Trust. Mahmud, managing director of Shasha Garments, announced plans to invest five million USD in the Dhaka Export Processing Zone. In March 2023, she was elected chairman of the board of trustees of RDRS Bangladesh. Mahmud joined the board of directors of MIDAS Financing Limited in April 2023. She is an executive member of Friendship (NGO).
