= Aarong =

Bangladeshi department stores chain

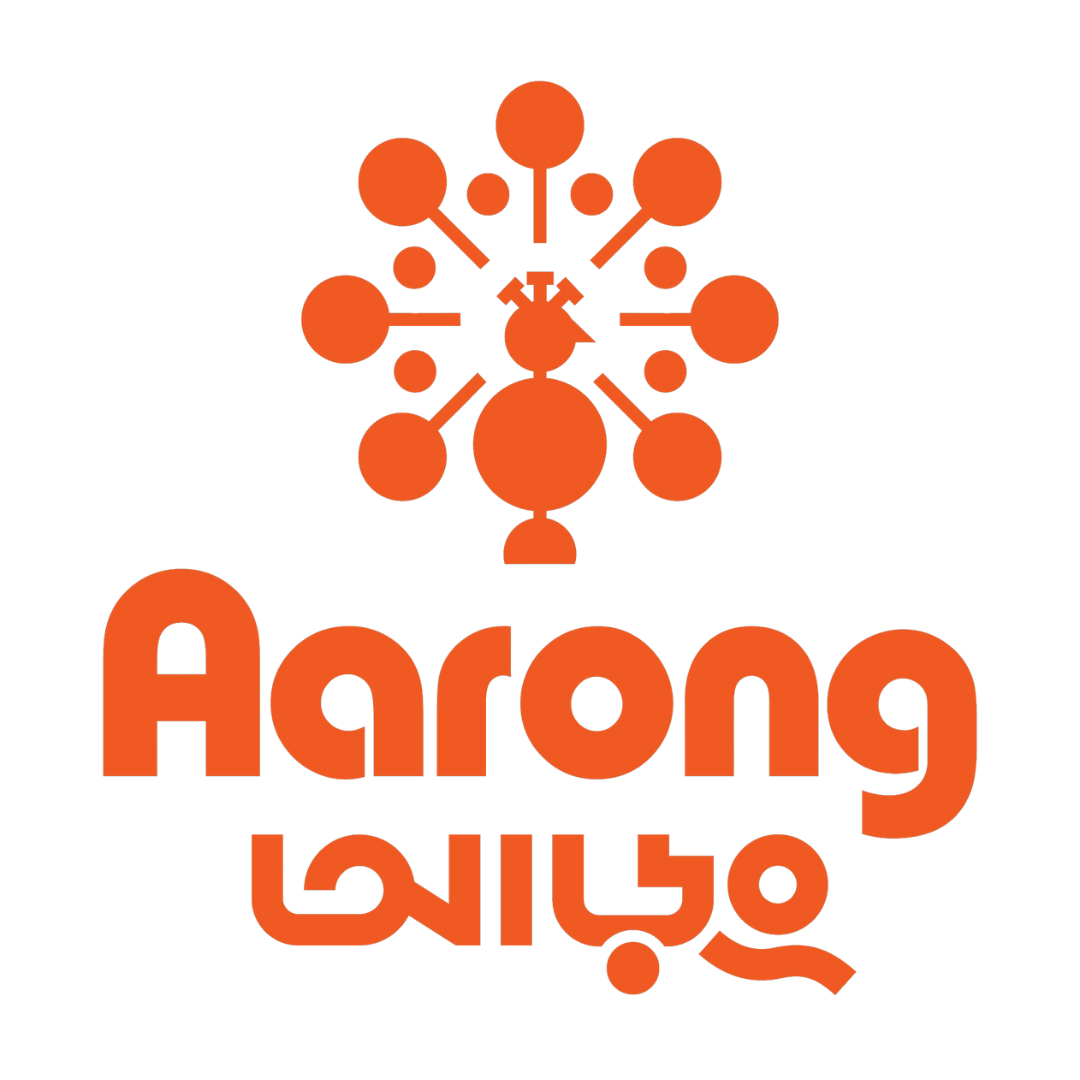
- Type: Retail Fashion Brand
- Industry: Design, sales of clothing, accessories, jewellery, home goods, development, economic empowerment of women
- Founded: Dhaka, Bangladesh (18 December 1978)
- Founder: Ayesha Abed; Martha Chen
- Headquarters: Dhaka, Bangladesh
- Area served: Bangladesh
- Key people: Tamara Hasan Abed (Managing Director)
- Products: Clothing; Jewellery; Fabric; Non-textile craft Leather goods Footwear; Housewares
- Revenue: ▲US 350 million (2018)
- Parent: BRAC
- Website: www.aarong.com

Aarong (Bengali: আড়ং, lit. 'Village Fair') is a social enterprise chain of Bangladeshi department stores specializing in Bengali ethnic wear and handicrafts. It is owned by the non-profit development agency BRAC, and employs thousands of rural artisans across the country. It currently operates twenty-nine outlets in nine Bangladeshi metropolitan cities.

== Products ==
Aarong's product line includes:

- Aarong Dairy has 24 percent market share of liquid milk in Bangladesh as of 2021.
- Aarong Earth
- Aarong Natural
- BRAC Nursery
- BRAC Recycled Handmade Paper
- Grassroots Café

== Aarong outlets ==
As of 2024, Aarong has 29 outlets in major cities across Bangladesh, including Dhaka, Chittagong, Sylhet , Rajshahi, Mymensingh and Khulna.

In 2025, Aarong expanded further with two major outlets. A new 60,000-square-foot flagship store opened in Dhanmondi, Dhaka, becoming the largest craft store in the world. The eight-storey outlet includes a monumental Nakshi Kantha display, a dedicated children's playpen, and a future in-house restaurant named "The Orange Parrot." In the same year, Aarong also opened its 30th outlet in Maijdee, Noakhali, featuring four floors of retail space and multiple sub-brands, including TAAGA, TAAGA MAN, and Aarong Earth.

== E-commerce and digital expansion ==
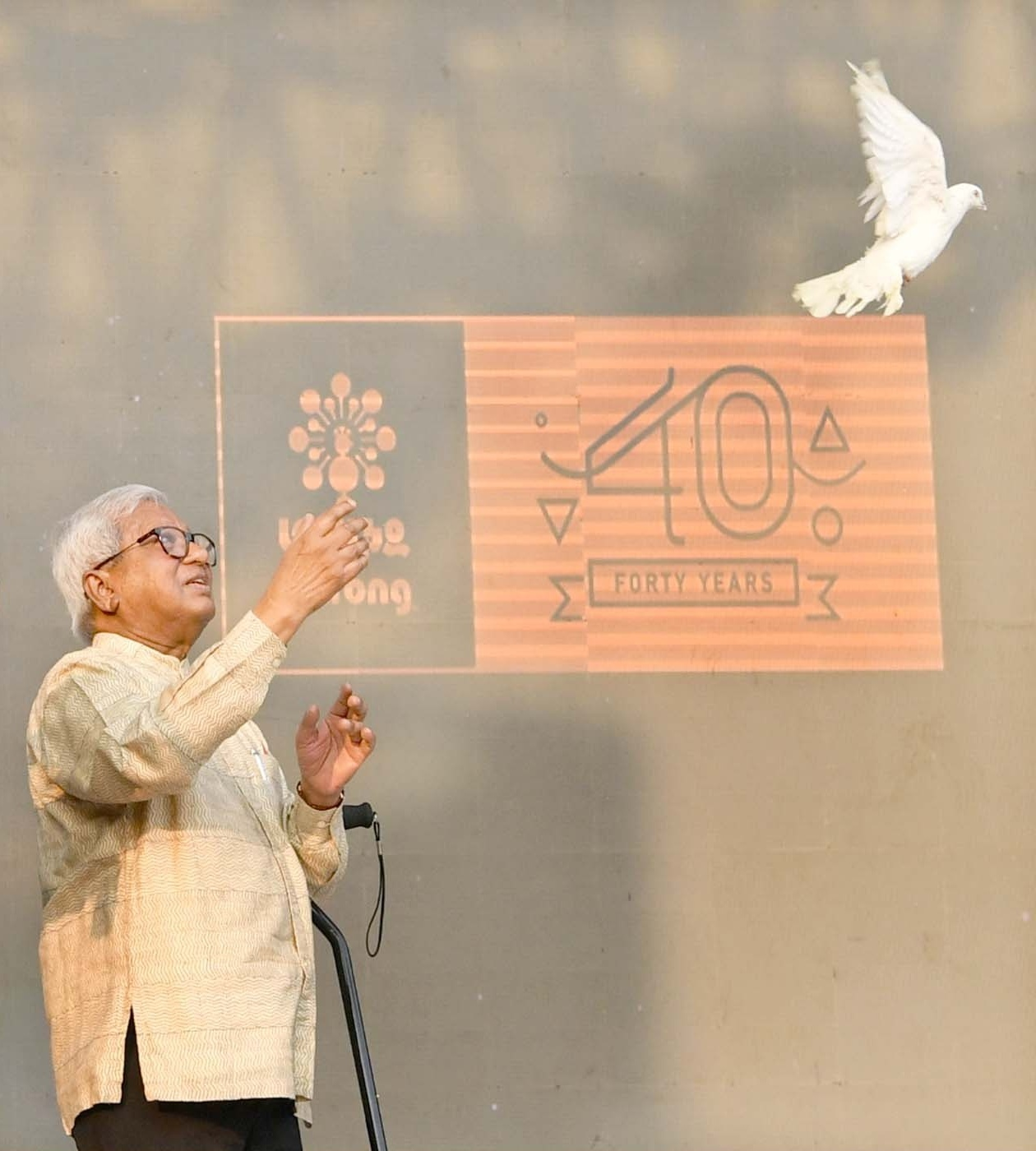
Fazle Hasan Abed inaugurating the 40-year anniversary program of Aarong in 2018

In response to changing consumer behavior and the rise of online shopping, Aarong launched its official e-commerce platform in 2014. The online store offers a wide selection of Aarong's products, including clothing, home décor, accessories, and gifts, delivering nationwide across Bangladesh.

During the COVID-19 pandemic, Aarong's digital presence became a vital retail channel, experiencing significant growth in online traffic and sales. To further enhance customer convenience, Aarong introduced a mobile app, improved digital payment options, and added services such as store pickup and home delivery.

As of 2025, Aarong continues to invest in digital transformation, including mobile-optimized web platforms, virtual styling tools, and data-driven customer engagement strategies. These efforts have helped Aarong expand its reach beyond physical outlets and appeal to younger, tech-savvy consumers across the country.

== Controversies ==
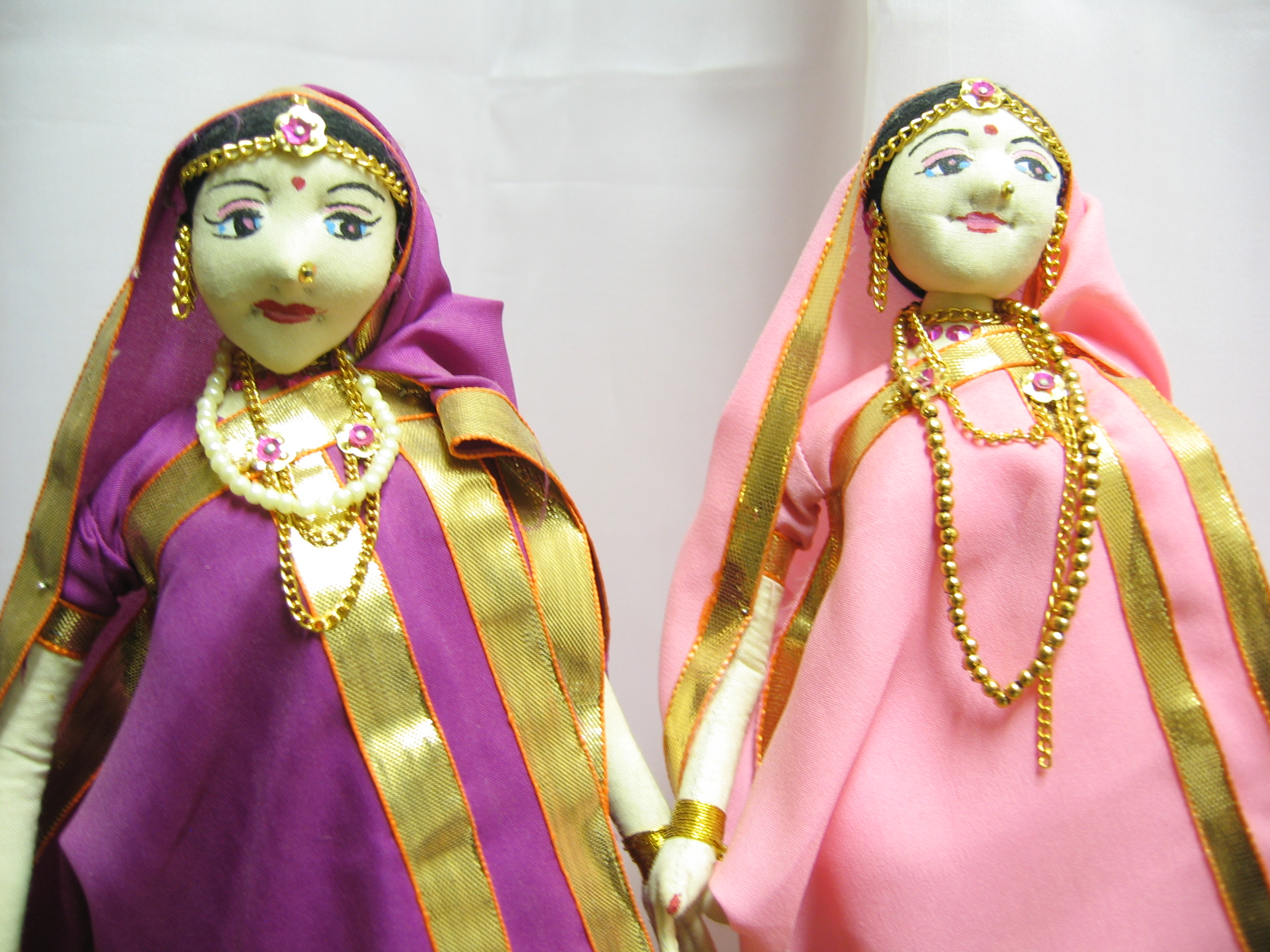
Zamindar ginny dolls on sale at an Aarong store

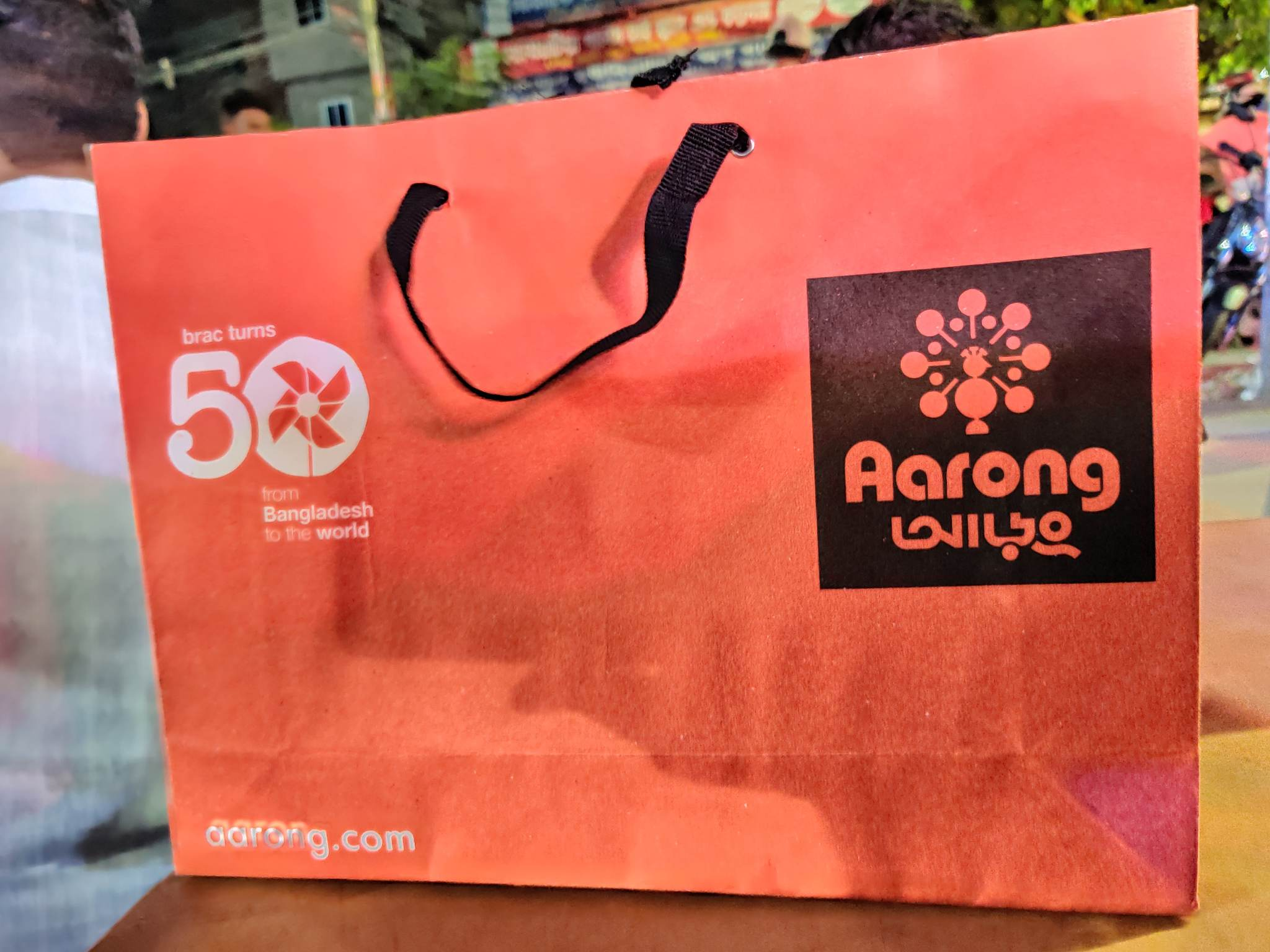
Shopping bag of Aarong

The Directorate of National Consumer Rights Protection (DNCRP) fined the Uttara outlet of Aarong Tk4.5 lakh and closed it for a day for selling the same products at double price within a gap of five days. Following a client's complaint that Aarong was selling a panjabi after nearly doubling its price, DNCRP officials visited the chain's flagship store on Jashimuddin Avenue at Uttara on 31 May 2019 and fined them after finding the allegation to be true.

Historian Taj Hashmi has criticized BRAC's projects for exploiting the cheap labour of rural women and children. An embroidered saree retailed at Aarong for 6,000 Bangladeshi taka ($120 as of 2000), for example, earned the embroiderer only 300 taka (less than $7).
