= BRAC (organisation) =

International development organization based in Bangladesh

- Predecessor: Bangladesh Rehabilitation Assistance Committee; Bangladesh Rural Advancement Committee; Building Resources Across Communities
- Formation: 21 March 1972
- Founder: Sir Fazle Hasan Abed
- Type: Non-profit
- Purpose: International development
- Headquarters: BRAC Centre, 75 Mohakhali, Dhaka, Bangladesh
- Key people: Asif Saleh (Executive Director, BRAC); Shameran Abed (Executive Director, BRAC International)
- Revenue: ▲৳6053.7 crore (US$490 million) (2016)
- Expenses: ▲৳4323.3 crore (US$350 million) (2016)
- Staff: 97,742 (2016)
- Website: brac.net

BRAC is an international development organisation based in Bangladesh. In order to receive foreign donations, BRAC was subsequently registered under the NGO Affairs Bureau of the Government of Bangladesh. BRAC is the largest non-governmental development organisation in the world, in terms of the number of employees, as of September 2016. Founded by Sir Fazle Hasan Abed in 1972, shortly after the independence of Bangladesh, BRAC now operates in all 64 districts of Bangladesh and in 16 other countries across Asia, Africa, and the Americas.

BRAC states that it employs over 90,000 people, roughly 70 percent of whom are women, and that it reaches more than 126 million people with its services. BRAC has operations in 12 countries.

== History ==
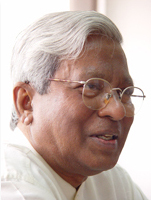
Sir Fazle Hasan Abed, founder of BRAC

Known formerly as the Bangladesh Rehabilitation Assistance Committee, then as the Bangladesh Rural Advancement Committee, and later as Building Resources Across Communities, BRAC was initiated in 1972 by Sir Fazle Hasan Abed at Shallah Upazillah in the district of Sunamganj as a large scale relief and rehabilitation project to help returning war refugees after the Bangladesh Liberation War of 1971.

Until the mid-1970s, BRAC concentrated on community development through village development programmes that included agriculture, fisheries, cooperatives, rural crafts, adult literacy, health and family planning, vocational training for women, and the construction of community centres. A Research and Evaluation Division (RED) was set up to evaluate its activities and decide direction, and in 1977, BRAC began taking a more targeted approach by creating Village Organisations (VO) to assist the landless, small farmers, artisans, and vulnerable women. That same year, BRAC set up a commercial printing press to help finance its activities. The handicraft retail chain called Aarong was established the following year.

In the late 1970s, diarrhoea was a leading cause of child mortality in Bangladesh. In February 1979, BRAC began a field trial in two villages of what was then Sulla thana, of a campaign to combat diarrhoea. The following year, they scaled up the operation and named it the Oral Therapy Extension Programme (OTEP). It taught rural mothers in their homes how to prepare an oral rehydration solution (ORS) from readily available ingredients and how to use it to treat diarrhoea. The training was reinforced with posters and radio and TV spots.

The ten-year programme taught 12 million households spread over 75,000 villages in every part of Bangladesh except the Chittagong Hill Tracts (which were unsafe to work in because of civil unrest). Fifteen years after they were taught, the vast majority of mothers could still prepare a safe and effective ORS. The treatment was little known in Bangladesh when OTEP began, but 15 years later it was used in rural households for severe diarrhoea more than 80% of the time, one of the highest rates in the world.

Non Formal Primary Education was started by BRAC in 1985.

In 1979, BRAC started a Rural Development Programme (RDP). This was intended to give members access to credit and to savings facilities. The programme involved considerable growth in the number of people who were members of BRAC: in 1989, three years after the start of the Rural Development Programme, there were 350,000 members, and by 1995 there were 1.2 to 1.5 million members. An evaluation by the United Kingdom Department for International Development in 1998 found that the programme had been successful, though not all the aims were achieved. BRAC's own evaluation in 1996 found "gradual improvements in the indicators such as wealth, revenue earning assets, the value of house structure, the level of cash earned, per capita expenditure on food, total household expenditure", but hoped-for improvements in village self-management had not taken place, and the drop-out rate of members was high.

In 1991, the Women's Health Development programme commenced. The following year, BRAC established a Centre for Development Management (CDM) in Rajendrapur.

BRAC opened an Information Technology Institute in 1999.

In 2001, BRAC established a university in the city of Dhaka, Bangladesh, called BRAC University.

== Programmes ==
BRAC has done what few others have – they have achieved success on a massive scale, bringing life-saving health programs to millions of the world's poorest people. They remind us that even the most intractable health problems are solvable, and inspire us to match their success throughout the developing world.

— Bill Gates, Co-chair, Bill & Melinda Gates Foundation Global Health Award, 2004

=== Economic development ===
Microfinance, introduced in 1974, is BRAC's oldest programme. It spans all districts of Bangladesh. It provides collateral-free loans to mostly poor, landless, rural women, enabling them to generate income and improve their standards of living. BRAC's microfinance program is estimated to give out around the equivalent of one billion dollars a year in loans.

BRAC founded its retail outlet, Aarong (Bengali for "village fair") in 1978 to market and distribute products made by indigenous peoples. Aarong services about 65,000 artisans, and sells gold and silver jewellery, handloom, leather crafts, etc.

The Challenging the Frontiers of Poverty Reduction: Targeting the Ultra Poor (CFPR-TUP) project was started in 2002. The ultra-poor are a group of people who eat below 80% of their energy requirements, despite spending at least 80% of their income on food. In Bangladesh, they constitute the poorest 17.5 per cent of the population. These people suffer from chronic hunger and malnutrition, have inadequate shelter, are more prone to disease, are deprived of education, and are more vulnerable to recurring natural disasters. The CFPR-TUP programme is aimed at households that are too poor to access the benefits from development interventions such as microfinance and assists them to access mainstream development services. The program costs around US$35 million a year.

Some sources have argued that microcredit programs in Bangladesh, including those implemented by BRAC, may have unintended negative consequences for Bangladeshi women's economic status. Critics suggest that the financial assistance provided by BRAC might feed into the perception among local elites that women no longer require extra support. This perception may divert charitable giving's toward direct funding of religious institutions instead of direct aid to the impoverished.

=== Education ===
BRAC is one of the largest NGOs involved in primary education in Bangladesh. Since 1974, BRAC's primary education efforts were observable with their circulation of Gonokendra, an educational children's magazine, that BRAC sent to each of Bangladesh's primary schools. Soon they were circulating 3,000 issues monthly. Sponsored by UNICEF, they were able to disseminate 50,000 copies to the country's primary schools. BRAC continued developing education materials over the next few decades until, eventually, beginning to design their own primary and secondary school curriculum. In 1985, BRAC built 22 new one room schoolhouses, which constituted their "Non-Formal Primary Education Program" (NFPE). This was an effort to reduce illiteracy and truancy in Bangladeshi children, as well as address the education disparity between boys and girls.

In 2018, BRAC educated over a million children have been educated worldwide. Its schools constitute three-quarters of all NGO non-formal primary schools in the country.

BRAC's education programme provides non-formal primary education to those left out of the formal education system, especially poor, rural, or disadvantaged children, and drop-outs. Its schools are typically one room with one teacher and no more than 33 students. Core subjects include mathematics, social studies and English. The schools also offer extracurricular activities. They incentivise schooling by providing food, allowing flexible learning hours, and conferring scholarships contingent on academic performance.

Bangladesh has reduced the gap between male and female attendance in schools. The improvement in female enrollment, which has largely been at the primary level, is in part attributable to BRAC. Roughly 60% of the students in their schools are girls.

BRAC also runs a university called BRAC University, located in Dhaka, Bangladesh. BRAC University offers a liberal arts university education. The primary language for education at BRAC University is English. BRAC University is officially accredited by the University Grants Commission (UGC) and operates with the approval of the Ministry of Education in Bangladesh

=== Public health ===
BRAC started providing public healthcare in 1972 with an initial focus on curative care through paramedics and a self-financing health insurance scheme. The programme went on to provide integrated healthcare services to around 30 million people.

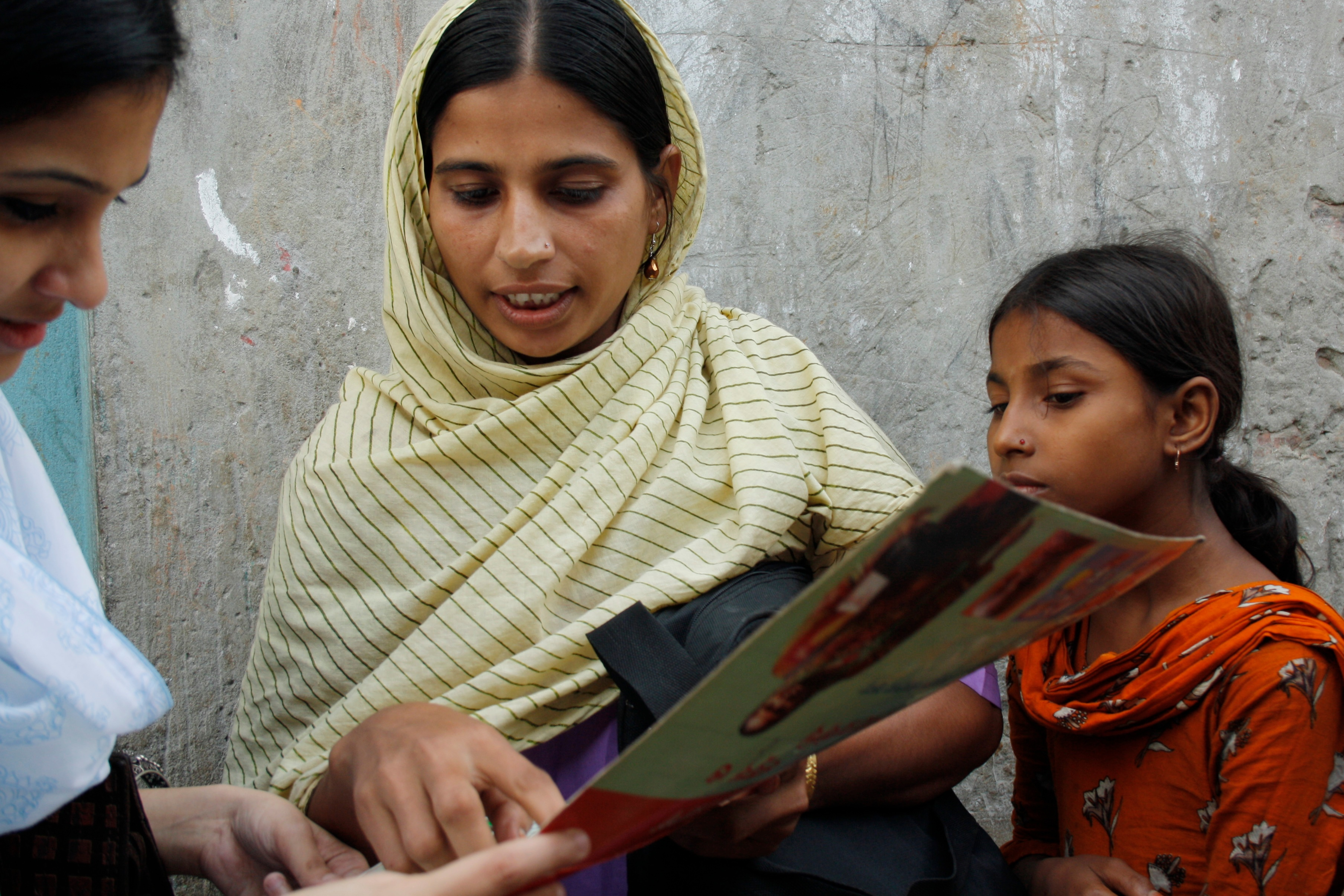
A BRAC community health worker conducting a survey in the Korail slum, Bangladesh

BRAC's 2007 impact assessment of its North West Microfinance Expansion Project testified to increased awareness of legal issues, including those of marriage and divorce, among women participants in BRAC programs. Furthermore, women participants' self-confidence was boosted, and the incidence of domestic violence was found to have declined. One of the most prominent forms of violence against women, acid throwing, has been decreasing by 15-20% annually since the enactment in 2002 of legislation specifically targeting acid violence.

=== Disaster relief ===
BRAC responded to Cyclone Sidr, which hit vast areas of the south-western coast of Bangladesh in mid-November 2007. BRAC provided emergency relief to survivors, like clothing, food, safe drinking water, and medical care. BRAC is now focusing on long-term rehabilitation, which will include agriculture support, infrastructure reconstruction and livelihood regeneration.

== Partnership with the Nike Foundation ==
BRAC has a collaboration with Nike's Girl Effect campaign to launch a new program to reach out to teenagers in Uganda and Tanzania.

== Finances ==
=== Donors ===
In 2006, BRAC received donations from the Directorate-General for International Cooperation (DGIS) and the government of the Netherlands / Embassy of the Kingdom of the Netherlands (EKN).

The Bill and Melinda Gates Foundation (BMGF) is on the list of BRAC donors, and in 2020 it committed multiple emergency response grants to BRAC and BRAC USA, totaling around the equivalent of US$600,000

In 2012, the Department for International Development (DFID), the government of the UK and Department of Foreign Affairs and Trade (DFAT), and the Australian government (SPA) (under the strategic partnership arrangement) became BRAC donors as well.

=== Revenue ===
BRAC is partly self-funded through a number of social enterprises. These include a retail fashion chain called Aarong that sells rural handicrafts, an agricultural seed business, a dairy, and a cold storage facility, among others. Between 2011 and 2015, surplus self-generated revenue from the organization's enterprises averaged $17 million annually.

Historian Taj Hashmi has criticized BRAC's projects for exploiting the cheap labour of rural women and children. An embroidered saree retailed at Aarong for 6,000 Bangladeshi taka ($120 as of 2000), for example, earned the embroiderer only 300 taka (less than $7).

== Geographic scope ==
BRAC operates in 13 countries.

- Asia: Bangladesh, Afghanistan, Sri Lanka, Pakistan, Philippines, Nepal, Myanmar
- Africa: Uganda, Rwanda, Tanzania, South Sudan, Liberia, Sierra Leone
- Caribbean: Haiti
- BRAC provides technical assistance to organisations in Haiti, Sudan, and Indonesia
- BRAC has affiliate organisations in the United Kingdom and the United States

== Honours and awards ==
- Independence Award, 2007
- Number one NGO in the world, 2019 by NGO Advisor.
- Number one NGO in the world, 2018
- Number one NGO in the world, 2017 by NGO Advisor
- Number one NGO in the world, 2016 by NGO Advisor

== See also ==
- ASA (NGO)
- Grameen Bank
