= Underprivileged Children's Educational Programme =

Nonprofit organization in Bangladesh

- Formation: 1990
- Headquarters: Dhaka, Bangladesh
- Region served: Bangladesh
- Official language: Bengali
- Website: www.ucepbd.org

Underprivileged Children's Educational Programme (Bengali: আন্ডারপ্রিভিলেজড চিলড্রেনস এডুকেশনাল প্রোগ্রাম) is a Bangladeshi non-profit organization based in Dhaka that works with children. It provides vocational training in Bangladesh. Parveen Mahmud, chairman of MIDAS Financing Limited, is the chairman of Underprivileged Children's Educational Programme.

== History ==
Underprivileged Children's Educational Programme traces its origin to a relief effort of Lindsay Allen Cheiney, a New Zealander, who came after the 1970 Bhola cyclone. It had 60 students in the beginning. With funding from the Government of Denmark Cheiney was able develop a three-year program for the education of children from low-income groups in South Western Bangladesh. The program established a technical school in Dhaka in 1983 later expanded in Chittagong and Khulna. The Underprivileged Children's Educational Programme registered nationally in 1990. It owns a technical school in Mirpur.

By 2010, 37 thousand children are enrolled in schools of the Underprivileged Children's Educational Programme. From 1979 to 2010, 171,016 children benefitted from the Underprivileged Children's Educational Programme. By 2012, enrollment had increased to 45 thousand children. It receives funding from Save the Children (Denmark-Sweden), Danish International Development Agency, Department for International Development, and Swiss Agency for Development and Cooperation. In 2016, 99 percent of the students of Underprivileged Children's Educational Programme received GPA-5 in SSC national exams, the highest possible grade.

In 2022, it launched a joint program with Standard Chartered Bangladesh for skilling training for those affected by the COVID-19 pandemic in Bangladesh. It also has a partnership with Social Islami Bank to provide training to underprivileged children.
