= List of companies of Bangladesh =

Companies of Bangladesh

Small, medium and large family owned conglomerates dominate over Bangladesh's economy. Most of these businesses in Bangladesh are grouped as conglomerates unlike other countries.

== Notable firms ==
This list includes notable companies with primary headquarters located in the country. The industry and sector follow the Industry Classification Benchmark taxonomy. Organizations, which have ceased operations are included and noted as defunct.

Notable companies Status: P=Private, S=State; A=Active, D=Defunct
Name	Industry	Sector	Headquarters	Founded	Notes	Status	
A K Khan & Company	Conglomerates	-	Chittagong	1945	Textiles, logistics, water, financial services, telecoms, agriculture	P	A
Aarong	Consumer goods	Personal & household goods	Dhaka	1978	General retail	P	A
Abul Khair Group	Conglomerates	-	Chattogram	1953	Steel, cement, tobacco, food & beverage, consumer product, automobile	P	A
Adamjee Jute Mills	Consumer goods	Clothing & accessories	Narayanganj	1951	Jute mill, defunct 2002	P	D
Advanced Chemical Industries (ACI)	Conglomerates	-	Dhaka	1968	Chemicals, foods, pharma, consumer products, logistics, consumer electronics, automobile services, communication	P	A
Agamee Prakashani	Consumer services	Publishing	Dhaka	1986	Publishing	P	A
Agrani Bank	Financials	Banks	Dhaka	1972	State-owned bank	S	A
Airtel Bangladesh	Telecommunications	Mobile telecommunications	Dhaka	2007	4G cellular, part of Axiata (Malaysia)	P	A
Akij	Conglomerates	-	Dhaka	1940	Textiles, tobacco, food & beverage, cement, ceramics, printing, pharma, consumer products, automobile, hospital	P	A
Alim Industries Limited	Industrials	-	Sylhet	1990	Agricultural machinery	P	A
Amar Desh	Consumer services	Publishing	Dhaka	2004	Newspaper	P	A
Anwar Group of Industries	Conglomerates	-	Dhaka	1834	Consumer goods, steel, cement, textile, finance, automotive	P	A
Adamjee Jute Mills	Consumer goods	Clothing & accessories	Narayanganj	1951	Jute mill, defunct 2002	P	D
Asian TV	Consumer services	Broadcasting & entertainment	Dhaka	2013	Satellite TV channel	P	A
ATN Bangla	Consumer services	Broadcasting & entertainment	Dhaka	1997	Satellite TV channel	P	A
ATN News	Consumer services	Broadcasting & entertainment	Dhaka	2010	24-hour news channel	P	A
Bangladesh Bank	Financials	Banks	Dhaka	1971	State bank	S	A
Bangladesh Betar	Consumer services	Broadcasting & entertainment	Dhaka	1939	state-owned radio broadcaster	S	A
Bangladesh Machine Tools Factory	Industrials	Defense	Gazipur City	1979	Defense vehicles	S	A
Bangladesh Petroleum Corporation	Oil & gas	Exploration & production	Dhaka	1976	State-owned petrochemical	S	A
Bangladesh Pratidin	Consumer services	Publishing	Dhaka	2010	Newspaper	P	A
Bangladesh Railway	Industrials	Railroads	Dhaka	1862	Railroads	S	A
Bangladesh Shipping Corporation	Industrials	Marine transportation	Chittagong	1972	State-owned shipping	S	A
Bangladesh Telecommunications Company Limited	Telecommunications	Mobile telecommunications	Dhaka	1971	State-owned mobile telecommunications	S	A
Bangladesh Television	Consumer services	Broadcasting & entertainment	Dhaka	1964	State-owned TV broadcaster	S	A
Banglalink	Telecommunications	Mobile telecommunications	Dhaka	1996	4G cellular	P	A
Banglalion	Telecommunications	Mobile telecommunications	Dhaka	2008	4G LTE wireless broadband	P	D
Banglavision	Consumer services	Broadcasting & entertainment	Dhaka	2006	Satellite TV channel	P	A
Bashundhara Group	Conglomerates	Real estate, media, manufacturing, retail, and construction	Dhaka	1987	Property development, cement, paper, steel, food, media	P	A
Bengal Group	Conglomerates	-	Dhaka	1969	Consumer goods, construction and development, feed, plastics, cement, food, media	P	A
Best Air	Consumer services	Airlines	Dhaka	2007	Private airline, defunct 2009	P	D
Beximco Pharma	Health care	Pharmaceuticals	Gazipur City	1980	Pharmaceuticals, part of Beximco	P	A
Beximco	Conglomerates	-	Dhaka	1972	Pharmaceuticals, textiles, ceramics, aviation, media, finance, real estate, construction	P	A
Bhorer Kagoj	Consumer services	Publishing	Dhaka	1992	Newspaper	P	A
Bikroy.com	Technology	Software	Dhaka	2012	E-commerce	P	A
Biman Bangladesh Airlines	Consumer services	Airlines	Dhaka	1972	Flag carrier airline	P	A
Bismillah Airlines	Consumer services	Airlines	Dhaka	1998	Airline	P	A
Bismillah Group	Consumer goods	Clothing & accessories	Dhaka	1988	Textiles and towels	P	A
BRAC Bank Limited	Financials	Banks	Dhaka	2001	Private commercial bank	P	A
BSRM	Basic materials	Iron & steel	Chittagong	1952	Steel products	P	A
BTCL	Telecommunications	Fixed line telecommunications	Dhaka	1971	Fixed line, broadband Internet	P	A
Building Technology & Ideas	Financials	Real estate holding & development	Dhaka	1984	Financial services, real estate	P	A
Channel 9	Consumer services	Broadcasting & entertainment	Dhaka	2011	Satellite TV channel	P	A
Channel 24	Consumer services	Broadcasting & entertainment	Dhaka	2012	24-hour news channel	P	A
Channel i	Consumer services	Broadcasting & entertainment	Dhaka	1999	Private television network	P	A
City Group	Conglomerates	-	Dhaka	1972	Consumer goods, foods, steel, printing & packaging, shipping, power & energy, financials	P	A
Citycell	Telecommunications	Mobile telecommunications	Dhaka	1989	CDMA mobile communications	P	D
Concord Group	Conglomerates	Construction and real estate	Dhaka	1973	Construction, real estate, architecture & design, communication, entertainment, hospitality, garments	P	A
Confidence Group	Conglomerates	Engineering and power generation	Dhaka	1991	Engineering, concrete, energy, paints	P	A
Cooper's	Consumer goods	Food & beverage	Dhaka	1984	Bakery	P	A
Credit Rating Information and Services Limited (CRISL)	Financials	Consumer finance	Dhaka	1992	Credit ratings	P	A
Daily Inqilab	Consumer services	Publishing	Dhaka	1986	Newspaper	P	A
DBC News	Consumer services	Broadcasting & entertainment	Dhaka	2016	24-hour news channel	P	A
DBL Group	Conglomerates		Dhaka	1991	Textiles, pharmaceuticals, ICT, semiconductors	P	A
Deepto TV	Consumer services	Broadcasting & entertainment	Dhaka	2015	Satellite TV channel	P	A
Delta Brac Housing Finance Corporation	Financials	Consumer finance	Dhaka	1996	Financial services	P	A
Desh TV	Consumer services	Broadcasting & entertainment	Dhaka	2009	Television network	P	A
Dhaka Bank Limited	Financials	Banks	Dhaka	1995	Private commercial bank	P	A
Dragon Group	Consumer goods	Clothing & accessories	Dhaka	1980	Clothing	P	A
Dutch Bangla Bank	Financials	Banks	Dhaka	1995	Private commercial bank	P	A
Eastern Bank Limited	Financials	Banks	Dhaka	1992	Private commercial bank	P	A
Eastern Housing Limited	Financials	Real estate holding & development	Dhaka	1965	Real estate	P	A
Ekattor TV	Consumer services	Broadcasting & entertainment	Dhaka	2012	24-hour news channel	P	A
Ekushey Television	Consumer services	Broadcasting & entertainment	Dhaka	2000	Satellite TV channel	P	A
Eskayef Bangladesh	Health care	Pharmaceuticals	Dhaka	1990	Pharmaceuticals	P	A
EXIM Bank	Financials	Banks	Dhaka	1999	Private commercial bank	P	A
FMC Dockyard Limited	Industrials	Commercial vehicles & trucks	Chittagong	1998	Shipyard	P	A
Gazi Group	Conglometates	-	Dhaka	1974	Tyres, plastic products, water tanks	P	A
General Pharma	Health care	Pharmaceuticals	Dhaka	1984	Pharmaceuticals	P	A
Globe Janakantha Shilpa Paribar	Conglomerates	-	Dhaka	1969	Construction, engineering, electrical cables, information technology, printing, media	P	A
GMG Airlines	Consumer services	Airlines	Dhaka	1997	Airline, defunct 2012	P	D
Grameen Bank	Financials	Banks	Dhaka	1983	Microfinance	P	A
Grameenphone	Telecommunications	Mobile telecommunications	Dhaka	1997	4G cellular	P	A
GTV	Consumer services	Broadcasting & entertainment	Dhaka	2011	Private television network	P	A
Habib Group	Conglomerates	-	Chittagong	1947	Aviation, cement, paper, energy, steel, textile	P	A
Ha-meem Group	Consumer goods	Clothing & accessories	Dhaka	1984	Textiles, leather, jute mill	P	A
Hatil	Consumer goods	Furnishings	Dhaka	1989	Furniture	P	A
HRC Group	Conglomerates	-	Dhaka	1991	Shipping, media, real estate, agri-products, IT	P	A
IDLC Asset Management Limited	Financials	Nonequity investment instruments	Dhaka	2016	Mutual funds	P	A
IDLC Finance Limited	Financials	Specialty finance	Dhaka	1985	Loans, deposits, commercial financials	P	A
IDLC Investments Limited	Financials	Specialty finance	Dhaka	2010	Merchant bank	P	A
IDLC Securities Limited	Financials	Specialty finance	Dhaka	2006	Stockbroker	P	A
IFIC Bank	Financials	Banks	Dhaka	1976	Private commercial bank	P	A
Impress Group	Conglomerate	Pharmaceuticals	Dhaka	1999	Pharmaceuticals	P	A
Independent Television	Consumer services	Broadcasting & entertainment	Dhaka	2010	24-hour news channel	P	A
Investment Corporation of Bangladesh (ICB)	Financials	Investment services	Dhaka	1976		P	A
Islami Bank Bangladesh Ltd	Financials	Banks	Dhaka	1983	Private bank	P	A
Jaaz Multimedia	Consumer services	Broadcasting & entertainment	Dhaka	2011		P	A
Jaijaidin	Consumer services	Publishing	Dhaka	2006	Newspaper	P	A
Jamuna Bank	Financials	Banks	Dhaka	2001	Private commercial bank	P	A
Jamuna Group	Conglomerates	-	Dhaka	1974	Textiles, chemicals, construction, leather, engineering, beverages, media, advertisement	P	A
Jamuna Oil Company	Oil & gas	Exploration & production	Chittagong	1964	Secondary oil products, part of Bangladesh Petroleum Corporation	S	A
Jamuna Television	Consumer services	Broadcasting & entertainment	Dhaka	2014	24-hour news channel	P	A
Janakantha	Consumer services	Publishing	Dhaka	1993	Newspaper	P	A
Janata Bank	Financials	Banks	Dhaka	1971	State-owned bank	S	A
Jiban Bima Corporation	Financials	Life insurance	Dhaka	1973	State-owned life insurance company	S	A
Jugantor	Consumer services	Publishing	Dhaka	2000	Newspaper	P	A
Kaler Kantho	Consumer services	Publishing	Dhaka	2010	Newspaper	P	A
Kallol Group of Companies	Conglomerates	-	Dhaka	1972	Foods and beverage, hygiene, fabric care, watch and instruments	P	A
Karnaphuli Group	Conglomerates		Chittagong	1954	Automobiles, retails, media, ports, shipping, real estate	P	A
Kazi Farms Group	Consumer goods	Food products	Dhaka	1996	Poultry	P	A
KDS Group	Consumer goods	Clothing & accessories	Chittagong	1983	Textiles	P	A
Khulna Shipyard	Industrials	Commercial vehicles & trucks	Khulna	1957	State-owned shipyard	S	A
M. M. Ispahani Limited	Conglomerates	-	Chittagong	1820	Tea, textiles, jute, shipping, real estate, food	P	A
Maasranga Television	Consumer services	Broadcasting & entertainment	Dhaka	2011	Private television Network	P	A
Manab Zamin	Consumer services	Publishing	Dhaka	1998	Newspaper	P	A
Mask Associates	Private limited	Jute	Chittagong	1982	Jute manufacturing and export	P	A
Meghna Group of Industries	Conglomerates	-	Dhaka	1976	Chemicals, foods and beverages, printing and packaging, shipping, insurance	P	A
Meghna Group	Conglomerates	-	Dhaka	1989	Automobile, engineering (bicycle), cement, packaging, textile	P	A
Mohona TV	Consumer services	Broadcasting & entertainment	Dhaka	2010	Private television network	P	A
Monsoon Films	Consumer services	Broadcasting & entertainment	Dhaka	2010		P	A
Nasir Group	Conglomerates	-	Dhaka	1977	Glass, melamine, printing and packaging, light bulbs	P	A
Nassa Group	Conglomerates	-	Dhaka	1990	Textiles, banking, real estate, financial services, travel, education	P	A
National Bank Limited	Financials	Banks	Dhaka	1983	Public limited bank	P	A
Navana Group	Conglomerates	-	Dhaka	1964	Marketing, construction, real estate	P	A
New Age	Consumer services	Publishing	Dhaka	2003	Newspaper	P	A
News24	Consumer services	Broadcasting & entertainment	Dhaka	2016	24-hour news channel	P	A
Novoair	Consumer services	Airlines	Dhaka	2007	Private airline	P	A
NTV	Consumer services	Broadcasting & entertainment	Dhaka	2003	Satellite TV channel	P	A
One Bank Limited	Financials	Banks	Dhaka	1999	Commercial bank	P	A
Orion Group	Conglomerates	-	Dhaka	1985	Pharmaceuticals, real estate, construction, power, hospitality, textiles, aviation	P	A
Otobi	Consumer goods	Furnishings	Dhaka	1975	Furniture	P	A
Padma Oil Company	Oil & gas	Exploration & production	Dhaka	1965		P	A
Paradise Group of Industries	Conglomerates	-	Narayanganj	1985	Electrical cable, textiles, engineering, real estate	P	A
Partex Group	Conglomerates	-	Dhaka	1959	Food & beverages, steel, real estate, furniture, plastics, paper, power & energy, jute, agribusiness, shipyards, shipping, textiles, construction, IT, cabling, aviation, garments, PVC, ceramics, telecommunication, Oil	P	A
Petrobangla	Oil & gas	Exploration & production	Dhaka	1972	National oil company	P	A
Power Grid Company of Bangladesh	Utilities	Conventional electricity	Dhaka	1996		P	A
Pragoti	Consumer goods	Automobiles	Chittagong	1966	Automobiles	S	A
PRAN-RFL Group	Consumer goods	Pran Food and Beverage & RFL Plastic and Home Appliance	Dhaka	1981	Food and beverage, plastic products, home appliance	P	A
Pride Group	Consumer goods	Clothing & accessories	Dhaka	1958		P	A
Prime Bank Limited	Financials	Banks	Dhaka	1995	Private commercial bank	P	A
Prothom Alo	Consumer services	Publishing	Dhaka	1998	Newspaper	P	A
Pubali Bank	Financials	Banks	Dhaka	1959	Private commercial bank	P	A
Radiant Shipyard	Industrials	Commercial vehicles & trucks	Narayanganj	2012	Shipyard	P	A
Radio Foorti	Consumer services	Broadcasting & entertainment	Dhaka	2006	Radio	P	A
Radio Today	Consumer services	Broadcasting & entertainment	Dhaka	2006	Radio	P	A
Rahimafrooz	Conglomerates	-	Chittagong	1954	Retail, electronics, automotive, oil & gas	P	A
Rajshahi Krishi Unnayan Bank	Financials	Banks	Rajshahi	1986	State-owned bank	S	A
Rangs Group	Conglomerates	-	Dhaka	1979	Automobile, electronics, real estate, shipping	P	A
RanksTel	Telecommunications	Fixed line telecommunications	Dhaka	2004	Fixed line	P	A
Regent Airways	Consumer services	Airlines	Dhaka	2010	Private airline, part of Habib Group	P	A
Regent Power Limited	Utilities	Conventional electricity	Chittagong	2007	Part of Habib Group	P	A
Renata Limited	Health care	Pharmaceuticals	Dhaka	1993	Pharmaceuticals	P	A
Robi	Telecommunications	Mobile telecommunications	Dhaka	1997	4G cellular	P	A
RTV	Consumer services	Broadcasting & entertainment	Dhaka	2005	Satellite TV channel	P	A
Runner automobiles Ltd.	Consumer goods	Automobiles	Dhaka	2000	Automobiles	P	A
Rupali Bank	Financials	Banks	Dhaka	1972	State-owned bank	S	A
Sadharan Bima Corporation	Financials	Full line insurance	Dhaka	1973	State-owned non-life insurance company	S	A
Sajeeb Group	Conglomerates	-	Dhaka	1982	Food & beverage, basic materials, construction, oil & gas, industrial transportation, real estate	P	A
SA TV	Consumer services	Broadcasting & entertainment	Dhaka	2013	Satellite TV channel	P	A
Samakal	Consumer services	Publishing	Dhaka	2005	Newspaper	P	A
S. Alam Group of Industries	Conglomerates	-	Chittagong	1985	Food & beverage, basic materials, construction, oil & gas, industrial transportation, real estate	P	A
Sheltech	Financials	Real estate holding & development	Dhaka	1988	Real estate	P	A
Shyampur Sugar Mills	Consumer goods	Food products	Rangpur City	1967	Sugar; falls under the Bangladesh Sugar and Food Industries Corporation	S	A
Sikder Group	Conglomerate		Dhaka	1950	Textiles, power, real estate, healthcare, banking, insurance, aviation	P	A
Somoy TV	Consumer services	Broadcasting & entertainment	Dhaka	2010	24-hour news channel	P	A
Sonali Bank	Financials	Banks	Dhaka	1972	State-owned bank	S	A
Southeast Bank Limited	Financials	Banks	Dhaka	1995	Private commercial bank	P	A
Square Group	Health care	Pharmaceuticals	Dhaka	1958	Pharmaceuticals	P	A
STS Group	Health care	Conglomerates	Dhaka	1997	Education and healthcare	P	A
Summit Group	Conglomerates	-	Dhaka	1985	Telecommunications, oil & gas, industrial transportation	P	A
T K Group of Industries	Conglomerates	-	Chittagong	1972	Consumer goods, edible oil, paper, steel, tea, basic materials, industrial transportation, financials	P	A
The ACME Laboratories Ltd	Health care	Pharmaceuticals	Dhaka	1954	Pharmaceuticals	P	A
The Daily Ittefaq	Consumer services	Publishing	Dhaka	1953	Newspaper	P	A
The Daily Star	Consumer services	Publishing	Dhaka	1991	Newspaper	P	A
The Sangbad	Consumer services	Publishing	Dhaka	1951	Newspaper	P	A
Titas Gas	Oil & gas	Exploration & production	Dhaka	1964	Natural gas distributor	S	A
Transcom Group	Conglomerates	-	Dhaka	1985	Beverage, pharma, newspaper, radio, electronics, foods	P	A
Trust Bank Limited	Financials	Banks	Dhaka	1999	Commercial bank	P	A
United Airways	Consumer services	Airlines	Dhaka	2005	Private airline, defunct 2016	P	D
United Finance	Financials	Financial services	Dhaka	1989	Financial services	P	A
US-Bangla Airlines	Consumer services	Airlines	Dhaka	2013	Private airline	P	A
Uttara Bank Limited	Financials	Banks	Dhaka	1965	Private commercial bank	P	A
Walton	Conglomerates	-	Dhaka	1977	Automobiles, consumer electronics, household goods, technology hardware, electronic equipment	P	A
Western Marine Shipyard	Industrials	Commercial vehicles & trucks	Chittagong	2000	Shipyard	P	A

== See also ==
- Economy of Bangladesh
- Chittagong Stock Exchange
- Dhaka Stock Exchange
- List of Bangladeshi record labels
- List of banks in Bangladesh
- List of manufacturing companies of Bangladesh
- Pharmaceutical industry in Bangladesh
