= List of manufacturing companies of Bangladesh =

This is a list of notable manufacturing companies of Bangladesh.

== A ==
- Akij Group
- Alim Industries Limited

== B ==
- Bangladesh Machine Tools Factory
- Bashundhara Group
- Bengal Group of Industries
- BEXIMCO
- British American Tobacco Bangladesh
- BSRM

== C ==
- Chittagong Dry Dock Limited
- Confidence Group

== G ==
- Globe Janakantha Shilpa Paribar

== H ==
- Habib Group

== K ==
- KDS Group

== M ==
- Meghna Group

== P ==
- Pragoti

== R ==
- Radiant Shipyard

== S ==
- Sikder Group

== T ==
- T K Group of Industries

== U ==
- Unilever Bangladesh Limited
