= Economy of Chittagong =

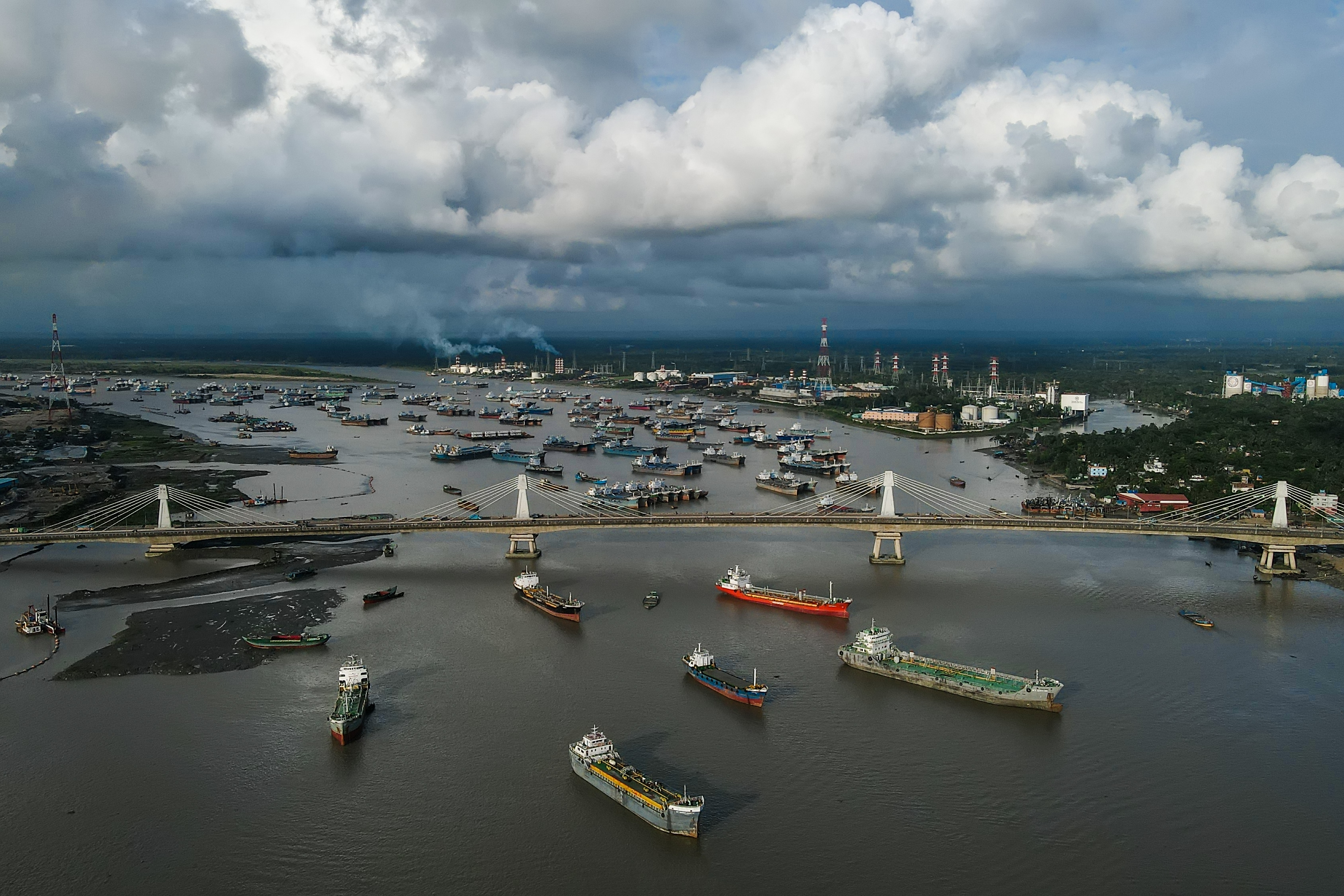
- Currency: Bangladeshi taka (BDT, ৳)
- Fiscal year: FY22-23
- Trade organisations: SAFTA, SAARC, BIMSTEC, WTO, AIIB, IMF, Commonwealth of Nations, World Bank, ADB, Developing-8
- Country group: Developing/Emerging

Statistics
- GDP rank: 2nd in Bangladesh
- Population below national poverty line: 17.4% (2022)
- Human Development Index: 0.695 medium · 3rd of 20
- Main industries: Textiles; Shipbuilding; Automotive; Leather; Jute; Glass; Paper; Plastic; Food and Beverages; Cement; Fishing; Tea; Rice; Natural Gas and Crude Petroleum; Steel; Ship breaking

The economy of Chittagong ranks second in size behind Dhaka in Bangladesh. Chittagong metropolitan City is the second largest metropolitan city in Bangladesh. Chittagong is the export hub of Bangladesh. Chittagong is the commercial hub of country. Chittagong is also home to the busiest port in the country.

== History ==
The excavation of Neolithic fossils and tools in Sitakunda, Chittagong District, indicates the presence of Stone Age settlements in the region as early as the third millennium BCE. The earliest historical records of the Port of Chittagong date back to the 4th century BC, when sailors from the area embarked on voyages to Southeast Asia. The 2nd century Graeco-Roman geographer Ptolemy mentioned the port on his map as one of the finest harbours in Asia and the eastern frontier of the Indian subcontinent. The 7th century travelling Chinese scholar and poet Xuanzang described it as "a sleeping beauty emerging from mists and water".

== GDP ==
A substantial share of Bangladesh's national GDP is attributed to Chittagong. Chittagong holds the status of being the second largest economy in Bangladesh, only behind Dhaka Division. The economy of Chittagong is largely based on textile and garment industry. Chittagong Division consists of eleven districts, including Chittagong District and Cumilla District. A substantial chunk of Chittagong Division's GDP is attributed to Chittagong city (contributing around 12% of Bangladesh's GDP).

=== Shipbuilding industry ===
Since 2008, the shipbuilding industry has expanded in Chittagong. Companies such as Western Marine Shipyard have exported ships to Denmark, the Netherlands, New Zealand, Germany, Kenya and India. As of 2012, The shipbuilding industries in Chittagong generates approximately US$400 million annually, as the sector targets US$4 billion in export from shipbuilding industry by 2020.

=== Chittagong Stock Exchange ===
CSE is one of two stock exchanges in Bangladesh, with market capitalisation of US$30 billion. The stock exchange was established in 1995. The market currently holds 250 listings, and one of the top performing stock exchange in Asia.

=== Multinational companies ===
Chittagong is home of regional headquarters of many re known international companies including Glaxo Smith Kline, Reckitt Benckiser, Unilever, James Finlay PLC, BOC Bangladesh Ltd., GEC Bangladesh Ltd., Coats Thread, Berger, KAFCO, and Duncan.

== Companies based in Chittagong ==
- A K Khan & Company:One of the oldest private sector organisations in Bangladesh.
- BSRM: Bangladeshi steel manufacturing conglomerate based in Chittagong. It was founded in 1952. The company generates $800 million revenue.
- Habib Group: Habib Group was founded in 1947. Currently company's annual turnover is close to $500 million, and employs more than 20,000 employees and many manufacturing locations throughout Bangladesh.
- Jamuna Oil Company: Jamuna Oil Company Limited (estd. as Pakistan National Oil in 1964; renamed as Bangladesh National Oil in 1972) is a subsidiary of the Bangladesh Petroleum Corporation that nationally markets Octane, Petrol, Diesel, Kerosene, Furnace Oil, Bitumen and Lubricants in Bangladesh.
- KDS Group: Founded in 1983, through the establishment of one of the first garments industries in Bangladesh, today the total group generates $500 million of annual revenues in total with over 25,000 employees, staff and workers.
- M. M. Ispahani Limited
- Padma Oil Company: The Padma Oil Company Limited, formerly Burmah Eastern Limited, is a Bangladesh state owned petroleum company with its head office in Strand Road, Chittagong. It is a descendant of the historic Burmah Oil Company in the British Empire and began operations in Bengal in 1903. In 1965, Burmah Eastern was established in Chittagong jointly by Burmah Oil and East Pakistani investors.
- S. Alam Group of Industries: Bangladeshi industrial conglomerate. The industries under this group include food & allied products, steel, banking, consumer products, sugar, cement, power, energy, transportation, shipping, manufacturing, hospitality, financial institution, agro, trading, oil, gas. Annual turnover was recorded $2.0 billion in 2014.
- Seamark Group: Multinational food processing conglomerate wholesale company with offices in Manchester, Chittagong, New Jersey and Brooklyn. The company was founded in 1976 and established in 1991. Annual turnover is $300 million.
- T K Group of Industries: One of the largest conglomerates known for its vegetable oil business in Bangladesh with a turnover over US$1.5 billion. This group is one of the top three VAT payers in the country. It also has interests in steel, shipbuilding, pulp and paper, plastics, cement, and textiles.
- PHP Family
- Abul Khair Group
- Mostafa–Hakim Group
