= Brothers Furniture =

Bangladeshi furniture manufacturer and retailer

Brothers Furniture Limited
- Type: Private
- Industry: Furniture
- Founded: 1981
- Headquarters: Progoti Sharani, Baridhara, Dhaka
- Key people: Md. Habibur Rahman Sarker (Chairman), Md. Eleais Sarker (Managing Director), Md. Sharifuzzaman Sharker (Director)
- Website: https://www.brothersfurniture.com.bd/

Brothers furniture is a Bangladeshi furniture manufacturer and retailer. Habibur Rahman Sarkar is the chairman of Brothers Furniture. It has 45 outlets around Bangladesh.

== History ==
Brothers Furniture was established in 1981 by Md. Habibur Rahman Sarkar and his brother Elias Sarkar. It the mid 1970s the store as called Bhai Bhai Furniture.

In 2012, Sharifuzzaman Sarkar, son of Md. Habibur Rahman Sarkar, was appointed chairman of Brothers Furniture.

Brothers furniture launched an e-commerce app for furniture in 2018.

Brothers Furniture produces furniture using a variety of materials, including wood, steel, Partex/B-Nile board, aluminum, plastic, marble, bamboo, and cane. From 2021, with Dhaka Ladies Club, the company started collaborating in ongoing charitable activities.

The company has a strategic partnership with Bkash. Along with other companies like Hatil, Akhtar, Navana, Pertex, Regal, Nadia, Brothers furniture exported furniture worth $190.36 million in the fiscal year (2021–2022).
