= Bank Asia PLC =

Bangladeshi private bank

- Company type: Public Limited Company
- Traded as: DSE: BANKASIA; CSE: BANKASIA
- Industry: Banking
- Founded: 27 November 1999
- Headquarters: Dhaka, Bangladesh
- Key people: (Chairman) Romo Rouf Chowdhury (Managing director) Sohail R K Hussain
- Products: Banking services Consumer Banking; Corporate Banking; Agent Banking; Islamic Banking; Credit Cards; Remmittance Operations; Student Files, etc
- Website: www.bankasia-bd.com

Bank Asia PLC is a private sector commercial bank in Bangladesh. Sohail R. K. Hossain is the current president and managing director of the bank. Romo Rouf Chowdhury, chairman of Rancon Group, is the chairman of Bank Asia Limited.

== History ==
The bank was established as a private commercial bank on 28 September 1999, and incorporated in 1999. it expanded through the purchase of the branches of Bank of Nova Scotia and Muslim Commercial Bank Limited. In 2001, it purchased the operations of Scotiabank which entered Bangladesh in 1999.

Bank Asia relocated its Nova Scotia branch from Bijoy Sarani to Kazi Nazrul Islam avenue. It signed an agreement with Dutch-Bangla Bank Limited to have access to their automated teller machine network.

In 2008, Bank Asia announced a 25 per cent stock dividends. The bank also introduced Islamic banking.

Bank Asia was awarded third prize in corporate governance disclosures and achieved certificate of merit under integrated reporting category in the 17th ICAB National Award for BPAR-2016.

Bank Asia was awarded the Intellectual Property Protection Award in 2020 by the Bangladesh Copyright Board. It arranged a seven billion taka loan for Bashundhara Group to build a cement plant. Romo Rouf Chowdhury, chairman of Rangs Group, was elected chairman of the bank in August 2022.

On 10 February 2024, Sohial R K Hussain was appointed managing director of Bank Asia Limited. The bank distributed loans to 220 women farmers in June. On 16 April 2024, Bank Asia Limited has changed its name to 'Bank Asia plc'.
