= Golam Mowla =

Bangladeshi insurance pioneer

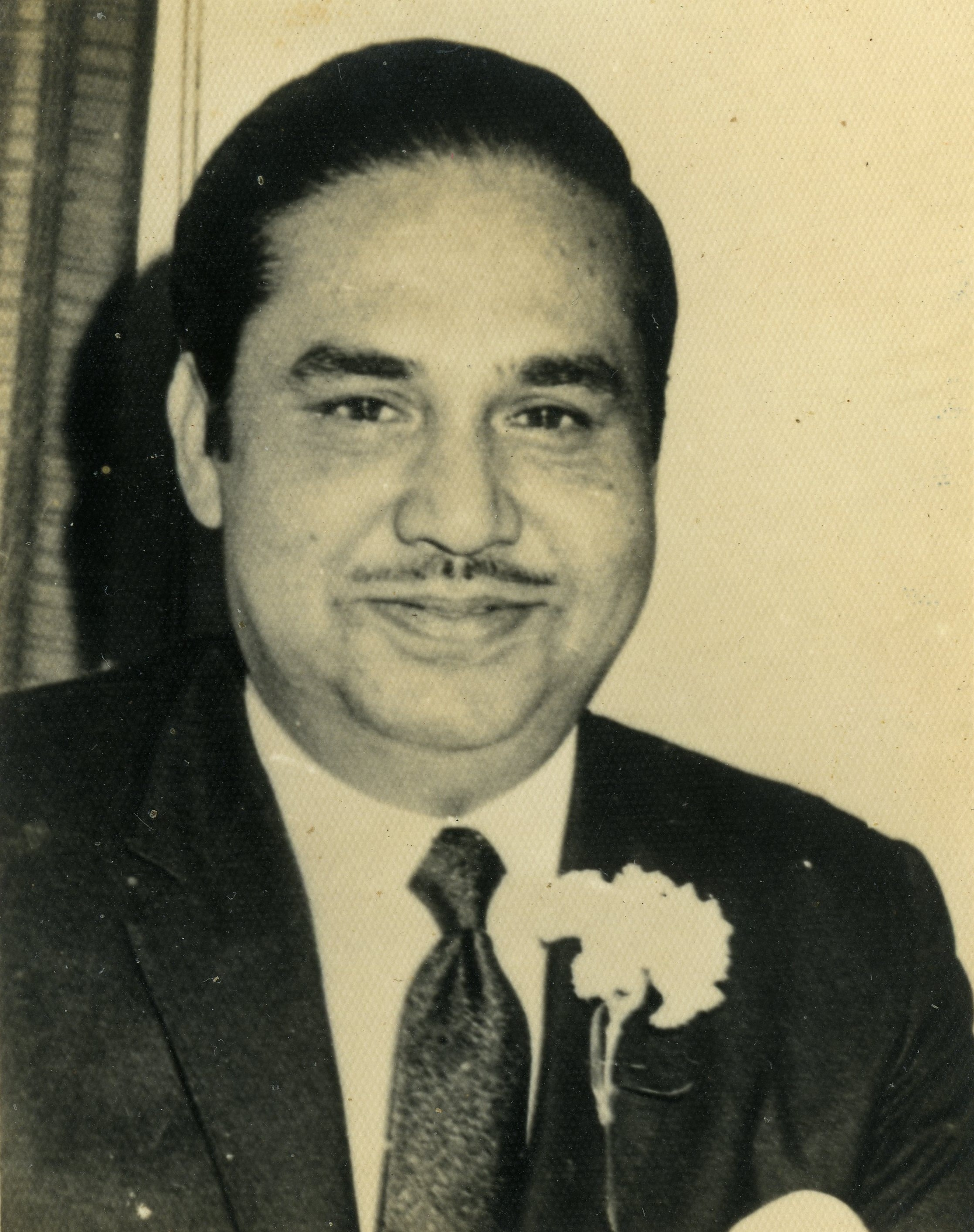
Golam Mowla

Golam Mowla (23 March 1920 - 4 July 1984) pioneered the insurance industry in Pakistan and Bangladesh and was a philanthropist. He was one of the first Bengali entrepreneurs to found an insurance company in East Pakistan (later Bangladesh). He went on to become the first Managing Director of Bangladesh's state-owned general insurance company Sadharan Bima Corporation.

== Early life and education ==
Mowla was born on 23 March 1920 to Sikander Ali Talukdar and Shamsunnahar Begam in Hemnagar, Gopalpur Upazila, Tangail District, East Bengal, British India. His father was a Civil Engineer during the time of the British Raj. He studied at Presidency College in Kolkata, where he earned a bachelor's degree in commerce.

== Career ==
Mowla began his career in insurance by joining Oriental Fire and General Insurance Co. in Kolkata in 1946. Later, after partition, he transferred to Dhaka. During the 1960s, he co-founded GMG Group as a manufacturing business and sold it to Aziz Sattar. Sattar later expanded the business to include GMG Airlines, the first private airline in Bangladesh. Mowla then founded Great Eastern Insurance Co. in 1965.

Outside of business, Mowla was the first member representing the general insurance industry at the Rotary Club of Dhaka and was elected President from 1961-62. Previously, his friend Khuda Buksh had been the sole insurance industry representative at the Rotary Club; with the permission of the Rotary Club headquarters in the United States, Buksh was designated as the representative of life insurance while Mowla was for general insurance. He also served for two terms as Vice Chairman of the Insurance Association of Pakistan from 1967-69, and represented the insurance industry in Pakistan as a Delegate to RCD (Regional Cooperation for Development in Iran, Turkey and Pakistan).

During the upheaval of the Bangladesh Liberation War, Golam Mowla left for London in 1971. He returned to an independent Bangladesh with the founding father of the nation, Sheikh Mujibur Rahman, in a Royal Air Force aircraft on 10 January 1972. Following Bangladesh's independence, the insurance industry was nationalized along with several others. Four corporations were set up - Karnafuli and Teesta for general insurance and Rupsa and Surma for life insurance. Golam Mowla was selected to serve as Chairman of Teesta. Within a year, further consolidation saw Rupsa and Surma merge into Bangladesh Jiban Bima Corporation, while Karnafuli and Teesta merged into Sadharan (General) Bima Corporation. He was appointed the first managing director of Sadharan Bima Corporation on 14 March 1973, and he retired in 1975. Meanwhile Khuda Buksh was appointed head of Jiban Bima Corporation.

== Death ==
Mowla died on 4 July 1984.
