= Reliance Insurance PLC =

Insurance company in Bangladesh

Reliance Insurance PLC.
- Company type: Public Limited
- Industry: Financial services, insurance
- Founded: March 22, 1988; 38 years ago
- Headquarters: Dhaka, Bangladesh
- Key people: Shahnaz Rahman (Chairman); Md. Khaled Mamun FCII (CEO)
- Number of employees: 278 (2024)
- Website: reliance.com.bd

Reliance Insurance PLC., was founded in Bangladesh as a private non-life insurance company in 1988. Currently the firm has 31 branches throughout Bangladesh, with 278 employees. In the year 2024, the company had earned BDT 5,122.02 million as the gross premium income, which is higher than that of 2023. Reliance has become the highest premium-earning insurance company in Bangladesh for the year 2024, with a total premium income of BDT 5,122.02 million. Ms. Shahnaz Rahman is the chairman of Reliance Insurance PLC.

== History ==
In Bangladesh the insurance sector was nationalized in 1972 just after independence. Following the nationalization, the then Government established two insurance corporations. One is Bangladesh Sadharan Bima Corporation for the non-life insurance business, and another is Bangladesh Jiban Bima Corporation for life insurance business. Subsequently, the government opened the door for establishing private insurance companies through the Insurance (Amendment) Ordinance 1984. Transcom Group, Rangs Group, and the Kumudini Welfare Trust were major promoters of the company and still retain their shares.

Under the provisions of 1984 ordinance, Reliance Insurance PLC started its operation by virtue of the Certificate of Commencement of Business" issued on 22 March 1988 by Registrar of Joint Stock Companies of Bangladesh. The company also enjoyed its 25th anniversary in 2014.

In 2024, the insurance company has given a 30 per cent cash dividend.

== Regulatory framework ==
Insurance Development & Regulatory Authority of Bangladesh (IDRA), an entity formed under the Insurance Development and Regulatory Authority Act 2010, regulates all insurance companies of Bangladesh in accordance with the Insurance Act 2010.

== Financial performance ==
The company earned gross premium of BDT 5,122.02 million in 2024 and gross premium in 2023 was BDT 3,902.39. The company has made an underwriting profit of BDT 797.79 million and investment income of BDT 615.89 million in the year 2024. In its 37rd Annual General Meeting (virtual), a cash dividend of 30% was distributed to its shareholders for the year 2024. Furthermore; CRISL awarded RIL "AAA" (pronounced as Triple A) surveillance rating for 2024.

== Major shareholders ==
Transcom Group through:

- Shamsur Rahman (3.91%)
- Trinco Ltd. (7.19%)
- Transfin Trading Ltd. (7.19%)
- Transcom Electronics Ltd. (4.23%)

Rangs Group through:

- Rangs Ltd. (6.72%)
- Deep Sea Fishers Ltd. (6.24%)
- Rangs Workshop Ltd. (3.55%)

Kumudini Welfare Trust of Bengal through:

- Kumudini Welfare Trust (6.53%)

== Insurance services ==
- Marine insurance
- Property insurance & Engineering insurance
- Liability insurance & Health insurance
- Motor Insurance
