= GPH Ispat =

Steel company in Chittagong, Bangladesh

GPH Ispat Limited
- Brand logo
- Native name: জিপিএইচ ইস্পাত লিমিটেড
- Type: Public Limited
- Traded as: DSE: GPHISPAT; CSE: GPHISPAT
- Industry: Heavy
- Genre: Reinforcement steel
- Founded: 17 May 2006; 20 years ago
- Founder: Mohammed Jahangir Alam
- Headquarters: Crown Chamber, Asadganj-325, Chittagong, Bangladesh
- Key people: Mohammed Alamgir Kabir (Chairman); Mohammed Jahangir Alam (Managing Director)
- Revenue: ▼৳5,582.9 Crore (2023-24)
- Net income: ▲ ৳85.77 Crore (2023-24)
- Total assets: ▲৳9,027.6 Crore (2023-24)
- Number of employees: 2,233 (as of 30 June 2024)
- Parent: GPH Group
- Website: www.gphispat.com.bd

GPH Ispat Limited (Bengali: জিপিএইচ ইস্পাত লিমিটেড) is a public limited steel manufacturing company based in Chittagong, Bangladesh.

== Name ==
GPH is the acronym of "God fearing", "Plain living" and "High Thinking". Ispat is the transliteration of the Bengali word ইস্পাত which means steel.

== History ==
The company was founded on 17 May 2006 and started its operation in 2008. It was listed as a public limited company in 2012.

In 2016, the company launched an expansion project in Sitakunda, Chittagong in partnership with Primetals Technologies—a joint venture between Siemens VAI and Mitsubishi Heavy Industries & Partners—as the equipment supplier. The company invested around US$200 million for the 0.8 MTPY steel manufacturing facility. The new mill uses an electric arc furnace (trade mark Quantum), a ladle furnace, a three-strand, high-speed continuous billet caster, and a bar and section mill. It uses WinLink Flex technology for rolling mill for the first time in world. The company raised a total amount of US$154 million through 12 financial institutions as well as capital market and company's retained earnings for the expansion project. It purchased 8.85 acres of land for the new factory beside its old steel plant.

It collected term loans of $95 million from ODDO BHF Bank of Germany and $44.2 million from the World Bank, which were disbursed through commercial banks under the supervision of central bank of Bangladesh.

It started selling products of its new plant to local and foreign markets from September 2020. In 2023 and 2024, the company received "SDG Brand Champion Award" in the Responsible Production and Consumption category organised by Bangladesh Brand Forum in association with Aspire to Innovate (a2i). In August 2024, the company announced its plans to issue rights shares to raise BDT 242 crore in order to enhance production capacity and meet the increasing demand both locally and internationally.

== Controversies ==
In April 2019, Forest department of Bangladesh Government filed a case against GPH Ispat Limited authorities accusing them of destroying the environment by cutting 15,175 ft^{3} hills and constructing makeshift dams in a protected area, and by stopping the flow of water in the area, changing course and character of the natural stream and damaging biodiversity that caused heavy financial loss. Later on, GPH Ispat published a clarification through national dailies. According to them, it was a preparatory work of the rain water harvesting project, not makeshift dam.

In August 2023, as per request of the company, the case was transferred to the High Court of Bangladesh, which issued a stay order. In June 2024, news reports indicated that the company had constructed a concrete dam in the same natural reservoir, despite the stay order from the High Court remaining in effect.

In August 2024, an investigation by Chittagong district administration found that GPH Ispat caused flooding in two Sitakunda villages by blocking and redirecting natural canals, affecting around 2,500 people. The company authority dismissed the report as biased.

== See also ==
- BSRM Steels Limited
