= Building Technology & Ideas Ltd. =

Real estate developer in Bangladesh

building technology & ideas ltd.
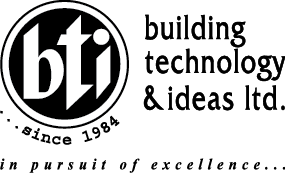
- Type: Conglomerate
- Industry: Real Estate
- Founded: 1984
- Founder: Mr. Arshi Haider
- Headquarters: Gulshan-2, Dhaka, Bangladesh.
- Revenue: ▲$150 million
- Number of employees: 1000–1200
- Website: www.btibd.com

Building Technology & Ideas (BTI) is a real estate developing company in Bangladesh. Its head office is located in Gulshan, Dhaka, and it has one other branch office in Chittagong.

== History ==
BTI started in Dhaka, Bangladesh in 1984 by developing residential apartments and condominiums and, in later years, began developing commercial properties. Initially founded as a partnership, it was bought out by its founding partner, Arshi Haider, in 1995.

Its startup head office was located beside Sher-e-Bangla National Cricket Stadium in BRTC Building at Mirpur, Dhaka. In 1989, the company moved its office to the TMC Building in Eskaton followed by the final move to its own premise at Gulshan in Celebration Point.

Over the years, BTI has developed different collections catering to different socio-economic sectors. The ranges are categorized under: The Platinum Collection, The Premium Collection, The Classic Collection, The Standard Collection and The Commercial Collection. From 2011 to 2016, BTI added "Standard Collection". As of 2009, BTI was working on plans to develop international standard gated communities.

== List of other businesses ==
The list of other businesses by BTI are listed below:

- bti Brokerage
- bti Building Products.
- Square Feet Story
- Iconic Spaces
- The Business Center
- bti Property Management
- Get Smart by bti

== See also ==
- List of companies of Bangladesh
