= Nasir Group =

- Company type: Private
- Industry: Conglomerate
- Founder: Nasir Uddin Biswas
- Headquarters: Kushtia, Bangladesh
- Products: Float glass, melamine, printing and packages, tobacco, footwear, glassware & tube, energy saving lamp
- Website: www.nasirgroupbd.com

Nasir Group is a Bangladeshi industrial conglomerate. The industries under this conglomerate include industrial glass, tobacco, printing and packages, and light engineering (light bulbs). AK Group was established in the 1977 by Nasir Uddin Biswas, managing director and chairman of Nasir Group.

== List of companies ==
- Nasir Biri Industries Limited (NBIL)
- Nasir Tobacco Industries Limited (NTIL)
- Nasir Leaf Tobacco Industries Limited (NLT)
- Nasir Glass (Float) Industries Limited (NGIL)
- Bangladesh Melamine Industries Limited (NTIL)
- Nasir Printing Packaging industries Limited (NPPIL)
- Nasir Glassware & Tube Industries Limited ( NGTIL)
- Bangladesh Footwear Industries Limited (Jump Keds)
- Nasir Energy saving Lamp Industries Limited (NESLIL)
- Biswas Printing & Packaging Industries Limited
- Nasir Starch Company Limited (NSCL)

== See also ==
- List of companies of Bangladesh
