= Hatil =

Bangladeshi furniture company

HATIL Complex Ltd.
- Type: Private
- Industry: Furniture
- Founded: 1989
- Headquarters: Dhaka, Bangladesh
- Key people: Selim H. Rahman (Chairman and MD)
- Revenue: ▲ ৳428 crore (US$35 million) (FY 2021-2022)
- Number of employees: 3,000+
- Website: www.hatil.com

Hatil is a Bangladeshi furniture manufacturer and retailer, based in Dhaka. The company was established in 1989 by Selim H. Rahman. Hatil traces its roots to H.A. Timber Industries Ltd., a company established in 1963 by Rahman's father, Al-Haj Habibur Rahman. Hatil has its presence in 18 countries and is the largest furniture exporter of Bangladesh.

== History ==
Hatil's roots can be traced to H.A. Timber Industries Ltd., a timber company which was established in 1963 by Selim H. Rahman's father, Al- Haj Habibur Rahman. Selim H. Rahman joined his father's company in the late 1980s and came up with the idea to manufacture door commercially.

Hatil was founded in 1989 by Selim H. Rahman and initially started as Hatil Doors, a small-scale door manufacturing shop in Old Dhaka. In 1990, the company started to receive orders from pharmaceutical companies to make doors. In 1993, Hatil rented a 5,000 sq. ft. facility in Kuril. In 1995, the company started making almirah and beds, and by the following year, it had expanded to making various types of home furniture.

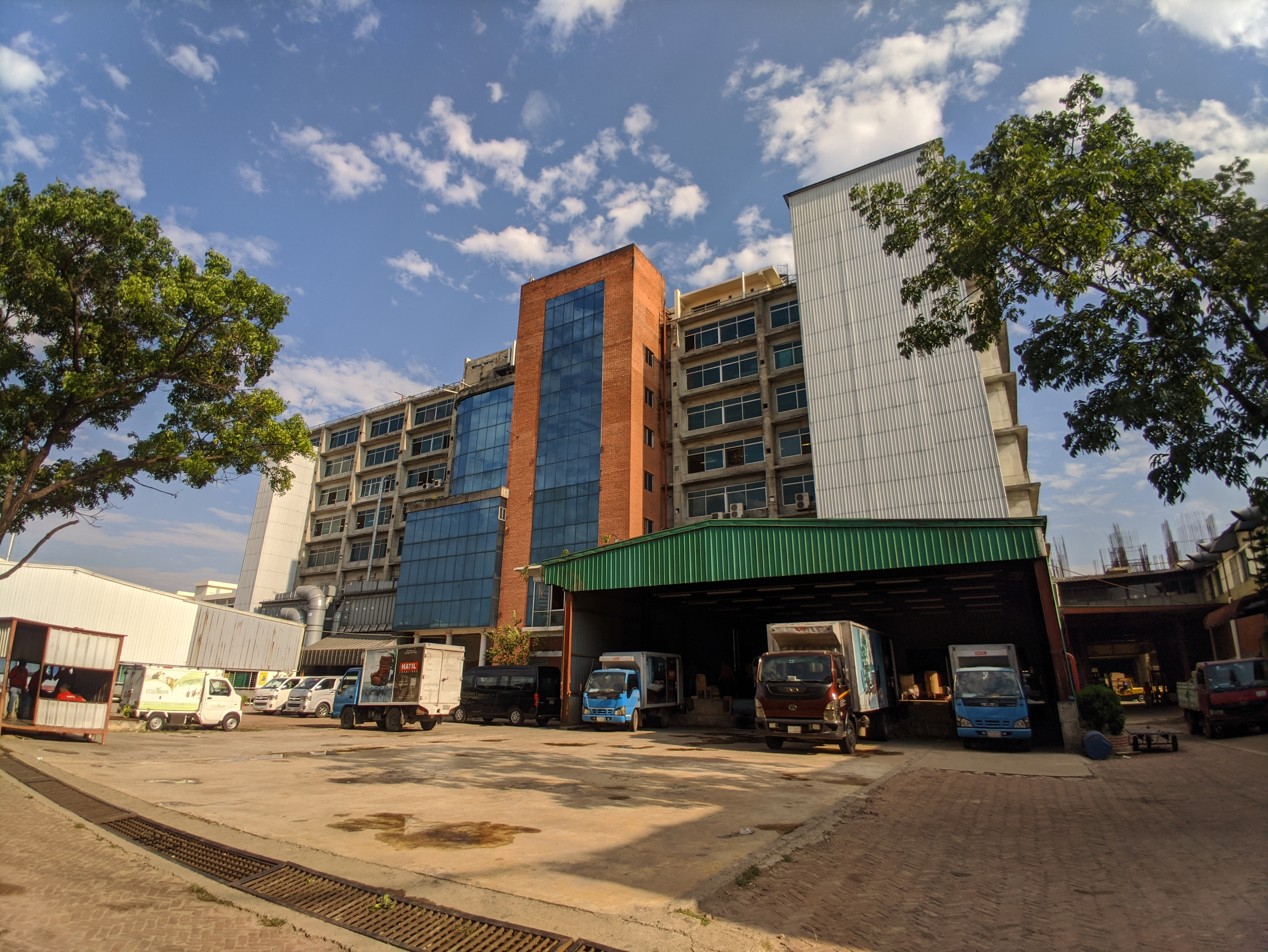
Hatil factory at Dhaka

During its early years, the furniture was made manually by 100 workers using locally sourced teak wood. In 2000, the company entered a joint venture with a South Korean company and transitioned to mechanised operations. As the demand increased, it rented factories in Shyampur Thana and Farashganj. In 2006, it began production of furniture from its own facility in Savar. In 2007, the company adopted the principles of Kaizen in its business operations. Since 2009, Hatil has been using beech wood imported from Germany in its furniture due to a scarcity of teak in Bangladesh.

In 2013, Hatil opened its first overseas showroom in Sydney, Australia, and also made its first OEM export to Kuwait, Saudi Arabia and the United States. In 2014, it opened its second overseas showroom in Toronto, Canada. In 2015, it established a collaboration with German furniture manufacturer Nolte Group, as a result of which Hatil-Nolte became the authorised licensee of Nolte Kitchen in Bangladesh. Hatil also received the Forest Stewardship Council's sustainability certification for its furniture in 2015.

Between 2016 and 2017, Hatil expanded its operations to Nepal and Bhutan. In 2017, it entered the Indian market under a franchising model, opening its first showroom in Chandigarh. Hatil then inaugurated a 50,000 sq. ft. furniture showroom at Mirpur, reportedly the largest in Bangladesh. In 2018, it launched its e-commerce website as well as a virtual store to exhibit its full range of furniture in virtual reality.

In 2019, Hatil invested more than ৳200 crore (US$16 million) to upgrade the machinery at its Zirani Bazar factory, which reportedly doubled its production capacity.

== Operations ==
As of 2023, Hatil has 75 showrooms in Bangladesh, 27 in India and 2 in Bhutan. It also maintains business in the United States, Canada, Australia, Saudi Arabia, Kuwait, United Arab Emirates, Thailand, Egypt and Russia.

== Manufacturing ==
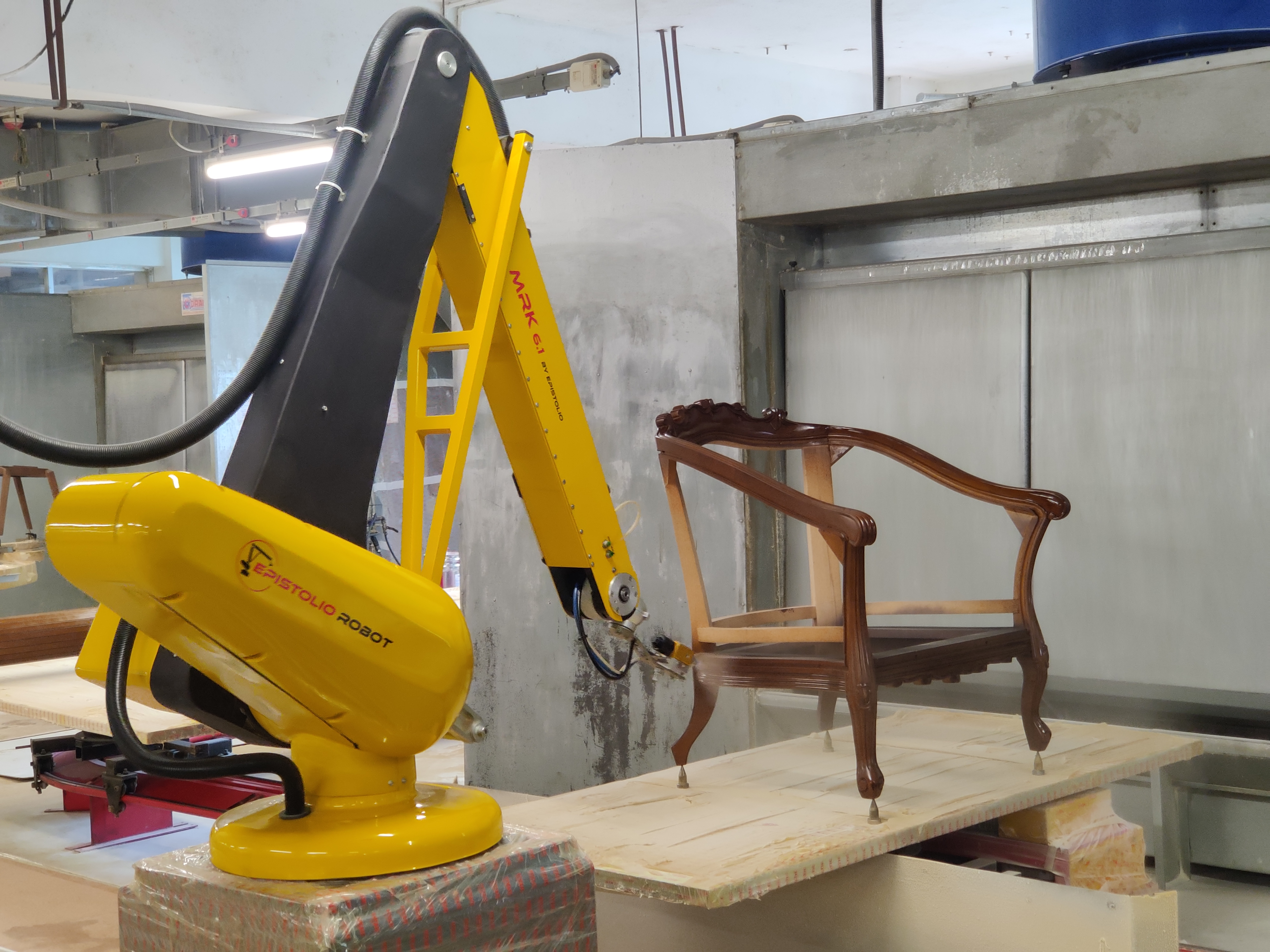
A robotic arm applying lacquer finish to a chair at Hatil factory

Hatil makes both home and office furniture from wood, melamine-laminated particle board, medium-density fibreboard, cane and metal. Its two factories are located in Zirani Bazar and Savar, one of which produces particle board and engineered wood, while the other makes furniture products. It has a productive capacity of 48,000 items of furniture per month.

Hatil imports oak wood from North America, beech wood from Germany, fabrics from China and India, and hardware like lock, handle and latch from China and Malaysia. Equipment used in its factories such as robotic cutting machine, knitting machine and robotic spray have been imported mainly from Germany, Italy and the United States. Hatil employs more than 3,000 people and follows the lean manufacturing production method. Many processes such as computer-aided design machinery, lacquering, UV curing, CNC machining and precision cutting are handled by its automated robotic systems.

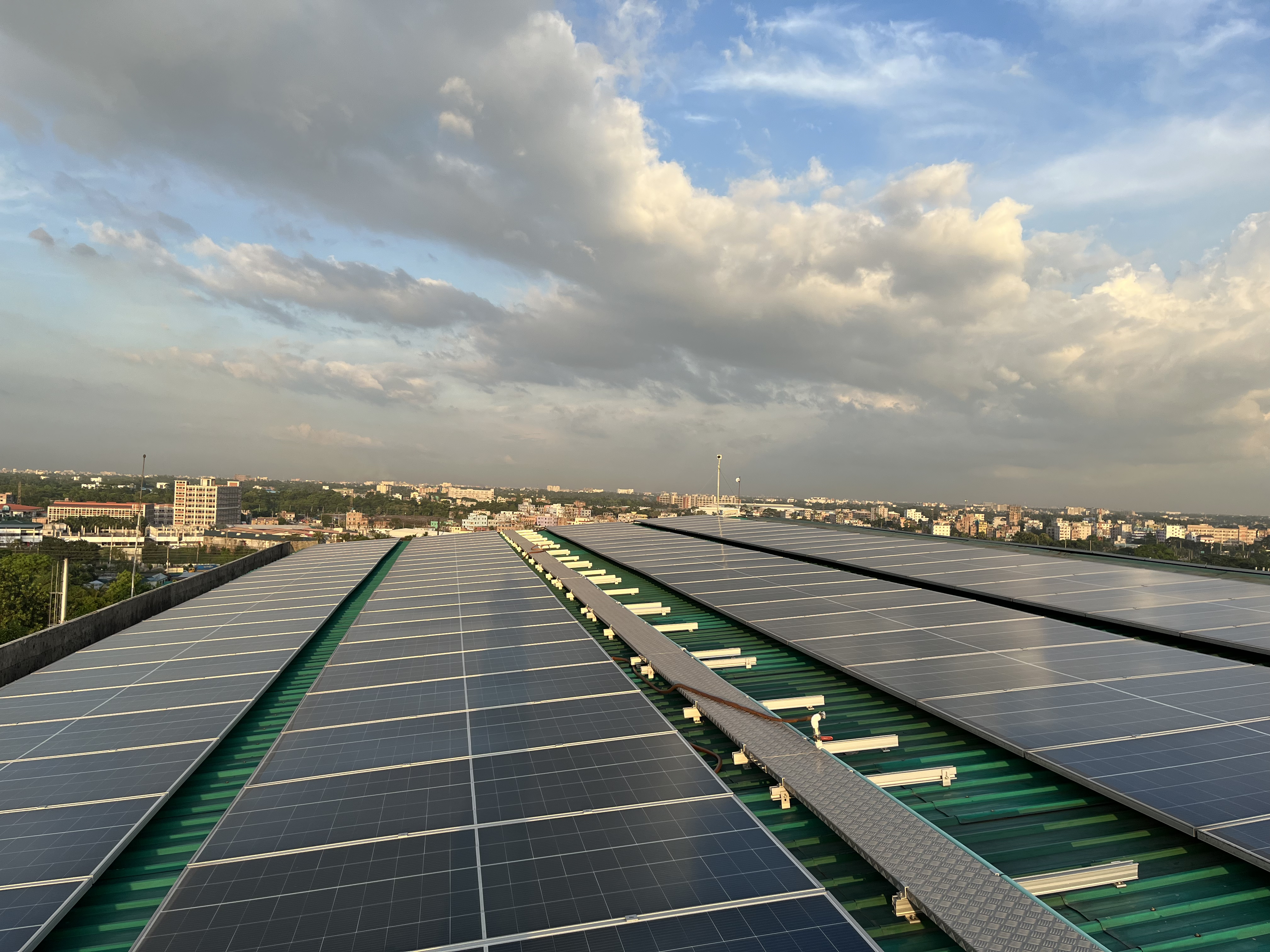
Rooftop solar panels at Hatil factory

=== Sustainability ===
Hatil uses FSC-certified wood in its furniture, and incorporates green manufacturing practices. The dust collector machine at its manufacturing facility accumulates wood dust which is converted into briquette and used as fuel. The company recycles sawdust and wood offcuts into particle boards, as well as fabric and foam leftovers into rebounded mattresses. The rooftop solar project at its factory has a capacity of 2.67 MW of renewable energy.

== Board of directors ==
- Selim H. Rahman (Chairman & Managing Director)
- Mahfuzur Rahman (Director)
- Md. Mizanur Rahman Mamun (Director)
- Moshiur Rahman (Director)
- Shafiqur Rahman (Director)

== Awards and recognition ==
- HSBC-The Daily Star Climate Award in Green Operations: 2013
- National Board of Revenue Award for highest Value Added Tax (VAT) taxpayers: 2018, 2019, 2020
- Bangladesh Retail Award for Best Retailer in Furniture: 2021
- HSBC Business Excellence Award for Best in Import Substitution: 2022
- Superbrands Bangladesh Award: 2023–24
- Dhaka International Trade Fair Award for Best Furniture Manufacturer: 2024
- SDG Brand Champion Award: 2024
- Bangladesh C-Suite Award for CEO of the Year: 2024 (Selim H. Rahman)

== Charitable activities ==
Hatil runs a school for the children of its employees as a corporate social responsibility initiative.

== Partnerships and initiatives ==
- In July 2022, Hatil participated in the INDEX Trade Fair in Delhi.
- In August 2022, Hatil signed a concessional loan agreement with Infrastructure Development Company to set up rooftop solar project at its factory in Gazipur.
- In September 2022, Hatil tied up with Grameenphone and launched a privilege programme for GPStar customers.
- In October 2022, Hatil took part in the five-day 2022 National Furniture Fair.

== See also ==
- List of companies of Bangladesh
