= Regent Power Limited =

- Founded: 2007
- Headquarters: Bangladesh

Regent Power is a Private Limited company incorporated in 2007 and a concern of Habib Group of Chittagong. The plant is located at Barabkunda in Chittagong under independent power producers (IPP) arrangement of the government. Regent Power is operating on natural gas with the capacity to produce 22 MW.

== See also ==
- Electricity sector in Bangladesh
- List of power stations in Bangladesh
