= Latifpur =

Latifpur লতিফপুর
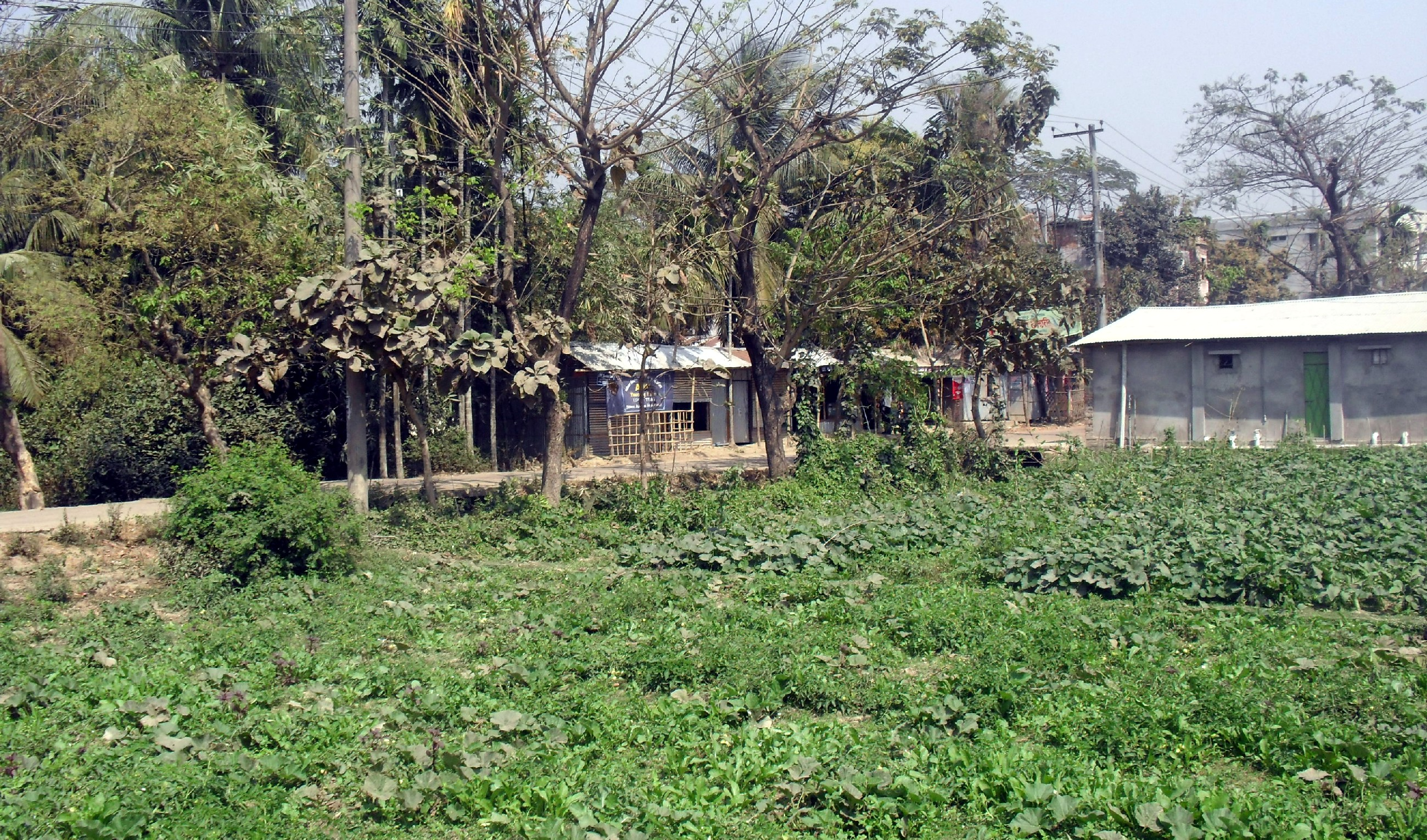
- Latifpur village along with Chhadu Ullah Munsi Road at the center

- Location in Bangladesh
- Coordinates: 22°22′39.8″N 91°45′50″E
- Country: Bangladesh
- Division: Chittagong Division
- District: Chittagong District

Population (2011)
  - Total: 9,901
- Time zone: UTC+6 (Bangladesh Time)
- Postal code: 4217

Latifpur (Bengali: লতিফপুর Lotifpur) is a village in Chittagong District in the Chittagong Division of southern Bangladesh. It is situated in Salimpur Union, which until 2013 was in Sitakunda Upazila. In January 2013, four new thanas were created in Chittagong District. Latifpur is now in Akbarshah Thana. Salimpur is situated at the north, Colonelhat at the south and Bay of Bengal situated at the west. Two port connecting road highway and railway passes through Latifpur. High school, primary school sets of kindergarten are situated in this area.
