= Regent Airways =

Bangladeshi airline

Regent Airways রিজেন্ট এয়ারওয়েজ
| IATA | ICAO | Call sign |
|---|---|---|
| RX | RGE | REGENT |
- Founded: 2010
- Commenced operations: 10 November 2010
- Ceased operations: March 2020
- Hubs: Hazrat Shahjalal International Airport
- Secondary hubs: Shah Amanat International Airport
- Frequent-flyer program: Regent Club
- Fleet size: 4 (Note: All aircraft are grounded.)
- Destinations: 11 (Note: All flights are suspended.)
- Parent company: HG Aviation Ltd
- Headquarters: Uttara, Dhaka
- Key people: Yasin Ali (chairman); Mashruf Habib (MD); Hanif Zakaria (CCO); Ashish Choudhury (COO)
- Employees: 850 (approximate)
- Website: www.flyregent.com

Regent Airways (Bengali: রিজেন্ট এয়ারওয়েজ) was a Bangladeshi airline owned by HG Aviation Ltd, a fully owned subsidiary of Habib Group. It is based at Hazrat Shahjalal International Airport. In March 2020, due to the COVID-19 outbreak, the airline suspended its operation and has not resumed since due to financial complicacies. It has been looking for investors to raise funds and resume operations ever since.

== History ==
Regent Airways was founded in 2010, and its operations began on 10 November of the same year. It is headquartered at Siaam Tower in Uttara, Dhaka. It expanded its fleet with two Boeing 737-700 aircraft on a six-year lease from ILFC, and launched international flights in July 2013 – Kuala Lumpur in July, Bangkok in October, Chittagong-Kolkata flights in October, Dhaka-Kolkata flights in November, and Singapore in December. The carrier launched flights to Bangkok directly from Chittagong on 27 April 2014. In April 2016, the carrier launched flights to Muscat, its fifth international destination.

Until December 2021, the airline, due to its financial woes, and having only two aircraft at disposal, restricted its destinations to only eight cities, three being Dhaka, Chittagong and Cox's Bazar and five international routes, i.e. Doha, Kolkata, Kuala Lumpur, Muscat and Singapore.

On March 29, 2023, the airline's request to liquidate was approved by Bangladesh's High Court as a result of the airline's mounting debts. The airline had not operated flight since March 2020.

== Destinations ==
As of January 2018, Regent Airways served the following three domestic and seven international destinations. However, since March 2020, due to the COVID-19 outbreak, all flights have been suspended.

| Country | City | Airport | Notes/refs |
|---|---|---|---|
| Bangladesh | Chittagong | Shah Amanat International Airport | Secondary hub |
| Bangladesh | Cox's Bazar | Cox's Bazar Airport | Suspended |
| Bangladesh | Dhaka | Hazrat Shahjalal International Airport | Hub |
| Bangladesh | Jessore | Jessore Airport | Suspended |
| Bangladesh | Saidpur | Saidpur Airport | Suspended |
| Bangladesh | Sylhet | Osmani International Airport | Suspended |
| India | Kolkata | Netaji Subhas Chandra Bose International Airport | Suspended |
| Malaysia | Kuala Lumpur | Kuala Lumpur International Airport | Suspended |
| Nepal | Kathmandu | Tribhuvan International Airport | Suspended |
| Oman | Muscat | Muscat International Airport | Suspended |
| Qatar | Doha | Hamad International Airport | Suspended |
| Saudi Arabia | Dammam | King Fahd International Airport | Suspended |
| Singapore | Singapore | Changi Airport | Suspended |
| Thailand | Bangkok | Suvarnabhumi Airport | Suspended |
| United Arab Emirates | Dubai | Dubai International Airport | Suspended |

== Fleet ==
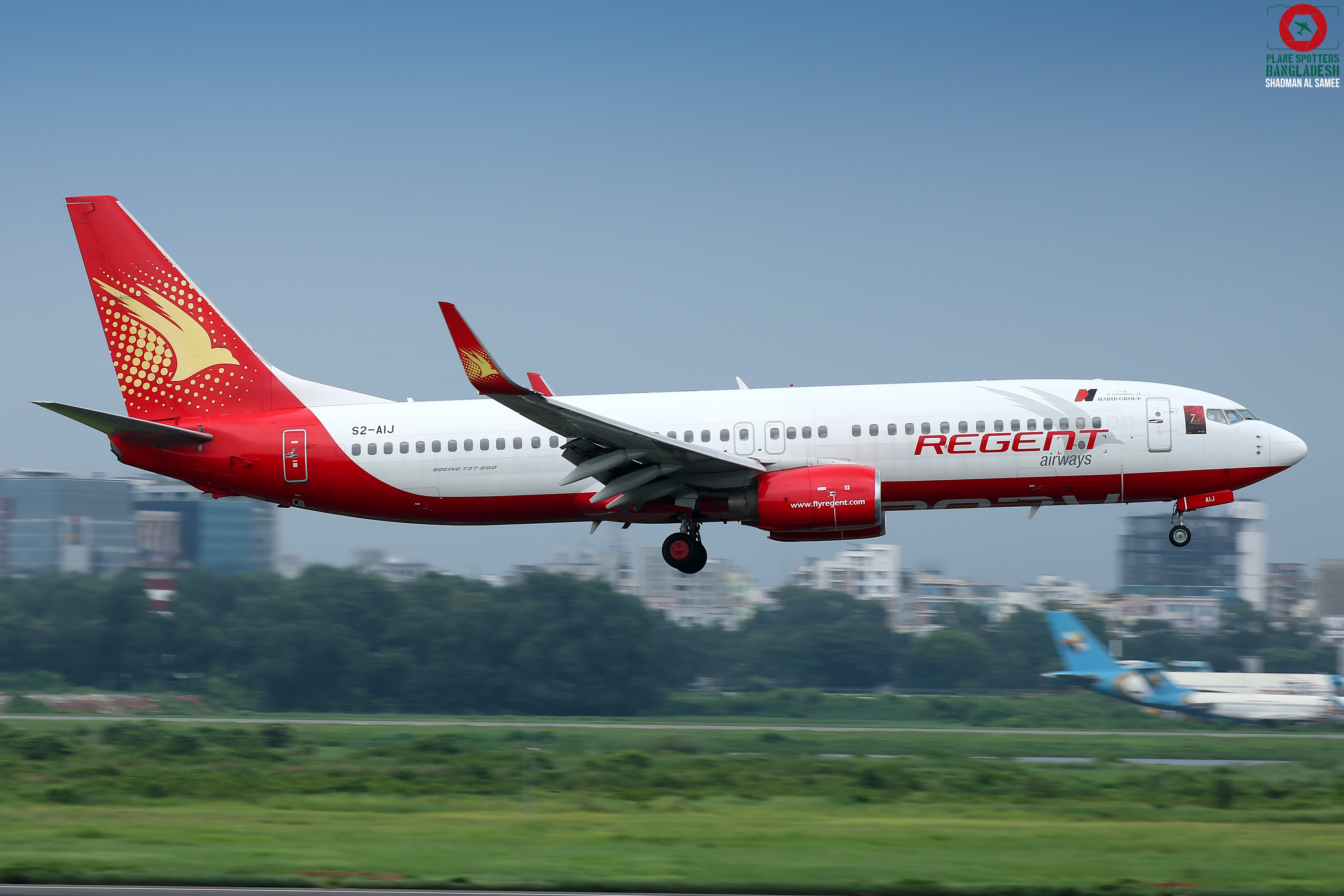
Regent Airways Boeing 737-800 at Shahjalal International Airport

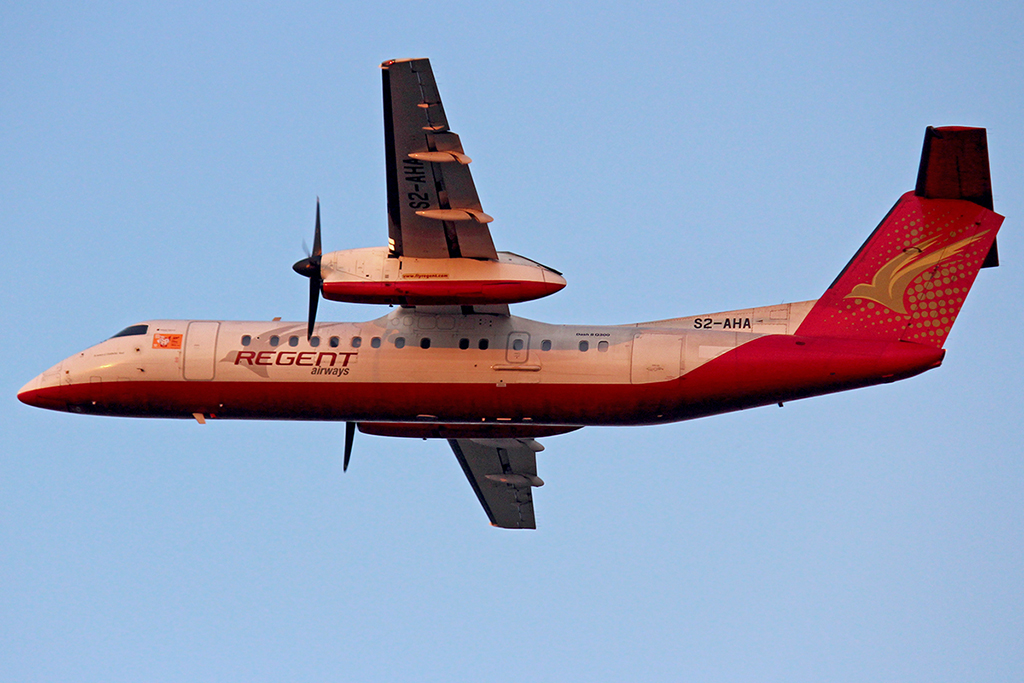
Regent Airways Dash-8-Q300

=== Current fleet ===
Regent Airways no longer operates a fleet after ceasing operations in March 2020.

=== Historical fleet ===
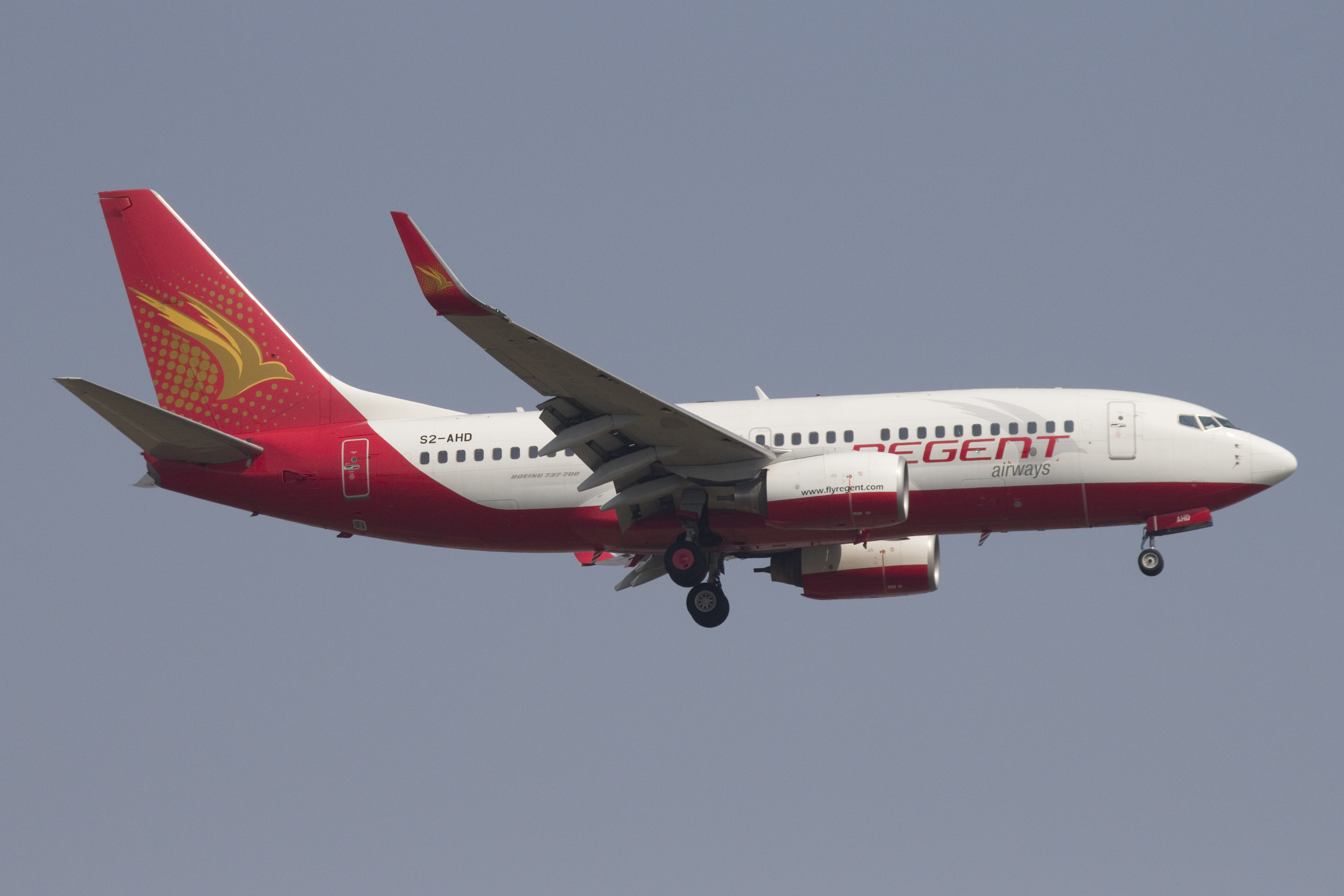
Regent Airways Boeing 737-700 at Bangkok Suvarnabhumi

- 1 x Boeing 737-800, withdrawn from use and stored at Shahjalal International Airport
- 2 x Boeing 737-700, returned to the leasing company after lease period and scrapped
- 2 x Bombardier Dash 8 Q300, stored for technical and financial woes
- 3 x Boeing 737-800, returned to the leasing company. S2-AIJ went to Black Rock as N705BR, was converted to an all-cargo configuration and delivered to Express Air Cargo. S2-AIH went to GECAS as N539RL. S2-AIV went to Merx Aviation as 2-SIVA

== Services ==
=== Seating configuration ===
The two Bombardier Dash-8-Q300s each had a seating arrangement for 50 passengers in an undivided single-class layout. All seats had a generous pitch of 32 inches and individual tray-tables in a four-abreast seating arrangement (except for Row 1 of two seats, D & F forming a club-seating with Row 2 D & F seats) across the cabin. The Boeing 737-700s was configured in a 126 seating capacity, with 12 business class and 142 economy class seats. The economy class seats were configured with a 33-inch seat pitch, and the 12 business class seats had 45-inch reclining seats. In the 737-800s, the economy class was fitted with a 29- to 31-inch pitch; it had 159 seats with eight business class seats (Reg: S2-AIJ), and the capacity was 168 with 15 premium economy class seats (Reg: S2-AIH) with a 33- to 38-inch seat pitch.

=== In-flight amenities ===
On board short domestic flights, snacks were provided. The two Bombardier Dash-8-Q300s did not have in-flight entertainment. On international flights, traditional cuisines were also provided. In-flight meals were supplied by Biman Flight Catering Centre. On board the Boeing 737-700s, in-flight entertainment was provided through the Passenger Service Units (PSU) in economy class, while personal iPads were provided in business class. However, the same could not have been said about the two Bombardier Dash-8-Q300s as they did not offer in-flight entertainment.

== See also ==
- List of airlines of Bangladesh
- Transport in Bangladesh
- List of defunct airlines of Bangladesh
