= Rangs Group =

Bangladeshi multinational conglomerate company

- Industry: Automobile Electronics, Real Estate, Shipping, Pharmaceuticals, Food & Beverage
- Founded: 1979; 47 years ago
- Founder: Abdur Rouf Chowdhury
- Headquarters: Dhaka, Bangladesh
- Area served: Bangladesh
- Key people: Zakia Rouf Chowdhury (Executive Vice Chairman)
- Website: www.rangsgroup.com

Rangs Group is a Bangladeshi industrial conglomerate founded in 1979. The industries under this conglomerate include automobile, real estate, shipping, and pharmaceuticals.

It is the official dealer of Mahindra, Eicher and Dongfeng in Bangladesh.

== History ==
Abdur Rouf Chowdhury was the founding chairman of Rangs Group, died on 18 February 2023.

Ranks Agro Biotech was established by the group in 2000.

Rangs Pharmaceuticals Limited was established in 2003.

Ranks Real Estate Limited was established in 2008 and marked the entry of the group in real estate.

Zest Polymer Limited was established in 2009 to manufacture polymer and plastic bottles for the pharmaceutical industry.

== Subsidiaries ==
- Bank Asia Limited
- Reliance Insurance Limited
- Dolonchapa Express Limited
- Sea Resource Limited
- Zhen Natural Limited
- Shield Security Service Limited
- Rangs Motors Limited
- Ranks Commercial Vehicle Limited
- Ranks Motors Workshop Limited
- ZRC Engineering And Automobiles Limited
- Metro Foils Limited
- Rangs Pharmaceuticals Limited
- Zest Polymer Limited
- Ranks Construction Limited
- Ranks Agro Biotech Limited
- Ranks Powertech Limited
- Ranks Real Estate Limited
- Ranks Interiors Limited
- Ranks Food And Beverage Limited
