= IDLC Finance PLC =

Bangladeshi financial services company

- Company type: Publicly traded
- Traded as: DSE: IDLC
- Industry: Financial services
- Founded: 1985 (as a leasing company); 2012 (as IDLC Finance)
- Headquarters: Bay's Galleria (1st Floor), 57 Gulshan Avenue, Dhaka-1212, Bangladesh
- Area served: Bangladesh
- Key people: M. Jamal Uddin (CEO and MD)
- Products: Investment banking; Corporate finance; Consumer banking
- Operating income: ▲BDT 5.82 Billion (2018)
- Net income: ▲BDT 2.17 Billion (2018)
- Total assets: BDT 109.17 Billion
- Website: idlc.com

IDLC Finance PLC, formerly known as Industrial Development Leasing Company of Bangladesh Limited (IDLC), is a multi-product non-banking financial institution with headquarters in Dhaka, Bangladesh. It offers financial services in the form of small and medium enterprise (SME) finance products, supplier and distributor finance, corporate finance, structured finance, retail finance, deposits and treasury products. The IDLC group also provides merchant banking, stock broker and asset management services via its three subsidiaries, IDLC Investments Limited, IDLC Securities Limited and IDLC Asset Management Limited, respectively.

== History ==
IDLC was established in 1985 by the initiation of IFC of the World Bank. The company was formed via collaboration of International Finance Corporation, German Investment and Development Company, Korea Development Financing Corporation, Aga Khan Fund for Economic Development, Kookmin Bank, IPDC Finance Limited of Bangladesh and Sadharan Bima Corporation. It has since emerged as a fully locally owned financial institution.

The Emerging Credit Rating Limited (ECRL) has given AAA long term credit rating and ECRL-1 short term credit rating to the IDLC Finance Limited.

In 2026, IDLC Finance reports 22% net profit growth, it has ended the first quarter of 2026 with remarkable growth, achieving a consolidated net profit after tax (NPAT) of Tk 62.2 crore. This indicates a significant 22% growth over the previous year 2025.

== Subsidiaries ==
The following are the subsidiaries for IDLC Finance PLC:

- IDLC Securities Limited
- IDLC investments Limited
- IDLC Asset Management Limited

== Shareholders ==
List of top largest shareholders of IDLC:

City Bank PLC (23.31%):

- City Bank PLC (9%)
- City Bank Capital Resources Ltd. (9.9%)
- City Brokerage Ltd. (4.31%)

Transcom Group (13.33%):

- SK+F (8%)
- Transcraft Ltd. (4.01)
- Bangladesh Lamps Ltd. (1.32%)

Mercantile Bank PLC (5.5%):

- Mercantile Bank PLC (3.5%)
- Mercantile Bank Securities Ltd. (2%)

Investment Corporation of Bangladesh (8.12%)

Sadharan Bima Corporation (7.62%)

Reliance Insurance Limited (7%)

== See also ==
- IDLC Investments Limited
- IDLC Asset Management Limited
- IFC
- Non-bank financial institution
