= Mask Associates =

Jute manufacturing business in Bangladesh

Mask Associates (pvt.) Ltd.
- Company type: Private
- Industry: Jute trade, manufacturing
- Founded: 1982
- Founder: S.B. Kader
- Headquarters: Dhaka, Bangladesh
- Area served: Worldwide
- Key people: S. B. Kader (Chairman), Syed Mustaq Kader (Managing Director)
- Products: Raw Jute and Jute Yarn, hessian/sacking cloth/bag, and caddies
- Revenue: US$5 Million-US$10 Million
- Number of employees: 50+
- Website: http://mask.associates/

MASK Associates is a social business registered in Bangladesh that manufactures and exports raw jute and jute products. The company was established in 1982 by S.B. Kader, a Commercially Important Person (CIP) as declared by the Ministry of Commerce and Industry in Bangladesh. MASK Associates began its journey by representing REB Willcox of London, UK. The company currently exports raw jute and jute yarn, hessian/sacking cloth/bags, and caddies worldwide.

A Social Business is one that is created and designed to address a social problem as a non-loss and non-dividend company. With a company philosophy focused on addressing green issues and promoting green business through a product that is, in itself, environmentally sound, MASK Associates falls within this definition.

In 1993, Director Syed Mustaq Kader, son of S.B. Kader, took up leadership of the company and currently functions in the role of Managing Director. One of the key achievements of the company was the development of a system to clean-up oil spillages using jute during the Deepwater Horizon oil spill in 2010, a solution that was acknowledged by United States Environmental Protection Agency (EPA).

MASK Associates is an ISO Certified Company for the standardisations ISO 9001:2015 (Quality) and ISO 14001:2015 (Environment), since 2012 and 2015. In 2018, the company received an A credit rating from Alpha Rating Limited.

In 2024, MASK Associates was appointed as the Delegate Bag Sponsor for the World Cocoa Conference held in Brussels. MASK MD Syed Mustaq Kader was a key participant in a panel on Sanitary and Phytosanitary Measures which addressed the health hazards facing agricultural workers and measures that can be taken to prevent and minimise risks.

Recognition and Awards

In 2024, MASK Associates was recognised as Asia's Most Promising SME 2024 by the Asia Corporate Excellence & Sustainability Awards:ACES Awards. The award recognises outstanding companies across Asia for their commitment to business excellence, sustainability, and innovation.

== Sources ==
- আশরাফ আলী তেলদূষণ থেকে সমুদ্রের জীববৈচিত্র্য রক্ষায় পরিবেশবান্ধব পাট ও পাটের দড়ি ব্যবহার, Daily Naya Diganta, 17 May 2018
- Credit Ratings, New Nation, November 15, 2018
- MASK Associates wins Asia's Most Promising SME Award, 2024.
