= Meghna Group =

Bangladeshi conglomerate

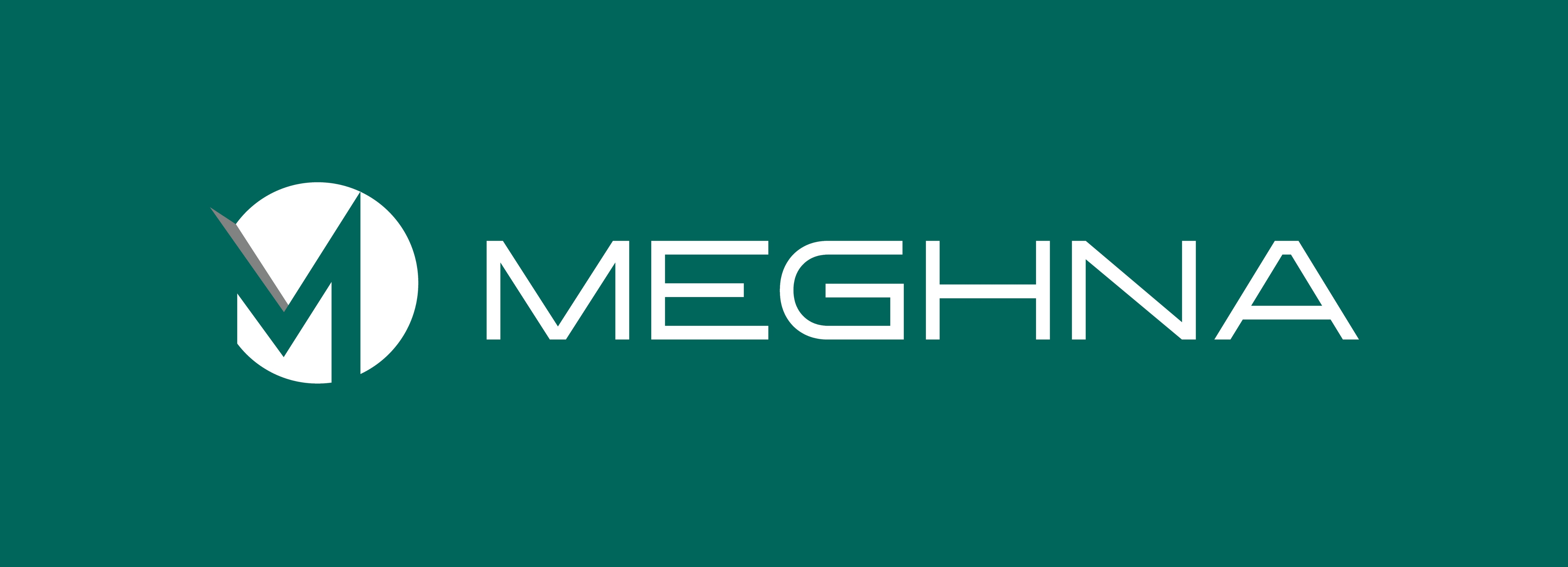
- Logo used since 2023
- Type: Private Company
- Industry: Bicycles; Bicycle Components; Tires and Tubes; Packaging; RMG; RMG Accessories; Automotive; Retail; Tableware; Finance; Agro and Dairy
- Founded: 1974
- Founder: Abdul Khalek Bhuiyan
- Headquarters: Dhaka, Bangladesh
- Area served: Asia; Europe; North America
- Key people: Mr. Mohammad Mizanur Rahman Bhuiyan (Chairman); Mr. Rashiqur Rahman Mahin (Vice-Chairman); Mr. Abrar Rahman (Director); Mr. Mohammad Mushtaque Ahmed Tanvir (Director); Mr. Md. Hedayetul Islam (Chief Financial Officer); Mr. Md. Shahidullah Shahid (Chief Operating Officer); Mr. M Mohsinul Islam Sohel (Chief Operating Officer, Bike Division); Mr. Md. Luthful Bari (Chief Executive Officer, Tire Division)
- Brands: BMW Bangladesh; Everest; Ford Bangladesh; French Collection Melamine; Kia Bangladesh; Kohler Bangladesh; Meghna Car Manufacturing Limited; Mohammad and Sons; MTF; MeghnaTec; Prince Bicycles; Reflex Bicycles; Seventy One Bicycles; Veloce Bicycles
- Revenue: $450 million+
- Number of employees: 7,000+
- Website: meghna.com.bd

Meghna Group is a Bangladeshi conglomerate. It is present in automobile, light engineering, bicycle, tire, cement, packaging and textile industries. Meghna Group was established by Mizanur Rahman Bhuiyan. It is Bangladesh's largest bicycle manufacturer and exporter and the first local company to start exporting bicycles. Meghna Group is also into the manufacture and export of garments. Meghna Group is also a car distributor for BMW, KIA, and Ford in Bangladesh. Recently, the company has started car manufacturing under the name of Meghna Car Manufacturing Ltd.

Meghna Group has also invested in Prime Bank, a commercial bank in Bangladesh.

== History ==
In January 2023, M&U Motors has launched Ford in Bangladesh as exclusive distributor of different models of Ford passenger and commercial vehicles. In June 2023, Executive Motors launches BMW 735i in Bangladesh. In 2024, Meghna Car Manufacturing started its operation by assembling KIA passenger cars in Bangladesh.

=== Bicycle ===
Meghna is the largest bicycle manufacturer and exporter in Bangladesh, followed by Alita Bangladesh and Pran-RFL respectively. It produced 900 thousand bicycles annually in 2023.

In 2024, a collaborative effort involving Meghna Group started producing carbon fiber component for bike parts.

== List of companies ==
- M&U Cycles Ltd.
- M&U Packaging Ltd.
- Beta Packaging Ltd.
- Reflex packaging Ltd.
- Beta Packaging Ltd.
- Meghna Automobiles Ltd (Kia Motors, etc.)
- Executive Motors Ltd (BMW)
- M&U Motors Ltd (Ford)
- Veloce Bicycles
- Mohammad & Sons
- Kohler
- Hana System Limited
- AlCa Industries Ltd.
- Alpha Carbon Technology Ltd.
- Meghna Denims Ltd.
- Uniglory Washing Ltd.
- Transworld Bicycle Co. Ltd
- Uniglory Cycle Industries Ltd
- Mahin Cycles Ltd
- Uniglory Cycle Components Ltd
- Abrar Steels Ltd.
- Meghna Bearing Ltd.
- Meghna Rubber Industries Ltd
- Uniglory Wheels Ltd
- Meghna Knit Composite Ltd.
- Uniglory Packaging Industries Limited
- Meghna Mainetti Limited
- Uniglory Components Limited
- Siam-Bangla Industries Limited
- Executive Technologies Ltd. (Acer etc.)
- Executive Machines Limited (Apple etc.)
- Uniglory Paper & Packing Ltd
- Meghna Innova Rubber Co. Ltd.
- Cycle Life Exclusive Ltd.
- Antics Graphic Ltd.
- M&N Fashion.
- Meghna Melamine Industries Ltd.
- Uniglory Tyres Industries Limited
- Executive Woodworks Ltd.
- Suntec Tyre Limited
- Uniglory steel products ltd
- Meghna Car Manufacturing Ltd.

== See also ==
- List of companies of Bangladesh
