= General Pharma =

Bangladeshi pharmaceutical company

General Pharmaceuticals Limited
- Company type: Pharmaceutical
- Industry: Manufacturing of pharmaceutical finished products
- Founded: 1984
- Headquarters: Shyamoli, Dhaka, Bangladesh
- Key people: Momenul Haq, Chairman
- Number of employees: around 3000
- Website: generalpharma.com

General Pharmaceuticals Limited is a pharmaceutical company based in Dhaka, Bangladesh since 1987.

== History ==
General Pharmaceuticals Ltd. (GPL) was incorporated as a private limited company on 5 April 1984. A.K.M Zahirul Alam was the managing director, and Gazi Nurun Nabi was director. The company began manufacturing drugs in 1987, initially with seven products. There are currently nearly 3000 employees, including around 2000 sales and marketing staff. The national distribution network has around 600 distribution workers.

== Production facilities ==
General Pharmaceuticals Ltd. Factory Unit-1.

The company's manufacturing facility is located 72 kilometres (45 mi) from Dhaka in Gazipur, where they produce dosage forms including tablets in film-coated, enteric-coated, dispersible, immediate release, modified release, sustained release and chewable, as well as immediate release capsules, modified-release capsules, enteric-coated capsules, liquid in hard gelatin capsules, lotions, ORS, syrups, suspensions, oral gels, antiseptic mouthwash, antiseptic solutions, powder for suspensions, creams, and ointments (water based and oil based).

General Pharmaceuticals Ltd. Factory Unit-2.

In 2011 the company extended their manufacturing facility, 77 kilometres (48 mi) from Dhaka in Gazipur.

The site has a total area of 29,792 square metres, and a building footprint of 14,444 square metres.

== Exports ==
The company sells its products in Bangladesh and exporting to both developed and developing countries. They export products registered in the following countries:

- Asia: Afghanistan, Bhutan, Cambodia, Sri Lanka, Myanmar, Hong Kong, Macau, Vietnam, Maldives, Philippines
- Africa: Kenya, Somalia, Mauritius, Nigeria, Burkina Faso, Libya
- Central and South America: Belize, Guatemala

GPL is also aiming to export to other countries in South East Asia, the Middle East, and Africa.
