= Sadharan Bima Corporation =

State-owned non-life insurer and sole reinsurer in Bangladesh

- সাধারণ বীমা কর্পোরেশন (Bengali)
- Abbreviation: SBC
- Formation: 1973
- Type: Government
- Headquarters: Dhaka, Bangladesh
- Location: 33, Dilkusha, Commercial Area, Dhaka
- Region served: Bangladesh
- Official language: Bengali
- Owner: Government of the People’s Republic of Bangladesh
- Chairman: M Nasim Ali
- Managing Director: Md. Harunur Rashid
- Parent organization: Financial Institutions Division, Ministry of Finance
- Website: www.sbc.gov.bd
- Remarks: Only State Owned Non-Life Insurer & Reinsurer in Bangladesh

Sadharan Bima Corporation (popularly known as SBC) is the one and only state-owned non-life insurer and sole reinsurer in Bangladesh under the Ministry of Finance, Government of the People's Republic of Bangladesh. Both Sadharan Bima Corporation, the non-life insurer, and Jiban Bima Corporation, the life insurer, were created under the Insurance Corporation Act (Act No. VI) of 1973 of Bangladesh.

Thereafter, SBC was acting as the sole insurer of general insurance till 1984. In the year 1984 Bangladesh Government allowed insurance companies in the private sector and to that effect promulgated the Insurance Corporations (Amendment) Ordinance 1984.

== History ==
For underwriting the non-life insurance business of Bangladesh, Sadharan Bima Corporation was formed by the government in the year 1973. Golam Mowla was appointed the first managing director of Sadharan Bima Corporation. Up until 1984, SBC was the sole insurer of non-life insurance business in the country. In the same year, some private sector non-life insurance companies started operation. Since then, it is providing reinsurance support to private sector non-life insurers. With regard to regulatory control, Insurance Development & Regulatory Authority of Bangladesh regulates all insurance companies in Bangladesh including Sadharan Bima Corporation. Sadharan Bima Corporation is the only insurer of properties owned by Government of Bangladesh. No other private non-life insurance companies are allowed to insure any public property.

Prime Minister Khaleda Zia laid the foundation of the headquarters building of Sadharan Bima Corporation on 27 August 2003. From 2003 to 2004, Akhtar Ahmed ACII served as the managing director of Sadharan Bima Corporation.

On 15 March 2005, the Parliamentary Standing Committee on Public Accounts led by Haroon Al Rashid began an investigation into the audit reports of the Bima Corporation.

The managing director of Bima Corporation, M Humayun Kabir, was appointed the secretary of the Bangladesh Election Commission.

Sadharan Bima Corporation has recently been very active in capturing all public sector insurance business, and experts say that this move will definitely enhance the revenue of the corporation. The company has faced censure from the Insurance Regulatory Agency for its failure in realisation of outstanding reinsurance premiums worth about Tk 4.0 billion (4 billion).

In 2008, private insurances companies demanded the government of Bangladesh change laws that force them to give 50 per cent reinsurance business to the Sadharan Bima Corporation.

In September 2016, Sadharan Bima Corporation opposed proposals by foreign contractors that public projects they are working on be insured by foreign insurance companies.

In April 2018, Sadharan Bima Corporation paid 57.4 million taka to US-Bangla Airlines after US-Bangla Airlines Flight 211 crashed. The corporation owed 3.64 billion taka 21 private insurance in reinsurance claims.

An agreement between Sadharan Bima Corporation and Bangladesh Insurance Association (BIA) was introduced for stabilizing non-life insurance market under which Sadharan Bima Corporation underwritten 100% Public Property Non-life Business and 50% of it was equally distributed among the private sector non-life insurance companies. Now As per Insurance Corporation Act 2019, under section-16, Sadharan Bima Corporation has solely right to underwrite 100% Public Property Non-life Business and 50% of Business is to be equally distributed among the private sector non-life insurance companies who, on the other hand, compulsorily re-insure half of their re-insurable business with the SBC.

The Bima corporation had insured MV Banglar Samriddhi which was sunk in the 2022 Russian invasion of Ukraine.

== Management ==
The board of directors of SBC consists of 11 member including one part-time chairman. Of the members, 9 are honorary (part-time) and the rest one, the chief executive officer of the company. M Nasim Ali is the chairman of Sadharan Bima Corporation.

== Zone offices ==
1. Dhaka Zone
2. Narayangonj Zone
3. Chattogram Zone
4. Khulna Zone
5. Rajshahi Zone
6. Cumilla Zone
7. Mymensingh Zone
8. Sylhet Zone

== Business performance ==
The business performance of SBC in the last decade or so is on an upward trend in comparison with the overall performance of the Bangladesh insurance sector. The repeated devastating insured events in the RMG sector of the country, namely 2013 Savar building collapse (Rana Plaza Tragedy), 2013 Standard Garment fire and 2012 Tazreen Fashion factory fire, have adversely impacted the performance of SBC despite sufficient reinsurance protection.Including its reinsurance operations, SBC’s total gross premium amounted to BDT 17,181 million in 2024, compared with BDT 12,009 million in 2023. Reinsurance accepted premiums increased to BDT 6,181 million in 2024 from BDT 3,726 million in 2023, nearly doubling year on year.

== Sponsor shareholding ==
SBC is the sponsor shareholder of Investment Corporation of Bangladesh, Industrial Development and Leasing Company, British American Tobacco Bangladesh, National Tea Company Limited, National Housing Finance and Investment Limited, Aramit Limited, Central Depository Bangladesh Limited, etc.

== Insurance services ==
The services provided by Sadharan Bima Corporation include insuring public and private property risks, providing liability insurance coverage, reinsurance of the risk underwritten by private non-life insurers, providing Risk Improvement Services, Industrial Development through Equity participation and Human Resources Development for Insurance Industry. Moreover, Sadharan Bima Corporation itself makes retro-cession to different overseas re-insurers.

== See also ==
- Sadharan Bima Corporation Sporting Club
