= Navana Group =

Bangladeshi conglomerate

- Type: Conglomerates
- Founder: Shafiul Islam Kamal
- Headquarters: Dhaka, Bangladesh.,
- Key people: Shafiul Islam Kamal (Chairman)
- Revenue: ▲US$126 million (2006)
- Website: www.navana.com

Navana Group is a Bangladeshi conglomerate. Navana Limited, its flagship company, is the exclusive distributor of Toyota cars since 1964.

The group also has business interests in real estate, construction, energy, furniture, food, welding and electrodes, electronics, logistics, and building products.

Shafiul Islam Kamal is the founder and chairman of Navana Group since 1996. His family members are in the positions of Board of Directors.

== History ==
In 1996, Navana Group under Shafiul Islam Kamal as chairman emerged as a separate legal entity from Islam Group one year after the death of its Chairman Jahurul Islam, older brother of Kamal, which was then the largest business group in Bangladesh.

== List of companies ==
The companies of Navana Group are listed below:

- Navana Automobiles Limited, a long-time sole agent of Toyota cars in Bangladesh under Navana Limited until Toyota moved to establish a new company as the sole distributor in September 2025. The termination of Toyota distributorship has been subject to a legal battle with allegations of fraud against Toyota Bangladesh MD and two senior Toyota officials.
- Aftab Automobiles Limited, a sister concern of Navana Group mainly a vehicle assembling and small parts manufacturing company. The company has been marketing Toyota & HINO vehicles for Bangladesh market since 1982, recently launched HINO -Mini bus.
- Navana Batteries Limited.
- Navana Real Estate Limited.
- Navana Construction Limited.
- Navana Building Products Limited
- Navana Interlinks Limited.
- Navana Biponon Limited.
- Navana Electronics Limited.
- Navana Logistics Limited
- Navana Petroleum Limited
- Navana Engineering Limited.
- Navana CNG Limited, a sister concern of Navana Group, is a CNG service provider in Bangladesh.
- Navana LPG Limited
- Navana Welding Electrode Limited
- Navana Furniture Limited
- Navana Foods Limited is the franchise holder of Gloria Jean's Coffees and La Tarte.
- Navana Engineering.

== Board of directors ==
Name	Position	Reference
Shafiul Islam Kamal	Chairman	Company's website
Saiful Islam	Senior vice-chairman	Company's website
Sajedul Islam	Vice-chairman	Company's website
Khaleda Islam	Director	Company's website
Farhana Islam	Director	Company's website

== See also ==
- List of companies of Bangladesh
