= Sajeeb Group =

Conglomerate company in Bangladesh

- Logo of Sajeeb Group
- Formation: 1982
- Headquarters: Dhaka, Bangladesh
- Region served: Bangladesh
- Official language: Bengali
- Website: sajeebgroup.com.bd

Sajeeb Group is a diversified Bangladeshi conglomerate that operates across various sectors including food and beverages, agro-processing, real estate, insurance, ready-made garments, telecommunications and electronic media. According to its own website, the group places emphasis on process quality control (PQC), sourcing raw materials under strict supervision, adopting modern technology, and using 100% food-grade packaging.

== History & Business Activities ==
Sajeeb Group traces its origins to 1982, expanding over subsequent decades through a number of sister concerns spanning consumer foods and non-food sectors. The group positions itself as one of the country’s larger business houses, with activities it says contribute to Bangladesh’s broader socio-economic development.

Its food and beverage division manufactures products under its own brand—Sajeeb—as well as under licences or franchises for international brands such as Shezan, Kolson and Nocilla. The group also reports exports to regions including the Middle East, Australia, the USA, UK, Nepal, Bhutan, Malaysia, Singapore and some African countries.

== Corporate Governance & Compliance ==
The group highlights its commitment to “international standards” in its production processes, via dedicated quality-control teams and established processes. In addition, their public profile indicates adherence to halal certification for their food and drink products through the Bangladesh-based certifier Halal Bangladesh Services (HBS) and use of raw materials from a supplier pool.

== Quality control and certifications ==
Sajeeb states that it operates a Process Quality Control (PQC) program, sources raw materials from vetted suppliers, and uses 100% food-grade packaging. The company also states that its foods and drinks have achieved “100% Halal certification” through Halal Bangladesh Services (HBS), a halal certification body recognized in industry directories and associations.

== Export & Growth ==
According to the company, exports began in 2010, initially to Bhutan, and now span the Gulf/Middle East, Oceania (Australia), the USA, SAARC markets (including Nepal and Bhutan), Malaysia, Singapore and several African countries. Trade reporting has also noted Sajeeb’s presence in Bangladesh’s processed-food exports. Third-party company-profile data indicate that the group is engaged in the manufacture and supply of food and beverage products, and that it is export-oriented. It also appears the group has attracted attention from trade-media and export-news outlets for its processed food business.

== Business units and sister concerns ==
- Sajeeb Corporation
- Sajeeb Homes Limited
- Sajeeb Foods and Beverage Limited
- Hashem Foods Limited
- Hashem Rice Mills Limited
- Hashem Flour Mills Limited
- Hashem Agro Processing Limited
- Savvy Foods Limited
- MARS International Limited
- Takaful Islami Insurance Limited
