= Bengal Group of Industries =

Bangladeshi conglomerate

- Formation: 1969
- Headquarters: Dhaka, Bangladesh
- Region served: Bangladesh
- Official language: Bengali
- Website: www.bengalgroup.com

Bengal Group (also known as Bengal group of Industries) is a Bangladeshi conglomerate. It was established in 1969. It includes Bengal Plastic the largest plastic manufacturer in Bangladesh. Morshed Alam, is the chairman of the Bengal Group of Industries. The Vice chairman of the group is Md Jashim Uddin, younger brother of Morshed Alam.

== History ==
Bengal Group of Industries was established in 1969 by Morshed Alam in rented factory in Old Dhaka.

In 2004, Jashim Uddin became the president of Bangladesh Plastic Goods Manufacturers and Exporters Association. In June, Bengal Group purchased Rahmania Biscuit and Bread Industries.

In March 2007, a fire started at the headquarters of the group in first floor of BSEC Bhaban in Karwan Bazar leaving four dead and 36 injured. The office of Dandy Dying also burned down on the eight floor.

In 2008, The Daily Star and DHL Express awarded Enterprise of the Year 2007 to Bengal Plastic.

Morshed Alam was elected chairman of Mercantile Bank in 2011.

In February 2015, Bengal Plastic announced a 500 million expansion plan. It raised 500 million taka through Commercial papers for Bengal Plastic. Bengal Plastics manufactures products for Mainetti Group.

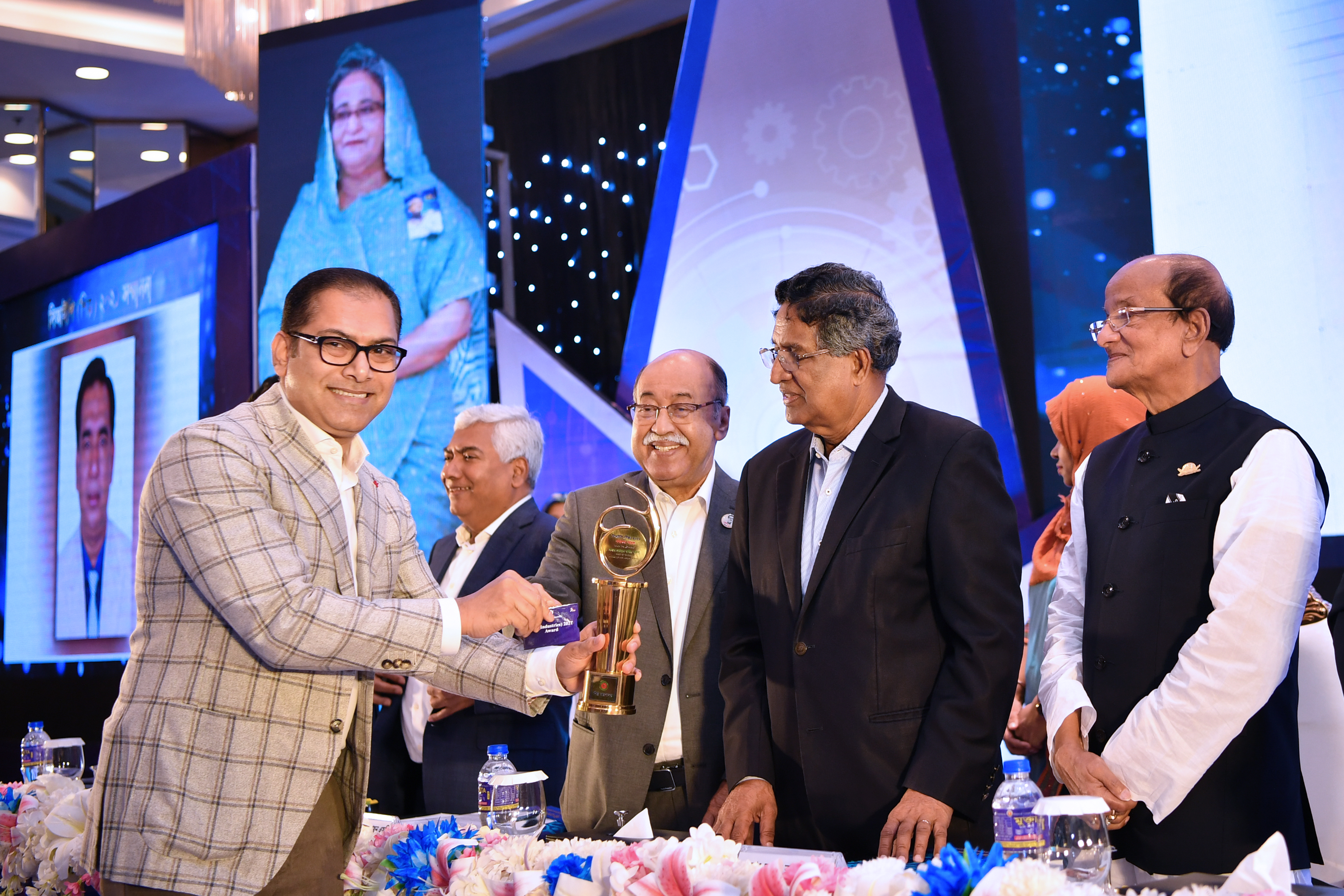
Humayun Kabir Bablu, Director, Bengal Group of Industries, receiving the CIP award-2021

In September 2017, Bengal Group signed an agreement to receive a loan from International Finance Corporation and FMO (Netherlands) to build a luxury hotel, Swissôtel Dhaka, in Dhaka. The loan will be arranged by Mutual Trust Bank Limited. Bengal Group requested permission to open a bank. Bengal Group signed an agreement Dhaka Power Distribution Company Limited to build rooftop power plants and sell the electricity to Dhaka Power Distribution Company for 9.8 taka per unit. Bengal Group would own and operate the solar cells built on the buildings of Bangladesh Institute of Bank Management, Department of Fisheries, Directorate Of Secondary & Higher Education, Shaheed Suhrawardi Indoor Stadium, Shilpakala Academy, and Uttara Haji Camp.

In February 2020, Bangladesh Bank approved the request for Bengal Bank Limited with a paid up capital of 5 billion taka.

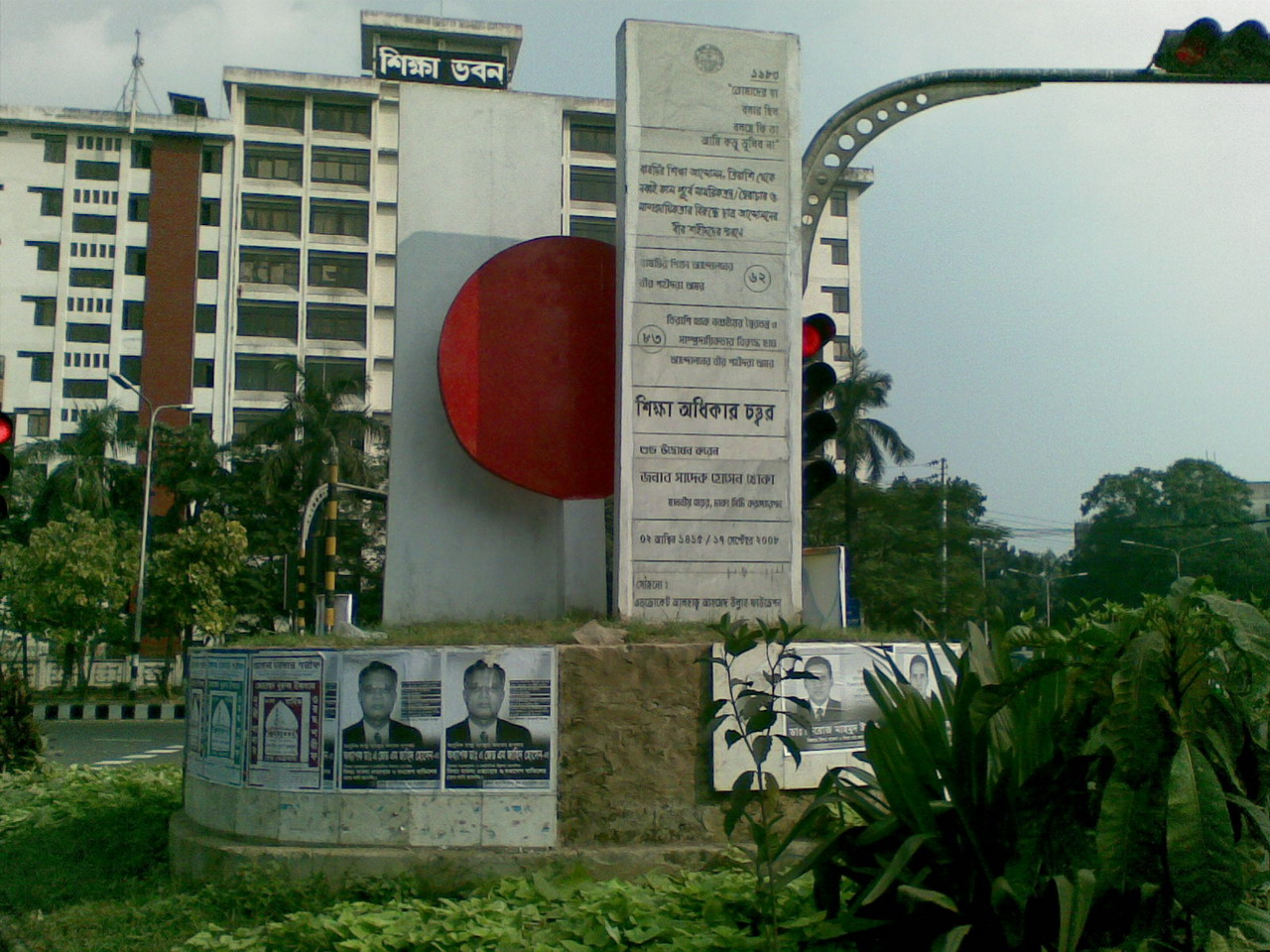
Shikha Bhaban (Directorate Of Secondary & Higher Education), one of the government buildings where Bengal is setting up a solar plant on the roof.

Bengal Cement signed an agreement to supply cement for the Dhaka Elevated Expressway in 2022. It flew dealers of Bengal Plastic on a trip to Nepal. Bengal Plastic was awarded gold in export trophies for 13 years in a row. The 24 outlet of Happy Mart opened in October in Mohammadpur.

== List of business and concerns ==
- Bengal Plastic Limited
- Bengal Polymer Wares Limited
- Bengal Windsor Thermoplastics Limited
- Bengal Adhesive and Chemical Products Limited
- Bengal Melamine Limited
- Bengal Corrugated Carton Industries Limited
- Hamilton Metal Corporation Limited
- Happy Mart (Bengal Retails Limited)
- Bengal Plastic Pipes Limited
- Bengal Cement Limited
- Bengal Poly & Paper Sack Limited
- Bengal FlexiPac Limited
- Romania Food and Beverage Limited
- Lexus Biscuit Limited
- Designer Fashion Limited
- Bengal Bank Limited
- Bengal Feed & Fisheries Limited
- Euphoria Apparels Limited
- Designer Washing & Dyeing Limited
- RTV
- Look@Me
- Future Infrastructure Limited
- Bengal Concept and Holdings Limited
- Linnex (Bangladesh) Industries Limited
- Linnex Electronics Bangladesh Limited
- Bengal LPG Limited
- Bengal Renewable Energy Limited
- Power Utility Company Limited
- AJ Oversees Company Limited
- Bengal Hotels and Resorts
