= Confidence Group =

Bangladeshi Company

- Type: Private (except Cement)
- Industry: Construction, Manufacturing Engineering
- Founded: 1991; 35 years ago
- Headquarters: Dhaka, Bangladesh
- Revenue: US$ 100 million BDT 7.5 billion In fiscal year 2010-2011
- Website: confidencegroup.com.bd

Confidence Group of Companies Limited (also referred to as Confidence Group) is a Bangladeshi company, involved in manufacturing mid-tech manufacturing engineering products. The conglomerate commenced its operation in 1991 with cement manufacture, and is involved with power generation and the manufacture of Spun Pre-stressed Concrete (SPC) poles. As of 2017, the conglomerate claims to consist of 8 operational business entities.

Rezaul Karim is the Chairman of Confidence Group. Imran Karim is the vice-chairman of Confidence Group.

== History ==
Confidence Group was established in 1991 with the founding of Confidence Cement Limited by Kazi Shahidul Islam, Khurshid Anwar, Rezaul Karim, and Rupam Kishore Barua. Confidence Cement is listed on the Dhaka Stock Exchange.

The company was established Confidence Power in 2000. In 2002, Confidence Group established a partnership with Asian Paints to form Asian Paints Bangladesh Limited (APBL).

Confidence Group signed an agreement with Bangladesh Power Development Board in 2011 to build an oil based powerplant in Chittagong in partnership with Rurelec PLC Limited and Energypac Power Generation Limited.

During the COVID-19 pandemic in Bangladesh, Bangladesh Independent Power Producers Association and Confidence Group distributed 2000 protective clothing to Bangladesh Police, Bangabandhu Sheikh Mujib Medical University, Kuwait Bangladesh Friendship Government Hospital, and Bangladesh Fire Service and Civil Defence. It donated 2 million BDT worth of testing kits in partnership with Shakib Al Hasan Foundation. Confidence Group received permission to build a 660 MW natural gas powerplant in Chittagong. Confidence Infrastructure Limited established a geotextile plant in Narayanganj District in June 2022. Former chairman of Confidence Group, Shamsul Alam, died in December 2022 from cancer.

In February 2023, Confidence Group signed a banking agreement with BRAC Bank Limited. Confidence Cement issued preference share worth 1.5 billion BDT.

== Subsidiaries ==
- Confidence Cement Limited
- Confidence Ready Mix
- Confidence Infrastructure Limited
- Confidence Steel Export Limited
- Kirtonkhola Tower Bangladesh Limited
- Confidence Batteries Limited
- Digicon Telecommunication Limited
- MIME
- Confidence Power Holdings Limited
- Confidence Power Bogura Limited
- Confidence Power Bogura Unit 2 Limited
- Confidence Power Rangpur Limited
- Zodiac Power Chittagong Limited
- Confidence Oil And Shipping Limited
- Asian Paints Bangladesh Limited
