= Habib Group =

Bangladeshi conglomerate

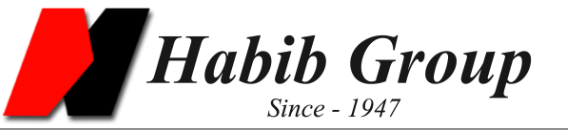
- Type: Private
- Industry: Conglomerate
- Founded: Chittagong, Bangladesh (1947)
- Headquarters: Chittagong, Bangladesh
- Key people: Yakub Ali (Chairman); Yasin Ali (Managing Director)
- Products: Apparel, Aviation, Cement, Energy, Paper, Real Estate, Ship breaking, Spinning, Steel, Textile
- Revenue: ▲US$500 million
- Number of employees: 20,000
- Website: habibgroupbd.com

The Habib Group is a Bangladeshi industrial conglomerate. Founded in Chittagong in 1947, it employs over 20,000 people and has interests in textiles, aviation, cement, steel, real estate, insurance and banking. It is the parent company of Regent Airways, a Bangladeshi private airline, and Regent Power Limited, a power generating company.

== History ==
Habib Group was established in 1947 by Habib Ullah Mia as Habib Trading, a consumer goods trading company. It was inherited by his three sons, Mahbub Ali, Yakub Ali, and Yasin Ali, in 1981 who expanded the business in other areas such as garments.

In 2009, Habib Group sponsored the Port City League Twenty20 championship in Chittagong. Regent Power Limited launched a 24 megawatt powerplant in Sitakunda Upazila in May.

In 2010, Habib Group launched Regent Airways. Mashruf Habib was the managing director of Regent Airways and Imran Asif was the chief executive officer. Salman Habib was the deputy managing director. Its first route was Dhaka to Chittagong and it started with two De Havilland Canada Dash 8. Habib Group had a turnover of 20 billion BDT a year.

The Daily Star-DHL awarded Habib Group the Enterprise of the Year award in 2014. The International Finance Corporation invested 20.2 million USD in Regent Energy & Power Limited in April to build a powerplant in Ghorashal. In November, Regent Group announced a 8 billion BDT expansion plan through the purchase of five aircraft for international routes.

Regent Textiles announced plans to build two new factories at an investment of 1.79 billion BDT in November 2015. Habib Group had 21 thousand employees.

In June 2017, Regent Airways announced plans to expand destinations in the Middle East and the purchase of three Boeing 737.

Regent Airways was financially hit during the COVID-19 pandemic in Bangladesh along with other airlines in 2020 after travel was restricted and flights were forced to cancel. It cancelled the lease of two Boeing 737 to save costs. The airline had 1.89 billion due to Civil Aviation Authority of Bangladesh.

In May, textile workers of Regent Textile Mills Limited protested in Chittagong demanding their unpaid wages. The workers went on an hunger strike demanding eights months of unpaid wages following their layoff. In July, the headquarters of Habib Group were vandalized. In September 2022, Chattogram Financial Debt Court ordered the seizure of land owned by Habib Steel in a .9 billion BDT loan default case filed by Eastern Bank Limited. A travel ban was imposed on five directors of the group.

In January 2023, the government of Bangladesh confiscated bank accounts of Regent Airways due to unpaid dues.

By April 2023, the headquarters of Habib Group appeared deserted and 31 subsidiaries of the group had closed down or were on the verge of closing down. Chattogram Magistrate Magistrate issued arrest warrants against five directors of the group including chairman Yakub Ali, directors, Mashruf Habib, Salman Habib, Tanvir Habib, and Yasin Ali in August 2022 in a dishonoured cheque case filed by IDLC Finance Limited. The group defaulted on 40 billion BDT worth of loans from 30 different financial institutions. The directors were believed to have fled from Bangladesh. The group had received numerous unsecured loans including a 3.6 billion loan from Dhaka Bank whose director was related to a director of Habib Group.

== Subsidiaries ==
- Habib Steel
- Chittagong Steel Enterprise
- MTS Rerolling Mills
- Regent Energy and Power
- Diamond Cement
- Anwara Paper Mills
- Anwara Fashion
- Ali Fashion
- Legacy Fashion
- Regent Spinning Mills
- Regent Weaving
- Regent Fabrics
- Hela Clothing
- Valiant Fashion
- Symes Superior
- ANZ Properties
- HG Aviation
- Regent Airways
- Ocean Merit
- Fortune Navigation
- Southern Medical College and Hospital
