= Alim Industries Limited =

Bangladesh's largest agricultural machinery manufacturer

- Native name: আলীম ইন্ডাষ্ট্রিজ লিমিটেড
- Industry: Agriculture
- Founded: 1990
- Founder: M.A. Alim Chowdhury
- Headquarters: BSCIC, Industrial Estate, Gutatikor, Sylhet-3100, Bangladesh., Sylhet, Bangladesh
- Key people: Alimus Sadat Chowdhury (Chairman); Alimul Ahsan Chowdhury (Managing Director); Alimus Shahan Chowdhury (Director); Lutfa Alim Chowdhury (Director)
- Products: Agricultural machinery
- Total assets: BDT 20 Crore (2020)
- Number of employees: 120 (2020)
- Website: alim.com.bd

Alim Industries Limited (Bengali: আলীম ইন্ডাষ্ট্রিজ লিমিটেড) is an agricultural machinery manufacturer based in Sylhet, Bangladesh.

== History ==
Founded in 1990, it is both the largest and oldest agricultural equipment maker in the country. Having initially only associated with the tea processing industry in Sylhet, it later expanded to include the manufacture of general farming machinery, specialising in tillers, seeders and power threshers among others. At present, it exports its products throughout Bangladesh as well as delivering services internationally.

In 2021, free equipment from Alim was distributed by the local upazila government to 64 farmers in the Nilphamari District of Rangpur Division.

In 2022 company was cited by Bangladesh agriculture minister Dr Mohammad Abdur Razzaque as a successful local manufacturer of agricultural machinery, counterbalancing the import of machines from abroad. The current owner received the "Agriculturally Important Person" award from the government in 2022, in recognition of its development of power tillers. Alim has received assistance from the U.S.-supported Cereal Systems Initiative for South Asia to help provide locally produced machines to support agriculture in the area of Cox's Bazar affected by Rohynga migration.
