= T K Group of Industries =

Bangladeshi conglomerates

T. K. Group of Industries
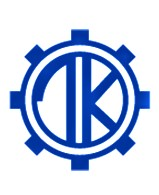
- Official logo
- Company type: Private
- Industry: Conglomerate
- Founded: 1972; 54 years ago
- Founder: Late. Mohammed Abu Tayab; Mohammed Abul Kalam
- Headquarters: Chittagong, Bangladesh
- Key people: Mrs. Laila Bilkis - Chairman; Mohammed Abul Kalam - Managing Director
- Products: Consumers Product; Cooking oil & Fats; Steel; Printing & Packaging; Cardboard; Paper; Textile; Tea; Mineral Water; Shipbuilding; Trading; Shares and Securities
- Brands: PUSTI; HILSA; RANNA; MAF-SHOES; PREMIER CEMENT; OCTODI INDUSTRIES; SAMUDA CHEMICALS; SUPER BOARD; TRADEVISOR LIMITED
- Revenue: ▲৳25800 crore (US$2.1 billion) (2021)
- Number of employees: 55,000+ (as of 2025)
- Website: tkgroupbd.com

The T K Group of Industries is a Bangladeshi industrial Conglomerate known for its vegetable oil business. It also has interests in steel, shipbuilding, pulp and paper, plastics, cement, and textiles. The conglomerate is headquartered in Chittagong. The group is one of the top VAT payers in the country.

== History ==
T. K. Group of Industries was established in 1972 as a trading company by two brothers, Mohammed Abu Tayab, and Mohammad Abul Kalam. The brothers started the business with a two thousand taka grant from their father. It is the largest producer of edible oil products in the country. The annual turnover of the group is over US$ 5 billion.

== Enterprises ==
T.K group has around 20 major concerns:

Edible oil

- Bay Fishing Corporation Ltd.
- Shabnam Vegetable Oil Industries Ltd.
- Super Oil Refinery Ltd

=== Food ===
- Pusti
  - Pusti Fortified Soyabean Oil
  - Pusti Mustard Oil
  - Pusti Atta
  - Pusti Moyda
  - Pusti Suji
  - Pusti Drinking Water

Steel

- Karnafully (Galv) Mills Ltd.
- Karnafully Steel Mills Ltd.

Board

- Super Board Mills Limited
- Super Formica and Lamination Limited
- T. K. Chemical Complex Ltd.

Paper

- T. K. Paper Products Ltd.
- Progressive Containers Ltd.

Packaging & containers

- Samuda Containers Ltd.
- T. K. Gas and Gas Cylinder Ltd.

Tea

- Baramasia Tea Estate
- Elahinoor Tea Estate
- Rangapani Tea Estate

Textile

- Chin Hung Fibres Ltd.

Ship building

- T. K. Shipyard Limited

Trading & food

- T.K Consumer Products limited-has two admiring brands PUSTI and FAMILY.

Shares & securities

- T.K. Shares & Securities Ltd.

Construction

- Tradevisor Limited

Vehicle

- MAF Motors

== Associates enterprises ==
T.K Group of Industries has over 15 major associates business sectors:

- Samuda Chemical Complex Limited
- Super Knitting & Dying Mills Limited
- Super Thread Limited
- Super Synthetic Limited
- Mohammadi Trading Co. Limited
- Bangladesh Timber & Plywood Industries Limited
- MAF News Print Mills Limited
- MAF Shoes Limited
- Tradevisor Limited
- Modern Hatchery Limited
- Modern Power Co. Limited
- Modern Fibers Industries Limited
- Modern Polly Industries Limited
- Masud & Brothers
- Rubi Food Products Limited
- Uni-Trade
- Premier Cement Mills Limited
- Asia Insurance Limited
- Riff Leather Limited
- M A Tayab Limited
- MAF Motors

== Achievements ==
T.K Group's brands have secured the heart of the people of Bangladesh for a few decades. This group has been awarded many awards nationally and internationally since its journey began. It has been awarded many times as "Standard Chartered Trade Awards", "Best Brand Award" for the contribution to the growth of the country's export and import market.

== See also ==
- List of companies of Bangladesh
