= BSRM =

Bangladeshi steel manufacturing company

BSRM Steels Limited
- Type: Public
- Traded as: DSE: BSRMSTEEL; CSE: BSRMSTEEL
- Industry: Steel engineering
- Genre: Steel; Iron
- Founded: 1952; 74 years ago
- Headquarters: Sadarghat Road, Chittagong, Bangladesh
- Area served: Worldwide
- Key people: Alihussain Akberali (Chairman) Aameir Alihussain (Managing Director) Zohair Taherali (Director)
- Products: Steel, long steel products, structural steel, wire products, steel casing pipes, household goods
- Revenue: ▲ ৳8,270.6 Crore (2023-2024)
- Net income: ▲৳379.657 Crore (2023-2024)
- Total assets: ▲ ৳9,716.85 Crore (2023-2024)
- Owner: Africawala family
- Subsidiaries: BSRM (Hong Kong)
- Website: bsrm.com

The Bangladesh Steel Re-Rolling Mills, Tradename: BSRM Steels Limited, commonly known as BSRM, is a Bangladeshi steel manufacturing company based in Chittagong. It is the largest construction steel manufacturer company in Bangladesh.

== History ==
In 1952, five businessmen—Akberali Africawala, Alibhai Africawala, Taherali Africawala, Abdul Hussain Africawala, and Rajabali Africawala—established the first BSRM steel re-rolling mill in Nasirabad, Chittagong, then part of East Bengal. The family belong to the Dawoodi Bohra community. It started its journey with four manual rolling mills. In 1970 the manual rolling mills were replaced with the state-of-the-art Italian built rolling mill.

In 1996, the company installed and commissioned their billet casting plant under the name "Meghna Engineering Works Limited".

In July 2002, BSRM Group incorporated a new company, BSRM Steels Ltd, to fund and operate a turnkey re-rolling mill from Italian supplier Danieli. Construction of the plant began in 2005 on 11 acres just off the Dhaka-Chittaong Highway at Latifpur in Fouzderhat, Chittagong. It was completed at a cost of 3.7 billion Bangladeshi taka (equivalent to $54 million in 2008). The facility began commercial operation in April 2008 with an annual production capacity of 375,000 metric tons. On 18 January 2009, BSRM Steels Ltd was listed on the Dhaka Stock Exchange and Chittagong Stock Exchange. As of 2019, holding company BSRM Ltd retained about 45% of the shares in BSRM Steels Ltd.

BSRM has a subsidiary in Hong Kong named BSRM (Hong Kong) Limited.

== Controversy ==
In May 2019, Bangladesh National Board of Revenue (NBR) alleged that the company has drawn over USD 13 million from the government falsely claiming locally sold steel products as export goods which violates the duty drawbacks facilities that is only meant for material export.

In an investigation led by a team from the VAT intelligence unit of the NBR, it was found that two institutions of BSRM dodged VAT amounting to BDT 6.62 crore from July 2016 to June 2019. BSRM later paid the VAT, including interest, to the NBR in December 2021.

Between 2017 and 2018, BSRM was fined ৳5.2 millions by Department of Environment for destroying 1,05,000 square feet of hills in Mirsharai Upazila to make way for a power plant named Chittagong Power Company Limited.

In May 2021, locals in Mirsharai Upazila, Chattogram, protested falling groundwater levels, which they blamed on BSRM Steels drawing water via deep tube wells. BSRM denied causing the water shortage, citing that deep wells are common for industries and households in the area.

== See also ==
- GPH Ispat
