= KDS Group =

Conglomerate

- Type: Private company
- Industry: Conglomerate
- Founded: 1983; 43 years ago
- Founder: Khalilur Rahman
- Headquarters: 255 Nasirabad I/A Baizid Bostami Road, Chittagong, Bangladesh
- Key people: Khalilur Rahman (Chairman)
- Products: Garments, textile, trims and packaging, steel, logistic and shipping
- Revenue: ▲US$150 million (2012)
- Number of employees: 25000
- Website: www.kdsgroup.net

KDS Group is a business and industrial conglomerates of Bangladesh, which is based in Chittagong but with extensive operations in Dhaka as well. It has also established offices and agencies in India, Hong Kong and is expanding into Europe and North America.

== History ==
The group was founded in 1983, through the establishment of one of the first garments industries of Bangladesh. The founder of the group was Khalilur Rahman.

KDS Textiles was established in 2000. The same year, KDS Steel established KYCR Coil Industries Limited. In 2001, the Cold Rolling Mills Complex was established by KDS group.

In March 2009, KDS Logistics began operations of its Inland Container Depot near Chittagong Port. The group had invested three billion BDT to establish the depot. The group was awarded the national export trophy in 2010 by Prime Minister Sheikh Hasina.

KDS Accessories established a new factory in Gazipur District in September 2016.

In February 2017, Khalilur Rahman, chairman of KDS Group, was elected chairman of AIBL Capital Market Services Limited, a subsidiary of Al-Arafah Islami Bank. It announced plans to invest US$10 million in the Bangabandhu Hi-Tech City.

The Department of Environment implicated KDS Textile Mills Limited of polluting Halda River in a report of the agency. In November 2019, KDS Accessories approved 15 per cent dividend for stock holders.

In August, the managing director of the group, Salim Rahman, was made the chairman of Al-Arafah Islami Bank.

KDS Accessories Limited profit increased 6 per cent in 2022 from 2021. The rising cost of raw materials had reduced the bottom line for the company.

== Businesses ==
- KDS Textiles
- KDS Garment Industries Limited
- KDS Hi-Tec Garments BD Limited
- KDS Apparels Limited
- KDS Fashion Limited
- HN Garments Limited
- KDS Accessories
- KYCR Coil Industries Limited
- KDS Steel
- KY Steel Mills Limited
- KDS Logistics
- KDS Properties Limited
- National Bank Limited (founding shareholder)
- Al-Arafah Islami Bank Limited (founding shareholder)
- Northern insurance Limited
- Pragati Insurance Limited
- Skys Securities Limited
- KDS IDR Limited
