= Mohammad Mahfuzul Islam =

Professor Dr. Muhammad Mahfuzul Islam

2nd Vice-Chancellor

Gazipur Digital University
- In office 20 November 2022 – 14 September 2024
- Preceded by: Munaz Ahmed Noor
- Succeeded by: Mohammad Abu Yusuf

Vice-Chancellor

Canadian University of Bangladesh
- In office 2018–2021
- Succeeded by: H. M. Jahirul Haque

Personal details
- Born: 1973 (age 52–53) Munshinangla,Melandaha Upazila,Jamalpur, Bangladesh
- Education: Melandah Umir Uddin Pilot High School (SSC) * Notre Dame College, Dhaka (HSC) * Bangladesh University of Engineering and Technology * Monash University, Australia
- Occupation: Professor, University Administrator

Mohammad Mahfuzul Islam is a Bangladeshi academic and vice-chancellor of Bangabandhu Sheikh Mujibur Rahman Digital University. He is the former vice-chancellor of the Canadian University of Bangladesh. He is a former President of the Bangladesh Computer Society. He is a Computer Science and Engineering professor at Bangladesh University of Engineering and Technology.

== Early life ==
He was born in 1973 in Jamalpur District. He completed his secondary education at Melandah Umir Uddin Pilot High School and higher secondary education at Notre Dame College. Then, he obtained his bachelor's and master's degrees from the Department of Computer Science and Engineering at Bangladesh University of Engineering and Technology. Later, he earned a PhD degree from Monash University in Australia.

== Career ==
Islam taught at the Department of Computer Science and Engineering at Bangladesh University of Engineering and Technology. He was the Provost of Shahid Smriti Hall. He served as the President of Bangladesh Computer Society. He was a director of Dhaka Electric Supply Company Limited.

In December 2017, Islam was appointed vice-chancellor of the Canadian University of Bangladesh. Dr Nazrul Islam joined as pro-vice-chancellor of the Canadian University of Bangladesh under Mohammad Mahfuzul Islam.

Islam was appointed vice-chancellor of Bangabandhu Sheikh Mujibur Rahman Digital University on 20 November 2022. He paid tribute to former President Sheikh Mujibur Rahman at his former residence in Dhanmondi, Bangabandhu Memorial Museum.
