= Melandah Umir Uddin Pilot High School =

MPO-listed Pilot High School in Bangladesh

- মেলান্দহ উমির উদ্দিন পাইলট উচ্চ বিদ্যালয়
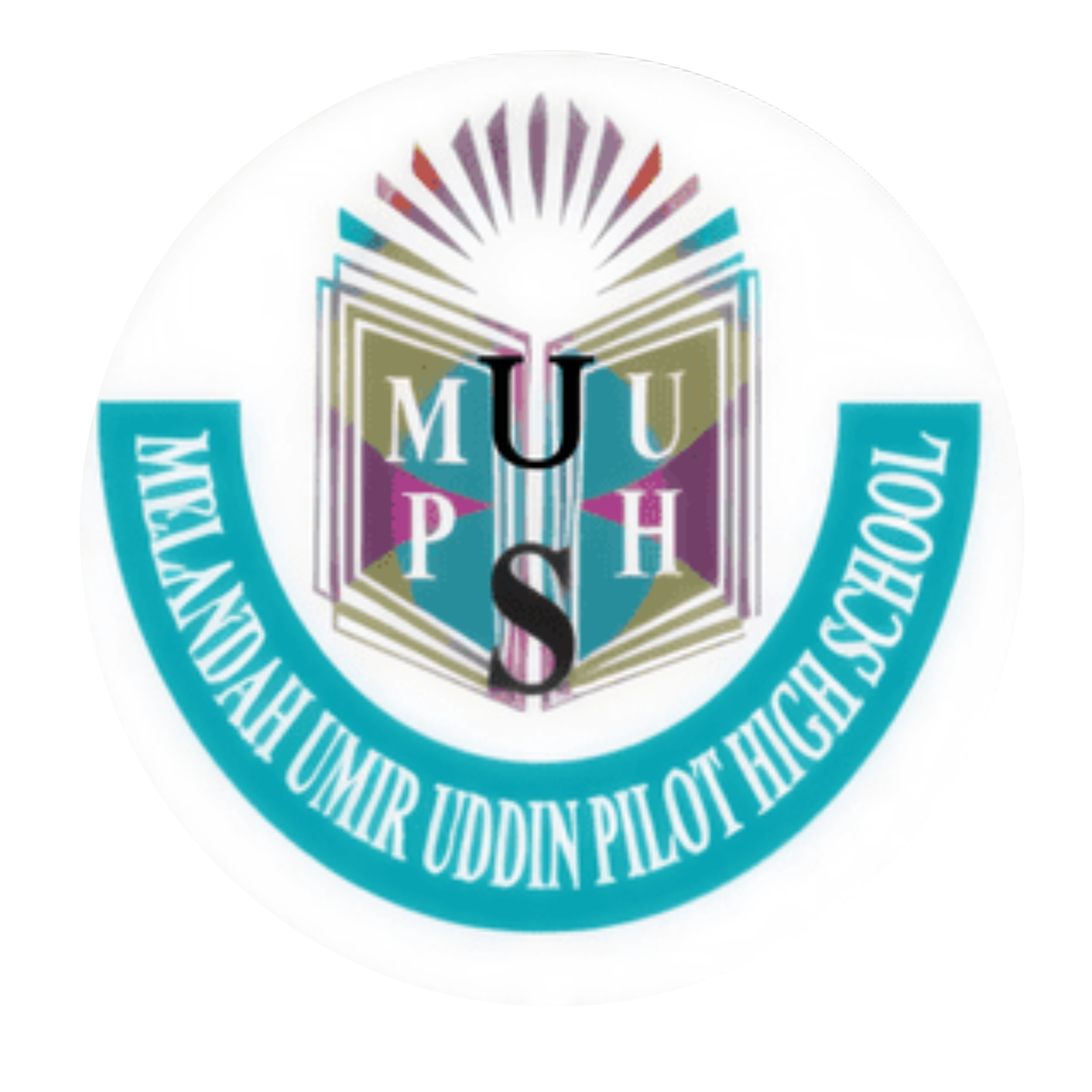

Location
- Pasha Market Road, High School Road; Melandah Sadar, Jamalpur., 2010; Bangladesh; 24.9778279°N 89.8287272°E

Information
- Other name: MUUPHS
- Motto: Education for acquiring knowledge.
- Established: 1937; 89 years ago
- School board: Mymensingh Education Board; Bangladesh Technical Education Board
- School code: EIIN 110091
- Headmaster: Md. Mohan Talukdar
- Gender: Co-educational
- Age range: 10-16 (approximately)
- Enrollment: 2000+
- Classes: 6 - 10
- Language: Bengali
- Campus size: 8.94 acres
- Colors: White Shirt; White Pant
- Sports: Cricket, Football, Volleyball
- Nickname: MUUPHS
- Website: www.muuphs.edu.bd

Melandah Umir Uddin Pilot High School (MUUPHS) is an MPO-listed pilot high school in Jamalpur District and one of the oldest schools in Bangladesh.

== History ==
Melandah Umir Uddin Pilot High School was established in 1937 during the British colonial rule to expand literacy and formal education among the local people of Melandaha and surrounding areas. It operates under the academic jurisdiction of the Board of Intermediate and Secondary Education, Mymensingh, and is recognized as one of the leading educational institutions of Melandaha Upazila.

The institution routinely hosts cultural activities, annual sports competitions, secondary candidate farewell milad ceremonies, merit award receptions, scout training camps, and the traditional regional Mahatabu Jalsa. , and the National Education Week awards. The school maintains its official profile portal hosted by the Dhaka Education Board.

== Infrastructure ==
This school, located in the heart of Melandah Sadar, features a functional campus layout on 8.94 acres of land. The infrastructure consists of an ancient single-story main building and a modern three-story academic building to accommodate its student body, offering a total floor space of 16,556 square feet and 28 classrooms. Additionally, the campus includes a spacious 2.50-acre playground for the students.

== Student uniform ==
The prescribed uniform for students at the school is as follows:

1. White shirt

2. White pants

3. School badge with monogram

== Notable alumni ==
- Mohammad Mahfuzul Islam, academic, professor, and computer scientist, who served as a faculty member at BUET and vice-chancellor of Bangabandhu Sheikh Mujibur Rahman Digital University.

== See also ==
- Melandaha Upazila
- Jamalpur District
- Munshinangla
- List of schools in Bangladesh
- Education in Bangladesh
