= The Essential Tagore =

English-language compilation of Rabindranath Tagore's works

- The cover image of the Essential Tagore (Harvard edition).
- Author: Rabindranath Tagore
- Language: English
- Publisher: Harvard University Press
- Publication date: 2011
- Publication place: United States and India
- Media type: Print (Hardcover)
- Pages: 819
- ISBN: 978-0-674-05790-6
- OCLC: 676725370

The Essential Tagore is the largest collection of Rabindranath Tagore's works available in English. It was published by Harvard University Press in the United States and Visva-Bharati University in India to mark the 150th anniversary of Tagore's birth. Fakrul Alam and Radha Chakrabarthy edited the anthology. Among the notable contributors who translated Tagore's works for this anthology are Amitav Ghosh, Amit Chaudhuri, Sunetra Gupta, Syed Manzoorul Islam, and Kaiser Haq. Martha Nussbaum, a philosopher, writer and critic proposed the book as the 'Book of the Year' in the New Statesman published on 21 November 2011.

The anthology is around eight hundred pages long, divided into ten sections, each devoted to a different facet of Tagore's achievement. In this anthology, the editors endeavored to represent his extraordinary achievements in ten genres: poetry, songs, autobiographical works, letters, travel writings, prose, novels, short stories, humorous pieces, and plays. Most of the translations were done in modern contemporary English. Besides the new translations, it includes a sampling of works originally composed in English, Tagore's translations of his own works.

== Critical reception ==
"A hundred years from now
Who could you be
Reading my poems curiously
A hundred years from now!
How can I transit to you who are so far away
A bit of joy I feel this day
At this new spring dawn."
— A Hundred Years from Now, The Essential Tagore P. 243

Initial reviews for the Essential Tagore were almost all positive. Immediately after the publication, it received positive reviews worldwide. Barry Hill in the Australian welcomed the publication as "a wonderful job" and "almost all gold". Praising the editors and translators, Amartya Sen exclaimed that though the excellence of Tagore's work is difficult to preserve in translation, they did a splendid job of producing a beautiful volume of selections from Tagore's vast body of writings. He also praised Amit Chaudhuri for his enjoyable and remarkably far-reaching foreword. In Times Literary Supplement Seamus Perry wrote that the anthology testifies to Tagore's capability in many diverse modes, and quite distinct aspects of his genius. In the magazine Bookforum, Aravind Adiga opined that the anthology reintroduced a great writer to the world. Amardeep Singh of Open Letters Monthly thought that the Essential Tagore "dwarfes(ed) all previous efforts" that were made to translate Tagore's work into English.

== Contents of the book ==
- List of Illustrations
- Foreword: Poetry as Polemic by Amit Chaudhuri
- Introduction

1. Autobiography

- Autobiographical
- From Reminiscences
- From Boyhood Days
- My School

2. Letters

- From Torn Leaves
- From Letter-Fragments
- To Mrinalini Devi
- To Jagadish Chandra Bose
- To Myron H. Phelps
- To William Rothenstein
- To Robert Bridges
- To James Drummonds Anderson
- To Lord Chelmsford
- To Charles Freer Andrews
- To Kanti Chandra Ghosh
- To Edward John Thompson
- To Kazi Nazrul Islam
- To Romain Rolland
- To Sir William Rothenstein
- To Mahatma Gandhi
- To Mahadev Desai
- To Sufia Kamal
- To Pulinbehari Sen
- To Victoria Ocampo
- To Revd. Foss Westcott

3. Prose

- From Self-Reliance and Other Essays
- Statecraft and Ethics
- The Components of Literature
- The Significance of Literature
- The Problem of Self
- Nationalism in the West
- The Nobel Prize Acceptance Speech
- From Thoughts from Rabindranath Tagore
- My Pictures
- Hindus and Muslims
- The Tenant Farmer
- Crisis in Civilization

4. Poems

- The Fountain's Awakening
- Enough, Enough!
- Life
- Undressed
- Breasts
- Kissing
- The Golden Boat
- The Two Birds
- I Won't Let You Go
- Unfathomable
- Voyage without End
- To Civilization
- My Little Plot of Land
- A Hundred Years from Now
- The Lord of Life
- Love Queries
- Krishnakali
- The Poet
- The Hero
- Big and Small
- Astronomy
- On the Day Thou Breakst Through This My Name
- More Life, My Lord
- Thy Rod of Justice
- The Day I Depart
- It Hasn't Rained in My Heart
- When Life Dries Up
- If the Day Ends
- This Stormy Night
- A Flight of Geese
- The Restless One
- Dawn and Dusk
- Free!
- Sunday
- Hymn to the Tree
- Woman Empowered
- Wind Instrument
- Letter Writing
- An Ordinary Woman
- Camellia
- The Twenty-Fifth of Baisakh
- I
- Africa
- I Saw in the Twilight
- Romantic
- The Night Train
- Waking Up in the Morning I See
- They Work
- On the Banks of Roop-Naran
- The Sun of the First Day
- Dark Nights of Sorrow
- On the Way to Creation

5. Songs

- Devotional Songs
- Patriotic Songs
- Love Songs
- Songs of Nature
- Miscellaneous Songs

6. Plays

- Roktokorobi
- The Kingdom of Cards

7. Stories

- The Return of Khoka Babu
- The Legacy
- Shubha
- Mahamaya
- The In-Between Woman
- Hungry Stone
- A Broken Nest
- The Wife's Letter
- The Final Word
- The Tale of a Muslim Woman

8. Novels

- From Gora
- From Connections
- From Farewell Song
- From Four Chapters

9. Humor

- Denge the Black Ant's Observations
- Aryans and Non-Aryans
- The Funeral
- Ordeal
- Testing the Student
- The Invention of Shoes
- From Out of Sync

10. Travel Writing

- The City of Bombay
- Crossing the Ocean
- Travel
- Stopford Brooke
- The English Village and the Clergy
- From Journey to Japan
- Letter to Pratima Devi
- From Letters from Russia
- From In Persia
- Chronology
- Notes
- Glossary
- Further Reading
- Acknowledgments
- Contributors
