= Mohammad Tamim =

Bangladeshi academic

Professor Dr. Mohammad Tamim
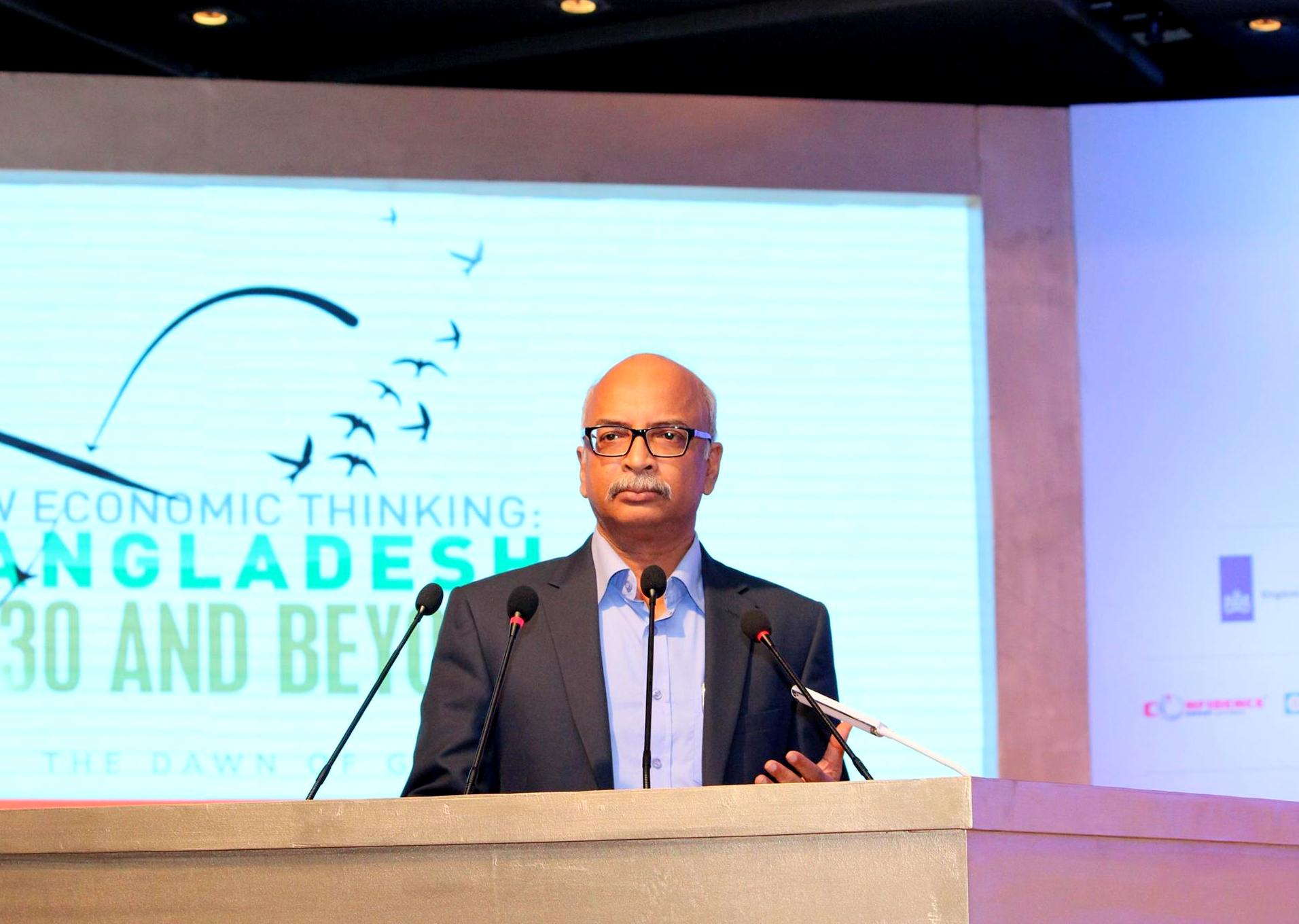
- Tamin in 2016

4th Vice-Chancellor of Independent University, Bangladesh
- In office 17 December 2024 – Present
- Preceded by: Tanweer Hasan

Special Assistant to the Chief Advisor
- In office 10 January 2008 – 6 January 2009

Personal details
- Education: BUET; IIT; University of Alberta

Mohammad Tamim is a Bangladeshi academic and Vice Chancellor of Independent University, Bangladesh.

== Early life ==
Tamim completed his undergraduate from Bangladesh University of Engineering and Technology. He did his graduate studies in mechanical engineering at the Indian Institute of Technology Madras. He did his PhD at the University of Alberta on Petroleum Engineering.

== Career ==
On 10 January 2008, he was appointed special assistant to the chief advisor of the caretaker government. He was placed in charge of the Ministry of Power, Energy and Mineral Resources. He was a founding chairman of Society of Petroleum Engineers, Bangladesh Section.

Tamim was a professor of Bangladesh University of Engineering and Technology. On 18 February 2019, he was appointed Pro-Vice Chancellor of BRAC University.

In August 2024, Tamim was included in an committee formed to investigated the economy of Bangladesh led by Dr Debapriya Bhattacharya.
