= Fakrul Alam =

Bangladeshi academic, writer, and translator

- ফকরুল আলম
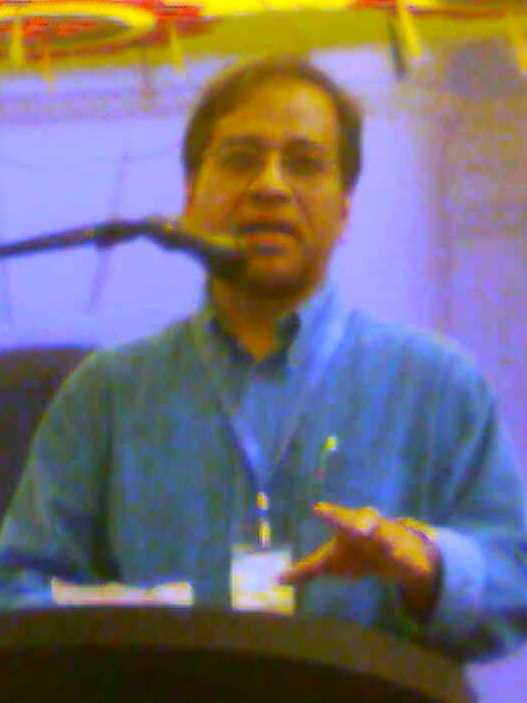
- Fakrul Alam at Bangla Academy, Dhaka (2013)
- Born: 20 July 1951 (age 75); Ukilpara, Feni District, East Bengal, Dominion of Pakistan
- Citizenship: Pakistan (1951–1971) Bangladesh (Since 1971)
- Education: St. Joseph Higher Secondary School University of Dhaka; University of British Columbia
- Occupations: Academic, writer, translator
- Writing career
- Language: Bengali, English
- Notable awards: Bangla Academy Literary Award (2013)

Fakrul Alam (born 20 July 1951) is a Bangladeshi academic, writer, and translator. He writes on literary matters and postcolonial issues and translated works of Jibanananda Das and Rabindranath Tagore into English. He is the recipient of Bangla Academy Literary Award (2012) in translation literature and SAARC Literary Award (2012). During the July Uprising in Bangladesh, he was criticized for his perceived support of Hasina Government's efforts to suppress the student movement.

== Early life and education ==
Fakrul Alam grew up in Ramkrishna Mission Road, Dhaka. He began his schooling at Little Jewels Kindergarten and later attended St. Joseph's School and spent his college days in Notre Dame College. He completed BA and MA in English at the University of Dhaka, earned a second master's degree from Simon Fraser University and achieved his PhD degree from the University of British Columbia, Vancouver. His PhD dissertation was on works of Daniel Defoe.

== Academic career ==
Fakrul Alam became a faculty member at the Department of English of the University of Dhaka after the liberation war of Bangladesh. As of today, he taught at several universities around the globe, including Clemson University, USA as a Fulbright Scholar, and Jadavpur University, India as a visiting associate professor. Besides academic responsibilities, he was also the Director of the Advanced Studies in the Humanities of the University of Dhaka from 1993 to 1996, and Adviser of the Dhaka University Central Library from 2002 to 2003. He is currently a member of the Education Policy Implementation Committee constituted by the Government of Bangladesh. He serves as an advisor at the Department of English of East West University.

== Works ==
Fakrul Alam's first book was Daniel Defoe: Colonial Propagandist. He writes in a vibrant style with logical argumentation on literary matters that range from colonial to post-colonial literature. For him, reading and writing are a living experience. He received widespread recognition as one of the best translators and foremost authorities of Jibanananda Das and Rabindranath Tagore. Appreciating Fakrul Alam's translation of Jibanananda Das, Syed Manzoorul Islam said "the sights and sounds of Bengal's landscape, its crowded botany and its constantly shifting lights and shadows find their way into Alam's translation". In 2011 he edited The Essential Tagore in collaboration with Radha Chakravarty for Visva-Bharati University, India and Harvard University Press, USA. Below is an excerpt of Fakrul Alam's translation of "Amar Shonar Bangla" (My Bengal of Gold) by Rabindranath Tagore from The Essential Tagore:

"O mother, when I lay myself down at your feet;
Bless me with the dust that they tread, for they will bejewel me.
O mother dear, what little I have I will lay at your feet,
How fulfilling to stop adorning myself with foreign purchases,
To know that even the rope you provide for a noose can be my adornment!" (331)

=== Publications ===
- The Unfinished Memoirs (translation of Sheikh Mujibur Rahman's unfinished autobiography; 2012)
- The Essential Tagore (2011)
- Rabindranath Tagore and National Identity Formation in Bangladesh: Essays and Reviews (2013)
- Imperial Entanglements and Literature in English (2007)
- Dictionary of Literary Biography: South Asian Writers in English (2006)
- Jibananada Das: Selected Poems, Translated with Introduction, Bibliography and Glossary (1999)
- Bharati Mukherjee, Twane's United States Authors Series (1995)
- Daniel Defoe: Colonial Propagandist (1989)
- The Ocean of Sorrow (2016)

== Criticism ==
During the final phase of the 2024 July Uprising in Bangladesh, on the night of 3 August, ousted Prime Minister Sheikh Hasina held a meeting at the Ganabhaban with vice-chancellors and faculty members from 24 public and private universities, as well as principals of 23 colleges.The meeting was reportedly aimed at exploring ways to persuade protesting students to withdraw their movement and to address the escalating situation. Fakhrul Alam was among the attendees. Following the fall of the Hasina government on 5 August, participating academics faced criticism from sections of the protesting students and teachers associated with the Anti-Discrimination Student Movement, who alleged that they had aligned themselves with power rather than supporting the Student's demands. Amid broader resentment toward senior academics whom protesters perceived as silent supporters of alleged enforced disappearances, extrajudicial killings, and other human rights violations under the Hasina government, Fakhrul Alam was criticized on social media. Some Gen-Z students used the phrase "0% contribution, 100% celebration" to describe what they perceived as his role during the political and economic struggles of the nation. The slogan later attracted wider public attention after academic Shamsad Mortuza published an article in The Daily Star commenting on the protesters' "socio-economic and religious backgrounds", remarks that subsequently drew criticism.
