= Shahnaz Gazi =

Bangladeshi diplomat

- শাহনাজ গাজী

Ambassador of Bangladesh to Romania
- Incumbent
- Assumed office 25 January 2025
- President: Mohammed Shahabuddin
- Prime Minister: Muhammad Yunus (as Chief Adviser)
- Preceded by: Md Daud Ali

Personal details
- Spouse: Shamsad Mortuza

Shahnaz Gazi is a Bangladeshi diplomat and the incumbent Ambassador of Bangladesh to Romania since January 2025. She is the former Bangladeshi Consul General in Kunming, China.

== Early life and education ==
Gazi studied English Literature at Jahangirnagar University in Savar, Dhaka, and earned both a Bachelor's and a Master's degree in English Literature. She earned her second Master's degree in Diplomatic Studies from the Diplomatic Academy of London (DAL) under the University of Westminster, London. She successfully completed the Advanced Course on Security Studies at the Asia Pacific Center for Security Studies (APCSS) in Honolulu, Hawaii, USA, in 2001. She also completed Young Diplomats' Training Programme in Ankara, Turkiye, in 1999, course on Environmental Politics at the University of Trieste, Italy, in 2004 and Training Course on Human Rights at Lund University in Sweden in 2005.

== Career ==
Gazi joined Bangladesh Foreign Service in 1998 as a career diplomat through 17th batch of Bangladesh Civil Service. She served as Assistant Secretary at the Americas and Pacific wing at the Ministry of Foreign Affairs before being posted to Bangladesh High Commission in London in 2002 where she served as Second and First Secretary till 2005. During 2005-2009, Gazi served as First Secretary and Counsellor at Bangladesh Embassy in Stockholm, Sweden. Gazi served as Director at Foreign Minister's Office at the Ministry of Foreign Affairs in Dhaka during 2009 to 2011. In May 2013, she was made the first Consul General of Bangladesh in Kunming, China. Earlier, from 2011 to 2013, she served as the Deputy Consul General of Bangladesh in Los Angeles.

Gazi was the deputy chief of the Bangladesh Embassy in Philippines in 2015 where she worked on recovering stolen money from the Bangladesh Bank heist. She was the acting High Commissioner of Bangladesh to Nigeria in 2017. She later served as Minister and Charge d' Affaires of the Bangladesh Embassy in Thailand from 2018-2021. She also served at Bangladesh Embassy in Türkiye in 2022.

Gazi was a Director General of the Ministry of Foreign Affairs during 2023-2024. She worked as Director General at the Foreign Service Academy and also as Director General (West Europe and EU) at the Foreign Ministry

In January 2025, Gazi was appointed the Ambassador of Bangladesh to Romania. The position is also serves as a non-resident ambassador of Bangladesh to Bulgaria, Moldova and North Macedonia.

== Personal life ==
Gazi is married to Dr. Shamsad Mortuza, a Professor of English at the University of Dhaka and at present the Vice Chancellor of the University of Liberal Arts Bangladesh. They have a daughter, Arshi Mortuza, who is a poet and teacher.
