= Rafiqul Islam (educationist) =

Bangladeshi educationist (1934–2021)

- রফিকুল ইসলাম
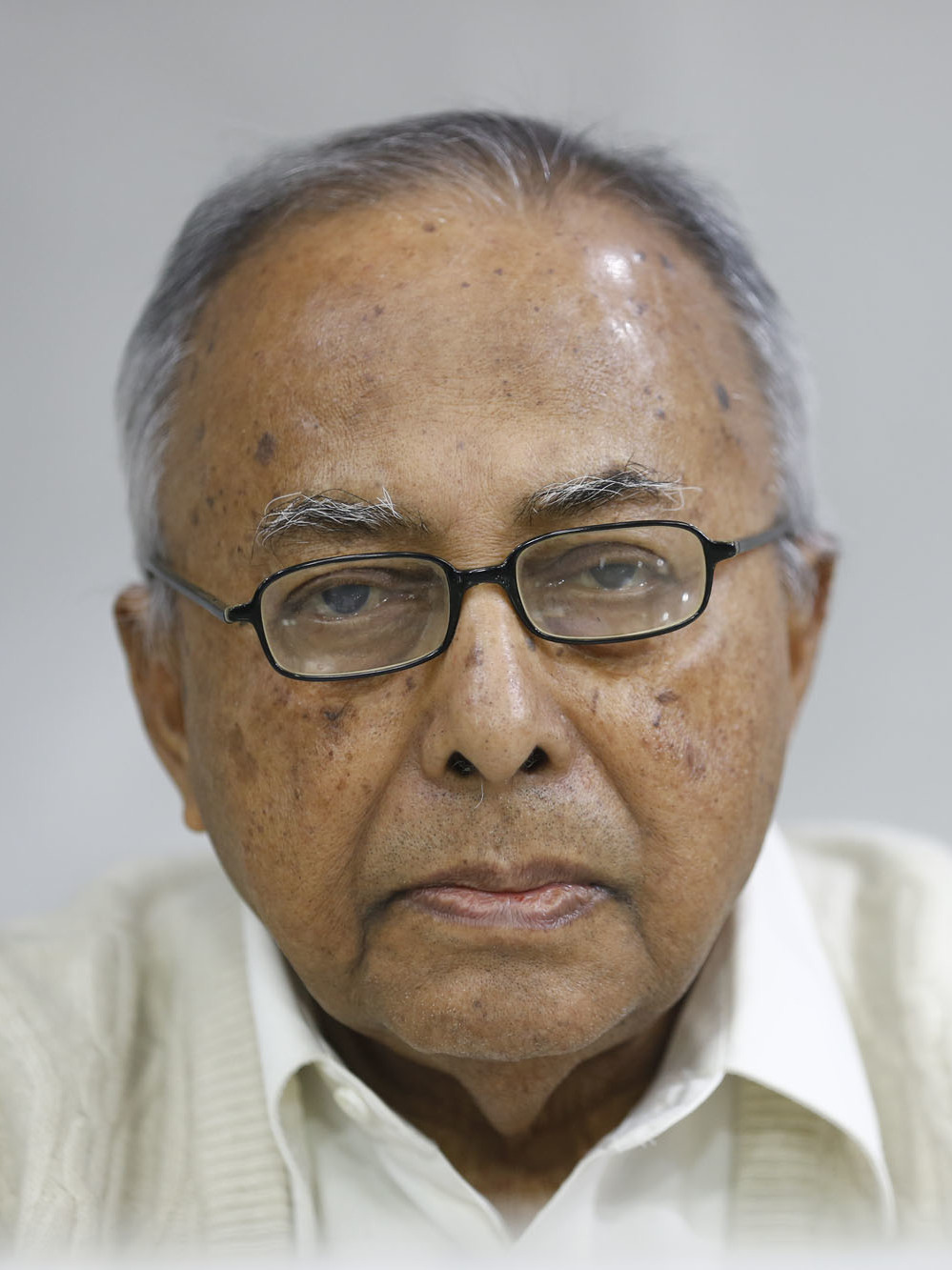
- Rafiq in 2019

President of Bangla Academy
- In office 1 June 2021 – 30 November 2021
- Preceded by: Anisuzzaman
- Succeeded by: Selina Hossain

Vice-Chancellor of University of Liberal Arts Bangladesh
- In office 2007–2011
- Preceded by: Kazi Shahid Ahmed
- Succeeded by: Imran Rahman

Director General of Bangla Academy
- In office 30 April 2001 – 31 December 2001
- Preceded by: Syed Anwar Husain
- Succeeded by: Abul Mansur Muhammad Abu Musa

Personal details
- Born: 1 January 1934 Matlab North, Chandpur, Bengal Presidency, British India
- Died: 30 November 2021 (aged 87) Dhaka, Bangladesh
- Education: University of Dhaka; Cornell University; University of Minnesota; University of Michigan; University of Hawaiʻi
- Occupation: Educationist, researcher, writer
- Known for: Nazrul research
- Awards: full list

Rafiqul Islam (1 January 1934 – 30 November 2021) was a Bangladeshi educationist, scholar, writer, linguist and cultural activist. He served at the Bangla Academy as a president (2021) and a director general (2001). He was inducted as a National Professor by the Government of Bangladesh in July 2018. He was a vice-chancellor (2007–2011), professor emeritus and adviser to the Centre for Bangla Studies of the University of Liberal Arts Bangladesh (ULAB). He served as the chairman of the Nazrul Institute Trustee Board. He was awarded Ekushey Padak in 2001 and Independence Day Award in 2012 by the Government of Bangladesh.

Islam's notable books include Nazrul Nirdeshika, Bhashtottya, An Introduction to Colloquial Bengali, Bangladesher Swadhinota Sangram, Bhasha Andolan O Shahid Minar, Dhakar Kotha, Bhasha Andolan o Muktijhuddher Shahitya, Swadhinotar Sangrame Dhaka Biswabidyalaya, and Dhaka Biswabidyalayar Ashi Bosor.

== Education and career ==
Islam completed his master's in Bengali language and literature from the University of Dhaka in 1956. He then joined the same university as a research scholar and lecturer. He received a Fulbright Scholarship to study linguistics in the United States in 1959. He attended Yale University. He obtained a master's degree from Cornell University in general linguistics and cultural anthropology in 1960. He joined the department of Bengali in the University of Dhaka as an assistant professor in 1961. He eventually served as a professor of the university at the Department Of Linguistics. Later, he served as the vice-chancellor of the University of Liberal Arts Bangladesh.

Islam wrote 30 books on the language, literature, history and culture of Bangladesh.

Islam was the director general of Bangla Academy from April–December 2001. He served as a chairman of the Nazrul Institute Trustee Board.

Islam died on 30 November 2021 at the Evercare Hospital Dhaka.

== Awards and honours ==
- Nazrul Academy Award, Churulia, West Bengal (1987)
- Nazrul Institute Award (1987)
- Bangla Academy Literary Award (1984)
- Ekushey Padak (2001)
- Independence Day Award (2012)
- Star Lifetime Award (2016)
- Bangla Academy Shommanona (2017)
- National Professor recognition (2018)
- International Mother Language Award (2021)
