= Bazlul Chowdhury =

Bangladeshi academic

Bazlul Mobin Chowdhury
- Mobin in 2009

1st Vice-Chancellor of Independent University, Bangladesh
- In office 1 January 1994 – 31 January 2011

Personal details
- Born: 16 March 1941 Sylhet, Bangladesh
- Died: 29 December 2010 (aged 69)
- Education: University of Dhaka; University of East Anglia; University of Aberdeen

Bazlul Mobin Chowdhury (16 March 1941 – 29 December 2010) was a Bangladeshi academic and the first Vice-Chancellor of the Independent University, Bangladesh. He played a pivotal role in establishing IUB as a leading educational institution in Bangladesh.

== Early life and education ==
Chowdhury was born on 16 March 1941 in Sylhet. He received his early education in Dhaka. He obtained his BA and MA degrees from the University of Dhaka and his PhD from the University of East Anglia and the University of Aberdeen.

== Career ==
Chowdhury held academic positions at the University of Rajshahi and Shahjalal University of Science and Technology before joining IUB in 1994. He served as the Vice-Chancellor of IUB from 1994 to 2011. During his tenure, he played a crucial role in shaping the university's academic programs, research initiatives, and infrastructure development.
