= Independent University, Bangladesh =

Private University in Bangladesh

Independent University, Bangladesh (IUB)
- ইন্ডিপেন্ডেন্ট বিশ্ববিদ্যালয়, বাংলাদেশ
- Crest of Independent University, Bangladesh
- Motto: Teacheth man that which he knew not
- Type: Private, Research
- Established: 1993; 33 years ago
- Accreditation: IEB; UGC; AACSB; ACBSP; PCB; Bar Council
- Affiliations: University Grants Commission (UGC)
- Chancellor: President Mirza Fakhrul Islam Alamgir
- Vice-Chancellor: Mohammad Tamim
- Faculty: ~500
- Students: ~9,000
- Location: Plot 16, Block B, Aftabuddin Ahmed Road 1245, Bashundhara, Dhaka, Dhaka, 1245, Bangladesh; 23.8156°N 90.4276°E
- Campus: 4 acres (1.6 ha); Urban
- Language: English
- Research Grants Allocated to Faculties: BDT 23,300,000 (2023-25)
- Colors: Blue, Saffron and Purple
- Website: iub.ac.bd

University rankings

Global – Overall
- QS World: 1401+ (2026)

Regional – Overall
- QS Asia: 574 (2026)

Independent University, Bangladesh (Bengali: ইন্ডিপেন্ডেন্ট বিশ্ববিদ্যালয়, more commonly known as IUB) is a private research university in Dhaka, Bangladesh. Founded in 1993 under the Private University Act, 1992. The university awards bachelor's degrees and master's degrees in a wide variety of subjects within business, humanities, social sciences, information technology, engineering, medicine and space and astronomy.

The university has over 19,000 students, both national and international, and is one of Bangladesh's top private universities. It is the first university in Bangladesh to launch deep-sky imaging telescopes.

== History ==
Independent University, Bangladesh was established in 1993 by A.Majeed Khan with a group of prominent intellectuals and business leaders in the country

=== Vice-chancellors ===
- Bazlul Mobin Chowdhury (1994 – 2011)
- M Omar Ejaz Rahman (2012 – 2020)
- Milan Pagon (Acting)
- Tanweer Hasan (23 February 2022 – 15 August 2024)
- Mohammad Tamim (17 December 2024 – Present)

Pro Vice-Chancellors

- Milan Pagon (2017 – 2021)
- Niaz Ahmed Khan (2021 – 2024)
- Daniel W. Lund (2025 – present)

== Academic departments ==
The educational curriculum adheres to the North American Liberal Arts Model, with English serving as the medium of instruction. The university's departments are organized into five schools.

=== School of Business and Entrepreneurship (SBE) ===
The School of Business and Entrepreneurship (SBE) at IUB offers undergraduate and master's degrees. SBE provides students with a variety of study, job, and intellectual development possibilities. SBE of IUB is accredited by the Accreditation Council for Business Schools and Programs (ACBSP).

The institution now offers nine undergraduate majors and four graduate majors. More than 4500 students attend the school, with most courses having a student-to-teacher ratio around 30:1. The courses offered by the school are transferable to any other college or university in the world.

- Department of Accounting
- Department of Economics
- Department of Finance
- Department of General Management
- Department of Human Resource Management
- Department of International Business--
- Department of Management Information Systems
- Department of Marketing
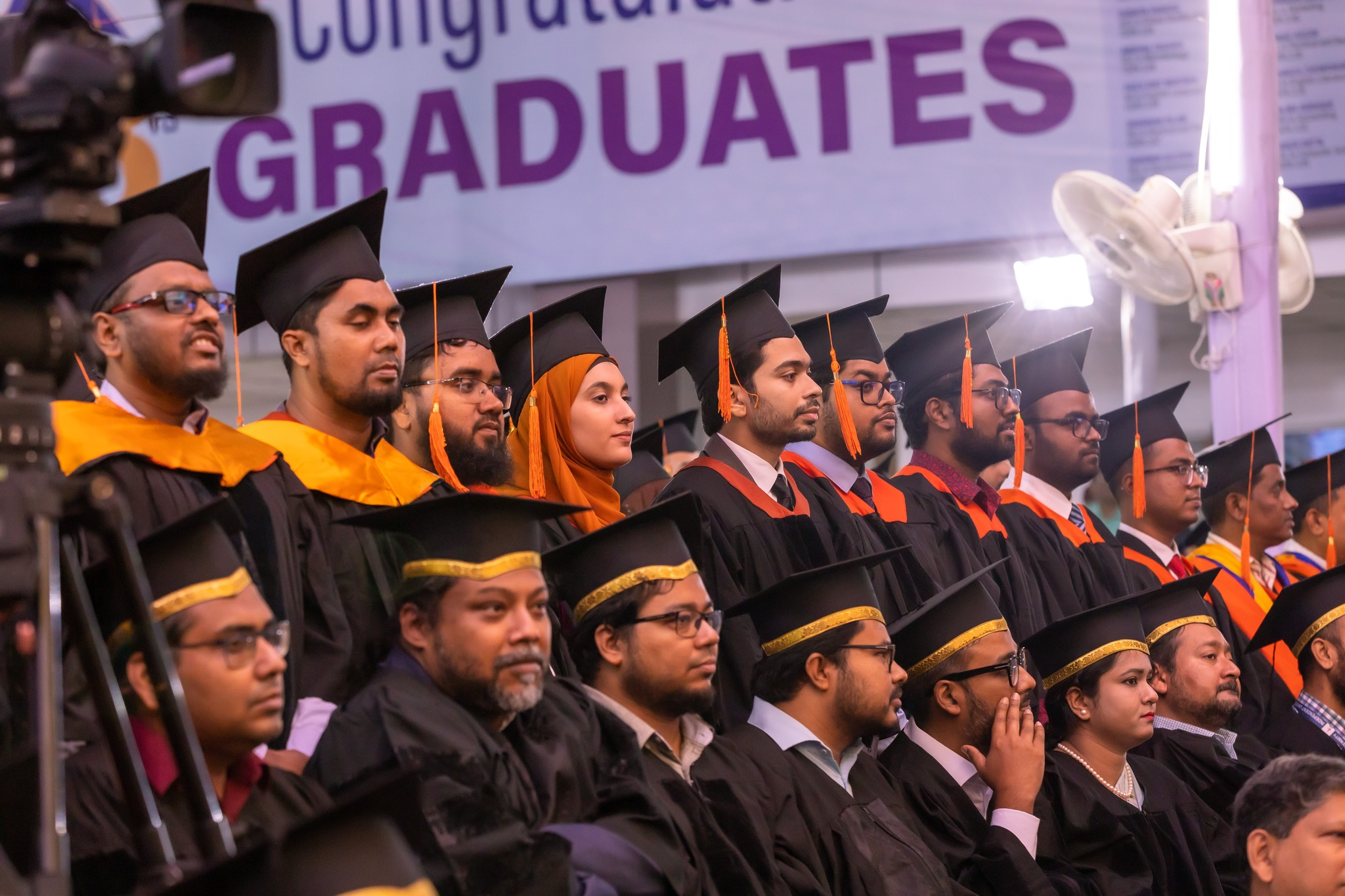

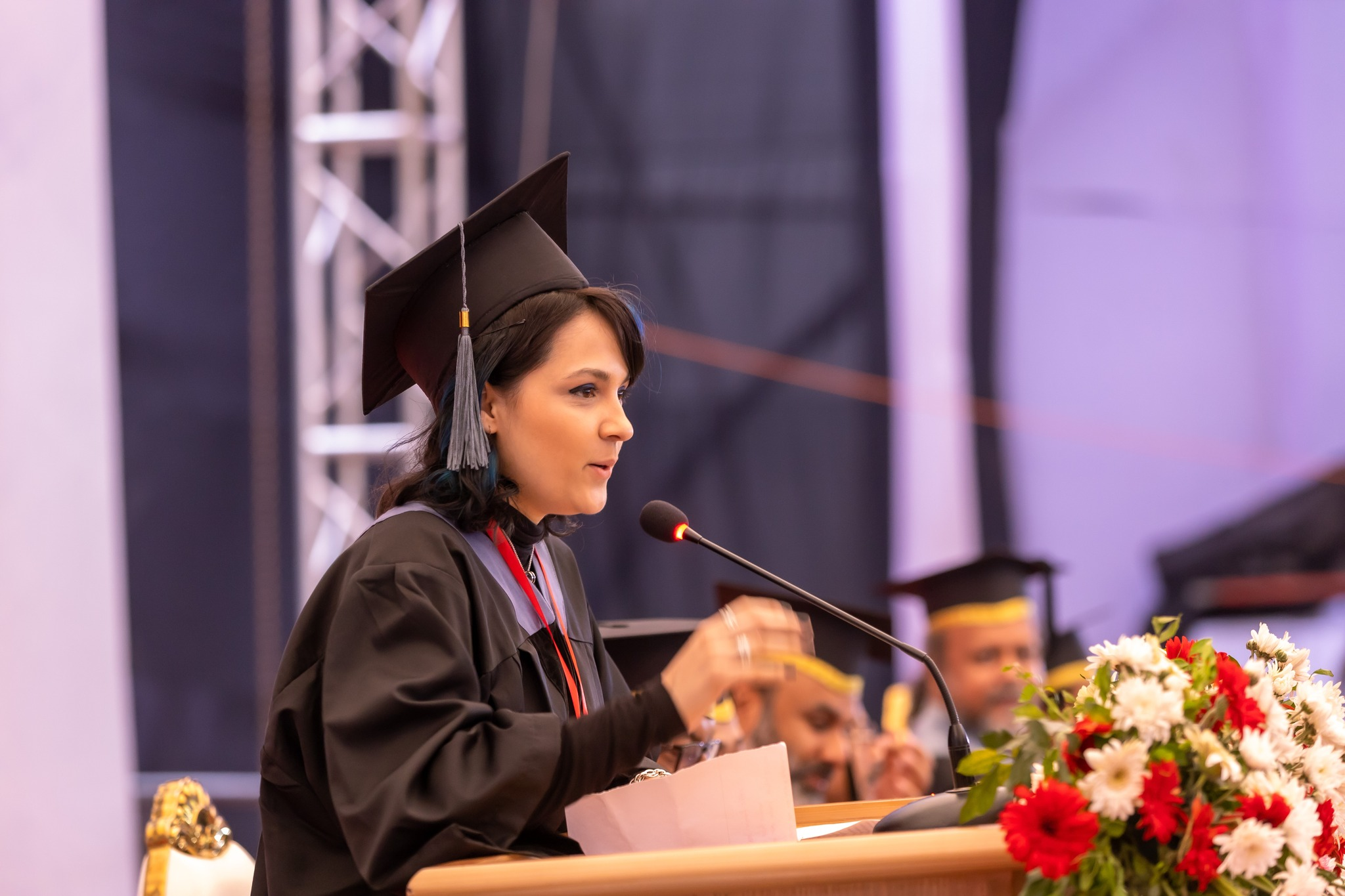
IUB 23rd convocation

==== Graduate program (MBA) ====
The school offers an MBA degree. Students are allowed up to five years from the date of initial enrollment to complete the degree requirements. It is possible to finish the program within five semesters by taking the maximum course load, or within three semesters if students have waivers or transfer courses. Available areas of concentration are banking, finance, human resources management, and marketing.

==== Graduate program (EMBA) ====
The school also offers an EMBA degree.

==== Graduate program (MSc Economics) ====
The school also offers a Master of Science (MSc) in Economics degree. The program offers a concentration in Development Economics, International Economics, Applied Econometrics, Financial Economics and Environmental and Natural Resource Economics.

=== School of Engineering, Technology, and Sciences (SETS) ===
==== Undergraduate program ====
The school offers undergraduate programs on various majors under the Department of Electrical and Electronic Engineering, Department of Computer Science and Engineering and Department of Physical Sciences:

- B.Sc. in Electrical & Electronic Engineering (EEE)
- B.Sc. in Electrical & Telecommunication Engineering (ETE)
- B.Sc. in Computer Science & Engineering (CSE)
- B.Sc. in Computer Science (CS)
- B.Sc. in Computer Engineering (CEN)
- B.Sc. in Physics
- B.Sc. in Mathematics

==== Graduate program ====
- M.Sc. in Computer Networks and Communications (CNC)
- M.Sc. in Telecommunication Engineering (TE)
- M.Sc. / M.Eng. in Electrical & Electronic Engineering (EEE)
- M.Sc. in Computer Science (CSC)
- M.Sc. in Software Engineering (SEN)

=== School of Environment and Life Sciences (SELS) ===
==== Undergraduate program ====
The school offers undergraduate programs on various majors under the Department of Environmental Science and Management and the Department of Life Sciences.

- Department of Environmental Science and Management:
1. B.Sc. in Environmental Science and Management
- Department of Life Sciences:
1. B.Sc. in Microbiology
2. B.Sc. in Biochemistry and Biotechnology

==== Graduate program ====
The school offers graduate programs on various majors.

=== School of Liberal Arts and Social Sciences (SLASS) ===
==== Undergraduate program ====
The school offers undergraduate programs in Anthropology, Sociology, Global Studies and Governance, Media and Communication, English Literature, English Language Teaching, and Law. The Media and Communication program includes areas such as advertising, film studies, journalism, and development communication. The school also offers undergraduate minors in several of these disciplines, as well as foundation courses in subjects including history, philosophy, art, politics, music, and culture.

==== Graduate program ====
The school offers graduate programs in Development Studies, English Language Teaching, Media and Communication, and English Literature.

=== School of Pharmacy and Public Health (SPPH) ===
==== Undergraduate program ====
The school offers an undergraduate program in Pharmacy.

1. Bachelor of Pharmacy (BPharm)

==== Executive Master of Public Health ====
The school offers an executive master of Public Health.

== Notable faculty members ==
- Niaz Zaman (academic)
- Mustafa Zaman Abbasi (musicologist)
- Shah M. Faruque (microbiologist)
- Mohammad A. Arafat (former minister of state for information and broadcasting)
- J. M. A. Hannan (pharmacologist)
- Saleemul Huq (climatologist)
- Enamul Haque (musicologist, Ekushey Padak and Independence Day Award recipient)
- Niaz Ahmed Khan ( former Pro VC, 30th vice-chancellor of University of Dhaka)
- Zakir Hossain Raju (Film Scholar, Member of the Bangladesh Film Certification Board)
- Imran Rahman (Musician, academic)

== Demographics ==
Demographic of student body (2022)
Student	2022	2021	2020	2019
Male	59.33%	60.91%	61.97%	64.27%
Female	40.67%	39.09%	38.03%	35.73%

== Campus ==
The IUB campus spans across 4 acres, featuring an amphitheater and laboratories dedicated to life, environmental, and social sciences, as well as engineering. The infrastructure includes 95 multimedia classrooms, equipped for both physical and online classes. Accommodations are provided in the form of a dormitory for female students from outside Dhaka and a guest house for visiting scholars.

=== Facilities ===
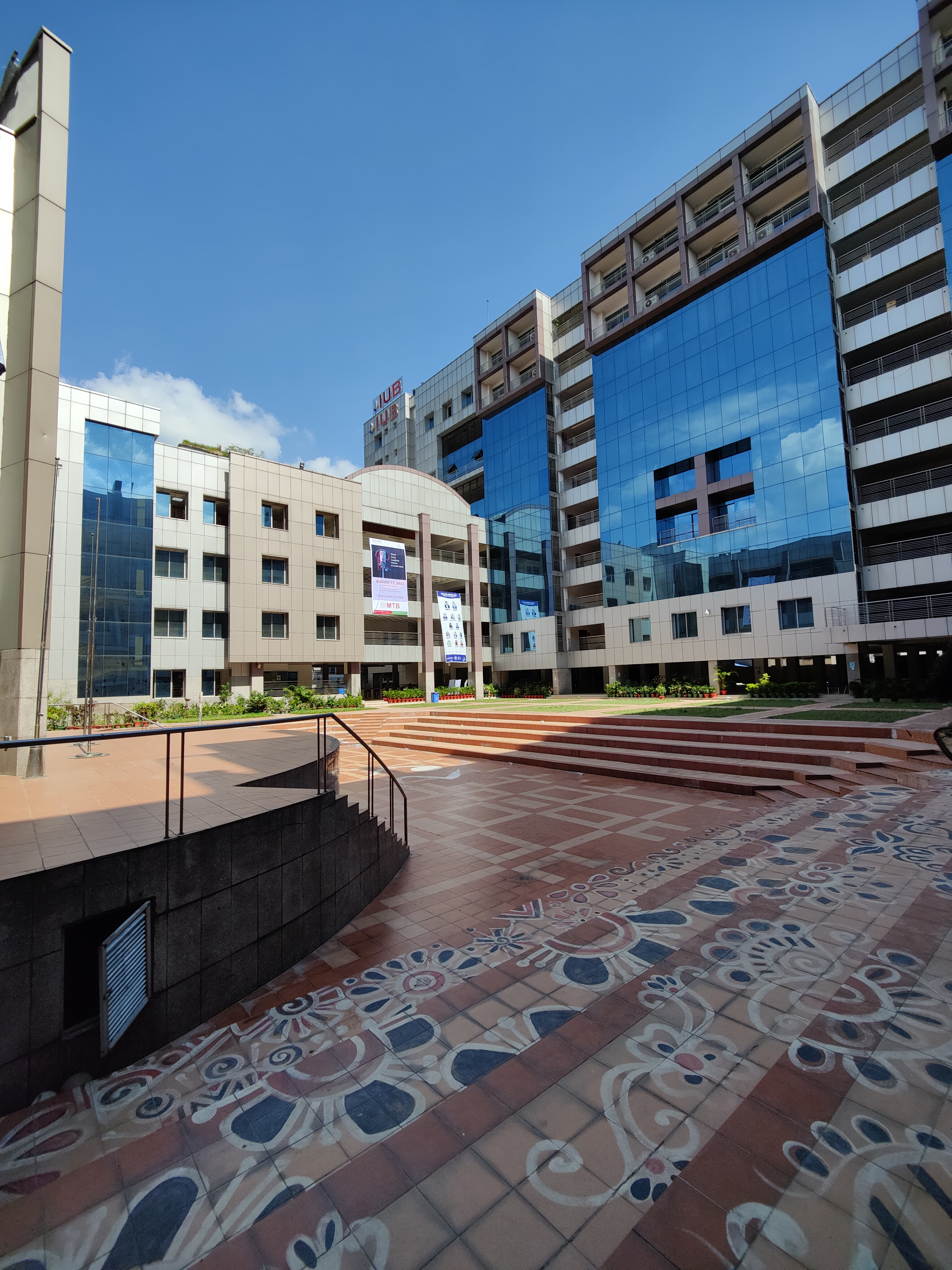
Arena of IUB

Academic Facilities

- Classrooms
- Laboratories
- Library
- Digital Meeting Room

Sports and Recreational Facilities:

- Gymnasiums
- Squash Court
- Sports Complex
- Yoga and Self-Defense Studios
- Outdoor Facilities (football field, cricket ground, and basketball court)

Other Facilities:

- Auditorium
- Food Court and Cafeteria
- Student Center
- Health Center
- Transportation Services

=== Swimming Pool ===
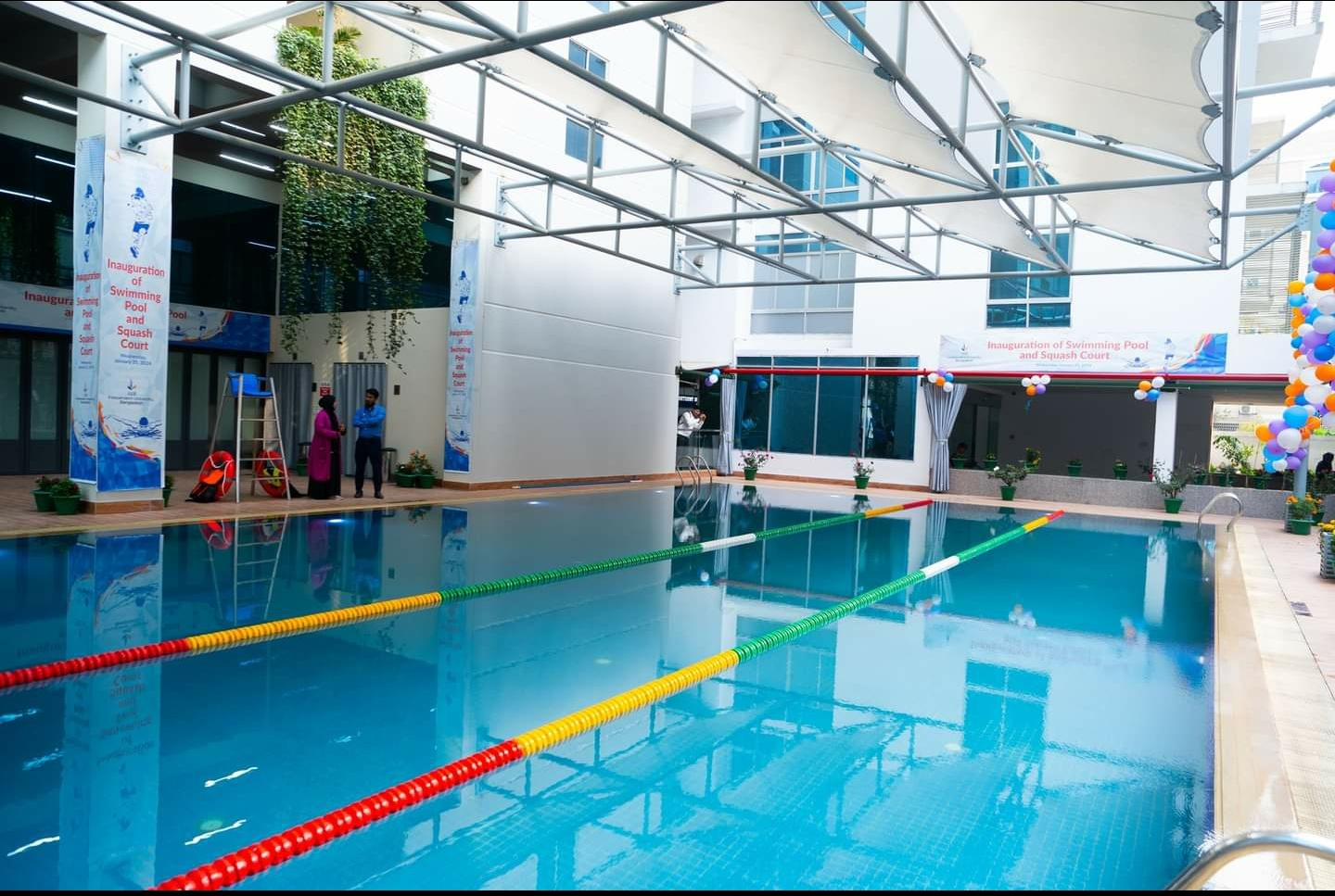
Swimming Pool at IUB

The swimming pool at IUB is an overflow type pool having the size of 32 feet x 56 feet. The depth of the pool is 3.5 feet to 5.5 feet and it has the filtration and heating systems in it to keep the pool clean and warm. There are facilities of changing rooms and showers in the pool. The pool is the part of IUB squash court and fitness center where there are cardio and strength training machines as well. Swimming pool facility is available for everyone including all IUB students, faculty members and staff, as well as the public. There are different kinds of swimming programs for people of all ages and levels of expertise in the swimming pool.

=== Library ===
Established in 1992 within a single room in a rented residence at Banani, Dhaka, the IUB Library received an initial donation of 160 volumes of books from A. Majeed Khan, the founder president and president emeritus of IUB. Driven by a commitment to learning and discovery, the library quickly expanded, moving to larger spaces at House number 8, Road 10, Baridhara, Dhaka, in 1993, and later to two floors of a rented house on Baridhara's Road 14, House number 5, in 1998.

The IUB Library, which covers an area of more than 22360 square feet, aims at providing information concerning the curriculum and services of the university. The library possesses books, magazines, catalogs of universities, newspapers, audiocassettes, video cassettes, DVD's / CD's, and data disks. The users can have access to more than 30,000 printed books, 2617 audio visual items, as well as 25,000 electronic journals, 250,000 e-books, and 13 national dailies in Bangla and English. It has used the most advanced information technologies for enhancing its services, including automation of catalog searching and returning. The library collection is classified into sixteen groups as follows: Art, Culture and History; Business; Chemistry and Physics; Communication; Computer Science; Economics; Education; Engineering; Environment Management; Health and Population; Language and Literature; Mathematics and Statistics; Political Science & Public Administration; Science: General; Social Science.

=== Accommodation ===
IUB provides a secure dormitory to accommodate female students arriving from locations outside Dhaka, as well as foreign students. Additionally, a guesthouse is available to host visiting scholars.

== Rankings ==
University rankings

Global – Overall
- THE World: 1001–1500 (2024)

Regional – Overall
- QS Asia: 195 (Southern Asia) 641– 660 ( Asia) (2024)

In the latest Times Higher Education Interdisciplinary Science Rankings 2025, IUB is placed in the 401-500 bracket globally and ranked fifth among all public and private universities in the country and AD scientific Index 2024, IUB ranked joint top among all private universities and 3rd among all public and private institutions in Bangladesh. In the 2024 QS World University Rankings, IUB achieved a ranking of 1001–1500 globally and 641– 660 on Asian university rankings and 195 on Southern Asia.

== Gallery ==
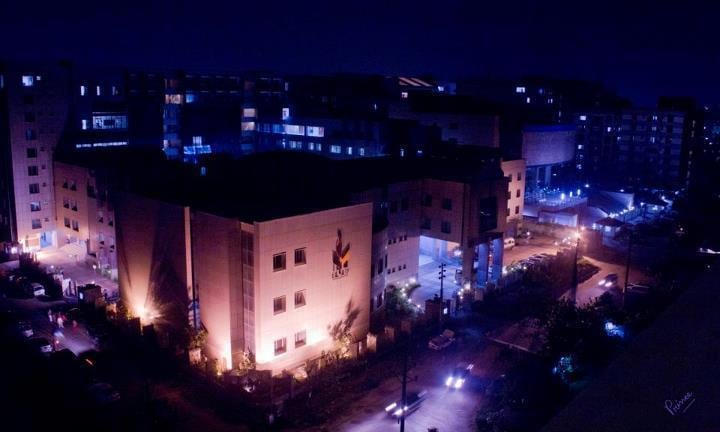

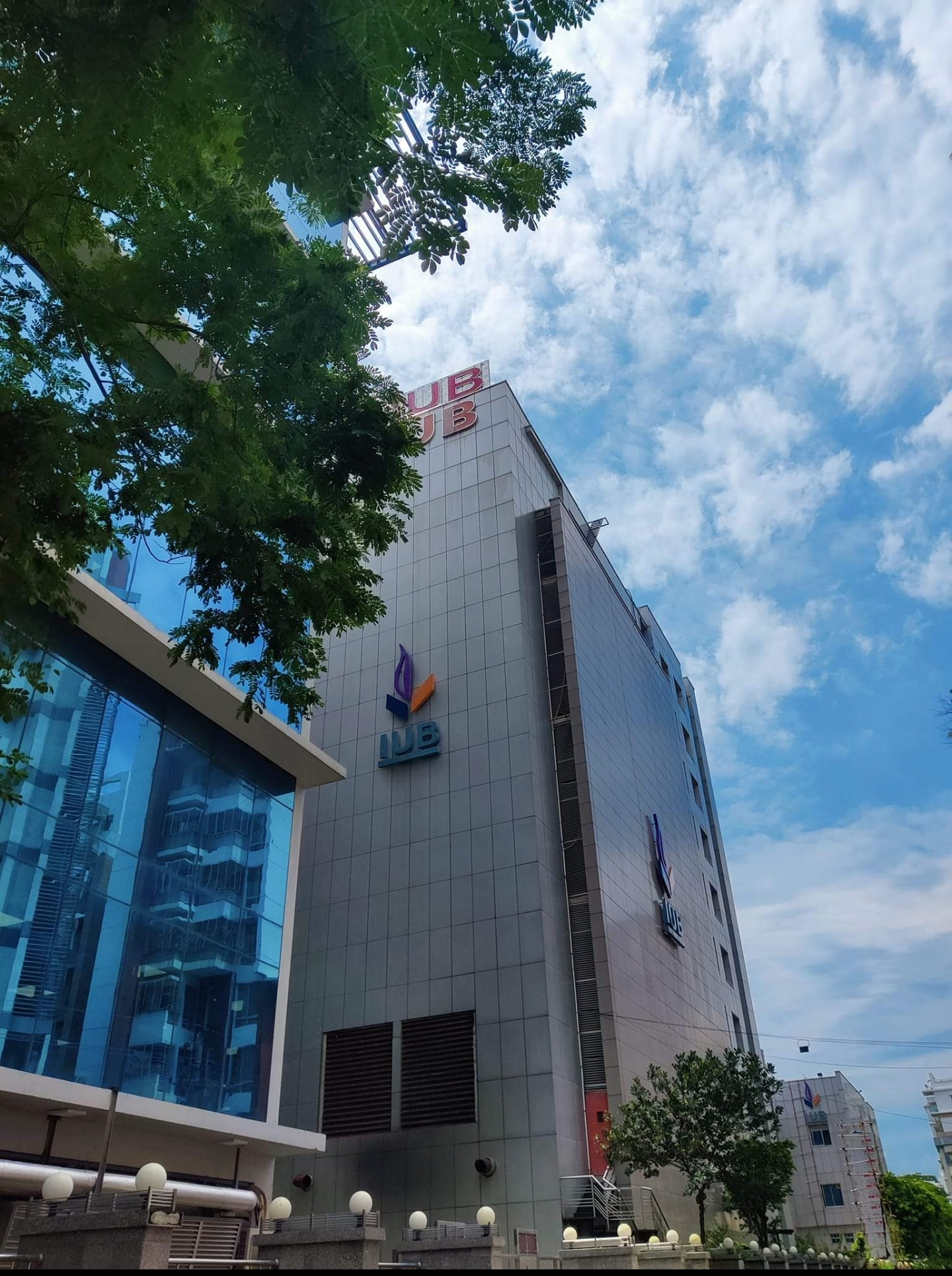

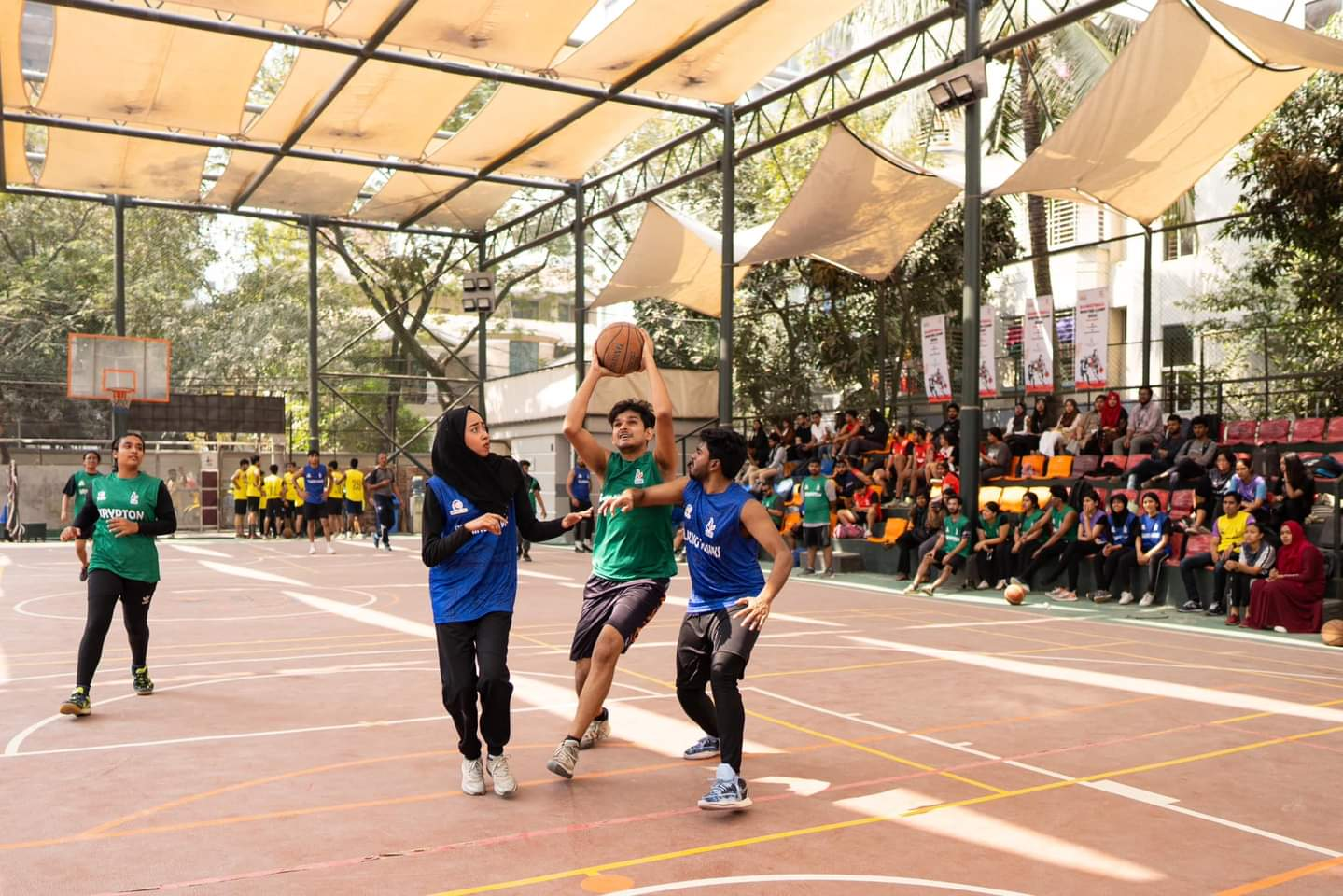

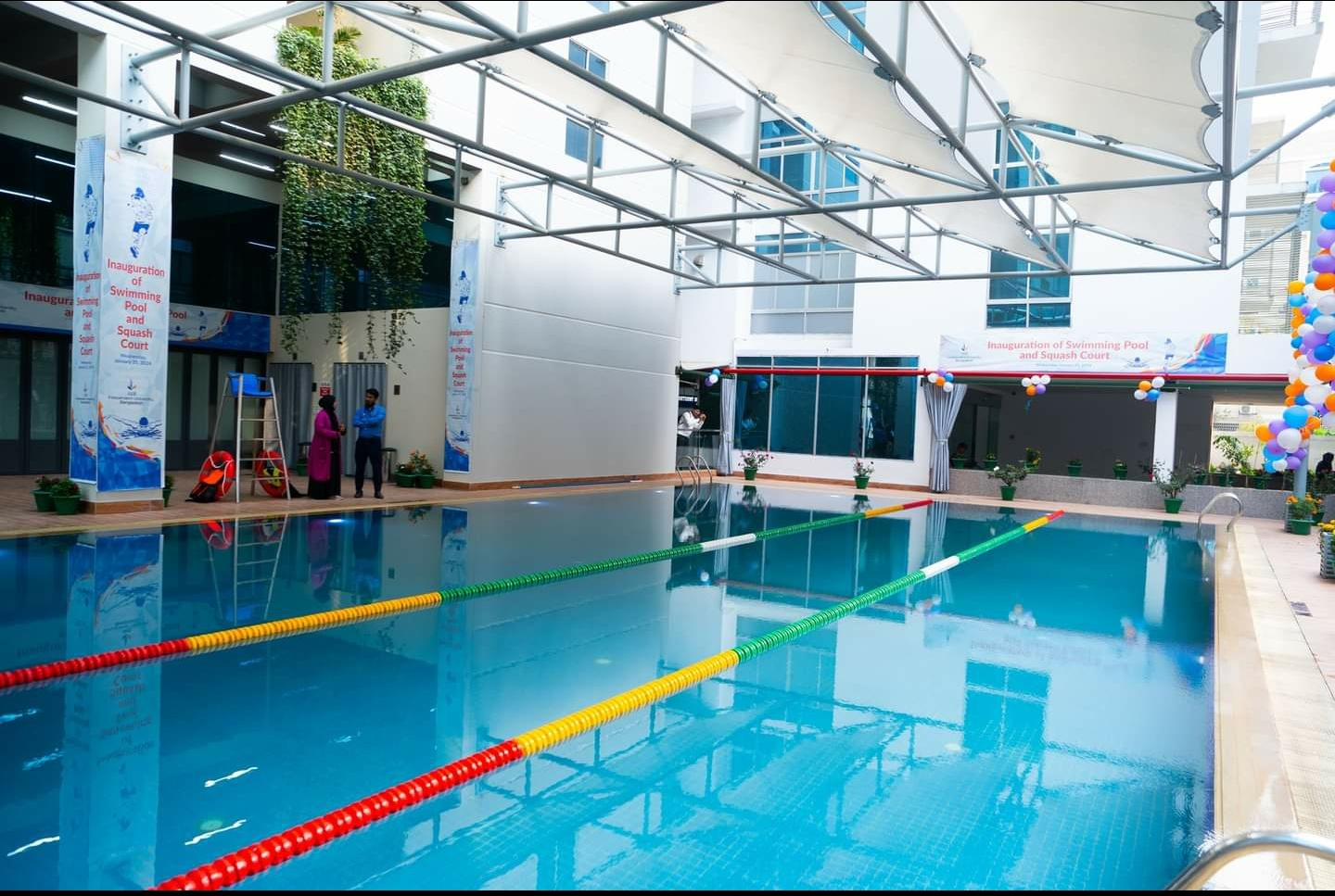

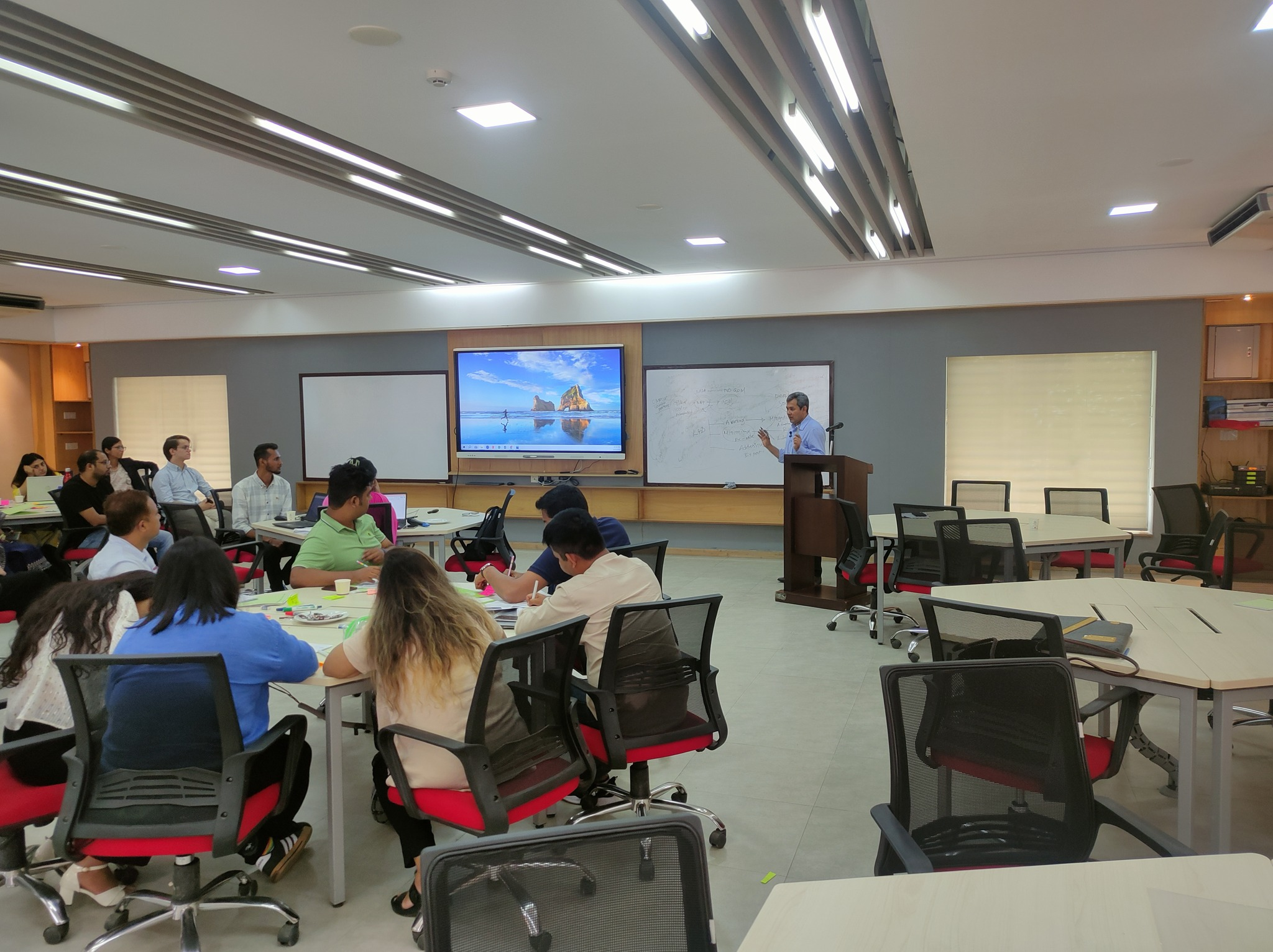

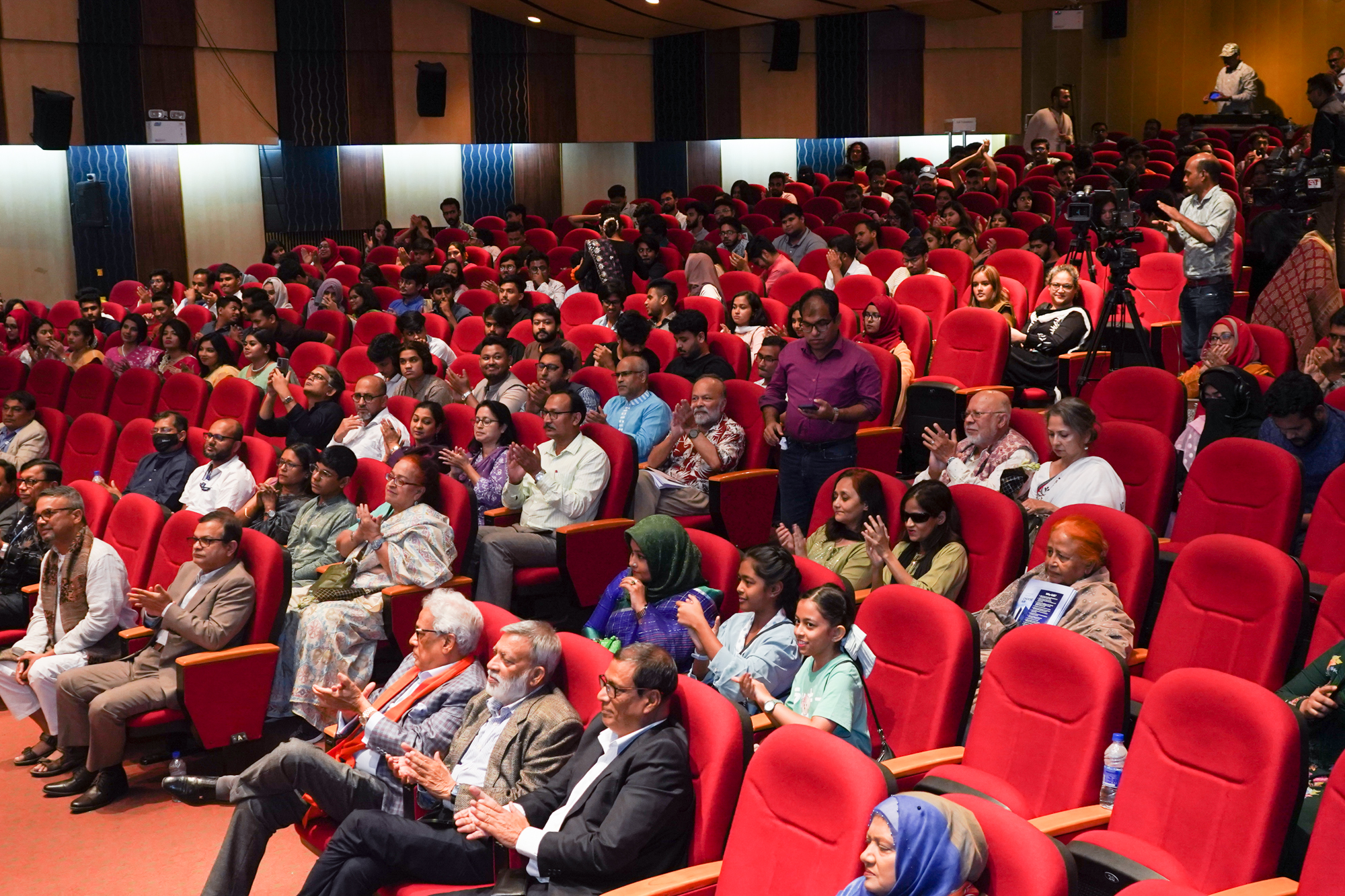

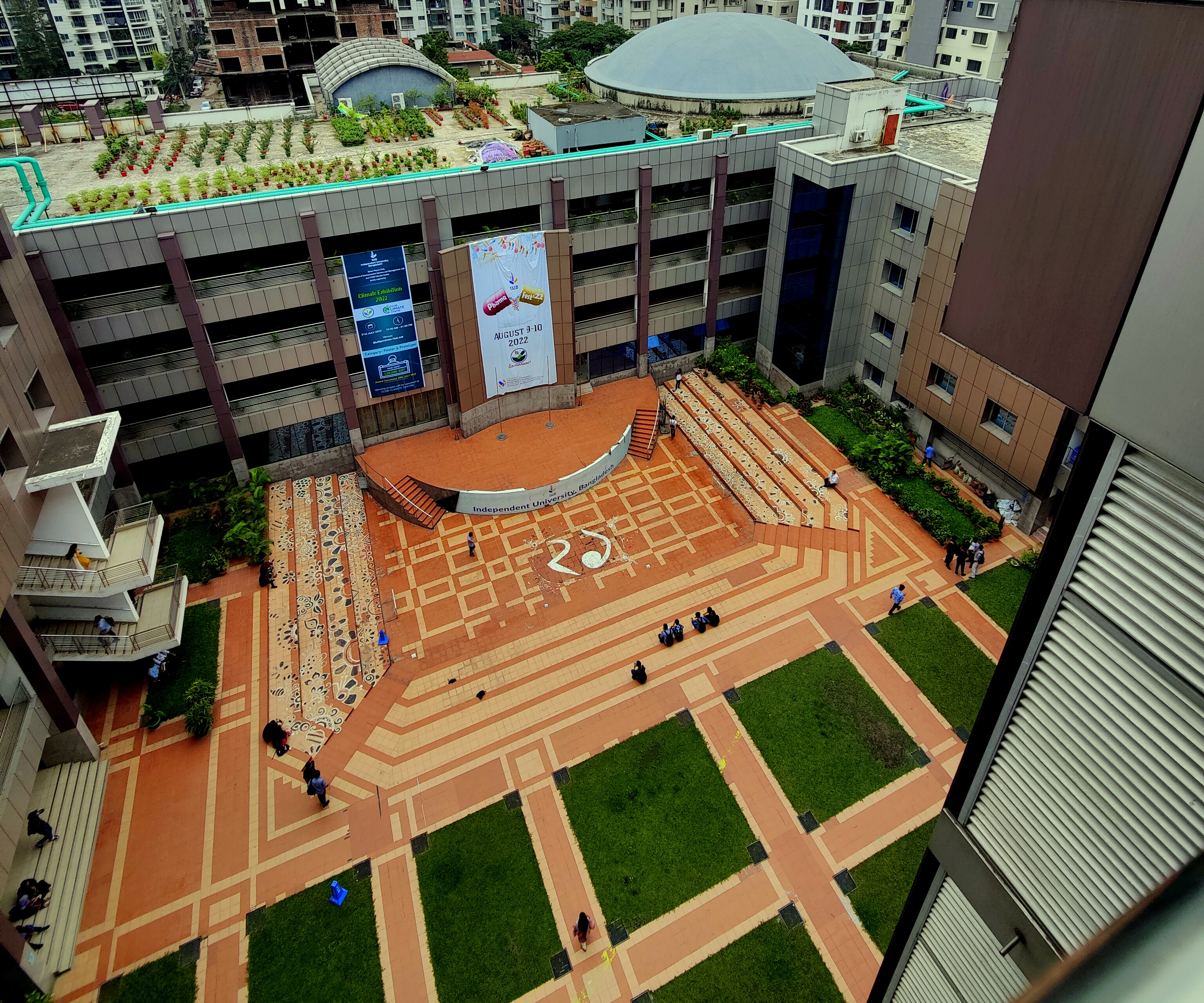

== Notable people ==
=== Alumni ===
- Mishu Sabbir, actor
- Nazifa Tushi, actress
- Jannatul Ferdous Oishee, model and actress
- Nishita Barua, singer
- Shirin Akter Shila, model
- Ziaul Roshan, actor
- Rafsan TheChotoBhai, youtuber
- Sadia Khalid Reeti, youtuber
