= Shamsad Mortuza =

Bangladeshi academic and writer

- শামসাদ মর্তুজা
- Education: Jahangirnagar University (MA); Birkbeck, University of London (PhD)
- Occupations: Professor, University administrator
- Years active: 1991-present
- Spouse: Shahnaz Gazi
- Children: Arshi

Shamsad Mortuza is a Bangladeshi academic and writer. In 2025, Mortuza became the Vice Chancellor of the University of Liberal Arts Bangladesh (ULAB). He also served as the former pro-vice-chancellor of the University of Liberal Arts Bangladesh. He worked as a journalist for The Daily Star.

== Early life and education ==
Mortuza completed his master's in English language at Jahangirnagar University in 1991. has a master's in American Indian studies from the University of Arizona. He completed his PhD at the Birkbeck, University of London. His thesis, The Figure of the Shaman in Contemporary British Poetry, was published by the Cambridge Scholars Publishers. He was a Fulbright postdoctoral Fellow at the University of California, Los Angeles.

== Career ==
Mortuza joined Jahangirnagar University on 8 March 1994. He worked as a journalist for The Daily Star. He was the chairman of the Department of English at Jahangirnagar University from 2005 to 2008. He left Jahangirnagar University on 30 May 2011.

Mortuza joined the University of Dhaka as an associate professor on 5 June 2011. He was promoted to professor in June 2015. On 1 August 2016, he took leave from the University of Dhaka and joined the University of Liberal Arts Bangladesh as the head of the Department of English and Humanities. In September 2018, he was appointed the pro-vice chancellor of the University of Liberal Arts Bangladesh.

In 2021, Mortuza was the acting vice-chancellor of the University of Liberal Arts Bangladesh. He launched ULAB Literary Salon in 2022 with his daughter Arshi Mortuza where they both recited poetry. He was the project lead for Climate Strategies and the University of Liberal Arts Bangladesh. He is a special advisor to the Board of Trustees of the University of Liberal Arts Bangladesh.

== Personal life ==
Mortuza is married to Shahnaz Gazi, current ambassador of Bangladesh to Romania since January 2025. Their daughter, Arshi Mortuza, is a poet and teacher.

== Bibliography ==
- Barkode
- I Spy
- Blowing in the Wind

== Controversy ==
Following the 2024 Student-People's Mass Uprising, a reform movement emerged within the Department of English at the University of Dhaka, during which several faculty members faced criticism from students over their perceived roles during the uprising. Amid broader resentment toward senior academics and widely known intellectuals, whom protesters perceived as silent supporters of alleged human rights violations under the Hasina government, some Gen-Z students used the phrase "0% contribution, 100% celebration" to criticize senior academics, including Fakrul Alam. In July 2025, Mortuza responded to the controversy by publishing an opinion article in The Daily Star. In the article, he criticized Gen-Z slogans and commented on the protesters' socio-economic and religious backgrounds, which subsequently drew criticism from students and academics.
