= H. M. Jahirul Haque =

Professor Dr. H. M. Jahirul Haque

Vice-Chancellor

Canadian University of Bangladesh
- Incumbent
- Assumed office 21 April 2022
- Preceded by: Mohammad Mahfuzul Islam

Vice-Chancellor

University of Liberal Arts Bangladesh
- In office 2017–2021
- Succeeded by: Imran Rahman

Personal details
- Education: Cherkasy State Technological University, Ukraine; Kharkiv State Technical University of Radio Electronics, Ukraine
- Occupation: Professor, University Administrator

H. M. Jahirul Haque is a Bangladeshi academic and Vice-Chancellor of the Canadian University of Bangladesh. He is the former Vice-Chancellor of the University of Liberal Arts Bangladesh. He is a former Senior Advisor to the Board of Trustees of the Canadian University of Bangladesh.

== Early life ==
Haque did his master's in technical science at the Cherkasy State Technological University in 1995. He completed his PhD in 2001 at the Kharkiv National University of Radioelectronics.

== Career ==
From March 2002 to July 2004, Haque taught at the Leading University. In 2004, Haque joined the University of Liberal Arts Bangladesh. He was made the head of the Department of computer science and engineering.

From 2013 to 2017, Haque was the Pro Vice-Chancellor of the University of Liberal Arts Bangladesh. Haque was appointed the 4th Vice-Chancellor of the University of Liberal Arts Bangladesh in May 2017. He served in that role till 2021.

In April 2022, Haque was appointed Vice-Chancellor of the Canadian University of Bangladesh. He is an advisory member of Bangladesh Society for Private University Academics,
