= Tanweer Hasan =

Bangladeshi academic and former vice-chancellor of IUB

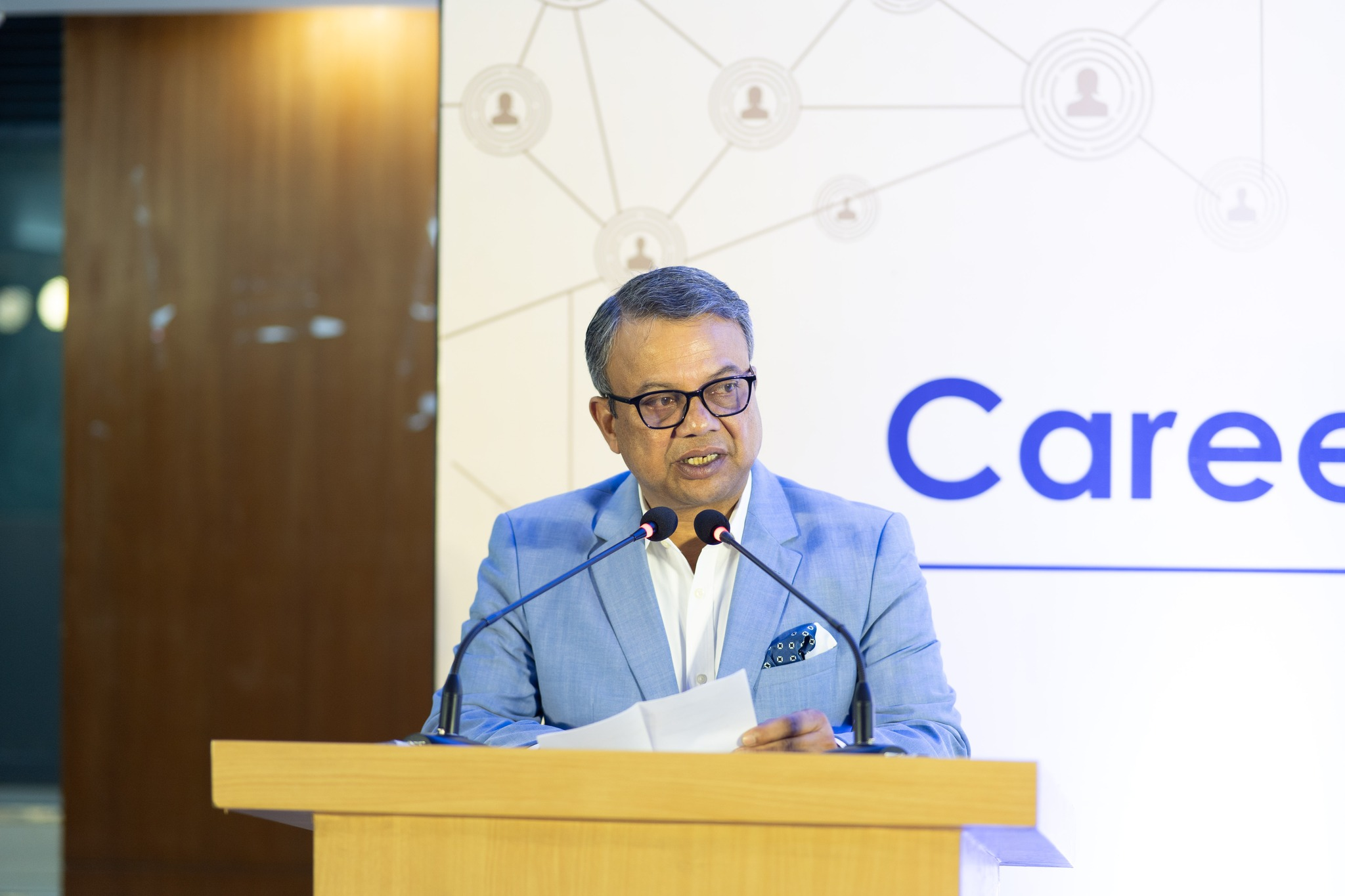
- Tanweer Hasan in 2024

3rd Vice-Chancellor of Independent University Bangladesh
- In office 23 February 2022 – 15 August 2024
- Mohammed Shahabuddin
- Preceded by: Mohammed Omar Ejaz Rahman

Personal details
- Education: University of Dhaka; Baylor University; Harvard University; University of Houston

Tanweer Hasan is a Bangladeshi academic and former vice-chancellor of the Independent University, Bangladesh.

== Early life ==
Hasan studied at the Mirzapur Cadet College. In 1986, Hasan graduated with a B.Com in finance from the University of Dhaka. In 1989, he completed an MBA from Baylor University. He did his Management Development Program from the Harvard University. In 1993, he completed his PhD from the University of Houston.

== Career ==
Hasan was a professor of accounting and finance at the Roosevelt University. He was based in the Robin Campus of the University. He was an associate provost at the university. He was a visiting fellow at the Institute for Inclusive Finance and Development.

On 23 February 2021, Hasan was appointed vice-chancellor of the Independent University, Bangladesh. He was given a four year term. He provided laptops to new faculties of the university sponsored by Abdul Hai Sarker, chairman of the board of trustee and Purbani Group. He signed an agreement to host the King Sejong Institute in the university.
