= PEN Bangladesh =

- Formation: 1948
- Type: Literary organization
- Purpose: Promote literature and defend freedom of expression in Bangladesh
- Headquarters: Dhaka, Bangladesh
- Region served: Bangladesh
- Official language: English, Bengali
- Parent organization: PEN International
- Website: penintlbangladesh.org

PEN Bangladesh is one of the 148 centers of PEN International. It is a bilingual society of Bangladesh-based writers, poets, publishers, editors, translators, journalists and academics, aimed at promoting literature and defending the freedom of expression in Bangladesh.

For the 2018–2020 period, the president of PEN Bangladesh was Syed Manzoorul Islam, Rabindra University Vice Chancellor Biswajit Ghose, writer Ahmed Reza and Maleka Ferdousi were elected vice presidents while Ferdousi Mahmud and Lovely Bashar were elected joint secretaries general of the committee.

== History ==
Bangladesh PEN was originally established in the year 1948 soon after the partition of India as the then Pakistan PEN by Muhammad Shahidullah as its president and Syed Ali Ahsan as the secretary general. After the liberation of Bangladesh in 1971, the Pakistan PEN in Bangladesh was renamed as Bangladesh PEN.

Former presidents of PEN Bangladesh include:

Period	Person	Source
	Muhammad Shahidullah	
	Syed Ali Ahsan	
2003–2018	Farida Hossain	
2018–2020	Syed Manzoorul Islam	

2021–2024 (Kazi Anis Ahmed) 2025-Present (Dr. Shamsad Mortuza)

Secretary-General/ 2021–2024 (Muhammad Moheuddin) 2025-Present (Jahanara Parveen)
