= Farida Hossain =

Bangladeshi writer

Farida Hossain (born 19 January 1945) is a Bangladeshi writer, playwright, editor, director, and translator.

Hossain was born on 19 January 1945, in Kolkata, India, one of five siblings. Her father was a lawyer who worked with the International Labour Organization. She later moved with her family to Bangladesh, living in Chittagong, then Narayanganj, and finally settling in Dhaka.

She began her career as a writer with a stage adaptation of Snow White in the Bangla language, which received a local award. Following this she was invited to work with Radio Pakistan, where she wrote, and performed stories, poems, and plays written by herself and others. While continuing to perform and write for radio, she published over 60 books during her career, including translations, novels, poetry, and plays.

She also wrote and directed several short films for children, which were broadcast in Bangladesh.

In 2004, she won the Ekushey Padak, Bangladesh's second highest civilian honor, for her contributions to literature. She served as the president of the PEN Bangladesh Centre from 2003 and 2018. She married Mohammad Mosharraf Hossain, with whom she had several children. She also founded a charitable organisation, Anjum Shishu Kollayan (Children's Welfare Foundation), and a literary magazine, Obinosshor.
