= Canadian University of Bangladesh =

Private university in Dhaka, Bangladesh

- কানাডিয়ান ইউনিভার্সিটি অব বাংলাদেশ
- Motto: Inspiring Applied Knowledge
- Type: Private
- Established: 2015; 11 years ago
- Affiliations: University Grants Commission
- Vice-Chancellor: HM Jahirul Haque
- Location: City Campus: RL Square, Kha 201/1, 203, 205/3, Bir Uttam Rafiqul Islam Avenue, Merul Badda 1212, Dhaka, Bangladesh; 23.774701°N 90.425681°E
- Campus: Urban
- Colours: Red and white
- Website: cub.edu.bd

Canadian University of Bangladesh is a private university in Dhaka, Bangladesh. The university is affiliated to the University Grants Commission. Chowdhury Nafeez Sarafat is the chairperson of the board of trustees. H. M. Jahirul Haque is the vice-chancellor of the university.

== History ==
Canadian University of Bangladesh was approved by the government of Bangladesh on 10 January 2016. It was founded by Chowdhury Nafeez Sarafat, a Bangladeshi-Canadian businessman. The university started operations from June 2016.

The university offers Sarafat Chowdhury Merit Scholarship to students based on their academic performance.

Canadian University Alumni Association was formed on 28 May 2019 in Dhaka. In June 2019, Canadian University of Bangladesh signed a MOU with the Universiti Teknologi Petronas in Malaysia.

=== List of vice-chancellors ===
- Muhammad Mahfuzul Islam (2018 – 2022)
- HM Jahirul Haque (21 April 2022 – present)

== Land transfer controversy ==
These plots have been acquired for the people’s benefit. But is it a correct decision to allocate a plot to a private organisation at cheap prices? Plots are allotted for primary schools, universities, secondary schools in the masterplan, but they allotted a plot for a secondary school to a private university. It's unlawful!

— Ministry of Housing and Public Works official, quoted by Bdnews24.com

In 2019, the Bangladesh Ministry of Housing and Public Works accused the Rajdhani Unnayan Kartripakkha (RAJUK) (Capital Development Authority of the Government of Bangladesh) with changing the status of a plot of land in violation of a High Court ruling, allowing the plot to be transferred to the Canadian University of Bangladesh. The plot had been allocated for construction of a secondary school, but had been reclassified as available for a private university (the Canadian University), allegedly in violation proper procedures for altering the Master Plan of the Purbachal New Town project.

According to the Ministry, the High Court had approved one part of a proposed fifth amendment to the Plan (addition of a 142-storey tower) but had rejected the rest, and had instructed RAJUK to not modify the category of plots mentioned in the Plan. But, according to the Ministry, RAJUK changed the classification of the plot anyway.

According to local real estate experts, the plot was worth about 1.02 billion taka (about $12,000,000 in American dollars).

Both the university and RAJUK denied malfeasance.

== Board of trustees ==
Name	Designation	Reference
Chowdhury Nafeez Sarafat	Founding chairperson	
Anjuman Ara Shahid	Vice-chairperson	
Raheeb Chowdhury	Trustee	
