= Mohammed Omar Ejaz Rahman =

Bangladeshi academic

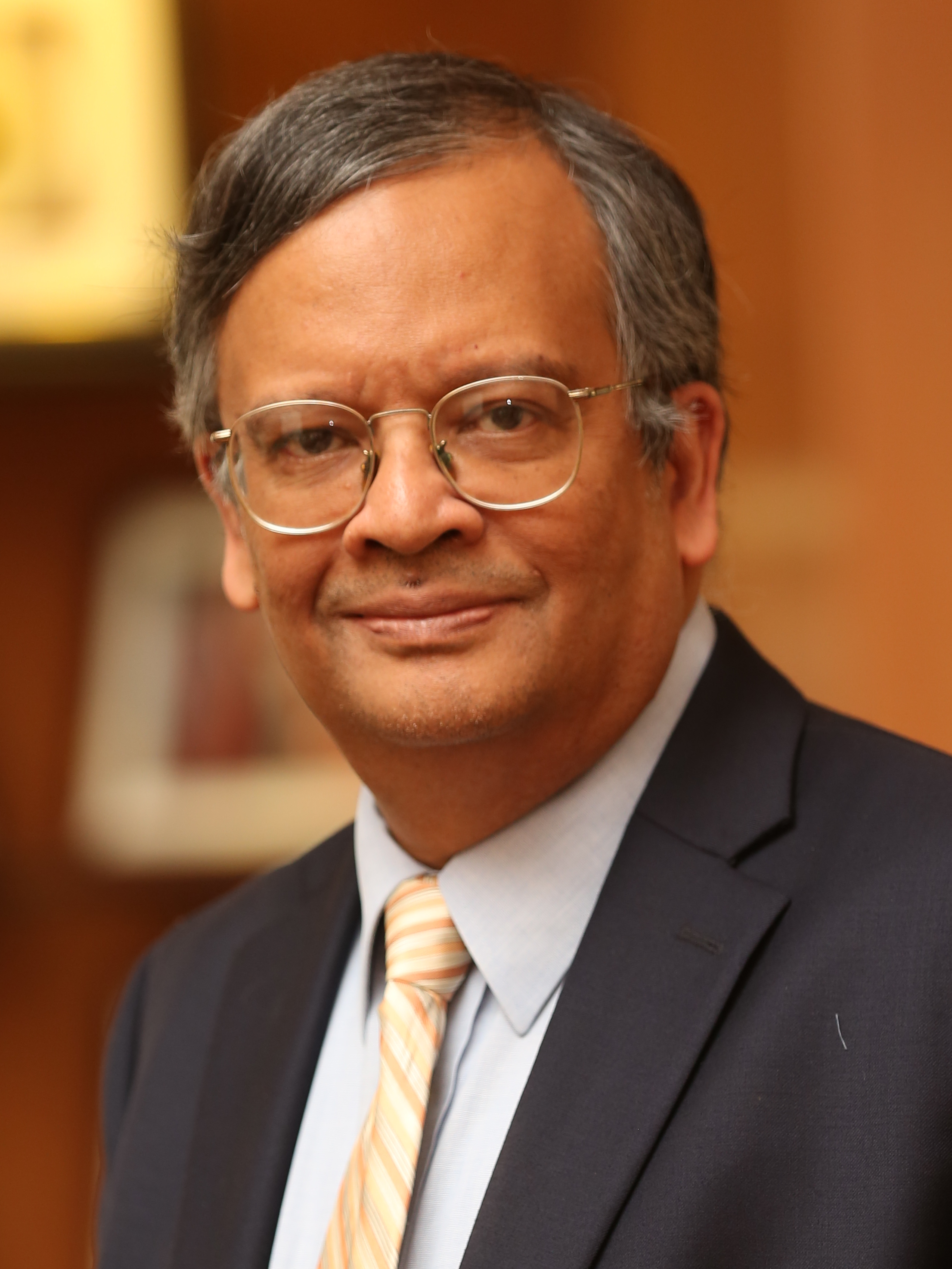
- Rahman in 2016

Dean of Research and Professor of Epidemiology at University of Liberal Arts Bangladesh
- In office 1 February 2020 – 31 January 2022

2nd Vice-Chancellor of Independent University Bangladesh
- In office 26 January 2012 – 26 January 2020

Personal details
- Born: 10 October 1957 (age 68)
- Education: Harvard University; Northwestern University Feinberg School of Medicine

Mohammed Omar Ejaz Rahman (born 10 October 1957) is a Bangladeshi academic psychiatrist and epidemiologist/demographer who was previously Dean of Research and Professor of Epidemiology and Demography at the University of Liberal Arts Bangladesh from 1 February 2020 to 31 January 2022. Prior to that, Rahman served as the vice-chancellor of Independent University, Bangladesh from 25 January 2012 until 26 January 2020. He was also an adjunct professor of epidemiology and demography (from 2015 to 2020) at the Harvard T.H. Chan School of Public Health, Harvard University.

== Education ==
Rahman completed his A.B. degree in biochemical sciences from Harvard University in 1979 and his M.D. degree from Northwestern University Feinberg School of Medicine in 1983. He went back to Harvard University and subsequently earned his M.P.H degree in health policy and management in 1987 and his D.Sc. degree in epidemiology in 1990. Rahman also trained in psychiatry at Harvard Medical School and is a U.S. board certified psychiatrist.

== Career ==
After completing his D.Sc. degree in epidemiology from Harvard University in 1990 Rahman spent five years (1990-1995) as a behavioral scientist at the RAND Corporation in Santa Monica, California. In January, 1996 he was appointed as an assistant professor of epidemiology and demography at the Department of Global Health and Population from the Harvard T.H. Chan School of Public Health. He was subsequently promoted to the position of an associate professor of epidemiology and demography in July, 1999 and continued in that position until July, 2003.

In August, 2003, Rahman moved back to Bangladesh (the country of his birth) to accept a position of professor of epidemiology and demography at Independent University, Bangladesh. He was appointed as the Pro Vice Chancellor there by the President of Bangladesh in April, 2006 and subsequently re-appointed for a second term in April, 2010. While serving in his second term as Pro Vice Chancellor, he was appointed as the Vice-Chancellor by the President of Bangladesh Zillur Rahman in January 2012. In January 2016, he was reappointed as the vice chancellor for another four-year term. In February, 2020, he accepted a position as Dean of Research and Professor of Epidemiology at University of Liberal Arts Bangladesh (ULAB).

== Research ==
Rahman is the author of several co-edited books, and multiple peer-reviewed articles on health and population, international migration and higher education policy in the developing world. He has received numerous research grants from the U.S. National Institutes of Health, the U.K. National Institute for Health Research, WHO, and several U.N. agencies. He has also served as a consultant to various international organizations. His current research interests are: urban rural risk factors for chronic diseases, health policy with a particular focus on mental health in the developing world, reproductive health, international professional migration, and higher education policy and practice in developing countries.
