= J. M. A. Hannan =

J. M. A. Hannan is the founder chairman and professor of the Department of Pharmaceutical Sciences, North South University, Dhaka, Bangladesh and the Department of Pharmacy, Independent University, Bangladesh. He is currently the dean of the School of Pharmacy and Public Health at Independent University Bangladesh. He has over 17 years of teaching and research experience. He has published a textbook on pharmaceutical statistics, the only of its kind published by a Bangladeshi author.

== Education ==
In 1991, Hannan graduated from Jahangirnagar University in Dhaka, with a Bachelor of Pharmacy degree, and the next year completed a Master of Pharmacy degree from the same university. He earned a PhD in pharmacology in 2004 from University of Ulster, UK for his dissertation Studies on the efficacy and mechanism of action of tropical plants for diabetes therapy.

== Career ==
- Independent University, Bangladesh, Dean, School of Pharmacy and Public Health 2020–present
- Independent University, Bangladesh, Head, Department of Pharmacy 2018-2020
- East West University, Dept of Pharmacy, Professor, 2016 to 2017
- North South University, Dhaka, Bangladesh - Head, Dept of Pharmacy (January 2006 – 2013)
- East West University, Dhaka, Bangladesh - Assistant Professor, Department of Pharmacy (2005–2006)
- Jahangirnagar University, Savar, Dhaka, Bangladesh - Part-time faculty, Department of Pharmacy (2005–2006)
- BIRDEM, Dhaka, Bangladesh - Senior Research Officer (Equivalent to assistant professor) and Research Officer, Department of Pharmacology, (1997–2005)
- Research Fellow of International Program in the Chemical Sciences (IPICS), Sweden in the same Department (1993–1997), Northern University, Dhanmondi, Dhaka, Bangladesh - Part-time faculty, MPH Program (2005–2006)
- University of Paris, France - Visiting scientist in the Laboratory de Physiopathologie de la Nutrition, University of Paris, CNRS URA 0307, Paris 7, 2 Place Jussieu, 75251 Paris Cedex 05, France under a Fellowship Program of International Program in the Chemical Sciences (IPICS) (February 1999 to October 1999).
- University of Ulster, UK - Research student in the Diabetes Research Laboratory, Biomedical Sciences, University of Ulster, UK under a Fellowship Program of International Program in the Chemical Sciences (IPICS) (2001–2003)

=== Current research activities ===
Hannan's research activities include:

1. Effect of plant fractions on insulin secretion in perfused rat pancreas and isolated islets.
2. Effect of antidiabetic plant materials on carbohydrate digestion and absorption in the gut of rats.
3. Studies on fish oils for the management of insulin resistance, dyslipidemia and platelet aggregation associated with type 2 diabetes.
4. Biochemical feature of Bangladeshi Young Diabetic subjects.
5. Glycemic status of foods specially made for diabetic patients.

== Publications ==
Hannan published a textbook on pharmaceutical statistics:

- Hannan, J. M. A. (2007). Medical & Pharmaceutical Statistics. Dhaka: Sangbed Publishers. p. 328.

His three most cited papers (>200 times) are:

- Hannan, J. M. A.; Ali, L.; Rokeya, B.; Khaleque, J.; et al. (March 2007). "Soluble dietary fibre fraction of Trigonella foenum-graecum (fenugreek) seed improves glucose homeostasis in animal models of type 1 and type 2 diabetes by delaying carbohydrate digestion and absorption, and enhancing insulin action". British Journal of Nutrition. 97 (3): 514–521. doi:10.1017/S0007114507657869.
- Hannan, J.M.A.; Rokeya, B.; Faruque, O.; Nahar, N.; et al. (September 2003). "Effect of soluble dietary fibre fraction of Trigonella foenum graecum on glycemic, insulinemic, lipidemic and platelet aggregation status of Type 2 diabetic model rats". Journal of Ethnopharmacology. 88 (1): 73–77. doi:10.1016/S0378-8741(03)00190-9.
- Hannan, J M A; Marenah, L; Ali, L; Rokeya, B; et al. (April 2006). "Ocimum sanctum leaf extracts stimulate insulin secretion from perfused pancreas, isolated islets and clonal pancreatic β-cells". Journal of Endocrinology. 189 (1): 127–136. doi:10.1677/joe.1.06615. ISSN 0022-0795.
