= Melandaha Upazila =

Melandaha মেলান্দহ
- Upazila
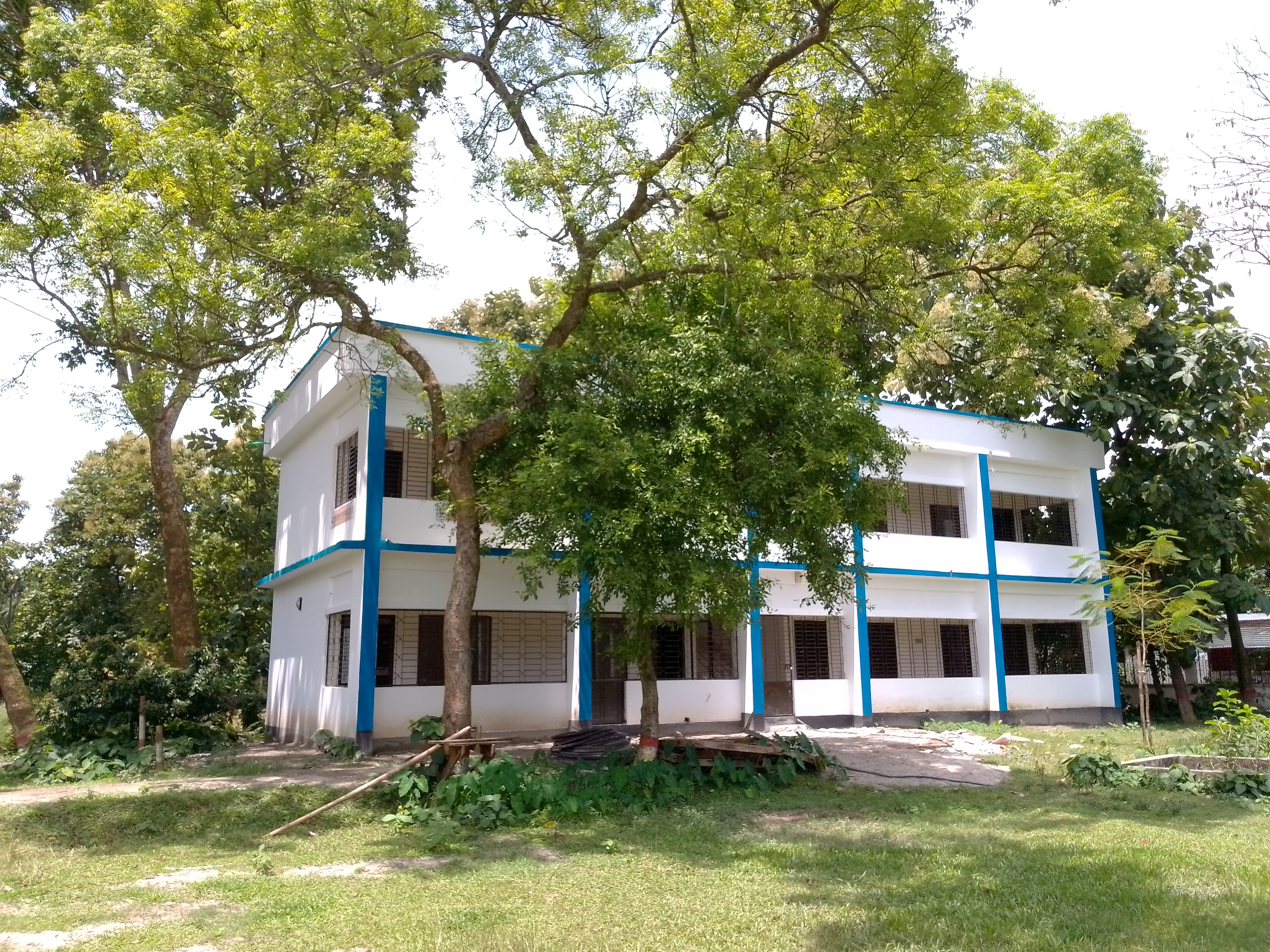
- Jamalpur Science and Technology University

- Coordinates: 24°58′N 89°50′E
- Country: Bangladesh
- Division: Mymensingh Division
- District: Jamalpur District
- Headquarters: Melandaha

Area
  - Total: 258.32 km^{2} (99.74 sq mi)

Population (2022)
  - Total: 354,521
  - Density: 1,372.4/km^{2} (3,554.5/sq mi)
- Time zone: UTC+6 (BST)
- Postal code: 2010
- Website: jamalpur.gov.bd

Melandaha Upazila mauza geocode map

Melandaha (Bengali: মেলান্দহ) is an upazila of Jamalpur District in the Division of Mymensingh, Bangladesh.

== Geography ==
Melandaha is located at 24°58'55.5"N 89°49'40.7"E. It has 79,390 households and total area 258.32 km^{2}. It is bounded by Islampur upazila on the north, Jamalpur Sadar upazila and Sherpur district to the east, and Madarganj upazila on the west.

== Points of interest ==
- Gandhi Ashram and Freedom Struggle Museum
- Shah Kamal Mazar Sharif, Durmot
- Nangla Big Canal Bridge (Nangla Boro Khal Bridge)

== Administration ==
Melandaha Thana was formed on 21 May 1925 and it was turned into an upazila on 15 April in 1983.

Melandaha Upazila is divided into Melandaha Municipality and 11 union parishads: Nangla Union Union Adra, Char Banipakuri, Durmut Union, Fulkocha, Ghuserpara, Jhaughara, Kulia, Mahmudpur, Nayanagar, and Shuampur. The union parishads are subdivided into 132 mauzas and 199 villages.

== Demographics ==
Historical population
Year	Pop.	±%
1981	205,478	—
1991	262,478	+27.7%
2001	292,347	+11.4%
2011	313,182	+7.1%
2022	354,521	+13.2%
Source: Bangladesh Bureau of Statistics

Religions in Melandaha Upazila (2022)
Religion	Percent
Islam	98.84%
Hinduism	1.16%

According to the 2022 Bangladeshi census, Melandaha Upazila had 91,615 households and a population of 354,521. 9.54% of the population were under 5 years of age. Melandaha had a literacy rate (age 7 and over) of 59.25%: 62.30% for males and 56.44% for females, and a sex ratio of 93.82 males for 100 females. 61,552 (17.36%) lived in urban areas.

== Education ==
Melandaha Umir Uddin Pilot High School (MUUPHS), a traditional and ancient British-era school in Melandaha Upazila and the best educational institution in Jamalpur district. There are 8 colleges in the upazila. They include Jahanara Latif Mohila College, Hazrabari Sirajul Haque Degree College (founded in 1976), and Melandaha Government College (1972). Sheikh Fazilatunnesa Mujib Fisheries College is being converted into Jamalpur Science & Technology University.

The madrasa education system includes three Fazil and one Kamil madrasas.

== Sports ==
There are several sports clubs and organizations in the upazila that encourage local sports development and engage youth in various physical activities. Notable organizations include:

- Nangla Rangers Group (NRG): A well-known local youth organization based in Nangla Union. It plays a significant role in organizing regional tournaments for sports like cricket, football, volleyball, and badminton, while actively working to combat substance abuse and mobile addiction among local youth.
- Melandaha Football Academy: A grassroots sports academy dedicated to training and developing young athletic talents in football within the Melandaha region.
- Melandaha Cricket Academy: Another leading sports training facility in Melandaha Sadar that nurtures young cricketers under professional guidance to develop sportsmanship at a competitive level.

== See also ==
- Upazilas of Bangladesh
- Districts of Bangladesh
- Divisions of Bangladesh
