= Imran Rahman =

Bangladeshi Academic and Singer

- ইমরান রহমান
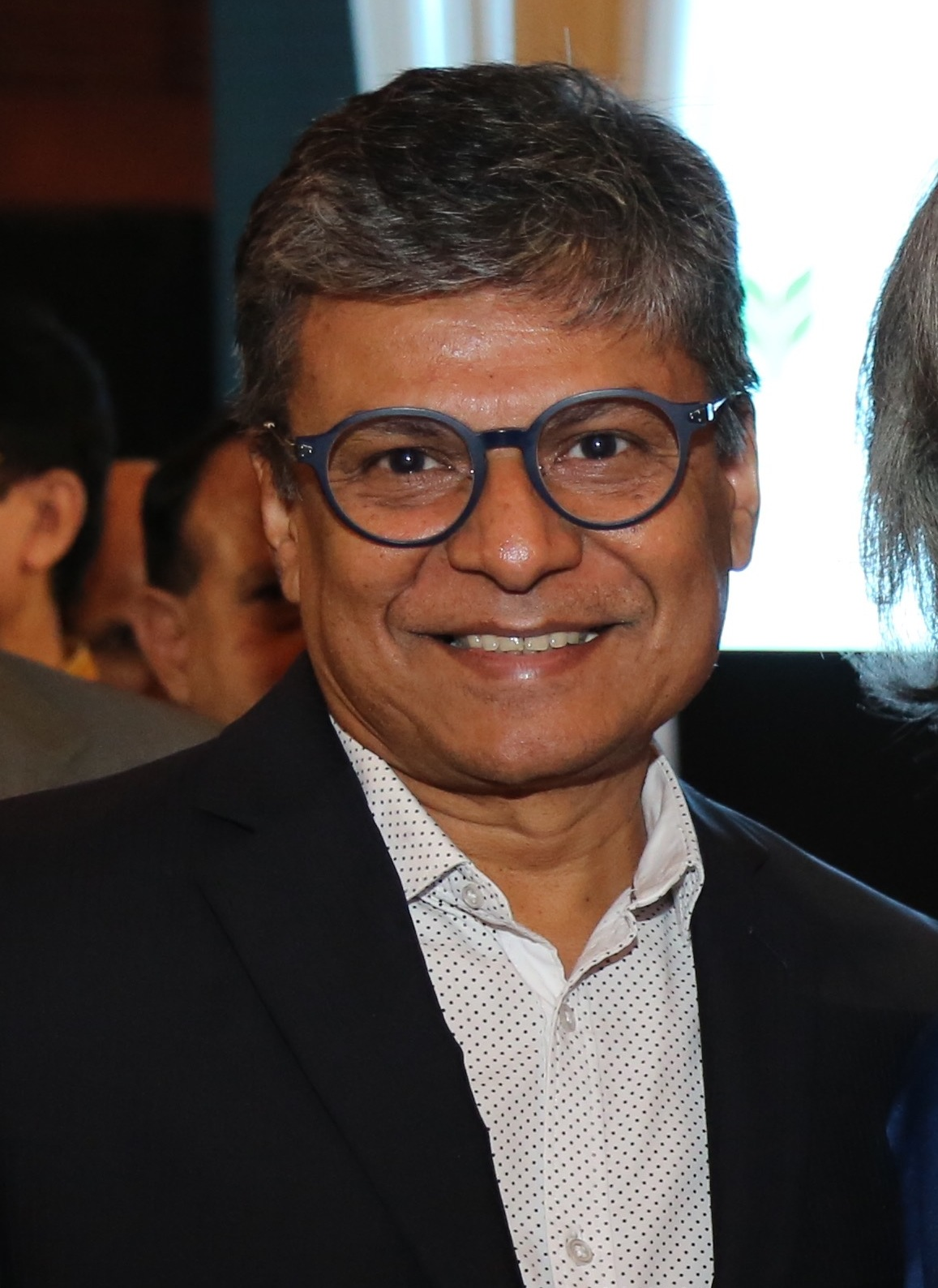
- Rahman in 2018

Vice-Chancellor of the University of Liberal Arts Bangladesh
- Incumbent
- Assumed office 2 November 2021
- Preceded by: HM Jahirul Haque
- In office 2012–2016

Personal details
- Born: 22 February 1957 (age 69) Dhaka, East Pakistan, Pakistan
- Spouse: Humaira Khan
- Children: 2
- Occupation: Professor, singer, guitarist

Imran Rahman (born 22 February 1957) is a Bangladeshi academic who began serving a second term as vice-chancellor of the University of Liberal Arts Bangladesh (ULAB) in 2021. He spent 28 years at Institute of Business Administration (IBA) as a faculty member in the department of finance, chairman of the BBA Program, and chairman of the IBA Computer Center before joining ULAB as the director of the School of Business in 2006. He became pro-vice-chancellor of the university during 2009–2012, and was vice-chancellor during 2012–2016.He is currently serving as the dean of School of Business and Entrepreneurship and administrative policy advisor at Independent University, Bangladesh

Rahman was a vocalist and guitarist of Bangladeshi band Renaissance.

== Education ==
Imran Rahman did his O level from St. Joseph Higher Secondary School, Dhaka, and A level from Putney College for Further Education in England. He graduated from the London School of Economics and Political Science with a degree in mathematical economics and econometrics. He obtained an MBA from Dhaka University's IBA. He was a Commonwealth Scholar and doctoral researcher at Manchester Business School, University of Manchester, England.

== Career ==
Imran Rahman co-founded a merchant bank in 1990 and managed it for 6 years as its director. He spent 28 years at Institute of Business Administration as a faculty member in the department of finance, chairman of the BBA program, and chairman of the IBA Computer Center. In 2006, he moved to the University of Liberal Arts Bangladesh (ULAB) as the director of its School of Business. He was the pro-vice-chancellor of the university from 2009 to 2012 and served as the vice-chancellor from 2012 to 2016. He became the vice-chancellor of ULAB again in 2021.

== Music ==
Rahman grew up in a cultural environment. His aunt, Laila Arjuman Banu, and his mother, Maleka Parveen Banu were the first female singers of Radio Pakistan in Dhaka. Rahman joined the Bangladeshi band Renaissance in the late 1990s. His song, "Koto je Kotha", was recorded in 2004.
