= Bangladesh Computer Society =

Group in Bangladesh

- বাংলাদেশ কম্পিউটার সোসাইটি
- Seal of Bangladesh Computer Society
- Abbreviation: BCS
- Formation: 1979
- Founded at: Dhaka
- Type: Professional society
- Location: Dhaka, Bangladesh
- Coordinates: 22.8084°N 89.5562°E
- President: Mohammad Shamsul Arefin
- Secretary General: Alin Boby
- Vice President: Rezaul Karim, Md. Abdul Based, Zainal Abedin
- Joint Secretary: Shariful Anwar, Md. Zarafat Islam, Md. Nazmul Huda Masud
- Website: bcsbd.org.bd

The Bangladesh Computer Society (BCS) is regarded as the leading professional and learned society in the field of computers and information systems in Bangladesh. It was established in 1979. This is also a sister society of IEEE Computer Society.

== Membership ==
Five categories of membership to the Society.

- Student member
- Graduate member
- Associate member
- Member
- Fellow

BCS Professional Membership is an industry benchmark. Its membership grades begin with Student and Graduate, then move to professional grades with Associate, Member and onto Fellow for highly qualified and experienced practitioners.

BCS and ISEB qualifications help to broaden the knowledge and skills sets of IT professionals.

- Networking
- Member discounts
- Publications
- Knowledge services
- Training & development

== Affiliations ==
- American Association for the Advancement of Science (AAAS)
- American Automatic Control Council (AACC)
- Bangladesh Young Tourist Club (YTC)
- Bangladesh Computer Samity (BCS)
- Bangladesh Medical Association (BMA)
- Computer Training Institute (CTI)
