= Kaliakair =

City in Gazipur District, Dhaka Division

Kaliakair কালিয়াকৈর
- City
- Location in Dhaka division Location in Bangladesh
- Coordinates: 24.078°N 90.210°E
- Country: Bangladesh
- Division: Dhaka
- District: Gazipur
- Upazila: Kaliakair
- Municipality: 2001

Government
  - Type: Mayor–Council
  - Body: Kaliakair Municipality
  - Paura Mayor: Md. Majibur Rahman

Area
  - Total: 27.16 km^{2} (10.49 sq mi)

Population (2022)
  - Total: 249,111
  - Density: 9,172/km^{2} (23,760/sq mi)
  - Rank: 26th
- Time zone: UTC+6 (Bangladesh Time)
- National Dialing Code: +880

Kaliakair Municipality mahallah geocode map

Kaliakair (Bengali: কালিয়াকৈর) is a city in central Bangladesh, located in Gazipur District in the division of Dhaka. It is the administrative and urban centre of Kaliakair Upazila. About 250,000 people live here which makes this city the 16th largest city in Bangladesh.

== Etymology ==
There is a popular belief that there was a big snake named Kalla Nag in a pond which is called pukur or pukair in Bengali. In course of time the name Kalla had changed as Kalia and Pukair had changed to Kair due to phonetic transformation. Thus the name Kaliakair was founded.

== Geography ==
Kaliakair city is located at 24.201144°N 90.484296°E in the Gazipur District of central region of Bangladesh.

== Demographics ==
Religions in Kaliakair (2022)
Religion	Percent
Islam	91.25%
Hinduism	8.40%
Other or not stated	0.35%

As of the 2022 Census of Bangladesh, Kaliakair had 83,945 households and a population of 249,111. 13.84% of the population were under 10 years of age. Kaliakair had a sex ratio of 111.48 males per 100 females and a literacy rate of 85.50%.

== Administration ==
Kaliakair city is governed by a Paurashava named Kaliakair municipality which consists of 9 wards and 18 mahallas, which occupies an area of 24.66 km^{2}. Besides, there are 3 adjoining 3 other mauzas as the other urban areas which all together constitutes a total area of 27.16 km^{2}.
