= University of Frontier Technology, Bangladesh =

Public University in Gazipur, Bangladesh

Coordinates: 24.0651°N 90.2228°E

- ইউনিভার্সিটি অব ফ্রন্টিয়ার টেকনোলজি, বাংলাদেশ
- Former names: Bangabandhu Sheikh Mujibur Rahman Digital University, Bangladesh; Gazipur Digital University
- Type: Public
- Established: June 12, 2018
- Accreditation: University Grants Commission
- Chancellor: President Mirza Fakhrul Islam Alamgir
- Vice-Chancellor: Prof Dr. Md. Moktar Ali
- Academic staff: 43
- Administrative staff: 35
- Total staff: 50
- Students: 732
- Location: old highway, Kaliakair, Gazipur, Bangladesh
- Campus: 50 acres (20 ha) (proposed); Suburban
- Website: uftb.ac.bd

University of Frontier Technology, Bangladesh is Bangladeshi specialized government university. It was established in 2016 and started the admission process in 2018. It is situated in Kaliakair, Gazipur, Dhaka.

== History ==
On 26 July 2016, the government of Bangladesh enacted a regulation in the National Assembly to set up the university on a 50-acre site adjoining to Kaliakoir Hi–Tech Park in Kaliakair, Gazipur District.

Instruction began with the 2018–2019 academic year, for which 100 students were offered admission.

After the fall of the Sheikh Hasina-led Awami League government, on February 13, 2025, the interim government of Bangladesh issued an ordinance naming the university from Bangabandhu Sheikh Mujibur Rahman Digital University to Gazipur Digital University, although the students of this university have protested to name it as Bangladesh Digital University. On 24 February 2025, students of the university blocked the Dhaka-Gazipur rail track, demanding the institution be renamed Bangladesh Digital University. On 1 September 2025, it was again renamed to University of Frontier Technology, Bangladesh.

== Academic ==
=== Faculties ===
Faculty of Cyber Physical System Engineering

- Department of Internet of Things and Robotics Engineering (IRE)

Faculty of Digital Transformation Engineering

- Department of Educational Technology and Engineering (EDTE)
- Department of General Education

Faculty of Software and Machine Intelligence Engineering

- Department of Software Engineering (SWE)
- Department of Data Science and Engineering (DSE)

Faculty of Security and Communication Engineering

- Department of Cyber Security Engineering (CySE)

Students
Depertment	Number of Freshman per Year
Internet of Things and Robotics Engineering	50
Educational Technology and Engineering	50
Software Engineering	40
Data Science and Engineering	40
Cyber Security Engineering	40
Total	220

=== Institute ===
- Institute for Online and Distance Learning (IODL)
- Institute for Continuing Education and Soft-skills Development (ICESD)

=== Centers and Cells ===
- The National and International Collaboration Cell (NICC)
- UFTB Career Center (UCC)
- Institutional Quality Assurance Cell (IQAC)

== list of Vice Chancellors ==
List of VC
No.	Name	Term of Office
1	Professor Dr. Munaz Ahmed Noor	12 June 2018 - 11 June 2022
2	Professor Dr. Mohammad Mahfuzul Islam	20 November 2022 - 14 September 2024
3	Professor Dr. Mohammad Abu Yousuf	23 October 2024 - 27 July 2026
4	Professor Dr. Md. Moktar Ali	28 July 2026 - Present

== See also ==
- List of universities in Bangladesh
- Bangladesh Maritime University
- Aviation and Aerospace University, Bangladesh
- Education in Bangladesh
