= Nangla, Bangladesh =

Village in Jamalpur District, Bangladesh

Nangla is a village in Bangladesh. It is located in Nangla Union of Melandaha Upazila, Jamalpur District.
