= Syed Manzoorul Islam =

Bangladeshi literary critic (1951–2025)

- সৈয়দ মনজুরুল ইসলাম
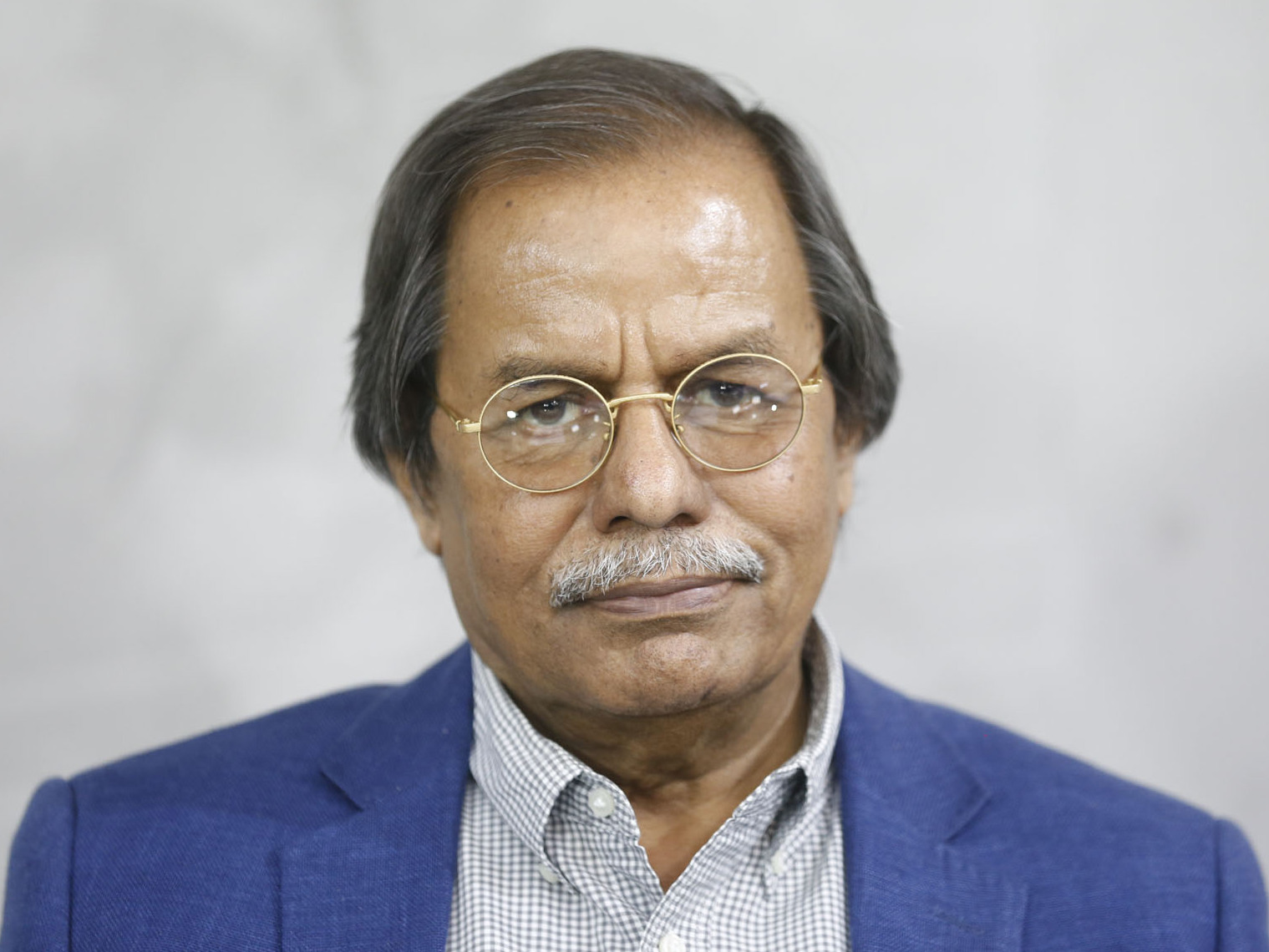
- Islam in 2019
- Born: 18 January 1951; Sylhet, East Bengal, Pakistan
- Died: 10 October 2025 (aged 74); Dhaka, Bangladesh
- Education: University of Dhaka; Queen's University at Kingston
- Occupation: Professor; writer
- Awards: Ekushey Padak; Bangla Academy Literary Award

Syed Manzoorul Islam (18 January 1951 – 10 October 2025) was a Bangladeshi critic, writer, and a professor at the University of Dhaka. As a literary critic, he wrote criticism on writers including Michael Madhusudan Dutt, Kazi Nazrul Islam, Sudhindranath Dutta, Samar Sen, and Shamsur Rahman. He became the president of PEN Bangladesh in January 2018.

Islam won Ekushey Padak in 2018 in the language and literature category. Earlier, he received a Bangla Academy Literary Award in 1996, and his 2005 short stories collection Prem o Prarthanar Galpo was Prothom Alo's book of the year.

== Early Life and Career ==
Islam was born in Sylhet to Syed Amirul Islam and Rabeya Khatun. He passed the entrance examination from Sylhet Government Pilot High School in 1966 and Intermediate examination from Sylhet MC College in 1968. He received his graduate and post-graduate degree from the University of Dhaka respectively in 1971 and 1972. Later he went to Canada and earned a PhD from Queen's University at Kingston in 1981 for his thesis on the influence of Emanuel Swedenborg's philosophy in the poetry of W. B. Yeats. In 1989, he went to the University of Southern Mississippi at Hattiesburg as a Fulbright Scholar and taught there one semester. He retired from the faculty position at the University of Dhaka and joined University of Liberal Arts Bangladesh.

Islam died from complications of a heart attack on 10 October 2025, at the age of 74.

== Literary Writings ==
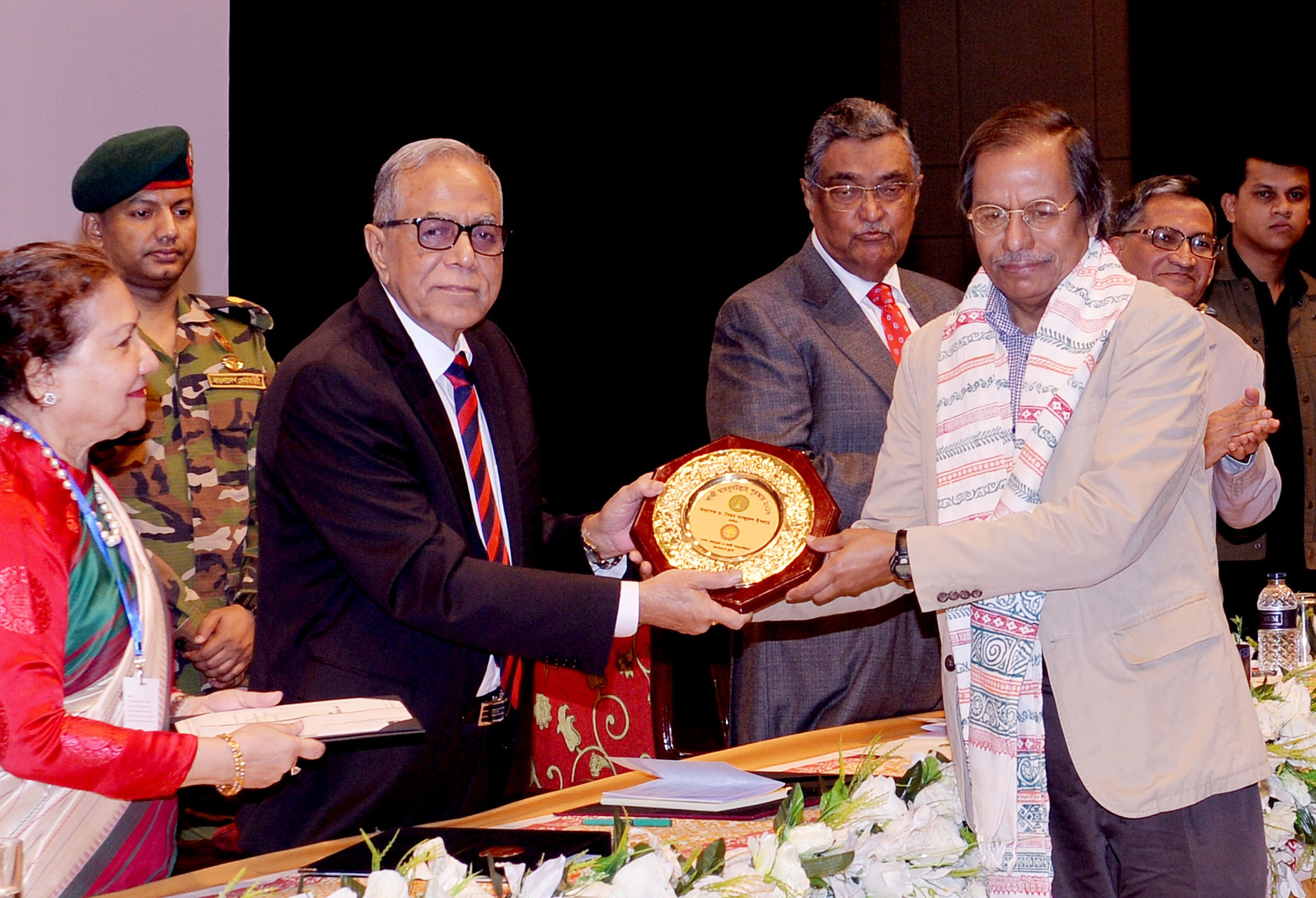
Islam receives Shilpakala Padak from President Abdul Hamid in 2017.

Islam used to write from his childhood. While reading in class six, he published his writing in a magazine, Shikkhok Samachar. During his university days as a student, his friend's father fell sick and died in pain. This emotionally affected Islam and led him to write his first story, "Bishal Mrittu" in 1973. It received a positive response; but he abstained from publishing anything during his days in Canada. On his return to Bangladesh, he returned to writing and began contributing a regular column "Olosh Diner Hawa" in the literary section of the Dainik Sangbad. He wrote on issues including art and literature. In 1989, Islam started writing for the magazine Bichinta, which published many of his post-modern stories.

Islam described himself as "a critic by training and a writer by compulsion". Though he wrote in many genres, he himself valued his fictional work more than his other writings. In his stories, he usually incorporated his own experiences. He tried to live the life of his characters, seeing the world through their eyes and describing their pain and happiness. Of the surrealistic nature in his writing, he said that in his childhood he used to listen to fairy-tales in which surrealistic elements were an integral part and that gave his writing a similar texture. He believed that "the surreal is the flip side of reality - it is what gives meaning to our everydayness".

== Bibliography ==
Collections of Short stories

- Shrestho Golpo (1994)
- Thaka na-thakar Golpo (1996)
- Kach Bhanga Rater Golpo (1998)
- Alo O Ondhokar Dekhar Golpo (2001)
- Prem O Prarthonar Golpo (2005)
- Shukhdukkher Galpo (2011)
- Bela Obelar Galpo (2012)
- The Merman's Prayer and Other Stories (in English) (2013)

Novels

- Adhakhana Manush (2006)
- Tin Parber Jiban (2008)
- Kanagalir Manushera (2009)
- Ajgubi Rat (2010)
- Dinratriguli (2013)

Essays

- Nandantattwa (1985)
- Katipaya Prabandha (1992)
- Essays on Ekushey: The Language Movement 1952 (in Bengali). Dhaka: Bangla Academy. 1994. ISBN 984-07-2968-3.
- Rabindranther Jyamiti o Anyanya Shilpaprashanga (2011)
- Olosh Diner Haowa (2012)
