= University of Liberal Arts Bangladesh =

Private university in Bangladesh

University of Liberal Arts Bangladesh ‍ইউনিভার্সিটি অব লিবারেল আর্টস বাংলাদেশ
- Motto: "A new vision in higher education"
- Type: Private
- Established: 2002; Opened: 1 October 2004
- Chancellor: President Mirza Fakhrul Islam Alamgir
- Vice-Chancellor: Shamsad Mortuza
- Students: 4,500 as of Spring 2024
- Location: 688 Beribadh Road, Mohammadpur, Dhaka, 1207, Bangladesh; 23.7411°N 90.3744°E
- Campus: Urban
- Colors: Blue and Gold
- Website: ulab.edu.bd

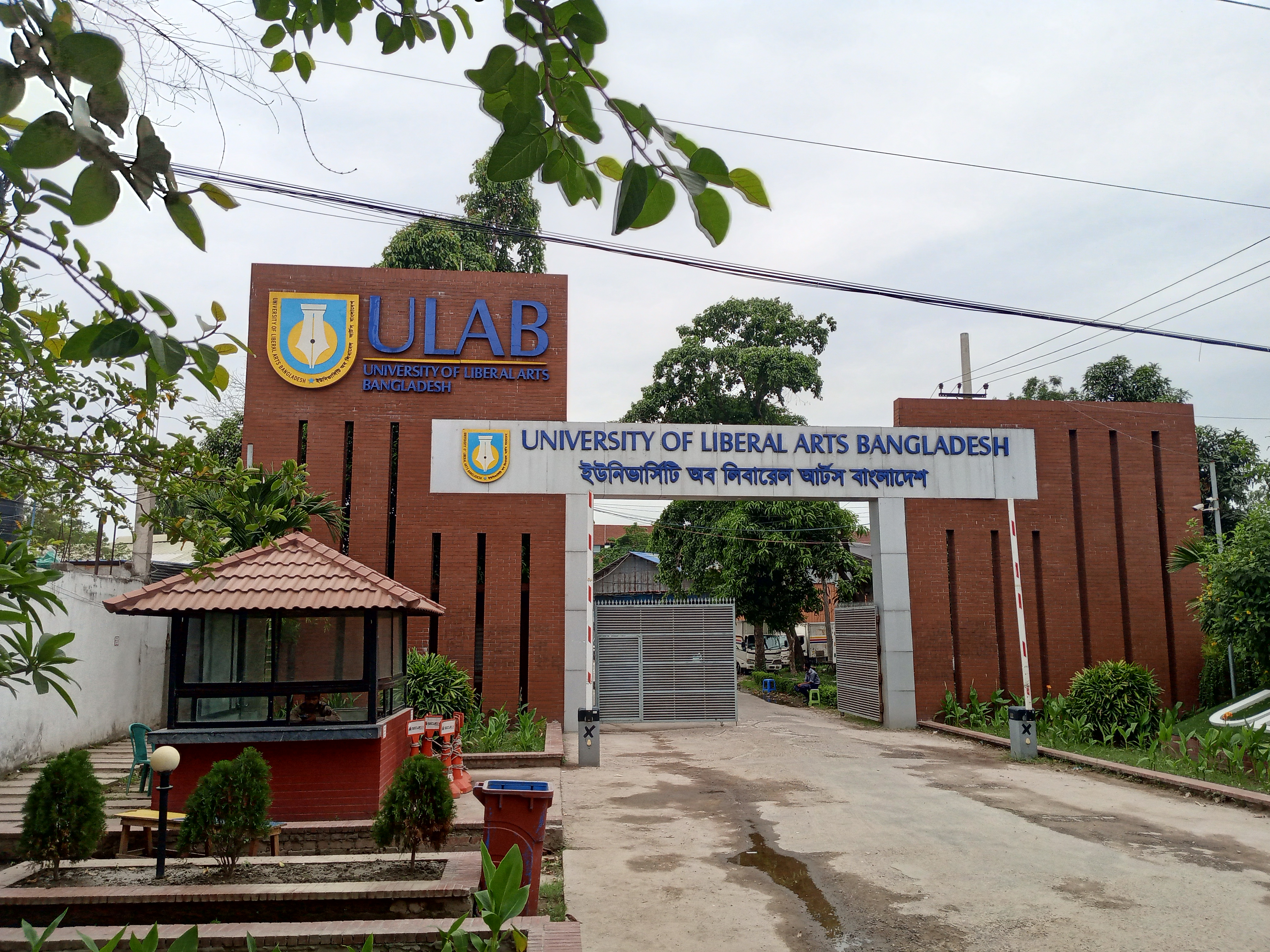
Main gate of University of Liberal Arts Bangladesh

ULAB Permanent Campus Lawn

ULAB Permanent Campus Walkway and Field

University rankings

Regional – Overall
- QS Asia: 1001-1100 (2026)

University of Liberal Arts Bangladesh (Bengali: ইউনিভার্সিটি অব লিবারেল আর্টস বাংলাদেশ) (ULAB) is a private liberal arts-based university in Mohammadpur, Dhaka, Bangladesh. Founded in February 2002, permission to open was received from the University Grants Commission (UGC) of Bangladesh in November 2003, pursuant to the Private University Act, 1992.

ULAB incorporates the values of liberal arts and sustainability into its curricula, through its General Education Department and its Center for Sustainable Development (CSD). ULAB is a research-intensive university, with multiple research opportunities for its faculty members and students.

== Campus ==
The university's campus is located in Mohammadpur in Dhaka. It is one of the largest private universities in Bangladesh. The foundation of the campus was laid in February 2002. Classes started in the permanent campus from 1 October 2004. It contains 4 buildings with a research building in Dhanmondi, a stadium standard field, and 3 academic buildings (A, C and D).

== Administration ==
There is a separate admin building dedicated to administration activities.

=== List of vice-chancellors ===
- Kazi Shahid Ahmed (2005 – 2007)
- Rafiqul Islam (2007 – 2011)
- Imran Rahman (2011 – May 2017)
- HM Jahirul Haque (2017 – 2021)
- Imran Rahman (2 November 2021 – 01 November 2025)
- Shamsad Mortuza (22 February 2026 – Present)

=== Pro vice-chancellors ===
- Imran Rahman (2009–2012)
- Jude William R. Genilo (2023-)

=== School of Business ===
- Sarwar Uddin Ahmed (Head)

==== Bachelor of Business Administration ====
- Muhammad Faisol Chowdhury (Director)

==== Graduate Business Programs ====
- Asif Uddin Ahmed (Director)

=== School of Science and Engineering ===
- M. Mofazzal Hossain (Dean)

==== Department of Electrical and Electronic Engineering ====
- M. Mofazzal Hossain (Head)

==== Department of Computer Science and Engineering ====
- Muhammad Golam Kibria (Head)

=== School of Social Sciences ===
- Jude William R. Genilo (Dean)

==== Media Studies and Journalism ====
- Jude William R. Genilo (Head)

=== School of Arts and Humanities ===
- Kaiser Hamidul Haq (Dean)

==== Department of English Humanities ====
- Arifa Ghani Rahman (Head)

==== Department of Bangla Language and Literature ====
- Sadia Afrin Anni (Head)

==== General Education Program ====
- Shahnaj Husne Jahan

== Academic departments ==
In February 2023, ULAB established two new departments, the Bangla Department and the Literature Department. The university is the first institute of higher education in Bangladesh to teach ethnic minority languages, of which Bangladesh has 44 according to Shameem Reza.

ULAB offers degree programs in the following schools:

=== School of Arts and Humanities ===
- Bachelor of Arts, English, and Humanities
- Bachelor of Arts in Bangla Language and Literature
- Master of Arts in English

=== School of Social Science ===
==== Bachelor of Social Science, Media Studies and Journalism (Honors) ====
Department of Media Studies and Journalism established at 2004. The head of the department is Jude William Genilo. MSJ is the flagship department of ULAB, with course of 129 credit, the department also offer apprentice program to learn practically, such as PR4U, ULAB TV, The ULABian, AxisMIL, RadioCamBuzz, ShutterBugs, Dhaka International Mobile Film Festival, and Cinemascope. The department offer Bachelor in Media Studies and Journalism, and Masters in Communicantion.

=== School of Business ===
- Bachelor in Business Administration (Honors)
- Master of Business Administration (MBA)
- Executive Master of Business Administration (EMBA)

=== School of Science and Engineering ===
- Bachelor of Science in Computer Science and Engineering (Honors)
- Bachelor of Science in Electronics and Telecommunication Engineering (Honors)
- Bachelor of Science in Electrical and Electronic Engineering (Honors)

ULAB has one non-degree-granting program, which runs the required courses to fulfill a liberal arts curriculum:

- General Education Program (GED)

== Research institutes ==
ULAB has nine centers that conduct research, run workshops and conferences; promote knowledge creation, and advocate best practices.

=== Center for Sustainable Development (CSD) ===
The Center for Sustainable Development (CSD) was established in 2006 and is the oldest research center at the university.CSD is Bangladesh's only research institute dedicated solely to the Sustainable Development.

=== Center for Enterprise and Society (CES) ===
CES is Bangladesh's first university-based research center dedicated to entrepreneurship and business research with an emphasis on ethical, environmental, and social sustainability.

=== Center for Critical and Qualitative Studies ===
Center for Critical and Qualitative Studies (CQS) is a research center jointly operated by University of Liberal Arts Bangladesh and University of Sussex, UK.

=== Center for Advanced Theory (CAT) ===
The programs has three levels of activity: sponsoring research, providing advanced education (through workshops, seminars, public lectures, and colloquiums), and editing research publications (monographs, occasional articles, journals, and bulletins). Salimullah Khan is the director of CAT.

== Library ==
In 2004, the Library was launched at 116 Arjatpara, Mohakhali, Tejgaon, Dhaka-1212. In 2006, the University of Liberal Arts Bangladesh and the Central Library were moved to its own campus at House 56, Road 4/A, Dhanmondi, Dhaka-1209. Since 2022, Library is functioning from the ULAB Main Campus at 688 Beribadh Road on the A Building of the campus. ULAB Library is enriched with various types of resources that includes Textbooks, Reference Books, Special & Rare Books, e-Books, Periodicals, National and International Journals & Magazines (print & online), Reports, Newspapers (national & international), Audio-Visual Materials, and Maps & Atlas, etc. Besides, ULAB Library is a member of a variety of Online Archives & Databases. Library Resources are kept on the shelf following the internationally recognized Classification System 'DDC scheme' (Dewey Decimal Classification).

== Publications ==
- ULAB Press
- The ULABian, a Student Newspaper
- Muse, a newsletter of ULABian
- CinePedia, a semester based film magazine of CinemaScope

== Notable people ==
=== Faculty ===
- Rafiqul Islam
- Kaiser Haq
- Salimullah Khan
- Muhammad Ibrahim
- Imran Rahman
- Azfar Hussain, scholar-in-residence, 2016 and 2017
- Mohit Ul Alam, until 2014
- Abdul Mannan
- Syed Manzoorul Islam
- Firoz Mahmud, visual artist and educator, until 2016
- Tahsan, Tahsan Rahman Khan, singer and educator, until 2013

=== Alumni ===
- Bappy Chowdhury, actor, nominated awardee Meril Prothom Alo Awards
- Konal, singer who won the reality show Channel I Shera Kontho reality show in 2009
- Mashiat Rahman, actress
- Masha Islam, multilingual singer
