= Mahmud Manjur =

Bangladeshi lyricist, journalist, cultural critic and author (born 1981)

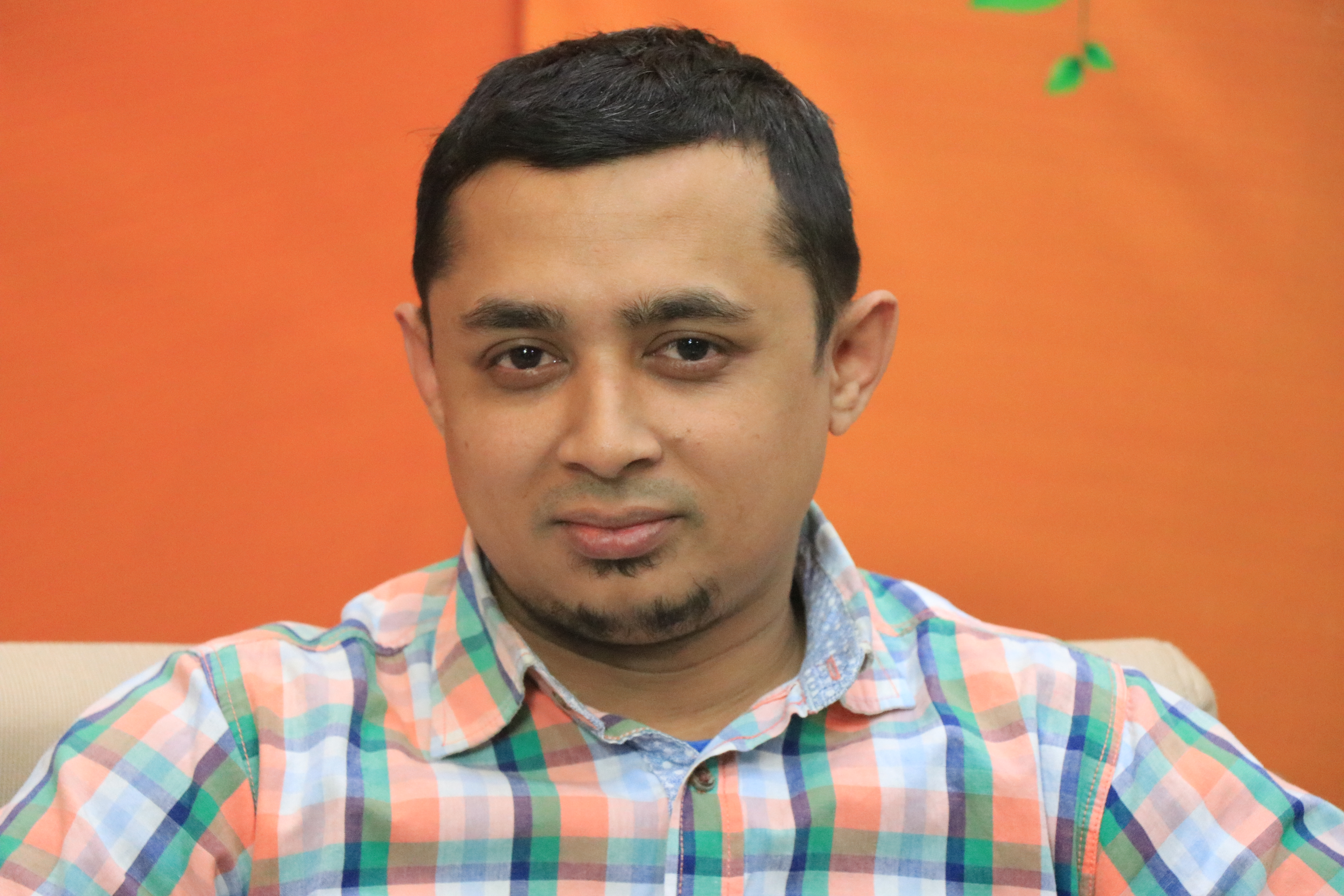
- Born: 15 June 1981 (age 44); Lakshmipur, Bangladesh
- Occupations: Lyricist, journalist, author, cultural critic
- Years active: 2000–present
- Employer(s): Bangla Tribune (Arts & Entertainment Editor since 2015)
- Notable work: Geetijibon (book), songs for films/TV/albums
- Awards: CJFB Critic's-Choice Lyricist of the Year (2023), 71 Media Iconic Award – Best Entertainment Journalist (2025), multiple lyricist awards (2025)

Mahmud Manjur (born 15 June 1981) is a Bangladeshi lyricist, journalist, cultural critic, and author. He is known for his long career in entertainment journalism and for writing songs for television dramas, films, albums, and independent productions. He is also the author of the book Geetijibon (2025), which documents the lives of prominent Bangla lyricists. He stands out as a figure who bridges journalism and creative songwriting, a combination that allows him to influence both media coverage and cultural production in Bangladesh. Through his editorial work, he has shaped coverage of arts, film, and music. As a lyricist, he has enriched Bangla music with songs across multiple media formats. He was awarded by Bangladesh Cultural Reporters Association as special contribution to entertainment and cultural journalism and Best Lyricist by Cultural Journalists Forum Bangladesh (CJFB).

== Early life and background ==
Manjur was born on 15 June 1981 in Lakshmipur District, Bangladesh. He showed a strong interest in writing, culture, and music from a young age. Over time, he developed himself as both a creative lyricist and a professional journalist. His early involvement in cultural activities and media work helped lay the foundation for his dual career.

== Career ==
=== Journalism career ===
Since 2015, Manjur has served as the Arts & Entertainment Editor at Bangla Tribune. Before that he has worked at leading publications including Weekly Purnima, Jugantor, Tarokalok, Bhorer Kagoj, Ajker Kagoj, and Manab Zamin. His journalism covers culture, entertainment, film, music, and human-interest stories. He has produced many feature articles, interviews, reviews, and festival reports. He has also reported from major international film festivals, including the Cannes Film Festival (2023 & 2024) and the Sundance Film Festival (2025).

Mahmud Manjur worked as a jury member at the Bogura International Film Festival in 2024. In 2025, he is serving as a jury member in the International Short Film category. He is also a jury member for the primary selection process of the New York Bangla Film Festival, which will showcase Bangladeshi films in the United States for the first time. In addition, Manjur has been selected as a jury member for the 6th Bogura International Film Festival 2026.

=== Lyric writing and musical works ===
Mahmud Manjur has written song lyrics for more than twenty years. He has contributed lyrics for over 150 songs across films, television dramas, audio albums, and independent music productions. He has written full-length albums such as Dhulor Gan, Prithibir Canvas, and Shotek Bhul. He is an enlisted lyricist of Bangladesh Television (BTV). His songs have been performed by legendary artists like Runa Laila and Kumar Bishwajit, as well as contemporary stars such as Kona, Arfin Rumi, Porshi, Pintoo Ghosh, Joy Shahriar, Imran, Kishore, Nancy, Belal Khan, Sandhi, Konal, and Rehan Rasul. Renowned Indian singer Silajit, Rupankar Bagchi has also performed his lyrics. He is a member of Lyricists' Association of Bangladesh (Geetikobi Shongho), and served as its office secretary from 2022 to 2024 and finance secretary from 2020 to 2022.

In 2025, he achieved a rare "hat-trick", receiving Best Lyricist awards from three different national organizations in the same month. The awards included the Labonno Media Award 2025, the Excellence in Success Award (for the song "Alo Alo Korecho"), and the TRAB Iconic Award 2025 (for the song "Kemon Acho Tumi"). Earlier, he won the Critic's Choice Lyricist of the Year at the CJFB Awards 2023, for his song Aponjon from the film/drama Onnoyna.

=== Book and cultural documentation ===
In November 2025, Mahmud Manjur published the book Geetijibon, a research- and interview-based collection portraying the creative journeys of twelve leading Bangladeshi lyricists. The book includes biographies and personal stories of lyricists such as Munshi Wadud, Moniruzzaman Monir, Liton Adhikari Rintu, Kabir Bakul, Zulfiqer Russell, Gazi Mazharul Anwar and others.

== Awards ==
- CJFB Best Lyricist (Popular), 2020
- CJFB Best Lyricist (Critics’ Choice), 2023
- Labonno Media Award, 2025
- Excellence in Success Award 2025
- TRAB Iconic Award 2025
- AJFB Star Award 2025
- 71 Media Iconic Awards
- BCRA Best Cultural Reporter (2010)
- Bangla Tribune Best Reporter (2017–2019)
- BCRA Award, 2007
