= Gemcon Group =

Bangladeshi diversified conglomerate

- Formation: 1979
- Headquarters: Dhaka, Bangladesh
- Region served: Bangladesh
- Official language: Bengali
- Website: gemcongroup.com

Gemcon Group (Bengali: জেমকন গ্রুপ) is a Bangladeshi diversified conglomerate based in Dhaka. Founded in 1979 by Kazi Shahid Ahmed through Castle Construction, the group has expanded across engineering, organic tea, retail, seafood, jute, media, education, real estate, and sports. It is a family-owned company; Ahmed's three sons, Kazi Anis Ahmed, Kazi Inam Ahmed, and Kazi Nabil Ahmed, serve as directors. The group employs approximately 5,000 people and operates subsidiaries including Kazi & Kazi Tea Estate (producer of Teatulia Organic Teas), the Meena Bazar supermarket chain, Dhaka Tribune, and the University of Liberal Arts Bangladesh.

== History ==
Gemcon Group was established in 1979 when Kazi Shahid Ahmed founded Castle Construction in Dhaka. Ahmed, born 7 November 1940 in Jashore, built the group into one of Bangladesh's most diversified conglomerates over four decades, expanding from civil engineering into tea, retail, media, and education. He died on 28 August 2023.

It is a family owned company; Ahmed's three sons, Kazi Anis Ahmed, Kazi Inam Ahmed, and Kazi Nabil Ahmed, are directors of the company.

Kazi Shahid Ahmed was also the founder of the University of Liberal Arts Bangladesh (ULAB), a private institution integrating liberal arts and sustainability into its curriculum, inaugurated in October 2004.

In 2000, the group established Kazi & Kazi Tea Estate in the Tetulia region of Panchagarh District — the first USDA-certified organic tea garden in Bangladesh. The estate's international brand, Teatulia Organic Teas, began exports to the United States in 2005 and is sold in the United Kingdom, Japan, China, and other international markets.

Gemcon group provides annual awards for writers and poets through the Gemcon Sahitya Puroshkar, one of Bangladesh's most significant non-government literary prizes. It began in 2000 as the Kagoj Tarun Sahitya Puraskar and was renamed the Best Book Award in 2003, before taking its current name in 2007. In monetary terms it is among the largest non-government literary awards in Bangladesh.

Gemcon Group owned Ajker Kagoj. It closed the newspaper with a one-day notice to its employees. Kazi Anis Ahmed is the publisher of Dhaka Tribune and Bangla Tribune.

In January 2020, Gemcon announced it was in talks to acquire Agora Super Stores and merge it with Meena Bazar. The merger would make Meena Bazar the biggest retail chain in Bangladesh. Gemcon Khulna won the Bangabandhu T20 Cup in December 2020, defeating Gazi Group Chattogram in the final.

During the tenure of the Awami League government, Gemcon Group was one of four companies that received a significant share of electricity pole procurement contracts under various projects of the Bangladesh Rural Electrification Board (BREB). According to an investigation by Prothom Alo, Gemcon Group received contracts worth Tk 9.01 billion, representing approximately 17 per cent of total procurement value, supplying around 300,000 poles. Kazi Nabil Ahmed, a former Awami League MP for Jashore-3, could not be reached for comment at the time of the report.

== Legal proceedings ==
In September 2025, the Anti-Corruption Commission (ACC) filed two separate cases alleging money laundering and illegally amassing wealth against Kazi Anis Ahmed, chief executive officer of Gemcon Group, and his brother Kazi Inam Ahmed, director of the group. The cases remain under investigation; no verdict has been reached. Kazi Anis Ahmed denied the allegations, stating: "We categorically deny any wrongdoing." In connection with the proceedings, the court imposed travel bans on both Kazi Anis Ahmed (November 2025) and Kazi Inam Ahmed (January 2026), and ordered the ACC to seize shares across 36 Gemcon Group companies. Gemcon Group is also among the industrial groups listed by Bangladesh Bank in its efforts to recover allegedly laundered assets through international legal firms.

== Businesses ==
Gemcon Group operates across nine sectors through a portfolio of subsidiaries and affiliated entities.

- Castle Construction
- Gemcon Limited
- Charka Steel Limited
- Kazi & Kazi Tea Estate sells Teatulia Organic Teas; the first USDA-certified organic tea in Bangladesh. The plantation is located in Panchagarh District.
- Gemcon Food & Agricultural Products Limited (Meena Bazar)
- Meena Click (an online grocery shop)
- Meena Sweets
- Gemcon City Limited
- Gem Jute
- Gemini Sea Food
- Organikare
- University of Liberal Arts Bangladesh
- Kazi Shahid Foundation
- Abahani Limited Dhaka
- Gemcon Khulna
- Meena Bazar, Super Store

== See also ==
- East Coast Group
