= Kazi Inam Ahmed =

Kazi Inam Ahmed is a Bangladeshi businessman and sports organiser. Ahmed owns Gemcon Group with his brothers, Kazi Nabil Ahmed and Kazi Anis Ahmed. He is a Director of the Bangladesh Cricket Board. He is a trustee board member of University of Liberal Arts Bangladesh. He is the chief operating officer of Meena Bazar. He is the chairman of the Cricket Committee of Dhaka Metropolis.

== Early life ==
Ahmed's father was Kazi Shahid Ahmed, founder of Gemcon Group, and his mother was Ameenah Ahmed. He played for the Nirman football team while studying in Scholastica. He did his undergraduate studies in the humanities at Wesleyan University.

== Career ==
Ahmed owns Gemcon Group with his brothers, Kazi Nabil Ahmed and Kazi Anis Ahmed.

Ahmed is a director of Gemini Sea Food Limited, Gemcon Food and Agricultural Products Limited, Gemcon City Limited, Gem Jute Limited, Gemcon Limited, Kazi & Kazi Tea Estate Limited, Charka Steel Limited, Bengal Herbal Garden Limited, 2A-Media Ltd ( Dhaka Tribune), Meena Sweets & Confectionaries (sic) Limited, Karotaya Tea Estate Limited, Rawshanpur Tea Frontier Limited, Gemcon Sea Food Limited, Gemcon Tea Estate Limited, Meena Retails Limited, and Ajker Kagoj. He is a partner of the Bangla Tribune and a trustee board member of University of Liberal Arts Bangladesh. He founded the ULAB Cricket Team.

In December 2017, Ahmed was appointed head of the Cricket Committee of Dhaka Metropolis. He was the marketing committee chief of the Bangladesh Cricket Board.

Ahmed is the treasurer of the Bangladesh Supermarket Owners Association. He is a Director of the Bangladesh Cricket Board. He is the owner and managing director of Khulna Titans.

In September 2025, the Anti-Corruption Commission (Bangladesh) decided to file cases against Kazi Inam Ahmed, director of Gemcon Group, and his brother Kazi Anis Ahmed, chief executive officer of the group, on charges of illegally amassing wealth and money laundering. Ahmed and his brothers are the founding investors in Teatulia UK Limited, a British subsidiary of their international tea brand. The Anti-Corruption Commission began an investigation into the company's funding after the fall of the Sheikh Hasina-led Awami League government. Teatulia UK's financial records indicate that the company operated with foreign investments, partly through Dubai-based Double Core General Trading LLC and Singapore-based Global Biz Import Export Pte Limited. The High Court of Justice denied an initial injunction the brothers sought to prevent the publication of potentially incriminating information, though it was later granted upon appeal.

In January 2025, Ahmed was appointed chairman of the Bangladesh Tigers committee of the Bangladesh Cricket Board. In February, a travel ban was issued on him, his brothers (including a former member of parliament from the Awami League), and his mother. Dhaka Metropolitan Senior Special Judge Zakir Hossain Galib ordered a freeze of shares of Gemcon Group, including those owned by Ahmed and his family. The same court ordered the seizure of shares owned by assets of other Awami League members of parliament.
