= Teatulia Organic Teas =

American tea company

- Industry: Tea
- Founded: 2000; 26 years ago
- Founder: Ahmed family
- Headquarters: Denver, United States

Teatulia is a privately owned tea company based in Denver, Colorado. Teatulia is named after the Tetulia region in Northern Bangladesh where the company grows and produces its teas. It is the first USDA-certified organic tea garden in Bangladesh and the first tea in the United States that is imported from Bangladesh. Kazi Anis Ahmed and his brothers Kazi Nabil Ahmed and Kazi Inam Ahmed are the founding investors of Teatulia.

== History ==
In 2000, the Ahmed family of Bangladesh purchased 2,000 acres of land in the Tetulia region, located against the Himalayas to the north and the Brahmaputra and Ganges rivers to the south. The family established the Kazi & Kazi Tea Estate, Ltd. (KKTE) to provide employment to area residents and support the local economy. Planting for the tea garden began on August 6, 2000. After several years of cultivation, Teatulia began to grow organic teas and herbs in its garden. Tea was introduced in the United States in 2005.

The tea garden's foundation is based on Japanese farmer Masanobu Fukuoka's natural farming method, where no machinery, chemicals, or artificial irrigation are used. Naturally growing plants and trees in the region, such as the neem tree (Azadirachta indica), help protect the Camellia sinensis tea plants from insects and pests. The tea is grown in Teatulia's garden in Bangladesh, handpicked by local tea pluckers, processed in onsite facilities, and then shipped to consumers.

== Corporate practices ==
=== Sustainability ===
Teatulia packages its tea in eco-canisters made from 100 percent recyclable paper. The canisters are wrapped with labels printed with water-based inks, and the tea bags are made from compostable corn silk. The outer wrapper of individually wrapped tea bags is made from compostable eucalyptus and aspen leaf. Teatulia's merchandise, including tea chests and point-of-purchase displays, is made from reclaimed pinewood damaged by the mountain pine beetle.

Teatulia's teas were certified kosher through Star-K in 2013.

In 2013, Teatulia received the Rainforest Alliance certification. In 2014, Teatulia became the first Colorado tea company certified as a B Corporation (B Corp) by B Lab, a nonprofit organization that evaluates companies against standards of social and environmental performance. Teatulia has since converted to a Public Benefit Corporation (PBC) while retaining its B Corp certification.

=== Teatulia Cooperative ===
Teatulia, known as Kazi & Kazi in Bangladesh, employs an average of 600 full-time workers and another 100 to 400 part-time workers at different times of the year. Teatulia was the first large commercial enterprise of any kind to start operating in Tetulia. The Teatulia Cooperative was established to provide education, health, and cattle-lending programs to the surrounding community.

In the cattle-lending program, local women are given cattle by the cooperative as a loan. The loan is repaid through cattle dung used as fertilizer in the garden; upon full repayment the families retain the cattle.

The cooperative also offers literacy classes taught by graduate students and opened a computer lab to provide IT education to the community. Teatulia reported that in 2013, 84 percent of male and female workers were literate, compared to less than 30 percent when the garden first opened. The cooperative also provides medical supplies and healthcare to neighboring villages and distributes sporting equipment to local schools and clubs.

== Product line ==
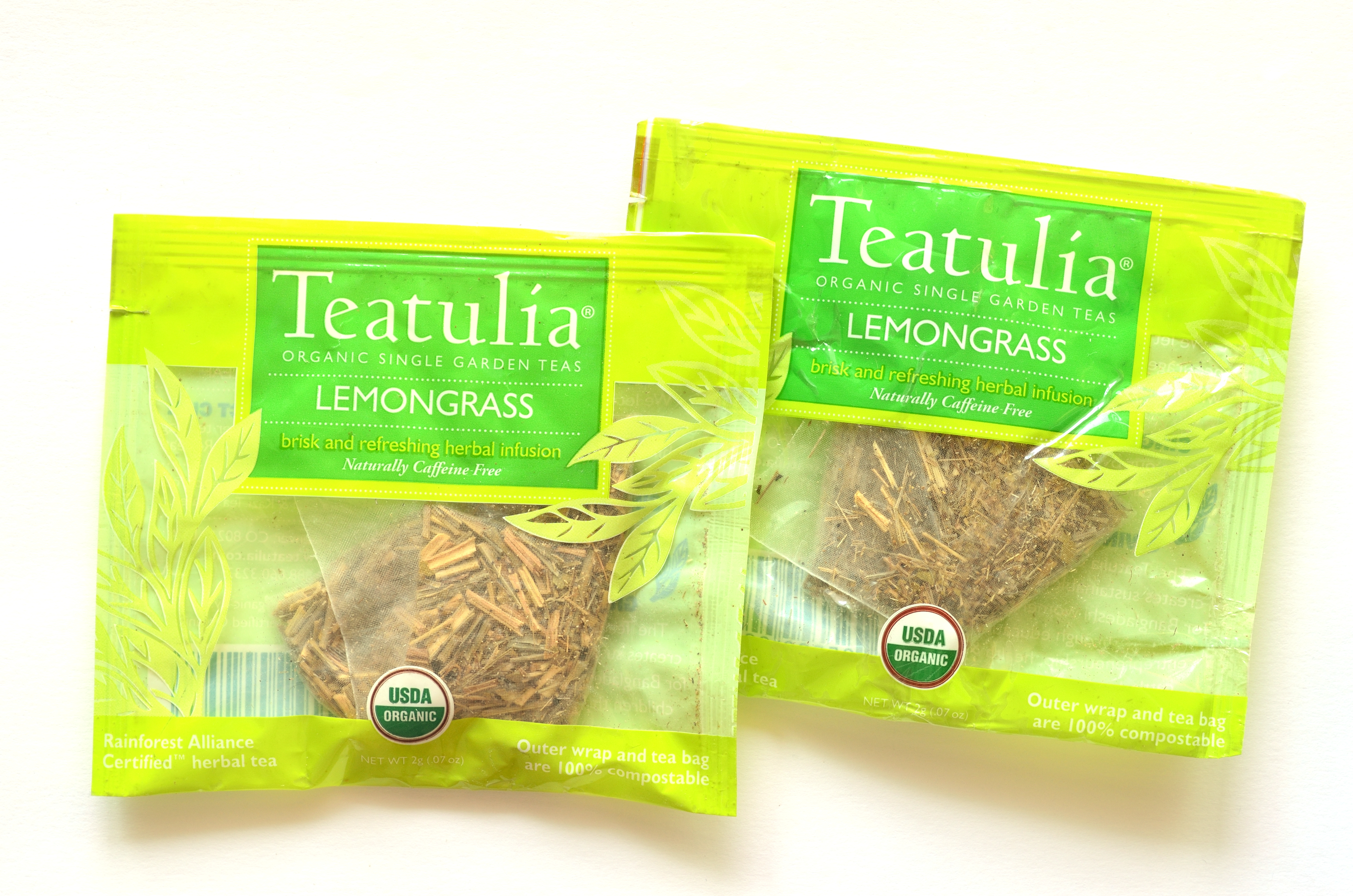
Teatulia Organic Teas

Teatulia offers whole-leaf teas in several categories: white, green, black, oolong, and herbal, as well as fine-cut, iced, and energy tea lines. All teas are sourced from the company's garden in Panchagarh District, Bangladesh, and are available as loose leaf or in pyramid tea bags.

Orthodox teas: Teatulia produces whole-leaf teas using the orthodox method of tea processing. The white, green, and black varieties all derive from the Camellia sinensis plant; differences in processing determine the final tea type.

White tea is produced from the youngest leaves and buds of the plant. The leaves are neither rolled nor fired, making white tea the least processed variety; they are instead allowed to wither and dry in a controlled environment.

Green tea is passed through a steaming treatment before rolling, which halts the oxidation process and preserves the lighter color and flavor of the leaf. Teatulia's green tea line includes two varieties: green and ginger green.

Black tea is rolled immediately after withering to initiate oxidation, then fully oxidized before drying, producing its characteristic dark color. Teatulia's black tea line includes five varieties: black, breakfast tea, Earl Grey, Neem Nectar, and Tulsi Infusion.

Oolong tea: In September 2014, Teatulia added oolong to its product line. Oolong teas are partially oxidized, with oxidation levels ranging from 8% to 80% depending on the production method; the resulting flavor profile falls between green and black tea. Oolong teas are traditionally rolled, twisted, or curled into tight balls or thin strands during processing.

Herbal teas: Teatulia's herbal infusions are blended from plants, herbs, and leaves grown in the garden rather than from the Camellia sinensis plant. Varieties include peppermint, ginger, chamomile, and lemongrass.

Fine-cut teas: In May 2013, Teatulia launched a line of fine-cut teas blending tea from its own garden with tea from other certified organic farms. The leaves are finely ground rather than kept whole. Varieties include black, Earl Grey, green, jasmine green, chamomile, and lemongrass.

Iced teas: Teatulia's iced tea line is packaged in one-ounce portion packs sized to brew one gallon. Varieties include signature black, ginger green, pomegranate green, and hibiscus berry.

Energy teas: In 2015, Teatulia introduced an energy tea line — Energy Red, Energy Black, and Energy Green — combining tea with eleuthero root (Siberian ginseng).

== Awards ==
Teatulia has received the following industry and product awards.

- 2011: Teatulia's Lemongrass Herbal Infusion was a sofiTM silver finalist for Outstanding Hot Beverage awarded by the Specialty Food Association.
- 2011: Teatulia's Lemongrass Herbal Infusion won 2nd place in the North American Tea Championship (NATC), a division of World Tea Media, for Unflavored Herbal Tea.
- 2011: Teatulia was awarded the Highest Sustainability Status from the New York International Gift Fair.
- 2012: Teatulia was honored by Naturally Boulder with the Focus on the Future Award for its practices in sustainability.
- 2012: The NATC awarded Teatulia's Lemongrass Herbal Infusion with 1st place in the Unflavored Herbal Tea category.
- 2013: Teatulia received the 1st place honor for its Hibiscus Tea at the 2013 NATC for Best Herbal Iced Tea.
- 2014: Teatulia's Black Tea won 2nd place in the North American Tea Championship (NATC), a division of World Tea Media, for Black Tea - Single Origin.
- 2014: Teatulia's Oolong won 3rd place in the North American Tea Championship (NATC), a division of World Tea Media, for Oolong Tea.
- 2014: Teatulia's White Tea won 3rd place in the North American Tea Championship (NATC), a division of World Tea Media, for White Tea.
