= Lyricists Association of Bangladesh =

Lyricists Association of Bangladesh (LAB)
- গীতিকবি সংঘ বাংলাদেশ
- Formation: July 24, 2020; 6 years ago
- Type: Lyricists organization
- Purpose: Working for the welfare of lyricists
- Headquarters: Dhaka, Bangladesh
- Official language: Bengali language
- President: Asif Iqbal
- General Secretary: Joy Shahriar
- Organizing Secretary: Sirajum Munir
- Website: lyricistsassociationbd.com

The Lyricists Association of Bangladesh (LAB) (Bengali: গীতিকবি সংঘ বাংলাদেশ) is an organization of lyricists in Bangladesh. It was formed in 2020 to protect the rights, dignity and professional interests of lyricists and songwriters in the country. The organization works for copyright awareness, welfare of lyricists, and the promotion of Bangladeshi music and songwriting culture. It has organized literary and musical events, discussions and programs honoring lyricists and music personalities in Bangladesh.

== History ==
LAB was formed during the COVID-19 pandemic in 2020 by a group of Bangladeshi lyricists. The organization was established to raise awareness about the moral and financial rights of lyricists and to seek reforms in copyright-related issues in the Bangladeshi music industry. In August 2020, the organization submitted proposals to the Bangladesh Copyright Office for amendments to copyright law.

In 2021, the organization joined with other music-related organizations to form Music Alliance Bangladesh (Sangeet Oikko Bangladesh), a platform created to protect the rights of artistes and music professionals.

The organization held its election in 2022, where lyricist Shahid Mahmud Jangi was elected president, Asif Iqbal became general secretary and Zulfiqer Russell became Organizing Secretary.

== Activities ==
LAB regularly arranges cultural programs, discussions and award ceremonies related to songwriting and music. In 2025, the organization organized the first edition of Geetikobi Adda, where lyricists Shahid Mahmud Jangi, Liton Adhikari Rintu and Golam Morshed were honored for their contributions to Bangladeshi music.

The organization has also protested incidents affecting lyricists and artistes. In 2022, it demanded the recovery of stolen National Film Award (Bangladesh) trophies belonging to lyricist Moniruzzaman Moni.

The association also publishes books and literary works related to Bangladeshi lyricists and songwriting culture.

== See also ==
- Music Alliance Bangladesh
- Copyright in Bangladesh

== Executive body ==
2024-2026

President	Asif Iqbal
Vice-president	Bappy Khan
General Secretary	Joy Shahriar
Joint General Secretary	Bakiul Alam
Organizing Secretary	Sirajum Munir
Finance Secretary	Enamul Kabir Sujan
Cultural Secretary	Shaquie Ahmed
Office Secretary	Apon Ahsan
Information & Technology Secretary	Tushar Hasan
Publicy & Publication Secretary	Rezaur Rahman Rizvi
Executive Member	Ashraf Babu
Executive Member	Ashfaqul Bari
Executive Member	Rabiul Awal
Executive Member	Adhora Jahan
Executive Member	Talha Bin Parvez

2022-2024

President	Shahid Mahmud Jangi
Vice-president	Liton Adhikari Rintu, Golam Murshed
General Secretary	Asif Iqbal, Bappy Khan, Delwar Arzuda Sharaf
Organizing Secretary	Zulfiqer Russell
Finance Secretary	Enamul Kabir Sujan
Cultural Secretary	Joy Shahriar
Office Secretary	Mahmud Manjur
Information & Technology Secretary	Robiul Islam Jibon
Executive Member	Ahmed Risvy
Executive Member	Sirajum Munir
Executive Member	Johny Hoque
Executive Member	Bakiul Alam

2020-2022

President	Shahid Mahmud Jangi
Vice-president	Liton Adhikari Rintu, Golam Murshed, Salauddin Sajal
General Secretary	Kabir Bokul, Asif Iqbal,
Organizing Secretary	Zulfiqer Russell
Finance Secretary	Enamul Kabir Sujan, Mahmud Manjur
Cultural Secretary	Joy Shahriar
Information & Technology Secretary	Robiul Islam Jibon
Executive Member	Shafiq Tuhin
Executive Member	Tarun Munshi
Executive Member	Shomeshwar Oli
Executive Member	Zahid Akbar
