= Music Alliance Bangladesh =

Umbrella organization of music professionals

Music Alliance Bangladesh (MAB)
- সঙ্গীত ঐক্য বাংলাদেশ
- Formation: July 10, 2021; 5 years ago
- Type: Music organization
- Purpose: Working for the welfare of lyricists, composers, singers and other music professionals.
- Headquarters: Dhaka, Bangladesh
- Official language: Bengali language

Music Alliance Bangladesh (MAB) (also known as Sangeet Oikya Bangladesh) is a Bangladeshi umbrella organization of lyricists, composers, singers and other music professionals. It was launched in July 2021 with the aim of protecting the rights of music artists and promoting the dignity and development of Bangladesh's music industry.

== History ==
MAB was officially launched through a virtual press briefing on 10 July 2021. The organization brought together several music-related professional bodies in Bangladesh under one platform. According to the organizers, its main goals were to protect the rights of artists, strengthen cooperation among music professionals, and work for the overall development of the country's music sector.

At the time of its launch, Rabindra Sangeet artist Rezwana Choudhury Bannya was elected as the organization's first president. Lyricist Shahid Mahmud Jangi, singer-songwriter Naquib Khan and singer Kumar Bishwajit were appointed as vice presidents. Other members of the executive committee included lyricist Asif Iqbal, singer Hasan Abidur Reja Jewel, singer-composer Bappa Mazumder, lyricist Zulfiqer Russell, Manam Ahmed, Kabir Bakul, Shawkat Ali Emon and Joy Shahriar.

The alliance was formed after several music organizations, including associations representing lyricists, singers and composers, had worked together on issues related to copyright and the music industry in cooperation with Ministry of Cultural Affairs and Copyright Office of Bangladesh.

== Activities ==
MAB has organized music festivals, conferences and cultural programs across Bangladesh. In July 2022, it arranged National Music Festival and Conference at Bangladesh Shilpakala Academy in Dhaka. The event aimed to unite professionals from the country's music industry and promote Bangladeshi music and culture. The conference featured performances by established and emerging musicians and was attended by government officials and cultural personalities.

The organization also planned a month-long National Music Festival and Conference in Sylhet in June 2022. However, the event was cancelled because of the severe floods in northeastern Bangladesh. The organizers stated that they decided not to continue with the festival in solidarity with the flood-affected people.

== Objectives ==
The main objectives of the organization include:

- Protecting the professional rights of musicians, lyricists, composers and singers.
- Promoting unity among different sectors of Bangladesh's music industry.
- Supporting copyright protection and fair recognition for music creators.
- Organizing cultural events and music-related conferences to encourage the development of Bangladeshi music.

== See also ==
- Lyricists Association of Bangladesh
- Copyright in Bangladesh
