= Kazi Shahid Ahmed =

Bangladeshi businessman (1940–2023)

- কাজী শাহেদ আহমেদ
- Born: 7 November 1940; Jessore, Bengal Province, British India
- Died: 28 August 2023 (aged 82); Dhaka, Bangladesh
- Education: University of Engineering and Technology, Lahore
- Spouses: Ameenah Ahmed
- Children: Anis, Nabil and Inam
- Military career
- Branch: Pakistan Army; Bangladesh Army
- Service years: 1961 - 1977
- Rank: Lieutenant Colonel
- Unit: Corps of Engineers
- Commands: Director of Sena Kalyan Sangstha; Deputy Commandant of Bangladesh Military Academy

Kazi Shahid Ahmed (7 November 1940 – 28 August 2023) was a Bangladeshi businessman journalist, sports organiser, writer, publisher and retired military officer who established the University of Liberal Arts Bangladesh, Ajker Kagoj, and the Gemcon Group.

== Early life and education ==
Ahmed was born on 7 November 1940 in Jessore in the then Bengal Province, British India. He studied engineering at the University of Engineering and Technology, Lahore.

== Career ==
After graduation, Ahmed joined the army and retired as a lieutenant colonel.

After retirement, Ahmed founded Gemcon Group in 1979. He started publishing Ajker Kagoj in 1991. In 2002, he established University of Liberal Arts Bangladesh. He also served as its vice-chancellor until 2007.

Ahmed was the editor and publisher of Ajker Kagoj. He was also a founder of Dhaka Tribune and Bangla Tribune. In 1995, Shahid's first novel was released to the public. His most popular books and novels are "Amar Lekha," "Ghore Agun Legeche," "Bhairab," "Pasha," "Datey Kata Pencil," and "Opekkha."

Ahmed served as an organizer for Abahani Limited Dhaka, a Bangladeshi sports club, since 1976. He played a major role in administering the football club following the death of its founder, Sheikh Kamal, during the Assassination of Sheikh Mujibur Rahman. He remained involved with Abahani until his death.

== Personal life and death ==
Kazi Shahid Ahmed was married to Ameenah Ahmed, a singer. They had three sons, Kazi Nabil Ahmed, a Awami League politician, Kazi Anis Ahmed, a publisher, and Kazi Inam Ahmed, a director of Bangladesh Cricket Board.

Ahmed died on 28 August 2023, at the age of 82.
