= Joy Shahriar =

Bangladeshi singer-songwriter

Joy Shahriar জয় শাহরিয়ার
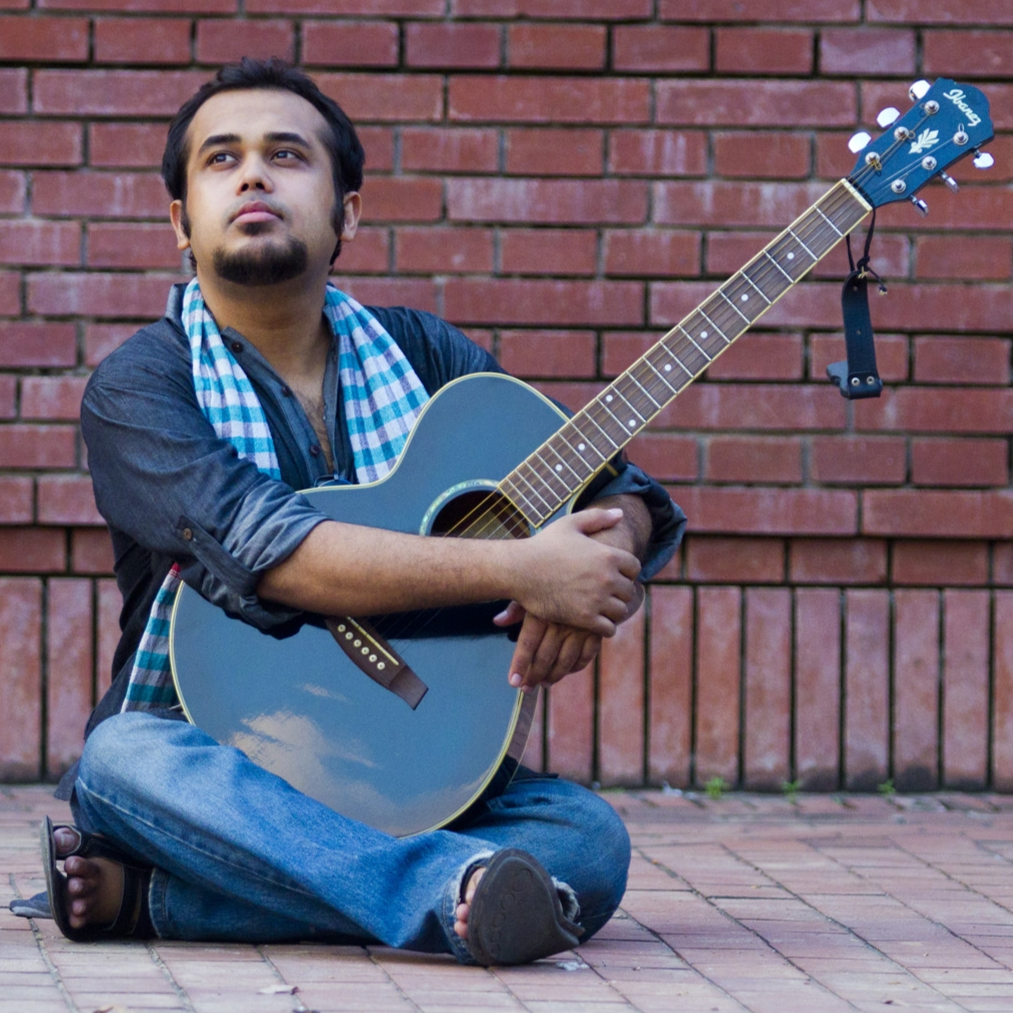

Background information
- Born: Kazi Muyeed Shahriar Shiraz Joy; 19 September; Dhaka, Bangladesh
- Genres: Rock, Blues
- Occupations: Singer, songwriter, composer
- Instruments: Vocal, guitar
- Years active: 2000–present
- Member of: Music Alliance Bangladesh, Lyricists Association of Bangladesh
- Awards: Channel i Music Awards, 2022 CJFB Performance Award, 2009

Kazi Muyeed Shahriar Shiraz Joy (Better known as Joy Shahriar, born 19 September) is a Bangladeshi singer, songwriter, composer and music director. He is known for his work in modern Bangla music, including playback songs, original singles and television productions. He has performed songs in various genres, including pop, rock folk and contemporary Bangla music. In 2022, he won Channel I Music Award for Best Lyricist for the song Ekla Jege Roi and in 2009, he received CJFB Performance Award for Best Debut Singer for his song Shotti Bolchhi. He is the general secretary of Lyricists Association of Bangladesh and founding executive committee of Music Alliance Bangladesh.

== Early life & education ==
Shahriar was born on 19 September. His father Kazi Shiraz and mother Shahriar Akhter Bulu. He developed an interest in music at an early age and received training in singing and music. He later began his professional career as a singer and composer.

He completed Secondary School Certificiate (SSC) from National Bank Public School in 2000 and Higher Secondary School (HSC) Certificate from Dhaka City College in 2002. Later, he completed both his bachelor's and master's degrees in International Relations from University of Dhaka.

== Career ==
=== Music Career ===
He started learning music at age of four with a children's cultural organization called Shurjamukhi. He began his professional music career in 2000 as the lead singer of band Nirjhor. The band released its first album Shopnoghuri, in 2006, followed by Brishtishohor in 2010.

As a solo singer-songwriter, he released his first studio album Shotti Bolchhi in 2009. He later released Akhoni (2011), Thik Ebhabei (2014) and Lapatta (2019).

Since 2012, Joy Shahriar has also been a member of music group The Brotherhood Project. The group released its first album The Brotherhood Project in 2012 and its second album Ta Na Na Na in 2015.

Besides his solo work and band projects, Shahriar has sung playback songs for Bangladeshi films and television dramas. He has also written, composed and arranged music for many singers and musical projects. He has composed music for television programs, advertisements and special productions.

He has released many singles and music videos through different record labels and production companies in Bangladesh. His songs are available on digital streaming platforms and YouTube. He has worked with many well-known singers, lyricists, composers and musicians in the Bangladeshi music industry.

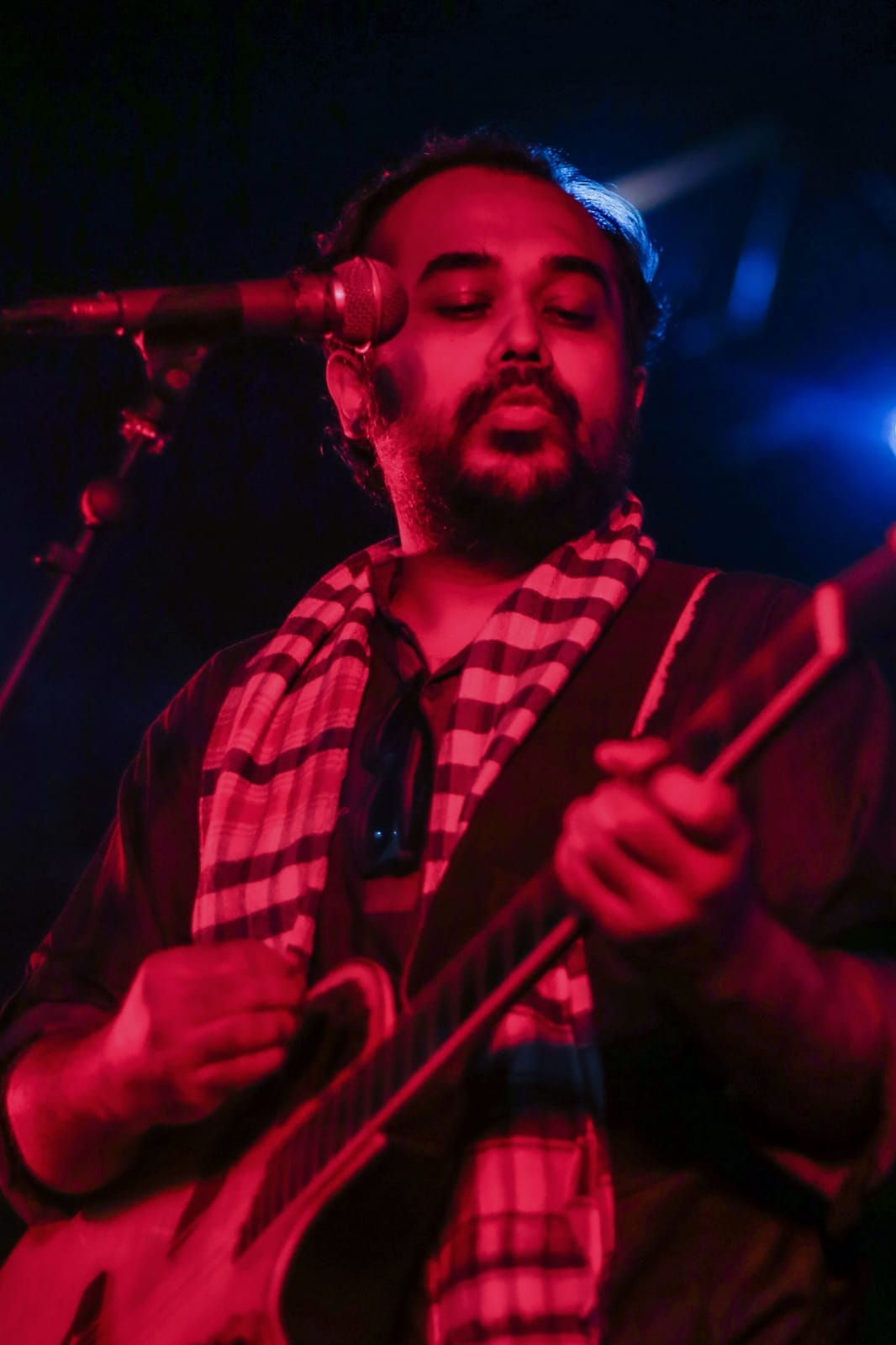
Joy Shahriar live in TSC,Dhaka University

=== Songwriting ===
Since 2014, he has produced more than a hundred songs as a songwriter and record producer for artists of Bangladesh and India, including Subir Nandi, Nachiketa Chakraborty, Kumar Bishwajit, Rupankar Bagchi, Silajit, Bappa Mazumder, Fahmida Nabi, Tahsan, Elita Karim, Parvez, Iman Chakraborty, Imran, Minar, Konal, Kishore, Abanti Sithi, Ronti Das and Rehaan Rasul.

=== Books Publication ===
As an author Joy has published several books since 2006. He is known for his literature work for children like Alabuligulia (2007), Feltu Boltu (2008), Jhompu Crickeler (2009), Madam Khotmote (2013), Zebra Elo Shohore (2020) and Hatirjheele Choruibhati (2023). His lyric book Shotti Bolchhi published in 2021. Joy wrote the biography of Bangladeshi singer Kumar Bisjwajit, titled Ebong Bishwajit (2022) and compiled a biography book on another rock Icon of the country Ayub Bachchu, titled Rupali Guitar (2023).

=== Television ===
He worked as the anchor of a musical show Addar Gaan at the national television channel Maasranga TV from 2012 to 2018. Apart from that, he has worked for various TV and radio shows as a host since childhood.

=== Entrepreneurship ===
He owns a record label. Apart from that, his other ventures as an entrepreneur are Shopnobaj, which is a fashion brand and a publisher Aajob Prokash.

== Personal life ==
His father Kazi Shiraz was a journalist and his mother Shahriar Akhter Bulu is a retired professor of botany and former member of Parliament of Bangladesh.

== Awards ==
Year	Awards	Category	Nominated work	Result	Ref
2022	Channel I Music Award	Best Lyricist	Ekla Jege Roi	won	
2009	CJFB Performance Award	Best Debut Singer	Shotti Bolchhi	won	
