= Ram Mohan =

Indian animator (1931–2019)

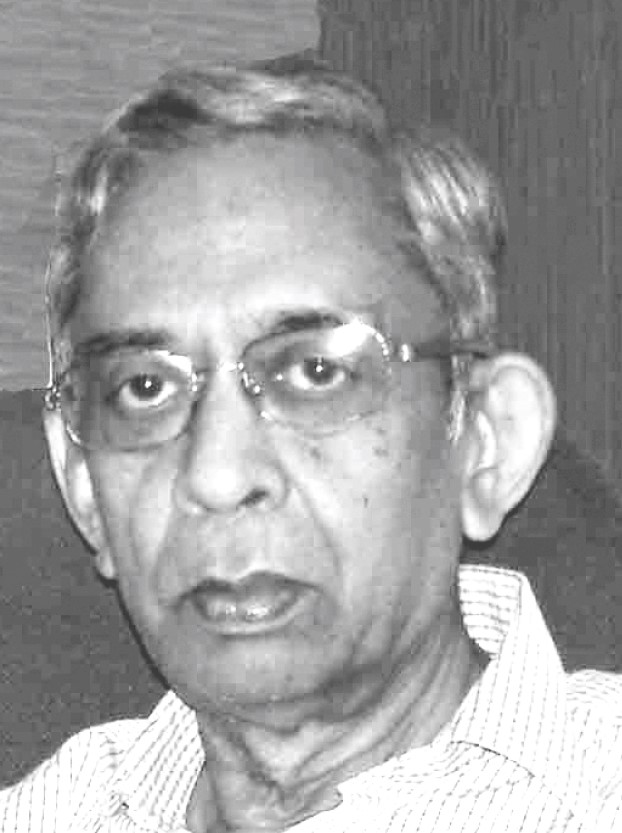
- Born: 26 August 1931
- Died: 11 October 2019 (aged 88); Mumbai, Maharashtra
- Occupations: Animator; Founder, Graphiti Multimedia (1995)
- Known for: You Said It (1972); Fire Games (1983); Ramayana: The Legend of Prince Rama (1992); O' Faby (1993); Meena (1993–2001)
- Awards: Padma Shri (2014)

Ram Mohan (26 August 1931 – 11 October 2019) was an Indian animator, title designer and design educator, who was also known as father of Indian Animation and was a veteran in the Indian animation industry, who started his career at the Cartoon Films Unit, Films Division of India, Government of India in 1956. He was chairman and chief creative officer at Graphiti Multimedia, a Mumbai-based animation company which was established in 1995, and later he also established the Graphiti School of Animation in 2006.

He had won the National Film Award for Best Non-Feature Animation Film twice, You Said It (1972) and Fire Games (1983). He was awarded a lifetime achievement award at the 2006 Mumbai International Film Festival and was awarded the Padma Shri the fourth-highest civilian award given by Government of India in 2014.

== Early life and education ==
Graduated in Chemistry from the University of Madras and later moved to Mumbai for his post-graduate studies but gave it up to join the Cartoon Films Unit, Films Division, Government of India in 1956. He received training in animation techniques from Clair Weeks of Walt Disney Studios, under the US Technical Aid program. Weeks was at the time serving a two-year stint as the head of the Cartoon Films Unit. Another important person to join at the same time was Bhimsain Khurana, who also became a notable animator (Ek Anek Aur Ekta).

== Career ==
Mohan worked as an animator with the Films division till the late 1960s, and thereafter founded Ram Mohan Biographics, in 1972. It ultimately merged with UTV Toons, a division of United Studios Limited (USL) in 1998.

Mohan started out by doing character design and story boards for This Our India, an animated film adapted from a book by Minoo Masani. He scripted, designed and animated many of Cartoon Film unit's productions from 1960 to 1967, including 'Homo Saps' which won the National Award for Best Experimental Film, 1967, and 'Chaos' which won an Award at the Leipzig Festival of short Films in 1968. He participated in the 1967 world retrospective of Animation Cinema in Montreal.

In 1968 he left Films Division and joined Prasad Productions as chief of their animation division. In 1972, he established his own production company, Ram Mohan Biographics, which worked on commercials, and the animated feature Ramayana: The Legend of Prince Rama (1992), which he co-directed in collaboration with Yugo Sako from Japan.

Ram Mohan's film credits include several animation sequences for mainstream filmmakers – an animated song for B.R. Chopra's Pati Patni Aur Woh (1978), a title sequence for Satyajit Ray's Shatranj Ke Khilari, a sequence for Mrinal Sen's Hindi film, Bhuvan Shome, and for films such as Biwi-O-Biwi, Do Aur Do Paanch and Kaamchor.

Ram Mohan was also responsible for the spread of animation in India. Many of the leading animation professionals active today in India started their careers in his studio.

== Death ==
Ram Mohan died on 11 October 2019 in Mumbai at the age of 88.

== Filmography ==
Film	Year	Role	Notes
Certificate of Security	1962	Animator	
Building A Nest	1962	Animator	
Healthy and Happy	1962	Assistant animator	
Mansube Machlidar	1963	Animator	
Exploration of Upper Air	1964	Animator	
A Fable Retold	1965	Animator	
That Touch of Gold	1966	Animator	
Homo Saps	1966	Animator	
That Bright Touch	1966	Animator	
Dreams of Mauji Ram	1966	Animator	
Shadow and Substance	1967	Animator and script writer	
Sandesh	1967	Organization (Aayojan)	
Paint Paint Paint	1968	Animator	
Shadow Across The East	1968	Director	
Baap Re Baap	1968	Director	Animated short film National Award for the Best Film on family planning
Haseena Maan Jayegi	1968	Animation Director	Title sequence
Bhuvan Shome	1969	Animation Artist	
Jitana Chhotta Ho Parivar	1971	Animator	
The Cheats	1971	Commentry Words	
Chain Reaction	1971	Commentry Words	
The Ultimate Ruler	1972	Script Writer	
You Said It	1972	Director, Script Writer and designer	Animated short film National Film Award for Best Non-Feature Animation Film
Bholu Ki Bakari	1976	Script Writer	
An Evergreen Story	1976	Guidance	
Shatranj Ke Khilari	1977	Animation Director	
Tobacco Habits and Oral Cancer	1978	Animator	
Pati Patni Aur Woh	1978	Animation Director	Song "Na Aaj Tha Na Kal Tha"
Precious Water (Anmol Pani)	1980	Script Writer	
In The Service of Mankind	1980	Animator	
The Human Body	1980	Director	
Do Aur Do Paanch	1980	Animation Director	Title sequence
Khubsoorat	1980	Animation	Song "Qayda Qayda"
Insaf Ka Tarazu	1980	Title Design	
Biwi-O-Biwi	1981	Animation Director	Title sequence
Swar Sangam	1981	Animation Director	
Kaamchor	1982	Animation Director	
Angoor	1982	Animation by Ram Mohan Biographics	
The Continuous Line	1983	Graphics by Ram Mohan Biographics	
Fire Games	1983	Director and designer	Animated short film National Film Award for Best Non-Feature Animation Film
The Four Steps	1984	Commentry Words	
Taru	1989	Director and designer	
Ramayana: The Legend of Prince Rama	1992	Director(with Yugo Sako)	Animated feature-length film Indo-Japanese co-production
Meena	1993–2001	Director(16 episodes from 1993 to 2001); Storyboard artist(3 episodes from 1993 to 1995)	Animated children's television show created by UNICEF
O' Faby	1993	Animation Director	Malayalam Film
The Pea Plant Legacy (Three Part Series)	2015	Script writer, Director and executive Producer	

== Awards ==
- 1969– National Award for the Best Film on family planning, "Baap Re Baap".
- 1972– National Film Award for Best Non-Feature Animation Film: You Said It
- 1974– He was commissioned to script, design and direct a series of educational films on population and environment, "Down to Earth" for the International Planned Parenthood Federation and the Family Planning Association of India.
- 1983 – National Award for the Best Animation Film: Fire Games
- 1996– Communication Arts Guild Hall of Frame award for Life Time achievement. Series director:"Meena" for UNICEF, a series of 13 episodes dealing with issues concerning the girl child in south Asia.
- 2001– Advertising Club Award 'ABBY' for Life Time Achievement.
- 2003– I.D.P.A. 'Ezra Mir' award for Life-Time Achievement. Broadcast India
- 2014 – Padma Shri, India's 4th highest civilian award by Govt. of India.

== Bibliography ==
- Lent, John A. Ram Mohan and RM-USL: India's Change Agents of Animation. Animation World, August 1998.
- Design In India on Ram Mohan
