= Pijush Bandyopadhyay =

Bangladeshi actor

- পীযুষ বন্দোপাধ্যায়
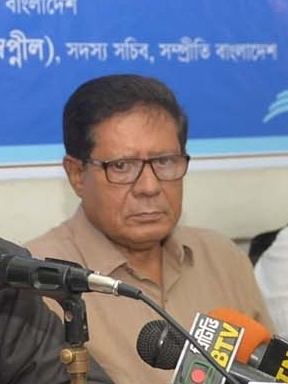
- Bandapadhyay in 2019
- Born: 23 September 1950 (age 75)
- Occupations: Actor, director
- Spouse: Jayosree Kar Jaya

Pijush Bandyopadhyay is a Bangladeshi stage, television and film actor. He is a former managing director of Bangladesh Film Development Corporation (BFDC). Bandyopadhyay was also the former CEO of the privately owned television channel Ekushey Television.

== Career ==
Bandyopadhyay started his acting career through the theatre troupe "Bahubachan". Later, he worked with "Natyachakra". In 1973, he, along with Nasiruddin Yousuff and Selim Al Deen, founded the troupe "Dhaka Theatre".

Bandyopadhyay also directed stage plays including "Meenkanya", "Ekatturer Khudiram" and "Ekatturer Galpo". He acted in films Agami, "Ekatturer Jishu" and others. He played the main character in 'Agami', which was the first parallel movie in Bangladesh, as well as in the first TV serial of Bangladesh titled 'Shokal Shondha'. Some of his most memorable films are 'Bengali Beauty', 'Mrittika Maya', 'Guerilla' and 'Kittonkhola'. He also directed many stage plays including 'Meenkanya', 'Ekatturer Khudiram' and 'Ekatturer Galpo'. In 2007, he published a recitation album titled "Tui Razakar".

Bandyopadhyay was a freedom-fighter at the Bangladesh Liberation War in 1971.

== Personal life and education ==
Bandyopadhyay is married to actress Jayosree Kar Jaya. He admires the ideologies of Rabindranath Tagore. He completed his bachelor's degree from Government Rajendra College, Faridpur and did masters from Mass Communication and Journalism Department, University of Dhaka.

=== False allegation ===
On October 7, 2015, Anti Corruption Commission filed a case against four people, including former FDC managing director Pijush Bandyopadhyay and three others for allegedly embezzling over Tk 3.46 crore from the FDC project by supplying low-quality audio and recording equipment to the corporation. During the investigation of the national anti-corruption agency, Pijush submitted an application to the commission claiming that he, as an artist, worked sincerely to modernise the FDC while he was its managing director during 2012-2014, and was not involved in any corruption. The commission during its investigation did not find Pijush's involvement in procuring equipments for the FDC and that is why his name was left out of the chargesheet.

== Filmography ==
Year	Title	Role	Notes
1988	Suchona	Mohajon	
1993	Ekattorer Jishu	Priest	
1995	Moha Milon	Zahid Mollik	
1995	Shilpi		
2000	Uttarer Khep		
2000	Kittonkhola	Idu	
2001	Meghla Akash	Baker Shakib	
2003	Adhiar	zaminder	
2008	Amar Ache Jol	Nishad and Dilshad's father	
2011	Amar Bondhu Rashed	Ibu's father	
2011	Guerrilla	Anwar Hussain	
2013	Mrittika Maya	Saidur Rahman	
2014	Aami Shudhu Cheyechhi Tomay		
2014	Buno Haansh		
2018	Bengali Beauty	K.M. Iftekhar	
2018	Koli 2.0		
