= Dhaka Lit Fest =

Literary festival in Dhaka, Bangladesh

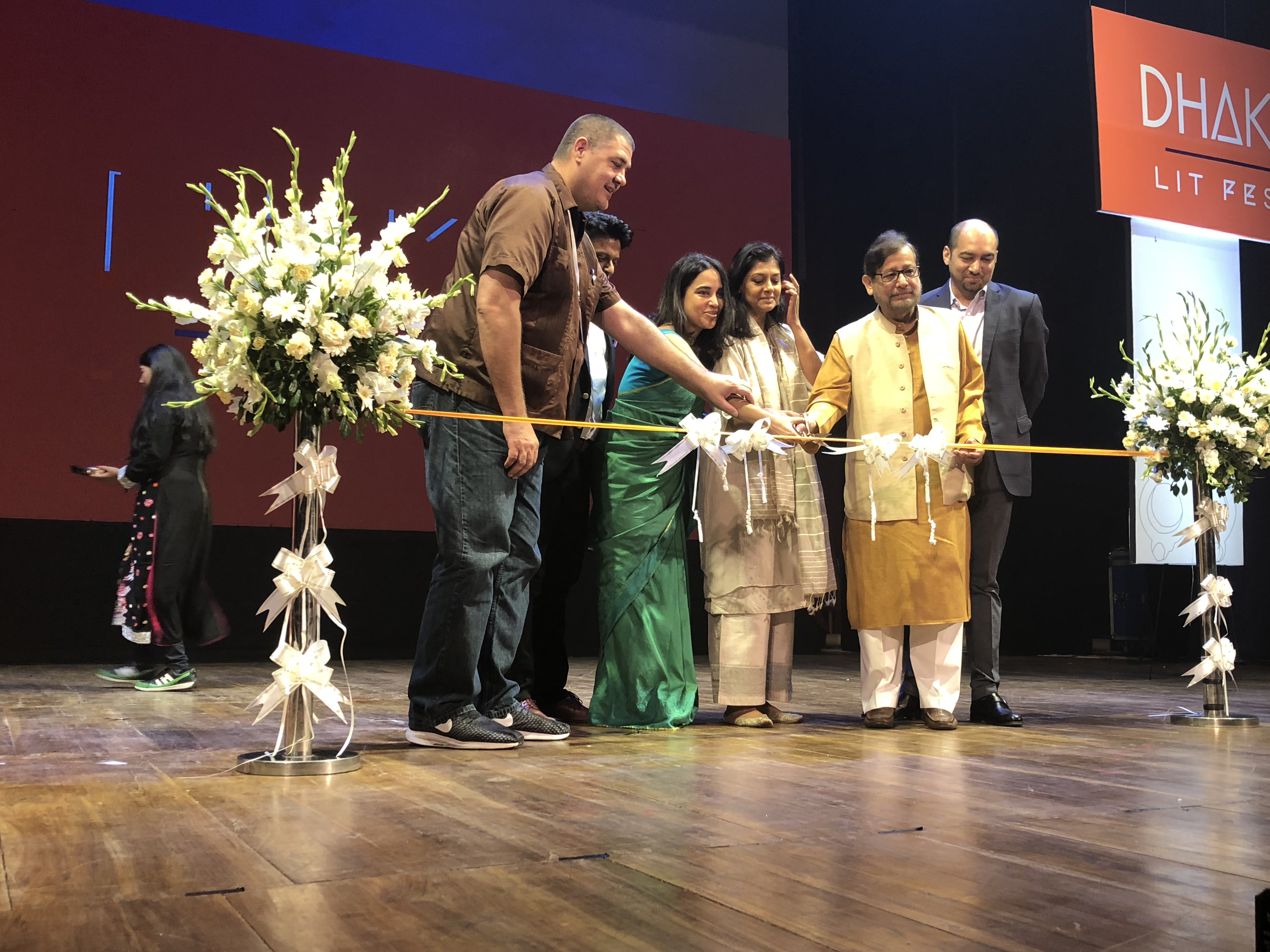
Opening of the Dhaka Lit Fest 2018 with chief guests Adam Johnson, Nandita Das and Asaduzzaman Noor.

Dhaka Lit Fest (also known as Dhaka Literary Festival or DLF) is an annual literary festival held in Dhaka, Bangladesh. Since 2012, it has been held every November in the grounds of Bangla Academy with sessions held over three days, primarily in English.

== History ==
Dhaka Lit Fest began as The Hay Festival Dhaka with the support of the British Council Dhaka in 2011.

In 2015, its current three directors, Sadaf Saaz, Ahsan Akbar and Kazi Anis Ahmed, renamed the festival as "Dhaka Lit Fest" to "mark its commitment to promoting Dhaka, and Bangladeshi literature and culture to the world."

After the July 2016 Dhaka attack, the festival suffered 19 international cancellations. Despite that, the organizers held the festival to show that Bangladesh could still hold an international cultural festival in the face of terrorism. Casey Quackenbush wrote that, "Bangladesh, where independent bloggers and journalists have increasingly become targets of violence, the Dhaka Literary Festival has become a symbol of defiance." That year, the headline author was the Nobel laureate V. S. Naipaul.

In 2017, Dhaka Lit Fest was chosen to host the awarding of the DSC Prize for South Asian Literature. The winner was Anuk Arudpragasam for his novel, The Story of a Brief Marriage.

== Organizers ==
The festival was initiated by Bangladeshi writers Sadaf Saaz, Tahmima Anam, Ahsan Akbar and Kazi Anis Ahmed as Hay Festival Dhaka. As of 2015, its directors are Sadaf Saaz (also producer), Ahsan Akbar and Kazi Anis Ahmed.

== Notable guests ==
Notable international guests include V. S. Naipul, Amitav Ghosh, Abdulrazak Gurnah, Adunis, Shashi Tharoor, William Dalrymple (historian), Tilda Swinton, Marcel Theroux, Lionel Shriver, Shirshendu Mukhopadhyay, Mohammed Hanif, Nandita Das, Monica Ali, HM Naqvi, Tishani Doshi, Swapnamoy Chakraborty, James Meek (author), Jude Kelly, and Jon Snow (journalist), among many others.

Prominent Bangladeshi guests include: Asaduzzaman Noor, Syed Manzoorul Islam, Imdadul Haq Milan, Kaiser Haq, Selina Hossain, Aly Zaker, Shaheen Akhtar, Nishat Majumdar, Raja Devasish Roy, and Muktasree Chakmaamong, among many others.

== Reception ==
DLF has been praised both locally and internationally for its commitment to cultural exchange, freedom of expression and a balance of international and Bengali cultures. The festival's sponsors have been commended for ensuring DLF is free to attend and well-organized.

Some observers have described DLF organizers as Anglophile bourgeois who are the agents of neo-imperial western hegemony in Bangladesh and speculate that they initiated the event to promote themselves as writers in English and groom their own fandom in Dhaka. In response, the organizers point to the significant number of Bengali-language (and other local indigenous Bangladeshi languages) panels, the fact that attendance is free, as well as its celebration of local Bangladeshi literary figures and publishing houses. This view is supported by guests and journalists attending the festival.
