= Liton Adhikari Rintu =

Bangladeshi lyricist and composer

- লিটন অধিকারী রিন্টু
- Born: Liton Abhijit Adhikary Rintu; 24 February; Barishal, Bangladesh
- Occupations: Lyricist, guitarist, music teacher
- Years active: 1982–present
- Notable work: Songs for films/TV/albums
- Spouse: Shelly Elizabeth Adhikary (m. 1985)
- Children: 3
- Awards: UNICEF Meena Media Award

Liton Adhikari Rintu (born 24 February) is a Bangladeshi lyricist, guitarist, music teacher and cultural organizer. He is known for writing modern Bangla songs and for his long contribution to the music industry of Bangladesh. He has worked in music for more than four decades as a lyricist and classical guitar instructor. He is also associated with children’s cultural programming and audio-visual production work in Bangladesh. He is a two-time recipient of the UNICEF Meena Media Award.

== Early life & education ==
Rintu was born on 24 February in Barishal District. His father was Jagannath Adhikari and his mother was Sukhda Adhikari (d. 2010). He is the fifth of six siblings. He completed his education at Barishal Baptist Church Primary School, Dhaka Sahanur Model High School, Barishal Baptist Mission High School, Siddheswari College, and Dhaka City College.

Rintu developed an interest in music during his childhood by listening to church songs sung by his father. In 1974, he took part in a Christian music competition at Barishal Baptist Church with a music group formed by his friends. He began writing Christian songs in 1977.

== Career ==
He started his career as a professional guitarist in the late 1970s. In March 1978, he performed guitar on Bangladesh Television (BTV) and received a remuneration of 50 taka.

In 1980, with support from his elder brother Smith Adhikari, he began working as a guitar instructor at a Music School in Moghbazar, Dhaka. In 1982, inspired by composer Samar Das and supported by NCCB, he established another guitar school at the National Church Council building in Moghbazar.

His songs have been performed by many leading Bangladeshi singers, including Kumar Bishwajit, Sheikh Istiaq, Rabi Chowdhury, Shubro Dev, Runa Laila, Sabina Yasmin, Momtaz Begum, Fakir Alamgir, Ferdous Wahid, Doly Sayontoni, Niaz Mohammad Chowdhury, Shakila Zafar, Shahnaz Rahmatullah, Baby Naznin, and the bands Renaissance and Souls.

From 1981, encouraged by singer Sheikh Istiaq, he started writing modern Bangla songs. Later, musicians and cultural personalities including Kumar Bishwajit, Hanif Sanket, Maksud Jamil Mintu, Ali Akbar Rupu, Farid Ahmed, Naquib Khan, Ayub Bachchu, and Pronob Ghosh encouraged him to continue songwriting.

Besides songwriting, Rintu has worked as a classical guitar trainer for more than forty years. He also worked as Senior Manager of audio-visual programmes at AG Mission. He is the active member of Geetikobi Shongho.

He is one of the regular lyricists for the television program Ityadi since 1989.

== Personal life ==
Rintu married Shelly Elizabeth Adhikary in 1985. They had three children. In the morning of October 19, 1996, their daughter Akash's body was found floating at a lake when Rintu and his family went to visit his mother at Barisal.

== Recognition ==
In 2025, Liton Adhikari Rintu was honoured by Lyricists Association of Bangladesh at the inaugural “Geetikobi Adda” event held at Bishwo Shahitto Kendro in Dhaka. The event recognized his contribution to Bangladeshi music and songwriting. He was also featured in the biographical anthology ''Geetijibon'', a book documenting the lives and careers of twelve prominent Bangladeshi lyricists.

== Awards ==
- UNICEF Meena Media Award
