= ToonBangla =

Bangladeshi animation studio

- Industry: Entertainment
- Founded: 2005; 21 years ago
- Defunct: 7 August 2014
- Fate: Dissolved
- Headquarters: Dhaka, Bangladesh
- Key people: Kazi Zahin Hassan; Nayeem Mahbub
- Products: Motion pictures, Animation
- Services: Studio production and distribution
- Parent: Kazi Farms Group

ToonBangla was a Bangladeshi animation studio based in Dhaka. ToonBangla's notable productions include Murgi Keno Mutant, animation for some Meena episodes, etc.
