= Meena (1993 TV series) =

South Asian children's TV series

- Genre: Children's television series Animated television series
- Created by: Neill McKee; Rachel Carnegie; Ram Mohan and Mostafa Monowar
- Developed by: UNICEF
- Written by: Rachel Carnegie (first series), later Nuzhat Shahzadi and others
- Composer: Raghunath Seth
- Countries of origin: Bangladesh; India; Pakistan; Nepal
- Original languages: Bengali; English; Hindi; Nepali; Urdu; Odia; Dari
- No. of seasons: 1
- No. of episodes: 37

Production
- Cinematography: Richard Chuidian; Dashrath Tharali
- Animators: Sanjeev Waeerkar; Chris Cuddington
- Editors: Arun Gogate; Celso Dumlao; Mario Dumlao
- Running time: ~20 min
- Production companies: United Nations Children's Fund (UNICEF); Hanna-Barbera; Future Thought Productions; UTV Toons; V Animates Production; Bangladesh Television; ToonBangla

Original release
- Network: Bangladesh Television
- Release: 1993 – 2010

Meena is a pan-South Asian children's animated television series created by UNICEF. It has been watched by millions, broadcast in Bengali, English, Hindi, Nepali, Urdu, Odia and Dari languages and first aired on television in 1993 on Bangladesh Television. It has since been broadcast on state television in seven SAARC countries, including DD National in India. Ram Mohan, a famous Indian cartoonist, as well as Mostafa Monowar from Bangladesh, are the animators of the titular character Meena while UNICEF's Rachel Carnegie and Neill McKee were the series creators.

== Objective ==
The cartoon series and multimedia initiative produced with the support of UNICEF and its donors as part of a program to raise awareness against various social inequalities in South Asian countries and to educate children, parents, and community leaders. Awareness created through Meena cartoons includes stopping child marriages, encouraging the construction and use of hygienic toilets, sending girls to school, giving more importance to education than marriage of young girls, stopping dowry, equal nutrition and opportunities for boys and girls. Meena Day is still celebrated today on 24 September every year in some countries of South Asia.

== History ==
From 1991 to 2000, the United Nations declared a decade for South Asian girls. UNICEF is responsible for its expansion. At that time, Bangladesh agreed with the Norwegian Government to provide financial assistance for the production of animated cartoons in South Asia. Meena started its journey in 1990 under the leadership of Neill McKee, Chief of UNICEF Bangladesh Communication Section. The name "Meena" was suggested by Shamsuddin Ahmed of UNICEF, Dhaka and was chosen among other suggestions after careful research throughout the region, which including research on character designs and backgrounds. The late Ram Mohan from Mumbai, was the genius animated film artist and producer behind the success and longevity of Meena. He worked with the animation studio of Hanna Barbera in the Philippines to produce the first few episodes and then later produced many more regional episodes at his studio in Mumbai. Later, Meena cartoons were made in Bangladesh with technical advice from Ram Mohan, under the direction of Mira Mitra, who became the overall coordinator in that country. In the first few years, Rachel Carnegie worked as a consultant with Neill McKee to coordinate and facilitate the creation of the Meena series, involving UNICEF officers in India, Pakistan, Nepal, and Sri Lanka. Dr. Mira Aghi from New Delhi was the lead researcher who trained and supervised researchers throughout South Asia, including on story lines. Nuzhat Shahzadi became the project leader in Bangladesh, and Christian Clarke became the regional coordinator, based at UNICEF's regional office in Kathmandu. Later, Nuzhat Shahzadi took over from him.

== Episodes ==
There are 31 regional Meena episodes and 14 produced in Bangladesh. See this link to view the regional series and download comic books: https://www.neillmckeevideos.com/meena A brief description of many of the episodes in provided below.

No.	Title
1	"Count Your Chickens"
Meena wishes to go to school, but her parents see no purpose to this, because she is a girl. To overcome this problem, Meena enlists the help of her parrot, Mithu, who memorizes the school lesson and relays it to her after class. As a result, Meena learns how to count in twos. She counts her family's chickens and realizes that one is missing. It turns out that a thief has stolen the chicken. The villagers chase the thief and are able to recover the chicken. As a result of this incident, Meena's parents realize the value of education and allow her to attend school along with her brother, Raju.
2	"Dividing the Mango"
Meena's mother feeds her younger brother, Raju, a bigger portion than Meena because he is a boy. Meena believes this is unfair so she and Raju switch places for a day to see what it is like. Raju has to do all of Meena's household chores such as feeding the chickens, sweeping the floors and drawing water. Meena has to do Raju's chores; however, there is less work to do and Meena spends a lot of the day playing. Raju comes home at the end of the day and tells his parents how difficult it was to do all of Meena's chores. The episode ends with Raju and Meena receiving the same meal portions.
3	"Will Meena Leave School?"
Meena's father is worried because the family has run out of money. Meena and her father have to go to the shopkeeper to get a loan of rice. The shopkeeper tries to cheat them by increasing the amount of the debt, but Meena stops him due to her ability to read. Meanwhile, the mother is looking for ways to earn money. The school teacher visits their home and tells the mother that she can work from home. The family buys a cow, as well as a bike so the father can sell the milk in the village. The shopkeeper tells them that if the family cannot repay the debt, then he will take the cow, the calf and Mithu. Meena's father gets a fever so he is unable to sell the milk in the village. Meena and Raju go instead, but their bike crashes, which delays their ability to repay the debt to the shopkeeper. Mithu carries the money back home instead so that the debt is repaid in time.
4	"Who's Afraid of the Bully?"
Meena and her friends get together to solve the problem of bullies.They fight against bullies and defeat them.This episode give us lesson to never be afraid.
5	"Saving a Life"
Meena saves baby Rani when she has diarrhea.
6	"Meena's Three Wishes"
Meena dreams of a genie in a magic lamp who grants her three wishes about the hygiene and sanitation of her village people. As she wakes up, she decides to fulfil those wishes herself, as there is no magic lamp holding a genie for real. She then tackles the issues of hygiene and sanitation with the help of Raju, Mithu and all her friends.
7	"Say No to Dowry"
Meena and her family question the practice of dowry. In Meena's village, there is a poor family with a daughter named Tara. The shopkeeper and his brother meet with Tara's father about Tara's marriage with the Shopkeeper's nephew. The Shopkeeper's family is greedy. They don't realize that Tara's family are poor, and continually request dowry. One day Mithu was on the window of the shopkeeper's house. He sees that they plan to want more dowry after marriage such as bicycle at first and then a motorcycle. Mithu informs Meena and Tara on this topic. Tara's family becomes confused. At last they close this plan of marriage and inform their neighbors.
8	"Too Young to Marry"
Can Meena help her cousin who is being married before the legal age?
9	"Take Care of Girls"
Girls and boys have an equal right to health care.
10	"I Love School"
A good teacher makes all the difference.
11	"It's Got to Be a Boy!"
Meena teaches her uncle to welcome the birth of girls and boys equally.
12	"Meena in the City"
Meena experiences the life of a domestic child worker.Meena become a child worker in a house in city Meena face domestic violence her neighbor's maid Sara give meena a newspaper to show a new school has started for maids worker in a high age meena suggest Sara can join that school.
13	"AIDS: A Girl's Story"
Meena helps challenge stigma and some myths about HIV/AIDS.
14	"Learning to Love"
Children need stimulation, care and play from an early age, and fathers' involvement in their development is important.
15	"Strangers in the Village"
Coping with differences and peace building in conflict situations
16	"Reaching Out"
Community care and support for people living with HIV and AIDS
17	"Meena and Her Friend"
Iodine deficiency disorders and support for children suffering from IDD
18	"It Could Happen to Anyone"
Keeping children safe from accidents, including road accidents among adolescents
19	"The Girls Came Back"
Trafficking and sexual exploitation of girls
20	"When Meena was Born"
Exclusive breastfeeding for the first six months and complementary feeding along with breast milk after that
21	"When Meena was a Little Girl"
Low birth weight among infants and its prevention
22	"Seeing in the Dark"
Vitamin A deficiency and prevention
23	"Health in your Hands"
The importance of hand washing to be healthy
24	"Safety from Worms"
Worm infestation and prevention.how to stay safe and hygienic and how to use soap shampoo hand wash sanitizers correctly how to stay safe from virus bacteria germs are the main theme of this episode.
25	"Fair Play for Girls"
Girls' right to play and recreation
26	"Baby Rani's Four Visits"
The importance of EPI (immunization)
27	"We Love Books"
The need for quality learning materials for education
28	"Learning with Meena"
The importance of educating girls promoting education among girls
29	"School First, Marriage Later"
Prevention of early marriage and retention of older girls in school.Preventing child marriage and do education
30	"Teacher Helps to Learn"
Quality of education in classroom situations
31	"Let's Go to School Together"
Retention of girls in school (after primary)
32	"Learning Can be Fun"
Need for quality education
33	"Life has Changed"
While Meena is at school, an earthquake occurs. When people arrive from affected villages, Meena bonds with a new girl at her school who was separated from her parents in the earthquake.
34	"Meena in Mythes Country"
Right way to baby birth
35	"Angel's Story"
Helping episode
36	"Meena Came Back to the Village"
Stopping children's persecution
37	"Life Smiled Again"
The episode is based on the 2005 Kashmir earthquake. Many families from affected areas come to Meena's village for shelter and protection. Meena becomes friends with a girl named Nasreen and helps her find her family.
38	"Meenar Bondhu Anu"
The episode is based on autism. Sushanta Kumer Saha (Anupam) is the Director of this Episode.
39	"Mono Elo Meenar Graame"
The episode is based on do not rul for children. Sushanta Kumer Saha (Anupam) is the Director of this Episode.
38	"Rupkothar Deshe Meena"
The episode is based on awareness about children birth. Sushanta Kumer Saha (Anupam)/ S S Anupam is the Director of this Episode.

== Characters ==
- Meena: Main character.
- Raju: Meena's younger brother.
- Mithu: Mina's closest friend and her pet parrot.
- Rani: Meena-Raju's younger sister.
- Grandmother: Meena-Raju's old grandmother.
- Parents: Meena-Raju's parents.
- Lali: Meena's cow.
- Munmun: Meena's goat.
- Leader: The leading personality of the village.
- Shopkeeper: Feudal, oppressive, deceitful man. He has a shop in the market and his son has just passed medical from the city. He is the main villain in the cartoon series.
- Rita: A sister studying in the upper class of School, where Meena studies in. She was later married to the shopkeeper's son.
- Dipu: Meena's naughty friend. Mithu helps Dipu to become aware at different times.
- Teacher of the school: She helps Meena with various problems with time and wise advice.

There has also been the arrival of different characters in different series at different times.

- Aunt: Meena-Raju's father's elder sister. Bad-tempered, cruel woman.

=== Meena ===
Meena
- Meena character
- Meena cartoon official logo
- First appearance: "Count Your Chickens" (1993)
- Created by: UNICEF and Hanna-Barbera
- Designed by: Neill McKee; Ram Mohan
- Voiced by: Promita Ganguly (Bengali); Rajashree Nath (Hindi)

In-universe information
- Alias: Mina
- Gender: Female
- Occupation: Schoolgirl
- Family: Father and Mother; Raju (brother); Mithu (pet parrot)

Meena is a fictional character who stars in the television show of the same name. The show is broadcast in the English, Bengali, Hindi, Nepali, and Urdu, Odia and Dari languages. Meena educates the children of South Asia on issues of gender, health, and social inequality through her stories in comic books, animated films, and radio series (affiliated with the BBC).

Secondary characters of her stories include her brother Raju and her pet parrot Mithu. Her adventures include attempting to gain an education, sharing meals with Raju on an equal level, learning about HIV, how to give birth to a baby properly, and volunteering. Her stories are all advocates of changing societal and cultural norms.

Her popularity is due to her not being closely bound to just one country or culture of South Asia, but uniting the common characteristics of them all. The character of Meena was created by a team of people in UNICEF that was led by Neill McKee, head of the Communication Section in the early 1990s. He chose Rachel Carnegie as the main facilitator and brought in Ram Mohan, a famous Indian cartoonist, Dr. Mira Aghi of India as chief researcher, and Nuzhat Shahzadi as script co-writer and implementation coordinator for Bangladesh. She later became the Regional Coordinator based in Kathmandu, Nepal, following the tenure of Christian Clark, a Canadian. Five early episodes were created with assistance from the studios of FIL Cartoons, Manila, owned by Hanna Barbera Cartoons, California. Thereafter, Ram Mohan and his team did the work in their studio in Mumbai, India, using computer animation starting in the mid-1990s. From the beginning, the Meena team consulted with UNICEF staff, NGOs, and government people and carried out hundreds of focus groups and individual interviews throughout the region to arrive at the characters, names, backgrounds, and stories. The first Meena episode was launched in 1993 on Bangladesh Television in Dhaka.

== Other activities ==
UNICEF Bangladesh launched the UNICEF Meena Media Award in 2005 to create awareness among journalists for better reporting on children in the media. In 2012, UNICEF launched a live radio show featuring Meena, Mithu and Raju as presenters. In 2016, on the 70th anniversary of UNICEF, it launched the 'Meena Game'.

== See also ==
- UNICEF Meena Media Award, given for promoting children's rights in Bangladesh
- Burka Avenger
- The 99 (TV series)
