= Syed Badrul Ahsan =

Bangladeshi journalist and author

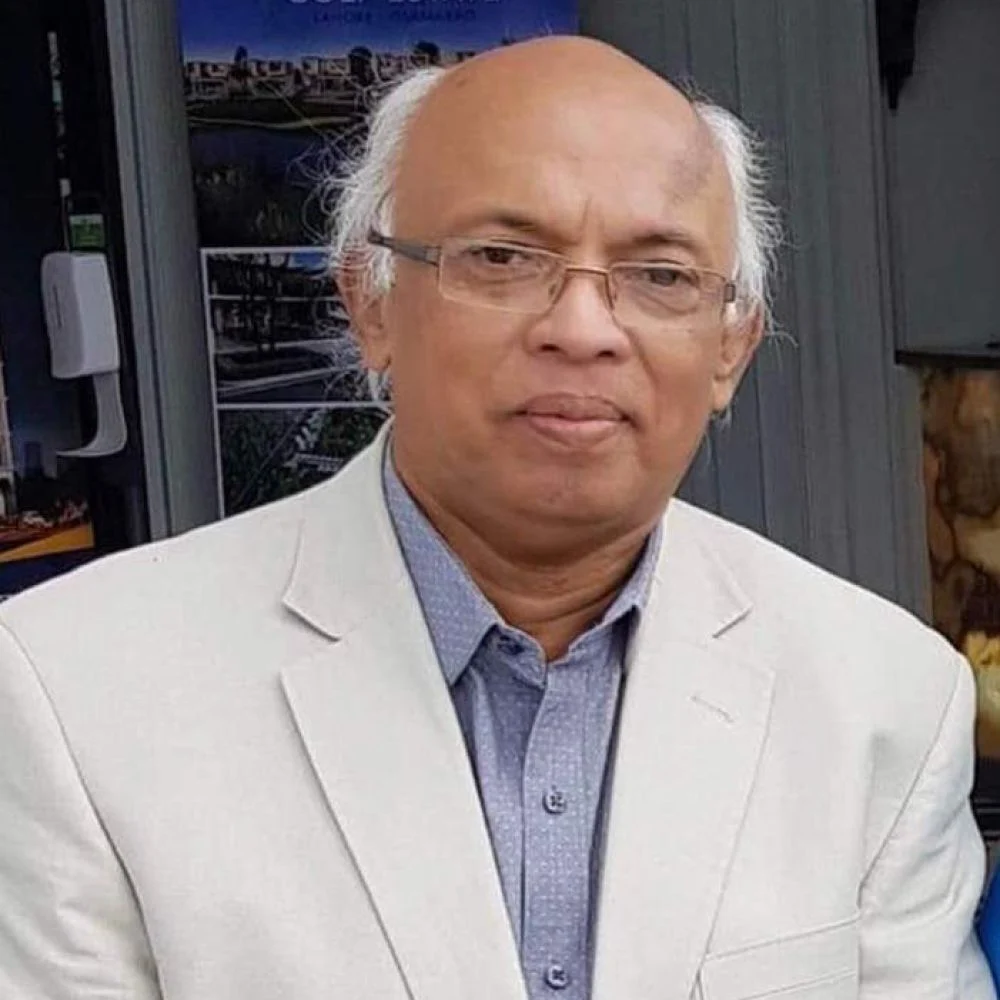
- Ahsan in 2022
- Born: 1954 (age 71–72)
- Occupation: Journalist
- Spouse: Syeda Zahia Ahsan (née Badrudduja)
- Parents: Syed Nazirul Haque (father); Suraiya (mother)

Syed Badrul Ahsan is a Bangladeshi journalist and author who currently serves as editor-in-charge of The Asian Age, a publication based in Dhaka. He previously served as the press minister at the High Commission of Bangladesh, London and has worked for numerous universities such as the University of Dhaka, Independent University, Bangladesh, and University of Liberal Arts Bangladesh as well as being a Fellow at Jawaharlal Nehru University. Ahsan is a regular contributor to Dhaka Courier, First News, Dhaka Tribune, Bangla Tribune, The Daily Star Our Time, Indian Express, Asian Affairs and South Asia Monitor.

== Early life ==
Syed Badrul Ahsan was born in 1954 in Noagaon village, Araihazar, Narayanganj. He is the son of Syed Nazirul Haque and Suraiya. His paternal grandfather was the scholar and educator Syed Muhibb ul-Rahman.

He was a fourth-generation descendant of Syed Ahmad Baksh.

Ahsan studied at the St. Francis Grammar School, Pakistan, and Notre Dame College, Dhaka. He completed his bachelor's in English literature at the University of Dhaka.

== Career ==
Ahsan was the Press Minister at the Bangladesh High Commission in London from 1997 to 2000. He taught English at Notre Dame College, Dhaka.

Ahsan has served as the executive editor and current affairs editor of The Daily Star. He edited Star Books Review and Literature.

Ahsan is the editor-in-charge of The Asian Age, a publication based in Dhaka. He was a faculty member of the University of Liberal Arts Bangladesh and Independent University Bangladesh.

In 2020, Ahsan was nominated for the Sohel Samad Memorial Award of the Press Institute of Bangladesh. He is the deputy editor of The Round Table: The Commonwealth Journal of International Affairs and Policy Studies.

=== Views ===
Syed has pro Awami League stance and has dismissed allegations of human rights abuses by the death squads of Jatiya Rakkhi Bahini and Bangladesh Krishak Sramik Awami League as "myths". In 2023, he criticised the Bangladesh Nationalist Party's decision to support visa sanctions against Bangladesh, quoting that the government of Sheikh Hasina was not a "banana republic."

== Personal life ==
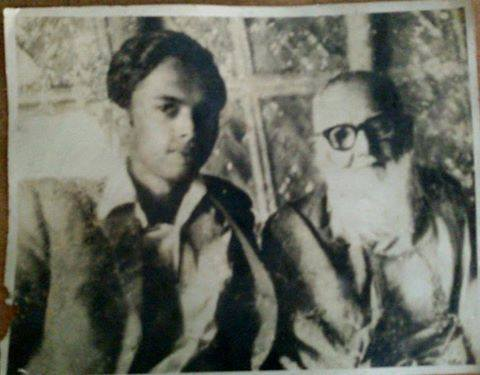
Syed Badrul Ahsan (left) with Syed Muhibb al-Rahman (right)

Syed Badrul Ahsan married Syeda Zakia Ahsan (née Badrudduja), who was the youngest daughter of Syed Badrudduja and Rakia Badrudduja (née Khatoon).

== Bibliography ==
- From Rebel to Founding Father: Sheikh Mujibur Rahman
- Glory and Despair: The Politics of Tajuddin Ahmad (2008)
- History Makers in Our Times (2008)
