= Ramayana: The Legend of Prince Rama =

1992 anime film by Yugo Sako

- DVD cover
- Directed by: Koichi Sasaki; Ram Mohan; Yugo Sako
- Screenplay by: Narendra Sharma; Rani Burra; Ram Mohan; Koichi Sasaki; Hiroshi Onogi; Ram Mohan; Yugo Sako (Note: Yugo Sako is also credited with conceiving the film alongside Vijay Nigam.)
- Based on: Ramayana by Valmiki
- Produced by: Yugo Sako
- Starring: Nikhil Kapoor; Rael Padamsee; Uday Mathan; Mishal Varma; Noel Godin
- Edited by: Makoto Arai
- Music by: Vanraj Bhatia
- Animation by: Kazuyuki Kobayashi; Doga Kobo
- Production company: Nippon Ramayana Films
- Distributed by: TEM Co., Ltd. Showcase Entertainment (United States)
- Release dates: 10 January 1993 (International Film Festival of India); 3 November 1997 (Japan)
- Running time: 135 minutes
- Countries: Japan; India
- Languages: English; Hindi
- Budget: ¥800 million

Ramayana: The Legend of Prince Rama is a 1993 Indo-Japanese anime film directed and produced by Yugo Sako, who co-directed the film with Koichi Sasaki and Ram Mohan. It is an adaptation of the Indian epic Ramayana. The film featured music composed by Vanraj Bhatia and was first released in India at the 24th International Film Festival of India. It was also screened at the 1993 Vancouver International Film Festival. Subsequently, a Hindi dubbed version was released in the late 1990s. On Jan 24, 2025, it was re-released in theatres in 4K with old English dub and new dubs in Hindi, Tamil and Telugu.

== Premise ==
The king of Ayodhya, Dasharatha is forced by his third wife Kaikeyi, on the basis of a boon promised by himself, to exile prince Rama for 14 years, where Rama, along with his brother Lakshmana and wife Sita, departs from Ayodhya and starts a new life in the forests of Panchavati until Ravana, the demon king of Lanka, abducts Sita in order to retaliate Rama for his sister, Shurpanakha's dishonor. Not finding Sita at the hut where they resided, Rama and Lakshmana set out to rescue Sita and find Jatayu, who tells him about Sita's abduction committed by Ravana. Moving on, they find Hanuman and Sugriva, the king of Kishkindha who leads an army of forest dwelling people called Vanaras, and seek their help. The Vanaras are generally depicted as humanoid apes, or human-like beings. They come to know about Ravana's residence in Lanka by Jatayu's elder brother Sampati. Then, the army of Rama forays towards Lanka, defeats Ravana's army and Rama gets his wife back. In the end, Rama along with his people, returns to Ayodhya where the residents of Ayodhya welcome them festively.

== Voice cast ==
=== English ===
- Nikhil Kapoor - Rama
- Rael Padamsee – Sita
- Uday Mathan – Ravana
- Mishal Varma – Lakshmana
- Noel Godin – Hanuman
- Bulbul Mukherjee – Dasharatha
- Madhulika Varma – Kaikeyi
- Rahul Bose – Bharata
- Pearl Padamsee – Manthara
- Bhargava Krishna – Kumbhakarna
- Shagufta Jaffrey – Shurpanakha
- Easo Vivin Mathew – Indrajit
- Denzil Smith – Sugriva
- Cyrus Broacha – Angada
- Dodo Bhujwala – Additional Voices
- Rohan Arthur – Additional Voices
- Avi Shroff – Additional Voices
- Akash Sharma S - Additional Voices
- Salome Parikh – Additional Voices
- Farid Saboonchi – Additional Voices
- Leeya Mehta – Additional Voices

=== Hindi ===
==== Original Dub (1997) ====
- Shatrughan Sinha – Narrator
- Arun Govil – Rama
- Namrata Sawhney – Sita
- Shakti Singh – Lakshmana
- Adarsh Gautam – Bharata
- Dilip Sinha – Hanuman
- Amrish Puri – Ravana
- Harjeet Walia – Dasharatha
- Sava – Kaikeyi
- Manju Bhatia – Manthara
- Rakesh Vidua – Jatayu
- Umesh Sharma – Jambavan
- Raj Joshi – Sugriva
- Pradeep Shukla – Kumbhakarna

==== Remastered Dub (2025) ====
- Dishi Duggal – Narrator
- Yudhvir Dahiya – Rama
- Sonal Kaushal – Sita
- Upalaksh Kocchar – Lakshmana
- Kritarth Trivedi – Bharata
- Lohit Sharma – Shatrughna
- Archit Maurya – Hanumana
- Rajesh Jolly – Ravana
- Anil Dutt – Dasharatha
- Manoj Pandey– Indrajeet
- Chand Dhar – Malyavan
- Mayur Vyas – Vibhishana
- Samay Raj Thakkar– Vishwamitra
- Vinod Sharma – Kumbhakarna
- Sahil Kulkarni – Angada

== Production ==
=== Development ===
In 1983, while working on "The Ramayana Relics" a documentary film about excavations by Dr. B. B. Lal near Allahabad in Uttar Pradesh, India, Yugo Sako came to know about the story of Ramayana. He liked the story of the Ramayana so much that he researched deeper into the topic and went on to read 10 versions of the Ramayana in Japanese. After reading the Ramayana he wanted to adapt it into animation as he didn't think a live-action movie could capture the true essence of Ramayana, "Because Ram is God, I felt it was best to depict him in animation, rather than by an actor."

The Indian Express published an article about Yugo Sako's "The Ramayana Relics" documentary on 25 April 1983. Soon thereafter, a protest letter based on the misunderstanding from the Vishva Hindu Parishad was received by the Japanese Embassy in Delhi, which said that no foreigners could arbitrarily cinematize Ramayana because it was the great national heritage of India. After the misconceptions were cleared, Yugo Sako proposed the idea of an animated Ramayana to the VHP and the government. He told them that animation was a serious art form in Japan and it would help bring the Ramayana to a wider global audience. The Government agreed initially, but later declined his proposal for a bi-nation collaboration, saying the Ramayana is a very sensitive subject and cannot be portrayed as a cartoon. The Hindu fundamentalist group Vishwa Hindu Parishad protested the depiction of gods and goddesses as cartoon figures, forcing the film to be completed in Japan. The fact that the movie was being made at the height of the Ram Janmabhoomi movement, which culminated in the demolition of the Babri Masjid on December 6, 1992, further axed its chances of an Indian release.

With no choice and support left, the movie was decided to raise all production funds in Japan and to produce with artists from both nations. TEM Co., Ltd. financed the production and a new production studio Nippon Ramayana Film Co., Ltd. was set up and the principal animation of the film began in 1990 with 450 artists on board. Indian animators guided their Japanese teammates with Indian customs and traditions depicted in the film like how dhotis are worn and how the children receive blessings from their elders.

== Music ==
Ramayana: The Legend of Prince Rama

Soundtrack album by Vanraj Bhatia
- Released: 1993
- Genre: Anime film soundtrack
- Languages: Sanskrit; Hindi

There are different songs for the Original English Version (sung in Sanskrit) and the Hindi Dub version (sung in Hindi), both are listed below.

All lyrics are written by Vasant Dev.

English version (Sanskrit track listing)
No.	Title	Singer(s)	Length
1.	"Panchvati Man Bhavan Upwan"	Kavita Krishnamurthy
2.	"Janani Main Ramdoot Hanuman"	Vinod Rathod
3.	"Nirjhar Jal"	Suresh Wadkar & Kavita Krishnamurthy
4.	"Shri Raghuvar Ki Vanar Sena"	Chorus
5.	"Jai Lankeshwar"	Chorus

All lyrics are written by P.K. Mishra.

Hindi version (Hindi track listing) (Old dub)
No.	Title	Singer(s)	Length
1.	"Sumiran Karle Mannwa"	Kavita Krishnamurthy
2.	"Panchvati Man Bhavan Upwan"	Sadhana Sargam
3.	"Janani Main Rama Doot Hanuman"	Udit Narayan
4.	"Ashru Nayan Se"	Hariharan & Kavita Krishnamurthy
5.	"Shri Raghuvar Ki Vaanar Sena"	Chorus
6.	"Jai Lankeshwar"	Chorus
7.	"Ram Bolo"	Channi Singh

The original audio cassette album included 2 Sanskrit songs as well as the complete Hindi song playlist. The album was distributed by United Music Company, which was later acquired by The Walt Disney Company India. The track listing is given below.

All lyrics are written by Vasant Dev, P.K. Mishra.

Cassette version (All tracks listing)
No.	Title	Singer(s)	Length
1.	"Janani Main Ram Doot Hanuman"	Udit Narayan
2.	"Panchavati Van Bhavan Upvan"	Sadhana Sargam
3.	"Ram Tumhari Sita (Ashru Nayan Se)"	Hariharan & Kavita Krishnamurthy
4.	"Milkar Rama Bolo"	Channi Singh
5.	"AD 1 (Aartiyan By Sadhana Sargam)"	Sadhana Sargam
6.	"AD 2 (Love by Hariprasad Chaurasia)"	Hariprasad Chaurasia
7.	"Sumiran Karle Manwa"	Kavita Krishnamurthy
8.	"Shri Raghuvar Ki Vanar Sena"	Kumar Mukesh, and Chorus
9.	"Badhe Chalo Badhe Chalo"	Kumar Mukesh, and Chorus
10.	"Jai Lankeshwar Jai Rakshaspati"	Kumar Sonik, and Chorus
11.	"Janani Hum Ram Doot Hanuman"	Vinod Kumar Rathod
12.	"Nirjhar Jal (Kutra Gatam Vaidehi)"	Suresh Wadkar & Kavita Krishnamurthy
13.	"Janani Main Ram Doot Hanuman"	Udit Narayan

== Release ==
The original English version with Sanskrit songs was worked on by teams from both countries and was screened for the first time at 24th International Film Festival of India, New Delhi, 10–20 January 1993. The film was also shown at the 1993 Vancouver International Film Festival.

The Hindi dub version was released in the late 1990s. Arun Govil, who is popularly known for playing the role of Rama in Ramayan (1987 TV series) voiced Prince Rama in the version.

This film was distributed as a work in the 40th Anniversary of the Establishment of the Diplomatic Relations between Japan and India. All India Distribution was by Kamal Hassan, Rajan Lall and Shringar Films. The film was not theatrically released on a large scale as the Ram Janmabhoomi (Birthplace) Movement was at its peak and the movie embroiled in controversy. However it had a limited theatrical run in some parts of India in April 1997 and was screened in Japan at the Tokyo International Fantastic Film Festival in on 3 November 1997 and in at Yokohama Landmark Hall in Yokohama on 10 November 1997. Later, it was released on TV channels Cartoon Network and Pogo repeatedly and DVD of this work was also sold. It was the opening film of the 2000 Lucca Animation Film Festival in Italy, a highlight of the Cardiff Animation Film Festival in the United Kingdom.

Official activity stopped after the TV broadcast in India in 2006, but the film was shown in Japan at a mini-theatre Cinema Novecento in Yokohama from 1 September 2018 to 30 September 2019 and at an event at Tokyo University of Foreign Studies on 10 January 2020, both in 35mm film was screened using.

Megumu Ishiguro, co-founder and former President of Doga Kobo Animation Studio, the Production Controller and key animator on the film, toured India in 2020 to talk to fans about the animation process and promote the remaster project, organised by AIMAP and the Japan Foundation. The tour began with a Retrospective event by Graphiti Animation for the late Ram Mohan in association with Films Division in Mumbai on February 11, 2020, and continued until February 26, with talks and exchanges in Mumbai, Ahmedabad, Gandhinagar, Palanpur, Nagpur, Bengaluru, Chennai and New Delhi. Kenji Yoshii, the assistant producer for the film and a director of TEM Co., Ltd, also attended the retrospective event and declared at that time that TEM will digitally remaster and release the work again.

In December 2021, an official website was launched with an announcement that a digitally remastered version will be released.

2022 was an important year for both countries as they marked 70 years of India-Japan relations. On the occasion of the 70th Anniversary Year, the 4K digitally remastered film was launched during the 5th edition of Japanese Film Festival in India, along with 10 other films. Atsushi Matsuo, the executive producer, and Kenji Yoshii, the assistant producer met the Indian Prime Minister Narendra Modi and informed him of the release of the digitally remastered version of the film during his visit to Japan in May 2022.

Special screenings for the 4K Ultra HD remaster were conducted in various countries:

1. Japanese Film Festival 2022, New Delhi (March 4–7, 2022)
2. 70th edition of the Mumbai International Film Festival (MIFF) 2022 (May 31, 2022)
3. Sitges Film Festival 2022, Sitges (October 6, 2022)
4. Animation Is Film (October 23, 2022) A major animation festival produced by GKIDS in collaboration with Annecy International Animation Film Festival and Variety in Hollywood
5. Japan Society, New York (January 20, 2023)
6. Vancouver International Film Festival 2023 (June 25–26, 2023)
7. ANIMIX Festival in Tel Aviv, Israel (July 15 and August 10, 2023)
8. Fantasia International Film Festival 2023 in Montreal, Canada (August 5, 2023)
9. In various Japanese cities between 2022 and 2023
10. 2 screenings were held in London in 2023 at the central London venue of The Prince Charles Cinema, off Leicester Square of the remaster by a long-standing follower and supporter of the film, Ravi Swami, who wrote the first review of the film outside of India or Japan in the 1993 U.K publication "Anime UK", edited by Helen McCarthy, and acting as sales agent for the film via TEM.

On September 19, new Hindi, Tamil, and Telugu versions were released by Geek Pictures, with V. Vijayendra Prasad as creative director. Remastered 4K versions of both the new and original English dubs were to be screened across India but the release was postponed. Later, it was released on 24 January 2025.

== Reception ==
When it was screened at the Vancouver International Film Festival, festival director Alan Franey called the film "extraordinary", and said "The backgrounds are done in beautiful detail, while the foreground characters are an Indian version of the Disney style, with big dewey eyes."

Ken Eisner, writing in Variety in 1993, was critical of the film, saying the film is "relentlessly paced" and "not even great to look at." Madhu Jain of India Today called it a "charming film, despite some minor errors". She further wrote, "Sita looks like Snow White in a saffron sari and Ram, lily white, bows and moves like a Samurai warrior. One would expect him to say sayonara any moment."

== Alternative version ==
=== The Prince of Light: The Legend of Ramayana ===
In the United States, the film was released as The Prince of Light: The Legend of Ramayana, or Warrior Prince, by Krishna Shah and Showcase Entertainment. This version was released in a further localized English dub with narration by James Earl Jones, prince Rama voiced by Bryan Cranston, additional music by Alan Howarth and the runtime being shortened to 90 minutes. That version was released on 9 November 2001.

Robert Koehler reviewed it for Variety, giving it a critical review. He described the film as a "curious fusion of an interesting if simplified literary adaptation with emphatically second-rate animation technique" and said "the blatantly American vocal casting and direction are painfully out of kilter with the 5,000-year-old Indian setting".

The film won "Best Animation Film of the Year" award at the Santa Clarita International Family Film Festival. In 2001, Academy of Motion Picture Arts & Sciences announced a new category, Academy Award for Best Animated Feature. Ramayana was one of nine films that qualified for nomination, but ultimately was not.

==== Voice cast ====
- Bryan Cranston - Rama
- Edie Mirman – Sita
- Tom Wyner – Ravana
- Richard Cansino – Lakshmana
- Michael Sorich – Hanuman
- Mike Reynolds – Dasharatha
- Tony Pope – Vishvamitra
- Mari Devon – Kaikeyi
- Simon Prescott – Kumbhakarna
- Barbara Goodson – Surpanakha
- Kirk Thornton – Indrajit
- Steve Bulen – Sugriva
- Eddie Frierson – Angada
