= Shahriar Akhter Bulu =

Bangladeshi politician

- শাহরিয়ার আখতার বুলু

Member of Bangladesh Parliament
- In office 2005–2006
- President: A. Q. M. Badruddoza Chowdhury, Iajuddin Ahmed
- Leader: Khaleda Zia
- Preceded by: Mst. Khaleda Khanum
- Succeeded by: Amina Ahmed

Personal details
- Born: Kazi Shahriar Akhter Bulu Shahriar Akhter Bulu Chauddagram Upazila, Cumilla District
- Citizenship: Bangladesh
- Party: Bangladesh Nationalist Party
- Spouse: Kazi Siraj
- Children: Joy Shahriar
- Profession: Academic, Politician

Kazi Shahriar Akhter Bulu (Known as Shahriar Akhtar Bulu) is a Bangladeshi politician from Cumilla District. She served as a member of Jatiya Sangsad from a reserved seat for women.

== Career ==
Bulu was born in Chauddagram, Cumilla. She was elected as a member of 8th Jatiya Sangsad from Reserved Women's Seat 23 as a nominee of Bangladesh Nationalist Party (BNP).

She was elected to parliament from reserved seat as a Bangladesh Nationalist Party candidate in 2005.

== Personal life ==
Her husband Kazi Siraj was a freedom fighter, journalist and columnist. He also served as the convener of Bangladesh Jatiotabadi Swechhasebak Dal. They have one son Joy Shahriar and two daughters.
