= Dhaka Tribune =

Bangladeshi English-language daily newspaper

- Breaking News. Breaking Barriers.
- Type: Daily newspaper
- Format: Broadsheet
- Owner(s): 2A Media Limited, Gemcon Group
- Publisher: Kazi Anis Ahmed
- Editor: Reaz Ahmad
- Founded: 2013
- Language: English
- Headquarters: FR Tower, 8/C Panthpath, Shukrabad, Dhaka 1207.
- Website: dhakatribune.com

The Dhaka Tribune is a Bangladeshi English-language daily newspaper based in Dhaka. It also operates an online Bengali-language site known as the Bangla Tribune. The newspaper publishes op-ed content, with contributions from Bangladeshi and international columnists.

== History ==
The newspaper published its first volume on 19 April 2013. It started out as a broadsheet before going compact on 1st March, 2015. Since 1st May, 2019, it has reverted to broadsheet editions. Since 2015, it has been the official media partner of the Dhaka Literary Festival.

== Owners and staff ==
Gemcon Group is the largest shareholder in the Dhaka Tribune and also owns the University of Liberal Arts Bangladesh (ULAB).

The newspaper's publisher is Kazi Anis Ahmed, a Bangladeshi writer and commentator. His articles have been published in The New York Times, Time, The Guardian, The Daily Beast, Wall Street Journal, Nikkei Asian Review, and Politico. Abu Sayeed Asiful Islam is the paper's associate editor. Its London bureau chief is solicitor Niaz Alam.

The founding and chief editor is Zafar Sobhan, who was named a Young Global Leader in 2005 and a Yale World Fellow in 2008. Sobhan previously worked at The Daily Star for seven years and was the editor of Forum magazine for four years. He has also worked at The Independent, Dhaka Courier, and Shokaler Khobor. Sobhan's columns have been syndicated in publications including The Guardian, The Sunday Guardian, Time, and Outlook.

The business editor at Dhaka Tribune is Esha Aurora, who writes on issues including feminism and discrimination.

== Columnists ==
The paper's columnists include American economist Forrest Cookson, British economist Tim Worstall, Bangladeshi lawyer and historian Umran Chowdhury, Bangladeshi writer Syed Badrul Ahsan, Jordan's Prince Hassan bin Talal, and Bangladeshi climate scientist Saleemul Huq.

== Editorial content ==
The Dhaka Tribune is known for covering Indo-Bangladeshi relations, as well as Bangladeshi relations with the United States and China. The newspaper has published articles advocating for women's rights and LGBTQ rights, featuring articles discussing the decriminalization of LGBTQ rights.

=== Syndicate ===
The newspaper has content sharing agreements with Project Syndicate, The Conversation, and Scroll.in.

=== Rohingya refugees ===
In 2014, Myanmar summoned Bangladesh's ambassador over an article in the Dhaka Tribune calling for a referendum in Rakhine State. The article sparked protests by Buddhist nationalists in Yangon. During the 2017 military crackdown in Myanmar against the Rohingya, the newspaper was part of the English-language media reporting directly from the Bangladesh-Myanmar border. The newspaper has published reports and commentary on Rohingya refugees in Bangladesh.

=== Human rights ===
The newspaper has published articles about human rights issues in Bangladesh, including repealing Section 377 in India, inheritance under Hindu law, and press freedom. On women's issues, the newspaper has reported that 97% of sexual offenses in Bangladesh go unreported, especially those committed against rural women and children.

=== Censorship attempts and defamation claims ===
In 2019, a Dhaka Tribune journalist was arrested and sued under the Digital Security Act for publishing allegedly false and provocative information while reporting on voting irregularities in a by-election. The paper has cited Bangladesh's defamation law as an obstacle to reporting about corruption in the country's security forces. Its editorial in response to a documentary about corruption in the country's army was cited by journalist Tim Sebastian during an interview with Gowher Rizvi, a former Bangladesh governmental advisor on DW.

== See also ==
- List of newspapers in Bangladesh
