= Cultural Journalists' Forum of Bangladesh =

Bangladeshi media organisation

- Abbreviation: CJFB
- Formation: 1999
- Founded at: Bangladesh
- Type: Journalist organization
- Purpose: Working for the welfare of cultural journalists
- Headquarters: Dhaka, Bangladesh
- Services: CJFB Performance Award Distribute
- Official language: Bengali language

The Cultural Journalists' Forum of Bangladesh (CJFB) is an organization of entertainment and cultural journalists in Bangladesh. It was established in 1999 and includes members from the country's leading national newspapers, television channels, and online news portals.

== History ==
CJFB was founded in 1999 to create a platform for cultural journalists to work together and promote cultural reporting in Bangladesh. Since its establishment, the organization has grown to include journalists from different media platforms, including print, television, and online news.

== CJFB Performance Award ==
The Cultural Journalists' Forum of Bangladesh (CJFB) presents the CJFB Performance Award, one of its most prestigious awards, to outstanding performers in Bangladeshi film and music across different categories. The award was first introduced in 2000.

== See also ==
- National Film Awards
- Bachsas Awards
