= Zulfiqer Russell =

Bangladeshi lyricist and journalist (born 1977)

- জুলফিকার রাসেল
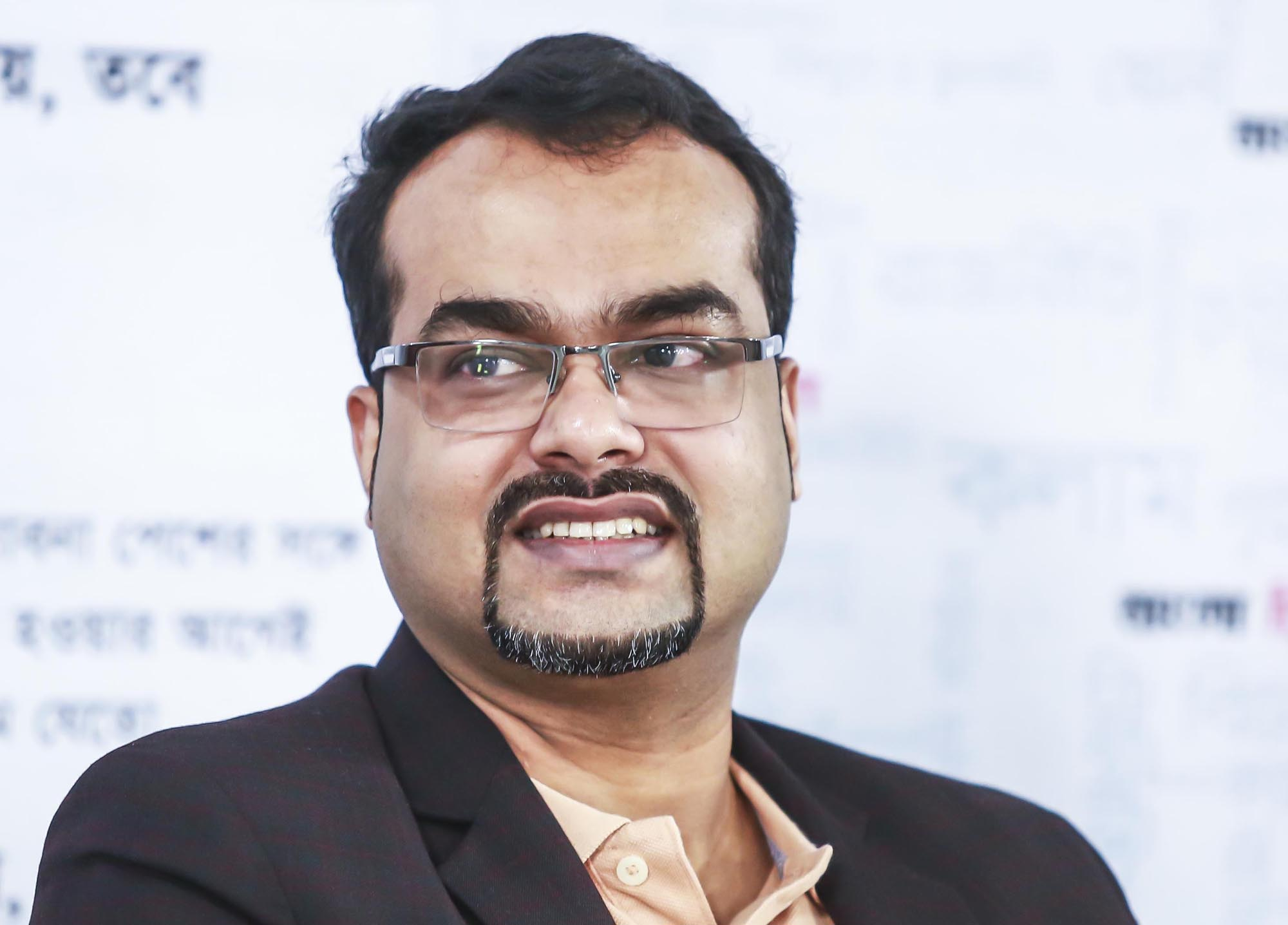
- Born: 13 November 1977 (age 48); Dhaka, Bangladesh
- Education: Dhaka City College
- Occupations: Songwriter; poet; journalist
- Employer: ZuTi LLC
- Known for: Lyricist and journalist
- Notable work: Written the official ICC world cup song O Prithibi Ebar Ese Bangladesh Nao Chine
- Spouse: Tina Russell
- Awards: Bangladesh National Film Award for Best Lyrics (2018); Mirchi Music Awards Bangla (2017); Channel i Music Awards (2008, 2010, 2013, 2022)
- Website: www.zulfiqerrussell.com

Zulfiqer Russell (Bengali: জুলফিকার রাসেল; born 13 November 1977) is a Bangladeshi lyricist and journalist. He served as the editor of the online news portal The Bangla Tribune from 13 May 2014 to 31 January 2026. He won the Bangladesh National Film Award for Best Lyrics for the film Putro (2018). He was the winner of the Channel i Music Awards in 2008, 2010, 2013 and 2022 and also received the Mirchi Music Awards (Bangla) award for the Song of the Year in the Modern Song category for, "Shabuj Chilo". On 2020 he was awarded CJFB Performance Award 2019 as best lyricist. He had also worked with renowned Indian singers and composers including Grammy and Academy Award (Oscar) winner musician A. R. Rahman. He wrote the official theme song 'Ektai Achhe Desh' of the Golden Jubilee of Bangladesh Independence sang by fifty renowned singers of Bangladesh.

== Early life and education ==
Zulfiqer Russell was born on 13 November 1977, in the Dhaka District of Bangladesh. He is the son of Abdus Salam (father) and Saleha Begum (mother). He studied at the Muslim Modern Academy, and graduated from Dhaka City College.

== Career ==
At the beginning of 1993, Russell's poems were featured in a number of publications including Ajker Kagoj. His first poem was "Kofine Ojoggo Purush". He is the only lyricist in Bangladesh who received an appreciation letter from Prime Minister Sheikh Hasina. He wrote the official welcome song "O Prithibi Ebar Ese Bangladesh Nao Chine" for the 2011 ICC Cricket World Cup held in Bangladesh, India, and Sri Lanka. He penned around thousand songs since 1994, many of which were sung by prominent artists. He was one of the top lyricists of the year 2011. Russell served as the editor of the online news portal The Bangla Tribune from 13 May 2014 to 31 January 2026, and has previously written for publications such as The Daily Ittefaq and The Daily Janakantha. He has also worked for Maasranga Television and Bangla newspapers, Daily Amader Shomoy, Ajker Kagoj and Banglabazar Patrika.

In addition to working with fellow Bangladeshi artists, He has also worked with renowned Indian singers and composers including Grammy and Academy Award (Oscar) winner musician A R Rahman, he is the first Bangladeshi lyricist who collaborated with A R Rahman. He also work with Hariharan, Sonu Nigam, Javed Ali, Palak Muchhal, Benny Dayal, Zubin Garg, Nachiketa, Anjan Dutt, Indranil Sen, Rupankar Bagchi, Raghab Chatterjee, Anwesha, Chinmoyee, Iman Chakrabarty. Zulfiqer Russell wrote the official theme song 'Ektai Achhe Desh' of the Golden Jubilee of Bangladesh Independence sang by fifty renowned singers of Bangladesh. He wrote a theme song 'Joy Bangabandhu' in the Hindi language for the state ceremony on the hundred-year celebration of Father of the Nation Bangabandhu Sheikh Mujibur Rahman. This song is composed and sung by Academy award winner A. R. Rahman. Zulfiqer Russell wrote another theme song 'Hoyeche ki Sonar Bangla' for the state ceremony on the hundred-year celebration of Father of the Nation Bangabandhu Sheikh Mujibur Rahman. He places himself as Publicity and Publication Secretary of Music Alliance Bangladesh (Sangeet Oikko Bangladesh).

He is also active in a various organisation like the Lyricists Association of Bangladesh (Geetikobi Shongho) where he places himself as Organizing Secretary. By this platform they want amendments on copyright law to stop the unauthorized use of lyrics.

== Film appearance ==
- Akash Koto Durey, 2013. Director: Samia Zaman

== Discography ==
Released	Album	Artist	Tune/Composition	Music Arrangements	Production Company
January 1997	Onnorokom Valo	Ahmed Faisal	Moni Zaman	Moni Zaman	Sangeeta
December 1999	Akash Chhoa	Shampa Reza	Bappa Mazumder	Bappa Mazumder	Soundtek
December 2001	Ekoi Shohore	Bappa Mazumder & Jewel	Bappa Mazumder	Bappa Mazumder	Soundtek
February 2002	Apekhkhay Theko	Kumar Bishwajit, Baby Naznin, Samina Chowdhury, Kanakchapa, Shampa Reza, Jewel, Bappa Mazumder, Asif & Kaniz Suborna	Bappa Mazumder	Bappa Mazumder	Soundtek
May 2002	Aaj Brishti Namuk	Baby Naznin, Fahmida Nabi, Shampa Reza, Jewel, Biplob, Bappa, Asif, Pancham, Amitav Kaisar	Bappa Mazumder, Biplob, Pancham, Apu	Bappa Mazumder, Biplob, Pancham, Apu	Soundtek
November 2003	Firti Pothey	Jewel	Bappa Mazumder	Bappa Mazumder	Bappa Mazumder
February 2004	Chhelemanushi	Asif, Agoon & Bappa	Bappa Mazumder	Bappa Mazumder	Soundtek
May 2004	Du' Poshla Brishti	Indranil Sen (India) & Bappa Mazumder	Bappa Mazumder	Bappa Mazumder	Soundtek
February 2005	Swapnorani	Asif & Kaniz Suborna	Bappa Mazumder	Bappa Mazumder	Soundtek
April 2005	Ichchhe Korei Ekshathey	Anjan Dutt (India) & Bappa Mazumder	Bappa Mazumder	Bappa Mazumder	Soundtek
January 2006	Aanchor	Fahmida Nabi, Shakila Zafar, Jewel, Tipu, Bappa Mazumder & S I Tutul	Bappa Mazumder, S I Tutul	Bappa Mazumder, S I Tutul	Aarshi, Agnivenna & G Series
September 2007	Abar Pothe Dekha	Anjan Dutt (India), Bappa Mazumder & S I Tutul	Bappa Mazumder, S I Tutul	Bappa Mazumder, S I Tutul	Soundtek
April 2008	Bhango Moner Dana	Bappa Mazumder, Jewel & Indranil Sen (India)	Bappa Mazumder	Bappa Mazumder	Soundtek
September 2008	Kheyal	Bappa Mazumder, S I Tutul & Arnob	Bappa Mazumder, S I Tutul	Bappa Mazumder, S I Tutul	ATN Music
September 2009	Phoring	Fahmida Nabi, Bappa Mazumder, Mahadi & Bishwajit	Bappa Mazumder	Bappa Mazumder	ATN Music
February 2010	Ek Mutho Gaan	Bappa Mazumder & Fahmida Nabi	Bappa Mazumder	Bappa Mazumder	G Series
August 2010	Poroshpor	Samina Chowdhury, Fahmida Nabi, Bappa Mazumder & Rupankar	Bappa Mazumder	Bappa Mazumder	G Series
July 2012	Akash Debo Kaakey	Tareen, Tapan Chowdhury, Raghab, Rupankar & Ibrar Tipu	Joy Sarker, Bappa Mazumder, Rupankar, Ibrar Tipu & Belal Khan	Joy Sarker, Indrajit Dey, Bappa Mazumder, Ibrar Tipu & Mushfiq Litu	G Series
August 2012	Poroshpor-2	Samina Chowdhury, Kumar Bishwajit, Sonu Nigam (India) & Javed Ali (India)	Joy Sarker, Pilu Khan & Rupankar	Joy Sarker & Indrajit Dey	Agniveena & G Series
July 2013	Ichchhe Hoy	Fahmida Nabi	Naquib Khan & Pilu Khan	Tamal Chakrabarty	Agniveena & G Series
October 2013	Cholo Baanchi, Benche Thakar Moto, Type: Soft Melody	Samina Chowdhury	Naquib Khan, Pilu Khan, Rupankar & Raghab	Indrajit Dey & Tamal Chakrabarty	
July 2014	Aaj Ki Brishti Hobe	Tina	Raghab Chatterjee, Ibrar Tipu & Belal Khan	Indrajit Dey & Tamal Chakrabarty	Laser Vision
July 2014	Bari Ferar Tara	Raghab Chatterjee	Raghab Chatterjee	Indrajit Dey & Tamal Chakrabarty	Laser Vision
July 2014	Aaraley	Kanakchapa	Naquib Khan, Moinul Islam Khan & Pilu Khan	Tamal Chakrabarty	Laser Vision
August 2014	Benche Thakar Jonne	Rupankar Bagchi	Rupankar Bagchi	Indrajit Dey	Laser Vision
February 2015	Neel Jhinuker Kham	Fahmida Nabi & Rupankar Bagchi	Rupankar Bagchi	Indrajit Dey	Laser Vision
July 2015	Ekta Bondhu Chai	Samina Chowdhury & Raghab	Raghab Chatterjee	Indrajit Dey & Tamal Chakrabarty	Laser Vision
September 2016	Amar Ichchhe Kothay	Imran & Palak Muchhal	Imran Mahmudul	Imran Mahmudul	Soundtek
June 2017	Benche Thakar Maane	Nachiketa	Nachiketa	Tunai Debasish Ganguly	Aasha Audio
November 2017	Lage Buke Lage	Imran Mahmudul & Anwesshaa	Imran Mahmudul	Imran Mahmudul	Dhruba Music
January 2018	Bhalo Theko	Jayati Chakraborty	Nachiketa	Tunai Debasish Ganguly	Aasha Audio
February 2019	Shesh Din	Tahsan & Tina Russell	Tahsan Khan	Sajid Sarker	CD Choice
December 2019	Keno Eto Bhabcho	Imran & Palak Muchhal	Imran Mahmudul	Imran Mahmudul	Soundtek
December 2020	Chokher Bhetor	Tina Russell	Ridwan Nabi Pancham	Ridwan Nabi Pancham	ZuTi Music
February 2021	Parbo Na	Tina Russell	Tunai Debasish Ganguly	Tunai Debasish Ganguly	ZuTi Music
March 2021	Ektai Ache Desh	Fifty renowned singers of Bangladesh	Sajid Sarkar	Sajid Sarkar	The People's Republic of Bangladesh
March 2021	Amar Shonar Bangla	A R Rahman	A R Rahman	A R Rahman	The People's Republic of Bangladesh
May 2021	Akash Amar Jochona Amar	Pilu Khan	Pilu Khan	RENAISSANCE	Dhruba Music Station
December 2021	Hoyechhe Ki Sonar Bangla	Aditi Mohsin, Sharmin Sultana Sumi, Lincon D Costa & Jahid Nirob	Pavel Areen	Pavel Areen	The People's Republic of Bangladesh
December 2021	Agami 50 (Next50)	Lincon D Costa, Nirob, Masha Islam, Tashfi, Dilshad Nahar Kona, Oyshee, Salman, Innima, Yar Hossain, Shanto, Sagar, Nibir	Pavel Areen	Pavel Areen	Shah Cement
February 2022	Ki Sundor Kore Bolle	Tina Russell	Nachiketa Chakraborty	Imran Mahmudul	Soundtek
February 2022	Jani To Shohoj Noy	Fahmida Nabi	Nachiketa Chakraborty	Ridwan Nabi Pancham	ZuTi Music
February 2022	Chetonar Ekushe Bangla-ke Bhalobeshe	Kona, Nirab, Masha Islam, Dipen Mahajan, Tonu, Yar Hossain, Sagar	Pavel Areen	Pavel Areen	Shah Cement
March 2022	Joy Bangladesh	A R Rahman	A R Rahman	A R Rahman	Bangladesh Cricket Board
March 2022	EktuKhani Kostho Diteo	Samina Chowdhury	Nachiketa Chakraborty	Ridwan Nabi Pancham	ZuTi Music
March 2022	Ichchhe Holei Dio	Imran Mahmudul and Tina Russell	Imran Mahmudul	Imran Mahmudul	Soundtek
December 2022	Bangladesh Awami League (Theme Song)	Pantha Kanai, Chandana Mojumdar, Dilshad Nahar Kona, Masha Islam	Pavel Areen		Office Cell, Bangladesh Awami League
February 2023	Kichhu Nei Jaar	Tina Russell	Bappa Mazumder	Bappa Mazumder	Bee Emmz Workstation
March 2023	FBCCI Theme Song (50 years)	Pantha Kanai, Meer Shahriar Hossain Masum, Tashfee, Abanti Shithi, Nasrin Nasha	Meer Shahriar Hossain Masum	Tanveer Khan	Pop Up
June 2023	Shey Ekta Gaachh	Nachiketa Chakraborty	Nachiketa Chakraborty	Tunai Debasish Ganguly	ZuTi Music
June 2023	Shudhu Bhalobashai Shob No	Iman Chakraborty	Tunai Debasish Ganguly	Tunai Debasish Ganguly	ZuTi Music
September 2023	Ami Bhalo Nei	Samina Chowdhury	Nachiketa Chakraborty	Ridwan Nabi Pancham	ZuTi Music
April 2024	Sanjeeb	Dalchhut	Bappa Mazumder	Dalchhut	Swadhin Music
April 2024	Ekibhabe Din Ashe	Anwesha	Tunai Debasish Ganguly	Tunai Debasish Ganguly	ZuTi Music
September 2025	Eki Bhul Hobe Na Aar	Shovan Ganguly	Tunai Debasish Ganguly	Tunai Debasish Ganguly	ZuTi Music
November 2025	Obujh Pakhi	Zubeen Garg	Tunai Debasish Ganguly	Tunai Debasish Ganguly	ZuTi Music
February 2026	Tumi Bollei	Bappa Mazumder & Tina Russell	Bappa Mazumder	Bappa Mazumder	ZuTi Music

== Awards ==
Year	Award	Category	Outcome
2008	Bangladesh Cultural Reporters Association	Best Lyricist	Won
2008	Citycell-Channel i Music Awards	Best Lyricist	Won
2009	Dhaka Cultural Reporters Unity	Best Lyricist	Won
2010	Citycell-Channel i Music Awards	Best Lyricist	Won
2013	Citycell-Channel i Music Awards	Best Lyricist	Won
2017	Mirchi Music Awards Bangla	Song of the year (Modern song)	Won
2018	Bangladesh National Film Award for Best Lyrics	Best Lyricist	Won
2019	CJFB Performance Award	Best Lyricist	Won
2022	Channel i Music Awards	Best Lyricis (Thematic song)	Won
