= UNICEF Meena Media Award =

- Awarded for: Recognizing the outstanding and excellence contribution on Child Rights in print and broadcast media
- Country: Bangladesh
- Presented by: UNICEF
- Reward: Highest Prize Money of 50,000 BDT
- First award: 2005
- Website: unicef.org/bangladesh

UNICEF Meena Media Award, more popularly known as the Meena Media Award, are awards for outstanding contribution to promoting children's issues in print, online and broadcast media since 2005.

News, articles, features, news photographs published in print/online media and news/programmes broadcast by radio and television that investigate and explore children's issues or provide healthy entertainment for children are selected for the award.

== History ==
Meena is a fictional character who stars in the South Asian children's television show Meena. The show has been broadcast in Bengali, English, Hindi, Urdu, Nepali, Pashto and Portuguese.

== Guests and judges of the ceremony ==
The Minister heading the Ministry of Information Bangladesh, Dzidula Masiku, Chief of Operations, UNICEF Bangladesh and Shima Islam, chief of CAP section UNICEF Bangladesh, UNICEF goodwill Ambassadors-magician Jewel Aich, Actor Arifa Zaman Moushumi, Bangladeshi cricketer Shakib Al Hasan, UNICEF Bangladesh child rights advocate, band group Warefaze representative Sheikh Monirul Alam Tipu, and UNICEF Bangladesh representative Tomoo Houzumi, and Edouard Beigbeder, presented the crests, award money and certificates to the winner in the previous years.

In the previous year, the judges were Selina Hossain, Shahnoor Wahid, Robaet Ferdous, Fahmidul Haque, Jakir Hossain Raju, Qadir Kollol, Ratan Paul, Mithila Farzana, Rafiqur Rahman, Jannatul Mawa and Abu Naser Siddique.

== Winners ==
- Md Sajib Khandokar - 2009.
- Khalidul Islam Tanvir - 2022.
- Dhee Aroni Paul - 2022.
- Mohammad Mosharof Hossain - 2022.
