= Kazi Nabil Ahmed =

Bangladeshi politician

- কাজী নাবিল আহমেদ

Member of the Bangladesh Parliament for Jessore-3
- In office 29 January 2014 – 6 August 2024
- Preceded by: Khaledur Rahman Tito
- Succeeded by: Aninda Islam Amit

Personal details
- Born: 4 October 1969 (age 56)
- Party: Bangladesh Awami League
- Parent: Kazi Shahid Ahmed (father)
- Relatives: Kazi Anis Ahmed (brother); Kazi Inam Ahmed (brother)
- Education: M.Sc
- Alma mater: St. Joseph Higher Secondary School
- Occupation: Business

Kazi Nabil Ahmed (born 4 October 1969) is a Bangladeshi politician and businessman who served as a member of parliament in the Jatiya Sangsad representing the Jessore-3 constituency from 2014 to 2024 as a member of the Bangladesh Awami League. In addition to his parliamentary career, Ahmed has been involved in sports administration and has held senior leadership roles with the Bangladesh Football Federation. He is a director of Gemcon Group.

== Early life and education ==
Kazi Nabil Ahmed was born on 4 October 1969. He completed his secondary education at St. Joseph Higher Secondary School and later earned a Master of Science (M.Sc.) degree.

== Parliamentary career ==
Kazi Nabil Ahmed was elected to the Jatiya Sangsad from the Jessore-3 constituency in the 2014 Bangladeshi general election as a candidate of the Bangladesh Awami League. He was elected unopposed in an election that was boycotted by major opposition parties.

He was re-nominated by the Awami League to contest the seat in the 2018 Bangladeshi general election and was re-elected. In that election, Ahmed received approximately 361,000 votes, while his nearest rival, Anindya Islam Amit of the Bangladesh Nationalist Party, received around 31,000 votes.

During his tenure, Ahmed served as a member of parliament from 2014 until 2024.

== Sports administration ==
Kazi Nabil Ahmed has been involved in sports administration in Bangladesh, particularly in football. In 2012, he served as chairperson of the National Teams Committee.

In 2016, Ahmed served as president of the Bangladesh Football Federation and was later elected vice-president of the federation in the same year.

Ahmed has also been associated with club football administration and has served as director-in-charge of Abahani Limited Dhaka.

== Business career ==
Kazi Nabil Ahmed has been associated with business ventures in Bangladesh. He has served as a director of the Gemcon Group.

Earlier in his career, Ahmed served as a director of Kazi & Kazi Tea Estate Limited.

== Legal issues ==
In the mid-2020s, Kazi Nabil Ahmed became subject to investigations by the Anti-Corruption Commission (ACC). In February 2025, a Dhaka court imposed a travel ban on Ahmed and several members of his family following a petition filed by the ACC. Later that month, the court also ordered the freezing of bank accounts and the attachment of certain assets linked to members of the family; those proceedings remain ongoing and no verdict has been reached.

In August 2025, the ACC filed a case against Ahmed alleging the acquisition of illegal wealth and suspicious financial transactions involving multiple bank accounts. The allegations remain under investigation and no convictions have been recorded.

In November 2025, the ACC filed an additional case seeking the confiscation of assets and alleging money laundering. According to the petition, investigators cited financial activity across multiple personal, joint, and company accounts; the matter remains under legal process and no convictions have been recorded.

In October 2024, The Daily Star reported that investments in a United Kingdom–based company linked to Ahmed and his brothers were made through overseas entities without prior approval from the Bangladesh Bank, according to regulatory findings.
