= Yugo Sako =

Japanese film director, screenwriter, and producer (1928-2012)

- Born: 4 February 1928; Gifu, Gifu Prefecture Japan
- Died: 24 April 2012 (aged 84); Minato, Tokyo, Japan
- Occupations: Director, Screenwriter, Producer

Yugo Sako (酒向雄豪, Sakō Yūgō) (4 February 1928 – 24 April 2012) was a Japanese film director, screenwriter, and producer, known for his work in Ramayana: The Legend of Prince Rama.

== Life and work ==
Yugo Sako, born in Gifu, Japan on February 4, 1928, lost his parents in his very early childhood, and was seemingly predestined to enter the Buddhist priesthood. He was then deeply steeped in the Indian philosophy and ideas as well as in the Zen culture. He had worked with the NHK, Nippon Hoso Kyokai (Japanese Broadcasting Corporation) for over ten years, then became a freelance creator working on television programs, magazines and music.

After his first visit to India in 1970, he had become more fascinated with the country and paid more than 40 visits, producing many documentary films on India. It was a major turning point when he met Dr. B.B. Lal in 1983, who was a noted archaeologist called the reincarnation of Schliemann in India. Yugo Sako was then producing a television documentary- for the Japanese alone with the permission of the government of India- on Dr. Lal's excavation of "Ramayana Relics" in Shringabelapur near Prayagraj in Uttar Pradesh in northern India.

Indian Express, one of the leading national dailies, in its edition of April 25, 1983 carried an article on Sako's work. Soon thereafter, a protest letter based on the misunderstanding from the late Mr. Har Mohan Lall, the secretary general of the Vishva Hindu Parishad, an International Hindu organization, was received by the Japanese Embassy in Delhi, which said that no foreigners could arbitrarily cinematize Ramayana because it was the great national heritage of India. After Mr. Lall's misunderstanding was cleared, however, Sako proposed that Ramayana be made into an animation film for all the people of the earth. Mr. Lall agreed on his idea. Accordingly, the preparations began in the mid-1980s for making Ramayana in animation, the first attempt of its kind. With many difficulties to be surmounted, the film, The Legend of Ramayana, took over a decade to complete.

Yugo Sako died on 24 April 2012 at the age of 84 due to aspiration pneumonia in Minato, Tokyo. At the time of his death, he was working on the story of Lord Krishna, the Celestial Cowherd.
