= Tui Razakar =

Bangladeshi patriotic slogan

Tui Razakar (Bengali: তুই রাজাকার, lit. 'You are a traitor') is a slogan used by Bangladeshis as an expression of patriotism and often used in political speeches and against those who betrayed in the Bangladesh Liberation War.

== Origin ==
In Bangladesh, razakar is used as a pejorative term meaning "traitor" or Judas. This slogan was first used in Bohubrihi, a 1988 TV series written by Humayun Ahmed. A bird chanted the slogan in a scene for the first time from the series. Then the slogan became popular. In the 12th episode of the TV series, Sobhan's brother-in-law tries to teach the phrase "Tui Razakar" to the three parakeets with the help of a tape recorder, after Imdad, who is sheltered in Sobhan's house, mocks the persons who were martyred during the liberation war. Two of the three birds die, but the last parakeet learns to say the phrase. The TV series aired during the dictatorship of Hussain Muhammad Ershad when no one was free to speak against the Razakars.

== Usage ==
People's hatred towards Razakars grew after the slogan became popular. Then in December 1991, a news article titled after the slogan was published in Ajker Kagoj. The article briefly described the war crimes committed by the Razakars in 1971. The article also had a cartoon by Shishir Bhattacharjee. The slogan was again used in 2013 Shahbag protests to protest against the life imprisonment of Abdul Quader Molla, who served as a Razakar in the 1971 war, as punishment for crimes against humanity.

== Significance ==
Partha Pratim Bhattacharya of The Daily Star said of the slogan, "...the parakeet was portrayed as a symbol of the stifled voice of a nation trapped in the net of censorship and the trained bird would take the opportunity to say 'Tui Razakar'. A word that could not be said through it was cleverly brought in front of everyone". According to Selina Hossain, Humayun Ahmed assisted the people of the country unite against war criminals by teaching them the slogan through the TV series.

== See also ==
- Razakar slogans
