= Kazi Anis Ahmed =

Bangladeshi writer, publisher, businessman and co-founder Dhaka Tribune

K. Anis Ahmed
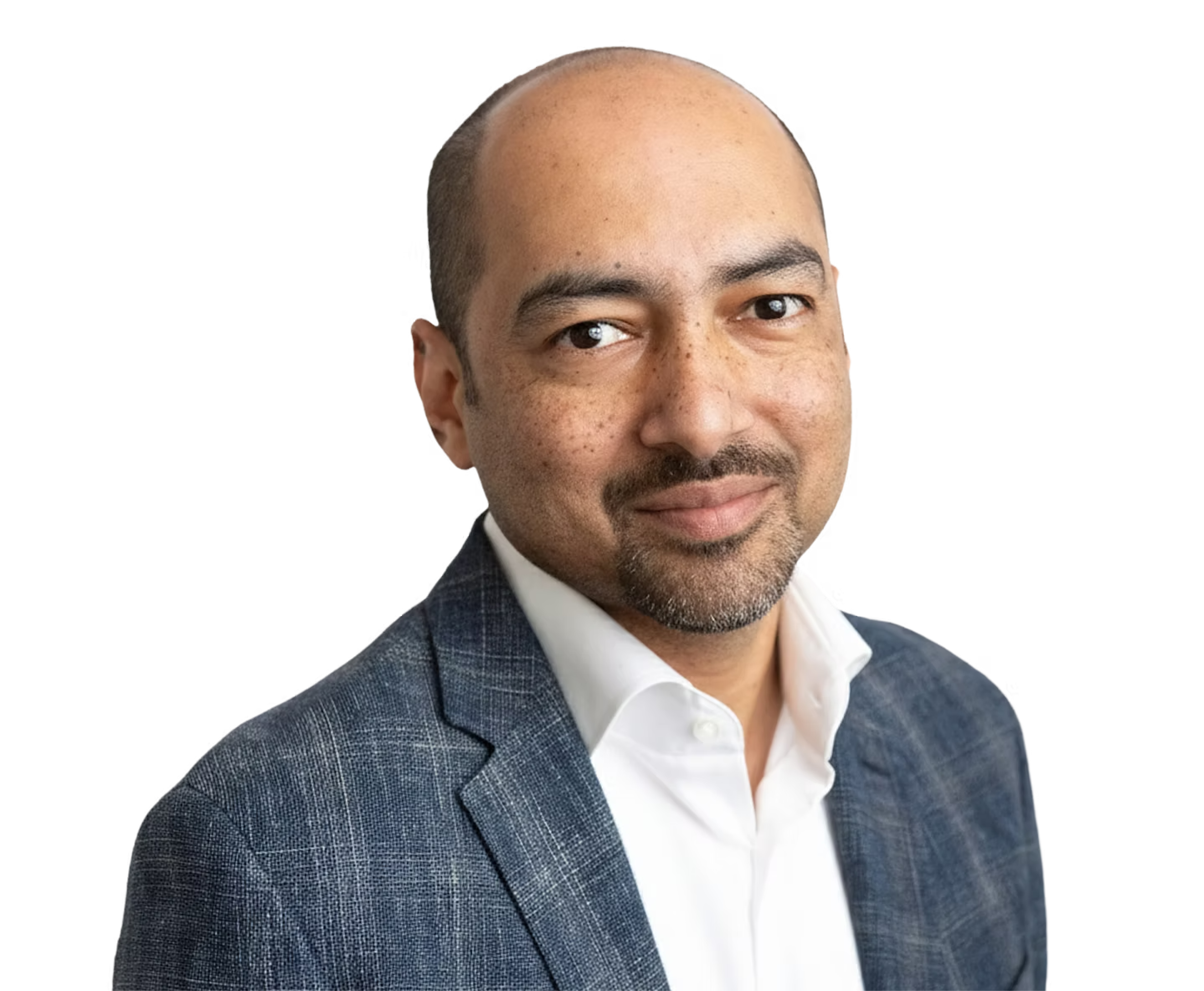
- K. Anis Ahmed in 2024
- Born: 1970 (age 55–56); Dhaka, Bangladesh
- Father: Kazi Shahid Ahmed
- Relatives: Kazi Nabil Ahmed (brother); Kazi Inam Ahmed (brother)
- Website: https://www.kanisahmed.co/

K. Anis Ahmed (Bengali:কাজী আনিস আহমেদ) is a Bangladeshi writer and publisher. He is the author of four works of fiction, including Carnivore (HarperCollins UK, 2025). He is the co-founder and publisher of the English-language daily newspaper Dhaka Tribune and the online news portal Bangla Tribune. He is also a co-founder and President of the Board of Trustees of the University of Liberal Arts Bangladesh.

== Early life and education ==
K. Anis Ahmed was born in Dhaka, Bangladesh (then East Pakistan) on 26 September 1970. His father, Kazi Shahid Ahmed, was the founder and chairman of the Gemcon Group, and also a writer and novelist in the Bengali language.

K. Anis Ahmed passed secondary school from St. Joseph Higher Secondary School, Dhaka. He went to Brown University for higher education. He has completed his PhD in comparative literature from NYU.

== Career ==
=== Writings ===
Ahmed's first collection of short stories, Good Night, Mr. Kissinger, was published by The University Press Limited in Bangladesh and launched at the Hay Festival Dhaka, Bangladesh, in 2012. Ahmed's first novel, The World in My Hands, was published by Random House India in December 2013. The book is a political satire that charts the fate of two friends – a newspaper editor and a successful property developer – whose relationship is bitterly tested when they find themselves on opposite sides of a crisis that upends their country's social order. An early work of Ahmed's, Forty Steps (3 novella), has been published in a bi-lingual edition by Bengal Lights. It was translated into Bengali by renowned translator Manabendra Bandyopadhyay.

In June 2025, Ahmed's novel Carnivore was published by HarperCollins UK. The book is set in New York’s high‑end restaurant world and follows a chef’s ruthless rise to the top.

Ahmed has contributed to international newspapers and journals such as The New York Times, TIME, The Guardian, Daily Beast, Wall Street Journal, and Nikkei Asian Review, as well as Politico. He has co-curated special issues on Bangladesh in the literary journals Wasafiri and Granta. He wrote the opening essay for the Puterbaugh essay series in World Literature Today in December 2015 and was published in the Journal of Asian Studies in 2018.

=== Business ===
Ahmed is a Director of the Gemcon Group, which was founded by his father, Kazi Shahed Ahmed, 1979. He has worked among other projects, for the Kazi and Kazi Tea Estate, Ltd. (KKTE). Ahmed steered KKTE to emerge as the first successful organic tea estate in Bangladesh. He is co-founder of the Teatulia brand of Kazi and Kazi Tea, which sells in the USA, UK, Japan, China and other markets.

He is a co-founder of University of Liberal Arts Bangladesh and the Vice-President of the Board of Trustees of the same university.

=== Publishing ===
Ahmed is also publisher of the English-language daily newspaper Dhaka Tribune, the Bengali-language online newspaper Bangla Tribune and the literary journal Bengal Lights. Ahmed contributes to international newspapers and journals such as The New York Times, TIME, The Guardian, Daily Beast, Wall Street Journal, and Nikkei Asian Review, and Politico. He has co-curated special issues on Bangladesh in the literary journals Wasafiri and Granta. He wrote the opening essay for the Puterbaugh essay series in World Literature Today in December 2015 and was published in the Journal of Asian Studies in 2018. Kazi Anis Ahmed, a writer and publisher of English daily Dhaka Tribune and online news portal Bangla Tribune, served two terms as president of PEN Bangladesh — an international organization of writers, bloggers, and journalists.

== Books ==
- Good Night, Mr. Kissinger (University Press Limited, 2012; Unnamed Press, 2014), ISBN 978-1-939419-04-0
- The World in My Hands (Random House India, 2013)
- Forty Steps (Bengal Lights, 2014)
- Carnivore (HarperCollins UK, 2025)

== See also ==
- List of Bangladeshi writers
- Bangladeshi English literature
