= CJFB Performance Award =

Bangladeshi film and music award

- Current: 21st CJFB Performance Awards
- Awarded for: Outstanding performers in Bangladeshi film and music
- Sponsored by: Cultural Journalists' Forum of Bangladesh
- Location: Dhaka, Bangladesh
- Country: Bangladesh
- First award: 2000

CJFB Performance Award is a Bangladeshi film and music award made by the Cultural Journalists' Forum of Bangladesh.

The award started in 2000 and it was held for the 16th time on 19 December 2016 at Basundhara Convention City Hall, Dhaka. It is sponsored by Uro, a beverage company. It is sometimes described as Uro-Cola CJFB Performance Award.

The COVID-19 pandemic affected film screenings and awards shows. The 19th award ceremony, for works released in 2019, took place online in July 2020. The 20th award ceremony, once again in person, was held at the Bangabandhu International Conference Center on 24 December 2021.

== Categories ==
(Some categories are irregular)

- Best Film
- Best Director
- Best Actor
- Best Actress
- Best Male Singer
- Best Female Singer
- Best Music Director
- Best Lyrics
- Best Pop Singer
- Best Debut Singer
- Best Television Actor
- Best Television Actress
- Most Popular Television Artist
- Best Television Director
- Best Advertisement Director
- Best Male Model
- Best Female Model
- Lifetime Achievement Award
- Special Award (music)
- Special Award (journalism)
- Best Event Organizer
- Best YouTube Channel
- Best YouTuber
- Popular Streaming Platform

== Ceremonies ==
- 1st CJFB Performance Award
- 2nd CJFB Performance Award
- 3rd CJFB Performance Award
- 4th CJFB Performance Award
- 5th CJFB Performance Award
- 6th CJFB Performance Award
- 7th CJFB Performance Award
- 8th CJFB Performance Award
- 9th CJFB Performance Award
- 10th CJFB Performance Award
- 11th CJFB Performance Award
- 12th CJFB Performance Award
- 13th CJFB Performance Award
- 14th CJFB Performance Award
- 15th CJFB Performance Award
- 16th CJFB Performance Award
- 17th CJFB Performance Award
- 18th CJFB Performance Award
- 19th CJFB Performance Award
- 20th CJFB Performance Award
- 21st CJFB Performance Award

== Notable recipients ==
Winners have included:

- Mehazabien Chowdhury
- Nusraat Faria
- Hridoy Khan
- Shakib Khan
- Imran Mahmudul
- Pori Moni
- Tanjin Tisha
