= Ajker Kagoj =

Bengali defunct daily newspaper

The Daily Ajker Kagoj
- Type: Daily newspaper
- Format: Broadsheet
- Publisher: Kazi Shahid Ahmed
- Founded: 1991
- Ceased publication: 2007
- Language: Bengali
- Headquarters: Dhaka

Ajker Kagoj (Bengali: আজকের কাগজ, lit. 'Today's Paper') was a daily Bengali-language newspaper published from Dhaka, Bangladesh. The newspaper was launched in 1991 under the editorship of Naimul Islam Khan. Since 1992, Kazi Shahid Ahmed was the editor and publisher till the newspaper announced its closure in 2007.

== Publication highlights ==
In the 1980s, 'Saptahik Khaborer Kagoj', also published by Kazi Shahid Ahmed, became a popular weekly for its firm stand in favour of the masses during the Movement against the Autocrat. Soon after the fall of the autocrat, hence, the 'Ajker Kagoj' emerged as a daily to follow in the footsteps of its predecessor. Naimul Islam Khan was appointed the first editor of the daily Ajker Kagoj. After his departure, Kazi Shahid Ahmed himself edited the paper from 1992 until it finally stopped going to print. "You are a betrayer", in Bengali Tui Rajakar was one of the famous comic strips published in Ajker Kagoj. It had raised its voice against Ghulam Azam, when the government tried to renew his Bangladeshi Citizenship. During that time, government stopped public advertisement fund for the newspaper.

== Press intimidation ==
On 10 July 2004, an Ajker Kagoj reporter received a death threat describing him and the newspaper as an "enemy of Islam" and warning that he would be "killed within a month." On 22 August 2004, Kamal Hossain, another reporter from the newspaper, was murdered while collecting data for a story on organized crime in the south-eastern town of Manikchhari. Ajker Kagoj was able to create a roar among the readers with the style of language used and its editorial policy. In an article published in the newspaper in 1994, educationist and writer Syed Manzoorul Islam stated that the following reasons had caused the newspaper to stand apart from its contemporaries:

- The tendency to break tradition
- The makeup of its reports, pages, columns
- Its youth – those who had visited its offices during its early years knew how much it had drawn on the strength of its young reporters.
- Its two-page spread that was home for reports on political, social, economic, and other issues.
- Its direct engagement with the notions and ideologies of the different strata in society.
- Providing specific definition to newspaper columns

The Tui Razakar cartoon series published in Ajker Kagoj helped to unmask the fundamentalist quarters in Bangladesh among thousands of youngsters in the early 1990s. The newspaper became predominantly vocal against repeated efforts made by the Bangladesh Nationalist Party (BNP) government to reinstate Golam Azam as a citizen of the country. The newspaper had proven its commitment to not compromise as a pro‑liberation force during the country's most trying times.

== Closed ==
Ajker Kagoj was shut down on 20 September 2007 as a result of continued financial difficulties. In a statement, editor Kazi Sahed Ahmad announced all of the newspaper's 225 journalists and other staffers would receive their salary and arrears, which was maintained afterward.

== See also ==
- List of newspapers in Bangladesh
- List of journalists killed in Bangladesh
- Amader Shomoy
