= Bangla Tribune =

Bangladeshi news website

- All news in minimum words
- Type: Online newspaper
- Format: Mobile & Web
- Owner: 2A Media Limited
- Publisher: Kazi Anis Ahmed
- Editor: Zulfiqer Russell
- Founded: 13 May 2014; 12 years ago
- Language: Bengali
- Headquarters: FR Tower, 8/C Panthpath, Shukrabad
- City: Dhaka
- Country: Bangladesh
- Sister newspapers: Dhaka Tribune
- Website: www.banglatribune.com

Bangla Tribune is a Bengali language news website of Bangladesh. It started its journey on 13 May 2014. It's edited by Zulfiqer Russell and published by Kazi Anis Ahmed. As of July 2021, its Alexa ranking was #16 in Bangladesh and #3,064 globally. The website covers a wide range of topics, including politics, business, entertainment, sports, and technology. It also features a variety of columnists and opinion writers who provide their perspectives on current events.

== History ==
Bangla Tribune along with Dhaka Tribune, a national English-language daily broadsheet of Bangladesh are owned by 2A Media Limited. As a concern of Gemcon Group and Kazi Anis Ahmed is the publisher of both newspapers. Its slogan says "All news in minimum words" (in Bengali: "Alpa Khotai Shob Khota").

== Recognition ==
Reporters of Bangla Tribune have received multiple accolades for their anti-drug reports. In 2007, Shafiqul Islam received the Progga Tobacco Control Journalism Award. In 2015, Udisa Islam received the Prothom Alo Best Anti-Drug Report for her anti-drug reporting. In 2021, Sazzad Hossain received the first Online Photojournalist Of The Bangladesh Press Council Award.

== Notable staff ==
- Zulfiqer Russell – Editor of Bangla Tribune "Editor: Zulfiqer Russell". Bangla Tribune.
- Kazi Anis Ahmed – Publisher of Bangla Tribune "Publisher: Kazi Anis Ahmed". Bangla Tribune.
- Masood Kamal – Head of News, Bangla Tribune "Masood Kamal – Head of News at Bangla Tribune". Wikipedia.
- Syed Badrul Ahsan – Regular columnist at Bangla Tribune "Syed Badrul Ahsan – Contributor". Wikipedia.
- Zafar Sobhan – Founding editor of Dhaka Tribune (Bangla Tribune's parent English publication) "Zafar Sobhan – Founding Editor". Wikipedia.

== See also ==
- List of newspapers in Bangladesh
- Bengali-language newspapers
- Dhaka Tribune
- Banglanews24.com
- RTV (Bangladeshi TV channel)
