= List of University of Dhaka people =

Alumni of university

This is a list of University of Dhaka alumni and faculty members.

== Academia, education, and research ==
=== Humanities and social sciences ===
==== Bangla language and literature ====
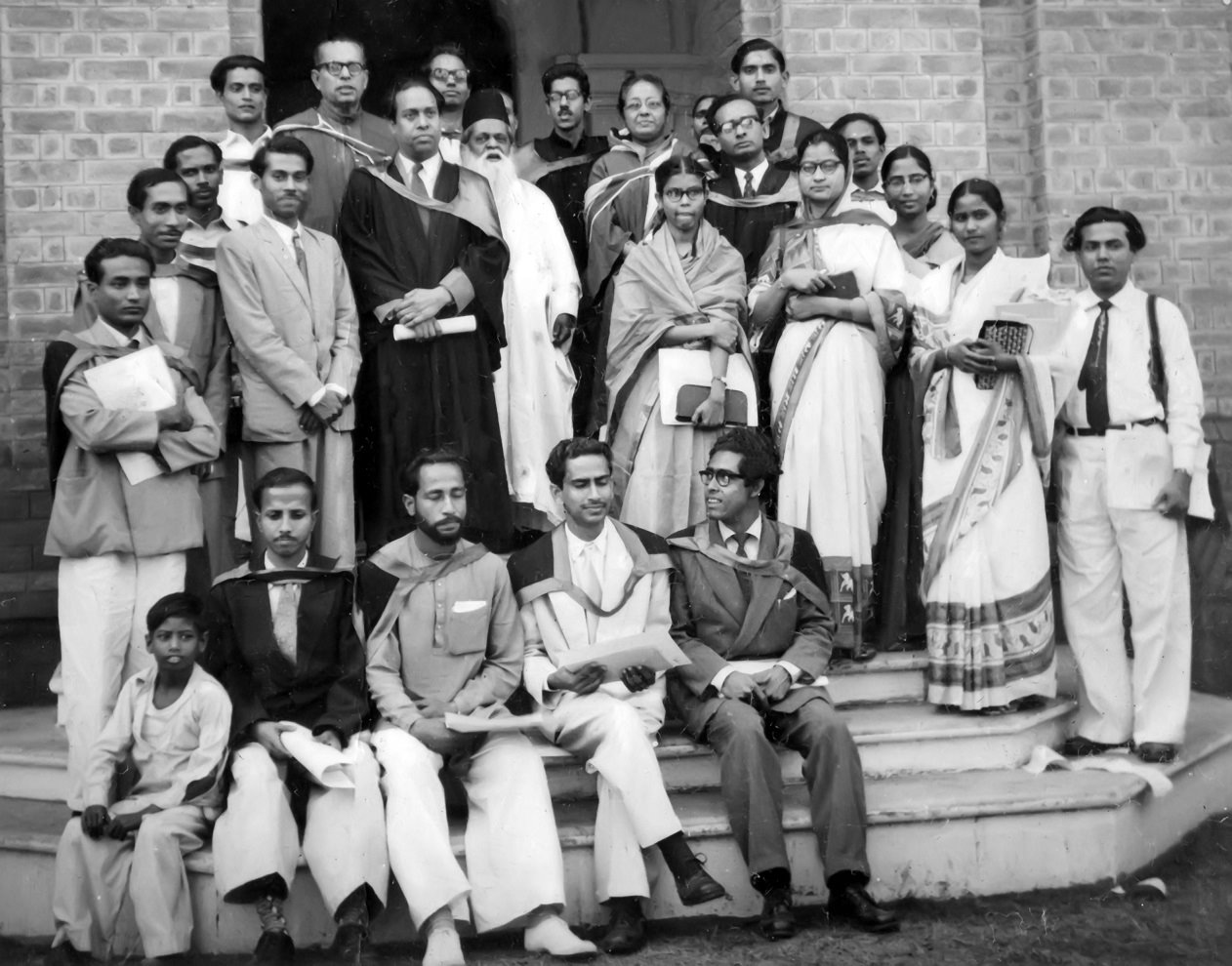
The Department of Bengali Language and Literature alumni, which includes: Muhammad Shahidullah, Munier Choudhury, Anisuzzaman, Nilima Ibrahim, Mufazzal Haider Chaudhury, Ahmed Sharif, Abdul Hye among others.

- Ahmed Sharif, academic, essayist
- Anisuzzaman, academic, professor
- Biswajit Ghosh, academic
- Farhad Mazhar, writer, social and human rights activist, and environmentalist
- Hayat Mamud, academic, essayist, poet.
- Humayun Azad, poet, novelist, essayist, humanist-thinker, public intellectual, and academic
- Laila Nur, Bangladeshi language-movement activist and academic
- Mohammad Azam, academic and the incumbent Director-General of Bangla Academy
- Mostak Sharif, Bangladeshi author, academic, researcher and librarian
- Muhammad Shahidullah, educator, writer, philologist, and linguist
- Principal Abul Kashem, author, politician, educator, pioneer of the Language Movement
- Rajib Humayun, linguist, playwright and academic
- Salimullah Khan, author, essayist, thinker, public intellectual
- Saymon Zakaria, folklore studies researcher
- Soumitra Sekhar Dey, linguist, academic

==== Economics, finance, and business studies ====
- ABM Bazlur Rahman, Bangladeshi economist and development practitioner
- Amiya Kumar Dasgupta, notable Indian economist.
- Anisur Rahman, Bangladeshi economist known for work on participatory development
- Aslam Anis, Bangladeshi health economist and academic specializing in public health economics
- Atiur Rahman, Bangladeshi economist and former Governor of Bangladesh Bank
- Badiul Alam Majumdar, Bangladeshi economist and governance specialist, Secretary of Citizens for Good Governance (SHUJAN)
- Bayazid Sarker, Bangladeshi economist and academic
- Bazlul Haque Khondker, Bangladeshi economist and professor known for work on economic modeling and public policy
- Hossain Zillur Rahman, Bangladeshi economist and former Adviser to the Caretaker Government of Bangladesh
- Iftekharuzzaman, Bangladeshi economist and governance expert, Executive Director of Transparency International Bangladesh
- Kamal Uddin Siddiqui, Bangladeshi economist
- Khan Ahmed Sayeed Murshid, Bangladeshi economist and former Director General of BIDS
- Khondkar Ibrahim Khaled, Bangladeshi economist, banker, and former Deputy Governor of Bangladesh Bank
- Lutfar Rahman Sarkar, Bangladeshi economist and former Governor of Bangladesh Bank
- M. Hafizuddin Khan, Bangladeshi economist and former Comptroller and Auditor General of Bangladesh
- M Niaz Asadullah, Bangladeshi development economist focusing on education and labor markets
- Mohammad Shahid Alam, Pakistani economist, academic, and social scientist.
- M Syeduzzaman, Bangladeshi economist and former Finance Minister of Bangladesh
- Muhammad Fouzul Kabir Khan, Bangladeshi economist and former secretary in the Government of Bangladesh
- Muinul Islam, Bangladeshi economist and academic specializing in macroeconomics and development
- Nurul Islam, Bangladeshi economist and former Deputy Chairman of the Planning Commission of Bangladesh
- Qazi Kholiquzzaman Ahmad, Bangladeshi development economist and former chairman of PKSF
- Shah Abdul Hannan, Bangladeshi economist, civil servant, and former secretary of the Government of Bangladesh
- S. M. Mahfuzur Rahman, Bangladeshi economist and former secretary of the Government of Bangladesh
- Syed Abdus Samad, Bangladeshi economist and academic
- Zaid Bakht, Bangladeshi economist and former Research Director at the Bangladesh Institute of Development Studies (BIDS)
- Zaidi Sattar, Bangladeshi economist and Chairman of the Policy Research Institute of Bangladesh

==== English language and literature ====
- Azfar Hussain, academic, writer, and activist
- Ehsan H. Feroz, professor, researcher and author
- Fakrul Alam, translator, academic
- Firdous Azim, academic, literary critic
- Kaiser Haq, translator, critic and academic.
- Khondakar Ashraf Hossain, postmodernist[1] poet, essayist, translator, and editor.
- Niaz Zaman, academic, writer
- Rashid Askari, bilingual writer, academic, 12th Vice Chancellor of Islamic University, Kushtia and former Director General, Bangla Academy.

==== History and philosophy ====
- Akhtar Imam, philosopher, academic, social activist.
- Govinda Chandra Dev, professor of philosophy at University of Dhaka
- Gowher Rizvi, historian, academic
- Hasna Begum, philosopher and feminist.
- Muntassir Mamoon, historian, author, translator and professor
- R.C. Majumdar, historian and vice-chancellor of Dacca University
- Sardar Fazlul Karim, academic, philosopher, and essayist
- Sirajul Islam, historian
- Taj Hashmi, academic and writer

==== Islamic studies and theology ====
- Abdul Halim Bukhari, scholar, educator, and Director General of Al Jamia Al Islamia Patiya.
- Abu Nasr Waheed, educationist, first head of the Department of Arabic and Islamic Studies
- Muhammad Asadullah Al-Ghalib, reformist Islamic scholar, academic, writer and leader of the religious organisation Ahle Hadith Andolon Bangladesh
- Qazi Mu'tasim Billah, former professor at the faculty of Islamic studies
- Sayed Moazzem Hossain, academic, Islamic scholar, 6th vice-chancellor of the University of Dhaka

==== Law and jurisprudence ====
- Asif Nazrul, Bangladeshi professor of law, recognized for political commentary.
- Muhammad Ekramul Haque, Bangladeshi legal scholar and academic, known for his contributions to constitutional law and legal education in Bangladesh.
- Ridwanul Hoque, a leading authority on Bangladeshi and South Asian constitutional law.
- Sumaiya Khair, Bangladeshi academic and legal scholar, noted for her research on family law, gender justice, and human rights.

==== Multidisciplinary / general education ====
- Abdul Haque Faridi, educator, lecturer and writer
- Abdul Khaleque, educator and translator
- Abdur Razzaq, academic and educator
- Husne Ara Kamal, academic, professor, author, and social worker
- Shireen Akbar MBE, Indian-born British educator and artist

==== Political science, government, public policy and public administration ====
- Abdul Rashid Moten, Bangladeshi political scientist specializing in political theory and comparative politics
- Ali Riaz, Bangladeshi political scientist known for work on democracy, elections, and South Asian politics
- Dilara Choudhury, Bangladeshi political scientist and academic focusing on governance and public policy
- Mubashar Hasan, Bangladeshi political scientist researching political Islam, development, and state–society relations
- Rounaq Jahan, political scientist
- Talukder Moniruzzaman, Bangladeshi political scientist noted for contributions to the study of political development and public administration

==== Sociology and anthropology ====
- A. K. Nazmul Karim, Bangladeshi sociologist and academic known for foundational contributions to sociology in Bangladesh
- A. S. M. Amanullah, Bangladeshi sociologist specializing in urban sociology and social development
- Md. Mashiur Rahman, Bangladeshi sociologist and academic

=== Science and technology ===
==== Chemistry ====
Abdus Suttar Khan, distinguished aerospace researcher

- Abdus Suttar Khan, aerospace researcher of NASA and Fellow of the Royal Society of Chemistry, Great Britain
- Abul Hussam, inventor of the SONO filter for arsenic removal
- Fazlul Halim Chowdhury, chemist, educationalist, ex-Vice Chancellor of the University of Dhaka
- Mafizuddin Ahmed, first vice-chancellor of Jahangirnagar University
- Sasanka Chandra Bhattacharyya, natural product chemist, Shanti Swarup Bhatnagar laureate

==== Other science and technology ====
- Abdul Karim, soil scientist.
- Abdullah-Al-Muti Sharfuddin, scientist and science writer
- Abdul Majed Khan, Bangladeshi-New Zealander academic, researcher, and activist
- Abul Kalam Azad Chowdhury, chairman of University Commission of Bangladesh, former vice-chancellor of University of Dhaka
- Bhagawan Koirala, cardiothoracic surgeon
- Fazlur Rahman Khan, pioneering structural engineer and architect; contributed to modern skyscraper design technology; works include Sears Tower and John Hancock Center
- M. Anwar Hossain, biochemist, vice-chancellor of Jahangirnagar University, 2012-
- Mir Masoom Ali, George and Frances Ball Distinguished Professor Emeritus of Statistics, Ball State University
- Mizan Rahman, mathematician, author of the standard work of choice in the field of Basic Hypergeometric Series
- Shah M. Faruque, director of the Centre for Food and Water Borne Diseases at the International Centre for Diarrhoeal Disease Research, Bangladesh
- S.M. Ullah, soil scientist and environmentalist who researched arsenic contamination with the Seibersdorf Research Center, Austria
- Tirukkannapuram Vijayaraghavan, mathematician, co-discoverer of Pisot–Vijayaraghavan number
- Zeba Islam Seraj, scientist known for her research in developing salt-tolerant rice varieties suitable for growth in the coastal areas of Bangladesh

==== Physics ====
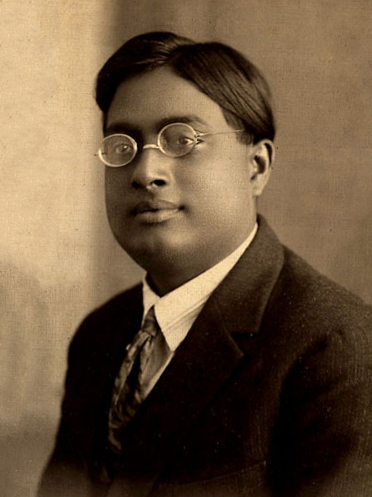
Satyendra Nath Bose FRS, Bengali Physicist, best known for providing the foundation for Bose-Einstein statistics and the theory of the Bose-Einstein condensate

- Abdul Matin Chowdhury, physicist, ex-vice chancellor, University of Dhaka, member, Nobel Committee for Physics
- A. B. M. Obaidul Islam, physicist
- A. M. Harun-ar-Rashid, physicist, author of many physics books
- Fazley Bary Malik, professor of theoretical nuclear and atomic physics at Southern Illinois University Carbondale
- Hiranmay Sen Gupta, chairman and professor at physics department at University of Dhaka
- Kariamanickam Srinivasa Krishnan, FRS, co-discoverer of the Raman Effect in physics
- Khondkar Siddique-e-Rabbani, physicist
- M. A. Wazed Miah, physicist
- Miftahur Rahman, physicist
- M Innas Ali, physicist, founder of the Bangladesh Atomic Energy Commission
- Mohammad Ataul Karim, executive vice chancellor and provost of the University of Massachusetts Dartmouth; IEEE Fellow
- Mohammad Sajjad Alam, Pakistani particle physicist
- M. Shamsher Ali, nuclear scientist and educator
- Satyendra Nath Bose, FRS, Indian physicist, quantum statistician in the early 1920s
- Shamima Choudhury, physicist
- Sultana N. Nahar, physicist and astronomer

=== Leadership ===
- AKM Nurul Islam, Professor - Bangla Department, Chittagong University
- Bazlul Chowdhury, vice-chancellor of Independent University, Bangladesh
- Imran Rahman, vice-chancellor of the University of Liberal Arts Bangladesh
- Maqbular Rahman Sarkar, tenth vice-chancellor of Rajshahi University
- Md. Hasibur Rashid, 5th vice chancellor of Begum Rokeya University, Rangpur
- M Harunur Rashid, archaeologist, educationist, and museum curator
- Mohammad Noman, vice-chancellor of Jahangirnagar University
- Momtaz Begum, academic and educator
- M Osman Ghani, scientist, educationist, and academic, 11th vice-chancellor of the University of Dhaka
- Muhammad Abdul Bari, linguist, academic, and vice-chancellor of Rajshahi University.
- Nakib Muhammad Nasrullah, Vice Chancellor of Islamic University.
- Nurul Alam Khan, academic, professor
- Syed Abul Kalam Azad, former treasurer of University of Dhaka
- Wahiduddin Ahmed, 3rd vice-chancellor of Bangladesh University of Engineering and Technology

== Arts, culture, and literature ==
=== Literary figures ===
==== Poets ====
- Abdul Quadir, poet, awarded Ekushey Padak (1976) and Independence Day Award (1983)
- Abdul Mannan Syed, poet, author and researcher
- Abu Hena Mustafa Kamal, songwriter of contemporary Bengali, poet, essayist, critic and presenter
- Abu Zafar Obaidullah, poet and civil servant
- Abul Hasan, poet
- Ahmed Sofa, poet, novelist, writer, critic, translator and intellectual
- Asad Chowdhury, poet, writer, translator and journalist
- Buddhadeb Bosu, Bengali poet and novelist of the mid-twentieth century
- Helal Hafiz, poet
- Kaiser Haq, poet, translator, essayist, critic and academic
- Khondakar Ashraf Hossain, poet, essayist, translator and editor from Bangladesh
- Rafiq Azad, poet
- Rudra Mohammad Shahidullah, poet
- Sayeem Rana, poet, researcher, musicologist, music director, National Film Award 2014
- Shamsur Rahman, Bengali poet, columnist and journalist
- Syed Ali Ahsan, poet and author
- Jasimuddin, poet
- Daud Haider, exiled poet
- Shamim Azad, poet

==== Novelists and fiction writers ====
- Abul Fazal, novelist and educationist
- Akhteruzzaman Elias, novelist and short-story writer
- Anwar Pasha, author of 'Rifle, Roti, Awrat (1971), the first novel set on the Bangladesh War of Independence, murdered by Pakistani Army and local collaborators on 14 December 1971 (Martyred Intellectuals Day)
- Hasnat Abdul Hye, writer and novelist
- Hosne Ara Shahed, Bengali writer and educationist
- Humayun Ahmed, Bengali novelist, short-story writer and filmmaker
- Humayun Azad, Bengali novelist, poet, essayist and professor
- Muhammed Zafar Iqbal, popular sci-fi writer
- Qazi Anwar Hussain, author, publisher and translator
- Qazi Motahar Hossain, author, scientist, statistician and journalist
- Rashid Askari, Bengali-English writer, academic, columnist, fictionist, translator and the 12th Vice Chancellor of Islamic University, Bangladesh
- Shahidul Zahir, novelist and short-story writer
- Shahidullah Kaiser, Bengali novelist and Dhaka University professor, murdered by Pakistani Army and local collaborators on 14 December 1971 (Martyred Intellectuals Day)
- Shahriar Kabir, novelist, journalist, filmmaker and human rights activist
- Syed Manzoorul Islam, academic, writer, novelist, translator, columnist, and critic
- Taslima Nasrin, atheist writer
- Zahir Raihan, filmmaker and noted novelist and short-story writer
- Shahnaz Munni, journalist and fiction writer
- Shaheen Akhtar, writer
- Rashid Haider, novelist

==== Playwrights and theater writers ====
- Abdullah Al Mamun, playwright, actor and filmmaker
- AKM Bazlul Karim, theater personality
- Munier Choudhury, playwright
- Nurul Momen, playwright, director, belles letters writer, satirist, personal essayist, lawyer
- Ramendu Majumdar, actor, stage director and theater producer and president of the International Theatre Institute
- Sayeed Ahmed, playwright
- Selim Al Deen, notable playwright
- Sadhana Ahmed, playwright and screenwriter
- Rajib Humayun, linguist, Nazrul researcher, playwright, and educator
- ANM Bazlur Rashid, educationist
- SM Haroon-or-Rashid, dramatist
- Falguni Hamid, playwright, actress, director
- M Hamid, dramatist and theater personality
- Mamunur Rashid, playwright, actor, and theater personality.
- Zia Haider, playwright, poet

==== Critics and essayists ====
- Ahmed Sofa, poet, novelist, writer, critic, translator and intellectual
- Fakrul Alam, academic, writer, and translator
- Ghulam Murshid, author, researcher and journalist
- Kabir Chowdhury, academic, essayist, materialist, translator
- Khondakar Ashraf Hossain, poet, essayist, translator and editor from Bangladesh
- Serajul Islam Choudhury, literary critic, public intellectual, social analyst, historian, editor, and professor emeritus
- Syed Abul Maksud, author, columnist, research scholar, and essayist

=== Performing arts ===
==== Actors and actresses ====
- Abdul Kader, actor.
- Aly Zaker, actor, director, businessman and Bangladeshi freedom fighter
- Azizul Hakim, actor
- Bhanu Bandopadhyay, Indian actor and comedian, known for his work in Bengali cinema, acting in numerous plays and performed frequently on the radio
- Bipasha Hayat, actress
- Bulbul Ahmed, actor
- Chanchal Chowdhury, actor
- Dino Shafeek, Bengali actor based in the United Kingdom
- Ferdous Ahmed, actor
- Ferdousi Mazumder, actress
- Golam Mustafa, actor
- Ilias Kanchan, actor and road-safety activist
- Ramendu Majumdar, actor, stage director and theater producer and President of the International Theatre Institute
- Sara Zaker, theater and television actor, entrepreneur and social activist
- Suborna Mustafa, television and film actress
- Tazin Ahmed, actress·
- Bijori Barkatullah, actress
- Rafiath Rashid Mithila, actress, singer, and television-host.
- Intekhab Dinar, actor
- Mahfuz Ahmed, Actor
- Afsana Mimi, actress, and director
- Pran Roy, actor
- Shahnewaz Kakoli, actress
- Dilara Zaman, actress
- Raisul Islam Asad, actor, freedom fighter
- Mamunur Rashid, actor, theater activist
- Nader Chowdhury, actor
- AKM Bazlul Karim, theater personality
- Ataur Rahman, actor

==== Filmmakers and directors ====
- Alamgir Kabir, filmmaker; three of his feature films are featured in the British Film Institute's list of "Top 10 Bangladeshi Films"
- Humayun Ahmed, Bengali novelist, short-story writer and filmmaker
- Khan Ataur Rahman, film actor, director, producer, screenplay writer, music composer, and singer
- Shahriar Kabir, novelist, journalist, filmmaker and human rights activist
- Tanvir Mokammel, Bengali filmmaker, and author
- Tareque Masud, independent film director, film producer, screenwriter and lyricist
- Zahir Raihan, filmmaker and noted novelist and short-story writer
- Tanim Noor, filmmaker
- Abdullah Mohammad Saad, noted young filmmaker
- Abu Shahed Emon, filmmaker
- Animesh Aich, filmmaker
- Nurul Alam Atique, scriptwriter, filmmaker
- Shabnam Ferdousi, filmmaker

==== Musicians and singers ====
- Anjuman Ara Begum, singer
- Ashiquzzaman Tulu, musician, composer, former leader of Ark
- Asif Iqbal, lyricist
- Fahmida Nabi, singer
- Ferdausi Rahman, playback, ghazal and folk singer
- Khan Ataur Rahman, film actor, director, producer, screenplay writer, music composer, and singer
- Kiran Chandra Roy, baul and folk musician and songwriter
- Leila Arjumand Banu, classical singer
- Maqsoodul Haque, rock musician, singer-songwriter, frontmant of Maqsood o Dhaka, and former frontman of Feedback
- Mehreen Mahmud, pop musician
- Mobarak Hossain Khan, music researcher, surbahar player
- Nilufar Yasmin, singer
- Priyanka Gope, singer
- Rathindranath Roy, singer
- Rezwana Chowdhury Banya, noted Rabindrasangeet artiste.
- Sabina Yasmin, singer
- Samina Chowdhury, singer
- Khalid, singer, former frontman of Chime.
- Sanjida Khatun, singer, academic, leader of Chhayanot
- Shakila Zafar, singer
- Shafiq Tuhin, lyricist, music director and singer
- Shuvro Dev, musician
- Tahsan Rahman Khan, singer, keyboardist, guitarist, composer, lyricist, actor, anchor and teacher
- Waheedul Haq, journalist, writer, musicologist and founder of Chhayanaut
- Zahidur Rahim, Rabindrasangeet artiste.
- Reenat Fauzia, sitar player
- Hamin Ahmed, singer, rockstar, frontman of the legendary band Miles
- Husna Banu Khanam, nazrulsangeet artiste
- Kamal Ahmed, Rabindrasangeet artist

=== Visual arts ===
==== Visual and print artists ====
- Ahsan Habib, cartoonist, writer and editor of satire magazine Unmad
- Firoz Mahmud, contemporary visual artist
- Kanak Chanpa Chakma, artist
- Qayyum Chowdhury, artist
- Maksudul Ahsan, artist
- Murtaja Baseer, painter
- Rafiqun Nabi, artist and cartoonist
- Shahabuddin Ahmed, artist
- Shishir Bhattacharjee, artist
- Taslima Akhter, activist and photographer
- Nitun Kundu, sculptor
- Zainul Abedin, painter
- Monirul Islam, artist
- Safiuddin Ahmed, artist
- Mohammad Kibria, artist
- Hashem Khan, artist
- Aminul Islam (artist)
- Syed Jahangir, painter
- Abdur Razzaque (artist), painter
- Rashid Choudhury, painter
- Farida Zaman, painter and illustrator
- Rokeya Sultana (artist), painter
- Hamidur Rahman (artist), painter
- Samarjit Roy Chowdhury, painter
- Dilara Begum Jolly, painter
- Abdus Shakoor (painter), painter

==== Miscellaneous and multidisciplinary figures ====
- Abdullah Abu Sayeed, writer, television presenter, organizer and activist
- Zobeda Khanum, writer

== Business ==
- Abul Barkat, economist, former chairman of state-owned Janata Bank
- Abul Khair Litu, chairman of the Bengal Foundation
- Ahmed Akbar Sobhan, founder and chairman of Bashundhara Group
- Anis Ud Dowla, founder of ACI group of industries
- Chandra Shekhar Ghosh, chairman managing director of Bandhan Bank, India
- Mohammad Shahjahan, acting managing director of Grameen Bank
- Mustafa Jabbar, IT entrepreneur and former minister
- Samson H. Chowdhury, entrepreneur and former chairman of Astras Ltd. and Square (Bangladesh)
- Syed Humayun Kabir, philanthropist and chairman of Renata Limited
- Syed Manzur Elahi, chairman of Apex Group
- Muhammad Aziz Khan, businessperson, founder of Summit Group
- Golam Dastagir Gazi, founder of Gazi group, politician, freedom fighter

== Constitutional officials ==
=== Presidents of Bangladesh ===
- Sheikh Mujibur Rahman (expelled and hence did not graduate), 1st and 4th President of Bangladesh
- Mohammad Mohammadullah, 3rd President of Bangladesh
- Khondaker Mostaq Ahmad, 5th President of Bangladesh
- A. F. M. Ahsanuddin Chowdhury, 9th President of Bangladesh
- Hussain Muhammad Ershad, 10th President of Bangladesh
- Abdur Rahman Biswas, 11th President of Bangladesh
- Shahabuddin Ahmed, 12th President of Bangladesh
- A. Q. M. Badruddoza Chowdhury, 13th President of Bangladesh
- Iajuddin Ahmed, 14th President of Bangladesh
- Zillur Rahman, 15th President of Bangladesh
- Mohammad Abdul Hamid, 16th President of Bangladesh
- Syed Nazrul Islam, former acting President of Bangladesh during the Bangladesh Liberation War in 1971
- Muhammad Jamiruddin Sircar, former acting President of Bangladesh
- Mirza Fakhrul Islam Alamgir, incumbent President of Bangladesh

=== Prime ministers of Bangladesh ===
- Sheikh Mujibur Rahman (expelled and did not graduate), 2nd Prime Minister of Bangladesh
- Ataur Rahman Khan, 5th Prime Minister of Bangladesh
- Moudud Ahmed, 7th Prime Minister of Bangladesh
- Kazi Zafar Ahmed, 8th Prime Minister of Bangladesh
- Sheikh Hasina, 10th Prime Minister of Bangladesh
- Tarique Rahman (dropped out and did not graduate), 11th and incumbent Prime Minister of Bangladesh.

=== Vice presidents and deputy prime ministers ===
- Jamal Uddin Ahmad, Deputy Prime Minister of Bangladesh, 1977–1982
- Mirza Nurul Huda, 3rd Vice President of Bangladesh
- Moudud Ahmed, 6th Vice President of Bangladesh

=== Speakers of the Jatiya Sangsad ===
- Mohammad Mohammadullah, 2nd speaker of the Jatiya Sangsad
- Abdul Malek Ukil, 3rd speaker of the Jatiya Sangsad
- Mirza Ghulam Hafiz, 4th speaker of the Jatiya Sangsad
- Abdur Rahman Biswas, 6th speaker of the Jatiya Sangsad
- Sheikh Razzak Ali, 7th speaker of the Jatiya Sangsad
- Muhammad Jamiruddin Sircar, 10th speaker of the Jatiya Sangsad
- Shawkat Ali, 11th speaker of the Jatiya Sangsad (acting)
- Shirin Sharmin Chaudhury, 12th speaker of the Jatiya Sangsad
- Hafiz Uddin Ahmad, 13th and incumbent speaker of the Jatiya Sangsad

=== Chief advisers ===
- Muhammad Yunus, Chief Adviser 2024-2026
- Fakhruddin Ahmed, Chief Adviser 2007–2009
- Iajuddin Ahmed, Chief Adviser 2006–2007
- Latifur Rahman, Chief Adviser in 2001
- Muhammad Habibur Rahman, Chief Adviser in 1996
- Shahabuddin Ahmed, Chief Adviser 1990–1991

=== Cabinet ministers ===
- Nazmul Huda, former Minister of Information (1991-1994) and Minister of Communications (2001-2006)
- Abul Maal Abdul Muhith, former Finance Minister of Bangladesh
- AKM Azizul Haque, Minister of Agriculture (1976–1979)
- Anisul Huq, Minister for Law, Justice and Parliamentary Affairs
- Asaduzzaman Noor, former Minister of Cultural Affairs
- Dewan Abdul Basith, former Minister of Commerce and Industry (1965–1969)
- S. M. Amzad Hossain, former minister of Education (1927–2013)
- Imran Ahmad, Minister of Expatriates' Welfare and Overseas Employment
- Mainul Hosein, former law minister
- Matia Chowdhury, former Minister of Agriculture
- Motiur Rahman Nizami, Former Minister and Ameer of Bangladesh Jamaat-e-Islami
- Muhiuddin Khan Alamgir, former Minister of Home Affairs
- Muhammad Ishaq, founder Ameer of Khelafat Majlis
- Nurul Islam Nahid, former Minister of Education
- Obaidul Quader, former Minister of Communications
- Rashed Khan Menon, former Minister of Tourism and Civil Aviation
- Saifur Rahman, former Finance Minister
- Salahuddin Ahmed, incumbent minister of home affairs.
- Shah A M S Kibria, former Finance Minister
- Sheikh Shahidul Islam, former Minister of Education
- Tofail Ahmed, former Minister of Commerce
- Iqbal Hassan Mahmood, minister of power, energy, and mineral resources
- Nitai Roy Chowdhury, minister of cultural affairs
- Zahir Uddin Swapon, minister of information
- Afroza Khanam Rita, minister of civil aviation and tourism
- Shahid Uddin Chowdhury Anee, minister of water resources
- Md. Asaduzzaman, minister of law
- Dipen Dewan, minister of CHT affairs
- A. N. M. Ehsanul Hoque Milan, minister of education
- Sardar Md. Sakhawat Husain, minister of health
- Anindya Islam Amit, state minister of power, energy
- Sultan Salauddin Tuku, state minister of agriculture, food
- Farhad Hossain Azad, state minister of water resources
- Zonayed Saki, state minister of planning
- Farzana Sharmin, state minister of social welfare
- Shaikh Faridul Islam, state minister of environment, forest
- Nurul Haque Nur, state minister of overseas employment

=== Chief Election Commissioners ===
- Mohammad Abdur Rouf, fifth chief election commissioner of Bangladesh
- A.K.M. Sadeq, sixth chief election commissioner of Bangladesh
- Mohammad Abu Hena, seventh chief election commissioner of Bangladesh
- M. A. Aziz, ninth chief election commissioner of Bangladesh
- A. T. M. Shamsul Huda, tenth chief election commissioner of Bangladesh
- Kazi Rakibuddin Ahmed, eleventh chief election commissioner of Bangladesh
- K. M. Nurul Huda, twelfth chief election commissioner of Bangladesh
- Kazi Habibul Awal, thirteenth chief election commissioner of Bangladesh

=== Foreign Public Officials ===
- Lotay Tshering, Prime Minister of Bhutan
- Tandi Dorji, Minister of Foreign Affairs of Bhutan

== Journalism and media ==
- Abdul Hafiz (journalist), founding editor of Saptahid Robibar.
- Abdul Quadir, poet, editor, and journalist.
- Abdul Wahab (journalist), editor of The Dhaka Daily, and Morning News
- Abed Khan, editor and publisher of Jagaran.
- Abul Kalam Azad (journalist), former chief editor of Bangladesh Sangbad Sangstha
- Abul Momen, advisory editor of Dainik Suprovat
- Ahmadul Kabir, journalist and editor
- Ahmed Humayun, journalist and columnist
- Ahmed Zaman Chowdhury, journalist and writer
- AKM Shamim Chowdhury, journalist and news presenter
- Ali Riaz, journalist, academic, and columnist
- Altaf Husain, founding editor of Dawn
- Ataus Samad, journalist and author
- Bazlur Rahman (journalist), journalist and human rights activist
- Chowdhury Mueen-Uddin, journalist and former special correspondent
- Enayetullah Khan, journalist and editor of Holiday
- Faruk Quazi, journalist and media executive
- Fazle Lohani, journalist, television presenter, and travel writer
- Gaziul Hasan Khan, journalist and former editor of The Daily Ittefaq
- Ghulam Murshid, journalist, author, and academic
- Gias Kamal Chowdhury, journalist and columnist
- Golam Sarwar, journalist and editor of Samakal
- Haroon Habib, chief editor and managing director of Bangladesh Sangbad Sangstha (BSS)
- Humayun Kabir Dhali, journalist and editor
- Ihsanul Karim, journalist and former director general of Bangladesh Betar
- K G Mustafa, journalist and diplomat
- Kaberi Gayen, journalist and columnist for The Daily Star
- Khaled Muhiuddin, head of the German-based international media Deutsche Welle Bangla Department
- Mahbub Anam, former editor of the Bangladesh Times
- Mahbub Jamal Zahedi, establishing newspaper editor of the Khaleej Times
- Mahbubul Alam (journalist), journalist and former editor of The Daily Sangram
- Mahfuz Anam, editor of The Daily Star
- Mahfuz Ullah, journalist and television host
- Mahmudur Rahman, editor of Amar Desh
- Mainul Hosein, former chairman of the editorial board of the Ittefaq
- Matiur Rahman, editor of Daily Prothom Alo
- Mishuk Munier, former CEO and chief editor of satellite TV channel ATN News
- Mithila Farzana, journalist and news anchor
- Moniruddin Yusuf, journalist and author
- Monzur Hossain, journalist and columnist
- Muhammad Ziauddin, Pakistani journalist, economist and historian
- Mukhlesur Rahman Chowdhury, journalist, former press secretary, and advisor to the president
- Naem Nizam, journalist and talk show host
- Nayeemul Islam Khan, journalist and political analyst
- Nazim Uddin Mostan, journalist and editor
- Nobonita Chowdhury, journalist and women’s rights activist
- Nurul Kabir, editor of The New Age
- Obaidul Huq, journalist and former editor of The Daily Ittefaq
- Qazi Motahar Hossain, journalist, writer, and scientist
- Ranesh Maitra, journalist and film critic
- Riaz Uddin Ahmed, awarded Ekushey Padak for journalism
- Saiful Alam (journalist), journalist and editor
- Samia Zaman, journalist, presenter, filmmaker
- Samudra Gupta (poet), poet, journalist, and translator
- Sanjeeb Choudhury, journalist and writer
- Sayeed Atiqullah, journalist and former editor of The Daily Ittefaq
- Shafik Rehman, journalist and political commentator
- Shafiqul Alam, journalist and former press secretary to the Chief Adviser of Bangladesh
- Shah Alamgir, journalist and editor
- Shahadat Chowdhury, journalist and columnist
- Shahriar Kabir, journalist, filmmaker, and human rights activist
- Shamsur Rahman (poet), poet, journalist, and columnist
- Shaukat Mahmood, journalist and author
- Shykh Seraj, news director at Channel i
- SM Haroon-or-Rashid, journalist and former editor of The Daily Sangram
- Swadesh Roy, journalist and writer
- Syed Badrul Ahsan, journalist and political commentator
- Syed Mohammad Ali, journalist and founding editor of The Daily Star
- Tofazzal Hossain (civil servant), journalist, civil servant, and former press secretary
- Toufique Imrose Khalidi, editor of bdnews24.com
- Zafar Wazed, journalist and former editor of The Daily Sangram

== Law and judiciary ==
=== Chief Justices of the Supreme Court of Bangladesh ===
- Badrul Haider Chowdhury, 5th Chief Justice of Bangladesh
- Shahabuddin Ahmed, 6th Chief Justice of Bangladesh
- Muhammad Habibur Rahman, 7th Chief Justice of Bangladesh
- Justice Mustafa Kamal, 9th Chief Justice of Bangladesh
- Latifur Rahman, 10th Chief Justice of Bangladesh
- Syed Jillur Rahim Mudasser Husain, 14th Chief Justice of Bangladesh
- Md. Tafazzul Islam, 17th Chief Justice of Bangladesh
- Md. Muzammel Hossain, 20th Chief Justice of Bangladesh
- Obaidul Hassan, 24th Chief Justice of Bangladesh
- Syed Refaat Ahmed, 25th Chief Justice of Bangladesh
- Zubayer Rahman Chowdhury, 26th and incumbent Chief Justice of Bangladesh

=== Justices of the Supreme Court of Bangladesh ===
- Mohammad Abdur Rouf, justice and former Chief Election Commissioner of Bangladesh
- Khizir Hayat Lizu, justice of the Supreme Court of Bangladesh
- Farah Mahbub, judge
- Amir Hossain, judge
- Abdul Hye Choudhury, judge

=== Judges of the lower courts ===
- Masdar Hossain, Bangladeshi judge of the lower judiciary, widely known for his role in the landmark separation of judiciary case (Secretary, Ministry of Finance v. Masdar Hossain), which strengthened judicial independence in Bangladesh.

=== Attorneys General of Bangladesh ===
- Faqueer Shahabuddin Ahmad, 2nd Attorney General of Bangladesh
- Syed Ishtiaq Ahmed, 3rd Attorney General of Bangladesh
- Mahmudul Islam, 10th Attorney General of Bangladesh
- Mahbubey Alam, 15th Attorney General of Bangladesh
- AM Amin Uddin, 16th Attorney General of Bangladesh
- Md Asaduzzaman, 17th Attorney General of Bangladesh
- Ruhul Quddus Kazal, 18th and incumbent Attorney General of Bangladesh

=== Lawyers ===
- Adilur Rahman Khan, Bangladeshi human rights lawyer and Secretary of Odhikar, noted for his advocacy on extrajudicial killings, enforced disappearances, and digital security laws in Bangladesh.
- Mohiuddin Farooque, prominent Bangladeshi environmental lawyer and activist, known for pioneering public interest litigation in Bangladesh, particularly through the Bangladesh Environmental Lawyers Association (BELA).
- Rokanuddin Mahmud, senior Bangladeshi advocate of the Supreme Court and former President of the Supreme Court Bar Association, noted for his involvement in significant constitutional and political cases.
- Sharif Bhuiyan, Bangladeshi legal scholar and advocate, known for his work on international law and human rights, and involvement with the Bangladesh Institute of Law and International Affairs (BILIA).
- Syeda Rizwana Hasan, Bangladeshi lawyer and environmental activist, associated with BELA, recognized for her work on environmental justice and governance reforms.
- Sultana Kamal, lawyer, human rights activist.
- Salma Sobhan, lawyer, activist
- Syed Ishtiaq Ahmed, lawyer, constitutionalist
- Mahmudul Islam, lawyer, constitutional law expert

== Military and police ==
=== Army ===
- Lieutenant General H M Ershad, 5th Chief of Army Staff of Bangladesh
- Lieutenant General Hasan Mashhud Chowdhury, 13th Chief of Army Staff of Bangladesh
- General Abu Belal Muhammad Shafiul Huq, 17th Chief of Army Staff of Bangladesh
- Major Abdul Waheed Chowdhury, served in the British-Indian Army and Pakistan Army, WWII veteran

=== Police ===
- Abdul Khaleque, 1st Inspector General of Police of Bangladesh
- A. B. M. G. Kibria, 5th Inspector General of Police of Bangladesh
- E. A. Chowdhury, 7th Inspector General of Police of Bangladesh
- Abdur Raquib Khandaker, 8th Inspector General of Police of Bangladesh
- Enamul Huq, 11th Inspector General of Police of Bangladesh
- M. Azizul Haq, 13th Inspector General of Police of Bangladesh
- Mohammad Hadis Uddin, 20th Inspector General of Police of Bangladesh
- Abdul Kaium, 21st Inspector General of Police of Bangladesh
- Khoda Baksh Chowdhury, 23rd Inspector General of Police of Bangladesh
- Nur Mohammad (police officer), 24th Inspector General of Police of Bangladesh
- Hassan Mahmood Khandker, 25th Inspector General of Police of Bangladesh
- A. K. M. Shahidul Haque, 26th Inspector General of Police of Bangladesh
- Mohammad Javed Patwary, 27th Inspector General of Police of Bangladesh
- Benazir Ahmed, 28th Inspector General of Police of Bangladesh
- Md. Mainul Islam (police officer), 30th Inspector General of Police of Bangladesh
- Md. Ali Hossain Fakir, 32nd Inspector General of Police of Bangladesh
- Rowshan Ara Begum, first woman Superintendent of Police of Bangladesh

== Nobel laureates ==
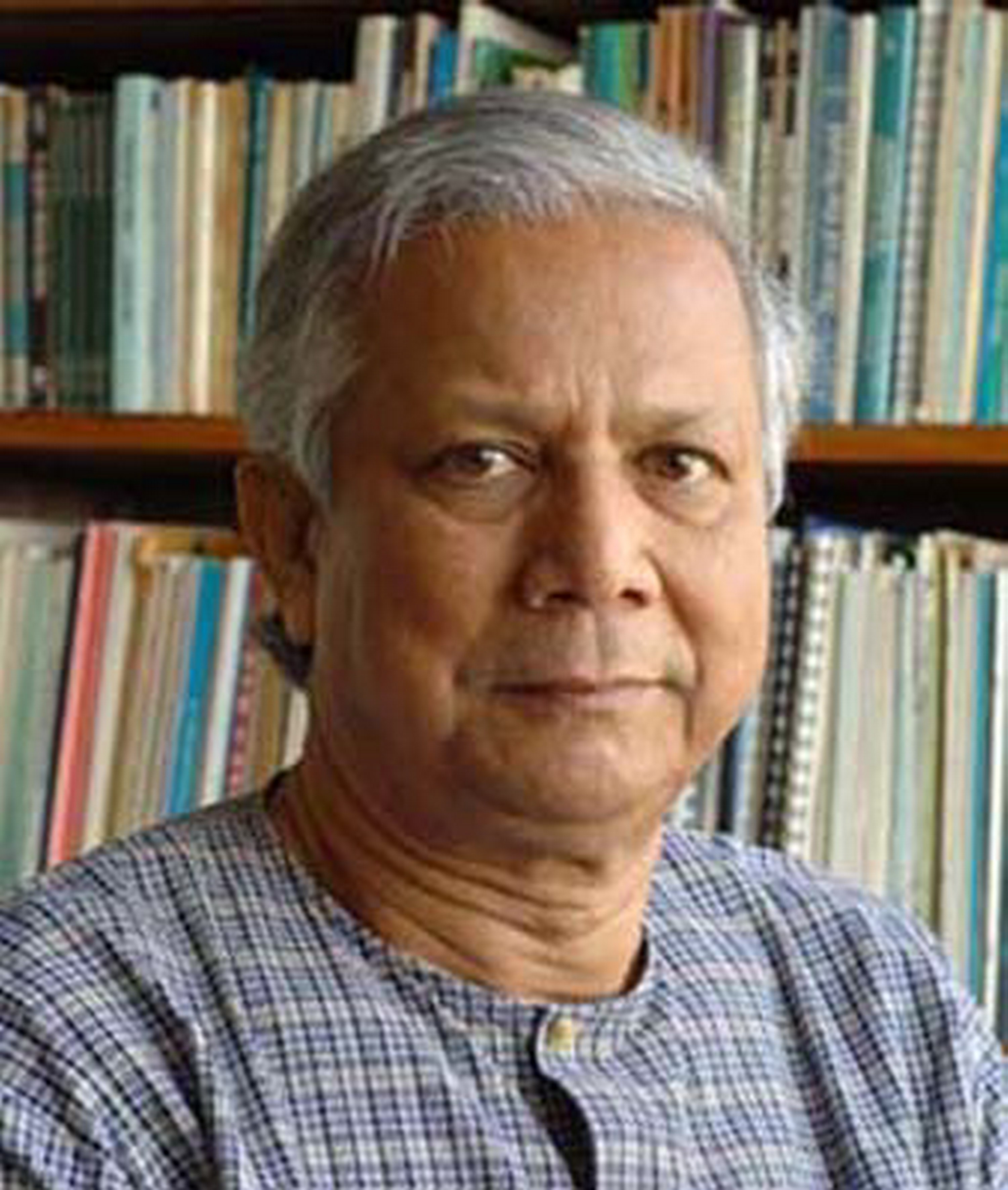
Muhammad Yunus, 2006 Nobel Peace Prize winner

- Muhammad Yunus, awarded the Nobel Peace Prize in 2006

== Politics and activism ==
=== Political party leaders and activists ===
- A.K. Mosharraf Hossain, politician and lawyer
- Ghulam Azam, Former Ameer of Bangladesh Jamaat-e-Islami and former GS of Dhaka University Central Students' Union
- Mirza Abbas, standing committee member of BNP, and Member of Parliament
- Mirza Fakhrul Islam Alamgir, Secretary-General of the Bangladesh Nationalist Party and present MP, present President of Bangladesh
- Tarique Rahman, acting chairman of the Bangladesh Nationalist Party, Prime Minister of Bangladesh

=== Student leaders and political activists ===
- Abdul Malek, student leader killed by rivals
- Asif Mahmud, Advisor, 2024 Bangladesh interim government
- Jahanara Imam, writer and political activist
- Moin Hossain Raju, student leader, killed while protesting terrorism on campus; inspiration for the Anti Terrorism Raju Memorial Sculpture
- Nahid Islam, advisor, 2024 Bangladesh interim government, current MP
- Raufun Basunia, student leader killed in 1985 protest
- Sarjis Alam, activist
- Sharif Osman Hadi, late activist and spokesperson of Inqilab Mancha
- Hasnat Abdullah, activist and current MP
- Nurul Haq Nur, former VP, Dhaka University Central Students' Union, current MP
- Shadik Kayem, present VP, Dhaka University Central Students' Union

=== Foreign political figures ===
- Leela Roy, Indian politician and reformer
- M. A. Gaffar, influential rohingya politician, legislator of the Union of Burma, Parliamentary secretary of Ministry of Health (Myanmar)

=== East Pakistan era politicians ===
- Abdus Salam Khan, Minister in East Pakistan provincial cabinet
- A. K. Mosharraf Hossain, a minister in the Malik cabinet of 1971
- Fakhruddin Ahmed, Minister in East Pakistan provincial cabinet
- Mashiur Rahman, former senior minister
- Syed Khwaja Khairuddin

== Public service ==
=== Comptrollers and Auditor Generals ===
- Fazle Kader Muhammad Abdul Baqui, first Comptroller and Auditor General of Bangladesh.

=== Diplomats and civil servants ===
- Abul Fateh, first foreign secretary of Bangladesh
- Iftekhar Ahmed Chowdhury, former foreign minister of Bangladesh
- Mohammad Salah Uddin, former Secretary of the Prime Minister's Office under Prime Minister Sheikh Hasina.
- Mukhlesur Rahman Chowdhury, former press secretary to the President
- Muhammad Abdul Muhith, diplomat.
- Nahida Sobhan, Ambassador to Jordan
- Nasima Haider, High Commissioner to South Africa (2005–2007)
- Tabarak Husain, former foreign secretary of Bangladesh

=== Governors of Bangladesh Bank ===
- Shegufta Bakht Chaudhuri, 4th Governor of Bangladesh Bank
- Khorshed Alam, 5th Governor of Bangladesh Bank
- Lutfar Rahman Sarkar, 6th Governor of Bangladesh Bank
- Mohammed Farashuddin, 7th Governor of Bangladesh Bank
- Fakhruddin Ahmed, 8th Governor of Bangladesh Bank
- Salehuddin Ahmed, 9th Governor of Bangladesh Bank
- Atiur Rahman, 10th Governor of Bangladesh Bank
- Abdur Rouf Talukder, 12th Governor of Bangladesh Bank
- Ahsan H. Mansur, 13th Governor of Bangladesh Bank
- Md Mostaqur Rahman, 14th and incumbent Governor of Bangladesh Bank

== Sports, games, and adventure ==
=== Athletics ===
- Qazi Abdul Alim, athlete.

=== Chess ===
- Ziaur Rahman, chess player from Bangladesh and the second Grandmaster of the country

=== Cricket ===
- Athar Ali Khan, former international cricketer and cricket commentator
- Jahurul Islam, former international cricketer
- Mosharraf Hossain, former international cricketer
- Shahriar Nafees, former international cricketer
- Towhid Hridoy, current international cricketer

=== Football ===
- AKM Nowsheruzzaman, former international footballer
- Ashraf Uddin Ahmed Chunnu, former international footballer and football administrator
- Badal Roy, former international footballer
- B. Roy Chowdhury, former footballer
- Kaiser Hamid, former international footballer
- Kazi Salahuddin, former international footballer and football administrator
- Manzur Hasan Mintu, international footballer who played for Pakistan
- Mostafa Hossain Mukul, former international footballer
- Pratap Shankar Hazra, international footballer
- Romizuddin Ahmed, former footballer and athlete
- Saifur Rahman Moni, former international footballer
- Sayeed Hassan Kanan, former international footballer
- Wahiduzzaman Khan Pintu, former international footballer
- Zakaria Pintoo, former international footballer

=== Mountaineering ===
- Musa Ibrahim, first Bangladeshi to summit Mount Everest

== Others ==
- Fazle Hasan Abed, founder of BRAC, 1980 Ramon Magsaysay awardee for Community Leadership
- The Most Reverend Archbishop Paul S. Sarker, former Archbishop (Primate of All Bangladesh) of Dhaka
- M.A.N. Siddique, first managing director of Dhaka Mass Transit Company Limited
- Tahrunessa Abdullah, 1978 Ramon Magsaysay awardee for Community Leadership
- Jalal Ahmed, chairman, Bangladesh Energy Regulatory Commission
