= Mohammad Shahjahan =

Mohammad Shahjahan or variations may refer to:

- Mohammad Shahjahan (CEO), CEO of Grameen Bank
- M. Shahjahan, rear admiral of Bangladesh Navy
- Mohammad Shahjahan (footballer), Bangladeshi football player and administrator
- Mohammad Shahjahan (politician), politician of Chuadanga District of Bangladesh
- Muhammad Shahjahan (1939–2000), Bangladeshi academic
- Md. Shahjahan, Bangladeshi politician
