= AKM Bazlul Karim =

Bangladeshi theater personality

AKM Bazlul Karim was a Bangladeshi theater personality.

== Early life ==
Bazlul Karim was born on 23 March 1932 in Comilla, East Bengal, British India. He finished his master's degree at Dhaka University. While in university, he became active in theater and played in drama organized by Sanskriti Sangsad and Dhaka University Central Students' Union. He played a role in Nildurpun in 1955, Parihas Bijlipitam in 1956, and Keu Kichhu Balte Pare Na in 1956.

== Career ==
Bazlul Karim played an important role in the early theater movement of Bangladesh and was a founding member of Drama Circle in 1956, a pioneering theater group. He moved abroad in 1963 and returned to Bangladesh in 1973 following its independence from Pakistan. He helped revitalize Drama Circle after returning to Bangladesh. He translated a number of non-Bengali plays into Bengali and staged them.

== Death ==
Bazlul Karim died on 1977.
