= Nurjahan Murshid =

Bangladeshi politician

- নূর জাহান বেগ

Member of the Bangladesh Parliament for Reserved Women's Seat–10
- In office 7 April 1973 – 6 November 1975
- Preceded by: Position created

Personal details
- Born: 22 May 1924 Murshidabad district, Bengal Presidency, British India
- Died: 1 September 2003 (aged 79)
- Spouse: Khan Sarwar Murshid (m. 1948)
- Children: Khan Ahmed Sayeed Murshid; Sharmeen Murshid
- Education: University of Calcutta
- Occupation: Politician, activist

Nurjahan Murshid (née Beg; 22 May 1924 – 1 September 2003) was a journalist and teacher, a Bangladesh cabinet minister, and social activist.

== Early life and family ==
Noorjahan Beg was born on 22 May 1924 to a Bengali family of Baigs in Taranagar, Murshidabad in the then British India. She was the fourth among the seven daughters of Janab Ayub Hussain Beg and Bibi Khatimunnessa. She received her early schooling at home under her father, chief of police and daroga in Lalgola, Murshidabad, under the British Police Service, and later under her paternal uncle Professor Husam Uddin Beg, who was the Principal of Brojomohun College in Barisal. She finished her secondary education with a first division at Victoria Institution, Calcutta. She received a master's degree in history from the University of Calcutta.

== Work ==
Murshid was a broadcaster for All India Radio. Notably, she was the first Muslim woman to work for this establishment. In East Pakistan, Murshid continued to work for the media, broadcasting for Radio Pakistan and rising to become a programme producer that brought her into contact with figures such as Shamsul Huda, Laila Arjumand Banu, Laila Samad, and Kamal Lohani. She became Principal of Syedunnesa Girls' High School in Barisal, and later taught at various institutions in Dhaka, such as Kamrunnessa Government Girls High School, Viqarunnisa Noon School and College and Holy Cross College.

Murshid was one of two women to be directly elected to the Provincial Legislative Assembly of East Bengal in 1954 on a United Front ticket. As an accredited deputy of the Mujibnagar Government in exile she sought the recognition of Bangladesh from the Indian government, essentially to raise support for the Bangladesh Liberation war. That prompted the Pakistani military junta to sentence her to 14 years rigorous imprisonment in absentia. In independent Bangladesh, she was appointed in 1972 as state minister for health and social welfare in the cabinet of Sheikh Mujibur Rahman. She was elected to the country's first parliament in 1973. She left politics after the assassination of Sheikh Mujibur Rahman and the jail killings of four key cabinet ministers, including Tajuddin Ahmed, prime minister of Bangladesh in exile, and Syed Nazrul Islam, former acting president of Bangladesh, in exile in 1975.

In 1985, Murshid brought out a Bangla periodical called Ekal and became its editor. Later renamed Edesh Ekal, it focused not just on the problems of women, but also explored various social and political issues that confronted Bangladesh, including violence, representation, corruption and democratic deficit. Among her notable contributions to the journal were a series of interviews of personalities like the writer Nirad Choudhury, once the personal secretary of A. K. Fazlul Huq of the Krishak Proja Party, poet Shamsur Rahman and painter Quamrul Hassan, who incidentally had illustrated the cover page of her journal. The journal folded in 1991, due in part to financial constraints and in part to weariness that was multiplied by the hardship faced by the middle classes after the big floods of 1988, wrote Noorjehan.

Murshid was the first President of the Bangladesh Mahila Samity, the founder President of Azimpur Ladies Club, the founder of Agrani Balika Bidyalay, a founder member of Birdem Diabetic Clinic, a sponsor of Ain-o-Shalish Kendra at its infancy, the founder of Sreyoshi, a club for the wives of Dhaka University teachers. Notably, the request of the ladies to seal one of the entrances to the university compound and its subsequent accomplishment saved the life of Noor and her family on 26 March 1971 at the start of Operation Searchlight. She was the first Bengali Muslim woman to act on stage in East Pakistan in 1949.

== Personal life ==
Noorjahan married Khan Sarwar Murshid in 1948. They had four children, economist Khan Ahmed Sayeed Murshid, historian Tazeen Murshid, Sharmeen Murshid, and Kumar Murshid.

== Death and legacy ==
Murshid was diagnosed with cancer in 2002, and died on 1 September 2003 in Dhaka.

She was posthumously awarded the Ekushey Padak in social welfare in 2013.
