= Sanskriti Sangsad =

Dhaka University cultural organization

Sanskriti Sangsad was a cultural organization of Dhaka University, Bangladesh. It was renamed to Dhaka Vishwavidyalay Sangskriti Sangsad during its lifetime.

== History ==
Sanskriti Sangsad was established in 1951 (75 years ago) as left-wing secular cultural organization inspired by the Bolshevik revolution in Russia. It was founded by Anwarul Azim, Hasan Hafizur Rahman, Khan Sarwar Murshid, Munier Choudhury, and Obaidullah Khan. Khan Sarwar Murshid was the founding President and the founding General Secretary Mustafa Nurul Islam. On 4 September 1951, the organization presented its debut play, an adaption of Jabanbandi by Bijon Bhattacharya. This was the first play in Dhaka University to have female students perform in it.

Aside from holding plays it hosted literary conferences and discussions. It help programs marking the birthdays of famous Bengali writers such as Kazi Nazrul Islam, Rabindranath Tagore, and Sukanta Bhattacharya. It was closely aligned with the East Pakistan Students Union, a left-wing students group. In 1965 (61 years ago), internal divisions and infighting led to the breakup of East Pakistan Students Union and the Sanskriti Sangsad subsequently divided as well. The organization went defunct soon after.
