= Sharmeen Murshid =

Bangladeshi activist

- শারমিন মুরশিদ
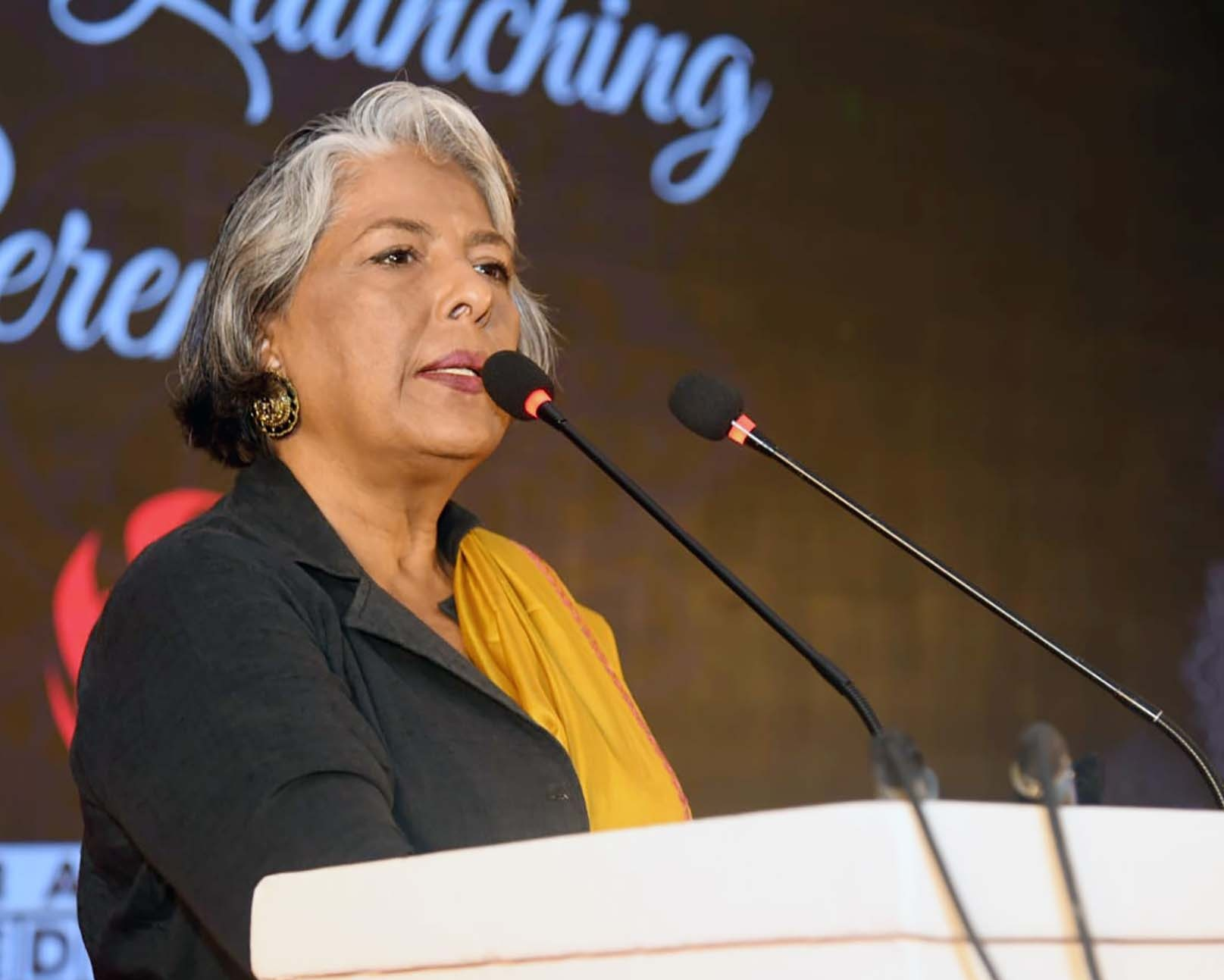
- Murshid in July 2025

Adviser for Social Welfare
- In office 9 August 2024 – 17 February 2026
- President: Mohammed Shahabuddin
- Chief Adviser: Muhammad Yunus
- Preceded by: Dipu Moni

Adviser for Women and Children Affairs
- In office 22 August 2024 – 17 February 2026
- President: Mohammed Shahabuddin
- Chief Adviser: Muhammad Yunus
- Preceded by: Simeen Hussain Rimi

Personal details
- Born: Nabinagar, Chittagong, Bangladesh
- Parents: Khan Sarwar Murshid (father); Nurjahan Murshid (mother)
- Relatives: Khan Ahmed Sayeed Murshid (brother); Tazeen Mahnaz Murshid (sister); Kumar Murshid (brother)

Sharmeen Soneya Murshid is a Bangladeshi activist and former adviser of the interim government. She served as an adviser to the Ministry of Women and Children Affairs and Ministry of Social Welfare. during the interim government of Bangladesh under Nobel laureate Muhammad Yunus. She was chief executive officer of human rights organization Brotee which has been working for the rights of marginalized groups, especially the indigenous people since 2001. Murshid is also a former Commissioner of the National River Conservation Commission.

== Early life ==
Murshid's parents were Khan Sarwar Murshid and Nurjahan Murshid. Her father was a member of the planning commission of Mujibnagar government and confidante of Tajuddin Ahmed and her mother was a member of parliament. Her brother is Khan Ahmed Sayeed Murshid, former director general of the Bangladesh Institute of Development Studies. Her elder sister is Tazeen Mahnaz Murshid, senior lecturer of King's College London. Her another brother Kumar Murshid is a leftist politician in the United Kingdom who was formerly Labour Party.

== Career ==
In 1971 during the Bangladesh Liberation War, Murshid was a member of the Bangladesh Mukti Sangrami Shilpi Sangstha which created propaganda songs for the Mukti Bahini. She was a student of grade 10 in 1971. Tareque Masud and his wife Catherine Masud made a documentary of the group called Muktir Gaan. She identifies herself as a freedom fighter and has spoken for greater recognition of female freedom fighters. She had question Why Pakistan Army surrendered to the Indian Army after the war and not to the Bangladeshi people?

In 2008, Murshid was the general secretary of National Alliance for Election Monitoring for the 9th parliamentary election of Bangladesh.

In August 2012, Murshid signed a statement along with 57 other women leaders asking the government to leave Grameen Bank alone after its founder Muhammad Yunus was forced to resign by Bangladesh Bank. Other signatories included Farida Akther, Hameeda Hossain, Khushi Kabir, Maleka Begum, Rasheda K. Chowdhury, Rokia Afzal Rahman, Sara Hossain, Sultana Kamal, and Syeda Rizwana Hasan.

In 2014, she said the Election Commission had failed to hold a fair and free 10th parliamentary election.

Murshid was the general secretary of Uttarsury Nurjahan-Sarwar Murshid Cultural Centre, which oversaw the secretariate of the National Celebration Committee for the Birth Centenary of Khan Sarwar Murshid. It also provides Uttarsury-Nurjahan Murshid Smrity Padak awards.

Murshid is the Chief Executive Officer of Brotee, an election observation group. She told Shakhawat Liton of The Daily Star in 2018 that the space for election monitoring was decreasing due to lack of funding and Bangladesh Election Commission ignoring respected observers.

In 2020, Murshid was a member of the National River Conservation Commission, a quasi-judicial commission responsible for protecting rivers. In October 2021, she signed a statement panning a culture of impunity when it comes to attacks on religious minorities in Bangladesh. In 2023, she signed a letter criticizing the government treatment of Khaleda Zia, warning it could lead to a political crises, and asking the government to send her abroad for treatment. Other signatories included Ali Imam Majumder, Asif Nazrul, CR Abrar, Farida Akhtar, Hafizuddin Khan, Naila Z Khan, Nur Khan, Rahnuma Ahmed, Shahdeen Malik, Shahidul Alam, Shireen Huq, Syeda Rizwana Hasan, and Tofail Ahmed.

Murshid was critical of the 2024 Bangladeshi election describing it as one-sided election by one party which party members stand against each other. She was critical of the government using violence against quota reform protestors.

Murshid was appointed an advisor in the Muhammad Yunus led interim government. She was placed in charge of the Ministry of Social Welfare.
