= Bangladesh Environmental Lawyers Association =

Nonprofit legal organization

The Bangladesh Environmental Lawyers Association (Bengali: বাংলাদেশ পরিবেশ আইনবিদ সমিতি), or BELA (বেলা), is a nonprofit legal organization established in 1992 to assist efforts to protect the environment. In 2003, it was placed on the 'Global 500 Roll of Honour' of the United Nations Environmental Program (UNEP). BELA was awarded the prestigious "Poribesh Puroshkar" (পরিবেশ পুরস্কার), or 'Environmental Prize', of the Bangladeshi government in 2007 and the joint winner of the Tang Prize in Rule of Law in 2020.

== Organization ==
Bangladeshi lawyer Dr. Mohiuddin Farooque established BELA in 1992 and was the first Chief Executive of the organization. From the very beginning BELA monitored compliance with Bangladesh's environmental Laws, took initiatives to increase environmental awareness and sought to ensure the development of proper environmental jurisprudence.

BELA faced a serious shock after the death of Dr. Farooque in 1997 and a member of BELA, advocate Ms. Rizwana Hasan took over the direction of BELA.

== Notable tasks ==
In 1994, election candidates for the Dhaka City Corporation were unlawfully campaigning in Old Dhaka in violation of the 1860s Environmental Law of Bangladesh. Rizwana Hasan brought suit in court and the Court judged it an unlawful act. Thereafter, Bangladesh Election Commission (EC) took initiatives to stop election campaigning that is harmful to the environment.

Under the supervision of Rizwana Hasan, BELA started its war against the shipbreaking industry in Bangladesh. On behalf of BELA, Rizwana brought the first suit against the shipbreaking industry, accusing it of creating an unsafe work environment and producing environmentally unsafe waste. Bela then brought another three suits demanding rights for the workers and the banning in Bangladesh of ships carrying poisonous substances. And in 2003 the court ruled that no ship will be allowed for shipbreaking without 'Environmental Clearance'.

BELA also took other initiatives where the environment is under threat, including housing covering wetlands, unnecessary usage of polythene, cutting of hills, deforestation, shrimp cultivation, and unlawful construction in St. Martin's Island.

In recent days, BELA opened a regular section in their headquarters where they receive legal complaints regarding the environment. BELA also sought judicial compensation from Naiko after the Tengratila Exploitation in 2006.

== Publications ==
BELA published many books on Environmental Preservation and Law Enforcement for Environment. Some of the notables are:

- Laws Regulating Environment in Bangladesh
- Law & Custom Forest in Bangladesh: Issues & Remedies
- Environmental Regulatory Regime
- Judicial Decisions on Environment in South Asia
- Trans-boundary Water Issues in South Asia
- International Rivers: Rights of the Riparian States
- River Pollution Concerns and Expectations
- The Role of Wildlife Preservation Act of Forest, Forest Dwellers
- International Law in Environment

Beside that, BELA published "BELA Newsletter" in English and "Bela Barta" (বেলা বার্তা) in Bangla, two weekly supplements of their recent activities and timeline.

== Awards ==
BELA achieved the 'Global 500 Roll of Honour' under United Nations Environmental Program (UNEP) in 2003. BELA, along with Dejusticia: The Center for Law, Justice and Society from Colombia and The Legal Agenda from Lebanon are joint winners of the 2020 Tang Prize in Rule of Law.

== See also ==
- Syeda Rizwana Hasan
