= Maksudul Ahsan =

Bangladeshi artist and poet (b. 1965)

- মাকসুদুল আহসান
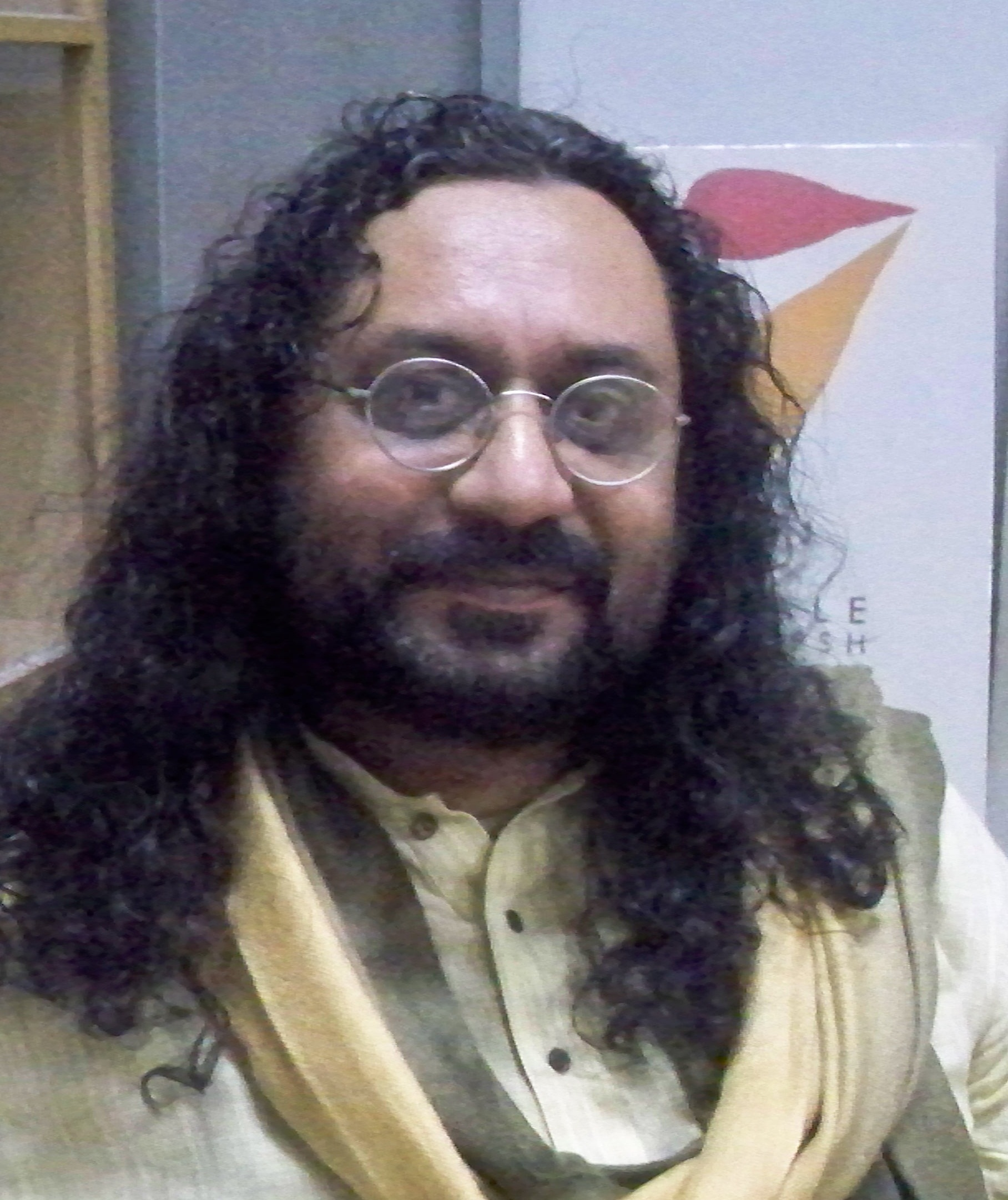
- Born: Maksudul Ahsan; 25 November 1965 (age 60); Chandpur, Bangladesh
- Education: Institute of Fine Arts of Dhaka University (1987)

Maksudul Ahsan (born November 11, 1965) is a Bangladeshi Artist , Poet, Actor, Curator, Art dealer sociocultural activist.

== Early life ==
Maksudul Ahsan was born in Chandpur. In 1987, he graduated from the Institute of Fine Arts of Dhaka University and in 1989, he obtained a master's degree there. In 1992, he received a diploma from the Academy of Planning and Development.

== Career ==
In 1989 he became a teacher of the College of Art in Khulna. In 1991 he became artistic editor of the weekly Shamoy Songglap in Dhaka. From 1994 to 2002, he lived and worked in Delhi (India). In 2008–2009, he was the editor of the weekly Shubarno Shodesh. In 2011 he became the chief executive director of the Gallery of Modern Art "Basilo" (Dhaka).

== Creativity ==
He produces moderately realistic as well as abstract images. He illustrates books. He published two collections of poems, Bashwashi Korotol and Shoundarjyer Staba, in 1989.

== Exhibitions ==
The first solo exhibition of the artist took place in the gallery "La Gallery" in Dhaka in 1994. Since then he has held 12 solo exhibitions in Bangladesh, India and Canada, and participated in more than 40 collective exhibitions in his homeland and abroad (India, Canada, Malaysia). In 2016, the National Gallery of Bangladesh held a retrospective, dedicated to the 25th anniversary of his creative activity. He organized eight art workshops in Dhaka, Delhi and Calcutta with the participation of artists from the countries of the South Asian Association for Regional Cooperation (SAARC).

== Collections ==
The artist's paintings are kept in the National Museum of Bangladesh, in the National Picture Gallery of Bangladesh, in the Shilpakala Academy (Dhaka), in the Sheraton and Pan Pacific Sonargaon hotels, the Ravi Jain Memorial Foundation in Delhi, the Dhohomi Mal and "Kunika" galleries (Delhi), as well as in private collections in Australia, England, Bangladesh, Germany, India, Canada, China, the Netherlands, Pakistan, Switzerland, and the US.

== Social activities ==
He is one of the founders of the society "Jania Abritti Charcha Kendra" (1987), executive director of the South Asian Society of Art and Culture (since 2003), and secretary general of the Arts and Cultural Society "Bandhan" (since 2004).
