= Shireen Akbar =

Indian-born British educator and an artist (1944–1997)

- Born: Shireen Hasib; 30 July 1944; Calcutta, India
- Died: 7 March 1997 (aged 52); London, England
- Education: University of Dhaka; Murray Edwards College, Cambridge
- Occupations: Educator, museum exhibitor
- Children: 1 daughter

Shireen Akbar MBE (30 July 1944 – 7 March 1997) was an Indian-born British educator and an artist. She became well known for her contributions to the education and general social upliftment of South Asian women in England. She was appointed MBE on 14 June 1996 for her contributions to arts and community education.

== Early life ==
Shireen Nishat Hasib was born to a wealthy Bengali Muslim family in Calcutta on 30 July 1944. In 1957, the family moved to Dhaka, East Pakistan (present-day Bangladesh) where she completed her Master's degree at the University of Dhaka before taking a job as a teacher there. In 1968, she left Bangladesh for England to study English at New Hall, now called Murray Edwards College, Cambridge. After graduating in 1970, she went on to receive a teaching qualification in primary education from Cambridge Institute of Education.

Following the completion of her education, she was employed by the Inner London Education Authority (ILEA) in 1978 as a youth social worker, a tutor and an interpreter to Bengali girls and young women in the London Borough of Tower Hamlets. Incorporating original ideas, she used the arts to link Britain's Asian communities. One of her first projects was to have groups of girls create embroidered banners showing the Bengali alphabet by groups of girls. Their work was displayed in East London's Whitechapel Gallery in early 1979.

=== Museum educator ===
In 1991 she was officially appointed the South Asian Arts Education Officer at the Victoria and Albert Museum where she built connections between the museum's Nehru Gallery and her students in local communities. Because she joined the Museum staff during the week of a devastating cyclone in Bangladesh that killed many thousands of people, Akbar's first activity was to immediately organize a fund raiser featuring a sitar concert. The program was a success and funded a new cyclone shelter in Bangladesh.

Her final project, ''Shamiana: The Mughal Tent,'' incorporated hand-made work by women from around the world. Her idea began in 1991, when she invited "South Asian women and girls living in London to visit the museum's Nehru Gallery of Indian Art. She began by calling on neighborhood groups in East London and showing them slides of the Victoria and Albert collection. For many of the women, the subsequent tour of the gallery -- with talks in Bengali, Urdu, Hindi, Gujarati and Punjabi -- was their first museum experience."

Project participants were asked to craft 10-by-4-foot panels for a nomadic tent telling "new, culturally diverse stories through traditional needlework and innovative techniques." News of the project spread by word-of-mouth and panels arrived from many countries. The completed 66 panels were displayed on rotation at the Museum from June through September 1997, shortly after Akbar's death.

=== Personal life ===
In 1996, Akbar was made a member of the Order of the British Empire (MBE) for her accomplishments in the South Asian communities of London.

She married Anwar Akbar in 1968 and they had one daughter (the marriage was dissolved). Akbar died in London from breast cancer on 7 March 1997 at age 52.

== Awards ==
- India Travel Award 1992 for the development of a collection for educational purposes
