= Ehsan H. Feroz =

American professor

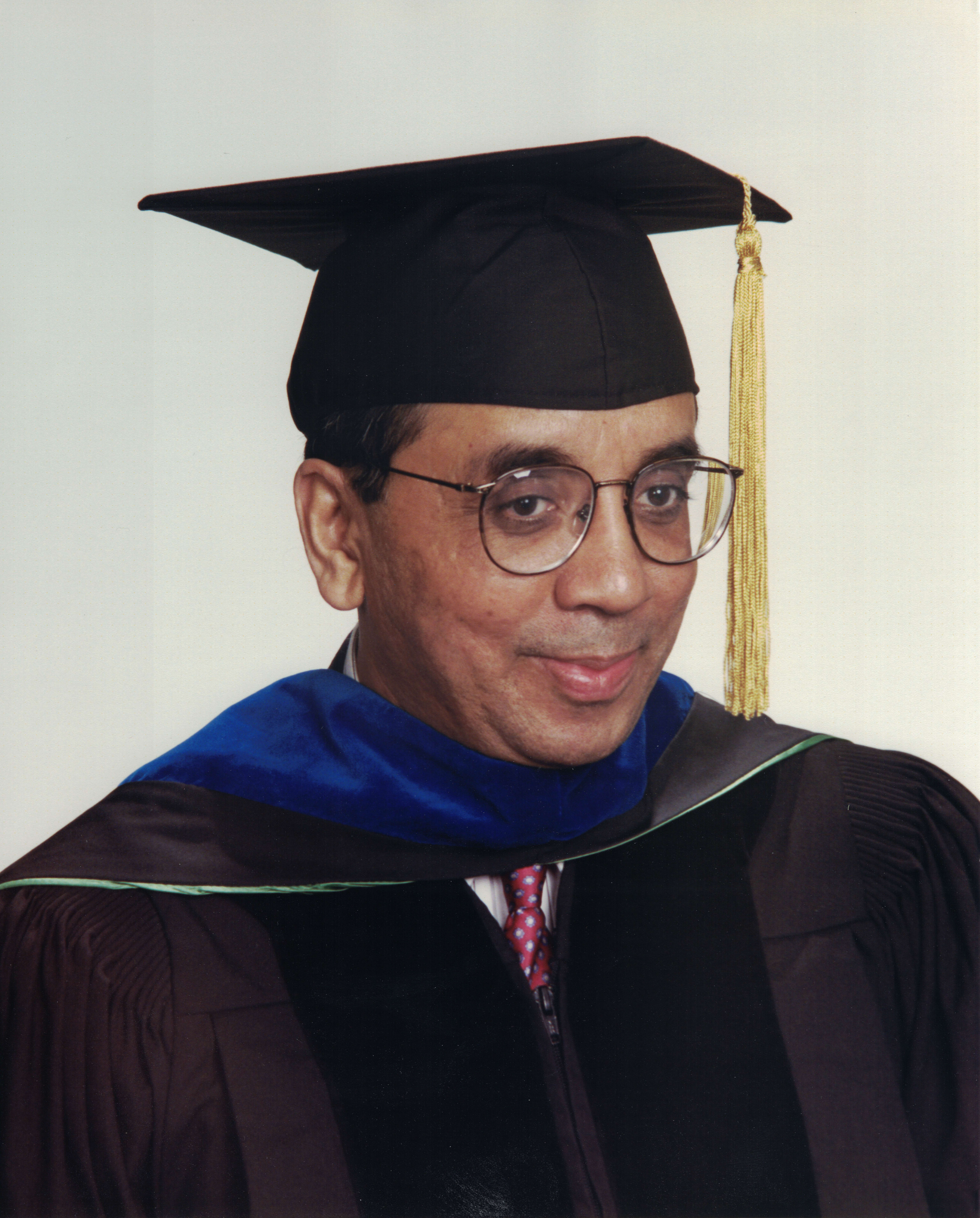
- Occupations: Professor, researcher, and author

Academic background
- Education: Ph.D. MA
- Alma mater: The University of Chicago; Carleton University; University of Dhaka

Academic work
- Discipline: Governance of the public and private sector institutions Governance of the financial accounting regulatory standards Institutional Theory; US SEC’s regulatory enforcement actions
- Institutions: University of Washington Tacoma; University of Minnesota Duluth; University of Minnesota; City University of New York; State University of New York at Buffalo

Ehsan H. Feroz is a Bangladeshi-born Muslim American professor, researcher, and an author. He is a tenured full professor of accounting at the University of Washington Tacoma’s Milgard School of Business and served as the Director of the Master of Accounting Program.

Feroz’s main research interests include the governance of the public and private sector institutions, governance of the financial accounting regulatory standards, institutional theory, and the US Securities and Exchange Commission’s regulatory enforcement actions, among others.

Feroz is a Life-Emeritus member of the American Accounting Association, and an alumnus of the Oxford Round Table.

== Education ==
Feroz earned an MA from the University of Dhaka in 1974 and an MA from Carleton University in 1978. He earned a Ph.D. from The University of Chicago with an interdisciplinary dissertation entitled, "Interest Groups and the Process of Financial Accounting Standards Setting" in 1982.

== Career ==
Feroz was an assistant professor of accounting at the State University of New York at Buffalo from 1983 till 1986 and at the Baruch College of the City University of New York from 1986 till 1989. He was a visiting assistant professor of accounting at the University of Minnesota from 1989 to 1991. He was a tenured associate professor of accounting at the University of Minnesota Duluth (UMD) from 1991 till 1993, and a full professor of accounting at UMD from 1993 till 2005. While teaching at UMD, he was selected to serve as the Special Project Associate of the Vice Chancellor for Academic Administration in 1995.

In 2005, he became a tenured full professor of accounting at the University of Washington, Tacoma’s Milgard School of Business, and served as the Director of the Master of Accounting Program from 2016 till 2020. Feroz also served three consecutive terms (2002-2009) as a member of the US Comptroller General’s Advisory Council on Government Auditing Standards.

== Research and work ==
Feroz’s major contributions have been to the governance of the financial accounting regulatory standards, the US Securities and Exchange Commission’s regulatory enforcement actions, institutional theory, and the governance of the public and private sector institutions. His published articles in the premier academic journals have impacted the interdisciplinary thought processes through numerous follow-up studies in accounting, finance and environmental economy, and subsequent legislative enactments. In particular, the US Sarbanes-Oxley Act of 2002, Section 704 Study of Enforcement Actions was preceded by the seminal contributions of Feroz, Kyung Joo Park and Victor S. Pastena.

In 1991, Feroz co-authored a paper entitled,"The Financial and Market Effects of the SEC's Accounting and Auditing Enforcement Releases," with Kyung Joo Park and Victor S Pastena. The paper explored the types of accounting and auditing problems which lead to enforcement actions by the SEC, the consequences of investigations on target's financial statements, and market perception of such actions by SEC. SEC's governance enforcement program is designed "to concentrate on particular problem areas and to anticipate emerging problems." After examining 224 Accounting and Auditing Enforcement Releases, Feroz and his co-authors described the results of investigations against 188 firms. According to their results, the SEC "most often pursued overstatements of accounts receivable and inventories resulting from premature revenue recognition and delayed write-off, respectively." The income effects of these financial disclosure violations averaged more than 50% of reported income. They found that disclosing these reporting violations changed the "expectations of target’s future earnings as reflected in financial analysts’ reduced earnings estimated after the disclosures."

Feroz’s article with Vivian L. Carpenter entitled, "Institutional Theory and Accounting Rule Choice: Analyses of the Four US State Government’s Decisions to Adopt Generally Accepted Accounting Principles," analyzed four US state governments’ decisions to adopt generally accepted accounting principles (GAAP) for external financial reporting. In this research, he and his coauthor developed the institutional theory to explain how institutional pressures exerted on the four US state governments influenced the decisions of these governments to adopt or resist the use of GAAP for external financial reporting. The authors identified resource dependency on the government bonds market as a potent form of coercive institutional pressure that was associated with early GAAP adoptions. The main contribution of this study are the articulation of the sources of institutional pressures that affect the choice of accounting governance practices by state governments, and the identification of conditions under which resource dependency has its greatest influence as an effective coercive institutional pressure for changing accounting governance rule choices in the public sector. The authors also demonstrate that the power with which institutional pressures can influence governance practices vary over time, given the set of actors in place and their initial strategic response to institutional pressure for change. They also documented that there can be significant variation in the presence and effect of institutional pressures over time based on constantly changing endogenous and exogenous factors, including cognitive beliefs of the organizational decision makers.<ref.Carpenter, Vivian L.; Feroz, Ehsan H. (2001). "Institutional theory and accounting rule choice: an analysis of four US state governments' decisions to adopt generally accepted accounting principles". Accounting, Organizations and Society. 26 (7–8): 565–596. doi:10.1016/S0361-3682(00)00038-6. S2CID 154771825.</ref>

Inspired by Coase’s theory of the firm (1937), Feroz’s article with Sungsoo Kim and Raymond Raab entitled, "Financial Statement Analysis: A Data Envelopment Analysis Approach," demonstrated that Data Envelopment Analysis (DEA) can augment the traditional ratio analysis especially, if the goal is to provide a consistent and reliable measure of the firm-specific production or managerial efficiencies of a firm. The authors empirically demonstrated their case by using time series data from the oil and gas, pharmaceutical, and primary metals industries. Feroz’s recent research topics include the governance of the financial accounting regulatory standards (scholarly monograph in-progress), and textual and contextual analysis of the US SEC's governance enforcement pronouncements.

== Awards and honors ==
- 1979 - Invited Guest of the Institute at the Center for International Studies, MIT
- 2004 - Alumnus of the Oxford Round Table
- 2005 - One Thousand Great Americans
- 2006 - Emerald Literati Network’s “Highly Commended Paper Award”
- 2010 - Cornelius Tierney /Ernst & Young Research Award, U.S. Association of Government Accountants’ (AGA)
- 2018 - Ranked 20th among the SSRN Top 1500 Accounting Authors in terms of Number of Papers (June 1, 2018)
- 2020 - In the Top 10% of Authors on SSRN by All-Time Downloads (September 7, 2020)
- 2020 -"Total Research Interest [score of 881.2] is higher than 93% of researchers on ResearchGate" (September 7, 2020)

== Selected articles ==
- Feroz, E. H., Park, K. J. and Pastena, V., “The Financial and Market Effects of the SEC's Accounting and Auditing Enforcement Releases”. Journal of Accounting Research Vol. 29, pp. 107–142, Supplement 1991.
- Feroz, E. H. and Wilson, E. R., “Market Segmentation and the Association between Municipal Financial Disclosures and Net Interest Costs”. The Accounting Review, Vol. 67, No. 3, July 1992.
- Carpenter, V. L. and Feroz, E. H., “GAAP as a Symbol of Legitimacy: New York State’s Decision to Adopt Generally Accepted Accounting Principles”. Accounting, Organizations and Society, Vol. 17, No. 7 (Lead Article), 1992.
- Carpenter, V. L. and Feroz, Ehsan H., “Institutional Theory and Accounting Rule Choice: An Analysis of the Four U.S. State Governments' Decisions to Adopt Generally Accepted Accounting Principles”. Accounting, Organizations, and Society Vol. 26, No. 7 (Lead Article), pp. 565–596, 2001.
- Feroz, E.H., S. Kim and Raab, R.L. “Financial Statement Analysis: A Data Envelopment Analysis Approach.” Journal of the Operational Research Society, 54(1) 48-58, 2003.
- Carpenter, V. L., Cheng, R.H. and Feroz, E. H., “Toward an Empirical Institutional Governance Theory: Analyses of the Decisions by the 50 U.S. State Governments to Adopt Generally Accepted Accounting Principles”. Corporate Ownership & Control, Vol. 4, Issue 4, Summer 2007, pp. 42–59.
- Raab, R. L. and Feroz, E. H., “A Productivity Growth Accounting Approach to the Ranking of Developing and Developed Nations”. The International Journal of Accounting, Vol. 42, 2007, pp. 396–415.
- Alsharif, K A., Feroz, E. H., Klemer, A. and Raab, R. L., “Governance of the Water Supply Systems in the Palestinian Territories: A Data Envelopment Analysis Approach to the Management of Water Resources”. Journal of Environmental Management, Vol. 87, pp. 80–94, 2008.
- Feroz, E. H. and Raab, R. L. and Ulleberg, G. T. and Alsharif, K., “Global Warming and Environmental Production Efficiency Ranking of the Kyoto Protocol Nations”. Journal of Environmental Management, Vol. 90, pp. 1178–1183, 2009.
- Leng, F., Feroz, E. H. Cao, Z. and Davalos, S., “The Long‐Term Performance and Failure Risk of Firms Cited in the US SEC's Accounting and Auditing Enforcement Releases” (September/October 2011). Journal of Business Finance & Accounting, Vol. 38, Issue 7‐8, pp. 813–841.
- Banker, R. D., Chang, H. and Feroz, E. H., “Performance Measurement in Not-for-Profit Governance: An Empirical Study of the Minnesota Independent School Districts”. Annals of Operations Research, Vol.221, Issue No.1, October 2014, 47-71.
- Cao, Z., Leng, F, Feroz, E. H. and Davalos, S., “Corporate Governance and Default Risk of Firms Cited in the SEC's Accounting and Auditing Enforcement Releases”. Review of Quantitative Finance and Accounting, 2015, Vol.44, No.1, pp .113-138.
