= Mohammad Hadis Uddin =

Bangladeshi police officer (1949–2021)

- মোহাম্মদ হাদিস উদ্দিন

Inspector General of Police of Bangladesh Police
- In office 7 April 2005 – 7 May 2005
- Preceded by: Ashraful Huda
- Succeeded by: Abdul Kaium

Personal details
- Born: 6 February 1949 Khaliajuri Upazila, East Bengal, Pakistan
- Died: 7 August 2021 (aged 72) Dhaka, Bangladesh
- Education: Dhaka College; University of Dhaka

Mohammad Hadis Uddin (6 February 1949 – 7 August 2021) was a Bangladeshi police officer who served as the inspector general of police in 2005.

He was then transferred to the establishment ministry.

== Career ==
Uddin was an officer of the police cadre service of the 1973 batch. He served as deputy commander in the UN Mission in Cambodia in 1993 and minister in the Bangladesh High Commission in New Delhi from 1998 to 2003.

Uddin was the additional IGP (finance and development) at the police headquarters before being appointed the inspector general of police.

== Death ==
Uddin died from COVID-19 in August 2021.
