= Zaidi Sattar =

Zaidi Sattar is a Bangladeshi economist and chairman of the Policy Research Institute. He is a retired civil servant and former economist at the World Bank.

== Early life ==
Sattar completed his bachelor's degree in economics at the University of Dhaka in 1967. He completed his master's degree in economics at the University of Karachi in 1968.

== Career ==
In 1968, Sattar joined the University of Dhaka as a lecturer of economics. He joined the Central Superior Services the next year. After the Independence of Bangladesh, he joined the Bangladesh Civil Service.

Sattar finished his PhD at Boston University in economics in 1984. He became a faculty of the Catholic University of America where he worked till 1992. From 1992 to 1995, he was an advisor of World Bank to the National Board of Revenue. From 1995 to 1996, he was an UNDP consultant at the Bangladesh Planning Commission. From 1996 to September 2007, he worked at the World Bank office in Bangladesh.

From October 2007 to December 2008, Sattar was the vice-chancellor of Millennium University. In April 2008, he was elected an independent director of Southeast Bank Limited. In December 2008, he became the founding chairman of the Policy Research Institute.

In February 2020, Sattar said export diversification for Bangladesh was tied to the availability of bonded warehouses. Sattar had called for pressure on the government of Myanmar to take back the Rohingya Refugees in Bangladesh. He is a director of the Industrial and Infrastructure Development Finance Company Limited, Southeast Bank Foundation, Southeast Bank Capital Services Limited, and Venture Investment Partners Bangladesh Limited. He is a former director of Bay Leasing and Investment Limited and Asia Insurance Limited.

Sattar has opposed the government of Bangladesh providing subsidies to import substituting industries of Bangladesh.

After the fall of the Sheikh Hasina led Awami League government, Sattar expressed support for the revolution and various reform initiatives of the Muhmmad Yunus led interim government.

== Bibliography ==
- Bangladesh Trade Policy for Growth and Employment: Collected Essays, 2019.
