= Mohiuddin Farooque =

Mohiuddin Farooque was a lawyer, environmentalist, and founder of the Bangladesh Environmental Lawyers Association. He was the litigant in the landmark cases, Dr. Mohiuddin Farooque v Bangladesh (1995), dealing with public interest litigation, and Mohiuddin Farooque v Bangladesh (1996), dealing with environmental protection.

== Early life ==
Farooque completed his bachelor's and master's in law at the University of Dhaka. He was born on 25 June 1954 in Gopalganj District, Bangladesh. His father was Hemayet Ahmed, and his mother was Anwara Ahmed. He completed his PhD at the University of Manchester in 1985.

== Career ==
In 1993, Farooque established the Bangladesh Environmental Lawyers Association.

Farooque was the plaintiff in the landmark Dr. Mohiuddin Farooque v Bangladesh (1995), which established public interest litigation in Bangladesh. His next case, Mohiuddin Farooque v Bangladesh (1996), was the first time a court in Bangladesh recognized environmental protection. Dr. Mohiuddin Farooque v. Bangladesh 55 DLR (2003) was another landmark legal case.

== Bibliography ==
- International Rivers: Rights of Riparian State

== Personal life ==
Farooque was married to Salima Farooque, and they had two children. His son, Issa Nibras Farooque, is a Canadian musician who created the Farooque Bhai Project named after him.

== Death ==
Farooque died on 2 December 1997 at the National University Hospital, Singapore. He had a fungal infection of the lungs. Syeda Rizwana Hasan succeeded him as the chief executive officer of the Bangladesh Environmental Lawyers Association. He was buried at the Mirpur Martyred Intellectual Graveyard.
