= Kaiser Haq =

Bangladeshi translator, critic and academic

- কায়সার হক
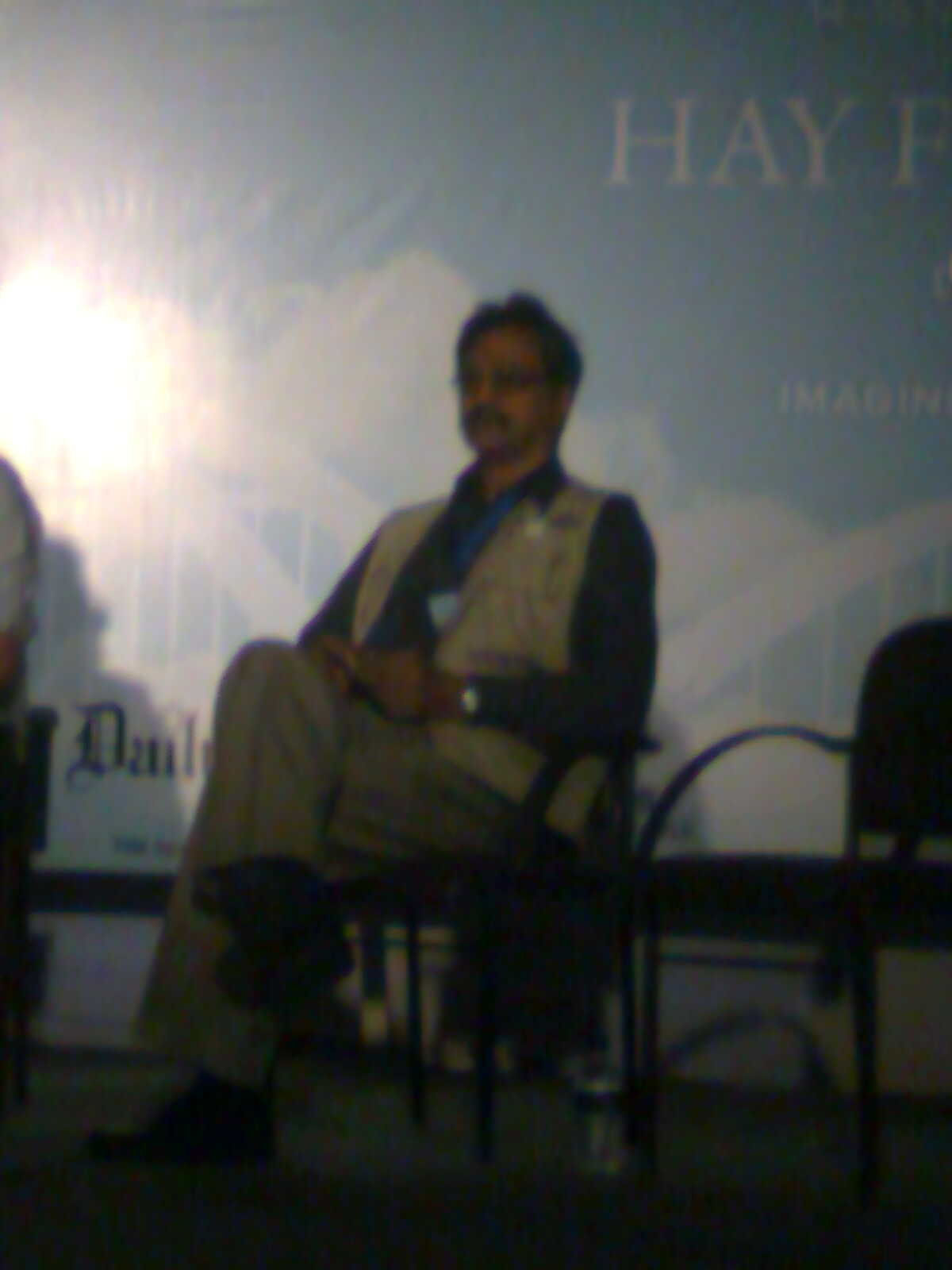
- Kaiser Haq at Bangla Academy in Dhaka (Nov 2013)
- Born: 7 December 1950 (age 75); Dhaka, Bangladesh
- Education: Dhaka College University of Dhaka; University of Warwick
- Occupations: Professor; writer; translator
- Spouse: Dipa Haq (m. 1976; died 1999). Syeda Zinath Haq (Shumi) (m. 2001)
- Awards: Bangla Academy Literary Award (2014)

Kaiser Hamidul Haq (born 7 December 1950) is a Bangladeshi translator, critic and academic. Known for his translations from Bengali into English, Haq is a recipient of Bangla Academy Literary Award (2013) in the category of translation. He is a former professor of English at the University of Dhaka. In the liberation war of Bangladesh, he fought against Pakistani Army "as a freshly commissioned subaltern in command of a company".

== Education and career ==
Haq passed SSC from St. Gregory the Great High School and HSC from Dhaka College. He then enrolled into the English Department of University of Dhaka for his BA and MA degrees. He immediately joined the faculty of the same university. After he received Commonwealth Scholarship he moved to England to complete his PhD from University of Warwick in 1981. He continued his research as a Senior Fulbright Scholar and Vilas Fellow at the University of Wisconsin–Milwaukee.

After he returned to Bangladesh, he joined the University of Dhaka faculty and went to become professor. As of 2015, he is on leave and is teaching Modern Poetry and Creative writing at University of Liberal Arts Bangladesh. He is also teaching part-time at the universities which include BRAC University, East West University and North South University.

== Personal life ==
Kaiser married Dipa Haq in 1976. She died in 1999.

Kaiser married Syeda Zinath Haq (Shumi) on 15 April 2001. They have a daughter, Raina Haq (20 December 2003) .

== Selected publications ==
=== Poetry ===
- Pariah and Other Poems (Bengal Lights Books, Dhaka. 2013)
- Published in the Streets of Dhaka: Collected Poems 1966-2006 (writers.ink, Dhaka, 2007). Enlarged, 2012 (UPL)
- The Logopathic Reviewer’s Song and Other Pieces (Aark Arts, London and UPL, Dhaka, 2002).
- Black Orchid, London: Aark Arts, 1996.
- A Happy Farewell, Dhaka: UPL, 1994
- Starting Lines, Dhaka, 1978.
- A Little Ado, Dhaka, 1978.
- Selected Poems of Shamsur Rahman (trans.), Dhaka: BRAC, 1985. (Enlarged edition, Dhaka: Pathak Samabesh, 2008)
- Contemporary Indian Poetry (editor), Ohio State University Press, 1990.

=== Prose ===
- Quartet (trans. of R.Tagore’s Chaturanga), Heinemann, U.K., 1993
- The Wonders of Vilayet (trans. of the first Indian travel book on Europe), Peepal Tree
- Books, Leeds, 2002 (A section, titled ‘Passage to Scotland’, excerpted in The Scotsman). New edition: Delhi, Chroniclebooks, 2007. Bangladeshi edition: Writers Ink
- The Perfect Model and Other Stories by Anis Chowdhury (Dhaka : Writers, Ink) translation
- The Woman Who Flew by Nasreen Jahan (Penguin India 2012)
- The Triumph of The Snake Goddess (Harvard University Press, 2015)
