= Miftahur Rahman =

Bangladeshi physicist

- Citizenship: Bangladesh
- Education: University of Dacca; Marquette University; University of Massachusetts Lowell
- Known for: Optical communication Cellular networks Computer science
- Scientific career
- Fields: Electrical engineering Optical physics Telecommunications
- Workplaces: Lincoln Laboratory, MIT; Arthur D. Little, Inc. Grameen Shakti; East West University; North South University

Miftahur Rahman is a Bangladeshi physicist in the area of optical communication systems, Wireless and mobile technology.

He received his BS degree in 1976 and M.Sc. degree in 1977, both in the field of physics from the University of Dacca, in Bangladesh. After serving a short time as a lecturer in the Department of Physics, at the Bangladesh University of Engineering and Technology, he received a second master's degree in 1983, an MS in solid-state physics from Marquette University in Milwaukee, Wisconsin. In 1988, he received a PhD in solid-state physics and optics from the University of Massachusetts Lowell. His thesis was conducted at the Lincoln Laboratory at Massachusetts Institute of Technology. Following his education, he worked as a consultant in Arthur D. Little, Inc. from 1988 to 1989 and then as a research associate for the Institute for Plastics Innovation (IPI) from 1990 to 1995.

He served as a technical manager, from 1995 to 1997 at Grameen Shakti, a sub-division of 2006 Nobel Peace Prize winning Grameen Bank in Dhaka, Bangladesh. He served as a professor and proctor at East West University from 1997 to January 2002. In spring 2002 he joined in the Department of Computer Science and Engineering, at North South University (NSU), Dhaka, Bangladesh. Since then he has been with NSU as the chairman of the department from 2003 to 2007.

He is also serving as the director of the Center for Information and Communication Technology (CICT), an industrial academia consortium at North South University and well known for organizing the first ever International Conference of the Next Generation Wireless Systems in 2006 in Dhaka, Bangladesh, with the sponsorship of IEEE Communications Society. Rahman, along with the Minister of Science, has spoken nationally for a technological platform for the nation. He was also active in other national educational endeavours in the sciences.

== Background ==
He has said that "In the world of electronics, experimentation is a very expensive task. Before we can produce a single chip in the industry, we have to verify every aspect of it minutely. So, rather than investing large amount of money in making prototypes of a device, simulating the hardware can be implemented to exponentially reduce costs. FPGA and PLD are such tools that help to simulate real hardware. That is the reason this course will help the students, especially the engineering students to have a much better and more practical view on these tools. We have a gold mine of creative minds. But due to our age-old education system, lack of progress in the research and development sector and many other socio-economic reasons obstruct us to nourish those minds. Our sons and daughters are making their mark abroad but Bangladesh still lacks necessary proactive and creative engineers. Such prestigious courses will help develop those enthusiasts and create an opportunity within the country to think and create and contribute to the country's technological development".

In order to promote the software industry of Bangladesh, Rahman has said "We are trying to grow enthusiasm among students, who are capable of producing software, which can compete at international level". In addition, he chaired other events to establish a world class telecommunication backbone network and services industry in Bangladesh.

== Selected work ==
- ——; Mridul Khan; Sheikh Iqbal Ahamed; Ji-Jiang Yang (2012). "Gesthaar: An accelerometer-based gesture recognition method and its application in NUI driven pervasive healthcare". 2012 IEEE International Conference on Emerging Signal Processing Applications. Las Vegas, NV, USA. pp. 163–166. doi:10.1109/ESPA.2012.6152471. ISBN 978-1-4673-0899-1. S2CID 16419866.
- ——; Sajjadul Latif; Tasnia Ahad; Shabbir Ahmed; Barnali Rashid; Preyom Kanti Dey; M. F. Rabbi Ur Rashid (2011). "The Study of OFDM ICI Cancellation Schemes in 2.4 GHZ Frequency Band Using Software Defined Radio". 2011 7th International Conference on Wireless Communications, Networking and Mobile Computing. Wuhan, China. pp. 1–6. doi:10.1109/wicom.2011.6040059. ISBN 978-1-4244-6250-6. S2CID 15486860.
- ——; Sajjadul Latif; Tasnia Ahad (2011). "An Experimental Study of ICI Cancellation in OFDM Utilizing GNU Radio System". ICWMC 2011, the Seventh International Conference on Wireless and Mobile Communications: 94–100. ISBN 978-1-61208-140-3.
- ——; Neel Kamal Saha; Rajendra N. Sarkar (2011). "Comparison of Musical Pitch Analysis Between LPC and CELP". International Journal of Advances in Engineering Sciences. 1. ISSN 2231-0347.
- ——; C. Yang; K. S. Chiu; A. S. Karakashian; C. Karp; T. Mooney; G. Al-Jumaily (1992). "Development of a Computer Program for the Determination of Optical Constants of Radiation Damaged Optical Elements Using Classical Oscillator Fit to Reflectance and/or Transmittrnce Data". MRS Proceedings. 247: 889–895. doi:10.1557/PROC-247-889.
- ——; N. R. Schott (1992). "Defect Studies of the Transparent/Translucent Plastic Products Ujith the Polarized Light". MRS Proceedings. 247: 877–882. doi:10.1557/PROC-247-877.
