= Mithila Farzana =

Bangladeshi journalist

- মিথিলা ফারজানা
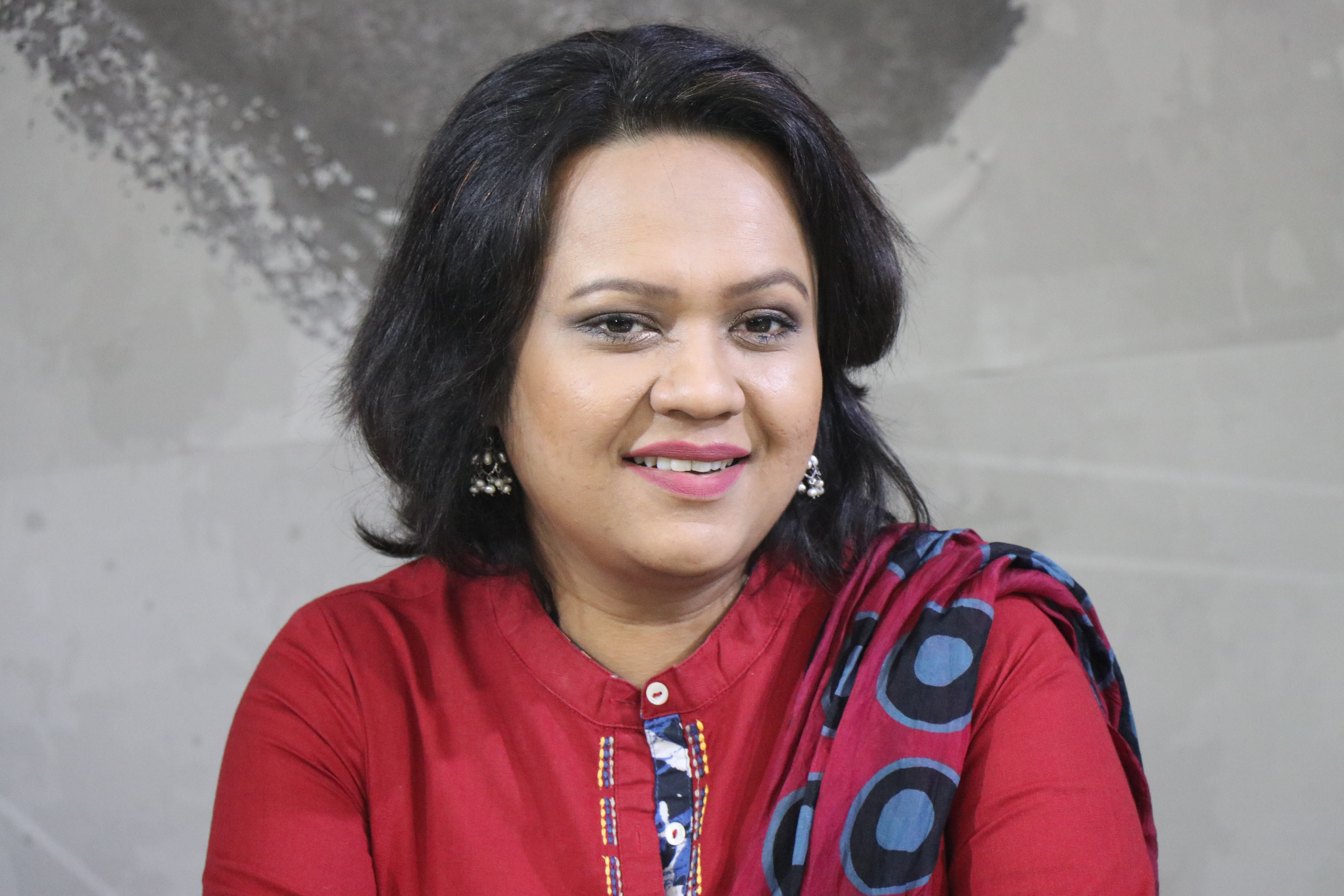
- Farzana in 2018

Former Head of Current Affairs at Ekattor Television

Counsellor at the Bangladesh High Commission in Ottawa, Canada
- In office 15 November 2023 – 30 August 2024

Mithila Farzana, born Mobashwira Farzana Mithila, is a Bangladeshi journalist and former counsellor at the Bangladesh High Commission in Ottawa, Canada. She was the Head of Current Affairs at Ekattor Television.

Farzana was a lecturer of the Institute of Disaster Management in the University of Dhaka.

She was among the 32 journalists that have had a complaint filed against them at the International Crimes Tribunal accusing them of genocide related to the deaths during protests which removed Prime Minister Sheikh Hasina from office, however Farzana was busy working as a counsellor in Canada during the protests in Bangladesh.

Additionally, the Director of Advocacy and Assistance of Reporters Without Borders (RSF) Antoine Bernard has said about the accusations, "the purge of journalists who are considered to be affiliated with the former government has reached a new level. Media professionals are bearing the brunt of the need for vengeance that permeates this terrible legal cabal..."

== Career ==
Farzana joined Ekattor TV as a news presenter. She had served as the Current Affairs Editor. She had hosted television show Ekattor Journal where panelist Mainul Hosein got into an argument with fellow panelist and journalist Masuda Bhatti. Masuda Bhatti filed a defamation case against Hosein in which he was detained. She spoke on a panel of UNESCO about online violence she has faced as a female journalist.

Farzana has criticized Bangladeshi companies having to pay 55 million BDT to telecast TVCs while Indian companies only had to pay 150 thousand.

Farzana was appointed director of the Public Diplomacy Wing at the Ministry of Foreign Affairs in November 2023 with the rank of Deputy Secretary. It was a two-year appointment. After the resignation of Prime Minister Sheikh Hasina and the fall of the Awami League government, she and Aparna Rani Pal were recalled to the Ministry of Foreign Affairs from their posts at the Bangladesh High Commission in Ottawa, Canada. On 29 August 2024, a case of genocide was filed by Gazi MH Tamim against 52 of which were 32 journalists including Farzana, at the International Crimes Tribunal. The accused also included former Prime Minister Sheikh Hasina and the journalist were accused of "inciting" her.
