= Sultana N. Nahar =

Bangladeshi-American physicist

Sultana Nurun Nahar
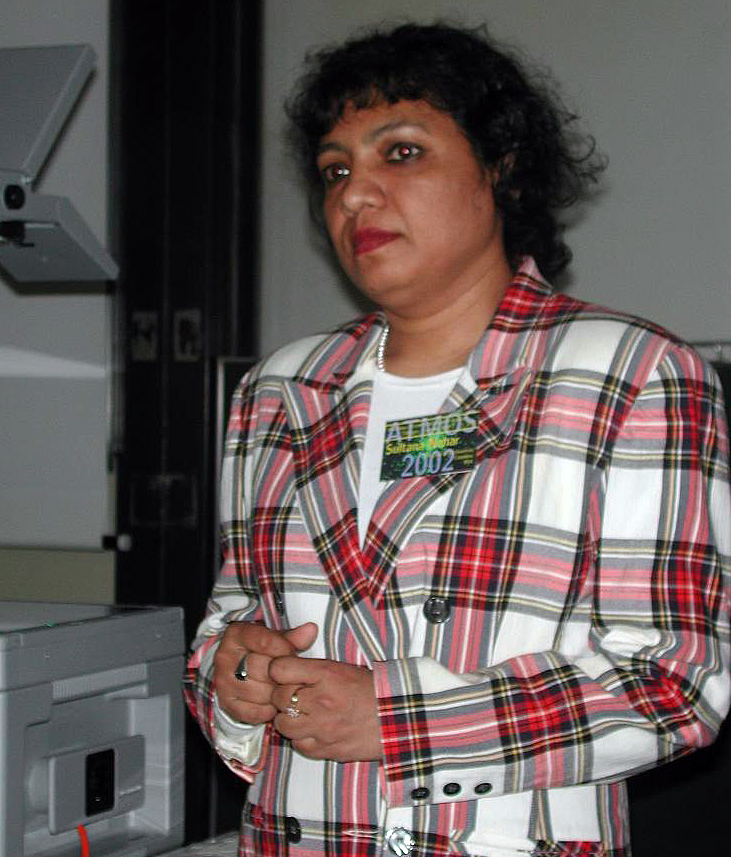
- Nahar giving a talk in Germany
- Education: PhD (Atomic Theory)
- Alma mater: University of Dhaka; Wayne State University
- Website: www.astronomy.ohio-state.edu/~nahar/

Sultana Nurun Nahar is a Bangladeshi-American physicist. She is a research scientist in the Department of Astronomy at Ohio State University.

Her research is on atomic processes of photoionization, electron-ion recombination, photoexcitation, collision. Her contributions include development of the unified method for total electron-ion recombination, theoretical spectroscopy for Breit-Pauli R-matrix method, resonant nano-plasma theranostics (RNPT) method for cancer treatment.

== Education and career ==
Nahar completed her undergraduate education in Physics and M.Sc. in Theoretical Physics at the University of Dhaka, and earned an M.A. in Quantum Optics and Ph.D. in Atomic Theory at Wayne State University in Detroit, Michigan.

She is an author of the textbook Atomic Astrophysics and Spectroscopy (Cambridge UP, 2011), along with Anil K. Pradhan.

== Research interests ==
Nahar has published extensively on radiative and collisional atomic processes in astrophysical and laboratory plasmas, including Photoionization, electron-ion recombination, photo-excitations and de-excitations, and electron-ion scattering. She has also worked on dielectronic satellite lines, theoretical spectroscopy, and computational nanospectroscopy for biomedical applications. She is a member of the international collaborations, "Opacity Project" and "Iron Project," to study radiative and collisional atomic processes and calculate accurate atomic parameters for astrophysically abundant atoms and ions.

== Awards ==
She was elected as a Fellow of the American Physical Society in 2006, for "seminal contributions to studies of photoionization and recombination of multicharged atomic systems fundamental to atomic physics and plasma physics and pioneering calculations of remarkable complexity on astrophysically significant processes".

In 2013, she won the John Wheatley Award of the American Physical Society "for efforts to promote physics research and teaching through collaboration, mentoring, and philanthropy in several third-world countries, and in particular for her promotion, as both an advocate and role model, of Muslim women scientists".
