= Khan Sarwar Murshid =

Bangladeshi educationist and diplomat

- খাঁন সারওয়ার মুরশিদ

Vice-Chancellor of the University of Rajshahi
- In office 1 February 1972 – 3 August 1974
- Preceded by: Muhammad Abdul Bari
- Succeeded by: Mazharul Islam

Personal details
- Born: 1 July 1924 Comilla, Tipperah District, Bengal Province
- Died: 8 December 2012 (aged 88) Dhaka, Bangladesh
- Resting place: Mirpur Martyred Intellectual Graveyard, Dhaka
- Spouse: Nurjahan Beg (m. 1948–2003)
- Children: 4, including Khan Ahmed Sayeed Murshid and Sharmeen Murshid
- Education: University of Nottingham
- Occupation: Educationist, diplomat
- Awards: Bangla Academy Literary Award

Khan Sarwar Murshid (Bengali: খাঁন সারওয়ার মুরশিদ; 1 July 1924 – 8 December 2012) was a Bangladeshi educationist and diplomat.

== Early life and education ==
Sarwar Murshid was born on 1 July 1924 at his maternal grandparents' home in Comilla, Tipperah District, Bengal Province. His mother's name was Siddiqua. His father, Ali Ahmed Khan, was an advocate and All-India Muslim League politician who served as a member in both the Bengal Legislative Assembly and the East Pakistan Provincial Assembly.

Murshid was raised largely in Brahmanbaria town. After completing his primary education at home, he enrolled at the George High School in Brahmanbaria, from where he passed his matriculation in 1939. Murshid then proceeded to complete his FA from Feni Government College. He then moved on to study at the Comilla Victoria Government College, and then studied English at the University of Dhaka. He later moved to the United Kingdom to study at the University of Nottingham, receiving his Master of Arts in English language and literature in 1948.

== Career ==
From 1948 onward, he was a faculty member of the English Department of Dhaka University, becoming a full professor in 1970. During the 1971 liberation war, he was a member of the planning commission of the Mujibnagar government-in-exile. He served as vice chancellor of Rajshahi University during 1972–75. As a diplomat, he served as the Bangladeshi high commissioner to Poland, Hungary, and Czechoslovakia, and he was appointed assistant secretary general to the Commonwealth Secretariat in 1978. He was the first chairman of the Bangladeshi branch of Transparency International, an anti-corruption body, and was a trustee until his death.

Between 1949 and 1965, Murshid edited a literary journal called New Values. Among his students at Dhaka University were future Bengali intellectuals such as Shamsur Rahman, Abdul Mannan Syed, and Zillur Rahman Siddiqui. He was a Fellow of the Asiatic Society of Bangladesh and a recipient of the Bangla Academy Literary Award for Research and Essay. He was offered the Ekushey Award in 2010, which he declined. Among other distinctions of note that he received was the UN Citizen of the Year Award of the Bangladesh Chapter in 2011.

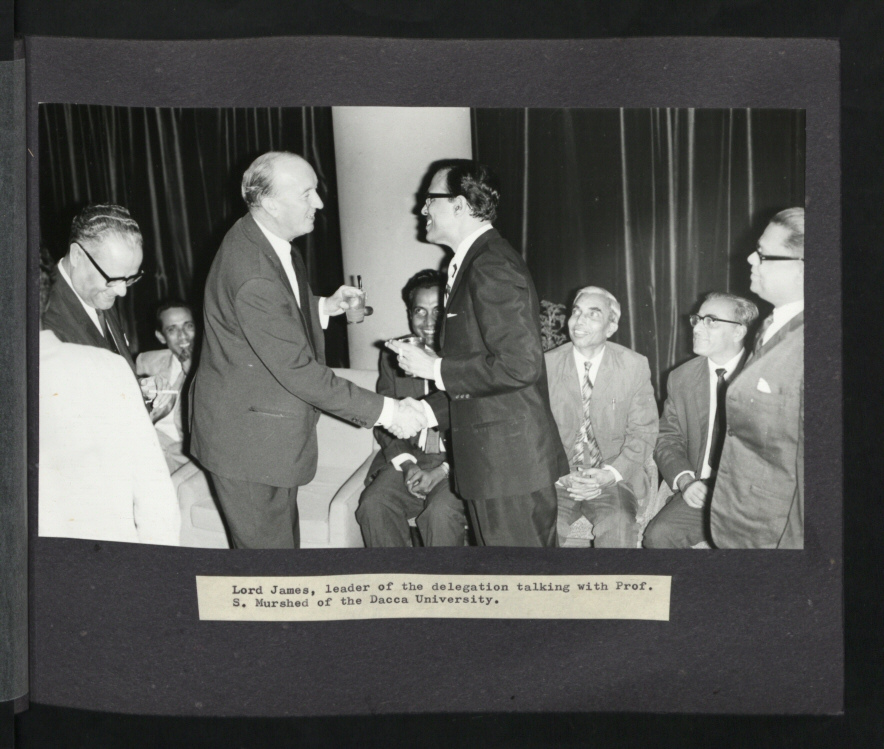
Murshid meeting British delegates at the University of Dhaka in 1970

== Personal life ==
Sarwar Murshid married Nurjahan Beg, also spelled Noor Jehan, the fourth daughter of Ayub Hussain Beg and Bibi Khatimunnissa, from Lalgola, Murshidabad, on 14 August 1948. Murshid's eldest son, Khan Ahmed Sayeed Murshid, is an economist and is the current director general of the Bangladesh Institute of Development Studies. He is also the executive director of the Shabab Murshid Development Foundation (SMDF). Murshid's daughter Tazeen Mahnaz Murshid was a professor of history at BRAC University. She has set up the Mrs Noor Jehan and Prof Khan Sarwar Murshid Trust Fund with the Asiatic Society of Bangladesh. The inaugural lecture by eminent jurist Kamal Hossain focused on Dhaka University and its role in shaping Bangladesh society, and was delivered on Tuesday, 20 December 2016. Sharmeen Murshid runs a prominent development NGO called Brotee, and Khan Ahmad Nuwayid Murshid has joined BRAC University administration. Now Sharmeen Murshid is a member of the advisory council of the Bangladesh interim government.

== Death ==
Murshid died on 8 December 2012 from a heart attack after a massive stroke on 29 November. He was given the guard of honor at Central Shaheed Minar for his contribution to the liberation war of Bangladesh as a freedom-fighter and buried at the Mirpur Martyred Intellectuals' Graveyard.
