= Rajib Humayun =

Bangladeshi linguist (1951–2017)

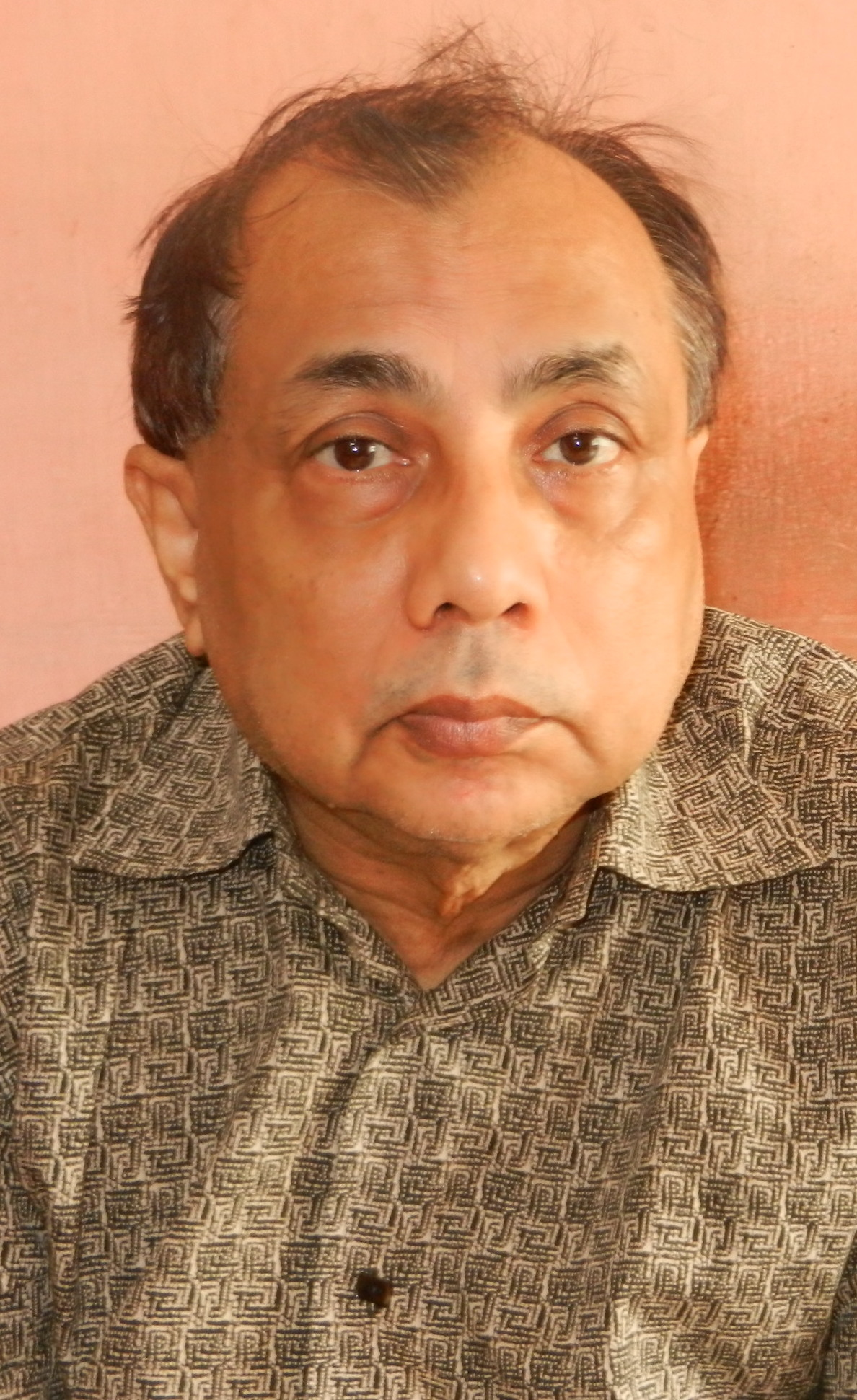
- Born: 14 January 1951; Sandwip, Chittagong District, East Bengal, Dominion of Pakistan
- Died: 5 July 2017 (aged 66); Dhaka, Bangladesh
- Education: Rajshahi College; University of Dhaka; University of Pune
- Occupations: Linguist, Nazrul researcher, playwright, educator
- Spouse: Zakia Sultana
- Children: Kaiser Rajib Sherpa, Iftekher Rajib Rupai
- Relatives: Abyad Rajib Sherpa, Ajanta Rajib Sherpa (grandchildren)

Rajib Humayun (born Humayun Kabir; 14 January 1951 – 5 July 2017) was a Bangladeshi linguist, Nazrul researcher, playwright, and educator. He was a prominent figure in Bengali linguistics and a leading researcher on the works of Kazi Nazrul Islam.

== Early life and education ==
Humayun was born in Sandwip, Chittagong District, East Pakistan (present-day Bangladesh). His parents were Maulavi Syed Ahmad, a teacher of Kargil Government High School and Azmatunnesa Begum.

During the Bangladesh Liberation War in 1971, his younger brother, Jasim Uddin Ahmad, a member of the Mukti Bahini, was captured, tortured, and executed allegedly by Mir Quasem Ali. In later years, Humayun testified against Quasem Ali during his trial for war crimes.

Humayun completed his secondary education in 1966 from South Sandwip High School before attending Rajshahi College, where he passed his Higher Secondary Certificate examination in 1968, ranking fifth in the Rajshahi Board. He subsequently earned his Bachelor's and Master's degrees in Bengali language and literature from the University of Dhaka. In 1978, he was awarded a PhD in Linguistics from the University of Pune, India, for his doctoral thesis, The Descriptive Analysis of Sandvipi in Its Socio-Cultural Context.

== Career ==
Following the completion of his doctoral studies, Humayun began his academic career at the University of Chittagong as an assistant professor in 1977. He subsequently taught at Jahangirnagar University before joining the University of Dhaka as an associate professor in the Bangla Department in 1986. In 1992, he became the founding chairperson of the Department of Linguistics at the University of Dhaka, where he played a central role in establishing the discipline as an independent academic field. He served in this position until his retirement in 2004. After retirement, he continued his academic engagement as a faculty member at North South University.

Humayun authored a number of notable works, including Nazrul and World Culture, Nazrul Islam and Bangladeshi Literature, Nazrul's Writing Techniques, and Abul Mansur Ahmad's Satire and Cultural Thought. His scholarly contributions also extended to sociolinguistics, as well as studies on the history, society, and culture of Sandwip. In 2015, he received recognition for his research on Abul Mansur Ahmad.

Alongside his academic pursuits, Humayun was actively involved in cultural activities as a playwright and appeared in numerous Bangladesh Television programmes. He also served as president of the Chittagong chapter of Bangladesh Udichi Shilpigoshthi.

== Works ==
=== Plays ===
- নীলপানিয়া, ১৯৮৬
- মহাপ্রস্থান, ১৯৮৪
- লাগুকদোলা, ১৯৮৪
- একটি পরিবারের গল্প, ১৯৯২
- ব্রিফকেস, ১৯৯৩
- দিলাল রাজা, ১৯৮১
- মাগো তুমি কেমন আছো, ১৯৯৯

=== Linguistics ===
- Sociolinguistic and descriptive study of Sandvipi, a Bangla dialect, 1985
- সমাজভাষাবিজ্ঞান, ১৯৯৪
- পুরোনো ঢাকার ভাষা, ২০১০

=== Kazi Nazrul Islam ===
- নজরুলের লেখার গল্প শেখার গল্প, ২০০১
- নজরুল ও বিশ্বসংস্কৃতি, ২০০৪
- নজরুল ইসলাম ও বাংলাদেশের সাহিত্য, ১৯৯৮

=== Others ===
- আবুল মনসুর আহমদের ব্যঙ্গ রচনা (1985)
- সন্দ্বীপের ইতিহাস, সমাজ ও সংস্কৃতি (1987)
- নাটক লেখার কলাকৌশল (1990)
- নীলপানিয়া (1992)
- Bangla Academy English–Bengali Dictionary (1993) — one of the editors and compilers
- তিতাস একটি নদীর নাম (সরলীকরণ) (1996)
- নাটকের ক্লাস (2004)
- আমাদের এক বিশ্ব ছিল (2004)
- ঐতিহ্যবাহী হিন্দি গান ও সাহিত্য সংস্কৃতি (2004)
- স্থানান্তরিত সন্দ্বীপবাসী ও অন্যান্য (2012)

=== Television Program ===
- বাঁধনহারা, গ্রন্থনা এবং উপস্থাপনা, ১৯৯৬-২০০১
- ভালোবাসো মোর গান, গ্রন্থনা এবং উপস্থাপনা, ২০০৮-২০১০

== Death and legacy ==
Humayun died on 5 July 2017 at Apollo Hospital in Dhaka due to complications from kidney disease, aged 67. After his death, a commemorative book titled 'Rajib Humayun Kriti o Smrity'/'রাজীব হুমায়ুন কৃতি ও স্মৃতি' was published.
