= Abdul Kaium =

Bangladeshi police officer

Inspector General of Bangladesh Police
- In office 7 May 2005 – 6 July 2006
- Preceded by: Mohammad Hadis Uddin
- Succeeded by: Anwarul Iqbal

Personal details
- Born: 1948 (age 77–78) Baksiganj, Jamalpur, East Bengal, Dominion of Pakistan
- Education: University of Dhaka (BA, MA)
- Police career
- Allegiance: Bangladesh
- Branch: Bangladesh Police
- Service years: 1973-2006
- Status: Retired
- Rank: IGP

Abdul Kaium (also spelled Quayum; born 1948) is a Bangladeshi police officer who served as the inspector general of police of Bangladesh Police during 2005–2006.

== Biography ==
Kaium was born in Pakhimara village in what is now Baksiganj Upazila of Jamalpur District, He earned his bachelor's and master's in economics from the University of Dhaka in 1968 and 1969 respectively. He was trained at Bramsil Staff College in England.

Kaium served as the chief of Special Branch (SB).

On 7 July 2005, Kaium became the inspector general of police of Bangladesh Police, first with a cadre service background.
