= M Niaz Asadullah =

- নিয়াজ আসাদুল্লাহ

Academic background
- Education: Aligarh Muslim University, Dhaka University, Oxford University

Academic work
- Discipline: Economist, Educationist
- Sub-discipline: Economics of Education, Economics of Gender, Development Studies
- Institutions: University of Reading, Chulalongkorn University, University of Dhaka

M Niaz Asadullah is a Bangladeshi economist and educationist, scholar and academic. He is currently a visiting professor of economics at the University of Reading, adjunct professor at College of Population Studies in Chulalongkorn University, Thailand, a Senior Fellow at the Institute of Democracy and Economic Affairs (IDEAS), Malaysia and a professor at University of Dhaka. His active institutional affiliations include roles such as a research fellow at the IZA Institute of Labor Economics and Southeast Asia cluster lead of Global Labor Organization. His research spans economics, comparative education, international development and public policy.

== Education ==
Asadullah was born in 1975 in Dhaka, Bangladesh. He earned his BA (Hons) in economics from Aligarh Muslim University, graduating first in his class and receiving the Muzzamil Towle Gold Medal. He completed an MA in economics at Dhaka University in 1997, followed by a second master's degree in economics at Oxford University in 1999 as a Rhodes Scholar and a DPhil in economics in 2005.

== Career ==
He began his academic career in 1999 as a lecturer at the Department of Economics, University of Dhaka. He later joined the Department of Economics at the University of Reading, UK, as a lecturer (2006–2013). In 2014, he moved to Malaysia, serving first as a professor and deputy director of the Centre for Poverty and Development Studies at the University of Malaya (2014–2022) and then at Monash University Malaysia. Over the years, he has held visiting appointments at Harvard, Oxford, Manchester, and Mindanao State Universities, well as the National Child Development Research Centre, UPSI, and Bangladesh Institute of Development Studies.

His notable past policy appointments include serving as advisor to the minister for agriculture and food industries and as a member of the National Agricultural Advisory Council (MPPN), Government of Malaysia (2020–2022). More recently, he has been appointed head of the taskforce responsible for publishing a white paper on Bangladesh's ICT sector. He will also serve as a member of the national taskforce investigating corruption in the country's telecommunications sector, particularly potential corruption in the use of the social obligation funds (SOF).

== Research ==
His research focuses on poverty, education, labor market, skills formation and gender issues with a focus on South/East Asia countries. Social Well-being Research Centre (SWRC)) and HIR schemes of the University of Malaya as well as international grants such as the Australian Development Research Award Scheme, Leverhulme Trust (UK), International Growth Centre (IGC), the DFID (UK), Organization of Islamic Cooperation (OIC), South Asian Network of Economic Research Institutes, Global Education Commission, and the World Bank. He has also consulted for Asian Productivity Organization (APO), BRAC, Oxford Policy Management, BAPPENAS (Government of Indonesia), UN-ESCAP, UNESCO, the World Bank and the World Health Organization (WHO).

Among his prominent policy contributions are the first global assessment of education quality across the 57 member states of the Organization of Islamic Cooperation (OIC) and background papers for the UNESCO Global Monitoring Report 2022. His research on Bangladesh's development progress, especially in comparison to India and Pakistan, has highlighted early advancements in areas such as female education, child health, and fertility rates before the GDP growth boom of the 2010s. In other research, he addresses Bangladesh's "double paradox": sustained economic growth and export expansion despite governance challenges and corruption. His research cautioned that the Bangladesh model of growth will not be sustainable unless governance and democracy deficits are addressed.

He has also conducted pioneering studies on the rise of Islamic schools in Bangladesh. He led the first comprehensive survey on Islamic schools in Bangladesh, published by the World Bank as Secondary School Madrasa Education in Bangladesh (QSSMEB)" coauthored with World Bank researchers Syed Rashed Al-Zayed Josh and Nazmul Chaudhury, supported by a Leverhulme Trust fellowship, he further explored various aspects of madrasa education, as such the association between madrasa attendance and student's cognitive achievement, girls' schooling, social trust, gender and civic attitudes. Other strand of this scholarship focused on reasons for the demand of madrasa schooling and the interaction between madrasa and non-faith education system.

He is ranked among the top 5% of economists on IDEAS/RePEc.

== Selected publication ==
1. Edwards Jr, D. Brent; Asadullah, M. Niaz; Webb, Amber (2024). "Critical perspectives at the mid-point of Sustainable Development Goal 4: Quality education for all—progress, persistent gaps, problematic paradigms, and the path to 2030". International Journal of Educational Development. 107 103031. doi:10.1016/j.ijedudev.2024.103031.
2. Asadullah, M.Niaz; Bouhlila, Donia Smaali; Chan, Sheng-Ju; Draxler, Alexandra; Ha, Wei; Heyneman, Stephen P.; Luschei, Thomas F.; Semela, Tesfaye; Yemini, Miri (2023). "A year of missed opportunity: Post-Covid learning loss – A renewed call to action". International Journal of Educational Development. 99 102770. doi:10.1016/j.ijedudev.2023.102770. PMC 10036080. PMID 36987508.
3. Asadullah, M. Niaz; Joseph, Jeron; Chin, James (2023). "The Political Economy of Poverty Reduction in Malaysia". Progress in Development Studies. 23 (2): 127–151. doi:10.1177/14649934231151486. ISSN 1464-9934.
4. Amirapu, Amrit; Asadullah, M. Niaz; Wahhaj, Zaki (2022). "Social barriers to female migration: Theory and evidence from Bangladesh". Journal of Development Economics. 158 102891. doi:10.1016/j.jdeveco.2022.102891.
5. Asadullah, M. Niaz; De Cao, Elisabetta; Khatoon, Fathema Zhura; Siddique, Zahra (2021). "Measuring gender attitudes using list experiments". Journal of Population Economics. 34 (2): 367–400. doi:10.1007/s00148-020-00805-2. hdl:11585/886804. ISSN 0933-1433.
6. Asadullah, M. Niaz; Mansoor, Nazia; Randazzo, Teresa; Wahhaj, Zaki (2021). "Is son preference disappearing from Bangladesh?". World Development. 140 105353. doi:10.1016/j.worlddev.2020.105353.
7. Asadullah, M. Niaz; Perera, Liyanage Devangi H.; Xiao, Saizi (2020). "Vietnam's extraordinary performance in the PISA assessment: A cultural explanation of an education paradox". Journal of Policy Modeling. 42 (5): 913–932. doi:10.1016/j.jpolmod.2020.02.007.
8. Asadullah, M. Niaz; Wahhaj, Zaki (2019). "Early Marriage, Social Networks and the Transmission of Norms". Economica. 86 (344): 801–831. doi:10.1111/ecca.12291. hdl:10419/129979. ISSN 0013-0427.
9. Asadullah, M. Niaz; Savoia, Antonio (2018). "Poverty reduction during 1990–2013: Did millennium development goals adoption and state capacity matter?". World Development. 105: 70–82. doi:10.1016/j.worlddev.2017.12.010.
10. Asadullah, Mohammad Niaz; Chaudhury, Nazmul (2012). "Subjective well-being and relative poverty in rural Bangladesh". Journal of Economic Psychology. 33 (5): 940–950. doi:10.1016/j.joep.2012.05.003. hdl:10419/58460.
11. Khalid, Ahmed M.; Ferguson, R. James; Asadullah, M. Niaz, eds. (2023). Economic Integration Among D-8 Muslim Countries: Prospects And Challenges (1st ed.). World Scientific. ISBN 978-981-12-4782-8.
12. Islam, Kazi Md. Mukitul; Asadullah, M. Niaz (2018). García-Gallego, Aurora (ed.). "Gender stereotypes and education: A comparative content analysis of Malaysian, Indonesian, Pakistani and Bangladeshi school textbooks". PLOS ONE. 13 (1) e0190807. Bibcode:2018PLoSO..1390807I. doi:10.1371/journal.pone.0190807. ISSN 1932-6203. PMC 5774688. PMID 29351305.

== Editorship ==
Among his other academic responsibilities, Niaz Asadullah is an associate editor of several journals: Singapore Economic Review (World Scientific), Journal of Human Development and Capabilities (Taylor & Francis), PLOS One, International Journal of Educational Development (Elsevier) & Asia Pacific Education Review (Springer) and Co-Editor of the Handbook of Labor, Human Resources and Population Economics (Springer Nature). He is also on the editorial advisory board of Journal of Poverty and Public Policy (Willey), Journal of Public Affairs (Willey), COMPARE: A Journal of Comparative and International Education (Taylor & Francis), Journal of Demography (Thailand) and Malaysian Journal of Economics.
