= Khan Ahmed Sayeed Murshid =

Bangladeshi researcher

Khan Ahmed Sayeed Murshid, also known as Dr KAS Murshid, is a Bangladeshi researcher and former director general of the Bangladesh Institute of Development Studies. He is a director of Prime Bank.

== Early life ==
Murshid was born in 1951 to Bengali family of Khans from the village of Nasirabad in Nabinagar, Comilla district. He was a son of Khan Sarwar Murshid and Nurjahan Murshid. His father Ali Ahmed Khan was a member of the planning commission of Mujibnagar government and confidante of Tajuddin Ahmed and his mother was a member of parliament. He studied economics at the University of Dhaka. He got his PhD from the Faculty of Politics and Economics at the University of Cambridge in 1985. His PhD thesis was on food policy.

== Career ==
In the late 1970s, Murshid joined Bangladesh Institute of Development Studies as a researcher.

In 2010, Murshid edited Challenges in Boosting International Migration from Bangladesh which was written by Kazi Iqbal and Mohammad Yunus and published by the Bangladesh Institute of Development Studies.

Murshid retired in 2012 from Bangladesh Institute of Development Studies. He has worked at Asian Development Bank based in Cambodia and United Nations Development Programme.

Murshid was appointed the director general of the Bangladesh Institute of Development Studies on 9 April 2015. He co-wrote a book with Muhammad Yunus called Rice prices and growth, and poverty reduction in Bangladesh and published in 2018 by the Food and Agriculture Organization.

Dr Binayak Sen replaced Murshid on 1 April 2021 as the director general of the Bangladesh Institute of Development Studies. Under Murshid the institute had climbed to 94 on the 2020 Global Go To Think Tank Index of the University of Pennsylvania. He edited two books, Securing Food For All in Bangladesh and Agricultural Transformation and Rural Poverty in Bangladesh: Essays in Memory of Dr. Mahabub Hossain, which were published by The University Press Limited in 2021.

Murshid wrote The Odds Revisited: Political Economy of the Development of Bangladesh published by the Cambridge University Press in 2022. In 2024, he described the national budget of Bangladesh as a fictitious budget.

== Personal life ==
Murshid is married to singer Shameem Subrana. His son, Shabab Murshid, died at the age of 15 while studying at the International School of Phnom Penh and he founded the Shabab Murshid Foundation in his memory. His elder sister is Tazeen Mahnaz Murshid, senior lecturer of King's College London. His other sister Sharmeen Murshid is a member of the advisory council of the Bangladesh interim government. His brother Kumar Murshid is a politician in the United Kingdom who was a member of the Labour Party.
