= Mohammad Shahjahan (CEO) =

Former managing director and CEO of Grameen Bank

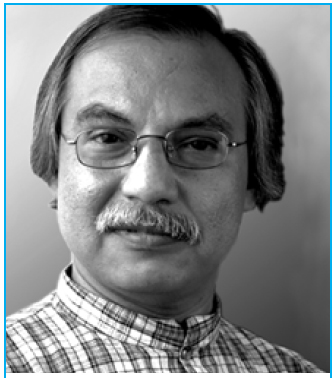
- Education: University of Dhaka
- Employer: Grameen Bank

Mohammad Shahjahan Bangladeshi is a former managing director and CEO of Grameen Bank. He assumed the office on 14 August 2011 until he retired on 30 October 2014. He gained his Bachelor of Commerce degree in accounting from University of Dhaka in 1976. He completed his master's degree in accounting and finance from the same university in 1978 and 1981 respectively. He started his career with Grameen Bank in 1984.

He has been ranked 5th among the top 10 greatest CEOs of the world by Askmen.com.
