= Policy Research Institute, Bangladesh =

Think tank in Dhaka

Policy Research Institute
- Abbreviation: PRI
- Formation: 2009
- Type: Research Institution
- Headquarters: Dhaka, Bangladesh
- Official language: Bengali
- Website: www.pri-bd.org

Policy Research Institute is a think tank based in Banani, Dhaka, that conducts policy-based economics research.

== History ==
Policy Research Institute was established in 2009. Sadiq Ahmed was one of the cofounders of Policy Research Institute.

In September 2019, the Policy Research Institute received US$375,598 funding from the Bill & Melinda Gates Foundation for a 23-month research into digital financial inclusion.

In the 2020 Global Go To Think Tank Index Policy Research Institute was ranked 93 on the South and Southeast Asia and the Pacific subcategory.

Senior economist at the Policy Research Institute Ashikur Rahman Shanto, also an Awami League politician, credited Sheikh Hasina for maintaining a neutral foreign policy for Bangladesh in June 2023.

In May 2024, Policy Research Institute published a study paper called Bangladesh's Domestic Resource Mobilisation: Imperatives and a Roadmap which called for reforms in Bangladesh to increase revenue.

Ahsan H Mansur, an executive director of Policy Research Institute, was appointed governor of Bangladesh Bank after the resignation of Prime Minister Sheikh Hasina in August 2024.

== Fellows ==
Distinguished fellows of the Policy Research Institute are Haider Khan, M. G. Quibria, Md. Rizwanul Islam, Lutfey Siddiqi, Salim Rashid, and Siddiqur Osmani. Senior fellows are Abdullah A. Dewan, Bashiruddin Ahmed, Badruzzaman Ahmed, Binayak Sen, Biru Paksha Paul, Garry Pursell, Hasan Moinuddin, Mafizur Rahman, Mohammad Tamim, M. Amanullah (Chanchal) Khan, M. Rokonuzzaman, Mostafa Abid Khan, Muhammad Mahmood, Ramendra Basak, and Shamsuddin Tareq.

== Board of directors ==
- Zaidi Sattar (chairman)
- Sadiq Ahmed (vice-chairman)
- Ahsan H. Mansur
- Khurshid Alam
- Mohammad Abdur Razzaque
- Yussuf Abdullah Harun
- Zakir Ahmed Khan
- Sarwar Jahan
- Bazlul Haque Khondker
- Ahmad Ahsan

== Advisory panel ==
- Gustav F. Papanek
- Wahidul Haq
- Wahiduddin Mahmud
- Shanta Devarajan
- A. B. Mirza Azizul Islam
- Ishrat Husain
- Mieko Nishimizu
- William Milam
- Abdel Shakour Shaalan
