= Mohammad Tareque =

Mohammad Tareque is a former senior secretary of the Ministry of Finance and former Alternate Director of the World Bank. He is the director of the Bangladesh Institute of Governance and Management.

== Early life ==
Tareque was born in Bagerhat District. His brothers were poet Mohammad Rafiq and Professor Mohammad Naser of the University of Rajshahi. He did his bachelor's degree and masters at the University of Dhaka. He did another masters in political economy and his PhD at Boston University.

== Career ==
Tareque worked as an Micro-economic Analysis Specialist at the Asian Development Bank. He was the director of the Prime Minister's Office for five years.

On 22 January 2007, Tareque was appointed the Finance Secretary of Bangladesh replacing Siddiqur Rahman Chowdhury. In 2008, he discussed offloading shares of three government entities, Bangladesh Road Transport Corporation, Bangladesh Railway, and Jamuna Bridge. He had served under Chief Advisor Fakhruddin Ahmed. He oversaw the spending of confiscated money from corruption suspects for the 100 Days Employment Generation programme. He called for improvements in accounting in public sector to reduce wastage. He oversaw probes against Grameen Bank, founded by Muhammad Yunus. He served as the Finance Secretary till 31 July 2012 and was replaced by Fazle Kabir.

Tareque is an independent director of Mutual Trust Bank. He is the director of the Bangladesh Institute of Governance and Management. Following the fall of the Sheikh Hasina led Awami League government, he called for contraction of monetary and fiscal policies to reduce inflation. He was included in the Public Administration Reform Commission.
