= Abdul Hai Sarker =

Bangladeshi businessman (born 1946)

- আব্দুল হাই সরকার
- Born: 15 December 1946 (age 79); Sirajganj, East Pakistan, Presently Bangladesh.
- Education: Master of Management from University of Dhaka
- Occupation: Entrepreneur
- Organization: Purbani Group
- Title: Chairman & CEO

Abdul Hai Sarker (Bengali: আব্দুল হাই সরকার) is a Bangladeshi businessman. He is the Chairman and CEO of Purbani Group, one of the largest and oldest established textile conglomerates in Bangladesh, and former president of Bangladesh Textile Mills Association. He is the founding chairman of Dhaka Bank Limited. He is a chairman of the trustee board of Independent University, Bangladesh. He is a member of the executive committee of the Bangladesh Association of Banks.

== Early life ==
Sarker was born on 15 December 1946 in Sirajganj District, East Bengal, British India. He finished his master's degree in management from the University of Dhaka in the year 1970, and after completing his study he established his own business named Purbani Traders and involved himself with international trade and business since 1973.

== Career ==
Sarker as a leader of Bangladesh Textile Mills Association hosted a delegation of Pakistan textile mill owners in Bangladesh in November 2005.

Sarker was a fellow member of Liverpool-based International Cotton Association (ICA), an international accredited body of cotton in the world of which he was the associate director for consecutive 6 (six) years.

Sarker opened Dhaka Bank Victory Day hockey on 31 December 2007. On 30 April 2008, Sarker was elected director of the Board of Trustee of Dhaka Bank.

Sarker was president of Bangladesh Textile Mills Association (BTMA), a national trade body of yarn and fabrics manufactures for successive 2 (two) terms in 2007 to 2010. He was re-elected in 2009, uncontested, president of Bangladesh Textile Mills Association. He met Abul Maal Abdul Muhith the Finance Minister of Bangladesh to discuss issues faced by the textile industry. In addition, he was the director of the Federation Bangladesh Chambers of Commerce & Industries (FBCCI).

Sarker is chairman of the board of trustees of the Independent University, Bangladesh of both Dhaka and Chittagong. Sarker also has been recently elected as the member of the International Chamber of Commerce (ICC), Bangladesh. On 1 January 2010, he was recognized by the government of Bangladesh as a Commercially Import Person (CIP) which granted them a number of privileges' from the government.

On 5 May 2014, Sarker was re-elected chairman of Dhaka Bank. He had served as vice-chairman of Bangladesh Association of Banks. He had served as the chairperson of Karim Spinning Mills Limited. He is a member of International Chamber of Commerce-Bangladesh. He is a founding trustee board member and member of the board of governors of Bangladesh Enterprise Institute. He is the managing director of Karim Textile Limited, Purbani Fabrics Limited, and Shohagpur Textiles Mills.

Sarker is the chairperson of Education, Science, Technology and Cultural Development (ESTCDT) Trust at Independent University, Bangladesh from 2017 to 2018, where is he a founding trustee.

Sarker is also one of the founders of Dhaka Bank Limited being hold the position of founder chairman and also current chairman, appointed on 14 August 2020. 7 December 2021, Sarker was appointed chairperson of the Trustee Board of the Independent University, Bangladesh. He was re-elected chairman of Dhaka Bank on 12 July 2021 and again in July 2024 for another two-year term.

On 9 September 2024, he was elected Chairman of the Bangladesh Association of Banks (BAB), succeeding Nazrul Islam Mazumder who had held the post for 17 years. Mr. Sarker was later elected as the president of Bangladesh Tennis Federation on 20 Nov 2024.

In November 2025 Abdul Hai Sarker was re-elected as Dhaka Bank chairman for next two years. He emphasized the importance of Bangladesh Bank's independence while calling for accountability. He argued that bureaucratic control over the central bank has hindered its efficiency and delayed economic decisions, negatively affecting the financial system. Sarker welcomed the draft of the Bangladesh Bank Ordinance 2025 aimed at enhancing the bank's autonomy, but cautioned that reforms must be implemented thoughtfully to avoid creating new risks for businesses and the economy.
