= Nurun Nahar =

Former Acting Governor of Bangladesh Bank (born 1965)

- নুরুন নাহার

Governor of Bangladesh Bank (acting)
- In office 11 August 2024 – 13 August 2024
- Preceded by: Abdur Rouf Talukder
- Succeeded by: Ahsan H. Mansur

Personal details
- Born: 1965 (age 60–61) Kishoreganj
- Education: University of Dhaka; Asian University of Bangladesh

Nurun Nahar is a banker. She was the acting governor of Bangladesh Bank since Abdur Rouf Talukder resigned from the position. She is replaced by Ahsan H. Mansur. Before that she was the deputy governor of the bank.

== Early life ==
Nurun Nahar was born in 1965 in Dhamrai, Dhaka. She obtained her BSc degree from the University of Dhaka in 1984 and MBA degree from the Asian University of Bangladesh in 2001. she completed a Banking Diploma from the Institute of Bankers Bangladesh.

== Career ==
Nahar joined Bangladesh Bank as assistant director in 1989. She was promoted to executive director in 2019.

On July 2, 2023, Nahar was promoted to Deputy Governor of Bangladesh Bank. Before being appointed as Deputy Governor, she was Senior Executive Director, Banking Regulations and Policy Department, Credit Guarantee Department and Security Management Department of Bangladesh Bank.

Nahar has served as a Visiting Lecturer at the training institutes of Private Commercial Banks and an Examiner at the Institute of Bankers, Bangladesh. Apart from these, she is a faculty member of Bangladesh Bank Training Academy.

On 11 August 2024 Nahar was appointed as the Governor of Bangladesh Bank.
