= A. N. M. Hamidullah =

Governor of Bangladesh Bank from 1972 to 1974 (1919–1994)

- এ. এন. এম হামিদুল্লাহ

1st Governor of Bangladesh Bank
- In office 18 January 1972 – 18 November 1974
- President: Abu Sayeed Chowdhury Mohammad Mohammadullah
- Preceded by: Position established
- Succeeded by: A. K. N. Ahmed

A. N. M. Hamidullah (1919–1994) was the first governor of Bangladesh Bank, the central bank of Bangladesh. He served during 1972–1974.

Hamidullah's wife was killed in 1971 in an attack by the Pakistani Army.

== Early life ==
In 1919, he was born in the village of Somospur, in Srinagar upazila of Munshiganj (former Bikrampur) district. In 1971, Hamidullah was the managing director of Eastern Banking Corporation. His entire family was killed by the Pakistani Army when they were attempting to leave Dacca by country boat during no-curfew hours. Hamidullah, who was not with them, was reportedly in a state of shock.

== Career ==
He was a Fellow of the Washington-based International Bankers Association. He took advanced training in banking through Bangladesh Barclays Bank in London. In 1963 and 1967, he attended seminars on financing of industry held in Tokyo, Japan, as the representative of Bangladesh. He attended the annual joint meetings of the IFM in 1972, 1973 and 1974 as the Governor of Bangladesh Bank. He was an alternate member of the Joint Committee of the IFM. He was a member of the Permitting Committee for Establishment of Jute Mills in the Private Sector and the Pakistan Fourth Panchshala Plan Review Committee during his time at IDP.

In 1965 he got the post of managing director of Eastern Banking Corporation. The scheduled commercial bank he founded established 62 branches in Pakistan. He served the bank until December 1971.

Later, Uttara Bank was established by Eastern Bank Corporation and Muslim Commercial Bank in the post-independence era. Later, Uttara Bank was established by Eastern Bank Corporation and Muslim Commercial Bank in the post-independence era.

He was appointed as the first Governor of Bangladesh Bank in 1972 after the independence of the country. He played an important role in organizing a central bank for the newly independent country. During this time, he dealt with issues such as note printing, the currency system, and the regulation of the credit system. He remained in the post of governor until March 1975.

He served as ambassador to Kenya and Zambia in Africa from 1978 to 1982.

Returning to Bangladesh in 1982, he was first made executive president and managing director of United Commercial Bank, then City Bank Limited in 1984, and Al Baraka Bank in 1989.

== Death ==
A. N. Hamid Ullah died in Canada in 1994.
