= Atiur Rahman =

Bangladeshi economist (born 1951)

- আতিউর রহমান
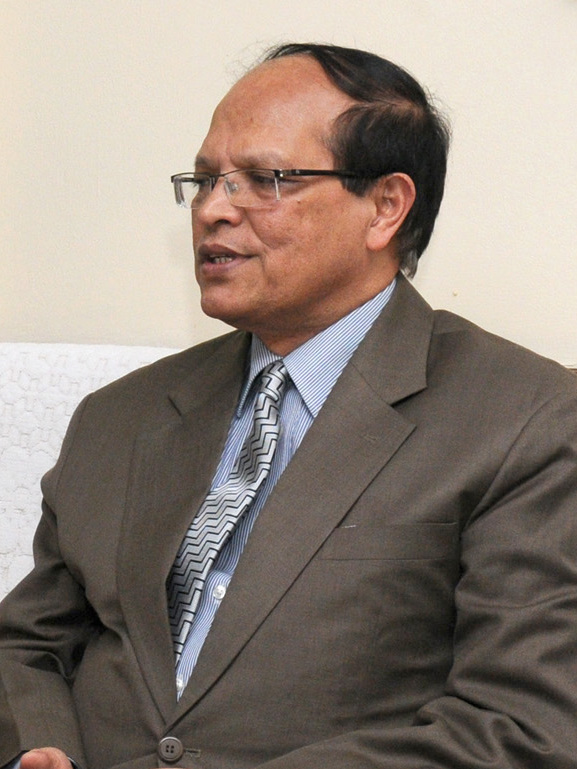
- Atiur Rahman in 2015

10th Governor of Bangladesh Bank
- In office 1 May 2009 – 15 March 2016
- President: Zillur Rahman; Mohammad Abdul Hamid
- Prime Minister: Sheikh Hasina
- Preceded by: Salahuddin Ahmed
- Succeeded by: Fazle Kabir

Personal details
- Born: 3 August 1951 (age 75) Jamalpur, East Bengal, Pakistan
- Spouse: Shahana Rahman
- Education: University of Dhaka; SOAS, University of London
- Profession: Economist
- Awards: World No Tobacco Day Award (2012); Bangla Academy Literary Award (2016)

Atiur Rahman (Bengali: আতিউর রহমান; born 3 August 1951) is a Bangladeshi development economist, author, and banker. He served as the 10th Governor of Bangladesh Bank, the central bank of Bangladesh. He has been called "the banker of the poor" for his contributions in developing the Bangladeshi economy. Atiur Rahman is credited with instituting changes in the banking industry that greatly increased the country's foreign exchange reserves and brought automation and digitization in the banking sector. On 15 March 2016, he resigned as central bank governor after the cyber hacking and theft of US$101 million in foreign reserves from the Bangladesh Bank account held at the Federal Reserve Bank of New York.

== Early life ==
Atiur Rahman was born in a village in Jamalpur district on 13 December 1951. His father, who was a landless farmer, had received no schooling. Atiur Rahman went to school, but had to quit after third grade due to their financial situation.

He was able to resume his education shortly after, taking the final examination for sixth grade. Eventually, he was admitted to Mirzapur Cadet College in seventh grade. A teacher, Foyez Moulavi, collected charity funds to facilitate his admission. Considering his financial inability, the college authority granted him free tuition. Thus he could continue at the college, where he passed the SSC and HSC examinations, securing positions in the merit list both times.

He earned BSS and MSS degrees in economics from the University of Dhaka. With a Commonwealth scholarship, he went to SOAS, University of London to complete his Ph.D. in 1977. His thesis later came out as a book under the title Peasants and Classes, published by the Oxford University Press.

== Career ==
Atiur Rahman served as a planning officer in the Bangladesh Tourism Corporation in 1975. In 1994, he established a development NGO under the title Unnayan Shamannay. He worked at the Bangladesh Institute of Development Studies in different capacities for nearly 28 years and retired as Senior Research Fellow on 4 April 2006. He served as director of the state-owned Sonali Bank, the largest in Bangladesh.

In 2001, the government appointed him as chairman of the board of directors of the Janata Bank, the second-largest in the country. In 2006, he joined the University of Dhaka in the Department of Development Studies as a professor.

He was involved in the management of a number of socio-cultural organisations including Credit Development Forum, Monajatuddin Smriti Sangsad, Bangladesh Economic Association and Asiatic Society and Bangla Academy. Atiur Rahman focused on poverty alleviation, engaging in first-hand research to find the causes of poverty and means of remedy. He worked specifically with shoal dwellers.

=== Central bank governor ===
On 29 April 2009, Atiur Rahman was appointed as the 10th governor of Bangladesh Bank, the central bank of the country, for a tenure of four years. He assumed the title on 3 May 2009 and was reappointed until July 2016.

As governor, he took steps to develop the economy by instituting programs including women entrepreneur loans, a loan for landless farmers and special programs around green finance. Atiur Rahman worked to bring automation and digitization into the banking sector by creating the National Payment Switch. He introduced automated check clearing for banks in Bangladesh using local currency cheques; starting mobile banking; establishing the Bangladesh Electronic Funds Transfer Network (BEFTN); and instituting the Bangladesh Automated Clearing House (BACH). BEFTN is a system of transferring money from one bank account directly to another bank without paper money changing hands. Bangladesh foreign exchange reserves quadrupled during his tenure. In March 2016, Atiur Rahman resigned from his post following the 2016 Bangladesh Bank heist. Before the resignation was made public, Atiur Rahman stated that he would resign if it would benefit his country. Two days after his resignation, he returned to his position as professor at the Department of Development Studies at the University of Dhaka. He was honored as the 'Bangabandhu Professor' of University of Dhaka.

After his tenure as a governor, he rejoined the Department of Development Studies. The Dhaka University Syndicate appointed him as a 'Bangabandhu Chair' on 1 November 2019. He serves as Chairperson of Unnayan Shamannay.

== Publications ==
Atiur Rahman is a regular newspaper columnist who writes on poverty, public expenditure, economic development, public welfare, and other socio-economic issues. He had published 45 titles as of 2009, of which 16 are in English and 29 in Bengali. He writes books mainly socio-economic issues, for example, his recent publication about Rabindranath Tagore's socio-economic thoughts and research. Partial list:

Bengali language

- Nai Nai Voy, Hobe Hobe Joy, Panjeree, ISBN 978-984-634-297-0
- Tabo Bhovone Tabo Bhovne: Anyaprokash, ISBN 978-984-502-211-8
- Agami Diner Bangladesh: Ekusa sataker Unnayana Bhabana, Pathak Samabes, ISBN 984-8120-39-4
- Alo andharer Bangladesh: Manab Unnayaner Sambhabana O Cyalenja, Mawla Bradarsa, ISBN 984-410-337-1
- Apaunnayan: Samakalin Bangladesher Arthaniti, Samajniti, Pyapirasa, ISBN 984-8065-66-0
- Asahajoger Dinguli: Muktijuddher Prastutiparba, Sahitya Prokash, ISBN 9844651530
- Bangladesher Arek Nam: Bangabandhu Sheikh Mujib, Sahitya Prakash, OCLC 755121227
- Bangladesher Unnayan Kon Pathe, Dipty Prokashony, ISBN 984-806-141-X
- Bhasha Andolan Theke Muktijuddha: Atiur Rahmaner 7 Ti Grantha Pathaker Samikaran, Riddhi Prakash, ISBN 9843102835
- Bhashar Larai Bachar Larai, Nawroz Kitab Maha
- Bangobondhu Sohojpat, Chalochchitra O Prokashona Odhidoptor
- Janaganer Bajet: Amsagrahanamulaka Pariprekshita, Pathaka Samabesa, ISBN 984-8120-28-9
- Nirbachita Prabandha, Anyaprakash, ISBN 9848684239
- Muktijuddher Manush: Muktijuddher Swapna, Sahitya Prakash, ISBN 984465128X
- Susaner Sandhane Anyaprakas, ISBN 984-8682-36-8
- Svapnera Bangladesh, Khunje Phera, Dipti Prakasani, ISBN 984-8061-28-2
- Taba Bhubane Taba Vabane: Rabindranather Arthasamajik Vabana-bisayayak Racanasangkalan, Anyaprakash, ISBN 9789845022118
- Unnayan alap: Arthaniti, Paribesa O Unnayana Bitarka, Pathaka Samabesa, ISBN 984-8120-49-1

English language

- Beel Dakatia: The Environmental Consequences of a Development Disaster, University Press, ISBN 984-05-1258-7 (984-05-1258-7)
- Early Impact of Grameen, a Multi-Dimensional Analysis: Outcome of a BIDS Research Study, Bangladesh Institute of Development Studies and Grameen Trust, ISBN 984-31-1416-7 (984-31-1416-7)
- Education for Development: Lessons from East Asia for Bangladesh Institute of Southeast Asian Studies, ISBN 981-230-132-1 (981-230-132-1)
- Peasants and Classes: A Study in Differentiation in Bangladesh Zed Books, Limited, ISBN 0-86232-346-0 (0-86232-346-0)
- Peasants and Classes: A Study in Differentiation in Bangladesh: Hardcover, Zed Books, Limited, ISBN 0-86232-345-2 (0-86232-345-2)
- People's Report, 2002–2003, Bangladesh Environment by United Nations Development Programme, Bangladesh, Unnayan Shamannay (Organization : Bangladesh) Unnayan Shamannay, ISBN 984-32-0866-8 (984-32-0866-8)
- People's Report, 2004–2005: Bangladesh Environment by United Nations Development Programme, Bangladesh, Unnayan Shamannay (Organization : Bangladesh)
- Sustainable Environment Management Programme (Bangladesh), Unnayan Shamannay, ISBN 984-32-3225-9 (984-32-3225-9)

== Recognition ==
- Central Banker of the Year (2015) from the Asia-Pacific region, in recognition of his achievement in supporting lending to farmers and small and medium-sized enterprises (SMEs) without compromising growth and macroeconomic stability, by the London-based Financial Times owned magazine, The Banker;
- Central Bank Governor (2015), Asia by The Emerging Markets Newspaper (UK based financial newspaper of the Euromoney Group).
- The British Parliament lauded Atiur Rahman for women's empowerment on 8 March 2015.
- GUSI Peace Prize International (2014) for his work in the field of economics focusing on the welfare of poor people.
- World No Tobacco Day Award (2012) by the World Health Organization (WHO).
- Indira Gandhi Gold Plaque (2011)
- Atish Dipankar Gold Medal (2000)
- Chandrabati Gold Medal (2008)
- Nepal's Prime Minister Sushil Koirala expressed his gratitude to Atiur Rahman for extending CSR support towards victims of the earthquake in Nepal on 7 June 2015.
- Dharitri Bangladesh National Award (1421, Bengali) on 30 December 2015
- Bangla Academy Literary Award (2016).
- Bangabandhu Chair of the University of Dhaka (2019).

== Personal life ==
Atiur Rahman married Shahana Rahman, who is a professor of pediatrics at Bangabandhu Sheikh Mujib Medical University and they have three daughters.

== See also ==
- List of Bangladeshi people

Political offices
Preceded by Salahuddin Ahmed	Governor of Bangladesh Bank; 2009–2016	Succeeded by Fazle Kabir
