= Bangladesh Association of Banks =

Industry trade body (AOP) of private banks in Bangladesh

- Formation: 1993
- Headquarters: Dhaka, Bangladesh
- Region served: Bangladesh
- Official language: Bengali
- Website: Bangladesh Association of Banks

Bangladesh Association of Banks (BAB) is an industry trade body of private banks in Bangladesh that represents the interests of the banking industry. Abdul Hai Sarker, Founder Chairman of Dhaka Bank Ltd, is the Chairman of the Bangladesh Association of Banks.

Bangladesh Bank removed Nazrul Islam Majumdar from the post of director and chairman of Exim Bank after the change of government on 5 August 2024. As a result, he lost the chairmanship of BAB. During the Association's meeting held on 9 September 2024, Mr. Abdul Hai Sarker, chairman of the Dhaka Bank Limited was unanimously elected as Chairman of the BAB.

== History ==
Bangladesh Association of Banks was established in 1993 by nine private banks. The founding members were Al Baraka Bank Pakistan, AB Bank, The City Bank, IFIC Bank, National Bank Limited, United Commercial Bank Ltd, and Uttara Bank Limited. The first meeting was held on 12 December 1993 at the Hotel Sheraton (currently the InterContinental Dhaka). By 2018, membership had risen 38 private banks. In 2020, Bangladesh Association of Banks proposed to set up Mujib corners in the headquarters of all private banks of Bangladesh.

== Past presidents ==
Commodore M. A. Rahman (Retd.)	Chairman, Islami Bank Bangladesh Ltd	12-DEC-1993	18-APR-1994
Mr. M. Morshed Khan	Chairman, Arab Bangladesh Bank Ltd	18-APR-1994	17-JUN-1997
Mr. Abdul Awal Minto	Chairman, National Bank Ltd	17-JUN-1997	08-FEB-1999
Mr. Zafar Ahmed Chowdhury	Chairman, United Commercial Bank Ltd	08-FEB-1999	23-JAN-2001
Mr. Kazi Akramuddin Ahmed	Chairman, Standard Bank Ltd	23-JAN-2001	03-JUL-2002
Mr. Syed Manzur Elahi	Founder Chairman, Mutual Trust Bank Ltd	03-JUL-2002	20-JAN-2007
Mr. M. Syeduzzaman	Chairman, Bank Asia Ltd	20-JAN-2007	21-JAN-2008
Mr. Md. Nazrul Islam Mazumder	Chairman, EXIM Bank Ltd	21-JAN-2008	04-AUG-2024
Mr. Abdul Hai Sarker	Founder Chairman, Dhaka Bank PLC	09-SEP-2024	-
