= Taiyabur Rahman Chowdhury =

Taiyabur Rahman Chowdhury MBE (Bengali: রহমান চৌধুরী; 16 August 1943 – 17 November 2016) was a Bangladeshi-born social worker for Bradford Adoption and Fostering Services in Bradford, United Kingdom. He also served as President of the Bangladesh Peoples Association, and was a founding member and Trustee of Tawakulia Jamia Masjid in Bradford.

== Early life ==
Chowdhury was born in the village of Rajapur, Derai, Sunamganj, in what was then East Pakistan. He was the third child, and had two sisters and three brothers. Chowdhury attended MC College in Sylhet. Chowdury emigrated to the UK in 1963

== Social work ==
Chowdhury graduated from the University of Bradford with a degree in social care He then began working with Bradford Adoption and Fostering Services and helped more than 50 couples with adoption. Shortly after retiring, Chowdhury was awarded with an MBE in 2016 for "services to children and families".

== Other ==
Chowdhury also served as president of Bangladesh Peoples Association in Bradford for six years and in 1971 was president of the Bradford Bangladesh Liberation Movement and was an appointed JP in Bradford Magistrates Court.
