= Nahar =

Nahar may refer to:

== People ==
=== Surname ===
- Ali Salim Al-Nahar (born 1992), Omani footballer
- Begum Kamrun Nahar, Bangladeshi civil servant
- Bijoy Singh Nahar (1906–1997), Indian politician
- Devi Das Nahar, Indian Valmiki activist and politician
- Dhanpat Rai Nahar (1919–2009), Indian politician and trade unionist
- Kamrun Nahar, Bangladeshi scientist and environmentalist
- Nurun Nahar (born 1965), Bangladeshi banker
- Robert Masih Nahar (born 1974), Indian-born Spanish politician
- Rukku Nahar (born 1996), British actress
- Shamsun Nahar (born 1957), Bangladeshi politician
- Sujata Nahar (1925–2007), Indian author
- Sultana N. Nahar, Bangladeshi-American astrophysicist
- Tahir Khan Nahar (fl. 16th century), chief of an independent kingdom in Sitpur

=== Given name ===
- Nahar Singh (died 1858), raja of the princely state of Ballabhgarh in Haryana, India
- Nahar Singh of Bharatpur (1672–1697), ruler of Bharatpur state
- Nahar Singh of Shahpura (1855–1932), ruler of Shahpura state
- Nahar Singh of Sikar (died 1756), Rao of Sikar
- Nahar Khan, ruler of Mewat 1372–1402
- Dilshad Nahar Kona (born 1981), Bangladeshi singer
- Faridun Nahar Laily (born 1954), Bangladeshi politician, entrepreneur, and freedom fighter
- Lutfun Nahar Lata, Bangladeshi actress and director
- Nurun Nahar Faizannesa (1932–2004), Bangladeshi feminist and social activist
- Shamshun Nahar Chapa (born 1958), Bangladeshi politician

== Places ==
- Nahr (toponymy), also spelled Nahar, a component of Arabic toponyms literally meaning "river"
- Nahar, East Azerbaijan, a village in East Azerbaijan Province, Iran
- Nahar, Mazandaran, a village in Mazandaran Province, Iran
- Nahar Block of Rewari, a region in India, including a village called Nahar
- Nahar, Semnan, a village in Semnan Province, Iran
- Al Nahar, alternative name for the Palestinian village al-Nahr, depopulated in 1948
- Nahar al-Aaz (Glory River), Iraq

== Media ==
- Al-Nahar, an Egyptian television channel
- An-Nahar, Lebanese newspaper
- Annahar (Kuwait), Kuwaiti newspaper
- Ennahar (Algeria), Algerian newspaper
- Ennahar TV, an Algerian 24-hour television news channel

== Fiction ==
- Lord Nahar, a character in The Echorium Sequence fantasy trilogy by Katherine Roberts

== Others ==
- Judge Nahar, an epithet for Yam (god), Levantine god of the sea and rivers
- Nahar, local name for the Ceylon ironwood Mesua ferrea
- Chechen nahar or naxar, a currency that Chechen separatists planned for the Chechen Republic of Ichkeria

== See also ==
- Aram-Naharaim, region mentioned in the Bible
- Nahr (disambiguation)
- Nahara (disambiguation)
- Nahor (disambiguation)
