= Murari Chand College =

College in Bangladesh

- মুরারিচাঁদ কলেজ
- Logo of Murari Chand College
- Type: Public
- Established: June 27, 1892; 134 years ago
- Founder: Raja Girish Chandra Roy
- Affiliations: Bangladesh National University; Sylhet Education Board
- Principal: Professor Mohammad Tofail Ahmed
- Vice-Principal: Akmal Hossain
- Students: 13,351
- Undergraduates: 10,016
- Postgraduates: 2,735
- Other students: 600 (HSC)
- Location: Tilagor, Ward 20, Sylhet, 3102, Bangladesh; 24.9045°N 91.9008°E
- Campus: 124 acres (50 ha); Urban
- Language: Bengali
- Colors
- Website: mccollege.edu.bd

Murari Chand College (Bengali: মুরারিচাঁদ কলেজ) (usually referred to as MC College) is a public higher education institution located in the Tilaghar area of Sylhet City Corporation, Bangladesh. Founded in 1892 by Raja Girish Chandra Roy, the college is one of the region's oldest educational establishments. It currently offers Higher Secondary education in the Science stream under the Sylhet Education Board, along with undergraduate (Pass), undergraduate (Honours), and postgraduate programs affiliated with the National University. According to BANBEIS, the college currently enrolls 13,351 students.

== History ==
In memory of his maternal grandfather, Murari Chand Roy, Raja Girish Chandra Roy—the Zamindar of Raynagar in Srihatta (present-day Sylhet)—established a high school named Murari Chand Entrance School on 17 June 1886. Within a short time, initiatives were taken to upgrade it into a college. With approval from the University of Calcutta, the F.A. (now equivalent to Higher Secondary) course was introduced in 1891. Continuing this progress, Murari Chand College formally began its journey on 27 June 1892 as the only second-grade college in the Assam Province, starting with just 18 students and 4 teachers. In 1893, the first batch of students from the college appeared for the F.A. examination.

After the devastating earthquake of 1897 destroyed both the Zamindar house and the college building, Raja Girish Chandra Roy rebuilt the college. Despite later facing infrastructural challenges and shortages of teachers, the institution continued to advance. In 1908, the government granted a monthly grant-in-aid of 500 taka, which became an important foundation for the college's sustainability.

=== Government Takeover ===
On 1 April 1912, Sir Archdale Earle, the then Chief Commissioner of Assam, announced that the college would be brought under full government control. At that time, the institution had 98 students and 6 teachers. A separate building for the college was constructed at Govinda Charan Park (now Hasan Market). Through public donations led by Khan Bahadur Syed Abdul Majid (Kaptan Mia), the B.A. (Degree) course was introduced in July 1916, elevating the institution to a first-grade college. In 1917, the first batch of students appeared for the B.A. examination, and in 1918, the first Honours course in Sanskrit was introduced.

On 19 August 1921, the foundation stone of the new campus at Thackare Hill was laid in the presence of Sir William Morris, Governor of Assam, and Education Minister Khan Bahadur Syed Abdul Majid. Around 150 acres of khas land were acquired for the college. On 27 July 1925, Murari Chand College was formally inaugurated on the new campus, and the institution was relocated from Govinda Park to its present site.

=== Academic History ===
The I.Sc. (Intermediate Science) program was introduced in 1913. Between 1918 and 1922, Honours courses were launched in Sanskrit, English, Persian, Arabic, Mathematics, Philosophy, and History. In 1926, the Degree Science program was added, followed by Honours courses in Physics and Chemistry in 1927.

Until the Partition of India in 1947, the college was affiliated with the University of Calcutta. In 1955, under the University of Dhaka, the Honours programs were temporarily discontinued. In 1961, Honours courses were reintroduced in Bangla, English, Political Science, Economics, Mathematics, Physics, and Chemistry. In 1968, the college came under the newly established University of Chittagong, and in 1970, Master's programs were opened but later suspended due to a shortage of teachers. Honours in Botany began in 1972. After the establishment of the National University in 1993, the college was brought under its affiliation.

=== Name Changes and Renaming ===
In 1964, under a policy decision of the Pakistan government's education department, the higher secondary sections of major colleges were separated. As a result, the humanities and commerce streams of the higher secondary level were discontinued at Murari Chand College, although the science stream was retained under special consideration. A separate government higher secondary college began operating on the eastern side of the campus in July 1966. The new institution was named Murari Chand Higher Secondary College, while the original Murari Chand College was renamed Sylhet Government College. The reasoning was that Murari Chand College, founded by Raja Girish Chandra Roy, had originally been a higher secondary institution that was later upgraded to the degree level at government expense.

Later, on 31 December 1989, a Ministry of Education notification restored the institution's traditional name, renaming it Murari Chand College once again. The higher secondary institution, on the other hand, retained the name Sylhet Government College.

== Campus ==
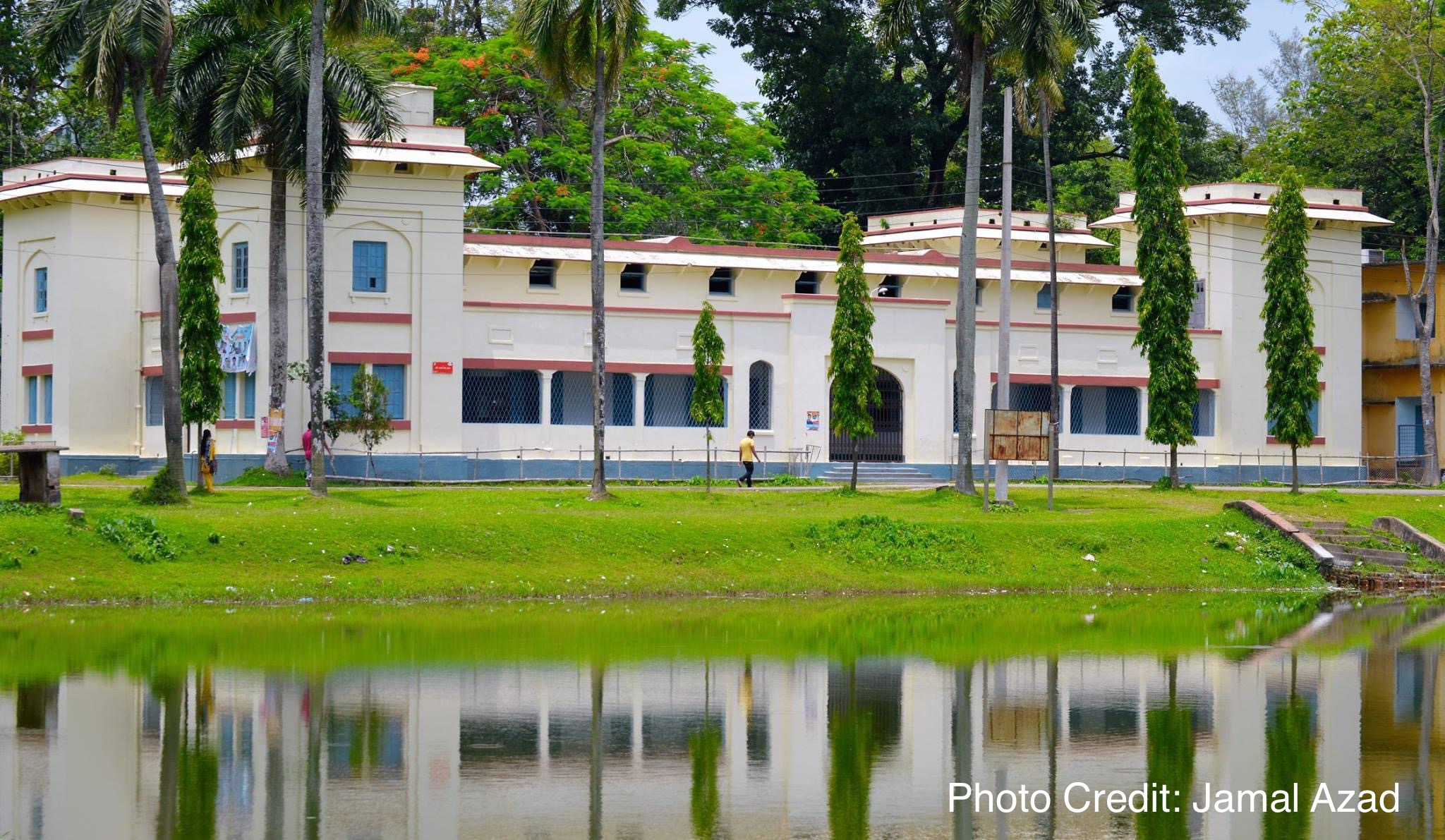
Central library

There are currently nine academic buildings in the college. They consist of classrooms, a library, department offices, etc., and are mainly used to conduct classes. Almost all of the departments have their own academic buildings.

The central library of the college is one of the oldest in the country. It houses a huge number of volumes; many of them are rare. The library is widely used by researchers. It holds more than 60,000 books.

The botanical garden is run by the botany department and is the only of its kind in the Sylhet Division. The Zoology department runs a zoological museum which contains a collection of different animals.

The college has two hostels, one for males and one for females. The male hostel is made up of six blocks, with five blocks for Muslim students and one block for Hindu students. Another four-storey hostel is being built next to the hostel pond.

== Academic departments ==
=== Undergraduate (Honor's) & Masters ===
Faculty	Department	Honor's	Master Final	Master 1st Part
Faculty of Science	Physics	Yes	Yes	Yes
Faculty of Science	Chemistry	Yes	Yes	Yes
Faculty of Science	Mathematics	Yes	Yes	Yes
Faculty of Science	Statistics	Yes	Yes	No
Faculty of Life & Earth Science	Botany	Yes	Yes	Yes
Faculty of Life & Earth Science	Zoology	Yes	Yes	Yes
Faculty of Life & Earth Science	Psychology	Yes	Yes	No
Faculty of Social Science	Sociology	Yes	Yes	Yes
Faculty of Social Science	Economics	Yes	Yes	Yes
Faculty of Social Science	Political Science	Yes	Yes	Yes
Faculty of Arts	Bengali	Yes	Yes	Yes
Faculty of Arts	English	Yes	Yes	Yes
Faculty of Arts	Sanskrit	No	No	Yes
Faculty of Arts	History	Yes	Yes	Yes
Faculty of Arts	Philosophy	Yes	No	Yes
Faculty of Arts	Islamic Studies	No	Yes	Yes
Faculty of Arts	Islamic History and Culture	Yes	Yes	Yes

=== Undergraduate (Pass Course) ===
- B.A. (Pass)
- B.S.S. (Pass)
- B.Sc. (Pass)
- C.C.

=== Higher Secondary ===
- Science

== Extra-curricular ==
The first and old organisations of MC College include Mohona Cultural Organisation. There are 3 rover units and 1 girl in-rover unit run by the Bangladesh Scouts. The Mainamati Battalion of the Bangladesh National Cadet Corps have a platoon here. On 14 November 2017, the Murari Chand Debate Society (MCDS) was established. The MCDS won first place amongst the Sylhet Division in Democracy International's Debate Championship 2018. Other activities include the Murarichand College Science Club, Murarichand College Reporters Unit, Murari Chand Kobita Parishad, Dhrubak Club, Theatre Murarichand, Cultural Organisation, Chemistry Club, Botanical Society and Economics Club.

== Notable alumni ==
- Qazi Kholiquzzaman Ahmad, economist
- Sultan Md. Mansur Ahmed, Bangladeshi politician
- Dewan Mohammad Azraf, poet
- Shegufta Bakht Chaudhuri, governor of Bangladesh Bank (1987–1992) and advisor of the first Caretaker government of Bangladesh
- Moinul Hoque Choudhury, Assam minister
- Enamul Haque Chowdhury, Jatiya Party politician
- Farid Uddin Chowdhury, teacher, businessman and politician
- Shafiqur Rahaman Chowdhury, politician
- Mohammed Forash Uddin, former governor, Bangladesh Bank
- Joy Bhadra Hagjer, former MP of India; former HAD; Veterinary Minister Government of Assam
- Altaf Husain, former editor of the Dawn national English daily newspaper and former industry minister (1965–68).
- Syed Manzoorul Islam, writer
- Mohammad Ataul Karim, Bangladeshi-American scientist; executive vice chancellor and provost of the University of Massachusetts Dartmouth
- Khalil Ullah Khan, Bangladeshi actor
- Mufti Nurunnessa Khatun, botanist, teacher, and horticulturist.
- Shah AMS Kibria, economist and ex-finance minister
- Abdul Malik, cardiologist
- Hafiz Ahmed Mazumder, businessman, politician and educationist
- Habibur Rahman (Tota Mia), member of the first Jatiya Sangsad
- Abul Mal Abdul Muhit, Finance minister of Bangladesh
- Nurul Islam Nahid, Education Minister of Bangladesh
- Saifur Rahman, former finance minister of Bangladesh
- Shafiqur Rahman, physician, politician as Ameer of the Bangladesh Jamaat-e-Islami
- Niharranjan Ray, historian
- Nirmalendu Chowdhury, famous folk singer and lyricist
- Abu Taher, pro-independence fighter and leftist politician
- Prabodh Chandra Sen, Indian rhyme expert, rabindranath scholar and historian
