= Mohammad Nurul Islam =

Bangladeshi economist (1924 - 2007)

3rd Governor of Bangladesh Bank
- In office 13 July 1976 – 12 April 1987
- Preceded by: AKN Ahmed
- Succeeded by: Shegufta Bakht Chaudhuri

Personal details
- Died: 22 December 2007 (aged 83) Dhaka, Bangladesh
- Relatives: Mohammed Matiul Islam (brother)

Mohammad Nurul Islam (c. 1924 – 22 December 2007) was a Bangladeshi economist who served as the third Governor of Bangladesh Bank, country's central bank, from 1976 to 1987.
