= Shegufta Bakht Chaudhuri =

Bangladeshi economist (1931–2020)

- শেগুফতা বখ্‌ত চৌধুরী

4th Governor of Bangladesh Bank
- In office 12 April 1987 – 19 December 1992
- Preceded by: Mohammad Nurul Islam
- Succeeded by: Khorshed Alam

Advisor for industry, commerce, jute and textiles of Caretaker government of Bangladesh
- In office 30 March 1996 – 23 June 1996

Personal details
- Born: 1 September 1931 Habiganj, Bengal Presidency, British India
- Died: 11 November 2020 (aged 89) Dhaka, Bangladesh
- Children: 2
- Parents: Dewan Mamun Chaudhuri (father); Syeda Zebunessa Khatun (mother)
- Relatives: Mahbubur Rob Sadi (brother); Syed Mujtaba Ali (uncle); Syed Murtaza Ali (uncle); Syed Mohammad Ali (cousin); Syed Muazzem Ali (cousin)
- Education: Murari Chand College; University of Dhaka; Harvard Kennedy School

Shegufta Bakht Chaudhuri (known as S B Chaudhuri; 1931 – 11 November 2020) was a Bangladeshi economist who served as the fourth governor of Bangladesh Bank, the central bank of Bangladesh, from 1987 to 1992, and was also the advisor of the first caretaker government of Bangladesh in 1996.

== Early life and education ==
Shegufta Bakht Chaudhuri was born on 1 September 1931 in Bongaon, Nabiganj Thana, Habiganj in the then Bengal Presidency, British India to Dewan Mamun Chaudhuri and Syeda Zebunessa Khatun. Dewan Mamun's father was Khan Bahadur Wasil Chaudhuri. Zebunessa was the daughter of Khan Bahadur Syed Sikandar Ali. Writers Syed Mujtaba Ali and Syed Murtaza Ali were Shegufta's maternal uncles. He traced his maternal descent from Shah Ahmed Mutawakkil, a local holy man and a Syed of Taraf, though unrelated to Taraf's ruling Syed dynasty.

Chaudhuri passed his matriculation examination from Sylhet Government School, intermediate exam in arts from Murari Chand College, bachelor's (honours) in economics from the University of Dhaka in 1951 and masters in public administration from Harvard University in 1967).

== Career ==
Chaudhuri worked as a journalist at the Morning News newspaper in the early 1950s before joining the Pakistan Taxation Service in 1955 after completing the CSS examinations. He served in different branches of the Pakistan Government service as a section officer and deputy secretary. He was a member of the Economic Pool of Pakistan.

Chaudhuri served as the First Secretary (Commercial Attaché) at the Pakistan Embassy in Belgrade, Yugoslavia, from 1967 to 1970. Following this, he was Chief Controller of Imports and Exports for the Government of Pakistan from 1970 to 1971. He served as the President of East Pakistan Sports Federation from 1966 to 1967. After the independence of Bangladesh, he briefly served as the Director-General of the Export Promotion Bureau. From 1973 to 1974, he resumed the role of Chief Controller of Imports and Exports for the Government of Bangladesh. Between 1974 and 1977, he served as Additional Secretary in the Ministry of Commerce and later as Secretary of the Internal Resources Division in the Ministry of Finance. He served as the chairman of the National Board of Revenue from 1981 to 1987.

Chaudhuri was the governor of Bangladesh Bank from 1987 to 92. He introduced a flexible exchange rate policy for Bangladesh and reduced the value of the Taka to encourage exports. He was a Temporary Alternative Governor of the International Monetary Fund.

After Chaudhuri retired from Bangladesh Bank, he started a column with the Daily Star titled "Along My Way". He served as an Adviser (the equivalent of a cabinet minister) for three months in the Habibur Rahman caretaker government of 1996, which ran the country and supervised the parliamentary elections. He was in charge of the Ministry of Industries, Ministry of Commerce, and the Ministry of Textiles and Jute. He was also the Adviser to City Bank from c. 1993/94 to 1998.

== Death ==
Chaudhuri was married to Nargis Chaudhuri. Together they had a son and a daughter, Tulip Chowdhury.

Chaudhuri died on 11 November 2020 in United Hospital, Dhaka.
