= A. K. N. Ahmed =

Bangladeshi economist and diplomat (1931 - 2016)

- এ. কে. নাজিরউদ্দীন আহমেদ

Ambassador of Bangladesh to Japan
- In office 20 January 1985 – 31 December 1987
- Preceded by: M. Matiur Rahman
- Succeeded by: A.K.M. Headaytul Huq

2nd Governor of Bangladesh Bank
- In office 19 November 1974 – 13 July 1976
- President: Mohammad Mohammadullah; Sheikh Mujibur Rahman; Khondaker Mostaq Ahmad; Abu Sadat Mohammad Sayem
- Preceded by: ANM Hamidullah
- Succeeded by: Mohammad Nurul Islam

Personal details
- Died: 24 February 2016 (aged 85) United States
- Relatives: Akbar Ali Khan (cousin)

A. K. N. Ahmed (c. 1931 – 24 February 2016) was a Bangladeshi economist and diplomat. He served as the second Governor of Bangladesh Bank, the central bank of Bangladesh from November 1974 until July 1976.

== Career ==
Ahmed worked for World Bank, International Monetary Fund, and served as a Bangladesh ambassador to Japan and South Korea. Ahmed had been the second governor of the central bank from 19 November 1974 until 13 July 1976 when he resigned from the position.

Ahmed was awarded with the Alexander the Great gold medal by the Institute of Oriental Philosophy, Soka Geiki University, Tokyo for his knowledge of Japanese culture and society.

Ahmed died at the age of 91 on 24 February 2016 after a stroke in the United States.
