= Nassa Group =

Bangladeshi industrial conglomerate

- Type: Ltd.
- Industry: Conglomerate
- Founded: 1990; 36 years ago
- Founder: Nazrul Islam Mazumder
- Headquarters: Dhaka, Bangladesh
- Area served: Europe, United States, Canada, Mexico, Nigeria
- Key people: Nazrul Islam Mazumder (chairman)
- Products: Apparel, textile
- Services: Banking, real estate, financial services, travel, education
- Revenue: ▲US$600 Million (2016)
- Number of employees: 30,000+
- Subsidiaries: ANW London Ltd; NASSA–Taipei Textile Mills Ltd; NASSA-Taipei Denims Ltd; NASSA Spinning Ltd; etc.
- Website: nassagroup.org

NASSA Group of Industries is a Bangladeshi industrial conglomerate which was founded in 1990 by Nazrul Islam Mazumder.

NASSA Group Limited has interests in garment manufacturing, banking, real estate, stockbroking, education and travel.

== History ==
In 1990, Nazrul Islam Mazumder, along with his colleagues Saiful Islam, Mohd Abdullah Al-Mamun, Nazrul Islam Swapan, Altaf and Kamrul, started their first factory, Starlight Knit-wear, under the NASSA Group's banner. The factory is still located at 2/b Elephant road, Dhaka, and had an employee count of 300 people. Nazrul Islam Swapan left the company in 2010 over a dispute over ownership with Nazrul Islam Mazumder.

In 1999, EXIM Bank was incorporated into the NASSA Group.

In 2017, after the Government of Bangladesh used intelligence agencies to remove the directors of Islami Bank Bangladesh, seven companies of NASSA received loans from the Bank without adequate collateral. NASSA group has defaulted on its loans in the past.

== Products and services ==
=== Apparel ===
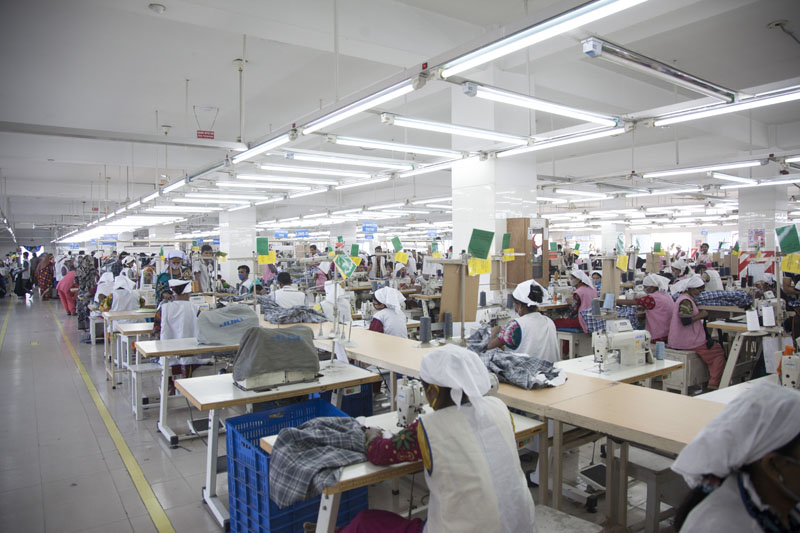
NASSA Group AJ Super Garments, Ready Made Garments production line

Since opening in 1990, NASSA Group has been involved in apparel and textile manufacturing conglomerates serving fashion, private and brand labels in the US, Canada, Mexico and the EU. NASSA Group's Ready Made Garment and textile manufacturing division is a supplier of yarns, textiles and ready-made garments for branded and private label clients. It employs 30,000 workers in 34 vertically owned factories. NASSA Group generated a turnover of US$370 million in 2013 through its contracts with retailers in the UK and US.

=== Banking ===
EXIM Bank (Export Import Bank of Bangladesh Limited) is a private commercial bank which came into operation as scheduled commercial bank on 3 August 1999 as per rules and regulations of Bangladesh Bank. Initially EXIM Bank Bangladesh Limited was known as BEXIM Bank Limited. But some legal constraints the bank renamed as EXIM Bank, which means Export Import Bank of Bangladesh Limited. The bank has 52 branches and has migrated all of its conventional banking operation into Shariah based Islamic banking.

EXIM is the first privately owned bank to open an exchange house in the UK. They have also opened exchange houses in Canada, New York and Australia.

=== Education ===
EXIM Bank Agricultural University, Bangladesh (EBAUB) is a private agricultural university at Chapainawabgang, Rajshahi.

== Controversies ==
=== Factory closure ===
In wake of the Rana plaza collapse, which is considered to be the deadliest garment-factory accident in history, NASSA Group shut down three of its factories. It was insinuated in a couple of articles that this was a reactionary response to the Rana plaza collapse rather than a proactive step to ensure the safety of the workers, but it was established that the company made the decision before the 24 April collapse because of structural concerns about the rental space that housed the three facilities and says it is committed to the safety and security of its employees. Before the closures, which took effect on 28 April, Nassa Group operated 34 factories in Bangladesh.

In an earlier version of an article in The Wall Street Journal, stated that due to the structural integrity being compromised, the government took action to close the factories down, which turned out to be wrong information. The chairman of NASSA Group, Nazrul Islam Mazumder appointed Mishcon de Reya to challenge Wall Street Journal, as NASSA Group had already decided to close the factories on their own accord before 24 April collapse, after which WSJ were compelled to change the article to reflect the facts.
