= Khorshed Alam =

Bangladesh Governor (1935–2021)

Governor of Bangladesh Bank
- In office 20 December 1992 – 21 November 1996
- Preceded by: Shegufta Bakht Chaudhuri
- Succeeded by: Lutfar Rahman Sarkar

Ambassador of Bangladesh to Turkey
- In office 6 June 1986 – 6 November 1988
- Preceded by: Mahbubul Haq
- Succeeded by: Sofi Ahmed Chowdhury

Personal details
- Born: 15 January 1935 Narsingdi, Bengal Presidency, British India
- Died: July 28, 2021 (aged 86) Dhaka, Bangladesh
- Education: Dhaka University (MA in economics); Tufts University (MA in economics); Harvard University (MPA)

Khorshed Alam (15 January 1935 – 28 July 2021) was the fifth governor of Bangladesh Bank, the central bank of Bangladesh during 1992–1996. He served as an ambassador of Bangladesh to Turkey during 1986–1988.

== Career ==
Alam served as the chairman of the board of trustees of University of Asia Pacific. He was a UAP Foundation member and trustee member.
