= Lutfar Rahman Sarkar =

Bangladeshi economist (1930 - 2013)

- লুৎফর রহমান সরকার (Bengali) لطف الرحمن سرکار (Urdu)

Governor of Bangladesh Bank
- In office 21 November 1996 – 21 November 1998
- Preceded by: Khorshed Alam
- Succeeded by: Mohammed Farashuddin

Personal details
- Born: February 1934 Phulkot, Amraul, Shahjahanpur, Bogura, British India
- Died: June 24, 2013 (aged 79) Dhaka, Bangladesh
- Resting place: Bogra
- Education: University of Dhaka

Lutfar Rahman Sarkar (1930s – 24 June 2013) was a Bangladeshi economist who served as the sixth Governor of Bangladesh Bank, the central bank of Bangladesh during 1996–1998. He served as a part-time faculty member of the University of Dhaka.

== Career ==
Sarkar served as the executive president and chief executive officer of Islami Bank Bangladesh Ltd.
