= Mohammed Farashuddin =

Bangladeshi economist (born 1942)

- মোহাম্মদ ফরাসউদ্দিন (Bengali) محمد فراش الدین (Urdu)
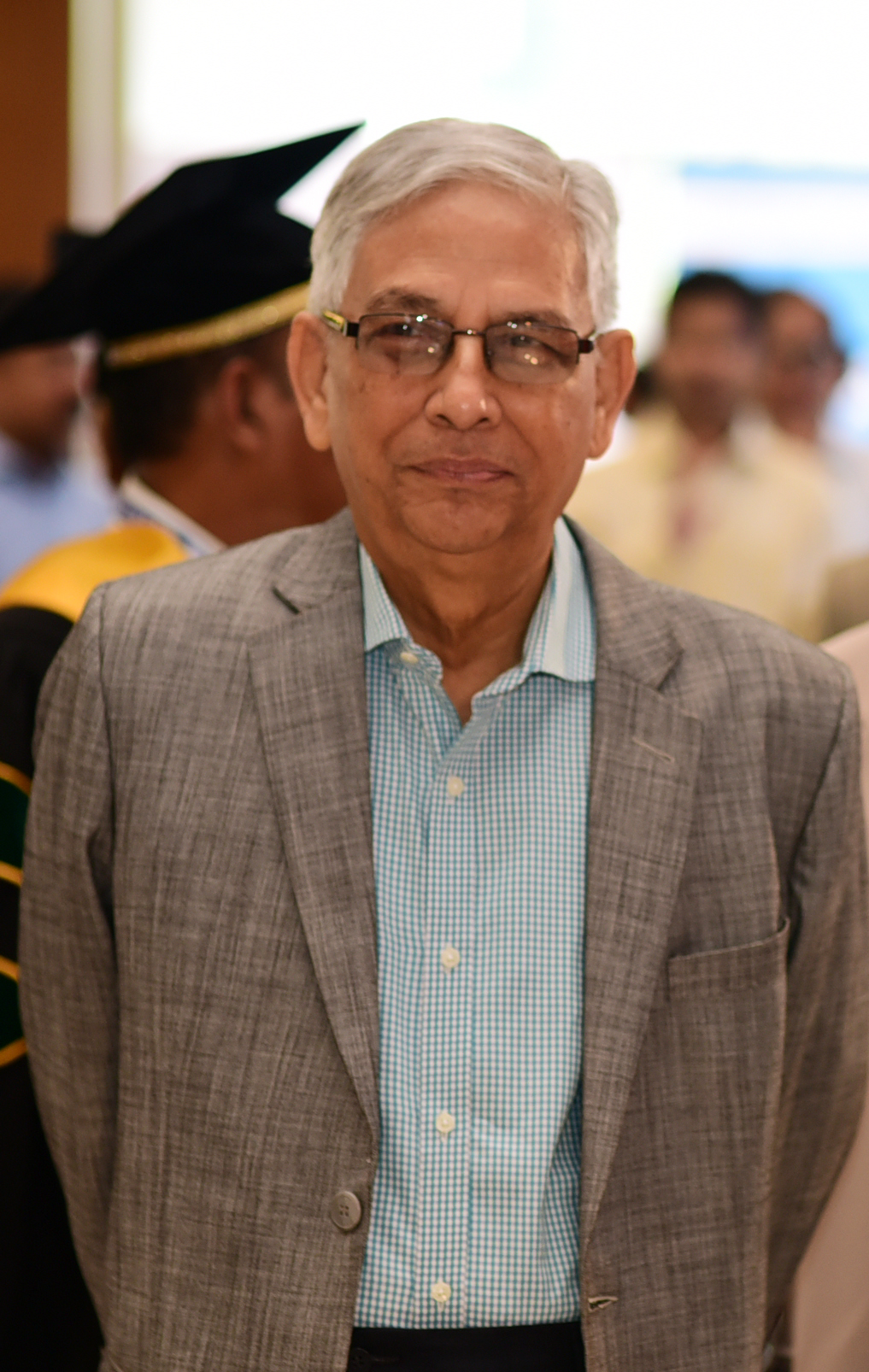
- Invited as a convocation speaker at the 2nd convocation of Premier University, Chittagong

Vice-Chancellor of East West University
- In office 1995–1998

Governor of Bangladesh Bank
- In office 24 November 1998 – 22 November 2001
- Preceded by: Lutfar Rahman Sarkar
- Succeeded by: Fakhruddin Ahmed

Personal details
- Born: 14 April 1942 (age 84) Habiganj, Assam Province, British Raj
- Spouse: Suraiya Asma
- Children: 2
- Education: Sylhet Government Pilot High School; Murari Chand College; University of Dhaka; Boston University

Mohammed Farashuddin (born 14 April 1942) is a Bangladeshi economist who served as the founding vice-chancellor of East West University and the seventh governor of Bangladesh Bank.

== Early life ==
He was born on April 14, 1942, in the village of Ratanpur, located in Nayapara Union, Habiganj, Assam Province, British Raj.

== Education ==
He completed his SSC and HSC at Sylhet Government High School in 1958 and Sylhet MC College in 1960. He earned Bachelor in Economics from the University of Dhaka in 1963 and completed his Master in Economics at the same institution in 1964. He further pursued his education in the United States, obtaining a Master of Arts in Political Economy from Boston University in 1978. He later achieved his PhD in 1979 from there.

== Career ==
In 1966, he passed the Central Superior Services examination and joined the administrative cadre. He worked in field positions as the sub-divisional officer of Jamalpur, additional deputy commissioner of Rajshahi, acting deputy commissioner, and additional commissioner of Karachi.

From 1973 to 1975, Farashuddin served as the private secretary to Sheikh Mujibur Rahman. He was one of the founders of East West University and served as its founding vice-chancellor from 1995 to 1998. Farashuddin then served as the governor of Bangladesh Bank from 1998 to 2001. He currently holds the position of chairperson of the Board of Trustees at the East West University .

== Politics ==
Farashuddin was involved in Bangladesh Students' Union during his student life. He aspired to be the candidate of the Awami League from the Habiganj-4 constituency in the 2018 Bangladeshi general election.

He has an affirmative stance on Sheikh Mujibur Rahman autocratic rule during BAKSAL. However, a one-party dictatorship under the Bangladesh Krishak Sramik Awami League, with tight control of the media and judiciary, turned the dream into a nightmare. Lawrence Lifschultz wrote in the Far Eastern Economic Review in 1974 that Bangladeshis thought “the corruption and malpractices and plunder of national wealth” under Mujib “unprecedented.” Eventually, the plunder of national wealth caused the Bangladesh famine of 1974.

During the post-BAKSAL political turmoil, Farashuddin is alleged to have compromised with the subsequent government led by Khondaker Mushtaq, which may have spared him from persecution. His CV lacks information about his activities from 1975 to 1979, and he abstained from a significant memorial event for Sheikh Mujib held abroad. Awami League politicians, such as R.A.M. Obaidul Muktadir Chowdhury, have expressed dissatisfaction with those who later claimed loyalty to Sheikh Mujib but did not protest his murder at the time. The history of the chaos following the assassination, particularly under the Zia and Ershad governments, is considered crucial to understanding the nation's political landscape.

== Views ==
=== Bangladesh Bank robbery ===
In December 2016, Mohammed Farashuddin provided insights regarding an investigation into a significant heist. He made it clear that the officials implicated were of low to mid-level rank and not directly responsible for the crime. He characterized these officials as "negligent" and "careless," labeling them as "indirect accomplices" to the wrongdoing. He concluded that the heist was predominantly orchestrated by external elements rather than insiders within the institution.

In an interview with Reuters about the inquiry into the financial crime, Farashuddin stated:

"The officials were low to mid-level and not directly involved in the crime. They were negligent, careless, and indirect accomplices. The committee concluded that the heist was essentially committed by external elements."

== Personal life ==
Farashuddin married Suraiya Asma. He has one son and one daughter.
