= Mutual Trust Bank =

Commercial bank in Bangladesh

Mutual Trust Bank PLC
- Company type: Private (Non-Government)
- Industry: Banking
- Founded: October, 24, 1999 Dhaka, Bangladesh
- Headquarters: Dhaka, Bangladesh
- Key people: Syed Mahbubur Rahman (Managing Director and CEO)
- Products: Banking services Consumer Banking; Corporate Banking; Investment Banking; Islamic Banking
- Net income: ▲ ৳ 286 Crore (2023)
- Website: mutualtrustbank.com

New wordmark of Mutual Trust Bank PLC to be used from February 2025

Mutual Trust Bank PLC (Bengali: মিউচুয়াল ট্রাস্ট ব্যাংক পিএলসি) is a private commercial bank headquartered in Dhaka, Bangladesh. Rashed Ahmed Chowdhury is the chairman of Mutual Trust Bank PLC.

The company was incorporated as a public limited company in 1999, under the Companies Act 1994, with an authorized share capital of BDT 1,000,000,000 divided into 10,000,000 ordinary shares of BDT 100 each. At present, the authorized share capital of the company is BDT 10,000,000,000 divided into 1,000,000,000 ordinary shares of BDT 10 each.

== History ==
Mutual Trust Bank Limited was established on 29 September 1999. Syed Manzur Elahi was the founding chairman of the Bank. Harris Chowdhury, former political secretary to Prime Minister Khaleda Zia, was a shareholder of the bank.

In April 2007, Bangladesh Bank found evidence that Nurunnabi, a Chittagong businessman had embezzled 6.28 billion BDT from 10 banks using false documents under 32 company names. It included one billion BDT from Mutual Trust Bank branch in Khatunganj. In 2009, Anis A Khan was appointed managing director of Mutual Trust Bank Limited.

In July 2013, the Bangladesh Police arrested an IT officer of Mutual Trust Bank Limited for being involved in an ATM forgery case.

In 2015, the bank became one of two local partners of Life Insurance Corporation of India in Bangladesh. The Daily Star 15th Bangladesh Business Awards described the bank as "one of the best-run banks in Bangladesh". Anis A Khan was re-appointed managing director of Mutual Trust Bank Limited in 2015 for a four year term.

Norfund, the investment fund of the Norwegian government announced plans to purchase 10 per cent of Mutual Trust Bank Limited in September 2018.

According to the Anti-Corruption Commission in December 2019, a manager of the Mutual Trust Bank Limited had stolen 49.9 million taka from a client of the bank.

MTB Foundation is the charity arm of Mutual Trust Bank Limited. The MTB Foundation announced the creation of Niloufer Manzur Memorial Scholarship named after Niloufer Manzur, principal of Sunbeams School in November 2021.

In May 2022, Associated Builders Corporations (ABC Group) announced plans to sell 27 per cent shares of the Mutual Trust Bank Limited at the block market to be purchased by an independent director of ABC Group, Rashed Ahmed Chowdhury. The chairman of the Bangladesh Securities and Exchange Commission, Shibli-Rubayat-Ul Islam, approved the sale of 5 billion BDT worth of bonds by Mutual Trust Bank Limited. In August the bank signed a cash management agreement with the Paragon Group.

== Memberships ==
- The Institute of Bankers, Bangladesh
- Bangladesh Association of Banks
- Bangladesh Foreign Exchange Dealer Association
- Bangladesh Institute of Bank Management
- Bangladesh Association of Publicly Listed Companies
- Metropolitan Chamber of Commerce and Industry, Dhaka
- International Chamber of Commerce Bangladesh
- Dhaka Stock Exchange
- Dhaka Chamber of Commerce & Industry
- Federation of Bangladesh Chambers of Commerce and Industry
- American Chamber of Commerce in Bangladesh

=== Board of directors] ===
Name	Position
Rashed Ahmed Chowdhury	Chairman
Dr. Arif Dowla	Vice Chairman (Representing Advanced Chemical Industries Ltd.)
Md. Abdul Malek	Director (Immediate Past Chairman) & Chairman, MTB Board Risk Management Committee
Md. Wakiluddin	Director
Md. Hedayetullah	Director
Syed Nasim Manzur	Director & Chairman, MTB Board Executive Committee
Khwaja Nargis Hossain	Director
Tapan Chowdhury	Director (representing Astras Ltd.)
Daniel Donald De Lange	Director (representing Norfund)
Dr. Mohammad Tareque	Independent Director & Chairman, MTB Board Audit Committee
Shib Narayan Kairy	Independent Director
Zareen Mahmud Hosein	Independent Director
Syed Mahbubur Rahman	Managing Director & CEO
