= Nazrul Islam Mazumder =

Bangladeshi industrialist and businessman

- নজরুল ইসলাম মজুমদার

Chairman of Nassa Group
- Incumbent
- Assumed office 1990

Chairman of Bangladesh Association of Banks
- In office 21 January 2008 – 9 September 2024
- Preceding: Abdul Hai Sarkar
- Preceded by: M. Syeduzzaman

Personal details
- Born: September 1956 (age 70)
- Citizenship: Bangladesh
- Domestic partner: Nasrin Islam
- Children: 2
- Education: University of Chittagong
- Occupation: Businessman

Nazrul Islam Mazumder (born December 1956; locally known as Helal Saheb) is a Bangladeshi industrialist and businessman, best known as the founder and chairman of Nassa Group. Under his leadership, Nassa Group, established in 1990, has grown into one of the country's largest conglomerates, with operations spanning sectors including apparel manufacturing, banking, real estate, stock brokerage, education, and travel.

== Early life ==
Mazumder was born in December 1956 in Laksam Upazila of Comilla District, Bangladesh. He graduated with an Honours degree in English from Chittagong University and later a master's degree in the same subject in 1980.

== Career ==
Mazumder founded the Nassa Group of Industries in 1990. Since its establishment, he has been serving as the chairman of the group.

Mazumder established the Exim Bank Agricultural University Bangladesh (EBAUBI) at Boro Indara More, Sadar Upazila, Chapainawabganj district. It is recognized as the country's first private agricultural university. He also established a Deobandi Madrasa in his area in 2002. After the founding chairman died, he served as chairman from 2009 to August 2024. In January 2008, he was elected chairman of the Bangladesh Association of Banks (BAB), an organization of private bank entrepreneurs. He served as the chairman of the BAB for nearly 17 years during the Awami League government from 2008.

On 17 February 2025, the Anti-Corruption Commission (ACC) filed a case against Mazumder for amassing illegal wealth worth 7.81 billion BDT. The ACC believes he has acquired such huge wealth by abusing his power, which his income cannot explain. The same complaint states that he has benefited entrepreneurs with vested interests by collecting donations from various banks and reforming the Bank Company Act.

On 25 August 2024, Bangladesh Bank restructured the board of directors of Exim Bank and removed the names of Mazumder and his wife from the board of directors. At the same time, the Bangladesh Financial Intelligence Unit (BFIU) froze his and his wife's bank accounts. Accordingly, on 1 January 2025, he and his family were banned from travelling abroad. Later, on 4 February 2025, the Dhaka Criminal Special Judge's Court ordered the seizure of 52 bank accounts of his wife and two children. On 2 October 2024, the police arrested him from the Gulshan area of Dhaka and interrogated him in the ACC case as well as in the murder case of a student at that time. The investigating agency observed that he had assets worth about £43.23 million in the United Kingdom, which he is suspected of having acquired without legal means.

== Personal life ==
Mazumder's wife, Nasrin Islam, is the venture director of Exim Bank. The couple has two children: elder daughter Anika Islam is a director of Nassa Properties Limited in London, and son Walid Ibne Islam was director of Nassa Group in Bangladesh from 2013 to 2021.

== See also ==
- Bangladesh Association of Banks
