= Nahara =

Nahara may refer to:

== Places ==
- Nahara, Gujarat, a village and former princely (e)state under Baroda Agency, in Gujarat, India
- Nahara Rigaul, a village development committee in Siraha District, Sagarmatha Zone, south-eastern Nepal

== Other ==
- Nahara (moth), a synonym of the moth genus Dierna in the family Erebidae
- Nahara Masayuki, a character in Ultraman Tiga

== See also ==
- Abar-Nahara, 'Ābēr Nahrā (Syriac) or Ebir-Nari), a western Asian satrapy of the Neo-Assyrian Empire (911-605 BC), Neo-Babylonian Empire (612-539 BC) and Achaemenid Empire (539-332 BC), roughly corresponding with the Levant (modern Syria), also known as Aramea
- Nahar (disambiguation)
- Nahariya, a city in Israel
