= Mufti Nurunnessa Khatun =

Mufti Nurunnessa Khatun Sylheti: ꠝꠥꠚꠔꠤ ꠘꠥꠞꠥꠘ꠆ꠘꠦꠍꠣ ꠈꠣꠔꠥꠘ (31 December 1939 – 4 December 1997) was a Bangladeshi writer, academic, and botanist.

== Early life ==
Khatun was born on 31 December 1939 in Sylhet, Assam, British Raj. She lived in Shillong during her childhood. In 1947 she moved to Sylhet, the same year Sylhet was joined to East Bengal to become part of the future state of Pakistan through the Sylhet referendum. She graduated from Government Girls' School in Sylhet in 1953. She graduated from Murari Chand College after completing her ISc and BSc. She did her MSc in Mycology and Phytopathology from the University of Dhaka.

== Career ==
She taught briefly at Quaid-e-Azam College, Dhaka and Women's College, Sylhet. In 1967, she joined Murari Chand College in Sylhet and in 1967 she became an assistant professor in Jagannath College. She went to England for further studies and graduated in 1971 with an MSc from the University of Liverpool. She became a member of the Royal National Rose Society in England. She then taught at Eden Girls' College and from 1973 to 1975 she taught in Begum Badrunnessa Mohila College. She was promoted to the head of the Departments of Botany and Zoology in 1975 at Begum Badrunnessa Mohila College, a position she held till 1981. The same year she founded Bangladesh National Rose Society. She organized rose exhibitions in Bangladesh and helped establish Floriculture in the country. In 1992 she joined Khulna Mohila College as Vice-Principal and professor of Botany. She retired the same year for health reasons. She was a lifelong member of Bangladesh Botanical Society. She wrote a book about roses, Golap.

== Death ==
Khatun died on 4 December 1997.
