= M. Ataur Rahman =

Bangladeshi navy officer and businessman

- Born: 18 October 1927; Narayanganj, Bengal Presidency, British India
- Died: 20 March 2021 (aged 93); Dhaka, Bangladesh
- Military career
- Allegiance: Pakistan (before 1972); Bangladesh
- Branch: Pakistan Navy; Bangladesh Navy
- Service years: 1950 - 1976
- Rank: Commodore
- Commands: Chairman of Bangladesh Inland Water Transport Authority; Chairman of Mongla Port Authority; Chairman of Bangladesh Trade and Tariff Commission
- Other work: Chairman of Ibn Sina Trust; Chairman of Islami Bank Bangladesh; Chairman of Diganta Media Corporation Ltd

M Ataur Rahman (18 October 1927 – 20 March 2021) was a Bangladesh Navy commodore, former chairman of Ibn Sina Trust, chairman of Islami Bank Bangladesh and chairman of Diganta Media Corporation Ltd.

== Early life and education ==
Rahman was born on 18 October 1927 in Narayanganj District, Bengal Presidency, British India (now in Dhaka Division, Bangladesh). He completed his Bachelor of Science degree in engineering from Bengal Engineering College from Shibpur, India in 1949.

== Military career ==
Rahman was commissioned as sub-lieutenant in Pakistan Navy in 1950. He was an engineer officer and completed his post graduation from Royal Naval Engineering College. After the independence of Bangladesh he repatriated from Pakistan in 1973. He joined the Bangladesh Navy. He was appointed as the chairman of the Bangladesh Inland Water Transport Authority. He retired from Bangladesh Navy in 1976 but continued to serve his government office with the rank of a secretary. Later he served as the chairman of the Mongla Port Authority. On 27 October 1980 he was appointed as the chairman of the Bangladesh Trade and Tariff Commission. He served this position until his retirement on 30 January 1984.

After his retirement from government services he served as the chairman of Islami Bank Bangladesh, a position which he held for 17 years. He also served as the chairman of Ibn Sina Trust. He was also the founding chairman of Diganta Media Corporation Ltd.

== Death ==
Rahman died on 20 March 2021 in Dhaka, Bangladesh.
