= Mohammad Rafiq (poet) =

Bangladeshi poet (1943–2023)

- মোহাম্মদ রফিক
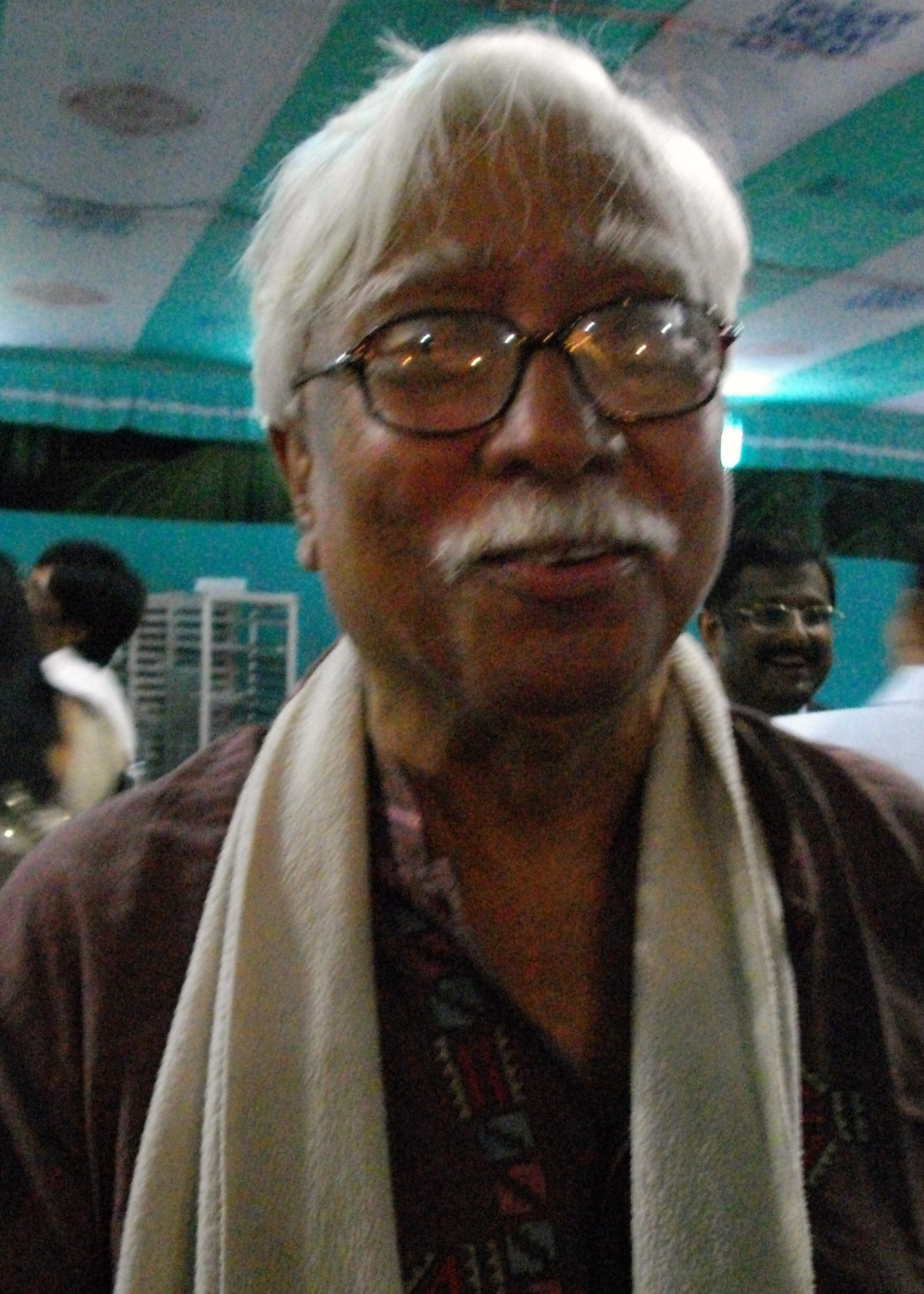
- Rafiq in 2009
- Born: 23 October 1943; Baitpur, Bagerhat, Bengal Presidency, British India
- Died: 6 August 2023 (aged 79); Barisal District, Bangladesh
- Education: Dhaka College; University of Dhaka
- Occupations: Poet, academic

Mohammad Rafiq (23 October 1943 – 6 August 2023) was a Bangladeshi poet. He was awarded the Bangla Academy Literary Award in 1987 and the Ekushey Padak in 2010.

== Early life ==
Rafiq was born on 23 October 1943 in the village of Baitpur, Bagerhat, Bangladesh (then India). His brother, Mohammad Tareque, was the Secretary of Finance of Bangladesh. In his youth, his country was going through political instability. During his student life at Dhaka University, he was a political activist and was arrested and jailed twice. Pakistani martial law court sentenced him to ten years of hard labor. He was later released to complete his university studies. During the War of Independence of Bangladesh, he served as a Sector-1 commander and motivated the freedom fighters. Later, he worked with the Swadhin Bangla Betar Kendra.

== Bangladesh and autocratic regime ==
"Through Mohammad Rafiq's dozen volumes of poetry, Bengali readers have witnessed not only the evolution of a distinctive personal vision and style but also a reflection of the changing fortunes of a homeland—all against a backdrop of a folk tradition (a typically Bengali mix of Hindu and Muslim lore) and timeless images of water and sky, sun and rain, clouds and dust. This is not to say that Rafiq's poems tend to be predominantly "political" (other poets of Bangladesh more regularly respond to specific events and issues). Rather, an awareness of Bangladesh's freedom struggle, the time of idealism and hope after independence, and the long dark period of military rule after the assassination of the new nation's first democratically elected leader, Sheikh Mujib Rahman, should help readers from less turbulent parts of the world understand the potentially explosive impact of a particular literary work and the extraordinary risks that a writer may take in writing and publishing it. When Hossain Muhammad Ershad—a dictator who fancied himself a poet—seized power in 1982, the people of Bangladesh had to endure crushing repression from his regime and the growing forces of communalism."

During the dictatorship of Hossain Muhammad Ershad, Rafiq wrote Khola Kabita (Open Poem), which was published as a leaflet and circulated throughout the country. It was the first voice raised against the unlawful military autocracy. It became very popular among the student activists, who performed the poem as drama and song. Later, he was summoned and interrogated before a military board of inquiry. A warrant for his arrest was also issued. By this time, Mohammad Rafiq had escaped and begun to live in hiding.

== Career ==
Rafiq worked as a teacher at Chittagong College and Dhaka College. In 1993, he was a resident at the International Writing Program (University of Iowa). After working in the Department of English, Jahangirnagar University, for three decades, he retired in 2009.

== Death ==
Rafiq died on 6 August 2023, at the age of 79.

== Awards ==
- 1981: Alaol Literary Award
- 1987: Bangla Academy Literary Award
- 2010: Ekushey Padak

== Works ==
- 1970: Boishakhi Purnima
- 1976: Dhulor Shonshare Ei Mati
- 1979: Kirtinasha
- 1983: Khola Kobita
- 1983: Kapila
- 1986: Gaodiya
- 1988: Shodeshi Nishshash Tumi Moy
- 1991: Meghay Ebong Kadai
