= Nahor =

Nahor, Nachor, or Naghor may refer to:

- Nahor, son of Serug, a person mentioned in the Bible and the father of Terah and paternal grandfather of Abraham
- Nahor, son of Terah, a person mentioned in the Bible and the brother of Abraham
- Nahor, a town in the region of Aram-Naharaim that was named after the son of Terah and possibly an old name for al-Kifl in Iraq
- Nahor, Virginia, an unincorporated community in the United States
- Nahor, Assamese name for Mesua ferrea, a tree

== See also ==
- Nahar (disambiguation)
