= Nahr =

Nahr may refer to:

- Nahr (toponymy), a component of Arabic toponyms literally meaning "river"
- Al-Nahr, a Palestinian village
- Non-allelic homologous recombination

== See also ==
- Nahar (disambiguation)
