= Fouad Abdulhameed Alkhateeb =

Saudi Arabian diplomat, author and businessman

Ambassador of Saudi Arabia to Nigeria
- In office 1969–1972
- Monarch: Faisal of Saudi Arabia
- Succeeded by: Khaled Abed Rabbo

Ambassador of Saudi Arabia to Turkey
- In office March 1976 – June 1976
- Monarch: Khalid of Saudi Arabia
- Preceded by: Mohammed Said Basrawi
- Succeeded by: Sheikh Muhammad Al Awadi

Ambassador of Saudi Arabia to Bangladesh and Nepal
- In office 1976 – 1984 in Dhaka till october 1982
- Monarch: Khalid of Saudi Arabia
- Preceded by: Ali Abdul Wahab
- Succeeded by: Abdul Latif Abdullah Ibrahim al-Maimanee

Ambassador of Saudi Arabia to Malaysia
- In office 1984–1987
- Monarchs: Khalid of Saudi Arabia; Fahd of Saudi Arabia
- Succeeded by: Mohammad Reza Abu Hamyel

Personal details
- Born: 1925 Makkah
- Died: 1995 (aged 69–70) Jeddah
- Spouse: Mahasin Alzaraa
- Children: Fatimah, Wafaa, Nadiah, Iman, Mohammed, Abdulhameed, Aisha, Abu Baker
- Education: Cairo University, University of Baghdad

Fouad Abdulhameed Ahmad Alkhateeb (Arabic: فؤاد بن عبد الحميد الخطيب; 1925 - October 28, 1995), was a Saudi Arabian ambassador, humanitarian, author, and businessman. In his capacity as a diplomat, he represented his homeland in Pakistan, Iraq, the United States of America, the Federal Republic of Nigeria, the Republic of Turkey, the People's Republic of Bangladesh, Nepal, and finally as Saudi ambassador to Malaysia.

== Diplomatic career ==
Alkhateeb began his diplomatic career as an assistant to his father, Sheikh Abdulhameed Alkhateeb, who was at the time the first Saudi Arabian ambassador to the Islamic Republic of Pakistan. He was subsequently appointed as the Saudi Chargé d'affaires to the Republic of Iraq, where he earned a Bachelor of Science degree in Economics from the University of Baghdad. Soon after, Alkhateeb was appointed to the position of Counselor within the Saudi Kingdom's embassy in The United States; this appointment spurred his diplomatic career to new heights and he received a succession of other appointments (Nigeria, Turkey, Bangladesh, Nepal, and Malaysia).

=== Bangladesh ===
Alkhateeb was the first Ambassador of the Kingdom of Saudi Arabia to the then-newly independent People's Republic of Bangladesh in 1975, a country fresh from gaining independence from Pakistan four yearly earlier (The People's Republic of Bangladesh was formerly known as East Pakistan) Through his ambassadorship position in Bangladesh, Alkhateeb left a lasting impression on the young nation's economic, religious, and humanitarian affairs. In 1981, he founded the Ibn Sina Trust and the Ibn Sina Medical Group in Bangladesh, which has grown to become one of the largest medical groups in Bangladesh today, operating multiple hospitals, pharmaceutical companies, medical equipment manufacturers, medical colleges, and universities within Bangladesh.

Fouad Alkhateeb, contributed to the establishment of the first Islamic bank in Bangladesh in 1983, the Islami Bank Bangladesh Ltd, which attracted other Saudi and Arab investors from the Persian Gulf area to contribute to its establishment. This bank remains today one of the largest banks in Bangladesh, with over 250 branches, 10,000 employees, and has to successfully funded over 5 million projects throughout Bangladesh since its inception. Additionally, the bank currently holds a large portfolio of Special Projects which aim to serve the country's impoverished and struggling families, which include erecting hospitals, schools, universities, and cultural centers across the country.

=== Malaysia ===
Alkhateeb's final post as a Saudi Ambassador was in Malaysia; soon after, he decided to bring his foreign diplomatic career to a close and return to his family in Saudi Arabia. Upon his return, he was appointed as the Assistant Secretary-General of the Organization of Islamic Conference (OIC) which was renamed in 2011 to the Organization of Islamic Cooperation. He then went on to become Secretary General of the General Council for Islamic Banks and Financial Institutions (CIBAFI) (which was then the International Union of Islamic Banks).

== Death ==
On October 28, 1995, Fouad Alkhateeb died in the Saudi city of Jeddah; he was laid to rest in the city of his birth, Makkah.
