= Md Mostaqur Rahman =

Governor of Bangladesh Bank (born 1966)

- মোঃ মোস্তাকুর রহমান

14th Governor of Bangladesh Bank
- Incumbent
- Assumed office 26 February 2026
- President: Mohammed Shahabuddin; Hafiz Uddin Ahmad (acting); Mirza Fakhrul Islam Alamgir
- Prime Minister: Tarique Rahman
- Preceded by: Ahsan H. Mansur

Personal details
- Born: 12 May 1966 (age 60) Dacca, East Pakistan
- Citizenship: Bangladesh
- Education: B.Com, M.Com
- Alma mater: University of Dhaka
- Profession: Accountant and businessman

Md Mostaqur Rahman (Bengali: মোঃ মোস্তাকুর রহমান; born 12 May 1966) is a Bangladeshi cost and management accountant, corporate executive, entrepreneur, and financial governance specialist. He is the 14th Governor of Bangladesh Bank, and the first governor of the Bangladesh Bank who is a businessman.

== Early life ==
Rahman was born on 12 May 1966. He completed his Bachelor of Commerce in Accounting in 1987 ‍and Master of Commerce in Accounting in 1988 from the University of Dhaka. In 1992, he graduated as a Cost and Management Accountant from the Institute of Cost and Management Accountants of Bangladesh, and also obtained a Bachelor's Degree in Law (LL.B).

== Career ==
Prior to joining Bangladesh Bank, Rahman was the Managing Director and CEO of an export oriented sweater company. He was also a member of the Bangladesh Garment Manufacturers and Exporters Association (BGMEA) and a member of the Real Estate and Housing Association of Bangladesh (REHAB), the Dhaka Chamber of Commerce and Industry, and the Association of Travel Agents of Bangladesh. He was a Board Member of Chittagong Stock Exchange from 1998 to 2000. On 26 February 2026, he became the 14th Governor of the Bangladesh Bank.

== Social work ==
Rahman has been involved in various social and charity work since his student days. He was actively engaged with various organisations involved in the welfare of disabled children, providing palliative care for terminally ill patients, and ensuring quality education for underprivileged children. For many years, he was a Member of Lions Clubs International, and served as Cabinet Treasurer of District 315A2.
