= Fazle Kabir =

Bangladeshi bureaucrat, economist, and central banker (born 1955)

- ফজলে কবির
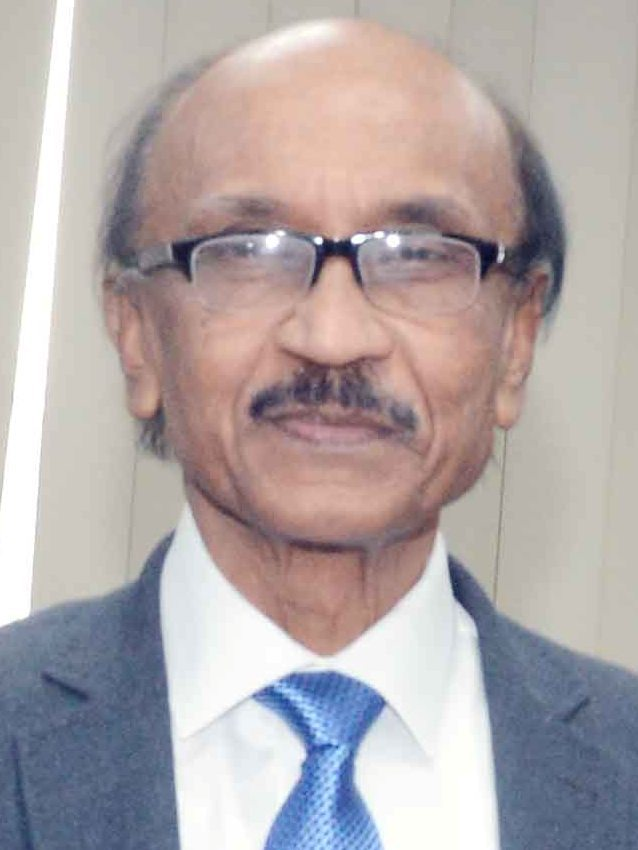

11th Governor of Bangladesh Bank
- In office 15 March 2016 – 3 July 2022
- President: Abdul Hamid
- Prime Minister: Sheikh Hasina
- Preceded by: Atiur Rahman
- Succeeded by: Abdur Rouf Talukder

Personal details
- Born: 4 July 1956 (age 70) Dhaka, East Bengal, Dominion of Pakistan
- Spouse: Mahmuda Sharmin Benu
- Education: MA (economics)
- Alma mater: Faujdarhat Cadet College, University of Chittagong

Fazle Kabir (born July 4, 1955) is a Bangladeshi bureaucrat, economist, and central banker. He served as the 11th Governor of Bangladesh Bank, the central bank of Bangladesh. Prior to this position, he served as the Finance Secretary to the government and chairman of the state-owned Sonali Bank. He also served as a director of another state-owned Janata Bank.

== Early life ==
Kabir was born on July 4, 1955, in Hasail Banari Union of Tongibari upozila in Dhaka Bikrampur (present day Munshiganj district) then East Pakistan (now Bangladesh).He completed his secondary and higher secondary education at Faujdarhat Cadet College. He obtained his bachelor's and master's degrees in economics from the University of Chittagong.

== Career ==
Kabir started his career in 1980 with Bangladesh Railway as an assistant traffic superintendent. In 1983, he joined the BCS Administration Cadre, aka Bangladesh Administrative Service. During his 34 years of civil service, Kabir held various key positions in different ministries and also in field administration. He served as the Deputy Commissioner and District Magistrate of Kishoreganj District, Joint Secretary in the Ministry of Education, Director General of the National Academy for Planning and Development (NAPD), Director General of the Bangladesh Civil Service Administration Academy, and Secretary of the Ministry of Railways. He was appointed as a senior secretary to the ministry of finance in 2012. Kabir was made chairman of Sonali Bank after it was hit by several financial scams, including one involving Hall-Mark Group.

On March 15, 2016, the then governor Atiur Rahman resigned from his post amid the Bangladesh Bank money laundering case. He submitted his resignation letter to Prime Minister Sheikh Hasina, and within two hours, Kabir was selected as the new four-year-term governor of Bangladesh Bank. He joined as the 11th Governor of Bangladesh Bank on March March 20, 2016. On July 15, 2020, the government appointed Fazle Kabir governor of the Bangladesh Bank again for two years until he turned 67 under the amended Bangladesh Bank Act.

== Personal life ==
Kabir is married to Mahmuda Sharmin Benu. She is a former Secretary of the Government.
