= The Institute of Bankers, Bangladesh =

Banking body

The Institute Of Bankers, Bangladesh (IBB)
- Abbreviation: IBB
- Formation: 6 February 1973; 53 years ago
- Type: National Professional Banking Body
- Purpose: Conduct Banking Professional Examination in 08 (eight) divisions nationally (2 times a year) to develop world class banking professionals in banking and financial sector
- Professional title: JAIBB, AIBB
- Headquarters: DR Tower (Lift-12), Box Culvert Road (Dainik Bangla), Purana Paltan, Dhaka, Bangladesh
- Location: Dhaka
- Region served: Bangladesh
- President: Honorable Governor (Bangladesh Bank)
- Vice President: CEO and Managing Director, Sonali Bank PLC
- Director General: Ms. Laila Bilkis Ara (Retired Executive Director, Bangladesh Bank)
- Secretary: A running Executive Director (ED) of Bangladesh Bank
- Website: ibb.org.bd

Established in 1973, The Institute of Bankers, Bangladesh (IBB) is the sole national professional banking body of banks and nonbank financial institutions (NBFIs) in Bangladesh in terms of conducting banking professional examination (BPE) which is mandatory for all professionals (Banks/ NBFIs) for job promotion. It is managed as an autonomous professional body under the control and supervision (not subsidiary) of Bangladesh Bank.

== History ==
The Institute of Bankers was registered on the 6 February 1973 as an association under the Societies Registration Act, 1660 (Act No. XXI of 1660). Before that some eminent bankers and other professionals decided, in a meeting held on 26 July 1972, to establish the institute as a professional body of banks and financial institutions in Bangladesh. The main objective of the body is to develop professionally qualified and competent bankers primarily through a process of training, examinations and professional development programs.

On 8 February 2023, Bangladesh Bank has issued a circular stating that passing banking professional examination both parts (JAIBB & AIBB) is mandatory from 1 January 2024 for all bankers to get promoted to any higher grade from senior officer except managing director. However, many bankers, finance professionals, economists and related personnel expressed mixed reactions to the new circular. Most stated that criteria mandatory diploma pass for getting promotion will rises discriminatory.

== Functions ==
IBB arranges two-tier banking professional examination (BPE) (currently 99th exam has been held during November 2024) for the professionals in banking and financial sector in the country. Applicants have to appear in the part-I examination, officially named as JAIBB (junior associate of the institute of bankers, Bangladesh) where every applicant have to pass six compulsory courses. The courses include: monetary and financial system, governance in financial institutions, principles of economics, laws and practice of general banking, organization & management business communication in financial institutions. After completing part-I, applicants have to appear in the part-II examination, officially named as AIBB (associate of the institute of bankers, Bangladesh) where every applicant have to pass five compulsory courses named risk management in financial institutions, credit operations and management, trade finance and foreign exchange, information and communication technology in financial institutions, treasury management in financial institutions and one optional course from eight choices named accounting for financial institutions, agriculture & microfinance, sustainable finance, shariah based banking, investment banking, management accounting, marketing and branding in financial services, financial crime and compliance. After completing every part, every applicant is awarded with a certificate.

== Governing body ==
The council or parishad (consisting of 30 members; all are from deputy governors and managing directors (Running/ Ex) of all Banks/ NBFIs) and Fellows governs the institute. The president of the council is the governor of Bangladesh Bank. The vice-president is the CEO & managing director of Sonali Bank PLC, the largest state-owned commercial bank operating in Bangladesh. The chief executive officer/ director general of IBB will be appointed by the council for 02 (two) years on contractual basis. Besides, a secretary (deputation from Bangladesh Bank equivalent to `executive director'(ED) rank) is responsible for the overall management of the organization. Currently, Ms. Laila Bilkis Ara (retired executive director of Bangladesh Bank) has been serving as the director general of the institution from April 2021. An executive director of Bangladesh Bank has been acting as secretary for management of the institution from time to time basis.

== Membership ==
Generally, the CEOs and managing directors of banks and nonbank financial institutions (NBFIs) (local and multinational) operating in Bangladesh are members (currently 100 members) of the institute. However, the council or parishad has the solo right to elect new member and remove existing members.

== Golden jubilee (50 years) publication ==
- Sornotorir Oritro* (স্বর্ণতরীর অরিত্র) is the souvenir published by IBB for the celebration of 50 years in 2023.

== See also ==
- Bangladesh Association of Banks
- Bangladesh Institute of Bank Management
- The Institute of Chartered Accountants of Bangladesh
