= Ahsan H. Mansur =

Bangladeshi economist and Governor of Bangladesh Bank (born 1950)

Ahsan Habib Mansur
- আহসান হাবিব মনসুর
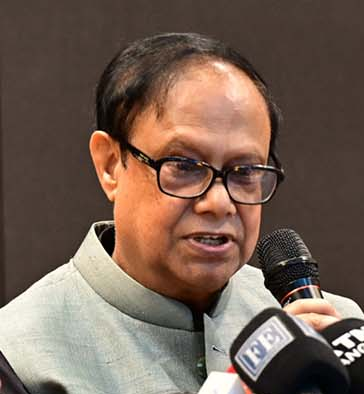
- Mansur in 2025

13th Governor of Bangladesh Bank
- In office 14 August 2024 – 25 February 2026
- President: Mohammed Shahabuddin
- Prime Minister: Muhammad Yunus (acting); Tarique Rahman
- Preceded by: Abdur Rouf Talukder
- Succeeded by: Md Mostaqur Rahman

Personal details
- Born: 1950/1951 (age 75–76) East Bengal, Pakistan
- Education: Dhaka College; University of Dhaka; McMaster University; University of Western Ontario
- Profession: Economist

Ahsan Habib Mansur is a Bangladeshi economist who served as the 13th governor of Bangladesh Bank from his appointment by the interim government of Muhammad Yunus in August 2024 until his replacement by the BNP led government formed in the aftermath of the 2026 Bangladeshi general election. He was the director of the Policy Research Institute, Bangladesh. He was also the chairman of BRAC Bank and an independent director of Walton.

== Early life ==
Mansur completed his bachelor's in economics from the University of Dhaka in 1974. He became a lecturer at the University of Dhaka in 1976. He completed his master's in economics from McMaster University in 1977. He did his PhD at the University of Western Ontario in 1982.

== Career ==
Mansur joined the International Monetary Fund in 1981. He worked at the Fiscal Affairs Department of the International Monetary Fund from 1983 to 1989. From 1991 to 1995, Mansur served in the Policy Development and Review Department and the Middle Eastern Department of the International Monetary Fund.

Mansur was appointed a finance advisor to the Minister of Finance Wahidul Haq in 1989 and served till 1991. From 1996 to 2007, he served in the Middle East and Central Asia Department of the International Monetary Fund. From 1994 to 2007, he served as senior resident representative of the International Monetary Fund in Afghanistan, Pakistan, Jordan, Kuwait, Oman, Sudan, and Yemen.

Mansur joined the Policy Research Institute of Bangladesh as executive director. Mansur was appointed chairman of BRAC Bank on 27 August 2019, replacing Sir Fazle Hasan Abed after he retired; it is unknown if he retains shares in the bank. He is a member of the Editorial Advisory Board of the Policy Insights.

Mansur had questioned the GDP figures of the government of Bangladesh, which did not match with macroeconomic indicators in 2019, while predicting a slowdown of the economy. He described the need for endurance for the economy during the COVID-19 pandemic in Bangladesh. In September 2020, he said the economy was recovering. He recommended the usage of monetary policy to control inflation. He has spoken critically about S. Alam Group buying banks using loans from their existing banks and accused the conglomerate of having "siphoned off" $10 billion from the banking system. The conglomerate's founder sent a notice of dispute to the interim government alleging the government's actions have violated its investors' rights under international treaties and threatened international arbitration if no agreement between the parties is reached. Mansur has called for reforms in the financial sector to reduce loan defaults. In 2023, he said the economic shock in Bangladesh was also the result of government inaction and not entirely based on external factors.

Mansur was appointed Governor of the Bank of Bangladesh on 14 August 2024 by Chief Adviser and Nobel Laureate Muhammad Yunus, pledging to tackle supposed money laundering in the country. To allow Mansur, aged 72, to be appointed for the position, the Financial Institutions Division (FID) of the Finance Ministry amended the law, which had limited the age of an appointee to 67. The interim government and President Mohammed Shahabuddin approved of the change. Since his appointment, he has accused the former government of allowing $17 billion to be embezzled.

In October 2024, United States District Court for the District of Columbia judge Carl J. Nichols issued an arrest warrant for Mansur whilst he was attending an IMF forum in Washington, D.C. He had been called to testify regarding $31.9 million in arbitration awarded against Bangladesh, but the warrant was eventually stayed.

Since his appointment, Mansur has faced criticism for his "direct and unfiltered public statements" about Bangladesh's banking industry. Mansur's comments have repeatedly cast doubt on the survival of some financial institutions and have been described as "counterproductive" by National Bank Chairman Abdul Awal Mintoo.

In June 2025, reports revealed that Mansur faced several allegations of improper conduct, including a "conflict of interest and regulatory overreach" in connection with his handling of actions taken against mobile financial service provider Nagad, where concerns about regulatory neutrality and procurement protocols were raised by those in Bangladesh's fintech sector.

In response to allegations that he used his position to purchase a Tk45 crore property in Dubai for his daughter Mehreen Sarah Mansur, Mansur insisted he had no involvement and that the property was purchased before he became governor. Mansur claimed his name, which appears on the property documents, was in relation to him being the father of Mehreen and not the purchase of the property.
