= Girish Chandra Roy =

British Indian aristocrat and philanthropist

Raja Girish Chandra Roy
- গিরীশচন্দ্র রায়
- Pronunciation: Girīś Chôndrô Ray
- Born: Bajragovinda Nandi Chaudhury; 27 March 1844; Charbhuta, Balaganj, Sylhet District, British India
- Died: 15 April 1907 (aged 63); Sylhet, British Raj

Raja Girish Chandra Roy (Bengali: গিরীশ চন্দ্র রায়; 27 March 1844 – 15 April 1907), born as Bajragovinda Nandi Chaudhury (Bengali: ব্রজগোবিন্দ নন্দী চৌধুরী) was a British Indian aristocrat and philanthropist. In recognition of his contribution to the development of education in Sylhet, he became the first Sylheti to be awarded the title of Rai Bahadur in 1895 and the only Sylheti be granted the title of Raja by the British Raj.

== Early life and rise to power ==
Bajragovinda Nandi Chaudhury was born on 27 March 1844 to a Bengali (Sylheti) Kayastha family in the village of Charbhuta in Balaganj, Sylhet. He was the son of Dipachandra Nandi Chaudhury. In 1849, he was adopted and raised by Bajrasundari Devi, the childless daughter of zamindar Murari Chand Roy of Sylhet. Thus he inherited the vast property of the zamindari of Sylhet.

== Career ==
As a zamindar, he spent all his wealth for the spread of education, the prevention of famine, the salvation of the poor and the distressed. Govinda Charan Park was established by Roy. He was the first Sylheti engineer and one of the architects of the Howrah Bridge in Calcutta.

He founded the Girish Bengal School (Raja Girish Chandra High School) in 1876. After the death of Radha Nath Chaudhuri in 1881, Roy took over the Sylhet National School and established the Murari Chand College in honour of his adoptive grandfather in the Bandarbazar area of Sylhet town. This was the first college in Sylhet and Assam Province. He was also the founder of Murari Chand Entrance School and Sanskrit Chatuspathi, where all the four Vedas were taught. During his time, about half of the students of these schools and colleges studied for free and with low salary, a monthly stipend was fixed for the helpless students. Roy was also very supportive of women's education and helped in its spread in many ways. Moreover, Raja Girish Chandra Roy was the first among all of the Bengalis in the then Assam Province to prepare tea gardens and opened the way for others to indulge in this business. In 1905, he was awarded the title of Raja during the visit of Sir Henry Cotton to Sylhet. The Raja loved to feed people, and at feasts in his house he always stood casually near the line, observing and greeting, and everyone was pleased with his humble behaviour and sweet talk. He did not hesitate to give a lot of money whether it was Hindus, Muslims or Christians.

== Death and legacy ==
Roy died on Sunday 2nd Boishakh 1314 [Bangla] (15 April 1907) in Sylhet. On hearing the news of the Raja's death, the Deputy Commissioner, Mr. Cohen, closed the Deputy Commissioner Offices, Local Board Offices, Judges' Courts, All Judges' Courts, Munsiff Courts, Government Schools in Sylhet. The moneylenders of Bandar Bazar closed their respective shops on for that day. Murari Chand College High School was closed for seven days. The city was silent and silent, and everyone lamented, "What has happened?" The Raja's funeral was completed in due course. In 2023, a portrait of Roy was revealed on campus.
