= The Foreign Exchange Regulation Act, 1947 (Bangladesh) =

The Foreign Exchange Regulation Act, 1947 (known as FERA) is a law enacted and was officially published by the government of Pakistan and still applicable in Bangladesh, which was East Pakistan before independence, to regulate certain payments, dealings in foreign exchange and securities, and the import and export of currency and bullion.

== Purpose and scope ==
FERA was primarily aimed at conserving foreign exchange reserves, which were scarce in the post-independence and post-partition era. It granted the government and the Bangladesh Bank extensive powers to control transactions involving foreign exchange. The Act imposed restrictions on various activities like: Dealing in foreign exchange by unauthorized persons Payments to or receipts from non-residents Import and export of currency and bullion Acquisition and holding of foreign securities Opening and maintaining foreign currency accounts

== Key provisions ==
Authorized Dealers: FERA designated certain banks and financial institutions as "authorized dealers" who were permitted to deal in foreign exchange under the regulations of the Act.

Restrictions on Dealing: Except with the permission of the Bangladesh Bank, no person other than an authorized dealer could buy, sell, borrow, or lend foreign exchange.

Payment Restrictions: The Act imposed restrictions on payments to non-residents and required prior approval for certain types of remittances.

Import and Export Restrictions: It regulated the import and export of currency and bullion, requiring declarations and licenses for such transactions.

Blocked Accounts: FERA allowed for the creation of "blocked accounts" for non-residents, limiting their ability to freely repatriate funds.

Acquisition of Foreign Exchange: The government had the power to acquire foreign exchange from residents under specific circumstances.

== Amendments and continuation ==
FERA was amended several times over the years to adapt to changing economic conditions. It was made friendlier by the Foreign Exchange Regulation Act (Amendment) 2015, FERA continues to be the governing legislation for foreign exchange transactions in Bangladesh.

== Guideline from Bangladesh Bank ==
For ease of implementation of the provisions of the Act 1947, the central bank has published a guide entitled "Guidelines for Foreign Exchange Transactions" which ultimately replaces the 1986 Exchange Control Manual, providing comprehensive instructions for Authorized Dealers and their clients in foreign exchange transactions.

This publication consists of two volumes:

Volume I: Details instructions and forms for individual transactions.

Volume II: Outlines the reporting procedures for Authorized Dealers to Bangladesh Bank, including formats for monthly returns and statements.

This first edition includes instructions valid as of December 31, 1996, and should be referenced alongside any subsequent FE Circulars or Circular Letters.

== Impact and criticism ==
FERA played a crucial role in managing Bangladesh's foreign exchange reserves during the early years of independence. However, it has been criticized for being overly restrictive and creating a cumbersome bureaucratic system. The Act is seen by some as hindering foreign investment and trade due to its stringent regulations.
