= Bangladesh Institute of Governance and Management =

Government training institute in Dhaka

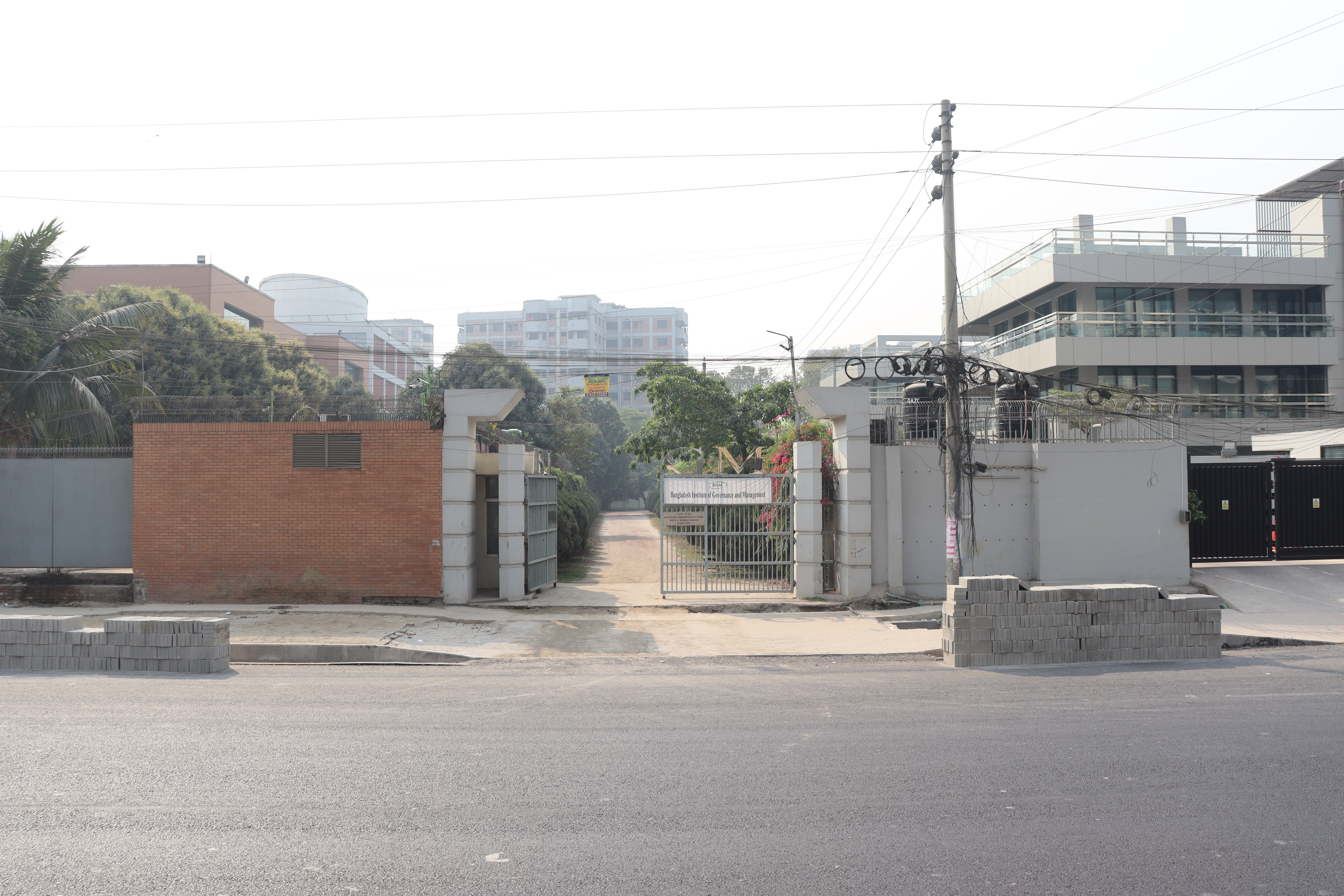
- Formation: 2006
- Headquarters: Dhaka, Bangladesh
- Region served: Bangladesh
- Official language: Bengali
- Website: bigm.edu.bd

The Bangladesh Institute of Governance and Management (Bengali: বাংলাদেশ ইনস্টিটিউট অব গভর্নেন্স অ্যান্ড ম্যানেজমেন্ট) is a research and training institute for government and private officers providing post-graduate degrees. It is governed by a Board of Trustees led by Mohammed Matiul Islam, chairperson of the institute. Mohammad Tareque is the director of the institute.

== History ==
Bangladesh Institute of Governance and Management was established in 2006. It was originally called the Civil Service College, Dhaka. The institute offers Masters in Public Affairs. Majors in the institute are governance and public policy, human resource management, and international economic relations. The institute moved from the BIAM Foundation to a permanent campus at Agargaon, Dhaka.

Bangladesh Institute of Governance and Management carries out research and studies on topics relevant to Bangladesh. It carried out research on the COVID-19 pandemic in Bangladesh and its impact on working women.
