= Ibn Sina Trust =

Nonprofit institution in Bangladesh

- Company type: Trust
- Founded: 1980; 46 years ago
- Founder: Advocate Mujibur Rahman
- Headquarters: Dhanmondi, Dhaka, Bangladesh
- Key people: Choudhury Mahmood Hasan (Chairman)
- Services: Complete health care services
- Revenue: 50 Million taka
- Number of employees: 10,000+
- Website: ibnsinatrust.com

Ibn Sina Trust is a non-profit welfare trust (organization) in Bangladesh and a major healthcare provider.

== History ==
The Ibn Sina Trust was founded on 30 June 1980 in collaboration with the then Saudi Government. The then ambassador of Saudi Arabia in Bangladesh- his excellence Fouad Al Khatib and Advocate Mujibur Rahman, a Senior Advocate of Bangladesh Supreme Court and past provincial Information Minister of East Pakistan before the birth of Bangladesh, were two pioneer contributors in setting up the trust in Bangladesh. Ibn Sina Trust founded several laboratories, hospitals, diagnostic centers, consultation centers, and pharmaceutical industries throughout Bangladesh. On 30 April 2018, the Trust sold its shares in Islami Bank Bangladesh following a reshuffle of the bank administration. Ibn Sina has the biggest branch in Kallayanpur which serves at least 1,000 people per day.

== Units ==
The Ibn Sina Trust has the following organizations:

- Sina Pharmaceutical Industry
- Ibn Sina Diagnostic & Imaging Center, Dhanmondi
- Ibn Sina Specialized Hospital Dhanmondi
- Ibn Sina Medical Imaging Center, Zigatola
- IBN SINA Medical College Hospital, Kallyanpur
- Ibn Sina Nursing Institute, Kallyanpur
- Ibn Sina D.Lab & Consultation Center, Doyagonj
- Ibn Sina Diagnostic & Consultation Center, Badda
- Ibn Sina Diagnostic & Consultation Center, Uttara
- Ibn Sina Diagnostic Center Lalbagh Ltd
- Ibn Sina Diagnostic & Consultation Center, Jessore
- Ibn Sina Diagnostic & Consultation Center Bogra
- Ibn Sina Diagnostic & Consultation Center, Malibag
- Ibn Sina Diagnostic & Consultation Center, Savar
- Ibn Sina Diagnostic & Consultation Center, Mirpur
- Ibn Sina Hospital & Diagnostic Center, Noakhali
- Ibn Sina Hospital Sylhet ltd
