= Mohammad Abdur Razzaque (economist) =

British-Bangladeshi economist and the chairman (born 1970)

Mohammad Abdur Razzaque is a British-Bangladeshi economist and the chairman of the Research and Policy Integration for Development (RAPID). He is the former head of International Trade Policy at the Commonwealth Secretariat. He was a faculty member of the Department of Economics at the University of Dhaka. He is a director of Policy Research Institute.

== Early life ==
Razzaque was born in May 1970. He has a PhD from the University of Sussex.

== Career ==
From 1995 to 1997, Razzaque worked at the Centre for Policy Dialogue. He was a lecturer of the Department of Economics at the University of Dhaka.

Razzaque worked at the Commonwealth Secretariat from 2007 to 2017. He was the head of International Trade Policy at the Commonwealth Secretariat. He has spoken at the House of Lords and the House of Commons Committees. He has worked for the Economic Research and Regional Cooperation Department of the World Bank.

Razzaque is the editor of the magazine Policy Insights. He is a director of United Kingdom-based International Economics Consulting Limited. He is a director of Policy Research Institute.

== Bibliography ==
- Navigating New Waters: Unleashing Bangladesh's Export Potential for Smooth LDC Graduation
