= List of governors of the Bangladesh Bank =

Governor of Bangladesh Bank
- Monogram of Bangladesh Bank
- Incumbent; Md Mostaqur Rahman since 25 February 2026
- Bangladesh Bank
- Type: Chief executive officer
- Reports to: Minister of Finance
- Seat: Bangladesh Bank Building
- Appointer: Prime minister On the advice of the Finance Minister
- Term length: Three years or at the discretion of the Prime Minister
- Constituting instrument: Bangladesh Bank Order, 1972
- Formation: 18 January 1972; 54 years ago
- First holder: A. N. M. Hamidullah
- Deputy: Deputy Governor
- Salary: ৳157500 (US$1,300); Per month (including allowances)
- Website: www.bb.org.bd

The Bangladesh Bank is the central bank of Bangladesh. Its governor is the chief executive officer of the organization. The 13th governor was Ahsan H. Mansur who was removed due to mob created by the employees. The new governor is Md Mostaqur Rahman.

== Governors list ==
No.	Name (birth–death)	Portrait	Start of Term	End of Term	Length of Term	Ref.
1	A. N. M. Hamidullah (1919 – 1994)		18 January 1972	18 November 1974	2 years, 304 days	
2	A. K. Naziruddin Ahmed (1931 – 2016)		19 November 1974	13 July 1976	1 year, 237 days	
3	Mohammad Nurul Islam (1924 2007)		13 July 1976	12 April 1987	10 years, 273 days	
4	Shegufta Bakht Chaudhuri (1931 – 2020)		12 April 1987	19 December 1992	5 years, 251 days	
5	Khorshed Alam (1935 – 2021)		20 December 1992	21 November 1996	3 years, 337 days	
6	Lutfar Rahman Sarkar (1930 – 2013)		21 November 1996	21 November 1998	2 years, 0 days	
7	Mohammed Farashuddin (born 1942)		24 November 1998	22 November 2001	2 years, 363 days	
8	Dr. Fakhruddin Ahmed (born 1940)		29 November 2001	30 April 2005	3 years, 152 days	
9	Salehuddin Ahmed (born 1949)		1 May 2005	30 April 2009	3 years, 364 days	
10	Dr. Atiur Rahman (born 1951)		1 May 2009	15 March 2016	6 years, 319 days	
11	Fazle Kabir (born 1955)		16 March 2016	3 July 2022	6 years, 109 days	
12	Abdur Rouf Talukder (born 1964)		4 July 2022	9 August 2024	2 years, 36 days	
Acting	Nurun Nahar (born 1965)		11 August 2024	13 August 2024	2 days	
13	Ahsan Habib Mansur (born 1950/51)		13 August 2024	25 February 2026	1 year, 196 days	
14	Md Mostaqur Rahman		25 February 2026	Incumbent	194 days	
