= Dhaka Bank =

Private Bank in Bangladesh

Dhaka Bank PLC
- Company type: Public Limited Company
- Traded as: DSE: DHAKABANK; CSE: DHAKABANK
- Industry: Banking; Financial services
- Founded: July 5, 1995; 30 years ago
- Founder: Mirza Abbas
- Headquarters: Dhaka, Bangladesh
- Number of locations: 82
- Area served: Bangladesh & overseas
- Key people: Abdul Hai Sarker (Chairman); Osman Ershad Faiz (Managing Director & CEO)
- Products: Banking services, ATM/CRM services, Internet Banking, Payment Gateway, Mobile Banking, Consumer Banking; Corporate Banking; Investment Banking; Foreign Exchange Banking
- Operating income: ▼US$149 million (2024)
- Net income: ▼US$10.5 million (2024)
- Total assets: ▲US$3.5 billion (2024)
- Number of employees: 2,070 (2022)
- Website: dhakabank.com.bd

Dhaka Bank PLC is a private limited commercial bank in Bangladesh. Its headquarters are situated in Dhaka. The bank has 116 branches and multiple SME service centers around the country.

== History ==
The bank was founded in 1995 by Bangladeshi politician Mirza Abbas. The founder chairman of the board of directors of this bank is Abdul Hai Sarker.

In July 2009, Altaf Hossain Sarker was re-elected chairman of Dhaka Bank Limited.

Reshadur Rahman Shaheen was elected chairman of Dhaka Bank Limited in April 2010.

Bangladesh Bank refused to approve the reappointment of Mirza Abbas as director of Dhaka Bank in September 2015 after being absent in 11 out of 12 board meetings. The Bangladesh Nationalist Party described his removal from the board as political vendetta by the government. On 11 November, Syed Mahbubur Rahman was appointed managing director of Dhaka Bank Limited. Reshadur Rahman was elected chairman of Dhaka Bank Limited.

In March 2017, Dhaka Bank signed an agreement with International Finance Corporation to receive US$55 million loan.

The Anti-Corruption Commission arrested an official of Dhaka Bank Limited from Feni District for embezzling 78 million BDT from the bank in April 2019. He admitted to embezzling 55 million BDT from the bank.

In August 2020, Abdullah Al Ahsan was appointed vice-chairman of Dhaka Bank Limited. Abdul Hai Sarker was elected chairman of the board. The Bangladesh High Court denied bail to a former VP of the bank on accusations of embezzling 220 million BDT from the bank.

Two officials of the bank were detained for misappropriating 37.7 million BDT from Dhaka Bank. Abdul Hai Sarker was re-elected chairman of Dhaka Bank Limited in July 2021.

Dhaka Bank arranged a 5.2 billion BDT syndicated loan for Chandpur Power Generations Limited of Doreen Group. It also US$40 million for the powerplant from banks in Germany. In April it signed an agreement with Canadian University of Bangladesh. In October 2022, Dhaka Bank received an award from JP Morgan. It raised 9 billion BDT syndicated loan for Bashundhara Oil and Gas Company Limited of Bashundhara Group.

== Awards ==
In SME Banking Award 2014, Dhaka Bank was awarded the best manufacturing-friendly bank.

== See also ==
- List of banks in Bangladesh
