= Bangladesh Electronic Funds Transfer Network =

Bangladesh Electronic Fund Transfer Network (BEFTN) is a Bangladeshi electronic fund transfer network between banks within Bangladesh. Its main purpose is to transfer funds between bank accounts. The network can settle debit and credits. Salary, bill, dividend, interest could be paid through the system.

== History ==
The network was established in 2011 (15 years ago).

From November 2023, fund transfer of Bangladesh Automated Clearing House (BACH) was to be accomplished through Nikash-BEFTN.
