= Wahidul Haq =

Bangladeshi politician (c.1933–2020)

Wahidul Haque
- ওয়াহিদুল হক

Minister of Finance
- In office January 1988 – May 1988
- In office September 1988 – May 1990

Personal details
- Born: c. 1933 Lakshmipur, Bengal Presidency, British India
- Died: July 3, 2020 (aged 87) Toronto, Canada
- Education: Stanford University; University of Dhaka

Wahidul Haque (c. 1933 – 3 July 2020) was the Finance Minister of Bangladesh. He was also an emeritus professor at the University of Toronto, Canada.

== Career ==
Haq completed his master's degree at University of Dhaka in 1955 and did his PhD at Stanford University in California, USA. He was professor of economics at Islamabad University in 1969. He has taught at Dhaka University. He then taught at the University of California, Berkeley for a while, then joined the University of Toronto as a professor and settled there permanently. He was the finance minister during Ershad's rule from September 1988 to May 1990.

== Death ==
Wahidul Haq died on 3 July 2020.
