= Uttara Bank PLC. =

Commercial bank in Bangladesh

- Type: Private (Non-Government)
- Traded as: DSE: UTTARABANK
- Industry: Banking
- Predecessor: Eastern Banking Corporation Limited (1965 – 1971)
- Founded: 1965; 61 years ago 1972; 54 years ago (as Uttara Bank)
- Headquarters: 90 Motijheel, Dhaka, Bangladesh
- Key people: Azharul Islam (chairman); Iftekharul Islam (vice-chair); Md. Abul Hashem (managing director & CEO)
- Products: General Banking; Retail Banking; Consumer Banking; Corporate Banking; Investment Banking; SME Banking
- Net income: ▲ ৳222 crore (US$18 million)
- Number of employees: 4000 persons
- Website: www.uttarabank-bd.com

Uttara Bank PLC. is one of the largest and oldest private sector commercial banks in Bangladesh. There are 243 branches at home and 600 affiliates worldwide. Azharul Islam, chairman of Aftab Group, is the chairman of Uttara Bank PLC.

== History ==
Uttara Bank PLC. (UBPLC) was established in 1965 with the head office located at Motijheel in Dhaka, East Pakistan as a scheduled bank of the Eastern Banking Corporation. After the independence of Bangladesh following the Bangladesh Liberation War, the bank was nationalised under Bangladesh Banks (Nationalisation) Order 1972 and renamed Uttara Bank.

On 15 September 1983, Uttara Bank became a private limited bank. It is listed on the Chittagong Stock Exchange and Dhaka Stock Exchange.

On 23 December 2003, Md Mahfuzus Subhan, a retired cadre of East Pakistan Civil Service, was appointed chairman of Uttara Bank PLC.

In April 2007, Uttara Bank PLC. was part of a syndicate led by Dhaka Bank and composed of Premier Bank Limited and AB Bank to provide a 680 million BDT loan to Capital Board Mills Limited, a subsidiary of Capital Paper and Pulp Industries Limited.

In 2008, following instructions of Bangladesh Securities and Exchange Commission Uttara Bank PLC. appointed independent directors.

Two bank officials including a branch manager and two businessmen were sentenced to life imprisonment for embezzlement of 40 million BDT in April 2016. In 2026, Md. Abul Hashem was appointed CEO and managing director of Uttara Bank PLC.

In 2019, Uttara Bank PLC. provided a 7 per cent cash dividend and 23 per cent stock dividend.

Uttara Bank PLC. saw profits decline 26 per cent from July to September 2022. Iftekharul Islam, managing director of Aftab Group, was elected vice-chairman of Uttara Bank PLC. The bank opened its 244th branch at Teknaf, Coxʹs Bazar District.

== Operations ==
Uttara Bank PLC. has 245 branches and 28 sub-branches in Bangladesh. The bank's internal and external operational activities is operated by twelve zones in different regions of the country. It operates through a number of online branches and authorized dealer branches. It is also affiliated with nearly 600 financial institutions worldwide. The Board of Directors consists of 15 members. The Head Office is located at Bank's own 18-storied building at 90, Motijheel C/A, the commercial center of the capital, Dhaka.

Despite the recent crisis in the Bangladeshi banking sector, Uttara Bank is maintaining a decent financial health. Bonik Barta, a financial daily newspaper has declared this bank as one of the strongest banks of Bangladesh based on seven indices.
