= Bangladesh Bank =

Central bank of Bangladesh

Bangladesh Bank বাংলাদেশ ব্যাংক
- Bangladesh Bank Monogram

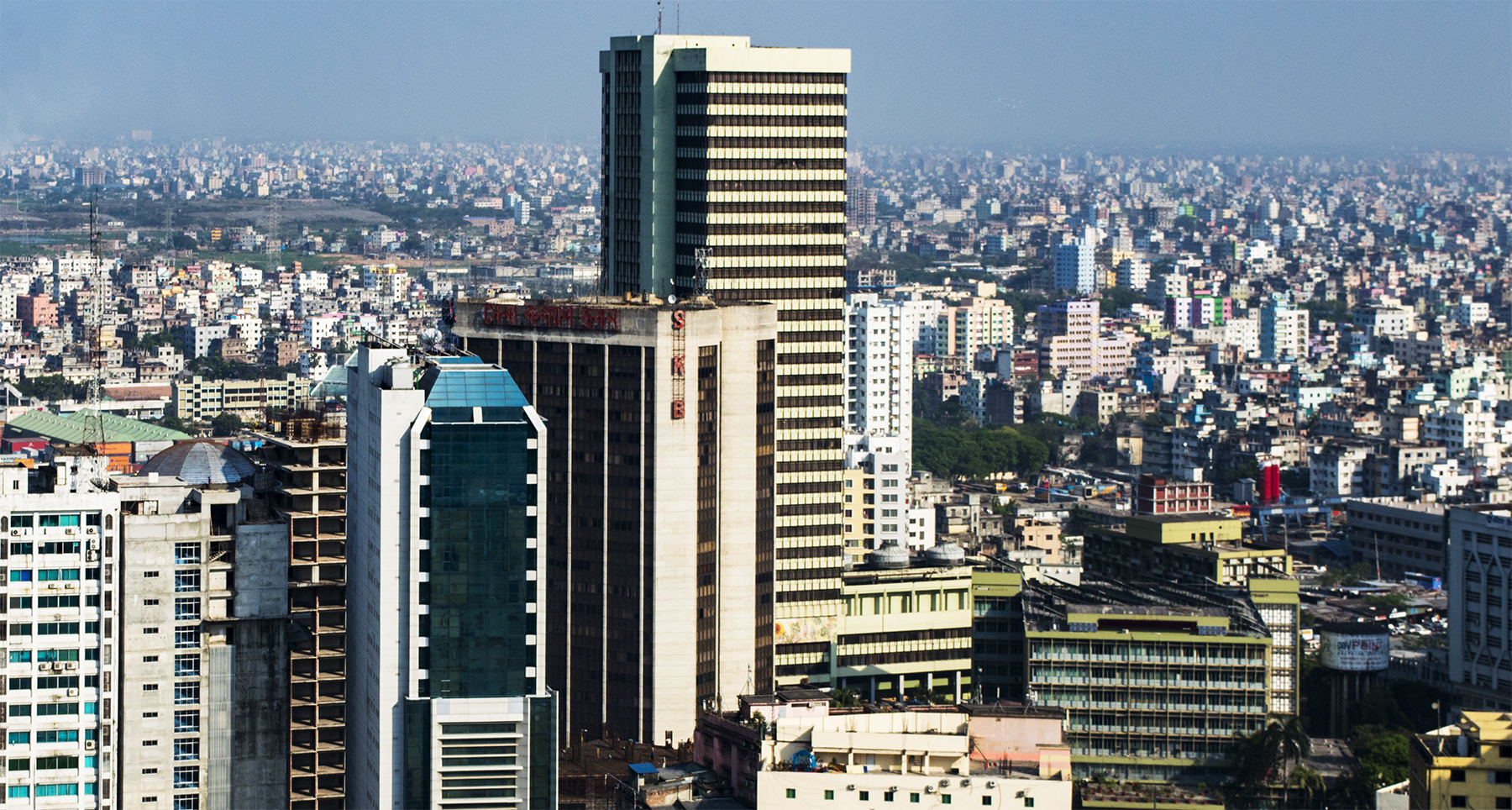
- Bangladesh Bank Building in Motijheel commercial area, Dhaka
- Central bank of: Bangladesh
- Headquarters: Bangladesh Bank Building, Motijheel, Dhaka
- Coordinates: 23.7266°N 90.4232°E
- Established: 16 December 1971 (54 years ago) (de jure) (Note: The bank considers its founding date to be the Victory Day of Bangladesh on 16 December 1971. But in reality, the bank wasn't officially reorganised until 7 April 1972.)
- Ownership: 100% state ownership
- Governor: Md Mostaqur Rahman
- Key people: Nurun Nahar; (Deputy Governor); Md. Habibur Rahman; (Deputy Governor); Md. Zakir Hossain Chowdhury; (Deputy Governor); Md. Kabir Ahmed; (Deputy Governor)
- Currency: Taka (৳); BDT (ISO 4217)
- Reserves: ▲ ৳3900 billion (US$32 billion) (October 2025)
- Bank rate: ▲10.00%; (27 October 2024)
- Interest rate target: ▲10.00%; (27 October 2024)
- Preceded by: State Bank of Pakistan
- Website: www.bb.org.bd
- Bangladesh Bank

Agency overview
- Jurisdiction: Government of Bangladesh
- Key document: Bangladesh Bank Order, 1972
- reserves data up to month of Aug 2015. source: "Bangladesh's forex reserves cross record $26 billion mark". bdnews24.com. 17 August 2015.

Bangladesh Bank (BB; Bengali: বাংলাদেশ ব্যাংক, romanized: Bāṅlādēś Byāṅk) is the central bank of Bangladesh. Bangladesh Bank is the principal monetary authority of the country and is responsible for issuing currency, formulating and implementing monetary policy, and maintaining price and financial stability. It is a member of the Asian Clearing Union and is fully owned by the government of Bangladesh.

The bank is active in developing green banking and a financial inclusion policy, and is an important member of the Alliance for Financial Inclusion. Bangladesh Financial Intelligence Unit (BFIU), a department of Bangladesh Bank, is a member FIU of the Egmont Group of Financial Intelligence Units.

Bangladesh Bank is the first central bank in the world to introduce a dedicated hotline (16236) for people to complain about any banking-related problem. Moreover, the organization is the first central bank in the world to issue a "Green Banking Policy". To acknowledge this contribution, then-governor Atiur Rahman was given the title 'Green Governor' at the 2012 United Nations Climate Change Conference, which was held at the Qatar National Convention Centre in Doha.

== History ==
On 7 April 1972, after the Bangladesh Liberation War and the eventual independence of Bangladesh, the Government of Bangladesh passed the Bangladesh Bank Order (P.O. No. 127 of 1972) reorganising the Dhaka branch of the State Bank of Pakistan as Bangladesh Bank, the country's central bank and apex regulatory body for the country's monetary and financial system.

The 1972 Mujib government pursued a pro-socialist agenda. In 1972, the government decided to nationalise all banks to channel funds to the public sector and to prioritise credit to those sectors that sought to reconstruct the war-torn country – mainly industry and agriculture. However, government control of the wrong sectors prevented these banks from functioning well. This was compounded by the fact that loans were handed out to the public sector without commercial considerations; banks had poor capital lease, provided poor customer service, and lacked all market-based monetary instruments. Because loans were given out without commercial considerations (and also took a long time to call a non-performing loan), recovery under the erstwhile judicial system was so expensive that loan recovery was abysmally poor. While the government made a point of intervening everywhere, it did not set up a proper regulatory system to diagnose such problems and correct them. Hence, banking concepts like profitability and liquidity were alien to bank managers, and capital adequacy took a backseat.

In 1982, the first reform program was initiated, wherein the government denationalised two of the six nationalised commercial banks and permitted private local banks to compete in the banking sector. In 1986, a National Commission on Money, Banking and Credit was appointed to deal with the problems of the banking sector and several steps were taken for the recovery targets of the nationalised commercial banks and development financial institutions (as well as prohibiting defaulters from getting new loans). Still, the efficiency of the banking sector could not be improved.

The Financial Sector Adjustment Credit (FSAC) and the Financial Sector Reform Programme (FSRP) were formed in 1990, upon contracts with the World Bank. These programs sought to remove government distortions and lessen the financial repression. Policies made use of the McKinnon-Shaw hypothesis, which stated that removing distortions augments efficiency in the credit market and increases competition. They involved banks providing loans on a commercial basis, enhancing bank efficiency and limiting government control to monetary policy only. The FSRP forced banks to have a minimum capital adequacy, to systematically classify loans and to implement modern computerised systems, including those that handle accounting. It forced the central bank to free up interest rates, revise financial laws and increase supervision in the credit market. The government also developed the capital market, which was also performing poorly.

The FSRP became defunct in 1996. Afterwards, the Government of Bangladesh formed a Bank Reform Committee (BRC), whose recommendations were largely unaddressed by the then-government.

Currently, it has ten offices located in Motijheel, Sadarghat, Chittagong, Khulna, Bogra, Rajshahi, Sylhet, Barisal, Rangpur, and Mymensingh in Bangladesh; total manpower stands at 5807 (officials 3981, subordinate staff 1826) as of 31 March 2015.

== Branch offices ==
1. Motijheel
2. Sadarghat
3. Bogra
4. Chittagong
5. Rajshahi
6. Barisal
7. Khulna
8. Sylhet
9. Rangpur
10. Mymensingh

== Functions ==
Bangladesh Bank performs all the functions that a central bank in any country is expected to perform. Such functions include maintaining price stability through economic and monetary policy measures, managing the country's foreign exchange and gold reserve, and regulating the banking sector of the country. Like all other central banks, Bangladesh Bank is both the government's banker and the banker's bank, a "lender of last resort". Bangladesh Bank, like most other central banks, exercises a monopoly over the issue of currency and banknotes (except for the one, two, and five taka notes and coins, which are the responsibility of the Ministry of Finance of the Government of Bangladesh). The major functional areas include:

- Formulation and implementation of monetary and credit policies
- Regulation and supervision of banks and non-bank financial institutions, promotion and development of domestic financial markets
- Management of the country's international reserves
- Issuance of currency notes
- Regulation and supervision of the payment system
- Acting as banker to the government
- Money laundering prevention
- Collection and furnishing of credit information
- Implementation of the Foreign Exchange Regulation Act
- Managing a deposit insurance scheme

== Organisation ==
The bank's highest official is the governor. His seat is in Motijheel, Dhaka. The governor chairs the board of directors. The executive staff, also headed by the governor, is responsible for the bank's day-to-day affairs.

Bangladesh Bank also has a number of departments under it, namely Debt Management, Law, and so on, each headed by one or more general managers. The bank has 10 physical branches: Mymensingh, Motijheel, Sadarghat, Barisal, Khulna, Sylhet, Bogra, Rajshahi, Rangpur, and Chittagong; each is headed by an executive director. Headquarters are located in the Bangladesh Bank Building in Motijheel, which has two general managers.

=== Hierarchy ===
The executive staff is responsible for daily affairs and includes the governor and four deputy governors. Under the governors, there are executive directors and an economic advisor.

The directors of the departments come under the executive directors and are not part of the executive staff.

Since its conception, the Bangladesh Bank has had 13 governors. Ahsan H Mansur is the incumbent governor of the bank since 2024. The four current deputy governors are:

- Nurun Nahar,
- Md. Habibur Rahman,
- Md. Zakir Hossain Chowdhury and
- Md. Kabir Ahmed

=== Board of directors ===
The general supervision and direction of the bank's affairs and business are entrusted to a board of directors. This board can exercise all powers and perform all acts on behalf of the bank.

Composition of the board:

- The governor
- A deputy governor nominated by the government
- Four non-governmental directors, nominated by the government, with experience and capacity in banking, trade, commerce, industry, or agriculture
- Three government officials, nominated by the government

== Publications ==
Bangladesh Bank publishes a range of periodical publications, research papers, and reports that contain monetary and banking developments, economic reviews, and various other statistical data. These include:

- Annual Report
- Bangladesh Bank Quarterly
- Monetary Policy Review
- CSR Initiatives in Banks
- BBTA Journal: Thoughts on Banking and Finance
- Annual Report on Green Banking
- Import Payments
- Financial Stability Assessment Report

== Awards ==
The Bangladesh Bank Award was introduced in 2000. The winners are:

1. Rehman Sobhan (2000)
2. Nurul Islam (2009)
3. Mosharraf Hossain (2011)
4. Muzaffar Ahmed and Swadesh Ranjan Bose (2013)
5. Azizur Rahman Khan and Mahbub Hossain (2017)
6. Wahiduddin Mahmud (2020)

== See also ==
- Bangladesh Bank Taka Museum
- Bangladesh Bank robbery
- The Foreign Exchange Regulation Act, 1947 (Bangladesh)
- The Security Printing Corporation (Bangladesh) Ltd.
- List of financial supervisory authorities by country
