= Union councils of Magura District =

Union councils of Magura District (Bengali: মাগুরা জেলার ইউনিয়ন পরিষদসমূহ) are the smallest rural administrative and local government units in Magura District of Bangladesh. The district consists of 1 municipalities, 4 upazilas, 36 union porishods, mouza 537 and 730 villages.

== Magura Sadar Upazila ==
Magura Sadar Upazila is divided into Magura Municipality and 13 union parishads.The union parishads are subdivided into 222 mauzas and 241 villages. Magura Municipality is subdivided into 9 wards and 61 mahallas.

- Atharokhada Union
- Baroil Polita Union
- Bogia Union
- Chawlia Union
- Gopalgram Union
- Hazipur Union
- Hazrapur Union
- Jagdal Union
- Kosundi Union
- Kuchiamora Union
- Moghi Union
- Raghobdair Union
- Satrijitpur Union

== Mohammadpur Upazila ==
Mohammadpur Upazila is divided into eight union parishads. The union parishads are subdivided into 131 mauzas and 188 villages.

- Babukhali Union
- Balidia Union
- Binodpur Union
- Digha Union
- Mohammadpur Union
- Nohata Union
- Palashbaria Union
- Rajapur Union

== Shalikha Upazila ==
Shalikha Upazila is divided into seven union parishads. The union parishads are subdivided into 100 mauzas and 118 villages.

- Arpara Union
- Bunagati Union
- Dhaneswargati Union
- Gongarampur Union
- Shalikha Union
- Shatakhali Union
- Talkhari Union

== Sreepur Upazila ==
Sreepur Upazila is divided into eight union parishads. The union parishads are subdivided into 83 mauzas and 164 villages.

- Amalsar Union
- Dariapur Union
- Gayeshpur Union
- Kadirpara Union
- Nakol Union
- Shobdalpur Union
- Sreekol Union
- Sreepur Union
