= Magura, Bangladesh =

City in western Bangladesh

Magura মাগুরা
- City & Municipality
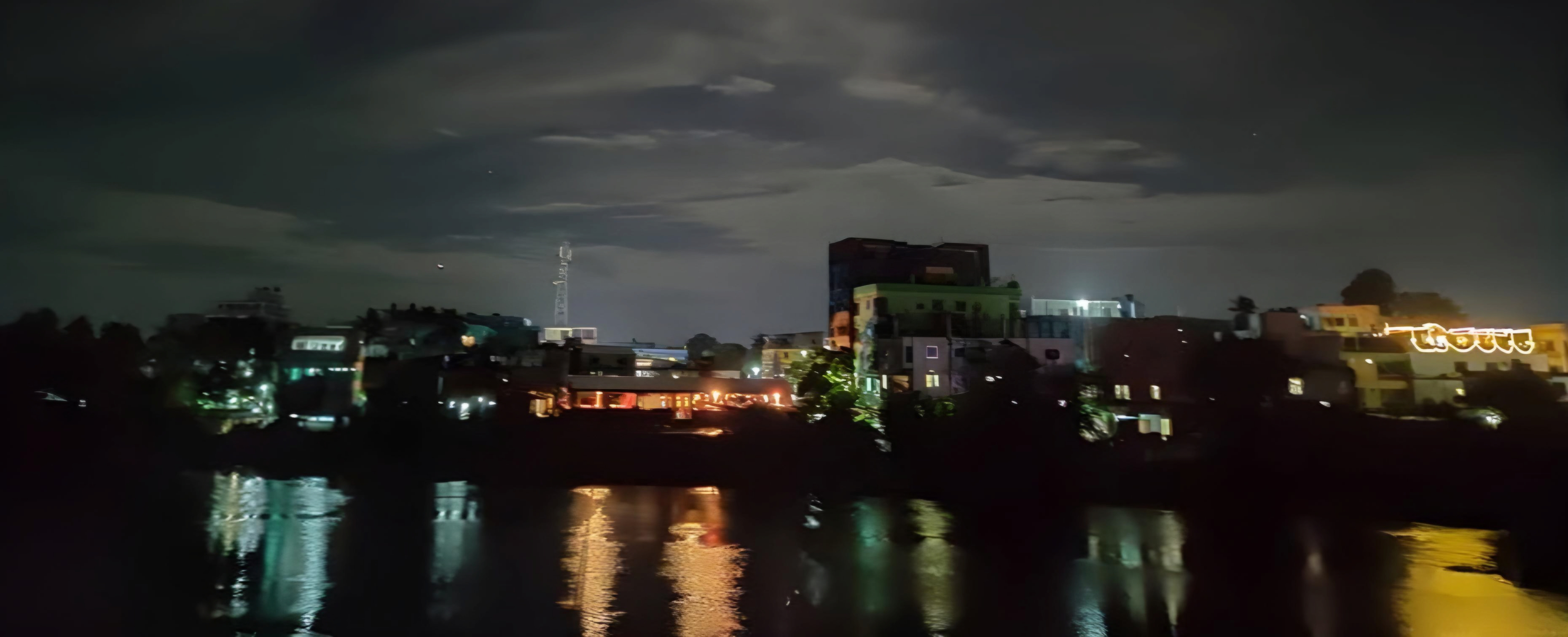
- Night view of Magura city from Nabaganga River

- Location in Bangladesh Magura (Bangladesh)
- Coordinates: 23.4854655°N 89.4198305°E
- Country: Bangladesh
- Division: Khulna
- District: Magura
- Upazila: Magura Sadar
- Town Committee: 1965 (61 years ago)
- Municipality: 1972 (54 years ago)

Government
  - Type: Mayor-Council
  - Body: Magura Municipality
  - Mayor: Khurshid Haider Tutul

Area
  - City & Municipality: 44.36 km^{2} (17.13 sq mi)
- Elevation: 12.19 m (40.0 ft)

Population (2022)
  - City & Municipality: 114,249
  - Density: 2,575/km^{2} (6,671/sq mi)
  - Metro: 380,107
- Time zone: UTC+6 (BST)
- Postal Code: 7600
- IDD : Calling Code: +880 (0)611
- Languages: Standard Bengali (Official)
- Police: Bangladesh Police
- Website: www.magurapaurashava.gov.bd

Magura (Bengali: মাগুরা, romanized: māgurā) is a city located on the banks of the Nabaganga River in south-western Bangladesh. Magura is the headquarters of Magura Sadar Upazila and Magura District.

== Population ==
Religions in Magura Paurashava (2022)
Religion	Percent
Islam	85.46%
Hinduism	14.42%
Other or not stated	0.12%

According to the 2022 Bangladesh census, Magura Paurashava had 28,733 households and a population of 114,249. Magura had a literacy rate of 82.60%: 84.86% for males and 80.33% for females, and a sex ratio of 100.11 males per 100 females. 8.41% of the population was under 5 years of age.

According to the 2011 Bangladeshi census, Magura city had 22,105 households and a population of 98355. 19,384 (19.71%) were under 10 years of age. Magura had a literacy rate (age 7 and over) of 66.03%, compared to the national average of 51.8%, and a sex ratio of 1005 females per 1000 males.

== Geography ==
The city's latitude and longitude are 23.4854655°N 89.4198305°E. The city has an average elevation of 12.19 meters above sea level.

== Administration ==
In 1972, a local government body (municipality) called Magura Municipality was formed to provide services and other facilities to the citizens of Magura city, which is divided into 9 wards and 61 mahallas. The toal area of Magura city is 44.36 square km. The area of Magura city is administered by Magura Municipality.

== Transport ==
Magura is the road transport hub in the region. It is on the Asian Highway 1 (AH1). There are two important intersections in the city, Vaina More Circle and Dhaka Road Intersection. Vaina More Circle goes to six directions. In the north, it goes inside the city. In the east, it goes to Dhaka through Faridpur. In the west it goes to Kushtia and Chuadanga through Jhenaidah. In the south it goes to Khulna and Benapole-Petrapole-Kolkata through Jashore. In the north-west it goes to Magura-Sreepur Road (Z7011). In the south-east it goes to Magura-Narail Road (R720). Dhaka Road Intersection goes to four directions. In the north-west it goes inside the city. In the north-east it goes to Dhaka through Faridpur. In the south-east it goes to Khulna and Benapole-Petrapole-Kolkata through Jashore and goes to Kushtia and Chuadanga through Jhenaidah. In the south-east it goes to Narail and Mohammadpur.

The main mode of transportation in Magura is by bus. There are several bus terminals in the city, including the Magura Central Bus Terminal, the Dhaka Road Bus Stop, Vaina More Bus Stand, etc. Buses run to and from Magura to all major cities in Bangladesh, including Dhaka, Khulna, and Chattogram. The journey time to Dhaka is about 3 hours.

There is no train service available in Magura. However, there is a railway station in the neighboring city Jashore.

The nearest international airport to Magura is the Shahjalal International Airport in Dhaka. and the nearest internal airport to Magura is the Jessore Airport in Jashore.

== Education ==
- Magura Medical College
- Magura Govt. High School
- Magura Govt. Girls' High School
- Government Huseyn Shaheed Suhrawardy College
