= Magura-2 =

Constituency of Bangladesh's Jatiya Sangsad

Coordinates: 23.49°N 89.42°E

- Constituency for the Jatiya Sangsad
- District: Magura District
- Division: Khulna Division
- Electorate: 416,634 (2026)

Current constituency
- Created: 1984
- Party: Bangladesh Nationalist Party
- Member: Nitai Roy Chowdhury
- ← 91 Magura-1 93 Narail-1 →

Magura-2 is a constituency represented in the Jatiya Sangsad (National Parliament) of Bangladesh since 2026 by Nitai Roy Chowdhury of the Bangladesh Nationalist Party.

== Boundaries ==
The constituency encompasses Mohammadpur and Shalikha upazilas, and four union parishads of Magura Sadar Upazila: Birail Palita, Gopalgram, Kuchiamora, and Satrujitpur.

== History ==
The constituency was created in 1984 from the Jessore-10 constituency when the former Jessore District was split into four districts: Jhenaidah, Jessore, Magura, and Narail.

== Members of Parliament ==
Election	Member	Party
1986	Mohammad Asaduzzaman	Awami League
1988	Nitai Roy Chowdhury	Jatiya Party
1991	Mohammad Asaduzzaman	Awami League
1994 by-election	Quazi Kamal	Bangladesh Nationalist Party
1996	Biren Sikder	Awami League
2001	Quazi Kamal	Bangladesh Nationalist Party
2008	Biren Sikder	Awami League
2014	Biren Sikder	Awami League
2018	Biren Sikder	Awami League
2024	Biren Sikder	Awami League
2026	Nitai Roy Chowdhury	Bangladesh Nationalist Party

== Elections ==
=== Elections in the 2020s ===
General election 2026: Magura-2
Party	Candidate	Votes	%	±%
BNP	Nitai Roy Chowdhury			
Jamaat	Md. Mustarshed Billah			
IAB				
JP(E)	Mashiar Rahman			
Majority				
Turnout				
Registered electors		416,634		
BNP gain from AL				

=== Elections in the 2010s ===
General Election 2014: Magura-2
Party	Candidate	Votes	%	±%
AL	Biren Sikder	71,857	68.5	+19.6
Independent	Md. Abdul Mannan	32,571	31.0	N/A
BNF	Firoza	504	0.5	N/A
Majority		39,286	37.4	+35.1
Turnout		104,932	35.9	−55.3
AL hold				

=== Elections in the 2000s ===
General Election 2008: Magura-2
Party	Candidate	Votes	%	±%
AL	Biren Sikder	115,275	48.9	+3.4
BNP	Nitai Roy Chowdhury	109,808	46.6	−3.8
IAB	Mostafa Kamal	10,665	4.5	N/A
Majority		5,467	2.3	−2.6
Turnout		235,748	91.2	+5.6
AL gain from BNP				

General Election 2001: Magura-2
Party	Candidate	Votes	%	±%
BNP	Quazi Kamal	106,741	50.4	+16.1
AL	Shafiquzzaman Bacchu	96,314	45.5	+5.6
IJOF	Md. Rokunuzzaman Khan	8,239	3.9	N/A
Independent	Md. Akkas Hossain Molla	313	0.1	N/A
Independent	Mosa. Selina Khatum	160	0.1	N/A
Majority		10,427	4.9	−0.7
Turnout		211,767	85.6	+1.3
BNP gain from AL				

=== Elections in the 1990s ===
General Election June 1996: Magura-2
Party	Candidate	Votes	%	±%
AL	Biren Sikder	64,218	39.9	
BNP	Quazi Kamal	55,204	34.3	
JP(E)	Nitai Roy Chowdhury	26,878	16.7	
Jamaat	Golam Akbar	10,575	6.6	
IOJ	Md. Mahabubur Rahman	2,689	1.7	
Zaker Party	Sheikh Nur Ahmed	678	0.4	
Saat Dalya Jote (Mirpur)	Khandakar Monir Ali	287	0.2	
Jatiya Samajtantrik Dal-JSD	Md. Atiar Rahman	183	0.1	
Independent	Abul Kasem Mridha	125	0.1	
Jatiya Janata Party (Asad)	Md. Akkas Hossain	94	0.1	
Independent	Md. Khaer Ali	82	0.1	
Majority		9,014	5.6	
Turnout		161,013	84.3	
AL gain from BNP				

Mohammad Asaduzzaman died in office. Quazi Kamal of the BNP was elected in a March 1994 by-election.

General Election 1991: Magura-2
Party	Candidate	Votes	%	±%
AL	Mohammad Asaduzzaman	61,067	43.6	
BNP	Majid-ul-Haq	32,266	23.1	
Jamaat	Golam Akbar	20,274	14.5	
JP(E)	Nitai Roy Chowdhury	18,301	13.1	
IOJ	Golam Rahman	4,359	3.1	
Zaker Party	Kawsar Uddin Biswas	3,021	2.2	
FP	Abul Kasem Mridha	360	0.3	
Jatiya Samajtantrik Dal-JSD	Hafizur Rahman	310	0.2	
Majority		28,801	20.6	
Turnout		139,958	68.1	
AL gain from JP(E)				
