= Payari =

Payari পয়ারী
- Village
- Interactive map of Payari
- Coordinates: 23.40°N 89.50°E
- Country: Bangladesh
- Division: Khulna Division
- District: Magura District
- Upazila: Magura Sadar Upazila

Payari is a village in Bangladesh. It is situated in Satrujitpur Union, Magura Sadar Upazila, Magura District of the Khulna Division. It is approximately 14 kilometres (8.7 mi) away from Magura Sadar Upazila. The Nabaganga River flows nearby.

== See also ==
- List of villages in Bangladesh
