= GQ Group of Companies =

Bangladeshi conglomerate

- Formation: 1981
- Headquarters: Dhaka, Bangladesh
- Region served: Bangladesh
- Official language: Bengali
- Website: www.gq-group.com

GQ Group of Companies (Bengali: জিকিউ গ্রুপ অব কোম্পানিজ) is a Bangladeshi diversified conglomerate based in Dhaka. Salma Huq is the chairperson and Abu Hasan Khan is the managing director of the Group.

== History ==
GQ Group of Companies was established in 1981 by Qazi Saleemul Huq and Salma Huq as a manufacturer of ball pens under the Econo brand.

GQ Ball Pen was listed on the Dhaka Stock Exchange in 1986.

GQ Group of Companies founded GQ Foods Limited in 1992, selling chips under Krispy Curl and krispy brand.

GQ Industries Limited was founded in 1994 as a manufacturer of woven sacks. Maladesh International (Private) Limited was founded in 1994 as a joint collaboration with a Malaysian company to produce King brand coils. Qazi Saleemul was elected to parliament in 1994 from Magura-2 in a controversial by-election as a Bangladesh Nationalist Party candidate.

GQBPIL founded in 1996 specializes in the manufacture of recyclable and biodegradable plastic products.

Saleemul was re-elected to parliament in 2001 from Magura-2. He retired from Bangladesh Nationalist Party in 2016 and is an accused in the Zia Charitable Trust corruption case. He along with all the accused were acquitted by the Supreme Court of Bangladesh on 15 January 2025. The court said that the trial court judgment " contrived misapplication of the law as tantamount to malicious prosecution"

On 21 April 2017, a GQ Ballpen and Plastic Limited factory in Savar burned down in an electric fire.

In November 2018, the sponsor directors of GQ BAll pen own 41.88 percent of its shares. In 2018 the company suffered major declines in the stock market.

In February 2020, Bangladesh Securities and Exchange Commission formed a two-member investigation team to look into the sudden rise in price of GQ Ball Pen shares on the Dhaka Stock Exchange. The share price of the companies continued to rise into 2021 and becoming a top gainer on the Dhaka Stock Exchange. Share prices declined in June 2021.

== Businesses ==
- GQ Ball Pen Industries Limited
- GQ Foods Limited
- GQ Industries Limited
- GQBPIL
- GQ Enterprise Limited
- Maladesh International (Private) Limited
- GQ Enterprise Limited
- GQ Marketing Limited
