= Nakol Union =

Nakol Union নাকোল ইউনিয়ন
- Union
- Nakol Union
- Location within Bangladesh
- Country: Bangladesh
- Division: Khulna
- District: Magura
- Upazila: Sreepur

Area
  - Total: 19.28 km^{2} (7.44 sq mi)

Population (2011)
  - Total: 25,267
  - Density: 1,311/km^{2} (3,394/sq mi)
- Time zone: UTC+6 (BST)
- Website: nakolup.magura.gov.bd

Nakol Union (Bengali: নাকোল ইউনিয়ন) is a union parishad situated at Sreepur Upazila, in Magura District, Khulna Division of Bangladesh. The union has an area of 19.28 square kilometres (7.44 sq mi) and as of 2001 had a population of 25,267. There are 20 villages and 16 mouzas in the union.
