= Nitai Roy Chowdhury =

Bangladeshi politician

- নিতাই রায় চৌধুরী
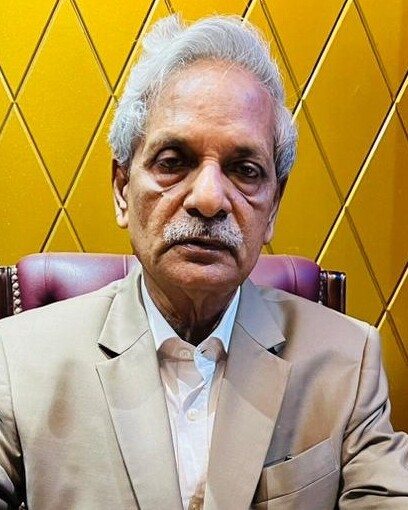
- Chowdhury in 2024

Minister of Cultural Affairs
- Incumbent
- Assumed office 17 February 2026
- Prime Minister: Tarique Rahman
- Preceded by: Mostofa Sarwar Farooki

Member of the Bangladesh Parliament for Magura-2
- Incumbent
- Assumed office 17 February 2026
- Preceded by: Biren Sikder
- In office 3 March 1988 – 6 December 1990
- Preceded by: Mohammad Asaduzzaman
- Succeeded by: Mohammad Asaduzzaman

Minister of Youth and Sports
- In office 9 September 1990 – 6 December 1990
- President: Hussain Muhammad Ershad
- Prime Minister: Kazi Zafar Ahmed
- Preceded by: A. B. M. Ruhul Amin Howlader
- Succeeded by: Alamgir M. A. Kabir

Personal details
- Born: 7 January 1949 (age 77) Magura, East Bengal, Dominion of Pakistan
- Party: Bangladesh Nationalist Party
- Other political affiliations: Jatiya Party (Ershad)
- Spouse: Jhuma Roy Chowdhury
- Children: 5, including Debasish and Nipun
- Education: University of Dhaka

Nitai Roy Chowdhury (born 7 January 1949) is a Bangladeshi lawyer and politician. He is the incumbent minister for cultural affairs and the incumbent Jatiya Sangsad member representing the Magura-2 constituency since February 2026. Over the course of his political career, he has served as the minister of youth and sports.

== Early life ==
Chowdhury was born on 7 January 1949 in Hatbaria village, Mohammadpur Upazila, Magura District. He passed higher secondary from Alokdia Pukhuria High School and graduated from Magura Government College (under Rajshahi University). He finished his law and master's degrees from the University of Dhaka.

== Career ==
Chowdhury was elected to parliament in 1988. He was the minister of the Ministry of Education and the Ministry of Law, Justice and Parliamentary Affairs in the government of Bangladesh. He was the minister of youth and sports from 9 September 1990 to 6 December 1990. He had served as the chairperson of the Magura District Council.

Chowdhury joined the Bangladesh Nationalist Party (BNP) in 2001 from the Jatiya Party. He stood as a candidate of the BNP in Magura-1 in 2001.

The party in the district was divided in two fractions, one led by Quazi Kamal and another led by Chowdhury. In December 2006, he attended an event of the Jatiyatabadi Ainjibi Forum demanding punishment for pro-Awami League lawyers who blocked the Supreme Court.

Quazi Kamal supporters prevented Chowdhury from attending an iftar program of the BNP in Magura District in September 2008. Chowdhury and Kamal are involved in an interparty political struggle. Chowdhury accused Kamal of corruption in 2007.

The Magura District unit of Jubo Dal accused Chowdhury of dividing the party in 2012. He represented Aman Ullah Aman and Gayeshwar Chandra Roy in April 2014 in a case filed over the murder of a Bangladesh Islami Chhatra Shibir activist who died in a clash with the police during the March for Democracy programme.

Chowdhury represented Khandaker Mosharraf Hossain in a money laundering case in 2015. He represented Mirza Abbas in a corruption case. He attended a session of the House of Lords on Bangladesh's political situation. He represented Moniruzzaman Moni, mayor of Khulna City Corporation, in a case to reinstate him as mayor and successfully secured a six-month stay on his suspension order.

Chowdhury represented Nipun Roy Chowdhury in November 2018 in three cases filed over clashes between the BNP activists and Bangladesh Police. Nipun was sent to jail. Chowdhury petitioned the High Court Division for withdrawal of thousands of cases filed by the government against BNP and other opposition party politicians. He was nominated by the BNP for the 2018 Bangladesh general election from Magura-2. He received 52,668 votes but lost to Awami League candidate Biren Sikder, who received 229,659. In November 2021, he was part of a delegation of the BNP that met with Minister of Law Anisul Huq to ask about sending former prime minister Khaleda Zia abroad for treatment. He called for the party to identify its foreign friends and engage farmers, laborers, and students in a movement against the government. He was an advisor to former prime minister Khaleda Zia.

Chowdhury participated in the planning of the BNP rally in July to demand the resignation of the Sheikh Hasina-led Awami League government. Chowdhury blamed the destruction of Bangladesh's legal framework for corruption in the country. Chowdhury represented Nipun Roy Chowdhury and secured bail for her in August in case over a clash between the police and BNP in Dholaikhal. In November 2023, the Bangladesh High Court granted bail to Chowdhury, AM Mahbub Uddin Khokon, and Zainul Abedin in a case filed over the vandalism of the residence of the Chief Justice of Bangladesh the previous month. In December 2023, Chowdhury represented Nipun Roy Chowdhury along with Debasish Roy Chowdhury and secured bail in eight cases at the Bangladesh High Court. He visited Dhaka Metropolitan Police headquarters to seek permission for the BNP to hold a Victory Day rally.

Chowdhury secured bail for Gayeshwar Chandra Roy and Nipun Roy Chowdhury in January 2024. He met with the Dhaka Metropolitan Police to secure permission for protests demanding the cancellation of the 12th national election. He blamed the Awami League for attacks against the minority Hindu community during the election. Following the fall of the Sheikh Hasina-led Awami League government, he called for reforms of the lower courts where legal harassments take place. He was part of a delegation of the BNP that met with Pranay Verma, Indian High Commissioner to Bangladesh, in September. He expressed confidence that the next elected government of Bangladesh will be a BNP government.

== Personal life ==
Chowdhury's daughter, advocate Nipun Roy Chowdhury, is the member of the BNP Central Executive Committee. She is married to the son of Gayeshwar Chandra Roy.
