= Bunagati Union =

Bunagati Union বুনাগাতী ইউনিয়ন
- Union
- Bunagati Union
- Country: Bangladesh
- Division: Khulna
- District: Magura
- Upazila: Mohammadpur

Area
  - Total: 36.31 km^{2} (14.02 sq mi)

Population (2011)
  - Total: 20,281
  - Density: 558.6/km^{2} (1,447/sq mi)
- Time zone: UTC+6 (BST)
- Website: bunagatiup.magura.gov.bd

Bunagati Union (Bengali: বাবুখালী ইউনিয়ন) is a union parishad situated at Mohammadpur Upazila, in Magura District, Khulna Division of Bangladesh. The union has an area of 36.31 square kilometres (14.02 sq mi) and as of 2001 had a population of 20,281. There are 11 villages and 10 mouzas in the union.
