= Mohammad Asaduzzaman (politician) =

Bangladeshi politician

- মোহাম্মদ আছাদুজ্জামান

Member of Parliament for Magura-2
- In office 1986–1988
- Preceded by: Position established
- Succeeded by: Nitai Roy Chowdhury
- In office 1991 – 25 December 1993
- Succeeded by: Quazi Kamal

Personal details
- Born: 11 November 1935 Magura District, Bengal Presidency, British India
- Died: 25 December 1993 (aged 58)
- Party: Bangladesh Awami League
- Children: Saifuzzaman Shikhor (Son) Kamrul Laila Jolly (Daughter)
- Occupation: Politician, lawyer

Mohammad Asaduzzaman (11 November 1935 – 25 December 1993) was a Bangladeshi politician who was elected four times as a Jatiya Sangsad member. His son Saifuzzaman Shikhor is the incumbent MP of Magura-1 constituency and his daughter Kamrul Laila Jolly was also a former member from the women's reserved seat.

== Biography ==
Asaduzzaman was born on 11 November 1935 in Moulovi Joka which is a village of Polashbaria Union of Mohammadpur Upazila of Magura District. When he was in class 8, he took part in Language Movement. He had joined to politics of Awami League in 1954. He also took part in various movements against the Pakistani Government, when Bangladesh was under Pakistani rule. He became general secretary of the Magura district Awami League in 1965. In 1970, he was elected to the East Pakistan Provincial Assembly. He took part in the Bangladesh Liberation War in 1971.

After independence, in 1972, he became a member of Bangladesh Ganaparishad. He became the president of the Magura district Awami League in 1976. He became an MP in Second General Election of Bangladesh in 1979. After that, he became an MP again in 1986 in Third General Election of Bangladesh and in 1991 in Fifth General Election of Bangladesh from Magura-2 constituency.

Asaduzzaman died on 25 December 1993.
