= Sreepur Union =

Sreepur Union শ্রীপুর ইউনিয়ন
- Union
- Sreepur Union
- Location within Bangladesh
- Country: Bangladesh
- Division: Khulna
- District: Magura
- Upazila: Sreepur

Area
  - Total: 21.69 km^{2} (8.37 sq mi)

Population (2011)
  - Total: 27,899
  - Density: 1,286/km^{2} (3,331/sq mi)
- Time zone: UTC+6 (BST)
- Website: sreepurup.magura.gov.bd

Sreepur Union (Bengali: শ্রীপুর ইউনিয়ন) is a union parishad situated at Sreepur Upazila, in Magura District, Khulna Division of Bangladesh. The union has an area of 21.69 square kilometres (8.37 sq mi) and as of 2001 had a population of 27,899. There are 28 villages and 22 mouzas in the union.
