= Sreekol Union =

Sreekol Union শ্রীকোল ইউনিয়ন
- Union
- Sreekol Union
- Location within Bangladesh
- Country: Bangladesh
- Division: Khulna
- District: Magura
- Upazila: Sreepur

Area
  - Total: 32.04 km^{2} (12.37 sq mi)

Population (2011)
  - Total: 23,753
  - Density: 741.4/km^{2} (1,920/sq mi)
- Time zone: UTC+6 (BST)
- Website: sreekolup.magura.gov.bd

Sreekol Union (Bengali: শ্রীকোল ইউনিয়ন) is a union parishad situated at Sreepur Upazila, in Magura District, Khulna Division of Bangladesh. The union has an area of 32.04 square kilometres (12.37 sq mi) and as of 2001 had a population of 23,753. There are 23 villages and 14 mouzas in the union.
