= Gayeshpur Union =

Gayeshpur Union গয়েশপুর ইউনিয়ন
- Union
- Gayeshpur Union
- Location within Bangladesh
- Country: Bangladesh
- Division: Khulna
- District: Magura
- Upazila: Sreepur

Area
  - Total: 25.97 km^{2} (10.03 sq mi)

Population (2011)
  - Total: 25,679
  - Density: 988.8/km^{2} (2,561/sq mi)
- Time zone: UTC+6 (BST)
- Website: goyespurup.magura.gov.bd

Gayeshpur Union (Bengali: গয়েশপুর ইউনিয়ন) is a union parishad situated at Sreepur Upazila, in Magura District, Khulna Division of Bangladesh. The union has an area of 25.97 square kilometres (10.03 sq mi) and as of 2001 had a population of 25,679. There are 30 villages and 11 mouzas in the union.
