= Shatakhali Union =

shatakhaliup Union শতখালী ইউনিয়ন
- Union
- Arpara Union
- Country: Bangladesh
- Division: Khulna
- District: Magura
- Upazila: Shalikha

Area
  - Total: 39.22 km^{2} (15.14 sq mi)

Population (2011)
  - Total: 23,064
  - Density: 588.1/km^{2} (1,523/sq mi)
- Time zone: UTC+6 (BST)
- Website: shatakhaliup.magura.gov.bd

Shatakhali Union (Bengali: শতখালী ইউনিয়ন) is a union parishad situated at Shalikha Upazila, in Magura District, Khulna Division of Bangladesh. The union has an area of 39.22 square kilometres (15.14 sq mi) and as of 2001 had a population of 23,064. There are 14 villages and 14 mouzas in the union.
