= Talkhari Union =

Talkhari Union তালখড়ি ইউনিয়ন
- Union
- Talkhari Union
- Country: Bangladesh
- Division: Khulna
- District: Magura
- Upazila: Shalikha

Area
  - Total: 27.07 km^{2} (10.45 sq mi)

Population (2011)
  - Total: 47,741
  - Density: 1,764/km^{2} (4,568/sq mi)
- Time zone: UTC+6 (BST)
- Website: talkhariup.magura.gov.bd

Talkhari Union (Bengali: তালখড়ি ইউনিয়ন) is a union parishad situated at Shalikha Upazila, in Magura District, Khulna Division of Bangladesh. The union has an area of 27.07 square kilometres (10.45 sq mi) and as of 2001 had a population of 47,741. There are 27 villages and 20 mouzas in the union.
