= Dhaneswargati Union =

Dhaneswargati Union ধনেশ্বরগাতী ইউনিয়ন
- Union
- Dhaneswargati Union
- Country: Bangladesh
- Division: Khulna
- District: Magura
- Upazila: Mohammadpur

Area
  - Total: 42.85 km^{2} (16.54 sq mi)

Population (2011)
  - Total: 30,213
  - Density: 705.1/km^{2} (1,826/sq mi)
- Time zone: UTC+6 (BST)
- Website: dhaneshwargatiup.magura.gov.bd

Dhaneswargati Union (Bengali: ধনেশ্বরগাতী ইউনিয়ন) is a union parishad situated at Mohammadpur Upazila, in Magura District, Khulna Division of Bangladesh. The union has an area of 42.85 square kilometres (16.54 sq mi) and as of 2001 had a population of 30,213. There are 25 villages and 20 mouzas in the union.
