= Nohata Union =

Nohata Union নহাটা ইউনিয়ন
- Union
- Nohata Union
- Country: Bangladesh
- Division: Khulna
- District: Magura
- Upazila: Mohammadpur

Area
  - Total: 36.29 km^{2} (14.01 sq mi)

Population (2011)
  - Total: 16,520
  - Density: 455.2/km^{2} (1,179/sq mi)
- Time zone: UTC+6 (BST)
- Website: nohataup.magura.gov.bd

Nohata Union (Bengali: বাবুখালী ইউনিয়ন) is a union parishad situated at Mohammadpur Upazila, in Magura District, Khulna Division of Bangladesh. The union has an area of 36.29 square kilometres (14.01 sq mi) and as of 2001 had a population of 16,520. There are 21 villages and 18 mouzas in the union.
