= Shobdalpur Union =

Shobdalpur Union সব্দালপুর ইউনিয়ন
- Union
- Shobdalpur Union
- Location within Bangladesh
- Country: Bangladesh
- Division: Khulna
- District: Magura
- Upazila: Sreepur

Area
  - Total: 24.67 km^{2} (9.53 sq mi)

Population (2011)
  - Total: 18,740
  - Density: 759.6/km^{2} (1,967/sq mi)
- Time zone: UTC+6 (BST)
- Website: shobdalpurup.magura.gov.bd

Shobdalpur Union (Bengali: সব্দালপুর ইউনিয়ন) is a union parishad situated at Sreepur Upazila, in Magura District, Khulna Division of Bangladesh. The union has an area of 24.67 square kilometres (9.53 sq mi) and as of 2001 had a population of 18,740. There are 21 villages and 17 mouzas in the union.
