= Mohammadpur Union =

Mohammadpur Union মহম্মদপুর ইউনিয়ন
- Union
- Mohammadpur Union
- Country: Bangladesh
- Division: Khulna
- District: Magura
- Upazila: Mohammadpur

Area
  - Total: 23.01 km^{2} (8.88 sq mi)

Population (2011)
  - Total: 19,761
  - Density: 858.8/km^{2} (2,224/sq mi)
- Time zone: UTC+6 (BST)
- Website: mohammadpurup.magura.gov.bd

Mohammadpur Union (Bengali: মহম্মদপুর ইউনিয়ন) is a union parishad situated at Mohammadpur Upazila, in Magura District, Khulna Division of Bangladesh. The union has an area of 23.01 square kilometres (8.88 sq mi) and as of 2001 had a population of 19,761. There are 25 villages and 24 mouzas in the union.
