= Shalikha Union =

Shalikha Union শালিখা ইউনিয়ন
- Union
- Shalikha Union
- Country: Bangladesh
- Division: Khulna
- District: Magura
- Upazila: Shalikha

Area
  - Total: 8.90 km^{2} (3.44 sq mi)

Population (2011)
  - Total: 18,808
  - Density: 2,110/km^{2} (5,470/sq mi)
- Time zone: UTC+6 (BST)
- Website: shalikhaup.magura.gov.bd

Arpara Union (Bengali: শালিখা ইউনিয়ন) is a union parishad situated at Shalikha Upazila, in Magura District, Khulna Division of Bangladesh. The union has an area of 8.90 square kilometres (3.44 sq mi) and as of 2001 had a population of 18,808. There are 7 villages and 7 mouzas in the union.
