= Balidia Union =

Balidia Union বালিদিয়া ইউনিয়ন
- Union
- Balidia Union
- Country: Bangladesh
- Division: Khulna
- District: Magura
- Upazila: Mohammadpur

Area
  - Total: 28.01 km^{2} (10.81 sq mi)

Population (2011)
  - Total: 40,000
  - Density: 1,400/km^{2} (3,700/sq mi)
- Time zone: UTC+6 (BST)
- Website: balidiaup.magura.gov.bd

Balidia Union (Bengali: বালিদিয়া ইউনিয়ন) is a union parishad situated at Mohammadpur Upazila, in Magura District, Khulna Division of Bangladesh. The union has an area of 28.01 square kilometres (10.81 sq mi) and as of 2001 had a population of 40,795. There are 22 villages and 12 mouzas in the union.
