= Gongarampur Union =

Gongarampur Union গঙ্গারামপুর ইউনিয়ন
- Union
- Gongarampur Union
- Country: Bangladesh
- Division: Khulna
- District: Magura
- Upazila: Shalikha

Area
  - Total: 18.70 km^{2} (7.22 sq mi)

Population (2011)
  - Total: 24,292
  - Density: 1,299/km^{2} (3,364/sq mi)
- Time zone: UTC+6 (BST)
- Website: gongarampurup.magura.gov.bd

Gongarampur Union (Bengali: গঙ্গারামপুর ইউনিয়ন) is a union parishad situated at Shalikha Upazila, in Magura District, Khulna Division of Bangladesh. The union has an area of 18.70 square kilometres (7.22 sq mi) and as of 2001 had a population of 24,292. There are 12 villages and 13 mouzas in the union.
