= Arpara Union =

Arpara Union আড়পাড়া ইউনিয়ন
- Union
- Arpara Union
- Location within Bangladesh
- Coordinates: 23.3645°N 89.3737°E
- Country: Bangladesh
- Division: Khulna
- District: Magura
- Upazila: Shalikha

Government
  - Chairman: Md. Aruj Ali

Area
  - Total: 26.05 km^{2} (10.06 sq mi)

Population (2011)
  - Total: 19,055
  - Density: 731.5/km^{2} (1,895/sq mi)
- Time zone: UTC+6 (BST)
- Postal code: (7620)
- Website: arparaup.magura.gov.bd

Arpara Union (Bengali: আড়পাড়া ইউনিয়ন) is a union parishad of Shalikha Upazila, in Magura District, Khulna Division of Bangladesh. The union has an area of 26.05 square kilometres (10.06 sq mi) and as of 2001 had a population of 19,055. There are 17 villages and 11 mouzas in the union.

There are four secondary schools in the union: Arpara Government Ideal High School, which was nationalized on 13 September 2018, Arpara Girls High School, Avoya Charan High School, and Srehatto Secondary High School.
