= Palashbaria Union =

Palashbaria Union পলাশবাড়িয়া ইউনিয়ন
- Union
- Palashbaria Union
- Country: Bangladesh
- Division: Khulna
- District: Magura
- Upazila: Mohammadpur

Area
  - Total: 84.86 km^{2} (32.76 sq mi)

Population (2011)
  - Total: 20,759
  - Density: 244.6/km^{2} (633.6/sq mi)
- Time zone: UTC+6 (BST)
- Website: palashbariaup.magura.gov.bd

Palashbaria Union (Bengali: পলাশবাড়িয়া ইউনিয়ন) is a union parishad situated at Mohammadpur Upazila, in Magura District, Khulna Division of Bangladesh. The union has an area of 84.86 square kilometres (32.76 sq mi) and as of 2001 had a population of 20,759. There are 29 villages and 22 mouzas in the union.
