= Babukhali Union =

Babukhali Union বাবুখালী ইউনিয়ন
- Union
- Babukhali Union
- Country: Bangladesh
- Division: Khulna
- District: Magura
- Upazila: Mohammadpur

Area
  - Total: 88.05 km^{2} (34.00 sq mi)

Population (2022)
  - Total: 48,500 (Approx
  - Density: 551/km^{2} (1,430/sq mi)
- Time zone: UTC+6 (BST)
- Website: babukhaliup.magura.gov.bd

Babukhali Union (Bengali: বাবুখালী ইউনিয়ন) is a union parishad situated at Mohammadpur Upazila, in Magura District, Khulna Division of Bangladesh. The union has an area of 88.05 square kilometres (34.00 sq mi) and as of 2022 had a population of 48500 (Approx). There are 33 villages and 10 mouzas in the union.
