= Rajapur Union =

Rajapur Union রাজাপুর ইউনিয়ন
- Union
- Rajapur Union
- Country: Bangladesh
- Division: Khulna
- District: Magura
- Upazila: Mohammadpur

Area
  - Total: 16.05 km^{2} (6.20 sq mi)

Population (2011)
  - Total: 24,400
  - Density: 1,520/km^{2} (3,940/sq mi)
- Time zone: UTC+6 (BST)
- Website: rajapurup.magura.gov.bd

Rajapur Union (Bengali: রাজাপুর ইউনিয়ন) is a union parishad situated at Mohammadpur Upazila, in Magura District, Khulna Division of Bangladesh. The union has an area of 16.05 square kilometres (6.20 sq mi) and as of 2001 had a population of 24,400. There are 11 villages and 10 mouzas in the union.
