= Nipun Roy Chowdhury =

Bangladeshi politician

- নিপুণ রায় চৌধুরী
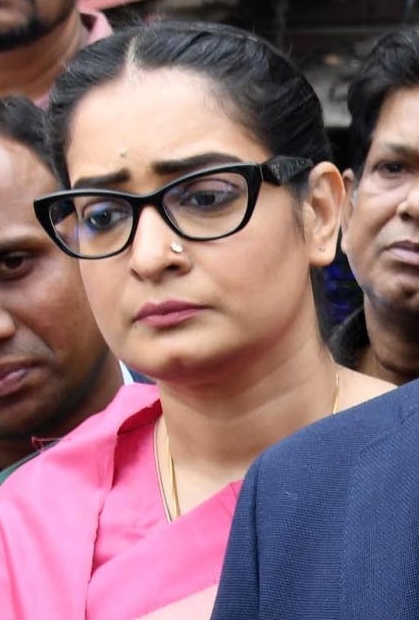
- Nipun Roy Chowdhury in 2026

Member of Parliament
- Incumbent
- Assumed office 3 May 2026
- Preceded by: Monnujan Sufian
- Constituency: Reserved Seat – 11

Personal details
- Born: 29 October 1987 (age 38) Mohammadpur, Magura, Bangladesh
- Party: Bangladesh Nationalist Party
- Spouse: Amitav Roy
- Relations: Debasish Roy Chowdhury (brother)
- Parent: Nitai Roy Chowdhury (father)
- Relatives: Gayeshwar Chandra Roy (father-in-law)
- Education: Eden Mohila College
- Occupation: Politician, lawyer

Nipun Roy Chowdhury (Bengali: নিপুণ রায় চৌধুরী; born 29 October 1987) is a Bangladeshi advocate, politician and the incumbent Jatiya Sangsad member for reserved women's seat. She serves as the general secretary of the Dhaka District branch of the Bangladesh Nationalist Party (BNP) and is a member of BNP's executive committee. She is the daughter of Nitai Roy Chowdhury, BNP vice chairman and minister.

== Early life ==
She comes from a politically active family and is married into one as well, which has kept her directly involved in politics. A former student of Eden Women's College, Nipun Roy has been politically active since her student days. She is the daughter of BNP vice chairman and minister advocate Nitai Roy Chowdhury and the daughter-in-law of BNP National Standing Committee member Gayeshwar Chandra Roy.

== Career ==
Nipun is the general secretary of the Dhaka District BNP, a member of the BNP executive committee, and the secretary of the Women and Children's Rights Forum. She is also the president of the South Keraniganj branch of BNP.

On 18 March 2021, Nipun was arrested by Dhaka Metropolitan Police from her residence in Rayerbazar, Dhaka, after an alleged telephone conversation between her and a BNP activist identified as Arman circulated online. Law enforcement authorities alleged that she had asked him to set fire to a bus following a shutdown called by Hefazat-e-Islam Bangladesh. She was also shown arrested in another case filed with Jatrabari Police Station on charges including unlawful assembly, causing serious injury, and attempted murder. A High Court bench granted her bail on 16 June 2021, and she was released from the Dhaka Central Jail two days later.

On 28 October 2023, the residence of the former Chief Justice Mohammad Muzammel Hossain was attacked and vandalism occurred in several areas surrounding a BNP rally in Naya Paltan, Dhaka. In connection with the incident, seven cases were filed with Ramna Model Police Station and Paltan Model Police Station on charges including vandalism. Nipun named in the cases. She later obtained anticipatory bail from the High Court. After the bail period expired, she surrendered before the Dhaka Metropolitan Sessions Judge's Court and applied for bail. Following a hearing, the court granted her bail in the seven cases on 24 March 2024.

On 20 April 2024, Nipun was declared a Member of Parliament for reserved women's seats in Bangladesh's 13th National Parliament.

== Personal life ==
In the 2026 Bangladeshi general election, her father-in-law, Gayeshwar Chandra Roy, was elected as a Member of Parliament from the Dhaka-3 constituency as a candidate of BNP. In the same election, Nitai Roy Chowdhury, also representing the BNP, was elected from the Magura-2 constituency and was later appointed to the Ministry of Cultural Affairs during the administration led by Tarique Rahman.

She has two brothers. Her brother Debasish Roy Chowdhury currently serves as a judge of Supreme Court of Bangladesh. Her other brother, Mithun Roy Chowdhury, serves as Joint Convener of the Magura District unit of the Bangladesh Nationalist Party.
