= Digha Union =

Digha Union দীঘা ইউনিয়ন
- Union
- Digha Union
- Country: Bangladesh
- Division: Khulna
- District: Magura
- Upazila: Mohammadpur

Area
  - Total: 22.19 km^{2} (8.57 sq mi)

Population (2011)
  - Total: 16,243
  - Density: 732.0/km^{2} (1,896/sq mi)
- Time zone: UTC+6 (BST)
- Website: dighaup.magura.gov.bd

Digha Union (Bengali: দীঘা ইউনিয়ন) is a union parishad situated at Mohammadpur Upazila, in Magura District, Khulna Division of Bangladesh. The union has an area of 22.19 square kilometres (8.57 sq mi) and as of 2001 had a population of 16,243. There are 19 villages and 16 mouzas in the union.
