= 1979 Aga Khan Gold Cup =

Tournament details
- Host country: Bangladesh
- Dates: 9 November – 6 December 1979
- Teams: 17 (from 1 confederation)
- Venue: Dhaka Stadium (in Dacca host cities)

Final positions
- Champions: (Indonesia) NIAC Mitra (1st title)
- Runners-up: (China) Liaoning

The 1979 Aga Khan Gold Cup was held in Dhaka, Bangladesh, from 9 November to 6 December 1979. The tournament was played in three phases at Dhaka Stadium. Indonesian side NIAC Mitra were crowned champions after a 1–1 draw after extra time against Liaoning of China in the final, winning on penalties (reported as 4–2 or 2–1, depending on source).

== First phase ==
A qualifying first phase was held for Bangladeshi teams only, which ended on 13 November.

=== Group A ===
Pos	Team	Pld	W	D	L	GF	GA	GD	Pts	Qualification
1	(Bangladesh) Brothers Union	1	1	0	0	2	0	+2	2	Advance to the third phase
2	(Bangladesh) Rangpur DSA	2	1	0	1	0	2	−2	2	
3	Bangladesh Air Force	1	0	0	1	0	0	0	0	

Source: RSSSF
10 November 1979

Rangpur DSA (Bangladesh)	0–0	Bangladesh Air Force
	Report
Penalties
Sabu (penalty missed); Kalam (penalty scored); Mozahar (penalty missed); Munna (penalty missed); Anwar (penalty scored)	3–1	Abu Ahmed (penalty missed); Hai (penalty missed); Anis (penalty missed); Ayub Ali (penalty scored)

Dhaka Stadium, Dacca
Referee: Zahurul Alam (Bangladesh)
12 November 1979

Brothers Union (Bangladesh)	2–0	(Bangladesh) Rangpur DSA
Bablu 51'; Babul Sr. 80'	Report

Dhaka Stadium, Dacca
Referee: Abdur Rashid (Bangladesh)

=== Group B ===
Pos	Team	Pld	W	D	L	GF	GA	GD	Pts	Qualification
1	(Bangladesh) Rahmatganj	1	1	0	0	3	1	+2	2	Advance to the third phase
2	Bangladesh Railway	1	0	0	1	1	3	−2	0	

Source: RSSSF
12 November 1979

Rahmatganj (Bangladesh)	3–1	Bangladesh Railway
Salahuddin Kala; Ashish	Report	Liton

Dhaka Stadium, Dacca
Referee: Zahurul Huq (Bangladesh)

=== Group C ===
Pos	Team	Pld	W	D	L	GF	GA	GD	Pts	Qualification
1	(Bangladesh) Arambagh KS	2	2	0	0	3	2	+1	4	Advance to the third phase
2	(Bangladesh) Wari Club	1	0	0	1	2	2	0	0	
3	(Bangladesh) Barishal DSA	1	0	0	1	0	1	−1	0	

Source: RSSSF
9 November 1979

Arambagh KS (Bangladesh)	1–0	(Bangladesh) Barishal DSA
Iqbal	Report

Dhaka Stadium, Dacca
Referee: Abdur Rashid (Bangladesh)
11 November 1979

Arambagh KS (Bangladesh)	2–2	(Bangladesh) Wari Club
Prem 27'; Jolly 60'	Report	Lovan 14'; Badal 90'
Penalties
Jolly (penalty scored); Prem (penalty scored); Hannan (penalty scored); Iqbal (penalty scored)	4–3	Jasim (penalty scored); Bayajid (penalty scored); Akhtar (penalty scored); N/A (penalty missed)

Dhaka Stadium, Dacca
Referee: Dalil Khan (Bangladesh)

=== Group D ===
Pos	Team	Pld	W	D	L	GF	GA	GD	Pts	Qualification
1	(Bangladesh) Dhaka Wanderers	2	2	0	0	0	0	0	4	Advance to the third phase
2	Bangladesh Police	1	0	0	1	0	0	0	0	
3	(Bangladesh) Victoria SC	1	0	0	1	0	0	0	0	

Source: RSSSF
9 November 1979

Dhaka Wanderers (Bangladesh)	0–0	Bangladesh Police
	Report
Penalties
Sawpan (penalty scored); Masudur Rahman Sawpan (penalty scored); Golam Mostafa Alo (penalty scored); Munir (penalty scored); Kazi Sattar (penalty scored)	5–4	Amir Hossain (penalty scored); Rezaul (penalty scored); Shamsuddin (penalty scored); Lutfur Rahman (penalty scored); Quddus (penalty missed)

Dhaka Stadium, Dacca
Referee: Munir Hossain (Bangladesh)
11 November 1979

Dhaka Wanderers (Bangladesh)	0–0	(Bangladesh) Victoria SC
	Report
Penalties
Sawpan (penalty scored); Masudur Rahman Sawpan (penalty scored); Golam Mostafa Alo (penalty scored); Munir (penalty scored); Kazi Sattar (penalty scored)	5–4	Mohshin (penalty scored); Aslam (penalty scored); Georgie (penalty scored); Dinesh (penalty scored); Patwary (penalty missed)

Dhaka Stadium, Dacca
Referee: Moihuddin Chowdhury (Bangladesh)

Qualified for the second phase: Rahmatganj, Dacca Wanderers, Brothers Union, Arambagh KS.

Byes to the second phase: Mohammedan SC, Abahani KC, BJMC.

== Second phase ==
=== Group W ===
Pos	Team	Pld	W	D	L	GF	GA	GD	Pts	Qualification
1	(Indonesia) NIAC Mitra	3	2	1	0	8	2	+6	5	Advance to the third phase
2	Singapore B	3	1	2	0	2	1	+1	4	Advance to the third phase
3	South Korea XI	3	1	1	1	6	4	+2	3	
4	(Bangladesh) Rahmatganj	3	0	0	3	2	11	−9	0	

Source: RSSSF
15 November 1979

Singapore B	2–1	(Bangladesh) Rahmatganj
Abdul Halim 44'; Goh Swee Heng 52'	Report	Salahuddin Kala 38'

Dhaka Stadium, Dacca
Referee: Hussainee (Iran)
17 November 1979

NIAC Mitra (Indonesia)	4–1	South Korea XI
Sunardi Rusidiana 3' (?); Dullah Rahim 38'; Rudy Wiljam Kelces 23'	Report	Kang Chong-Tae

Dhaka Stadium, Dacca
Referee: Daliluddin Khan (Bangladesh)
19 November 1979

Singapore B	0–0	South Korea XI
	Report

Dhaka Stadium, Dacca
Referee: Abdur Rashid (Bangladesh)
19 November 1979

NIAC Mitra (Indonesia)	4–1	(Bangladesh) Rahmatganj
Dullah Rahim; Surdani Rusidiana 30'; Siam Sul Arefin	Report	Jashim 40'

Dhaka Stadium, Dacca
Referee: Hussainee (Iran)
23 November 1979

South Korea XI	5–0	(Bangladesh) Rahmatganj
Yoo Dong-Chun 14', 16'; Cho Dong-Hyun 71', 87'; Hwang Nam-Sun 89'	Report

Dhaka Stadium, Dacca
Referee: Sultan Md Najand (Afghanistan)
23 November 1979

NIAC Mitra (Indonesia)	0–0	Singapore B
	Report

Dhaka Stadium, Dacca
Referee: P.Watana (Thailand)

=== Group X ===
Pos	Team	Pld	W	D	L	GF	GA	GD	Pts	Qualification
1	(Myanmar) Burma Trade Ministry	3	3	0	0	13	1	+12	6	Advance to the third phase
2	(Bangladesh) Abahani KC	2	1	0	1	5	3	+2	2	Advance to the third phase
3	(Bangladesh) Dhaka Wanderers	3	1	0	2	1	12	−11	2	
4	Sri Lanka President's XI	2	0	0	2	0	3	−3	0	

Source: RSSSF
15 November 1979

Dhaka Wanderers (Bangladesh)	1–0	Sri Lanka President's XI
Abdul Gaffar 34'	Report

Dhaka Stadium, Dacca
Referee: Seem Aso (Indonesia)
17 November 1979

Burma Trade Ministry (Myanmar)	2–0	Sri Lanka President's XI
Khin Maung Lay 19', 84'	Report

Dhaka Stadium, Dacca
Referee: Zahurul Alam (Bangladesh)
18 November 1979

Abahani KC (Bangladesh)	4–0	(Bangladesh) Dhaka Wanderers
Kibria Babul 14'; Babul; Tutul; Salahuddin	Report

Dhaka Stadium, Dacca
Referee: John Ong (Singapore)
November 1979

Abahani KC (Bangladesh)	N/A	Sri Lanka President's XI
	Report

Dhaka Stadium, Dacca
24 November 1979

Burma Trade Ministry (Myanmar)	8–0	(Bangladesh) Dhaka Wanderers
Khin Maung Lay 17'; Hlay Kyu 37', 38'; Ah Thiang 58'; Win Sein 61'; Tin Hlaing 65', 89'; Thet Tin 66'	Report

Dhaka Stadium, Dacca
Referee: Hussainee (Iran)
26 November 1979

Burma Trade Ministry (Myanmar)	3–1	(Bangladesh) Abahani KC
Win Sein 9', 23'; Thein Htay 80'	Report	Salahuddin 78'

Dhaka Stadium, Dacca
Referee: John Ong (Singapore)

=== Group Y ===
Pos	Team	Pld	W	D	L	GF	GA	GD	Pts	Qualification
1	(Iran) Lorestan Province	3	2	1	0	4	0	+4	5	Advance to the third phase
2	Afghanistan XI	3	2	1	0	4	1	+3	5	Advance to the third phase
3	(Bangladesh) BJIC	3	1	0	2	6	5	+1	2	
4	(Bangladesh) Brothers Union	3	0	0	3	2	10	−8	0	

Source: RSSSF
15 November 1979

Lorestan Province (Iran)	1–0	(Bangladesh) Brothers Union
	Report

Dhaka Stadium, Dacca
16 November 1979

Afghanistan XI	1–0	(Bangladesh) BJIC
	Report

Dhaka Stadium, Dacca
18 November 1979

Afghanistan XI	0–0	(Iran) Lorestan Province
	Report

Dhaka Stadium, Dacca
19 November 1979

BJIC (Bangladesh)	6–1	(Bangladesh) Brothers Union
	Report

Dhaka Stadium, Dacca
22 November 1979

Afghanistan XI	3–1	(Bangladesh) Brothers Union
	Report

Dhaka Stadium, Dacca
November 1979

Lorestan Province (Iran)	3–0	(Bangladesh) BJIC
	Report

Dhaka Stadium, Dacca

=== Group Z ===
Pos	Team	Pld	W	D	L	GF	GA	GD	Pts	Qualification
1	(China) Liaoning	4	3	1	0	14	1	+13	7	Advance to the third phase
2	(Thailand) Port Authority	4	2	2	0	8	2	+6	6	Advance to the third phase
3	(Bangladesh) Mohammedan SC	4	2	0	2	3	2	+1	4	
4	(Bangladesh) Arambagh KS	4	1	0	3	2	10	−8	2	
5	All Nepal FA XI	4	0	1	3	2	14	−12	1	

Source: RSSSF
16 November 1979

Mohammedan SC (Bangladesh)	2–0	All Nepal FA XI
	Report

Dhaka Stadium, Dacca
16 November 1979

Port Authority (Thailand)	4–0	(Bangladesh) Arambagh KS
	Report

Dhaka Stadium, Dacca
18 November 1979

Liaoning (China)	9–0	All Nepal FA XI
	Report

Dhaka Stadium, Dacca
20 November 1979

Port Authority (Thailand)	2–0	(Bangladesh) Mohammedan SC
	Report

Dhaka Stadium, Dacca
20 November 1979

Arambagh KS (Bangladesh)	1–0	All Nepal FA XI
	Report

Dhaka Stadium, Dacca
22 November 1979

Liaoning (China)	5–1	(Bangladesh) Arambagh KS
	Report

Dhaka Stadium, Dacca
22 November 1979

All Nepal FA XI	2–2	(Thailand) Port Authority
	Report

Dhaka Stadium, Dacca
24 November 1979

Liaoning (China)	0–0	(Thailand) Port Authority
	Report

Dhaka Stadium, Dacca
November 1979

Mohammedan SC (Bangladesh)	1–0	(Bangladesh) Arambagh KS
	Report

Dhaka Stadium, Dacca
27 November 1979

Liaoning (China)	W–O	(Bangladesh) Mohammedan SC
	Report

Dhaka Stadium, Dacca

== Third phase ==
=== Group X ===
Pos	Team	Pld	W	D	L	GF	GA	GD	Pts	Qualification
1	(China) Liaoning	3	2	0	1	5	2	+3	4	Advance to the semi-finals
2	(Indonesia) NIAC Mitra	3	1	2	0	2	1	+1	4	Advance to the semi-finals
3	Singapore B	3	1	1	1	3	3	0	3	
4	(Thailand) Port Authority	3	0	1	2	2	6	−4	1	

Source: RSSSF
29 November 1979

NIAC Mitra (Indonesia)	0–0	(Thailand) Port Authority
	Report

Dhaka Stadium, Dacca
29 November 1979

Liaoning (China)	1–0	Singapore B
	Report

Dhaka Stadium, Dacca
1 December 1979

Singapore B	3–2	(Thailand) Port Authority
Ahmad Safiee; Kamaruzaman; Hassan Ismail	Report	Boonnum Sukswat

Dhaka Stadium, Dacca
1 December 1979

NIAC Mitra (Indonesia)	2–1	(China) Liaoning
	Report

Dhaka Stadium, Dacca
3 December 1979

Liaoning (China)	3–0	(Thailand) Port Authority
	Report

Dhaka Stadium, Dacca
3 December 1979

NIAC Mitra (Indonesia)	0–0	Singapore B
	Report

Dhaka Stadium, Dacca

=== Group Y ===
Pos	Team	Pld	W	D	L	GF	GA	GD	Pts	Qualification
1	(Bangladesh) Abahani KC	3	2	1	0	7	2	+5	5	Advance to the semi-finals
2	(Myanmar) Burma Trade Ministry	3	1	2	0	2	1	+1	4	Advance to the semi-finals
3	(Iran) Lorestan Province	3	0	2	1	2	3	−1	2	
4	Afghanistan XI	3	0	1	2	3	8	−5	1	

Source: RSSSF
28 November 1979

Burma Trade Ministry (Myanmar)	2–1	Afghanistan XI
	Report

Dhaka Stadium, Dacca
28 November 1979

Lorestan Province (Iran)	0–0	(Bangladesh) Abahani KC
	Report

Dhaka Stadium, Dacca
30 November 1979

(Bangladesh) Abahani KC	5–1	Afghanistan XI
	Report

Dhaka Stadium, Dacca
30 November 1979

Lorestan Province (Iran)	0–0	(Myanmar) Burma Trade Ministry
	Report

Dhaka Stadium, Dacca
2 December 1979

Afghanistan XI	1–1	(Iran) Lorestan Province
	Report

Dhaka Stadium, Dacca
2 December 1979

Burma Trade Ministry (Myanmar)	1–1	(Bangladesh) Abahani KC
	Report

Dhaka Stadium, Dacca
December 1979

Lorestan Province (Iran)	1–2	(Bangladesh) Abahani KC
	Report

Dhaka Stadium, Dacca

== Knockout stage ==
=== Semi-finals ===
4 December 1979

Liaoning (China)	2–1	(Myanmar) Burma Trade Ministry
Zong Rongguo; Zhang Zengqun	Report	Tin Win

Dhaka Stadium, Dacca
5 December 1979

NIAC Mitra (Indonesia)	2–0	(Bangladesh) Abahani KC
	Report

Dhaka Stadium, Dacca

=== Final ===
6 December 1979

NIAC Mitra (Indonesia)	1–1 (a.e.t.)	(China) Liaoning
	Report
Penalties
	4–2 or 2–1

Dhaka Stadium, Dacca
