= Macquarie Law School =

Law school in Sydney, New South Wales, Australia

- Motto: And Gladly Teche (Chaucer)
- Type: Public
- Established: 1972
- Affiliations: Macquarie University
- Dean: Professor Lise Barry
- Location: Sydney, New South Wales, Australia; 33°46′31″S 151°06′43″E
- Campus: North Ryde
- Colors
- Website: https://www.mq.edu.au/faculty-of-arts/departments-and-schools/macquarie-law-school

Macquarie Law School (Macquarie Law or MQ Law) is the law school of Macquarie University and was established in 1972 as Sydney's third law school. Established as a foundational discipline of Macquarie University, Macquarie Law School is one of Australia’s premier law schools.

Entry into the law school is competitive, with candidates required to possess superior grades including an ATAR of 96, or have gained a high-distinction WAM for competitive first-year application.

Macquarie Law School aims to equip students with more than traditional skills, but more so practical skills to enter the legal profession with ease at the completion of a degree. Staff at Macquarie Law School are also active in matters of pro-bono legal work, and other various matters on domestic and international fronts.

== Dean of Macquarie Law School ==
The current Dean of Law is Professor Lise Barry.

== Location ==
The Law School is located in its own building, named the Michael Kirby Building. The Michael Kirby Building opened in 2024.

== Centres ==
Centre for Environmental Law: The University has a strong history of involvement in environmental studies and the Centre for Environmental Law was one of Australia's first. It has been formally recognised as a Centre of Excellence within the university. The centre focuses on research and cases of law concerned with international, comparative and national environmental law, climate change, biodiversity, marine law and oceans governance, planning and local government law, pollution law, corporate environmental law, Indigenous peoples and environmental rights, heritage law and policy, trade and environment, and environmental litigation and mediation. MU-CEL is a member of the International Union for Conservation of Nature (IUCN) and Macquarie University, is a founding member of the IUCN's Academy of Environmental Law.

== Macquarie University Law Society ==
Macquarie University Law Society (MULS) was founded in 1975 and is the representative body for all law students at Macquarie University. Elections are held annually to elect different members into the executive. The society offers a range of events of both strict legal and casual social nature as well as engage students to participate in various events such as mooting and mock trials.

MULS is also the main developer of the publication The Brief where articles by students, staff and legal professionals are included. The first section of The Brief contains student-written articles, interviews and pieces by prominent academics and professionals; the second section contains reports on events at MULS.

== See also ==
- Category:Macquarie Law School alumni
