= Magura Govt. Girls' High School =

High school in Magura, Bangladesh

Coordinates: 23.4913°N 89.4204°E

Magura Government Girls' High School
- মাগুরা সরকারি বালিকা উচ্চ বিদ্যালয়
- Magura, Khulna, 7600

Information
- School type: Governmental
- Status: Active
- School board: Jessore Board
- Authority: The Government of Bangladesh
- Category: High school
- Session: January–December
- Headmaster: Nirmal Kumar
- Staff: 7
- Teaching staff: 35
- Grades: 6-10
- Years offered: 1903-present
- Gender: Female
- Age: 11 to 16
- Enrollment: 1200 (approx.)
- Student to teacher ratio: 1200:42
- Language: Bengali
- Classrooms: 16
- Campus size: 1.75 hectares (4.3 acres)
- Campus type: Urban

Magura Government Girls' High School is a school of Magura District which was established in 1903. The school was nationalized in 1970.

== History ==
The school was established in 1903. After 67 years, the school was nationalized.

== Educational activities ==
There are approximately 1200 students are reading in the school. 35 teachers are teaching the students in the institution. In 2018, the school led Magura District in terms of students scoring a GPA-5 on the Secondary School Certificate exams.

== Co-curricular activities ==
The students of the school are taking part in debate, girl guides, scouts, cultural function etc. activities.

== See also ==
- Magura Government High School
