= Baroil Polita Union =

Baroil Polita Union বেরইল পলিতা ইউনিয়ন
- Union
- Baroil Polita Union
- Country: Bangladesh
- Division: Khulna
- District: Magura
- Upazila: Magura Sadar
- Established: 2010

Area
  - Total: 28.40 km^{2} (10.97 sq mi)

Population (2011)
  - Total: 26,784
  - Density: 943.1/km^{2} (2,443/sq mi)
- Time zone: UTC+6 (BST)
- Website: baroilpolitaup.magura.gov.bd

Baroil Polita Union (Bengali: বেরইল পলিতা ইউনিয়ন) is a union parishad situated at Magura Sadar Upazila, in Magura District, Khulna Division of Bangladesh. The union has an area of 28.40 square kilometres (10.97 sq mi) and as of 2001 had a population of 26,784. There are 21 villages and 16 mouzas in the union.

== Villages ==
1. Beroil
2. Bhangura
3. Sottyobanpur
4. Chandpur
5. Parpolita
6. Bijoykhali
7. Jaliavita
8. Bamondanga
9. Dohor Singra
10. Chengardanga
11. Ramchandrapur
12. Senerchar
13. Nalnagar
14. Char Batajor
15. Danga Singra
16. Batajor
17. Dighalkandi
18. Monirampur
19. Choto Joka
20. Ramdebgati
21. Putia
22. Boro Joka
