= Gangadhar Sen Roy =

Bengali Ayurvedic doctor (1798–1885)

Gangadhar Sen Roy

Gangadhar Sen Roy (1798 – 1885) was a Bengali Ayurvedic doctor, poet and Sanskrit scholar.

== Early life ==
Sen Roy was born to Bhabani Prasad Sen Roy in 1798 in Magura, the then Jessore District British India. He studied Ayurveda Shastra from Kabiraj Ramakanta Sen in Rajshahi. He went to Kolkata from Magura then came to Saidabad, near Berhampore in 1836 and settled there. He became popular as legendary physician of Murshidabad. He was also the family physician of local zamindars and Nawab family of Murshidabad. He received Kaviraj and Kaviratna title.

== Literary works ==
Sen Roy wrote poems and plays in Sanskrit. His book Jalpakalpataru is a work on ancient Charak Samhita. Sen Roy wrote almost 80 books on Ayurveda, Tantra, Sanskrit Grammar, Astrology and Philosophy. They include:

- Kavyaprava
- Lokalokapurusiya
- Durgobadhkabya
- Rajvijay
- Taravatisayangvara
- Pramadbhavjani
- Mugdhabodhamahavrth
- Taittiriyopanisadvrtti
- Harsadaya
- Tattvavidyakara
