= Kosundi Union =

Kosundi Union কছুন্দী ইউনিয়ন
- Union
- Kosundi Union
- Country: Bangladesh
- Division: Khulna
- District: Magura
- Upazila: Magura Sadar
- Established: 2010

Area
  - Total: 17.40 km^{2} (6.72 sq mi)

Population (2011)
  - Total: 10,551
  - Density: 606.4/km^{2} (1,571/sq mi)
- Time zone: UTC+6 (BST)
- Website: kosundiup.magura.gov.bd

Kosundi Union (Bengali: কছুন্দী ইউনিয়ন) is a union parishad situated at Magura Sadar Upazila, in Magura District, Khulna Division of Bangladesh. The union has an area of 17.40 square kilometres (6.72 sq mi) and as of 2001 had a population of 10,551. There are 10 villages and 6 mouzas in the union.
