= Hazrapur Union =

Hazrapur Union হাজরাপুর ইউনিয়ন
- Union
- Hazrapur Union
- Country: Bangladesh
- Division: Khulna
- District: Magura
- Upazila: Magura Sadar
- Established: 2010

Area
  - Total: 14.70 km^{2} (5.68 sq mi)

Population (2011)
  - Total: 23,075
  - Density: 1,570/km^{2} (4,066/sq mi)
- Time zone: UTC+6 (BST)
- Website: hazrapurup.magura.gov.bd

Hazrapur Union (Bengali: বেরইল পলিতা ইউনিয়ন) is a union parishad situated at Magura Sadar Upazila, in Magura District, Khulna Division of Bangladesh. The union has an area of 14.70 square kilometres (5.68 sq mi) and as of 2001 had a population of 23,075. There are 16 villages and 14 mouzas in the union.
