= Satrijitpur Union =

Satrijitpur Union শত্রুজিৎপুর ইউনিয়ন
- Union
- Satrijitpur Union
- Country: Bangladesh
- Division: Khulna
- District: Magura
- Upazila: Magura Sadar
- Established: 2010

Area
  - Total: 22.40 km^{2} (8.65 sq mi)

Population (2011)
  - Total: 18,604
  - Density: 830.5/km^{2} (2,151/sq mi)
- Time zone: UTC+6 (BST)
- Website: satrijitpurup.magura.gov.bd

Satrijitpur Union (Bengali: শত্রুজিৎপুর ইউনিয়ন) is a union parishad situated at Magura Sadar Upazila, in Magura District, Khulna Division of Bangladesh. The union has an area of 22.40 square kilometres (8.65 sq mi) and as of 2001 had a population of 18,604. There are 14 villages and 13 mouzas in the union.
