= Hazipur Union =

Hazipur Union হাজীপুর ইউনিয়ন
- Union
- Hazipur Union
- Country: Bangladesh
- Division: Khulna
- District: Magura
- Upazila: Magura Sadar
- Established: 1971

Area
  - Total: 32.40 km^{2} (12.51 sq mi)

Population (2011)
  - Total: 29,291
  - Density: 904.0/km^{2} (2,341/sq mi)
- Time zone: UTC+6 (BST)
- Website: hazipurup.magura.gov.bd

Hazipur Union (Bengali: হাজীপুর ইউনিয়ন) is a union parishad situated at Magura Sadar Upazila, in Magura District, Khulna Division of Bangladesh. The union has an area of 32.40 square kilometres (12.51 sq mi) and as of 2001 had a population of 29,291. There are 10 villages and 9 mouzas in the union.
