= Amir Hamza (poet) =

Bangladeshi poet (1931–2019)

- Born: 3 May 1931; Barishaat, Sreepur, Magura, Bengal Presidency, British India
- Died: 23 January 2019 (aged 87)
- Occupation: Poet
- Writing career
- Language: Bangla
- Notable works: Bagher Thaba (2018); Prithibir Manchitre Ekti Mujib Tumi (2021)
- Notable awards: Independence Award (revoked)

Amir Hamza (3 May 1931 – 23 January 2019) was a Bangladeshi poet, (Note: In his only known and published book "পৃথিবীর মানচিত্রে একটি মুজিব তুমি" he claimed he played a glorious role in the liberation war of 1971 by joining Sreepur Bahini.) freedom fighter, and convicted murderer. In recognition of his contribution to literature, he was posthumously awarded the highest civilian medal of Bangladesh, the Independence Award in 2022, which was later reverted on 18 March 2022.

== Early life ==
Amir Hamza was born in Barishaat village of Magura, Bengal Presidency, British India on 3 May 1931. He studied at Barishaat Kazipara Government Primary School and Maheshchandra Pilot High School till class 8.

== Criticism ==
His receiving the award, however, drew widespread criticism. Receiving this highest civilian honor of the country gave rise to discussion and criticism about him in the literary circles. On the face of widespread criticism, the Bangladesh Government assured it will carry out investigations on the recipient. During his lifetime, he only wrote a few poems, which were compiled and was published as a book in 2018, initiated by his son. He is unknown by the mass and in the Bengali literary community. Fiction writer Syed Manzoorul Islam said, "It is not right to comment on a dead person. Those who awarded him must have loved him. However, I have not read any of his books or heard his name." Popular Fiction writer Selina Hossain commented, "Who is he? I don't know him." Historian Muntassir Mamun expressed his frustration and said, "The bureaucrats and deputy secretaries of this country mainly select individuals for this award. This kind of thing happens here because the subject matter experts are not there as selectors." Hamza's son Asaduzzaman is a Bangladeshi top-bureaucrat and is serving as the chief executive officer of Khulna District Council. His son asaduzzaman lobbying Hamza's name for the award and the then Commerce Secretary Tapan Kanti Ghosh proposed Hamza's name for the award.

=== Murder conviction ===
Amir Hamza
- Status: Released
- Conviction: Murder
- Penalty: Life imprisonment (served 9 years)

Details
- Victims: Shahadat Hossain Fakir
- Date: 1978
- Weapon: Spear

He was the key suspect of murdering Shahadat Hossain Fakir with a spear in 1978. He was sentenced to life imprisonment but later acquitted on "political grounds" and got out of the jail in 1991 after serving 9 years in prison.
