= Atharokhada Union =

Atharokhada Union আঠারখাদা ইউনিয়ন
- Union
- Atharokhada Union
- Country: Bangladesh
- Division: Khulna
- District: Magura
- Upazila: Magura Sadar

Area
  - Total: 35.86 km^{2} (13.85 sq mi)

Population (2011)
  - Total: 26,807
  - Density: 747.5/km^{2} (1,936/sq mi)
- Time zone: UTC+6 (BST)
- Website: atharokhadaup.magura.gov.bd

Atharokhada Union (Bengali: আঠারখাদা ইউনিয়ন) is a union parishad situated at Magura Sadar Upazila, in Magura District, Khulna Division of Bangladesh. The union has an area of 35.86 square kilometres (13.85 sq mi) and as of 2001 had a population of 26,807. There are 29 villages and 17 mouzas in the union.

== Demographics ==
Religions (2022)
Religion	Percent
Hinduism	87.8%
Islam	22.2%
Other or not stated	0.00%

== Villages ==
- Akkurpara
- West Barial
- Naldah
- East Barial
- Araishoto
- Chandan Pratap
- Maland
- Gangnalia
- Gopinathpur
- Govindaprir
- Chanpur
- Arkandi
- Krishnabila
- Naliyardangi
- Bashkotha
- Katakhali
- Kalinagar
- Mrigidanga
- Bagdanga
- Shyamnagar
- Golaknagar
- Charpara
- Dhankhali
- Tengakhali
- Vijayanagar
- Jacquardtack
- Madhabpur
- Atharkhada
- Alikhani
