= Raghobdair Union =

Raghobdair Union রাঘবদাইড় ইউনিয়ন
- Union
- Raghobdair Union
- Country: Bangladesh
- Division: Khulna
- District: Magura
- Upazila: Magura Sadar
- Established: 2010

Area
  - Total: 120.05 km^{2} (46.35 sq mi)

Population (2011)
  - Total: 38,537
  - Density: 321.01/km^{2} (831.41/sq mi)
- Time zone: UTC+6 (BST)
- Website: raghobdairup.magura.gov.bd

Raghobdair Union (Bengali: কছুন্দী ইউনিয়ন) is a union parishad situated at Magura Sadar Upazila, in Magura District, Khulna Division of Bangladesh. The union has an area of 120.05 square kilometres (46.35 sq mi) and as of 2001 had a population of 38,537. There are 29 villages and 22 mouzas in the union.
