= Lutfunnahar Helen =

Bangladeshi educationist and freedom fighter

- লুৎফুন নাহার হেলেন
- Born: 28 December 1947; Magura, East Bengal, Dominion of Pakistan
- Died: 5 October 1971 (aged 23); Magura, East Pakistan, Pakistan
- Education: Bachelor's degree
- Alma mater: Rajshahi University

Lutfunnahar Helen (Bengali: লুৎফুন নাহার হেলেন; 28 December 1947 – 5 October 1971) was a Bangladeshi teacher and political activist associated with left‑wing student movements and the National Awami Party. She took part in local armed struggle during the Bangladesh Liberation War. In October 1971, she was captured by Razakar collaborators and Pakistani forces and was tortured and killed. She is commemorated as a female martyr of the independence struggle.

== Early life ==
Helen was born on 28 December 1947 in Magura, East Bengal, then part of the Dominion of Pakistan Her family lived in Harekrishnapur village in Mohammadpur. Her father, Fazlul Huq, was active in the National Awami Party and the local Krishak Samiti. She finished matriculation in 1963 and completed her intermediate studies at Magura College in 1965. She earned her bachelor’s degree from Rajshahi University in 1968.

== Career ==
Helen was a social activist. In 1962 while she was a student she participated in democracy protests against military dictator General Ayub Khan. She was the secretary of women affairs of the Students Union while she was in Magura College. She was also the vice-president of Magura subdivisional unit of East Pakistan Student' Union. After graduation from Rajshahi University in 1968 she joined Magura Girls' High School.

=== Bangladesh Liberation War ===
When the Bangladesh Liberation War started in 1971 she joined the war along with her brothers. Mukti Bahini members took over the camp of paramilitary Razakar in Mohammadpur Thana, Magura, and turned it into a training camp, which Helen joined. She motivated local people to join the war and worked as an informant for the Mukti Bahini, informing them about the movements of Pakistani Army and Paramilitary soldiers. She worked to supply resources to Mukti Bahini and motivate girls to join the war effort.

== Death and legacy ==
Helen was captured by a team of Razakars in Mohammadpur Thana and handed over to Pakistan Army camp in Magura in September 1971. On 5 October 1971 she was killed by Pakistan Army soldiers. She was tied to an army jeep and dragged to a canal of Nabaganga River. Her body was not recovered. Bangladesh Post Office released stamps with her image on Martyred Intellectuals Day on 14 December 1995.
