= Moghi Union =

Moghi Union মঘী ইউনিয়ন
- Union
- Moghi Union
- Country: Bangladesh
- Division: Khulna
- District: Magura
- Upazila: Magura Sadar
- Established: 2010

Area
  - Total: 95.83 km^{2} (37.00 sq mi)

Population (2011)
  - Total: 28,520
  - Density: 297.6/km^{2} (770.8/sq mi)
- Time zone: UTC+6 (BST)
- Website: moghiup.magura.gov.bd

Moghi Union (Bengali: মঘী ইউনিয়ন) is a union parishad situated at Magura Sadar Upazila, in Magura District, Khulna Division of Bangladesh. The union has an area of 95.83 square kilometres (37.00 sq mi) and as of 2001 had a population of 28,520. There are 27 villages and 11 mouzas in the union.
