= M Yousuff Ali =

Bangladeshi biologist

M Yousouff Ali
- Education: Presidency College, Calcutta; University of British Columbia
- Occupation: Fisheries biologist
- Known for: advocate for protecting the open water fishery resources

M Yousuff Ali (1 December 1926 – 31 July 1999) was a Bangladeshi fisheries biologist, policy planner, administrator and advocate for protecting the open water fishery resources.

== Early life and education ==
Ali was born on 1 December 1926 in Magura. He received his early education from Kushtia. He graduated from Presidency College, Calcutta in zoology. Later, he obtained MS and PhD degrees from Institute of Fisheries, University of British Columbia.

== Career ==
Ali joined the Department of Fisheries of Government of Bengal in 1945. After India partition he was posted in Jessore as a fisheries officer.

Ali was the director of Department of Fisheries. He retired as the secretary of the Ministry of Fisheries and Livestock in 1983. After his retirement he joined Bangladesh Centre for Advanced Studies.

Ali was the team leader of two research projects titled Monitoring of the experiments on the new and improved management of fisheries in Bangladesh and Monitoring of fish production in floodplains under the Third Fisheries Project. He had more than fifty publications. He was the author of two books titled Fish, Water and People and Open Water Fisheries of Bangladesh. These books were published in 1997 and 1999 respectively by University Press Limited, Dhaka.

Ali worked to conserve the fisheries habitats, wetlands and aquatic resources. He pioneered the artificial breeding of major carps in Bangladesh which helped in the expansion of aquaculture of the country.

Ali also worked for introduction of zoological science in the universities of the then East Pakistan. He was a fellow of the Zoological Society of Bangladesh. He also served as president of the Zoological Society of Bangladesh from 1974 to 1977.

== Death ==
Ali died on 31 July 1999 in Dhaka at the age of 72.
