= Abdur Rasheed Biswas =

Bangladeshi politician

- আবদুর রশীদ বিশ্বাস

Member of the Bangladesh Parliament for Jessore-10
- Preceded by: Position established
- Succeeded by: M. Nazim Uddin Al Azad

Personal details
- Born: Khalia Village
- Died: 11 December 1991
- Party: Bangladesh Awami League
- Occupation: Politician

Abdur Rasheed Biswas (died 1991) was a Bangladeshi politician. He was elected as MP of Jessore-10 in the first general election of Bangladesh.

He lived in Khalia village of what is now Mohammadpur Upazila of Magura District. He was Headmaster of Binodpur B.K. High School and one of the prominent organizers of the liberation war of 1971 in the region. He died on 11 December 1991.
