= Debasish Roy Chowdhury =

Bangladeshi judge

Justice of the High Court Division of Bangladesh
- Incumbent
- Assumed office 24 September 2026

Personal details
- Born: Mohammadpur, Magura, Bangladesh
- Relations: Nipun Roy Chowdhury (sister)
- Parents: Nitai Roy Chowdhury (father); Jhuma Roy Chowdhury (mother)
- Education: University of Dhaka
- Profession: Judge

Debasish Roy Chowdhury is a judge of the High Court Division of Bangladesh Supreme Court and son of MP and minister Nitai Roy Chowdhury.

== Career ==
In December 2023, Roy and Nitai Roy Chowdhury represented Nipun Roy Chowdhury in eight cases including one over the vandalism of official residence of the chief justice during a rally of the Bangladesh Nationalist Party.

Roy, along with 22 others, were appointed Judges of the High Court Division on 9 October 2024 following the fall of the Sheikh Hasina led Awami League government. He and Justice Farah Mahbub heard a petition filed by Mirza Fakhrul Islam Alamgir, Secretary General of the Bangladesh Nationalist challenging the Fifteenth Amendment to the Constitution of Bangladesh.
