= Kuchiamora Union =

Kuchiamora Union কুচিয়ামোড়া ইউনিয়ন
- Union
- Kuchiamora Union
- Country: Bangladesh
- Division: Khulna
- District: Magura
- Upazila: Magura Sadar
- Established: 2010

Area
  - Total: 35.40 km^{2} (13.67 sq mi)

Population (2011)
  - Total: 31,792
  - Density: 898.1/km^{2} (2,326/sq mi)
- Time zone: UTC+6 (BST)
- Website: kuchiamoraup.magura.gov.bd

Kuchiamora Union (Bengali: কুচিয়ামোড়া ইউনিয়ন) is a union parishad situated at Magura Sadar Upazila, in Magura District, Khulna Division of Bangladesh. The union has an area of 35.40 square kilometres (13.67 sq mi) and as of 2001 had a population of 31,792. There are 17 villages and 16 mouzas in the union.
