= Jagdal Union, Magura Sadar =

Jagdal Union জগদল ইউনিয়ন
- Union
- Jagdal Union
- Country: Bangladesh
- Division: Khulna
- District: Magura
- Upazila: Magura Sadar
- Established: 2010

Area
  - Total: 37.02 km^{2} (14.29 sq mi)

Population (2011)
  - Total: 29,298
  - Density: 791.4/km^{2} (2,050/sq mi)
- Time zone: UTC+6 (BST)
- Website: jagdalup.magura.gov.bd

Jagdal Union (Bengali: বেরইল পলিতা ইউনিয়ন) is a union parishad situated at Magura Sadar Upazila, in Magura District, Khulna Division of Bangladesh. The union has an area of 37.02 square kilometres (14.29 sq mi) and as of 2001 had a population of 29,298. There are 17 villages and 12 mouzas in the union.
