= Chawlia Union =

Chawlia Union চাউলিয়া ইউনিয়ন
- Union
- Chawlia Union
- Country: Bangladesh
- Division: Khulna
- District: Magura
- Upazila: Magura Sadar
- Established: 2010

Area
  - Total: 79.99 km^{2} (30.88 sq mi)

Population (2011)
  - Total: 28,837
  - Density: 360.5/km^{2} (933.7/sq mi)
- Time zone: UTC+6 (BST)
- Website: chawliaup.magura.gov.bd

Chawlia Union (Bengali: আঠারখাদা ইউনিয়ন) is a union parishad situated at Magura Sadar Upazila, in Magura District, Khulna Division of Bangladesh. The union has an area of 79.99 square kilometres (30.88 sq mi) and as of 2001 had a population of 28,837. There are 20 villages and 20 mouzas in the union.
