= Bogia Union =

Bogia Union বগিয়া ইউনিয়ন
- Union
- Bogia Union
- Country: Bangladesh
- Division: Khulna
- District: Magura
- Upazila: Magura Sadar
- Established: 2010

Area
  - Total: 25.67 km^{2} (9.91 sq mi)

Population (2011)
  - Total: 22,225
  - Density: 865.8/km^{2} (2,242/sq mi)
- Time zone: UTC+6 (BST)
- Website: bogiaup.magura.gov.bd

Bogia Union (Bengali: বগিয়া ইউনিয়ন) is a union parishad situated at Magura Sadar Upazila, in Magura District, Khulna Division of Bangladesh. The union has an area of 25.67 square kilometres (9.91 sq mi) and as of 2001 had a population of 22,225. There are 14 villages and 13 mouzas in the union.
