= Farrukh Ahmad =

Bangladeshi poet and writer

Syed Farrukh Ahmad
- ফররুখ আহমদ
- Born: 10 June 1918; Majhail, Sreepur, Magura, Bengal Presidency, British India
- Died: 19 October 1974 (aged 56); Dhaka, Bangladesh
- Education: Khulna Zilla School; Ripon College; Scottish Church College; City College
- Occupations: Poet, editor
- Spouse: Syeda Taieba Khatun
- Writing career
- Language: Bengali
- Genre: Poem
- Subjects: Humanism, Islamic Renaissance
- Notable works: Sat Sagorer Majhi, Naufel O Hatem, Muhurter Kobita
- Notable awards: Bangla Academy Literary Award, Ekushey Padak, Independence Day Award
- Movement: Romanticism

Syed Farrukh Ahmad (Bengali: সৈয়দ ফররুখ আহমদ; 10 June 1918 – 19 October 1974), later simply known as Farrukh Ahmad, was a Bangladeshi poet and author. He is commonly known as the poet of the Muslim renaissance, as many of his poems embody the spirit of resurrection in the hearts of the colonised Muslims of Bengal. Other than being a distinguished bearer of Islamic thought in modern Bengal, his poetry is also significant for its diction and literary value. The transition from romanticism to modernism is evident in his poetry and he is best known for his magnum opus, Sat Sagorer Majhi.

== Early life ==
Syed Farrukh Ahmad was born on 10 June 1918, to a wealthy and respected Bengali Muslim family in the village of Majhail in Sreepur, Magura, which was then under the Jessore District of the Bengal Presidency. His grandmother gave him the daak naam of Ramzan, as his birth coincided with the month of Ramadan in the Islamic calendar. His surname indicates his family claimed descent from Ali ibn Abi Talib. He was the second son of police inspector Khan Sahib Syed Hatem Ali and Begum Roushan Akhter.

== Education and career ==
He graduated from Khulna Zilla School in 1937 and did his IA from Ripon College, Kolkata in 1939. He then enrolled at the prestigious Scottish Church College to pursue a BA (Hons) in philosophy and English literature, but was unable to his complete studies there. Subsequently, he studied at the City College.

He started his professional life in Inspector General (IG) Prison Office in 1943. He worked for Civil Supply for a short time in 1944.

== Political views ==
As a student, Farrukh Ahmad had been attracted to the radical humanism of Manabendra Nath Roy and had participated in leftist politics. From the forties, however, he supported the Pakistan Movement, which advocated for an independent Muslim state. He was an ardent supporter of the Bengali language movement in 1952 as well as the Bangladesh Liberation War of 1971.

== Literary works ==
His poems reflect the legacy of Arabic and Persian in Bengal and are replete with Arabic and Persian words. He also wrote satirical poems and sonnets.

=== Books ===
- Sat Sagorer Majhi (The Sailor of the Seven Seas), December, 1944
- Sirajam Munira (September, 1952)
- Naufel O Hatem (June, 1961)
- Muhurter Kabita (A Moment's Poem), September, 1963
- Dholai Kabbo (), January, 1963
- Hatemtayi (May, 1966)
- Habida Marur Kahini (September, 1981)
- Kafela (August, 1980)
- Sindabad (October, 1983)
- Dilruba (February, 1994)

=== Books for children ===
- Pakhir Basa (The Bird's Nest)(1965)
- Horofer Chhora (Alphabet Rhymes, 1970)
- Chhorar Asor (Party of Rhymes, 1970)
- Fuler Jolsa (Concert of Flowers, December, 1985)
- Chiriyakhana (The Zoo, 1980)

== Personal life ==
He married his first cousin Syeda Tayeba Khatun Lily in November 1942. On the occasion of this marriage, Ahmad wrote the poem Upohar, which was published by the Saogat in late 1942. The couple had eleven children: Syeda Shamarukh Banu, Syeda Lalarukh Banu, Syed Abdullah al-Mahmud, Syed Abdullah al-Masud, Syed Manzur-e-Elahi, Syeda Yasmin Banu, Syed Muhammad Akhtaruzzaman (Ahmad Akhtar), Syed Muhammad Wahiduzzaman, Syed Mukhlisur Rahman, Syed Khalilur Rahman, and Syed Muhammad Abduhu.

== Awards ==
- Bangla Academy Literary Award (1960)
- President's Award for Pride of Performance (1961)
- Adamjee Literary Award (1966)
- UNESCO Prize (1966)
- Ekushey Padak (posthumously, 1977)
- Independence Day Award (posthumously, 1980. This award is also known as the Swadhinata Padak)
