= Kamrul Laila Jolly =

Bangladeshi politician

Member of Parliament
- In office 19 March 2014 – 30 December 2018

Personal details
- Born: Magura District
- Party: Bangladesh Awami League
- Parent: Mohammad Asaduzzaman

Kamrul Laila Jolly is a Bangladesh Awami League politician and a former member of parliament representing Magura District.

== Biography ==
Kamrul Laila Jolly was born on 30 October in 1964. She was elected to parliament from seat 10 of the reserved seats for women in 2014 for the 10th parliamentary session. She was elected unopposed with 47 other female members of parliament on 19 March 2014. She represents the Magura District in Khulna Division. She is a member of the Parliamentary Standing Committee on the Ministry of Liberation War Affairs. The committee investigated Minister of Liberation War Affairs AKM Mozammel Haque in 2015, after the ministry allegedly awarded low quality gold crests to foreign friends of the Bangladesh Liberation War. On 8 March 2015 she was one of the government representatives present at the triennial council of the Magura District unit of the Bangladesh Awami League where they spoke against the opposition party, Bangladesh Nationalist Party. They alleged the Bangladesh Nationalist Party was trying to turn Bangladesh into a failed state.
