= Binodpur Union =

Binodpur Union বিনোদপুর ইউনিয়ন
- Union
- Babukhali Union
- Country: Bangladesh
- Division: Khulna
- District: Magura
- Upazila: Mohammadpur

Area
  - Total: 14.70 km^{2} (5.68 sq mi)

Population (2011)
  - Total: 36,550
  - Density: 2,486/km^{2} (6,440/sq mi)
- Time zone: UTC+6 (BST)
- Website: binodpurup.magura.gov.bd

Binodpur Union (Bengali: বাবুখালী ইউনিয়ন) is a union parishad situated at Mohammadpur Upazila, in Magura District, Khulna Division of Bangladesh. The union has an area of 14.70 square kilometres (5.68 sq mi) and as of 2001 had a population of 36,550. There are 21 villages and 7 mouzas in the union.
