= Gopalgram Union =

Gopalgram Union গোপালগ্রাম ইউনিয়ন
- Union
- Gopalgram Union
- Country: Bangladesh
- Division: Khulna
- District: Magura
- Upazila: Magura Sadar
- Established: 2010

Area
  - Total: 31.40 km^{2} (12.12 sq mi)

Population (2011)
  - Total: 18,604
  - Density: 592.5/km^{2} (1,535/sq mi)
- Time zone: UTC+6 (BST)
- Website: gopalgramup.magura.gov.bd

Gopalgram Union (Bengali: গোপালগ্রাম ইউনিয়ন) is a union parishad situated at Magura Sadar Upazila, in Magura District, Khulna Division of Bangladesh. The union has an area of 31.40 square kilometres (12.12 sq mi) and as of 2001 had a population of 18,604. There are 8 villages and 8 mouzas in the union.
