= Kazi Kader Newaj =

Bangladeshi poet

- Born: 15 January 1909; Talibpur, Murshidabad, British India
- Died: 3 January 1983; Magura, Bangladesh
- Occupation: Educator

Kazi Kader Newaj (1909–1983) was a Bangladeshi poet. He won the Bangla Academy Literary Award in 1963.

== Education and career ==
Newaj earned his BA Honours in English from Berhampore College in 1927 and his master's degree from University of Calcutta in 1929.

He was the headmaster of Dinajpur Zilla School when he received the Bangla Academy Literary Award in 1963 for his contributions to children's literature.

Newaj published books of poems including Maral (1936), Dadur Baithak (1947), Nil Kumudi (1960), Duti Pakhi Duti Tara (1966), Manidvip, Utala Sandhya, Kaler Hawa, and Maruchandrika.

== Awards ==
- President's Award
- Bangla Academy Literary Award
- Madar Baksh Award
