= Biren Sikder =

Bangladeshi politician

- বীরেন শিকদার
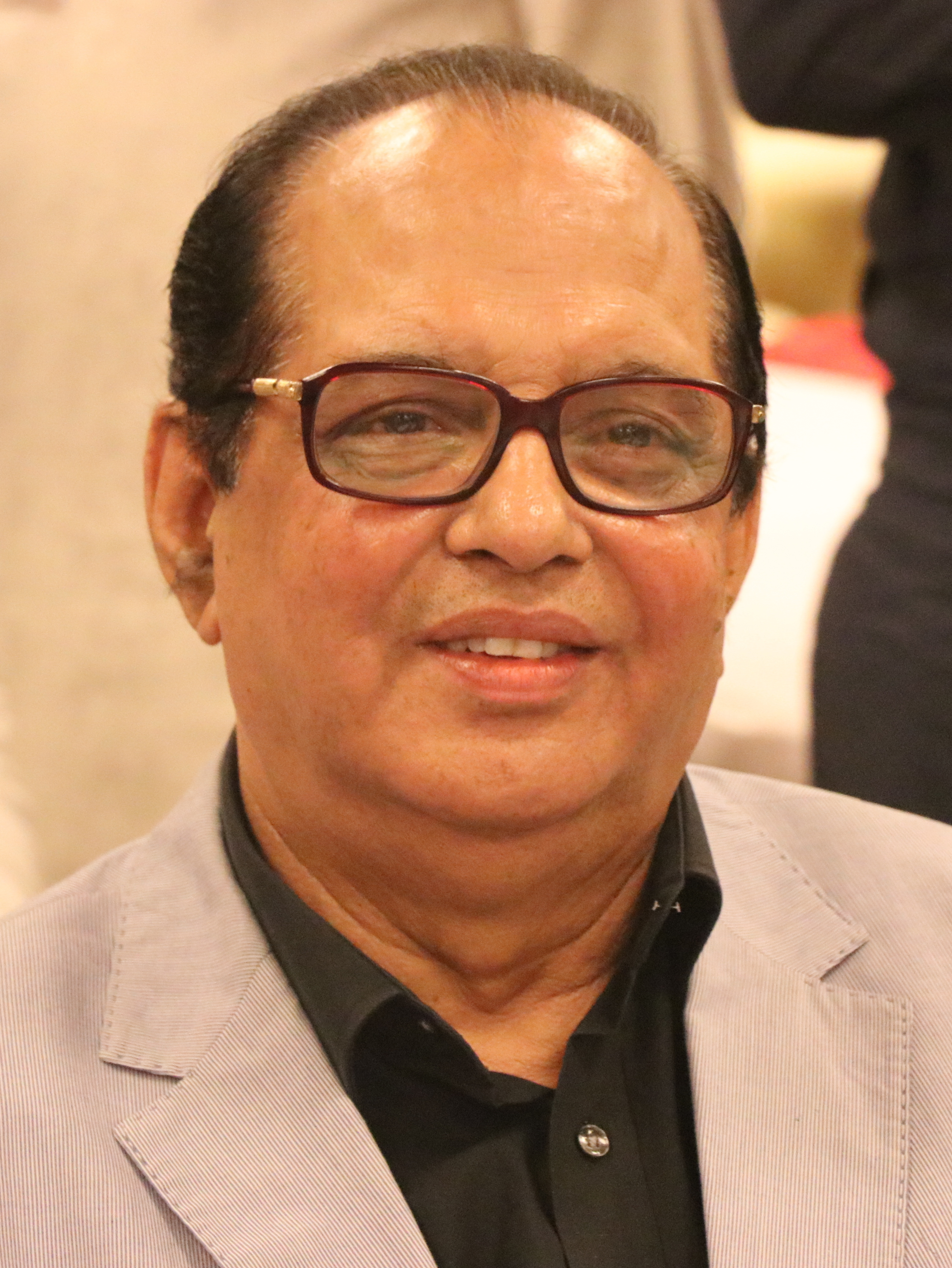
- Sikder in 2018

Member of the Bangladesh Parliament for Magura-2
- In office 25 January 2009 – 6 August 2024
- Preceded by: Quazi Kamal
- In office 14 July 1996 – 13 July 2001
- Preceded by: Quazi Kamal

State Minister for Youth and Sports
- In office 12 January 2014 – 7 January 2019
- Preceded by: Mujibul Haque
- Succeeded by: Zahid Ahsan Russell

Personal details
- Born: 16 October 1949 (age 76)
- Party: Bangladesh Awami League
- Education: University of Rajshahi

Biren Sikder (born 16 October 1949) is a Bangladesh Awami League politician and a former Jatiya Sangsad member representing the Magura-2 constituency. He served as the State Minister for Youth and Sports during 2014–2019.

== Early life ==
Sikder was born on 16 October 1949. He completed his education under the Jessore Education Board. He completed his B.A. and M.A. from the University of Rajshahi.

== Career ==
From 1968 to 1969, Sikder served as the president of greater Jessore district unit of Bangladesh Chhatra League. In 1985, he was elected chairman of Shalikha Upazila. He was elected to the parliament four times. He was a member of the Parliamentary Standing Committee on the Ministry of Commerce and the Parliamentary Standing Committee on the Education. He was the chairman of the Parliamentary Standing Committee of Textile and Jute Ministry.

Sikder was elected to Parliament from Magura-2 as a candidate of Bangladesh Awami League.
