= Syed Nazmul Hassan Lovan =

Bangladeshi footballer

Syed Nazmul Hassan
Personal information
- Full name: Syed Nazmul Hassan Lovan
- Date of birth: 20 September 1958 (age 68)
- Place of birth: Magura, East Pakistan (present-day Bangladesh)
- Height: 1.76 m (5 ft 9 in)
- Position: Forward

Senior career*
Years	Team	Apps	(Gls)
1976	Dhanmondi		
1977	Azad		
1978–1979	Wari		
1980–1983	BJMC		
1984	Brothers Union		

International career
1977	Bangladesh U19		
1978–1981	Bangladesh		
- * Club domestic league appearances and goals

Syed Nazmul Hassan Lovan (Bengali: সৈয়দ নাজমুল হাসান লোভন; born 20 September 1958) is a retired Bangladeshi professional footballer who played as a forward. He represented the Bangladesh national team between 1978 and 1981.

== Early career ==
Lovan first played senior football with Khulna Town Club in the Khulna First Division League, in 1975. After becoming league champions, he got a place in the Jessore District the following year, and went onto lift the Sher-e-Bangla Cup, scoring 6 goals along the way. In the same year, he joined Dhanmondi Club in the Dhaka Second Division League.

== Club career ==
In 1977, Lovan played in the Dhaka First Division League for Azad Sporting Club. However, it was at Wari Club where Lovan would gain fame. In the 1978 Super League round, he scored against domestic giants Abahani Krira Chakra, as Wari won the match 3–2. The defeat saw Abahani lose the league title to arch-rivals Mohammedan. The victory also started a famous chant in Dhaka football; "Wari Ailo" (lit. 'Wari are here').

He was captain of the club in 1979 and was later part of a BJMC team which finished unbeaten runners-up in the 1980 league. In 1981, he suffered a serious injury during a league game against WAPDA SC. He retired in 1984 with Brothers Union after rarely entering the pitch the previous few years.

== International career ==
He participated in the 1977 AFC Youth Championship in Iran with the Bangladesh U19 team. He was promoted to the senior team for the 1978 Asian Games in Bangkok and was also present in the team for the 1980 AFC Asian Cup qualifiers held on home soil. In first edition of the President's Gold Cup in 1981, he represented the Bangladesh Green Team, which was the main national team.

== Honours ==
Jessore District

- Sher-e-Bangla Cup: 1976

== Bibliography ==
- Dulal, Mahmud (2020). খেলার মাঠে মুক্তিযুদ্ধ (transl. Liberation war in the playground). Bishhoshahitto Bhobon. ISBN 978-984-8218-31-0.
- Alam, Masud (2017). ফুটবলের গল্প ফুটবলারদের গল্প (transl. The story of football the story of footballers) (in Bengali). Bishhoshahitto Bhobon. ISBN 9789849134688.
