= Zia Charitable Trust corruption case =

Corruption case in Bangladesh

The Zia Charitable Trust corruption case refers to a corruption case in Bangladesh that relates to corruption over the misuse of funds in a charity named after former President Ziaur Rahman. Khaleda Zia, former prime minister and BNP chairperson, was one of the accused individuals in the case. On 27 November 2024, Zia and all the accused were acquitted by the court.

== Background ==
The trust was named after the husband of Khaleda Zia, former president and army commander, Ziaur Rahman. President Zia was assassinated in 1981. The former Prime Minister Khaleda Zia has a "bitter" rivalry with former Prime Minister Sheikh Hasina.

== Case ==
Bangladesh Anti Corruption Commission filed the case in Tejgaon Police Station on 8 August 2011. The case accused four people including former Prime Minister and BNP leader, Khaleda Zia. The other accused are Harris Chowdhury, former political secretary to Khaleda Zia, Ziaul Islam Munna, incumbent acting director of naval security and traffic in Bangladesh Inland Water Transport Authority, and the personal assistant to former mayor of Dhaka, Sadeque Hossain Khoka, Monirul Islam Khan. The Anti Corruption commission filed another related case on 3 July 2008 over corruption in the Zia Orphanage. There were six accused individuals in this case including Former Prime Minister Khaleda Zia and her son Tarique Rahman. The case accused them of embezzling 21 million taka from the trust.

On 24 February 2015, an arrest warrant was issued by the court against Khaleda Zia in the case. The arrest warrant was issued after she skipped a number of court dates. She surrendered to the court and received bail on 5 April 2015. The prosecution did not oppose her bail petition. The anti-corruption-commission took the charges to court on 16 January 2012. Khaleda Zia has filled a petition with the High Court to halt the proceedings of the Zia Trust and orphanage case. Khaleda Zia and her son Tarique Rahman are on bail in the case. Tarique has been staying in London since 2008.

After 10 years of ongoing trial on 8 February 2018, Khaleda Zia and Tarique Rahman per the court verdict, were jailed for 5 and 10 years respectively due to involvement in the Zia Charitable Trust corruption case. While Tarique was in exile, Khaleda was planned to be imprisoned in old Dhaka Central Jail, Nazimuddin Road. In protest, BNP held nationwide demonstrations, which were repelled by law-enforcement across Bangladesh. A large number of BNP activists were arrested during clashes with the police. The verdict also jailed Quazi Salimul Haq Kamal, Kamal Uddin Siddique, Mominur Rahman, and Sharfuddin Ahmed.

On 29 October 2018, BNP chairperson Khaleda Zia and three others including Harris Chowdhury, former political secretary to the then PM Khaleda as per supreme court verdict were sentenced to seven years’ rigorous imprisonment in Zia Charitable Trust corruption case.

Khaleda and the other convicts were also fined Tk 10 lakh each, in default of which they will have to serve six more months in jail, according to the verdict, The court also ordered to attach in favour of the state 42 kathas of land which was purchased under the name of the trust.

== Khaleda Zia's release and verdict ==
On 6 August 2024, Khaleda Zia was released, a day after her rival Sheikh Hasina was ousted and fled to India.

On 11 November 2024, Appellate Division of the Supreme Court stayed the High Court verdict that doubled Khaleda Zia's jail term to 10 years in the Zia Orphanage Trust corruption case. The Appellate Division also allowed Khaleda to file two appeals with it challenging the HC verdict. On 27 November 2024, Zia and all the accused were acquitted by the Supreme Court of Bangladesh.
