= Magura Government High School =

Magura Govt. High School
- Bengali: মাগুরা সরকারি উচ্চ বিদ্যালয় Bengali pronunciation: [maɡura ʃɔrkari utʃːo bidːalɔe̯]

Location
- Magura-Jhenaidaha Highway; Dauladia-Faridpur-Magura-Jhenaidaha-Jessore-Khulna-Mongla Road; Magura, 7600; Bangladesh; 23°29′11″N 89°24′54″E

Information
- Other name: Magura Model School
- Former names: Shibrampur Minor School (1830s-1860); Magura High English School (1860-1960s); Magura Model High School (1960s-1970)
- Type: Governmental
- Motto: Bengali: জ্ঞানই শক্তি (Knowledge is power)
- Established: 1854; 172 years ago
- Founder: Jogendranath Sinha
- Status: Open
- School board: Jessore
- Head teacher: Md. Munirul Islam Manju (Acting)
- Staff: 8
- Teaching staff: Toatal - 47; Headteacher - 1 Assistant Headteacher - 2 Senior Teacher - 16; Assistant Teacher - 28
- Gender: Male
- Enrollment: 1,200 (Approximate)
- Classes: 5
- Language: Bengali
- Classrooms: 16
- Campus size: 5.3 hectares (13 acres)
- Campus type: Urban
- Sports: Cricket, football, chess
- Yearbook: Alakbartika
- Website: maguragovthighschool.jessoreboard.gov.bd

Magura Govt. High School (Bengali: মাগুরা সরকারি উচ্চ বিদ্যালয়, Bengali pronunciation: [maɡura ʃɔrkari utʃːo bidːalɔe̯], informally known as Magura Boys' School) is a governmental educational institution in Magura, Bangladesh. It was established in 1854 at Shibrampur in Magura, where it remained for 22 years. It moved to its present location in 1981. It was founded by Jogendranath Sinha.

The school has about 1200 students. It is a boys' school. The first headteacher was the founder Sinha himself. The current headteacher as of 2024 is BSM Shahidur Rahman, who replaced the previous headteacher, Pradip Kumar Majumdar, in April, 2024 year.

The students of this school generally took part in Junior School Certificate (JSC) exam in Class Eight and take part in Secondary School Certificate (SSC) exam in Class Ten.

== Location ==
This high school is located on the north of National Highway 7 (23°29′11″N 89°24′54″E) in Magura.

== History ==
The school was established in 1830s at the initiative of some members of the local elite at Shibrampur village, two km west of Magura town. In 1854, the school was shifted to a small house at the heart of the town. The University of Calcutta recognised it as a high English school in 1860. The school building was damaged by a fire in 1876, when its headmaster Jogendranath Sinha and Sub-Divisional Officer Kaliprasanna Singh mobilised support for its rehabilitation in a new place and construction of a new brick building for it. On 1 August 1981, the school was finally shifted to its present site and its old building was transferred to Magura Women's College. With changes of place, the school got changed names in different times. The name Magura High English School was changed to Magura Model High School in the 1960s and in 1970, it became Magura Government High School.

== Structure ==
At present, the school has a total land area of 4.50 hectares (11.1 acres). It has a large L-shaped building of 0.81 hectares (2.0 acres) and residence of its headteacher of 0.2 hectares (0.49 acres). The main school building has 16 classrooms, 3 office rooms, 4 laboratories, one auditorium and one library. Now the number of students and teachers are about 1200 and 35 respectively. The school has a big playground of 1.81 hectares (4.5 acres), a mosque, a dormitory and a pond.

== Curricular activities ==
Currently the number of students is about 1200 and the number of teachers is 47 in the school. From classes six to ten, there are a total of eleven sections. There are two shifts in this school, morning shift and day shift. The school was divided into two shifts in 2011.

== Extracurricular activities ==
The school has acquired reputation taking part in sports, especially kabaddi, handball, cricket, football, chess, debate, science fair, cultural competitions, red crescent, scouts, BNCC programs. The school also publishes a regular yearbook named Srijoni.

== See also ==
- List of schools in Bangladesh
- Magura Sadar Upazila
- Magura Govt. Girls' High School
