= Quazi Kamal =

Bangladeshi politician

- কাজী কামাল

Member of the Bangladesh Parliament for Magura-2
- In office March 1994 – 30 March 1996
- Preceded by: Mohammad Asaduzzaman
- Succeeded by: Biren Sikder
- In office 28 October 2001 – 27 October 2006
- Succeeded by: Biren Sikder

Personal details
- Party: Bangladesh Nationalist Party

Qazi Saleemul Huq (known as Quazi Kamal) is a Bangladesh Nationalist Party politician and a former Jatiya Sangsad member representing the Magura-2 constituency during 1994–1996 and 2001–2006. He is the founder of GQ Group of Industries, a manufacturing based organization in Bangladesh.

Kamal has been imprisoned since February 2018 for a 10-year sentence in the Zia Charitable Trust corruption case.

== Career ==
Kamal was elected in parliament from Magura-2 in the 1994 by-election as a candidate of Bangladesh Nationalist Party (BNP). In 2001 he was elected again from the same constituency. He was appointed as the president of Magura District unit of the party.

In January 2008, Kamal was acquitted from a case of abetting former state minister Salahuddin Ahmed in extorting money.

On 10 August 2016, Kamal resigned from the executive committee of BNP over the inclusion of Nitai Roy Chowdhury in the committee.

Kamal, along with the former Prime Minister Khaleda Zia, Tarique Rahman, Mominur Rahman, Kamal Uddin Siddique and Sharfuddin Ahmed, were sentenced to imprisonment in the Zia Charitable Trust corruption case on 8 February 2018.
