= Magura Sadar Upazila =

Magura Sadar মাগুরা সদর
- Upazila
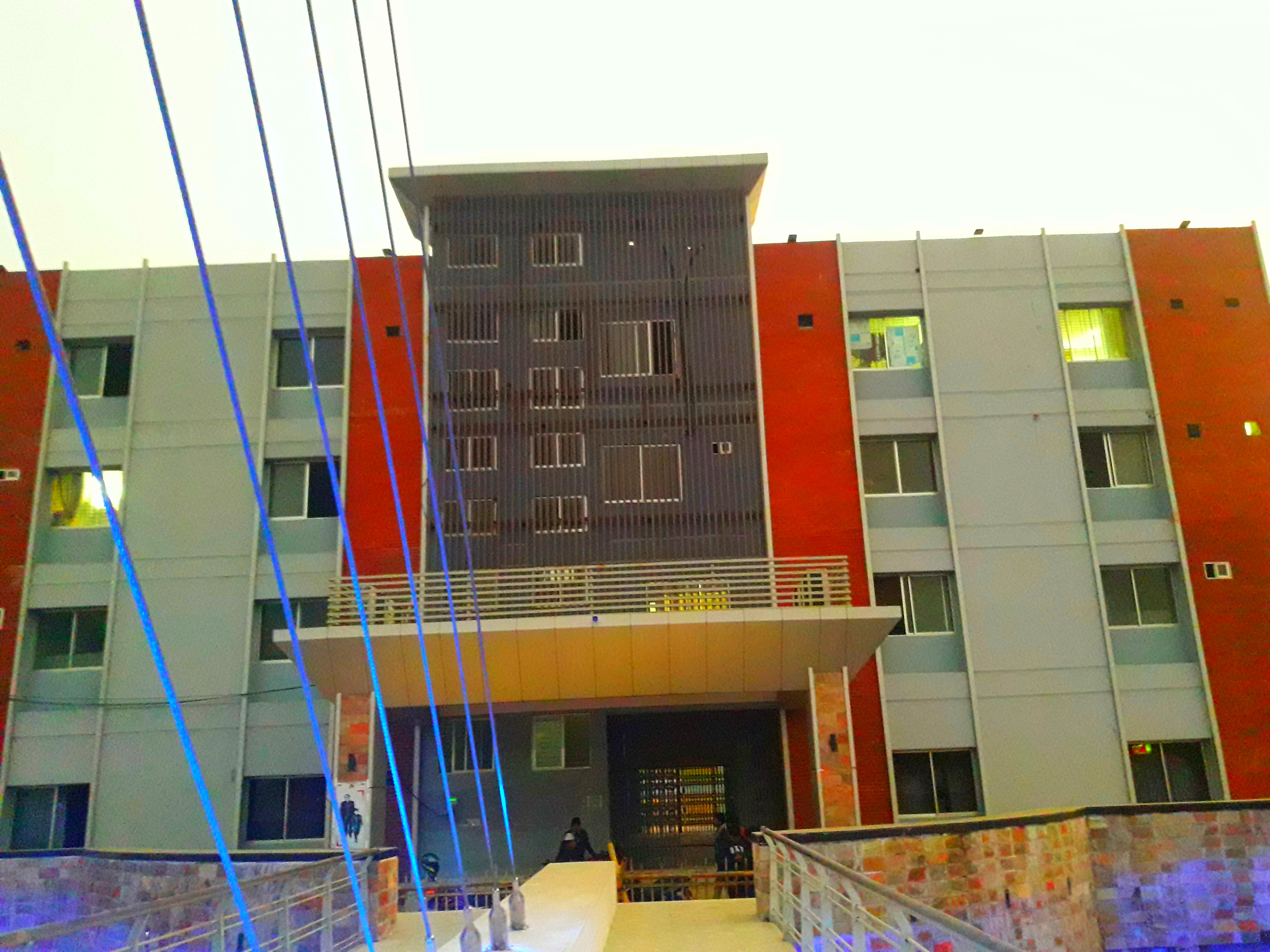
- Bir Muktijoddha Asaduzzaman Stadium

- Coordinates: 23°29.3′N 89°25.2′E
- Country: Bangladesh
- Division: Khulna
- District: Magura
- Headquarters: Magura

Area
  - Total: 401.58 km^{2} (155.05 sq mi)

Population (2022)
  - Total: 426,396
  - Density: 1,061.8/km^{2} (2,750.0/sq mi)
- Time zone: UTC+6 (BST)
- Postal code: 7600
- Area code: 0488
- Website: Official Map of Magura Sadar

Magura Sadar Upazila mauza geocode map

Magura Sadar (Bengali: মাগুরা সদর) is an upazila of Magura District in Khulna, Bangladesh. Its headquarters are in Magura.

== Geography ==
Magura Sadar is located at 23.4875°N 89.4208°E. It has 105,542 households and a total area of 401.58 km^{2}.

== Demographics ==
Religions in Magura Sadar Upazila (2022)
Religion	Percent
Islam	84.50%
Hinduism	15.43%
Other or not stated	0.07%

Population by religion in Union/Paurashava
Union/Paurashava	Muslim	Hindu	Others
Magura Paurashava	97,625	16,472	138
Atharokhada Union	5191	18,187	0
Bogia Union	17,027	1,633	0
Baroil Polita Union	15,577	5,761	6
Chawlia Union	28,530	1,388	3
Gopalgram Union	12,414	1,508	0
Hazipur Union	24,860	2,354	3
Hazrapur Union	21,798	2,604	88
Jagadal Union	26,215	1,418	18
Kosundi Union	7,430	3,454	0
Kuchiamora Union	21,679	6,558	6
Moghi Union	32,071	2,647	4
Raghobdair Union	26,130	3,999	5
Satrijitpur Union	18,781	2,815	5

🟩 Muslim majority 🟧 Hindu majority

According to the 2022 Bangladeshi census, Magura Sadar Upazila had 105,542 households and a population of 426,396. 9.18% of the population were under 5 years of age. Magura Sadar had a literacy rate (age 7 and over) of 73.68%: 76.01% for males and 71.41% for females, and a sex ratio of 97.74 males per 100 females. 131,625 (30.87%) lived in urban areas. Ethnic population was 3,249 (0.76%), of which half are Bede.

As of the 2011 Census of Bangladesh, Magura Sadar upazila had 86,162 households and a population of 380,107. 82,650 (21.74%) inhabitants were under 10 years of age. Magura Sadar had an average literacy rate of 52.4%, compared to the national average of 51.8%, and a sex ratio of 1010 females per 1000 males. 98,355 (25.88%) of the population lived in urban areas. Ethnic population was 1,844 (0.49%).

According to the 1991 Bangladesh census, Magura Sadar had a population of 286925. Males constituted 51.41% of the population, and females 48.59%. The population aged 18 or over was 145,777. Magura Sadar had an average literacy rate of 29.6% (7+ years), compared to the national average of 32.4%.

== Administration ==
Magura Sadar Upazila is divided into Magura Municipality and 13 union parishads: Atharokhada, Baroilpolita, Bogia, Chawlia, Gopalgram, Hazipur, Hazrapur, Jagdal, Kosundi, Kuchiamora, Moghi, Raghab Dair, and Satrijitpur. The union parishads are subdivided into 222 mauzas and 241 villages.

Magura Municipality is subdivided into 9 wards and 61 mahallas.

== Education ==
There are 12 colleges in the upazila: Aisa Women's College, Amoresh Bosu Degree Mohabidaylaya, Banassree Rabindra Smarani College Krishnabila (Tangakhali), Buzruk Sree Kundi College, Dakhin Nowapara Sammilani College, Government Hossain Shahid Suhrawardi College, Hazipur Sammilani College, Jagdal Sammiloni College, Magura Adarsha Degree College Magura, Magura Government Mohila College, Nazir Ahamad Degree Mahavidaloy, and Shatrujitpur College.

According to Banglapedia, Magura Government Boys' High School, founded in 1854, and Hazipur Secondary School (1914) are notable secondary schools.

== Notable residents ==
- Lutfunnahar Helen, martyred intellectual, was born in Magura in 1947 and taught at Magura Government Girls High School.
- Syed Ali Ahsan, academic, poet, writer
- Syed Sajjad Hussain, former Vice-Chancellor of University of Rajshahi

== See also ==
- Upazilas of Bangladesh
- Districts of Bangladesh
- Divisions of Bangladesh
