= Sreepur Upazila, Magura =

Sreepur শ্রীপুর (মাগুরা)
- Upazila
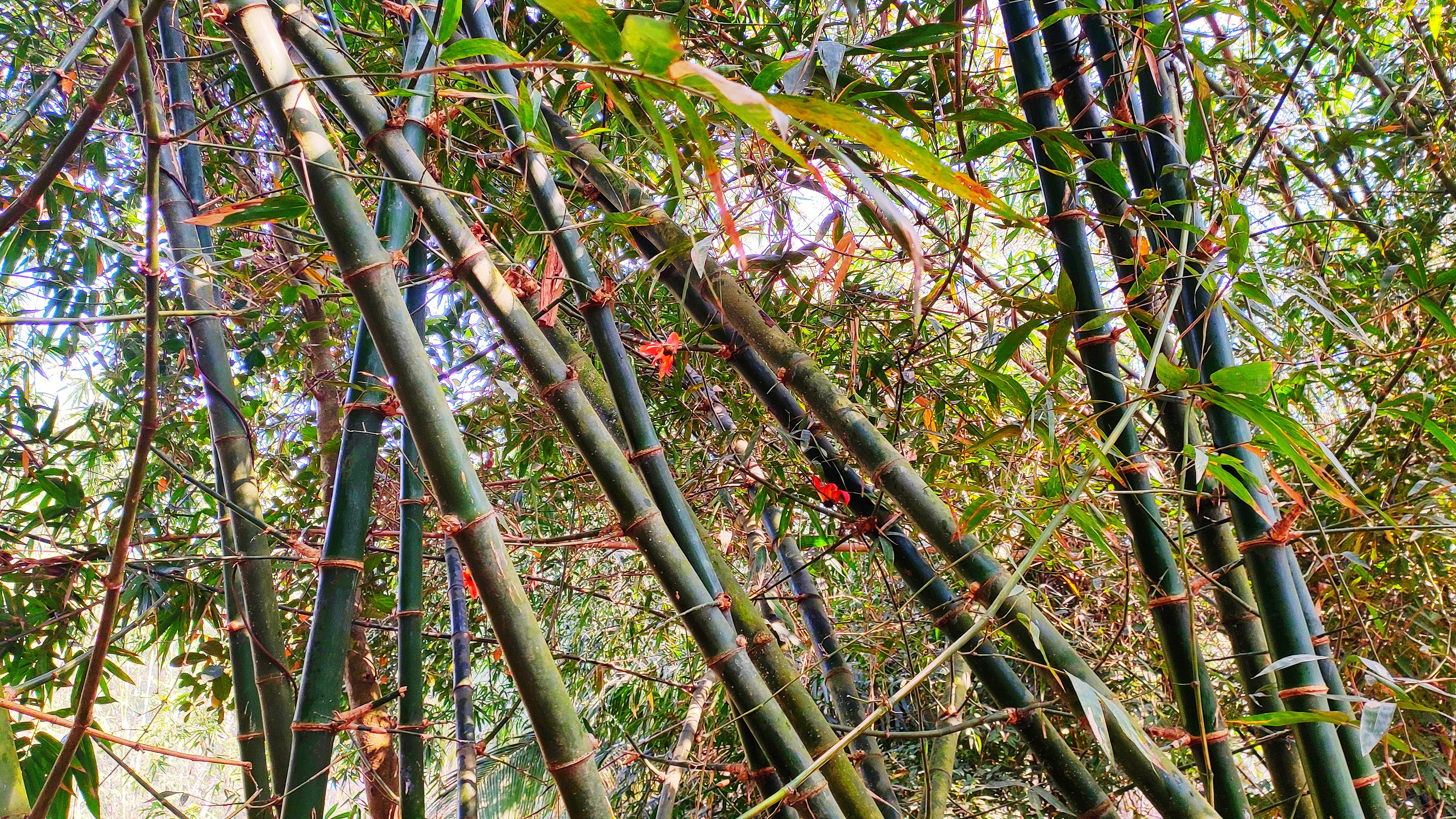
- Bamboo in Sreepur Upazila

- Coordinates: 23°36′N 89°23.3′E
- Country: Bangladesh
- Division: Khulna
- District: Magura

Area
  - Total: 175.15 km^{2} (67.63 sq mi)

Population (2022)
  - Total: 184,245
  - Density: 1,051.9/km^{2} (2,724.5/sq mi)
- Time zone: UTC+6 (BST)
- Postal code: 7610
- Area code: 04854
- Website: Official Map of Sreepur

Sreepur Upazila mauza geocode map

Sreepur Upazila mauza geocode map

Sreepur (Bengali: শ্রীপুর (মাগুরা)) is an upazila of Magura District in the Division of Khulna, Bangladesh. Sreepur thana was turned into an upazila in 1983.

== History ==
It is reported that during the reign of the Pala king in the ninth century, it was an important city. At one time in the Sreepur region there was a king ruled by a "Virat Raja". His real name was Raja Ram Chandra. The king's wife's name was Sridevi. The upazila is named after Sridevi.

== Geography ==
Sreepur upazila is located northeast of Magura district. Rajbari District to the north of the upazila, Shailkupa Upazila of Jhenaidah on the west, Magura Sadar Upazila on the south, Madhukhali Upazila. The Gorai River and the Kumar River are notable rivers of Sreepur.

Sreepur upazila has an area of 175.15 km^{2}. Sreepur upazila is the smallest upazila in Magura district.

== Demographics ==
Religions in Sreepur Upazila (2022)
| Religion | Percent |
| Islam | 82.50% |
| Hinduism | 17.48% |
| Other or not stated | 0.02% |

According to the 2022 Bangladeshi census, Sreepur Upazila had 45,475 households and a population of 184,245. 8.86% were under 5 years of age. Sreepur had a literacy rate of 68.41%: 70.17% for males and 66.77% for females, and a sex ratio of 94.97 males per 100 females. 23,011 (12.49%) lived in urban areas. Ethnic population was 980 (0.53%), of which half were Bede.

As of the 2011 Census of Bangladesh, Sreepur upazila had 37,935 households and a population of 166,749. 35,056 (21.02%) were under 10 years of age. Sreepur had an average literacy rate of 51.8%, compared to the national average of 51.8%, and a sex ratio of 1034 females per 1000 males. 4,894 (2.93%) of the population lived in urban areas. Ethnic population was 1,217 (0.73%).

== Administration ==
Sreepur Upazila is divided into eight union parishads: Amalsar, Dariapur, Gayeshpur, Kdir Para, Nakol, Sabdalpur, Sreekol, and Sreepur. The union parishads are subdivided into 83 mauzas and 164 villages.

== Education ==
Rate of literacy is about 86%. Number of Colleges:8; Number of High Schools:25; Number of Primary schools: more than 100. Colleges: Sreepur Degree College, Dwariapur Shommilony College, Nakol Shommilony Degree College, Kamlapur GK Ideal Degree College,

High Schools: Sreepur M.C. Pilot Secondary School, Khamarpara High School, Sreekole Secondary High School, Radhanagor High School, Shomiloni High School, Nakol Raicharan High School, Tikerbila High School, Doran Nagor high School and Langolbandh High School, Nobogram High School. Chair MoheshPur Secondary School, Barishat High School, Barishat purbapara dakhil madrasah

== Notable residents ==
- Kazi Kader Newaj (1909-1983) teacher and poet, born in Talibpur in the district of Murshidabad.He published several books of poems, among them Maral (1936), Dadur Baithak (1947), Nil Kumudi (1960), Duti Pakhi Duti Tara (1966), Manidvip, Utala Sandhya, Kaler Hawa, and Maruchandrika. He received the President's Award, Bangla Academy Award and Madar Baksh Award. Kazi Kader Newaj died in Jessore in 1983.
- Farrukh Ahmad (10 June 1918 – 19 October 1974) was a poet and writer of Bangladesh. He is commonly known as the 'Poet of the Muslim renaissance', as many of his poems embody the spirit of resurrection, particularly in the hearts of the down-trodden Muslims of the then Bengal.
- Amir Hamza (poet) (3 May 1931 - 23 January 2019) was a Bangladeshi poet and heroic freedom fighter. In recognition of his contribution to literature, he was posthumously awarded of Bangladesh Independence Award in 2022.

== See also ==
- Upazilas of Bangladesh
- Districts of Bangladesh
- Divisions of Bangladesh
