= Shalikha Upazila =

Shalikha শালিখা
- Upazila
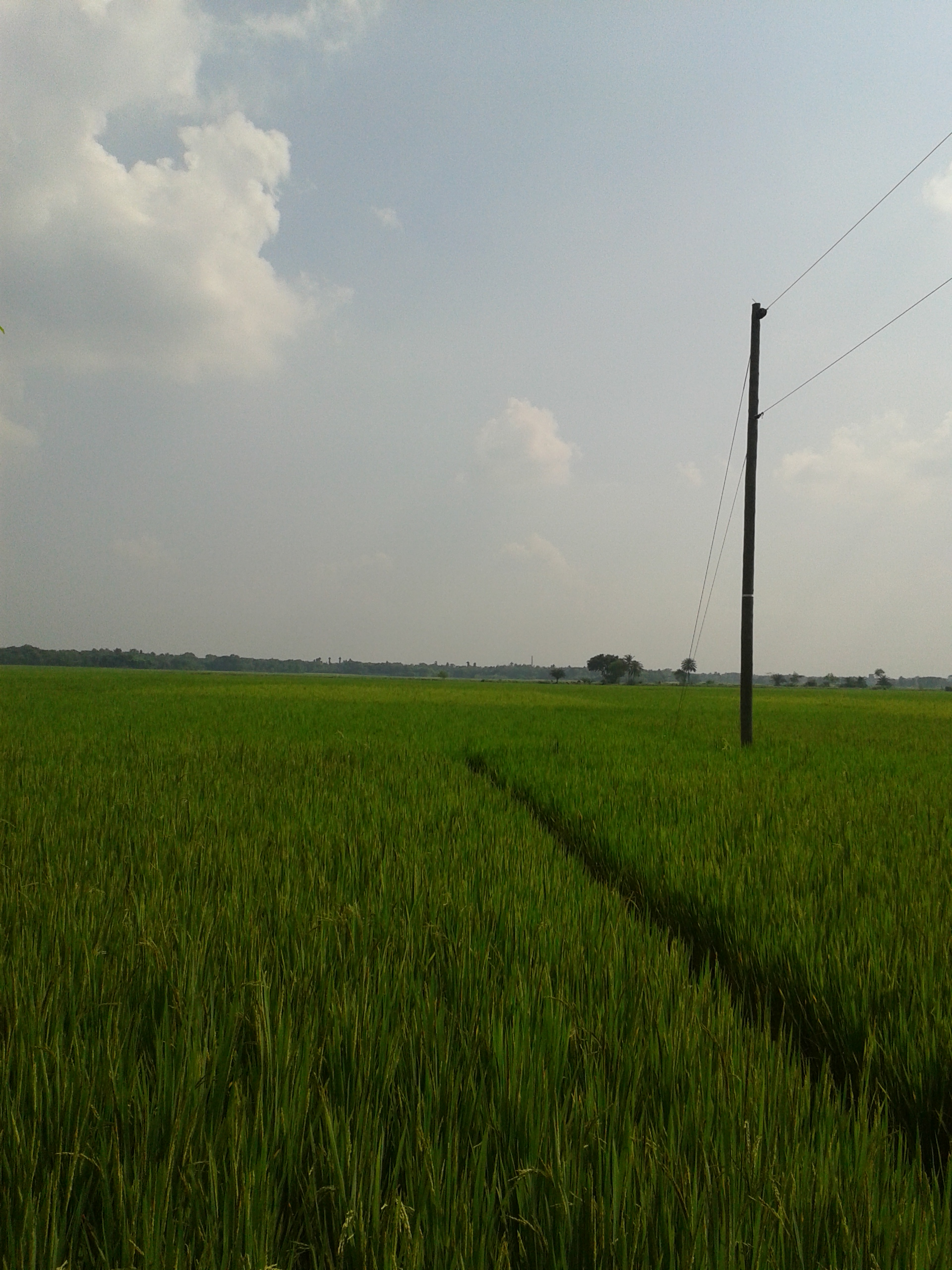
- Paddy fields in the village of Shablat, Shalikha Upazila

- Coordinates: 23°18.3′N 89°22.8′E
- Country: Bangladesh
- Division: Khulna
- District: Magura

Government
  - UNO: Tanvir Hasan Chowdhury

Area
  - Total: 228.65 km^{2} (88.28 sq mi)

Population (2022)
  - Total: 179,666
  - Density: 785.77/km^{2} (2,035.1/sq mi)
- Time zone: UTC+6 (BST)
- Postal code: 7620
- Website: Official Site of Shalikha
- Arpara is the headquarter of Shalikha upazila.

Shalikha Upazila mauza geocode map

Shalikha (Bengali: শালিখা) is an upazila of Magura District in the Division of Khulna, Bangladesh.

== Geography ==
Shalikha is located at 23.3056°N 89.3792°E. It has 36,905 households and total area 228.65 km^{2}.

== Administration ==
Shalikha Upazila is divided into seven union parishads: Arpara, Bunagati, Dhaneswargati, Gongarampur, Shalikha, Shatakhali, and Talkhari. The union parishads are subdivided into 100 mauzas and 118 villages.

== See also ==
- Upazilas of Bangladesh
- Districts of Bangladesh
- Divisions of Bangladesh
