= Mohammadpur Upazila =

Mohammadpur মহম্মদপুর (মাগুরা)
- Upazila
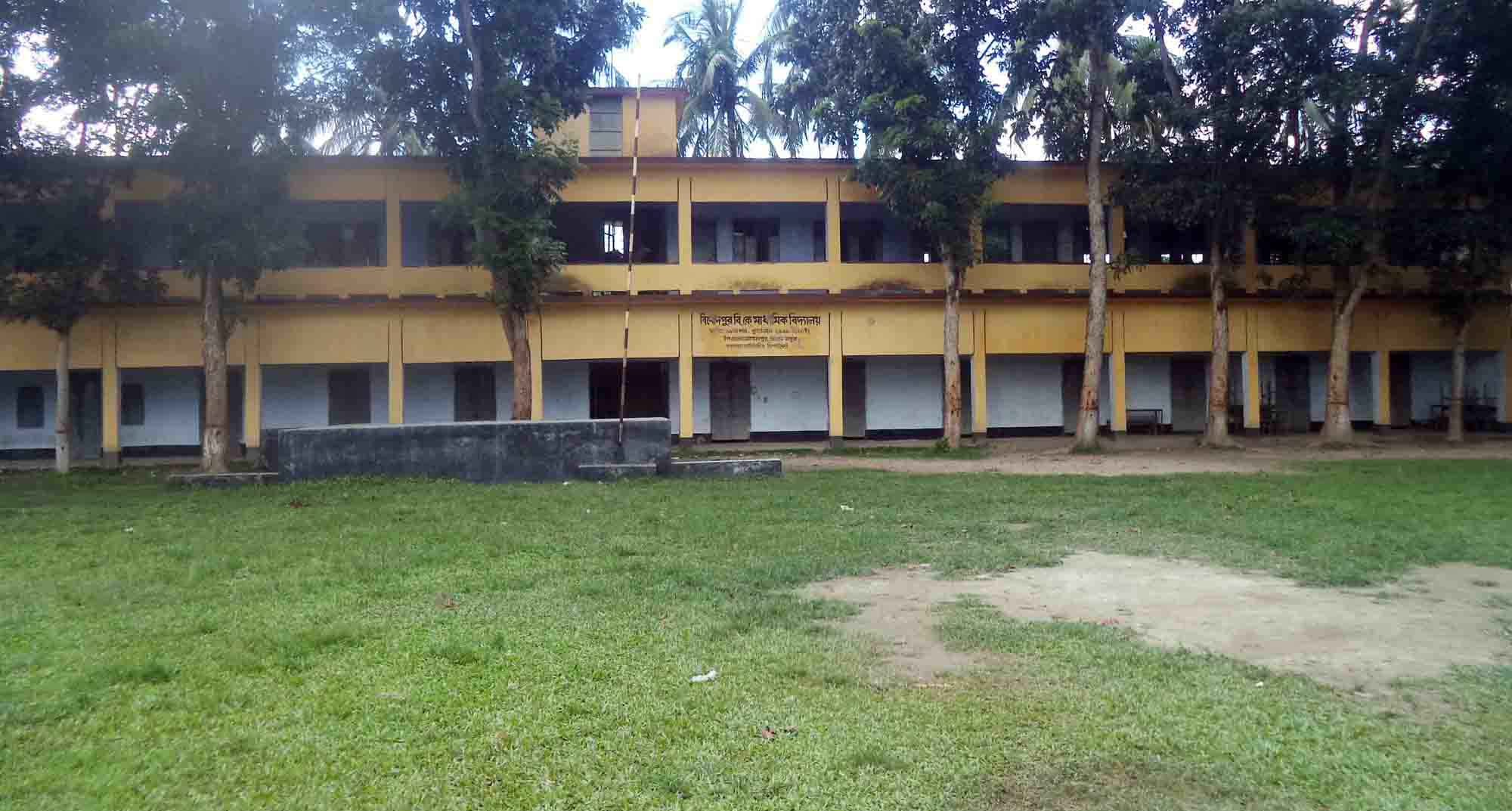
- Binodpur B.K. Secondary School

- Coordinates: 23°24.3′N 89°36.3′E
- Country: Bangladesh
- Division: Khulna
- District: Magura

Area
  - Total: 233.70 km^{2} (90.23 sq mi)

Population (2022)
  - Total: 242,808
  - Density: 1,039.0/km^{2} (2,690.9/sq mi)
- Time zone: UTC+6 (BST)
- Postal code: 7630
- Area code: 0488
- Website: Official Map of Mohammadpur

Mohammadpur Upazila mauza geocode map

Mohammadpur (Bengali: মোহাম্মদপুর (মাগুরা)) is an upazila of Magura District in the Division of Khulna, Bangladesh.

== Geography ==
Mohammadpur is located at 23.4042°N 89.6042°E. It has 44,900 households and a total area of 233.70 km^{2}. The River Naboganga flows through the Upazila. Mohammadpur stands near the bank of Modhumoti river. The Modhumoti river divides Mohammadpur from Dhaka division.

== Demographics ==
Religions in Mohammadpur Upazila (2022)
Religion	Percent
Islam	91.27%
Hinduism	8.66%
Other or not stated	0.07%

According to the 2022 Bangladeshi census, Mohammadpur Upazila had 57,676 households and a population of 242,808. 10.26% of the population were under 5 years of age. Mohammadpur had a literacy rate of 72.28%: 73.88% for males and 70.71% for females, and a sex ratio of 98.90 males per 100 females. 24,176 (9.96%) lived in urban areas.

As of the 2011 Census of Bangladesh, Mohammadpur upazila had 44,900 households and a population of 207,905. 51,497 (24.77%) were under 10 years of age. Mohammadpur had an average literacy rate of 47.7%, compared to the national average of 51.8%, and a sex ratio of 1036 females per 1000 males. 10,010 (4.81%) of the population lived in urban areas.

According to the 1991 Bangladesh census, Mohammadpur had a population of 160,340. Males constituted 50.58% of the population, and females 49.42%. The population aged 18 or over was 76,748. Mohammadpur had an average literacy rate of 25.8% (7+ years), compared to the national average of 32.4%.

== Administration ==
Mohammadpur Upazila is divided into eight union parishads: Babukhali, Balidia, Binodepur, Digha, Mohammadpur, Nohata, Palashbaria, and Rajapur. The union parishads are subdivided into 131 mauzas and 188 villages.

== Points of interest ==
Raja Sitaram Ray was an autonomous king, a vassal to the Mughal Empire, who revolted against the empire and established a short-lived sovereign Hindu dominion in Bengal region of the Indian subcontinent. 28 km from Magura Sadar, the house of Raja Sitaram Ray is located in Mohammadpur sub-district.

== Notable residents ==
- Abdur Rasheed Biswas, Member of Parliament, lived in Khalia village.
- Nitai Roy Chowdhury, Minister of Cultural Affairs of Bangladesh
- Debasish Roy Chowdhury, a judge of the High Court Division of Bangladesh Supreme Court
- Nipun Roy Chowdhury, general secretary of the Dhaka District branch of the Bangladesh Nationalist Party (BNP)

== See also ==
- Upazilas of Bangladesh
- Districts of Bangladesh
- Divisions of Bangladesh
