= Magura District =

Magura district মাগুরা জেলা
- District of Bangladesh
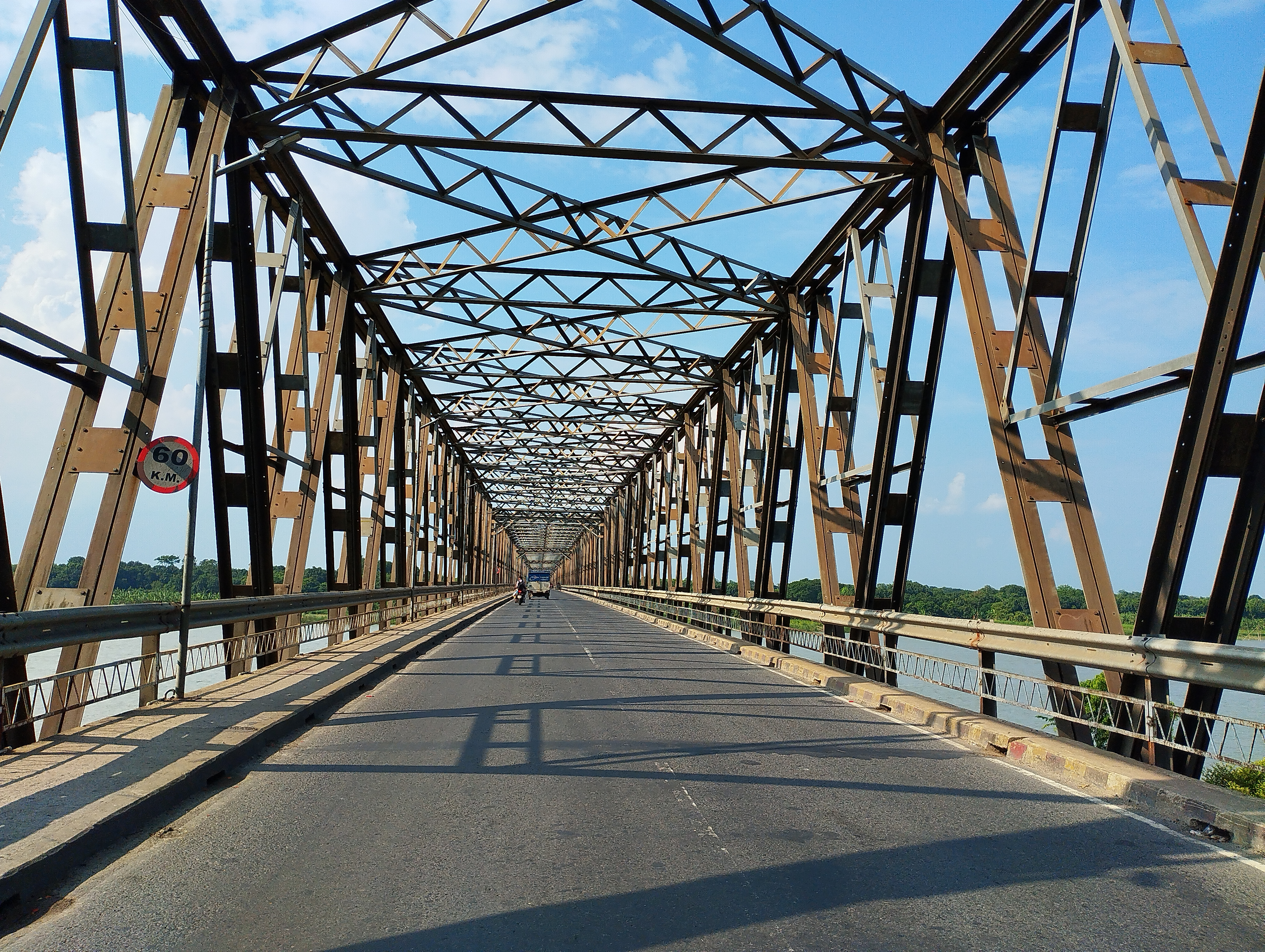
- Gorai Bridge in the district

- Location of Magura District in Bangladesh
- Interactive map of Magura district
- Coordinates: 23.40°N 89.40°E
- Country: Bangladesh
- Division: Khulna
- Headquarters: Magura

Government
  - Deputy Commissioner: Md. Abdullah Al Mahmud

Area
  - Total: 1,039.10 km^{2} (401.20 sq mi)

Population (2022)
  - Total: 1,033,115
  - Density: 994.240/km^{2} (2,575.07/sq mi)
- Time zone: UTC+06:00 (BST)
- Postal code: 7600
- Area code: 0611
- ISO 3166 code: BD-37
- HDI (2022): ▲0.701 high · 2nd of 20

Magura District (Bengali: মাগুরা জেলা) is a district in southwestern Bangladesh, and situated 176 kilometers from Dhaka. It is located in Khulna Division. Magura dristic represent by Shakib Al Hasan in the world

== History ==
Magura, like the rest of Greater Jessore, was part of the region of Vanga in the ancient period. It then became part of the Pala and Sena dynasties, before being conquered by the Delhi Sultanate. It was part of the Bengal Sultanate until the early 16th century, when it became part of the kingdom of Raja Pratapaditya. After the Mughals defeated Pratapaditya, Magura was part of the Sarkar of Mahmudabad. During the reign of Murshid Quli Khan, the Zamindar Sitaram Ray revolted against the Mughals. He killed Abu Torab, the Zamindar of Bhusna, in battle in neighbouring Faridpur district, but he was defeated and his lands were taken. Magura then became part of the Zamindari of Bhusna, which was ruled by the Natore Rajas under a Faujdar in present Jessore. After the British conquest, they organised Jessore as a district. The 1860 indigo revolt was also happening in this district.

== Administration ==
Magura District upazila geocode map

Magura district has 4 upazilas. They are:

1. Magura Sadar Upazila
2. Mohammadpur Upazila
3. Shalikha Upazila
4. Sreepur Upazila

== Geography ==
Magura District (Khulna Division) with an area of 1039.1 km^{2}, is bounded by Rajbari district to the north, Jessore and Narail districts to the south, Faridpur district to the east and Jhenaidah district to the west. The district is flat plain in the heart of the Ganges Delta.

=== Climate ===
Climate data for Magura
Month	Jan	Feb	Mar	Apr	May	Jun	Jul	Aug	Sep	Oct	Nov	Dec	Year
Mean daily maximum °C (°F)	23.4 (74.1)	27.7 (81.9)	33.3 (91.9)	35.6 (96.1)	34.8 (94.6)	32.4 (90.3)	31.4 (88.5)	31.4 (88.5)	32.2 (90.0)	31.4 (88.5)	28.9 (84.0)	25.5 (77.9)	30.7 (87.2)
Daily mean °C (°F)	16.4 (61.5)	20.2 (68.4)	26.0 (78.8)	29.2 (84.6)	29.6 (85.3)	28.9 (84.0)	28.4 (83.1)	28.6 (83.5)	28.8 (83.8)	27.3 (81.1)	23.2 (73.8)	18.7 (65.7)	25.4 (77.8)
Mean daily minimum °C (°F)	9.4 (48.9)	12.8 (55.0)	18.7 (65.7)	22.9 (73.2)	24.5 (76.1)	25.5 (77.9)	25.5 (77.9)	25.8 (78.4)	25.6 (78.1)	23.3 (73.9)	17.5 (63.5)	12.0 (53.6)	20.3 (68.5)
Average precipitation mm (inches)	11 (0.4)	19 (0.7)	40 (1.6)	85 (3.3)	183 (7.2)	323 (12.7)	302 (11.9)	288 (11.3)	242 (9.5)	156 (6.1)	25 (1.0)	7 (0.3)	1,681 (66)
Average relative humidity (%)	45	35	32	48	66	74	75	74	71	66	47	44	56
Source: National newspapers

== Demographics ==
Historical population
Year	Pop.	±% p.a.
1974	516,711	—
1981	610,698	+2.42%
1991	724,027	+1.72%
2001	824,311	+1.31%
2011	918,419	+1.09%
2022	1,033,115	+1.08%

According to the 2022 Census of Bangladesh, Magura District had 254,154 households and a population of 1,033,115 with an average 4.02 people per household. Among the population, 187,703 (18.17%) inhabitants were under 10 years of age. The population density was 994 people per km^{2}. Magura District had a literacy rate (age 7 and over) of 72.21%, compared to the national average of 74.80%, and a sex ratio of 1030 females per 1000 males. Approximately 18.90% of the population lived in urban areas. Ethnic population was 8,548 (0.83%), including Bagdi and Malo.

Religions in Magura District (2022)
Religion	Percent
Islam	84.26%
Hinduism	15.69%
Other or not stated	0.05%

Religion in present-day Magura District
Religion	1941 (Note: 1941 figures are for Magura subdivision of erstwhile Jessore district, which roughly corresponds to the present district.)		1981		1991		2001		2011		2022	
Religion	Pop.	%	Pop.	%	Pop.	%	Pop.	%	Pop.	%	Pop.	%
Islam	183,266	59.74%	448,246	73.40%	563,954	77.89%	664,937	80.67%	753,199	82.01%	870,482	84.26%
Hinduism	122,782	40.02%	162,194	26.56%	158,465	21.89%	158,685	19.25%	164,578	17.92%	162,138	15.69%
Others (Note: Including Jainism, Christianity, Buddhism, Zoroastrianism, Judaism, Ad-Dharmis, or not stated)	726	0.24%	258	0.04%	1,608	0.22%	689	0.08%	642	0.07%	495	0.05%
Total Population	306,774	100%	610,698	100%	724,027	100%	824,311	100%	918,419	100%	1,033,115	100%

In 2011, Muslims constituted 82.01% of the population while Hindus were 17.92% of the population. The Hindu population declined from 2011 to 2022.

== Education ==
- Government Huseyn Shaheed Suhrawardy College, Magura
- Magura Govt. High School, Magura Sadar, Magura
- Magura Govt. Girls' High School, Magura Sadar, Magura
- Govt. H.S.S Collage, Magura Sadar, Magura
- Pulum Golam Sarwar Secondary School, Shalikha Upazila

== Notable residents ==
- Muhammad Sohrab Hossain, Former Minister, MNA, MP and One of the founding fathers of Bangladesh. (First and only MNA from Magura, first ever MP from Magura 1, first ever Minister of Bangladesh from Magura 1972 -1975, first and only full minister from Awami League from Magura 1972 - 1975)
- Nitai Roy Chowdhury , MP, Minister of Cultural Affairs of Bangladesh
- Major general Majid-ul-Haq, former MP and Minister
- Ashiquzzaman Tulu, Bangladeshi singer
- Syed Ali Ahsan, poet
- Farrukh Ahmed, poet
- Kazi Kader Newaj, poet
- Shakib Al Hasan, all-rounder with the Bangladesh National Cricket Team, MP Magura-1
- Kazi Salimul Haque Kamal, two-term member of parliament for Magura-2
- Munshi Raisuddin, musician
- Debasish Roy Chowdhury, a judge of the High Court Division of Bangladesh Supreme Court
- Nipun Roy Chowdhury, general secretary of the Dhaka District branch of the Bangladesh Nationalist Party (BNP)
- Abdur Rasheed Biswas, former MP of jessore-10 constituency
- Amir Hamza, poet
- Shamsun Nahar Ahmed, member of parliament
- Mir Hasem Ali, MLA of East Bengal Legislative Assembly
- Syed Ator Ali, MPA of East Pakistan Provincial Assembly
- M Yousuff Ali, fisheries biologist, policy planner
- Mohammad Asaduzzaman, MP of Jatiya Sangsad
- Syed Nazmul Hassan Lovan, Bangladeshi footballer, Bangladesh national football team
- Kamrul Laila Jolly, former member of parliament
- Gangadhar Sen Roy, Ayurveda practitioner and Sanskrit scholar
- Biren Sikder, former state minister of youth and sports
- Saifuzzaman Shikhor, politician
