= Imran H Sarkar =

Bangladeshi human rights activist

Spokesperson of Ganajagaran Mancha

Personal details
- Born: October 14, 1983 (age 42) Kurigram District, Rangpur Division
- Education: Rangpur Medical College
- Occupation: Bangladeshi physician, political activist

Imran H Sarkar (sometimes spelled Sarker; born 14 October 1983) is a Bangladeshi physician, political activist, and spokesperson of the Ganajagaran Mancha (also known as Gonojagoron Moncho, Gano Jagaran Mancha, and Gono Jagaron Moncho) which led the 2013 Shahbagh protests demanding the trial of war criminals. He faced internal disputes within the platform and tensions with pro-Awami League groups. Sarkar was active in various movements, including protests against extrajudicial killings, communal violence, corruption, and the Digital Security Act. He was detained in 2018 and briefly barred from international travel for his stand on human rights and press freedom issues.

== Early life ==
Imran H Sarkar (or Sarker) was born on 14 October 1983 in Kurigram District, Rangpur Division, Bangladesh.

== Career ==
Sarkar was an activist of the Bangladesh Chhatra League while completing his MBBS at Rangpur Medical College. He was the spokesman of the Ganajagaran Mancha which organized the 2013 Shahbag protests demanding the trial of war criminals from the Bangladesh Liberation War. He claimed the platform was not connected with any political parties. He administered an oath for the protestors, which said, "We pledge to keep on demanding trial under a special tribunal of those Razakars and Al-Badrs who were convicted and were under trial but freed after 1975". There were rumours that his rise was patronized by the Awami League due to his association with the Bangladesh Chhatra League as a student.

In 2014, factional disputes took place at the Ganajagaran Mancha whereby a pro-Awami League faction tried to remove Sarkar as the spokesman. The pro-Awami League faction was led by Kamal Pasha Chowdhury, who sought a nomination from Awami League for the January 2014 election. A group of bloggers disowned him around the same time. Bangladesh Chhatra League stopped attending events since March 2013 after Imran called for a march to the Prime Minister Sheikh Hasina's office demanding a ban on Bangladesh Jamaat-i-Islami. Other pro-Awami League governments, Gourab Ekattur and Muktijoddha Sangsad Sontan Command, started boycotting Imran since April 2013 and had clashes publicly with supporters of Sarker. Bappadittyo Basu, president of Biplobi Chhatra Moitree, described Sarker's actions as "undemocratic" and “unethical”. In April, an activist of Ganajagaran Mancha and follower of Kamal Pasha, Shishir, was stabbed, he claimed by supporters of Sarker.

Sarkar was the convenor of the Bloggers and Online Activists Network. A number of secular bloggers were killed by Islamists as part of the attacks by Islamic extremists in Bangladesh. He was the member secretary of the Bijoy 2013 celebration committee and President of Youth for Peace and Democracy.

In January 2014, bombs were thrown at his rally in Bogra injuring two people. He condemned the detention of Journalist Probir Sikdar for allegedly defaming Khandaker Mosharraf Hossain, Minister of Local Government, Rural Development and Co-operatives, under the Information and Communication Technology Act.

Sarkar criticized Stephen Rapp, the United States Ambassador-at-Large for War Crimes Issues, who said that political parties should not be tried for war crimes and the focus should remain on individuals. He also condemned Chaudhry Nisar Ali Khan, Minister of Home Affairs of Pakistan, for speaking against the war crimes trial. In June 2015, Ansarullah Bangla Team issued a death threat against 25 individuals, including Sarkar. Other threatened individuals included Hasanul Haque Inu, Minister of Information; Abed Khan, journalist; Shahriar Kabir, human rights activist; AAMS Arefin Siddique, Vice-Chancellor of the University of Dhaka (DU); and Syed Anwar Hossain, DU professor; cultural activists Syed Hasan Imam, Muhammad Zafar Iqbal, writer Mofidul Hoque, Gonojagoron Mancho activists Kamal Pasha Chowdhury, Mahmudul Haque Munshi, and Bappaditya Basu. The list also included journalists Monjurul Ahsan Bulbul, Boishakhi Television CEO; Shyamal Dutta, Daily Bhorer Kagoj editor; Munni Saha, ATN News head of news; and Nobonita Chowdhury.

Sarkar announced plans to form a political party around students, which was opposed by Chhatra League (JSD), Chhatra Moitree, Chhatra Andolon, Chhatra Oikko Forum, and Chhatra Samiti. He condemned the murder of Avijit Roy by Islamic extremists and demanded justice for him. In July 2015, the Appellate Division sought information about him from the Attorney General Mahbubey Alam following his comments on the war crimes trials. He demanded justice for the murder of Sohagi Jahan Tonu as the spokesman of the Gonojagoron Mancho in 2016. He condemned the arrest of journalist Shafik Rehman, which was criticized by Sajeeb Wazed Joy, son of Prime Minister Sheikh Hasina, on Facebook. Joy said, "I have lost all respect for him. He needs to retract his statement and apologize to our government."

Golam Rabbani, leader of the Bangladesh Chhatra League, filed a defamation case in May 2017 against Sarkar for raising slogans against Prime Minister Sheikh Hasina for removing the statue of justice following the Bangladesh Statue of Justice controversy. Metropolitan Magistrate SM Masud Zaman summoned him over the case. Sumon Ahmed Shanto Babu, Jubo League Joint Convenor for Gazipur, filed another defamation case against him over the same issue. Bangladesh Chhatra League announced a ban on Sarkar entering the University of Dhaka. On 16 July 2017, Sarkar was given bail in a defamation case filed over his comments about Prime Minister Sheikh Hasina. Following their bail, they were attacked by supporters of the Awami League government inside court premises. In August 2017, Sarkar and fellow activists were attacked twice in Shahbagh in two days while trying to raise funds for flood victims and denied permission by Bangladesh Police to hold a rally. First Additional Chief Metropolitan Magistrate Sheikh Chhamidul Islam issued an arrest warrant against him in the defamation case. In September, Sarkar threatened to lay siege to the Embassy of Myanmar, demanding the country stop the Rohingya genocide.

Sarkar was critical of the Digital Security Act, 2018, referring to it as a gag on the free press which would take Bangladesh back to the medieval age. Minister of Home Affairs Asaduzzaman Khan accused Ganajagaran Mancha and Sarker of spreading fake information regarding the deaths of protestors in police action during the 2018 Bangladesh quota reform movement. Sarkar was detained in June 2018 by the Rapid Action Battalion from a rally of the Ganajagaran Mancha protesting extrajudicial killings by law enforcement during the 2018–2019 Bangladesh drug war. He was released after seven hours. according to Lieutenant Colonel Emranul Hasan, commanding officer of Rapid Action Battalion-3, who suggested Ganajagaran Mancha be required to obtain permission before holding events. In July, he was prevented from travelling to the United States to attend an event of the United States Department of State and the Bureau of Democracy, Human Rights, and Labor. Justices Tariq ul Hakim and Md Shohrowardi passed a ruling ordering the government to not prevent Sarkar from travelling abroad. He led protests following the stabbing of professor Muhammad Zafar Iqbal by Islamic extremists.

Deputy Commissioner Sultana Parvin, the Kurigram returning officer, rejected the candidacy of Sarkar for Kurigram-4 as an independence candidate for the 11th general election. He filed an appeal with the High Court Division against the cancellation of his candidature, and his appeal was rejected in December 2018. In October 2021, he accused the Awami League government of patronizing religious extremists and pointed out the government had changed textbooks following demands raised by Hefazat-e-Islam Bangladesh.

Following the fall of the Sheikh Hasina-led Awami League government, Gazi MH Tamim filed a genocide case against 19 individuals, including Sarkar, accused over the police actions during the 2013 Shapla Square protests by Hefazat-e-Islam Bangladesh. The accused in the case included, aside from Sarker, former Prime Minister Sheikh Hasina, and historian Muntasir Mamun. Arrest warrants were issued against him in March 2025.

== Personal life ==
Sarkar married Nadia Nandita Islam, daughter of former Minister of Education Nurul Islam Nahid, in 2016; the couple separated the following year.
