= 2026 Pallabi child rape and murder case =

Rape and murder case in Bangladesh

Pallabi child rape and murder case
- Court: Children Violence Suppression Tribunal
- Started: 20 May 2026 (case filed)
- Decided: 7 June 2026
- Verdict: Sohel Rana and Swapna Khatun have been found guilty, and sentenced to death
- Charge: Rape and murder under the Women and Children Repression Prevention Act, 2000

Case history
- Prior action: Confessional statement recorded before Dhaka Metropolitan Magistrate

Court membership
- Judge sitting: Judge Masrur Salekin

Case opinions
- Decision by: Masrur Salekin

Laws applied
- Penal Code, 1860 and Women and Children Repression Prevention Act, 2000; Section 164 CRPC

Area of law
- Criminal law, Women and children's rights

On 19 May 2026, 8-year-old Ramisa Aktar was raped and murdered neighbor's rented flat located in the Pallabi area of Mirpur, Dhaka, Bangladesh. She was lured from her family's flat to the house of neighbor Sohel Rana, a tenant in the next-door flat, where he sexually assaulted and murdered her. After breaking into the locked flat, her mother and other residents of the building discovered the girl's decapitated body. Rana fled the scene but was arrested the same day; he later confessed to the crime before a magistrate. Rana and his wife, Swapna Khatun, were sentenced to capital punishment the following month.

The case prompted widespread protests across Bangladesh, drew condemnation from political organisations, the Bangladesh Cricket Board, and prominent cricketers, and was met with direct government intervention, including a visit to the family by Prime Minister Tarique Rahman. Authorities pledged to complete the investigation and trial on an expedited basis.

== Background ==
=== Victim ===
Ramisa Akter was an eight-year-old girl living with her family in a flat in Block B, Section 11 of the Pallabi area of Mirpur, Dhaka. She was enrolled as a student of Class two at Popular Model High School in Pallabi, where she had ranked first in her class for two consecutive years. Her class teacher, Mahbubul Hakim, told reporters she consistently arrived at school ten minutes before the start of classes. School headmaster Saiful Islam described her as a "very meritorious student" who "never missed classes." Academic trophies from her achievements were kept at the family home.

=== Perpetrators ===
Sohel Rana aged 32 is a rickshaw mechanic who, together with his wife Swapna Khatun, aged 26, had rented a sublet room in a flat on the second or third floor of a building directly adjacent to the victim's residence approximately two months prior to the incident, for a monthly rent of 5,000 taka. According to ride-sharing driver Masud Parvez Roni, who owned the room, his own family had vacated the flat two months earlier, leaving the room to Rana and Swapna. The other tenants of the flat were away at the time of the incident.

Md Faruk Mia, a garage manager based on the ground floor of the same building, stated that Rana occasionally performed rickshaw repair work there and was addicted to Ya ba. He was thrown out of his family house in Natore earlier for various crimes including gambling and theft. Police records revealed that Rana had previously been listed as an accused in a case under the Anti-Terrorism Act.

== Incident ==
On the morning of 19 May 2026, Ramisa was at home with her mother, Parveen, and her elder sister, Raisa, while the family prepared for the school day. Raisa left to visit the home of a nearby uncle; Ramisa initially intended to follow but was told to stay. Ramisa left her flat at around 9:30 am. Parveen stated she subsequently heard a child scream from somewhere outside the flat but assumed the sound had come from another child in the building.

When Ramisa did not return and failed to appear ready for school, Parveen went looking for her. She found one of Ramisa's sandals lying outside the door of the adjacent flat occupied by Sohel Rana. Repeated knocking produced no response. Other residents gathered after hearing Parveen's cries and the door was eventually forced open at around 10:30 am.

Inside the flat, Swapna was found standing in the common area. Ramisa's headless body was discovered hidden under a bed in the room shared by Rana and Swapna; her severed head was found inside a bucket in the bathroom. Rana had escaped by cutting through the iron window grille of the room.

At a press briefing at Pallabi Police Station, DMP Additional Commissioner for Crime and Operations SN Md Nazrul Islam stated that Rana had planned to dispose of the body to conceal both the killing and the sexual assault, and that he had decapitated the child and begun severing one arm before being interrupted by the approach of neighbors. The body was transferred to Dhaka Medical College Hospital for autopsy. Sources at the hospital morgue described the extent of injuries, stating that in addition to the beheading, both arms and the left leg were nearly severed and that multiple further injuries were found on the body.

During initial police questioning, Swapna stated that Rana had locked Ramisa in the bathroom, raped her, and then killed her. Swapna was detained at the scene by neighbors and subsequently handed over to police.

== Arrest and confession ==
A search operation was launched immediately after the body was recovered. About seven hours after the crime came to light, a team of Mirpur Division Police arrested Sohel Rana from Fatullah, Narayanganj, at around 7 pm on 19 May 2026.

On 20 May 2026, Rana was produced before a Dhaka court. Investigating officer Sub-Inspector Wahiduzzaman of Pallabi Police Station applied to the court to record a confessional statement after Rana agreed to provide one voluntarily. Dhaka Metropolitan Magistrate Aminul Islam Junaid recorded the statement under Section 164 of the Code of Criminal Procedure (CRPC), in which Rana admitted to raping and killing Ramisa. The magistrate subsequently ordered Rana to be remanded to jail. Sub-Inspector Wahiduzzaman told reporters that Rana had given a detailed account of the offences during the statement.

Swapna Khatun was sent to jail custody by a separate order of Dhaka Metropolitan Magistrate Md Ashraful Haque, following a police application to keep her in custody as an alleged accomplice. Police stated that Swapna had claimed during primary interrogation to have taken sleeping pills and been unconscious during the killing, a claim authorities stated would be investigated.

The case was filed at Pallabi Police Station by the victim's father, Abdul Hannan Mollah, who named Sohel Rana, Swapna Khatun, and one unidentified person as accused. Police stated the third accused remained at large.

== Judicial proceedings ==
The case was designated for hearing before a Women and Children Repression Prevention Tribunal in Dhaka.

On 22 May 2026, the executive committee of the Dhaka Bar Association held a virtual meeting and unanimously decided that no member lawyer of the association would represent the accused in the case. General Secretary of the Dhaka Bar Association, Kalam Khan, confirmed the decision to the Bangladesh Sangbad Sangstha (BSS).

Law Minister Md Asaduzzaman, speaking to reporters on 21 May 2026, stated that he had telephoned the DMP Commissioner that morning and directed him to complete the investigation report within one week. He said the government wished to set a precedent through the handling of the case, as it had in the 2025 Magura child rape case, where a charge sheet had been filed within seven days and the trial concluded within one month. Referring to the current case, the minister said: "The government wants to set an example through the trial of Ramisa's murder case... We will take all possible steps to ensure a speedy trial."

Home Minister Salahuddin Ahmed, at a press conference at the Secretariat on the same day, confirmed that the charge sheet would be submitted promptly and said he could guarantee that "an exemplary trial will be completed in the shortest possible time." He stated that the government had compiled a list of prominent pending and recent cases — including those of Ramisa, Asiya of Magura, Tanu of Comilla, and several others with the aim of securing expedited proceedings in each. He also cautioned against hasty legislation driven by public anger, advocating instead for expanding the existing Women and Children Repression Prevention Courts rather than creating new structures.

== Trial ==
The trial for this case began on 1 June 2026 at the Metropolitan Sessions Judge's Court in Dhaka. Outside the court, the prime accused claimed that he did not kill the victim but admitted to raping her. He also stated that he was bribed to commit the act and named an unidentified person as the actual killer. Sohel asserted that his wife is innocent. However, the investigating officer denied these claims, stating that the accused is making them to delay the trial.

On 7 June, the Dhaka Metropolitan Child Violence Prevention Tribunal court sentenced Sohel Rana and his wife to death.

== Reaction ==
=== Government response ===
Prime Minister Tarique Rahman visited the victim's family at their home in Mirpur-11 on the night of 21 May 2026, accompanied by Home Minister Salahuddin Ahmed, Law Minister Md Asaduzzaman, Youth and Sports State Minister Aminul Haque, and other senior officials. He extended condolences to the family, assured them that necessary steps would be taken to ensure a speedy trial, and announced that he would personally assume responsibility for the future welfare and education of Ramisa's older sister, Raisa.

=== Protests and public response ===
Members of the Bangladesh cricket community responded to the killing on social media. Bangladesh Test captain Najmul Hossain Shanto, T20I captain Litton Das and wicketkeeper-batter Mushfiqur Rahim shared condolences posts with sketch of Ramisa. The Bangladesh Cricket Board (BCB) posted a statement on social media saying it was "deeply shocked and outraged at the heinous crime."

==== Demonstrations ====
Public protests began on 19 May 2026 and continued for at least three consecutive days. Students, parents, teachers, and political activists gathered near the victim's residence and Pallabi Police Station, carrying placards reading "We want justice" and "Justice" for Ramisa," and demanding the death penalty for the accused and a trial through a special tribunal.

On 21 May, victim's classmates and residents blocked Kalshi Road, disrupting traffic in surrounding areas. Later the same evening, protesters blocked the main roundabout at Mirpur 10; law enforcement was deployed to the area, and some vehicles were reported to have been damaged. Students from multiple institutions participated, including those of Eden College, Nalonda High School of Chhayanaut, and the student platform Fulkori Asor. A demonstration was also staged in front of the National Museum at Shahbagh under the banner "Justice for Ramisa," where participants chanted slogans calling for the death penalty for perpetrators of child rape and murder.

Protests were reported at Comilla University and in multiple districts outside Dhaka including Bagerhat, Sherpur, Barishal, Rangpur, and Chattogram.

=== Political and organisational reactions ===
UNICEF Representative in Bangladesh, Rana Flowers, issued a statement regarding the case, calling for an end to violence against children and requesting that media entities respect the family's privacy. Ain o Salish Kendra (ASK) and the Human Rights Support Society (HRSS), issued statements identifying the event as reflective of systemic gaps in the domestic child protection framework. A coalition of non-governmental organizations including Manusher Jonno Foundation, Save the Children, Plan International, Oxfam, WaterAid Bangladesh and the JAAGO Foundation jointly requested the establishment of independent child welfare departments. The International Society for Human Rights (ISHR) also published a report using this case to highlight broader safety risks for minors and institutional child abuse in Bangladesh, while tracking the state's judicial response to the incident.

BNP reserved-seat lawmaker Sanjida Islam Tulee visited the victim's family and pledged to assist in ensuring a speedy trial. The Dhaka north units of Jamaat-e-Islami's women's wing and the National Citizen Party staged separate protests.

== See also ==
- Rape in Bangladesh
- 2025 Magura child rape case
- Murder of Sohagi Jahan Tonu
