= Murder of Hena Akhter =

2011 rape and extrajudicial murder case in Bangladesh

- Court: Women and Children Repression Prevention Tribunal
- Started: 1 February 2011 (initial murder case filed), 11 February 2011 (fresh case filed).
- Decided: Pending
- Charge: Murder, rape, abduction, torture, hatching conspiracy, and holding unlawful assembly.

Case history
- Prior actions: Suo moto rule by the Bangladesh High Court ordering body exhumation and second autopsy; Confessional statements recorded before the Shariatpur Chief Judicial Magistrate's Court.

Court membership
- Judges sitting: Justice AHM Shamsuddin Chowdhury Manik and Justice Sheikh Md Zakir Hossain.

Laws applied
- Penal Code, 1860 and Women and Children Repression Prevention Act, 2000.

Area of law
- Criminal law, Women and children's rights, Extrajudicial punishment (Fatwa).

The Murder of Hena Akhter was the rape and killing of a 14-year-old girl in the Shariatpur District of Bangladesh in 2011. She died after being publicly whipped following a fatwa issued by an illegal village arbitration council.

== Background ==
=== Victim ===
Hena Akhter was a 14-year-old girl living in the village of Chamta, located in the Naria Upazila of the Shariatpur District. She was the youngest of four children, having three older sisters and a brother. Her father, Darbesh Khan, was a farmer and day-laborer. Her mother was Akleema Begum.

They lived in a mud and plank house situated within a cluster of homes owned by relatives. Chamta was a remote village, lacked electricity and running water and required a 30-minute walk through the paddies to reach the nearest paved road.

=== Perpetrator and prior harassment ===
The primary perpetrator of the initial assault, Mahbub Khan aged 40 was Hena's married cousin and neighbor. His residence was situated directly opposite Hena's family home, approximately 25 meters away.

Mahbub Khan was married to Shilpi Begum. According to local villagers, their marriage was arranged through a village arbitration approximately 15 to 20 years prior, after Mahbub Khan had allegedly raped Shilpi Begum, leaving marriage as the resolution for the families.

Prior to the incident in January 2011, Mahbub Khan had a documented history of stalking and harassing Hena. According to Hena's sister, Rehana, Mahbub Khan followed the teenager on her way to school and pressured her to meet with him. Hena's family maintained that she rejected his advances. This harassment had previously been the subject of two separate village arbitrations. In the first arbitration, Mahbub Khan was physically reprimanded for his behavior. Approximately six months before Hena's death, a second arbitration was convened for the same reason, which resulted in Mahbub Khan being fined Tk 75,000 for his continued harassment of the minor. Despite these interventions, the stalking persisted.

The situation involved domestic tensions within Mahbub's household. His wife, Shilpi Begum, experienced anxiety over the dynamic, fearing that her husband would take Hena as a second wife. These factors and the proximity of the two households preceded the subsequent dispute.

== The Incident ==
=== Assault and rape ===
On 23 January 2011, Hena Akhter went outside her home to use the bathroom. She was intercepted by her cousin, Mahbub Khan, who gagged her, moved her to an abandoned house, and raped her. Hearing Hena's screams, Mahbub's wife, Shilpi Begum, arrived at the scene with her elder sister Jahanara and aunt-in-law Morsheda. The women moved Hena into Mahbub's house and beat her. During the assault, Hena sustained injuries, including trauma below her left eye. Her father, Darbesh Khan, located and rescued his daughter from the residence. Due to a lack of financial resources and direct intimidation from the perpetrators against seeking outside help, Hena's family did not take her to a hospital that night. She remained at home with severe bleeding and physical pain.

=== Village arbitration (shalish) ===
On 24 January 2011, Shilpi Begum called an illegal village arbitration council (shalish) on the verandah of Mahbub's house to deal with the assault. Bypassing official local authorities, the panel consisted of Shilpi Begum's family members, in-laws, and two local clerics: madrasa teacher Maulana Saiful and mosque imam Hafez Mofiz. Because Hena could not walk due to her injuries, her parents carried her the 25 meters from their home to the council. During the meeting, Shilpi accused Hena of starting the act, and used the gathering to get an official deed from Mahbub transferring 18 decimals of land and a tin-shed house to her name. When Darbesh Khan objected to the meeting, Shilpi's brother, Akkas Meermalot, stated that the incident should be judged under Sharia law.

The council, led by Maulana Saiful, then issued a fatwa convicting both individuals of adultery. Even though the Supreme Court of Bangladesh had previously ruled extrajudicial physical punishments under fatwas illegal, Hena Akhter was sentenced to 101 lashes and Mahbub Khan was sentenced to 200 lashes. To carry out the punishment, a wet cotton towel (gamchha) was twisted into a tight rope and knotted at one end. Mahbub Khan's father, Robiul Khan, was told to lash his son; however, Mahbub Khan ran away from the gathering after receiving between four and twelve lashes.

In contrast, Hena's flogging was carried out by Shilpi Begum's sister-in-law, Monimala, who whipped Hena while her legs were tied. She fell down after 30 lashes, but was forced back to her feet to continue, ultimately receiving between 40 and 80 lashes before losing consciousness. After the punishment, she was bleeding from her nose, ears, and mouth, and her parents carried her back to their home. Hena remained in bed and continued bleeding, but her family did not immediately seek medical care because the perpetrators threatened them.

On 25 January, she was admitted to Shariatpur Sadar Hospital. During her stay, people involved in the arbitration, including local Union Council member Idris Sheikh, accused Darbesh Khan of keeping her there to get money and threatened to file criminal cheating charges against him. To pay for the medical treatment, Darbesh Khan borrowed Tk 40,000 from a local bank and relatives. Following pressure and interference from Idris Sheikh regarding police contact, the family took Hena out of the hospital and returned to their village on 30 January at around 1:00 p.m. On 31 January, her condition got worse. She was taken to the Mulfatganj Upazila Health Complex at around 8:00 p.m., where doctors pronounced her dead. After her death, Idris Sheikh told Darbesh Khan to leave Hena Akhter's corpse at the house of Mahbub Khan.

== Aftermath ==
On 1 February 2011, Sub-Inspector Aslam Uddin of the Naria Police Station went to Mahbub Khan's house to write the first police inquest report. During the inquest, Darbesh Khan told the police that his daughter had been tied up and raped by Mahbub Khan before the lashing. However, police officers, including Sub-Inspector Aslam Uddin and Inspector Mirza AK Azad, hid these claims. The police inquest report left out all mentions of rape or physical beating, and instead focused on claims of adultery to change the direction of the investigation. Hena's father filed a murder case against 18 people on 1 February, but police used his illiteracy to ignore the rape claims in the official case files.

Hena's corpse was sent to Shariatpur Sadar Hospital for the first autopsy. It was done by a medical board made up of Dr. Nirmal Chandra Das, Dr. Rajesh Majumder, and Dr. Hosne Ara Begum. The autopsy report concluded that there were no signs of external or internal injuries on the body. The High Court later found this report to be fabricated. Dr. Nirmal Chandra Das, the residential medical officer, claimed that Hena Akhter died from convulsions caused by hysteria rather than physical injury. The Civil Surgeon of Shariatpur, Golam Sarwar, later tried to explain the wrong autopsy to the High Court by claiming that the local hospital staff had less experience than doctors in Dhaka. Following the first autopsy, Hena was buried in her family's graveyard in Chamta village on the afternoon of 1 February 2011.

== Judicial proceedings ==
On 7 February 2011, an investigative report by The Daily Star showed that the first police inquest and hospital autopsy left out the signs of trauma on Hena's body. This led a High Court bench, made up of Justice AHM Shamsuddin Chowdhury Manik and Justice Sheikh Md Zakir Hossain, to issue a suo sponte rule. The court ordered her body to be dug up for a new autopsy at Dhaka Medical College Hospital, which confirmed she died from homicidal injuries. The High Court criticized the local medical board, telling the Shariatpur civil surgeon that they were playing with the law and people's lives by giving a fake report. The bench ordered the Health Secretary and the Director General of Health to set up a committee to investigate the doctors for negligence and hiding evidence. The court also ordered the Inspector General of Police to take legal and departmental action against Sub-Inspectors Aslam Uddin and Mirza AK Azad for changing the first case report and death inquest. Additionally, the court told the government to start an awareness campaign in mosques, madrasas, and union councils to state that extrajudicial fatwas are criminal offenses.

Following public reaction and court pressure, police began arresting the suspects. Mahbub Khan was arrested on 9 February 2011 in Savar. Other figures, including his wife Shilpi Begum, union council member Idris Sheikh, and the local clerics, were also taken into custody. After five days in detention, Mahbub gave a confession before the Shariatpur Chief Judicial Magistrate's Court, admitting his role. Idris Sheikh also confessed to his involvement in issuing the fatwa. While Hena's father had filed an initial murder case against 18 people on 1 February that did not include the rape claims, Hena Akhter's mother filed a second case under High Court orders on 11 February 2011 against the same 18 people. This second case officially added charges of rape, abduction, unlawful assembly, conspiracy, and torture. The Criminal Investigation Department (CID) took over both cases.

On 7 July 2012, the CID submitted formal charge sheets, adding eight more people to the accused list, many of whom were relatives of Hena's family. The murder trial went to the Shariatpur District and Sessions Judge Court, while the rape case went to the Women and Children Repression Prevention Tribunal, but the legal proceedings slowed down over the following years. By 2014, the main accused, including Mahbub Khan and Shilpi Begum, got bail from the High Court, while ten other suspects remained missing. Hena's family stated that the accused used their freedom to threaten them and pressure them to drop the cases, and the addition of their own relatives to the CID chargesheet put further pressure on the family. Lacking resources, Hena's parents and key witnesses stopped going to the court hearings. Because they did not appear, the courts issued arrest warrants between late 2016 and early 2017 against her parents and other family witnesses for failing to testify.

== Reaction ==
Following investigative press reports, the Bangladesh High Court issued a suo sponte rule directing the Shariatpur Deputy Commissioner, the Superintendent of Police, and the Naria subdistrict chief executive officer to explain their failure to protect the victim. The court ordered the Ministry of Religious Affairs and the Ministry of Information and Broadcasting to run a nationwide media campaign declaring extrajudicial fatwas and physical punishments illegal. It also directed the Inspector General of Police to take departmental action against the local officers who altered the initial case files.

The incident caused national outrage, leading to rallies and human chains across the country. In Shariatpur, local chapters of Shusashoner Jonno Nagorik, and the district Human Rights Commission protested outside the Deputy Commissioner's office. Members of the Sammilita Nari Samaj also formed a human chain at the victim's village to demand punishments for the rapist and the clerics.

Human rights groups, including Ain o Salish Kendra and the Bangladesh Shishu Adhikar Forum, released statements condemning the death and demanding an end to illegal village arbitrations. The Bangladesh National Women Lawyers Association represented the family in court, with lawyer Salma Ali stating that the case showed systematic violence and collusion between police and hospital staff. Lawyer and Human rights activist Nur Khan Liton called the murder a horrific crime that showed the continued presence of groups carrying out torture despite judicial bans. Fazlul Huq of the Madaripur Legal Aid Association noted that while up to 80 percent of rural disputes are settled by informal councils because the formal judiciary is costly, these groups have no legal authority to order physical punishments.

== See also ==
- Murder of Sohagi Jahan Tonu
- Shazneen Tasnim Rahman murder
- Murder of Yasmin Akhter
- 2026 Pallabi child rape and murder case
