= 2025 Magura child rape case =

2025 assault and rape in Bangladesh

Magura Child Rape Case
- Court: Women and Children Repression Prevention Tribunal

Court membership
- Judge sitting: Sabyasachi Ray
- Chief judge: Abdul Matin

Laws applied
- Section 9(4)(k) of the Women and Children Repression Prevention Act

In March 2025, an eight-year-old girl was raped in Magura Sadar Upazila, Magura District, Bangladesh, and subsequently died. The incident occurred while she was visiting her elder sister's home during the month of Ramadan. The case received national and international attention, sparking widespread protests across Bangladesh. The main accused has been sentenced to capital punishment for this incident.

== Background and events ==
The victim was an eight-year-old Bengali Muslim girl who was a third-grade student living in Jaria, a village in Sreepur of Magura District. On 5 March 2025, she had gone to visit her elder sister's house in Nijananduali, a village in Magura Sadar Upazila of the same district, to spend the Eid-ul-Fitr holidays, where her elder sister had been betrothed four months ago. The assault reportedly occurred between the night of March 5 and the morning of 6 March 2025. According to reports, the victim went to sleep alongside her elder sister at 10:00 PM BST on March 5. At 2:30 AM on March 6, the elder sister awoke to find her sister missing from her side. After searching, she found her younger sister lying unconscious near the house. The victim later stated that her brother-in-law assisted by unlocking the door, which allowed his father to enter and rape her. She reported being forcibly taken to another room, gagged when she was raped, and then left unconscious.

The victim was eventually taken to a local hospital in Magura after she complained of abdominal pains in her private parts in the presence of a neighbour (who came in after hearing the commotion caused by the accused brother-in-law physically assaulting the victim's sister in order to silence her), where the sister's mother-in-law allegedly attempted to mislead medical professionals regarding the nature of the child's injuries and claimed that the child had been possessed. But the medical professionals realised what had happened and contacted the victim's mother, who visited the hospital alongside her husband. The victim's parents and elder sister then proceeded to lodge a police complaint against the accused family at Magura Sadar Thana at 3:00 AM. As news of the incident spread, the victim (whose condition gradually worsened) was admitted first to Faridpur Medical College and Hospital, then to the Dhaka Medical College and Hospital in the national capital of Dhaka. The government arranged for her treatment at Combined Military Hospital on March 8, where she suffered multiple cardiac arrests. She died on 13 March 2025, at around 1:00 PM BST.

== Accused ==
Following the report, Magura police promptly arrested four individuals :

- Hitu Sheikh (Bengali: হিটু শেখ), aged 50, a mason by profession, the father-in-law of the victim's elder sister and primary accused. He was accused under Sections 9(4)(A) and 30 of the Women and Children Repression Prevention Act, 2000. Reports stated that he had a history of assaulting multiple women, including his neighbours, his own daughter, and daughter-in-law (the victim's elder sister) in the past.
- Wife of the primary accused, aged 40, accused of destroying evidence of the crime.
- Son of the primary accused, and the victim's brother-in-law, aged 20, accused of criminal intimidation.
- Other son of the primary accused, aged 25, accused of criminal intimidation.

Law Adviser Asif Nazrul announced that the trial was expected to begin within a week, with necessary preparations underway, including the collection of DNA samples and recording of witness statements. The High Court has directed the Women and Child Repression Prevention Tribunal to complete the trial within 180 days.

== Trial ==
Hitu Sheikh was presented before the senior judicial magistrate Abdul Matin on 10 March, where he was given a 7-day police remand. On 15 March, he confessed to the act and pleaded guilty before senior judicial magistrate Sabyasachi Ray. On 17 May, Hitu Sheikh was sentenced to death by the Women & Child Repression Prevention Tribunal, while the other 3 were acquitted.

== Protests ==
Protests responding to the event witnessed significant participation from various segments of society, including teachers and students from the University of Dhaka. Students at Dhaka University formed anti-rape protests, issuing a 24-hour ultimatum for the execution of the accused. A rally was held where female students marched from various dormitories to the Raju Memorial Sculpture of TSC. The National Citizen Party issued a statement denouncing the incident, calling for a comprehensive investigation into cases of rape and abuse.

Thousands of people, including interim government advisors Farida Akhter and Sarjis Alam, alongside NCP leader Nahid Islam, assembled to attend the victim's namaz-e-janaza. An enraged mob burnt down the house of the accused on the very same day. A gayebana janaza was conducted at the premises of Dhaka University by student activists from the Bangladesh Nationalist Party, Bangladesh Jamaat-e-Islami, and National Citizen Party in the presence of VC Niaz Ahmed Khan. Similar gayebana janazas were conducted in various locations of Dhaka and the nation, like the Shaheed Minar, Jagannath University, Government Bangla College, Islamic University, Comilla University, Jessore Science and Technology University, and Begum Rokeya University. Protest marches and meetings were also organised in cities like Chittagong, Barishal, Satkhira, and Habiganj, where demands for the death penalty of the convicted were raised.

In Rangpur, a candlelight protest was held demanding swift justice for the victim and protesting ongoing incidents of violence against women and children nationwide due to the collapse of the law and order following the overthrow of the previous government in August 2024.

The Bangladesh Ganatantrik Chhatra Sangsad demanded the resignation of home affairs advisor Major (Retd) Jahangir Alam Choudhury for this incident. Bangladesh Nationalist Party leader Mirza Fakhrul Islam Alamgir also criticised the ineptitude of the interim government in quelling crimes against women in the country. Shafiqur Rahman, emir of the Bangladesh Jamaat-e-Islami, visited the victim's house, blamed the incident on moral degradation purportedly caused by Indian television serials, and claimed that a strict enforcement of morality under sharia was the need of the hour to prevent such incidents. He also demanded that the trial must be completed within 90 days.

== Reactions ==
=== Government ===
- Chief Adviser: Muhammad Yunus expressed deep shock and sorrow over the incident and ordered a speedy trial.

=== Non-governmental organizations ===
- UNICEF: Rana Flowers, the representative of UNICEF Bangladesh, expressed her horror at the alarming rise in reported cases of sexual violence against children and urged the interim government and law enforcement to ensure immediate action.
- Save the Children, Breaking the Silence, Plan International, Ain o Salish Kendra, and Manusher Jonno Foundation held a joint press conference and expressed their concerns about the incident. They also expressed several demands from the government, including strengthening the justice system, holding the perpetrators accountable, and making the issues of safety and exploitation from sexual violence a priority in their agenda.

== See also ==
- Rape of Purnima Rani Shil
- Murder of Yasmin Akhter
