= Tabarak Husain =

Bangladeshi diplomat (1924–2018)

- তবারক হুসাইন

Ambassador of Bangladesh to the United States
- In office 2 October 1978 – 19 May 1982
- Preceded by: Mustafizur Rahman Siddiqi
- Succeeded by: Humayun Rashid Choudhury

Foreign Secretary of Bangladesh
- In office November 15, 1975 – September 6, 1978
- President: Ziaur Rahman
- Vice President: Abdus Sattar (1977–1978)
- Preceded by: Fakhruddin Ahmed
- Succeeded by: Shah A M S Kibria

Personal details
- Born: 6 April 1924 Noakhali, Bengal Presidency, British India
- Died: 29 April 2018 (aged 94) Washington, D.C., United States
- Resting place: Parklawn Memorial Gardens, Rockville
- Spouse: Uzra Husain
- Children: 3
- Parents: Maulvi Badiuzzaman (father); Anjuman Ara Begum (mother)
- Relatives: Amin Ahmed (father-in-law); Maksum-ul-Hakim (brother-in-law); Tariq ul Hakim (nephew-in-law)
- Education: University of Dhaka; London School of Economics
- Awards: Sitara-i-Khidmat (Star of Service) (1968)

Tabarak Husain (6 April 1924 – 29 April 2018) was a Bangladeshi career diplomat. He was a foreign secretary of Bangladesh from 1975 to 1978. He also held the position of chairman of Sadharan Bima Corporation and Grameen Bank.

== Early life and education ==
Husain completed his undergraduate degree and post graduation in Economics from University of Dhaka in 1942. He then obtained his postgraduate degree in International Relations from London School of Economics, United Kingdom in 1949.

== Personal life ==
Husain married Uzra Husain (d. 2011), daughter of Justice Amin Ahmed. Several of Uzra's sisters were married to Pakistani foreign service officers. They had three sons Riaz Husain, Jamil Husain and Taher Husain.

== Career ==
=== Pakistan period ===
Husain joined the Pakistan Foreign Service as a member of the first regular batch in 1949. He served in different positions in the Pakistan diplomatic missions in India, The Netherlands, United Kingdom and Thailand. He was acting high commissioner of Pakistan in New Delhi from 1961 to 1964. In 1968, he was appointed as director general in the Pakistan Ministry of Foreign Affairs with Ambassadorial rank. He was appointed as ambassador to Algeria in 1971 but due to Independence movement of Bangladesh, he was detained in Karachi, Pakistan. He accompanied Zulfikar Ali Bhutto on a state delegation to Peking (present Beijing) in November 1971.

=== Bangladesh period ===
Husain was repatriated from Pakistan in late 1973. Since then he worked in Ministry of Foreign Affairs in various positions. He was reportedly selected to be Bangladesh's ambassador to Cairo before the coup of August 15. He served as Foreign Secretary, of Government of Bangladesh from 15 November 1975 to 6 September 1978. During the period, he visited summit level meetings in nine countries on bilateral visits. He also visited Moscow twice in November 1975 and 1976 as a single member delegation to discuss bilateral issues. For the period of 1978–1982, He was ambassador of Bangladesh to United States of America. In his tenure, President Ziaur Rahman visited in United States in 1980. Husain signed the Nuclear Non-Proliferation Treaty for Bangladesh on 5 October 1979. Later, he was the chairman of Sadharan Bima Corporation from 1995 to 1996 and Grameen Bank from 2003 to 2010.

== Writing ==
Husain authored Serving the Nation: Reflections of Bangladesh Diplomats, a compilation of the memoirs of 43 career diplomats.

== Awards ==
Husain was awarded the Sitara-i-Khidmat (Star of Service) honor by Pakistan in 1968.

== Death ==
Husain died at the age of 94 at his sleep on 29 April 2018 in Rockville near Washington, DC.
