= Hridoy =

Hridoy (Bengali: হৃদয়; from Sanskrit Hr̥daya, 'Heart') is a Bengali given name and a surname. Notable people with the name include:

- Hridoy Khan (born 1991), Bangladeshi singer
- Tawhid Hridoy (born 2000), Bangladeshi cricketer
- Shibli Sadiq Hridoy, Bangladeshi murder victim
