= Rape in Bangladesh =

Rape (Bengali: ধর্ষণ, romanized: dhôrṣôṇ, or Bengali: বলাৎকার, romanized: bôlātkār) is a significant human rights and legal issue within Bangladesh. Under Bangladeshi law, rape of women and children is a criminal offense and punishable by the death penalty. However, rape of males is not legally recognized in the country.

== History ==
=== During the Liberation War ===
During the Bangladesh Liberation War in 1971, the Pakistani Forces and Razakar paramilitary forces systematically raped between 200,000 and 400,000 Bengali women and girls as part of their genocidal campaign. Both Bengali Muslim and Hindu women were targeted, with the perpetrators aiming to "cleanse" the nation of perceived corruption. Many victims suffered severe consequences, including pregnancies, abortions, and suicides, while others fled to India. This violence is one of the most extreme cases of wartime sexual violence, ending only after the surrender of the Pakistani military in December 1971.

== Legal framework ==
Section 375 of Chapter XVI of the Bangladesh Penal Code defines rape. It is classified as rape when a man engages in sexual intercourse with a woman against her will or without her consent. This includes situations where consent is obtained by instilling fear, by falsely pretending to be in a marriage that the woman believes to be real, or when the woman is under fourteen years of age. The only exception is if the woman is his wife and if she is not under thirteen; it is not considered rape. In this law, penetration is sufficient to constitute sexual intercourse necessary for the offence of rape.

Section 376 of the penal code states that the punishment for rape is life imprisonment or up to ten years in prison, along with a fine. If the victim is the perpetrator's wife and not under twelve years old, the punishment is reduced to up to two years in prison, a fine, or both.

However, most rape cases in Bangladesh are filed under the Nari O Shishu Nirjaton Daman Ain, 2000 (Bengali: নারী ও শিশু নির্যাতন দমন আইন, lit. 'Women and Children Torture Prevention Act'). Under this law, the punishment for rape can include either capital punishment or life imprisonment, along with a fine. In cases of gang rape, each perpetrator may also face the death penalty or life imprisonment, along with a fine. Attempting to commit murder or cause injury following a rape carries the same penalties. The law also addresses incidents of rape that occur in jail, holding on-duty officers accountable, and the punishment includes a prison term of five to ten years.

=== Male rape ===
Under Section 375 of the Penal Code, 1860, the definition of rape is explicitly gendered, recognizing only men as perpetrators and only women as victims. The Nari O Shishu Nirjaton Daman Ain, 2000, however, protects boys under the age of sixteen; however, it does not recognize the rape of adult men. As a result, male victims of sexual assault seek legal recourse under Section 377 of the penal code, which criminalizes "unnatural offenses". Penetration is considered sufficient for defining carnal intercourse as an offense in this section. However, the lack of clarity regarding its definition and degree may allow offenders to evade accountability. Legal scholars have criticized Section 377 because it does not differentiate between consensual acts and non-consensual sexual assault, emphasizing that it was intended to criminalize homosexuality rather than to protect male rape victims.

In 2021, activists filed a writ to the Supreme Court, demanding the inclusion of male rape as a crime. In 2022, the High Court questioned why the definition of rape in the Bangladesh Penal Code had not been amended to provide legal protection for both male and female victims, and issued a rule to amend section 375 of the Penal Code to include "rape of males" and "rape of others" as a crime and punishable offence. However, there has been no progress on this issue since that time.

The penal code of Bangladesh also fails to provide legal protection to transgender, intersex, or hijra people who are victims of sexual assault.

== Statistics ==
Region breakdown based on an analysis of 8,067 reported sexual assault cases in Bangladesh (2012–2025): 0 – 49 50 – 99 100 –199 200 – 399 400+

The statistical data on rape in Bangladesh show variation. According to data from Odhikar, at least 14,718 individuals (including 6,900 women and 7,664 children) were raped between 2001 and 2019 in Bangladesh, and 2,823 cases involved gang rape. According to a report by UN Women Asia and the Pacific, from January to September 2015, a total of 3,336 women and girls were raped, with 158 of the 826 cases involving gang rape. Between 2013 and September 2017, 86% of rape victims were under the age of 18, and 49% of these victims were girls aged between 7 and 12 years.

In 2025, the Bangladesh Mahila Parishad reported that 786 women and girls were victims of rape and gang rape, an increase from 516 in 2024. Among these, 543 were girls under 18. Gang rapes accounted for 179 of these incidents. According to data from the police, 7,068 rape cases were filed in 2025, of which 5,171 involved adult women and 1,897 children. Bangladesh Mahila Parishad recorded 31 cases in January 2026.

According to Ain o Salish Kendra, between January and April in 2026, 180 women reported being raped. Among these victims, 16 were under six years old, and 40 were under twelve. Out of these cases, 144 women filed a case. Additionally, 17 women were murdered following the rapes, and there were 44 reported attempts of rape.

A 2013 United Nations study found that approximately 4.7% of men in Bangladesh reported experiencing sexual victimization, including rape by another man. In 2023–2024, there were reports of 111 boys being raped. According to Ain o Salish Kendra, only 55 of these cases were officially reported. In 2025, the organization reported 48 cases of boy rape. And between January and April 2026, it reported 15 cases of boy rape.

According to a survey conducted by The Daily Star, out of 680 reported incidents of rape, 186 occurred in the victim's home, 179 took place at the perpetrator's place, 96 happened in open areas, and 95 in abandoned places. Additionally, there were 15 incidents in schools, 28 in madrasahs, and 10 in mosques. The same survey reported that out of 8,067 cases reported between 2012 and 2025, with the Dhaka division having the highest number at 2,531 incidents, followed by Chattogram and Rajshahi, while the Sylhet division reported the least with 411 cases. At the district level, Dhaka led with 913 cases, followed by Chattogram and Narayanganj. At the subdistrict level, Savar reported the highest number of rape cases.

== Societal impact and stigma ==
=== Impact on female victims ===
Victims of child rape are mostly from marginalized socio-demographic backgrounds. Many of these victims live in rural areas and belong to economically disadvantaged families. Additionally, both the victims and their families face social stigmatization, which includes negative attitudes, social isolation, and societal pressure. This stigma can also restrict their access to formal education.

Victim-blaming culture is also an issue that blames the victim for her clothes, the place, the time, and who she was with. There is another stereotype that women who engage freely with men, work outside the home, travel at night, or defy societal norms should expect to be assaulted. Victims of rape often fear speaking up due to concerns about justice, procedural delays, and the risk of lifelong humiliation from their families, communities, and law enforcement, which is considered a major reason for the underreporting of such cases.

Sometimes rapists from influential backgrounds may use their political power to force the victims to withdraw their cases. Another issue is rape marriage, where arrangements are often made across the country through village arbitration or family negotiations. Girls who are forced to marry their alleged rapists through these informal settlements frequently face further abuse, divorce, or unstable marriages. Some families said that they agreed to these arrangements out of fear of social stigma. Parents of adolescent and young girls who became pregnant as a result of rape stated that there was "no option but marriage.

=== Impact on male victims ===
The legal framework surrounding rape has been worsened by societal stigma related to masculinity and victimhood. The belief that men cannot be violated due to perceived biological superiority leads to disbelief from law enforcement in reported cases. This stigma prevents male victims from disclosing their experiences, isolating them from seeking justice. Additionally, the legal code does not recognize male rape victims as part of the defined "victim groups", leaving them without targeted services or support.

Men are generally less likely to report incidents of rape. Tania Haque, a professor at the University of Dhaka, has identified the "masculinity crisis" as a contributing factor. She explained that many men feel that being raped challenges their masculinity, leading to a sense of "loss of manliness". The "man up" attitude pushes men to hide their emotions and follow strict masculine norms, leading to shame and guilt for being victims. As a result, many instances of sexual abuse against men go unreported and unnoticed.

Male rape is often trivialized and dismissed as a joke in Bangladeshi society. A common stereotype suggests that "real men" are tough and able to defend themselves, which can make victims reluctant to speak out. Most male victims blame themselves. As a result, the trauma they experience can last a long time. Victims of such crimes frequently face humiliation and belittlement, with social media platforms flooded with "ha ha" reactions and mocking comments that worsen the survivor's trauma. As a result, society often struggles to acknowledge that men can also be victims of sexual abuse. Consequently, many male survivors opt to remain silent, fearing mockery. This is one of the primary reasons why male rape is underreported.

== Responses ==
Following a rigorous campaign by rights groups, the High Court issued a directive definitively banning the two-finger test on rape survivors in medical examinations. In 2020, the Nari O Shishu Nirjaton Daman Ain, 2000, was amended to include the death penalty as the maximum punishment for all types of rape, following a protest. In the aftermath of the Magura child rape case in 2025, the investigation period for rape cases was shortened to 15 days, and trials were mandated to conclude within 90 days. Also, the requirement for DNA proof as mandatory evidence to initiate a trial was eliminated.

== See also ==
- Rape by gender
- Rape statistics
- Rape culture
- Prostitution in Bangladesh
- Male prostitution in Bangladesh
- Suicide in Bangladesh
