= War on drugs (disambiguation) =

The war on drugs is a global campaign led by the United States government against the illegal drug trade.

War on drugs or War against drugs may also refer to:

== Campaigns and Conflicts ==
- 2018–2019 Bangladesh drug war, 2018–2019 campaign against the illegal drug trade by the Bangladeshi government
- Colombian conflict, a low-intensity asymmetric war in Colombia which began in 1964
- Mexican drug war, an asymmetric conflict between the Mexican government and drug cartels since 2006
- Miami drug war, a series of armed conflicts between the United States government and drug cartels in Florida during the 1970s and 1980s
- Philippine drug war, an intensified anti-drug campaign by the Philippine government beginning in 2016

== Music and TV ==
=== Music ===
- The War on Drugs (band), an American rock band from Philadelphia
- "War on Drugs", a song by Barenaked Ladies from Everything to Everyone

=== TV ===
- The War on Drugs (film), a 2007 film documentary about the war on drugs
- The War Against Drugs, a 2009 episode of police procedural comedy-drama New Tricks

== See also ==
- The Civil War on Drugs, a comedy sketch series from the TV show The Whitest Kids U' Know
- Drug wars (disambiguation)
