= Drug wars =

Drug war(s) may refer to:

== Media ==
- Drug War (film), a Chinese-Hong Kong action thriller film
- Drug Wars: The Camarena Story, a 1990 TV mini-series based on Elaine Shannon's book Desperados and the Time article of the same name
- Drug Wars (video game), a turn-based strategy computer game
- "Drug Wars" (Bad Girls), a 1999 television episode

== By country ==
- 2018–2019 Bangladesh drug war, 2018–2019 campaign against drug dealers and users by the government of Bangladesh.
- Ecuadorian drug war, ongoing low-intensity conflict between the Ecuadorian government and drug cartels.
- Mexican drug war, an ongoing asymmetric low-intensity conflict between the Mexican government and various drug trafficking syndicates.
- Philippine drug war, the drug policy of the Philippine government that was started by Former President Rodrigo Duterte.

=== United States ===
- War on drugs, a campaign, led by the U.S. federal government, of drug prohibition, military aid, and military intervention.
- Miami drug war, a series of armed conflicts in the 1970s and 1980s.

== See also ==
- War on drugs (disambiguation)
