= Amin Ahmed (jurist, born 1899) =

Amin Ahmed HPk MBE
- আমিন আহমদ
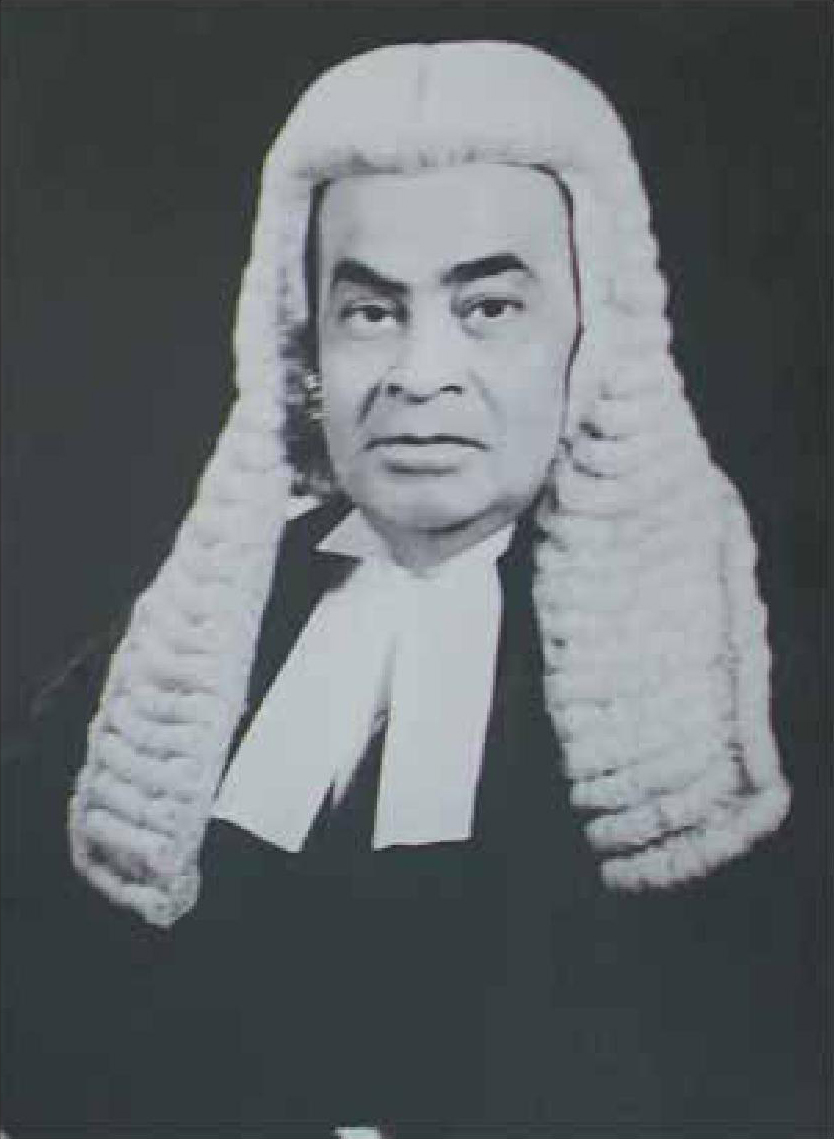

Chief Justice Dacca High Court
- In office 1956–1959

Personal details
- Born: 1 October 1899 Sonagazi, Bengal, British India
- Died: 5 December 1991 (aged 92) Dhaka, Bangladesh
- Children: 7
- Relatives: Tabarak Husain (son-in-law); Maksum-ul-Hakim (son-in-law); Tariq ul Hakim (grandson)
- Education: Presidency College, Calcutta and Cambridge University
- Profession: Judge
- Awards: Member of the Order of the British Empire; Hilal-e-Pakistan

Amin Ahmed HPk MBE (Bengali: আমিন আহমদ; 1 October 1899 – 5 December 1991) was a jurist and chief justice of the Dacca High Court during the Pakistan era.

== Early life and education ==
Amin Ahmed was born on 1 October 1899 in the village of Ahmadpur in Sonagazi, Feni, then part of the Noakhali district of the Bengal Presidency. His father, Abdul Aziz, was a civil servant. In 1913, he graduated from Chittagong Municipal High School. He had a B.A. in economics from Presidency College, Calcutta. He then completed a master's degree in economics. He completed another B.A. in economics and a Bachelor of Laws from University of Cambridge. He was then called to the Gray's Inn and in 1924 became a Barrister-at-Law.

== Career ==
Amin joined the Calcutta High Court bar after returning from London. He then joined Calcutta University Law College as a professor of law. He was appointed temporary judge of the Presidency Small Causes Court in 1929. His position was made permanent in 1932 and also worked as Kolkata's Chief Rent and Rate Controller of the Premises and Hotels. In 1947, he was appointed a Judge in the Calcutta High Court.

After the Partition of India, Amin joined the Dhaka High Court and would be chief justice of Dhaka High Court in 1954. He retired in 1959. He served as the President of the Muslim Marriage Registrars’ Association, Bengal Veternarary College Committee, and Dhaka Club.

Amin was awarded the title of Member of the Order of the British Empire (MBE) by the British Government of India, and Hilal-e-Pakistan (Crescent of Pakistan) by the Pakistan Government for his meritorious services.

=== Writings ===
Amin Ahmed delivered the Kamini Kumar Memorial Law lecture on the topic Judicial Review of Administrative Action in Pakistan which was held in University of Dhaka on 9–11 February 1970. Later the lecture was published as a book. He wrote an autobiography; titled A Peep into the Past.

He gave the inaugural speech at the Pakistan Philosophical Congress in 1954. Ahmed also gave speech on various occasions like the Annual Dinner of the Chittagong District Bar Association in 1964, the inaugural ceremony of the New Dacca High Court Building on 24 March 1968 and the Bar Dinner at Hotel Intercontinental, Dacca on 19 January 1974. He addressed as president, Pakistan United Nations Association (East Zone, Dacca) on the occasion of its silver jubilee in 1970.

== Personal life ==
He had 6 daughters (Shameem, Nessima Hakim, Uzra Husain, Nazneen, Najma, Jarina Mohsin) and one son, Aziz Ahmed. His second daughter, Nessima, was married to Justice Maksum-ul-Hakim, Justice of Bangladesh Supreme Court. He was the father-in-law of Bangladeshi diplomat Tabarak Husain, who married his daughter Uzra Husain.

His grandchild, Tariq ul Hakim, is also a Dhaka High Court justice.

== Death and legacy ==
He died in Dhaka on 5 December 1991. Chief Justice of Bangladesh Surendra Kumar Sinha told judges to follow the example of Amin Ahmed on his 25th death anniversary in 2016. The Justice Amin Ahmed Gold Medal is given by Justice Amin Ahmed Trust.

== See also ==
- Muhammad Habibur Rahman
- Latifur Rahman
- Abu Sadat Mohammad Sayem
