= Murder of Nusrat Jahan Rafi =

Crime in Bangladesh in 2019

Murder of Nusrat Jahan Rafi refers to the murder of a 19–year-old Bangladeshi female student who was murdered after reporting sexual assault by her Madrasa principal to authorities. She was from Feni, Bangladesh. She suffered burns covering over 80% of her body. She died four days after her assault on 10 April 2019 at Dhaka Medical College and Hospital's burn unit. She recorded a statement identifying some of her attackers while in transit to the hospital.

== History ==
The principal of Nusrat Rafi's Madrasa, Siraj Ud Doula had given the order to murder her. She had filled a sexual harassment complaint against him. She had been lured to the Madarasa where there was an attempt to convince her to withdraw the complaint. The assailants poured kerosene on her when she refused to withdraw the complaint.

Rafi's murder was investigated by the Police Bureau of Investigation. She made accusations against her murderers on her deathbed which was recorded by Sonagazi Thana OC, Moazzem Hossain. The video was leaked by that police officer to a journalist who spread the video and it went viral. Moazzem was sentenced to eight years imprisonment for his role in the leak of the video.

== Aftermath ==
After her murder, Prime Minister Sheikh Hasina announced that individuals responsible for the crime would be prosecuted.

On 29 May 2019, the Police Bureau of Investigation (PBI) stated sixteen individuals, including two politicians, were charged with murdering her. They are: Madrassah principal SM Sirajuddowla, Awami League leader Ruhul Amin, Shahadat Hossain Shamim, Nur Uddin, Imran Hossain Mamun, Hafez Abdul Quader, Iftekhar Uddin Rana, Councillor Maksud Alam alias Moksud, Kamrunnahar Moni, Saifur Rahman Mohammad Zobair, Javed, Umme Sultana Popy, Mohiuddin Shakil, Mohammad Shamim, Abdur Rahim Sharif and Absar Uddin.

After a fast-tracked trial at the women and children repression prevention tribunal in Feni, on 24 October 2019, all sixteen, including former members of the school's administration (teachers and pupils) found guilty were sentenced to death.

On 24 August 2026, the high court division of Bangladesh upheld the death sentences of SM Siraj-Ud-Dowlah and Shahadat Hossain Shamim and commuted 4 others to life imprisonment and acquitted 10 others. The high court also ordered the curtailment of original trial judge after accusing it of handing out wholesale death penalties.

== See also ==
- Murder of Sohagi Jahan Tonu
- Border shooting of Felani Khatun
