= Murder of Shibli Sadiq Hridoy =

2023 kidnapping and murder in Bangladesh

Kidnapping and murder of Shibli Sadiq Hridoy
- Location: Bandarban District, Chittagong Division, Bangladesh
- Date: 28 to 29 August 2023

The kidnapping and murder of Shibli Sadiq Hridoy (Bengali: শিবলী সাদিক হৃদয়ের হত্যা) is a murder case which took place in Bandarban, Bangladesh, during the monsoon of 2023, when a young Bengali man named Shibli Sadiq Hridoy was kidnapped and killed by several men from the Marma tribe.

== Background ==
Hridoy was a 20-year-old Bengali whose father was a truck driver. Since his family was very poor, he had started to work in a poultry farm in Kadalpur as a manager, alongside his studies at Kadalpur School and College. On the farm he became friends with several Marma men who also worked there.

== Incident ==
Hridoy was kidnapped on 28 August 2023, at night. Two days later his parents were contacted by the kidnappers who demanded a ransom of 200,000 taka. After paying the ransom they were assured that Hridoy would return by morning, but that did not happen.

They kept waiting, but when there was no sign of Hridoy, they informed the police. The Bangladesh police interrogated six suspects accused by Hridoy's mother Naheed Akhtar to have committed the crime, four of whom later confessed. One of the accused, Umongching Marma, showed the area where Hridoy had been killed. Police officers from the Raozan police station searched the area, but found only fragments of Hridoy's bones as well as his skull. The suspects' names were Umongching Marma, Suichingmung Marma, Angthuimung Marma, and Ukyathawai Marma, all of whom worked at the poultry farm alongside Hridoy.

On 10 September, 46-year-old Umongching Marma was arrested as the suspected mastermind behind the crime, suspected of carrying the main responsibility for planning and executing the crime. The following day, when he was taken to the crime scene, an angry mob of villagers surrounded the police vehicle and lynched him. According to the subsequent police investigation, Umongching Marma had killed Hridoy one day after the kidnapping, before even contacting the parents. He had then completely dismembered the body, separating the flesh from the bones and spreading both throughout the forest, in order to "eliminate all traces" of the crime.

When the police searched the area after his arrest, only bones could be retrieved. Initially there were reports that the suspects had confessed to having cooked and eaten the flesh to reduce the retrievable evidence even further. However, in a press conference on 1 October, the police denied this, declaring that while "the flesh of the body was thrown apart[, t]here was no information on meat eating."

== See also ==
- Crime in Bangladesh
