= Murder of Yasmin Akhter =

1995 rape and murder incident

Yasmin Akhter was a 14-year-old girl whose gang rape and murder by three members of the Bangladesh Police in 1995 caused violent mass protests in Dinajpur.

== History ==
=== Incident ===
Yasmin Akhter was a 14-year-old domestic helper in Dhaka. She was returning to her hometown in Dinajpur on 24 August 1995 when she got on the wrong bus and became lost. She was then offered a lift by three members of the Bangladesh Police in a police van. The officers were later identified as Moinul Hoque, Abdus Sattar, and Amrita Lal. However, instead of taking her home, the three officers then drove Akhter to a secluded spot, where she was gang raped and strangled to death. Her body was then thrown off the side of a road and discovered the next day.

=== Reaction ===
On 25 August 1995, Manoranjan Shill Gopal, the local member of parliament, had informed Matiur Rahman, the editor of the local newspaper, The Daily Uttarbangla, that police had raped and killed a girl. Rahman learned the identity of the victim on 26 August and wanted to publish a news article but he was warned by the police not to. At night, the police cut the electric supply to the news office. Rahman borrowed the electricity of his neighbor and used that to publish the news. Following the publication of the news, mass protest erupted. The local police station was attacked and looted. Curfew was declared and enforced by Bangladesh Rifles personnel in the area. Police fired on protesters killing 7 and injuring about 300 and more people.

=== Trial and legacy ===
Three police officers were accused in the case. Two of the police officers, Moinul Hoque and Abdus Sattar, were arrested in 1997. They were tried and found guilty of rape and murder and sentenced to death by hanging. Amrita Lal was arrested years after the verdict, but also received a death sentence. The trial process had faced resistance from the police, who initially refused to register the case. The government was under pressure from women's rights activists and civil society. Five policemen, including the then police superintendent of Dinajpur and the police officer in charge of the police station, as well as the doctor who performed the first autopsy on the victim were acquitted of destroying evidence in the investigation.

Hoque and Sattar were both executed by hanging from the gallows on 1 September 2004, in Rangpur Central Jail. Later that same month, on 29 September, after his clemency requests were denied, Lal was also executed by hanging from the gallows at Rangpur, though he expressed remorse to the victim's family prior to his death.

24 August is marked as Resistance Day against Repression of Women in Bangladesh.

In 2024, it was reported by The Daily Star that a film about the case, entitled Ami Yasmin Bolchi and starring Bidya Sinha Saha Mim, had been forced to cease production due to pressure from the Dhaka Metropolitan Police.

== See also ==
- Murder of Hena Akhter
- 2026 Pallabi child rape and murder case
