= Hilal-e-Pakistan =

First-highest civilian award of Pakistan

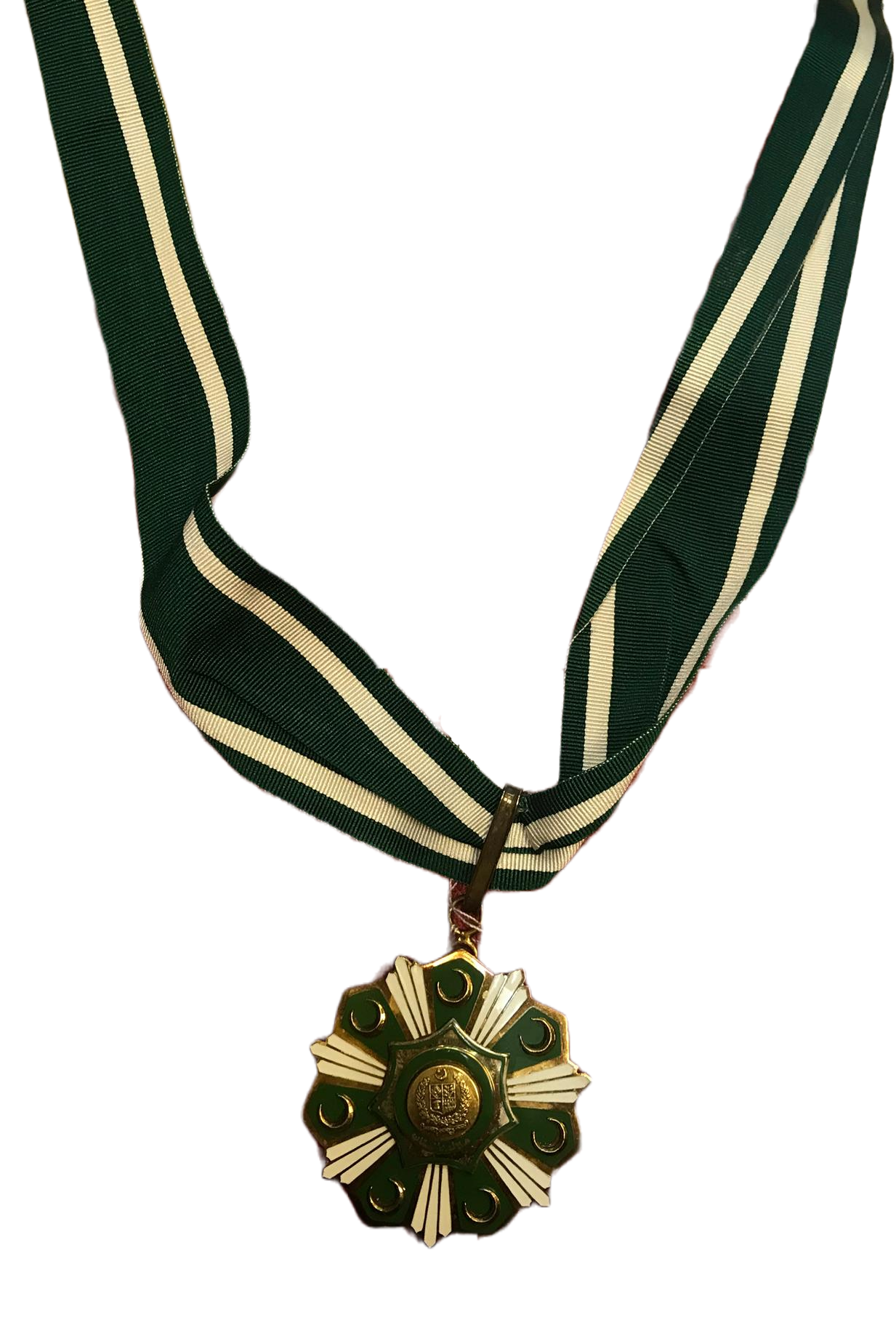
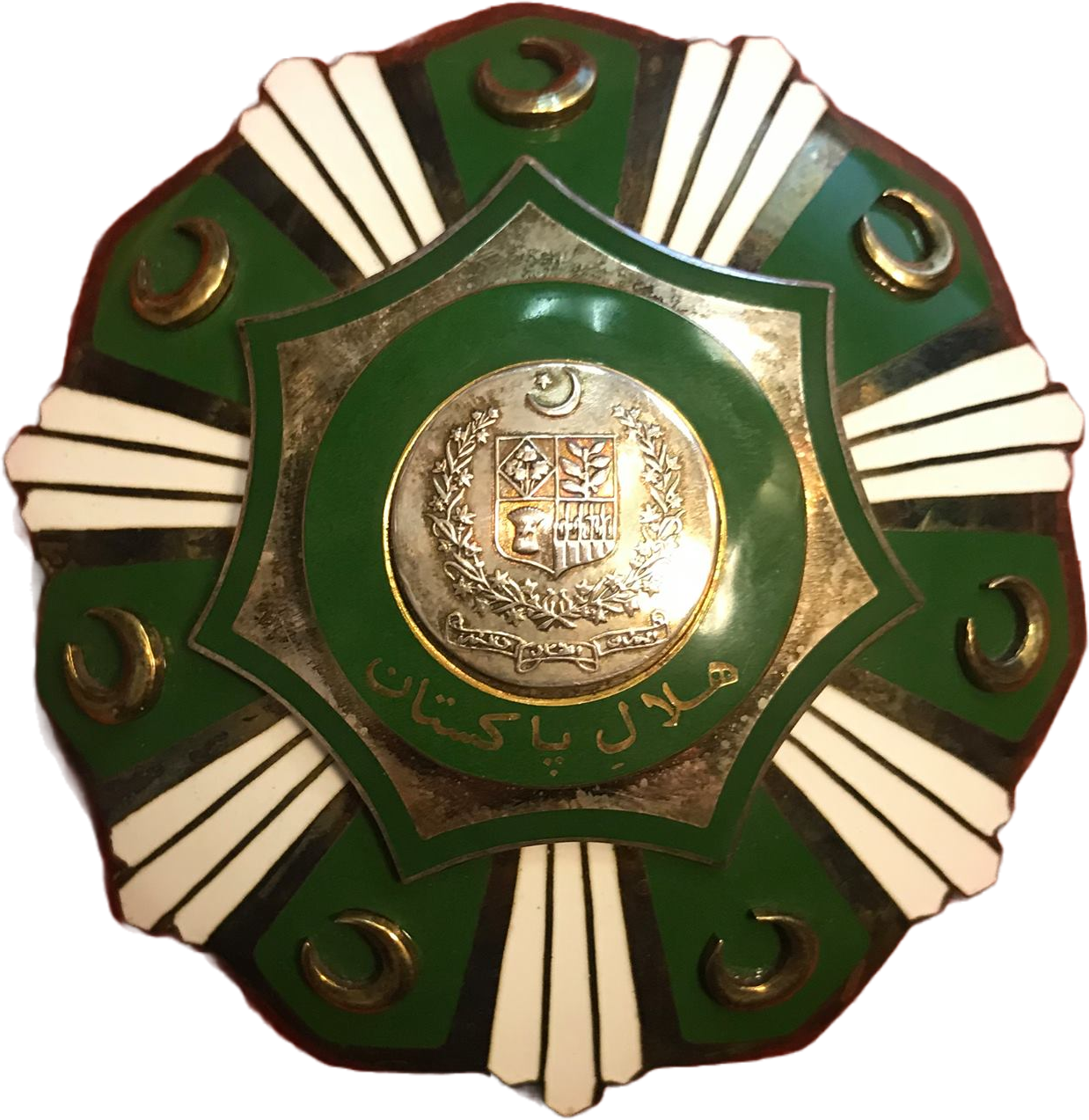
- Neck Medal for Hilal-e-Pakistan Breast Star for the Hilal-e-Pakistan
- Type: National Civilian
- Country: Islamic Republic of Pakistan
- Presented by: Government of Pakistan
- Post-nominals: H.Pk
- Established: March 19, 1957
- First award: 1957
- Final award: 2022

Precedence
- Next (higher): Nishan-e-Pakistan

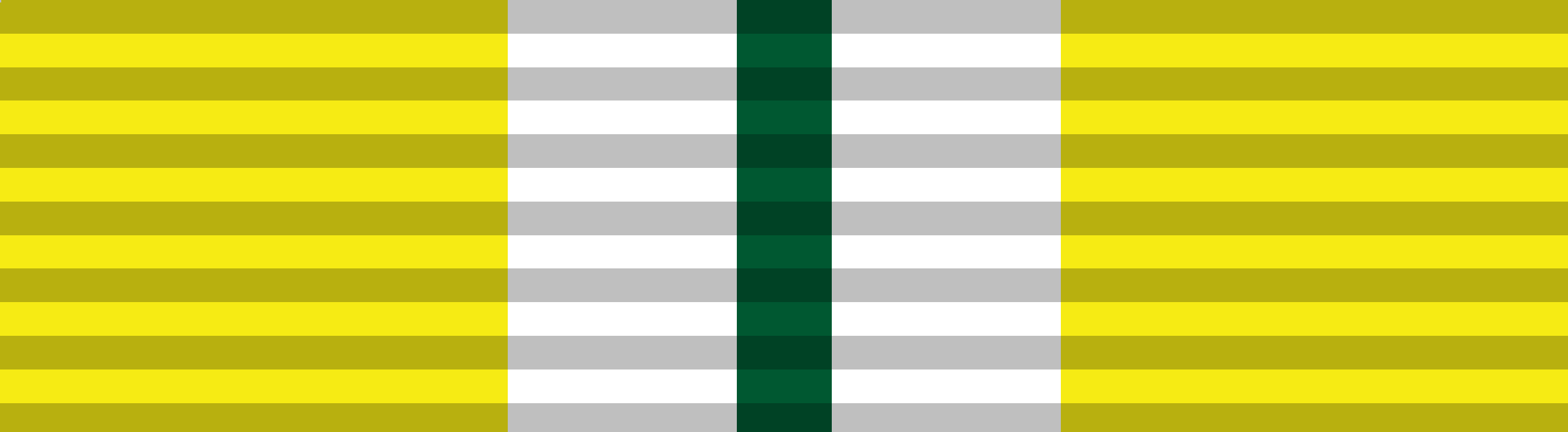
- Equivalent: Hilal-e-Imtiaz (Military) Hilal-e-Imtiaz (Civilian)

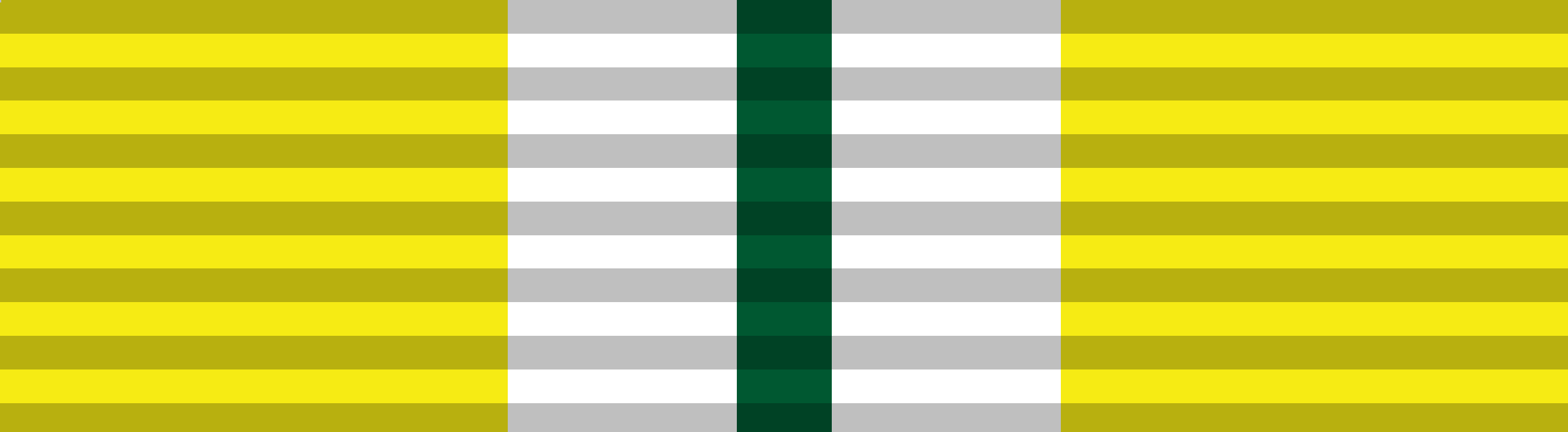
- Next (lower): Sitara-e-Imtiaz (Military) Sitara-e-Imtiaz (Civilian)

Hilal-e-Pakistan award recipients
Year	Number of recipients
19xx	2
1957–1995	6
2005–2008	4
2010–2019	10
2020–2029	3

Hilal-e-Pakistan (Urdu: ہلالِ پاکستان, lit. 'Crescent of Pakistan') is the second-highest civil award (in the hierarchy of "Hilale") of the Islamic Republic of Pakistan. The award seeks to recognise those people who have made "meritorious contribution to the national interests of Pakistan, or cultural, social contribution, or other significant public or private endeavors". The award is not limited to Pakistani citizens. While it is a civilian award, it can also be conferred upon foreign nationals. It is bestowed by the president of Pakistan once a year on the eve of Independence day.

== History ==
Hilal-e-Pakistan and other civil awards came into existence following the declaration of the Islamic Republic of Pakistan on 23 March 1956. However, civil awards including Hilal-e-Pakistan were established on March 19, 1957, under the article 259(2) of the Constitution of Pakistan and Decorations Act, 1975. Hilal-e-Pakistan, the second-highest civil award was possibly first conferred upon Chief justice of Dhaka high court, Amin Ahmed.

== Policy ==
President of Pakistan confers civil awards under the Article 259(2) of the constitution-1973 and decorations Article-1975 in recognition of meritorious contribution and selfless devotion.

== Previous versions of the Hilal-e-Pakistan (State of Pakistan) ==
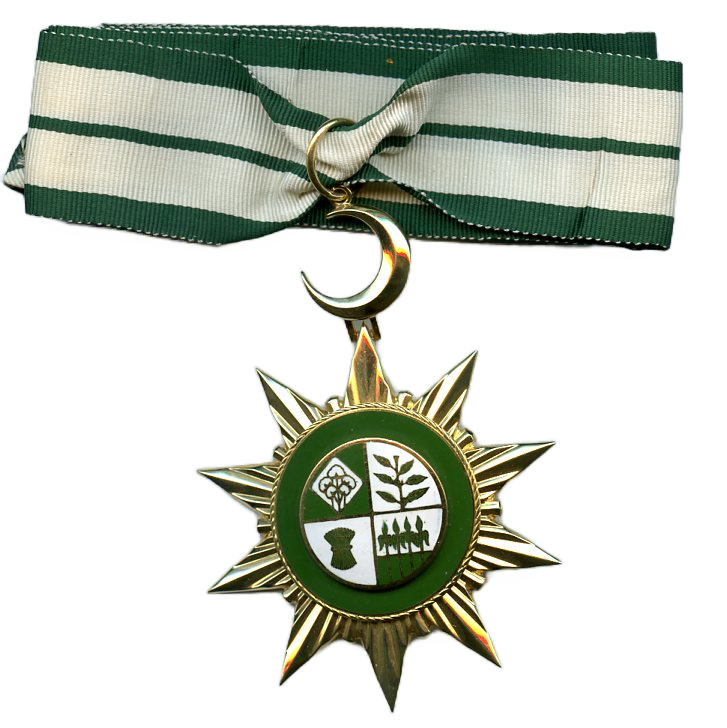
Neck Medal for the 1957-75 version of Hilal-e-Pakistan

== Notable recipients ==
Year	Image	Awardees	State / Country	Note
—N/a		Ayub Khan	Pakistan	Awarded by Zulfikar Ali Bhutto in recognition of playing a key role as a spokesperson at UN.
—N/a		Akhtar Hameed Khan	Pakistan	Awarded in recognition of his role in academic and social development
1957		Amin Ahmed	Pakistan	Awarded by Iskander Mirza in recognition of meritorious services
1958		Abdul Wahid Adamjee	Pakistan	Awarded by Iskander Mirza in recognition of playing significant role in Pakistan's economic and industrial development
1967		Alvin Robert Cornelius	Pakistan	Awarded by Ayub Khan in recognition of meritorious contribution to Pakistan's national interest
1983		Ronald I. Spiers	United States	Awarded by Muhammad Zia-ul-Haq in recognition of promoting friendly relations between Pakistan and United States
1989		Ruth Pfau	Pakistan	Awarded by Ghulam Ishaq Khan in recognition of playing a significant role in controlling/removing leprosy outbreaks in Pakistan
1995		Gerald Kaufman	United Kingdom	Awarded by Farooq Leghari on the recommendations of Benazir Bhutto in recognition of contributing to Pakistan's diplomatic relations.
2005		Nahyan bin Mubarak Al Nahyan	United Arab Emirates	Awarded by Pervez Mushrraf in recognition of promoting economic relations between Pakistan and UAE.
2005		Saif al-Islam Gaddafi	Libya	Awarded by Shaukat Aziz in recognition of promoting economic relations between Pakistan and Libya.
2006		Al-Waleed bin Talal	Saudi Arabia	Awarded by Pervez Musharraf in recognition of his deep friendship and all-round support to Pakistan and his commitment to the causes of the Muslim Ummah.
2006		Ryan Crocker	United States	Awarded by Pervez Musharraf in recognition of supporting Pakistan during 2005 earthquake
2007		Fahd bin Sultan	Saudi Arabia	Awarded by Pervez Musharraf in recognition of his endeavours for strengthening friendship and cooperation between Pakistan and Saudi Arabia.
2008		Hamdan bin Zayed bin Sultan Al Nahyan	United Arab Emirates	Awarded by Pervez Musharraf in recognition of rendering services to Pakistan.
2008		Joe Biden	United States	Awarded by Asif Ali Zardari in recognition of improving economy of Pakistan.
2010		Ahmad Faraz	Pakistan	Posthumously awarded by Asif Ali Zardari in recognition of his contribution to poetry and literature.
2011		Ronald Noble	United States	Awarded by Asif Ali Zardari in recognition of supporting Pakistan to the world police body
2011		Dai Bingguo	China	Awarded by Asif Ali Zardari in recognition of his meritorious services to Pakistan-China friendship and strategic cooperative partnership.
2012		Yang Jiechi	China	Awarded by Asif Ali Zardari in recognition of enhancing foreign relations between Pakistan and China
2012		Sirindhorn	Thailand	Awarded by Asif Ali Zardari
2014		Irina Bokova	Bulgaria	Awarded in recognition of promoting cultural heritage of Pakistan and "helping during natural disasters".
2015		Mehriban Aliyeva	Azerbaijan	Awarded in recognition of initiatives to establish a new modern school in Pakistan after the 2005 Kashmir earthquake
2015		Wang Yi	China	Awarded in recognition of improving relations between Pakistan and China
2019		Mansour bin Zayed Al Nahyan	United Arab Emirates	Awarded by Arif Alvi in recognition of "supporting Pakistan in humanitarian and development fields"
2019		Xu Shaoshi	China	Award was presented by Pakistan's ambassador to China, Naghmana Alamgir Hashmi, in recognition of promoting Belt and Road flagship project.
2019		İsmail Kahraman	Turkey	Awarded by Arif Alvi in recognition of playing significant role in enhancing relations between Pakistan and Turkey
2020		Mevlüt Çavuşoğlu	Turkey	Awarded by Arif Alvi
2020		Song Tao	China	Conferred by Pakistan's ambassador to China, Moin ul Haque, on behalf of President Arif Alvi, in recognition of his outstanding services towards Pakistan and strengthening Pakistan-China relations.
2020		Zhong Shan	China	Conferred by Pakistan's ambassador to China, Moin ul Haque, on behalf of the President of Pakistan, in recognition of his outstanding services towards Pakistan and strengthening Pakistan-China relations, including his role in advancing the second phase of the Pakistan-China free trade agreement.
2021		Volkan Bozkır	Turkey	Awarded by Arif Alvi to Volkan Bozkır as the President of the United Nations General Assembly for his outstanding services to international peace, security and sustainable development.
2022		Bill Gates	United States	On a day long and first-ever visit to Islamabad, Pakistan, Gates was awarded by Arif Alvi for his contribution to eradicating infectious disease polio in Pakistan.
2022		Li Xiaopeng	China	Conferred by Pakistan's ambassador to China, Moin ul Haque, on behalf of President Arif Alvi, in recognition of strengthening Pakistan-China friendship and his role in the completion of important road connectivity projects in Pakistan under CPEC.
2022		Sheila Jackson Lee	United States	Awarded by Arif Alvi in recognition of her outstanding services to Pakistan, including support for flood relief, broader Pakistan-US ties, and the Congressional Pakistan Caucus.
2022		Mohammad bin Abdulkarim Al-Issa	Saudi Arabia	Awarded by Arif Alvi in recognition of his services to Pakistan in strengthening Pakistan-Saudi Arabia relations, scholarships for Pakistani students, safeguarding the rights of Pakistani expatriates, and promoting peace and harmony.
2023		He Lifeng	China	Awarded by Arif Alvi in recognition of his contribution to Pakistan-China friendship and the promotion of CPEC.
2023		Faisal bin Salman	Saudi Arabia	Conferred by Pakistan's ambassador to Saudi Arabia, Ahmad Farooq, in recognition of his outstanding services for Pakistan, including his support for education and welfare initiatives and facilitation for Pakistani workers in the Kingdom.

== Controversies ==
President Asif Ali Zardari was accused in 2011 for conferring 185 civil awards including the Hilal-e-Pakistan, to its federal Cabinet ministers and foreigners. Pakistan news media in 2011, covered reports stating that its former prime minister Zulfiqar Ali Bhutto including Benazir Bhutto were restricted during their tenure from bestowing the civil awards to associates.

== See also ==
- Civil decorations of Pakistan
- Awards and decorations of the Pakistan Armed Forces
