= Suicide in Bangladesh =

A map of global suicide rates, age-standardized per 100,000 population, 2021.: >30; 20–30; 15–20; 10–15; 5–10; 0–5; Data unavailable

Suicide in Bangladesh is a significant public health concern; on average, 40 people die by suicide every day in Bangladesh. According to the World Health Organization's 2024 estimate, the suicide mortality rate in Bangladesh was estimated to be 2.8 per 100,000 people in 2021, although national records and police figures suggest the average number of cases may be higher.

Poverty, family conflict, academic pressure, and gender inequality are risk factors for suicide in Bangladesh. Some research has also highlighted higher vulnerability among young people and students, particularly during the COVID-19 pandemic.

== Statistics ==
In 2021, the World Health Organization reported 4,714 suicide cases in Bangladesh, but International Centre for Diarrhoeal Disease Research noted that police records show 15,050 cases.

=== Suicide by students ===
A survey conducted by the Aachol Foundation in 2026 revealed that, in 2025, at least 403 students died by suicide, an increase from 310 in 2024. The numbers were 532 in 2022 and 513 in 2023. Out of the total cases, 190 involved schoolchildren up to 10th grade, which accounts for approximately 47.4%. Approximately 28 percent of the suicides were linked to depression, while 23 percent were attributed to feelings of resentment or emotional turmoil. Other reported causes included 13% for love affairs, 8% for family conflict, 6% for mental instability, and over 3% for sexual violence.

Among female students, 55 percent died by suicide due to depression, and 32 percent due to emotional distress. In contrast, 45 percent of male students took their lives because of depression, while 38 percent cited emotional distress as a reason.

According to another survey conducted by the same organization in 2025, among students, the Dhaka division had the highest suicide rate, at 29 percent. This was followed by Khulna division with a rate of 17.7 percent and Chattogram division at 15.8 percent. Both the Rajshahi division and the Barisal division reported rates of 10.7 percent. Rangpur division had a rate of 7.7 percent, Mymensingh division had 5.5 percent, and Sylhet division had the lowest rate at 2.9 percent.

==== Post-COVID-19 ====
Research after the COVID-19 pandemic period has examined patterns of student suicides in Bangladesh after educational institutions resumed in-person activities. A retrospective analysis of reports from more than 150 Bangladeshi online news portals identified 984 student suicide cases between 2022 and 2023, including 532 cases in 2022 and 452 in 2023. Female students accounted for 61% of reported cases, while 39% involved male students.

The majority of victims were between 13 and 19 years old (72.5%), and secondary-level students represented the largest educational group affected. Higher secondary students accounted for 19.1% of cases, while 7.2% involved students from Madrasahs. The study also reported that 79.9% of cases involved hanging, with poison ingestion accounting for 13.9%.

Several contributing factors were identified in the reported cases. The most frequently cited was emotional distress (28%), followed by romantic relationship issues (19.5%), academic pressure or failure (8.4%), and family problems (8.1%).[4] Other reported factors included mental instability such as depression or anxiety (7%), sexual harassment (3.3%), and financial crisis (1.1%), while some cases had no identified cause.

The study noted that the COVID-19 pandemic had previously been associated with increased psychological stress among students due to school closures and disruptions to education, and suggested that the post-pandemic period continued to reflect significant mental-health challenges for young people in Bangladesh.

The researchers also highlighted structural limitations in suicide monitoring in Bangladesh, noting the absence of a national suicide surveillance system or centralized database. Because of this gap, many studies rely on media reports to estimate patterns of suicide in the country. Researchers suggested that expanded mental-health awareness in educational institutions and the development of a nationwide suicide surveillance system could help address the issue.

=== Suicide by gender ===
The rate of suicide is higher among men, with 3.6 per 100,000 individuals, compared to 2 per 100,000 individuals for women. However, the percentage of suicide attempts is greater among women, standing at 4.17%, while for men, it is 3.36%.

Economic hardship has been identified as a major contributing factor. Some studies estimate that poverty is associated with between 55% and 81% of suicide and suicide attempt cases in Bangladesh, affecting both men and women.

Studies suggest that social and economic expectations may contribute to suicide among men in Bangladesh. In particular, pressure to fulfill culturally expected roles as financial providers within families has been linked to psychological distress and family conflict when these expectations are not met. Marital expectation and relationship pressures including difficulties fulfilling socially prescribed roles within a marriage, may also contribute to emotional distress among men.

Research has also highlighted gendered social pressures affecting women in Bangladesh. Suicide has been reported to occur more frequently among young married women, individuals from lower socio-economic backgrounds, and people living in rural areas. Scholars have linked suicidal behavior among women to factors such as gender inequality, lower educational attainment, early or forced marriage, domestic conflict, infertility, pressure related to childbearing, conflicts with in-laws, pregnancy resulting from rape, and other forms of abuse of social oppression.

== Geographic disparities ==
Suicide patterns in Bangladesh vary across geographic regions, with studies indicating higher risks in rural areas compared to urban settings. A population-based survey conducted in seven sub-districts, covering approximately 1.16 million people, estimated the rate of fatal suicidal behavior at 3.29 per 10,000 person-years observed (PYO) and non-fatal suicidal behavior at 9.68 per 100,000 PYO.

Research suggests that rural-urban differences in suicide rates may be influenced by factors such as limited access to healthcare services, socioeconomic conditions, and differences in social support systems. In rural areas, commonly reported methods include hanging and poisoning, with pesticide ingestion frequently noted due to its availability in agricultural settings.

The study also notes that findings from rural populations may not be fully generalizable to urban areas due to differences in demographic and socioeconomic conditions.

== Methods ==
Hanging is the most common method of suicide in Bangladesh. There is no cost involvement in this method other than ligature material, i.e., a rope, and thus, that is why it is the preferred method. Swallowing poison is another common method in Bangladesh to die by suicide. In urban areas, people follow other methods to die by suicide, such as by an overdose of barbiturate tablets, or by other means. Other common methods include self-immolation, throwing oneself in front of a train, and jumping from a rooftop.

Another research published in the Central Medical College Journal identifies that, in general, men tend to choose more violent methods like hanging or shooting. Common methods of suicide among women in Bangladesh include hanging, poisoning, and drowning.

== Notable incidents ==
=== 2007 Mymensingh mass suicide ===
In 2007, in Mymensingh, a family of nine died by mass suicide by hurling themselves onto a train. According to the diaries recovered from their home, they wanted a pure life as lived by Adam and Eve, freeing themselves from bondage to any religion.

=== Suicide of Salman Shah ===
In 1996, Bangladeshi film actor Salman Shah died by suicide by hanging. The Police Bureau of Investigation (PBI) cited multiple contributing factors, including a romantic relationship, marital distress, prior suicide attempts, and family conflict. Although his family alleged that the death was a murder, the PBI concluded that it was a suicide following a 24-year investigation.

=== Suicide of Mita Noor ===
On 1 July 2013, Bangladeshi television actress Mita Noor died by suicide at her residence in Dhaka. Police reported she was found hanging, and media reports indicated that personal and marital issues were considered possible contributing factors to her death.

=== Suicide of Raudha Athif ===
On 29 March 2017, Maldivian model and medical student Raudha Athif, who gained international recognition after being featured in Vogue India, died by suicide after being found hanging in her dormitory at Islami Bank Medical College in Rajshahi, Bangladesh. The Police Bureau of Investigation (PBI) concluded her death was a suicide, although her father disputed this finding and alleged that she had been murdered.

== Law ==
According to Chapter XVI, Section 309 of the Bangladesh Penal Code,

Whoever attempts to commit suicide and does any act towards the commission of such offence, shall be punished with simple imprisonment for a term which may extend to one year, or with fine, or with both.

But in most cases, no legal action is taken against individuals who attempt suicide, considering social and humane factors.

Suicide and attempted suicide remain criminal offenses under Bangladesh Penal Code. However, the issue of decriminalizing suicide has been debated among researchers and policymakers. Some scholars argue that criminalization may discourage individuals from seeking medical or psychological help after suicide attempts, while others suggest broader reform should be implemented before legal changes are introduced, such as improved suicide surveillance systems and prevention strategies.

The Mental Health Act of 2018 replaced the colonial-era Lunacy Act of 1912 and established a legal framework for the treatment and protection of people with mental illness in Bangladesh. The law provides provisions for the assessment, admission, treatment, and guardianship of individuals with mental disorders, as well as the establishment and regulations of mental health hospitals and rehabilitation centers. It also introduced mechanisms such as Mental Health Review and Monitoring Committees at the district level to oversee the admission and treatment of psychiatric patients.

However, the Mental Health Act of 2018 did not include provisions addressing the decriminalization of suicide attempts. Bangladesh is one of the few South Asian countries where suicide attempts remain criminalized. Several neighboring countries, including India, Nepal, Afghanistan, the Maldives, and Sri Lanka, have decriminalized suicide attempts.

== Prevention ==
Bangladesh currently lacks a comprehensive national suicide prevention strategy or a centralized suicide surveillance system. Studies have noted that existing suicide prevention initiatives in the country remain limited and fragmented. One of the few public-sector services is the Suicide Prevention Clinic, established in 2016 at Bangladesh Medical University, which provides psychotherapy services for individuals experiencing suicidal behavior.

Several non-governmental organizations also conduct suicide prevention activities, such as Kaan Pete Roi, founded in 2013. It is a telephone-based emotional support and suicide prevention helpline modeled after international crisis support networks. Other initiatives have included community-based programs like Society for Voluntary Activities in Jhenaidah district, which focused on addressing underlying social factors associated with suicide. The Brighter Tomorrow Foundation, established in 2015, has organized awareness campaigns and public engagement activities related to suicide prevention and mental health.

The Society for Suicide Prevention Bangladesh, formed in 2016, aims to promote suicide prevention initiatives and collaboration among professionals working in the field. Researchers have noted that many of these initiatives operate on a limited scale and face challenges related to funding, public awareness, and accessibility.

Vent by Mindspace is another Psychological Crisis Hotline Service, launched on 25 October 2021, has been providing psychological first-aid to more than three hundred people in only three months of its operation.

=== Prevention recommendations ===
Research on suicide in Bangladesh has emphasized the importance of expanding mental health support within educational institutions. Suggested measures include increasing mental health awareness programs, integrating mental health education into school curricula, and providing trained counselors and psychological support services for students. Researchers have also highlighted the importance of gender-sensitive interventions, improved reporting systems, and policies aimed at addressing factors such as sexual harassment and academic stress that may contribute to student distress.

Additional recommendations include training teachers and guardians to recognize signs of psychological distress and respond to mental health crises, as well as expanding access to mental health services. Researchers have also suggested developing a national suicide surveillance system to improve monitoring of suicide trends and support evidence-based prevention strategies.

Some studies have further proposed strengthening the country's mental healthcare infrastructure by establishing mental health units in medical college hospitals and district-level government hospitals, in line with the provisions of the Mental Health Act of 2018. Researchers have also emphasized the need for additional mental health policies and supporting legislation to improve patient rights protections, expand service capacity, and promote greater public awareness of mental health and social support systems in Bangladesh.

== See also ==
- List of suicide crisis lines
- List of countries by suicide rate
