= Rangpur Medical College =

Government medical college in Rangpur, Bangladesh

- রংপুর মেডিকেল কলেজ
- Emblem of Rangpur Medical College
- Other name: RpMC
- Type: Public medical school
- Established: 18 March 1970; 56 years ago
- Academic affiliations: Rajshahi Medical University
- Principal: Md. Anwar Hossain
- Students: 1400
- Location: Dhap, Rangpur, Bangladesh; 25.7667°N 89.2342°E
- Campus: Urban
- Language: English
- Website: rpmc.edu.bd

Rangpur Medical College (RpMC) (Bengali: রংপুর মেডিকেল কলেজ) is a government medical school in Bangladesh, established in 1970. It is located in the northern city of Rangpur. It is affiliated with Rajshahi Medical University.

It offers a five-year medical education course leading to an MBBS degree. A one-year internship after graduation is compulsory for all graduates. The degree is recognized by the Bangladesh Medical and Dental Council.

The college is associated with the 1,000-bed Rangpur Medical College Hospital (RpMCH). Journal of Rangpur Medical College is the official journal of the college.

== History ==
Rangpur Medical College was established on 18th March 1970. The first batch of 50 students was admitted in 1971.

In 2018, the Anti-Corruption Commission charged college principal Md Nur Islam and five others with embezzling 45 million taka ($530,000 in 2019) by buying unnecessary and poor quality medical equipment.

== Campus ==
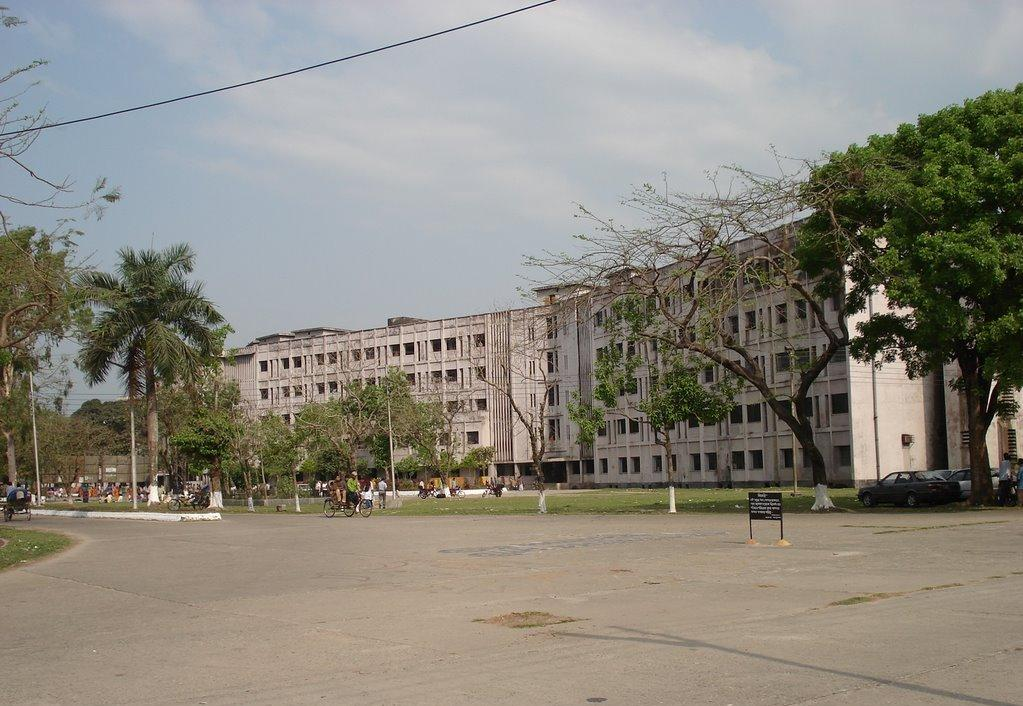
Rangpur Medical College Hospital main building

The college is located in the northwestern part of Rangpur, on the east side of the Rangpur–India–Nepal highway. It is adjacent to the five storied, 1,000-bed Rangpur Medical College Hospital.

== Organization and administration ==
The college has been affiliated with Rajshahi Medical University since 2017. Before that it was affiliated with the University of Rajshahi. The principal of the college is Prof. Dr. Md. Anwar Hossain.

== Academics ==
The college offers a five-year course of study, approved by the Bangladesh Medical and Dental Council (BMDC), leading to a Bachelor of Medicine, Bachelor of Surgery (MBBS) degree from Rajshahi Medical University. After passing the final professional examination, there is a compulsory one-year internship. The internship is a prerequisite for obtaining registration from the BMDC to practice medicine.

Admission for Bangladeshis to the MBBS course at all medical colleges in Bangladesh is controlled centrally by the Directorate General of Health Services (DGHS). It administers an annual, written, multiple choice question admission exam simultaneously across the country. It sets prerequisites for who can take the exam, and sets a minimum pass level. DGHS has varied the admission rules over the years, but historically candidates have been admitted based primarily on their score on this test. Grades at the Secondary School Certificate (SSC) and Higher Secondary School Certificate (HSC) level have also been a factor, as part of a combined score or as a prerequisite for taking the exam. DGHS also admits candidates to fill quotas: freedom fighters' descendants, tribal, foreign, and others. Admission for foreign students is based on their SSC and HSC grades. As of 2026, the college is allowed to admit 225 students annually.

The medical college also offers a Bachelor of Dental Surgery (BDS) course, which admits 50 students annually.

Since 2014, the college has also offered five-year postgraduate residency courses (M.D. and M.S.) under Bangladesh Medical University (BMU).

Journal of Rangpur Medical College (JRMC) is the official journal of the college. It is a peer-reviewed, open access journal, published semi-annually in March and September. It accepts original research articles, review articles, case reports, and short communications.

== Facilities ==
Rangpur Medical College is equipped with a range of modern facilities. The campus includes a newly modernized auditorium; three male and three female student hostels; a 10-storey postgraduate student hostel; and separate hostels for male and female interns, covering an area of approximately 7,600 square meters.

The campus also houses a Nursing Institute, an Institute of Nuclear Medicine and Allied Sciences, a morgue, staff quarters, a mosque, Shaheed Minar, and a spacious playground. In addition, Rangpur Medical College has a modern library well stocked with medical textbooks from various medical disciplines.

== Notable alumni ==
- Ejajul Islam, physician and actor
- Hamidul Haque Khandker, orthopedic surgeon, former member of parliament
- Eunus Ali Sarkar, member of parliament
- Imran H Sarkar, political activist
