= Soumendra Sarker =

Judge of the High Court Division of Bangladesh Supreme Court

Justice of the High Court Division of Bangladesh

Personal details
- Profession: Judge

Soumendra Sarker is a judge of the High Court Division of Bangladesh Supreme Court.

== Early life ==
Sarker was born on 31 October 1953.

== Career ==
Sarker joined the judicial branch of the Bangladesh Civil Service as a Munsef on 6 November 1978. On 20 November 1995, he was promoted to District and Sessions Judge.

On 30 June 2010, Sarker was appointed as an additional judge of the High Court Division.

In June 2010, Sarker and Justice Tariq ul Hakim ordered the government to not torture Mahmudur Rahman, editor of Amar Desh, in custody. In June 2011, Sarker was made a permanent judge of the High Court Division along with eight other judges. The eight judges were Abu Bakar Siddiquee, M Enayetur Rahim, Md. Moinul Islam Chowdhury, M. Moazzam Husain, Md. Nuruzzaman, Md. Rezaul Hasan, Naima Haider, and Obaidul Hassan.

Sarker is the President of the managing committee of the Ramakrishna Mission Dhaka.

On 30 October 2020, Sarker retired from the High Court Division.
