= Crime in Bangladesh =

- Homicide: 1.8 (2023)
- Assault: 0.4 (2006)
- Burglary: 2.3 (2006)
- Theft: 8.9 (2006)
- Rape: 8.0 (2006)
- reported per 100,000 inhabitants

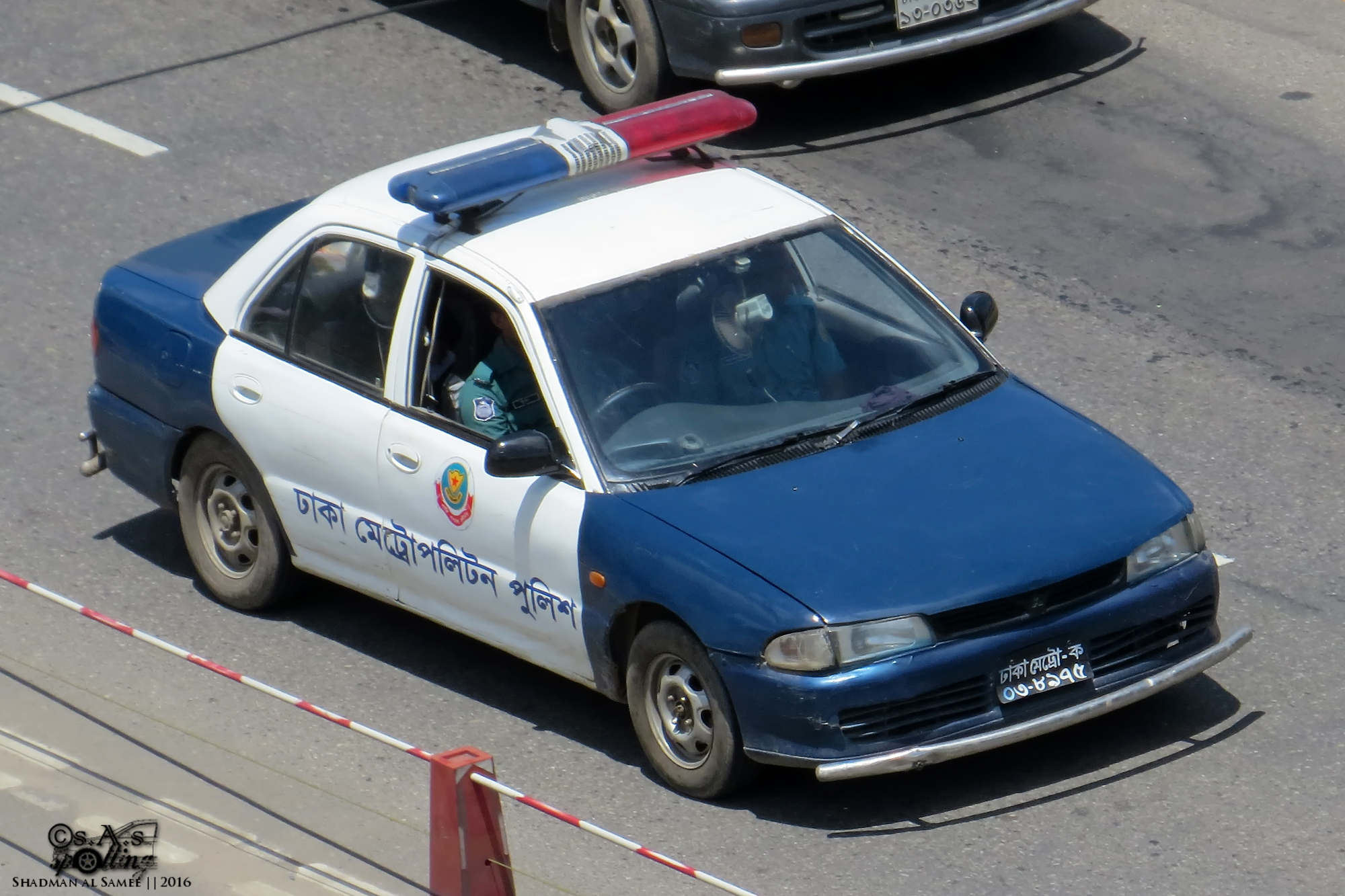
A Dhaka Metropolitan Police car.

Crime in Bangladesh is present in various forms such as black marketeering, contract killing, corruption, drug trafficking, extortion, fraud, human trafficking, kidnapping, money laundering, murder, political violence, rape, robbery, terrorism, wildlife trafficking, etc.

== Narcotics trafficking ==
Bangladesh is used as a transit route for narcotics produced in neighboring countries. The Annual Report for 2007 from the International Narcotics Control Board (INCB), reports that Bangladesh is now the main transit point for the movement and trafficking of heroin from Southeast Asia into the European market . The report noted that the porous borders between Bangladesh and India contribute to the cross-border trafficking of narcotics.

The known means of trafficking drugs into Bangladesh are couriers from Pakistan, commercial vehicles and trains from India or Burma in addition to shipments from India via the Bay of Bengal.

It is estimated that 100,000 people are involved in narcotics trafficking in Bangladesh.

== Homicides ==
A total of 10,331 homicides were reported to Bangladesh authorities from 2001 to 2003, showing a significant increase in recent years.

== Software piracy ==
For the Asia Pacific region, Bangladesh is ranked as one of the main countries for Software Piracy. In 2008, it was estimated that the Software Industry loses nearly $102 million (USD) every year as a result.

== See also ==
- 2018–2019 Bangladesh drug war
- Prostitution in Bangladesh
