= 2001 Bangladesh post-election violence =

The 2001 Bangladesh post-election violence was a series of violent incidents following the 2001 Bangladeshi general election. The religious minority, the Hindus, were victims of targeted violence by supporters of the Bangladesh Nationalist Party.

== Background ==
In the 2001 Bangladeshi general election, the ruling Awami League led by Sheikh Hasina was defeated by the opposition party, the Bangladesh Nationalist Party led by Khaleda Zia. Violence broke out between Awami League supporters and supporters of the Bangladesh Nationalist Party, with the support of the Bangladesh Police.

== Incident ==
The violence mostly occurred in South West Bangladesh which had large Hindu communities. The attacks started after the election victory of Bangladesh Nationalist Party. The attacks were systematic with a motive to destroy the economic resources of the Hindu community, terrorise them into fleeing to India, and grabbing their properties. Hindus were targeted in Bagerhat District, Barisal District, Bhola District, Bogra District, Brahmanbaria District, Chittagong District, Feni District, Gazipur District, Jhenaidah District, Jessore District, Khulna District, Kushtia District, Munshiganj District, Natore District, Narayanganj District, Narsingdi District, Pirojpur District, Sirajganj District, Satkhira District, and Tangail District.

In October 2001, in Lalmohan Upazila, Bhola District, Bangladesh Nationalist Party supporters attacked Hindus and Bangladesh Awami League supporters. They looted the houses of Hindus and the houses of Muslims who provided shelter to Hindus. The attackers raped women and children. The attackers looted everything from the houses and cut down trees on the victim's properties.

The Daily Star (Bangladesh) wrote on 16 November 2001 about 600 Hindu women were gang raped by members of Bangladesh Nationalist Party in Char Fasson Upazila, Bhola District. The youngest was 8 year old and the oldest was 70 year old. In Tuniaghara, Manirampur Upazila, Jessore District six Hindu families were forced to leave the area and two women were raped.

== Reactions and legacy ==
Newspaper analysis blamed the violence on inadequate law enforcement activities. They also blamed the unpreparedness of the local government and administration to tackle violence.

In 2009, the Bangladesh High Court ordered a judicial investigation into the post-election violence. In 2011, the judicial commission submitted the findings of its investigation. The report found evidence of targeted violence against the Hindu community by 25 thousand people, which included 25 Ministers and Members of Parliament of the Bangladesh Nationalist Party-Jamaat-e-Islami led alliance government. The report was rejected by the Bangladesh Nationalist Party, which accused the investigation of being partisan.

The commission reported that the number of rapes committed exceeded 18 thousand. The report also notes incidents of violence, arson, looting, and torture against the minority Hindu community of Bangladesh. In 2011, a court in Sirajganj District sentenced 11 individuals to life time imprisonment for the Rape of Purnima Rani Shil in the 2001 post election violence.
