= Md. Shohrowardi =

Bangladeshi judge

- মো. সোহরাওয়ার্দী

Justice of the High Court Division of Bangladesh
- Incumbent
- Assumed office 12 February 2015

Personal details
- Born: November 5, 1970 (age 55)
- Education: University of Dhaka
- Profession: Judge

Md. Shohrowardi is a justice of the High Court Division of Bangladesh Supreme Court.

== Early life ==
Shohrowardi was born on 5 December 1970. He completed his bachelor's degree and master's in law from the University of Dhaka.

== Career ==
Shohrowardi became a lawyer of the district courts on 16 October 1994.

On 29 September 1996, Shohrowardi became a lawyer of the High Court Division of Bangladesh Supreme Court.

Shohrowardi became a lawyer of the Appellate Division of the Supreme Court of Bangladesh on 23 October 2014.

Shohrowardi was appointed an additional judge of the High Court Division of Bangladesh Supreme Court on 12 February 2015. On 15 September, Shohrowardi was made a judge of the International Crimes Tribunal-1.

Shohrowardi was made a permanent judge of the High Court Division of Bangladesh Supreme Court on 8 February 2017. On 20 April, Shohrowardi, as part of a bench with Justice Anwarul Haque and Justice Md Shahinur Islam, sentenced Syed Mohammad Hussain and Muhammad Moslem Pradhan to death for taking part in war crimes during Bangladesh Liberation war. In July 2017, he was sent back from the International Crimes Tribunal to the High Court Division as per his wish.

In November 2018, Shohrowardi and Justice Tariq ul Hakim, issued an order asking the Bangladesh Election Commission to register Trinamool BNP formed by Nazmul Huda. In December 2018, Shohrowardi and Justice Tariq ul Hakim, issued an order asking the Bangladesh Election Commission to accept the candidacy of Afzal H Khan for Mymensingh-1 in the 11th parliamentary elections scheduled to be held on 31 December 2018.
