= Chittagong District Bar Association =

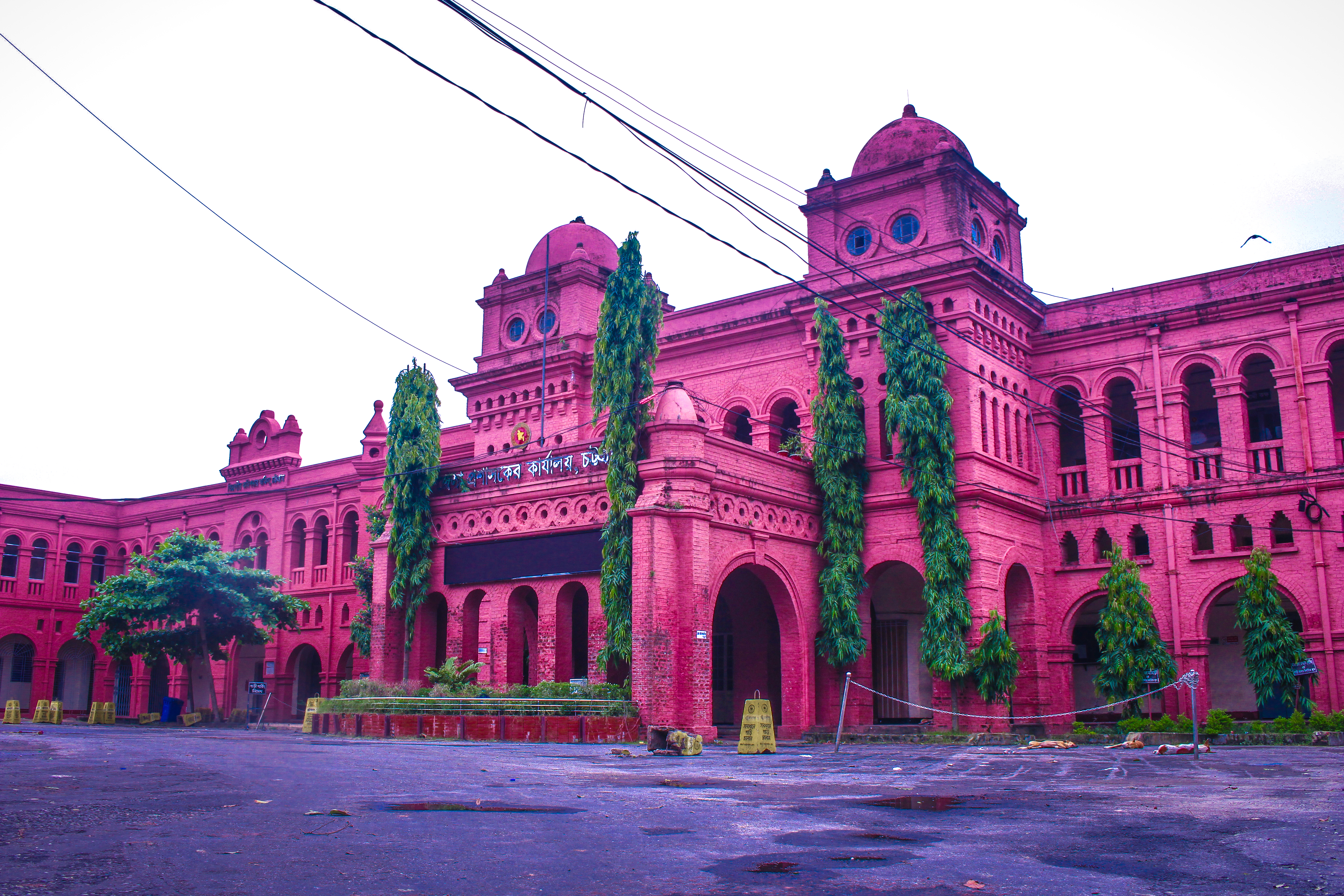
- Formation: 1893
- Headquarters: Dhaka, Bangladesh
- Region served: Bangladesh
- Official language: Bengali
- Website: cdba.com.bd

Chittagong District Bar Association is bar association for Chittagong District in Bangladesh.

== History ==
On 23 March 1893, 17 lawyers established the Chittagong District Bar Association. It is housed inside the historic Chittagong Court Building.

The Chittagong District Bar Association decided to close the Chittagong District Court on hartal (strike) days in 1989, making it the only district court in the country to do so. In 2005, the Ainjibi Samannoy Parishad, backed by Awami League, won the bar election.

In May 2016, the president of the association, Md. Mujibul Haque, wrote to the Ministry of Law requesting additional judges for the Chittagong District Court. The Ainjibi Oikya Parishad, backed by Bangladesh Nationalist Party and Bangladesh Jammat e Islami, won the most seats in the 2016 bar election. Sammilita Ainjibi Shamannay Parishad, backed by the Awami League, received the second-highest number of seats, followed by the Samomana Ainjibi Sangsad, backed by left-wing political parties.

It signed an agreement for receiving membership dues with Sonali Bank Limited. The Awami League supported Sammilita Ainjibi Shamannay Parishad won the 2022 association election led by Abu Mohammad Hashem.

Following the fall of the Sheikh Hasina led Awami League government, the general secretary of the association, Ashraf Hossain Chowdhury, was appointed public prosecutor of the Chittagong District. He got into an argument with a judge he pleaded for the judge to accept a case by Showaibul Islam, who was injured in protests against the former prime minister Sheikh Hasina. The judge had asked the plaintiff to name 126 accused, almost all of whom were unnamed, in the case, which Chowdhury argued was impossible.

After the Murder of Saiful Islam Alif, a member of the association, at the bail hearing of Bangladeshi Hindu monk Chinmoy Krishna Das, the association demanded the arrest of all accused in the murder, including 70 lawyers. The association closed the court, protesting the murder. It established an inquiry committee into the murder. In April 2025, the Bangladesh Nationalist Party and Bangladesh Jamaat-e-Islami-backed lawyers divided up the executive body of the association without holding an election. Pro-Awami league lawyers were not allowed to participate in the election process.
