= Maksum-ul-Hakim =

Bangladeshi Judge

- মুকসুমুল হাকিম
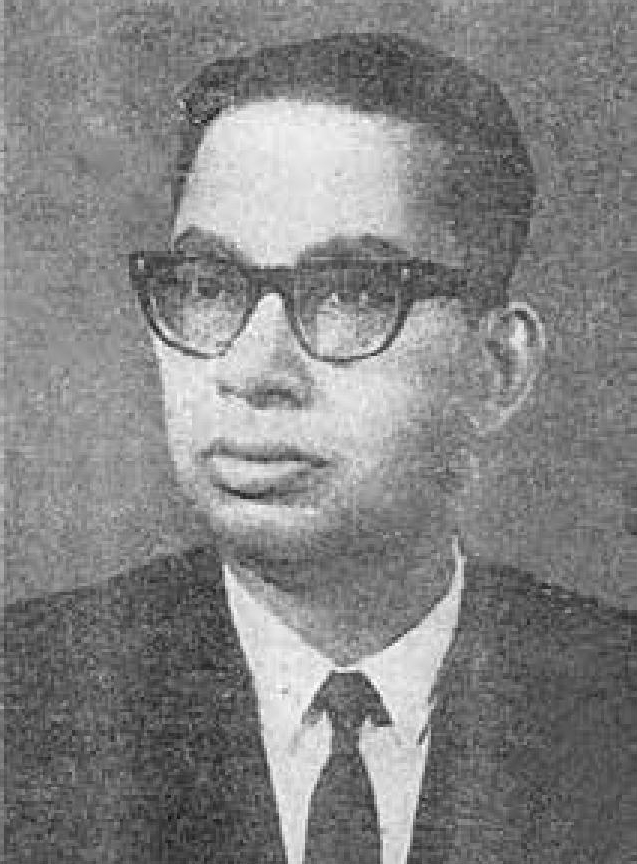

Justice Dhaka High Court

Ambassador of Bangladesh to Argentina

Ambassador of Bangladesh to Sweden
- In office 4 September 1976 – 5 November 1979
- Preceded by: A. Razzak
- Succeeded by: Muhammad Faiz

Personal details
- Born: 1926 Khulna, British India
- Died: 12 October 2005 (aged 78–79) Dhaka, Bangladesh
- Spouse: Nessima Hakim
- Children: three daughters and one son Tariq ul Hakim
- Education: University of Calcutta
- Profession: Judge

Maksum-ul-Hakim was a jurist, diplomat and justice of Dhaka High Court in Bangladesh. He was an Advocate General for the government. He was an elected member of the Geneva-based UN Human Rights Committee for Prevention of Discrimination of Minorities. He was one of the judge of famous Agartala Conspiracy Case.

== Early life ==
Hakim was born in Khulna. His father was a deputy magistrate of the British India government. He did his masters at the University of Calcutta and was called to Lincoln's Inn in London.

== Career ==
Hakim was the Advocate General in 1962 and was appointed justice to the High Court in 1964.

Hakim served as the ambassador of Bangladesh to Argentina. He was also the ambassador of Bangladesh to Sweden.

== Personal life ==
Maksum married Nessima, second daughter of former chief justice of Dhaka High Court Amin Ahmed. They had three daughters (Yasmin, Sonia, and Tania) and one son, Tariq ul Hakim, Dhaka High Court justice.

== Death ==
Maksum died in Dhaka on 12 October 2005.
