= Rape of Purnima Rani Shil =

2001 post-election rape in Bangladesh

The rape of Purnima Rani Shil, then a child, took place during post-election violence against Awami League supporters and religious minorities in 2001.

== Background ==
In 2001, the Bangladesh Nationalist Party and Bangladesh Jamaat-e-Islami led coalition won the general election, replacing the Awami League. This change led to the 2001 Bangladesh post-election violence, during which Awami League supporters and members of religious minorities were targeted by activists of the Bangladesh Nationalist Party and Bangladesh Jamaat-e-Islami. Purnima was targeted as she was a polling agent of the Awami League, and she had also protested ballot stuffing by Bangladesh Nationalist Party activists during the election.

== History ==
Shil was a 12-year-old girl in Perba Delua in Ullahpara Upazila, Sirajganj District, when her home was attacked by 30–40 men on 8 October 2001. She was gang raped. Four people, associated with the Bangladesh Nationalist Party and Bangladesh Jamaat-e-Islami, were arrested but never charged. Her sister lost her eyesight, and her family business, a hair salon, was looted twice. Her family was forced to flee the village. This was part of a systematic attack on Hindu villages to drive them out of Bangladesh by radical Islamists and Bangladesh Jamaat-e-Islami. She was brought to Dhaka at the initiative of Waheedul Haq and Shahriar Kabir, who arranged for her treatment in Dhaka.

The trial started after Awami League returned to power. On 4 May 2011, 11 men were sentenced to life imprisonment for their involvement in the rape of Shil. They were also fined 100 thousand taka each. Six of the convicts are in custody, while 5 remain on the run. Shil was not happy with the verdict, as she believed at least two of the accused, from her village, should have been sentenced to death.

Shil received financial support for her education from Prime Minister Sheikh Hasina, leader of the Awami League. After completing her education, she worked as a music tutor in Dhaka. Before that, she worked briefly at a TV station but had to quit in the face of harassment on Facebook. She had been socially ostracised and faced widespread abuse on social media.

In 2018, Shil became the personal officer of Tarana Halim, state minister of information. On 16 January 2019, she bought nomination papers from Awami League with the aim of becoming a member of parliament from a seat reserved for women. She is a member of Awami League's Agriculture and Cooperative Sub-Committee.

== In popular culture ==
Shil was shown in a video titled "Didi you do not love us", which was a campaign video of the Bharatiya Janata Party during the 2021 West Bengal Legislative Assembly election. The video showed violence against minorities in Bangladesh, Islamic extremists in the Middle East, and cattle smuggling at the Bangladesh-India border.
