= Kaan Pete Roi =

Emotional support helpline in Bangladesh

- Kaan Pete Roi Logo
- Formation: 2013
- Founder: Yeshim Iqbal
- Type: Non-profit
- Purpose: Suicide prevention
- Location: Bangladesh
- Official language: Bengali
- Key people: Yeshim Iqbal, Sawgat Mahmud, Rozy Hossain,
- Volunteers: 80+
- Website: www.kaanpeteroi.org

Kaan Pete Roi is an emotional support helpline in Bangladesh.

Its founders say it is the first of its kind in the country. It is staffed by trained volunteers; people can call to receive immediate emergency counseling. The mission of the helpline is to alleviate feelings of despair, isolation, distress, and suicidal feelings among members of the community, through confidential listening. The helpline is intended for suicide prevention and the promotion of mental health.

== Background ==
The service was founded by Yeshim Iqbal, a graduate of psychology from Cornell University currently a doctoral student at New York University who had previously worked for similar help lines abroad. After coming back to Bangladesh from United States she worked with a team of staff and volunteers. The current staff members include Rozy Hossain, Helpline Coordinator; Sawgat Mahmud, PR & Communications Coordinator; Arun Das, Volunteer Coordinator, and Rubina Jahan Rumi, Outreach Coordinator Kaan Pete Roi opened its phone lines on April 28, 2013.

== Caller confidentiality ==
Kaan Pete Roi does not share any caller details outside the organization. The organization's policy is not to ask the callers for any information relating to their identities and all the volunteers sign a very strict confidentiality agreement. If callers involuntarily disclose traceable personal information, volunteers are strictly asked not to note down anything of that nature. Kaan Pete Roi realizes that it is often easier to seek help knowing that the callers would not be subject to any scrutiny. The volunteers are trained to make it clear that they require no information about the person but are there just to talk. This works not only to protect the caller's identity but helps him or her open up more, knowing that they can hang up anytime and not have to answer questions.

== Volunteer confidentiality ==
Kaan Pete Roi volunteers are asked not to disclose their own names or identities and are discouraged from forging a relationship with their callers. Office addresses are not public and individual volunteer timings are also not given out. Kaan Pete Roi goes a step further by asking their volunteers not to disclose what they do to any public media or forum.
