= UNICEF Bangladesh =

National office of UNICEF in Bangladesh

- Abbreviation: UNICEF Bangladesh
- Formation: 1952
- Type: Country office
- Legal status: Active
- Headquarters: UNICEF House, Plot E-30, Sayed Mahbub Morshed Avenue, Sher-e-Bangla Nagar, Dhaka, Bangladesh
- Head: Rana Flowers (Representative)
- Parent organization: UNICEF International
- Website: unicef.org.bd

The UNICEF Bangladesh is a national office of the United Nations Children's Fund responsible for providing humanitarian and developmental aid to children across Bangladesh. The national office falls under the UNICEF ROSA.

In 1949, UNICEF's journey in Bangladesh began with the establishment of a field office in Bangkok, overseeing (then) East Pakistan. A year later, their first office opened in Dhaka, equipped with just two professionals and a driver. This marked the start of a decades-long commitment to the welfare of women and children in the region.

== UNICEF in Bangladesh ==
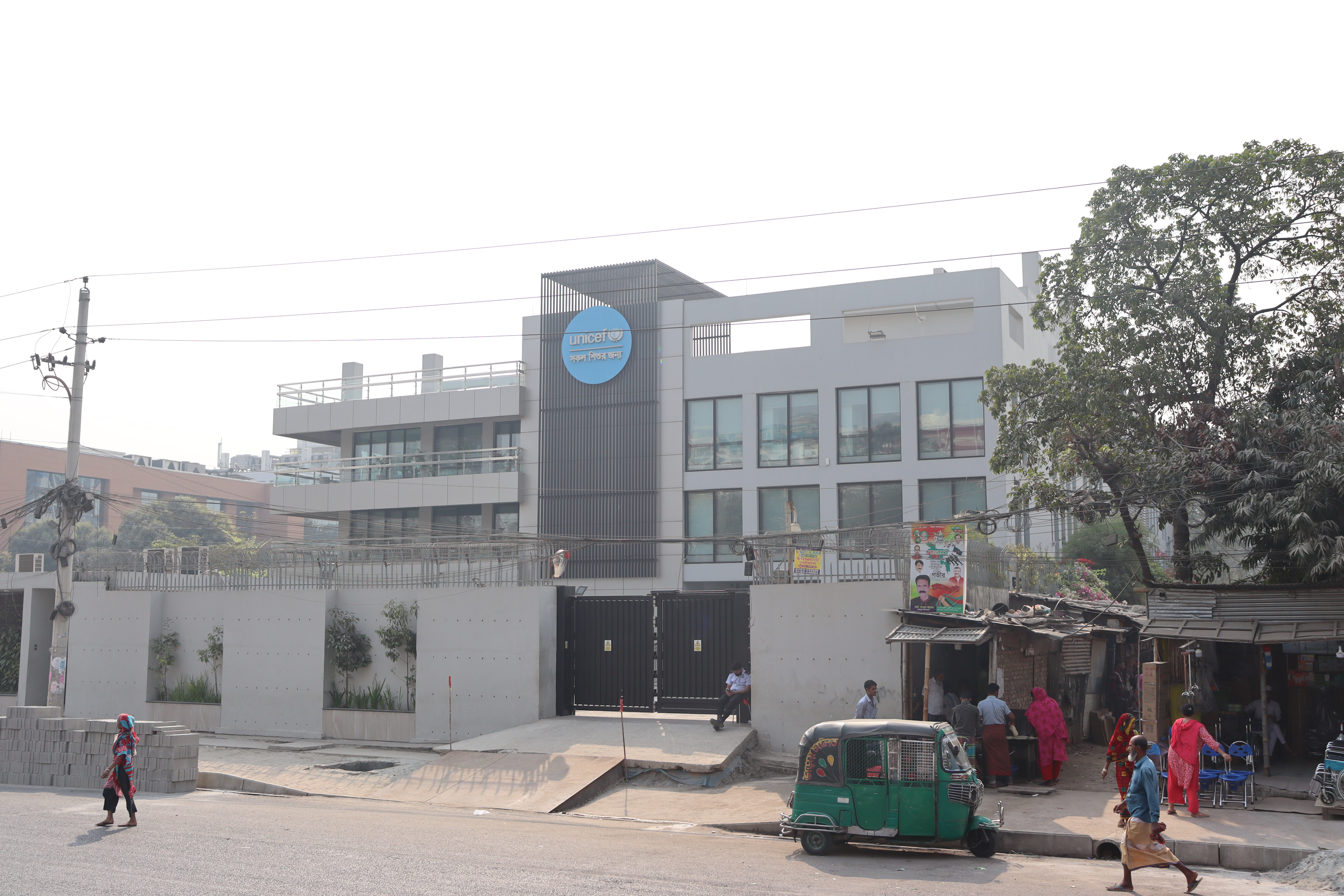
Bangladesh Country Office, UNICEF

UNICEF has launched its 2022-2026 Country Programme, in close coordination with the Bangladesh Government. The main goal is to advance the rights of children, especially those who are unheard and disadvantaged.

They are using the life-cycle approach, in which activities are organised to provide support to children based on their age group. The approach identifies specific priorities and plans for each age group, like infants and their mothers, children at primary school age, and adolescents. These are supported by the rights of children.

== UNICEF Bangladesh Campaigns ==
UNICEF Bangladesh has launched "Every Child ALIVE" a global campaign on 20 February 2018. The goal was to issue an urgent appeal to the government, health care providers, donors, the private sector, families, and businesses to keep every child alive. The global campaign was focus on 10 countries: Bangladesh, Ethiopia, Guinea-Bissau, India, Indonesia, Malawi, Mali, Nigeria, Pakistan, and the United Republic of Tanzania.

UNICEF Bangladesh also launched a national multimedia campaign "Ending Child Marriage" on 31 July 2017

== UNICEF Bangladesh Ambassadors ==
UNICEF Ambassadors are the public figures from various fields like film, television, music, sports, and beyond. They have played a critical role in fundraising for children. Also, they use their talent and fame to advocate, and educate on behalf of UNICEF.

Being a public figure, they help in mobilizing the necessary support to improve the lives of children and ensure their basic human rights

The list of Ambassadors includes Arifa Zaman Moushumi (Actress), Jewel Aich (Magician), Shakib Al Hasan (National Cricket player), Mushfiqur Rahim (National Cricket player), Bidya Sinha Saha Mim (Actress), Farzana Faruk Jhumu (Climate Activist).
