= Tariq ul Hakim =

Bangladeshi Judge

- তারিক উল হাকিম

Justice Dhaka High Court

Personal details
- Born: 20 September 1953 (age 72)
- Spouse: Advocate Nasima Hakim
- Children: 2
- Parent: Maksum-ul-Hakim (father)
- Profession: Judge

Tariq ul Hakim is a retired justice of the Supreme Court of Bangladesh.

== Early life ==
Justice Tariqul Ul Hakim son of a diplomat and third generation High Court Justice in Bangladesh, after his father Justice Maksum-ul-Hakim former ambassador and justice of the Bangladesh High Court and his maternal grandfather Justice Amin Ahmed former Chief Justice of East Pakistan.

Hakim completed his legal education, postgraduate law degree from the UK and was called to Bar of England and Wales from Gray's Inn.

== Career ==
In August 2004, Hakim and Justice Abdul Matin ordered the government to release thousands of prisoners detained without a trial, described in the verdict as a violation of prisoners constitutional rights.

Hakim and Justice Farah Mahbub granted bail in November 2008 to former Prime Minister Moudud Ahmed in the Fixed Deposit Receipt embezzlement case. On 15 September 2008, bombs were thrown at the official residence of Hakim in judges' complex in Kakrail, Dhaka. On 11 October, bombs were thrown at the official residence of another judge, Justice Sharif Uddin Chaklader, in the complex. Following which, Justice Md Imman Ali and Justice Md Ashfaqul Islam sought an investigative report on the incidents from the government.

In May 2009, Hakim and Justice Zinat Ara accepted the petition by former Prime Minister Khaleda Zia challenging the government cancellation of the allocation of her house in Dhaka Cantonment. The Court adjourned the trial after the government assured it that Zia wouldn't be evicted before the trial started. Justice Kamrul Islam Siddiqui and Justice M. Azizul Haque, from two separate benches, refused to hear the case as they felt "embarrassed".

In June 2010, Hakim and Justice Soumendra Sarker ordered the government to not torture Mahmudur Rahman, editor of Amar Desh, in custody.

In June 2012, Hakim was assigned to hearing cases regarding bank loan disputes, appeals to labour court verdicts, and VAT and customs disputes.

In November 2016, Hakim and Justice Md Faruque asked the government to explain why its failure to locate a government doctor of the Directorate General of Health Services, Muhammed Iqbal Mahmud, should not be declared negligence. Mahmud was seen in security footage being forcefully loaded into a microbus by seven or eight people in Dhaka. In June 2017, Mahmud was found in Laxmipur District with his eyes tied nearly eight months after his abduction.

In March 2019, Hakim and Justice Md Shohrowardi in a verdict ordered the government to not prevent Afroza Abbas, president of Jatiyatabadi Mohila Dal and wife of Mirza Abbas, from traveling outside of Bangladesh. In July, Hakim and Justice Md Shohrowardi ordered the government to not hinder Imran H. Sarker from travelling outside of Bangladesh. Hakim and Justice Md Shohrowardi ordered the government to take action to prevent H Industries from removing groundwater in Patiya Upazila due to which villagers in the area where unable to access groundwater, whose level had fallen. Hakim and Justice Md Iqbal Kabir questioned why the government order removing Pirojpur's District and Sessions Judge Md Abdul Mannan is not an illegal order. Mannan was suspended after sending AKMA Awal, a former member of parliament of the Awami League, and his wife to jail in three corruption case. Hakim was appointed a judge on the Appellate Division of the Supreme Court on 2 September 2020. He retired on 18 September 2020.
