= Murder of Sohagi Jahan Tonu =

2016 murder in Bangladesh

The murder of Sohagi Jahan Tonu refers to the gang rape and murder of Sohagi Jahan Tonu, a Bangladeshi student, by some army officers.

== History ==
Tonu was a 19-year-old student of Comilla Victoria College. Her father was an employee of Comilla Cantonment board. Her dead body was found on 20 March 2016 in Comilla Cantonment. She had gone to study at a private tutor's place when she disappeared.

=== Investigation ===
Tonu's father Yaar Hossain, filed a murder case with Kotwali Model Police Station in Comilla against individuals. The police transferred the case to Detective Branch. The case was handed out to the Criminal Investigation Department on 1 April 2016. The first autopsy found no evidence of rape or murder, which was released on 4 April 2016. The report created controversy. Bangladesh High Court ordered a second autopsy. The initial autopsy was conducted in Chittagong Medical College. She was buried in Mirzapur, in Muradnagar Upazila, Comilla District.

The second autopsy conducted in Comilla Medical College Hospital did find evidence of rape. A DNA test conducted under the Criminal Investigation Department found evidence of rape through DNA testing in May 2016. Semen from three men was found in Tonu's underwear by the crime lab of CID.

CID quizzed an army officer's son, Piyal, who allegedly had harassed her several times. CID also interrogated two army personnel.

Tonu's parents claimed that an army sergeant named Zahid and his wife were involved in the incident. However, no such persons were interrogated by the authorities.

Even after four years of investigation, authorities were unable to make any headway.

On October 21, 2020, the Criminal Investigation Department handed the case over to PBI.

== Protests ==
The murder created nationwide protests in Bangladesh and stated a social media movement. Protests took places in campuses all over Bangladesh and Bangladesh Students' Union led a protest towards the Prime Ministers office.

== See also ==
- Murder of Nusrat Jahan Rafi
- Border shooting of Felani Khatun
