= 2018–2019 Bangladesh drug war =

Crackdown in 2018

- Policemen arrested drug sellers in Dhaka
Date	1 May 2018 – 16 February 2019
Location	Bangladesh
Result	Bangladeshi government victory

Belligerents
Bangladesh: Bangladesh Police; Rapid Action Battalion	Drug dealers gangs: Kamrul Islam gang; Riazul Islam gang; Akramul Haque gang	Harkat-ul-Jihad al-Islami Jamaat-ul-Mujahideen Bangladesh

Commanders and leaders
(Bangladesh) Mohammad Abdul Hamid (Bangladesh) Sheikh Hasina	Kamrul Islam †; Akramul Haque †; Riazul Islam †	Shah Sahib

Strength
12000	Unknown	Unknown

Casualties and losses
- 466–800+ deaths

The 2018–2019 Bangladesh drug war or 2018–2019 Bangladesh's war on drugs was a campaign against alleged drug dealers and users by the government of Bangladesh under Prime Minister Sheikh Hasina. The extrajudicial killings of alleged drug dealers by the elite anti-crime unit Rapid Action Battalion (RAB) and the police have been criticized by various human rights groups and foreign diplomats. The conflict ended in 2019 with the victory of the Bangladeshi government.

== Background ==
Bangladesh has an unknown number of drug addicts, with estimates ranging from 100,000 to 4 million. Since 2015, the Bangladesh government has focused on eradicating a cheap methamphetamine tablet known as yaba, and police have made significant pill seizures during that time. According to a 2016 Bangladeshi official estimate, more than 29 million yaba tablets were confiscated in 2016, up from 1.3 million in 2011. There are allegations that a number of the larger dealers are linked to the then ruling Awami League party, and affiliated groups such as Jubo League, and Swechasebok League.

== Events ==
Bangladesh started a major yaba crackdown in mid-May, 2018 in response to a surging trade of the drug. Fifty-two accused drug dealers were confirmed killed in the first 10 days of the operation. According to a Bangladesh Police spokesperson, about 15,000 people were arrested in nationwide raids in the first three weeks of the operation. 22,000 people were arrested between mid-May 2018 to July 2018 as a result of alleged involvement in the drug trade. According to Odhikar, a Dhaka-based human rights group, 211 drug suspects were killed from mid-May 2018 to July 2018, more than a third of whom were arrested first. Most of the killings followed a common script: alleged drug dealers died in "gunfights", usually at night, with weapons and drugs discovered near the deceased drug dealers.

Some of the notable incidents of killing are:

- Kamrul Islam, 35, who was accused of 15 cases, including drug possession and illegal possession of firearms. Whilst he was never convicted, he was gunned down on 25 May 2018. His wife claimed that Islam had quit drug dealing after their first daughter was born, 10 years ago.
- Akramul Haque was shot dead by Bangladesh's Rapid Action Battalion (RAB), who claimed Haque was a drug dealer. Haque's wife released an unverified 15-minute phone call recording that captured the last moments of her husband's life on 27 May 2018, in Cox's Bazar.
- Riazul Islam was arrested by Bangladesh Police as he was walking home from his in-laws' house. Later, he was shot dead while two officers were wounded according to Bangladesh Police. The hospital record showed that a single bullet entered Islam's head near his left ear and exited near his right, while each of the two police officers were treated for small areas of tenderness and swelling on one of their hands.

After nearly a year-long crackdown on illegal drug trade, over 100 drug dealers reportedly surrendered on 16 February 2019, ending the conflict.

== Controversy ==
According to The Daily Telegraph, there are allegations that the campaign is a "cover for a wave of extrajudicial killings and political intimidation ahead of a general election later this year". In a cited incident, Habibur Rahman, an activist for the opposition party, was killed in an alleged shootout. His family said that he had been arrested at a mosque and had never used drugs. The U.N. High Commissioner for Human Rights, the European Union, Human Rights Watch, Marcia Bernicat, and the US ambassador to Bangladesh all expressed concern over the number of people killed.

Prime Minister Sheikh Hasina denied that any innocent people were being harassed and Asaduzzaman Khan, the Minister of Home Affairs, dismissed any allegation of extrajudicial killing. One police officer in charge of an operation that ended with the killing of an alleged drug dealer said drug use led to crime and claimed that arresting drug dealers did not help.

They come out on bail and they do the same thing, selling and using drugs ... Every drug dealer should be killed. Then drugs can be controlled.

Home Minister Asaduzzaman Khan denied allegations that the police were executing suspects without taking them through the judicial process. "Our law enforcement people don't execute anyone. If they do so, they will going against ethics, and will be fired if investigations prove they acted outside the law. This is not a lawless country," he told Reuters.

There have been strong allegations that no actions have been taken against ruling party MP, Abdur Rahman Badi and associate despite reports from five state agencies that mentioned him as patron of the drug trade.

== See also ==
- Mexican drug war
- Brazilian drug war
- Philippine drug war
- Miami drug war
- Ecuadorian drug war
