= Ain o Salish Kendra =

Bangladesh human rights organization

Ain o Salish Kendra (ASK)
- Founded: 1986
- Type: Non-profit, Interest group
- Location: Administrative headquarters in Dhaka, Bangladesh
- Region served: Bangladesh
- Services: Legal and social support to the dis empowered, particularly women, working children and workers
- Website: www.askbd.org

The Ain o Salish Kendra (ASK) (Bengali: আইন ও সালিশ কেন্দ্র (আসক); Centre for Law and Mediation) is a non-governmental legal aid and human rights organisation in Bangladesh. It is one of the leading human rights organizations of the country and is highly active in issues of legal and social support to the dis empowered, particularly women, working children and workers as well as exposing human rights abuses by Bangladeshi security forces. It consults with Amnesty International and with the United Nations Economic and Social Council (ECOSOC). The centre was established by prominent Bangladeshi lawyers and activists in 1986.

The organisation provides legal and social support to the dis empowered, particularly women, working children and workers. Its goal is to create a society based on equality, social and gender justice and rule of law. It seeks to create an environment for accountability and transparency of governance institutions.

ASK was registered with the Registrar of Joint Stock Companies, Bangladesh under the Societies Registration Act, XXI in 1986, and with the NGO Affairs Bureau under Foreign Donation Regulation Ordinance, 1978 in 1993. It was accorded special consultative status with ECOSOC in 1998.

== ASK's Strategies ==
ASK's strategies for promotion and protection of human rights are carried out by 17 units and one component to create awareness, provide legal and social support, monitor institutional transparency, campaign and advocacy for law and policy reform.

Units of ASK

- Investigation
- Documentation
- Publication & Communications
- Legal Advocacy & Policy Reform
- Media & International Advocacy
- Mediation & Rapid Response
- Litigation
- Outreach
- Halfway Home
- Psycho-social & Counseling
- Human Rights Awareness
- Gender and Social Justice
- Training
- Child Rights
- Administration
- Finance and Accounts
- Planning, Monitoring & Evaluation
