= Majid-ul-Haq =

Bangladeshi politician

Majidul Haque

Minister of Water Resources
- In office 3 April 1996 – 23 June 1996
- Preceded by: Abdul Mannan Bhuiyan
- Succeeded by: Abdur Razzaq

Minister of Agriculture
- In office 1 March 1991 – 27 June 1995
- Preceded by: A. M. Anisuzzaman
- Succeeded by: Abdul Mannan Bhuiyan

Minister of Ports Shipping and IWT
- In office 27 November 1981 – 11 February 1982
- Preceded by: Captain Nurul Huq
- Succeeded by: Shamsul Huda Chaudhury

Minister of Road Transport and Bridges
- In office 9 December 1977 – 29 June 1978
- Preceded by: M. H. Khan
- Succeeded by: Mashiur Rahman

Member of Parliament
- In office 1 March 1991 – 10 June 1996
- Preceded by: M. A. Matin
- Succeeded by: Muhammad Serajul Akbar
- Constituency: Magura-1
- In office 18 February 1979 – 24 March 1982
- Preceded by: Ekhlas Uddin Ahmed
- Succeeded by: Position Abolished
- Constituency: Jessore-12

Personal details
- Born: 19 October 1926 (age 99) Magura, Jessore District, Bengal Presidency
- Relatives: Shamsun Nahar Ahmed (sister)

Military service
- Allegiance: British India (Before 1947); Pakistan (Before 1973); Bangladesh
- Branch/service: British Indian Army; Pakistan Army; Bangladesh Army
- Years of service: 1947–1982
- Rank: Major General
- Unit: Corps of Engineers
- Commands: Commander of 14th Independent Engineers Brigade; Commander of 26th Infantry Brigade; Director of Engineers at Army Headquarters; GOC of the 11th Infantry Division
- Battles/wars: Indo-Pakistani War of 1965

Majid-ul-Haq (Bengali: মজিদ-উল-হক; 1926 – 25 March 2013) was a retired two-star officer of the Bangladesh Army and politician. Haque served as minister of several ministries under Ziaur Rahman and Khaleda Zia administrations.

== Early life ==
Majidul Haque was born in Magura on 19 October 1926. He grew up in Delhi, where his father worked in the Indian Central Government. After completing his schooling at Raisina Bengali High School, he went on to do his Intermediate at Hindu College. He then enrolled in a BA (Honours) in English at the same college. However, the death of his father forced him to rethink his career, and he switched to engineering at the Bengal College of Engineering, Shibpur. In 1946, he joined the British Indian Army and underwent training at the Indian Military Academy.

== Military career ==
In 1947, he was transferred to Pakistan and commissioned as a regular officer in the Pakistan Army on 20 October 1947, subsequently joining the Corps of Engineers. He had various field and staff postings in both East and West Pakistan, including Sialkot, Mardan, Risalpur, Kashmir, Rawalpindi, Dhaka, Quetta, Karachi, and the Karakoram Heights. He was also briefly deputed to the Planning Department in Dhaka. He attended the Command and General Staff College at Fort Leavenworth, Leavenworth County, Kansas, United States, but was recalled when the 1965 War broke out between India and Pakistan. He was also posted to the Pakistan Navy in Karachi.

After the declaration of martial law in 1969, he was posted as Deputy Martial Law Administrator in East Pakistan. A disagreement with one of his former West Pakistani colleagues led to his being sent back to General Headquarters in Rawalpindi before the 1970 elections. In September 1971, he and his family were moved to detention camps, first in Kohat and then in Mandi Bahauddin.

== Life in Bangladesh ==
Repatriated to independent Bangladesh in 1973, he served in various capacities, including as chairman of the Bangladesh Steel Corporation and special secretary with the rank and status of state minister, minister for industries, establishment, water resources, port and shipping, jute and textiles, and agriculture under various governments. He played an active role in the movement for the restoration of democracy against President Ershad. In June 1996, he resigned from the Standing Committee of the Bangladesh Nationalist Party, and in 2001, he left the party. Majid-ul-Haq published a memoir, Unknown, Unhonoured and Unsung, in 2012.

Major General Majid-ul-Haq died on 25 March 2013. His wife, Mumtaz Jahan Zeb-Un-Nisa Majid, died 10 days before he did.

His only sister was Shamsun Nahar Ahmed, and he had four other brothers. Their father, "Z Ahmed", died in 1943.
