= Minister of Shipping (Bangladesh) =

Cabinet office in the Bangladeshi government

People's Republic of Bangladesh Adviser of Shipping
- বাংলাদেশের নৌপরিবহন উপদেষ্টা
- Government Seal of Bangladesh

- Flag of Bangladesh

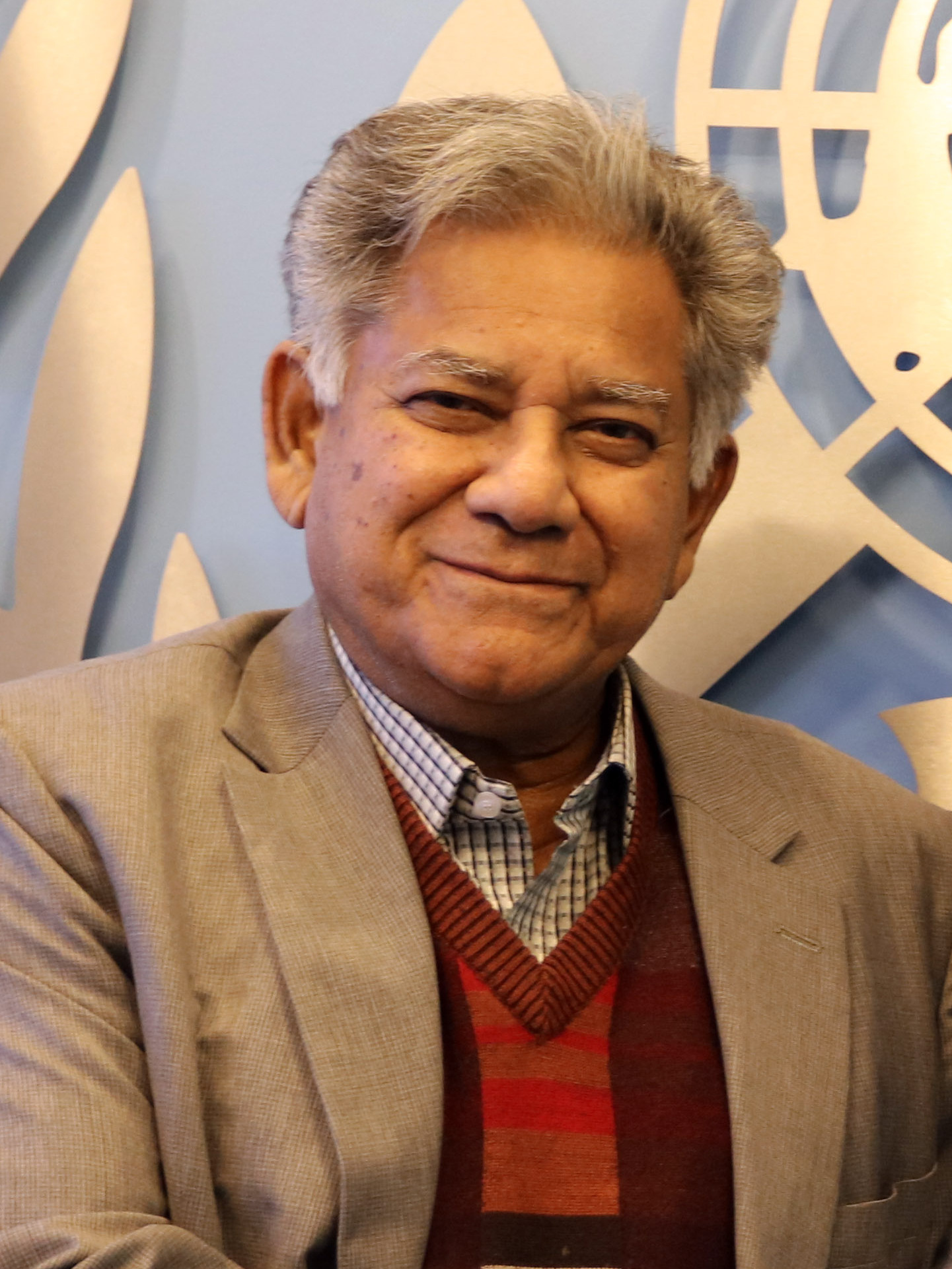
- Incumbent; M Sakhawat Hussain since 22 August 2024
- Ministry of Shipping
- Style: The Honourable (formal); His Excellency (diplomatic)
- Type: Cabinet minister
- Status: Adviser
- Member of: Cabinet; Advisory Council
- Reports to: Chief Adviser
- Seat: Bangladesh Secretariat
- Nominator: Chief Adviser of Bangladesh
- Appointer: President of Bangladesh; on the advice of the chief adviser
- Term length: Interim or the; chief adviser's pleasure
- Formation: 20 January 1972; 54 years ago
- Salary: ৳245000 (US$2,000) per month (incl. allowances)
- Website: mos.gov.bd

The minister of shipping of Bangladesh is the minister in charge of the Ministry of Shipping within the government of Bangladesh. He is also the minister of all departments and agencies under the Ministry of Shipping.

== List ==
Parties

No party Bangladesh Nationalist Party Bangladesh Awami League Jatiya Party

No.	Portrait	Name	Took office	Left office	Head of government
		M. A. G. Osmani	13 April 1972	7 April 1974	Sheikh Mujibur Rahman
		Sheikh Mujibur Rahman	8 July 1974	26 January 1975	Sheikh Mujibur Rahman
		Muhammad Mansur Ali	26 January 1975	15 August 1975	Sheikh Mujibur Rahman
		Asaduzzaman Khan	20 August 1975	6 November 1975	Khondaker Mostaq Ahmad
		M. H. Khan	26 November 1975	24 January 1976	Abu Sadat Mohammad Sayem
		Nurul Huq	9 December 1977	27 November 1981	Ziaur Rahman; Abdus Sattar
		Majid-ul-Haq	27 November 1981	11 February 1982	Abdus Sattar
		Shamsul Huda Chaudhury	12 February 1982	5 March 1982	Abdus Sattar
		Sultan Ahmed	5 March 1982	24 March 1982	Abdus Sattar
		Mahbub Ali Khan	27 March 1982	10 May 1982	A. F. M. Ahsanuddin Chowdhury
		Mahbub Ali Khan	8 March 1984	1 June 1984	Hussain Muhammad Ershad
		Md. Reazuddin Ahmed	1 June 1984	15 January 1985	Hussain Muhammad Ershad
		Sultan Ahmed	16 September 1985	9 July 1986	Hussain Muhammad Ershad
		AKM Maidul Islam	9 July 1986	30 November 1986	Hussain Muhammad Ershad
		Kazi Zafar Ahmed	30 November 1986	10 August 1987	Hussain Muhammad Ershad
		AKM Maidul Islam	10 August 1987	27 March 1988	Hussain Muhammad Ershad
		Md Korban Ali	27 March 1988	6 August 1988	Hussain Muhammad Ershad
		Mamdudur Rahman Chowdhury	6 August 1988	23 July 1990	Hussain Muhammad Ershad
		Rafiqul Islam	29 July 1990	6 December 1990	Hussain Muhammad Ershad
		Mohammad Keramat Ali	10 December 1990	15 March 1991	Shahabuddin Ahmed
		M. K. Anwar	20 March 1991	29 July 1991	Khaleda Zia
		M. K. Anwar	13 August 1993	18 October 1995	Khaleda Zia
		Syed Manzur Elahi	3 April 1996	23 June 1996	Habibur Rahman
		Sheikh Hasina	23 June 1996	29 June 1996	Sheikh Hasina
		A. S. M. Abdur Rab	29 June 1996	24 December 1998	Sheikh Hasina
		Syed Manzur Elahi	16 July 2001	10 October 2001	Latifur Rahman
		Akbar Hossain	11 October 2001	25 June 2006	Khaleda Zia
		M. Azizul Haq	1 November 2006	11 January 2007	Iajuddin Ahmed
		M. A. Matin	14 January 2007	5 January 2009	Fakhruddin Ahmed
		Muhammad Afsarul Ameen	6 January 2009	30 July 2009	Sheikh Hasina
		Shajahan Khan	31 July 2009	7 January 2019	Sheikh Hasina
		Khalid Mahmud Chowdhury	7 January 2019	6 August 2024	Sheikh Hasina
		Muhammad Yunus	9 August 2024	26 August 2024	Muhammad Yunus
		M Sakhawat Hussain	27 August 2024	Incumbent	Muhammad Yunus

== See also ==
- ABM Zahidul Haq, former Bangladesh deputy minister of shipping
- Bangladesh Marine Fisheries Academy
