= Ekhlas Uddin Ahmed =

Ekhlas Uddin Ahmed may refer to:

- Ekhlasuddin Ahmed, Bangladeshi children's writer
- Ekhlas Uddin Ahmed (politician), Bangladeshi politician
