= Asaduzzaman Khan (politician, born 1916) =

Bangladeshi politician

- আসাদুজ্জামান খান
- Khan in 1997

Leader of the Opposition
- In office 18 February 1979 – 24 March 1982
- President: Ziaur Rahman; Abdus Sattar
- Prime Minister: Shah Azizur Rahman
- Preceded by: Office established
- Succeeded by: Sheikh Hasina

Minister of Ports Shipping and IWT
- In office 20 August 1975 – 6 November 1975
- President: Khondaker Mostaq Ahmad
- Preceded by: Muhammad Mansur Ali
- Succeeded by: M. H. Khan

Jute Minister of Bangladesh
- In office 25 January 1975 – 15 August 1975
- President: Sheikh Mujibur Rahman
- Prime Minister: Muhammad Mansur Ali

Member of Parliament
- In office 18 February 1979 – 24 March 1982
- Preceded by: Mostafa MA Matin
- Succeeded by: Position Abolished
- Constituency: Mymensingh-18
- In office 7 March 1973 – 6 November 1975
- Preceded by: Position Established
- Succeeded by: Position Abolished
- Constituency: Mymensingh-26

Member of Constituent Assembly of Bangladesh
- In office 10 April 1972 – 16 December 1972
- Preceded by: Position Established
- Succeeded by: Position Abolished
- Constituency: Mymensingh-15

Personal details
- Born: c. 1916 Kishoreganj, Bengal Presidency, British India
- Died: 21 January 1992 (aged 75–76) Dhaka, Bangladesh
- Party: Awami League
- Education: University of Dhaka

Asaduzzaman Khan (Bengali: আসাদুজ্জামান খান; c. 1916 – 21 January 1992) was a Bangladeshi politician who served as the minister of shipping and jute in the third Mujib ministry.

== Early life ==
Khan was born in 1916 in Kishoreganj, East Bengal, British Raj. He finished law degree from the University of Dhaka. He also obtained an BA (Hons) and M.A. degree in history from there.

== Career ==
In 1941, Khan joined the Bengal Civil Service. He joined the judicial branch in 1945. In 1951 he resigned from his government service. He joined the University of Dhaka's Law Department as a part-time lecturer in 1952. In the same year he joined the District & Sessions Judge Court, Dhaka as a Lawyer. In 1965, he was elected to the East Pakistan Provincial Assembly in 1965. He served as the leader of the opposition in the assembly 1967 and served the position until 1969. He joined Awami League in 1969. He served as the minister of jute in the cabinet of Sheikh Mujibur Rahman in 1975 and later the Minister of Ports Shipping and IWT in the Mostaq Ahmad ministry. In 1979, he was elected head of the Awami League and served as the Leader of the Opposition.

== Death ==
Khan died on 21 January 1992 in Dhaka, Bangladesh.
