= A. T. M. Abdul Wahab =

Bangladeshi politician

Abu Talib Muhammad Abdul Wahab

Member of Parliament of Magura-1
- In office 2015 – 30 December 2018
- Preceded by: Muhammad Serajul Akbar
- Succeeded by: Saifuzzaman Shikhor

Chairman, Bangladesh Red Crescent Society (BDRCS)

Personal details
- Born: 29 December 1946 (age 79) Magura, Bengal, British India
- Party: Bangladesh Awami League

Military service
- Allegiance: Pakistan (before 1971); Bangladesh
- Branch/service: Pakistan Army; Bangladesh Army; Bangladesh Rifles
- Years of service: 1969 – 2003
- Rank: Major General
- Unit: East Bengal Regiment
- Commands: Sub-commander of Sector – VIII; Station Commander, Comilla; Commander of 81st Infantry Brigade; Deputy Director of Bangladesh Rifles; Commander of 309th Infantry Brigade; GOC of 55th Infantry Division
- Battles/wars: Bangladesh Liberation War

A. T. M. Abdul Wahab (Bengali: এ টি এম ‍আব্দুল ওয়াহাব) is a Bangladesh Awami League politician and a former member of parliament from Magura-1.

== Early life ==
Wahab was born on 29 December 1946. He fought in the Bangladesh Liberation War as the sub-sector commander of Sector Eight.

== Career ==
Wahab retired from the Bangladesh Army with the rank of major general. He wrote a book, Mukti Bahini Wins Victory: Military Oligarchy Divides Pakistan in 1971, about the history of the Bangladesh Liberation War.

Wahab was elected to parliament in 2015 from Magura-1 as a candidate of the Bangladesh Awami League in a by-election. The by-election was called after the death of the incumbent member of parliament, Muhammad Serajul Akbar. He was selected out of 17 potential candidates interviewed by the Awami League Parliamentary Board.

In June 2021, Transparency International Bangladesh reported widespread corruption, mismanagement, and political interference at the Holy Family Red Crescent Medical College Hospital. The report blamed the chairman of the Bangladesh Red Crescent Society, Wahab.
