= Md. Shifuzzaman =

Bangladeshi politician

- সাইফুজ্জামান শিখর
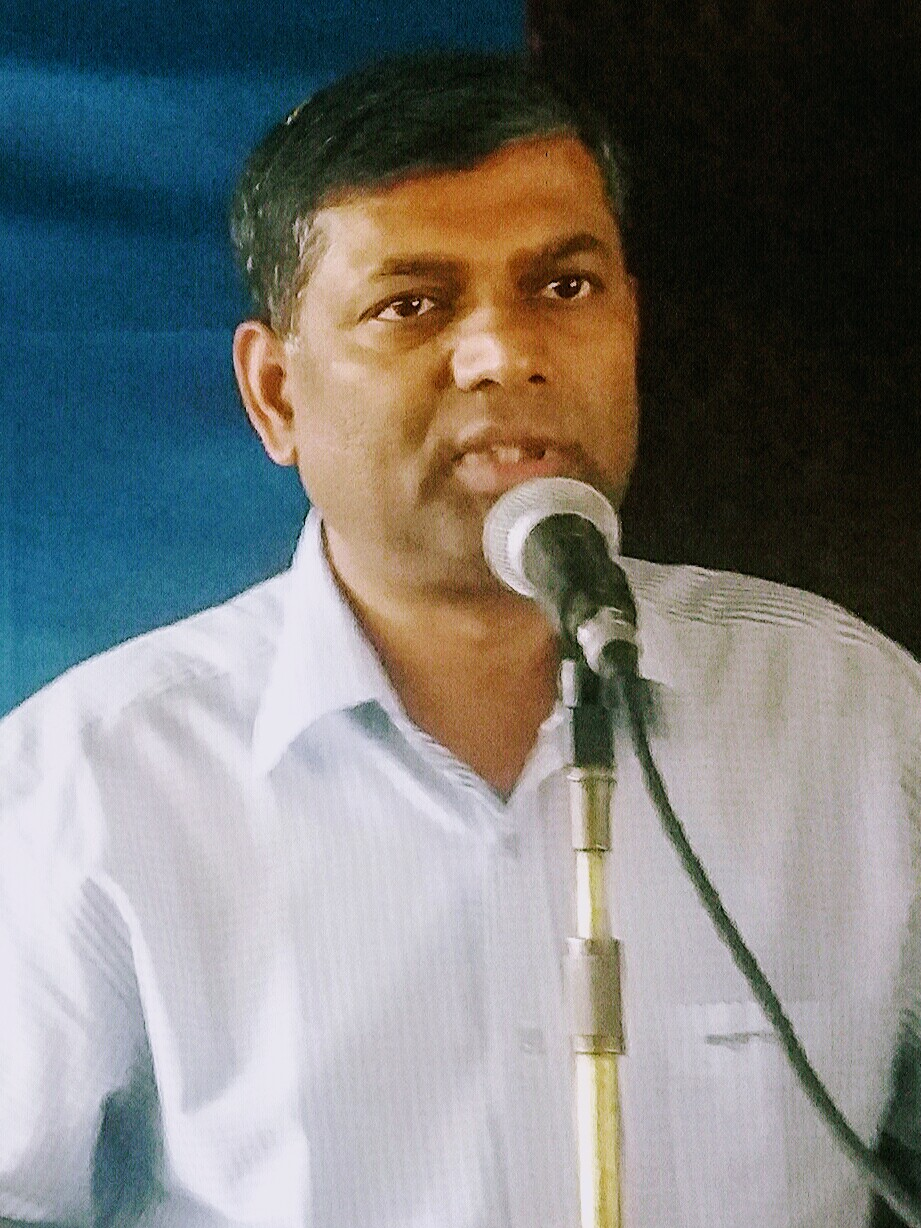
- Shikhor in 2017

Member of Parliament for Magura-1
- In office 29 January 2019 – 10 January 2024
- Preceded by: ATM Abdul Wahab
- Succeeded by: Shakib Al Hasan

Personal details
- Born: 1 October 1971 (age 55)
- Party: Bangladesh Awami League
- Parent: Mohammad Asaduzzaman (father)
- Education: Rajshahi University
- Occupation: Politician, lawyer

Md. Shifuzzaman Shikhor (born 1 October 1971) is a Bangladeshi politician who is the former Jatiya Sangsad member representing the Magura-1 constituency. He is connected to the politics of Bangladesh Awami League. His father was Mohammad Asaduzzaman, an MP of Magura-2 constituency and his sister Kamrul Laila Jolly was also an MP.

== Early life ==
Shifuzzaman Shikhor was born in Magura District, Bangladesh on 1 October 1971. His father, Mohammad Asaduzzaman, served in the National Parliament as the representative for Magura-2 constituency. His mother Manowara Zaman was a homemaker. Shifuzzaman Shikhor is the third child out of five brothers and two sisters. He has been in politics since his school days. After enrolling in college, he was nominated as the sports secretary for the student parliament election in Magura. He was pursuing an honors and a master's degree in the Department of History at University of Rajshahi. He served as the Sher-e-Bangla Hall organizing secretary of the Bangladesh Chhatra League. He worked on the ground in the movement to topple the then-autocratic Hussain Mohammad Ershad government.

After completing his law degree from National University, he spent 18 years working as a lawyer at the Dhaka Bar. He was appointed as general secretary of the Bangladesh Chhatra League at the University of Rajshahi after the Awami League won the 1996 election. In 1997, he moved to Dhaka and joined the Bangladesh Chhatra League central committee. Later he served as acting general secretary of Bangladesh Chhatra League for 7 months. He was an assistant private secretary of the Prime Minister Sheikh Hasina.

== Career ==
Shikhor was involved with Bangladesh Student League, student wing of Bangladesh Awami League in his student life. He is elected as MP for the first time in Bangladesh General Election 2018 from Magura-1. He was an APS of Bangladeshi Prime Minister Sheikh Hasina.

Shikhor filed a case against Shafiqul Islam Kajol, a journalist, under the Digital Security Act after Kajol had published an article linking him to a prostitution ring.

In August 2024, Anti-Corruption Commission of Bangladesh decided to investigate the allegations of corruption brought against Shikhor.
