= M. A. Matin (Magura politician) =

Bangladeshi politician

- এম. এ. মতিন

Member of Parliament for Magura-1
- In office 1986–1990
- Preceded by: Constituency Established
- Succeeded by: Majid-ul-Haq

Personal details
- Party: Jatiya Party

Military service
- Allegiance: Pakistan (Before 1972); Bangladesh
- Branch/service: Bangladesh Army; Pakistan Army
- Years of service: 1953–1983
- Rank: Major General
- Unit: Corps of Engineers
- Commands: Commandant of Engineers Centre and School of Military Engineering; Station Commander, Bogra; Commander of 222nd Infantry Brigade; ENC of Army Headquarters
- Battles/wars: Indo-Pakistani War of 1965

Major General M. A. Matin is a Bangladeshi military official and politician. He was elected as MP of Magura-1 in the third general election and reelected in the fourth general election.
