= Muhammad Serajul Akbar =

Bangladeshi politician

Member of Parliament for Magura-1
- In office 23 June 1996 – 9 March 2015
- Preceded by: Major General Majid-ul-Haq
- Succeeded by: A. T. M. Abdul Wahab

Personal details
- Born: Circa 1944 Magura, Bengal, British India
- Died: 9 March 2015 National Institute of Cardiovascular Disease, Dhaka, Bangladesh
- Party: Bangladesh Awami League

Muhammad Serajul Akbar (c. 1944 – 9 March 2015) was a Bangladesh Awami League politician and member of parliament.

== Biography ==
Akbar was born in 1944 in Magura District. In 1978 he joined Dhaka Shishu Hospital as its director. He joined the Bangladesh Institute of Child Health as a professor. In 1996 he was elected to parliament from Magura-1 on a Bangladesh Awami League nomination. He was re-elected to 2001. He was the President of Magura District unit Awami League. Akbar was re-elected to parliament in 2008 and 2014. He served as the President of Bangladesh Red Crescent Society.

== Death ==
Mohammad Sirajul Akbar had died on 9 March 2015 in National Institute of Cardiovascular Disease, Dhaka, Bangladesh.
