= Holy Family Red Crescent Medical College =

Private medical school and hospital in Dhaka, Bangladesh

- হলি ফ্যামিলি রেড ক্রিসেন্ট মেডিকেল কলেজ
- Other name: HFRCMCH
- Type: Private medical college and hospital
- Established: 1953 (Hospital); 2000 (Medical College)
- Academic affiliations: University of Dhaka
- Principal: K.M Mozibul Haque (Acting)
- Academic staff: 158
- Undergraduates: 827
- Location: Iskaton Garden Road, Ramna, Dhaka, Dhaka Division, Bangladesh; 23.746503°N 90.402597°E
- Campus: Urban, 8.10 acre
- Language: English
- Hospital Beds: 750
- Website: www.hfrcmc.edu.bd

Holy Family Red Crescent Medical College (Bengali: হলি ফ্যামিলি রেড ক্রিসেন্ট মেডিকেল কলেজ) is a private medical college and hospital in Dhaka, Bangladesh.

== History ==
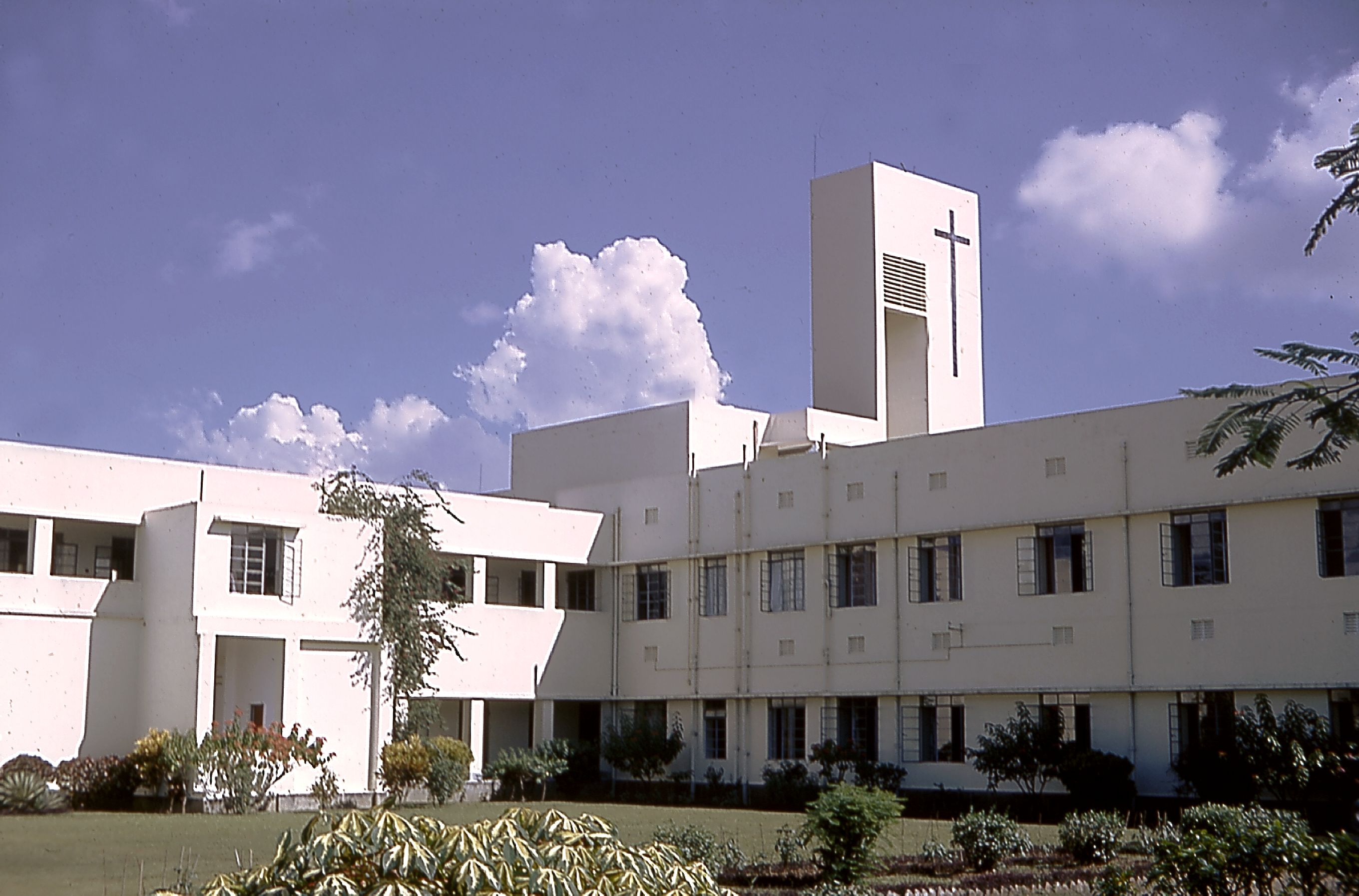
Holy Family Hospital before 1971

In 1953, it was built as the Holy Family Hospital in Maghbazar, Dhaka. It was the main hospital of Dacca, then the capital of East Pakistan. It was a Catholic hospital staffed by nuns, and affiliated with the Red Cross.

During the Bangladesh Liberation War in 1971, it was one of three neutral zones providing shelter to foreign nationals and UN personnel. The other zones were Notre Dame College, Dhaka and InterContinental Dhaka.

In 2000, it established its medical college in Iskaton, Dhaka. It is a college affiliated to Dhaka University. It confers the MBBS degree at the end of a course of five years duration. A one year post graduation internship is mandatory for all graduates. The degree is recognized by Bangladesh Medical and Dental Council.

Doctors and staff at the hospital confined their director, demanding an increase in their pay structure in June 2016. During the COVID-19 pandemic in Bangladesh this hospital was used as a dedicated COVID-19 hospital. In 2022, a professor of the medical school was suspended after police charged him with sexual harassment of a student.

In June 2021, Transparency International Bangladesh published a report on the hospital which alleged widespread corruption, mismanagement, and political interference at the Holy Family Red Crescent Medical College Hospital. The hospital is struggling with declining patient admissions, overstaffing, and poor service quality. The report blamed the chairman of the Bangladesh Red Crescent Society, Major General (retired) ATM Abdul Wahab, for the situation. It recommended governance reforms, workforce restructuring, and increasing transparency.

The Daily Star reported in 2024 that the hospital owed 53.2 million BDT in holding tax to the Dhaka South City Corporation, making it one of top five tax defaulting institute under the city corporation. The director of the hospital, Brigadier General (retired) SM Humayun Kabir, said that the hospital had sought a tax waiver as a non-profit.

== Notable staff ==
- Zohra Begum Kazi, first Bengali Muslim female physician.
