= AKM Hafizuddin =

Bangladeshi politician, diplomat, government official

- এ কে এম হাফিজউদ্দিন

Adviser to the Ministry of Industries of Bangladesh
- In office 23 January 1976 – 10 July 1977
- Preceded by: Mirza Nurul Huda
- Succeeded by: Jamal Uddin Ahmad

Chairman of ICB
- In office 25 February 1978 – 20 September 1979
- Preceded by: M.L. Rahman
- Succeeded by: Z. Huq

Inspector General of Police
- In office 11 November 1958 – 25 February 1962
- Preceded by: K. A. Haque
- Succeeded by: A. M. A. Kobir

Personal details
- Died: 10 September 1979
- Party: Bangladesh Nationalist Party
- Relatives: Nurul Huq (nephew)
- Education: University of Dhaka

AKM Hafizuddin (died 10 September 1979) was a Bangladeshi politician, diplomat, government official, inspector general of police (Pakistan Period) and minister.

== Career ==
Hafizuddin was the first chairman of the East Pakistan Industrial Development Corporation. He was an ambassador. He was an inspector general of the East Pakistan police.

Hafizuddin served as an advisor to the Ministry of Industries in the cabinet of Abu Sadat Mohammad Sayem from 23 January 1976 to 10 July 1977.

Hafizuddin was the president of the University of Dhaka Alumni Association from 1976 to 1979.

Hafizuddin was the chairman of Investment Corporation of Bangladesh from 25 February 1978 to 20 September 1979.
