= Monowar Hossain Khan =

Bangladeshi Member of Parliament

- মনোয়ার হোসেন খান

Member of Parliament
- Incumbent
- Assumed office 17 February 2026
- Preceded by: Shakib Al Hasan
- Constituency: Magura-1

Convener, Magura District Bangladesh Nationalist Party

Personal details
- Party: Bangladesh Nationalist Party
- Occupation: Politician

Monowar Hossain Khan (born 30 May 1964) is a Bangladeshi politician and the Convener of Magura District unit of Bangladesh Nationalist Party (BNP). He is an elected Member of Parliament from the Magura-1 constituency. He was elected to the Jatiya Sangsad in the 13th national parliamentary election held on 13 February 2026.

== Early life and education ==
Khan was born on 30 May 1964 in Abalpur village, Magura Sadar Upazila, Magura District. His father is Wazed Ali Khan and his mother is Monowara Begum. He completed his Secondary School Certificate (SSC) from Magura Government High School, his Higher Secondary Certificate (HSC) from Government Brajalal College, and earned both his bachelor's and master's degrees from University of Dhaka.

== Political career ==
He has served for many years as the Member Secretary and later the Convener of the Magura District BNP. In the 13th National Parliamentary Election, he was elected as a Member of Parliament from the Magura-1 constituency, winning by a large margin as the BNP candidate with the Sheaf of Paddy symbol. Before his victory, the constituency had mainly been represented by Awami League since 1991.

== Personal life ==
His wife's name is Rowshan Ara Begum.

== See also ==
- Magura-1
- Bangladesh Nationalist Party
