= Nurul Huq (officer) =

Naval officer (1936–2021)

Minister of Ports Shipping and IWT
- In office 4 July 1978 – 27 November 1981
- Preceded by: Himself (as advisor)
- Succeeded by: Majid-ul-Haq
- In office 9 December 1977 – 29 June 1978
- Preceded by: M. H. Khan
- Succeeded by: Himself (as minister)

Minister of Power, Energy and Mineral Resources
- In office 7 April 1979 – 15 April 1979
- Preceded by: Akbar Hossain
- Succeeded by: Moudud Ahmed

Member of Parliament
- In office 18 February 1979 – 24 March 1982

1st Chief of Naval Staff
- In office 7 April 1972 – 6 November 1973
- President: Abu Sayeed Chowdhury
- Prime Minister: Sheikh Mujibur Rahman
- Succeeded by: Musharraf Hussain khan

Personal details
- Born: 12 January 1936 Dohar, Bengal, British India
- Died: 25 January 2021 (aged 85) Dhaka, Bangladesh
- Resting place: Military Graveyard Banani
- Party: Bangladesh Nationalist Party
- Spouse: Hasna Huq (m. 1964)
- Children: 2
- Relatives: AKM Hafizuddin (maternal uncle)

Military service
- Allegiance: Pakistan (before 1972); Bangladesh
- Branch/service: Pakistan Navy; Bangladesh Navy
- Years of service: 1957–1975
- Rank: Captain
- Commands: Chairman of Bangladesh Inland Water Transport Authority; Chief of Naval Staff; PNS Babur; PNS Bakhtiar
- Battles/wars: Indo-Pakistani war of 1965

Nurul Huq (12 January 1936 – 25 January 2021) was a Bangladesh Navy captain who served as the 1st chief of naval staff from 7 April 1972 to 6 November 1973 and the chairman of BIWTA and BIWTC. Huq served in the Ziaur Rahman ministry as the Minister of Ports Shipping and IWT and was one of the founding members of the Bangladesh Nationalist Party, in which he held and elected as a member of parliament in the 1979 Bangladeshi general election.

== Early life and education ==
Huq was born on 12 January 1936 in Dohar Upazila in Dhaka district of Bengal Province in then British India. His father, Abdul Khaleq, was an officer in the Education Department. Huq completed his matriculation from Armanitola Government High School in 1950. He passed intermediate from Dhaka College in 1952.

== Military career ==
In 1953, Huq joined the Joint Services Pre-Cadet Training School in Quetta as a cadet. After passing out from there, he enrolled in the Pakistan Navy Cadet Training School around October 1953. Huq was transferred to Britannia Royal Naval College in Dartmouth from Karachi after six months of instruction. With enthusiasm in engineering, Huq was also voluntarily trained in the Royal Naval Engineering College within his naval training. On 1 January 1957, Huq was commissioned in the Pakistan Navy and completed his basic engineering course in May 1958 from Royal Naval Engineering College. In March 1960 he went back to the Royal Naval Engineering College to complete his marine engineering specialization course. Later he was transferred to the Training Directorate as the staff officer-I at Naval Headquarters. He served there until 1972. After the independence of Bangladesh, he and his wife escaped Pakistan and reached Bangladesh on 27 March 1972.

=== First chief of naval staff ===
After his arrival in Bangladesh, then commander-in-chief of the Bangladesh Army General M.A.G. Osmani appointed him as the commander in chief of the recently established Bangladesh Navy, and he was upgraded to the rank of commander. On 7 April 1972, he was promoted to the chief of naval staff.

== Political career ==
Ziaur Rahman, then president of Bangladesh and chief martial law administrator, offered him a post as an advisor in the President's Council of Advisors with the rank of a cabinet minister. He was given the charge of the Ministry of Ports Shipping and IWT. He officially took the charge on 7 November 1977. After the 1978 Bangladeshi presidential election, the President's Council of Advisors was dissolved, and the cabinet was formed, and Captain Huq sworn in as the Minister of Ports Shipping and IWT.

In the 1979 Bangladeshi general election, he contested on the nomination of the BNP from Dohar. He won that election. After the assassination of Ziaur Rahman, Abdus Sattar was elected as the new president, but he was not included in the cabinet of Abdus Sattar. So his tenure as a minister ended on 27 November 1981, but he continued as a member of parliament till 24 March 1982.

Following the 1982 Bangladeshi coup d'état, corruption cases were filed against him along with four former ministers. Following these, he moved to London. He stayed there for almost 3 years in political asylum. He worked there as the volunteer coordinator and the racial master advisor to the warden at Toynbee Hall. He came back to Bangladesh on 11 September 1984 after being a fugitive for about 3 years. Following his return, he lived a retired life.

== Personal life ==
He married Hasna on 10 January 1964 in Chittagong. The couple had a son and a daughter.

== Books ==
He wrote a book named High Tide - High Time : Reminiscences of a Naval Commander

== Awards and decorations ==

Tamgha-e-Diffa (General Service Medal)	Sitara-e-Harb 1965 War (War Star 1965)	Tamgha-e-Jang 1965 War (War Medal 1965)	Tamgha-e-Jamhuria (Republic Commemoration Medal) 1956

== Death ==
He died on 25 January 2021 at the age of 85 at Combined Military Hospital in Dhaka.

Military offices
New title	Chief of Naval Staff; January 1972 - 6 November 1973	Succeeded by Rear Admiral Musharraf Hussain Khan
