= Shamsun Nahar Ahmed =

Bangladeshi politician

Begum Shamsun Nahar Ahmed
- বেগম শামসুন নাহার আহমেদ

Member of the Bangladesh Parliament for Reserved Women's Seat–9
- In office 5 March 1991 – 24 November 1995

Member of the Bangladesh Parliament for Reserved Women's Seat–22
- In office 2 April 1979 – 24 March 1982
- Preceded by: Position created

Personal details
- Died: 26 October 2017 Dhaka
- Party: Bangladesh Nationalist Party
- Relatives: Majid-ul-Haq (brother)

Begum Shamsun Nahar Ahmed (died 26 October 2017) was a Bangladeshi politician who was elected as member of 5th Jatiya Sangsad of Reserved Seats for Women. She was a politician of Bangladesh Nationalist Party.

Her eldest brother was Majid-ul-Haq, and she had four other brothers. Their father died in 1943. She sang on Radio Pakistan.
