= Magura-1 =

Constituency of Bangladesh's Jatiya Sangsad

Coordinates: 23.49°N 89.42°E

- Constituency for the Jatiya Sangsad
- District: Magura District
- Division: Khulna Division
- Electorate: 400,485 (2024)

Current constituency
- Created: 1984
- Party: Bangladesh Nationalist Party
- Member: Monowar Hossain Khan
- ← 90 Jessore-6 92 Magura-2 →

Magura-1 is a constituency represented in the Jatiya Sangsad (National Parliament) of Bangladesh since 2026 by Monowar Hossain Khan of the Bangladesh Nationalist Party.

== Boundaries ==
The constituency encompasses Sreepur Upazila, Magura Municipality, and nine union parishads of Magura Sadar Upazila: Atharakhada, Bagia, Chaulia, Hazrapur, Jagdal, Kasundi, Maghi, and Raghab Dair.

== History ==
The constituency was created in 1984 from the Jessore-12 constituency when the former Jessore District was split into four districts: Jhenaidah, Jessore, Magura, and Narail.

== Members of Parliament ==
| Election | Member | Party |
|---|---|---|
| 1986 | M. A. Matin | Jatiya Party |
| 1991 | Majid-ul-Haq | Bangladesh Nationalist Party |
| Jun 1996 | Muhammad Serajul Akbar | Awami League |
| 2015 by-election | ATM Abdul Wahab | Awami League |
| 2018 | Saifuzzaman Shikhor | Awami League |
| 2024 | Shakib Al Hasan | Awami League |
| 2026 | Monowar Hossain Khan | Bangladesh Nationalist Party |

== Elections ==
=== Elections in the 2020s ===
General election 2026: Magura-1
| Party | Candidate | Votes | % | ±% |
|---|---|---|---|---|
| BNP | Md Monwar Hossain | 183,666 | 63.54 | N/A |
| Jamaat | Abdul Matin | 88,036 | 30.46 | N/A |
| IAB | Md Nazirul Islam | 13,335 | 4.61 | N/A |
| JP(E) | Md Zaker Hossain Molla | 1,725 | 0.6 | N/A |
| BSD | Shampa Basu | 1,185 | 0.41 | N/A |
| BCP | Adv Kazi Rezaul Hossain | 806 | 0.28 | N/A |
| GOP | Md Khalilur Rahman | 286 | 0.1 | N/A |
| Majority | | 95,630 | 32.99 | −41.71 |
| Turnout | | 289,039 | 68.4 | +35.2 |
| BNP gain from AL | | | | |

=== Elections in the 2010s ===
Muhammad Serajul Akbar died in March 2015. ATM Abdul Wahab of the Awami League was elected in a May 2015 by-election.

Magura-1 by-election, May 2015
| Party | Candidate | Votes | % | ±% |
|---|---|---|---|---|
| AL | ATM Abdul Wahab | 93,181 | 86.6 | +32.0 |
| Independent | Tapan Kumar Singha | 12,790 | 11.9 | N/A |
| National People's Party | Quazi Tauhidul Alam | 902 | 0.8 | N/A |
| BNF | AKM Mutasim Billah | 709 | 0.7 | +0.1 |
| Majority | | 80,391 | 74.7 | +65.4 |
| Turnout | | 107,582 | 33.2 | −0.2 |
| AL hold | | | | |

General Election 2014: Magura-1
| Party | Candidate | Votes | % | ±% |
|---|---|---|---|---|
| AL | Muhammad Serajul Akbar | 56,051 | 54.6 | +0.6 |
| Independent | Tapon Kumar Singho | 46,474 | 45.3 | N/A |
| BNF | AKM Mutasim Billah | 48 | 0.6 | N/A |
| Majority | | 9,577 | 9.3 | −1.0 |
| Turnout | | 102,573 | 33.4 | −57.7 |
| AL hold | | | | |

=== Elections in the 2000s ===
General Election 2008: Magura-1
| Party | Candidate | Votes | % | ±% |
|---|---|---|---|---|
| AL | Muhammad Serajul Akbar | 135,596 | 54.0 | +7.7 |
| BNP | Iqbal Akhter Khan | 109,835 | 43.7 | +2.6 |
| IAB | Moin Uddin Ahmmed | 5,198 | 2.1 | N/A |
| LDP | A. N. Kamal Uddin Mustafa | 577 | 0.2 | N/A |
| Majority | | 25,761 | 10.3 | +5.0 |
| Turnout | | 251,206 | 91.1 | +7.1 |
| AL hold | | | | |

General Election 2001: Magura-1
| Party | Candidate | Votes | % | ±% |
|---|---|---|---|---|
| AL | Muhammad Serajul Akbar | 97,542 | 46.3 | +1.8 |
| BNP | Nitai Roy Chowdhury | 86,468 | 41.1 | +21.4 |
| IJOF | Hasan Siraj Suja | 22,569 | 10.7 | N/A |
| Independent | Majid-ul-Haq | 3,177 | 1.5 | N/A |
| Gano Forum | Muhammad Mizanur Rahman | 525 | 0.3 | N/A |
| WPB | Kazi Nazrul Islam | 236 | 0.1 | N/A |
| Majority | | 11,074 | 5.3 | −9.2 |
| Turnout | | 210,517 | 84.0 | +0.5 |
| AL hold | | | | |

=== Elections in the 1990s ===
General Election June 1996: Magura-1
| Party | Candidate | Votes | % | ±% |
|---|---|---|---|---|
| AL | Muhammad Serajul Akbar | 73,543 | 44.5 | +6.1 |
| JP(E) | Iqbal Akhter Khan | 49,594 | 30.0 | +28.4 |
| BNP | Majid-ul-Haq | 32,621 | 19.7 | −26.6 |
| Jamaat | Liakat Ali Khan | 5,706 | 3.5 | −1.1 |
| Jatiya Samajtantrik Dal-JSD | M. A. Awal | 1,343 | 0.8 | +0.7 |
| NAP (Bhashani) | Md. Amzad Hossain | 836 | 0.5 | N/A |
| Zaker Party | Abul Hasem Moulana | 484 | 0.3 | −4.6 |
| Jatiya Seba Dal | Md. Fazlul Hoque | 365 | 0.2 | N/A |
| IOJ | Md. Shahidul Islam | 303 | 0.2 | N/A |
| JSD | Birendra Nath Mazumder | 298 | 0.2 | 0.0 |
| Independent | Md. Mijanur Rahman | 105 | 0.1 | N/A |
| Majority | | 23,949 | 14.5 | +6.6 |
| Turnout | | 165,198 | 83.5 | +10.9 |
| AL gain from BNP | | | | |

General Election 1991: Magura-1
| Party | Candidate | Votes | % | ±% |
|---|---|---|---|---|
| BNP | Majid-ul-Haq | 69,728 | 46.3 | |
| AL | Altaf Hossain | 57,795 | 38.4 | |
| Zaker Party | A. Haq | 7,659 | 5.1 | |
| Jamaat | Abdul Matin | 6,892 | 4.6 | |
| BAKSAL | Roy Ramesh Chandra | 2,423 | 1.6 | |
| IOJ | Amjad Hossain | 2,421 | 1.6 | |
| JP(E) | Munshi Faizul Kabir | 2,356 | 1.6 | |
| Independent | Hasan Rakib | 775 | 0.5 | |
| Jatiya Samajtantrik Dal-JSD | Mamudur Rahman | 255 | 0.2 | |
| JSD | T. M. Mohabbat Ali | 149 | 0.1 | |
| Majority | | 11,933 | 7.9 | |
| Turnout | | 150,453 | 72.6 | |
| BNP gain from JP(E) | | | | |
