= Shakib Al Hasan =

Bangladeshi cricketer (born 1987)

- সাকিব আল হাসান
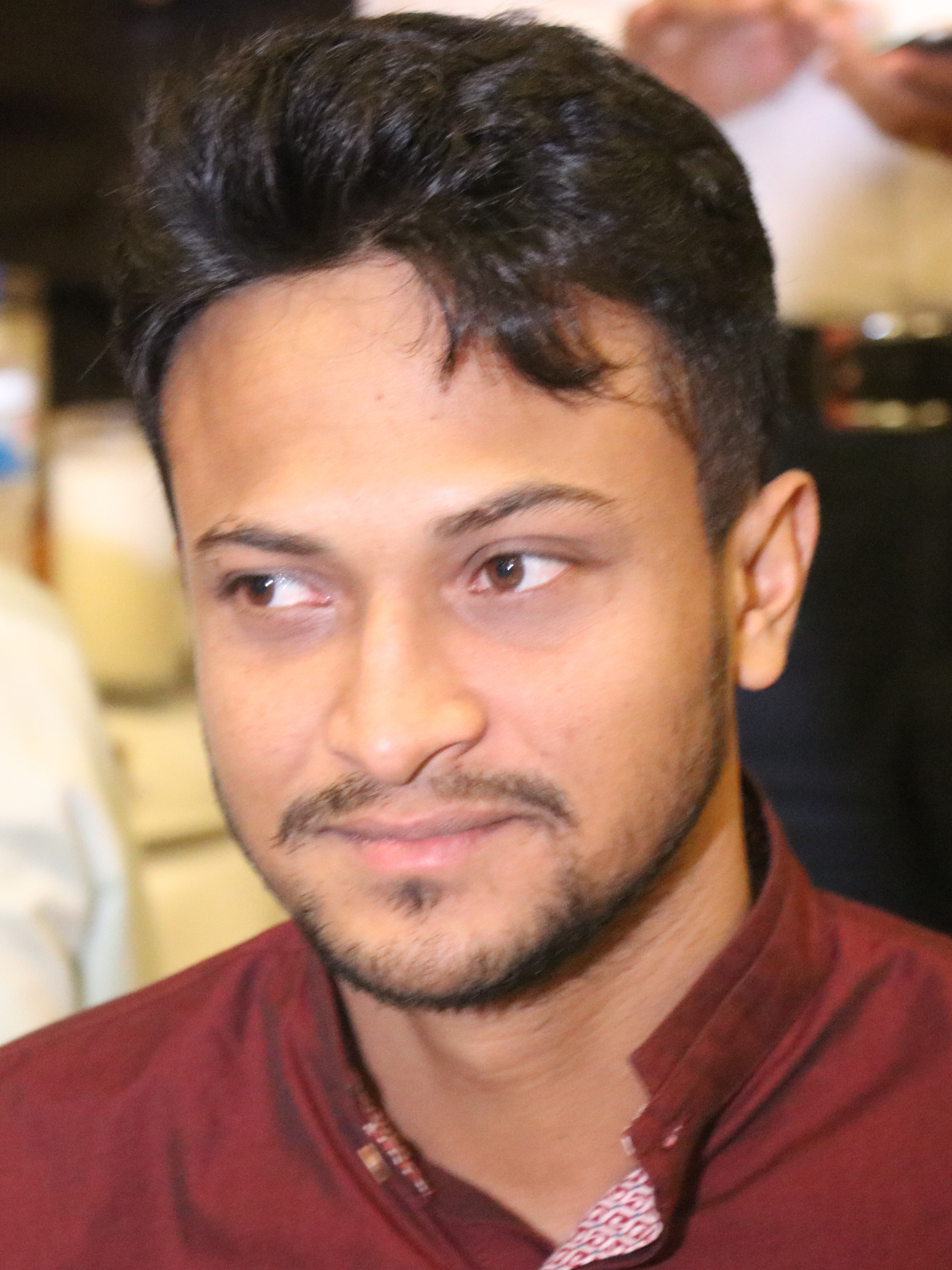
- Shakib in 2023

Member of Parliament
- In office 10 January 2024 – 6 August 2024
- Preceded by: Md. Shifuzzaman
- Succeeded by: Monowar Hossain Khan
- Constituency: Magura-1

Personal details
- Born: Khondaker Sakib Al-Hassan; 24 March 1987 (age 39) Magura, Bangladesh
- Party: Awami League
- Spouse: Ummey Ahmed Shishir (m. 2012)
- Children: 3
- Education: American International University-Bangladesh (BBA)
- Alma mater: Bangladesh Krira Shikkha Protisthan; American International University-Bangladesh
- Occupation: Cricketer, businessman, politician
- Cricket career

Personal information
- Nickname: Faysal
- Height: 1.75 m (5 ft 9 in)
- Batting: Left-handed
- Bowling: Slow left-arm orthodox
- Role: All-rounder

International information
- National side: Bangladesh (2006–2024)
- Test debut (cap 46): 18 May 2007 v India
- Last Test: 1 October 2024 v India
- ODI debut (cap 82): 6 August 2006 v Zimbabwe
- Last ODI: 6 November 2023 v Sri Lanka
- ODI shirt no.: 75
- T20I debut (cap 11): 27 November 2006 v Zimbabwe
- Last T20I: 25 June 2024 v Afghanistan
- T20I shirt no.: 75

Domestic team information
- Years: Team
- 2004–present (Note: Teams that Shakib only played for in one season have been omitted from this list.): Khulna Division
- 2010–2011: Worcestershire
- 2011–2017, 2021: Kolkata Knight Riders
- 2013, 2019: Barbados Tridents
- 2013, 2016–2019: Dhaka Gladiators/Dominators
- 2014, 2022: Legends of Rupganj
- 2015, 2024: Rangpur Riders
- 2016–2017: Jamaica Tallawahs
- 2017, 2023: Peshawar Zalmi
- 2018–2019: Sunrisers Hyderabad
- 2022–2023: Fortune Barishal

Career statistics
| Competition | Test | ODI | T20I | FC |
|---|---|---|---|---|
| Matches | 71 | 247 | 129 | 108 |
| Runs scored | 4,609 | 7,570 | 2,551 | 6,536 |
| Batting average | 37.77 | 37.29 | 23.19 | 36.11 |
| 100s/50s | 5/31 | 9/56 | 0/13 | 8/41 |
| Top score | 217 | 134* | 84 | 217 |
| Balls bowled | 15,675 | 12,575 | 2,745 | 22,205 |
| Wickets | 246 | 317 | 149 | 355 |
| Bowling average | 31.72 | 29.52 | 20.91 | 30.34 |
| 5 wickets in innings | 19 | 4 | 2 | 25 |
| 10 wickets in match | 2 | 0 | 0 | 2 |
| Best bowling | 7/36 | 5/29 | 5/20 | 7/32 |
| Catches/stumpings | 29/– | 60/– | 31/– | 52/– |
Medal record
Men's cricket
Representing Bangladesh
Asia Cup
| Runner-up | 2012 Bangladesh |
| Runner-up | 2016 Bangladesh |
| Runner-up | 2018 UAE |
Asian Games
| Third place | 2014 Incheon |
- Source: ESPNcricinfo, 16 January 2025

Shakib Al Hasan (Bengali: সাকিব আল হাসান, romanized: Sākib āl hāsān; born 24 March 1987) is a Bangladeshi cricketer who has played Test, One Day International ( ODI) and Twenty20 International (T20I) cricket for the Bangladeshi cricket team (Note: Multiple references:), and has captained the side. He served as the member of Parliament for Magura-1 (Note: Multiple references:) after being elected in January 2024. A left-handed middle order batter and slow left-arm orthodox bowler (Note: Multiple references:), he is considered as one of the greatest all-rounders of all time. (Note: Multiple references:) As of 2026, he is the leading wicket-taker in the history of the ICC Men's T20 World Cup.

Shakib made his Test debut against India in 2007. In a Test against New Zealand in Chittagong in 2008, he took 7 wickets for 36 runs, the best figures by a Bangladeshi bowler at that time. He captained Bangladesh to its first Test win over England in 2016. In Tests he has scored over 4,000 runs and taken over 200 wickets. In ODIs he has scored over 6,000 runs and taken more than 270 wickets, and he is the fastest player to complete the double of 5,000 runs and 250 wickets. At the 2012 Asia Cup he scored 237 runs, including three half-centuries, and took six wickets. Bangladesh reached the final for the first time and lost to Pakistan by two runs, and Shakib was named player of the tournament. At the 2019 ICC Cricket World Cup, he scored 606 runs, the third-highest total in the tournament, and broke Sachin Tendulkar’s record for the most runs in a single World Cup group stage.

In T20 franchise cricket, he has played for teams including the Kolkata Knight Riders, Sunrisers Hyderabad, Jamaica Tallawahs and Dhaka Dominators. He won the Indian Premier League twice with Kolkata, in 2012 and 2014, and the Bangladesh Premier League three times with Dhaka Dominators, in 2012, 2013 and 2016. He was named player of the tournament in the BPL a record four times, in 2012, 2013, 2018 and 2022. He has won 41 man-of-the-match awards, the most by a Bangladeshi player, and 16 man-of-the-series awards across all formats. Between 2009 and 2022, he captained Bangladesh in 120 matches across the three formats.

Shakib Al Hasan has been a consistent performer for the Bangladesh cricket team over the years. His career has been filled with controversies over the years, consistently making it to the top of domestic media headlines. He was ranked the 90th most famous athlete in the world by ESPN in 2019. He was included in the ICC Men's Team of the Year twice (2009, 2021).

== Early years and youth cricket ==
Born in Magura District, Khulna Division, Shakib began playing cricket at an early age. According to Prothom Alo sports editor Utpal Shuvro, "Shakib was fairly proficient at cricket and was often hired to play for different villages and teams". In one of those matches, Shakib batted aggressively and bowled fast, as he usually did, but also chose to experiment with spin bowling which proved to be not so effective. He was picked to play for Islampur, and took a wicket with his first ball; it was his first delivery with a proper cricket ball, having previously played with a taped tennis ball. He spent six months training at Bangladesh Krira Shikkha Protishtan, a government-run sports institute.

Shakib played his debut Under-17 match against UAE Under-17s in 2003 in the ACC Under-17 Cup where he recorded bowling figure of 3–18 in 8 overs (with 2 maiden overs).

In May 2004, at the age of 17, Shakib made his first-class debut for Khulna where he got a bowling figure of 0/116 off 30 overs in the 1st innings and 3/92 off 28 overs in the 2nd innings. He also scored 13 off 11 with three 4s in the 1st innings and 16 off 43 in the 2nd innings. His 1st first-class wicket was Rakibul Hasan.

Shakib first represented Bangladesh at the Under-19 level in November 2005 in the 2005 Afro-Asia Under-19 Cup against India Under-19. In his debut match, he scored 24 off 23 balls with four 4s and also achieved a bowling figure of 2/26 in 10 overs with 2 maidens by taking his first wicket of Tanmay Srivastava. In the tournament, Shakib played 5 matches, scoring 138 runs at an average of 38.50 and getting 5 wickets at an average of 25.20. On 30 November 2005, 18-year-old Shakib guided Bangladesh to a four-wicket win over England in the opening match of the tri-nation Under-19 tournament (involving England and Sri Lanka) with his 82 off 62. During the final of a tri-nation tournament, Shakib scored an 86-ball century and took three wickets to lead his team to victory. In his 18 youth One Day Internationals, he has scored 563 runs at an average of 35.18 with three 50s and one 100 and a high score of 100 and took 22 wickets at an average of 20.18 with an economy of 3.68 and a best figure of 4/34.

On 1 January 2005, Shakib made his first-class debut in the match between Bangladesh Cricket Board President's XI and Zimbabweans where he scored 14 off 14 in the 1st innings and 15 off 66 in the 2nd innings. He also got bowling figures of 0/133 in 32 overs. In February 2005, Shakib got his 1st first-class international wicket by dismissing Vusimuzi Sibanda and a five-wicket haul playing against Zimbabwe A.

== Domestic and T20 franchise cricket ==
=== National Cricket League (NCL) ===
Since 2004, Shakib has played for Khulna in the National Cricket League.

In the 2004–05 season of the tournament, Shakib, since his debut in May 2004 at the age of 17, played just 3 matches. (Note: against Rajshahi(13 & 16,0–116 & 3–92),Sylhet(12 & 12,6–75 & 3–49) and Dhaka (54 & 22*, 4-124)) He scored 129 runs at an average of 25.80 with a high score of 54 and took 16 wickets at an average of 27.87 with a best bowling figure of 6/79 in an innings and 9/114 in a match.

In the 2006–07 season, he played just 2 (Note: against Rajshahi(17 & 0-9 in 1st match and 11 & 23 in 2nd match)) matches scoring 51 runs at an average of 17.00 with a high score of 23. He bowled only in 1 innings where he bowled 4 overs of 9 runs with 1 maiden over.

Shakib has played 14 matches scoring 930 runs at an average of 40.43 with three 100s and a high score of 129. He also got 31 wickets at an average of 33.16 with one 5-wicket haul.

=== English County Cricket (ECC) ===
==== County Championship ====
Having signed a contract in November 2009, Shakib joined up with Worcestershire, playing in the second division of the County Championship, in July 2010. He was the first Bangladeshi to represent a county team. Shakib was forced to delay by the BCB for the beginning of his spell as Worcestershire's overseas player. While playing for Worcestershire, he took his best first-class bowling figures of 7/32 against Middlesex. In eight first-class matches, he scored 358 runs at 25.57 (with one score over 50) and took 35 wickets at 22.37, as Worcestershire secured promotion to the first division at the end of the season.

After the 2011 IPL, Shakib returned to Worcestershire for seven weeks. He played a single County Championship match as his time with the team coincided with the 2011 Friends Life t20, but in that match, he took seven wickets and passed 3,000 runs in first-class cricket.

Shakib signed a one-match deal with Surrey for their vital County Championship fixture against Somerset at Taunton. In 1st innings of Somerset, Shakib claimed took 4 wickets of 97 runs.

Shakib played five List-A matches for Worcestershire, scoring 187 at an average of 37.40 (including two half-centuries) and taking 9 wickets at 17.77.

==== FriendsLife t20 ====
Worcestershire finished fifth out of nine teams in their group for the T20 competition, failing to qualify for the quarter-finals. From 12 matches, Shakib took 19 wickets, finishing as the club's leading wicket-taker, equal with seam bowler Gareth Andrew. He also scored 110 runs at an average of 9.16.

Shakib signed for Leicestershire as their second (Note: first being Australian Joe Burns) overseas player for 2013 Friends Life t20 campaign. Shakib played in 10 matches scoring 146 runs at an average of 18.25 with a top score of 43* in the 7-wicket win over Nottinghamshire Outlaws at Trent Bridge. He also got 9 wickets at an average of 27.00 with an economy of 6.50 and a best bowling figure of 2/7 in the 10-wicket win over Yorkshire.

=== Indian Premier League (IPL) ===
Although Shakib was part of the auction of players held the following month for the 2009 Indian Premier League, Shakib was not chosen by any of the eight teams and no bids were made for him despite being rated as the world's highest-ranked ODI all-rounder at the time. His teammate Mashrafe Mortaza, who was bought in the auction by the Kolkata Knight Riders, said "I would have been a lot happier if Shakib had got a team because he truly deserved it for his sensational form with the bat and ball". Shakib had no buyers in the 2010 IPL auction as well, which was very surprising considering his stature in international cricket at the time.

For the 2011 Indian Premier League, Shakib was contracted by Kolkata Knight Riders (KKR) for US$425,000. He made his debut in the tournament on 15 April 2011 in a match against Rajasthan Royals. He claimed two wickets in the match, first that of Amit Paunikar and then Shane Watson, but did not get the chance to bat as his team only lost a wicket, winning by 9 wickets. KKR were knocked out in the semi-finals of the competition; Shakib played in seven matches, taking 11 wickets at an average of 15.90, and finished as KKR's third-highest wicket-taker.

In the 15th Match of the 2012 IPL against Rajasthan Royals, Shakib got a bowling figure of 3–17 which is still his best in his IPL career. KKR won their maiden title in the final against CSK where Shakib contributed with a crucial cameo.

In the 2014 Indian Premier League, Shakib was retained by KKR for a league fee of INR 2.80 crore. In the competition, he scored 227 runs in 11 innings at a strike rate of 149.34; his best being a 60 off 38 balls. He also achieved 11 wickets in 13 matches at an economy of 6.68 and an average of 30.36. His all-round performance was instrumental in KKR's title win. For his performances in 2014, he was named as the 12th man in the Cricinfo IPL XI.

In the 2015 IPL, Shakib played only four matches scoring 36 runs at an average of 12 with 23 being his highest score and picking up four wickets at an average of 30.75 and gave away 8.78 runs per over with his best bowling figures of 2/22 against Mumbai Indians.

"IPL experience helped me improve my game for Bangladesh"

— Shakib Al Hasan

In the 38th match of the 2016 IPL, Shakib combined with Yusuf Pathan put on an unbroken 134 run partnership against the Gujarat Lions, the highest for the fifth wicket in all IPL's. Shakib scored 66*, his best score so far in his IPL career, went in vain as Gujarat Lions won the match by 5 wickets.

"T20 cricket is a challenge for all-rounders"

— Shakib Al Hasan

In the 2017 Indian Premier League, Shakib played his only home match against Gujarat Lions where he scored 1* and returned with bowling figures of 0/31 in that match. He left the tournament midway to play a tri-series in Ireland for the build-up of the 2017 ICC Champions Trophy. Shakib played just 3 matches batting in just 1 inning scoring 1 and achieved 2 wickets at an average of 47.50.

Shakib was released by KKR and was picked up by Sunrisers Hyderabad (SRH) in the 2018 IPL auction. On 24 May 2018, he became the second T20 player to take 300 wickets and score 4,000 runs in the format with the wicket of Rohit Sharma in the SRH's victory against the Mumbai Indians in the 2018 IPL.

Between 2019 Indian Premier League, BCB wanted to call Shakib back for the 2019 ICC Cricket World Cup preparation camp but he skipped the camp for match practice even after playing only 1 match at that time. Shakib was hoped for some IPL matches before World Cup 2019 as Jonny Bairstow and David Warner would leave for their respective World Cup preparation camps.

Shakib was released by the Sunrisers Hyderabad ahead of the 2020 IPL auction after playing for 2 seasons.

Shakib was listed at the highest base price of INR 2 crore for the 2021 IPL auction and was subsequently bought by his former team KKR again for a price of ₹3.2 crore (US$340,000). After the suspension of the 2021 Indian Premier League, Shakib and Mustafizur Rahman returned home on 6 May 2021 via a chartered flight arranged by the BCCI with their respective franchises sharing the cost of the flight. Shakib could not take part in the remainder of IPL because of not getting a no-objection certificate (NOC) from the BCB. In IPL 2023, Shakib Al Hasan got signed by Kolkata Knight Riders for Rs 1.5 crore. But due to international engagements with Bangladesh national cricket team and personal reasons he pulled himself out of IPL 2023.

=== National Cricket League T20 ===
In the 2010 National Cricket League Twenty20 tournament in Bangladesh, a now-defunct Twenty20 league involving the teams in the National Cricket League (NCL), Shakib played as an icon player and captain for the Kings of Khulna.

Shakib played 7 matches where he scored 86 runs at an average of 12.28 and achieved 8 wickets at an average of 20.00 with an economy of 5.92.

=== Dhaka Premier Division Cricket League ===
In September 2009, Shakib joined Abahani along with Mashrafe for TK 20 lakh each.

In November 2010, Shakib joined Mohammedan for Tk 30 lakh.

In the 2014 season, Shakib played for Legends of Rupganj, formerly named Gazi Group Cricketers in the previous season. He played 8 matches scoring 222 runs at an average of 31.71 and also achieving 13 wickets at an average of 23.61.

In the 2016 season, Abahani registered their sixth win in that season by five wickets against Prime Bank where Shakib, who returned to List A cricket for Abahani after a break of 6 years got a bowling figure of 4–35 in 10 overs.

Due to upcoming 2021 T20 World Cup, 2021 season was played in T20 format where he captained the Mohammedan Sporting Club.

In the 2022 season, Shakib switched teams for Super League phase from Mohammedan Sporting to Legends of Rupganj to prepare for the series against Sri Lanka by taking special permission from the league authorities and Mohammedan, since, he could not play for the initial stage and his contracted team did not qualify. In his first match against Prime Bank, he picked 2 wickets in 7 overs and scored 21 off 34. In the match against Gazi Group, Shakib scored 59 off 26 balls and took one wicket. He played only four matches scoring 98 runs at an average of 24.5 and at a strike rate of 103.15 and took 4 wickets with 6 maidens with the economy rate of 3.48.

In the 2023 season, Shakib played for Mohammedan, which was confirmed by Club Committee President AGM Sabbir.

=== Bangladesh Premier League ===
The Bangladesh Cricket Board founded the six-team Bangladesh Premier League in 2012, a twenty20 tournament to be held in February that year. The BCB made Shakib the 'icon player' for Khulna Royal Bengals (KRB). Under his captaincy, Shakib's team progressed to the semi-finals of the competition where they were beaten by Dhaka Gladiators despite Shakib's 86* off 41 balls. In ten matches he scored 280 runs and took 15 wickets, which made him KRB's leading wicket-taker, and was named Man of the Tournament.

In the auction of the BPL 2, Shakib was brought by defending champions Dhaka Gladiators for $365,000, the most expensive player in the tournament. He led his team to the title, getting 329 runs and 15 wickets in 12 matches, emerging as the Man of the Tournament for the consecutive second time in the BPL.

In the BPL 3, Shakib was picked by Rangpur Riders with the 'Players by Choice' system for icon players. In a match against Sylhet Super Stars, Shakib used abusive language towards opposition batsman Dilshan Munaweera as well as on-field umpire Tanvir Ahmed and as a result he got banned for one match after being found guilty. He got 18 wickets in 11 matches at an economy rate of 6.39 in that season.

Shakib was selected in the team of the tournament from BPL 1 to BPL 3.

In the BPL 4, Shakib became the highest paid local player getting at least Tk 5.5 million as a player of A-plus category turning out for Dhaka Dynamites. Shakib became man of the match consecutively two times in the matches against Comilla Victorians (for scoring 41 off 26 balls and achieving a bowling figure of 1/30 in 4 overs and a catch) and Barisal Bulls (for achieving a bowling figure of 4/31 in 4 overs and scoring 22 off 21 balls). Dhaka won the title as Shakib notched his first title win as captain who wanted to win the title this season.

In October 2017, Shakib was named in the squad for the Dhaka Dynamites team, following the draft for the BPL 5. In the 43-run win over Rangpur Riders where Dhaka confirmed second-place in the points table at the end of the group stage, Shakib became man of the match for his all-round performance. Shakib added 55 runs for the sixth wicket with Mehedi Maruf who however departed after scoring 33 off 23 balls with 3 fours and a six but Shakib remained unbeaten on 47 off 33 balls. He also bagged two wickets for just 13 runs from his four overs. In the final of that season, Shakib dropped a catch as he failed to hold on to a chance from Chris Gayle on 22 who went on to break all sorts of records with his unbeaten 69-ball 146, hitting a world record 18 sixes to single-handedly power Rangpur Riders to the title.

In October 2018, Shakib was named in the squad for the Dhaka Dynamites team, following the draft for the BPL 6. On 22 January 2019, Shakib became the first player in BPL's history to take 100 wickets as he achieved the milestone during the match against Comilla Victorians reaching the milestone in his 69th appearance, an average of 16.85 and an economy rate of 6.64. During the tournament, taking the wicket of Comilla Victorians' Anamul Haque during the final of the tournament at Mirpur, Shakib Al Hasan became the highest wicket-taker in a single season of the BPL as he took 23 wickets from 15 matches with an average of 17.65 in that season. Shakib sustained a left ring finger fracture during the match.

In July 2019, Shakib signed a one-year contract with the Rangpur Riders to play for them in BPL 7.

In December 2021, Shakib was signed by Fortune Barishal for 2021-22 Bangladesh Premier League. He led the team to the final, but lost to Comilla Victorians by 1 run in a nail-biting finish. On 24 January 2022, in the league match against Minister Dhaka, he picked up his 400th wicket in Twenty20 cricket. He was awarded 5 consecutive Player of the match award, the most consecutive time by any player in T20. He also received the Player of the tournament award for the 4th time for his allround performances, having scored 284 runs in 11 innings at an average of 28.4 and picking up 16 wickets at an average of 14.56.

For the BPL 10, Shakib was directly signed (brought) by Rangpur Riders for ৳40 crore in the draft, becoming the highest paid player among domestic players of this season.

Shakib is the highest wicket-taker in the BPL with 132 wickets in 100 matches at an average of 18.33 in the Bangladesh Premier League.

=== Sri Lankan Premier League ===
Shakib was expected to play for Uthura Rudras in the inaugural 2012 Sri Lanka Premier League but could not play any match due to suffering a knee injury.

=== Caribbean Premier League ===
In the 2013 Caribbean Premier League, Shakib played for Barbados Tridents. On 3 August 2013 against Trinidad & Tobago Red Steel, Shakib recorded the second best bowling figure in T20 cricket dismissing six batsmen to finish with figures of 6 for 6 from his four overs at Kensington Oval.

Shakib was retained by the same team for The 2014 CPL.

Shakib played for Jamaica Tallawahs in both the 2016 and 2017 season.

Shakib returned to Barbados for the 2018 to 2019 season. Shakib becomes CPL champion with Tridents in the 2019 season, where he scored 111 runs at an average of 18.5 and took only 4 wickets for 150 runs in 6 matches.

In May 2021, Shakib was resigned by Jamaica Tallawahs for the 2021 Caribbean Premier League. He could not participate in the tournament because of not getting a no-objection certificate (NOC) for CPL because of the national duty.

In 2022, Shakib was selected as a replacement player in the Guyana Amazon Warriors squad for the 2022 CPL season.

In 2025, Shakib joined the Antigua and Barbuda Falcons for the 2025 CPL season. In the 11th match of the season against Saint Kints and Mavis, Shakib dismissed Mohammad Rizwan on his 1st over, taking his 500th T20 wicket, becoming the 5th bowler and first left arm off spinner to 500 wickets in T20 cricket history and the first and only cricketer to get the double of 500 wickets and 7,000 runs in T20 cricket history.

Shakib has played 38 matches scoring 448 runs at an average of 16.59 and strike rate of 109.54 and getting 39 wickets at an economy of 6.83, including 11 catches in the CPL.

=== Big Bash League ===
Shakib joined for Adelaide Strikers in 2014 replacing the injured Johan Botha, thus becoming the first Bangladeshi to play in the Big Bash League. In his debut match at the 2013–14 Big Bash League season, Shakib scored 41 runs off 29 balls and took 2 wickets for 21 runs in his 4 overs for Adelaide Strikers, although being unable to prevent his team from losing.

On 24 December 2014, it was announced that Shakib would be joining the Melbourne Renegades for the final 4 games of the 2014–15 Big Bash League season, replacing Andre Russell, who would be leaving to join the West Indies in their tour of South Africa.

In November 2020, Cricket Australia announced that Shakib would not be able to play in future in BBL due to objections from the CA ethical police as part of its zero tolerance against corruption in cricket.

Shakib played 6 matches scoring 87 runs at an average of 14.50 and strike rate of 117.57 and taking 9 wickets at an economy of 6.10.

=== Pakistan Super League (PSL) ===
Shakib was one of the headline stars confirmed by the PCB's commitment at the unveiling its preliminary plans for the Pakistan Super League.

In the 2016 Pakistan Super League, Shakib was named one of the Platinum Players and later he was picked up by Karachi Kings for US$140,000. In his debut match against Lahore Qalanders, he was adjudged man of the match for scoring 51 out of 35 balls and getting a bowling figure of 1/26 which helped his team win by 7 wickets.

In the 2017 season, Shakib was picked by Peshawar Zalmi. He was supposed to play for the 2018 season also but was injured at that time.

Shakib had a chance to play in the middle of PSL 2020 as a replacement of Mahmudullah Riyad, who tested positive of COVID-19 recently. But, he was not allowed to take part for not being part of the draft list from the beginning.

In April 2021, Shakib was signed by Lahore Qalandars to play in the rescheduled matches in the 2021 Pakistan Super League. But later, in May 2021, he expressed his desire to play in the 2021 Dhaka Premier League instead of playing in the rescheduled matches of the 2021 Pakistan Super League. As a result, he missed the rescheduled matches of the 2021 Pakistan Super League.

Shakib played 13 matches scoring 180 runs at an average of 16.36 and strike rate of 107.14 and getting 8 wickets at an economy of 7.39.

=== Global T20 Canada ===
In June 2019, Shakib was selected to play for the Brampton Wolves in the 2019 Global T20 Canada, but missed as the BCB granted his request to give him some time off from the cricket.

=== Lanka Premier League ===
Shakib was expected to play in 2020 Lanka Premier League as his ban was expected to end in October but BCB declared that no Bangladeshi players, including Shakib, would feature in the LPL.

Shakib, expected to play the 2021 season, was again granted no NOC as BCB declared no Bangladeshi players will feature in the LPL 2021.

Shakib signed up with Gall Marvels for the 2023 season. Shakib produced an all-round display for massive 83-run victory over B-Love Kandy with a quickfire 21-ball 30 to help his team to reach 180-5 and 2-10 off 3 overs to help bundle out B-Love Kandy to 97 in 17.1 overs.

=== Bangabandu T20 Cup ===
In November 2020, Shakib made a return to cricket, following the completion of a one-year ban imposed by the International Cricket Council, being selected to play for Gemcon Khulna in Bangabandhu T20 Cup 2020.

Shakib became the third cricketer to achieve the rare double of 5000 runs and 300 wickets (in 311 games) in T20 cricket in the match against Gazi Group Chattogram in the tournament. Shakib however is the 2nd Bangladeshi batsman to score 5000 runs in T20 cricket after Tamim Iqbal. Overall he is the 65th cricketer in the world to reach the 5000 runs mark.

Shakib was not available in the final of the tournament due to seeing his ailing father-in-law in the US. Before leaving, he made a quickfire 28 and took one wicket conceding 31 runs in Khulna's crucial win against Gazi Group Chattogram in the 1st Qualifier of the tournament.

Shakib played nine matches, failing to impress much by scoring only 110 runs and bagging 6 wickets.

=== Bangladesh Cricket League (BCL) ===
Shakib Al Hasan made his return to cricket with the opening match of 2022 Independence Cup, named changed by BCB. He was picked by Walton Central Zone. Shakib scored 35 off 58 with two fours and then followed it up with 2-24 including two maidens to script the victory by 22-run against Islami Bank East Zone at Sylhet International Cricket Stadium.

== International career ==
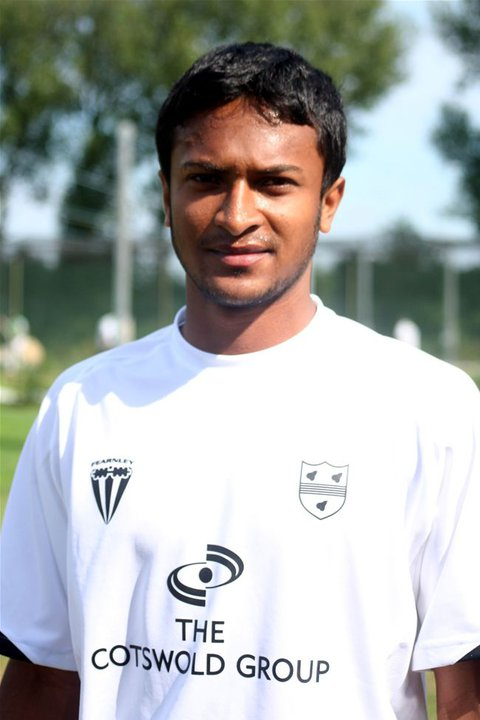
Hasan in 2010.

=== Debut years ===
Shakib made his One Day International (ODI) debut against Zimbabwe on 6 August 2006 at Harare Sports Club. He played a significant part in Bangladesh's victory, where he scored 30 runs and bowled out Elton Chigumbura to get his first ODI wicket.

On 28 November 2006, Shakib made his T20 and T20I debut against Zimbabwe. On his debut, Shakib scored 26 off 28 balls and got a bowling figure of 1/31.His 1st T20 & T20I wicket was of Sean Williams.

Shakib made his Test debut on 6 May 2007 against India. On his debut, he got a bowling figure of 0/62 (19 overs) and scored 30 off 47 balls in 1st innings and 15 off 64 balls in 2nd innings. Shakib's first test wicket was Craig Cumming in the 2nd test vs New Zealand.

On 20 October 2008, Shakib took at that time the best bowling figures by a Bangladesh player in Tests, 7 wickets for 36 runs, against New Zealand in the 1st test of the test series.

From January 2009 to April 2011 and again from March 2012 to January 2013, Shakib was ranked first amongst ODI all-rounders by the ICC. In December 2011, he became the world's top-ranked Test all-rounder. In December 2014, Shakib became the world's top-ranked Twenty 20 all-rounder. He is currently the only all-rounder to be ranked in the top 3 of ICC Player Rankings across every format of international cricket.

Shakib was appointed Bangladesh's vice-captain in June 2009. During Bangladesh's tour of the West Indies the following month, the captain Mashrafe Mortaza was injured and Shakib took over the captaincy. He was 22 years old at the time. Initially, a temporary position, Shakib's success against the West Indies, securing his team's first overseas series win, ensured his retention of captaincy even after Mashrafe recovered. Shakib was named The Wisden Cricketer's "Test Player of the Year" in October 2009. In July 2010, he stepped down from the ODI captaincy to concentrate on his personal performance. Mortaza took over until he became injured again and Shakib was asked to resume leadership. This lasted until he was relieved of captaincy in September 2011 due to a poor World Cup campaign.

=== Breakthrough (2006–2008) ===
Shakib was included in Bangladesh's senior squad to tour Zimbabwe in February 2006. Along with Farhad Reza and Mushfiqur Rahim, Shakib was one of the three uncapped players to be included in the squad. Shakib and Reza were described as "very good cricketers in all departments of the game", and Faruq Ahmed – the chief selector – said that Bangladesh had "high hopes from them and it's time for them to perform at the international level". Shakib made his ODI debut on the tour on 6 August; his maiden wicket was that of all-rounder Elton Chigumbura, and he finished with bowling figures of 1/39. He also scored 30 not out while Shahriar Nafees scored his maiden ODI century to help Bangladesh win by eight wickets. It was the final match in the series, which Zimbabwe won 3–2. In September 2006, Shakib was one of three players to be granted a rookie contract with the Bangladesh Cricket Board (BCB), along with Farhad Reza and Mehrab Hossain Jr. This increased the number of players with central contracts and under the control of the BCB from 20 to 23.

Shakib was included in the 15-man squad led by Habibul Bashar for the 2007 Cricket World Cup hosted West Indies in March and April. Bangladesh made it to the second stage of the competition and finished seventh. Along the way the team caused an upset by beating India to help knock them out of the tournament. With Tamim Iqbal in just his fifth ODI and Mushfiqur Rahim, Shakib was one of three Bangladesh batsmen in the match to score a half century to help the team reach its target of 192 to win. Later in the tournament, Shakib scored another half-century although Bangladesh were defeated by England on that very occasion. He scored 202 runs from 9 matches at an average of 28.85 with a high score of 57* and achieved 7 wickets at an average of 43.14 with an economy of 4.96.

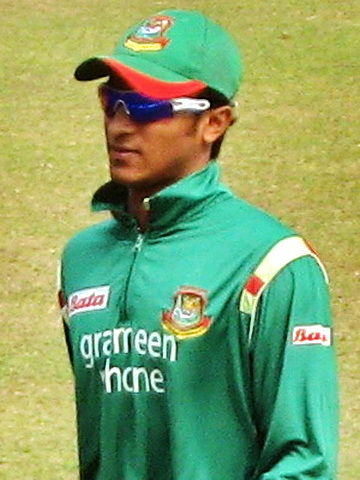
Shakib in the 3rd and the final ODI against Zimbabwe in January 2009 in Sher-e-Bangla National Stadium, which Bangladesh won with Shakib's individual unbeaten 33 runs off 60 balls

Later that year, in May, India toured Bangladesh for two Tests and three ODIs. On 18 May, Shakib made his Test debut against India. He batted once, scoring 27 runs, and bowled 13 overs without taking a wicket as the match ended in a draw. In his 2nd match he batted twice scoring 30 and 15 runs and bowled 19 overs without taking any wickets where also wicket-kept for 8 balls till India's innings declaration, as India won by an innings and 238 runs. India won the Test series 1–0 and the ODI series 3–0. After the tour, Dav Whatmore resigned from his position as Bangladesh coach, and batsman Mohammad Ashraful replaced Habibul Bashar as captain.

In September 2007, South Africa hosted the ICC World Twenty20. Victory against West Indies in the first round was enough to ensure Bangladesh's progression to the second round, although it was the only one of their five matches they won. In the match against West Indies, Shakib took 4/34; it was the first time a Bangladesh player had taken more than three wickets in an International Twenty20 match (T20I). Shakib was part of another piece of T20I history when in a match against Australia in the tournament he became one of three victims of the first T20I hat-trick. Brett Lee took Shakib's wicket, followed by those of Mortaza's and Alok Kapali to help Australia to a nine-wicket win. In October that year, it was announced that Jamie Siddons – Australia's assistant coach – would take over the role of Bangladesh coach; Siddons asserted that the previous set-up had focused on short-term goals and that he was planning to improve Bangladesh over the long term and keep together a core squad of talented players to gain experience at international level.

In December 2007 and January 2008, Bangladesh toured New Zealand for two Tests and three ODIs. Although he did not play the first Test, Shakib was selected over Enamul Haque Jr for the second due to his better batting ability. It was Shakib's fourth Test, and until that point he had gone wicketless. His first wicket was that of New Zealand's Craig Cumming. New Zealand won by an innings and 137 runs and took the series 2–0. New Zealand also completed a clean sweep in the ODIs which preceded the Tests, winning 3–0. Shakib played in all three ODIs scoring 31 runs at an average of 10.33, and taking 3 wickets at an average of 42.33. Over February and March 2008 South Africa toured Bangladesh, playing two Tests and three ODIs. South Africa won both Tests. Shakib played in both Bangladesh's defeats, taking just one wicket while conceding 122 runs, and scoring 75 runs. South Africa won the subsequent ODI series 3–0. Shakib passed 1,000 ODI runs in the series; he passed the landmark in his 39th ODI with a batting average of 35.37.

Before New Zealand's tour of Bangladesh in October 2008, Shakib was considered more of a batsman than a bowler, despite being an all-rounder. Though he usually batted down the order at number seven in Tests, he had mostly batted in the top five in ODIs. In a departure from Shakib's usual role Jamie Siddons, the coach stated that Shakib would play the Test series against New Zealand as a specialist bowler. The move immediately paid off, and he took 7/37 in New Zealand's first innings in the opening Test which were the best bowling figures by a Bangladesh player in all their 54 Tests suppressing the previous best innings figures by a Bangladeshi bowler set by another left-armer Enamul Haque with 7–95 against Zimbabwe at Dhaka three years ago., He scored 71 for his maiden Test half-century to guide the home team to 184–8 in their second innings. Bangladesh lost the series 2–0, but Shakib finished as Bangladesh's leading wicket-taker in the series with 10 wickets at 17.80. His spell was nominated to be the Best Test Bowling Performance of 2008 by ESPNcricinfo. Bangladesh won the opening match of the ODI series against New Zealand – securing their first ever ODI win over them – although they eventually lost the series 2–1. Shakib finished with five wickets from three matches, making him Bangladesh's second-highest wicket-taker for the series behind Mashrafe Mortaza (7); however Shakib scored just 16 runs in the series.

The following month, Bangladesh toured South Africa for two Tests, three ODIs, and a T20I. While Bangladesh lost all their matches against South Africa except for an abandoned ODI, Shakib continued to build on the good bowling form he had found against New Zealand. On the first day of the opening Test, Shakib went wicketless; on the advice of Mohammad Salauddin, Bangladesh's assistant coach, he gave the ball flight on the second day and went on to take five wickets. He took another five-wicket haul in the second Test, again as Bangladesh lost to South Africa. Along with South Africa's Makhaya Ntini, Shakib was the series' leading wicket-taker with 11 at an average of 20.81. Shakib's performance against South Africa in a losing cause prompted former Australian leg spin bowler Kerry O'Keeffe to describe him as the "world's best finger spinner at the moment". Sri Lanka toured Bangladesh in December 2008 and January 2009 for two Tests and a Tri-nation tournament including Zimbabwe. Sri Lanka won both Tests and the tournament final, although Shakib turned in a man of the match performance, scoring 92 not out, in the second ODI against Sri Lanka helped Bangladesh to their only victory against them on the tour. In the first match of the Test series, Shakib took another five-wicket haul as his team again was defeated.

On 22 January 2009, Shakib was ranked first amongst ODI all-rounders by the ICC.

=== Captaincy and vice-captaincy (2009–2011) ===
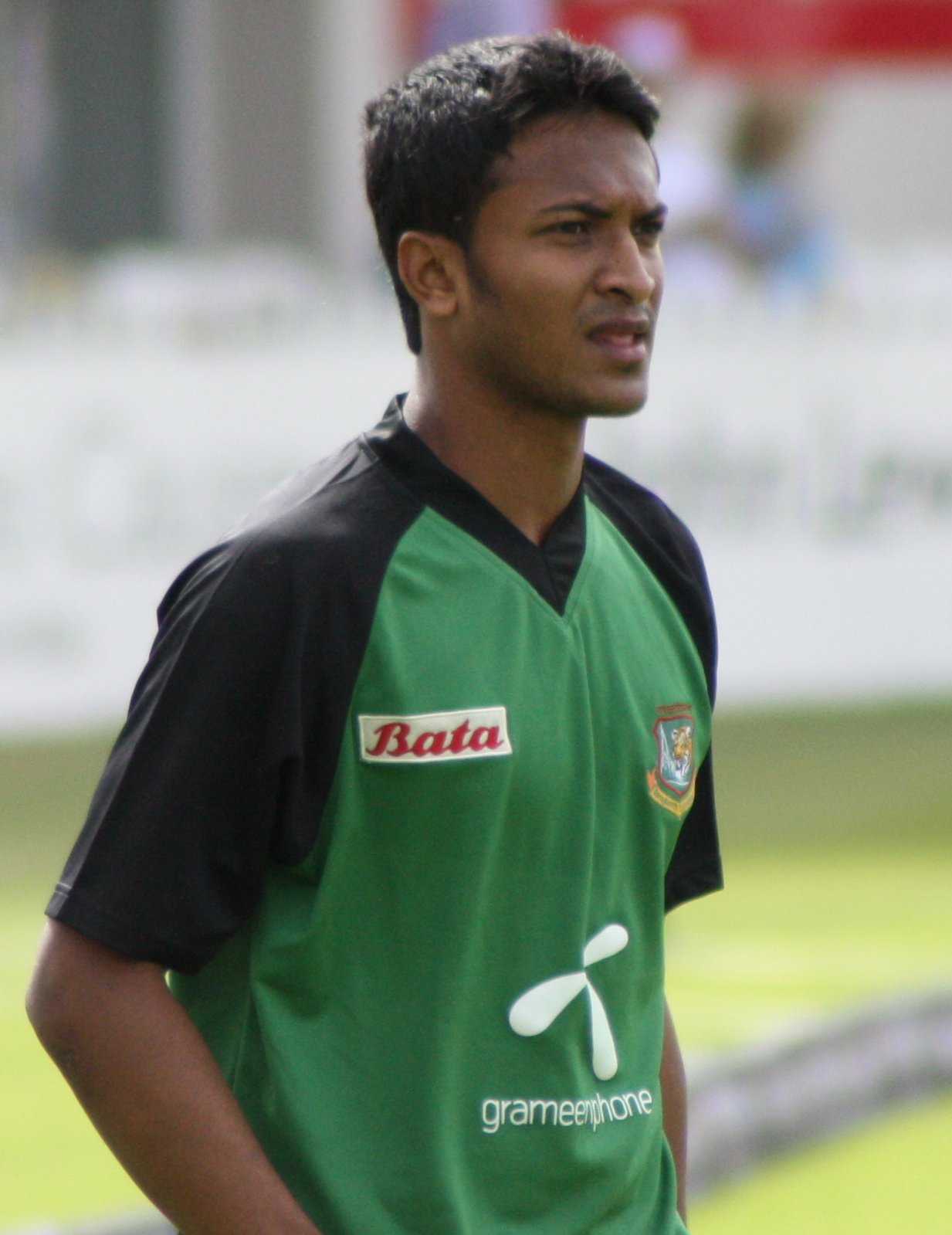
Shakib was appointed Bangladesh's vice-captain in June 2009.

At the beginning of 2009, there was speculation over Mohammad Ashraful and his position as captain after a succession of defeats for Bangladesh and continuous poor form for Ashraful. Shakib was considered a possible successor by the Bangladesh Cricket Board (BCB). However, the BCB was cautious of over-burdening the all-rounder and decided against the move. Other candidates were discounted, and Ashraful remained as captain. Later in 2009, Ashraful's captaincy was again under scrutiny after Bangladesh exited the 2009 ICC World Twenty20 in the first round following losses to Ireland and India. When Mashrafe Mortaza replaced Mohammad Ashraful in June 2009, Shakib was appointed vice-captain, filling the position vacated by Mortaza.

==== West Indies ====
In July–August 2009, Bangladesh toured the West Indies. When Mortaza injured his knee in the first Test, he was unable to take to the field on the final day and Shakib took over as captain. He and Mahmudullah led Bangladesh's bowling attack, sharing 13 wickets in the match and securing a historic win for Bangladesh. It was Bangladesh's first against the West Indies, their first overseas Test victory, and only their second Test win. The West Indies team was very inexperienced due to the fallout of a dispute between the West Indies Cricket Board and the West Indies Players' Association over pay. The first XI had made themselves unavailable for selection and a new squad had to be chosen. Seven West Indies players made their Test debut in the match and the team was captained by Floyd Reifer who had played the last of his four Tests ten years earlier. Shakib was fined 10% of his match fee for excessive appealing; bowler Shahadat Hossain was also fined and batsman Imrul Kayes was reprimanded for the same reason.

In Mortaza's absence through injury, Shakib led Bangladesh for the remainder of the tour. Aged 22 years and 115 days at the start of the second Test, Shakib became Bangladesh's youngest captain and fifth youngest in the history of Test cricket. Under Shakib's leadership Bangladesh went on to win the second Test, and in the process secured their first overseas series win. Individually Shakib performed well, earning both the player-of-the-match and player-of-the-series awards, scoring 16 and 96 not out with the bat and taking 3/59 and 5/70 with the ball. He scored 159 runs in the series at an average of 53.00 and was Bangladesh's second highest run-scorer for the series; his haul of 13 wickets at an average of 18.76 from both matches meant Shakib was the equal highest wicket-taker for the series along with West Indies fast bowler Kemar Roach. After winning the Test series 2–0, Bangladesh proceeded to whitewash the ODI series, winning 3–0. The West Indies' dispute remained unsolved for the whole of Bangladesh's tour and the West Indies continued to field an inexperienced team. Shakib collected two half centuries in the ODI series, averaging 45.00, and was the third highest run-scorer in the series; he also took 2 wickets at an average of 48.00. For his performance in the ODIs, Shakib was named the man of the series. Brian Lara on his Facebook page quoted him becoming 'the man for all seasons' for Bangladesh after the conclusion of 1st ODI during the tour.

==== Zimbabwe ====
Shakib was appointed captain for Bangladesh's tour of Zimbabwe in August 2009 as Mortaza was still injured. In the second ODI of the five-match series in Zimbabwe in August 2009, Shakib scored 104 off only 64 balls before being run-out – his third ODI century – to help his team to their highest score in ODIs and lead Bangladesh to a 2–0 lead in the series. He finished the series with 170 runs from five matches at an average of 42.50 – fifth highest run-scorer – and 6 wickets an average of 39.66, fourth highest wicket-taker in the series. Following his team's 4–1 victory in the ODI series against Zimbabwe, Shakib travelled to Australia to undergo medical treatment for acute groin pain. He had been experiencing pain since the end of the West Indies tour, but he had decided to play through the pain and lead Bangladesh in Zimbabwe. Although he did not win, Shakib was nominated Cricketer of the Year and Test Player of the Year in the 2009 ICC Awards; he was the only Bangladesh player to be nominated in either category that year.

Shakib's success meant that it was not a given that Mortaza would replace him as captain once fit, but it was announced in September 2009 that Mortaza would return as captain for Bangladesh's home ODI series against Zimbabwe the following month and Shakib would return to the role of vice-captain. However, Mortaza failed to return from arthroscopic surgery on both knees in time for the series, and Shakib was again named captain. After losing the opening match – in which Shakib criticised the performance of Bangladesh's batsmen including himself – Bangladesh went on to win the series 4–1. In the second match of the series, Shakib passed 2,000 runs in ODIs.

On 5 November 2009, Shakib became no. 1 ODI bowler in ICC rankings.

In November 2009, Shakib was named The Wisden Cricketer's "Test Player of the Year".

==== England and the Asia Cup ====
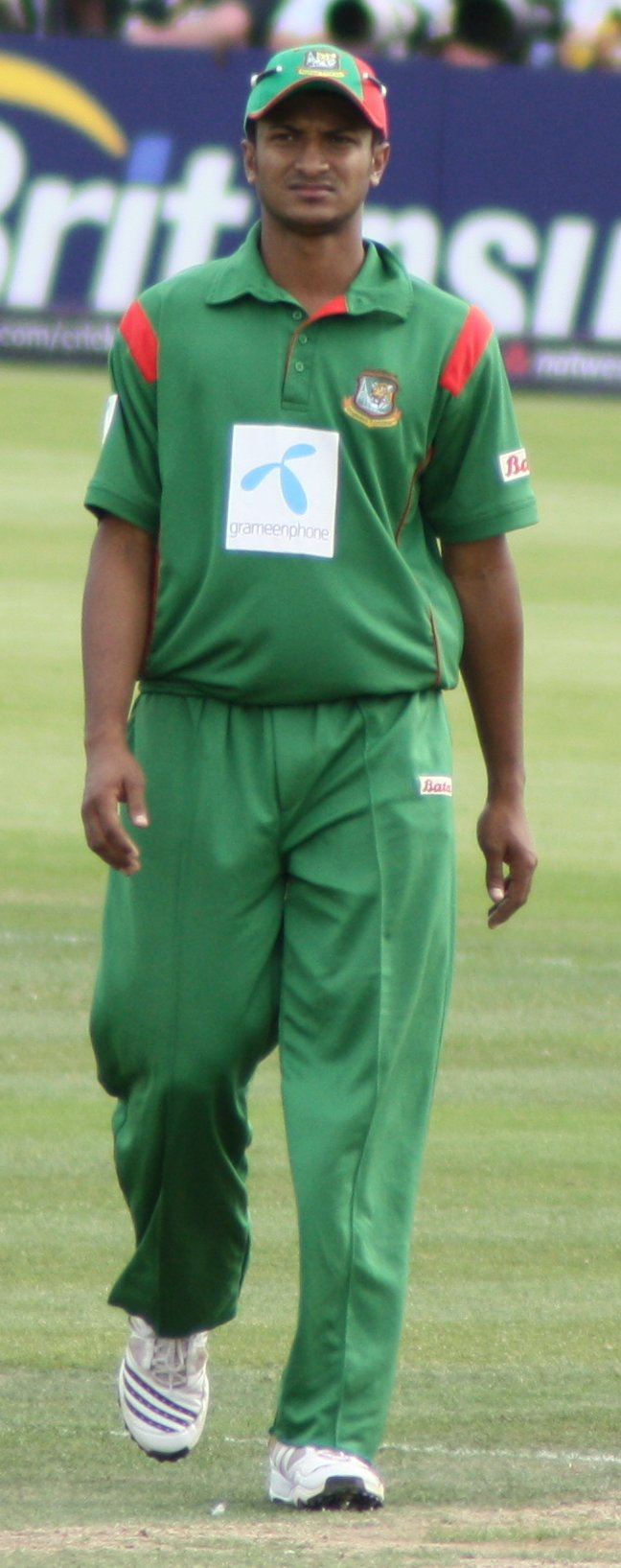
Shakib in the field against England during the second ODI, shortly after relinquishing the captaincy

Over February and March 2010 England toured Bangladesh for two Tests and three ODIs. England won all of their matches against Bangladesh. Shakib was Bangladesh's leading wicket-taker in both the Test and ODI series (9 in Tests and 5 in ODIs). Both Tests went to the final day and Shakib expressed the opinion that the experience had exhausted his team. The match was also a source of controversy after incorrect umpiring decisions on the third day went against Bangladesh, prompting Shakib to blame the lack of a referral system for some of the team's misfortune. In turn, Bangladesh toured England in May and July the same year. They again lost the Test series 2–0. Shakib finished as his team's leading wicket-taker with eight wickets, although he only scored 52 runs. Before the ODI series, Bangladesh left England for Sri Lanka, which was hosting the 2010 Asia Cup in June. Bangladesh lost all three of their matches. With five wickets, Shakib was Bangladesh's leading wicket-taker with Shafiul Islam (5 each).

As he was struggling to cope with the captaincy and his role as an all-rounder, Shakib gave up the captaincy in July 2010 to focus on his own performance. Mashrafe Mortaza returned to take charge in ODIs. Coach Jamie Siddons explained that "Shakib was the main person behind the decision, he decided it was a bit much for him. His form was down with the bat and he needed a rest." Bangladesh returned to England for the ODI half of their tour. Bangladesh lost the series 2–1, but their victory in the second match was the first time Bangladesh had beaten England in international cricket. While in Europe, Bangladesh were scheduled to play two ODIs against Ireland, and one each against Scotland and Netherlands. The match against Scotland was abandoned and Bangladesh lost one match to each of Ireland and the Netherlands.

For his performances in 2009, he was named in the World Test XI by the ICC.

==== New Zealand and Zimbabwe ====
In October 2010, New Zealand went to Bangladesh for five ODIs. In the first match of the series Mortaza injured his ankle and was forced to leave the field; Shakib took over, and under his leadership, Bangladesh secured a nine-run victory, during which Shakib took four wickets and scored 58. Once it emerged that Mortaza would be unable to play in the rest of the series, Shakib was made captain for the remaining matches. In the fourth match, Shakib scored a century and took three wickets to help his team win by nine runs. Bangladesh went on to win the series 4–0, their first series victory against a full strength ICC Full Member nation. Shakib finished the series as the player with most runs and wickets on either team: 213 runs and 11 wickets.

Although Mortaza returned from injury in time for Zimbabwe's tour of Bangladesh in December, Shakib was retained as captain for the five-match ODI series. Following his team's defeat in the opening ODI, Shakib stated that he "was not prepared to take the job and I am also not satisfied with my role as a captain". Bangladesh went on to win the next three complete matches, with one called off due to rain, to beat Zimbabwe 3–1. Shakib was Bangladesh's second-highest run-scorer and wicket taker for the series with 156 runs, including two half centuries, and nine wickets.

==== 2011 World Cup ====
In February to April 2011, Bangladesh co-hosted the World Cup with India and Sri Lanka. West Indies dismissed Bangladesh for 58 runs, the team's lowest score in ODIs and a record low for a Full Member at the World Cup. Shakib described this match as the 'worst day' of his career. Shakib's house was stoned by angry fans in the aftermath, as was the West Indies team bus as it left the ground. Bangladesh registered wins against England, Ireland, and the Netherlands, but defeats by West Indies, India, and South Africa meant they did not progress beyond the first round of the tournament. With 8 wickets at an average of 27.87, Shakib was Bangladesh's leading wicket-taker in the tournament, and his 142 runs from 6 innings made him the team's third highest run-scorer.

=== After World Cup ===
Shortly after the World Cup, Australia toured Bangladesh for three ODIs. In the first match of the series, Shakib scored 51 to pass 3,000 runs in ODIs. Bangladesh lost the series 3–0, Shakib scored 69 runs in three matches and took just one wicket whilst conceding 117 runs. Shane Watson's performances in the series meant he was ranked first amongst ODI all-rounders, claiming the position from Shakib.

When Bangladesh toured Zimbabwe in August 2011 they were expected to win the one-off Test, which was Zimbabwe's first in five years, and the five-match ODI series. As it transpired Bangladesh lost the ODI series 3–2 and the Test. Shakib and his vice-captain Tamim Iqbal were sacked, with a BCB official citing unsatisfactory leadership.

=== Post-captaincy (2011–2017) ===
Bangladesh's first series under new leadership was against the West Indies in October 2011. Relieved of the captaincy, Shakib was Bangladesh's leading wicket-taker in both the ODI and Test series, his bowling was backed up by 168 runs in the two Tests (of the Bangladesh players, only Tamim Iqbal scored more), and 79 from two innings in the ODIs. Bangladesh lost both series. Following this, Shakib was Bangladesh's top run-scorer and wicket-taker in the home Test series against Pakistan in December 2011. In the second Test of the series, he became Bangladesh's first player to score a century (his highest score, 144) and take five wickets in an innings in the same Test. After the series he moved to first place in the ICC's ranking of Test all-rounders.

In the home series against West Indies in late 2012, he became the 2nd Bangladeshi to both take 100 Test wickets, making him the leading wicket-taker in Tests for Bangladesh, and to complete the 1000 run / 100 wicket double. However, he got ruled out of the ODI and T20 series due to a shin injury.

Shakib got ruled out of the Sri Lanka tour in March due to a calf muscle injury. He had a successful operation on the right leg at a private hospital in Sydney. He would be on rest for one month since his operation.

In 2nd Test match of Zimbabwe tour of Bangladesh 2014 Shakib became only the fourth player in Test history after Alan Davidson (1960), Ian Botham (1980) and Imran Khan (1983) to score a hundred and take 10 wickets in the same match.

On 7 December 2014, Shakib became no. 1 T20 all-rounder.

In 2015, Shakib helped Bangladesh to their most successful year in cricket. Following their success in the 2015 Cricket World Cup (where after batting in the first match at the 2015 Cricket World Cup, he had a total of 4,040 runs in ODI matches and became the first Bangladeshi cricketer to score 4,000 runs in ODIs), he also helped the team to a whitewash of Pakistan and series win against India and South Africa. On 12 June, he captured his 100th Test wicket at home on the third day of the one-off Test match against India. On 15 July, he took his 200th wicket of his ODI career by taking the wicket of Hashim Amla in the final ODI of the ODI series becoming the fastest, youngest and the only seventh cricketer to 4,000 runs and 200 wickets double in ODIs (in 156 matches). (Note: other cricketers are Sanath Jayasuriya (235 matches), Shahid Afridi (238 matches), Jacques Kallis (221 matches), Abdul Razzaq (204 matches), Chris Harris (244 matches) and Chris Cairns (213 matches))

On 26 September 2016, with the wicket of Shabir Noori during the first ODI against Afghanistan, Shakib became Bangladesh's leading wicket-taker in ODIs as well as in all formats at that time.

On 22 October 2016, with the wicket of Joe Root, Shakib became the first Bangladeshi to have bagged 150 Test scalps.

=== New era of Test & T20I captaincy (2017–2019) ===
After the retirement from T20I of Mashrafe Mortaza in 2017, Shakib was appointed as the T20I captain of the team for the second time. Later Mushfiqur Rahim was also removed from Test captaincy and Hasan was again appointed as Test captain. However, during 2017–18 Bangladesh Tri-Nation Series, he injured his finger and was rested for few days. In his absence, Mahmudullah captained the team in the Home series against Sri Lanka and 2018 Nidahas Trophy. His first tour was against Pakistan in July 2017.

On 28 August 2017, Al Hasan became the 4th bowler in Test history to record a 5-wicket haul against all Test Playing nations (except Afghanistan and Ireland, who were only granted Test status earlier that year) when he grabbed 5 wickets against Australia in his first encounter with the team. He also scored a half-century in the first innings. In the second innings, he only scored 8 runs with the bat, but he grabbed another 5 wickets to secure his first 10-wicket haul and the win. However, after the series, Al Hasan opted to take a break from Test to focus on limited-overs games.

In April 2018, he was one of ten cricketers to be awarded a central contract by the Bangladesh Cricket Board (BCB) ahead of the 2018 season. Later the same month, he was named in the Rest of the World XI squad for the one-off T20I against the West Indies, played at Lord's on 31 May 2018, but later withdrew from the squad due to personal reason.

In November 2018, in the series against the West Indies, he became the first bowler for Bangladesh to take 200 wickets in Tests. In the same match, he also became the fastest cricketer, in terms of matches, to score 3,000 runs and take 200 wickets in Tests, doing so in his 54th match.

=== 2019 Cricket World Cup ===
In April 2019, he was named as the vice-captain of Bangladesh's squad for the 2019 Cricket World Cup. In the first innings of Bangladesh's opening match in the World Cup, against South Africa, he and Mushfiqur Rahim scored 142 runs for the third wicket, the highest partnership for any wicket for Bangladesh in a World Cup match. Bangladesh went on to score their then highest total in an ODI match at that time, finishing on 330/6 from their 50 overs. In the second innings, he took the wicket of Aiden Markram as his 250th wicket in ODIs, to become the fastest cricketer to take 250 wickets and score 5,000 runs in ODIs, in terms of a number of matches (199). Bangladesh went on to win the match by 21 runs with Shakib named as player of the match. In that match he also became the first cricketer to score a fifty in the first match of Bangladesh in each World Cup since 2007.

In Bangladesh's next match in the tournament, against New Zealand, Shakib played in his 200th ODI. On 17 June 2019, in the match against the West Indies, Shakib became the second batsman for Bangladesh to score 6,000 runs in ODIs. For his unbeaten 124, he was awarded man of the match.

In the match against Australia, Shakib Al Hasan got out for 41 which was his first score of under fifty runs in this World Cup. He also missed out on becoming the first Bangladeshi player to score 6 consecutive 50+ scores in ODIs being now joint with Tamim Iqbal who had 5 50+ scores in 2012. In the second innings, Bangladesh went on to score their then highest total in an ODI match in a losing cause, finishing on 333/8 in 50 overs.

On 24 June 2019, in the match against Afghanistan, where he was again named man of the match, Shakib became the first batsman for Bangladesh to score 1,000 runs in the Cricket World Cup, and the first bowler for Bangladesh to take a five-wicket haul in a World Cup match. He also became the second cricketer, after Yuvraj Singh, to score 50 runs and take five wickets in the same match at a World Cup.

On 2 July 2019, in the match against India, Shakib became the first cricketer in the World Cup to score 600 runs and take 10 wickets in a single tournament. He finished the tournament as the leading run-scorer for Bangladesh, with 606 runs in eight matches and surpassed Sachin Tendulkar's record for the most runs in the group stage of a World Cup. Shakib had a mind blowing average of 86.57 with the bat in the World Cup. He appeared in 8 matches in the World Cup and took 11 wickets. He was named in the 'Team of the Tournament' by the ICC and ESPNcricinfo.

=== Post 2019 World Cup to 2020 ===
In September 2019, during the 2019–20 Bangladesh Tri-Nation Series, Shakib took his 350th wicket in international cricket, in the final group match against Afghanistan.

Between 1 September 2011 and 28 December 2020, Shakib played 131 matches scoring 2,011 runs at an average of 50.27 with 4 hundreds and also taking 97 wickets at an average of 22.63 with two 5-wicket hauls in ODIs. Thus he was named in the ICC Men's ODI team of the Decade.

=== 2021–2022 ===
After serving a one-year ban, he returned to the national squad for their Test and ODI series against West Indies. In the first ODI, he picked up his 150th wicket at home. Shakib also set another record as the left-arm spinner became the first Bangladeshi cricketer to bowl in 100 innings on home. In the third ODI, he became the only cricketer to register the double of 6,000 runs and 300 wickets across all formats in a single country. Bangladesh went on to win the three-match series by 3–0 and he became the Player of the Series by scoring 113 runs and picking up 6 wickets at an average of 8.33.

In the third ODI, Shakib suffered a groin injury. However, he recovered from the injury and thus he was selected in the squad of the Test series. But in the first test, he suffered an injury in another region of the same thigh that forced him to leave the field late in the second day. It seemed that Shakib's old groin injury had resurfaced but match officials stated that it was a new injury. He scored 68 runs and bowled 6 overs giving 16 runs in the 1st innings as he was unable to bat and bowl in the 2nd innings of the 1st Test. He was ruled out of the 2nd test.

Shakib Al Hasan missed the Bangladesh's tour of New Zealand as the BCB granted him paternity leave for the duration of the entire tour.

Shakib opted to sit out the test series against Sri Lanka in April to play in the 2021 IPL which was granted by the BCB.

Shakib and Fizz were selected in Bangladesh's 23-member preliminary squad for the ODI series against Sri Lanka during their playing in 2021 Indian Premier League. Shakib joined the national camp along with Mustafizur on 19 May 2021 since returning from India on 6 May via a chartered flight following the suspension of the 2021 IPL.

He returned to international cricket in the ODI series against Sri Lanka after withdrawing himself from New Zealand tour and test series in Sri Lanka. Though he could not perform well in the series scoring only 19 runs and picked up only 3 wickets at an average of 43.33 in 3 matches. He was included in the squad for all three formats for the series against Zimbabwe. In the one-off test, he failed with bat scoring only 3 runs in one innings and picked up 5 wickets in the match. In the opening match of the ODI series he became the leading wicket-taker for Bangladesh in ODIs, taking his 270th dismissal and consequently ended up picking a five-fer in the match. In the second ODI, he picked up 2 wickets for 42 runs and scored unbeaten 96 runs to help Bangladesh to take an unassailable lead of 2–0 in the series. In the third ODI he also contributed with both bat and ball. He was named Player of the Series for his all-round performance, scoring 145 runs at an average of 72.5 and picking up 8 wickets at an average of 14.75 in 3 matches. In the T20I series, he scored only 37 runs and picked up 3 wickets in 3 matches.

On 8 August 2021, he was nominated for ICC Player of the Month along with Mitchell Marsh and Hayden Walsh Jr. July 2021. On 11 August, he was announced as the winner. The following month, he was named in Bangladesh's squad for the 2021 ICC Men's T20 World Cup.

On 30 December 2021, Shakib was nominated for ICC Men's ODI Cricketer of the Year along with Babar Azam, Janneman Malan and Paul Stirling. On 20 January 2022, ICC announced ICC Team of the Year 2022 for all formats. Shakib was included in the ICC Men's ODI Team of the Year with his teammates Mushfuq and Fizz for his performance where in 9 matches, he managed to score 277 runs at an average of 39.57 with two 50s and he also scalped 17 wickets at an average of 17.52.

In February 2022, he was included in both ODI and T20I squad against Afghanistan. In the 3-match ODI series, he managed to score only 60 runs and picked up 5 wickets. His poor form continued in 2-match T20I series also, as he scored only 14 runs and picked up 2 wickets at an average of 25.

=== 2023–2024 ===
In the 2nd ODI against England Shakib scored 58 runs from 69 balls while chasing a tough target of 327 runs set by England. In 3rd ODI, he become the first Bangladeshi bowler and 14th overall to take 300 wickets in One day international. In April 2023, he surpassed Southee to become the leading wicket-taker in T20Is with 136 wickets in 114 matches. He was then awarded the player of the month for March. He became Bangladesh's ODI Captain for Asia Cup and World Cup after Tamim Iqbal decided to step down on 3 August 2023.

In May 2024, he was named in Bangladesh's squad for the 2024 ICC Men's T20 World Cup tournament. On 26 September 2024, Shakib announced his retirement from T20Is and stated that the 2nd Test against India could be his last Test. He also confirmed that he will retire from international cricket after the 2025 ICC Champions Trophy.

== Disciplinary issues ==
- In October 2010, Shakib was on 92 in the fourth ODI against New Zealand, when there was movement near the sightscreen, which the umpires failed to stop. After a few minutes Shakib, Bangladesh captain at the time, ran towards the sightscreen, hurled abuse and threatened to hit the offender with his bat. He was later warned by the match referee.
- In March 2011, during the world cup match against West Indies, several people in the Sher-e-Bangla National Cricket Stadium grandstand complained Shakib had reacted too strongly when he was booed. The offending picture was spread over the internet and published in several newspapers. Within days of that incident, Shakib blasted former national cricketers in his Prothom Alo column.
- In February 2014, Shakib was fined ৳3 lakh (US$2,400) and was handed a three-ODI ban, because he had made an indecent gesture towards his crotch in the dressing room live on broadcast, during the second ODI against Sri Lanka. Shakib later made a public apology statement through his official Facebook page.
- International ban: On 7 July 2014, Shakib was banned for eight months from all forms of cricket for what the Bangladesh Cricket Board described as a "severe attitude problem". Shakib missed Bangladesh's tour of the West Indies; he was also prohibited to participate in foreign tournaments until 31 December 2015. Controversy arose when Shakib left to play for the Barbados Tridents of the Caribbean Premier League, allegedly without informing board officials and without obtaining a No Objection Certificate from the board, a claim he has denied. Shakib found himself embroiled in further controversy after a dispute with coach Chandika Hathurusingha led to rumours of him threatening to retire from Test and One Day cricket. The BCB has ended the restriction on no-objection certificates being issued to Bangladesh all-rounder Shakib Al Hasan, leaving him free to participate in overseas tournaments. BCB reduced his ban by three and a half months on 26 August 2014 letting him play for Bangladesh from 15 September 2014.
- During the 6th T20I match which was a controversial tense clash between Sri Lanka and Bangladesh as a part of the 2018 Nidahas Trophy, he argued the poor umpiring errors for not signalling a "no ball" delivery when Isuru Udana bowled 2 short pitched bouncer deliveries to Mustafizur Rahman in the last over of the match, where Bangladesh needed 12 runs to victory off the six balls. Fellow cricketer, Mahmudullah who was on the non-striker's end when Mustafizur Rahman was batting, demanded a no-ball delivery from the on-field umpires. Shakib later threatened to leave the field and recalled the batsmen from the field as a result of the umpiring errors. Reserve Bangladeshi cricketer, Nurul Hasan was also suspected to have breached the code of conduct for exchanging war of words with Sri Lankan skipper, Thisara Perera. It was also revealed that Shakib exchanged arguments with Sri Lankan commentator Russell Arnold. The International Cricket Council later imposed a 25 percent fine and issued a demerit point to both Shakib and Nurul Hasan for their unruly behaviour on the field by breaching the code of ethics.
- Players strike: Shakib also led a players' strike which existed for a brief period of time from 21 October 2019 to 23 October 2019 demanding for higher salaries especially in domestic first class cricket system and issues related to proposal of Bangladesh Premier League to adopt the franchise method. He along with fellow players reportedly addressed the pay dispute issue to the media and even threatened to boycott the tour of India and the rest of international cricket season until their demands were to be fulfilled. However, the issue was sorted out as the BCB accepted to fulfill the demand of the players by offering salary increments. During the time when he was leading the players' strike, he was also accused for breaching the agreement with BCB by signing a sponsorship deal as an ambassador for an undisclosed amount with a leading telecommunication operator called Grameenphone which is also a former national team sponsor.
- International ban: Shakib was initially selected to lead the team in the T20I and Test series against India, but on 29 October 2019, Shakib was suspended for one year and banned from all forms of cricket for two years by the International Cricket Council for breaching the ICC-Anti Corruption Code. Shakib was supposedly contacted by bookmakers while playing in the 2018 Bangladesh Tri-Nation Series and also in a group match between Sunrisers Hyderabad and Kings XI Punjab in the 2018 Indian Premier League. For failing to report those approaches made to him by the bookmakers, he was found guilty of breaching the ICC Anti-Corruption Code 2.4.4 and was handed a two-year ban, one year being suspended. He was able to resume international cricket as of 29 October 2020.
- In June 2021, during the 40th group match between Abahani Limited and Mohammedan Sporting Club of the 2021 Dhaka Premier League, Shakib kicked and broke the stumps after umpire Imran Parvez turned down a LBW appeal. He was bowling against Mushfiqur Rahim in the fifth over of the innings and kicked the stumps as soon as the umpire refused to concede to his appeal. In the same match, he also himself uprooted the stumps when the umpire halted the match due to rain in the following over. However, Shakib later made a public apology statement through his official Facebook page calling his behaviour as a "human error". Following the incident, Shakib was suspended for three matches of the tournament and was fined ৳5 lakh (US$4,100) by the BCB. The BCB also announced that a panel would be set up to investigate claims of biased umpiring in domestic cricket.
- In March 2022, he was included in the Bangladesh squad for their Test and ODI Series against South Africa to be played in March–April 2022. But after the Afghanistan series, while leaving for vacation in Dubai, he stated in front of the media that he is not in a physical and mental state to play in South Africa, even he felt like "a passenger" during the recently concluded Afghanistan series. In reply, BCB President Nazmul Hassan Papon showed frustration for his selective match playing and questioned his commitment towards the national team. Later, he was given a break until 30 April 2022 from all forms of cricket. However, a day after, he was officially given rest by the board, he agreed to tour South Africa to play in both ODI and Test series.

== Controversies ==
=== Quota reform movement ===
Shakib's tenure as MP from the parliamentary seat of Magura-1, was cut short in August 2024, following the 2024 Bangladesh quota reform movement and the Non-cooperation movement (2024). He was criticised by protesters and former Bangladesh Cricket Board member Mohammad Rafiqul Islam Khan for staying silent during the July massacre. Despite calls for him and other players perceived to be loyal to the Awami League government of ousted prime minister Sheikh Hasina to be excluded from the national team, the Yunus interim government allowed him to continue playing for Bangladesh. A murder case was filed against him for ordering the killing of a garment worker, Rubel, during movement. Shakib later apologised for his silence throughout the protests and expressed his wish to be able to return to Bangladesh for his final Test match. In the end Shakib did not return to Bangladesh to play his final test match and decided to travel to the United States instead.

In April 2025, the Bangladesh Financial Intelligence Unit seized all of his bank accounts.

=== Stock manipulation and penalty ===
In September 2024, Bangladesh Securities and Exchange Commission (BSEC) fined him Tk 50 lakh on charges of manipulation in share transactions.

=== IFIC Bank cheque fraud ===
In 2017, Shakib's company '‘Shakib Al Hasan Agro Farm’’, took a loan of total 2.5 crore taka from IFIC Bank. Two checks were issued by the company to repay the loan. However, there were insufficient funds in the bank account to cover the checks, resulting in the checks being dishonored. On December 15, 2024, the bank authorities filed a case against Shakib and three others for check fraud. On January 19, 2025, an arrest warrant was issued against Shakib for failing to appear in court in connection with the case. On March 24, 2025, the court ordered the seizure of Hasan's assets.

=== Birthday greeting to Sheikh Hasina ===
In September 2025, Shakib drew criticism after posting a birthday message for former Prime Minister Sheikh Hasina, who had fled the country following the 2024 mass uprising. Following this, Sports Adviser Asif Mahmud stated that Shakib's exclusion from the national team was justified due to his perceived association with Awami League.

== Personal life ==
Shakib completed secondary and higher secondary education at the Bangladesh Krira Shikkha Protishtan (BKSP) and obtained graduation in BBA from American International University-Bangladesh (AIUB).

Shakib's father is Khondoker Masroor Reza and his mother is Shirin Reza.

He married Umme Ahmed Shishir, a Bangladeshi American on 12 December 2012. The couple met in 2010 while Shakib was playing county cricket for Worcestershire in England. They had their first daughter Alayna Aubrey Hasan on 8 November 2015, their second daughter Errum Hasan on 24 April 2020 and their first son Eyzah Al Hasan on 16 March 2021.

In August 2018, he became a green card holder which allows him to live and work in the US.

Shakib is the chairman of Monarch Holdings was the goodwill ambassador of UNICEF for Bangladesh, Huawei and Anti-Corruption Commission (Bangladesh). Shakib announced a new company named Burak Commodities Exchange Co in August 2021 to enter into the gold business.

== Politics ==
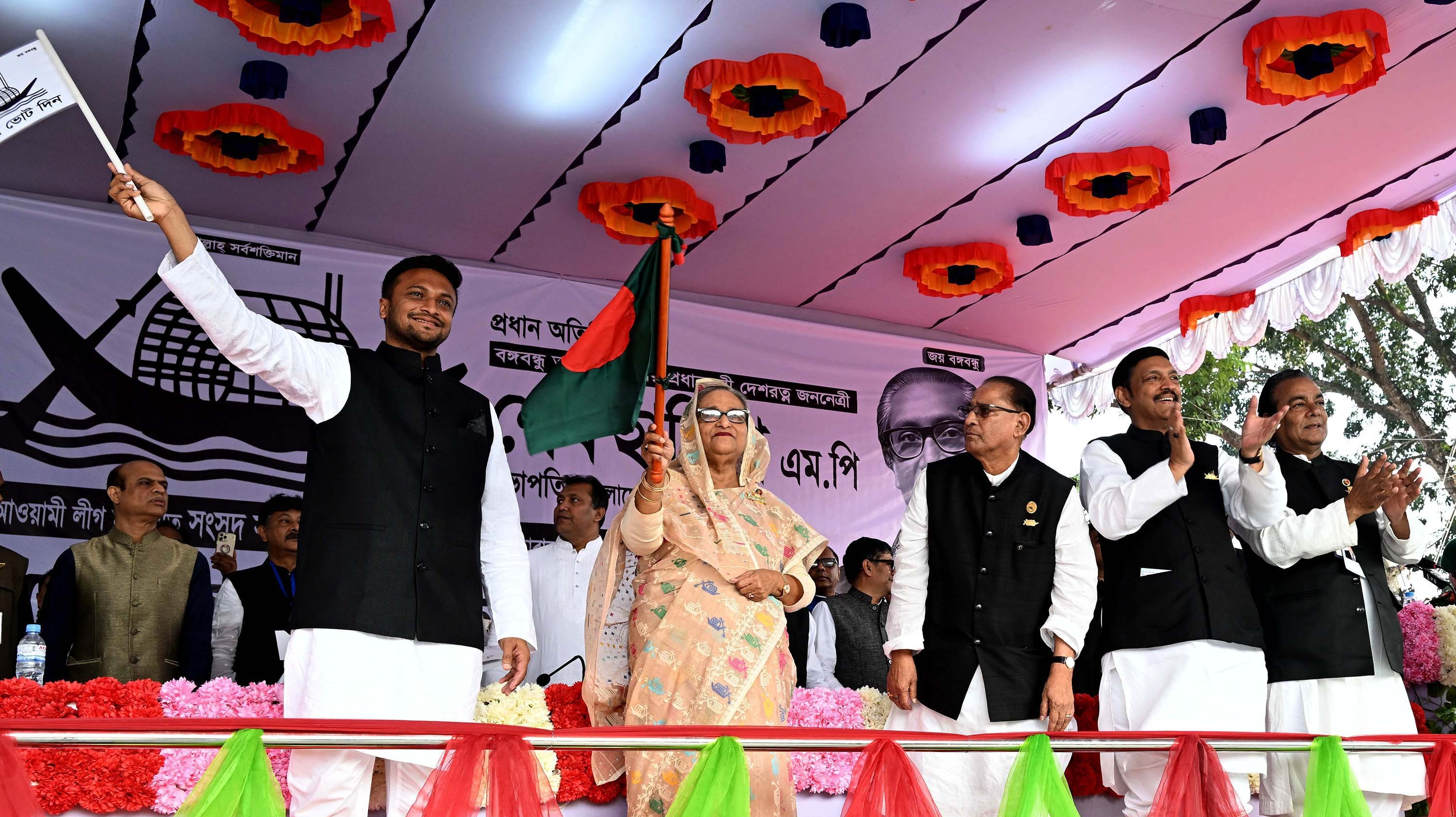
Hasan during his election campaign with then Prime Minister Sheikh Hasina in 2024.

Shakib Al Hasan officially joined the ruling Awami League party in 2023 and subsequently contested the 2024 Bangladeshi general election as the party's candidate for the Magura-1 parliamentary constituency, where he secured a victory.

However, in August 2024, his tenure as a Member of Parliament ended following the dissolution of the Jatiya Sangsad by the President.

In the 2026 Bangladeshi general election, Munowar Hossain Khan of the Bangladesh Nationalist Party was elected as the new Member of Parliament for Magura-1, replacing Shakib Al Hasan.

== Philanthropy ==
Shakib runs a charity organization named SAHF (Shakib Al Hasan Foundation) to carry on his philanthropic works since 2020. The foundation started a project named 'Mission Save Bangladesh' to help 2000 families in March 2020. In April 2020, Shakib auctioned his 2019 Cricket World Cup bat for COVID-19 relief.

== International centuries ==
Test centuries by Shakib Al Hasan
| No. | Runs | Against | Venue | H/A | Date | Result | Ref |
|---|---|---|---|---|---|---|---|
| 1 | 100 | New Zealand | Seddon Park, Hamilton | Away | 15 February 2010 | Lost | |
| 2 | 144 | Pakistan | Sher-e-Bangla National Cricket Stadium, Dhaka | Home | 17 December 2011 | Lost | |
| 3 | 137 | Zimbabwe | Sheikh Abu Naser Stadium, Khulna | Home | 3 November 2014 | Won | |
| 4 | 217 | New Zealand | Basin Reserve, Wellington | Away | 12 January 2017 | Lost | |
| 5 | 116 | Sri Lanka | Paikiasothy Saravanamuttu Stadium, Colombo | Away | 15 March 2017 | Won | |

ODI centuries by Shakib Al Hasan
| No. | Runs | Against | Venue | H/A/N | Date | Result | Ref |
|---|---|---|---|---|---|---|---|
| 1 | 134 not out | Canada | Antigua Recreation Ground, St. John's | Neutral | 28 February 2007 | Won | |
| 2 | 108 | Pakistan | Multan Cricket Stadium, Multan | Away | 16 April 2008 | Lost | |
| 3 | 104 | Zimbabwe | Queens Sports Club, Bulawayo | Away | 11 August 2009 | Won | |
| 4 | 105 not out | Zimbabwe | Sher-e-Bangla National Cricket Stadium, Dhaka | Home | 29 October 2009 | Won | |
| 5 | 106 | New Zealand | Sher-e-Bangla National Cricket Stadium, Dhaka | Home | 14 October 2010 | Won | |
| 6 | 101 | Zimbabwe | Zohur Ahmed Chowdhury Stadium, Chittagong | Home | 21 November 2014 | Won | |
| 7 | 114 | New Zealand | Sophia Gardens, Cardiff | Neutral | 9 June 2017 | Won | |
| 8 | 121 | England | Sophia Gardens, Cardiff | Away | 8 June 2019 | Lost | |
| 9 | 124 not out | West Indies | The Cooper Associates County Ground, Taunton | Neutral | 17 June 2019 | Won | |

== Records and achievements ==
=== Captaincy record ===
Shakib's record as captain
| Format | Matches | Won | Lost | Drawn/NR |
|---|---|---|---|---|
| Test | 19 | 4 (Note: Mortaza began the first Test against the West Indies in 2009 as captain; the win is not counted as being part of Shakib's term in charge) | 15 | 0 |
| ODI | 62 | 27 | 34 | 1 |
| T20I | 39 | 16 | 23 | 0 |
Last updated on: 30 December 2023

==== Test ====
He was the standing captain in the first test against West Indies in 2009 when regular captain Mashrafe Mortaza left the field on the first day due to injury. Bangladesh went on to win the test match which was the first away test win for Bangladesh. He also captained the team for the second test as well, leading the team to win the match and consequently the series, which was also their first away test series win. He was named Player of the Series for his all-round performance.

He captained Bangladesh against West Indies in 2018–19 when Bangladesh defeated them 2–0, which was their second test series win against them. He was named Player of the Series for his all-round performances. During his stint as test captain, Bangladesh won only these 4 tests out of 19 matches.

==== ODI ====
Bangladesh played 55 ODI matches under his captaincy from 2009 to 2015 and 2023 and won 27 matches. In World Cups, he captained in 2011 and 2023 Cricket World Cup, including 1 match in 2015.

==== T20I ====
Bangladesh also played 39 T20I matches under his captaincy, winning 16 matches. In World Cups, he captained Bangladesh in 2021 and 2022 editions.

He captained Bangladesh against England in 2022–23, when Bangladesh defeated them 3–0, which was their first T20I series win against them.

=== International record ===
- The first and only cricketer in history to be ranked the 'No.1 all-rounder' by ICC in its Player Rankings of All rounders in all three (Note: Test, One Day International and T20 Internationals) formats of the game (On 12 January 2015).
- Highest-ever international wicket-taker as a left-arm spinner (712).
- Only all-rounder with 7000 runs and 300 wickets double across all formats in a single country (Bangladesh).
- Highest partnership record for any wicket for a Bangladeshi pair in ODIs, with Mahmadullah (224). (Note: Later it was broken by Tamim Iqbal-Liton Das pair who scored 292 against Zimbabwe in 2020.) (Also the highest ever 5th wicket runs stand in the history of ICC Champions Trophy)
- Fastest and one of the fifth (Note: surpassing Ian Botham who took 55 matches to reach the milestone.Chris Cairns in 58 matches with Andrew Flintoff registering the same in 69 and Kapil Dev in 73 Test matches.) all-rounder to 3000 runs and 200 wickets double in Tests (54 matches).
- Fastest (Note: surpassing the previous record of 258 matches by Abdur Razzaq) and one of the fifth all-rounder (Note: other four all-rounders who had the record are Abdul Razzaq, Shahid Afridi, Sanath Jayasuriya and Jacques Kallis) to 5000 runs and take 250 double in ODI (in 199 matches).
- Fastest and one of the third all-rounder (Note: the other two who achieved the mark are Shahid Afridi (283) and Dwayne Bravo (292).) to 4,000 runs and 300 wickets double in T20s (in 260 matches).
- First and only all-rounder to have 100 wickets and 1,000 runs double in men's T20Is.
- Fastest player to 3000 runs and 200 wicket double in Tests.
- Fastest and one of fourth all-rounder (Note: others three cricketers are Sanath Jayasuriya(304), Jacques Kallis(296) and Shahid Afridi(294).) to 6000 runs and 250 wickets double in ODIs (202 matches).
- Fastest, youngest and the only seventh cricketer to 4,000 runs and 200 wickets double in ODIs (in 156 matches). (Note: other cricketers are Sanath Jayasuriya (235 matches), Shahid Afridi (238 matches), Jacques Kallis (221 matches), Abdul Razzaq (204 matches), Chris Harris (244 matches) and Chris Cairns (213 matches))
- First spin bowler, and third player overall, (Note: The other two cricketers are Wasim Akram(122) and Waqar Younis(114) at Sharjah Cricket Stadium.) to take more than 100 ODI wickets on a single ground (119 at Sher-e-Bangla National Stadium).
- Most wickets taken in Twenty20 cricket on a single ground (169 at Shere Bangla National Stadium, Mirpur).
- The 3rd (Note: 1st being Tim Southee with 157 wickets and 2nd being Rashid Khan with 152 wickets.) leading wicket-taker in men's T20Is (149 wickets).
- Leading wicket taker in T20 World Cups (Note: surpassing Shahid Afridi, taking his 40th dismissal) (50 wickets).
- The quickest allrounder, in terms of matches (59) to achieve the double of 4,000 runs and 200 wickets in test cricket.(In December 2021, in the 2nd test against Pakistan)
- The first Bangladeshi player to take 300 wickets in ODI and also became the third all-rounder to achieve the double of 6000 runs and 300 wickets in ODI (On 6 March 2023, during the 3rd ODI against England).
- Only player in the ODI World Cup history with 1000+ runs and 40+ wickets.
- The only player in the history of Cricket to be awarded Player of the Series at least 5 times in each format.
- First and only cricketer with 14,000 runs and 700 wickets.
- Only all-rounder to take 100 wickets and score 1000 runs in all formats.

=== List A and T20 records ===
- First and only cricketer with the double of 7,000 runs and 500 wickets in T20 cricket.
- First left arm off spinner to 500 wickets in T20 cricket.
- He has received the most Player of the Series Awards in T20s. (9 times)
- He has taken the most number of Five-wicket haul in T20s, among spinners. (5 times)

=== National record ===
- First Bangladeshi cricketer to score 4000 runs in ODIs.
- First Bangladeshi bowler to take 500 international wickets.
- First Bangladeshi bowler to take 200 wickets in Tests.
- Most number of wickets taken in Test (233), ODI (317) and T20I (140) for Bangladesh. (Note: as of 6 March 2024)
- Most number of wickets taken combining all formats for Bangladesh (690 wickets). (Note: as of 6 March 2024.)
- Second (Note: First being Tamim Iqbal.) Bangladeshi batsmen to score 10,000 international runs.
- Second highest individual score (217) by a Bangladeshi batsman in Tests. (Note: Highest one is by Mushfiqur Rahim who scored 219* against Zimbabwe in 2018.)
- Third-highest run-scorer for Bangladesh in all formats (12,070 runs) as of 18 July 2021. (Note: behind Tamim Iqbal (14023) and Mushfiqur Rahim (12599).)
- Only 2nd Bangladeshi to score 50 50s and 2nd on most 50s for Bangladesh in ODIs. (Note: First being Tamim Iqbal)

=== Other achievements ===
- ICC Men's ODI Team of the Decade: 2011–2020
- 2019 Cricket World Cup: Team of the tournament. (Note: for his all-round performance, 606 runs and 12 wickets in 8 matches.)
- ICC Men's Test Team of the Year: 2009.
- ICC Men's ODI Team of the Year: 2021.
- ICC Men's Player of the Month: July 2021, March 2023.
- Wisden ODI MVP(Most Valuable Player) of 21st century: 2nd Position.
- Wisden Test MVP(Most Valuable Player) of 21st century: 6th Position.
- Wisden's ODI Team of the Decade: 2010–2020.
- Wisden Test Player of the Year: 2009.
- Cricket Australia ODI Team of the Decade: 2010–2020.

== Notes ==
Sporting positions
| Preceded by Mashrafe Mortaza | Bangladesh national cricket captain (Test); 2009–2011 | Succeeded by Mushfiqur Rahim |
| Preceded by Mashrafe Mortaza | Bangladesh national cricket captain (ODI); 2010–2011 | Succeeded by Mushfiqur Rahim |
| Preceded by Mashrafe Mortaza | Bangladesh national cricket captain (T20I); 2009–2010 | Succeeded by Mushfiqur Rahim |
| Preceded by Tamim Iqbal | Bangladesh national cricket captain (Test); 2017–2018 | Succeeded by Mahmudullah |
| Preceded by Mashrafe Mortaza | Bangladesh national cricket captain (T20I); 2018–2019 | Succeeded by Mahmudullah |
| Preceded by Mominul Haque | Bangladesh national cricket captain (Test); 2022–2023 | Succeeded by Najmul Hossain Shanto |
| Preceded by Mosaddek Hossain | Bangladesh national cricket captain (T20I); 2023 | Succeeded by Najmul Hossain Shanto |
| Preceded by Tamim Iqbal | Bangladesh national cricket captain (ODI); 2023 | Succeeded by Najmul Hossain Shanto |
