= PNS Khaibar =

PNS Khaibar may refer to following ships of Pakistan Navy:

- PNS Khaibar (1956), the former British Battle-class destroyer HMS Cadiz (D79) acquired by Pakistan in 1956 and sunk in the Indo-Pakistan War of 1971.
- PNS Khaibar (1989), the former United States Brooke-class frigate USS Brooke (FFG-1) acquired by Pakistan in 1989 and returned in 1993. She was scrapped in 1994.
- PNS Khaibar (1994), the former British Type 21 frigate HMS Arrow (F173) acquired by Pakistan in 1994.
- PNS Khaibar (2025), the Babur-class corvette (F282) built by ASFAT Inc. for Pakistan. Commissioned in December 2025.
