= M. H. Khan =

Bangladeshi admiral (1932–2018)

Musharraf Hussain Khan
- মোশাররফ হোসেন খান
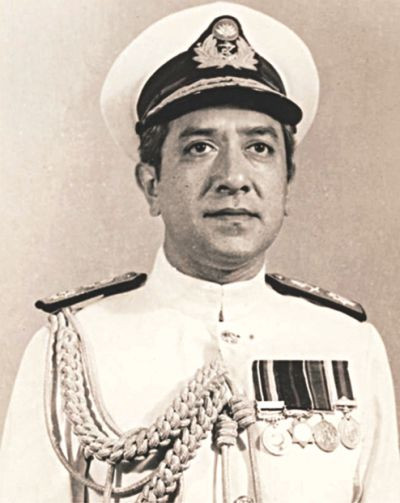

2nd Chief of Naval Staff
- In office 7 November 1973 – 3 November 1979
- President: Abu Sayeed Chowdhury; Mohammad Mohammadullah; Sheikh Mujibur Rahman; Khondaker Mostaq Ahmad; Abu Sadat Sayem; Ziaur Rahman
- Prime Minister: Sheikh Mujibur Rahman; Muhammad Mansur Ali; Masihur Rahman (acting); Shah Azizur Rahman
- Preceded by: Nurul Huq
- Succeeded by: Mahbub Ali Khan

Personal details
- Born: 1 February 1932 Berhampore, Bengal Presidency, British India
- Died: 13 October 2018 (aged 86) Dhaka, Bangladesh

Military service
- Allegiance: Bangladesh; Pakistan (before 1971)
- Branch/service: Pakistan Navy; Bangladesh Navy
- Years of service: 1954 – 1979
- Rank: Rear Admiral
- Commands: Commander, PNS Babur; Commander, Chittagong Naval Area (COMCHIT); Assistant Chief of Naval Staff (Operations); Chief of Naval Staff
- Battles/wars: Indo-Pakistani War of 1965; Bangladesh Liberation War

Musharraf Hussain Khan (known as M H Khan; 1 February 1932 – 13 October 2018) was a Bangladesh Navy admiral who served as the chief of the Bangladesh Navy from 7 November 1973 to 3 November 1979. He served as deputy chief martial law administrator of Bangladesh from 1975 to 1977 with Army Chief Ziaur Rahman and Air Chief Air Vice Marshal Muhammad Ghulam Tawab.

He achieved the rank of captain and commanded several of the primary naval ships of the Pakistan Navy, including the cruiser PNS Babur and the flagship destroyer PNS Khaibar. Admiral Khan created the Bangladesh Navy from scratch in very difficult circumstances but was able to create and implement the framework upon which the Bangladesh Navy has been built, following the scope and plan that he laid out in his six plus years as naval chief.

== Early life and education ==
Khan was born on 1 February 1932 in Berhampore. Khan was the second of four sons of Muazzam H. Khan, who was director general (analysis wing) of Inter-Services Intelligence during the 1950s, and Shafia Khan.

He was educated in schools of several districts, as his father, being in the Imperial Police Service, moved frequently for work. In 1947, Musharraf H. Khan was eager to join the Navy and commenced his naval journey by joining as a cadet at the naval boarding ship school, Dufferin, located in Bombay (now Mumbai). He graduated in 1950 and then applied to join the Pakistan Navy.

== Career ==
M. H. Khan joined the Pakistan Navy in 1950. Upon selection as a cadet in the Pakistan Navy, he was sent to the Royal Navy for training. In 1951 he entered Royal Naval College Dartmouth, and after a few years of sea time on RN ships, he subsequently, as a sub lieutenant was selected to attend the Royal Naval College, Greenwich, in 1954. He served on several Royal Naval ships, including the aircraft carrier HMS Eagle.

On completion of his sea time with the Royal Navy and his initial education and training at the Royal Naval Colleges Dartmouth and Greenwich, he returned to the UK in 1957, where he received further training in the UK at HMS Dryad in advanced navigation and direction, which became his naval specialization.

Khan married Fahmida in January 1961. In 1964, he was selected for further training at the Defence Nuclear, Biological and Chemical School in England. Fahmida, leaving their young son in the care of her mother-in-law in Dhaka, flew out to join Khan in Salisbury, and the two of them toured Europe and the Middle East for six weeks on their way home.

Shortly after returning to Karachi, Khan was sent back to England to collect PNS Jessore, a coastal patrol craft being built by Brooke Marine in Lowestoft. During the Indo-Pakistani war of 1965, he patrolled from Karachi in the Jessore. After the war he was deputed to the Ministry of Commerce to be Controller of Shipping in Karachi. On his return to the Pakistan Navy, he served as executive officer of two destroyers before being given command of the cruiser PNS Babur, the largest ship of the Pakistan Navy. In 1970, he commanded PNS Khaibar.

After the Bangladesh Liberation War broke out, he was relieved of sea duty, along with all other Bengali navy personnel, on 12 April 1971. For the remainder of the war, he was sent on training courses and held various shore positions. After the war, in March 1972, he and his family were interned in Pakistan Navy Station Karsaz.

He self-published an autobiography, Memoir of M.H. Khan: Turbulence in the Indian Subcontinent, two years before his death.

== Death ==
Admiral M. H. Khan died on 12 October 2018 at Combined Military Hospital Dhaka.

== Awards and decorations ==

Tamgha-e-Diffa (General Service Medal)	Sitara-e-Harb 1965 War (War Star 1965)	Tamgha-e-Jang 1965 War (War Medal 1965)	Tamgha-e-Jamhuria (Republic Commemoration Medal) 1956
