= Ekhlas Uddin Ahmed (politician) =

Bangladeshi politician

Member of Bangladesh Parliament
- In office 1973–1976

Personal details
- Born: 1932
- Died: 1985 (aged 52–53)
- Party: Awami League

Ekhlas Uddin Ahmed (Bengali: এখলাস উদ্দিন আহমদ) is an Awami League politician and a former member of parliament for Jessore-12.

== Career ==
Ahmed was elected to parliament from Jessore-12 as an Awami League candidate in 1973.
