= National River Conservation Commission =

- Formation: 2014
- Headquarters: Dhaka, Bangladesh
- Official language: Bengali
- Chairman: Sarwar Mahmud
- Website: nrcc.gov.bd

National River Conservation Commission (Bengali: জাতীয় নদী রক্ষা কমিশন) is a Bangladesh government regulatory agency and statutory body responsible for protecting rivers in Bangladesh. Sarwar Mahmud is the chairman of the commission.

== History ==
In 2009, Bangladesh High Court Division ordered the government to establish a National River Conservation Commission. The National River Conservation Commission was established in September 2014 following the passage of the National River Conservation Commission Act, 2013.

In December 2020, National River Conservation Commission proposed a Draft National River Conservation Commission Act, 2020 to replace the National River Conservation Commission Act, 2013 and make the commission more independent. Despite the commission finding Three Angle Marine Ltd involved in grabbing river land, the Ministry of Shipping awarded contracts to the company through Bangladesh Inland Water Transport Authority and Bangladesh Inland Water Transport Corporation. The Minister of Shipping, Khalid Mahmud Chowdhury, defended the company and denied any knowledge of the river land grabbing. No action was taken against around 70 percent of the river land grabbers identified by the River Commission. The commission was criticised for not naming the 37,000 land grabbers it identified.

In February 2022, Manjur Ahmed Chowdhury, chairman of Centre for Governance Studies and former president of Zoological Society of Bangladesh, was appointed chairman of National River Conservation Commission. In September 2023, Ahmed said interference from the government and lack of cooperation was making the commission ineffective. He blamed Dipu Moni, Minister of Education and member of parliament, for getting the Chandpur District Commissioner and a Hilsa fish researcher removed. He called for the jailing of Atiqul Islam, Mayor of North Dhaka City, and Taqsem A Khan, managing director of Dhaka WASA, for failing in their duties to protect rivers. He also criticized the budget of 50 million BDT as being insufficient. On 18 October 2023, the government of Bangladesh removed him citing "public interest". The removal was criticized by Transparency International Bangladesh saying it contradicted governments commitment to protect rivers.
