= Fahmida Haque =

Bangladeshi politician

- ফাহমিদা হক

Member of the Bangladesh Parliament for Women's Reserved Seat–18
- Incumbent
- Assumed office 3 May 2026
- Preceded by: Tarana Halim

Personal details
- Party: Bangladesh Nationalist Party
- Spouse: Zillur Rahman

Fahmida Haque is a Bangladeshi politician. She is the incumbent Jatiya Sangsad member from the Women's Reserved Seat–18 since May 2026.

== Background ==
Fahmida Haque originated from Belabo Upazila under Narsingdi District and she grew up in Dhaka. She is married to Zillur Rahman, a notable television talk show host of Tritiyo Matra.

== Career ==
Haque is a member of the board of directors of Centre for Governance Studies (CGS). She is the assistant secretary for international affairs at Bangladesh Nationalist Party.
