= International reactions to the 2026 United States elections =

Reactions to 2026 United States elections in other countries

Elections in the United States were held on November 3, 2026. In these midterm elections, which occurred during the non-consecutive second term of incumbent Republican president Donald Trump, all 435 seats in the U.S. House of Representatives and 35 of the 100 seats in the U.S. Senate were contested to determine the 120th United States Congress. Thirty-nine state and territorial U.S. gubernatorial elections, attorney general elections, and numerous state and local elections were also contested. The Democratic Party obtained a majority in the Senate and House of Representatives, and among state governorships across the United States for the first time since 2010.

International politicians expressed a range of feelings in response to the results, including excitement, hope, and relief, as well as worry or fatigue with the American political process. (Note: Attributed to multiple sources:)

== Reactions in Africa ==
Daily News Egypt noted that countries across Africa were watching the midterms closely, with the potential impact they could have on trade policies, security partnerships, development assistance, and diplomatic engagement. For several countries, reactions were also focused on celebrations of African diaspora candidates in various elections. (Note: Attributed to multiple sources:)

=== Central and Southern Africa ===
- Botswana: Former President Ian Khama celebrated the Republicans' defeat, saying "two years ago, there was a celebration in Botswana when a blue wave swept across the country, removing a failed leader rejected by voters. Today there is another celebration, this time in America, as another blue wave rejects a leader [Trump] who called on people to vote as if he were on the ballot."
- DR Congo: Communications Minister Patrick Muyaya Katembwe told Semafor that the DR Congo's strategic partnership with the U.S. is unlikely to be affected by the midterm results, with bipartisan support existing for recent agreements proving U.S. access to critical minerals and attempting to bring peace to the DR Congo's conflict-hit east.
- Namibia: Maximalliant Katjimune, a former member of the National Assembly for the Popular Democratic Movement, called the elections "an absolute indictment and rejection of the Trump administration. Trump came in for his second term on a ticket of ending wars and lowering the cost of living for Americans. Instead, he has done the complete opposite."
- South Africa: President Cyril Ramaphosa said "We have seen that the Democrats have taken control of the Senate and of the House, and the people of America have spoken" and that the results would "introduce a new era in world relations".
- Zimbabwe: Former minister Jonathan Moyo suggested "every electoral cycle proves the oldest American rule: the only constant is change. And almost every cycle produces a first that rewrites the historical ledger", adding "the electorate did not merely punish one party; it accelerated a demographic realignment that has been building in the US for decades. The lesson is stark: parties that treat the country’s changing face as a threat rather than a fact eventually discover that the fact is stronger."

=== East Africa ===
- Ethiopia: Melat Kiros, a Gen Z Ethiopian American woman who was elected to Congress from a House seat in Denver, was mentioned in an article by the Addis Standard where she was described as a "fierce human rights advocate", noting her public comments against wars in Tigray and Gaza. The BBC also mentioned Kiros in a roundup of several candidates of African heritage it wrote about, adding "for some young Africans watching from across the Atlantic, these victories have offered a glimpse of what a new generation of voters could achieve at home." The Addis Standard later talked as well about Congressman Joe Neguse, also from Colorado and the son of Eritrean immigrants, after he was elected to House Democratic leadership, quoting his statement "only in America could a son of African immigrants become Assistant Speaker of the U.S. House."
- Kenya: Nairobi Senator Edwin Sifuna, who served from 2018 to 2026 as general secretary of the main opposition Orange Democratic Movement, said "it feels very nice to see good people winning elections... bad people have been winning too much bwana."
- Mauritius: Vijay Makhan, a special advisor on diplomacy and international trade to the government of Mauritius, interpreted the result as "a disavowal of Trump's policies", while adding about the Chagos Archipelago specifically: "Congress can exercise real influence through hearings, investigations, legislation, defence and foreign-affairs appropriations, and its role in confirming senior officials... but it cannot, by a resolution or a committee hearing alone, dictate the President’s diplomacy or determine the terms of the UK–Mauritius agreement."
- Seychelles: The Seychelles News Agency reported that the U.S. embassy in Seychelles hosted a "midterm election breakfast" as election results started to be reported (local time), with members of the Ministry of Foreign Affairs & Diaspora and the National Assembly invited. The ministry later made a post thanking the embassy for putting on the event and describing the election as one with "some historic moments."
- Somalia: Foreign Minister Ali Omar Balcad, in an interview with Al Jazeera, refused to condemn vulgar comments made by Trump during the midterm campaign about Somalia and Somali Americans, saying "I am also a U.S. citizen. President Trump was elected by U.S. citizens, and he is the President of the United States. I am not responding to what he said."
- Somaliland: The Times of Israel noted that Chris Van Hollen, who launched a bid for leadership of the Senate Democratic Caucus after the election, once proposed legislation alongside Senator Jim Risch called the Somaliland Partnership Act, arguing "there is already a record of bipartisan congressional interest in Somaliland, although it has received considerably less attention than recent Republican initiatives."
- Sudan: Khalid Omer Yousif, a former cabinet minister and vice chair of the Sudanese Congress Party, wrote a piece for the Washington Examiner saying "after the blue tsunami, Sudan is still common ground" for both Democrats and Republicans, noting that the U.S. has an interest in preventing Russia from opening a naval port in Port Sudan, as well as in bringing an end to the ongoing civil war.
- Tanzania: Alaji Mustafa Nguyahambi, a senior lecturer at the University of Dodoma, commented that previous aid-cuts which had harmed countries like Tanzania could be altered by the shift in power in Congress, as might the diplomatic tone coming from the U.S. administration.
- Uganda: Ugandan ambassador to the U.S. Robie Kakonge said in an opinion article via New Vision that Uganda looks forward to "engaging constructively with the incoming congressional leadership, members of both political parties, and the administration of President Donald Trump" in advancing Uganda-United States relations, continuing on to say "the 2026 American midterm elections have opened a new chapter in American politics", but while "political outcomes may change [...] the long-term interests of nations and the importance of international partnerships endure."

=== North Africa ===
- Algeria: A viral internet theory, highlighted by Algeria's Liik Media among other sources, jokingly suggested that Algerians who visited Kansas during the 2026 FIFA World Cup were responsible for the state turning blue, particularly in the state's Senate race. (Note: Attributed to multiple sources:) About a week after the election, President Abdelmadjid Tebboune also hosted a delegation of political leaders and other residents from Kansas and Iowa, including the mayor of Lawrence, Kansas, in return for the warm hospitality Algerians had received from Kansans earlier in the year.
- Egypt: Foreign Minister Badr Abdelatty said following the election that he was "confident" U.S. military aid to Egypt would continue, noting that a "strong Egypt is very important for the interests of the United States". He responded in part to newly-elected Senator Abdul El-Sayed, whose family is of Egyptian origin, and who backs ending all U.S. military aid to Egypt. Positive public reaction in Egypt to El-Sayed's victory was noted by multiple media outlets, with TV host Amr Adib saying "say whatever you want about America, but the political life that allows Abdulrahman Mohamed El-Sayed to become a Senator, you gotta tip your hat to it." Government figures mostly remained silent, while government-linked media in some cases publicly dismissed El-Sayed's election and ties to Egypt, in response to El-Sayed's public opposition to President Abdel Fattah el-Sisi's rule.
- Libya: Prior to the election, Prime Minister Abdul Hamid Dbeibeh summoned the U.S. chargé d'affaires Inga Heemink to lodge his protests after Trump made comments at a campaign rally in Georgia where he labeled Libya (alongside Haiti, Somalia, and Yemen) as a "terror-infested" and "shithouse" country. Libyan officials stated their people should not be dragged into American political disputes, while Trump walked back his comments a few days later, describing Libyans in a post on Truth Social as "proud, resilient, and hospitable" people.
- Morocco: Yasmine Hasnaoui, a social sciences professor at Hassan I University, said "I see these results as a clear political rebuke to the Trump administration, but also as a message to the American political establishment as a whole", while adding that the results do not necessarily spell "bad news" for Morocco, noting that U.S. support for Morocco's claim over the Western Sahara in particular has been bipartisan.

=== West Africa ===
- Ghana: Alexander Afenyo-Markin, who leads the opposition New Patriotic Party in the Parliament of Ghana, used the results of the U.S. midterms to send a warning to the governing National Democratic Congress, pointing out how political power can quickly shift. As he suggested, Republicans had used their numbers to "intimidate" their opponents, only to suffer an electoral defeat, which could also happen to the NDC.
- Liberia: Latim Dathong, former Deputy Minister of Education and founder of Starz University in Monrovia, wrote a personal reflection titled "The America I Know: Change Has Come!" celebrating the political shift and the elections of Ilhan Omar, Abdul El-Sayed, Keisha Lance Bottoms, Gina Hinojosa, and Deb Haaland in particular, saying "these are not just election victories. They are powerful reminders of what America can be when people are allowed to participate, compete, and lead regardless of where they come from, what they look like, or what faith they practice."
- Nigeria: Reactions in Nigeria centered on celebration of Nigerian Americans who won offices in various elections, with Nigerians in Diaspora Commission chairperson Abike Dabiri counting fourteen such candidates as of November 5, including four Democrats in the Georgia House of Representatives. The list omitted KC Ohaebosim, the son of a Nigerian immigrant in Kansas, since the Kansas governor's race remained uncalled until November 12, though he won the race to become Lieutenant Governor of Kansas and the second black statewide official in Kansas' history.
- Sierra Leone: Media in Sierra Leone focused on the divided nature of the incoming U.S. government and the peaceful transfer of power, contrasting it with the country's own crisis in that regard following elections in 2023, as well as the possible impact of the midterms on visa restrictions in place for Sierra Leoneans and funding for the United States Agency for International Development, suggesting "Democratic lawmakers may seek to restore funding to selected programmes."

== Reactions in the Americas ==
=== Canadian reactions ===
Canada's minister responsible for Canada-U.S. Trade Dominic LeBlanc said that the election's results were interesting but would not change Canada's trade stance toward the United States, while Prime Minister Mark Carney followed up later saying Canada is indeed focused on the same issues as before the U.S. midterms, adding that Canada is a "confident country."

Opposition leader Pierre Poilievre responded to questions about the midterms by saying "Americans hate tariffs," suggesting that Canada should leverage goodwill it has from Americans to push for tariff-free trade.

Donald Wright, a political science professor at the University of New Brunswick, cautioned Canadians against assuming that the midterm results would lead to lessened tariffs, suggesting a vindictive Trump may instead ramp them up in response to Maine in particular voting out Republican Senator Susan Collins, who had opposed tariffs.

Quebec tabloid newspaper Le Journal de Montréal was noted by The Guardian in its global roundup of front-page headlines to have run "TOUTE UNE CLAQUE" (translating to "quite a slap" in English) with a picture of Trump's face beside the headline on the day after the election.

==== Reactions by provincial premiers ====
Several Premiers of Canadian provinces from across the country's political spectrum also commented on the results, including:

- Alberta: Premier Danielle Smith, of the United Conservative Party, called the results a "vindication" of her province's more subdued response to tariffs, and hopes for improved Canada-United States relations.
- British Columbia: Premier-designate Lorne Doerkson, of the Conservative Party of British Columbia, said he does not see a quick end to the trade war despite Republican losses, adding that American liquor would remain "off the shelves" in British Columbia stores in the meantime.
- Manitoba: Premier Wab Kinew, of the social democratic Manitoba NDP, congratulated Democrats for "absolutely dominating" Trump, calling for an end to tariffs, and stating that Canadians are "ready" to rebuild relations between the U.S. and Canada. Kinew also specifically congratulated Peggy Flanagan and Abdul El-Sayed on their victories in U.S. Senate races, and Deb Haaland on her victory in New Mexico's gubernatorial race.
- New Brunswick: Premier Susan Holt, of the New Brunswick Liberal Association, said she looks forward to building relationships with newly elected officials, and believes "their leadership will result in improved trade conditions."
- Nova Scotia: Premier Tim Houston, of the Progressive Conservative Association of Nova Scotia, said that "the American people spoke pretty loudly, I would say, and pretty clearly, and I'm hopeful that's a message [Trump] and his team receive."
- Ontario: Premier Doug Ford, of the Ontario PC Party, struck an excited tone, joking about doing "cartwheels down the street" as he watched results roll in, while stating the "cheese has slipped off the cracker" with Trump. Nonetheless, Ford stated he was under no illusions about the trade war being over.
- Quebec: Premier Paul St-Pierre Plamondon, of the sovereignist Parti Québécois, said his government would launch a "diplomatic offensive" with Americans following the results.
- Saskatchewan: Premier Scott Moe, of the conservative Saskatchewan Party, suggested the results "were at least due in part to the impact of those harmful tariff policies", adding "we now have an opportunity to reset our relationship with the U.S. and restore free and fair trade between our two countries."

=== Caribbean Community ===
- Antigua and Barbuda: Prime Minister Gaston Browne opened the 2026 Commonwealth Heads of Government Meeting on the same day as the midterms. While Browne's government did not comment on the midterm results, Australian PM Anthony Albanese noted they were a key topic at the meeting. Belizean PM Johnny Briceño also quoted a local sergeant who drove him around, saying the sergeant hopes the shift in power leads to an "ease" in visa restrictions on nationals of Antigua and Barbuda entering the U.S., as well as an end to the Iran war.
- Bahamas: Several Bahamian nationals in the U.S. were interviewed by the Nassau-based Our News, with one man living in Texas commenting on Governor-elect Gina Hinojosa's victory, saying "now I look at The Bahamas and say okay are we looking towards putting a female candidate out there for Prime Minister?" While another woman in Georgia expressed amazement with the statewide victories for African American women.
- Barbados: In an interview with CNN following the election, Prime Minister Mia Mottley said "when the U.S. sneezes, the Caribbean catches a cold", referring to the war in Iran and its impact on the cost of living around the world. She then added, "we heard the American population speak very clearly. We know they too are hurting."
- Belize: Prime Minister Johnny Briceño, speaking from Antigua and Barbuda, said "I’m hoping that certain things can be easier, the issue of immigration can ease up." Foreign Minister Francis Fonseca said that while the heads of foreign affairs committees in Congress will switch to Democrats, "in terms of the overall foreign policy, I don't see much change in that regard."
- Guyana: President Irfaan Ali said the results would not adversely impact Guyana-U.S. relations, while adding "in my view, the shift in the balance of power in the US translates into a decline or indeed a weakening of the Trump administration’s leverage over states like Guyana and allows for a recalibration of Guyana-US relations based on reasoned dialogue instead of coercive diplomacy and excessive demand-making by the US."
- Jamaica: Andrew Wheatley, a cabinet minister for the governing Jamaica Labour Party, said Jamaica's relations with the U.S. have not changed following the Democrats' retaking Congress, despite speculation arising over Jamaica's continued participation in the Trump administration's Third Country Nationals program in particular. Other reactions to the U.S. midterms in Jamaica have focused on victories by members of the Jamaican diaspora and Black American candidates in general. Elected candidates with Jamaican ancestry notably included congresswoman Yvette Clarke, as well as two gubernatorial candidates of opposite parties: Democrat Wes Moore in Maryland and Republican Byron Donalds in Florida, highlighted by news outlets such as the Jamaica Observer and The Gleaner.
- Saint Vincent and the Grenadines: Former Foreign Minister Keisal Peters, speaking on a radio show called The People's Forum, suggested that SVG should explore having their own midterm-style elections, noting similarities in how U.S. Republicans and SVG's New Democratic Party have governed, as well as their organizational ties through the International Democracy Union.
- Trinidad and Tobago: Prime Minister Kamla Persad-Bissessar shrugged off concerns of backlash either at home or from congressional Democrats abroad following the U.S. midterms, reiterating her "unwavering" support for Trump, while adding that Republicans lost "because of the prolonged war in Iran and its effects on fuel prices and the cost of living."

=== Latin America ===
Across Latin America, a common theme emerged of right-wing leaders aligned with the Trump administration mostly remaining silent on the results, while many left-wing and progressive politicians expressed celebratory remarks.

- Argentina: Economy Minister Luis Caputo downplayed the possibility of the results impacting U.S. assistance to Argentina, saying "for Argentina, nothing changes. It was an expected result," while former President Cristina Fernández de Kirchner of the left-wing Justicialist Party posted "Beautiful morning!!!" on X in response to the results.
- Bolivia: Former President Evo Morales said "the true American people are aware: they do not accept fascism or the genocide committed by their government alongside its ally Israel," adding "finally, they put a brake on [Trump]'s fascism. Dignity will always triumph over arrogance!"
- Brazil: President Lula da Silva used the results to mock his opponent Flávio Bolsonaro from the 2026 general election held just a week prior to the U.S. midterms, remarking that Bolsonaro brought "bad luck" and "made Trump lose" after leaving for Florida to avoid criminal charges in Brazil.
- Chile: Former President Gabriel Boric, speaking at Georgetown University, said neither the Democrats' victories in the U.S. nor Lula's in Brazil guarantee political change in Latin American countries governed by right-wing leaders. Boric also cautioned against "idolizing" foreign politicians and "transforming them into gods."
- Colombia: While President Abelardo de la Espriella was silent on the results, his 2026 presidential election opponent Senator Iván Cepeda called the results a defeat for "transnational fascism", while former President Gustavo Petro made several comments connecting the result to Lula da Silva's victory in Brazil and Benjamin Netanyahu's 2026 defeat in Israel, calling the result a "screeching halt to fascism", and celebrating the victories for Latino, African American, Indigenous, and women candidates. (Note: Attributed to multiple sources:) Petro further called on the result to be used to pressure action toward a two-state solution in Israel and Palestine. On November 12, Foreign Minister Omar Bula broke the Colombian government's silence to apologize to Kamala Harris and other Democrats for past social media comments, including one instance where he suggested Democrats "thrive in illegality." Acknowledging the midterm results, Bula called for "mutual respect and bipartisanship."
- Cuba: Lianys Torres Rivera, the charge d'affairs at the Embassy of Cuba, Washington, D.C., dismissed on the day of the election before any results were announced the possibility of anything changing in the realm of relations between the U.S. and Cuba from a shift in political power.
- Dominican Republic: Media outlets in the Dominican Republic highlighted victories by three Dominican American Democratic congressional candidates, including Darializa Avila Chevalier of New York, Manny Rutinel of Colorado, and Analilia Mejia of New Jersey.
- Ecuador: Former President Rafael Correa commented on the results in an interview with Radio Pichincha, describing the election as a pivotal development for Latin America, saying "this is very significant because it marks a turning point after so much abuse, aggression, and unilateralism; it opens up a period of hope, suggesting there will be more room for pluralism and for restoring international institutions." Francisco Carrión, who served as Ecuador's ambassador to the U.S. under former President Lenín Moreno, also suggested that any changes in U.S. policy will "trickle down" to Ecuador and other Latin American countries.
- Honduras: Luis Redondo, former president of the National Congress of Honduras, posted "the American people are telling the world: we are not all like Donald Trump. His decisions do not represent our voice or our values," going on to say "people are wise. Power is not eternal, and the truth will prevail. The United States was not built for one person, one party, or one branch of government to decide for everyone."
- Mexico: President Claudia Sheinbaum said the relationship between the U.S. and Mexico would remain unchanged despite the major rebuke Trump and Republicans faced, as she also highlighted and celebrated the victories of "Mexican-origin" Xavier Becerra and Gina Hinojosa in gubernatorial elections held in California and Texas respectively.
- Venezuela: Opposition figure and former governor of Miranda Henrique Capriles said the results would not change his demand for Acting President Delcy Rodríguez to step down, and reiterated his call for free presidential elections, as other reactions in the country also focused on how a newly Democratic Congress might impact the ongoing transition.

== Reactions in Asia ==
TaiwanPlus used the terms "reserved" and "pragmatic" to describe the general reaction across Asia, with statements and concerns by political leaders generally focused on impacts to negotiations about trade (Note: Attributed to multiple sources:) as well as conflicts in Iran, Gaza, and Yemen.

=== Central and South Asia ===
- Afghanistan: Several officials who served the former Islamic Republic of Afghanistan made comments. Nasir Ahmad Andisha, who still represents Afghanistan at the United Nations Office at Geneva, echoed Michigan Senator-elect Abdul El-Sayed's victory speech line saying "tonight, we can turn inshallah into alhamdulillah", while adding that faith without action was meaningless. Mohammad Omar Daudzai, former Interior Minister for the Islamic Republic, said "the recent US elections once again demonstrated one of the most important features of American democracy: the system’s inherent ability to correct itself, renew itself and reassess the country’s course through the will and votes of the people."
- Bangladesh: Zillur Rahman, the executive director for the Centre for Governance Studies, wrote a piece in The Daily Star saying that regarding trade, "it would be wrong to expect Democrats to resolve our trade problems, since their voters also want protection from economic insecurity", while suggesting that Democrats in Congress could renew support for Rohingya refugees in Bangladesh and protecting labor rights.
- India: Ministry of External Affairs spokesperson Randhir Jaiswal offered public comments a week following the election, saying "it is an internal matter of the United States. I have no specific comment on them beyond underlining that India and the United States' relationship enjoys bipartisan support in the United States." Jairam Ramesh, General Secretary of the opposition Indian National Congress, described the results as a "stunning verdict" against Trump, adding that they demonstrate the power of midterm elections as a tool to "enforce accountability."
- Kazakhstan: Kazinform, a state-run news organization, ran an article suggesting that "for Kazakhstan, the change in Washington brings both continuity and new openings. The foundation of the relationship has proved bipartisan", while noting as well that President Kassym-Jomart Tokayev has called for a freeze in the Russo-Ukrainian war and offered Turkistan as a venue for negotiations.
- Nepal: Former House of Representatives member Rajendra Bajgain wrote an article in The Himalayan Times addressing several topics, including trade between the U.S. and Nepal, Elon Musk's comments on Mukesh Ambani, and Anti-Indian sentiment espoused by a few Republicans, saying on that last point "Hindu, Indian and Nepali Americans can serve as a bridge: a reminder that diversity and national cohesion are not opposites. Republicans who want to grow their coalition should stop treating these voters as foreign and address their concerns about tariffs on India, H-1B visas and discrimination. Democrats should stop taking them for granted and take seriously their concerns about crime, school standards and order."
- Pakistan: Former Ambassador to the U.S. Husain Haqqani told Reuters that Pakistan's leadership had built a "transactional relationship" with Trump's team, with the country becoming deeply embedded in diplomacy between the U.S. and Iran, and that some arrangements involving Trump's relatives and friends "might not last" scrutiny from a Democratic Congress. Reuters also noted a striking divide between reactions by political leaders and by ordinary residents, with many ordinary Pakistanis supportive of the results.
- Sri Lanka: Opposition leader Sajith Premadasa, speaking on the floor of parliament, said "the people of the USA have rejected the Trump administration because of the suffering they had to undergo. The people of Sri Lanka are also suffering. The government should take note of this situation", suggesting they could otherwise face a similar defeat.
- Uzbekistan: Kamoliddin Rabbimov, an Uzbek political scientist, suggested three takeaways from the midterms: firstly, Americans are not inherently opposed to the idea of a war against Iran, though are troubled by the fact that Iran has "effectively emerged victorious." Secondly, a new generation of leaders is emerging in U.S. politics, who support a foreign policy of "restraint." Lastly, the Democrats' victory is more a defeat for Trump than it is an endorsement of Democratic Party policies.

=== East Asia ===
==== Chinese reactions ====
China's Ministry of Foreign Affairs spokesperson Mao Ning refrained from commenting directly on the results, describing the election as a "domestic affair" of the U.S., while also stating that China stands ready to work with the U.S. to deliver on common understandings "reached by the two heads of state".

In spite of the muted government reaction, the Chinese Communist Party's People’s Daily ran an article about post-election swings in the stock market titled "Mixing economy and politics gives US a bad post-midterm hangover", chalking up such swings to Democrats expressing "shrill concern over the electricity costs, water consumption and low employment potential of the unprecedented AI buildout." The South China Morning Post, based in Hong Kong, also ran an article cataloging reactions by Chinese internet users, with one person saying "everyone believes that a particular person or political party is the problem, but no one believes the fundamental cause is the flaws in the political system itself", while others criticized or mocked Trump's "unpredictable" foreign policy, and some described the U.S. as a "fake democracy."

Former U.S. ambassador to China Max Baucus, speaking from Hong Kong to Forbes in mid-November, suggested that the results of the midterms had "weakened" Trump's standing in China and elsewhere in Asia, based on what he had heard from local leaders. "There isn't much trust", Baucus added, continuing on to say he did not expect much to arise from Trump, Putin, and Xi Jinping's planned meeting on November 19 in Shenzhen.

==== Other reactions in East Asia ====
- Japan: Chief Cabinet Secretary Minoru Kihara said "Regardless of the outcome of this election, the Japan–US alliance is the cornerstone of Japan's foreign and security policy." Tomoko Tamura, chair of the Japanese Communist Party, described the election as a "stern rebuke of the Trump administration", while celebrating victories by members of the Democratic Socialists of America, including specifically Nithya Raman in the Los Angeles mayoral election.
- North Korea: While no statements have been released yet commenting on the election, North Korea was noted to have tested a new surface-to-air missile system at the same time Americans were voting, as Supreme Leader Kim Jong Un's sister Kim Yo Jong also released a statement on the same day calling the FBI's linkage of North Korea to the theft of $6.3 billion from Binance a "grave political provocation." Yang Moo-jin, a professor at the University of North Korean Studies, said “the near-simultaneous timing of the missile launches and Kim Yo-jong’s statement is [...] unusual, suggesting that the actions were planned in advance to coincide with the US midterm elections."
- South Korea: Kang Yu-jung, a senior spokesperson for the South Korean president, said the election results would not impact the South Korea-U.S. alliance, while pledging cooperation with the Trump administration and the new Congress. Prime Minister Han Seong-sook expressed similar remarks to Kang, while noting that the Democrats' victory was "much stronger than expected". On November 10, President Lee Jae Myung commented on the midterms himself in a cabinet meeting, saying his government would need to build bipartisan support in the U.S. Congress. Industry Minister Kim Jung-kwan, responding to stock market fears, also suggested the election result was unlikely to slow AI investment.
- Taiwan: The Ministry of Foreign Affairs released a statement following the election emphasizing that Taiwan maintains bipartisan backing in the U.S., in response to a request for comment on the results. Following drops in U.S. stock markets, the Taiwan Stock Exchange faced a similar sell off in reaction to midterm results, with TSMC in particular facing a ten percent drop over fears of backlash to data center construction.

=== Middle East ===
==== Iranian reactions ====
Iran's Supreme Leader Mojtaba Khamenei told Fars News Agency that "If there are still those who harbor even the slightest hope for a change in behavior or shifts in partisan and factional alignments within the oppressive system, or who believe that by offering concessions to America they can dissuade it from enmity toward the Iranian nation, they are gravely mistaken". Iranian Parliament speaker Mohammad Bagher Ghalibaf wrote on X that "Conscience or the cost of living, Americans said NO TO WAR, and we endorse this message" and that "if the US govt betrays their public will to serve international paymasters and blackmailers, it will learn our NO comes with a Nightmare". Supreme National Security Council secretary Mohsen Rezaei said on X that "The Iranian nation handed Trump a strategic defeat on the battlefield and in the Hormuz—and a POLITICAL DEFEAT in Washington" and that "Meanwhile, Americans got stuck with the bill for his war".

The Tehran Times, aligned with the Iranian administration, ran a front-page headline after the election saying "US hegemony Crumbling; Iran Will Never Surrender", which was later showcased in a global roundup of headlines by The Guardian.

Several non-state actors aligned with the Iran-led Axis of Resistance also commented on the results, including:

- Ahmad al-Hamidawi, Secretary-General of Kata'ib Hezbollah in Iraq, called the defeat of Republicans in the midterm elections a victory for Iran and the Axis of Resistance, whilst calling for a change of political course in Iraq.
- Naim Qassem, Secretary-General of Hezbollah in Lebanon, welcomed the Republican losses, describing the U.S. elections as an "earthquake." He said the results could help Lebanon maintain sovereignty and called on the state to resist the Trump administration's demand to disarm Hezbollah. MP Ali Fayyad, also a member of Hezbollah, said that changes resulting from the elections would "not impact" the group's position or calculations.

==== Other reactions in the Middle East ====
- Iraq: While not commenting publicly on the results, Prime Minister Ali al-Zaidi spoke with Trump over the phone two days after the election about peace negotiations with Iran and disarming of Iran-backed militias in Iraq.
- Israel: President Isaac Herzog stated following the election that he has "respect for President Trump, Vice President Vance, and the Democratic Party", emphasizing a commitment by Israel to maintaining bipartisan support from Americans, as other commentators such as Israeli-American journalist Gil Hoffman expressed worry about Israelis being blamed by Republican leaders for the results. Opposition leader Yair Lapid called for a plan to "rebuild trust" in the U.S., asserting that the incoming Democratic lawmakers "aren't against Israel" but rather "mainly against [Prime Minister Benjamin] Netanyahu — for them, anything connected to him is toxic".
- Jordan: Yusuf Mansur, former Minister of State for Economic Affairs writing for Ammon News, said it was worth noting statements by Senator-elect Abdul El-Sayed saying he wants to end military aid to countries in the region, including Jordan, adding "what Jordan needs now is to engage with these new winners — just as it has with their predecessors — and to explain its cooperation programmes in terms of their objectives and outcomes."
- Lebanon: Officials in Lebanon were reported to be monitoring how the U.S. midterms as well as 2026 elections in Israel might impact negotiations between Israel and Lebanon, alongside those between the U.S. and Iran.
- Oman: Grand Mufti Ahmed bin Hamad al-Khalili celebrated victories by Muslim candidates, saying "the success of some Muslim candidates in the U.S. midterm elections, despite the efforts of Zionists to prevent it, signals a shift in circumstances." He added, “we hope that those who have succeeded in these elections will conduct themselves in an exemplary manner, reflecting Islamic values and ideals."
- Qatar: Prime Minister Mohammed bin Abdulrahman Al Thani said that mediation with the U.S. and Iran was still ongoing, and that while polices in the U.S. might change with election results, "intentions" would remain the same. After Al Thani met with Trump less than a week after the election, Trump suggested the war with Iran was "effectively over."
- Saudi Arabia: The results sparked fears among Mohammed bin Salman and his government that the U.S. will refrain from further assisting Saudi Arabia in its conflict with the Houthi insurgency, and also stoked fears about the U.S. potentially upending a recent bilateral civilian nuclear accord, which omitted a provision barring enrichment of uranium by the Saudis.
- Syria: The government of Ahmed al-Sharaa was reported to be wary of favorable results for Democrats possibly leading to an end to the largely unconditional support Syria had enjoyed from the Trump administration following the fall of the Assad regime, with concerns about new congressional oversight, as well as possible demands to join the war in Yemen.
- United Arab Emirates: Several Emirati officials were quoted by Frederick Kempe via the Atlantic Council, with one official saying the elections demonstrated "American democracy's remarkable ability to self-correct in response to voter concerns", adding that what is concerning is the frequency of that "self-correction" given the dramatic foreign policy swings between administrations, while another official said it was "unfair" that he and other U.S. allies could not vote, given the consequences of the midterms will affect non-Americans almost everywhere.

=== Southeast Asia ===
- Indonesia: Airlangga Hartarto, the country's Coordinating Minister for Economic Affairs, said "we see that both Congress and the Senate are controlled by Democrats. This will certainly impact global economic and geopolitical policies."
- Malaysia: Prime Minister Anwar Ibrahim said that his government was monitoring potential developments on tariffs from the election, adding that on a personal note he welcomed the results, viewing them as a "positive signal" with the election of candidates who "oppose attacks and hostility toward Islam, as well as toward Iran".
- Myanmar: An opinion article in The Irrawaddy noted that several Republicans who had supported the National League for Democracy government in Myanmar either lost re-election or are set to retire, identifying Congressman Bill Huizenga in Michigan, whose House district contained a significant Burmese American community in Battle Creek, as one such advocate in particular, alongside Congresswoman Young Kim in California (Note: Lost re-election to fellow Republican Ken Calvert.) and Senator Mitch McConnell, who has had a decades-long correspondence with former State Counsellor Aung San Suu Kyi. The article stressed that supporters of Myanmar's pro-democracy opposition will have to find new advocates in the newly Democratic Congress.
- Philippines: Jose Manuel Romualdez, who has served as the Philippines ambassador to the U.S. since 2017, said that potential changes to immigration rules would "ease" fears of some Filipinos in the U.S., as he noted "Democrats have been pushing for a different approach."
- Singapore: In a fireside chat with the Institute of Singapore Chartered Accountants, former Minister of Foreign Affairs George Yeo said that he saw the U.S. midterms as a "positive signal", showing that extremist political forces had "receded" to some extent, and reducing risk of escalation between the U.S. and Iran. Yeo also commented on how he observed Americans viewing AI and data centers negatively, which he contrasted with more positive views held by people in China, suggesting the difference was due to China's more restrictive development of the technology.
- Thailand: Commerce Minister Suphajee Suthumpun said her initial assessment of the election results was that the U.S. may be more careful about introducing new trade policies and measures, with negotiations between the U.S. and Thailand on trade continuing.
- Vietnam: Ministry of Foreign Affairs spokesperson Phạm Thu Hằng said negotiations on trade between the U.S. and Vietnam would continue regardless of the results.

== Reactions in Europe ==
Reactions to the results across Europe were described as "feeling more than a little bit of schadenfreude" by Politico, with many political leaders celebrating the defeat faced by Trump and the Republican Party, while right-wing and far-right parties in Europe generally blamed the ongoing Iran war and the associated rising cost of living for the results.

=== British and Irish reactions ===
- Ireland: Taoiseach Micheál Martin cited the war in Iran as a factor in the results, saying "I’m not so sure that you can just neatly characterise the election as just one area around technology and oligarchs." Patricia Stephenson, the foreign affairs spokesperson for the Social Democrats, said the results will have "positive implications" across the world. In general, sources within the Irish government were noted to be taking a much warier view than Stephenson, worried Trump might grow more aggressive on the world stage.
- United Kingdom: In response to the midterms, Prime Minister Andy Burnham told BBC News that "I feel the world has an opportunity now to unite around the issue that is affecting us all, and that's the cost of living". Opposition leader Kemi Badenoch told Geordie Greig that Trump "deserved to be thrashed" and denounced his "dirty" style of politics. Reform UK leader Nigel Farage accused Trump of having "broke a promise" by launching the war on Iran and expressed concern that the President "will continue aggressively attacking Iran" following the election results. The Guardian also noted several British newspapers running front-page headlines about the results, with The Guardian itself running the headline "Trumped" on the day after the election, as the Daily Mail ran "MAGA turns on Trump."
- In Northern Ireland, Colum Eastwood, an MP from the Social Democratic and Labour Party who chairs the New Ireland Commission, suggested "there are many lessons" those in favor of a United Ireland could learn from the U.S. midterm elections, noting that Americans had rejected a "politics of division and hate", and that a message of "hope, positivity, and the chance of a better future" was one which should be replicated.
- Scotland: An article in The National Scot by Pat Kane, who formerly served as rector at the University of Glasgow, talked about the life of Greta Thunberg up through her appearance at COP 31 shortly after the midterms, with Kane comparing some of her earlier "highly moralistic" statements to those of "explicit Christian" James Talarico as well as Abdul El-Sayed, arguing that the Scottish independence movement needs to likewise not abandon idealism and "accelerate" its "moral ambition."

==== British Overseas Territories ====
- Bermuda: Companies headquartered in Bermuda had differing reactions in American stock markets, with insurance companies such as White Mountains Group seeing rallies, while shipping companies such as Teekay saw dips after the election, as reported by The Royal Gazette.
- Gibraltar: The Gibraltar Chronicle and Gibraltar Broadcasting Corporation focused on a group of fifteen Gibraltarians in the Advanced Leadership Foundation's Global Emerging Leaders Programme who were in DC at the time of election, with one participant describing the election as "a long, steady build that has been running in the background of everything for weeks" with the millions of people who voted early, and another saying "foreign policy makes headlines, but grocery prices make decisions."

=== NATO countries ===
- Albania: Opposition leader Sali Berisha said "the American people, fortunate to hold free and fair elections, voted for the candidates they consider and the policies they consider best," adding that he believes tariff policies, the war in Iran, and the blockade at the Strait of Hormuz were the causes of Republican losses.
- Belgium: Defence Minister Theo Francken made a post saying that "governing in the United States will be almost impossible in the coming years given the level of internal division and polarization. As a European politician I will look of course to trade policies, support to Ukraine and NATO."
- Croatia: Foreign and European Affairs Minister Gordan Grlić-Radman said "of course, election cycles cannot be above our relations, which are based on an alliance and a partnership", while adding that he does not expect changes in U.S. foreign policy since "President Trump still has an ongoing mandate."
- Czech Republic: After the results were announced, Prime Minister Andrej Babiš commented that the Democratic victory was "in accordance with predictions", and noted that the outcome will likely result in a political stalemate.
- Denmark: Foreign Minister Lars Løkke Rasmussen, who was at the election night party of Senator Jon Ossoff in Georgia as results were announced, commented that Republican candidates endorsed by Trump had been given a "proper slap on the wrist". Numerous other party leaders from across the Danish political spectrum also weighed in, all celebratory of the results, with Pelle Dragsted of the Red-Green Alliance saying "today we are seeing the end of the MAGA movement and Trump’s oligarchy", Henrik Dahl of the Liberal Alliance calling the election a "crushing defeat" for Vladimir Putin, and Inger Støjberg of the Denmark Democrats stating the MAGA movement had left a "trail of chaos in its wake", specifically noting the Greenland crisis.
- Estonia: Prime Minister Kristen Michal said "elections have consequence. So this is a good thing in democracy, that you have checks and balances", adding that the electoral shift could move the U.S. "to the better side, more value-based side" in the context of the war between Russia and Ukraine.
- France: Foreign Minister Jean-Noël Barrot declared that the election's results were "excellent news for American democracy". Economy Minister Roland Lescure noted Trump would be "quite weakened" domestically, but would still remain "unpredictable" and in charge of foreign policy. Jordan Bardella, president of the far-right National Rally, said "there is most certainly a link" between the results and the Iran war, suggesting Trump had strayed away from his first term agenda where "his political ambition was to withdraw the United States from major global conflicts."
- Finland: Mika Aaltola, a member of the European Parliament for Finland's governing National Coalition Party, said "voters have a habit of balancing power, and now [Trump]'s hands are more tied in domestic and foreign policy."
- Germany: Chancellor Friedrich Merz commented that Trump had governed without involving Congress through executive orders and would probably continue to do so. He believed that not much would change except the budget, which the Democrats would now be able to block from passing. Defense Minister Boris Pistorius echoed the guarded sentiment of Merz, saying "we will seek close contact with the Democrats, but we do not know what [Trump] will do after the election in the near future." Alice Weidel, co-leader of the far-right Alternative for Germany party said the results are largely due to Trump's broken promise "not to pursue an interventionist foreign policy".
- Greece: Government spokesperson Pavlos Marinakis said following the election that Greece–United States relations will remain strong regardless of the outcome, adding that Greek officials maintain good relations with lawmakers likely to "key" positions on congressional committees.
- Hungary: Balázs Orbán, who served as a political director for former Prime Minister Viktor Orbán (no relation), and currently as a member of the European Parliament for Hungary's Fidesz, suggested that the results should be interpreted as a "warning" for Prime Minister Péter Magyar and as well as Polish PM Donald Tusk, stating "the Western world is becoming increasingly difficult to govern" due to economic stagnation, the cost-of-living crisis, and "uncertainty" caused by wars.
- Iceland: In an interview with Bloomberg Television on November 6, Prime Minister Kristrún Frostadóttir referred to the midterm elections as a "domestic matter" for the U.S. and declined to comment on the results. She also stated that Iceland and the U.S. have a "tight knit" relationship, while adding that "you can put your foot down with your allies and tell them when they're off," referring to the Greenland crisis from earlier in the year.
- Italy: Prime Minister Giorgia Meloni said "nothing changes regarding the relationship between Italy and the United States", calling the U.S. a "fundamental ally", and also taking a swipe at the centre-left coalition, suggesting they will "by magic, rediscover" the U.S. is a "great ally" following the election. Matteo Salvini, leader of the far-right Lega Nord, commented as well saying "the hope is that this vote can represent an acceleration towards the end of the conflicts and a return to peace." Former Prime Ministers Giuseppe Conte and Matteo Renzi, current leaders of the populist Five Star Movement and liberal Italia Viva respectively, both posted celebratory remarks about the results, with Renzi in particular echoing Texas Senate candidate James Talarico's "David defeated Goliath" remark.
- Lithuania: Prime Minister Mindaugas Sinkevičius said "we certainly followed the elections," before going on to say "regardless of who is in the administration, we will work with an administration that has the trust of the [American] people."
- Luxembourg: Foreign Minister Xavier Bettel said Trump must now compromise, or risk becoming a "lame duck." He added that the result is a sign to Europe that it is worth fighting against extreme positions and discrimination.
- Netherlands: Dutch ambassador to the U.S. Birgitta Tazelaar specifically congratulated Peggy Flanagan on her victory in Minnesota's Senate race, posting a picture of when the two met at the 2024 Democratic National Convention.
- Norway: Prime Minister Jonas Gahr Støre said that the election represented a "change of course among American voters", and that "voices [were] now emerging in American politics that are closer to us than the president and the administration have stood for, for example on climate and environment, and in foreign policy and development aid policy." Foreign Minister Espen Barth Eide said that a majority of Americans "have had enough of MAGA and now want a different course".
- Poland: Prime Minister Donald Tusk stated "democracy won in America" after the election, adding that he hoped the result would help "stabilize" the situation in Eastern Europe. President Karol Nawrocki, noted to be an ally of Trump, made no comment on the results. Foreign Minister Radosław Sikorski, noted by Politico as a "regular" Trump antagonist, reshared a reply to Elon Musk on X saying "see, big man, politics is harder than you thought."
- Romania: President Nicușor Dan, who was meeting with American Undersecretary of Defense for Policy Elbridge Colby at the time of the election, said "I thanked [Colby] and the entire U.S. administration for their significant contribution to Romania's security, and reiterated that our country remains fully committed to the strategic partnership with the United States of America, as an indispensable and reliable ally." Andrei Muraru, Romania's Ambassador to the U.S., noted too that Romania has supporters in both the Republican and Democratic parties. Dan Dungaciu, vice-president of the far-right Alliance for the Union of Romanians, said "the news of Donald Trump's political death is 'greatly exaggerated.' Donald Trump does not automatically become a powerless president", adding "moreover, the idea that Republicans and Democrats have radically different options regarding America's involvement or presence in Europe is naive."
- Slovenia: Slovenian ambassador to the U.S. Iztok Mirošič congratulated three candidates with Slovenian heritage who won elections, including Amy Klobuchar in Minnesota, Tina Kotek in Oregon, and Paul Gosar in his re-election to Congress.
- Spain: Prime Minister Pedro Sánchez responded to the Democrats' victory in the US midterm elections, saying that American voters had rejected and voted "Against hate. Against machismo. Against climate denialism and against the privilege of the elites."
- Turkey: President Recep Tayyip Erdoğan stated it was too early to draw conclusions about the elections' impact on Turkey–U.S. relations, but wishes the results to be "beneficial" for Americans, and to contribute to "stability" in the neighborhood around Turkey.

=== Other countries in Europe ===
==== Central and Eastern Europe ====
- Austria: Foreign Minister Beate Meinl-Reisinger said that "independently of the election outcome" the security and prosperity of Austria and Europe must not depend on "how people in Kansas and Iowa vote", and noted that Austria is in the process of strengthening its own defenses and economic competitiveness.
- Belarus: President Alexander Lukashenko, asked about the midterms at the Minsk Conference on Eurasian Security held as the midterms were happening, said "I'm a Trumpist. I publicly support him in the elections."
- Liechtenstein: Prince Michael of Liechtenstein, owner of GIS Reports, published an opinion piece in his own platform calling the election "a blue wave, not a sea change", adding "the U.S. remains, at heart, a conservative, stable and resilient nation", while noting that Trump had alienated a significant share of conservative voters.
- Russia: Deputy Foreign Minister Sergei Ryabkov told RIA Novosti that "Let's wait for the final results. The Democratic Party leadership's approach to relations with Russia is sharply negative. There is nothing new about that". Kremlin Press Secretary Dmitry Peskov said "President Trump remains in office. We sincerely hope that he will continue his peacemaking efforts. There is already some groundwork in place. Another round of trilateral talks is coming up very soon. These include successful peacemaking and humanitarian initiatives. We hope that all of this will continue. Ultimately, this is an internal American matter".
- Serbia: Following the 2026 Serbian parliamentary election, held as many Americans were already voting early in the midterms, President Aleksandar Vučić suggested the same "American deep state" opposing Trump was responsible for him losing his bid to return to the office of Prime Minister, while political analyst Nikola Mikovic noted that the victorious Student List was likely to seek better relations with the U.S. in the event of Democratic victories in the midterms.
- Switzerland: Swiss political parties were said to not be expecting much, if any, change in dialogue with the U.S., with National Council member Damien Cottier saying "we have always managed to maintain good relations [with the U.S.] over the past 30 years. The quality of our dialogue remains strong. This stable relationship endures across election cycles," while adding that the elections were a "negative, strong, and forceful signal against Donald Trump’s policies."
- Ukraine: President Volodymyr Zelenskyy suggested chances of additional U.S. assistance for Ukraine in the Russo-Ukrainian war had increased with the Democrats' victories in congressional races, while adding that Ukraine needed to move toward consolidating bipartisan support from Americans.
- Vatican City: Pope Leo XIV declined to comment specifically on the outcome of the elections when asked, but stated he was "proud to be an American and to exercise the right" to vote.

==== South Caucasus ====
- Armenia: Foreign Minister Ararat Mirzoyan commented that he did not believe the Democrats' victory would hinder implementation of the Armenia–Azerbaijan peace agreement, which is to include construction by the U.S. of a route through the Zangezur corridor called the "Trump Route for International Peace and Prosperity," linking the Nakhchivan Autonomous Republic to the rest of Azerbaijan. The Armenian Weekly, a newspaper owned by the Armenian Revolutionary Federation, also ran an article noting that 90% of candidates endorsed by the Armenian National Committee of America had won their races, including notably Chris Pappas in New Hampshire's Senate race, whose opponent John E. Sununu was said to have ties to mining operations in Nagorno-Karabakh.
- Azerbaijan: The Azerbaijani Press Agency, a state-run news organization, said "the main message of this year's US elections is that people's daily well-being is one of the key factors determining political outcomes", adding "Azerbaijan builds its relations with the United States on the basis of long-term national interests. The political balance in Washington may change, but Azerbaijan's importance in terms of energy, transportation, and regional security remains and will grow even stronger."
- Georgia: Former President Mikheil Saakashvili, of the opposition United National Movement, called the results a "crushing defeat" for Republicans, driven by rising living costs and concerns about corruption, and happening despite financial backing from Elon Musk and other wealthy donors. Saakashvili added that the election offered a lesson for Georgia, arguing that public demand for change could develop into a powerful movement that no political barriers could stop.

== Reactions in Oceania ==
=== Compact of Free Association ===
The results prompted renewed attention to plans by the U.S. to secure access to seabed minerals across the Pacific, with Pacific Media Network speculating about greater congressional oversight on such activities, while also noting statements from the following Compact of Free Association countries:

- Marshall Islands: Climate Change Envoy Dr. Kathy Jetñil-Kijiner cautioned the U.S. military against using nuclear power for bases supporting mining activities, saying solar and wind are better "proven" alternatives.
- Micronesia: Joe Enlet, a former Consul General who served at Micronesia's consulate in Portland, Oregon, warned that US security plans must not override rights of traditional landowners, saying “strategic denial does not replace the free, prior and informed consent of traditional clan landholders."

=== South Pacific ===
- Australia: Prime Minister Anthony Albanese called the results "very significant", adding they were a key topic of discussion at the 2026 Commonwealth Heads of Government Meeting held at the same time as the election, and cited the Iran war as well as tariffs as reasons for Republican losses. Australian right-wing populist political party One Nation distanced itself from Trump following the election, removing or editing pages that had referenced Trump or compared its platform to the Trump administration's policies.
- Fiji: An article in The Fiji Times noted that Democrats will now be able to investigate the Epstein files as well as The Trump Organization, while also stating on Fiji specifically that "Democrats are unlikely to abandon America’s regional security interests, given bipartisan support for maintaining an American presence in the Pacific. However, congressional control could introduce greater scrutiny of how that strategy is implemented."
- New Zealand: Simon Bridges, former leader of the New Zealand National Party from 2018 to 2020 who now heads the Auckland Business Chamber, commented that the midterm results could boost the local economy by spelling the end of the Iran war and bringing down the price of oil, as he also blamed Trump's "liberation day" tariffs for New Zealand's ongoing economic woes.
- Samoa: Following the midterms, U.S. Health and Human Services Secretary Robert F. Kennedy Jr. faced renewed scrutiny over a 2019 trip he made to Samoa, where a letter he wrote to then-Prime Minister Tuilaʻepa Saʻilele Malielegaoi suggested he had made the trip to investigate the country's use of MMR vaccines, while he was also reported to have met with local anti-vaccine activists. Later in 2019, Samoa faced a deadly measles outbreak blamed on low vaccination rates, which public health experts suggested was more difficult to control due to anti-vaccine sentiment. Former Prime Minister Fiamē Naomi Mataʻafa (Note: Succeeded Malielegaoi in the office in 2021.) has criticized Kennedy for his alleged role in the outbreak, while the Pacific Media Network also suggested the incoming Democratic Congress planned to include Kennedy's in among its investigations into the Trump administration, with Senators Ron Wyden and Angela Alsobrooks already asking the Children's Health Defense to hand over documents related to the trip.
- Tonga: Reactions focused on Doug Fiefia, a Tongan American who was elected in Utah as the first State Senator of Tongan descent in any U.S. state. A member of the Republican Party, Fiefia described the midterm results for his party as a "bloodbath", as he also defended a near-total travel ban on Tonga which has been in place since January 2026.

== Reactions by international organizations ==
- European Union: Christel Schaldemose, the Vice-President of the European Parliament, said that the results left her "cautiously" optimistic, suggesting they could benefit the "support for Ukraine, the green transition, and relations with the rest of the world", while adding that the EU must continue the course of "standing on its own two feet". Bernd Lange, a MEP who heads the European Parliament Committee on International Trade, called the results a "crushing blow to Trump and his policies" and a "major victory for American democracy," while adding "Trump only cares about Trump. Now he's paying the price for it." He went on suggesting a "weakened" Trump could grow "aggressive and unpredictable," stressing the need for the EU to be able to "act independently and defend its interests," though also noting that the transatlantic partnership still matters.
- Renew Europe, a liberal political group in the European Parliament, issued a statement congratulating Democrats on their victory and stating "this change of majority in Congress should open a new chapter in relations between the European Union and the United States."
- NATO: Secretary General Mark Rutte said on Dutch talk show Pauw & Witteman that he had contacted Trump and told him to "keep his chin up" following the midterm elections.
- United Nations: UN spokesperson Stéphane Dujarric congratulated Americans for turning out in "large numbers", while noting that the UN's point of contact with the U.S. remains with the executive branch.

== See also ==
- American expansionism under Donald Trump
- Tariffs in the second Trump administration
- Travel bans under the Trump administrations
- International reactions to the 2026 United States intervention in Venezuela
- International reactions to the 2016 United States presidential election
- 2026 United States elections#Domestic reactions
