= Manjur Ahmed Chowdhury =

Bangladeshi zoologist, entomologist and activist

Manjur Ahmed Chowdhury is a Bangladeshi zoologist, entomologist, and rights activists. He is the former chairman of the National River Conservation Commission. He is the chairman of the Centre for Governance Studies.

== Early life ==
Chowdhury was born in Datta Para, Shibchar Upazila, Madaripur District. He graduated from Dhaka College. He completed his undergrad in Zoology and masters in Entomology from the University of Dhaka. He conducted research at the Bangladesh Atomic Energy Commission. He completed his PhD at the University of Georgia.

== Career ==
Chowdhury joined the Bangladesh Atomic Energy Commission as a scientific officer. He was a fellow at the International Atomic Energy Agency. In 1989, he returned to Bangladesh and launched SAFEWAY, a pest control company. He worked at University of Dhaka, and Jahangirnagar University. In 2005, he lived in New York City.

Chowdhury was the President of Zoological Society of Bangladesh. He was the Chairman of Al-Helal Printing and Publishers Limited, which published the now defunct The Bangladesh Observer, which was the oldest English language newspaper at the time of its closing in 2010.

In February 2022, Chowdhury, was appointed chairman of National River Conservation Commission. In September 2023, Chowdhury said interference from the government and lack of cooperation was making the commission ineffective. Chowdhury blamed Dipu Moni, Minister of Education and member of parliament, for getting the Chandpur District Commissioner and a Hilsa fish researcher removed. He called for the jailing of Atiqul Islam, Mayor of North Dhaka City, and Taqsem A Khan, managing director of Dhaka WASA, for failing in their duties to protect rivers. He also criticized the budget of 50 million BDT as being insufficient. On 18 October 2023, the government of Bangladesh removed him citing "public interest". The removal was criticized by Transparency International Bangladesh saying it contradicted governments commitment to protect rivers. The Daily Star wrote a critical editorial against his removal.
