= Kazi Reazul Hoque =

Bangladeshi civil servant

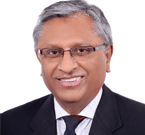
- Education: University of Dhaka; Asian Institute of Technology; International Law Institute; University of Birmingham
- Occupation: Civil servant

Kazi Reazul Hoque is a retired secretary and former chairman of the National Human Rights Commission of Bangladesh with the rank and status of Appellate Division judge.

== Early life ==
Hoque completed his master's degree at the University of Dhaka. He studied at the Asia Institute of Technology, National School of Government, International Law Institute, and University of Birmingham.

== Career ==
In 1973, Hoque joined Bangladesh Civil Service.

As Deputy Commissioner of Khulna District, Hoque worked to reclaim the home of the father in law of Rabindranath Tagore from illegal occupiers. He built a monument to the Gallamari Mass Grave, from the Bangladesh Liberation War, in Khulna.

Hoque was the secretary of the Bangladesh National Commission for UNESCO. He worked on the Ektee Bari Ektee Khamar project of Prime Minister Sheikh Hasina. He worked for the Palli Daridro Bimochon Foundation. Hoque retired from the Bangladesh Civil Service in 2006. He served as the director of the Legal Education and Training Institute of the Bangladesh Bar Council.

From 2010 to 2016, Hoque was a member of the National Human Rights Commission of Bangladesh. In August 2016, he replaced Professor Mizanur Rahman as chairman of the National Human Rights Commission of Bangladesh following recommendation of a panel led by Speaker Shirin Sharmin Chaudhury. He called for implementation of the existing laws to stop rapes in Bangladesh. Lawyer Yunus Ali Akhand filed a petition with the High Court Division against his appointment arguing he had already served two terms as member of the commission and continuation would be a violation of the National Human Rights Commission Act, 2009. Justices Md. Rezaul Haque and Mohammad Ullah sought an explanation from the government why the appointment should not be declared illegal. He met Santals community members who had been evicted from their homes in Gaibandha District in December 2016.

In November 2018, Hoque warned the government to remain alert so that no one could use the Rohingya refugees for violence before the general election. He called for research into why there was a massive vote difference between the 11th and 12th national elections. He blamed the police for producing flawed reports which allowed human traffickers to escape imprisonment. He wrote to Home Minister Asaduzzaman Khan Kamal to ensure human rights were respected during the anti-narcotic drives. He called for proper investigation into the Killing of Ekramul Haque by security personnel. He called for improvements to the National Human Rights Commission Act, 2009 and bemoaned the lack of adequate support staff.

Hoque was critical of comments made by Priya Saha to President Donald J. Trump on the state of minority rights in Bangladesh while defending the record of the Sheikh Hasina led Awami League government on minority rights. He called for actions against enforced disappearance and extrajudicial killings. He accused the government of Myanmar of deceiving Bangladesh on the issue of repatriating the Rohingya refugees in Bangladesh and describing its actions against the Rohingya people as genocide. He blamed the Murder of Nusrat Jahan Rafi on negligence by police, civil administration, and management of her madrassah. On 1 July 2019, Hoque retired from the National Human Rights Commission of Bangladesh at the age of 70. Nasima Begum succeeded him as chairman of the commission.

Hoque founded Khulna Children Hospital and Khulna Foundation.
