= Nasima Begum =

Nasima Begum is a retired secretary and former chairman of the National Human Rights Commission of Bangladesh, with the rank of a judge of the Appellate Division of the Bangladesh Supreme Court. She was the first woman to head the commission. She was a member of the Bangladesh Planning Commission.

== Early life ==
Begum was born in 1960 in Munshiganj District, East Pakistan, Pakistan. She did her bachelor's degree and masters in Islamic history and culture at the University of Dhaka.

== Career ==
Begum joined the admin cadre of Bangladesh Civil Service in 1983.

In 2003, Begum was the deputy secretary of the Ministry of Liberation War Affairs. She was the secretary of the Bangladesh Freedom Fighter Welfare Trust. She served in the Local Government Division, Ministry of Establishment, and the Ministry of Public Administration. As part of the Geological Survey of Bangladesh, she was part of the investigation committee that examined the impact of the 2004 Indian Ocean earthquake and tsunami on Bangladesh.

Begum was promoted to joined secretary in 2009 and appointed to the Ministry of Social Welfare. In 2012, she was made the director general of Department of Social Services.

In 2017, Begum was the joint secretary of the Ministry of Textiles and Jute. She was the Additional Secretary to the Cabinet Division. In January 2019, Begum retired as the senior secretary of the Ministry of Women and Children Affairs. She gave Prime Minister Sheikh Hasina a UNICEF award for her contribution to ending child marriage.

In September 2019, Begum was appointed chairman of the National Human Rights Commission of Bangladesh replacing Kazi Reazul Hoque. She was given the rank and status of a judge of the Appellate Division of the Bangladesh Supreme Court. She identified legal restrictions on the commission preventing investigation of law enforcement personnel as a drawback. She established an online complaint system for her commission. She was replaced by Kamal Uddin Ahmed as chairperson of the National Human Rights Commission of Bangladesh. Civil society members criticised the appointment of retired civil servants like Begum and Uddin as chairperson of the National Human Rights Commission of Bangladesh.

In 2022, Begum was a member of the Bangladesh Planning Commission. After the fall of the Sheikh Hasina led Awami League government, a murder case was filed against Begum by Bangladesh Nationalist Party politician Mohammad Zaman Hossain Khan over the death of a protestor in July 2024.

== Personal life ==
Begum is married to M Faizur Rahman Chowdhury, secretary of the Posts and Telecommunications Division.
