= Banchita Chakma =

Banchita Chakma is a Bangladeshi indigenous rights activist and former commissioner of the National Human Rights Commission of Bangladesh. She is the former principal of Rangamati Govt. College.

== Early life ==
Chakma completed her bachelor's and master's in botany at the University of Dhaka in 1978.

== Career ==
Chakma joined the Bangladesh Civil Service in the education cadre.

While Chakma served as the principal of Rangamati Govt. College, there was a clash between Bengali and non-Bengali students in 2012. 50 people were injured in the riots that followed in Rangamati. In August 2016, she was appointed one of five members of the National Human Rights Commission of Bangladesh led by Kazi Reazul Hoque. She was a senate member of the National University of Bangladesh. She was the Commissioner of the District Rover Scout in Rangamati.

Chakma led a three-member investigation committee of the National Human Rights Commission into the death of Indigenous grade 12 student Romel Chakma in Bangladesh Army custody in 2017. She wrote to the Ministry of Defence seeking an explanation from the Bangladesh Army. She led another three-member committee looking into arson attacks on Indigenous villages in Langadu Upazila in June 2017. Her report stated the security services could have stopped the attacks if they had wanted to and the local civil administration provided support to the attackers.

Chakma went to Rangamati after two Marma sisters were raped by security personnel. The police guarded the girl's room and did not let them speak to journalists or human rights activists. She called police action a kind of human rights violation. She investigated the rape of a Chakma girl by Bangladesh Ansar. Security forces also attacked Rani Yan Yan, queen of the Chaka people, when she went to visit the girls in the hospital. The girls' parents were staying at the house of a local Awami League leader for their safety.

Chakma has been critical of taxpayer-funded foreign trips by the staff of Chittagong Hill Tracts Regional Council, Khagrachhari Hill District Council, Bandarban Hill District Council, Rangamati Hill District Council, and Ministry of Chittagong Hill Tracts Affairs for training. She described them as pleasure trips and a misuse of funds. She has also been critical of a provision of the National Human Rights Commission which prevents it from investigating human rights abuses by security forces.

In August 2021, Chakma was appointed rector of the Banophool Adibashi Green Heart College. She signed a statement asking the government of Bangladesh to stop its collective punishment of the Bawm people for the actions of the Kuki-Chin National Front.
