= Mohammad Ullah (judge) =

Bangladeshi Judge

Justice of the High Court Division of Bangladesh
- Incumbent
- Assumed office 30 April 1994

Personal details
- Born: March 18, 1970 (age 56)
- Profession: Justice

Mohammad Ullah is a justice of the High Court Division of the Bangladesh Supreme Court.

== Early life ==
Mohammad was born on 18 March 1970. He has bachelor's and master's degrees in law.

== Career ==
Mohammad became a lawyer in the District Courts on 30 April 1994. He started practicing in the High Court on 12 August 1995.

Mohammad became a lawyer in the Appellate Division of the Supreme Court of Bangladesh on 13 January 2011. On 20 October, he was appointed an additional judge of the High Court Division.

On 7 October 2013, Mohammad was made a permanent judge of the High Court Division.

In July 2015, Mohammad and Justice Farid Ahmed denied bail to a British-Bangladeshi jihadist who came to Bangladesh to recruit for the Islamic State. In September Mohammad and Justice Shamim Hasnain blocked the government attempt to impose value added tax on English medium schools in Bangladesh.

Mohammad and Justice Quazi Reza-Ul Hoque ordered the government to collect land development tax at enhanced rates for one year following a petition from a farmer in Barisal. Mohammad and Justice Quazi Reza-Ul Hoque ordered the Inspector General of Police to transfer out assistant superintendent of police Saiful Islam for torturing a prisoner in custody in Patuakhali District. Ullah and Justice Quazi Reza-Ul Hoque banned pneumatic horns in Bangladesh in November 2017 to limit sound pollution. On 13 December 2017, Justice Quazi Reza-Ul Hoque and Mohammad censured upazila nirbahi officer and executive magistrate Mohammad Nooruzzaman of Lakshmipur Sadar Upazila and additional deputy commissioner Sheikh Morshedul Islam of Lakshmipur District for abuse of power.

In December 2019, Mohammad and Justice Gobinda Chandra Tagore criticized Dhaka Water Supply and Sewerage Authority for its failure to stop all lines dumping raw sewage in the Buriganga River according to the 2011 High Court verdict. It cautioned the managing director of the authority, Taqsem A Khan.

Mohammad and Justice Gobinda Chandra Thakur ordered the Department of Immigration and Passports to issue a passport to student activist Nurul Haque Nur in March 2020.
