= Akhter Hussain (professor) =

Professor Akhter Hussain
- আখতার হুসেন
- Education: University of Dhaka, Panjab University
- Occupations: Academic, consultant
- Employer: University of Dhaka
- Known for: Chair of Public Administration Department, University of Dhaka; academic advisor to the National Defense College

Akhter Hussain is an academic and former member of the National Human Rights Commission of Bangladesh. He is a former Professor and the Chairman of the Department of Public Administration at the University of Dhaka. He was an Academic Advisor to the National Defense College.

== Early life and education ==
Hussain completed his undergraduate degree in Public Administration from the University of Dhaka in 1981. He earned his PhD in 1986 from Panjab University, India.

== Career ==
Hussain has served as a faculty member of the Department of Public Administration at the University of Dhaka. He worked for three years as a Program Director and Specialist at the Continuing Education Center of the Asian Institute of Technology in Thailand.

Hussain has worked as a consultant for numerous international organizations, including The Asia Foundation, the United States Agency for International Development, the World Bank, the Department for International Development, the Asian Development Bank, the Danish International Development Agency, the Swedish International Development Cooperation Agency, the Swiss Agency for Development and Cooperation, the International Labour Organization, the United Nations Office for Project Services, United Nations Human Settlements Programme, the European Commission, and the United Nations Development Programme (UNDP). Hussain is a life member of the Indian Institute of Public Administration in New Delhi, India.

Hussain was the chairperson of the Department of Public Administration at the University of Dhaka.

On 2 August 2016, Hossain was appointed a member of the National Human Rights Commission of Bangladesh. He served as a member of the commission till 2 August 2019.
