= National Human Rights Commission of Bangladesh =

Bangladeshi organization

National Human Rights Commission জাতীয় মানবাধিকার কমিশন
- Logo of NHRC
- Motto: Human Rights for All, Everywhere, Equally মানবাধিকার সবার জন্য, সর্বত্র, সমানভাবে

Agency overview
- Formed: 2007

Jurisdictional structure
- National agency: Bangladesh
- Operations jurisdiction: Bangladesh

Operational structure
- Headquarters: Dhaka, Bangladesh
- Statutory Independent Institution of the states: NHRC

Website
- nhrc.org.bd

The National Human Rights Commission (NHRC) of Bangladesh is an autonomous public body established in 2007 to advocate for and protect human rights.

== History ==
National Human Rights Commission was established on 9 December 2007 by the Caretaker government of Bangladesh. The organization was constituted under the provisions of the National Human Rights Commission Ordinance. It was reestablished by the National Human Rights Commission Act, 2009 after the original ordinance lapsed. Then it was reconstituted in 2009 as a national advocacy institution for human rights promotion and protection. It is committed to the accomplishment of human rights in a broader sense, including dignity, worth and freedom of every human being, as enshrined in the Constitution of the People's Republic of Bangladesh and different international human rights conventions and treaties to which Bangladesh is a signatory. Consecutive administrations in Bangladesh have developed policies aimed at empowering women, incorporating this objective into their broader agendas while honoring their commitments to global development objectives.

In 2025, under the Interim government of Muhammad Yunus, an ordinance was drafted which gives the organization new duties and powers such as investigation, prosecution, legal representation of complainants. The new ordinance allows the organization to arrest and investigate suspects regardless of rank or political position independently.

== Emergence as a powerful organization ==
The NHRC was legally banned from investigating members of law enforcement since 2009, which was removed under the Interim government of Muhammad Yunus through a new ordinance in 2025.

The ordinance also gives the organization new powers such as visiting and searching facilities to identify secret detention centres. It can also issue warrants to inspect prisons or other premises where enforced disappearances could have taken place.

The rights commission can also authorise law enforcers to make arrests with the ordinance stating investigating officers cannot be part of the organization that is being investigated.

These changes have been considered revolutionary to tackle human rights abuses.

== Organization ==
The President of Bangladesh appoints the chairman and members of the commission based on the recommendations of a seven-member selection committee headed by the Speaker of Parliament.

Former chairman and members
Name	Designation	Term	Reference
Kamal Uddin Ahmed	Chairman	8 December 2022 – 7 November 2024	
Nasima Begum	Chairman	22 September 2019 – 23 September 2022	
Md Nazrul Islam	Acting Chairman	2 July 2019 – 6 August 2019	
Kazi Reazul Hoque	Chairman	2 August 2016 – 1 July 2019	
Mizanur Rahman	Chairman	23 June 2010 – 23 June 2016	
Md Nazrul Islam	Full Time Member	August 2016 – 6 August 2019	
Kazi Reazul Hoque	Full Time Member	June 2010 – 23 June 2016	
Nurun Naher Osmani	Member	2 August 2016 – 2 August 2019	
Enamul Hoque Chowdhury	Member	2 August 2016 – 2 August 2019	
Akhter Hussain	Member	2 August 2016 – 2 August 2019	
Meghna Guhathakurta	Member	2 August 2016 – 2 August 2019	
Banchita Chakma	Member	2 August 2016 – 8 August 2019	
Mahfuza Khanam	Member	23 June 2010 – 23 June 2016	
Selina Hossain	Member	23 June 2010 – 23 June 2016	
Aroma Datta	Member	23 June 2010 – 23 June 2016	
Fauzia Karim Firoz	Member	23 June 2010 – 23 June 2016	
Nirupa Dewan	Member	23 June 2010 – 23 June 2016	

== Activities ==
- It lodged complaints against Border Security Forces of India over Felani Killing with the National Human Rights Commission of India.
- It holds surveys regarding perceptions about human rights in Bangladesh.
- It campaigns against human rights abuses and extrajudicial killings in Bangladesh.
