= Gobinda Chandra Tagore =

Bangladeshi judge

The Honourable Gobinda Chandra Tagore
- গোবিন্দ চন্দ্র ঠাকুর

Justice of the High Court Division of Bangladesh
- Incumbent
- Assumed office 18 April 2010

Personal details
- Born: 15 May 1963 (age 63)
- Parent(s): Late Gurubar Tagore(father); Madhumala Tagore(mother)
- Education: University of Dhaka
- Profession: Judge

Gobinda Chandra Tagore (born 15 May 1963) is a justice of the High Court Division Supreme Court of Bangladesh. He was appointed in 2009.

== Early life ==
Tagore was born in Bengali Hindu Family on 15 May 1963 in Kadambari, Madaripur District, East Pakistan, Pakistan. He completed his master's degree in journalism and law degree from the University of Dhaka.

== Career ==
On 30 April 1994, Tagore joined the Dhaka District Courts as a lawyer.

Tagore became a lawyer of the High Court Division of Bangladesh Supreme Court on 29 September 1996.

On 13 December 2009, Tagore became a lawyer of the Appellate Division of Bangladesh Supreme Court.

On 18 April 2010, Tagore was appointed additional judge of the High Court Division. In July 2010, Tagore and Judges Syed Mahmud Hossain issued a verdict which made it illegal to implement punishment given through fatwa.

In March 2011, Tagore and Justices Mohammad Momtaz Uddin Ahmed dismissed a petition filed by Muhammad Yunus, Nobel Peace Prize winner and founder of Grameen Bank, that challenged his removal from the post of chairman of Grameen Bank. Tagore and Justice AHM Shamshuddin Chowdhury Manik attacked statements of officer-in-charge of Khilgaon Police Station Helal Uddin accusing him of lying and threatening to imprison him over the detention of University of Dhaka student Abdul Kader. The OC was later imprisoned for torturing the student in custody. In August 2011, Tagore and Justice AHM Shamsuddin Chowdhury Manik issued an order making the attempt by Chittagong City Corporation to turn Laldighi into a swimming pool illegal.

Tagore was made a permanent judge of the High Court Division on 15 April 2012.

In September 2016, a human chain was formed on Dhaka-Barisal highway protesting Justice Gobinda Chandra Tagore. Lawyers, Gazi Mostaque Ahmed and Istiaque Ahmed, filed a petition with the high court regarding the human chain. The protestors were protesting the filling of case against Chairperson of Aruakandi Union Parishad Bidhan Bishwas for cutting government trees. The protestors said the case was filed at the instigation of Tagore. Judges Quazi Reza-Ul Hoque and JN Deb Choudhury of the High Court Division called the human chain illegal and an affront to the dignity of the court. It sought details of the protestors from the administration and directed them to provide safety to Tagore's family in the area.

Tagore and Justice Mohammad Ullah issued a verdict in January 2019 clearing the way for Dhaka North City Corporation elections to be held. In December 2019, Tagore and Justice Mohammad Ullah ordered the Department of Environment to close all the illegal establishments on the Buriganga River.

Tagore and Justice Mohammad Ullah ordered the government to issue passport Nurul Haque Nur, former vice-president of Dhaka University Central Students' Union on 5 March 2020.
