= Md. Akram-Al-Hossain =

Bangladeshi politician

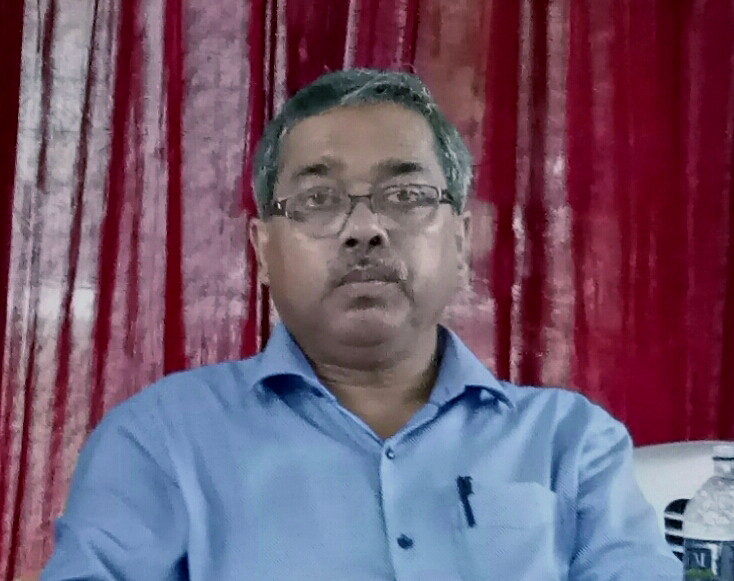
- Md. Akram-Al-Hossain in 2019

Senior Secretary of Ministry of Primary and Mass Education
- In office 24 September 2018 – 31 October 2020

Chairman of Bangladesh Petroleum Corporation
- In office 9 May 2018 – 23 September 2018

Personal details
- Born: 1 October 1961 (age 64) Hazipur, Magura Sadar, Magura
- Spouse: Khandakar Ferdousi Aktar
- Children: 3

Md. Akram-Al-Hossain was a Bangladeshi civil servant who is the Chairman of Palli Sanchay Bank. He was the Senior Secretary of the Ministry of Primary and Mass Education. He also was Chairman of Bangladesh Petroleum Corporation.

== Biography ==
Md. Akram-Al-Hossain was born on 1 November 1961 in Hazipur Village of Magura District's Magura Sadar Upazila. He passed MA from Rajshahi University in economics. He joined as an Assistant Commissioner and Magistrate in 1988 He served as Assistant Commissioner (Land), Nezarat Deputy Collector, Land Acquisition Officer and Local Executive Officer of Dhaka City Corporation. He was the Assistant Private Secretary and Private Secretary of the Environment and Forest Minister. He also served as Deputy Secretary of Finance Division, Private Secretary to the Deputy leader of Jatiyo Sangsad and Joint Secretary of Local Government Division. He served as Additional Secretary of Ministry of Primary and Mass Education from 2016 to 8 May 2018. Then, he was promoted as Secretary In-Charge and was Chairman of Bangladesh Petroleum Corporation from 9 May 2018 to 23 September 2018. On October 31, 2020 he retires as Senior secretary.

== Personal life ==
Md. Akram-Al-Hossain married to Khandakar Ferdousi Aktar. They have one son and two daughters.
