= Nurun Naher Osmani =

Bangladeshi judge

- নূরুন নাহার ওসমানী
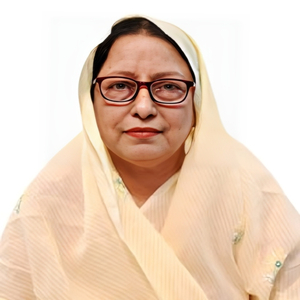
- Education: LLB, LLM
- Alma mater: University of Dhaka
- Occupation: Judge
- Known for: Senior District and Sessions Judge, Member of Labor Appellate Tribunal, Member of National Human Rights Commission Bangladesh

Nurun Naher Osmani is a retired Bangladeshi judge and former Senior District and Sessions Judge. She served as a Member of the Labour Appellate Tribunal and the National Human Rights Commission of Bangladesh.

== Early life ==
Nurun Naher Osmani was born on September 30, 1956 in Dhaka to Abdus Satter Osmani and Mahmuda Khatun. She hails from Noagaon, Sarail Upazila, Brahmanbaria District

== Education and early career ==
Osmani earned her bachelor's and master's degrees in law at the University of Dhaka.

== Career ==
Osmani joined the Bangladesh Judicial Service in 1983 as an Assistant Judge. She held positions including Senior Assistant Judge, Sub Judge (now known as Joint District and Sessions Judge), and Additional District and Sessions Judge.

In 2001, Osmani was promoted to the position of District and Sessions Judge. She served from 2001 to 2002 in Dhaka as a Member (District Judge) of the Court of Settlement. She served as a Special Judge (District Judge) from 2002 to 2004 in Tangail District. She served as District and Sessions Judge from 2004 to 2008 in Bagerhat District, and from 2008 to 2012 in Pabna District. From 2012 to 2015, she served as a Member (Senior District Judge) of the Labour Appellate Tribunal.

Osmani served three consecutive terms from 2013 to 2015 as the President of the Bangladesh Women Judges’ Association. After her retirement, she served as a resource person on labor law at the Judicial Administration Training Institute. On 2 August 2016, she was appointed a commissioner of the National Human Rights Commission Bangladesh. In 2017, she investigated the rape of two university students at a hotel in Banani. In 2018, she led the fact-finding committee of the National Human Rights Commission Bangladesh to probe the 7 murder incident taken place in Khagrachari District. She served as a commissioner till August 2019.

Osmani served as the Vice-President of the Brahmanbaria District Association and two times as General Secretary of the Retired Judges’ Welfare Association. She is a member of the Bangladesh Law Association and has also served there as Vice-President. At present, she is serving as an Adviser of the Retired Judges' Welfare Association and the Brahmanbaria District Association.

She is currently practicing as an Advocate of the Supreme Court of Bangladesh. She has also served as an Arbitrator in different Arbitration cases.

== Personal life ==
Osmani married A. K. M. Sayeed Khan, a freedom fighter and businessman. She has two sons.
