= Md Nazrul Islam (secretary) =

- মোঃ নজরুল ইসলাম
- Education: University of Chittagong
- Occupation: Civil servant
- Known for: Secretary (Coordination and Reforms), Cabinet Division; Member, National Human Rights Commission of Bangladesh

Md Nazrul Islam is a retired Bangladeshi civil servant and policy reform expert. He is the former acting chairperson and member of the National Human Rights Commission of Bangladesh. He previously served as Secretary (Coordination and Reforms) in the Cabinet Division of the Government of Bangladesh.

== Early life and education ==
Islam completed his Bachelor's and Master's degrees in Political Science from the University of Chittagong in 1977 and 1978, respectively.

== Career ==
Islam joined the Bangladesh Civil Service in the Administration cadre in 1983. He held several administrative roles during his career, including Magistrate, Upazila Nirbahi Officer, Land Settlement Officer, and Additional Deputy Commissioner. He later worked in the Ministry of Education as the Project Director of a large education project supported by multiple development partners. The project aimed to improve access to quality education and promote the use of digital tools in schools.

In 2014, Islam was appointed the Secretary (Coordination and Reforms) in the Cabinet Division. He was involved in efforts to reform public administration in line with the national goal of building a more inclusive and citizen-focused government.

Islam was involved in the creation and rollout of the National Integrity Strategy, which aims to reduce corruption and improve ethical standards in public service. He also chaired the inter-ministerial working group on the implementation of the Right to Information Act and helped promote access to public information. In addition, he introduced updated versions of Citizen’s Charters and launched an online Grievance Redress System to make it easier for citizens to report problems and receive solutions.

In August 2016, Islam was appointed commissioner of the National Human Rights Commission. He interrogated the owner and manager of Raintree Hotel after an incident of rape at the hotel as head of the commission's fact-finding team. From 2 July 2019 to 6 August 2019, he served as the acting chairman of the National Human Rights Commission.

In 2020, Islam joined Vital Strategies as the country director for Bangladesh. After the fall of the Sheikh Hasina led Awami League government, he was sued in a murder case along with 53 former secretaries of the government of Bangladesh.
