= Palli Sanchay Bank =

Bank of Bangladesh

- Industry: Banking
- Founded: 2 July 2014 and Dhaka, Bangladesh
- Headquarters: Dhaka, Bangladesh
- Key people: Abdul Khaleque, Ex-secretary (chairman); Salma Banu (managing director)
- Products: Banking services Consumer Banking; Corporate Banking; Investment Banking
- Net income: ▲
- Website: www.pallisanchaybank.gov.bd

Palli Sanchay Bank (Bengali: পল্লী সঞ্চয় ব্যাংক), Rural Savings Bank, is a state owned bank in Bangladesh. Abdul Khaleque, Ex-secretary is the chairman of the bank. Salma Banu is the managing director of the bank.

== History ==
On 2 July 2014, the Government of Bangladesh passed the Palli Sanchay Act 2014 to form the Palli Sanchay Bank. The bank was modeled after Grameen Bank, which was founded by Muhammad Yunus. According to the act, the government of Bangladesh would own 51 percent of the shares and members of Ektee Bari Ektee Khamar project (One House, One Farm project) would own rest of the shares. The bank would start with 10 billion taka authorised capital and 2 billion taka paid-up capital. The proposal for the bank was opposed by Bangladesh Bank and Bank and Financial Institutions Division of the Ministry of Finance. They recommended that instead of a bank, a financial institute be created. They believed that bank would fail to do its purpose like other specialised banks. The move to create the bank was initially opposed by the Ministry of Finance. The government promised to match deposits after two years. The bank started operating on 1 July 2021 after Ektee Bari Ektee Khamar project closed on 30 June 2021. There are more than 120 thousand rural cooperatives societies linked to the bank.

In 2018, the Palli Sanchay Bank announced plans to open branches in 462 Upazila (sub-district) of Bangladesh, having opened branches in 406 Upazilas by February 2018. In 2020, the bank introduced Grain Stock Loan to provide finance to farmers facing difficulty in selling their produce during the COVID-19 pandemic in Bangladesh. The loans considers grain stock as collateral.

Palli Sanchay Bank had 34.45 billion taka in 2021 which was a decrease of 2.74 billion taka from 37.19 billion taka in 2020. It has deposited 3.04 billion taka with the Bangladesh Commerce Bank Limited. An audit by Bangladesh Bank found evidence of loan forgery and embezzlement. On 14 September, Khondokar Ataur Rahman was appointed managing director of Palli Sanchay Bank.

== Board of directors ==
Name	Position	Reference
Md. Akram-al-Hossein	Chairman	
Md. Saheed Ali	Director	
Md . Haroon Or Rashid Mollah	Director	
Chandan Kumar Dey	Director	
Mohammad Mohiuddin	Director	
Mahtab Jabin	Director	
Md Yunus Bhuiyan	Director	
Golam Sarwar	Director	
Khandaker Ataur Rahman	Managing Director	
