= Kamal Uddin Ahmed (government official) =

Bangladeshi government official

Chairman National Human Rights Commission
- In office 8 December 2022 – 7 November 2024
- Appointed by: President of Bangladesh
- President: Mohammed Shahabuddin
- Preceded by: Nasima Begum

Full time Member National Human Rights Commission
- In office 22 September 2019 – 23 September 2022
- Preceded by: Md. Nazrul Islam
- Succeeded by: Selim Reza

Secretary Ministry of Home Affairs
- In office 14 February 2017 – 27 August 2017
- Prime Minister: Sheikh Hasina
- Preceded by: Dr. Md Mozammel Haque Khan
- Succeeded by: Mostafa Kamal Uddin

Personal details
- Born: 10 June 1959 (age 67)
- Education: University of Dhaka

Kamal Uddin Ahmed is a Bangladeshi retired government official who was the Chairman of the National Human Rights Commission. He is the former Secretary of Ministry of Home Affairs and Ministry of Environment, Forest and Climate Change.

== Career ==
Kamal Uddin Ahmed joined BCS Administration cadre in 1986 as Assistant Commissioner.

He served as the deputy secretary of the Ministry of Science and Technology.

Ahmed was promoted to joint secretary from deputy secretary. In 2010, Ahmed placed Non-Governmental Organizations in the Chittagong Hill Tracts under government surveillance. Ahmed as Additional Secretary of Ministry of Home Affairs oversaw the joint survey with India of border lands to solve the adversely possessed land issue between the two countries. He led a 12-member Bangladeshi delegation in a meeting with an Indian delegation following the Border shooting of Felani Khatun.

In 2013, Ahmed was the additional secretary of the Ministry of Posts, Telecommunications and Information Technology.

Ahmed was transferred from his post of the Additional Secretary to the acting secretary of Ministry of Environment, Forest and Climate Change in January 2015.

In December 2016, Ahmed was appointed the Secretary of the Ministry of Home Affairs replacing Mozammel Haque Khan. He was then the Secretary of the Ministry of Environment, Forest and Climate Change.

In August 2017, Ahmed was made Member (Secretary) of the Bangladesh Planning Commission replacing Mustafa Kamal Uddin who was appointed Secretary of the Ministry of Home Affairs replacing Ahmed.

In September 2019, Ahmed was appointed Full Time Member of the National Human Rights Commission of Bangladesh under Chairman Nasima Begum. His appointment was criticized by the Asian NGO Network on National Human Rights Institutions which described it as a flawed selection.

In December 2022, Ahmed was appointed Chairman of the National Human Rights Commission of Bangladesh with pay and privilege of a judge of the Appellate Division of Supreme Court of Bangladesh. He defended the track record of the commission investigating law enforcement and enforced disappearance while highlighting the limitations of the commission.

Ahmed met the European Union election exploratory mission in July 2023 ahead of the 2024 general elections in Bangladesh to discuss the human rights situation in Bangladesh. He described sanctions by the United States on Rapid Action Battalion for human rights violations as "politically motivated".

After the fall of the Sheikh Hasina led Awami League government, a murder case was filed against Ahmed by Bangladesh Nationalist Party politician Mohammad Zaman Hossain Khan over the death of a protestor in July 2024.
