= Mizanur Rahman (professor) =

Bangladeshi legal academic and human rights advocate

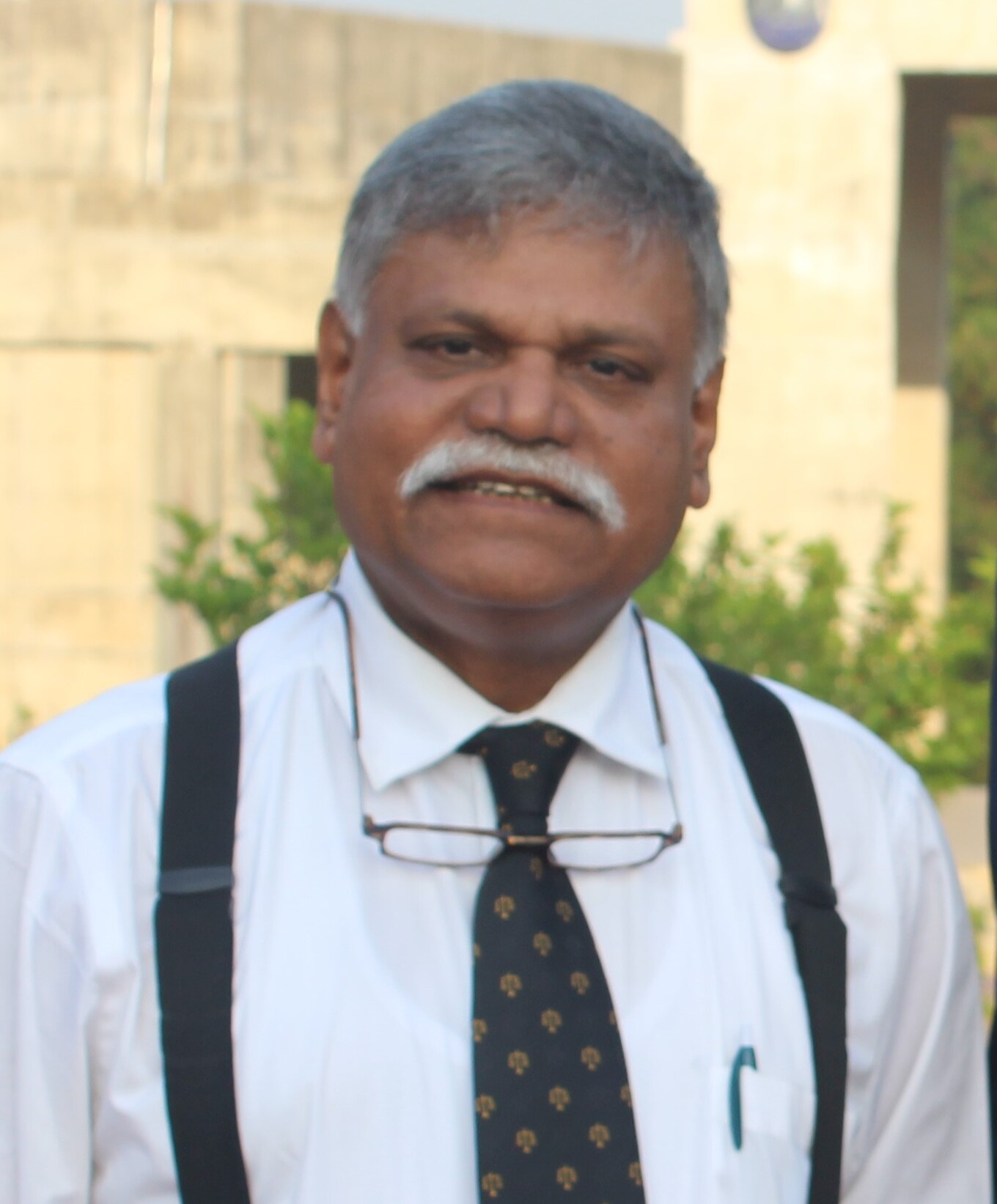
- Mizanur Rahman. 2020
- Born
- Education: University of Dhaka; Patrice Lumumba Peoples' Friendship University of Russia (Phd)
- Known for: First to introduce the "Street Law" initiative in South Asia; Developed the Rebellious Lawyering concept

Professor Dr. Mizanur Rahman is a Bangladeshi legal academic, human rights advocate and former chairman of the National Human Rights Commission of Bangladesh. He is the Director of the Bangladesh Institute of Law and International Affairs. He is the Director of the Centre for Advanced Legal Studies at the University of Dhaka and Advisor to the South Asian Network for Justice Education.

== Early life ==
Rahman completed his master's in law and PhD at the Patrice Lumumba Peoples' Friendship University of Russia.

== Career ==
Rahman began his academic career at the University of Dhaka in 1989 in the Department of Law. In 1990, he became the founding coordinator of the Professional Legal Education (Continuing Legal Education Programme - CLEP) under the Bangladesh Bar Council. He introduced clinical legal education methods and jointly coordinated the first Clinical Legal Education Program at the Faculty of Law, University of Dhaka. He was also the first to introduce the "Street Law" initiative in South Asia. He developed the Rebellious Lawyering concept in Bangladesh. In 2000, Rahman founded Empowerment through Law of the Common People, which focused on critical human rights education, awareness, and grassroots legal reform.

In 2010, Rahman was appointed Chairperson of the National Human Rights Commission. During this period, he represented Bangladesh at the Universal Periodic Review of the United Nations Human Rights Council. He worked on issues including prison reform, rights of the third gender, labour rights, issues on the Bangladesh-India Border, and legal awareness in the Chittagong Hill Tracts. He met Sahara Khatun, Minister of Home Affairs and demanded she investigate sensational murder cases and enforced disappearances such as M Ilias Ali, a former member of Parliament. He told her that enthusiastic law enforcers were engaging in human rights violations. He called comments by Inspector General of Police AKM Shahidul Hoque criticizing him "indecent". In 2013, Rahman visited Banshkhali in Chittagong after Hindu homes, temples, and businesses were attacked by activists of Bangladesh Jamaat-e-Islami and its student wing Bangladesh Islami Chhatra Shibir. The violence erupted following the war crimes verdict against Delawar Hossain Sayedee. Rahman condemned the attacks as acts of brutality and a challenge to state sovereignty, urged compensation for the victims, and called on political leaders to resist religious extremism and protect minority communities. He condemned the Bangladesh Election Commission for giving sexist symbols, dolls, gas stoves, etc., to female candidates.

Rahman called the trial of the Border Security Force soldier for the Shooting of Felani Khatun "a joke" after the trial found the soldier not guilty. He was denied entry to Sylhet Central Jail as he had not secured proper permission, according to Inspector General of Police Brigadier General Ashraful Islam Khan, whose removal Rahman had demanded. He stopped his plans to visit prisons after the incident. One of the drawbacks of the commission he highlighted was the lack of financial independence and he called for more freedom for the commission. He was critical of the slow investigation into the Murder of Sohagi Jahan Tonu. Rahman served as the Chairperson of the National Human Rights Commission for two consecutive terms till 2016.

Rahman called for exceptional support for residents of enclaves on the Bangladesh-India border. He was chairman of the Department of Law of the University of Dhaka. In March 2019, he was forced to resign as provost of Fazlul Huq Muslim Hall of the University of Dhaka by activists of the Bangladesh Chhatra League.

Rahman has consulted for international and national organizations, including UNICEF, USAID, UNDP, the Ford Foundation, ILO, and IOM. Domestically, he has advised institutions such as the Press Institute of Bangladesh, Bangladesh Insurance Academy, and the Ministry of Law, Justice and Parliamentary Affairs.
