= Centre for Governance Studies =

NPO Think Tank

- Formation: 2004
- Headquarters: Dhaka, Bangladesh
- Official language: Bengali
- Website: cgs-bd.com

The Centre for Governance Studies is a non-profit, nonpartisan think tank and research institute founded in 2004. It studies politics and governance in Bangladesh. Manjur Ahmed Chowdhury is chairman of the Centre for Governance Studies. Zillur Rahman is the executive director.

== History ==
Centre for Governance Studies was established in 2004. The advisory panel includes Ali Riaz, M Sakhawat Hossain, Nasim Ferdous, and Rokanuddin Mahmud.

In November 2023, executive director Zillur Rahman predicted Prime Minister Sheikh Hasina would face the same repression she was imposing on her opponents if she was removed from power. He also stated that “The Awami League are all so scared," as "They don’t have a safe exit”.

In December 2023, Centre for Governance Studies organized a conference titled Bangladesh at the Crossroads: Election, Economy, and External Relations where speakers spoke critically about the upcoming 2024 Bangladeshi general election which they said will be one sided and create a political crises. Speakers at the event included Zillur Rahman, Manjur Ahmed Chowdhury, Debapriya Bhattacharya, M Sakhawat Hossain, Ali Imam Majumder, Salehuddin Ahmed, Muhammad Abdul Mazid, ZI Khan Panna, Ahsan H Mansur, and Nurul Kabir.

On 21 April 2024, Somoy TV called Zillur Rahman, executive director of the Centre for Governance Studies, a US-funded rumour-monger. In December 2023, the channel suggest Zillur Rahman was trying to create another 1/11 which refers to the 2006–2008 Bangladesh political crisis and the non-political interim government Fakhruddin Ahmed. An evidence, it pointed out National Endowment for Democracy funding Centre for Governance Studies and Zillur Rahman praising Peter D. Haas, United States Ambassador to Bangladesh in an article. It also pointed out in another article Zillur Rahman was working with Saimum Parvez son of former Bangladesh Nationalist Party member of parliament Shahjahan Miah and who had written a paper for the media cell of the Bangladesh Nationalist Party, on a project called Confronting Misinformation in Bangladesh funded by 2022 Alumni Engagement Innovation Fund of the United States Department of State.

Centre for Governance Studies had organized a seminar called call to action against corruption with the Center for International Private Enterprise, where United States Ambassador to Bangladesh Peter D. Haas said investment can increase through reduced corruption.

Bangladesh Financial Intelligence Unit requested the bank account information of Zillur Rahman, executive director of Centre for Governance Studies and host of Tritiyo Matra on 9 August 2023. The National Board of Revenue began an investigation against him on 23 November 2022. The government of Bangladesh was criticized by Front Line Defenders.

In June 2024, the Centre for Governance Studies published an investigative report on 1,410 cases under Digital Security Act, 2018 found 77.78% politicians filing cases under the act were from the Awami League. Ali Riaz, member of Centre for Governance Studies, stated there were 7,001 cases against 21,867 people between 8 October 2018 and 31 January 2023 and 7,542 people were arrested in those cases.

After Sheikh Hasina was overthrown, Zillur Rahman said the interim government should prioritize holding elections and not make any major policy decision.
