= Zillur Rahman (journalist) =

Bangladeshi journalist

- জিল্লুর রহমান
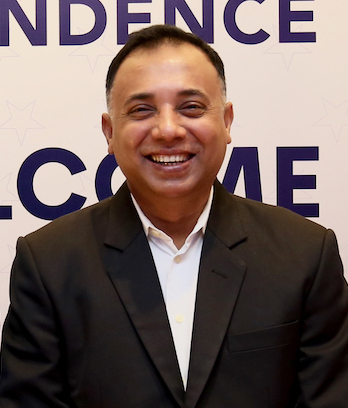
- Rahman in 2023
- Born: Dhaka, Bangladesh
- Education: Jahangirnagar University
- Occupations: Journalist, writer
- Notable work: Host of Tritiyo Matra
- Spouse: Fahmida Haque

Zillur Rahman is a Bangladeshi journalist and activist. He is the executive director of the Center for Governance Studies and host of Tritiyo Matra.

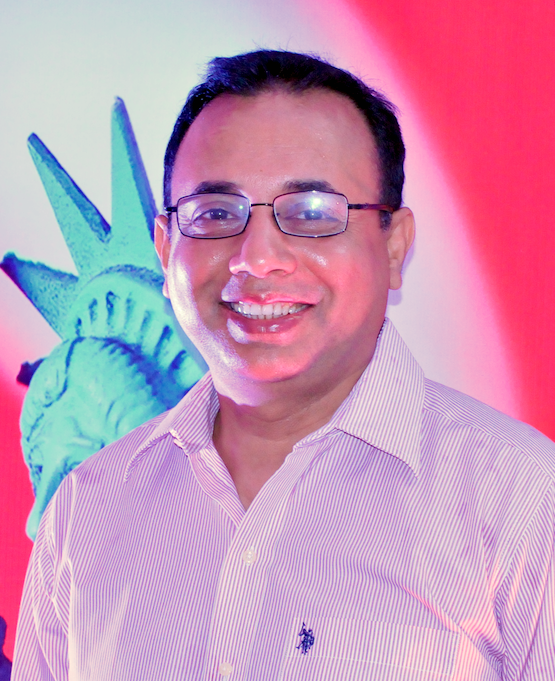
Zillur in 2022

== Early life ==
Rahman was born in Dhaka. His father A K M Khalilur Rahman was a lawyer, and his mother Shamim Parvin was a housewife. He graduated from Nawabpur Government High School. He completed his undergrad and a Post Graduated Degree in governance and politics at Jahangirnagar University.

== Career ==
Rahman joined the weekly Bichitra in 1986. He became the executive editor of the Khaborer Kagoj in 1987. He joined the Ajker Kagoj in 1991 as an assistant editor and then Bhorer Kagoj next year.

Rahman became the host of Tritiyo Matra in 2003. He had produced more than seven thousand episodes of the show. The show was stopped by the government during the 2006–2008 Bangladesh political crisis.

In 2007, Rahman visited the United States as part of the International Visitor Leadership Program organized by the U.S. Department of State's Bureau of Educational and Cultural Affairs.

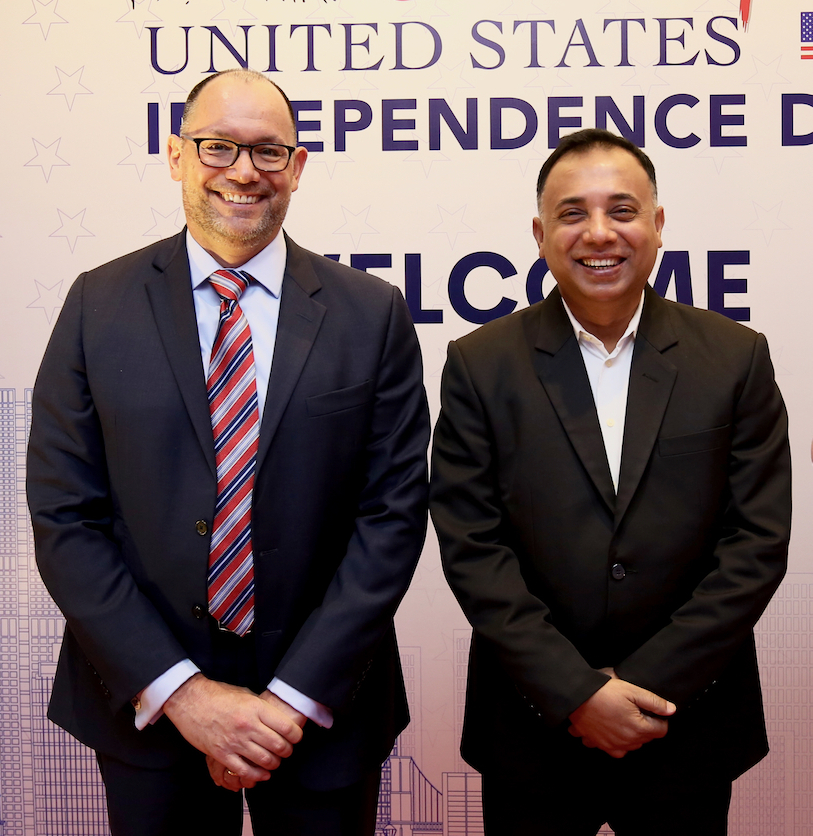
Peter D. Haas and Zillur Rahman, 2023

Bangladesh Financial Intelligence Unit sought information on Rahman's bank accounts. On 22 December 2022, Police questioned Rahman at his home which he considered harassment for his professional activities. It was condemned by ARTICLE 19. Police actions were condemned by activists such as Asif Nazrul, Mohammad Kamrul Ahsan, Nur Khan Liton, Jyotirmoy Barua, etc.

Before the 2024 Bangladeshi general election, Rahman said, “The Awami League are all so scared, they don’t have a safe exit”. In April 2024, Rahman attacked Bangladeshi journalists for having "corrupt nature". After the fall of the Sheikh Hasina led Awami League government, Rahman has written in favor of the Muhammad Yunus led Interim government.

== Bibliography ==
- Ek Bartho Avvuthaner Nayok Bolsen
- Chenamukh Chenamot
- Samorik Shasonottor Besamorik Sarkarer Samashya
- Gonoabvuthyan ’90

== Personal life ==
Rahman is married to Fahmida Haque. She was elected to Bangladesh Parliament in 2026 from a reserved seat as a candidate of the Bangladesh Nationalist Party.
