= Taqsem A. Khan =

Bangladeshi engineer

- তাকসেম এ. খান
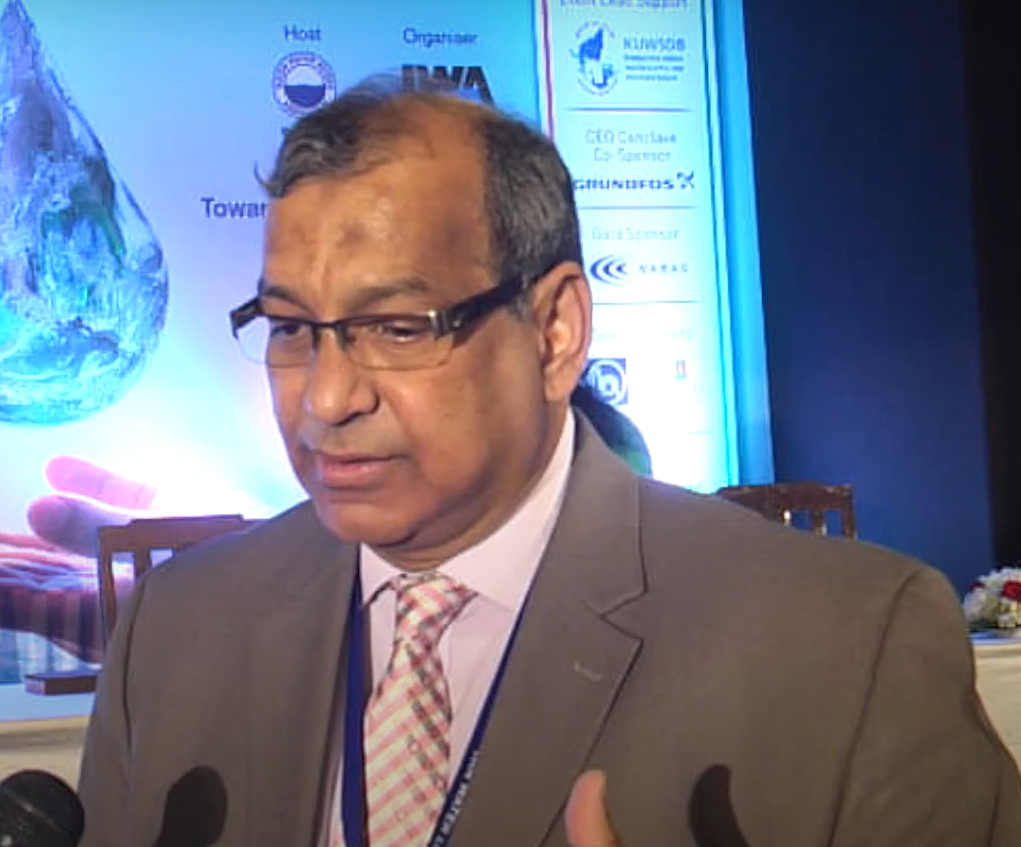
- Khan at Water Loss 2016 in Bangalore, India

Former Managing Director of Dhaka WASA
- In office 14 October 2009 – 14 August 2024
- Succeeded by: AKM Shahid Uddin

Personal details
- Citizenship: Bangladesh; United States
- Education: University of Moscow

Taqsem A. Khan is an engineer and a former managing director and CEO of Dhaka WASA, a government owned company responsible for water and sewage in the capital of Bangladesh, Dhaka from 2009 until 2024. He has been appointed five consecutive times in that same post since 2009 until his resignation on 14 August 2024, at the aftermath of the 2024 non-cooperation movement.

== Early life ==
Khan graduated from St. Gregory's High School and College. He did his master's in mechanical engineering at a university in Moscow. He joined Philips Bangladesh as a production engineer.

== Career ==
Khan served as the chief engineer of International Centre for Diarrhoeal Disease Research, Bangladesh from 1988 to 1998.

On 14 October 2009, he was appointed the managing director of Dhaka WASA. He has extended his tenure as the managing director of WASA five times.

On 21 October 2019, his comments saying WASA water in 100 percent pure were criticized in parliament by the parliamentary standing committee on public undertakings. According to Muhibur Rahman Manik, a member of the committee, Khan was criticized for the water not being safe and his comments. Bangladesh High Court in December 2009 criticized his comments saying that there were no sewage lines to Buriganga River. The court had directed WASA to close all sewage lines flowing to the river to reduce pollution in 2011. The court found his statement to be false. On 23 January 2020, Bangladesh High Court issued a contempt of court ruling against him for disobeying High Court directive and lying in court. The High Court observed that he was voluntarily refusing to obey the court directives.

Manjur Ahmed Chowdhury, chairman of the National River Conservation Commission, called for the jailing of Atiqul Islam, mayor of North Dhaka City, and Taqsem A Khan for failing in their duties to protect rivers.

On 14 August 2024, Taqsem A Khan resigned from his position as the managing director of Dhaka WASA. According to WASA executive engineer Badrul Alam, Taqsem stepped down due to health issues. In May 2025, an attempted murder case was filed against him over a student of Alia Madrasa getting injured in Old Dhaka during protests against former Prime Minister Sheikh Hasina in August 2024.

== Controversy ==
In 2016, Khan was interrogated by the Bangladesh Anti Corruption Commission over financial irregularities. According to banglanews24.com, there are allegations against him of embezzling 2 thousand crore from 10 mega projects of Dhaka WASA. He has faced questions over irregularities in the implementation of Padma Jashaldia water treatment plant project, a mega project of Dhaka WASA.

== Personal life ==
Taqsem has a US citizenship along with his wife and children.
