= Ektee Bari Ektee Khamar project =

- Formation: 2009
- Headquarters: Dhaka, Bangladesh
- Region served: Bangladesh
- Official language: Bengali
- Website: www.ebek-rdcd.gov.bd

Ektee Bari Ektee Khamar project (Bengali: একটি বাড়ি একটি খামার) (one house, one farm, project) is a Bangladesh government social welfare program designed to promote farming and welfare in rural Bangladesh and reduce rural poverty in Bangladesh through small loans. Akber Hossain is the project director in charge. It was an initiative of Prime Minister Sheikh Hasina.

== History ==
The Ektee Bari Ektee Khamar project was established in 2009, with an initial budget of 14.9 billion taka. The project has provided financing to 21.8 million people and formed about 90,000 Village Development Associations. The government matches the savings, up to 200 taka per month, of Village Development Associations members. In 2016, its budget was increased to 80 billion taka. The association also provides small loans to its members. Palli Sanchay Bank was established in 2014 with 49 percent of the shares owned by members of the Ektee Bari Ektee Khamar project and the rest by the Government of Bangladesh. In 2017, the project failed to meet its target loans. The project was authorised to have 11,627 staff but had only about half at 5,511.

In February 2019, Ektee Bari Ektee Khamar announced plans to raise the ceiling of individual loans from 50,000 to 100,000 taka. On 6 July 2019, employees of Ektee Bari Ektee Khamar and Palli Sanchay Bank held protests demanding the regularisation of their jobs. They also accused the Bank chairperson of being corrupt.
