= Tritiyo Matra =

- Created by: Zillur Rahman
- Presented by: Zillur Rahman
- Country of origin: Bangladesh
- No. of episodes: 7322 (August 19, 2023)

Production
- Producer: Impress Telefilm Limited

Original release
- Network: Channel I
- Release: July 17, 2003 – present

Tritiyo Matra is a Bangladeshi talk show aired on Channel I. On July 17, 2003 the program first aired on TV. The programme was the first talk show in Bangladesh. At present, the show broadcasts on Channel I in Bangladesh at 1:00 am and at 9:45 am. The program's planner, director and presenter is Zillur Rahman.

== Description ==
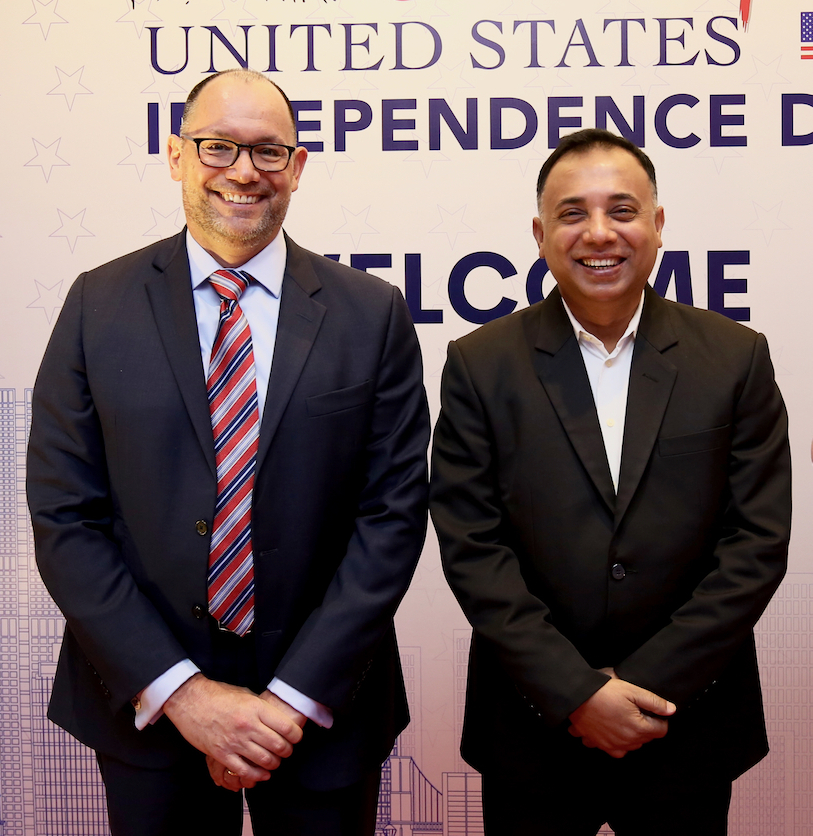
US Ambassador Peter D. Haas and Zillur Rahman

Tritiyo Matra discusses the important issues of politics. In each episode there are two guests, who argue for themselves. While the third dimension is primarily a politics-based discussion, many other issues are touched upon, including society, economics, science, literature, and humanities. On various important days in Bangladesh, the program also discusses outside politics. As of 2017, the show has aired more than 5000 episodes.

== Award ==
1. 2003 - Bangladesh Television Reporters Association Award, best talk-show
2. 2003, 2004, 2005 - Bangladesh Film Journalist Association Award, Television Department, Best Talk Show (Educational)
3. 2004 - Dhaka Cultural Reporters Association Star Award, Best Talk Show
4. 2004 - Stamford-Bangladesh Television Reporters Association Award
5. 2009 - Bangladesh Cultural Reporters Association

Besides, the Tritiyo Matra as the best television program was nominated for the 2003 Meril Prothom Aloa Award in 2003 and 2004.
