= Zoological Society of Bangladesh =

Academic and scientific society

The Zoological Society of Bangladesh
- বাংলাদেশ প্রাণিবিজ্ঞান সমিতি
- Abbreviation: ZSB
- Formation: 1972
- Type: Scientific think tank
- Purpose: Promote and advance the science of zoology in all its branches
- Headquarters: University of Dhaka
- Location: Dhaka, Bangladesh
- Region served: Bangladesh
- Official language: English; Bengali
- President: Khan Habibur Rahman
- Vice President: Gulshan Ara Latifa
- Vice President: Md. Anwarul Islam
- Vice President: Monirul H. Khan
- Website: zsbd.org.bd

The Zoological Society of Bangladesh is an academic and scientific society of professional zoologist, devoted and dedicated for scientific inquiry in the field of Zoology. The Zoological Society of Bangladesh (ZSB) was established in 1972. It is the oldest scientific society in Bangladesh. Presently, the Society has more than 1,600 members.

== Activities and publications ==
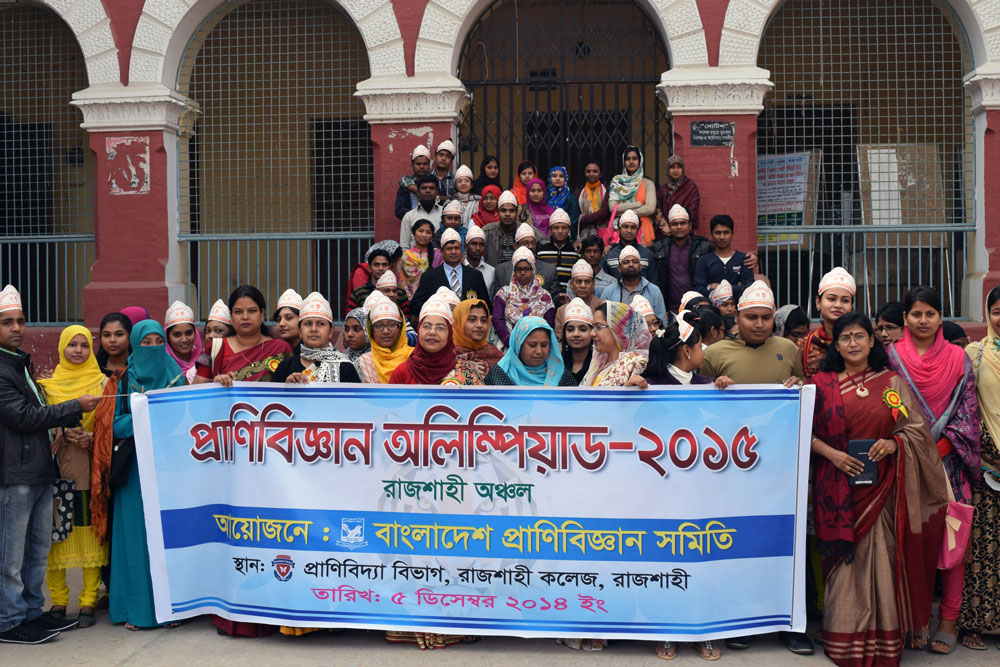
Photo from Zoology Olympiad 2015, Rajshahi Chapter

The objectives of the Society are to promote and advance the science of zoology in all its branches. The Society undertakes a wide range of activities including holding seminar, symposium, annual meeting. Bangladesh Journal of Zoology is an official scientific journal of the Zoological Society of Bangladesh published twice annually in June and December in English. Zoological Society of Bangladesh has launched the Zoology Olympiad in Bangladesh.

== Shankhacheel ==
The Zoological Society of Bangladesh publishes Bangla newsletter Shankhacheel regularly.

== Past Presidents and General Secretaries ==
Year	Presidents	General Secretaries
1972-1973	A. K. M. Aminul Haque	Kazi Zaker Hussain
1974-1975	M. Yusuf Ali	Kazi Zaker Hussain
1976-1977	M. Yusuf Ali	Kazi Zaker Hussain
1978-1979	Kazi Zaker Hussain	D. S. Islam
1980-1981	Kazi Zaker Hussain	Shahadat Ali
1982-1983	Mustafizur Rahman	Shahadat Ali
1984-1985	Mustafizur Rahman	Shahadat Ali
1986-1987	Kazi Zaker Hussain	R. W. R. Patra
1988-1989	S. M. Humayun Kabir	A. K .M. Nuruzzaman
1990-1991	(Mrs.) Anwara Begum	Moksed Ali Howlader
1992-1993	Shahadat Ali	Khalequzzaman
1994-1995	Mahmud-ul Ameen	Rezaur Rahman
1996-1997	M. Aftab Hossain	Md. Ismail Hossain
1998-1999	Shahadat Ali	Manjur A. Chowdhury
2000-2001	Mahmud-ul Ameen	Abdur Rab Mollah
2002-2003	Mahmud-ul Ameen	Humayan Reza Khan
2004-2005	Md. Abul Bashar	M. A. Howlader
2006-2007	Md. Abul Bashar	Md. Nazrul Haque
2008-2009	Md. Sohrab Ali	Abdur Rahman
2010-2011	Md. Abul Bashar	S. M. Munjurul Hannan Khan
2012-2013	Manjur A. Chowdhury	M. Niamul Naser
2014–2016	Khan Habibur Rahman	M. Niamul Naser
2016–present	Gulshan Ara Latifa	Tapan K Dey
