= Dhaka WASA =

Bangladeshi government agency

- ঢাকা পানি সরবরাহ ও পয়ঃনিষ্কাশন কর্তৃপক্ষ
- Seal of Dhaka WASA

Agency overview
- Formed: 1963; 63 years ago
- Jurisdiction: Greater Dhaka
- Headquarters: Wasa Bhavan, 98 Kazi Nazrul Islam Avenue, Kawran Bazar, Dhaka
- Agency executive: Md Shahjahan Miah, Managing Director
- Parent agency: Ministry of Local Government, Rural Development and Co-operatives
- Website: dwasa.org.bd

Dhaka Water Supply and Sewerage Authority (Bengali: ঢাকা ওয়াসা) is a Bangladesh government agency under the Ministry of Local Government, Rural Development and Co-operatives responsible for water supply and sewage disposal in Dhaka and Narayanganj. Md Shahjahan Miah is the Managing Director since May 18, 2025.

== History ==
Dhaka WASA was established in 1963 as an independent agency with the responsibility to supply water and sewage disposal to Dhaka. It also became responsible of water and sewage Narayanganj in 1990. In 1996, it became an autonomous for-profit body with the passage of WASA Act. On 16 March 2019, Parliamentary Standing Committee on Estimate recommended that the government of Bangladesh split Dhaka WASA into two different bodies along North and South Dhaka.

=== Criticism ===
In 2019, Transparency International Bangladesh reported that Dhaka WASA had what The Daily Star characterized as "rampant graft" and provided "poor service". In four out of ten zones of WASA, it was supplying water contaminated with harmful bacteria. According to a WASA report submitted to Bangladesh High Court, Dhaka WASA was supplying polluted water to 57 areas of Dhaka. Moreover, appointment of Wasa Managing Director Taqsem A Khan has been appointed as the MD for sixth consecutive terms of varying lengths, which create huge controversy despite widespread allegations of failure to provide safe water and improve waterlogging.

In October 2022, Dhaka WASA denied the allegations of corruption, asking for evidence. The managing director, Taqsem A. Khan, had been sued on charges of embezzling money from the employees fund. Anti Corruption Commission launched an investigation against Taqsem A. Khan.

== Board of directors ==
Name	Designation	Represents	Reference
Sujit Kumar Bala	Chairman	Consumers	
Md. Khairul Islam	Director	Ministry of Local Government, Rural Development and Co-operatives	
Rehana Perven	Director	Ministry of Finance	
Imran Ahmed	Director	Dhaka Chamber of Commerce & Industry	
Sabbir Ahmed	Director	The Institute of Chartered Accountants of Bangladesh	
	Director	Institution of Engineers, Bangladesh	
HAM Zahirul Islam Khan (Z. I. Khan Panna)	Director	Bangladesh Bar Council	
Md. Dip Azad	Director	Bangladesh Federal Union of Journalists	
Mostofa Jalal Mohiuddin	Director	Bangladesh Medical Association	
A. K. M. A. Hamid	Director	Institution of Diploma Engineers, Bangladesh	
Kha. Ma. Mamun Rashid Shuvro	Director	Dhaka South City Corporation	
Shikha Chakrobrothy	Director	Dhaka North City Corporation	
Taqsem A Khan	CEO and Managing Director	N/A	
Md Shahjahan Miah	CEO and Managing Director	Dhaka South City Corporation	
