= Minister of Home Affairs (Bangladesh) =

Head of the Ministry of Home Affairs of the Government of Bangladesh

People's Republic of Bangladesh Minister of Home Affairs
- বাংলাদেশের স্বরাষ্ট্রমন্ত্রী
- Government Seal of Bangladesh

- Flag of Bangladesh

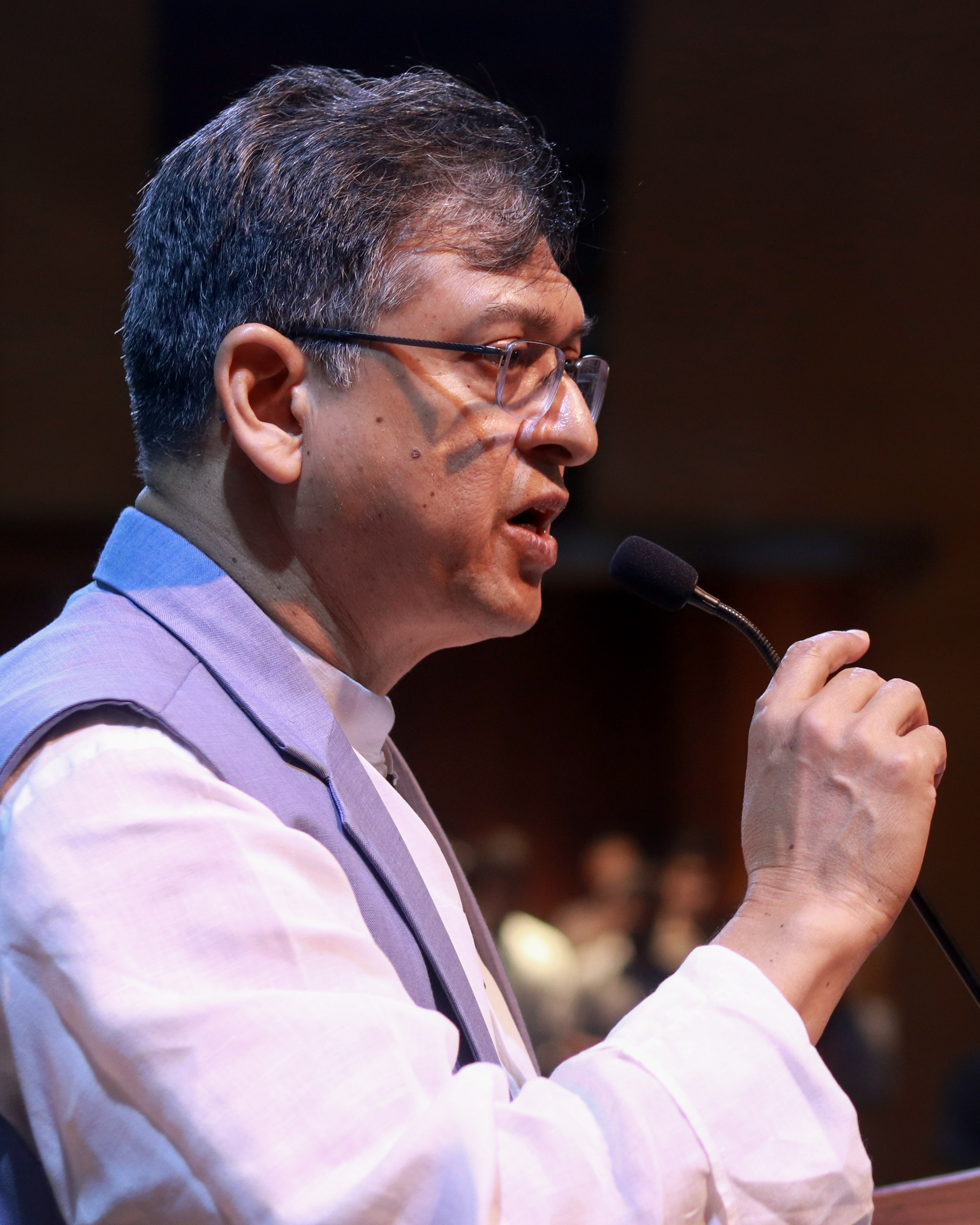
- Incumbent; Salahuddin Ahmed since 17 February 2026
- Ministry of Home Affairs
- Style: The Honourable (formal); His Excellency (diplomatic)
- Type: Cabinet minister
- Member of: Cabinet; Advisory Council; Parliament; National Committee on Security Affairs
- Reports to: Prime Minister
- Seat: Bangladesh Secretariat
- Nominator: Prime Minister of Bangladesh
- Appointer: President of Bangladesh; on the advice of the Prime Minister
- Term length: Prime Minister's pleasure
- Constituting instrument: Constitution of Bangladesh
- Formation: 10 April 1971; 55 years ago
- First holder: Abul Hasnat Muhammad Qamaruzzaman
- Salary: ৳245000 (US$2,000) per month (incl. allowances)
- Website: moha.gov.bd

The home minister of Bangladesh is the minister in charge of the Ministry of Home Affairs of the government of the People's Republic of Bangladesh. He is also the minister of all departments and agencies under the Ministry of Home Affairs. During the Caretaker government period the minister of Home affairs is known as Adviser of Home affairs.

Abul Hasnat Muhammad Qamaruzzaman was the first person appointed to this office by the then Mujibnagar government formed during the Bangladesh War of Independence in 1971.

== List of Ministers, Advisers and State Ministers ==
Political parties

- Bangladesh Awami League
- BaKSAL
- Bangladesh Nationalist Party
- Jatiya Party
- Independent politician

No.	Portrait	Officeholder (birth–death) Constituency	Term of office			Designation	Ministry	Prime Minister/ Chief Adviser
No.	Portrait	Officeholder (birth–death) Constituency	From	To	Tenure	Designation	Ministry	Prime Minister/ Chief Adviser
1		Abul Hasnat Muhammad Qamaruzzaman (1926–1975); MP for Rajshahi	10 April 1971	11 January 1972	276 days	Minister	Mujib I	Tajuddin Ahmad
2		Sheikh Mujibur Rahman (1920–1975); MP for Gopalganj-3	11 January 1972	12 April 1972	92 days	Minister	Mujib II	Sheikh Mujibur Rahman
3		Abdul Mannan (1929–2005); MP for Dhaka	12 April 1972	16 January 1973	279 days	Minister	Mujib II	Sheikh Mujibur Rahman
4		Abdul Malek Ukil (1924–1987); MP for Noakhali	16 January 1973	1 February 1974	1 year, 16 days	Minister	Mujib III	Sheikh Mujibur Rahman
5		Muhammad Mansur Ali (1919–1975); MP for Sirajganj	1 February 1974	15 August 1975	1 year, 195 days	Prime Minister	Mujib IV	Muhammad Mansur Ali
6		Khondaker Mostaq Ahmad (1918–1996)	15 August 1975	7 November 1975	84 days	Minister	Mostaq	Vacant
7		Ziaur Rahman (1936–1981)	7 November 1975	21 April 1977	2 years, 241 days	CMLA & Minister	Sayem	Mashiur Rahman (Acting)
7		Ziaur Rahman (1936–1981)	21 April 1977	6 July 1978	2 years, 241 days	CMLA & Minister	Zia	Shah Azizur Rahman
8		A S M Mustafizur Rahman (1934–1996); MP for Khulna-2	6 July 1978	27 November 1981	3 years, 144 days	Minister	Zia	Shah Azizur Rahman
9		M. A. Matin (1937–2012); MP for Pabna-5	27 November 1981	24 March 1982	117 days	Minister	Sattar	Shah Azizur Rahman
10		Hussain Muhammad Ershad (1930–2019)	24 March 1982	17 July 1982	115 days	CMLA & Minister	Ershad	Vacant
11		Mohabbat Jan Chowdhury (1933/1934–2026); MP for Faridpur-3	17 July 1982	19 July 1983	1 year, 2 days	Minister	Ershad	Vacant
12		Abdul Mannan Siddique (?–2000)	19 July 1983	17 February 1986	2 years, 213 days	Minister	Ershad	Ataur Rahman Khan
13		Mahmudul Hasan (1936–2025)	17 February 1986	1 December 1986	287 days	Minister	Ershad	Mizanur Rahman Chowdhury
14		M. A. Matin (1937–2012); MP for Pabna-5	1 December 1986	21 March 1989	2 years, 110 days	Minister	Ershad	Mizanur Rahman Chowdhury
15		Mahmudul Hasan (1936–2025)	21 March 1989	6 December 1990	1 year, 260 days	Minister	Ershad	Moudud Ahmed
16		Khaleda Zia (1945–2025); MP for Bogra-6	7 April 1991	19 September 1991	165 days	Prime Minister	Khaleda I	Khaleda Zia
17		Abdul Matin Chowdhury (1944–2012); MP for Narayanganj-1	19 September 1991	19 March 1996	4 years, 182 days	Minister	Khaleda I	Khaleda Zia
18		Khandaker Mosharraf Hossain (b. 1946); MP for Comilla-2	19 March 1996	30 March 1996	11 days	Minister	Khaleda II	Khaleda Zia
19		Muhammad Habibur Rahman (1928–2010)	30 March 1996	24 June 1996	86 days	Chief Adviser	Habibur	Muhammad Habibur Rahman
20		Rafiqul Islam (b. 1943); MP for Chandpur-5	24 June 1996	2 March 1999	2 years, 251 days	Minister	Hasina I	Sheikh Hasina
21		Mohammed Nasim (1948–2020); MP for Sirajganj-2	2 March 1999	16 July 2001	2 years, 136 days	Minister	Hasina I	Sheikh Hasina
22		Latifur Rahman (1939–2012)	16 July 2001	11 October 2001	87 days	Chief Adviser	Latifur	Latifur Rahman
23		Altaf Hossain Chowdhury (b. 1947); MP for Patuakhali-1	11 October 2001	26 March 2004	2 years, 167 days	Minister	Khaleda III	Khaleda Zia
24		Iajuddin Ahmed (1931–2012)	29 October 2006	11 January 2007	74 days	President & Chief Adviser	Iajuddin	Iajuddin Ahmed
25		M. A. Matin (born 1943)	16 January 2008	6 January 2009	356 days	Adviser	Fakhruddin	Fakhruddin Ahmed
26		Sahara Khatun (1943 – 2020); MP for Dhaka-18	7 January 2009	17 September 2012	3 years, 254 days	Minister	Hasina II	Sheikh Hasina
27		Muhiuddin Khan Alamgir (b. 1942); MP for Chandpur-1	18 September 2012	21 November 2013	1 year, 64 days	Minister	Hasina II	Sheikh Hasina
28		Sheikh Hasina (b. 1947); MP for Gopalganj-3	21 November 2013	14 July 2015	1 year, 235 days	Prime Minister	Hasina III	Sheikh Hasina
29		Asaduzzaman Khan (b. 1950); MP for Dhaka-12	15 July 2015	6 August 2024	9 years, 22 days	Minister	Hasina III	Sheikh Hasina
29		Asaduzzaman Khan (b. 1950); MP for Dhaka-12	15 July 2015	6 August 2024	9 years, 22 days	Minister	Hasina IV	Sheikh Hasina
29		Asaduzzaman Khan (b. 1950); MP for Dhaka-12	15 July 2015	6 August 2024	9 years, 22 days	Minister	Hasina V	Sheikh Hasina
30		M. Sakhawat Hossain (b. 1948)	9 August 2024	16 August 2024	7 days	Adviser	Yunus	Muhammad Yunus
31		Jahangir Alam Chowdhury (b. 1953)	16 August 2024	16 February 2026	1 year, 184 days	Adviser	Yunus	Muhammad Yunus
31		Salahuddin Ahmed (b. 1962); MP for Cox's Bazar-1	17 February 2026		242 days	Minister	Tarique	Tarique Rahman

State Ministers

No.	Portrait	Officeholder (birth–death) Constituency	Term of office			Designation	Ministry	Prime Minister
No.	Portrait	Officeholder (birth–death) Constituency	From	To	Tenure	Designation	Ministry	Prime Minister
1		Lutfozzaman Babar (b. 1958)	10 October 2001	29 October 2006	5 years, 19 days	Minister of State	Khaleda III	Khaleda Zia
2		Sohel Taj (b. 1970)	6 January 2009	31 May 2009	145 days	Minister of State	Hasina II	Sheikh Hasina
3		Shamsul Hoque Tuku (b. 1948)	31 July 2009	12 January 2014	4 years, 165 days	Minister of State	Hasina II	Sheikh Hasina
4		Khoda Baksh Chowdhury (b. 1952)	10 November 2024	24 December 2025	1 year, 44 days	Special Assistant	Yunus	Muhammad Yunus
