= Sheikh Hasina ministry =

Sheikh Hasina ministry may refer to:

- First Hasina ministry
- Second Hasina ministry
- Third Hasina ministry
- Fourth Hasina ministry
- Fifth Hasina ministry

== See also ==
- Premiership of Sheikh Hasina
