= Hasina Cabinet =

Hasina Cabinet is the name of either of four ministries of the Republic of Bangladesh:

- First Hasina ministry (1996–2001)
- Second Hasina ministry (2009–2014)
- Third Hasina ministry (2014–2019)
- Fourth Hasina ministry (2019–2024)

== See also ==
- Sheikh Hasina
- Cabinet of Bangladesh
