= Water Supply and Sewerage Authority =

- পানি সরবরাহ ও পয়ঃনিষ্কাশন কর্তৃপক্ষ; Pāni sarabarāha ō paẏaḥniṣkāśana Kartr̥pakṣa
- Government Seal of Bangladesh

Agency overview
- Formed: 1973; 53 years ago
- Jurisdiction: Government of Bangladesh
- Headquarters: Dhaka, Bangladesh
- Parent agency: Ministry of Local Government, Rural Development and Co-operatives
- Child agencies: Dhaka WASA; Chattogram WASA; Khulna WASA; Rajshahi WASA; Sylhet WASA

Water Supply and Sewerage Authority (WASA) is the main body administering Water supply, drainage and sanitation system in the city corporations of Bangladesh. It was established in 1963 as an independent organization, under the East Pakistan ordinance XIX. WASA operates according to the Dhaka WASA Act 1996.

== WASAs in Bangladesh ==
- Chattogram WASA
- Comilla WASA
- Dhaka WASA
- Khulna WASA
- Rajshahi WASA
- Sylhet WASA
