= First Hasina ministry =

15th Council of Ministers of Bangladesh

- 15th Council of Ministers of the People’s Republic of Bangladesh
- 23 June 1996 – 15 July 2001
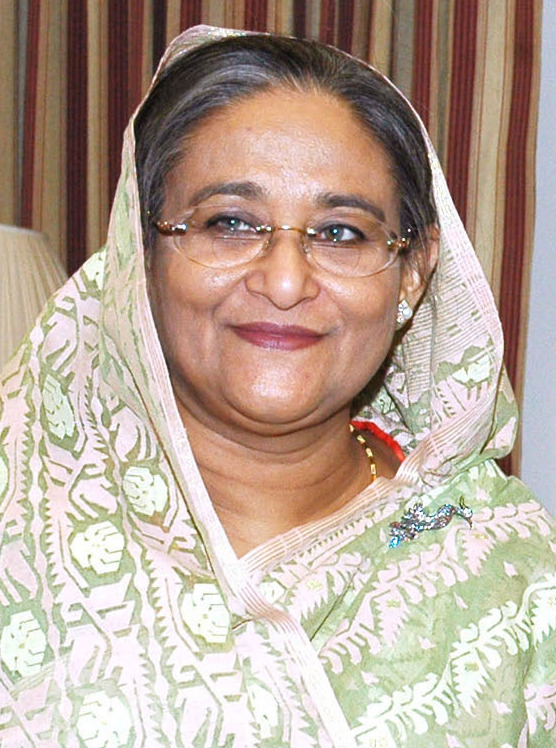
- Sheikh Hasina; Hon'ble Prime Minister of Bangladesh
- Date formed: 23 June 1996
- Date dissolved: 15 July 2001

People and organisations
- President: Abdur Rahman Biswas
- Prime Minister: Sheikh Hasina
- Total no. of members: 49 (Including the Prime Minister)
- Member party: Awami League; Jatiya Party (Ershad); Jatiya Samajtantrik Dal
- Status in legislature: Coalition
- Opposition party: Bangladesh Nationalist Party
- Opposition leader: Khaleda Zia

History
- Incoming formation: 7th Jatiya Sangsad
- Outgoing formation: 8th Jatiya Sangsad
- Election: 1996 (Jun)
- Outgoing election: 2001
- Legislature terms: 5 years, 22 days
- Predecessor: Habibur
- Successor: Latifur

The first Hasina ministry was the government of Bangladesh during the 7th legislative session of the Jatiya Sangsad following the 1996 general election; the 20-minister cabinet was formed on 23 June 1996 and dissolved on 15 July 2001.

== Ministers ==
=== Cabinet Ministers ===
Portfolio	Name	Took office	Left office	Party	Remarks
Prime Minister and also in-charge of: Cabinet Division; Ministry of Establishment; Ministry of Defence; Armed Forces Division; All important policy issues; and All other portfolios not allocated to any Minister.	Sheikh Hasina	23 June 1996	15 July 2001	AL	
Ministry of Information	Sheikh Hasina	23 June 1996	29 June 1996	AL	Prime Minister was responsible.
Ministry of Information	Abu Sayeed	29 June 1996	15 July 2001	AL	State Minister (M/C) was responsible.
Ministry of Shipping	Sheikh Hasina	23 June 1996	29 June 1996	AL	Prime Minister was responsible.
Ministry of Shipping	A. S. M. Abdur Rab	29 June 1996	24 December 1998	JSD	
Ministry of Shipping	Mofazzal Hossain Chowdhury	24 December 1998	15 July 2001	AL	State Minister (M/C) was responsible.
Ministry of Planning	Sheikh Hasina	23 June 1996	14 January 1997	AL	Prime Minister was responsible.
Ministry of Planning	Muhiuddin Khan Alamgir	14 January 1997	15 July 2001	AL	State Minister (M/C) was responsible.
Ministry of Environment and Forest	Sheikh Hasina	23 June 1996	14 January 1997	AL	Prime Minister was responsible.
Ministry of Environment and Forest	Sajeda Chowdhury	14 January 1997	15 July 2001	AL	
Ministry of Jute	Sheikh Hasina	23 June 1996	29 June 1996	AL	Prime Minister was responsible.
Ministry of Jute	A. K. Faezul Huq	29 June 1996	15 July 2001	AL	State Minister (M/C) was responsible.
Ministry of Textiles	Sheikh Hasina	23 June 1996	16 July 1996	AL	Prime Minister was responsible.
Ministry of Civil Aviation and Tourism	Sheikh Hasina	23 June 1996	29 January 1997	AL	Prime Minister was responsible.
Ministry of Civil Aviation and Tourism	Muhiuddin Khan Alamgir	29 January 1997	31 December 1997	AL	State Minister (M/C) was responsible.
Ministry of Civil Aviation and Tourism	Mosharraf Hossain	31 December 1997	15 July 2001	AL	
Ministry of Land	Sheikh Hasina	23 June 1996	29 June 1996	AL	Prime Minister was responsible.
Ministry of Land	Rashed Mosharraf	29 June 1996	15 July 2001	AL	State Minister (M/C) was responsible.
Ministry of Labour and Employment	Sheikh Hasina	23 June 1996	29 June 1996	AL	Prime Minister was responsible.
Ministry of Labour and Employment	M. A. Manan	29 June 1996	31 December 1997	AL	State Minister (M/C) was responsible.
Ministry of Labour and Employment	M. A. Manan	31 December 1997	15 July 2001	AL	
Ministry of Health and Family Welfare	Sheikh Hasina	23 June 1996	29 June 1996	AL	Prime Minister was responsible.
Ministry of Health and Family Welfare	Salahuddin Yusuf	29 June 1996	29 December 1999	AL	
Ministry of Health and Family Welfare	Sheikh Fazlul Karim Selim	29 December 1999	15 July 2001	AL	
Ministry of Foreign Affairs	Abdus Samad Azad	23 June 1996	15 July 2001	AL	
Ministry of Local Government, Rural Development and Co-operatives	Zillur Rahman	23 June 1996	29 December 1999	AL	
Ministry of Local Government, Rural Development and Co-operatives	Zillur Rahman (Local Government)	29 December 1999	15 July 2001	AL	
Ministry of Finance	Shah A M S Kibria	23 June 1996	15 July 2001	AL	
Ministry of Education; Primary and Mass Education Division	ASHK Sadek	23 June 1996	15 July 2001	AL	
Ministry of Science and Technology	ASHK Sadek	23 June 1996	23 December 1998	AL	
Ministry of Science and Technology	Nuruddin Khan	23 December 1998	15 July 2001	AL	
Ministry of Water Resources	Abdur Razzaq	23 June 1996	15 July 2001	AL	
Ministry of Commerce	Tofail Ahmed	23 June 1996	29 December 1999	AL	
Ministry of Commerce	Abdul Jalil	29 December 1999	15 July 2001	AL	
Ministry of Industries	Tofail Ahmed	23 June 1996	15 July 2001	AL	
Ministry of Power, Energy and Mineral Resources	Nuruddin Khan	23 June 1996	29 March 1998	AL	
Ministry of Power, Energy and Mineral Resources	Rafiqul Islam	29 March 1998	15 July 2001	AL	State Minister (M/C) was responsible.
Ministry of Home Affairs	Rafiqul Islam	23 June 1996	11 March 1999	AL	
Ministry of Home Affairs	Mohammed Nasim	11 March 1999	15 July 2001	AL	
Ministry of Posts and Telecommunications	Mohammed Nasim	23 June 1996	15 July 2001	AL	
Ministry of Agriculture	Matia Chowdhury	23 June 1996	15 July 2001	AL	
Ministry of Food	Matia Chowdhury	23 June 1996	29 December 1999	AL	
Ministry of Food	Amir Hossain Amu	29 December 1999	15 July 2001	AL	
Ministry of Disaster Management and Relief	Matia Chowdhury	23 June 1996	14 January 1997	AL	
Ministry of Disaster Management and Relief	Talukder Abdul Khaleque	14 January 1997	15 July 2001	AL	State Minister (M/C) was responsible.
Ministry of Communications	Anwar Hossain Manju	23 June 1996	15 July 2001	JP	
Ministry of Fisheries and Livestock	Satish Chandra Roy	23 June 1996	24 December 1998	AL	State Minister (M/C) was responsible.
Ministry of Fisheries and Livestock	A. S. M. Abdur Rab	24 December 1998	15 July 2001	JSD	
Ministry of Housing and Public Works	Afsaruddin Ahmad	23 June 1996	18 February 1997	AL	State Minister (M/C) was responsible. Resigned.
Ministry of Housing and Public Works	Sheikh Hasina	18 February 1997 c.	22 March 1997	AL	Prime Minister was responsible.
Ministry of Housing and Public Works	Mohammed Nasim	22 March 1997	11 March 1999	AL	
Ministry of Housing and Public Works	Mosharraf Hossain	11 March 1999	15 July 2001	AL	
Ministry of Law, Justice and Parliamentary Affairs	Abdul Matin Khasru	23 June 1996	14 January 1997	AL	State Minister (M/C) was responsible.
Ministry of Law, Justice and Parliamentary Affairs	Abdul Matin Khasru	14 January 1997	15 July 2001	AL	
Ministry of Chittagong Hill Tracts Affairs	Kalparanjan Chakma	21 July 1998	15 July 2001	AL	
Ministry of Without Portfolio	Kalparanjan Chakma	31 December 1997	21 July 1998	AL	
Ministry of Without Portfolio	Nuruddin Khan	29 March 1998	23 December 1998	AL	
Ministry of Without Portfolio	Rafiqul Islam	11 March 1999	12 January 2000	AL	Resigned.
Ministry of Without Portfolio	Salahuddin Yusuf	29 December 1999	6 October 2000	AL	Died in Office.

=== State Ministers (Ministry Charge) ===
Portfolio	Name	Took office	Left office	Party
Ministry of Women and Children Affairs	Mozammel Hossain	23 June 1996	24 December 1998	AL
Ministry of Women and Children Affairs	Zinnatunnessa Talukdar	24 December 1998	15 July 2001	AL
Ministry of Social Welfare	Mozammel Hossain	23 June 1996	15 July 2001	AL
Ministry of Youth and Sports; Ministry of Cultural Affairs	Obaidul Quader	23 June 1996	15 July 2001	AL
Ministry of Religious Affairs	Md. Nurul Islam	23 June 1996	15 July 2001	AL
Ministry of Textiles	A. K. Faezul Huq	16 July 1996	31 December 1997	AL
Ministry of Textiles	AKM Jahangir Hossain	31 December 1997	15 July 2001	AL

=== State Ministers ===
Portfolio	Name	Took office	Left office	Party	Remarks
Ministry of Foreign Affairs	Abul Hasan Chowdhury	23 June 1996	15 July 2001	AL	
Ministry of Local Government, Rural Development and Co-operatives	Syed Abul Hossain	23 June 1996	17 August 1997	AL	Resigned.
Ministry of Local Government, Rural Development and Co-operatives	Mofazzal Hossain Chowdhury	31 December 1997	24 December 1998	AL	
Ministry of Local Government, Rural Development and Co-operatives	Md. Rahmat Ali (Rural Development and Co-operatives)	29 December 1999	15 July 2001	AL	
Ministry of Health and Family Welfare	Mohammed Amanullah	14 January 1997	15 July 2001	AL	
Ministry of Science and Technology	Muhiuddin Khan Alamgir	31 December 1997	23 December 1998	AL	
Primary and Mass Education Division	Zinnatunnessa Talukdar	31 December 1997	24 December 1998	AL	
Primary and Mass Education Division	Satish Chandra Roy	24 December 1998	15 July 2001	AL	
Ministry of Power, Energy and Mineral Resources	Rafiqul Islam	31 December 1997	29 March 1998	AL	
Ministry of Water Resources	Md. Alauddin	17 February 1998	11 October 1999 (Note: Expelled from the BNP and his parliamentary seat was revoked.)	BNP	
Ministry of Housing and Public Works	Md. Alauddin	29 December 1999 (Note: Re-elected from Awami League)	26 February 2000	AL	Died in Office.
Ministry of Environment and Forest	H. N. Ashequr Rahman	29 December 1999	15 July 2001	AL	
Ministry of Communications	Anisul Haque Chowdhury	29 December 1999	15 July 2001	AL	
Ministry of Posts and Telecommunications	Abdur Rauf Chowdhury	29 December 1999	15 July 2001	AL	
Ministry of Fisheries and Livestock	Md. Abdul Quddus	29 December 1999	15 July 2001	AL	
Ministry of Civil Aviation and Tourism	Syed Ashraful Islam	6 January 2000	15 July 2001	AL	

=== Deputy ministers ===
Portfolio	Name	Took office	Left office	Party
Primary and Mass Education Division	Zinnatunnessa Talukdar	14 January 1997	31 December 1997	AL
Ministry of Shipping	Dhirendra Debnath Shambhu	14 January 1997	31 December 1997	AL
Ministry of Shipping	Saber Hossain Chowdhury	31 December 1997	24 December 1998	AL
Ministry of Food	Dhirendra Debnath Shambhu	31 December 1997	15 July 2001	AL
Ministry of Local Government, Rural Development and Co-operatives	Saber Hossain Chowdhury	24 December 1998	15 July 2001	AL
Ministry of Industries	Hashibur Rahman Swapon	9 February 1998	11 October 1999	BNP
