= List of Bangladeshi cabinets =

List of council of ministers of Bangladesh

The following is a list of government cabinets of Bangladesh.

Government Seal of Bangladesh
No.	Cabinet	Formation date	Election	Governing party	Governing system	Ref.
1	Tajuddin/Mujib I	17 April 1971	None	Bangladesh Awami League	Provisional	
2	Mujib II	13 January 1972	1970	Bangladesh Awami League	Provisional	
3	Mujib III	16 March 1973	1973	Bangladesh Awami League	Parliamentary	
4	Mujib IV	25 January 1975	None	Bangladesh Krishak Sramik Awami League	Presidential	
5	Mostaq	15 August 1975	None	Impartial	Interim	
6	Sayem I	10 November 1975	None	Impartial	Interim	
7	Sayem II	26 November 1975	None	Impartial	Interim	
8	Zia I	21 April 1977	1977(Referendum)	Military	Presidential	
9	Zia II	29 June 1978	1978	Jatiyatabadi Front	Presidential	
10	Zia III	15 April 1979	1979	Bangladesh Nationalist Party	Presidential	
11	Sattar	27 November 1981	1981	Bangladesh Nationalist Party	Presidential	
12	Ershad I	27 March 1982	1985(Referendum)	Military	Presidential	
13	Ershad II	11 December 1983	1986; 1988	Jatiya Party	Presidential	
14	Shahabuddin	6 December 1990	None	Impartial	Interim	
15	Khaleda I	20 March 1991	1991	Bangladesh Nationalist Party	Parliamentary	
16	Khaleda II	19 March 1996	Feb 1996	Bangladesh Nationalist Party	Parliamentary	
17	Habib	30 March 1996	None	Impartial	Caretaker	
18	Hasina I	23 June 1996	Jun 1996	Bangladesh Awami League	Parliamentary	
19	Latif	15 July 2001	None	Impartial	Caretaker	
20	Khaleda III	10 October 2001	2001	Bangladesh Nationalist Party	Parliamentary	
21	Iajuddin	29 October 2006	None	Impartial	Caretaker	
22	Fakhruddin	11 January 2007	None	Impartial	Caretaker	
23	Hasina II	6 January 2009	2008	Bangladesh Awami League	Parliamentary	
24	Hasina III	24 January 2014	2014	Bangladesh Awami League	Parliamentary	
25	Hasina IV	7 January 2019	2018	Bangladesh Awami League	Parliamentary	
26	Hasina V	11 January 2024	2024	Bangladesh Awami League	Parliamentary	
27	Yunus	8 August 2024	None	Impartial	Interim	
28	Tarique	17 February 2026	2026	Bangladesh Nationalist Party	Parliamentary	

== See also ==
- Politics of Bangladesh
- History of Bangladesh after independence
- List of prime ministers of Bangladesh
