= Fourth Hasina ministry =

25th Council of Ministers of Bangladesh

- 22nd Council of Ministers of the People’s Republic of Bangladesh
- 7 January 2019 – 11 January 2024
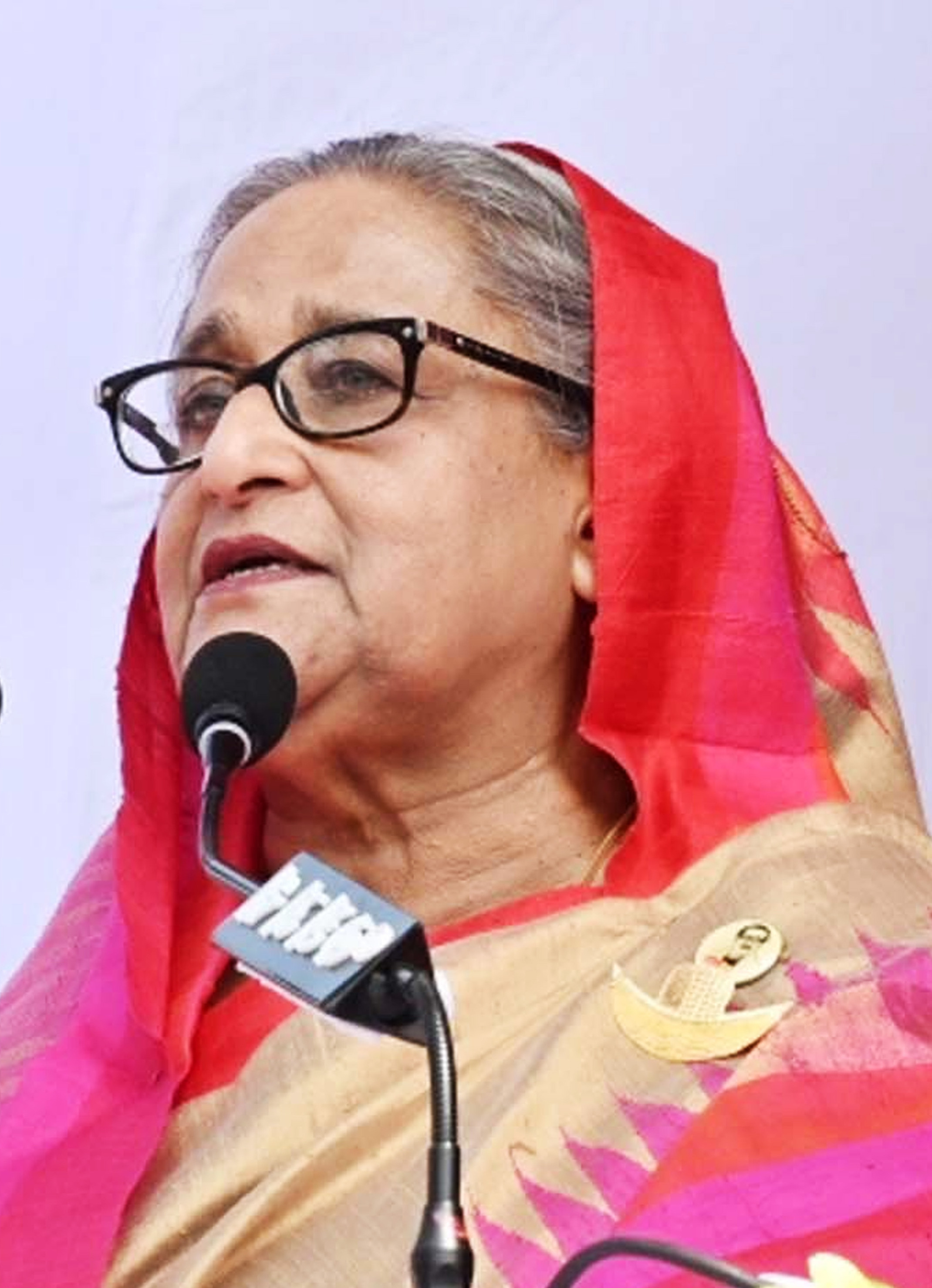
- Sheikh Hasina; Hon'ble Prime Minister of Bangladesh
- Date formed: 7 January 2019
- Date dissolved: 11 January 2024

People and organisations
- President: Mohammad Abdul Hamid
- Prime Minister: Sheikh Hasina
- Total no. of members: 50 (Including the Prime Minister)
- Member party: Awami League
- Status in legislature: Majority
- Opposition party: Jatiya Party (Ershad)
- Opposition leader: Hussain Muhammad Ershad (Until 14 July 2019); Rowshan Ershad (Since 9 September 2019)

History
- Election: 2018
- Outgoing election: 2024
- Legislature terms: 5 years, 4 days
- Incoming formation: 11th Jatiya Sangsad
- Outgoing formation: 12th Jatiya Sangsad
- Predecessor: Hasina III
- Successor: Hasina V

The Fourth Hasina ministry was the 22nd cabinet of Bangladesh headed by Prime Minister of Bangladesh Sheikh Hasina which was formed after the 2018 general election which was held on 30 December 2018. The results of the election were announced on 31 December 2018 and this led to the formation of the 11th assembly in the Jatiya Sangsad. The swearing-in ceremony was arranged in Bangabhaban in the Capital. Hasina's cabinet was staggeringly large, with 54 members.

== Ministers ==
=== Cabinet Ministers ===
Portfolio	Name	Took office	Left office	Party	Remarks
Prime Minister and also in-charge of: Cabinet Division; Ministry of Public Administration; Ministry of Defence; Armed Forces Division; Ministry of Power, Energy and Mineral Resources; Ministry of Women and Children Affairs	Sheikh Hasina	7 January 2019	11 January 2024	AL	
Ministry of Liberation War Affairs	AKM Mozammel Haque	7 January 2019	11 January 2024	AL	
Ministry of Road Transport and Bridges	Obaidul Quader	7 January 2019	11 January 2024	AL	
Ministry of Agriculture	Mohammad Abdur Razzaque	7 January 2019	11 January 2024	AL	
Ministry of Home Affairs	Asaduzzaman Khan	7 January 2019	11 January 2024	AL	
Ministry of Information	Hasan Mahmud	7 January 2019	15 March 2021	AL	Renamed as Ministry of Information and Broadcasting
Ministry of Information and Broadcasting	Hasan Mahmud	15 March 2021	11 January 2024	AL	
Ministry of Law, Justice and Parliamentary Affairs	Anisul Huq	7 January 2019	11 January 2024	AL	
Ministry of Finance	Mustafa Kamal	7 January 2019	11 January 2024	AL	
Ministry of Local Government, Rural Development and Co-operatives	Tajul Islam	7 January 2019	19 May 2019	AL	
Ministry of Local Government, Rural Development and Co-operatives	Tajul Islam (Local Government)	19 May 2019	11 January 2024	AL	
Ministry of Education	Dipu Moni	7 January 2019	11 January 2024	AL	
Ministry of Foreign Affairs	AK Abdul Momen	7 January 2019	11 January 2024	AL	
Ministry of Planning	M. A. Mannan	7 January 2019	11 January 2024	AL	
Ministry of Industries	Nurul Majid Mahmud Humayun	7 January 2019	11 January 2024	AL	
Ministry of Textiles and Jute	Golam Dastagir Gazi	7 January 2019	11 January 2024	AL	
Ministry of Health and Family Welfare	Zahid Maleque	7 January 2019	11 January 2024	AL	
Ministry of Food	Sadhan Chandra Majumder	7 January 2019	11 January 2024	AL	
Ministry of Commerce	Tipu Munshi	7 January 2019	11 January 2024	AL	
Ministry of Social Welfare	Nuruzzaman Ahmed	7 January 2019	11 January 2024	AL	
Ministry of Housing and Public Works	SM Rezaul Karim	7 January 2019	13 February 2020	AL	
Ministry of Housing and Public Works	Sharif Ahmed	13 February 2020	11 January 2024	AL	State Minister (M/C) was responsible.
Ministry of Environment, Forest and Climate Change	Shahab Uddin	7 January 2019	11 January 2024	AL	
Ministry of Chittagong Hill Tracts Affairs	Ushwe Sing	7 January 2019	11 January 2024	AL	
Ministry of Land	Saifuzzaman Chowdhury	7 January 2019	11 January 2024	AL	
Ministry of Railways	Nurul Islam Sujon	7 January 2019	11 January 2024	AL	
Ministry of Science and Technology	Yeafesh Osman	7 January 2019	29 November 2023	AL	Resigned.
Ministry of Science and Technology	Sheikh Hasina	29 November 2023	11 January 2024	AL	Prime Minister was responsible.
Ministry of Posts, Telecommunications and Information Technology	Mustafa Jabbar	7 January 2019	19 May 2019	Ind	
Ministry of Posts, Telecommunications and Information Technology	Mustafa Jabbar (Posts and Telecommunications)	19 May 2019	29 November 2023	Ind	Resigned.
Ministry of Posts, Telecommunications and Information Technology	Zunaid Ahmed Palak	29 November 2023	11 January 2024	AL	State Minister (M/C) was responsible.
Ministry of Expatriates' Welfare and Overseas Employment	Imran Ahmad	7 January 2019	11 July 2019	AL	State Minister (M/C) was responsible.
Ministry of Expatriates' Welfare and Overseas Employment	Imran Ahmad	11 July 2019	11 January 2024	AL	
Ministry of Fisheries and Livestock	Ashraf Ali Khan Khasru	7 January 2019	13 February 2020	AL	State Minister (M/C) was responsible.
Ministry of Fisheries and Livestock	SM Rezaul Karim	13 February 2020	11 January 2024	AL	
Ministry of Religious Affairs	Sheikh Mohammed Abdullah	7 January 2019	13 June 2020	AL	State Minister (M/C) was responsible. Died in Office.
Ministry of Religious Affairs	Sheikh Hasina	13 June 2020	24 November 2020	AL	Prime Minister was responsible.
Ministry of Religious Affairs	Faridul Haq Khan	24 November 2020	11 January 2024	AL	State Minister (M/C) was responsible.

=== State Ministers (Ministry Charge) ===
Portfolio	Name	Took office	Left office	Party
Ministry of Youth and Sports	Zahid Ahsan Russel	7 January 2019	11 January 2024	AL
Ministry of Power, Energy and Mineral Resources	Nasrul Hamid	7 January 2019	11 January 2024	AL
Ministry of Shipping	Khalid Mahmud Chowdhury	7 January 2019	11 January 2024	AL
Ministry of Primary and Mass Education	Md Zakir Hossain	7 January 2019	11 January 2024	AL
Ministry of Water Resources	Zaheed Farooque	7 January 2019	11 January 2024	AL
Ministry of Cultural Affairs	K. M. Khalid	7 January 2019	11 January 2024	AL
Ministry of Disaster Management and Relief	Md. Enamur Rahaman	7 January 2019	11 January 2024	AL
Ministry of Civil Aviation and Tourism	Md. Mahbub Ali	7 January 2019	11 January 2024	AL

=== State Ministers ===
Portfolio	Name	Took office	Left office	Party	Remarks
Ministry of Industries	Kamal Ahmed Majumder	7 January 2019	11 January 2024	AL	
Ministry of Labour and Employment	Monnujan Sufian	7 January 2019	11 January 2024	AL	
Ministry of Foreign Affairs	Shahriar Alam	7 January 2019	11 January 2024	AL	
Ministry of Posts, Telecommunications and Information Technology	Zunaid Ahmed Palak (Information and Communication Technology)	7 January 2019	29 November 2023	AL	
Ministry of Public Administration	Farhad Hossain	7 January 2019	11 January 2024	AL	
Ministry of Local Government, Rural Development and Co-operatives	Swapan Bhattacharjee	7 January 2019	19 May 2019	AL	
Ministry of Local Government, Rural Development and Co-operatives	Swapan Bhattacharjee (Rural Development and Co-operatives)	19 May 2019	11 January 2024	AL	
Ministry of Health and Family Welfare	Murad Hasan	7 January 2019	19 May 2019	AL	
Ministry of Social Welfare	Sharif Ahmed	7 January 2019	13 February 2020	AL	
Ministry of Social Welfare	Ashraf Ali Khan Khasru	13 February 2020	11 January 2024	AL	
Ministry of Information	Murad Hasan	19 May 2019	15 March 2021	AL	Renamed as Ministry of Information and Broadcasting.
Ministry of Information and Broadcasting	Murad Hasan	15 March 2021	7 December 2021	AL	Resigned.
Ministry of Women and Children Affairs	Fazilatun Nessa Indira	11 July 2019	11 January 2024	AL	
Ministry of Planning	Shamsul Alam	18 July 2021	29 November 2023	AL	Resigned.

=== Deputy Ministers ===
Portfolio	Name	Took office	Left office	Party
Ministry of Environment, Forest and Climate Change	Habibun Nahar	7 January 2019	11 January 2024	AL
Ministry of Water Resources	Enamul Haque Shamim	7 January 2019	11 January 2024	AL
Ministry of Education	Mohibul Hasan Chowdhury	7 January 2019	11 January 2024	AL

== See also ==
- List of Bangladeshi governments
