= Law enforcement in Bangladesh =

Law enforcement in Bangladesh is one part of the justice system in Bangladesh along with Prisons and Courts.

== Types of Law enforcement agencies ==
=== Bangladesh Police ===
During the Mughal rule of the Bengal Subah there was a policing administration responsible for public safety. The British developed a structured police administration based on Police Reform of 1782. Following the Indian Mutiny in 1857, the British reformed the colonial police force through the Police Report of 1860 to make it a more effective force. The current Bangladesh Police is based on the British colonial police administration. The head of Bangladesh Police is the Inspector General of Police. Then under the Inspector General of Police is the Deputy Inspector Generals of Police, they are responsible for six civil range and one additional range responsible for Bangladesh Railway. Then under them are the Additional Inspector General of Police, who are the Commissioners of Metropolitan Police, chief of the Criminal Investigation Department, Chief of the Special Branch, and the head of Bangladesh Police Academy. The Police Superintendents are responsible for the police administration at District Level which is under the civil range. Additional Superintendents are responsible head the police circles under the District police. The individual Police Stations fall under the circle and is headed by an inspector level officer-in-charge. The Criminal Investigation Department and Special Branch operate parallel to the regular police administration and report directly to the Police headquarters.

=== Rapid Action Battalion ===
Rapid Action Battalion is a law enforcement force. It was created through the Armed Police Battalion (Amendment) Act in 2003. The force is composed of members of Bangladesh Police, Bangladesh Army, Bangladesh Navy, and Bangladesh Air Force. Rapid Action Battalion has been criticized by the media and human rights organizations for extrajudicial killings. The force has been successfully used against Islamic militants in Bangladesh Human Rights organizations have referred to Rapid Action Battalion as a "government death squad".

=== Ansar and Village Defence Party ===
Bangladesh Ansar and Village Defence Party are a disciplined law enforcement agency.It was formed through the passage of Ansar Act 1948 in the East Bengal Legislative Assembly. From 1948 to 1971, when Bangladesh was part of Pakistan, the Ansar force was under the control of National Service Board. After the Independence of Bangladesh, it was placed under the Ministry of Home Affairs in 1973. In 1976, the Village Defence Party were created. In 1980 a separate cadre was established in the Bangladesh Civil Service for Ansars. They were declared a disciplined force through the passage of Ansar Bahini, Battalion Ansar, Village Defence Party Acts in the parliament of Bangladesh in 1995.

=== Gram Police ===
Gram Police Bahini are village police unit of Bangladesh. Their salary is paid by the Government of Bangladesh and Union Parishad (local government). They are poorly paid and have been campaigning to receive fourth grade salary from Bangladesh Government.

== See also ==
- List of Law Enforcement Agencies in Bangladesh
- Bangladesh Ansar
- Bangladesh Police
