= Habibur Rahman ministry =

14th Council of Ministers of Bangladesh

- 14th Council of Ministers and 5th Council of Advisers of the People’s Republic of Bangladesh
- 31 March 1996 – 23 June 1996
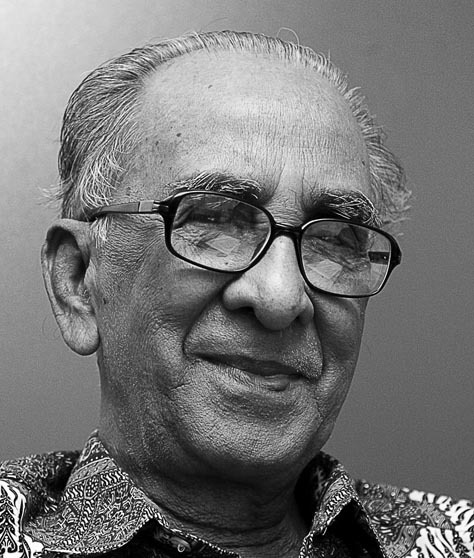
- Date formed: 31 March 1996
- Date dissolved: 23 June 1996

People and organisations
- President: Abdur Rahman Biswas
- Chief Adviser: Muhammad Habibur Rahman
- No. of ministers: 11
- Status in legislature: Dissolved

History
- Outgoing election: 1996 (Jun)
- Legislature term: 84 days
- Predecessor: Khaleda II
- Successor: Hasina I

The Habibur Rahman Cabinet led the Caretaker government of Bangladesh from 30 March 1996 to 23 June 1996.

== List of Advisers ==
Cabinet members
Portfolio	Minister	Took office	Left office
Chief Adviser and also in-charge of: Cabinet Division; Ministry of Establishment; Ministry of Home Affairs; Ministry of Foreign Affairs; Ministry of Information; Bangladesh Election Commission; Special Affairs Division	Muhammad Habibur Rahman	31 March 1996	23 June 1996
Adviser of Law, Justice and Parliamentary Affairs; Adviser of Local Government, Rural Development and Co-operatives	Syed Ishtiaq Ahmed	3 April 1996	23 June 1996
Adviser of Science and Technology; Adviser of Primary and Mass Education; Adviser of Environment and Forests	Muhammad Yunus	3 April 1996	23 June 1996
Adviser of Education; Adviser of Youth and Sports; Adviser of Cultural Affairs	M. Shamshul Haque	3 April 1996	23 June 1996
Adviser of Industries; Adviser of Commerce; Adviser of Jute; Adviser of Textiles	Shegufta Bakht Chaudhuri	3 April 1996	23 June 1996
Adviser of Agriculture; Adviser of Food; Adviser of Fisheries and Livestock; Adviser of Disaster Management and Relief; Adviser of Land	A. Z. M. Nasiruddin	3 April 1996	23 June 1996
Adviser of Health and Family Welfare; Adviser of Religious Affairs	Abdur Rahman Khan	3 April 1996	23 June 1996
Adviser of Finance; Adviser of Planning	Wahiduddin Mahmud	3 April 1996	23 June 1996
Adviser of Communications; Adviser of Shipping; Adviser of Civil Aviation and Tourism; Adviser of Posts and Telecommunications; Adviser of Housing and Public Works	Syed Manzur Elahi	3 April 1996	23 June 1996
Adviser of Labour and Manpower; Adviser of Social Welfare; Adviser of Women and Children Affairs	Najma Chowdhury	3 April 1996	23 June 1996
Adviser of Power, Energy and Mineral Resources; Adviser of Water Resources	Jamilur Reza Choudhury	3 April 1996	23 June 1996
