= Md. Mominul Haque =

Bangladeshi politician (born 1962)

- মোঃ মমিনুল হক

Member of the Bangladesh Parliament for Chandpur-5
- Incumbent
- Assumed office 17 February 2026
- Preceded by: Rafiqul Islam

Personal details
- Born: 1 January 1962 (age 64) Hajiganj Upazila, Chandpur District
- Party: Bangladesh Nationalist Party

Md. Mominul Haque is a Bangladeshi politician. He is currently serving as a member of parliament from Chandpur-5 .

== Early life ==
Haque was born on 1 January 1962 at Hajiganj Upazila under Chandpur District.
