= Fifth Hasina ministry =

Government of Bangladesh in 2024

- 23rd Council of Ministers of the People’s Republic of Bangladesh
- 11 January – 5 August 2024
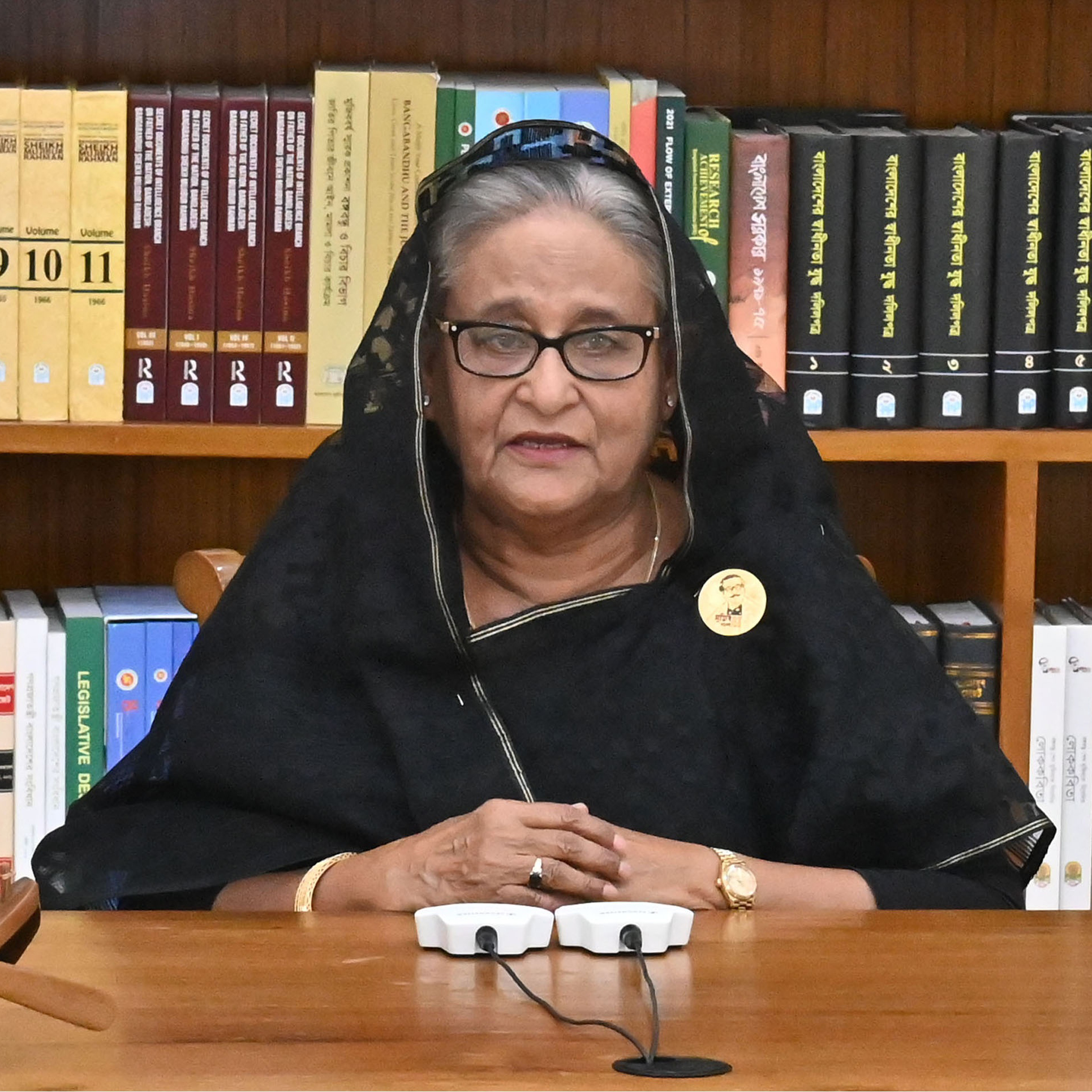
- Sheikh Hasina; Hon'ble Prime Minister of Bangladesh
- Date established: 11 January 2024
- Date dissolved: 5 August 2024

Leadership and composition
- President: Mohammed Shahabuddin
- Prime Minister: Sheikh Hasina
- Total no. of members: 44 (Including the Prime Minister)
- Member party: Awami League
- Status in legislature: Majority
- Opposition party: Jatiya Party (Ershad)
- Opposition leader: Ghulam Muhammed Quader

Formation and history
- Incoming formation: 12th Sangsad
- Election: 2024
- Legislature term: 207 days
- Predecessor: Hasina IV
- Successor: Yunus

The Fifth Hasina Ministry, the 23rd cabinet of Bangladesh, was led by Prime Minister of Bangladesh Sheikh Hasina. It was established following the 2024 general election held on 7 January 2024. The election results were declared on the same day, leading to the formation of the 12th assembly in the Jatiya Sangsad. A cabinet comprising 43 members was subsequently sworn in. On 5 August 2024, after days of deadly unrest in the country, Hasina was given an ultimatum by General Waker-uz-Zaman, the Bangladesh Chief of the Army Staff, to resign. Later the same day, she resigned and fled to India. (Note: Multiple references:) Her rule ended via self-imposed exile following nationwide protests. (Note: Multiple references:) The parliament was dissolved by the President Mohammed Shahabuddin the following day.

== Swearing-in ceremony ==
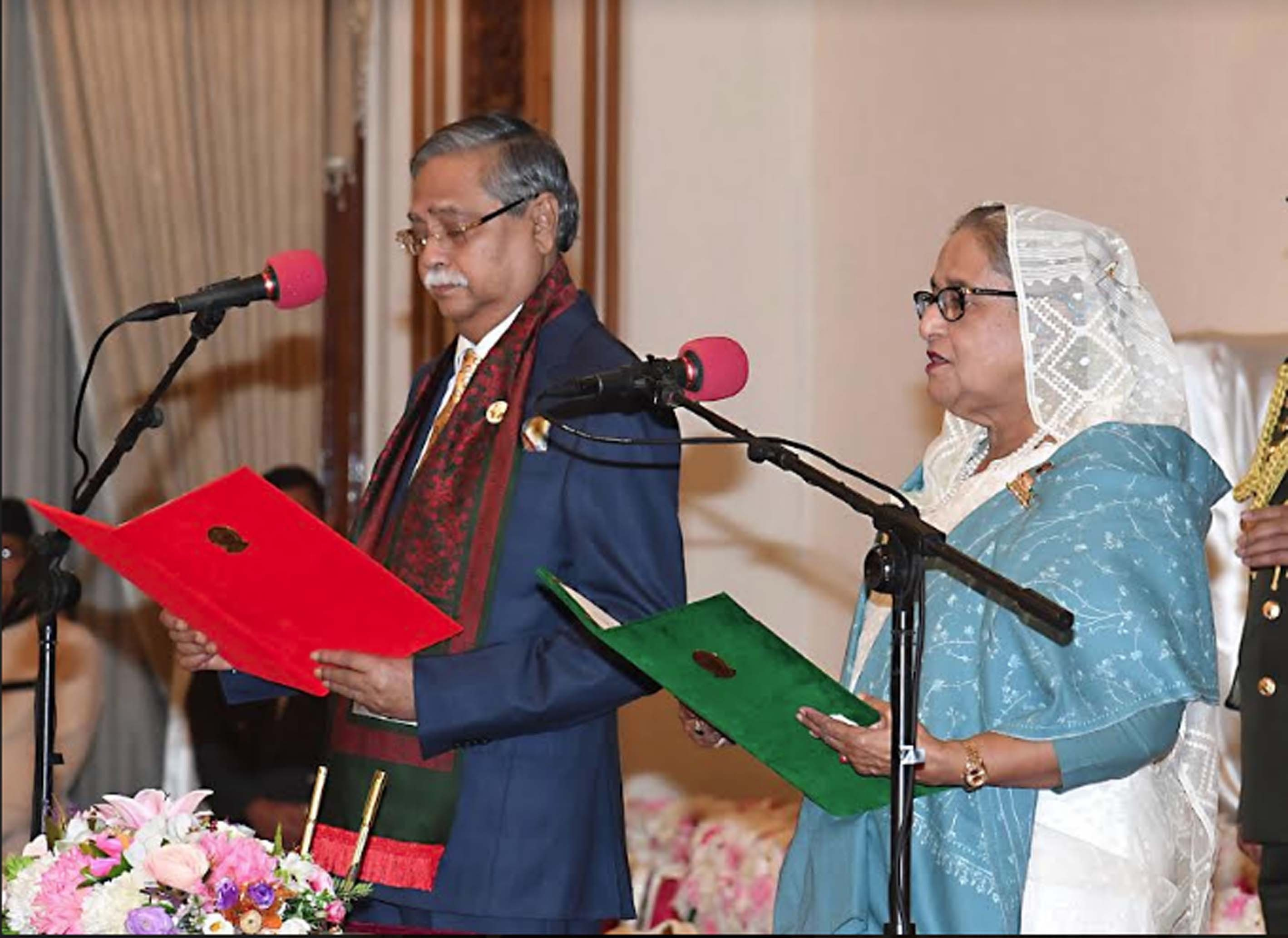
President Mohammed Shahabuddin administered the oath of office to newly appointed Prime Minister Sheikh Hasina at the Darbar Hall of Bangabhaban in Dhaka.

The fifth oath of office ceremony of Sheikh Hasina as Prime Minister of Bangladesh took place on January 11, 2024, following her party's victory in the 2024 general election. (Note: Multiple references:) The oath of office was administered by President Mohammed Shahabuddin, marking the formation of the Fifth Hasina ministry and the 12th Jatiya Sangsad.

=== Background ===
Fifth Hasina ministry
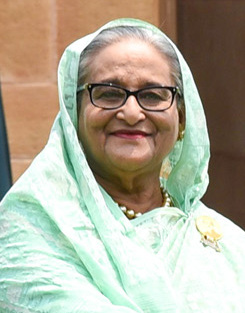
- Date: 11 January 2024; 2 years ago
- Location: Dhaka, Bangladesh
- Participants: Prime Minister of Bangladesh, Sheikh Hasina Assuming office President of Bangladesh, Mohammed Shahabuddin Administering oath

On 7 January 2024, the Awami League won the 2024 election. They defeated the opposition under GM Quader of the Jatiya Party. Awami League won 216 Seats while the opposition only won 11 Seats. (Note: Multiple references:) The election, however, was boycotted by all major political parties in Bangladesh. The election only had a voter turnout of 41%, a 38 percentage point decrease from the prior election. The Awami league has been accused for forging the opposition.

The 12th Jatiya Sangsad was formed.

They held their first session on January 30.

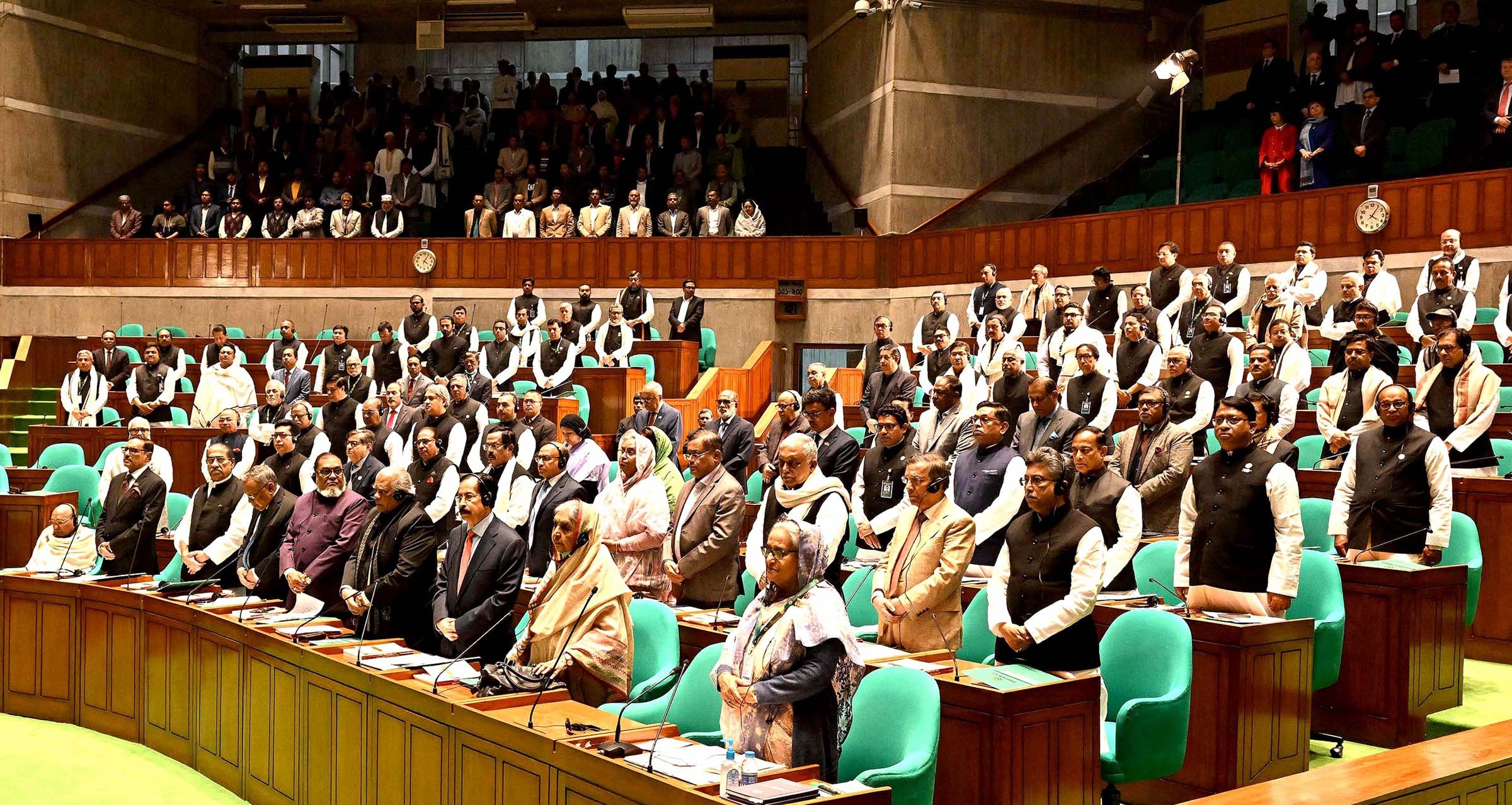
Prime Minister Sheikh Hasina at the first session of the 12th National Parliament.

=== Later developments ===
The mass uprising in Bangladesh began as a quota reform movement to reform the quota rule for government jobs, after the Supreme Court of Bangladesh invalidated the government's 2018 circular regarding job quotas in the public sector. It began in early June 2024 and was led by the Students Against Discrimination. Coinciding with the first anniversary of the Resignation of Sheikh Hasina, on 5 August 2025, the uprising received an acknowledgment with the announcement of the July Declaration.

The movement escalated into a full-fledged mass uprising after the government carried out mass killings of protesters, known as the July massacre, by late July. Amnesty International blamed the government's "heavy-handed response" for causing the death of "students, journalists, and bystanders" and demanded that the Hasina-led "government to urgently end this repression." Human Rights Watch also called on foreign governments to urge Hasina to "end the use of excessive force against protesters and hold troops to account for human rights abuses."

By early August, the movement evolved into a non-cooperation movement, ultimately leading to the resignation of Sheikh Hasina, who fled to India which triggered a constitutional crisis, leading to the formation of an interim government led by Muhammad Yunus as the chief adviser.

== Ministers ==
=== Cabinet Ministers ===
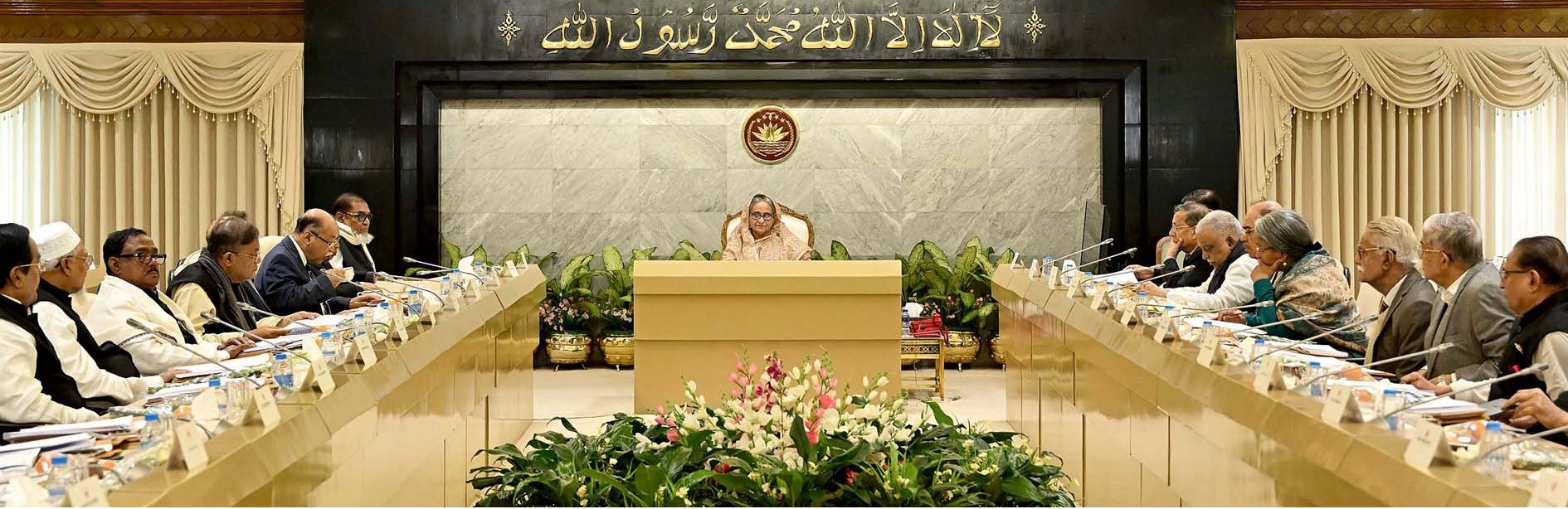
Prime Minister Sheikh Hasina presided over the first meeting of the new Cabinet at her office after winning the 12th General Election.

| Portfolio | Name | Took office | Left office | Party | Remarks |
|---|---|---|---|---|---|
| Prime Minister and also in-charge of: Cabinet Division; Ministry of Defence; Armed Forces Division; Ministry of Power, Energy and Mineral Resources | Sheikh Hasina | 11 January 2024 | 5 August 2024 | AL | |
| Ministry of Labour and Employment | Sheikh Hasina | 11 January 2024 | 1 March 2024 | AL | Prime Minister was responsible. |
| Ministry of Labour and Employment | Md. Nazrul Islam Chowdhury | 1 March 2024 | 5 August 2024 | AL | State Minister (M/C) was responsible. |
| Ministry of Cultural Affairs | Sheikh Hasina | 11 January 2024 | 1 March 2024 | AL | Prime Minister was responsible. |
| Ministry of Cultural Affairs | Naheed Ezaher Khan | 1 March 2024 | 5 August 2024 | AL | State Minister (M/C) was responsible. |
| Ministry of Liberation War Affairs | AKM Mozammel Haque | 11 January 2024 | 5 August 2024 | AL | |
| Ministry of Road Transport and Bridges | Obaidul Quader | 11 January 2024 | 5 August 2024 | AL | |
| Ministry of Finance | Abul Hassan Mahmood Ali | 11 January 2024 | 5 August 2024 | AL | |
| Ministry of Law, Justice and Parliamentary Affairs | Anisul Huq | 11 January 2024 | 5 August 2024 | AL | |
| Ministry of Industries | Nurul Majid Mahmud Humayun | 11 January 2024 | 5 August 2024 | AL | |
| Ministry of Home Affairs | Asaduzzaman Khan | 11 January 2024 | 5 August 2024 | AL | |
| Ministry of Local Government, Rural Development and Co-operatives | Tajul Islam | 11 January 2024 | 5 August 2024 | AL | |
| Ministry of Civil Aviation and Tourism | Faruk Khan | 11 January 2024 | 5 August 2024 | AL | |
| Ministry of Foreign Affairs | Hasan Mahmud | 11 January 2024 | 5 August 2024 | AL | |
| Ministry of Social Welfare | Dipu Moni | 11 January 2024 | 5 August 2024 | AL | |
| Ministry of Food | Sadhan Chandra Majumder | 11 January 2024 | 5 August 2024 | AL | |
| Ministry of Planning | Abdus Salam | 11 January 2024 | 5 August 2024 | AL | |
| Ministry of Religious Affairs | Faridul Haq Khan | 11 January 2024 | 5 August 2024 | AL | |
| Ministry of Housing and Public Works | Obaidul Muktadir Chowdhury | 11 January 2024 | 5 August 2024 | AL | |
| Ministry of Land | Narayon Chandra Chanda | 11 January 2024 | 5 August 2024 | AL | |
| Ministry of Textiles and Jute | Jahangir Kabir Nanak | 11 January 2024 | 5 August 2024 | AL | |
| Ministry of Fisheries and Livestock | Abdur Rahman | 11 January 2024 | 5 August 2024 | AL | |
| Ministry of Agriculture | Md. Abdus Shahid | 11 January 2024 | 5 August 2024 | AL | |
| Ministry of Science and Technology | Yeafesh Osman | 11 January 2024 | 5 August 2024 | AL | |
| Ministry of Health and Family Welfare | Samanta Lal Sen | 11 January 2024 | 5 August 2024 | Ind | |
| Ministry of Railways | Md. Zillul Hakim | 11 January 2024 | 5 August 2024 | AL | |
| Ministry of Public Administration | Farhad Hossain | 11 January 2024 | 5 August 2024 | AL | |
| Ministry of Youth and Sports | Nazmul Hassan | 11 January 2024 | 5 August 2024 | AL | |
| Ministry of Environment, Forest and Climate Change | Saber Hossain Chowdhury | 11 January 2024 | 5 August 2024 | AL | |
| Ministry of Education | Mohibul Hasan Chowdhury | 11 January 2024 | 5 August 2024 | AL | |

=== State Ministers (Ministry Charge) ===
| Portfolio | Name | Took office | Left office | Party |
|---|---|---|---|---|
| Ministry of Power, Energy and Mineral Resources | Nasrul Hamid (Power) | 11 January 2024 | 15 January 2024 | AL |
| Ministry of Power, Energy and Mineral Resources | Nasrul Hamid | 15 January 2024 | 5 August 2024 | AL |
| Ministry of Shipping | Khalid Mahmud Chowdhury | 11 January 2024 | 5 August 2024 | AL |
| Ministry of Posts, Telecommunications and Information Technology | Zunaid Ahmed Palak | 11 January 2024 | 5 August 2024 | AL |
| Ministry of Water Resources | Zaheed Farooque | 11 January 2024 | 5 August 2024 | AL |
| Ministry of Women and Children Affairs | Simeen Hussain Rimi | 11 January 2024 | 5 August 2024 | AL |
| Ministry of Chittagong Hill Tracts Affairs | Kujendra Lal Tripura | 11 January 2024 | 5 August 2024 | AL |
| Ministry of Disaster Management and Relief | Muhibur Rahman Muhib | 11 January 2024 | 5 August 2024 | AL |
| Ministry of Information and Broadcasting | Mohammad A. Arafat | 11 January 2024 | 5 August 2024 | AL |
| Ministry of Expatriates' Welfare and Overseas Employment | Shafiqur Rahaman Chowdhury | 11 January 2024 | 5 August 2024 | AL |
| Ministry of Primary and Mass Education | Rumana Ali | 11 January 2024 | 5 August 2024 | AL |
| Ministry of Commerce | Ahasanul Islam Titu | 11 January 2024 | 5 August 2024 | AL |

=== State Ministers ===
| Portfolio | Name | Took office | Left office | Party |
|---|---|---|---|---|
| Ministry of Planning | Shahiduzzaman Sarker | 1 March 2024 | 5 August 2024 | AL |
| Ministry of Local Government, Rural Development and Co-operatives | Abdul Wadud Dara (Rural Development and Co-operatives) | 1 March 2024 | 5 August 2024 | AL |
| Ministry of Health and Family Welfare | Rokeya Sultana | 1 March 2024 | 5 August 2024 | AL |
| Ministry of Education | Shamshun Nahar | 1 March 2024 | 5 August 2024 | AL |
| Ministry of Finance | Waseqa Ayesha Khan | 1 March 2024 | 5 August 2024 | AL |
