= Gram Police Bahini =

Bangladeshi specialized unit responsible for security in rural areas

- Region served: Bangladesh
- Official language: Bengali

Gram Police Bahini (Bengali: গ্রাম পুলিশ বাহিনী, lit. 'Village Police Force') is a Bangladeshi specialized police unit responsible for security in rural areas and providing support to the Bangladesh Police.

== History ==
In rural areas of Medieval Bengal, the villages were guarded by chaukiders who would become Gram Police Bahini. In the 1880s, law and order deteriorated in the region and the Chaukideri Act 1870 was amended through the 1892 Act 1 by the British Raj.

There are 10 personnel of Gram Police Bahini in each of the 4,562 Unions, the smallest administrative and local government units in Bangladesh.

In 2008, the Government of Bangladesh announced that members of Gram Police Bahini will be given the status of 4th class employees. In 2009, Bahini members held rallies in different districts of Bangladesh demanding they be paid the wages of 4th class employees. By 2017, they had not been included in the pay scale. Following a petition by 47 members of the unit; the Bangladesh High Court issued a ruling asking the government to explain why they had not been included in the pay scale of 4th class employees.

On 28 June 2018, National Institute of Local Government provided training to Gram Police Bahini to increase their efficiency.
