= Local Government Division =

Bangladesh government division

- স্থানীয় সরকার বিভাগ
- Government Seal of Bangladesh

Department overview
- Formed: 1972; 54 years ago
- Jurisdiction: Government of Bangladesh
- Headquarters: Bangladesh Secretariat, Agargaon, Dhaka
- Department executive: Muhammad Ibrahim, Secretary
- Parent department: Ministry of Local Government, Rural Development and Co-operatives
- Website: Local Government Division

Local Government Division (Bengali: স্থানীয় সরকার বিভাগ) is a Bangladesh government division under the Ministry of Local Government, Rural Development and Co-operatives responsible for the development and supporting local government bodies. Mohammod Ibrahim is the secretary in charge of division.

== History ==
In 2006, Transparency International Bangladesh stated in a report that the Local Government Division and Ministry of Local Government, Rural Development and Co-operatives was the most corrupt in Bangladesh. The report stated that more than 2 billion taka were misappropriated in the ministry. M Zahirul Islam, then Secretary of the Local Government Division rejected the report and said that the Minister of Local Government, Rural Development and Co-operatives, Abdul Mannan Bhuiyan, was an honest individual.

Local Government Division is the lead agency in Local Government Initiatives on Climate change, a project of the United Nations Development Programme and in partnership with United Nations Capital Development Fund, the European Union, and Swedish International Development Cooperation Agency. The initiative plans to enhance capacity and climate resilience of about 200,000 of the most vulnerable households in Bangladesh.

In 2020, during cyclone Amphan the Local Government Division established a control room to coordinate response to the cyclone. During the COVID-19 pandemic in Bangladesh, the Local Government Division suspended 89 elected local public representatives, including Union Parisad chairmen, union members, and municipal councilors, for embezzling relief materials for the outbreak. From 2012 to 2020, the Local Government Division received the largest share of the budget allotment.

== Local government bodies ==
The following are local government bodies under the Local Government Division

- Union Council
- Zila Parishad (District Council)
- Upazila Parishad
- City Corporations of Bangladesh
- Pourashava (Municipal Corporations of Bangladesh)
- Water Supply - 1 (DPHE)
- Water Supply - 2 (DWASA, CWASA)
- Water Supply - 3 (KWASA, RWASA)
