= Md. Abdur Rob =

Bangladeshi politician

Member of Bangladesh Parliament
- In office 1986–1988
- Succeeded by: Abdul Wadud Khan

Personal details
- Party: Bangladesh Awami League
- Other political affiliations: Jaitya Party

Md. Abdur Rob is a Bangladesh Awami League politician and a former member of parliament from the Chandpur-5 constituency.

== Career ==
Abdur Rob was elected to parliament from Chandpur-5 as a Jatiya Party candidate in 1986. He contested the 1991 election as a Bangladesh Awami League candidate.
