= Rural Development Academy, Gopalganj =

Research institute in Bangladesh

- Formation: 2011
- Headquarters: Gopalganj, Dhaka, Bangladesh
- Region served: Bangladesh
- Official language: Bengali
- Website: website

Rural Development Academy, Gopalganj (Bengali: পল্লী উন্নয়ন একাডেমি, গোপালগঞ্জ) is a government academy and research institute with the mandate to decrease poverty in rural areas of Bangladesh and is located in Gopalganj, Dhaka, Bangladesh.

== History ==
Bangabandhu Academy for Poverty Alleviation and Rural Development was established on 16 November 2011 by Prime Minister Sheikh Hasina. It is an autonomous body under Rural Development and Cooperative Division of the Ministry of Local Government, Rural Development and Co-operatives. It was created after the passage of Bangabandhu Poverty Alleviation and Rural Development Academy Act 2011. The BRDB Training Academy was incorporated into the Bangabandhu Academy for Poverty Alleviation and Rural Development by the government of Bangladesh.
