= Ministry of Local Government, Rural Development and Co-operatives =

Government ministry of Bangladesh

- স্থানীয় সরকার, পল্লী উন্নয়ন ও সমবায় মন্ত্রণালয়
- Government Seal of Bangladesh

Ministry overview
- Formed: 20 March 1991; 35 years ago
- Jurisdiction: Government of Bangladesh
- Headquarters: Bangladesh Secretariat, Dhaka
- Annual budget: ৳40246 crore (US$3.3 billion) (2026-2027)
- Minister responsible: Abdul Moyeen Khan
- Minister of State responsible: Mir Shahe Alam
- Ministry executives: Muhammad Ibrahim, Secretary, Local Government Division; Md. Mashiur Rahman, ndc, Secretary, Rural Development and Co-operatives Division
- Child agencies: Local Government Division; Rural Development and Co-operatives Division
- Website: lgd.gov.bd; rdcd.gov.bd

The Ministry of Local Government, Rural Development and Co-operatives (Bengali: স্থানীয় সরকার, গ্রামীন উন্নয়ন ও সমবায় মন্ত্রণালয়, romanized: Sthānīẏa Sôrkar, Grāmīn Unnôẏôn ō Sômôbāẏ Montronaloy) is a ministry of the Government of Bangladesh. It is responsible for the housing and building, regional and rural policy, municipal and cities administration and finances, and the conduct of elections.

== Organization ==
=== Local Government Division ===
==== Local Government Bodies ====
- Barishal City Corporation
- Bogura City Corporation
- Chattogram City Corporation
- Comilla City Corporation
- Dhaka North City Corporation
- Dhaka South City Corporation
- Gazipur City Corporation
- Khulna City Corporation
- Mymensingh City Corporation
- Narayanganj City Corporation
- Rajshahi City Corporation
- Rangpur City Corporation
- Sylhet City Corporation
- District Councils
- Sub-District Councils
- Union Councils
- Municipal Corporations

==== Others Department ====
- Chattogram WASA
- Dhaka WASA
- Khulna WASA
- Rajshahi WASA
- Sylhet WASA
- Public Health Engineering Department
- National Institute of Local Government
- Local Government Engineering Department
- Office of the Registrar General, Birth & Death Registration

=== Rural Development and Co-operatives Division ===
- Department of Cooperatives
- Bangladesh Rural Development Board (BRDB)
- Rural Poverty Alleviation Foundation (PDBF)
- Small Farmer Development Foundation (SFDF)
- Bangladesh Cooperative Bank
- Bangladesh dairy farmer co-operative Union Limited (Milk Vita)
- Bangladesh Academy for Rural Development (BARD)
- Rural Development Academy, Bogra
- Rural Development Academy, Gopalganj

== Ministers ==
Portrait	Minister (Birth-Death) Constituency	Term of office			Political party	Ministry	Prime Minister
Portrait	Minister (Birth-Death) Constituency	From	To	Period	Political party	Ministry	Prime Minister
Minister of Local Government, Rural Development and Co-operatives
	Abdus Salam Talukder আবদুস সালাম তালুকদার (1936–1999); MP for Jamalpur-4	20 March 1991	30 March 1996	5 years, 10 days	Bangladesh Nationalist Party	Khaleda I–II	Khaleda Zia
	Syed Ishtiaq Ahmed সৈয়দ ইশতিয়াক আহমেদ (1932–2003) (Adviser)	30 March 1996	23 June 1996	85 days	Independent	Habibur	Habibur Rahman
	Zillur Rahman জিল্লুর রহমান (1929–2013); MP for Kishoreganj-7	23 January 1996	15 July 2001	5 years, 173 days	Awami League	Hasina I	Sheikh Hasina
	Bimalendu Bikash Roy Chowdhury বিমলেন্দু বিকাশ রায় চৌধুরী (1935–2005) (Adviser)	15 July 2001	10 October 2001	87 days	Independent	Latifur	Latifur Rahman
	Abdul Mannan Bhuiyan আব্দুল মান্নান ভূঁইয়া (1943–2020); MP for Narsingdi-3	10 October 2001	29 October 2006	5 years, 19 days	Bangladesh Nationalist Party	Khaleda III	Khaleda Zia
	Inspector General of Police (Retd); M. Azizul Haq পুলিশ মহাপরিদর্শক (অবসরপ্রাপ্ত) এম. আজিজুল হক (Adviser)	29 October 2006	11 January 2007	74 days	Independent	Iajuddin	Iajuddin Ahmed
	Inspector General of Police (Retd); Anwarul Iqbal পুলিশ মহাপরিদর্শক (অবসরপ্রাপ্ত) আনোয়ারুল ইকবাল (1950–2015) (Adviser)	12 January 2007	6 January 2009	1 year, 360 days	Independent	Fakhruddin	Fakhruddin Ahmed
	Sayed Ashraful Islam সৈয়দ আশরাফুল ইসলাম (1952–2019); MP for Kishoreganj-1	6 January 2009	14 January 2014	6 years, 184 days	Awami League	Hasina II	Sheikh Hasina
	Sayed Ashraful Islam সৈয়দ আশরাফুল ইসলাম (1952–2019); MP for Kishoreganj-1	14 January 2014	9 July 2015	6 years, 184 days	Awami League	Hasina III	Sheikh Hasina
	Khandaker Mosharraf Hossain খন্দকার মোশাররফ হোসেন (born 1942); MP for Faridpur-3	9 July 2015	7 January 2019	3 years, 182 days	Awami League	Hasina III	Sheikh Hasina
	Md Tazul Islam মোঃ তাজুল ইসলাম (born 1955); MP for Comilla-9	7 January 2019	19 May 2019	132 days	Awami League	Hasina IV	Sheikh Hasina
Minister of Local Government; and Minister of Rural Development and Co-operatives
Minister of Local Government		19 May 2019	10 January 2024	4 years, 236 days	Awami League	Hasina IV	Sheikh Hasina
	Md Tazul Islam মোঃ তাজুল ইসলাম (born 1955); MP for Comilla-9	19 May 2019	10 January 2024	4 years, 236 days	Awami League	Hasina IV	Sheikh Hasina
Minister of Rural Development and Co-operatives		19 May 2019	10 January 2024	4 years, 236 days	Awami League	Hasina IV	Sheikh Hasina
	Swapan Bhattacharjee স্বপন ভট্টাচার্য (born 1952); MP for Jessore-5 (State Minister)	19 May 2019	10 January 2024	4 years, 236 days	Awami League	Hasina IV	Sheikh Hasina
Minister of Local Government		11 January 2024	9 August 2024	211 days	Awami League	Hasina V	Sheikh Hasina
	Md Tazul Islam মোঃ তাজুল ইসলাম (born 1955); MP for Comilla-9	11 January 2024	9 August 2024	211 days	Awami League	Hasina V	Sheikh Hasina
Minister of Rural Development and Co-operatives		11 January 2024	9 August 2024	211 days	Awami League	Hasina V	Sheikh Hasina
	Kazi Abdul Wadud Dara কাজী আব্দুল ওয়াদুদ দারা (born 1962); MP for Rajshahi-5 (State Minister)	11 January 2024	9 August 2024	211 days	Awami League	Hasina V	Sheikh Hasina
Minister of Local Government, Rural Development and Co-operatives
	A. F. Hassan Ariff এ. এফ. হাসান আরিফ (1941–2024) (Adviser)	9 August 2024	10 November 2024	93 days	Independent	Yunus	Muhammad Yunus
	Asif Mahmud আসিফ মাহমুদ (born 1998) (Adviser)	10 November 2024	10 December 2025	1 year, 30 days	Independent	Yunus	Muhammad Yunus
	Adilur Rahman Khan আদিলুর রহমান খান (born 1961) (Adviser)	11 December 2025	17 February 2026	68 days	Independent	Yunus	Muhammad Yunus
	Mirza Fakhrul Islam Alamgir মির্জা ফখরুল ইসলাম আলমগীর (born 1948); MP for Thakurgaon-1	17 February 2026	21 August 2026	185 days	Bangladesh Nationalist Party	Tarique	Tarique Rahman
	Abdul Moyeen Khan আব্দুল মঈন খান (born 1947); MP for Narsingdi-2	21 August 2026	Incumbent	35 days	Bangladesh Nationalist Party	Tarique	Tarique Rahman
