= Chandpur-5 =

Constituency of Bangladesh's Jatiya Sangsad

Coordinates: 23.25°N 90.85°E

- Constituency for the Jatiya Sangsad
- District: Chandpur District
- Division: Chittagong Division
- Electorate: 408,496 (2018)

Current constituency
- Created: 1984
- Party: Bangladesh Nationalist Party
- Member: Md. Mominul Haque
- ← 263 Chandpur-4 265 Feni-1 →

Chandpur-5 is a constituency represented in the Jatiya Sangsad (National Parliament) of Bangladesh since 2026 by Md. Mominul Haque of the Bangladesh Nationalist Party.

== Boundaries ==
The constituency encompasses Hajiganj and Shahrasti upazilas.

== History ==
The constituency was created in 1984 from the Comilla-23 constituency when the former Comilla District was split into three districts: Brahmanbaria, Comilla, and Chandpur.

== Members of Parliament ==
Election	Member	Party
1986	Md. Abdur Rob	Jatiya Party
1988	Abdul Wadud Khan	Jatiya Party
1991	M. A. Matin	Bangladesh Nationalist Party
Jun 1996	Rafiqul Islam	Awami League
2001	M. A. Matin	Bangladesh Nationalist Party
2008	Rafiqul Islam	Awami League
2026	Md. Mominul Haque	Bangladesh Nationalist Party

== Elections ==
=== Elections in the 2010s ===
Rafiqul Islam was re-elected unopposed in the 2014 general election after 18 parties led by the Bangladesh Nationalist Party boycotted the election citing unfair conditions for the election.

=== Elections in the 2000s ===
General Election 2008: Chandpur-5
Party	Candidate	Votes	%	±%
AL	Rafiqul Islam	143,497	56.1	+11.6
BNP	Mominul Haque	110,480	43.2	−9.0
Gano Forum	Md. Noman	839	0.3	N/A
BTF	Golam Mohammad Ali	551	0.2	N/A
KSJL	Md. Hossam Haider Patwary	298	0.1	N/A
Majority		33,017	12.9	+5.2
Turnout		255,665	86.7	+14.4
AL gain from BNP				

General Election 2001: Chandpur-5
Party	Candidate	Votes	%	±%
BNP	M. A. Matin	110,792	52.2	+11.4
AL	Rafiqul Islam	94,531	44.5	+3.4
IJOF	Md. Shafiul Alam Shwapan	5,051	2.4	N/A
BIF	Syed Md. Jahan Shah	1,404	0.7	+0.3
JSD	Md. Anowar Hossain Mollah	330	0.2	N/A
Bangladesh Progressive Party	Md. Noman	276	0.1	N/A
Majority		16,261	7.7	+7.4
Turnout		212,384	72.3	+0.4
BNP gain from AL				

=== Elections in the 1990s ===
General Election June 1996: Chandpur-5
Party	Candidate	Votes	%	±%
AL	Rafiqul Islam	62,309	41.1	+22.3
BNP	M. A. Matin	61,895	40.8	+10.7
JP(E)	Tofazzal Haidar Chowdhury	18,700	12.3	−1.8
Jamaat	Mahabubur Rahman	6,319	4.2	−1.1
IOJ	Zakaria	1,189	0.8	N/A
BIF	Md. Jalal Uddin Kashemi	663	0.4	N/A
Gano Forum	M. A. Bari	269	0.2	N/A
Zaker Party	M. A. Quaiyum Chowdhury	240	0.2	−0.1
Majority		414	0.3	−0.8
Turnout		151,584	71.9	+27.7
AL gain from BNP				

General Election 1991: Chandpur-5
Party	Candidate	Votes	%	±%
BNP	M. A. Matin	35,944	30.1	
Independent	M. A. Sattar	34,682	29.1	
AL	Md. Abdur Rob	22,389	18.8	
JP(E)	Abdul Wadud Khan	16,821	14.1	
Jamaat	Mahbubur Rahman	6,309	5.3	
FP	Shahjahan	1,003	0.8	
BKA	Zakaria	991	0.8	
Zaker Party	M. A. Quaiyum Chowdhury	412	0.3	
Bangladesh Muslim League (Kader)	Md. Abu Noman	356	0.3	
Independent	Kali Narayan Lodh	170	0.1	
Independent	A. Malek Chowdhury	156	0.1	
Jatiya Samajtantrik Dal-JSD	Anwar Hossain	139	0.1	
Majority		1,262	1.1	
Turnout		119,372	44.2	
BNP gain from JP(E)				
