= Sylhet WASA =

Service Agency

- সিলেট পানি সরবরাহ ও পয়ঃনিষ্কাশন কর্তৃপক্ষ

Agency overview
- Formed: 2 March 2022; 4 years ago
- Jurisdiction: Sylhet
- Headquarters: Sylhet
- Agency executive: Managing Director
- Parent agency: Ministry of Local Government, Rural Development and Co-operatives
- Website: sylhetwasa.portal.gov.bd

Sylhet Water Supply and Sewerage Authority, commonly known as Sylhet WASA or SWASA (Bengali: সিলেট ওয়াসা) is a Bangladesh government service agency under the Ministry of Local Government, Rural Development and Co-operatives responsible for providing water and sewerage facilities to residents of Sylhet.

Sylhet is the administrative capital of Sylhet District which was established on 3 January 1782. The government created Sylhet Division, which also includes Sylhet District, on 1 August 1995.

== History ==
The first water supply system was started in Sylhet in 1936. This system was introduced by the Sylhet Municipality under the then Ministry of Works of British India. In 1945 sewage system was added to water supply.

In 1980, the Sylhet Water Supply Master Plan project was taken under the auspices of the Department of Public Health Engineering and the Government of Netherlands. Later, to meet the needs of local people, Water Supply and Sewerage Branch was formed as a single authority for water supply and sewerage of Sylhet City Corporation area named Sylhet WASA on 2 March 2022 under an initiative of Tajul Islam, Minister of Local Government, Rural Development and Co-operatives. Originally Sylhet WASA was established under the Water Supply and Sewerage Authority Act, 1996.
