= Bangladesh Tourism Board =

National tourism organization of Bangladesh

- Formation: 2010
- Headquarters: Dhaka, Bangladesh
- Region served: Bangladesh
- Official language: Bengali
- Website: Bangladesh Tourism Board

The Bangladesh Tourism Board (Bengali: বাংলাদেশ পর্যটন বোর্ড) is the national tourism organisation of Bangladesh, responsible for promoting tourism and providing necessary training and is located in Dhaka, Bangladesh. Ms. Nuzhat Yasmin, Additional Secretary is the present CEO of the board.

== History ==
The board is a statutory body established in 2010. It is located on west Agargaon, Sher e Bangla Administrative area. It is responsible for the promotion of tourism in Bangladesh. It is under the Ministry of Civil Aviation and Tourism of Bangladesh.
