= M. A. Matin (Chandpur politician) =

Bangladeshi politician (died 2020)

Member of Parliament from Chandpur-5
- In office 1991–1996
- Preceded by: Abdul Wadud Khan
- Succeeded by: Rafiqul Islam
- In office 2001–2006
- Preceded by: Rafiqul Islam
- Succeeded by: Rafiqul Islam

Member of Parliament from Undivided Comilla-23
- In office 1979–1982

Personal details
- Died: 26 May 2020 Dhaka
- Party: Bangladesh Nationalist Party

M. A. Matin was a Bangladesh Nationalist Party politician and a former member of parliament for Comilla-23 and Chandpur-5.

== Career ==
Matin was elected to parliament from Chandpur-5 as a Bangladesh Nationalist Party candidate in 1991. He lost the 1996 election to Bangladesh Awami League candidate Rafiqul Islam. He was re-elected from Chandpur-5 in 2001.

He was elected a member of parliament from the undivided Comilla-23 constituency (present Chandpur-5) in the 1979 Bangladeshi general election.

== Death ==
M. A. Matin died on 26 May 2020.
