= Third Hasina ministry =

24th Council of Ministers of Bangladesh

- 21st Council of Ministers of the People’s Republic of Bangladesh
- 12 January 2014 – 7 January 2019
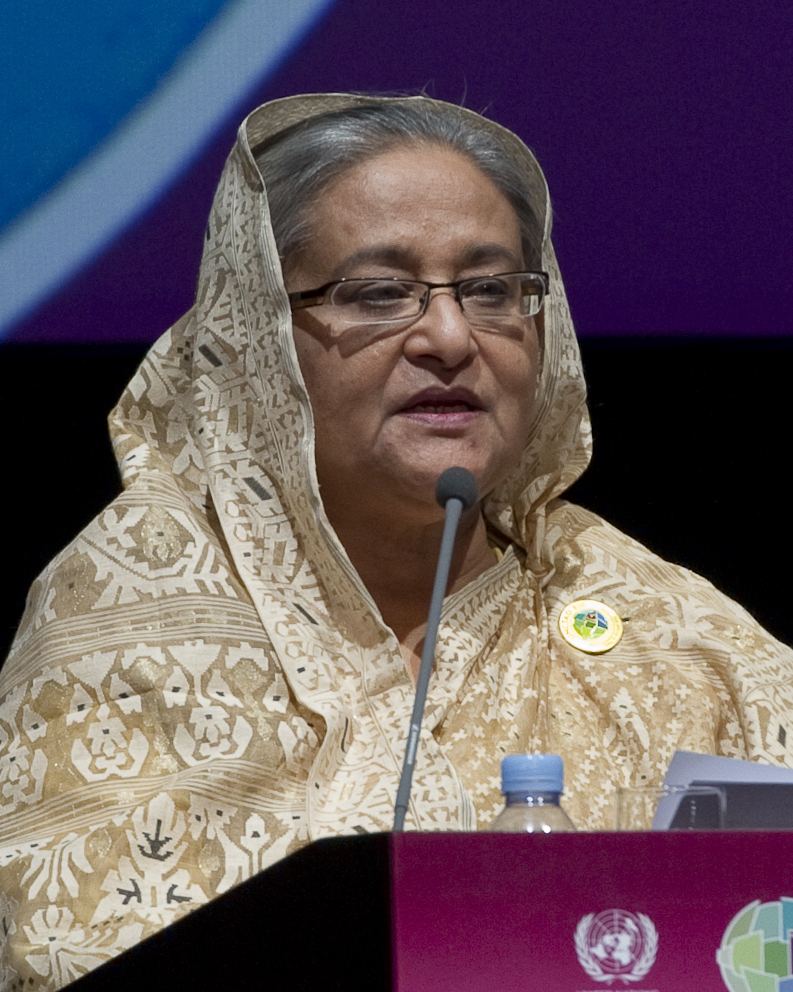
- Sheikh Hasina; Hon'ble Prime Minister of Bangladesh
- Date formed: 12 January 2014
- Date dissolved: 7 January 2019

People and organisations
- President: Mohammad Abdul Hamid
- Prime Minister: Sheikh Hasina
- Total no. of members: 57 (Including the Prime Minister)
- Member party: Awami League; Workers Party of Bangladesh; Jatiya Samajtantrik Dal; Jatiya Party (Ershad); Jatiya Party (Manju)
- Status in legislature: Coalition
- Opposition party: None
- Opposition leader: Vacant

History
- Election: 2014
- Outgoing election: 2018
- Legislature terms: 4 years, 360 days
- Incoming formation: 10th Jatiya Sangsad
- Outgoing formation: 11th Jatiya Sangsad
- Predecessor: Hasina II
- Successor: Hasina IV

The Third Hasina ministry was the cabinet of the People‘s Republic of Bangladesh headed by Sheikh Hasina that was formed after the 2014 general election which was held on 5 January 2014. The Awami League was assured of victory, with its candidates declared victors in 127 of the 154 uncontested seats by default. The elected MPs and Cabinet were sworn in on 9 January.

== Ministers ==
=== Cabinet ministers ===
Portfolio	Name	Took office	Left office	Party	Remarks
Prime Minister and also in-charge of: Armed Forces Division; Cabinet Division; Ministry of Defence; All important policy issues; and All other portfolios not allocated to any Minister.	Sheikh Hasina	12 January 2014	7 January 2019	AL	
Ministry of Public Administration	Sheikh Hasina	12 January 2014	16 July 2015	AL	Prime Minister was responsible.
Ministry of Public Administration	Syed Ashraful Islam	16 July 2015	3 January 2019	AL	Died in Office.
Ministry of Finance	Abul Maal Abdul Muhith	12 January 2014	7 January 2019	AL	
Ministry of Industries	Amir Hossain Amu	12 January 2014	7 January 2019	AL	
Ministry of Commerce	Tofail Ahmed	12 January 2014	7 January 2019	AL	
Ministry of Agriculture	Matia Chowdhury	12 January 2014	7 January 2019	AL	
Ministry of Posts and Telecommunications; Ministry of Information and Communication Technology	Abdul Latif Siddiqui	12 January 2014	11 February 2014	AL	Merged as Ministry of Posts, Telecommunications and Information Technology
Ministry of Posts, Telecommunications and Information Technology	Abdul Latif Siddiqui	11 February 2014	12 October 2014	AL	Expelled.
Ministry of Posts, Telecommunications and Information Technology	Sheikh Hasina	12 October 2014	3 January 2018	AL	Prime Minister was responsible.
Ministry of Posts, Telecommunications and Information Technology	Mustafa Jabbar	3 January 2018	10 December 2018	Ind	Resigned.
Ministry of Posts, Telecommunications and Information Technology	Sheikh Hasina	10 December 2018	7 January 2019	AL	Prime Minister was responsible.
Ministry of Health and Family Welfare	Mohammed Nasim	12 January 2014	7 January 2019	AL	
Ministry of Local Government, Rural Development and Co-operatives	Syed Ashraful Islam	12 January 2014	9 July 2015	AL	
Ministry of Local Government, Rural Development and Co-operatives	Khandaker Mosharraf Hossain	9 July 2015	7 January 2019	AL	
Ministry of Expatriates' Welfare and Overseas Employment	Khandaker Mosharraf Hossain	12 January 2014	14 July 2015	AL	
Ministry of Expatriates' Welfare and Overseas Employment	Nurul Islam	14 July 2015	10 December 2018	AL	
Ministry of Expatriates' Welfare and Overseas Employment	Khandaker Mosharraf Hossain	10 December 2018	7 January 2019	AL	
Ministry of Civil Aviation and Tourism	Rashed Khan Menon	12 January 2014	3 January 2018	WPB	
Ministry of Civil Aviation and Tourism	A. K. M. Shahjahan Kamal	3 January 2018	7 January 2019	AL	
Ministry of Religious Affairs	Motiur Rahman	12 January 2014	10 December 2018	AL	
Ministry of Religious Affairs	AKM Mozammel Haque	10 December 2018	7 January 2019	AL	
Ministry of Housing and Public Works	Mosharraf Hossain	12 January 2014	7 January 2019	AL	
Ministry of Liberation War Affairs	AKM Mozammel Haque	12 January 2014	7 January 2019	AL	
Ministry of Fisheries and Livestock	Mohammad Sayedul Haque	12 January 2014	16 December 2017	AL	Died in Office.
Ministry of Fisheries and Livestock	Narayon Chandra Chanda	16 December 2017	3 January 2018	AL	State Minister (M/C) was responsible.
Ministry of Fisheries and Livestock	Narayon Chandra Chanda	3 January 2018	7 January 2019	AL	
Ministry of Textiles and Jute	Emaz Uddin Pramanik	12 January 2014	7 January 2019	AL	
Ministry of Communications	Obaidul Quader	12 January 2014	3 September 2014	AL	Renamed as Ministry of Road Transport and Bridges.
Ministry of Road Transport and Bridges	Obaidul Quader	3 September 2014	7 January 2019	AL	
Ministry of Information	Hasanul Haq Inu	12 January 2014	7 January 2019	JSD	
Ministry of Water Resources	Anisul Islam Mahmud	12 January 2014	3 January 2018	JP (E)	
Ministry of Water Resources	Anwar Hossain Manju	3 January 2018	7 January 2019	JP (M)	
Ministry of Environment and Forest	Anwar Hossain Manju	12 January 2014	3 January 2018	JP (M)	
Ministry of Environment and Forest	Anisul Islam Mahmud	3 January 2018	20 June 2018	JP (E)	Renamed as Ministry of Environment, Forest and Climate Change.
Ministry of Environment, Forest and Climate Change	Anisul Islam Mahmud	20 June 2018	7 January 2019	JP (E)	
Ministry of Education	Nurul Islam Nahid	12 January 2014	7 January 2019	AL	
Ministry of Shipping	Shajahan Khan	12 January 2014	7 January 2019	AL	
Ministry of Law, Justice and Parliamentary Affairs	Anisul Huq	12 January 2014	7 January 2019	AL	
Ministry of Disaster Management and Relief	Mofazzal Hossain Chowdhury	12 January 2014	7 January 2019	AL	
Ministry of Railways	Mujibul Haque Mujib	12 January 2014	7 January 2019	AL	
Ministry of Planning	Mustafa Kamal	12 January 2014	7 January 2019	AL	
Ministry of Primary and Mass Education	Mostafizur Rahman Fizar	12 January 2014	7 January 2019	AL	
Ministry of Cultural Affairs	Asaduzzaman Noor	12 January 2014	7 January 2019	AL	
Ministry of Social Welfare	Syed Mohsin Ali	12 January 2014	14 September 2015	AL	Died in Office.
Ministry of Social Welfare	Promode Mankin	14 September 2015	11 May 2016	AL	State Minister (M/C) was responsible. Died in Office.
Ministry of Social Welfare	Sheikh Hasina	11 May 2016	19 June 2016	AL	Prime Minister was responsible.
Ministry of Social Welfare	Nuruzzaman Ahmed	19 June 2016	3 January 2018	AL	State Minister (M/C) was responsible.
Ministry of Social Welfare	Rashed Khan Menon	3 January 2018	7 January 2019	WPB	
Ministry of Land	Shamsur Rahman Sherif	12 January 2014	7 January 2019	AL	
Ministry of Food	Qamrul Islam	12 January 2014	7 January 2019	AL	
Ministry of Science and Technology	Yeafesh Osman	12 January 2014	14 July 2015	AL	State Minister (M/C) was responsible.
Ministry of Science and Technology	Yeafesh Osman	14 July 2015	10 December 2018	AL	Resigned.
Ministry of Science and Technology	Sheikh Hasina	10 December 2018	7 January 2019	AL	Prime Minister was responsible.
Ministry of Home Affairs	Asaduzzaman Khan	12 January 2014	14 July 2015	AL	State Minister (M/C) was responsible.
Ministry of Home Affairs	Asaduzzaman Khan	14 July 2015	7 January 2019	AL	
Ministry of Foreign Affairs	Shahriar Alam	12 January 2014	26 February 2014	AL	State Minister (M/C) was responsible.
Ministry of Foreign Affairs	Abul Hassan Mahmood Ali	26 February 2014	7 January 2019	AL	
Ministry of Without Portfolio	Syed Ashraful Islam	9 July 2015	16 July 2015	AL	

=== State Ministers (Ministry Charge) ===
Portfolio	Name	Took office	Left office	Party
Ministry of Labour and Employment	Mujibul Haque Chunnu	12 January 2014	7 January 2019	JP (E)
Ministry of Chittagong Hill Tracts Affairs	Ushwe Sing	12 January 2014	7 January 2019	AL
Ministry of Youth and Sports	Biren Sikder	12 January 2014	7 January 2019	AL
Ministry of Women and Children Affairs	Meher Afroz Chumki	12 January 2014	7 January 2019	AL
Ministry of Power, Energy and Mineral Resources	Nasrul Hamid (Power)	12 January 2014	26 January 2014	AL
Ministry of Power, Energy and Mineral Resources	Nasrul Hamid	26 January 2014	7 January 2019	AL
Ministry of Posts, Telecommunications and Information Technology	Zunaid Ahmed Palak (Information and Communication Technology)	12 October 2014	3 January 2018	AL
Ministry of Posts, Telecommunications and Information Technology	Tarana Halim (Posts and Telecommunications)	14 July 2015	3 January 2018	AL

=== State Ministers ===
Portfolio	Name	Took office	Left office	Party	Remarks
Ministry of Finance	M. A. Mannan	12 January 2014	7 January 2019	AL	
Ministry of Textiles and Jute	Mirza Azam	12 January 2014	7 January 2019	AL	
Ministry of Social Welfare	Promode Mankin	12 January 2014	14 September 2015	AL	
Ministry of Social Welfare	Nuruzzaman Ahmed	3 January 2018	7 January 2019	AL	
Ministry of Fisheries and Livestock	Narayon Chandra Chanda	12 January 2014	16 December 2017	AL	
Ministry of Land	Saifuzzaman Chowdhury	12 January 2014	7 January 2019	AL	
Ministry of Primary and Mass Education	Ismat Ara Sadek	12 January 2014	15 January 2014	AL	
Ministry of Local Government, Rural Development and Co-operatives	Mashiur Rahaman Ranga (Rural Development and Co-operatives)	12 January 2014	7 January 2019	JP (E)	
Ministry of Health and Family Welfare	Zahid Maleque	12 January 2014	7 January 2019	AL	
Ministry of Information and Communication Technology	Zunaid Ahmed Palak	12 January 2014	11 February 2014	AL	Merged as Ministry of Posts, Telecommunications and Information Technology.
Ministry of Public Administration	Ismat Ara Sadek	15 January 2014	7 January 2019	AL	
Ministry of Posts, Telecommunications and Information Technology	Zunaid Ahmed Palak (Information and Communication Technology)	11 February 2014	12 October 2014	AL	
Ministry of Posts, Telecommunications and Information Technology	Zunaid Ahmed Palak (Information and Communication Technology)	3 January 2018	7 January 2019	AL	
Ministry of Water Resources	Muhammad Nazrul Islam	26 February 2014	7 January 2019	AL	
Ministry of Foreign Affairs	Shahriar Alam	26 February 2014	7 January 2019	AL	
Ministry of Planning	M. A. Mannan	8 April 2014	7 January 2019	AL	
Ministry of Food	Nuruzzaman Ahmed	14 July 2015	19 June 2016	AL	
Ministry of Information	Tarana Halim	3 January 2018	7 January 2019	AL	
Ministry of Education	Kazi Keramat Ali (Technical and Madrasah Education)	3 January 2018	7 January 2019	AL	

=== Deputy Ministers ===
Portfolio	Name	Took office	Left office	Party	Remarks
Ministry of Water Resources	Abdullah Al Islam Jakob	12 January 2014	26 February 2014	AL	
Ministry of Youth and Sports	Arif Khan Joy	12 January 2014	7 January 2019	AL	
Ministry of Environment and Forest	Abdullah Al Islam Jakob	26 February 2014	20 June 2018	AL	Renamed as Ministry of Environment, Forest and Climate Change.
Ministry of Environment, Forest and Climate Change	Abdullah Al Islam Jakob	20 June 2018	7 January 2019	AL	

== See also ==
- List of Bangladeshi governments
