= Directorate General of Food =

Bangladesh government department

- Formation: 1943
- Headquarters: Dhaka, Bangladesh
- Region served: Bangladesh
- Official language: Bengali
- Website: Directorate General of Food

The Directorate General of Food is a department of the government of Bangladesh, and is located in Dhaka. It is responsible for the overall management of food supply in Bangladesh.

== History ==
The Directorate General of Food traces its origins to the Food Department created in 1943 after the 1943 Bengal Famine. In 1955 the government of East Pakistan tried to abolish the department and place its responsibilities under the Department of Agriculture. Its operations were suspended for seven months, but the merger didn't happen.

After the Independence of Bangladesh, the Ministry of Food & Civil supplies was created, of which the Directorate General of Food was a department. The Directorate is now part of the Ministry of Food, which was created as part of a government reorganisation in 2012.

== Activities ==
Overseeing the management and administration of the nation's food supply. Enforcing the National Food Policy. Establishing a dependable national food security system. Creating a continuous supply chain for essential food crops. Executing and supervising various development projects in the food industry. Monitoring the food supply status of the country. Collecting and distributing food items such as sugar, edible oil, and salt. Guaranteeing the distribution of food products through rationing and other channels. Maintaining stable market prices for food items. Ensuring the quantity and quality of stored food. Addressing topics related to food budgeting, accounting, finance, planning, research, and monitoring. Supporting food producers.
