= Chattogram WASA =

Water and sewage authority for Chittagong, Bangladesh

- চট্টগ্রাম পানি সরবরাহ ও পয়ঃনিষ্কাশন কর্তৃপক্ষ
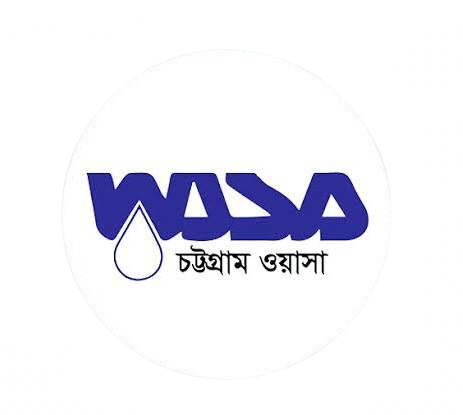
- Seal of Chattogram WASA

Agency overview
- Formed: 1976; 50 years ago
- Jurisdiction: Chattogram
- Headquarters: Wasa Bhavan, Dampara, Chittagong
- Agency executive: Muhammad Anwar Pasha, Managing Director
- Parent agency: Ministry of Local Government, Rural Development and Co-operatives
- Website: Chattogram WASA

Chattogram Water Supply and Sewerage Authority, commonly known as Chattogram WASA (Bengali: চট্টগ্রাম ওয়াসা), is a Bangladesh government service organization under the jurisdiction of the Local Government Division of the Ministry of Local Government, Rural Development and Co-operatives. It is responsible for the supply of potable water and management of sewerage services for the residents of Chattogram.

== History ==
Chattogram Water Supply and Sewerage Authority was established in 1963. In 1996, through the passage of Water and Sewerage Authority Act, the authority was reformed and renamed to Water and Sewerage Authority. Through it is mandated to provide sewage and water supply to Chittagong City, it currently only provides water while sewage services are provided by Chittagong City Corporation. In 2019, WASA was losing 90 million taka per year in revenue due to illegal extraction of water.

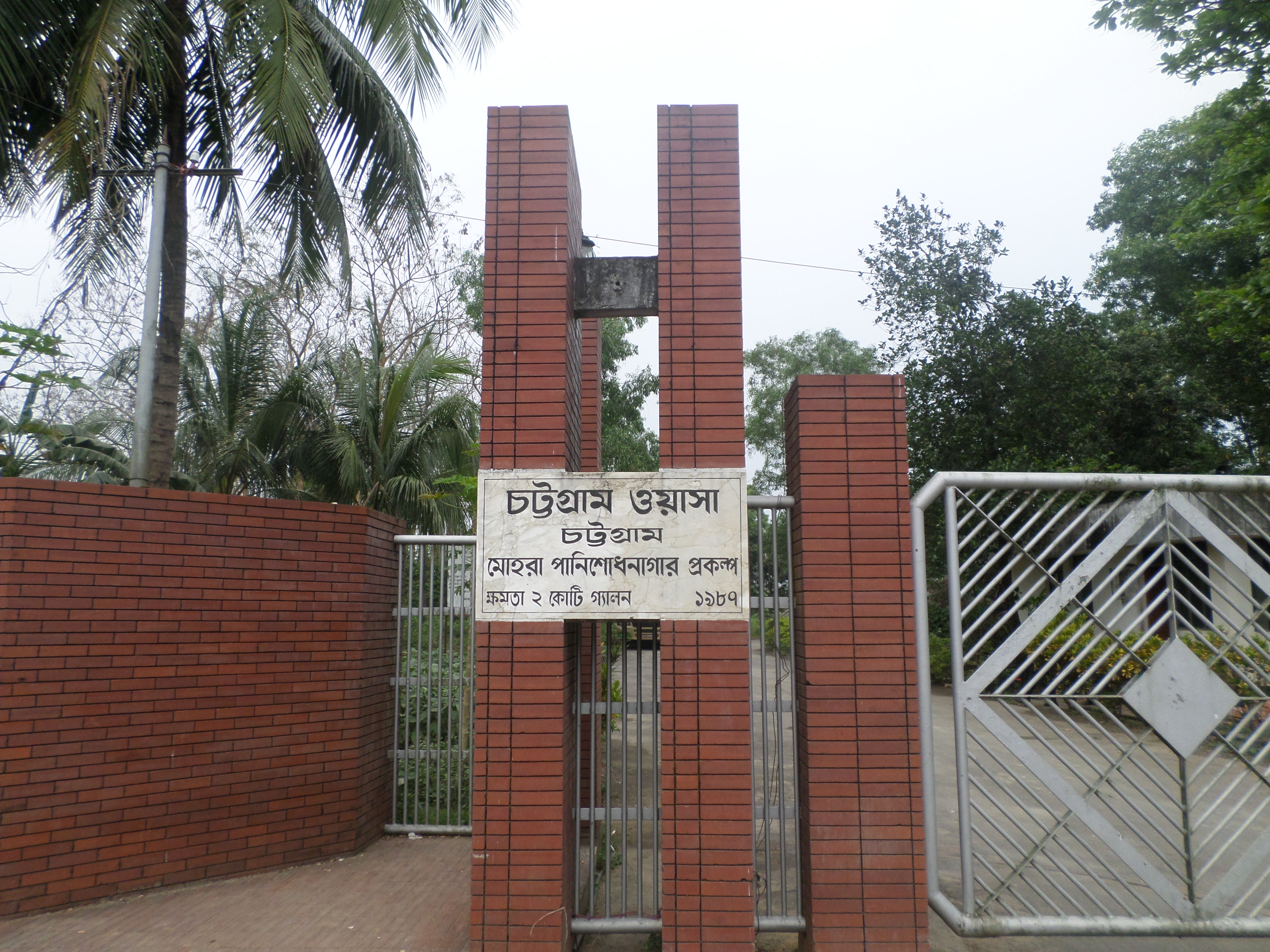
Mohara water treatment plant of Chattogram WASA

Chattogram WASA opened a call center in March 2019 for its customers. On 2 April 2019, the Chattogram WASA announced plans to install two hundred fire hydrants financed by Japan International Cooperation Agency.

=== Criticism ===
Chattogram WASA has faced criticism for water loss along the pipelines and shortage of supplies as a result. The water supply system lost almost 40 percent of the water it carried in 2010. In January 2017, WASA pipelines had 250 leaks which were yet to be repaired. Chittagong city also experiences flooding due to the mismanagement of water.
