= Abdul Wadud Khan =

Bangladeshi politician

Member of Bangladesh Parliament
- In office 1988–1991
- Preceded by: Md. Abdur Rob
- Succeeded by: M. A. Matin

Personal details
- Party: Jatiya Party (Ershad)

Abdul Wadud Khan is a Jatiya Party (Ershad) politician and a former member of parliament from Rajshahi-5 constituency.

== Career ==
Khan was elected to parliament from Rajshahi-5 as a Jatiya Party candidate in 1988. He lost the 1991 election to Bangladesh Nationalist Party candidate, M. A. Matin.
