= National Institute of Local Government =

Research institute in Bangladesh

- স্থানীয় সরকার জাতীয় ইনস্টিটিউট
- Government of Bangladesh Seal

Agency overview
- Formed: 1980; 46 years ago
- Jurisdiction: Government of Bangladesh
- Headquarters: Dhaka, Bangladesh
- Agency executive: Saleh Ahmad Mozaffar, Director General
- Parent department: Ministry of Local Government, Rural Development and Co-operatives
- Website: nilg.gov.bd

The National Institute of Local Government (Bengali: জাতীয় স্থানীয় সরকার ইনস্টিটিউট) is a government training and research institute that is responsible for training officials, both elected and appointed, of local government in Bangladesh and is located in Agargaon, Dhaka, Bangladesh. It is under the Local Government Division of the Ministry of Local Government, Rural Development and Co-operatives.

== History ==
In 1965, the government of Pakistan decided to establish a local government training institute in East Pakistan. A United States Agency for International Development consultant was appointed in 1967 to do a feasibility study. On 1 July 1969, the government of Pakistan established the Local government institute. The government of Bangladesh reformed the local government institute into the National Institute of Local Government in 1980. It is governed by a board of directors formed under National Institute of Local Government Law, 1992.
