= Second Hasina ministry =

23rd Council of Ministers of Bangladesh

- Government of Bangladesh
- 6 January 2009 – 12 January 2014
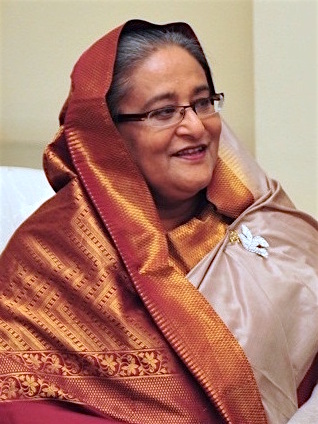
- Hasina in 2011
- Date formed: 6 January 2009
- Date dissolved: 12 January 2014

People and organisations
- President: Iajuddin Ahmed
- Prime Minister: Sheikh Hasina
- Total no. of members: 62
- Member party: Awami League; Jatiya Party (Ershad); Workers Party of Bangladesh; Jatiya Samajtantrik Dal; Bangladesh Samyabadi Dal (Barua)
- Status in legislature: Coalition
- Opposition party: Bangladesh Nationalist Party
- Opposition leader: Khaleda Zia

History
- Election: 2008 general election
- Outgoing election: 2014 general election
- Legislature term: 2009–2014
- Predecessor: Fakhruddin Ahmed ministry
- Successor: Third Hasina ministry

The second Hasina ministry was the government of Bangladesh during the 9th legislative session of the Jatiya Sangsad following the 2008 general election, and serving from 6 January 2009 until 12 January 2014.

== Ministers ==
=== Cabinet ministers ===
Portfolio	Name	Took office	Left office	Party	Remarks
Prime Minister and also in-charge of: Armed Forces Division; Cabinet Division; Ministry of Defence; All important policy issues; and All other portfolios not allocated to any Minister.	Sheikh Hasina	6 January 2009	12 January 2014	AL	
Ministry of Establishment	Sheikh Hasina	6 January 2009	28 April 2011	AL	Prime Minister was responsible. Renamed as Ministry of Public Administration.
Ministry of Public Administration	Sheikh Hasina	28 April 2011	12 January 2014	AL	Prime Minister was responsible.
Ministry of Power, Energy and Mineral Resources	Sheikh Hasina	6 January 2009	24 January 2009	AL	Prime Minister was responsible.
Ministry of Power, Energy and Mineral Resources	Shamsul Haque Tuku	24 January 2009	31 July 2009	AL	State Minister (M/C) was responsible.
Ministry of Power, Energy and Mineral Resources	Enamul Huq	31 July 2009	21 November 2013	AL	State Minister (M/C) was responsible.
Ministry of Power, Energy and Mineral Resources	Sheikh Hasina	21 November 2013	12 January 2014	AL	Prime Minister was responsible.
Ministry of Housing and Public Works	Sheikh Hasina	6 January 2009	24 January 2009	AL	Prime Minister was responsible.
Ministry of Housing and Public Works	Abdul Mannan Khan	24 January 2009	21 November 2013	AL	State Minister (M/C) was responsible.
Ministry of Housing and Public Works	Tofail Ahmed	21 November 2013	12 January 2014	AL	
Ministry of Religious Affairs	Sheikh Hasina	6 January 2009	24 January 2009	AL	Prime Minister was responsible.
Ministry of Religious Affairs	Shahjahan Mia	24 January 2009	21 November 2013	AL	State Minister (M/C) was responsible.
Ministry of Religious Affairs	Mujibul Haque Mujib	21 November 2013	12 January 2014	AL	
Ministry of Women and Children Affairs	Sheikh Hasina	6 January 2009	31 July 2009	AL	Prime Minister was responsible.
Ministry of Women and Children Affairs	Shirin Sharmin Chaudhury	31 July 2009	30 April 2013	AL	State Minister (M/C) was responsible. Resigned.
Ministry of Women and Children Affairs	Sheikh Hasina	30 April 2013	2 June 2013	AL	Prime Minister was responsible.
Ministry of Women and Children Affairs	Meher Afroz Chumki	2 June 2013	21 November 2013	AL	State Minister (M/C) was responsible.
Ministry of Women and Children Affairs	Salma Islam	21 November 2013	12 January 2014	JP	State Minister (M/C) was responsible.
Ministry of Finance	Abul Maal Abdul Muhith	6 January 2009	12 January 2014	AL	
Ministry of Agriculture	Matia Chowdhury	6 January 2009	12 January 2014	AL	
Ministry of Textiles and Jute	Abdul Latif Siddiqui	6 January 2009	12 January 2014	AL	
Ministry of Law, Justice and Parliamentary Affairs	Shafique Ahmed	6 January 2009	21 November 2013	AL	
Ministry of Law, Justice and Parliamentary Affairs	Qamrul Islam	21 November 2013	12 January 2014	AL	State Minister (M/C) was responsible.
Ministry of Planning	A. K. Khandker	6 January 2009	12 January 2014	AL	
Ministry of Posts and Telecommunications	Rajiuddin Ahmed Raju	6 January 2009	15 September 2012	AL	
Ministry of Posts and Telecommunications	Sahara Khatun	15 September 2012	21 November 2013	AL	
Ministry of Posts and Telecommunications	Rashed Khan Menon	21 November 2013	12 January 2014	WPB	
Ministry of Home Affairs	Sahara Khatun	6 January 2009	15 September 2012	AL	
Ministry of Home Affairs	Muhiuddin Khan Alamgir	15 September 2012	21 November 2013	AL	
Ministry of Home Affairs	Shamsul Haque Tuku	21 November 2013	12 January 2014	AL	State Minister (M/C) was responsible.
Ministry of Local Government, Rural Development and Co-operatives	Syed Ashraful Islam	6 January 2009	12 January 2014	AL	
Ministry of Labour and Employment	Khandaker Mosharraf Hossain	6 January 2009	15 September 2012	AL	
Ministry of Labour and Employment	Rajiuddin Ahmed Raju	15 September 2012	21 November 2013	AL	
Ministry of Labour and Employment	Khandaker Mosharraf Hossain	21 November 2013	12 January 2014	AL	
Ministry of Expatriates' Welfare and Overseas Employment	Khandaker Mosharraf Hossain	6 January 2009	12 January 2014	AL	
Ministry of Land	Rezaul Karim Hira	6 January 2009	21 November 2013	AL	
Ministry of Land	Amir Hossain Amu	21 November 2013	12 January 2014	AL	
Ministry of Information	Abul Kalam Azad	6 January 2009	15 September 2012	AL	
Ministry of Information	Hasanul Haq Inu	15 September 2012	12 January 2014	JSD	
Ministry of Cultural Affairs	Abul Kalam Azad	6 January 2009	21 November 2013	AL	
Ministry of Cultural Affairs	Hasanul Haq Inu	21 November 2013	12 January 2014	JSD	
Ministry of Social Welfare	Enamul Haque Mostafa Shahid	6 January 2009	21 November 2013	AL	
Ministry of Social Welfare	Promode Mankin	21 November 2013	12 January 2014	AL	State Minister (M/C) was responsible.
Ministry of Industries	Dilip Barua	6 January 2009	21 November 2013	BSD	
Ministry of Industries	Tofail Ahmed	21 November 2013	12 January 2014	AL	
Ministry of Water Resources	Ramesh Chandra Sen	6 January 2009	21 November 2013	AL	
Ministry of Water Resources	Anisul Islam Mahmud	21 November 2013	12 January 2014	JP	
Ministry of Civil Aviation and Tourism	GM Quader	6 January 2009	5 December 2011	JP	
Ministry of Civil Aviation and Tourism	Faruk Khan	5 December 2011	21 November 2013	AL	
Ministry of Civil Aviation and Tourism	Ruhul Amin Howlader	21 November 2013	12 January 2014	JP	
Ministry of Commerce	Faruk Khan	6 January 2009	5 December 2011	AL	
Ministry of Commerce	GM Quader	5 December 2011	12 January 2014	JP	
Ministry of Communications	Syed Abul Hossain	6 January 2009	5 December 2011	AL	
Ministry of Communications	Obaidul Quader	5 December 2011	12 January 2014	AL	
Ministry of Food and Disaster Management	Mohammad Abdur Razzaque	6 January 2009	15 September 2012	AL	Split as Ministry of Food and Ministry of Disaster Management and Relief
Ministry of Food	Mohammad Abdur Razzaque	15 September 2012	21 November 2013	AL	
Ministry of Food	Ramesh Chandra Sen	21 November 2013	12 January 2014	AL	
Ministry of Disaster Management and Relief	Abul Hassan Mahmood Ali	15 September 2012	21 November 2013	AL	
Ministry of Disaster Management and Relief	Amir Hossain Amu	21 November 2013	12 January 2014	AL	
Ministry of Shipping	Afsarul Ameen	6 January 2009	31 July 2009	AL	
Ministry of Shipping	Shajahan Khan	31 July 2009	12 January 2014	AL	
Ministry of Health and Family Welfare	AFM Ruhal Haque	6 January 2009	21 November 2013	AL	
Ministry of Health and Family Welfare	Rowshan Ershad	21 November 2013	12 January 2014	JP	
Ministry of Foreign Affairs	Dipu Moni	6 January 2009	21 November 2013	AL	
Ministry of Foreign Affairs	Abul Hassan Mahmood Ali	21 November 2013	12 January 2014	AL	
Ministry of Education	Nurul Islam Nahid	6 January 2009	12 January 2014	AL	
Ministry of Primary and Mass Education	Nurul Islam Nahid	6 January 2009	31 July 2009	AL	
Ministry of Primary and Mass Education	Afsarul Ameen	31 July 2009	21 November 2013	AL	
Ministry of Primary and Mass Education	Nurul Islam Nahid	21 November 2013	12 January 2014	AL	
Ministry of Fisheries and Livestock	Abdul Latif Biswas	6 January 2009	21 November 2013	AL	
Ministry of Fisheries and Livestock	Matia Chowdhury	21 November 2013	12 January 2014	AL	
Ministry of Liberation War Affairs	A. B. Tajul Islam	6 January 2009	21 November 2013	AL	State Minister (M/C) was responsible.
Ministry of Liberation War Affairs	Shajahan Khan	21 November 2013	12 January 2014	AL	
Ministry of Science and ICT	Yeafesh Osman	6 January 2009	5 December 2011	AL	State Minister (M/C) was responsible. Split as Ministry of Science and Technology and Ministry of Information and Communication Technology.
Ministry of Science and Technology	Yeafesh Osman	5 December 2011	21 November 2013	AL	State Minister (M/C) was responsible.
Ministry of Science and Technology	Abdul Latif Siddiqui	21 November 2013	12 January 2014	AL	
Ministry of Information and Communication Technology	Syed Abul Hossain	5 December 2011	23 July 2012	AL	Resigned.
Ministry of Information and Communication Technology	Sheikh Hasina	23 July 2012	15 September 2012	AL	Prime Minister was responsible.
Ministry of Information and Communication Technology	Mostafa Faruk Mohammad	15 September 2012	21 November 2013	AL	
Ministry of Environment and Forest	Mostafizur Rahman Fizar	6 January 2009	31 July 2009	AL	State Minister (M/C) was responsible.
Ministry of Environment and Forest	Hasan Mahmud	31 July 2009	28 November 2011	AL	State Minister (M/C) was responsible.
Ministry of Environment and Forest	Hasan Mahmud	28 November 2011	12 January 2014	AL	
Ministry of Railways	Suranjit Sengupta	5 December 2011	17 April 2012	AL	
Ministry of Railways	Obaidul Quader	17 April 2012	15 September 2012	AL	
Ministry of Railways	Mujibul Haque Mujib	15 September 2012	12 January 2014	AL	
Ministry of Without Portfolio	Suranjit Sengupta	17 April 2012	21 November 2013	AL	Resigned in Office.

=== State Ministers (Ministry Charge) ===
Portfolio	Name	Took office	Left office	Party	Remarks
Ministry of Youth and Sports	Ahad Ali Sarker	6 January 2009	21 November 2013	AL	
Ministry of Youth and Sports	Mujibul Haque Chunnu	21 November 2013	12 January 2014	JP	

=== State Ministers ===
Portfolio	Name	Took office	Left office	Party	Remarks
Ministry of Home Affairs	Sohel Taj	6 January 2009	31 May 2009 (Note: He wanted to resign, but the President did not accept his resignation.)	AL	
Ministry of Home Affairs	Shamsul Haque Tuku	31 July 2009	21 November 2013	AL	
Ministry of Foreign Affairs	Hasan Mahmud	6 January 2009	31 July 2009	AL	
Ministry of Labour and Employment	Monnujan Sufian	6 January 2009	12 January 2014	AL	
Ministry of Law, Justice and Parliamentary Affairs	Qamrul Islam	24 January 2009	21 November 2013	AL	
Ministry of Local Government, Rural Development and Co-operatives	Jahangir Kabir Nanak	24 January 2009	21 November 2013	AL	
Ministry of Primary and Mass Education	Motahar Hossain	24 January 2009	21 November 2013	AL	
Ministry of Land	Mostafizur Rahman Fizar	31 July 2009	21 November 2013	AL	
Ministry of Health and Family Welfare	Mozibur Rahman Fakir	31 July 2009	21 November 2013	AL	
Ministry of Cultural Affairs	Promode Mankin	31 July 2009	15 September 2012	AL	
Ministry of Water Resources	Mahbubur Rahman	31 July 2009	21 November 2013	AL	
Ministry of Social Welfare	Promode Mankin	15 September 2012	21 November 2013	AL	
Ministry of Industries	Omor Faruk Chowdhury	15 September 2012	21 November 2013	AL	
Ministry of Fisheries and Livestock	Abdul Hyee	15 September 2012	21 November 2013	AL	
Ministry of Without Portfolio	Sohel Taj	31 May 2009	7 July 2012	AL	Resigned. (Note: He resigned as a member of parliament.)
