= Rajshahi WASA =

Service Agency

- রাজশাহী পানি সরবরাহ ও পয়ঃনিষ্কাশন কর্তৃপক্ষ

Agency overview
- Formed: 10 March 2011; 15 years ago
- Jurisdiction: Rajshahi
- Headquarters: Wasa Bhavan, Shalbagan, Rajshahi
- Agency executive: Managing Director
- Parent agency: Ministry of Local Government, Rural Development and Co-operatives
- Website: rajshahiwasa.portal.gov.bd

Rajshahi Water Supply and Sewerage Authority, commonly known as Rajshahi WASA or RWASA (Bengali: রাজশাহী ওয়াসা) is a Bangladesh government service agency under the Ministry of Local Government, Rural Development and Co-operatives responsible for providing water and sewerage facilities to residents of Rajshahi.

== History ==
The first water supply system in Rajshahi was installed in 1937 under the municipality corporation management.

Rajshahi WASA started operations on 10 March 2011.

The government of Bangladesh signed an agreement with China to finance the building of a surface water purification plant for Rajshahi WASA in 2014. The project was significantly delayed and the government identified it as a priority for 2018.

In October 2018, the Executive Committee of the National Economic Council approved 40.65 billion taka for the construction of a water purifying plant that will have a 200 million liter of water per day. The government sought a loan of US$276 million from China to build the plant for WASA in 2020. I eventually signed an agreement with a Chinese company to build the purification plant.

Rajshahi WASA built water booths financed by Deutsche Gesellschaft für Internationale Zusammenarbeit. The booths allow access to clean water to consumers and are managed by a US based nonprofit, Drinkwell.

Rajshahi WASA tripped their rates for water on 1 February 2022 as per decision of Managing Director Md Zakir Hossain. This decision faced criticism based on the poor quality water supplied by the agency. It signed an agreement with Rajshahi Krishi Unnayan Bank so that its customers can pay their bills at the bank.
