= Department of Public Health Engineering =

Government agency in Bangladesh

- Formation: 1936
- Headquarters: Dhaka, Bangladesh
- Region served: Bangladesh
- Official language: Bengali
- Website: Department of Public Health Engineering

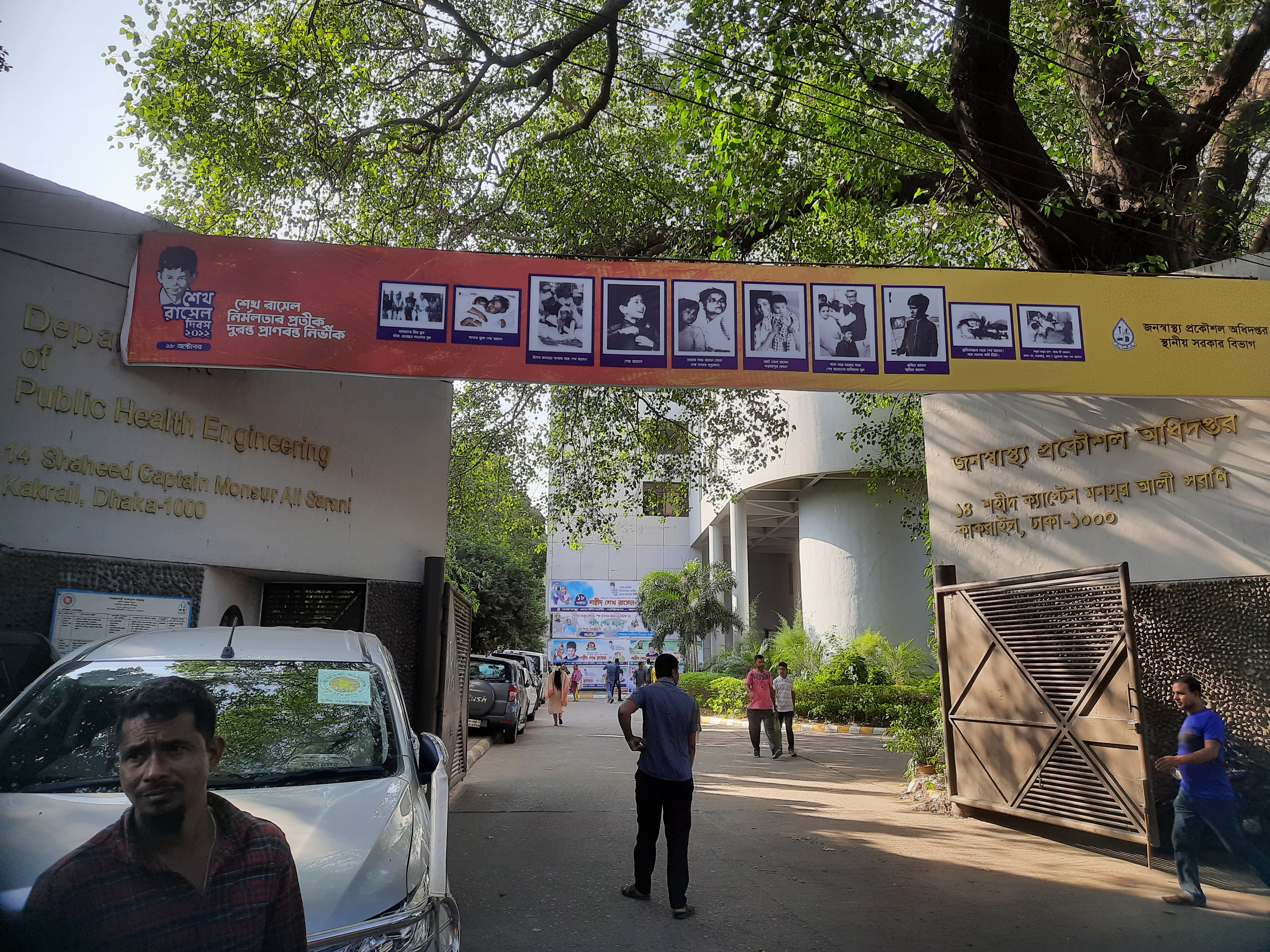
Department of Public Health Engineering, Dhaka

Department of Public Health Engineering is a government agency responsible for providing and maintaining water and sewage lines in Bangladesh and is located in Dhaka. The Department was headed by Chief Engineer and Engineer Md. Abdul Awal is the present Chief Engineer of the Department.

== History ==
The Department of Public Health Engineering was established in 1936 in East Bengal, British Raj. It is responsible for water and sewage lines in Bangladesh excluding the cities of Dhaka, Narayanganj, Chittagong, Khulna and Rajshahi which are managed by Water Supply and Sewerage Authority. Since 1993 the department has been responsible for monitoring arsenic in drinking water. The department is responsible for drilling drinking wells in rural areas of Bangladesh.
