= Rafiqul Islam (Bangladeshi politician) =

Member of Parliament

Rafiqul Islam Bir Uttom
- রফিকুল ইসলাম
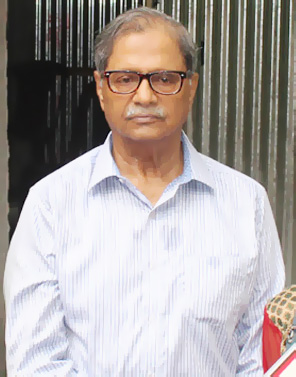
- Islam in 2019

Member of the Bangladesh Parliament for Chandpur-5
- In office 25 January 2009 – 6 August 2024
- Preceded by: M. A. Matin
- In office 14 July 1996 – 13 July 2001
- Preceded by: M. A. Matin

Personal details
- Born: 13 September 1943 (age 82) Chandpur, Bengal Presidency, British India
- Party: Bangladesh Awami League
- Awards: Bir Uttom

Military service
- Allegiance: Bangladesh; Pakistan (before 1971)
- Branch/service: Bangladesh Army; Pakistan Army
- Years of service: 1965-1972
- Rank: Major
- Unit: Corps of Engineers; Regiment of Artillery
- Commands: Commander of Sector – I
- Battles/wars: Bangladesh Liberation War

Rafiqul Islam (born 13 September 1943) is a Bangladesh Awami League politician and a former Jatiya Sangsad member representing the Chandpur-5 constituency.

== Early life and education ==
Rafiqul Islam was born on 13 September 1943, in Naora village, located in Shahrasti municipality of Chandpur district. He passed his SSC from Annada High School in 1959 and his HSC from Victoria College, Comilla. He was admitted in the Dhaka University in economics but later dropped out as he joined the Army in 1963.

== Career ==
=== Pakistan Army ===
Islam joined the Army in 1963. He was commissioned in 1965 in Corps of Engineers. Later he was transferred to Regiment of Artillery. In 1968 he was deputed to East Pakistan Rifles and was appointed the assistant wing commander of 8th Wing of EPR. In 1970 he was transferred to Chittagong EPR sector HQ as its Adjutant.

=== Liberation War of Bangladesh ===
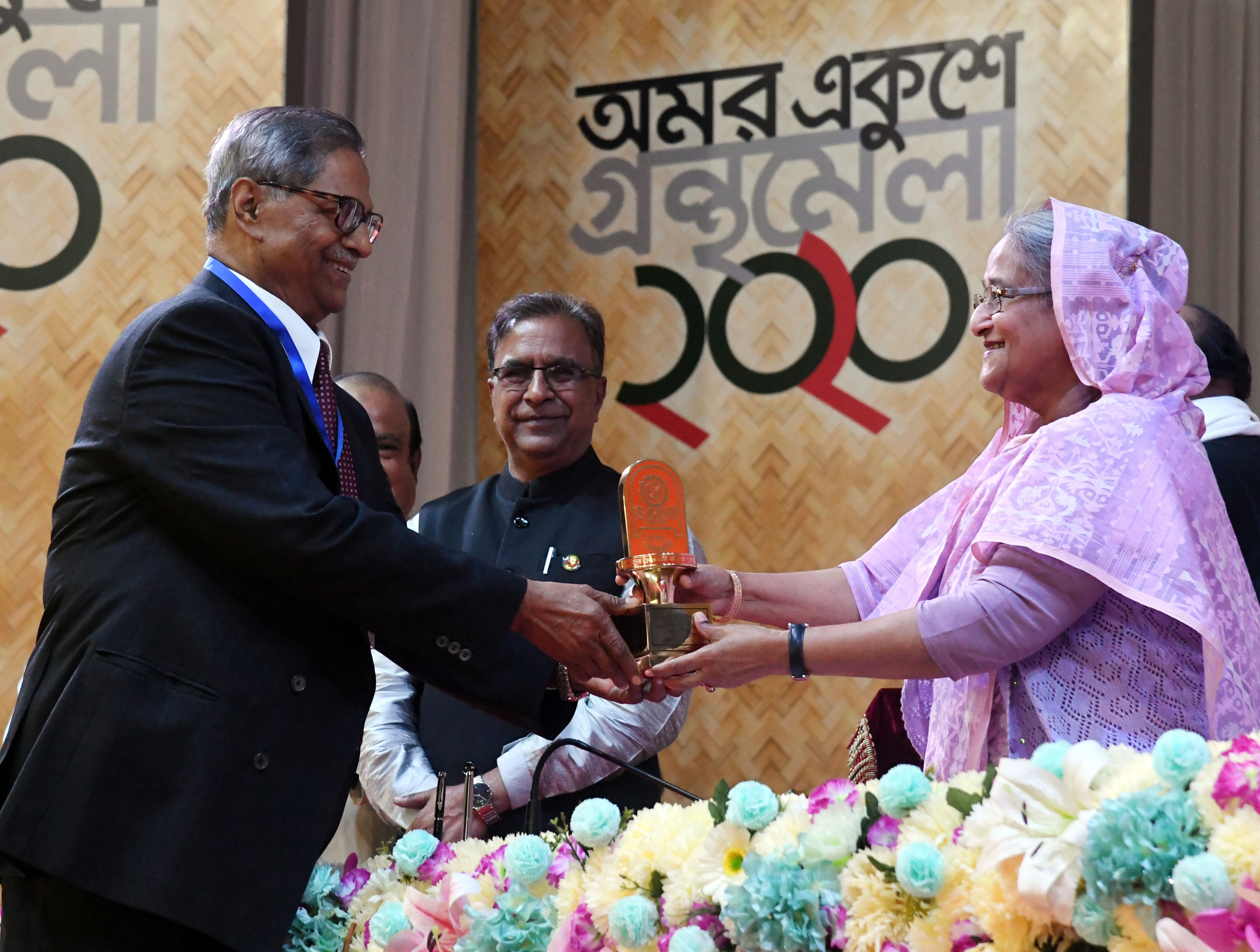
Islam receiving 2019 Bangla Academy Literary Award

He was Sector Commander of Number 1 Sector of Bangladesh Liberation War in 1971. Number 1 sector included all areas east of the Muhuri river in Feni district, Khagrachari district, Rangamati district, Bandarban district, Chittagong district and Cox's Bazar district, extending up to the western border of Myanmar.

=== Government ===
He served for over 14 years as the Chairman of the following government organizations: Dhaka Water and Sewerage Authority, Bangladesh Handloom Board, and Bangladesh Inland Water Transport Corporation. Afterwards, he was nominated and included in the 1st Caretaker Government of Bangladesh as Advisor during 1990–1991, and was given the responsibility of the Ministry of Shipping and the Ministry of Civil Aviation and Tourism.

=== Politician ===
He joined the Bangladesh Awami League and ran for political office. He was elected a member of Bangladesh Parliament in July, 1996 from 264-Chandpur-5 (Hajigonj-Shahrasti Upazillas).

He was re-elected to the parliament in 2008, 2014 and 2018 from Chandpur-5 constituency as a Bangladesh Awami League candidate.
