= Rural Development and Co-operatives Division =

Bangladesh agricultural government division

- পল্লী উন্নয়ন ও সমবায় বিভাগ
- Government Seal of Bangladesh

Department overview
- Formed: 1972; 54 years ago
- Jurisdiction: Government of Bangladesh
- Headquarters: Bangladesh Secretariat, Agargaon, Dhaka
- Department executive: Md. Mashiur Rahman, ndc, Secretary
- Parent department: Ministry of Local Government, Rural Development and Co-operatives
- Website: Rural Development and Co-operatives Division

Rural Development and Co-operatives Division (Bengali: পল্লী উন্নয়ন ও সমবায় বিভাগ) is a Bangladesh government division responsible for rural development and regulation of agricultural cooperative organisations. Mohamad Rezaul Ahasan is the Secretary in charge of the Rural Development and Co-operatives Division. State Minister Swapan Bhattacharjee is in charge of the Ministry.

== History ==
Rural Development and Co-operatives Division developed the One House One Farm Project (Ektee Bari Ektee Khamar Project) in 2009 to increase rural employment and development. The budget for the project was 11 billion taka with an aim to target 578 thousand farms and 2.9 million people.

In 2014, the Executive Committee of the National Economic Council approved the development of concentrated rural housing township called Palli Janapad. The government allocated 8.29 billion taka for the project. The project would be overseen by the Rural Development and Co-operatives Division and implemented by the Center for Irrigation and Water Management and Rural Development Academy.

On 27 June 2019, State Minister Swapan Bhattacharjee announced in parliament that the Rural Development and Co-operatives Division would provided low cost loans at 4 percent interest to rural farmers who were growing non-major food grains.
