= Ministry of Food (Bangladesh) =

Government ministry of Bangladesh

- খাদ্য মন্ত্রণালয়
- Government Seal of Bangladesh

Ministry overview
- Formed: 2012; 14 years ago
- Jurisdiction: Government of Bangladesh
- Annual budget: ৳32414 crore (US$2.6 billion) (2024-2025)
- Minister responsible: Afroza Khanam Rita
- Minister of State responsible: Md Abdul Bari
- Ministry executives: Md. Ismail Hossain, Secretary
- Child Ministry: Directorate General of Food
- Website: www.mofood.gov.bd

The Ministry of Food (Bengali: খাদ্য মন্ত্রণালয়; Khādya mantraṇālaẏa) is the government ministry of Bangladesh responsible for National Food Policy.

== History ==
The Ministry of Food was originally the Ministry of Food & Civil Supplies in 1971 after the Independence of Bangladesh. It was renamed to Ministry of Food & Relief and then renamed again as the Ministry of Food & Disaster Management. In 2012, the government of Bangladesh reorganized it as the Ministry of Food and another separate ministry was created called the Ministry of Disaster Management.

== Departments ==
- Directorate General of Food
