= Ministry of Civil Aviation and Tourism =

Government ministry of Bangladesh

- বেসামরিক বিমান পরিবহন ও পর্যটন মন্ত্রণালয়
- Government Seal of Bangladesh

Ministry overview
- Formed: 15 August 1975; 51 years ago
- Jurisdiction: Government of Bangladesh
- Headquarters: Bangladesh Secretariat, Dhaka
- Annual budget: ৳1884 crore (US$150 million) (2026-2027)
- Minister responsible: M. Rashiduzzaman Millat, Minister of Civil Aviation and Tourism
- Ministry executive: Fahmida Akhtar, Secretary
- Child agencies: Biman Bangladesh Airlines; Civil Aviation Authority, Bangladesh; Bangladesh Parjatan Corporation; Bangladesh Tourism Board
- Website: www.mocat.gov.bd

The Ministry of Civil Aviation and Tourism (Bengali: বেসামরিক বিমান পরিবহন ও পর্যটন মন্ত্রণালয়, romanized: Besamôrik Biman Pôribôhôn o Pôryôṭôn Môntrôṇalôẏ) is a ministry of Government of Bangladesh responsible for the formulation of national policies and programmes for development and regulation of civil aviation and the regulation of the Bangladeshi tourism industry and the promotion of the Bangladesh as a tourist destination.

== Departments ==
- Bangladesh Parjatan Corporation
- Bangladesh Tourism Board
- Biman Bangladesh Airlines
- Civil Aviation Authority, Bangladesh
- Bangladesh Services Limited
- Hotels International Limited

== See also ==
- List of World Heritage Sites in Bangladesh
- List of beaches in Bangladesh
- List of hotels in Bangladesh
