= Cabinet of Bangladesh =

Decision-making body of the Government of Bangladesh

- বাংলাদেশের মন্ত্রিসভা (Bengali); Baṅladeśer Mōntriśobha
- Government Seal of Bangladesh

Agency overview
- Formed: 26 April 1971; 55 years ago
- Type: highest executive body of the Central government
- Jurisdiction: Government of Bangladesh
- Headquarters: Bangladesh Secretariat, Dhaka
- Prime Minister responsible: Tarique Rahman
- Agency executive: Nasimul Gani, Cabinet Secretary
- Child agency: Ministries of the government of Bangladesh
- Website: www.cabinet.gov.bd

The Cabinet of Bangladesh (Bengali: বাংলাদেশের মন্ত্রিসভা, romanized: Baṅladeśer Môntrisôbha) is the chief executive body in the People's Republic of Bangladesh. The cabinet is the collective decision-making body of the entire government normally under the Office of the Prime Minister, composed of the Prime Minister and other cabinet ministers. During a caretaker government or interim government, the cabinet is instead composed of the Chief Adviser and other cabinet advisers. These "advisorial" positions are equivalent to their respective ministerial positions.

== Responsibility ==
Ministers of the government, according to the Constitution of Bangladesh, are selected primarily from the elected members of House of Nation, also known as Jatiya Sangsad. Cabinet ministers are heads of government departments, mostly with the office of the Minister of Department (or the Minister of Defence). The collective co-ordinating function of the cabinet is reinforced by the statutory position that all the ministers jointly hold the same office, and can exercise the same powers.

The cabinet is the ultimate decision-making body of the executive within the parliamentary system of government in traditional constitutional theory of Bangladesh. This interpretation was originally put across in the work of the Bangladesh constitution in 1972. The political and decision-making authority of the cabinet has been gradually increased over the last few decades, with some claiming its role has been usurped by "prime ministerial" (i.e., more "presidential") government.

The cabinet is the executive committee of the Prime Minister's office, a historic body which has legislative, judicial and executive functions, and whose large membership does include members of the opposition or coalition. Its decisions are generally implemented either under the existing powers of individual government departments, or by the cabinet secretary, the most senior civil servant in Bangladesh.

There shall be a Cabinet for Bangladesh having the Prime Minister at its head and comprising also such other Ministers as the Prime Minister may from time to time designate. The executive power of the Republic shall, in accordance with this Constitution, be exercised by or on the authority of the Prime Minister. The Cabinet shall be collectively responsible to Parliament. All executive actions of the Government shall be expressed to be taken in the name of the President. The President shall by rules specify the manner in which orders and other instruments made in his name shall be attested or authenticated, and the validity of any order or instrument so attested or authenticated shall not be questioned in any court on the ground that it was not duly made or executed. The President shall make rules for the allocation and transaction of the business of the Government.

— Article 55 (1-6): The Cabinet; Part-IV (The Executive), Chapter II: The Prime Minister and the Cabinet, The Constitution of Bangladesh

== Current cabinet and cabinet-rank officials ==
The most influential part of the executive of the Bangladesh government are the ministries. A ministry headed by a minister or state minister (independent charges) shall be responsible for conducting the business of his ministry/division in the parliament unless otherwise directed by the Prime Minister's Office. The secretary is the administrative head of a ministry or division; and is assisted by an additional secretary, joint secretary, deputy secretary, senior assistant secretary and assistant secretary. A few ministries consist of more than one division.

== List of Ministries ==
The cabinet includes the following members:

Role/Portfolio	Name Constituency	Date of Appointment	Date of Termination	Party	Notes	
Prime Minister
Head of government and also in-charge of: Prime Minister's Office; Cabinet Division; Ministry of Defence; Armed Forces Division	Tarique Rahman; MP for Dhaka-17	17 February 2026	Incumbent	Bangladesh Nationalist Party		
Advisers to the Prime Minister
Political Adviser	Mirza Abbas; MP for Dhaka-8	24 February 2026	Incumbent	Bangladesh Nationalist Party	Rank of minister	
Political Adviser and Adviser for Ministry of Agriculture	Nazrul Islam Khan	24 February 2026	Incumbent	Bangladesh Nationalist Party	Rank of minister	
Political Adviser and Adviser for Ministry of Industries	Ruhul Kabir Rizvi	24 February 2026	Incumbent	Bangladesh Nationalist Party	Rank of minister	
Adviser for Ministry of Public Administration	Md. Ismail Zabihullah	24 February 2026	Incumbent	Bangladesh Nationalist Party	Rank of minister	
Adviser for: Ministry of Finance; Ministry of Planning	Rashed Al Mahmud Titumir	24 February 2026	Incumbent	Bangladesh Nationalist Party	Rank of minister	
Adviser for: Ministry of Foreign Affairs; Ministry of Disaster Management and Relief; Ministry of Civil Aviation and Tourism	Humayun Kabir	24 February 2026	Incumbent	Bangladesh Nationalist Party	Rank of minister of state	
Adviser for: Ministry of Defence; Armed Forces Division	AKM Shamsul Islam	24 February 2026	Incumbent	Bangladesh Nationalist Party	Rank of minister of state	
Adviser for: Policy and Strategy; Ministry of Information and Broadcasting; Ministry of Cultural Affairs	Zahed Ur Rahman	24 February 2026	Incumbent	Independent	Rank of minister of state	
Adviser for: Ministry of Education; Ministry of Primary and Mass Education; Ministry of Labour and Employment; Ministry of Expatriates Welfare and Overseas Employment	Mahdi Amin	24 February 2026	Incumbent	Bangladesh Nationalist Party	Rank of minister of state	
Adviser for: Ministry of Posts, Telecommunications and Information Technology; Ministry of Science and Technology	Rehan Asif Asad	24 February 2026	Incumbent	Bangladesh Nationalist Party	Rank of minister of state	
Cabinet Ministers
Ministry of Local Government, Rural Development and Co-operatives	Mirza Fakhrul Islam Alamgir; MP for Thakurgaon-1	17 February 2026	Incumbent	Bangladesh Nationalist Party		
Ministry of Finance; Ministry of Planning	Amir Khasru Mahmud Chowdhury; MP for Chittagong-11	17 February 2026	Incumbent	Bangladesh Nationalist Party		
Ministry of Home Affairs	Salahuddin Ahmed; MP for Cox's Bazar-1	17 February 2026	Incumbent	Bangladesh Nationalist Party		
Ministry of Power, Energy and Mineral Resources	Iqbal Hassan Mahmood; MP for Sirajganj-2	17 February 2026	Incumbent	Bangladesh Nationalist Party		
Ministry of Women and Children Affairs; Ministry of Social Welfare	A. Z. M. Zahid Hossain; MP for Dinajpur-6	17 February 2026	Incumbent	Bangladesh Nationalist Party		
Ministry of Foreign Affairs	Khalilur Rahman	17 February 2026	Incumbent	Independent	Technocrat	
Ministry of Environment, Forest and Climate Change	Abdul Awal Mintoo; MP for Feni-3	17 February 2026	Incumbent	Bangladesh Nationalist Party		
Ministry of Religious Affairs	Kazi Shah Mofazzal Hossain Kaikobad; MP for Comilla-3	17 February 2026	Incumbent	Bangladesh Nationalist Party		
Ministry of Land	Mizanur Rahman Minu; MP for Rajshahi-2	17 February 2026	Incumbent	Bangladesh Nationalist Party		
Ministry of Cultural Affairs	Nitai Roy Chowdhury; MP for Magura-2	17 February 2026	Incumbent	Bangladesh Nationalist Party		
Ministry of Industries; Ministry of Textiles and Jute; Ministry of Commerce	Khandaker Abdul Muktadir; MP for Sylhet-1	17 February 2026	Incumbent	Bangladesh Nationalist Party		
Ministry of Labour and Employment; Ministry of Expatriates Welfare and Overseas Employment	Ariful Haque Choudhury; MP for Sylhet-4	17 February 2026	Incumbent	Bangladesh Nationalist Party		
Ministry of Information and Broadcasting	Zahir Uddin Swapon; MP for Barisal-1	17 February 2026	Incumbent	Bangladesh Nationalist Party		
Ministry of Fisheries and Livestock; Ministry of Agriculture	Amin ur Rashid Yasin	17 February 2026	Incumbent	Bangladesh Nationalist Party	Technocrat	
Ministry of Civil Aviation and Tourism	Afroza Khanam Rita; MP for Manikganj-3	17 February 2026	Incumbent	Bangladesh Nationalist Party		
Ministry of Water Resources	Shahid Uddin Chowdhury Anee; MP for Lakshmipur-3	17 February 2026	Incumbent	Bangladesh Nationalist Party		
Ministry of Disaster Management and Relief	Asadul Habib Dulu; MP for Lalmonirhat-3	17 February 2026	Incumbent	Bangladesh Nationalist Party		
Ministry of Law, Justice and Parliamentary Affairs	Md. Asaduzzaman; MP for Jhenaidah-1	17 February 2026	Incumbent	Bangladesh Nationalist Party		
Ministry of Housing and Public Works	Zakaria Taher Sumon; MP for Comilla-8	17 February 2026	Incumbent	Bangladesh Nationalist Party		
Ministry of Education; Ministry of Primary and Mass Education	A. N. M. Ehsanul Hoque Milan; MP for Chandpur-1	17 February 2026	Incumbent	Bangladesh Nationalist Party		
Ministry of Health and Family Welfare	Sardar Md. Sakhawat Husain; MP for Narsingdi-4	17 February 2026	Incumbent	Bangladesh Nationalist Party		
Minister of Posts, Telecommunications and Information Technology; Ministry of Science and Technology	Fakir Mahbub Anam Swapan; MP for Tangail-1	17 February 2026	Incumbent	Bangladesh Nationalist Party		
Ministry of Road Transport and Bridges; Ministry of Railways; Ministry of Shipping	Shaikh Rabiul Alam; MP for Dhaka-10	17 February 2026	Incumbent	Bangladesh Nationalist Party		
Ministry of Liberation War Affairs	Ahmed Azam Khan; MP for Tangail-8	12 March 2026	Incumbent	Bangladesh Nationalist Party		
Ministers of State
Ministry of Civil Aviation and Tourism	M. Rashiduzzaman Millat; MP for Jamalpur-1	17 February 2026	Incumbent	Bangladesh Nationalist Party		
Ministry of Power, Energy and Mineral Resources	Anindya Islam Amit; MP for Jessore-3	17 February 2026	Incumbent	Bangladesh Nationalist Party		
Ministry of Textiles and Jute	Md. Shariful Alam; MP for Kishoreganj-6	17 February 2026	Incumbent	Bangladesh Nationalist Party		
Ministry of Foreign Affairs	Shama Obaed; MP for Faridpur-2	17 February 2026	Incumbent	Bangladesh Nationalist Party		
Ministry of Fisheries and Livestock	Sultan Salauddin Tuku; MP for Tangail-5	17 February 2026	Incumbent	Bangladesh Nationalist Party		
Ministry of Water Resources	Farhad Hossain Azad; MP for Panchagarh-2	17 February 2026	Incumbent	Bangladesh Nationalist Party		
Ministry of Youth and Sports	Aminul Haque	17 February 2026	Incumbent	Bangladesh Nationalist Party	Technocrat	
Ministry of Land; Ministry of Chittagong Hill Tracts Affairs	Mir Mohammed Helal Uddin; MP for Chittagong-5	17 February 2026	Incumbent	Bangladesh Nationalist Party		
Ministry of Railways; Road Transport and Highways Division	Habibur Rashid Habib; MP for Dhaka-9	17 February 2026	Incumbent	Bangladesh Nationalist Party		
Ministry of Shipping; Bridges Division	Md. Razib Ahsan; MP for Barisal-4	17 February 2026	Incumbent	Bangladesh Nationalist Party		
Ministry of Public Administration; Ministry of Food	Md Abdul Bari; MP for Joypurhat-2	17 February 2026	Incumbent	Bangladesh Nationalist Party		
Ministry of Local Government, Rural Development and Co-operatives	Mir Shahe Alam; MP for Bogra-2	17 February 2026	Incumbent	Bangladesh Nationalist Party		
Ministry of Planning	Zonayed Saki; MP for Brahmanbaria-6	17 February 2026	Incumbent	Ganosanhati Andolan		
Ministry of Liberation War Affairs	Ishraque Hossain; MP for Dhaka-6	17 February 2026	Incumbent	Bangladesh Nationalist Party		
Ministry of Social Welfare	Farzana Sharmin; MP for Natore-1	17 February 2026	Incumbent	Bangladesh Nationalist Party		
Ministry of Environment, Forest and Climate Change	Shaikh Faridul Islam; MP for Bagerhat-3	17 February 2026	Incumbent	Bangladesh Nationalist Party		
Ministry of Expatriates Welfare and Overseas Employment	Nurul Haque Nur; MP for Patuakhali-3	17 February 2026	Incumbent	Gono Odhikar Parishad		
Ministry of Information and Broadcasting	Yasser Khan Choudhury; MP for Mymensingh-9	17 February 2026	Incumbent	Bangladesh Nationalist Party		
Ministry of Disaster Management and Relief	M. Iqbal Hossain; MP for Mymensingh-3	17 February 2026	Incumbent	Bangladesh Nationalist Party		
Ministry of Health and Family Welfare	M. A. Muhit; MP for Sirajganj-6	17 February 2026	Incumbent	Bangladesh Nationalist Party		
Ministry of Housing and Public Works	Ahammad Sohel Monzoor; MP for Pirojpur-2	17 February 2026	Incumbent	Bangladesh Nationalist Party		
Ministry of Primary and Mass Education	Bobby Hajjaj; MP for Dhaka-13	17 February 2026	Incumbent	Bangladesh Nationalist Party		
Ministry of Cultural Affairs	Ali Newaz Mahmud Khaiyam; MP for Rajbari-1	17 February 2026	Incumbent	Bangladesh Nationalist Party		
Special Assistants to the Prime Minister
Executive Chairman of Bangladesh Investment Development Authority and Bangladesh Economic Zones Authority	Ashik Chowdhury	7 April 2025	Incumbent	Independent politician	Rank of minister of state	
Special Assistant for Investment and Capital Markets	Tanvir Ghani	02 April 2026	Incumbent	Independent politician	Rank of minister of state	
Special Assistant for Hindu, Buddhist, Christian and Ethnic Minority Affairs	Bijon Kanti Sarkar	02 April 2026	Incumbent	Independent politician	Rank of minister of state	
Special Assistant for Overseas Employment in the Asia-Pacific Region	Shakirul Islam Khan	02 April 2026	Incumbent	Independent politician	Rank of secretary	
Special Assistant for Health Affairs	S.M. Ziauddin Haider	22 April 2026	Incumbent	Independent politician	Rank of minister of state	
Special Assistant to the Prime Minister on Youth Employment	Saiyed Bin Abdullah	02 April 2026	Incumbent	Independent politician		Independent politician
Assistant to the Prime Minister on political affairs	Rashed Khan	20 July 2026	Incumbent	Bangladesh Nationalist Party	Rank of secretary	

== List of previous cabinets ==
The following is a list of government cabinets of Bangladesh.

Government Seal of Bangladesh
No.	Cabinet	Formation date	Election	Governing party	Governing system	Ref.
1	Tajuddin/Mujib I	17 April 1971	None	Bangladesh Awami League	Provisional	
2	Mujib II	13 January 1972	1970	Bangladesh Awami League	Provisional	
3	Mujib III	16 March 1973	1973	Bangladesh Awami League	Parliamentary	
4	Mujib IV	25 January 1975	None	Bangladesh Krishak Sramik Awami League	Presidential	
5	Mostaq	15 August 1975	None	Impartial	Interim	
6	Sayem I	10 November 1975	None	Impartial	Interim	
7	Sayem II	26 November 1975	None	Impartial	Interim	
8	Zia I	21 April 1977	1977(Referendum)	Military	Presidential	
9	Zia II	29 June 1978	1978	Jatiyatabadi Front	Presidential	
10	Zia III	15 April 1979	1979	Bangladesh Nationalist Party	Presidential	
11	Sattar	27 November 1981	1981	Bangladesh Nationalist Party	Presidential	
12	Ershad I	27 March 1982	1985(Referendum)	Military	Presidential	
13	Ershad II	11 December 1983	1986; 1988	Jatiya Party	Presidential	
14	Shahabuddin	6 December 1990	None	Impartial	Interim	
15	Khaleda I	20 March 1991	1991	Bangladesh Nationalist Party	Parliamentary	
16	Khaleda II	19 March 1996	Feb 1996	Bangladesh Nationalist Party	Parliamentary	
17	Habib	30 March 1996	None	Impartial	Caretaker	
18	Hasina I	23 June 1996	Jun 1996	Bangladesh Awami League	Parliamentary	
19	Latif	15 July 2001	None	Impartial	Caretaker	
20	Khaleda III	10 October 2001	2001	Bangladesh Nationalist Party	Parliamentary	
21	Iajuddin	29 October 2006	None	Impartial	Caretaker	
22	Fakhruddin	11 January 2007	None	Impartial	Caretaker	
23	Hasina II	6 January 2009	2008	Bangladesh Awami League	Parliamentary	
24	Hasina III	24 January 2014	2014	Bangladesh Awami League	Parliamentary	
25	Hasina IV	7 January 2019	2018	Bangladesh Awami League	Parliamentary	
26	Hasina V	11 January 2024	2024	Bangladesh Awami League	Parliamentary	
27	Yunus	8 August 2024	None	Impartial	Interim	
28	Tarique	17 February 2026	2026	Bangladesh Nationalist Party	Parliamentary	
