= Tarique Rahman ministry =

Government of Bangladesh since 2026

- 25th Council of Ministers of the People's Republic of Bangladesh
- 17 February 2026
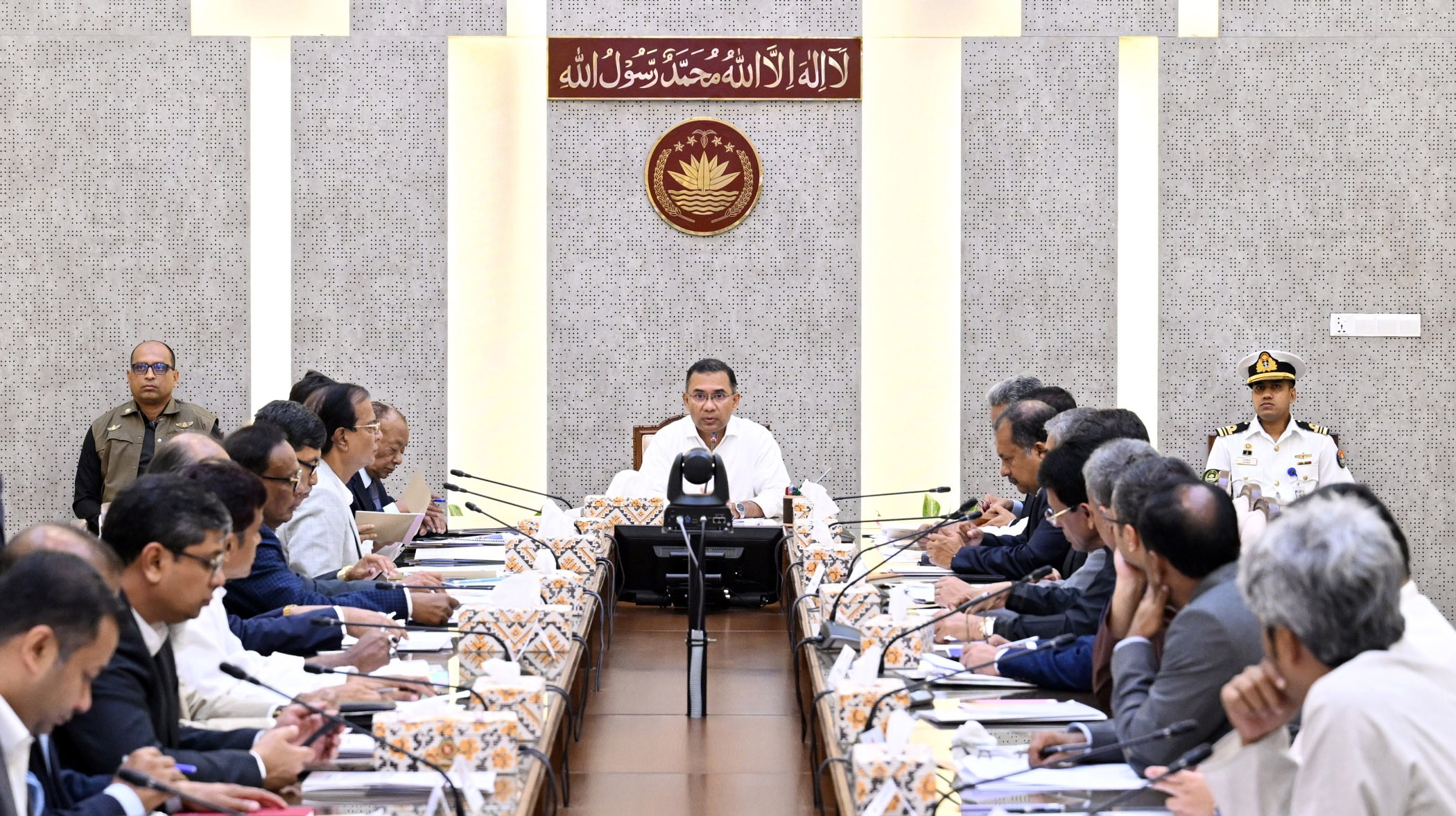
- Rahman presiding over a ministerial meeting, 2026.
- Date formed: 17 February 2026

People and organisations
- President: Mohammed Shahabuddin; Hafiz Uddin Ahmad (Acting); Mirza Fakhrul Islam Alamgir
- Prime Minister: Tarique Rahman
- No. of ministers: 1 Prime minister 10 Advisers; 26 Ministers; 23 Ministers of state 7 Special Assistants to the Prime Minister
- Total no. of members: 67 (including Prime Minister)
- Member party: Bangladesh Nationalist Party; Bangladesh Jatiya Party; Gono Odhikar Parishad; Ganosamhati Andolan; Independent
- Status in legislature: Majority (coalition)
- Opposition party: Bangladesh Jamaat-e-Islami
- Opposition leader: Shafiqur Rahman

History
- Election: 2026
- Legislature terms: 2026–present; (262 days)
- Budget: 2026 Budget
- Predecessor: Yunus ministry

The Tarique Rahman ministry is the 25th cabinet of Bangladesh, led by Prime Minister Tarique Rahman. It was formed on 17 February 2026 following the 2026 general election, held on 12 February 2026, leading to the formation of the 13th Jatiya Sangsad.

== Background ==
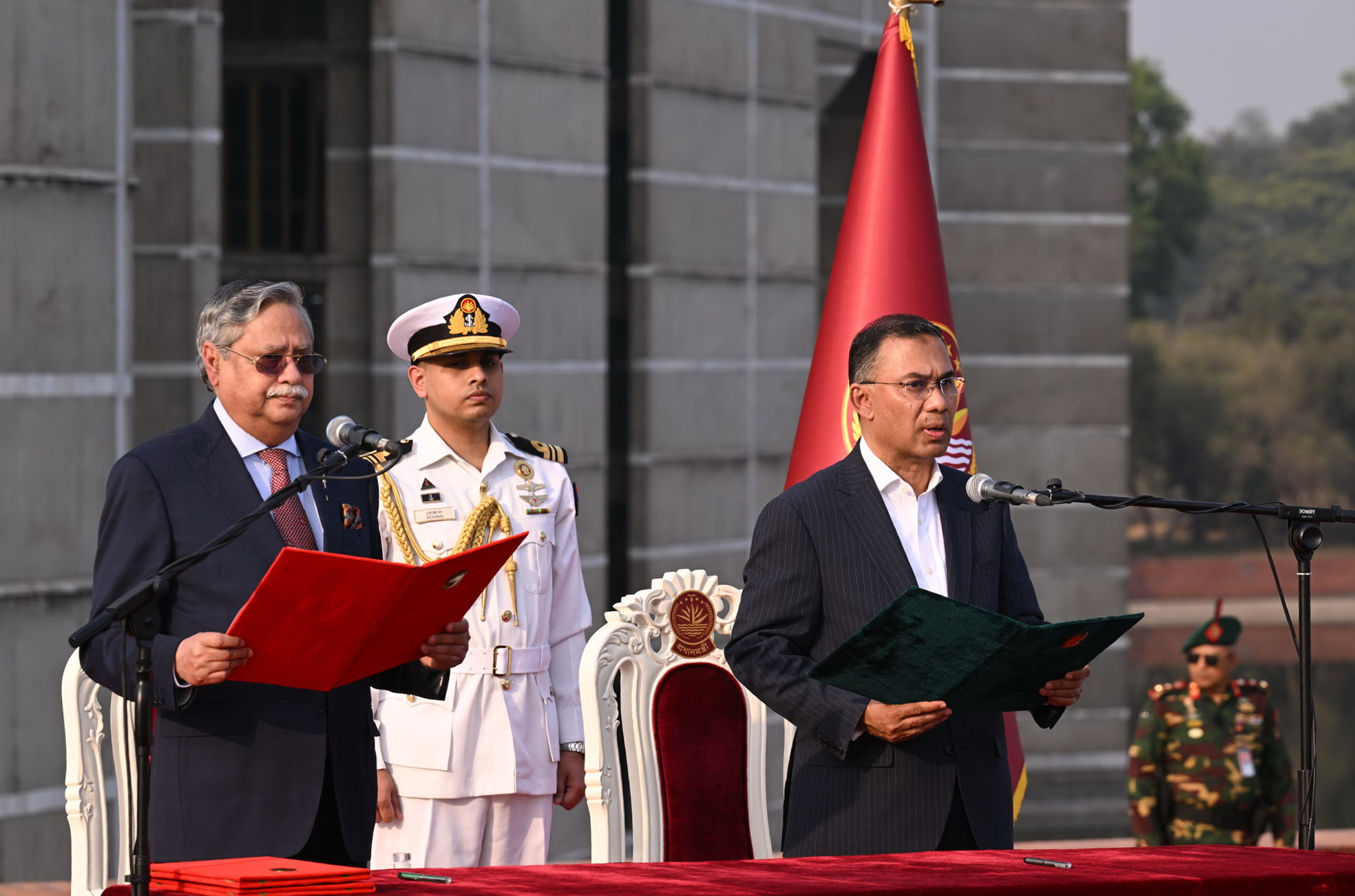
Tarique Rahman taking oath as the Prime Minister on 17 February 2026.

Following Bangladesh Nationalist Party's landslide victory in the 2026 general election, swearing-in ceremony of the cabinet took place on 17 February 2026. President Mohammed Shahabuddin administered the oath, which resulted in the formation of the cabinet.

Hafiz Uddin Ahmad and Kayser Kamal were later made Speaker and Deputy Speaker of the Jatiya Sangsad respectively. In their place, Ahmed Azam Khan was made Minister for Liberation War Affairs and Mir Mohammed Helal Uddin was given additional charge of the land ministry as a State Minister.

== Members ==
The cabinet includes the following members:

Role/Portfolio	Name Constituency	Date of Appointment	Date of Termination	Party	Notes
Head of government
Prime Minister and also in-charge of: Prime Minister's Office; Cabinet Division; Ministry of Defence; Armed Forces Division	Tarique Rahman; MP for Dhaka-17	17 February 2026	Incumbent	Bangladesh Nationalist Party	
Advisers to the Prime Minister
Political Adviser	Mirza Abbas; MP for Dhaka-8	24 February 2026	Incumbent	Bangladesh Nationalist Party	Rank of Minister
Political Adviser and Adviser for Ministry of Agriculture	Nazrul Islam Khan	24 February 2026	Incumbent	Bangladesh Nationalist Party	Rank of Minister
Political Adviser and Adviser for Ministry of Industries	Ruhul Kabir Rizvi	24 February 2026	Incumbent	Bangladesh Nationalist Party	Rank of Minister
Adviser for Ministry of Public Administration	Md. Ismail Zabihullah	24 February 2026	Incumbent	Bangladesh Nationalist Party	Rank of Minister
Adviser for: Ministry of Finance; Ministry of Planning	Rashed Al Mahmud Titumir	24 February 2026	Incumbent	Bangladesh Nationalist Party	Rank of Minister
Political Adviser	Zahir Uddin Swapon; MP for Barisal-1	21 August 2026	Incumbent	Bangladesh Nationalist Party	Rank of Minister
Adviser for: Ministry of Defence; Armed Forces Division	AKM Shamsul Islam	24 February 2026	Incumbent	Bangladesh Nationalist Party	Rank of Minister of state
Adviser for: Policy and Strategy; Ministry of Information and Broadcasting; Ministry of Cultural Affairs	Zahed Ur Rahman	24 February 2026	Incumbent	Independent	Rank of Minister of state
Adviser for: Ministry of Education; Ministry of Primary and Mass Education; Ministry of Labour and Employment; Ministry of Expatriates Welfare and Overseas Employment	Mahdi Amin	24 February 2026	Incumbent	Bangladesh Nationalist Party	Rank of Minister of state
Adviser for: Ministry of Posts, Telecommunications and Information Technology; Ministry of Science and Technology	Rehan Asif Asad	24 February 2026	Incumbent	Bangladesh Nationalist Party	Rank of Minister of state
Ministers
Ministry of Finance; Ministry of Planning	Amir Khasru Mahmud Chowdhury; MP for Chittagong-11	17 February 2026	Incumbent	Bangladesh Nationalist Party	
Ministry of Home Affairs	Salahuddin Ahmed; MP for Cox's Bazar-1	17 February 2026	Incumbent	Bangladesh Nationalist Party	
Ministry of Power, Energy and Mineral Resources	Iqbal Hassan Mahmood; MP for Sirajganj-2	17 February 2026	Incumbent	Bangladesh Nationalist Party	
Ministry of Women and Children Affairs; Ministry of Social Welfare	A. Z. M. Zahid Hossain; MP for Dinajpur-6	17 February 2026	Incumbent	Bangladesh Nationalist Party	
Ministry of Foreign Affairs	Khalilur Rahman	17 February 2026	Incumbent	Independent	Technocrat
Ministry of Environment, Forest and Climate Change	Abdul Awal Mintoo; MP for Feni-3	17 February 2026	Incumbent	Bangladesh Nationalist Party	
Ministry of Religious Affairs	Kazi Shah Mofazzal Hossain Kaikobad; MP for Comilla-3	17 February 2026	Incumbent	Bangladesh Nationalist Party	
Ministry of Land	Mizanur Rahman Minu; MP for Rajshahi-2	17 February 2026	Incumbent	Bangladesh Nationalist Party	
Ministry of Cultural Affairs	Nitai Roy Chowdhury; MP for Magura-2	17 February 2026	Incumbent	Bangladesh Nationalist Party	
Ministry of Industries; Ministry of Textiles and Jute; Ministry of Commerce	Khandaker Abdul Muktadir; MP for Sylhet-1	17 February 2026	Incumbent	Bangladesh Nationalist Party	
Ministry of Labour and Employment; Ministry of Expatriates Welfare and Overseas Employment	Ariful Haque Choudhury; MP for Sylhet-4	17 February 2026	Incumbent	Bangladesh Nationalist Party	
Ministry of Information and Broadcasting	Andaleeve Rahman; MP for Bhola-1	21 August 2026	Incumbent	Bangladesh Jatiya Party	
Ministry of Fisheries and Livestock; Ministry of Agriculture	Amin ur Rashid Yasin	17 February 2026	Incumbent	Bangladesh Nationalist Party	Technocrat
Ministry of Water Resources	Shahid Uddin Chowdhury Anee; MP for Lakshmipur-3	17 February 2026	Incumbent	Bangladesh Nationalist Party	
Ministry of Disaster Management and Relief	Asadul Habib Dulu; MP for Lalmonirhat-3	17 February 2026	Incumbent	Bangladesh Nationalist Party	
Ministry of Law, Justice and Parliamentary Affairs	Md. Asaduzzaman; MP for Jhenaidah-1	17 February 2026	Incumbent	Bangladesh Nationalist Party	
Ministry of Housing and Public Works	Zakaria Taher Sumon; MP for Comilla-8	17 February 2026	Incumbent	Bangladesh Nationalist Party	
Ministry of Education; Ministry of Primary and Mass Education	A. N. M. Ehsanul Hoque Milan; MP for Chandpur-1	17 February 2026	Incumbent	Bangladesh Nationalist Party	
Ministry of Health and Family Welfare	Sardar Md. Sakhawat Husain; MP for Narsingdi-4	17 February 2026	Incumbent	Bangladesh Nationalist Party	
Minister of Posts, Telecommunications and Information Technology; Ministry of Science and Technology	Fakir Mahbub Anam Swapan; MP for Tangail-1	17 February 2026	Incumbent	Bangladesh Nationalist Party	
Ministry of Road Transport and Bridges; Ministry of Railways; Ministry of Shipping	Shaikh Rabiul Alam; MP for Dhaka-10	17 February 2026	Incumbent	Bangladesh Nationalist Party	
Ministry of Liberation War Affairs	Ahmed Azam Khan; MP for Tangail-8	12 March 2026	Incumbent	Bangladesh Nationalist Party	
Ministry of Local Government, Rural Development and Co-operatives	Abdul Moyeen Khan; MP for Narsingdi-2	21 August 2026	Incumbent	Bangladesh Nationalist Party	
Ministry of Chittagong Hill Tracts Affairs	Sa Ching Prue Jerry; MP for Bandarban	21 August 2026	Incumbent	Bangladesh Nationalist Party	
Ministry of Civil Aviation and Tourism	M. Rashiduzzaman Millat; MP for Jamalpur-1	21 August 2026	Incumbent	Bangladesh Nationalist Party	
Ministry of Food	Afroza Khanam Rita; MP for Manikganj-3	21 August 2026	Incumbent	Bangladesh Nationalist Party	
Ministers of State
Ministry of Power, Energy and Mineral Resources	Anindya Islam Amit; MP for Jessore-3	17 February 2026	Incumbent	Bangladesh Nationalist Party	
Ministry of Textiles and Jute	Md. Shariful Alam; MP for Kishoreganj-6	17 February 2026	Incumbent	Bangladesh Nationalist Party	
Ministry of Foreign Affairs	Shama Obaed; MP for Faridpur-2	17 February 2026	Incumbent	Bangladesh Nationalist Party	
Ministry of Foreign Affairs	Humaiun Kobir	21 August 2026	Incumbent	Bangladesh Nationalist Party	Technocrat
Ministry of Fisheries and Livestock	Sultan Salauddin Tuku; MP for Tangail-5	17 February 2026	Incumbent	Bangladesh Nationalist Party	
Ministry of Water Resources	Farhad Hossain Azad; MP for Panchagarh-2	17 February 2026	Incumbent	Bangladesh Nationalist Party	
Ministry of Youth and Sports	Aminul Haque	17 February 2026	Incumbent	Bangladesh Nationalist Party	Technocrat
Ministry of Land; Ministry of Chittagong Hill Tracts Affairs	Mir Mohammed Helal Uddin; MP for Chittagong-5	17 February 2026	Incumbent	Bangladesh Nationalist Party	
Ministry of Railways; Road Transport and Highways Division	Habibur Rashid Habib; MP for Dhaka-9	17 February 2026	Incumbent	Bangladesh Nationalist Party	
Ministry of Shipping; Bridges Division	Md. Razib Ahsan; MP for Barisal-4	17 February 2026	Incumbent	Bangladesh Nationalist Party	
Ministry of Public Administration; Ministry of Food	Md Abdul Bari; MP for Joypurhat-2	17 February 2026	Incumbent	Bangladesh Nationalist Party	
Ministry of Local Government, Rural Development and Co-operatives	Mir Shahe Alam; MP for Bogra-2	17 February 2026	Incumbent	Bangladesh Nationalist Party	
Ministry of Planning	Zonayed Saki; MP for Brahmanbaria-6	17 February 2026	Incumbent	Ganosanhati Andolan	
Ministry of Social Welfare	Farzana Sharmin; MP for Natore-1	17 February 2026	Incumbent	Bangladesh Nationalist Party	
Ministry of Environment, Forest and Climate Change	Shaikh Faridul Islam; MP for Bagerhat-3	17 February 2026	Incumbent	Bangladesh Nationalist Party	
Ministry of Expatriates Welfare and Overseas Employment	Nurul Haque Nur; MP for Patuakhali-3	17 February 2026	Incumbent	Gono Odhikar Parishad	
Ministry of Information and Broadcasting	Yasser Khan Choudhury; MP for Mymensingh-9	17 February 2026	Incumbent	Bangladesh Nationalist Party	
Ministry of Disaster Management and Relief	M. Iqbal Hossain; MP for Mymensingh-3	17 February 2026	Incumbent	Bangladesh Nationalist Party	
Ministry of Health and Family Welfare	M. A. Muhit; MP for Sirajganj-6	17 February 2026	Incumbent	Bangladesh Nationalist Party	
Ministry of Housing and Public Works	Ahammad Sohel Monzoor; MP for Pirojpur-2	17 February 2026	Incumbent	Bangladesh Nationalist Party	
Ministry of Primary and Mass Education	Bobby Hajjaj; MP for Dhaka-13	17 February 2026	Incumbent	Bangladesh Nationalist Party	
Ministry of Cultural Affairs	Ali Newaz Mahmud Khaiyam; MP for Rajbari-1	17 February 2026	Incumbent	Bangladesh Nationalist Party	
Ministry of Religious Affairs	Shamim Kaisar Lincoln; MP for Gaibandha-4	21 August 2026	Incumbent	Bangladesh Nationalist Party	
Special Assistants to the Prime Minister			Incumbent		
Executive Chairman of Invest Bangladesh Authority	Ashik Chowdhury	7 April 2025	Incumbent	Independent politician	Rank of Minister of State
Special Assistant for Investment and Capital Markets	Tanvir Ghani	02 April 2026	Incumbent	Independent politician	Rank of Minister of State
Special Assistant for Hindu, Buddhist, Christian and Ethnic Minority Affairs	Bijon Kanti Sarkar	02 April 2026	Incumbent	Independent politician	Rank of Minister of State
Special Assistant for Overseas Employment in the Asia-Pacific Region	Shakirul Islam Khan	02 April 2026	Incumbent	Independent politician	Rank of Secretary
Special Assistant for Health Affairs	S. M. Ziauddin Hyder	22 April 2026	Incumbent	Independent politician	Rank of Minister of State
Special Assistant to the Prime Minister on Youth Employment	Saiyed Bin Abdullah	02 April 2026	Incumbent	Independent politician	Rank of Additional Secretary
Political Assistant to the Prime Minister	Rashed Khan	20 July 2026	Incumbent	Bangladesh Nationalist Party	Rank of Secretary

== Former members ==
=== Members who resigned ===
Name Constituency	Position	Portfolio	Date of Appointment	Date of Termination	Party	Reason
Hafiz Uddin Ahmad; MP for Bhola-3	Minister	Ministry of Liberation War Affairs	17 February 2026	12 March 2026	Bangladesh Nationalist Party	Elected as Speaker of the Jatiya Sangsad
Kayser Kamal; MP for Netrokona-1	Minister of State	Ministry of Land	17 February 2026	12 March 2026	Bangladesh Nationalist Party	Elected as Deputy Speaker of the Jatiya Sangsad
Dipen Dewan; MP for Rangamati	Minister	Ministry of Chittagong Hill Tracts Affairs	17 February 2026	1 June 2026	Bangladesh Nationalist Party	Due to physical illness and various complications
Mirza Fakhrul Islam Alamgir; MP for Thakurgaon-1	Minister	Ministry of Local Government, Rural Development and Co-operatives	17 February 2026	21 August 2026	Bangladesh Nationalist Party	Elected as President of Bangladesh
Ishraque Hossain; MP for Dhaka-6	Minister of State	Ministry of Liberation War Affairs	17 February 2026	19 October 2026	Bangladesh Nationalist Party	Due to firearm controversy

== Reactions ==
Malaysian prime minister Anwar Ibrahim, Indian prime minister Narendra Modi, Pakistani president Asif Ali Zardari and prime minister Shehbaz Sharif, Sri Lankan president Anura Kumara Dissanayake, Nepalese prime minister Sushila Karki, Maldivian president Mohamed Muizzu, and Bhutanese prime minister Tshering Tobgay congratulated Rahman on his victory. Modi also spoke with Rahman through telephone. West Bengal Chief Minister & Trinamool Congress Chairperson Mamata Banerjee along with Indian National Congress President Mallikarjun Kharge also congratulated Rahman. US President Donald Trump congratulated Rahman following the inauguration. In a personal letter sent to Rahman, he wished success for Rahman's premiership and urged to implement the trade agreement and complete the defence deals.

== See also ==
- Shadow cabinet of Bangladesh
