= Ganatantra Manch =

Bangladeshi political alliance

Ganatantra Manch গণতন্ত্র মঞ্চ
- Abbreviation: GM
- Leader: A. S. M. Abdur Rab; Mahmudur Rahman Manna; Zonayed Saki; Khandaker Ali Abbas
- Founded: 8 August 2022; 4 years ago
- Dissolved: 2025
- Ideology: Socialism; Factions: Communism; Marxism–Leninism; Liberal democracy Progressivism
- Political position: Left-wing
- Member parties: Jatiya Samajtantrik Dal (Rab); Nagorik Oikko; Revolutionary Workers Party of Bangladesh; Ganosanhati Andolan

Ganatantra Manch (Bengali: গণতন্ত্র মঞ্চ, lit. 'Democracy Stage') was a political alliance consisting of six political parties in Bangladesh. The alliance announced its formation on 8 August 2022 and consisted of the Jatiya Samajtantrik Dal (Rab), the Nagrik Oikya, the Revolutionary Workers Party of Bangladesh, the Bhasani Anusari Parishad, the Rastro Songskar Andolon and the Ganosanhati Andolan. The Gono Odhikar Parishad was initially with the alliance, but in May 2023 they pulled out of the alliance. Among them, only the JSD (Rab) and the Revolutionary Workers Party were registered with the Bangladesh Election Commission. The coalition effectively ceased to function after Rashtra Sanskar Andolon and several allied parties withdrew and began pursuing a new alliance with National Citizen Party.
