= Overseas Employment Services =

Overseas Employment Services may refer to:

- Philippine Overseas Employment Administration
- Bangladesh Overseas Employment and Services Limited
- Overseas Employment Services (Pakistan)
