= Shariful Islam Jinnah =

Bangladeshi Politician

Member of Parliament for Bogra-2
- In office 29 January 2014 – 6 August 2024
- Preceded by: A. K. M. Hafizur Rahman
- Succeeded by: Mir Shahe Alam

Personal details
- Born: 13 March 1950 (age 75)
- Party: Jatiya Party

Shariful Islam Jinnah (born 13 March 1950) is a Bangladeshi politician and a former Jatiya Sangsad member representing the Bogra-2 constituency in 2014.

== Early life ==
Jinnah was born on 13 June 1950. He has a bachelor's in commerce degree.

== Career ==
Jinnah was elected to parliament from Bogra-2 as a Jatiya Party candidate in 2014. He was re-elected on 30 December 2018.

In February 2021, the Anti-Corruption Commission sued Jinnah for amassing wealth illegally and concealing wealth information.
