= Wage Earners' Welfare Board =

Bangladeshi welfare board

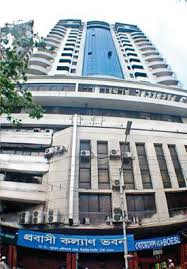
- Headquarters of the board in Dhaka
- Abbreviation: WEWB
- Formation: 1990
- Legal status: Government agency
- Purpose: Welfare spending
- Headquarters: Dhaka
- Region served: Bangladesh
- Official language: Bengali
- Parent organisation: Ministry of Expatriates Welfare and Overseas Employment
- Budget: ৳500 million
- Website: www.wewb.gov.bd

Wage Earners' Welfare Board (Bengali: ওয়েজ আর্নার্স কল্যাণ বোর্ড) is a Bangladeshi government welfare board that is responsible for the welfare of expatriat Bangladeshi workers. The department headquarter is located in Dhaka, Bangladesh.

== History ==
The Wage Earners' Welfare Board was established in 1990 to manage the Wages Earners’ Welfare Fund which was started together. It is managed by an intergovernmental official run board. The board was made into a statutory organisation through the Wage Earners’ Welfare Board law-2016. The board was further strengthened through The Expatriate Welfare Board Act, 2017. It is under the Ministry of Expatriates' Welfare and Overseas Employment of the government of Bangladesh. It works as a subsidiary of Bureau of Manpower Employment and Training.
