= Abul Hasnat Chowdhury =

Bangladeshi politician

Md. Abul Hasnat Chowdhury

Member of Bangladesh Parliament
- In office 1979–1986
- Preceded by: Kasim Uddin Ahmed
- Succeeded by: Mozaffar Hossain

Personal details
- Political party: Bangladesh Nationalist Party

Md. Abul Hasnat Chowdhury is a Bangladesh Nationalist Party politician and a former member of parliament for Bogra-2.

== Career ==
Chowdhury was elected to parliament from Bogra-2 as a Bangladesh Nationalist Party candidate in 1979.
