= Rezaul Bari Dina =

Bangladeshi politician

Member of Bangladesh Parliament
- In office 15 February 1996 – 12 June 1996
- Preceded by: Shahaduzzaman
- Succeeded by: A. K. M. Hafizur Rahman
- In office 2001–2006
- Preceded by: A. K. M. Hafizur Rahman
- Succeeded by: A. K. M. Hafizur Rahman

Personal details
- Born: 29 July 1951 Bogra, Bangladesh
- Died: 18 June 2014 (aged 62) Dhaka, Bangladesh
- Party: Bangladesh Nationalist Party

Rezaul Bari Dina (29 July 1951 – 18 June 2014) was a Bangladesh Nationalist Party politician and former member of parliament for Bogra-2.

== Career ==
Dina was elected to parliament from Bogra-2 as a Bangladesh Nationalist Party candidate in 2001. He served as the whip.

== Death ==
Dina died on 18 June 2014 in City Hospital, Dhanmondi, Dhaka, Bangladesh.
