= Syed Maskarul Alam Chowdhury =

Bangladeshi politician

Member of Bangladesh Parliament
- In office 1988–1990

Syed Maskarul Alam Chowdhury (Bengali: সৈয়দ মাসকুরুল আলম চৌধুরী) is a Bangladeshi politician and a former member of the Bangladesh Parliament for Bogra-2.

== Career ==
Chowdhury was elected to parliament from Bogra-2 as a combined opposition candidate in 1988.
