= Bogra-2 =

Bangladeshi parliamentary constituency

Coordinates: 25.00°N 89.32°E

- Constituency for the Jatiya Sangsad
- District: Bogra District
- Division: Rajshahi Division

Current constituency
- Created: 1973
- Party: Bangladesh Nationalist Party
- Member: Mir Shahe Alam
- ← 36 Bogra-1 38 Bogra-3 →

Bogra-2 is a constituency represented in the Jatiya Sangsad (National Parliament) of Bangladesh since 2026 by Mir Shahe Alam of the Bangladesh Nationalist Party.

== Boundaries ==
The constituency encompasses Shibganj Upazila and Mokamtola Upazila.

== History ==
The constituency was created for the first general elections in newly independent Bangladesh, held in 1973.

== Members of Parliament ==
Election	Member	Party
1973	Kasim Uddin Ahmed	Awami League
1979	Md. Abul Hasnat Chowdhury	Bangladesh Nationalist Party
Major Boundary Changes
1986	Mozaffar Hossain	Independent
1988	Syed Maskarul Alam Chowdhury	Independent
1991	Maulana Shahaduzzaman	Bangladesh Jamaat-e-Islami
Feb 1996	Rezaul Bari Dina	Bangladesh Nationalist Party
Jun 1996	A. K. M. Hafizur Rahman	Bangladesh Nationalist Party
2001	Rezaul Bari Dina	Bangladesh Nationalist Party
2008	A. K. M. Hafizur Rahman	Bangladesh Nationalist Party
2014	Shariful Islam Jinnah	Jatiya Party (Ershad)
2018	Shariful Islam Jinnah	Jatiya Party (Ershad)
2024	Shariful Islam Jinnah	Jatiya Party (Ershad)
2026	Mir Shahe Alam	Bangladesh Nationalist Party

== Elections ==
=== Elections in the 2020s ===
General election 2026: Bogra-2
Party	Candidate	Votes	%	±%
BNP	Mir Shah Alam			
Jamaat	Abul Azad Mohammad Shahaduzzaman			
IAB	Md. Jamal Uddin			
Nagorik Oikko	Mahmudur Rahman Manna			
JP(E)	Shariful Islam Jinnah			
GOP	Md. Salem Sarkar			
Independent	Md. Rezaul Karim Talu			
Majority				
Turnout				

=== Elections in the 2010s ===
Shariful Islam Jinnah was elected unopposed in the 2014 general election after opposition parties withdrew their candidacies in a boycott of the election.

=== Elections in the 2000s ===
General Election 2008: Bogra-2
Party	Candidate	Votes	%	±%
BNP	A. K. M Hafijur Rahman	134,359	59.9	−3.9
JP(E)	Shariful Islam Jinnah	88,977	39.7	N/A
BDB	Md. Anisar Rahman	970	0.4	N/A
Majority		45,382	20.2	−17.5
Turnout		224,306	92.1	+7.2
BNP hold				

General Election 2001: Bogra-2
Party	Candidate	Votes	%	±%
BNP	Rezaul Bari Dina	116,806	63.8	+12.2
AL	Mahmudur Rahman Manna	47,819	26.1	+12.3
IJOF	Shariful Islam Jinnah	17,716	9.7	N/A
JSD	Md. Abdul Karim Mandal	436	0.2	N/A
Independent	Mozaffar Hossain	390	0.2	N/A
Majority		68,987	37.7	+3.2
Turnout		183,167	84.9	+4.3
BNP hold				

=== Elections in the 1990s ===
General Election June 1996: Bogra-2
Party	Candidate	Votes	%	±%
BNP	A. K. M. Hafizur Rahman	74,345	51.6	+27.4
Jamaat	Shahaduzzaman	24,593	17.1	−16.9
JP(E)	Shariful Islam Jinnah	21,518	14.9	+8.7
AL	Mahmudur Rahman Manna	19,871	13.8	+2.8
Gano Forum	Masudur Rahman Helal	3,795	2.6	N/A
Majority		49,752	34.5	+24.7
Turnout		144,122	80.6	+22.0
BNP gain from Jamaat				

General Election 1991: Bogra-2
Party	Candidate	Votes	%	±%
Jamaat	Shahaduzzaman	33,969	34.0	
BNP	Md. Motiar Rahman Prang	24,213	24.2	
Independent	Md. Abul Kasem Fakir	13,967	14.0	
AL	Md. Rafiqul Islam Fakir	10,958	11.0	
JP(E)	Mozaffar Hossain	6,164	6.2	
FP	Syed Maskarul Alam Chowdhury	3,735	3.7	
JSD	Altab Hossain	2,346	2.3	
Jatia Mukti Dal	Mahmudur Rahman Manna	2,180	2.2	
Independent	Shahidullah	1,266	1.3	
Zaker Party	Abdul Samad	914	0.9	
Independent	Md. Habibur Rahman Prang	297	0.3	
Majority		9,756	9.8	
Turnout		100,009	58.6	
Jamaat gain from				
