= Revolutionary Workers Party of Bangladesh =

Revolutionary Workers Party of Bangladesh বাংলাদেশের বিপ্লবী ওয়ার্কার্স পার্টি
- Abbreviation: BRWP
- President: Khandaker Ali Abbas
- Secretary-General: Saiful Haque
- Founded: 14 June 2004
- Split from: Workers Party of Bangladesh
- Headquarters: 27/8/A Topkhana Road, Dhaka-1000
- Newspaper: People's Democracy
- Ideology: Communism; Marxism–Leninism
- Political position: Far-left
- National affiliation: Ganatantra Manch
- Bangladesh Parliament: Parliament dissolved

Election symbol
- Spade

Party flag

Website
- rwpbd.org

The Revolutionary Workers Party of Bangladesh (BRWP; Bengali: বাংলাদেশের বিপ্লবী ওয়ার্কার্স পার্টি) is a Marxist-Leninist political party in Bangladesh, founded on 14 June 2004 after splitting from the Workers Party of Bangladesh due to disagreements regarding joint actions with the Awami League. The party initially used the name "Workers Party of Bangladesh" briefly after its founding. The party's president is Khandaker Ali Abbas and the general secretary is Saiful Haque.

Mass organisations within the party include the Bangladesh Agricultural Labour Union (BALU), Viplavi Krishak Sanhati (Revolutionary Peasants Union) and Shramjibi Nari Moitreyi (Working Women's Unity). The party publishes the newspaper, People's Democracy.

The party took part in what was considered the world's first Generation Z revolution in July 2024, which successfully deposed Sheikh Hasina from power.

== Election results ==
=== Jatiya Sangsad elections ===
Election	Party leader	Votes	%	Seats	+/–	Position	Government
2008	Khandaker Ali Abbas	2,021	0.00%	0 / 300	New	▲34th	Extra-parliamentary
2014	Saiful Huq	Boycotted		0 / 300	0	—N/a	Extra-parliamentary
2018	Saiful Huq	18,043	0.02%	0 / 300	0	▼18th	Extra-parliamentary
2024	Saiful Huq	Boycotted		0 / 300	0	—N/a	Extra-parliamentary
