= Probashi Kallyan Bank =

Bank of Bangladesh

- Company type: Government
- Industry: Banking
- Founded: 2010; 16 years ago in Dhaka, Bangladesh
- Headquarters: Dhaka, Bangladesh
- Key people: Mr. Md Ruhul Amin (Chairman) Mr. Chanu Gopal Ghosh (MD)
- Products: Consumer Banking; Corporate Banking; Investment Banking
- Website: pkb.gov.bd

Probashi Kallyan Bank is a state-owned bank in Bangladesh, a specialized financial institution for non-resident Bangladeshis.

== History ==
The Bank was started in 2010 by the Government of Bangladesh to provide financial services to oversea Bangladeshis. It had a start up capital of 1 billion taka. 95 percent of the capital came from Wage Earners' Welfare Fund and five percent from the government of Bangladesh.

On 11 September 2016, Md Wahiduzzaman Khandaker was appointed Managing Director of Probashi Kallyan Bank.

The bank has faced allegations of corruption and nepotism. It faced staff shortages in 2020, harming daily operations of the bank.

Expatriates' Welfare Minister Imran Ahmad in March 2021 announced plans to establish branches of the bank in every Upazlia in Bangladesh. In August 2021, Probashi Kallyan Bank signed an agreement with NCC Bank to cooperate in remittance disbursement.

Probashi Kallyan Bank established a currency exchange booth at the Hazrat Shahjalal International Airport in June 2022. In September 2022, Md Mazibur Rahman was appointed Managing Director of Probashi Kallyan Bank. The previous Managing Director of the Bank, Md Zahidul Haque, was appointed Managing Director of Rajshahi Krishi Unnayan Bank.
