= Kasim Uddin Ahmed =

Bangladeshi politician

Member of Bangladesh Parliament
- In office 1973–1979
- Succeeded by: Md. Abul Hasnat Chowdhury

Personal details
- Political party: Bangladesh Awami League

Kasim Uddin Ahmed is a Bangladesh Awami League politician and a former member of parliament for Bogra-2.

== Career ==
Ahmed was the general secretary of Inland Water Transport Workers Union in 1956. He was elected to parliament from Bogra-2 as a Bangladesh Awami League candidate in 1973.
