= Mir Shahe Alam =

Bangladeshi politician

- মীর শাহে আলম
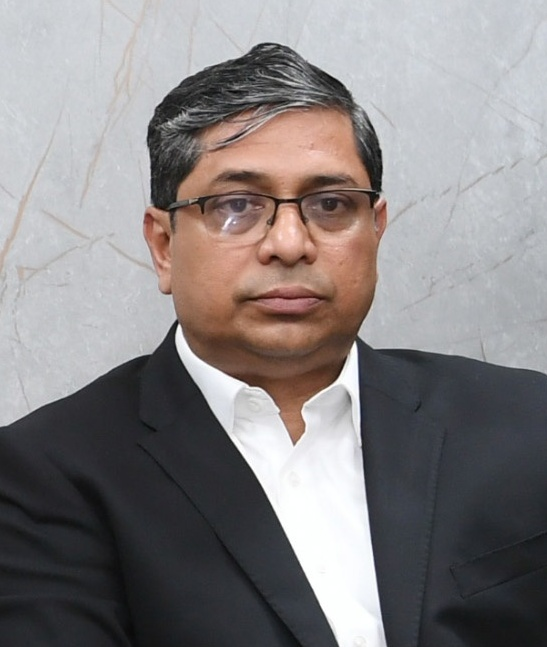

Minister of State for Local Government, Rural Development and Co-operatives
- Incumbent
- Assumed office 17 February 2026
- Prime Minister: Tarique Rahman
- Preceded by: Swapan Bhattacharjee

Member of Parliament
- Incumbent
- Assumed office 17 February 2026
- Preceded by: Shariful Islam Jinnah
- Constituency: Bogura-2

Personal details
- Born: August 7, 1970 (age 56) Bogra District, East Pakistan
- Party: Bangladesh Nationalist Party
- Spouse: Mir Laboni Akter
- Children: 2 sons, 1 daughter
- Education: Shibganj M.H. College
- Occupation: Politician, businessman
- Website: www.mirshahealam.com

Mir Shahe Alam is a Bangladeshi politician and a prominent leader of the Bangladesh Nationalist Party (BNP). He is the elected Member of Parliament for the Bogura-2 (Shibganj) constituency. On 17 February 2026, he was appointed as the State Minister for Local Government, Rural Development and Co-operatives in the Tarique Rahman ministry, serving under Cabinet Minister Mirza Fakhrul Islam Alamgir. His appointment made him the first cabinet representative from Bogura in more than three decades.

== Political career ==
=== Public Representation ===
In 1997, at the age of 23, he was elected as the Chairman of Atmul Union Parishad, becoming the youngest UP Chairman in the country at the time.

=== 13th General Election (2026) ===
In the 2026 election for Bogura-2, the BNP initially nominated Mahmudur Rahman Manna, the president of Nagorik Oikya, as the coalition candidate. Following the cancellation of Manna's nomination, the party nominated Mir Shahe Alam. He won the seat with 145,024 votes and was subsequently appointed as a State Minister.

=== Ministerial Tenure ===
As State Minister, Alam has focused on stabilizing rural infrastructure and essential supplies. During a fuel crisis scare, he assured the public that fuel oil supply remained normal and urged against panic. He has also been active in promoting cultural and educational initiatives within the local government framework.

== Corruption and Abuse of Power ==
Since 2008, several political cases were filed against him. In 2023, he was arrested and imprisoned in a case involving alleged sabotage. After spending a significant amount of time in custody, he was released on bail by the High Court in early 2024.

In June 2026, Alam became the subject of controversy after opposition lawmakers alleged that three newly created unions in Alam's constituency Mirbari, Digonto, and Simanto had been named after his family title and his two sons. Alam in response denied the allegation, claiming that the names had "miraculously" coincided with those of his sons. This drew criticism from lawmakers within the ruling BNP, who said it had embarrassed the party and raised concerns about favoritism and the government's public image.

Alam has faced allegations of favoritism, conflict of interest, and abuse of office. A Netra News report from June 2026 claimed that his constituency, Shibganj, received Tk 74 crore in road, footpath, and bridge projects, with a major share reportedly going to his son Mir Shimanto Alam’s contracting firm, including Tk 13.5 crore in projects. In July, Channel One separately reported that the minister and his family obtained nearly Tk 40 crore in government contracts after he became a minister, including contracts under multiple ministries and his own ministry. The report also raised questions about potential conflicts of interest and alleged that some projects had the minister’s firm as the sole bidder.

In June 2026 it was reported that Alam, despite not being the minister responsible for the Home Ministry, sent a demi-official (DO) letter to the Home Ministry concerning Muhammad Sharif, Officer-in-Charge of Sadarghat Police Station in Chattogram. The letter called for an investigation into allegations against Sharif, including political bias, extortion, corruption, illegal financial transactions, and abuse of power. Sharif denied the allegations. Following the Home Ministry’s directive, Sharif was withdrawn from his post and a committee was formed to investigate the allegations.

In August 2026, Channel One reported that Executive Engineer Md. Tabibur Rahman Talukdar of the Department of Public Health Engineering, who had been temporarily suspended over allegations of corruption, was cleared of the allegations and reinstated within just 12 days following a recommendation from Alam. He was later assigned as the project director of two projects worth nearly Tk 4,000 crore, raising questions about Alam’s influence over the administration and abuse of power. A journalist was also arrested under the Cyber Security Act and an extortion case after reporting allegedly defamatory information about the minister, but was later granted bail following a settlement.

In September 2026, The Daily Star revealed that Alam's family-owned businesses had secured at least 12 government contracts worth over Tk 71 crore between 2024 and 2026. The report raised conflict-of-interest concerns over contracts awarded after Alam became state minister for industries and his previous role as a director of Bangladesh Small and Cottage Industries Corporation operating under the same ministry. According to Samakal, Alam's son Simanto used his father's government position to seek tax and customs exemptions for Alam's family-owned Rupsi Rice and Nutrition Mills, submitting a request to the National Board of Revenue that included Alam's official visiting card. The report quoted Transparency International Bangladesh describing the use of public office for private business interests as an ethical violation and conflict of interest.

On November 10, 2026, State Minister for Local Government, Rural Development and Cooperatives Mir Shahe Alam sparked controversy by stating that gifts given by contractors to engineers from their profits after project completion would not constitute bribery. The remarks drew criticism from Transparency International Bangladesh (TIB) and various analysts, who warned that such statements could legitimize bribery and encourage corruption.

On Sunday, September 13, 2026, during a conversation with journalists at the Secretariat, State Minister Mir Shahe Alam stated that he had not needed any educational qualifications to become a Member of Parliament either. Although Bangladeshi law does not require candidates to have specific educational qualifications to contest elections, education and intellectual development remain important in politics. In this context, his remarks are questionable. Such statements risk downplaying the importance of education in politics and discouraging recognition of its value in political leadership.

State Minister for Local Government, Rural Development and Cooperatives Mir Shahe Alam sparked controversy with his negative remarks about both spouses working. He stated that it was better for only one spouse in a family to be employed, arguing that having both parents work could affect their children's upbringing. Women's rights activists, academics, and analysts criticized his remarks, saying they ran counter to women's employment and equal rights and could reinforce patriarchal social attitudes. They also noted that the minister's statements contradicted the BNP's commitments in its election manifesto to women's empowerment and the expansion of daycare facilities.
