= Wages Earners Welfare Fund =

Wages Earners’ Welfare Fund
- Formation: 1990
- Headquarters: Dhaka, Bangladesh
- Region served: Bangladesh
- Official language: Bengali
- Website: www.wewb.gov.bd

Wages Earners’ Welfare Fund is a Bangladesh government fund that was created for the welfare of migrant workers and financed by mandatory contributions from migrant workers under the Ministry of Expatriates' Welfare and Overseas Employment. It is managed by the Wage Earners' Welfare Board.

== History ==
Wages Earners’ Welfare Fund was established in 1990 based on the Emigration Ordinance of 1982. Its formation was supported by Promoting Decent Work through Improved Migration Policy and its Application in Bangladesh, a project of International Labour Organization. An audit in 2003 found 390 million taka was embezzled from the fund between 1997 and 2001. The government uses the fund to bring the bodies of dead migrant workers back to Bangladesh.
