= Secretary General of the Bangladesh Nationalist Party =

Political post of the Bangladesh Nationalist Party

- বাংলাদেশ জাতীয়তাবাদী দলের মহাসচিব
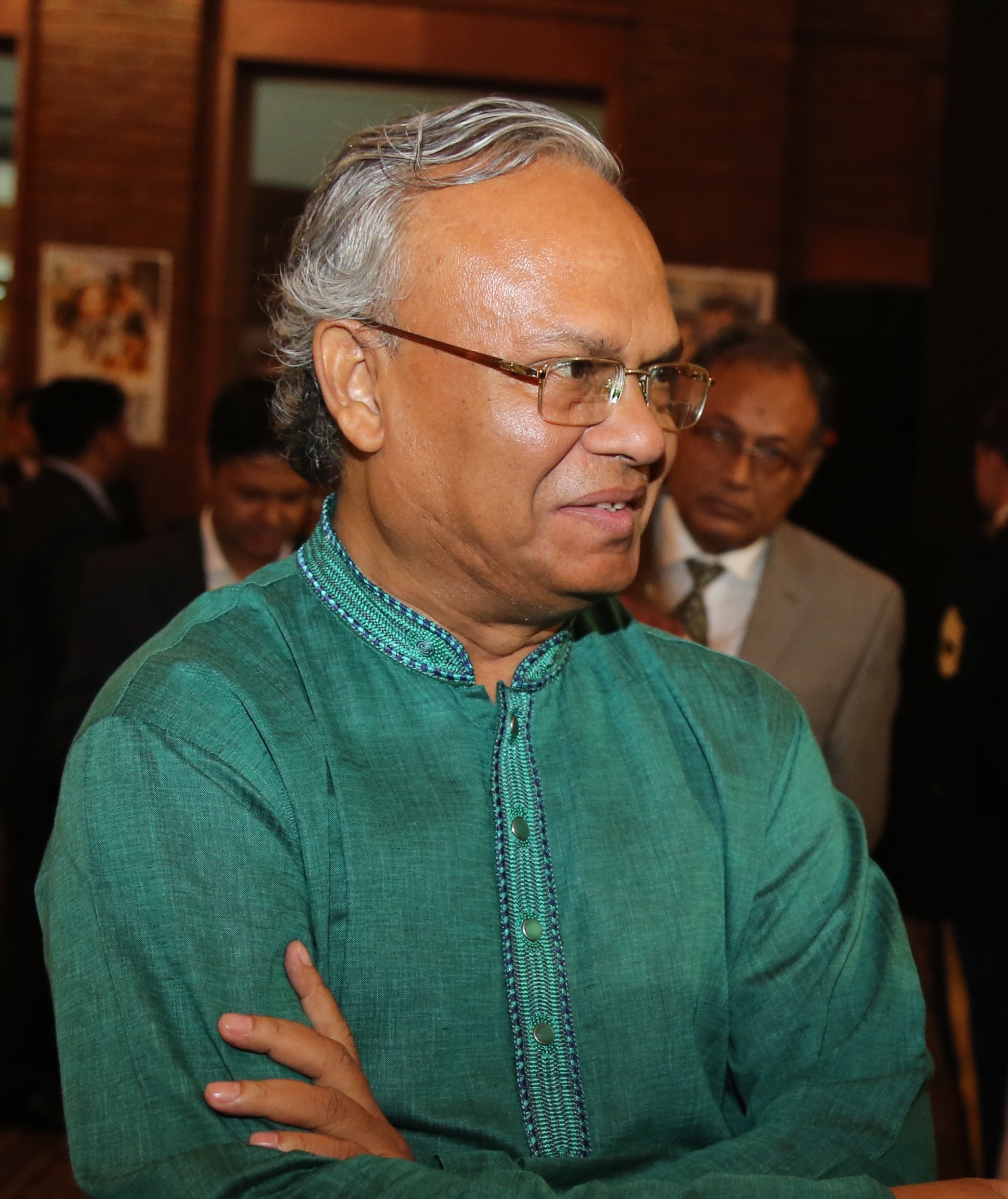
- Incumbent; Ruhul Kabir Rizvi; Acting since 20 August 2026
- National Standing Committee of the Bangladesh Nationalist Party
- Type: Party executive
- Reports to: Standing committee
- Appointer: Chairman
- Constituting instrument: Constitution of the Bangladesh Nationalist Party
- Inaugural holder: A. Q. M. Badruddoza Chowdhury
- Formation: 1 September 1978

The secretary general of the Bangladesh Nationalist Party is the executive officer of the Bangladesh Nationalist Party (BNP), a major political party in Bangladesh. The secretary general has direct control over all departments in the party. The secretary general also serves as an advisor to all departments when not directly making decisions. The secretary general has holistic view over a wide range of issues, ranging from staff appointments to dismissal and approval of the Party's executive branch members. The secretary general is also responsible for verifying documents, including election expenditures, and delegating functions among the party's organisational editors in consultation with the party chairman.

== List of general secretaries ==
General Secretary	Start of term	End of term	Chairperson
A. Q. M. Badruddoza Chowdhury	1979	1981	Ziaur Rahman
A. Q. M. Badruddoza Chowdhury	1979	1981	Abdus Sattar
Nurul Islam Shishu	1981	1985	Abdus Sattar
Nurul Islam Shishu	1981	1985	Khaleda Zia
Abu Saleh Mohammad Mustafizur Rahman	1985	1986	Khaleda Zia
KM Obaidur Rahman	1986	1988	Khaleda Zia
Abdus Salam Talukder	1991	1996	Khaleda Zia
Abdul Mannan Bhuiyan	1996	2007	Khaleda Zia
Khandaker Delwar Hossain	2007	2011	Khaleda Zia
Mirza Fakhrul Islam Alamgir	2011	2026	Khaleda Zia
Mirza Fakhrul Islam Alamgir	2011	2026	Khaleda Zia (until 2025); Tarique Rahman (since 2025)
Ruhul Kabir Rizvi	2026	Present	Tarique Rahman
