= Shahaduzzaman =

Bangladesh Jamaat-e-Islami politician

Member of Bangladesh Parliament

Personal details
- Party: Bangladesh Jamaat-e-Islami

Shahaduzzaman is a Bangladesh Jamaat-e-Islami politician and a former member of parliament for Bogra-2.

== Career ==
Shahaduzzaman was elected to parliament from Bogra-2 as a Bangladesh Jamaat-e-Islami candidate in 1991.

A year after Bangladesh Jamaat-e-Islami's charter had been ruled unconstitutional, Shahaduzzaman was arrested, on 8 August 2014, at what was allegedly a secret party meeting.
