= S. M. Ziauddin Hyder =

Bangladeshi public health expert, nutritionist, development worker

- এস. এম. জিয়াউদ্দিন হায়দার

Special Assistant for Health Affairs
- Incumbent
- Assumed office 22 April 2026
- Prime Minister: Tarique Rahman

Personal details
- Born: Jhalokati Sadar Upazila
- Education: Sher-e-Bangla Medical College, Umeå University
- Occupation: Politician

S. M. Ziauddin Hyder is a Bangladeshi public health expert, nutritionist, development worker, teacher and politician. He has worked in public health, nutrition and development in various countries across Asia, Africa and South America for more than three decades. He served for many years as a senior health specialist at World Bank. In April 2026, he was appointed Special Assistant to the Prime Minister for Health Affairs with the rank of a state minister. He previously served as an adviser to the chairperson of Bangladesh Nationalist Party (BNP) and as a member of its election management committee.

== Early life and education ==
He was born in Naikathi village of Jhalokathi Sadar Upazila. His father Hormuz Ali was a senior assistant secretary in Bangladesh government. He obtained his MBBS degree from Sher-e-Bangla Medical College. He later completed a master's degree in Food and Nutrition Planning from University of the Philippines. He received a PhD from Umeå University. His doctoral research focused on nutrition and epidemiology.

== Career ==
As a public health specialist and development professional, Hyder worked for 30 years in 35 countries across Asia, Africa and South America on sustainable health, nutrition and development. He served as a senior health specialist at World Bank and was the cluster leader for health, nutrition and population programs in Cambodia and Laos until February 2024. He also taught at BRAC University and University of Toronto.

=== Political career ===
Hyder became involved in politics during his student years. He was a joint convener of first committee of Dhaka College Chhatra Dal. During 1980s, he served as a vice-president of Barisal District Chhatra Dal. He also served as president of Sher-e-Bangla Medical College Chhatra Dal.

After retiring from World Bank, he was appointed a member of BNP Chairperson's Advisory Council in March 2025. Later, during 13th general election, he was appointed a member of BNP's central election management committee.

== Appointment ==
On 22 April 2026, Ministry of Public Administration issued a notification Special Assistant to the Prime Minister for Health Affairs with the rank of a state minister.

According to notification, he was appointed on a contractual basis and will serve from the date of joining until the expiration of the Prime Minister's term or until further notice, subject to the satisfaction of the Prime Minister.
