= Mozaffar Hossain (Bogra politician) =

Bangladeshi politician (died 2018)

Member of Bangladesh Parliament

Personal details
- Died: 10 June 2018 Dhaka, Bangladesh
- Party: Jatiya Party (Ershad)

Mozaffar Hossain was a Jatiya Party (Ershad) politician in Bangladesh and member of parliament for Bogra-2.

== Career ==
Hossain was elected to parliament from Bogra-4 as a Bangladesh Awami League candidate in 1973. He was elected to parliament from Bogra-2 as a Jatiya Party candidate in 1986. He founded Shibganj Government M.H. College in Bogra District. He served as the minister of agriculture and forest.

== Death ==
Hossain died on 10 June 2018 in Dhaka, Bangladesh.
