= Bangladesh Overseas Employment and Services Limited =

- Abbreviation: BOESL
- Formation: 1984
- Type: Government-owned company
- Headquarters: Dhaka, Bangladesh
- Region served: Bangladesh
- Official language: Bengali
- Managing Director: Dr. Mallick Anwar Hossain
- Parent organization: Ministry of Expatriates' Welfare and Overseas Employment
- Website: www.boesl.gov.bd

Bangladesh Overseas Employment and Services Limited is a government owned manpower export company located in Dhaka, Bangladesh.

As Bangladeshi unskilled workers go to work abroad, their family income doubles. In addition, two-thirds of Bangladeshis who return to the country after working abroad for a few year are entrepreneurs or start their own businesses.

== History ==
The organization was established in 1984. The company exports manpower from Bangladesh to a number of countries.
