= Mahdi Amin =

Bangladeshi political adviser (born 1986)

- মাহদী আমিন
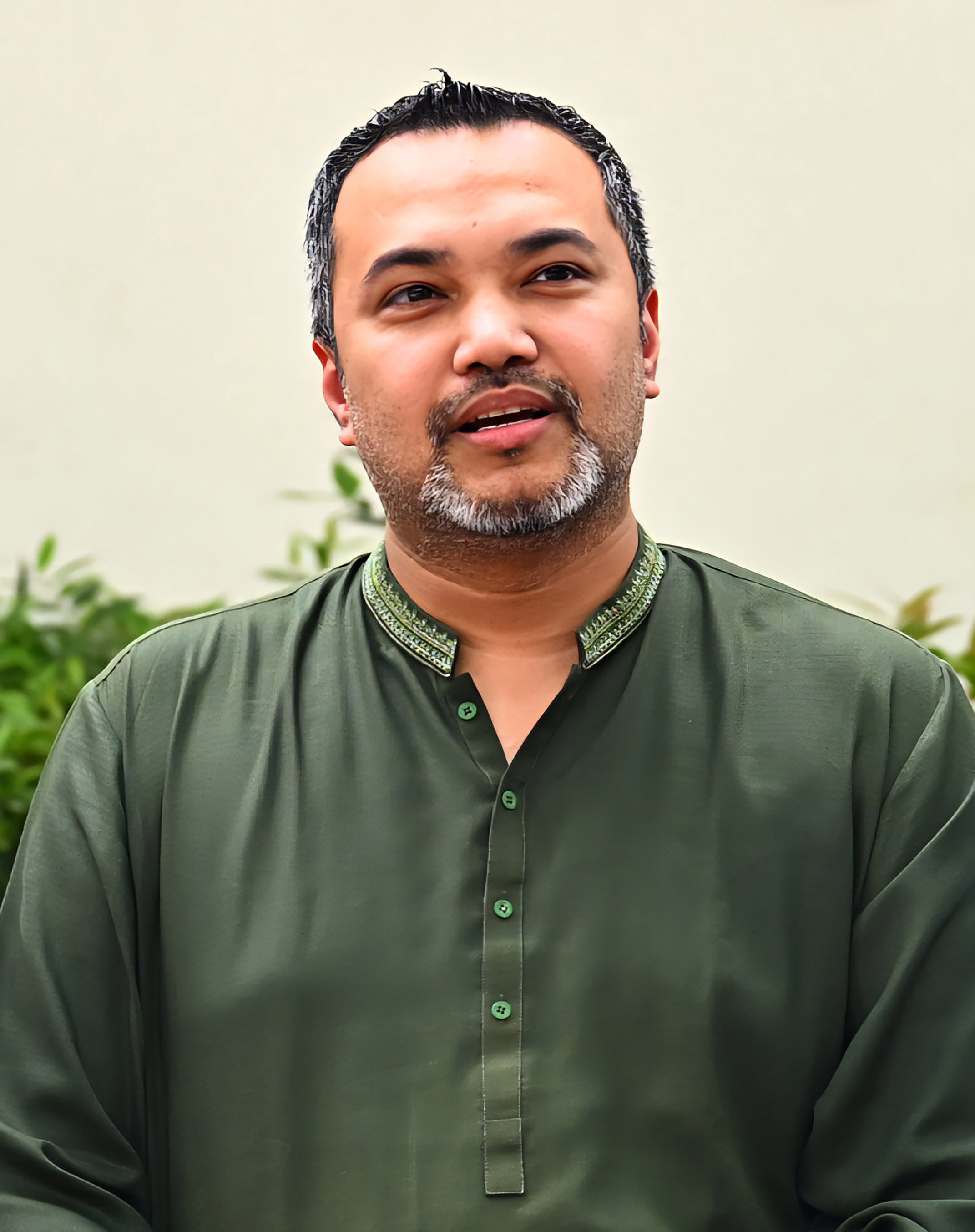
- Amin in 2026

Adviser to the Prime Minister of Bangladesh
- Incumbent
- Assumed office 17 February 2026
- Prime Minister: Tarique Rahman

Spokesperson of Prime Minister Office
- Incumbent
- Assumed office 5 April 2026
- Prime Minister: Tarique Rahman

Personal details
- Born: Dhaka, Bangladesh
- Party: Bangladesh Nationalist Party
- Education: Middlesex University; University of Cambridge
- Occupation: Politician, policy analyst, academic

Mahdi Amin (Bengali: মাহদী আমিন) is a Bangladeshi politician, policy analyst and political adviser. He serves as an adviser to Prime Minister of Bangladesh and the spokesperson of the Prime Minister’s Office, with the rank of state minister. As Prime Minister's adviser, he will handle responsibilities for the Ministry of Education, Ministry of Primary and Mass Education, Ministry of Expatriate Welfare and Overseas Employment, and Ministry of Labour and Employment. Previously, he was Education Policy and Research Adviser to Rahman in his capacity as chairperson of the Bangladesh Nationalist Party (BNP). Amin also served as spokesperson for the BNP's Central Election Management Committee during the 2026 Bangladeshi general election, in which the party won a landslide victory.

Amin has contributed to BNP policy development, notably the party's 31-point reform charter, emphasizing inclusive development, youth empowerment, state reforms, vocational education and the adaptation of global best practices to local governance contexts. He is the founder and president of the Bangladesh Policy Forum Cambridge, a think tank focused on socioeconomic development policies in South Asia.

== Early life and education ==
Amin completed his secondary education at Dhanmondi Government Boys' High School and higher secondary education at Dhaka College. He earned a Bachelor of Arts in Business Administration from Middlesex University, graduating first in his class with distinction. He later obtained a certificate in the Political Economy of Public Policy from the London School of Economics and participated in an exchange programme at City University of New York (Baruch College).

In 2010, Amin received an MPhil in Modern South Asian Studies from the University of Cambridge, with a focus on the history, politics, and policy-making of Bangladesh and the subcontinent. His thesis analyses technological integration in South Asian government policy-making, using India as a case study, under the supervision of Jaideep Prabhu and Sir Christopher Bayly. He pursued doctoral studies at Cambridge, focusing on electric vehicle industry and green technology.

Amin founded the Bangladesh Policy Forum Cambridge, a think tank he presides over, with affiliate chapters in the United States, Canada, Australia, Germany, Finland, and Bangladesh.

== Political career ==
Amin's association with Tarique Rahman began in 2011 during his time at the University of Cambridge, where he participated in policy discussions with Bangladeshi academics in Britain. He contributed to developing BNP policies on inclusive development and state reforms, with emphasis on education, vocational training, youth empowerment, and leveraging Bangladesh's demographic dividend. In 2014, he was formally appointed Education and Research Adviser to Rahman, then BNP Senior Vice-Chairman, in one of Rahman's first such roles, drawing significant media coverage.

Amin helped shape the BNP's 31-point reform charter, which priorities accountability, transparency, financial empowerment, anti-corruption measures, judicial independence, bicameral parliamentary considerations, and people-centric governance. He has advocated for practical, culturally aligned reforms inspired by Westminster system democracy, while opposing experimental changes such as alterations to voting age, term limits, or constitutional naming conventions.

In 2024, Amin joined the BNP's Foreign Affairs Advisory Committee. Ahead of the 13th Jatiya Sangsad election and associated referendum in February 2026, he served as spokesperson for the party's Central Election Management Committee. He held regular press briefings at BNP's Gulshan office, accusing rivals of fomenting instability, spreading propaganda, election engineering, exploiting religion, and expelling BNP agents. Amin described the BNP's victory as "inevitable" and a "triumph for democracy," crediting public support for the party's dhaner shish (rice sheaf) symbol.

On 17 February 2026, following the BNP's landslide win, Amin was appointed one of ten advisers to Prime Minister Tarique Rahman, with state minister rank. He has publicly commended improvements in law enforcement under the prior interim government, pledged protection of constitutional rights, advocated introducing services like PayPal for digital financial inclusion, and highlighted BNP's historical contributions to multiparty democracy, manpower exports, and garment industry growth.

== Personal life ==
He is married and has one son and one daughter.
