= Ministry of Expatriates' Welfare and Overseas Employment =

Government ministry of Bangladesh

Ministry of Expatriates’ Welfare and Overseas Employment
- প্রবাসী কল্যাণ ও বৈদেশিক কর্মসংস্থান মন্ত্রণালয়
- Government Seal of Bangladesh

Ministry overview
- Formed: 20 December 2001; 24 years ago
- Jurisdiction: Government of Bangladesh
- Headquarters: Bangladesh Secretariat, Dhaka
- Annual budget: ৳880 crore (US$72 million) (2026-2027)
- Minister responsible: Ariful Haque Choudhury
- Minister of State responsible: Nurul Haque Nur
- Ministry executives: Md. Ruhul Amin, Secretary
- Child agencies: Bureau of Manpower, Employment and Training; Wage Earners' Welfare Board; Bangladesh Overseas Employment and Services Limited; Probashi Kallyan Bank
- Website: probashi.gov.bd

The Ministry of Expatriates’ Welfare and Overseas Employment (Bengali: প্রবাসী কল্যাণ ও বৈদেশিক কর্মসংস্থান মন্ত্রণালয়) is a ministry of the government of the People's Republic of Bangladesh, responsible for overseeing matters related to overseas Bangladeshis and foreign employment.

Established on December 20, 2001, the ministry was created to ensure the welfare of expatriate workers and to expand foreign employment opportunities. It plays a significant role in addressing unemployment and facilitating remittances, which contribute to the national economy.

== Departments ==
- Bureau of Manpower, Employment and Training
- Wage Earners' Welfare Board (WEWB)
- Bangladesh Overseas Employment and Services Limited (BOESL)
- Probashi Kallyan Bank

== Ministers ==
Portrait	Minister (Birth-Death) Constituency	Term of office			Political party	Ministry	Prime Minister
Portrait	Minister (Birth-Death) Constituency	From	To	Period	Political party	Ministry	Prime Minister
	Major (Retd); Mohammad Quamrul Islam মেজর (অবসরপ্রাপ্ত) মোহাম্মদ কামরুল ইসলাম; MP for Dhaka-5 (State Minister)	20 December 2001	9 July 2006	4 years, 201 days	Bangladesh Nationalist Party	Khaleda III	Khaleda Zia
	Lutfor Rahman Khan Azad লুৎফর রহমান খান আজাদ; MP for Tangail-3 (State Minister)	9 July 2006	29 October 2006	112 days	Bangladesh Nationalist Party	Khaleda III	Khaleda Zia
	Sufia Rahman সুফিয়া রহমান (Adviser)	26 October 2006	11 January 2007	77 days	Independent	Iajuddin	Iajuddin Ahmed
	Iftekhar Ahmed Chowdhury ইফতেখার আহমেদ চৌধুরী (born 1946) (Adviser)	11 January 2007	6 January 2009	1 year, 361 days	Independent	Fakhruddin	Fakhruddin Ahmed
	Khandaker Mosharraf Hossain খন্দকার মোশাররফ হোসেন (born 1942); MP for Faridpur-3	6 January 2009	9 July 2015	6 years, 184 days	Awami League	Hasina II	Sheikh Hasina
	Khandaker Mosharraf Hossain খন্দকার মোশাররফ হোসেন (born 1942); MP for Faridpur-3	6 January 2009	9 July 2015	6 years, 184 days	Awami League	Hasina III	Sheikh Hasina
	Nurul Islam BSc নুরুল ইসলাম বিএসসি (born 1938); MP for Chittagong-8	9 July 2015	7 January 2019	3 years, 182 days	Awami League	Hasina III	Sheikh Hasina
	Imran Ahmad ইমরান আহমেদ (born 1948); MP for Sylhet-4 (State Minister until 12 July 2019)	7 January 2019	10 January 2024	5 years, 3 days	Awami League	Hasina IV	Sheikh Hasina
	Shafiqur Rahaman Chowdhury শফিকুর রহমান চৌধুরী (born 1957); MP for Sylhet-2 (State Minister)	11 January 2024	6 August 2024	208 days	Awami League	Hasina V	Sheikh Hasina
	Asif Nazrul আসিফ নজরুল (born 1966) (Adviser)	16 August 2024	17 February 2026	1 year, 185 days	Independent	Yunus	Muhammad Yunus
	Ariful Haque Choudhury আরিফুল হক চৌধুরী (born 1959); MP for Sylhet-4	17 February 2026	Incumbent	244 days	Bangladesh Nationalist Party	Tarique	Tarique Rahman

== State Ministers ==
Portrait	Minister (Birth-Death) Constituency	Term of office			Political party	Ministry	Prime Minister
Portrait	Minister (Birth-Death) Constituency	From	To	Period	Political party	Ministry	Prime Minister
	Nurul Haque Nur নুরুল হক নুর (born 1994); MP for Patuakhali-3	17 February 2026	Incumbent	244 days	Gono Odhikar Parishad	Tarique	Tarique Rahman
