= Bureau of Manpower Employment and Training =

Bangladeshi government department

- Abbreviation: BMET
- Formation: 1976
- Headquarters: Dhaka, Bangladesh
- Region served: Bangladesh
- Director General: Saleh Ahmed Mujaffar
- Director Operations: Engr. Md. Salah Uddin
- Parent organization: Ministry of Expatriates' Welfare and Overseas Employment
- Website: Bureau of Manpower Employment and Training
- Remarks: 130635

Bureau of Manpower Employment and Training is government department that is responsible for the training and employment of Bangladeshi overseas and is located in Dhaka, Bangladesh.Saleh Ahmed Mojaffar is the Director General and Engr. Md. Salahuddin is the Director Operations of BMET.

== History ==
Bureau of Manpower Employment and Training was established in 1976 under the Ministry of Manpower Development and Social Welfare as a department. They provide Bangladeshi workers with Smart cards, Biometric registration, and immigration clearance. The Bureau explores the opportunities for Bangladeshi labor force outside the country. It operates the Institute of Marine Technology and runs it under its supervision among other technical educational centres.

== Key Officials ==
- Saleh Ahmed Mujaffar - Director General (Additional Secretary)
- Shah Abdul Tarik - Additional Director General
- Engr.Md.Salah Uddin - Director Operations
- Md. Masud Rana - Director Admin
- Engr Mohammad Nuruzzaman - Deputy Director
- Dewan Md. Nazmul Hoque - Deputy Director
- Mohammad Jahangir Hossain - Deputy Director
- Md. Abu Rayhan - System Analyst

== Institutes ==
- Bangladesh Institute of Marine Technology
- Bangladesh Korea Technical Training Centre, Chittagong
- Bangladesh Korea Technical Training Centre, Dhaka
- Institute of Marine Technology, Chadpur
- Institute of Marine Technology, Munshiganj
- Institute of Marine Technology, Faridpur
- Institute of Marine Technology, Bagerhat
- Institute of Marine Technology, Sirajganj
