= Zahed Ur Rahman =

Bangladeshi political analyst and physician

- জাহেদ উর রহমান
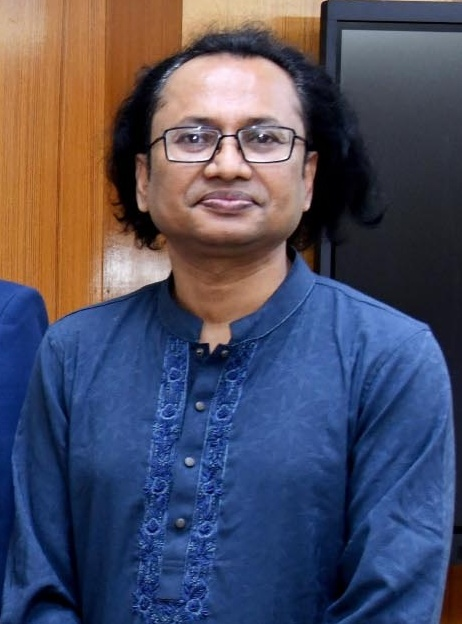
- Zahed Ur Rahman in 2026

Adviser to the Prime Minister of Bangladesh
- Incumbent
- Assumed office 17 February 2026
- Prime Minister: Tarique Rahman

Personal details
- Party: Independent (2026-present
- Other political affiliations: Nagorik Oikko (2012 – 2026)
- Education: Dhaka Medical College (MBBS)
- Occupation: Physician, columnist, political analyst
- Known for: Columns and analysis on contemporary politics and society

Zahed Ur Rahman is a Bangladeshi physician, media personality, columnist, and political analyst who currently serves as an Adviser to the Prime Minister of Bangladesh with the status of a State Minister. He was appointed to the position on February 17, 2026, under the administration of Prime Minister Tarique Rahman.

== Early life and education ==
Rahman's ancestral home is in Kotra Mohabbatpur village, Gopalpur Union of Begumganj Upazila, in Noakhali District. He spent much of his childhood in Chandraghona town of Kaptai Upazila located on the banks of the Karnaphuli River, where he lived due to his father’s employment. He completed his Secondary education from Karnaphuli Paper Mills High School in 1991. He completed his Higher secondary education from Government Hazi Mohammad Mohsin College, Chittagong and earned his bachelor degree in medicine and surgery from Dhaka Medical College. He did an MBA from Institute of Business Administration (IBA), DU.

== Career ==
Zahed Ur Rahman covers a wide range of topics, his writing and TV analysis places particular emphasis on Bangladesh's democracy, elections, political violence, enforced disappearances, and human rights issues. Among his works, notable are the analytical pieces published in Prothom Alo during the 2025–2026 period, which examine Bangladesh's elections, political consensus, and authoritarian trends.

He presents his views on various contemporary issues through his YouTube and Facebook channel, "Zahed's Take." Through this channel, he regularly publishes videos addressing various questions concerning the politics, statecraft, and social dynamics of Bangladesh.

He was a member of the Election System Reform Commission formed by the Interim government of Muhammad Yunus.

He was appointed as the Adviser on Policy and Strategy to the Prime Minister Tarique Rahman on 17 February 2026.
