= Bangladesh Institute of Marine Technology =

Institute In Bangladesh

Bangladesh Institute of Marine Technology (BIMT)
- Type: Public
- Established: 1958
- Principal: Muhammad Khurshed Alam
- Location: Narayanganj, Bangladesh; 23.6070°N 90.5087°E
- Website: bimt.gov.bd

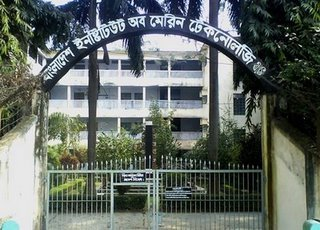
River side gate

Bangladesh Institute of Marine Technology (BIMT), in Narayanganj, is a state-supported institute that offers four-year higher level diploma programs, including a Diploma in Engineering Marine Technology and a Diploma in Engineering Shipbuilding Technology. BIMT also supports four different courses of study in engineering.

== History ==
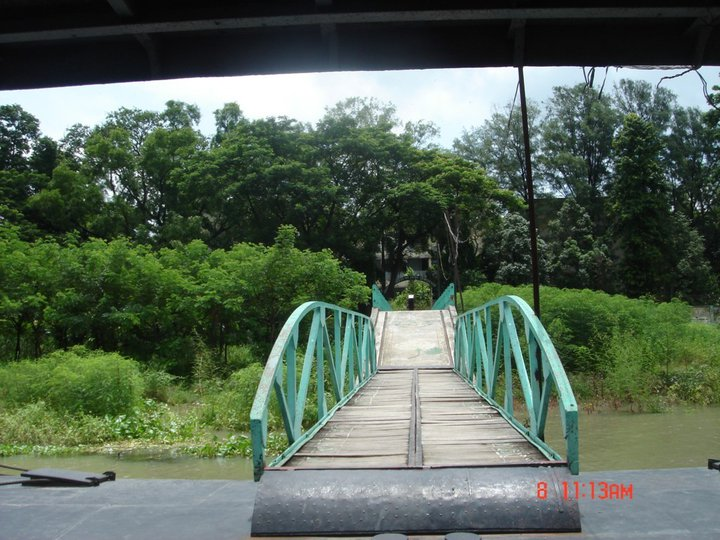
River side view

The institute was established in 1958. It was known as the Marine Diesel Training Center (MDTC) since 1960. On December 10, 1979, it was renamed as Bangladesh Institute of Marine Technology.

== Campus ==
BIMT is situated on 9 acres (3.6 ha) campus on the east bank of the Shitalakshya River in Bandar Upazila. Across the river lies the city of Narayanganj, most easily reached by boat. The Tribenee Canal marks the southern boundary of campus.

== Organization and administration ==
The institute is controlled by the Bureau of Manpower, Employment and Training (BMET) under the Ministry of Expatriates Welfare and Overseas Employment.

== Academics ==
BIMT offers four-year courses of study; leading to such as "Diploma in Engineering Marine Technology" & "Diploma in Engineering Shipbuilding Technology" Equivalent to Undergraduate Engineering. It also offers two-year trade courses:

- Marine Diesel Engine Artificer (Equivalent to H.S.C) 2 years National Diploma
- Ship Fabrication (Equivalent to H.S.C) 2 Years national Diploma
- Shipbuilding & Mechanical Draftsmanship (Equivalent to H.S.C) 2 Years National Diploma
- Shipbuilding Welding (Equivalent to H.S.C) 2 Years National Diploma

== Scholarship and stipend ==
Stipend are given every student for Diploma course BDT275.00 & for trade BDT250.00. For getting the stiffened, every student must be present 80% in their class. When a student goes for "On the job training" Then, they get BDT500.00 for Diploma and BDT450.00 for trade courses.
