= Ruhul Kabir Rizvi =

Bangladeshi politician

- রুহুল কবীর রিজভী
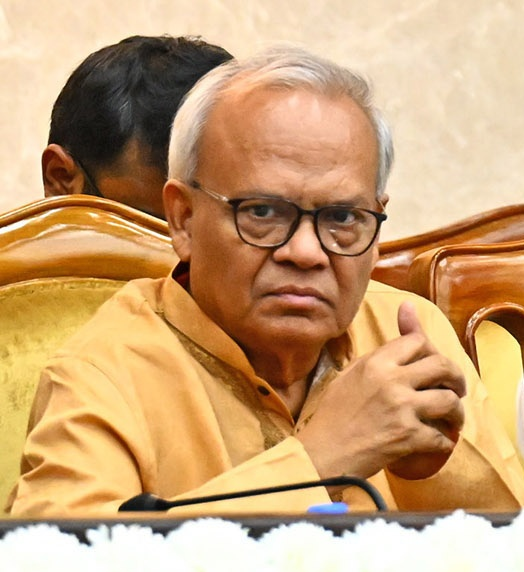
- Rizvi in July 2026

Adviser to the Prime Minister of Bangladesh
- Incumbent
- Assumed office 17 February 2026
- Prime Minister: Tarique Rahman

Secretary General of the Bangladesh Nationalist Party
- Incumbent
- Assumed office 20 August 2026
- Chairman: Tarique Rahman
- Preceded by: Mirza Fakhrul Islam Alamgir

Spokenperson & Senior Joint Secretary General of Bangladesh Nationalist Party
- In office 19 March 2016 – 20 August 2026
- Chairperson: Khaleda Zia; Tarique Rahman

Personal details
- Born: Ruhul Kabir Rizvi Ahmed Kurigram District, Bangladesh
- Party: Bangladesh Nationalist Party (BNP)
- Education: University of Rajshahi
- Occupation: Politician

Ruhul Kabir Rizvi is a Bangladeshi politician and lawyer. He is an adviser to the prime minister of Bangladesh, Tarique Rahman with the rank of minister. He is the acting secretary general, member of National Standing Committee and spokesperson of Bangladesh Nationalist Party.

== Early life ==
Ruhul Kabir Rizvi's ancestral home is in Kurigram District. He earned master's degrees in Geography and Environmental Studies and History from the University of Rajshahi, as well as a bachelor's degree in Law. He also served as vice president of the university's student union. His early involvement in student politics during his academic years laid the foundation for his political career.

== Career ==
Ruhul Kabir Rizvi began his involvement in student politics after completing his higher secondary education through the left-wing Biplobi Chhatra Union, serving as general secretary of its Rajshahi Government College unit.

Following the establishment of Bangladesh Jatiotabadi Chatra Dal, Rizvi joined the organisation and became publicity secretary of its University of Rajshahi unit. He later served as general secretary of the university unit and subsequently as central president of Bangladesh Jatiotabadi Chatra Dal.

In 1989, Ruhul Kabir Rizvi was elected vice-president (VP) of the Rajshahi University Central Students' Union (RUCSU) as a candidate from the Chhatra Dal panel. He served in the position until 1990.

At the BNP's sixth national council on 19 March 2016, Rizvi was elected Senior Joint Secretary General of the party. In December 2024 during widespread of boycott India campaign, Rizvi protested against India's aggression by burning his wife's Indian sari. He called for boycotting Indian products and encouraging the use of domestic products.

Later that year he made controversial statements suggesting that Bihar, West Bengal, and Odisha should join Bangladesh as states and called for a boycott of Indian products. He was appointed as the member secretary of the BNP's election management committee for the 2026 national parliamentary elections. On 15 August 2026, he became a member of the National Standing Committee, the highest policy-making forum of the Bangladesh Nationalist Party (BNP).

=== Political adviser to the Prime Minister ===
He was appointed as a political adviser to the Prime Minister of Bangladesh, Tarique Rahman. He holds the rank of minister in this role. As an adviser, he provides guidance and support on government policies and administrative matters and will handle responsibilities for the Ministry of Industries.

In August 2026, following the cancellation of Prime Minister Tarique Rahman's proposed visit to India, Prime Minister's Political Adviser Ruhul Kabir Rizvi stated that Bangladesh's relations with other countries should be based on equality and respect for their independence and sovereignty. He added that the government would welcome an invitation from India extended in a friendly manner and without conditions or vested interests.

=== BNP's secretary general ===
On 20 August 2026, he was appointed Acting Secretary General of the Bangladesh Nationalist Party, following the resignation of then Secretary General Mirza Fakhrul Islam Alamgir after his election as President. Alamgir formally resigned from the post on the same day, after which the BNP nominated him as his successor.

== Personal life ==
Rizvi is married to Anjuman Ara.

Order of precedence
Preceded by Nazrul Islam Khan as Cabinet minister	Order of precedence of Bangladesh as Cabinet minister	Followed by Md. Ismail Zabihullah as Cabinet minister
