= Tanvir Ghani =

Bangladeshi policy adviser

Special Assistant to the Prime Minister in investment and capital market affairs
- Incumbent
- Assumed office 2 April 2026
- Prime Minister: Tarique Rahman

Personal details
- Education: Columbia University School of International and Public Affairs

Tanvir Ghani is a Bangladeshi policy adviser who serves as a special assistant to the Prime Minister on investment and capital market affairs with rank of a state minister of the Cabinet of Bangladesh. He works on policies related to economic development, investment promotion and the capital market sector of Bangladesh.

== Education ==
He completed his bachelor's degree in 2001 from Columbia University School of International and Public Affairs (SIPA), specializing in finance and business.

== Background ==
Before being appointed as Special Assistant, Ghani served as President of the Hong Kong-based Osiris Group. He is the President and co-founder of Tybourne Capital Management. He served as a managing director at Goldman Sachs, where he specialized in alternative asset management.

He has been involved in economic policy and financial sector development in Bangladesh. As special assistant to the Tarique Rahman, he advises the government on issues related to investment climate, capital market growth, and financial reforms. In this role, he works with government institutions, regulatory bodies and stakeholders to improve investment opportunities and strengthen the capital market.

=== Appointment as special assistant to the Prime Minister ===
According to a notification issued by Ministry of Public Administration on 2 April 2026, Tanvir Ghani has been appointed as the Special Assistant to the Prime Minister in foreign employment in the Asia-Pacific region as State minister rank.

As per the notification, he will serve on a contractual basis from his date of joining until the expiration of the Prime Minister's term or subject to the satisfaction of the Prime Minister, whichever occurs first.
