= Bridges Division =

Bangladeshi government department

- Formation: 2008
- Headquarters: Dhaka, Bangladesh
- Region served: Bangladesh
- Official language: Bengali
- Website: Bridges Division

Bridges Division (Bengali: সেতু বিভাগ) is a Bangladesh government division under the Ministry of Road Transport and Bridges responsible for construction of all bridges which are longer than 1.5 kilometer in Bangladesh.

== History ==
Bridges Division was established in March 2008 under the Ministry of Road Transport and Bridges to oversee the construction of bridges. On 14 October 2013, the Bridges Division signed an agreement with Bangladesh Army for consulting work on Padma Bridge worth 1.3 billion taka. Bangladesh army requested further 17 billion taka to construct security facilities and Padma Cantonment at the bridge site.
