= Nagorik Oikko =

Political party in Bangladesh

Nagorik Oikko নাগরিক ঐক্য
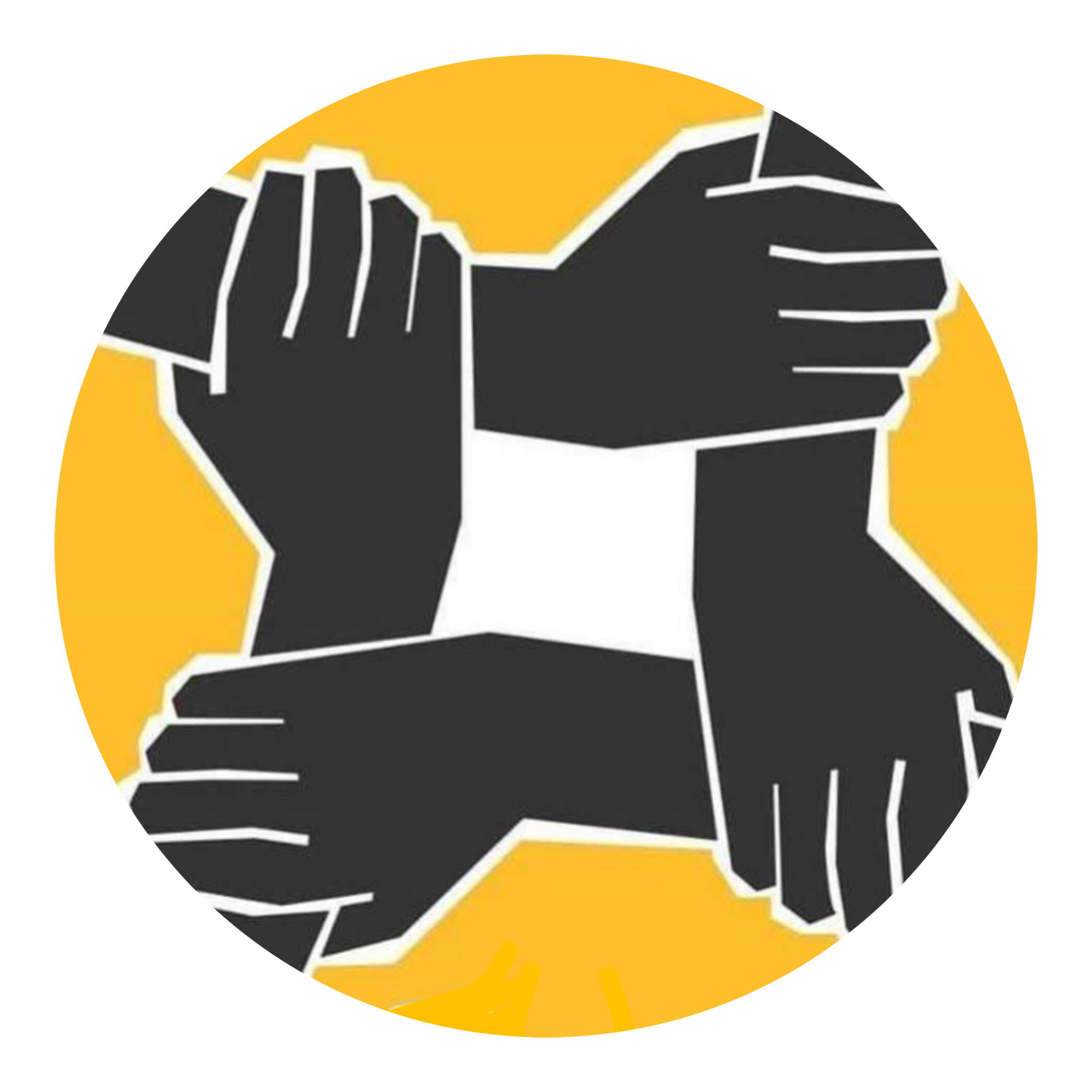
- Abbreviation: NO
- President: Mahmudur Rahman Manna
- General Secretary: Shahidullah Kaiser
- Founded: 1 June 2012 (14 years ago)
- Registered: 2 September 2024
- Split from: Awami League
- Headquarters: 22/1, Topkhana Road, Dhaka
- Student wing: Nagorik Chhatra Oikko
- Women's wing: Nagorik Nari Oikko
- Ideology: Liberalism (Bangladeshi)
- Political position: Centre
- Colors: Orange
- Bangladesh Parliament: 0 / 350

Election symbol
- Kettle

Party flag
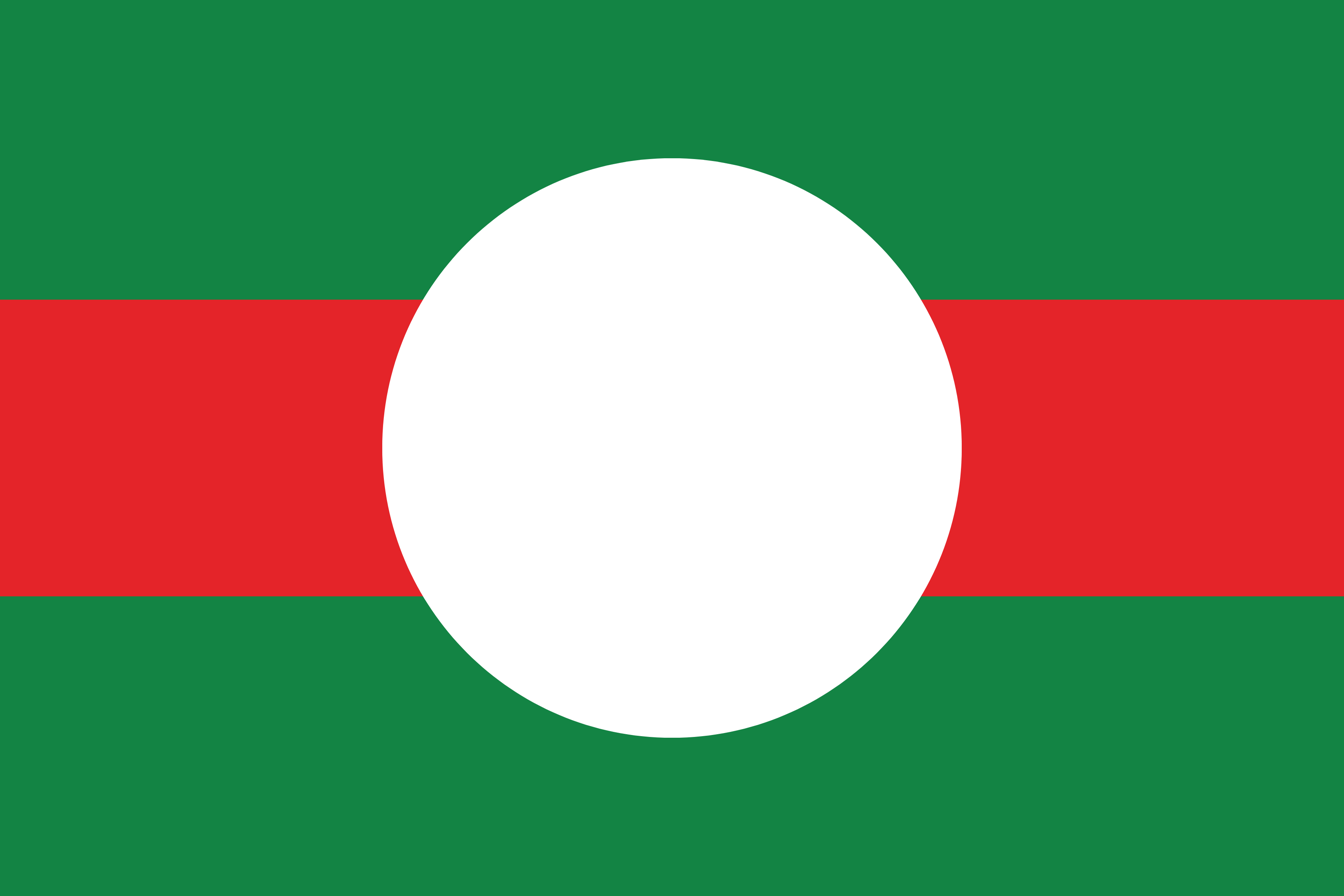

Website
- www.nagorikoikko.org

Nagorik Oikko (Bengali: নাগরিক ঐক্য, romanized: Nāgôrik Oikyô, lit. 'Citizens Unity') is a political party in Bangladesh. It was established by Mahmudur Rahman Manna in 2012.

== History ==
The party was established on 1 June 2012. Its founder is Mahmudur Rahman Manna, former organizational secretary of the Bangladesh Awami League. The party made its debut in 2012 with 3 advisors and a central committee of 186 members. Among the 3 advisors, one is journalist A. B. M. Musa, another is freedom fighter Abdullah Sarkar, and the remaining advisor is former Awami League leader, former secretary, and parliamentarian S. M. Akram. Founding members of the central committee include Piash Karim, senior journalist Abu Said Khan, Tuhin Malik, along with many other senior citizens, political figures, and valiant freedom fighters. The party is one of the partners of the Ganatantra Mancha.

On 2 September 2024, the party was registered with the Election Commission, and the party was given the 'Kettle' symbol. The party's registration number is 52.

They were expected to take part in the 2026 Bangladeshi general election with the BNP-led alliance, but later withdrew from the alliance and are participating independently.
