= A. K. M. Hafizur Rahman =

Bangladeshi politician

Member of Parliament

Personal details
- Party: Bangladesh Nationalist Party

A. K. M. Hafizur Rahman is a Bangladeshi politician and the incumbent Member of Parliament from Bogra-2.

== Career ==
Rahman was elected to Parliament from Bogra-2 as a Jatiya Party candidate in 2009.

== Personal life ==
Rahman was born in Baduratla in Bogra city. His first wife died on the 2002. He married Nargis Bari in the 2017.
