= Nazrul Islam Khan =

Bangladeshi politician

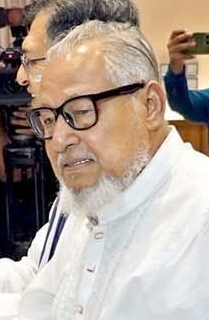
- Khan in 2025

Adviser to the Prime Minister of Bangladesh
- Incumbent
- Assumed office 17 February 2026
- Prime Minister: Tarique Rahman

Ambassador of Bangladesh to Kuwait
- In office July 2004 – August 2006
- Preceded by: Syeed Ahmed
- Succeeded by: A. I. M. Mostofa Reza Nur

Personal details
- Born: 1948 (age 77–78) Islampur Upazila, Jamalpur District
- Party: Bangladesh Nationalist Party (BNP)
- Occupation: Politician

Nazrul Islam Khan is a Bangladeshi politician. He is an adviser to the prime minister of Bangladesh, Tarique Rahman, with the rank of minister. He is also a member of the Bangladesh Nationalist Party's National Standing Committee. He is the BNP's polls coordination committee chief for the 2026 Bangladeshi general election.

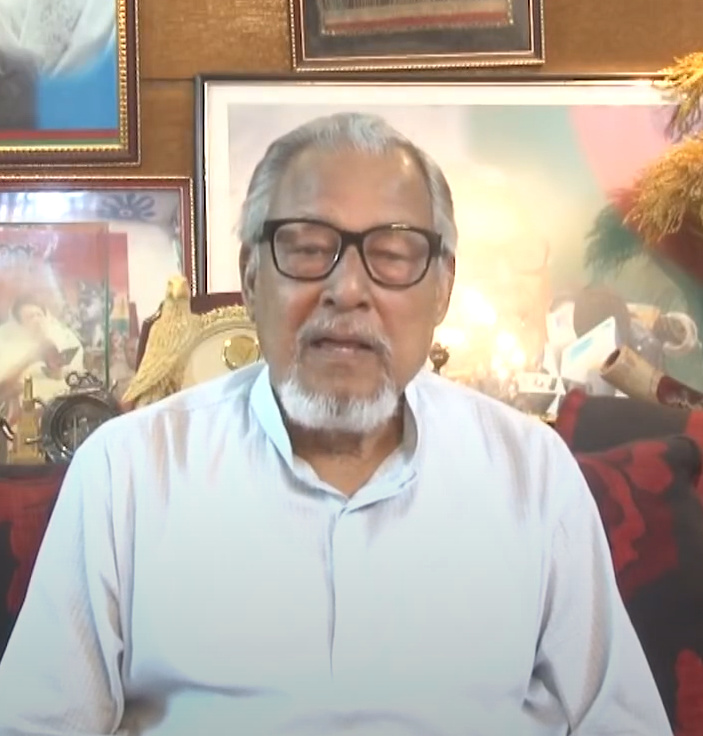
Nazrul Islam Khan in 2021

== Early life ==
Khan was an active worker of the labor movement in the 1970s. In 1970, he was the president of the Pakistan Machine Tools Factory (present Bangladesh Machine Tools Factory).

On the eve of the liberation war of Bangladesh, when the All-party Alliance Council was formed in Joydebpur of Gazipur in March 1971, Khan was appointed as treasurer.

== Career ==
Khan was the founding general secretary of Bangladesh Jatyatabadi Sramik Dal in 1979. He is a former president of Bangladesh Jatiyabadi Sramik Dal, serving in 2003. In 2004, Khan was appointed ambassador of Bangladesh to Kuwait. He was the BNP's polls coordination committee chief for the 2018 Bangladeshi general election.

=== Adviser to the Prime Minister ===
He was appointed as an adviser to the Prime Minister of Bangladesh, Tarique Rahman. He holds the rank of minister in this role. As an adviser, he provides guidance and support on government policies and administrative matters and will handle responsibilities for the Ministry of Agriculture.

Order of precedence
Preceded by Mirza Abbas as Cabinet minister	Order of precedence of Bangladesh as Cabinet minister	Followed by Ruhul Kabir Rizvi as Cabinet minister
