= Shakirul Islam Khan =

Bangladeshi politician

Special Assistant to the Prime Minister in overseas employment in the Asia-Pacific region
- Incumbent
- Assumed office 2 April 2026
- Prime Minister: Tarique Rahman

Personal details
- Education: Bangladesh Agricultural University
- Occupation: Researcher

Shakirul Islam Khan is a Bangladeshi researcher, migration expert and policy analyst. He serves as the Special Assistant to the Prime Minister of Bangladesh on overseas employment in the Asia-Pacific region, with the rank of secretary.

== Education ==
Khan was born in Bangladesh. In 2004, he obtained a Master of Science (MSc) degree in first class from Bangladesh Agricultural University. Earlier, in 2000, he earned a Bachelor of Science (BSc) degree in first class from the same university. In 2009, Dr Khan received his PhD degree from Ehime University. He completed his Master of Science (MSc) degree from the same institution in 2006 as a Japan International Cooperation Agency scholar.

Since 2021, Dr Shakirul Islam Khan has been serving as a full-time faculty member in the Department of Microbiology at the Research Center for Global and Local Infectious Diseases of Oita University. From 2014 to 2021, he worked as an Assistant Professor at the School of Medicine of Ehime University. He also served as a Research Fellow at the same university from 2011 to 2024. From 2010 to 2011, he was a Research Fellow at Universiti Putra Malaysia. In addition, he taught as a faculty member at Bangladesh Agricultural University from 2003 to 2019.

Dr Khan has supervised more than 30 graduate and postgraduate students in their research work. He has published over 150 scientific papers in internationally recognized peer-reviewed journals. He has received several awards, including a gold medal and best researcher awards, as well as numerous national and international honors and research grants.

== Career ==
He has worked extensively in the field of labor migration, migrant rights and safe migration governance. He is known for his research and advocacy on the protection of migrant workers, particularly those from Bangladesh working abroad. He has been associated with various national and international organizations, where he contributed to policy development, research and awareness programs related to migration and labor rights. His work often focuses on ethical recruitment, prevention of human trafficking, and ensuring decent work conditions for migrant workers and conducted research to improve treatment for dengue, bird flu, hepatitis, COVID-19, rabies and Nipah virus.

=== Appointment as Special Assistant to the Prime Minister ===
According to a notification issued by Ministry of Public Administration on 2 April 2026, Shakirul Islam Khan has been appointed as the Special Assistant to the Prime Minister in overseas employment in the Asia-Pacific region.

As per the notification, he will serve on a contractual basis from his date of joining until the expiration of the Prime Minister's term or subject to the satisfaction of the Prime Minister, whichever occurs first.
