= Rehan Asif Asad =

Bangladeshi engineer and ICT adviser

- রেহান আসিফ আসাদ
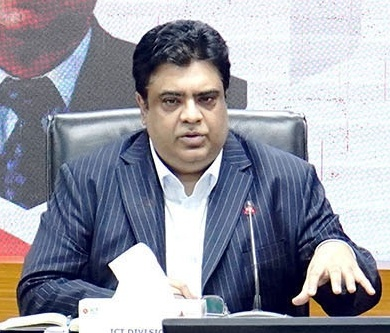
- Rehan Asif Asad meeting ICT Division officials at the ICT Building in Agargaon, Dhaka, 22 February 2026

Adviser to the Prime Minister of Bangladesh
- Incumbent
- Assumed office 17 February 2026
- Prime Minister: Tarique Rahman

Personal details
- Education: RMIT University; MIT Sloan School of Management
- Occupation: Engineer, technology professional

Rehan Asif Asad (রেহান আসিফ আসাদ) is a Bangladeshi engineer and technology professional who has served as an adviser to the Prime Minister of Bangladesh since February 2026. He was appointed with the rank of state minister.

He was assigned responsibility for the Ministry of Posts, Telecommunications and Information Technology and the Ministry of Science and Technology.

== Early life and education ==
Rehan Asif Asad was born in Kella Baruipara village in Godagari Upazila of Rajshahi District, Bangladesh. He is the son of M. Asaduzzaman, a former chairman and executive director of the Barind Multipurpose Development Authority. Asad studied telecommunications and electrical engineering at RMIT University in Australia, where he earned a bachelor's degree. He later completed a master's degree in management and engineering at the MIT Sloan School of Management in the United States.

== Career ==
Before entering government, Asad worked in the technology sector.

He was appointed an adviser to Prime Minister Tarique Rahman with the rank of state minister in February 2026 and was assigned responsibility for the Ministry of Posts, Telecommunications and Information Technology and the Ministry of Science and Technology.

He assumed charge of the two ministries on 22 February 2026.

In March 2026, the government formed a special committee to examine the requirements for launching PayPal services in Bangladesh. Asad was appointed chairman of the committee, which was also assigned responsibilities relating to high-tech and software parks, ICT centres, workspaces for freelancers and technology professionals, and ICT training programmes.
