= Rashed Al Mahmud Titumir =

Bangladeshi academic and politician

- Rashed Al Mahmud Titumir addressing United Nations High-Level Political Forum on Sustainable Development in New York

Adviser to the Prime Minister of Bangladesh
- Incumbent
- Assumed office 17 February 2026
- Prime Minister: Tarique Rahman

Personal details
- Born: Dhaka, Bangladesh
- Party: Bangladesh Nationalist Party
- Occupation: Politician, Economist, Educationist, Development Analyst

Rashed Al Mahmud Titumir is a Bangladeshi politician and an academic. He is an adviser to the prime minister of Bangladesh, Tarique Rahman with a ministerial rank. He oversees the Ministry of Finance and the Ministry of Planning. He is a Professor of Economics and former Chairman of the Department of Development Studies, University of Dhaka. He has worked in diverse constituencies, namely, academia, governments, think-tanks, international organizations, and media.

== Education ==
He studied his secondary education at Jhenaidah Cadet College. He holds an undergraduate degree from the University of Dhaka, and a master's degree in Development and Financial Economics and a Doctorate in Economics from the University of London. He also obtained a post-graduate diploma in Trade Policy and Commercial Diplomacy from Carleton University in Ottawa, Canada.

== Career ==
During his studies at the University of Dhaka, Rashed Al Mahmud Titumir was very active in journalism, writing regularly and working for eminent publications like the weekly Bichitra, the Daily Star, etc. He was the former director of policy for the Asian region for the renowned international NGO, Actionaid. He joined the University of Dhaka as an Assistant Professor of Economics at the Department of Development Studies in 2002. He became an Associate Professor in 2012 and a Full Professor of Economics in 2016. In August 2024, he was appointed to the Board of Directors of the Bangladesh Bank, the Central Bank of Bangladesh, for three years. He has provided advisory services to governments on multilateral negotiations such as WTO, UNFCCC, UNCBD. He has been contributing as a member of expert committees of various UN bodies. He is the founding Chairperson of Unnayan Onneshan, an independent think tank focused on sustainable development.

== Publications ==
Books

1. Why Agriculture Productivity Falls: The Political Economy of Agrarian Transition. Purdue University Press, 2023.

2. R.A.M. Titumir, T Afrin and M S Islam Natural Resource Degradation and Human-Nature Wellbeing: Cases of Biodiversity Resources, Water Resources, and Climate Change. Singapore: Springer, 2023.

3. State Building and Social Policies in Developing Countries: The Political Economy of Development. Oxon and New York: Routledge, 2023.

4. Sundarbans and its Ecosystem Services - Traditional Knowledge, Customary Sustainable Use and Community Based Innovation. Singapore: Palgrave Macmillan, 2022.

5. Fiscal and Monetary Policies in Developing Countries: State, Citizenship and Transformation. Oxon and New York: Routledge, 2022.

6. Numbers and Narratives in Bangladesh’s Economic Development. Singapore: Palgrave Macmillan, 2021.
