= Mahmudur Rahman Manna =

Bangladeshi politician

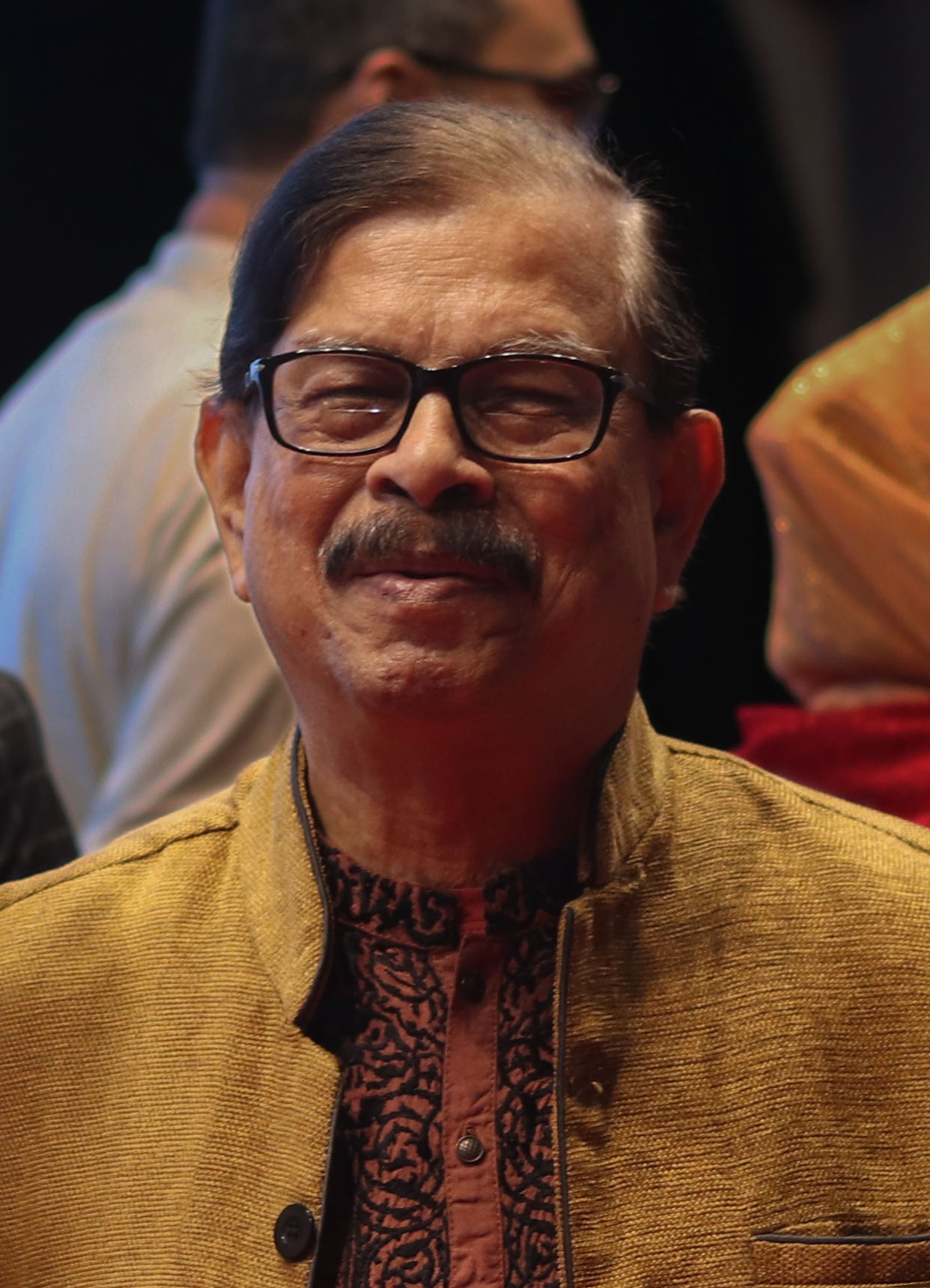
- Manna in 2025

President of Nagorik Oikko
- Incumbent
- Assumed office 1 June 2012
- General Secretary: Shahidullah Kaiser
- Preceded by: office established

Personal details
- Born: 1 November 1951 (age 75) Bogra, Rajshahi, Bangladesh
- Party: Nagorik Oikko
- Other political affiliations: Bangladesh Awami League (1991 – 2009)
- Spouse: Meher Nigar
- Children: Niloy Manna • Nilom Manna
- Parent(s): Afsar Uddin Ahmed (father); Meher Akhter (mother)
- Education: Dhaka College; Chittagong University; Dhaka University
- Occupation: Writer, Politician

Mahmudur Rahman Manna (Bengali: মাহমুদুর রহমান মান্না) is a Bangladeshi politician and a media personality. He was former organizing secretary of the previously ruling party Bangladesh Awami League. The Wall Street Journal described him as a "fierce critic of the government".

== Biography ==
Manna was born to Afsar Uddin Ahmed and Meher Akhter in Bogra district.

He is married to Meher Nigar.

He was former vice president of Dhaka University Central Students' Union (DUCSU) and former general secretary of Chittagong University Central Student Union (CUCSU).

He is the co-founding convener of Nagorik Oikko, a civil society platform of Bangladesh.

He was arrested by the Rapid Action Battalion on 25 February 2015, after a leaked conversation with Bangladesh Nationalist Party (BNP) leader Sadeque Hossain Khoka, on which he called for a stronger movement against the Bangladesh Awami League government. In the conversation he advised Khoka to seize Dhaka University dormitories. He talked with another unidentified person who suggested contacting Bangladesh Army officers to make a change in the government. The National Human Rights Commission of Bangladesh had called for his arrest. One the other hand, Nagorik Oikko demanded his immediate release. Former Prime Minister Khaleda Zia also demanded his release. Manna was released on bail in November 2016.
