= Md. Ismail Zabihullah =

Bangladeshi retired bureaucrat and politician

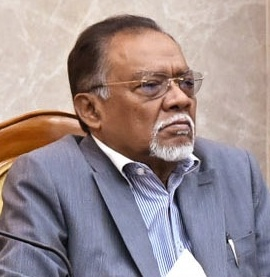
- Ismail in 2026

Adviser to the Prime Minister of Bangladesh
- Incumbent
- Assumed office 17 February 2026
- Prime Minister: Tarique Rahman

Personal details
- Born: 1950 (age 75–76) Lakshmipur District
- Party: Bangladesh Nationalist Party
- Education: University of Dhaka

Md. Ismail Zabihullah (born 1950) is a Bangladeshi retired civil bureaucrat and political adviser. He currently serves as an adviser to Tarique Rahman, Prime Minister of Bangladesh, holding the rank of minister in the government. He has been given charge of the Ministry of Public Administration as part of his advisory responsibilities.He is the member of standing committee member of Bangladesh Nationalist Party (BNP), the party's highest policymaking body.

== Birth & education ==
He was born in 1950 in present-day Lakshmipur District (then part of Noakhali District). His father was Sujauddin Ahmed. He was third child of his parents. In 1965, he ranked 12th in merit list in the Secondary School Certificate (SSC) examination under the Comilla Board. In 1967, he ranked third in Higher Secondary Certificate (HSC) examination under the same board. He obtained a BA (Honours) degree in English literature from University of Dhaka in 1970 and a master's degree in 1973. Later, he obtained an LLB degree from University of Dhaka.

== Career ==
Zabiullah began his career in 1973 as a lecturer in Department of English at Chaumuhani College. At the same time, he taught part-time at Chandraganj Kafiluddin College. He later served as a lecturer in English at Noakhali Government College until 1976.

Alongside teaching, he passed first regular civil service examination held in Bangladesh after independence in 1973. In 1977, he joined administration as an Assistant Commissioner (Magistrate) and began his administrative career in Chittagong.

He held several important positions in the administration and judiciary. He served as a Metropolitan Magistrate of Dhaka, a magistrate of a special tribunal and a judge of a martial law court.

He also served at different times as private secretary to Minister of Communications, Minister of Home Affairs, Minister of Local Government and Minister of Health.

In 1986, he served as Upazila Nirbahi Officer (UNO) of Bhuapur, Tangail and in 2002 as Deputy Commissioner (DC) of Faridpur. He later served as Deputy Secretary of Ministry of Education, Joint Secretary of Election Commission and additional secretary of Economic Relations Division (ERD) of Ministry of Finance. He also served as the Project Director of the PROMOTE project, which was supported by European Union. He was Chairman of IDCOL and IIFC from 2005 to 2006.

As a secretary, he served in Ministry of Communications, Office of the President, Economic Relations Division of the Ministry of Finance and the Ministry of Shipping. He retired from government service in 2008 after a long career.

He remains Adviser at IBAIS University since 2011. In February 2026, portfolios were assigned to advisers in Prime Minister Tarique Rahman's government, with Zabihullah given charge of Public Administration.

== Political activities ==
He is a member of the BNP Chairperson's Advisory Council. He is also a member of the board of trustees at Eastern University. On August 15, 2026, he became a member of the National Standing Committee, the highest policy-making forum of Bangladesh Nationalist Party (BNP).
