= List of heads of government of Bangladesh =

List of head of government post holders of Bangladesh

Jump to list

This is a list of the persons who have exercised the powers and authority of and functioned as the head of government in Bangladesh.

Under the constitutional framework established after 1991, the Prime Minister of Bangladesh serves as the executive head of government. However effective control of the government has at various times been exercised by other offices. These have included the President, the extra-constitutional office of Chief Martial Law Administrator (CMLA), the constitutional position of Chief Adviser of a caretaker or interim government, as well as various de facto leaders who exercised authority without formally holding the office of head of government.

== Prime minister ==
The Prime Minister of Bangladesh is the constitutional head of government under the country’s parliamentary system. The 1972 Constitution established a Westminster-style system in which the prime minister, as leader of the majority in the Jatiya Sangsad (National Parliament), directs the executive branch. The officeholder is appointed by the president but must retain the confidence of parliament to remain in office.

From 12 January 1972 to 25 January 1975 for 3 years and 13 days, the prime minister was the head of government under the original parliamentary framework of the Constitution. Following the shift to a presidential system in 1975 and subsequent military regimes.

The Twelfth Amendment of 1991 restored parliamentary democracy after years of presidential and military dominance, reaffirming the prime minister as the central executive authority. Since 20 March 1991, the prime minister has been the head of government, except during periods when Chief Advisers of caretaker or interim administrations have temporarily assumed executive authority.

This post as head of government was held by Sheikh Mujibur Rahman during 1st parliamentary republic and by Khaleda Zia and Sheikh Hasina during 2nd parliamentary republic.

== President ==
The President of Bangladesh is the ceremonial head of state since 20 March 1991 under the current parliamentary system. From 25 January 1975 to 20 March 1991, the country functioned under a presidential system in which the president was the executive head of government. The Provisional Government of Bangladesh (17 April 1971–12 January 1972) had also followed a presidential framework.

During martial law, the office of Chief Martial Law Administrator (CMLA) often overlapped with the presidency, with the same individual holding both posts. In times when the two offices were separated, the CMLA generally exercised predominant authority. In Ziaur Rahman’s tenure as CMLA, his proclamations did not clearly delineate the division of powers between the president and the CMLA and did not specify who was the head of government but the CMLA exercised de facto authority. During Hussain Muhammad Ershad's assumption of power, the proclamation of martial law on 24 March 1982 explicitly stated that the president could not exercise any authority “without the advice or approval of the CMLA,” and that the CMLA would function as “the Chief Executive and head of the Government” until the withdrawal of martial law.

This post was held as head of government by Sheikh Mujibur Rahman (provisional and republic), Khondaker Mostaq Ahmad (under martial law), Abu Sadat Mohammad Sayem (also CMLA during a part of his tenure before being de jure head of government), Ziaur Rahman (also CMLA before being elected), Abdus Sattar (acting before being elected) and Hussain Muhammad Ershad (also CMLA before and partially after being elected). Syed Nazrul Islam was acting president in 1971 during Mujib's Incarceration in Pakistan and Shahabuddin Ahmed after resignation of Ershad.

== Chief martial law administrator ==
The chief martial law administrator (CMLA) was the principal executive authority during periods of extra-constitutional martial law in Bangladesh. The office frequently overlapped with the presidency sometimes held by the same person and, when separate, the CMLA typically exercised the dominant, de facto executive power.

Under Major General Ziaur Rahman (late 1970s) martial-law proclamations concentrated authority in the martial-law apparatus without clearly distinguishing the powers of the president and the CMLA, leaving the CMLA as the effective head of government. When Lieutenant General Hussain Muhammad Ershad seized power on 24 March 1982 he expressly assumed the title of CMLA and declared that the president could not act “without the advice or approval of the CMLA,” naming the CMLA “Chief Executive and head of the Government” until martial law was withdrawn.

This post was held as in fact or de facto head of government by Abu Sadat Mohammad Sayem (also president), Ziaur Rahman (during Sayem's and his presidency) and Hussain Muhammad Ershad (during Ahsanuddin's and his presidency).

== Chief adviser ==
The Chief Adviser of Bangladesh is the head of government during non-party caretaker and interim governments of Bangladesh. Functioning with powers comparable to those of an elected prime minister, the chief adviser leads a council of advisers who are intended to be politically neutral and acceptable to all major parties.

The office was created in 1996 by the Thirteenth Amendment to the Constitution, following controversy over election credibility. During the 2006–08 political crisis, when President Iajuddin Ahmed assumed the role before being replaced by Fakhruddin Ahmed, who led a military-backed non-neutral caretaker administration. The caretaker system was abolished by the Fifteenth Amendment in 2011 after the Supreme Court declared it unconstitutional. However, the office was restored in December 2024 through a High Court ruling and the resignation of Prime Minister Sheikh Hasina, which paved the way for a new interim government.

By constitutional design, the chief adviser is usually chosen from among the most recently retired Chief Justice of Bangladesh or among retired Appellate Division judges or, ultimately, other non-partisan citizens. Advisers, appointed by the president on the advice of the chief adviser, held the rank and privileges of cabinet ministers, while the chief adviser held the status of prime minister.

This post was held as head of government by Muhammad Habibur Rahman, Latifur Rahman, Iajuddin Ahmed (while serving as president) and military backed non-neutral Fakhruddin Ahmed as chief advisor of caretaker government. Fazlul Haque served as acting chief advisor of caretaker government after Iajuddin Ahmed's resignation. This post is currently held by Muhammad Yunus as chief advisor of the interim government as the head of government of Bangladesh.

== De facto leader ==
At times in Bangladesh’s history, individuals have exercised effective control over the state without formally holding the office of head of government. These de-facto leaders typically emerge during periods of political crisis or military intervention, when command over the armed forces and security institutions enables them to dominate governance.

Army Chief Lt. Gen Moeen Uddin Ahmed staged a military coup on 11 January 2007 during 2006–2008 Bangladesh political crisis. The military-backed caretaker government was formed outside the constitutional provisions. Fakhruddin Ahmed was made head of government. President Iajuddin Ahmed had to run the presidency at gun point during said army rule. Moeen extended the rule of the caretaker government for two years and his tenure as army chief for one year. Moeen’s influence shaped the caretaker government’s decisions, including the declaration of the state of emergency, key appointments, and oversight of political reforms. His role effectively made him the de-facto head of government during this period.

General Waker-uz-Zaman assumed practical control during the brief transition following Prime Minister Sheikh Hasina’s resignation on 5 August 2024, until the installation of the interim government on 8 August 2024. Waker’s coordination of the security apparatus and administrative functions positioned him as the de-facto leader during this brief 3 day transition.

== List ==
Legend

Acting Governor
Chief Martial Law Administrator
de facto leader

Political parties

Awami League (AL)/ Bangladesh Krishak Sramik Awami League (BaKSAL)
Bangladesh Nationalist Party (BNP)
Jatiya Party (JP(E))

Other affiliations

Independent/ Neutral
Military

^{†} Died in office

List of heads of government of Bangladesh
#	Portrait	Head of Government	Rank	Government type	_{Election}	Party	Term start	Term end	Term length	Ministry
1		Sheikh Mujibur Rahman (1920–1975) (Note: Incarcerated in Pakistan till 8 January 1972.)	President	Provisional	1970	AL	17 April 1971	12 January 1972	270 days	Mujib I/Tajuddin
1		Syed Nazrul Islam (1925–1975) (Note: Acting in the absence of Sheikh Mujibur Rahman.)	Acting president	Provisional	1970	AL	17 April 1971	12 January 1972	270 days	Mujib I/Tajuddin
1		Tajuddin Ahmad (1925–1975)	Prime Minister	Provisional	1970	AL	17 April 1971	12 January 1972	270 days	Mujib I/Tajuddin
(1)		Sheikh Mujibur Rahman (1920–1975)	Prime Minister	Parliamentary	1973	AL	12 January 1972	25 January 1975	3 years, 13 days	Mujib II Mujib III
(1)		Sheikh Mujibur Rahman (1920–1975)	President	Presidential under one party	—	BaKSAL	25 January 1975	15 August 1975^{†} (Assassinated in coup)	202 days	Mujib IV
2		Khondaker Mostaq Ahmad (1918–1996)	President	Presidential (Martial law (Note: Immediately after Sheikh Mujibur Rahman’s assassination, Major Dalim announced over Radio Bangladesh that Martial Law had been declared and that Khandaker Mostaq Ahmad was President. This was the first declaration of Martial Law in Bangladesh. However, it was more of a coup proclamation than a formally structured martial law order. Courts, Parliament, and the Constitution were not abolished.))	—	AL (military backed)	15 August 1975	6 November 1975 (Deposed in coup)	83 days	Mostaq
3		Abu Sadat Mohammad Sayem (1916–1997) (Note: Also Chief Martial Law Administrator (24 August 1975 – 4 November 1975 and 7 November 1975 – 29 November 1976).)	CMLA	Presidential (Martial law)	—	Neutral (military backed)	6 November 1975	29 November 1976	1 year, 23 days	Sayem
3		Abu Sadat Mohammad Sayem (1916–1997)	President	Presidential (Martial law)	—	Neutral (military backed)	6 November 1975	21 April 1977	1 year, 166 days	Sayem
4		Ziaur Rahman (1936–1981) (Note: Also Chief Martial Law Administrator (29 November 1976 – 6 April 1979).)	CMLA	Presidential (Martial law)	—	Military	29 November 1976	6 April 1979	2 years, 128 days	Zia
4		Ziaur Rahman (1936–1981)	President	Provisional (Martial law)	—	Military	21 April 1977	12 June 1978	4 years, 39 days	Zia*
4		Ziaur Rahman (1936–1981)	President	Presidential (Martial law)	1977 (Note: Referendum.)	Military	12 June 1978	6 April 1979	4 years, 39 days	Zia
4		Ziaur Rahman (1936–1981)	President	Presidential	1978 (Note: Direct election.)	BNP	6 April 1979	30 May 1981^{†} (Assassinated)	4 years, 39 days	Zia
5		Abdus Sattar (1906–1985)	Acting president	Presidential	—	BNP	30 May 1981	20 November 1981	174 days	Zia
5		Abdus Sattar (1906–1985)	President	Presidential	1981	BNP	20 November 1981	24 March 1982 (Deposed in coup)	124 days	Sattar
6		Hussain Muhammad Ershad (1930–2019) (Note: Served as Chief Martial Law Administrator until 30 March 1984.)	CMLA (Note: By the proclamation of Martial Law by Hussain Muhammad Ershad in 24 March 1982, President of the head of state and CMLA was the head of government declaring "the President would not exercise any power… without the advice or approval of the CMLA" & "The Chief Martial Law Administrator shall be the Chief Executive and head of the Government")	Presidential (Martial law)	—	Military	24 March 1982	11 November 1986	4 years, 232 days	Ershad
6		Hussain Muhammad Ershad (1930–2019)	President	Presidential (Martial law)	1985	Military	11 December 1983	15 October 1986	6 years, 360 days	Ershad
6		Hussain Muhammad Ershad (1930–2019)	President	Presidential (Martial law)	1986	JP	15 October 1986	11 November 1986	6 years, 360 days	Ershad
6		Hussain Muhammad Ershad (1930–2019)	President	Presidential	1986	JP	11 November 1986	6 December 1990 (Forced to resign)	6 years, 360 days	Ershad
7		Shahabuddin Ahmed (1930–2022)	Acting president	Caretaker	—	Neutral	6 December 1990	20 March 1991	104 days	Shahabuddin
8		Khaleda Zia (1946–2025)	Prime Minister	Parliamentary	1991 1996 (Feb)	BNP	20 March 1991	30 March 1996	5 years, 10 days	Khaleda I Khaleda II
9		Muhammad Habibur Rahman (1928–2014)	Chief Adviser	Caretaker	—	Neutral	30 March 1996	23 June 1996	85 days	Habibur Rahman
10		Sheikh Hasina (born 1947)	Prime Minister	Parliamentary	1996 (Jun)	AL	23 June 1996	15 July 2001	5 years, 33 days	Hasina I
11		Latifur Rahman (1936–2017)	Chief Adviser	Caretaker	—	Neutral	15 July 2001	10 October 2001	87 days	Latifur Rahman
12		Khaleda Zia (1946–2025)	Prime Minister	Parliamentary	2001	BNP	10 October 2001	29 October 2006	5 years, 19 days	Khaleda III
13		Iajuddin Ahmed (1931–2012) (Note: Simultaneously served as President.)	Chief Adviser	Caretaker	—	Neutral	29 October 2006	11 January 2007	74 days	Iajuddin
-		Fazlul Haque (1938–2023)	Acting Chief Adviser	Caretaker	—	Neutral	11 January 2007	12 January 2007	1 day	Iajuddin
14		Fakhruddin Ahmed (born 1940)	Chief Adviser (de jure Head of Government)	Caretaker (military backed)	—	12 January 2007	6 January 2009	1 year, 360 days	Fakhruddin	Neutral (military backed)
15		Sheikh Hasina (born 1947)	Prime Minister	Parliamentary	2008 2014 2018 2024	AL	6 January 2009	5 August 2024 (Note: Resigned and fled to India in the aftermath of the July Uprising.)	15 years, 212 days	Hasina II Hasina III Hasina IV Hasina V
-		Waker-Uz-Zaman (born 1966	de facto Head of Government	de facto	—	Military	5 August 2024	8 August 2024	3 days	—
16		Muhammad Yunus (born 1940)	Chief Adviser	Interim	—	Neutral	8 August 2024	17 February 2026	2 years, 105 days	Yunus
17		Tarique Rahman (born 1965)	Prime Minister	Parliamentary	2026	BNP	17 February 2026	Incumbent	277 days	Tarique
