= List of People's Republic of Bangladesh governments =

List of governments of Bangladesh

This is a list of successive governments of the People's Republic of Bangladesh from the time of the establishment of the Provisional Government of Bangladesh on 10 April 1971.

== List ==
Government	Term	President	Prime Minister	Cabinet	Government type	Party	Election	Parliamentary strength	Formation
Provisional government	1971–1972	Sheikh Mujibur Rahman Syed Nazrul Islam (acting)	Tajuddin Ahmed	Mujib I	Provisional	AL	None	—	Formed by the exiled AL leaders.
Constituent assembly	1972–1973	Abu Sayeed Chowdhury	Sheikh Mujibur Rahman	Mujib II	Provisional	AL	1970	400/403	Formed by all pro-independence elected MPs and MLAs of East Pakistan.
First Jatiya sangsad	1973-1973	Abu Sayeed Chowdhury	Sheikh Mujibur Rahman	Mujib III	Parliamentary	AL	1973	308/315	First election of Bangladesh was held on 1973, opposition had almost no presence in the parliament.
First Jatiya sangsad	1973–1975	Mohammad Mohammadullah	Sheikh Mujibur Rahman	Mujib III	Parliamentary	AL	1973	308/315	First election of Bangladesh was held on 1973, opposition had almost no presence in the parliament.
One Party rule	1975-1975	Sheikh Mujibur Rahman	Muhammad Mansur Ali	Mujib IV	Presidential	BaKSAL	None	—	Fourth Amendment made BaKSAL the sole legal party and AL disbanded by Mujib.
First Martial law	1975-1975	Khondaker Mostaq Ahmad	Post abolished	Mostaq	Presidential	AL military backed	None	—	Mujib assassinated in a military coup and Mostaq was made the president.
First Martial law	1975–1977	Abu Sadat Mohammad Sayem	Post abolished	Sayem	Presidential	AL military backed	None	—	Mostaq deposed by military coup Sayem was made the president.
First Martial law	1977–1978	Ziaur Rahman	Post abolished	Military junta	Presidential	Military	1977	—	CMLA Zia took charge of the president after confidence referandum on this policy.
First Martial law	1978-1979	Ziaur Rahman	Mashiur Rahman	Zia (Provisional)	Presidential	JaGoDal/ BNP	1978	—	Zia won the first direct presidential election.
Second Jatiya sangsad	1979–1982	Ziaur Rahman	Shah Azizur Rahman	Zia (Elected)	Presidential	BNP	1979	237/330	Martial law was lifted on 9 April 1979 and all political activities were allowed.
Second Jatiya sangsad	1981-1982	Abdus Sattar	Shah Azizur Rahman	Sattar	Presidential	BNP	1979	237/330	Satter took charge after the Assassination of Ziaur Rahman
Second Martial law	1982–1983	A. F. M. Ahsanuddin Chowdhury	Post abolished	Military junta	Presidential	Independent military backed	None	—	Sattar deposed by military coup.
Second Martial law	1983-1984	Hossain Mohammad Ershad	Post abolished	Military junta	Presidential	Military	None	—	CMLA Ershad declare himself the president.
Second Martial law	1984–1985	Hossain Mohammad Ershad	Ataur Rahman Khan	Ershad	Presidential	JaNaDal	1985	—	Ershad gave him legitimacy by holding confidence referendum.
Third Jatiya sangsad	1986-1988	Hossain Mohammad Ershad	Mizanur Rahman Chowdhury	Ershad	Presidential	JP-E	1986	183/330	Only AL and Jamaat took part among the major opposition parties, opposition claimed media coup and election fraud.
Fourth Jatiya sangsad	1988-1989	Hossain Mohammad Ershad	Moudud Ahmed	Ershad	Presidential	JP-E	1988	251/300	All major parties boycotted 1988 election and demanded Ershad's resignation.
Fourth Jatiya sangsad	1989-1990	Hossain Mohammad Ershad	Kazi Zafar Ahmed	Ershad	Presidential	JP-E	1988	251/300	All major parties boycotted 1988 election and demanded Ershad's resignation.
First Interim government	1990-1991	Shahabuddin Ahmed (acting)	vacant	Shahabuddin	Interim	Impartial	None	—	Formed by political consensus of 3 alliances after Ershad was ousted by 1990 mass uprising
Fifth Jatiya sangsad	1991-1996	Abdur Rahman Biswas	Khaleda Zia	Khaleda I	Parliamentary	BNP with outside support of Jamaat	1991	168/330	Considered as the first free, fair and inclusive election.
Sixth Jatiya sangsad	1996	Abdur Rahman Biswas	Khaleda Zia	Khaleda II	Parliamentary	BNP	1996	308/330	All major party boycotted the election, BNP won unopposed.
First Caretaker government	1996-1996	Abdur Rahman Biswas	CA Muhammad Habibur Rahman	Habib	Caretaker	Independent	None	—	Khaleda resigned because of opposition demand and handed over power to impartial caretaker government for the conduct of free and fair election.
Seventh Jatiya sangsad	1996-1996	Abdur Rahman Biswas	Sheikh Hasina	Hasina I	Parliamentary	AL	1996	211/330	Hasina became PM after most close contested election in the history of Bangladesh.
Seventh Jatiya sangsad	1996-2001	Shahabuddin Ahmed	Sheikh Hasina	Hasina I	Parliamentary	JP-E	1996	211/330	Hasina became PM after most close contested election in the history of Bangladesh.
Seventh Jatiya sangsad	1996-2001	Shahabuddin Ahmed	Sheikh Hasina	Hasina I	Parliamentary	JaSaD	1996	211/330	Hasina became PM after most close contested election in the history of Bangladesh.
Second Caretaker government	2001-2001	Shahabuddin Ahmed	CA Latifur Rahman	Latif	Caretaker	Independent	None	—	Hasina peacefully handed over power to the neutral caretaker government for conduct of election.
Eighth Jatiya Sangsad	2001-2001	Shahabuddin Ahmed	Khaleda Zia	Khaleda III	Parliamentary	BNP	2001	210/300	BNP got majority and formed government.
Eighth Jatiya Sangsad	2001-2002	Badruddoza Chowdhury	Khaleda Zia	Khaleda III	Parliamentary	BNP	2001	210/300	BNP got majority and formed government.
Eighth Jatiya Sangsad	2002-2002	Muhammad Jamiruddin Sircar (acting)	Khaleda Zia	Khaleda III	Parliamentary	Jamaat	2001	210/300	BNP got majority and formed government.
Eighth Jatiya Sangsad	2002-2006	Iajuddin Ahmed	Khaleda Zia	Khaleda III	Parliamentary	Jamaat	2001	210/300	BNP got majority and formed government.
Third Caretaker government	2006-2007	Iajuddin Ahmed	CA Iajuddin Ahmed	Iajuddin	Caretaker	Independent	None	—	Extension of age of retirement of the CJB caused political tension and resulted in 1-11 political crisis. President declared himself as the CA without exploring other options.
Third Caretaker government	2007-2007	Iajuddin Ahmed	CA Fazlul Haque (acting)	None	Caretaker	Independent	None	—	State of emergency declared Iajuddin resigned as CA but continued as president.
Third Caretaker government	2007-2009	Iajuddin Ahmed	CA Fakhruddin Ahmed	Fakhruddin	Caretaker	Independent military backed	None	—	Formed as a result of direct military intervention.
Ninth Jatiya sangsad	2009-2009	Iajuddin Ahmed	Sheikh Hasina	Hasina II	Parliamentary	AL	2008	302/350	Opposition accused election commission of Gerrymandering in favor of Awami League in almost 100 constituencies.
Ninth Jatiya sangsad	2009-2013	Zillur Rahman	Sheikh Hasina	Hasina II	Parliamentary	JP-E	2008	302/350	Opposition accused election commission of Gerrymandering in favor of Awami League in almost 100 constituencies.
Ninth Jatiya sangsad	2013-2014	Mohammad Abdul Hamid	Sheikh Hasina	Hasina II	Parliamentary	JaSaD	2008	302/350	Opposition accused election commission of Gerrymandering in favor of Awami League in almost 100 constituencies.
Tenth Jatiya sangsad	2014-2018	Mohammad Abdul Hamid	Sheikh Hasina	Hasina III	Parliamentary	AL	2014	328/350	Fifteenth Amendment was brought to abolish Caretaker government despite opposition from other parties. All opposition boycotted the election. 154 out of 300 MPs got elected unopposed.
Tenth Jatiya sangsad	2014-2018	Mohammad Abdul Hamid	Sheikh Hasina	Hasina III	Parliamentary	JP-E	2014	328/350	Fifteenth Amendment was brought to abolish Caretaker government despite opposition from other parties. All opposition boycotted the election. 154 out of 300 MPs got elected unopposed.
Tenth Jatiya sangsad	2014-2018	Mohammad Abdul Hamid	Sheikh Hasina	Hasina III	Parliamentary	JaSaD	2014	328/350	Fifteenth Amendment was brought to abolish Caretaker government despite opposition from other parties. All opposition boycotted the election. 154 out of 300 MPs got elected unopposed.
Tenth Jatiya sangsad	2014-2018	Mohammad Abdul Hamid	Sheikh Hasina	Hasina III	Parliamentary	WPB	2014	328/350	Fifteenth Amendment was brought to abolish Caretaker government despite opposition from other parties. All opposition boycotted the election. 154 out of 300 MPs got elected unopposed.
Tenth Jatiya sangsad	2014-2018	Mohammad Abdul Hamid	Sheikh Hasina	Hasina III	Parliamentary	JP-M	2014	328/350	Fifteenth Amendment was brought to abolish Caretaker government despite opposition from other parties. All opposition boycotted the election. 154 out of 300 MPs got elected unopposed.
Eleventh Jatiya sangsad	2018-2023	Mohammad Abdul Hamid	Sheikh Hasina	Hasina IV	Parliamentary	AL	2018	300/350	Opposition and independent news sources claimed the election to be rigged.
Eleventh Jatiya sangsad	2023-2024	Mohammed Shahabuddin	Sheikh Hasina	Hasina IV	Parliamentary	AL	2018	300/350	Opposition and independent news sources claimed the election to be rigged.
Twelfth Jatiya sangsad	2024-2024	Mohammed Shahabuddin	Sheikh Hasina	Hasina V	Parliamentary	AL	2024	271/350	Only the members of Grand Alliance took part in the election. The country turned into de facto one-party state.
There was no Government from 5 August 2024 to 8 August 2024
Second Interim government	2024-2026	Mohammed Shahabuddin	CA Muhammad Yunus	Yunus	Interim	Impartial	None	—	Formed based on political consensus of all parties except AL after Hasina was ousted by July Uprising.
Thirteenth Jatiya sangsad	2026-2026	Mohammed Shahabuddin	Tarique Rahman	Tarique	Parliamentary	BNP	2026	212/300	BNP secured two-third seats in the parliament in its landslide victory in the general election.
Thirteenth Jatiya sangsad	2026-2026	Hafiz Uddin Ahmad (acting)	Tarique Rahman	Tarique	Parliamentary	GOP	2026	212/300	BNP secured two-third seats in the parliament in its landslide victory in the general election.
Thirteenth Jatiya sangsad	2026-	Mirza Fakhrul Islam Alamgir	Tarique Rahman	Tarique	Parliamentary	GSA	2026	212/300	BNP secured two-third seats in the parliament in its landslide victory in the general election.
Thirteenth Jatiya sangsad	2026-	Mirza Fakhrul Islam Alamgir	Tarique Rahman	Tarique	Parliamentary	BJP	2026	212/300	BNP secured two-third seats in the parliament in its landslide victory in the general election.
Thirteenth Jatiya sangsad	2026-	Mirza Fakhrul Islam Alamgir	Tarique Rahman	Tarique	Parliamentary	Independents	2026	212/300	BNP secured two-third seats in the parliament in its landslide victory in the general election.
