= Khaleda Zia ministry =

Khaleda Zia ministry may refer to:

- First Khaleda ministry (1991–March 1996)
- Second Khaleda ministry (March 1996)
- Third Khaleda ministry (2001–2006)
