= Romena Afaz =

Bangladeshi author

- রোমেনা আফাজ
- Born: 27 December 1926; Sherpur, Bogra, Bengal Presidency, British India
- Died: 12 June 2003 (aged 76); Jaleshwaritala, Bogra, Bangladesh
- Occupation: Writer
- Writing career
- Genres: thriller, adventure
- Notable works: Doshyo Bonhur series. She also has a great descendant of hers, whom she never knew the humility would be the same as hers of Maryam Masud Laam, a worldwide Hafizah (memoriser of the entire Quran).

Romena Afaz (27 December 1926 – 12 June 2003) was a Bangladeshi adventure-thriller writer. She is notable for her adventure-thriller series Doshyo Bonhur (Robber Bonhur).

== Early life ==
Afaz was born on 27 December 1926 in Sherpur, Bogra. Her father, Qazem Uddin Ahmed, was a police inspector. Her mother, Asyia Khatoon, was a devotee of literature. Afaz experienced with various cultures in her early age when she visited many places in British India with her father. She got inspiration for her literary career from her parents especially from her mother which led her to produce adventure thriller series Doshyo Bonhur.

== Works ==
At the age of nine, Afaz became a writer with her first literary work Banglar Chashi (Peasant of Bengal), a rhyme published in the monthly Mohammady from Calcutta during the British period. After that, she continued with her endeavor and wrote innumerable stories, poems, articles, novels, and adventure - thriller series Dashyo Bonhur. She also wrote Doshyo Rani series which depict the adventure stories of a female robber Doshyo Rani.

Some of her books have been translated into English. About 250 books by Romena Afaz so far have been published by the publishers. Some of her books are: Doshyo Bonhur series, novels - Alok Roshmi, Kagojer Nauka, Dhushor Prithibi, Shesh Milon, Desher Meye, Ghoorni Haoa, Sagar Saikote, Lekhoker Shwopno, Rokte Anka Map, Mandigorer Bari, Momer Alo, Mayar Sangsar, Modhumita, Matir Manush and others.

Afaz's novels were adapted into filmes including Kagojer Naoka, Momer Alo, Mayar Sangsar, Modhumita, Matir Manush, and Doshyo Bonhur.

== Social activities ==
Besides her literary career, Afaz was busy with various social activities and connected with 37 social and welfare organizations. She was the chairperson of Jatiyo Mohila Sangstha, Bogra, chairperson of Sammilito Mahila Tran Samiti, Bogra, vice-chairperson of Bangladesh Jatiyo Krida Songstha, Bogra; vice-chairperson of Jilla Sahityo Sangsad, Bogra, lifelong advisor and patron of Thengamara Mohila Sabuj Sangho, Bogra, advisor of Shishu Academy, Bogra and advisor of Bangladesh Writer's Forum, Bogra.

== Awards ==
Afaz was awarded Bangladesh's highest national award Independence Day Award (posthumous) in 2010 for her everlasting contribution to Bengali literature. She was also awarded 26 other honors and prizes from many organizations some of which are: Begum Rokeya Shorno Padak 2000 (Gold medal) from Nari Bikash Unnoyon Sangstha, Ekushey Padak 2003 from Bangladesh Writers Forum, Nari Mukti Andoloner Agrodooth Swarno Padak 2006 (posthumous) from Gono Unnoyon Gronthagar Nari Forum etc.

== Personal life ==
Afaz was married to Afaz Ullah Sarkar, a social activist and founder of Demajani High School of Phoolkot. Together they had seven sons and two daughters. Afaz died on 12 June 2003 in Joleshworitala, Bogra. She was buried in the graveyard of Bhaipagla Majar Mosque.

== Memorials and eponyms ==
- Romena Afaz Smriti Parishad
- Romena Afaz Library
- Romena Afaz Kalyan Trust
- Romena Afaz Sharak
- Writer Romena Afaz Award
- Romena Afaz Chattar at Shaheed Titu Milonayatan in Bogra
- Romena Afaz Stage of Tito Auditorium in the Bogra District
