= National Trauma Counselling Centre =

Research institute in Bangladesh

- Formation: August 10, 2009
- Headquarters: 37/3 Eskaton Garden Road, Dhaka-1000, Bangladesh
- Region served: Bangladesh
- Official language: Bengali
- Website: ntcc-mowca.gov.bd

National Trauma Counselling Centre is a Bangladesh government owned specialized health centre that provides counselling and support to victims of domestic violence.

== History ==
National Trauma Counselling Centre was established in August 2009 under the Ministry of Women and Children Affairs. It conducts research on counselling victims of domestic violence.
