= Joyeeta Foundation =

Non-profit Organisation in Bangladesh

- Formation: 2011
- Headquarters: Dhaka, Bangladesh
- Location: Concord Royal Court, 275/G, Road No 27 (old), Dhanmondi R/A, Dhaka- 1209
- Region served: Bangladesh
- Official language: Bengali
- Parent organization: Ministry of Women and Children Affairs, Bangladesh
- Website: Joyeeta Foundation

Joyeeta Foundation (Bengali: জয়িতা ফাউন্ডেশন) is a Bangladesh government foundation under the Ministry of Women and Children Affairs that provides financing and support to women entrepreneurs.

== History ==
Joyeeta Foundation was established in November 2011 under the Societies Registration Act, XXI of 1860. It provides a low interest loans to women entrepreneurs.
