= Department of Women Affairs =

Bangladeshi government department

- Formation: 1972
- Headquarters: Dhaka, Bangladesh
- Region served: Bangladesh
- Official language: Bengali
- Website: www.dwa.gov.bd

Department of Women Affairs is a government department responsible for the welfare of women in Bangladesh and is located in Dhaka, Bangladesh. The department is head by Director General Parveen Akhter.

== History ==
The government of Bangladesh founded the Department of Women Affairs on 18 February 1972. The department is under the Ministry of Women and Children Affairs. The center founded a national helpline to prevent violence against women. National Trauma Counselling Centre is located at the headquarters of the building. The department runs 43 day care centres throughout Bangladesh.
