= Second Zia ministry =

13th Council of Ministers of Bangladesh

- Government of Bangladesh
- 19 March 1996 – 30 March 1996
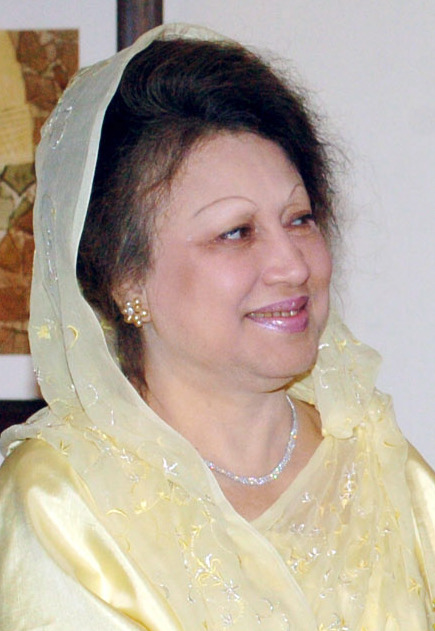
- Khaleda Zia in 2006
- Date formed: 19 March 1996
- Date dissolved: 30 March 1996

People and organisations
- President: Shahabuddin Ahmed
- Prime Minister: Khaleda Zia
- Total no. of members: 27
- Member party: Bangladesh Nationalist Party
- Status in legislature: Majority
- Opposition party: None

History
- Election: February 1996 general election
- Outgoing election: June 1996 general election
- Legislature term: 1996
- Predecessor: First Khaleda ministry
- Successor: Habibur Rahman ministry

The second Khaleda ministry was the government of Bangladesh during the 6th legislative sessions of the Jatiya Sangsad (Parliament) following the February 1996 general election, boycotted by most of the opposition parties. The cabinet took oath in a hurry on 19 March 1996 amid hartals and protests from the opposition parties for a new election under a caretaker government.

The cabinet passed the Constitutional Amendment Bill in the sitting parliament to establish a neutral caretaker government system in Bangladesh. The second Khaleda ministry was short-lived; lasting only 12 days, the ministry transferred power to the caretaker government led by Muhammad Habibur Rahman on 30 March 1996 and an election was scheduled for June 1996.

== Ministers ==
=== Cabinet Ministers ===
Portfolio	Name	Took office	Left office	Party
Prime Minister and also in-charge of: Cabinet Division; Ministry of Establishment; Ministry of Defence; Special Affairs Division; Primary and Mass Education Division; All important policy issues; and All other portfolios not allocated to any Minister.	Khaleda Zia	19 March 1996	30 March 1996	BNP
Ministry of Foreign Affairs	A. S. M. Mustafizur Rahman	19 March 1996	30 March 1996	BNP
Ministry of Finance	Saifur Rahman	19 March 1996	30 March 1996	BNP
Ministry of Local Government, Rural Development and Co-operatives	Abdus Salam Talukder	19 March 1996	30 March 1996	BNP
Ministry of Power, Energy and Mineral Resources	Oli Ahmad	19 March 1996	30 March 1996	BNP
Ministry of Health and Family Welfare	Chowdhury Kamal Ibne Yusuf	19 March 1996	30 March 1996	BNP
Ministry of Posts and Telecommunications	Tariqul Islam	19 March 1996	30 March 1996	BNP
Ministry of Communications	Abdul Matin Chowdhury	19 March 1996	30 March 1996	BNP
Ministry of Home Affairs	Khandaker Mosharraf Hossain	19 March 1996	30 March 1996	BNP
Ministry of Education; Ministry of Science and Technology	Rafiqul Islam Miah	19 March 1996	30 March 1996	BNP
Ministry of Agriculture; Ministry of Food; Ministry of Water Resources	Abdul Mannan Bhuiyan	19 March 1996	30 March 1996	BNP
Ministry of Law, Justice and Parliamentary Affairs	Jamiruddin Sircar	19 March 1996	30 March 1996	BNP
Ministry of Fisheries and Livestock; Ministry of Environment and Forest	Abdullah Al Noman	19 March 1996	30 March 1996	BNP
Ministry of Land; Ministry of Housing and Public Works	Mirza Abbas	19 March 1996	30 March 1996	BNP

=== State Ministers (Ministry Charge) ===
Portfolio	Name	Took office	Left office	Party
Ministry of Youth and Sports	Sadeque Hossain Khoka	19 March 1996	30 March 1996	BNP
Minister of Civil Aviation and Tourism	Major (retd.) Abdul Mannan	19 March 1996	30 March 1996	BNP
Ministry of Industries	Lutfor Rahman Khan Azad	19 March 1996	30 March 1996	BNP
Ministry of Cultural Affairs	Jahanara Begum	19 March 1996	30 March 1996	BNP
Ministry of Women and Children Affairs	Sarwari Rahman	19 March 1996	30 March 1996	BNP
Ministry of Disaster Management and Relief; Ministry of Labour and Employment	Haroon Al Rashid	19 March 1996	30 March 1996	BNP
Ministry of Religious Affairs; Ministry of Social Welfare	Fazlur Rahman Potol	19 March 1996	30 March 1996	BNP
Ministry of Information	Aminul Haque	19 March 1996	30 March 1996	BNP
Ministry of Planning	Abdul Moyeen Khan	19 March 1996	30 March 1996	BNP
Ministry of Shipping	Shajahan Siraj	19 March 1996	30 March 1996	BNP
Ministry of Textiles; Ministry of Jute	Redwan Ahmed	19 March 1996	30 March 1996	BNP
Ministry of Commerce	Hafizuddin Ahmed	19 March 1996	30 March 1996	BNP

=== State Ministers ===
Portfolio	Name	Took office	Left office	Party
Ministry of Establishment	Aminul Haque	19 March 1996	30 March 1996	BNP
Ministry of Education; Ministry of Science and Technology	Amanullah Aman	19 March 1996	30 March 1996	BNP
