= Ministry of Women and Children Affairs =

Government ministry of Bangladesh

- নারী ও শিশু বিষয়ক মন্ত্রণালয়
- Government Seal of Bangladesh

Ministry overview
- Formed: 11 December 1978; 47 years ago
- Jurisdiction: Government of Bangladesh
- Headquarters: Bangladesh Secretariat, Dhaka
- Annual budget: ৳5196 crore (US$420 million) (2026-2027)
- Minister responsible: A. Z. M. Zahid Hossain
- Ministry executives: Rowsan Ara Begum, Secretary
- Child agencies: Department of Women Affairs; Jatiya Mohila Songstha; Bangladesh Shishu Academy; Joyeeta Foundation
- Website: mowca.gov.bd

The Ministry of Women and Children Affairs (Bengali: নারী ও শিশু বিষয়ক মন্ত্রণালয়; nɑˈri ō śiśu biṣaẏaka mantraṇālaẏa) is a government ministry of Bangladesh responsible for the formulation of policies that promotes the institutionalization and development of women and children.

Feminist Roushan Jahan wrote in 1995 that the government's "lack of priority accorded to women is reflected in the allocation to the Ministry of Women's Affairs, only 0.3 percent of the total budget".

In December 2025, the interim government of Bangladesh announced a change to the Bengali name of the Ministry of Women and Children Affairs, shifting it from Mahila O Shishu Bishoyok Montronaloy to Nari O Shishu Bishoyok Montronaloy. In 2026, a gazette notification was published regarding this change.

Under this ministry, the Directorate of Women Affairs, Jatiya Mohila Songstha, Joyeeta Foundation, Bangladesh Shishu Academy and the DNA Laboratory Management Directorate, which are responsible for development of women and children as well as overseeing women's empowerment, equality, protection and protection of rights.

== Ministers ==
- ^{†} Died in office

Portrait	Minister (Birth-Death) Constituency	Term of office			Political party	Ministry	Prime Minister
Portrait	Minister (Birth-Death) Constituency	From	To	Period	Political party	Ministry	Prime Minister
	Tariqul Islam তরিকুল ইসলাম (1946–2018); MP for Jessore-3 (State Minister, M/C until 19 Sep 1991)	20 March 1991	14 August 1993	2 years, 147 days	Bangladesh Nationalist Party	Khaleda I	Khaleda Zia
	Sarwari Rahman সারওয়ারী রহমান; MP for Reserved Women's Seat (State Minister, M/C)	14 August 1993	19 March 1996	2 years, 229 days	Bangladesh Nationalist Party	Khaleda I	Khaleda Zia
	Sarwari Rahman সারওয়ারী রহমান; MP for Reserved Women's Seat (State Minister, M/C)	19 March 1996	30 March 1996	2 years, 229 days	Bangladesh Nationalist Party	Khaleda II	Khaleda Zia
	Najma Chowdhury নাজমা চৌধুরী (1942–2021) (Adviser)	31 March 1996	23 June 1996	84 days	Independent	Habibur	Habibur Rahman
	Mozammel Hossain মোজাম্মেল হোসেন (1940–2020); MP for Bagerhat-4 (State Minister, M/C)	23 June 1996	24 December 1998	2 years, 184 days	Awami League	Hasina I	Sheikh Hasina
	Zinnatunnessa Talukdar জিন্নাতুন্নেসা তালুকদার (1947–2023); MP for Reserved Women's Seat-6 (State Minister, M/C)	24 December 1998	15 July 2001	2 years, 203 days	Awami League	Hasina I	Sheikh Hasina
	Rokia Afzal Rahman রোকিয়া আফজাল রহমান (1941–2023) (Adviser)	15 July 2001	10 October 2001	87 days	Independent	Latifur	Latifur Rahman
	Khurshid Jahan খুরশিদ জাহান (1939–2006); MP for Dinajpur-3	11 October 2001	14 June 2006^{[†]}	4 years, 246 days	Bangladesh Nationalist Party	Khaleda III	Khaleda Zia
	Alamgir Kabir আলমগীর কবির (born 1948); MP for Naogaon-6 (State Minister, M/C)	14 June 2006	29 October 2006	137 days	Bangladesh Nationalist Party	Khaleda III	Khaleda Zia
	Yasmeen Murshed ইয়াসমিন মোর্শেদ (1945–2025) (Adviser)	26 October 2006	11 January 2007	77 days	Independent	Iajuddin	Iajuddin Ahmed
	Geetiara Safya Chowdhury গীতিআরা সাফিয়া চৌধুরী (Adviser)	12 January 2007	8 January 2008	361 days	Independent	Fakhruddin	Fakhruddin Ahmed
	Rasheda K Chowdhury রাশেদা কে চৌধূরী (born 1951) (Adviser)	9 January 2008	6 January 2009	363 days	Independent	Fakhruddin	Fakhruddin Ahmed
	Sheikh Hasina শেখ হাসিনা (born 1947); MP for Gopalganj-3 (Prime Minister)	6 January 2009	31 July 2009	206 days	Awami League	Hasina II	Sheikh Hasina
	Shirin Sharmin Chaudhury শিরীন শারমিন চৌধুরী (born 1966); MP for Reserved Women's Seat-31 (State Minister, M/C)	31 July 2009	30 April 2013	3 years, 273 days	Awami League	Hasina II	Sheikh Hasina
	Sheikh Hasina শেখ হাসিনা (born 1947); MP for Gopalganj-3 (Prime Minister)	30 April 2013	2 June 2013	33 days	Awami League	Hasina II	Sheikh Hasina
	Meher Afroz Chumki মেহের আফরোজ চুমকি (born 1959); MP for Gazipur-5 (State Minister, M/C)	2 June 2013	21 November 2013	172 days	Awami League	Hasina II	Sheikh Hasina
	Salma Islam সালমা ইসলাম (born 1955); MP for Reserved Women's Seat-45 (State Minister, M/C)	21 November 2013	12 January 2014	52 days	Jatiya Party (Ershad)	Hasina II	Sheikh Hasina
	Meher Afroz Chumki মেহের আফরোজ চুমকি (born 1959); MP for Gazipur-5 (State Minister, M/C)	12 January 2014	7 January 2019	4 years, 360 days	Awami League	Hasina III	Sheikh Hasina
	Sheikh Hasina শেখ হাসিনা (born 1947); MP for Gopalganj-3 (Prime Minister)	7 January 2019	11 January 2024	5 years, 4 days	Awami League	Hasina IV	Sheikh Hasina
	Simeen Hussain Rimi সিমিন হোসেন রিমি (born 1961); MP for Gazipur-4 (State Minister, M/C)	11 January 2024	6 August 2024	208 days	Awami League	Hasina V	Sheikh Hasina
	Muhammad Yunus মূহাম্মদ ইউনূস (born 1940) (Chief Adviser)	9 August 2024	22 August 2024	13 days	Independent	Yunus	Muhammad Yunus
	Sharmeen Murshid শারমিন মুরশিদ (born 1968) (Adviser)	22 August 2024	17 February 2026	1 year, 179 days	Independent	Yunus	Muhammad Yunus
	A. Z. M. Zahid Hossain এ. জেড. এম. জাহিদ হোসেন (born 1960); MP for Dinajpur-6	17 February 2026	Incumbent	254 days	Bangladesh Nationalist Party	Tarique	Tarique Rahman

== Directorates ==
- Department of Women Affairs
- Jatiya Mohila Songstha
- Bangladesh Shishu Academy
- Joyeeta Foundation
- Directorate of DNA Laboratory Management
