= First Zia ministry =

12th Council of Ministers of Bangladesh

- 12th Council of Ministers of the People’s Republic of Bangladesh
- 20 March 1991 – 19 March 1996
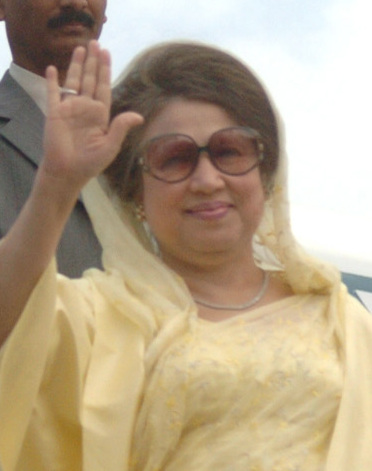
- Khaleda Zia; Hon'ble Prime Minister of Bangladesh
- Date formed: 20 March 1991
- Date dissolved: 19 March 1996

People and organisations
- President: Shahabuddin Ahmed
- Prime Minister: Khaleda Zia
- Total no. of members: 50 (Including the Prime Minister)
- Member party: Bangladesh Nationalist Party
- Status in legislature: Majority
- Opposition party: Bangladesh Awami League
- Opposition leader: Sheikh Hasina

History
- Election: 1991
- Outgoing election: Feb 1996
- Legislature terms: 4 years, 365 days
- Incoming formation: 5th Jatiya Sangsad
- Outgoing formation: 6th Jatiya Sangsad
- Predecessor: Shahabuddin
- Successor: Khaleda II

The First Khaleda ministry was the Government of Bangladesh during the 5th legislative session of the Jatiya Sangsad (Parliament) following the 1991 Bangladeshi general election. It began on 20 March 1991 and but had to be sworn in again on 19 September after the 12th constitutional amendment took effect following a constitutional referendum. In accordance to the amendment, all executive powers were transferred from the president to the prime minister and thus Khaleda Zia became the first female head of government of Bangladesh.

Following the February 1996 general election, boycotted by most of the opposition parties, Khaleda Zia's new ministry was formed on 19 March 1996.

== Ministers ==
=== Cabinet Ministers ===
Portfolio	Name	Took office	Left office	Party	Remarks
Prime Minister and also in-charge of: Ministry of Establishment; Cabinet Division; Ministry of Defence; All important policy issues; and All other portfolios not allocated to any Minister.	Khaleda Zia	20 March 1991	19 March 1996	BNP	
Primary and Mass Education Division	Khaleda Zia	15 August 1992	19 March 1996	BNP	-
Ministry of Information	Khaleda Zia	20 March 1991	19 September 1991	BNP	Prime Minister was responsible.
Ministry of Information	Nazmul Huda	19 September 1991	5 November 1994	BNP	Resigned.
Ministry of Information	Shamsul Islam	5 November 1994	19 March 1996	BNP	
Ministry of Power, Energy and Mineral Resources	Khaleda Zia	20 March 1991	19 September 1991	BNP	Prime Minister was responsible.
Ministry of Power, Energy and Mineral Resources	Khandaker Mosharraf Hossain	19 September 1991	19 March 1996	BNP	
Ministry of Law and Justice	Mirza Ghulam Hafiz	20 March 1991	19 March 1996	BNP	
Ministry of Education	Badruddoza Chowdhury	20 March 1991	19 September 1991	BNP	
Ministry of Education	Jamiruddin Sircar	19 September 1991	19 March 1996	BNP	
Ministry of Cultural Affairs	Badruddoza Chowdhury	27 March 1991	19 September 1991	BNP	
Ministry of Cultural Affairs	Jahanara Begum	19 September 1991	19 March 1996	BNP	State Minister (M/C) was responsible.
Ministry of Agriculture	Majid-ul-Haq	20 March 1991	27 June 1995	BNP	
Ministry of Agriculture	Abdul Mannan Bhuiyan	27 June 1995	19 March 1996	BNP	
Ministry of Irrigation, Water Development and Flood Control	Majid-ul-Haq	20 March 1991	19 March 1996	BNP	
Ministry of Foreign Affairs	A. S. M. Mustafizur Rahman	20 March 1991	19 March 1996	BNP	
Ministry of Finance	Saifur Rahman	20 March 1991	19 March 1996	BNP	
Ministry of Planning	Saifur Rahman	20 March 1991	19 September 1991	BNP	
Ministry of Planning	A. M. Zahiruddin Khan	19 September 1991	12 September 1993	BNP	
Ministry of Planning	Abdul Moyeen Khan	13 September 1993	19 March 1996	BNP	State Minister (M/C) was responsible.
Ministry of Local Government, Rural Development and Co-operatives	Abdus Salam Talukder	20 March 1991	19 March 1996	BNP	
Ministry of Communications	Oli Ahmad	20 March 1991	19 March 1996	BNP	
Ministry of Commerce	Mohammad Keramat Ali	20 March 1991	27 July 1991	BNP	
Ministry of Commerce	M. K. Anwar	27 July 1991	13 September 1993	BNP	
Ministry of Commerce	Shamsul Islam	13 September 1993	19 March 1996	BNP	
Ministry of Shipping	M. K. Anwar	20 March 1991	27 July 1991	BNP	
Ministry of Shipping	Mohammad Keramat Ali	27 July 1991	19 September 1991	BNP	
Ministry of Shipping	Haroon Al Rashid	19 September 1991	13 September 1993	BNP	State Minister (M/C) was responsible.
Ministry of Shipping	M. K. Anwar	13 September 1993	18 October 1995	BNP	
Ministry of Shipping	Shajahan Siraj	18 October 1995	19 March 1996	BNP	State Minister (M/C) was responsible.
Ministry of Industries	Shamsul Islam Khan	20 March 1991	12 September 1993	BNP	Resigned.
Ministry of Industries	A. M. Zahiruddin Khan	12 September 1993	4 April 1995	BNP	Resigned.
Ministry of Industries	Lutfor Rahman Khan Azad	4 April 1995	19 March 1996	BNP	State Minister (M/C) was responsible.
Ministry of Health and Family Welfare	Chowdhury Kamal Ibne Yusuf	20 March 1991	19 March 1996	BNP	
Ministry of Social Welfare	Tariqul Islam	20 March 1991	19 September 1991	BNP	State Minister (M/C) was responsible.
Ministry of Social Welfare	Tariqul Islam	19 September 1991	14 August 1993	BNP	
Ministry of Social Welfare	Fazlur Rahman Potol	14 August 1993	19 March 1996	BNP	State Minister (M/C) was responsible.
Ministry of Women and Children Affairs	Tariqul Islam	20 March 1991	19 September 1991	BNP	State Minister (M/C) was responsible.
Ministry of Women and Children Affairs	Tariqul Islam	19 September 1991	14 August 1993	BNP	
Ministry of Women and Children Affairs	Sarwari Rahman	14 August 1993	19 March 1996	BNP	State Minister (M/C) was responsible.
Ministry of Labour and Manpower	Rafiqul Islam Miah	20 March 1991	19 September 1991	BNP	State Minister (M/C) was responsible.
Ministry of Labour and Manpower	Abdul Mannan Bhuiyan	19 September 1991	10 January 1995	BNP	
Ministry of Labour and Manpower	Mir Shawkat Ali	10 January 1995	19 March 1996	BNP	
Ministry of Posts and Telecommunications	Shamsul Islam	20 March 1991	19 September 1991	BNP	State Minister (M/C) was responsible.
Ministry of Posts and Telecommunications	Mohammad Keramat Ali	19 September 1991	14 August 1993	BNP	
Ministry of Posts and Telecommunications	Tariqul Islam	14 August 1993	19 March 1996	BNP	
Ministry of Jute	Abdul Mannan Bhuiyan	20 March 1991	19 September 1991	BNP	State Minister (M/C) was responsible.
Ministry of Jute	Hannan Shah	19 September 1991	19 March 1996	BNP	
Ministry of Food	Nazmul Huda	20 March 1991	19 September 1991	BNP	State Minister (M/C) was responsible.
Ministry of Food	Shamsul Islam	19 September 1991	13 September 1993	BNP	
Ministry of Food	Mir Shawkat Ali	13 September 1993	10 January 1995	BNP	
Ministry of Food	Abdul Mannan Bhuiyan	10 January 1995	19 March 1996	BNP	
Ministry of Environment and Forest	Abdullah Al Noman	20 March 1991	19 September 1991	BNP	State Minister (M/C) was responsible.
Ministry of Environment and Forest	Abdullah Al Noman	19 September 1991	13 September 1993	BNP	
Ministry of Environment and Forest	Akbar Hossain	13 September 1993	19 March 1996	BNP	
Ministry of Fisheries and Livestock	Abdullah Al Noman	20 March 1991	19 September 1991	BNP	State Minister (M/C) was responsible.
Ministry of Fisheries and Livestock	Abdullah Al Noman	19 September 1991	19 March 1996	BNP	
Ministry of Religious Affairs	M. A. Mannan	20 March 1991	14 August 1993	BNP	State Minister (M/C) was responsible.
Ministry of Religious Affairs	Mohammad Keramat Ali	14 August 1993	18 October 1995	BNP	
Ministry of Religious Affairs	M. A. Mannan	18 October 1995	19 March 1996	BNP	State Minister (M/C) was responsible.
Ministry of Home Affairs	Abdul Matin Chowdhury	19 September 1991	19 March 1996	BNP	
Ministry of Housing and Public Works	Rafiqul Islam Miah	19 September 1991	19 March 1996	BNP	
Ministry of Science and Technology	M. A. Mannan	14 August 1993	18 October 1995	BNP	State Minister (M/C) was responsible.
Ministry of Science and Technology	M. K. Anwar	18 October 1995	19 March 1996	BNP	
Ministry of Without Portfolio	Mohammad Keramat Ali	18 October 1995	19 March 1996	BNP	

=== Minister of States (Ministry Charge) ===
Portfolio	Name	Took office	Left office	Party	Remarks
Ministry of Land	Jamiruddin Sircar	20 March 1991	28 August 1991 c.	BNP	
Ministry of Land	Kabir Hossain	19 September 1991	19 March 1996	BNP	
Ministry of Textiles	Abdul Mannan	20 March 1991	10 January 1995	BNP	
Ministry of Textiles	Abdul Mannan	10 January 1995	19 March 1996	BNP	
Ministry of Youth and Sports	Mirza Abbas	20 March 1991	17 May 1991	BNP	Resigned.
Ministry of Youth and Sports	Sadeque Hossain Khoka	17 May 1991	19 March 1996	BNP	
Ministry of Civil Aviation and Tourism	Abdul Mannan	20 March 1991	10 January 1995	BNP	
Ministry of Civil Aviation and Tourism	Abdul Mannan	10 January 1995	19 March 1996	BNP	
Ministry of Disaster Management and Relief	Lutfor Rahman Khan Azad	20 March 1991	13 September 1993	BNP	
Ministry of Disaster Management and Relief	Haroon Al Rashid	13 September 1993	19 March 1996	BNP	

=== Minister of States ===
Portfolio	Name	Took office	Left office	Party	Remarks
Ministry of Law, Justice and Parliamentary Affairs	Sheikh Razzak Ali	20 March 1991	6 April 1991	BNP	
Ministry of Law, Justice and Parliamentary Affairs	Aminul Haque	14 October 1991 c.	12 June 1993	BNP	
Ministry of Power, Energy and Mineral Resources	Khandaker Mosharraf Hossain	20 March 1991	19 September 1991	BNP	
Ministry of Local Government, Rural Development and Co-operatives	Kabir Hossain	20 March 1991	19 September 1991	BNP	
Ministry of Finance	Mojibar Rahman	20 March 1991	19 March 1996	BNP	
Ministry of Education	Yunus Khan	20 March 1991	22 November 1994	BNP	Died in Office.
Ministry of Information	Nurul Huda	20 March 1991	19 September 1991	BNP	
Ministry of Water Resources	Ansar Ali Siddiqui	20 March 1991	19 September 1991	BNP	
Ministry of Water Resources	Mosharraf Hossain Shahjahan	19 September 1991	19 March 1996	BNP	
Ministry of Establishment	Osman Ghani Khan	20 March 1991	19 September 1991	BNP	
Ministry of Establishment	Nurul Huda	19 September 1991	12 June 1993	BNP	Resigned.
Ministry of Establishment	Aminul Haque	12 June 1993	19 March 1996	BNP	
Ministry of Social Welfare	Sarwari Rahman	19 September 1991	14 August 1993	BNP	
Ministry of Women and Children Affairs	Sarwari Rahman	19 September 1991	14 August 1993	BNP	
Ministry of Environment and Forest	Gayeshwar Chandra Roy	19 September 1991	19 March 1996	BNP	
Ministry of Fisheries and Livestock	Gayeshwar Chandra Roy	19 September 1991	13 September 1993	BNP	
Ministry of Communications	Fazlur Rahman Potol	19 September 1991	14 August 1993	BNP	
Ministry of Industries	Lutfor Rahman Khan Azad	13 September 1993	4 April 1995	BNP	

=== Deputy Ministers ===
Portfolio	Name	Took office	Left office	Party
Ministry of Local Government, Rural Development and Co-operatives	Abdul Hai	19 September 1991	19 March 1996	BNP
Ministry of Law, Justice and Parliamentary Affairs	ABM Zahidul Haq	19 September 1991	14 October 1991	BNP
Ministry of Health and Family Welfare	Sirajul Haq	19 September 1991	19 March 1996	BNP
Ministry of Shipping	ABM Zahidul Haq	14 October 1991 c.	19 March 1996	BNP
