= Jatiya Mohila Songstha =

- Formation: 1972
- Headquarters: Dhaka, Bangladesh
- Region served: Bangladesh
- Official language: Bengali
- Website: totthoapa.gov.bd

Jatiya Mohila Songstha is a statutory government organization responsible for improving the living conditions of women in Bangladesh. It is located in Dhaka. Prof Mamtaz Begum is the chairperson of the Jatiya Mohila Songstha and a recipient of Begum Rokeya Padak in 2014.

== History ==
Jatiya Mohila Songstha traces its origins to the Nari Punorbashon Board, which was established in 1972 to rehabilitate women who were raped in the Bangladesh Liberation war, known in Bangladesh as Biranganas (heroines). It was renamed Mohila Sangstha on 17 February 1976. The Mohila Songstha was turned into a statutory organization on 4 May 1991. It is headed by a chairperson who heads the board of directors and executive committee of Mohila Songstha. It is under the Ministry of Women and Children Affairs. Ivy Rahman was the chairperson of the organization from 1996 to 2001. It operates 11 day care centres throughout Bangladesh.
