= 1970 Pakistani general election in East Pakistan =

Election

- 7 December 1970
- Registered: 29,479,386
- Turnout: 57.68%

| Party | AL | PDP |
| Popular vote | 12,338,921 | 483,571 |
| Percentage | 74.9% | 2.9% |
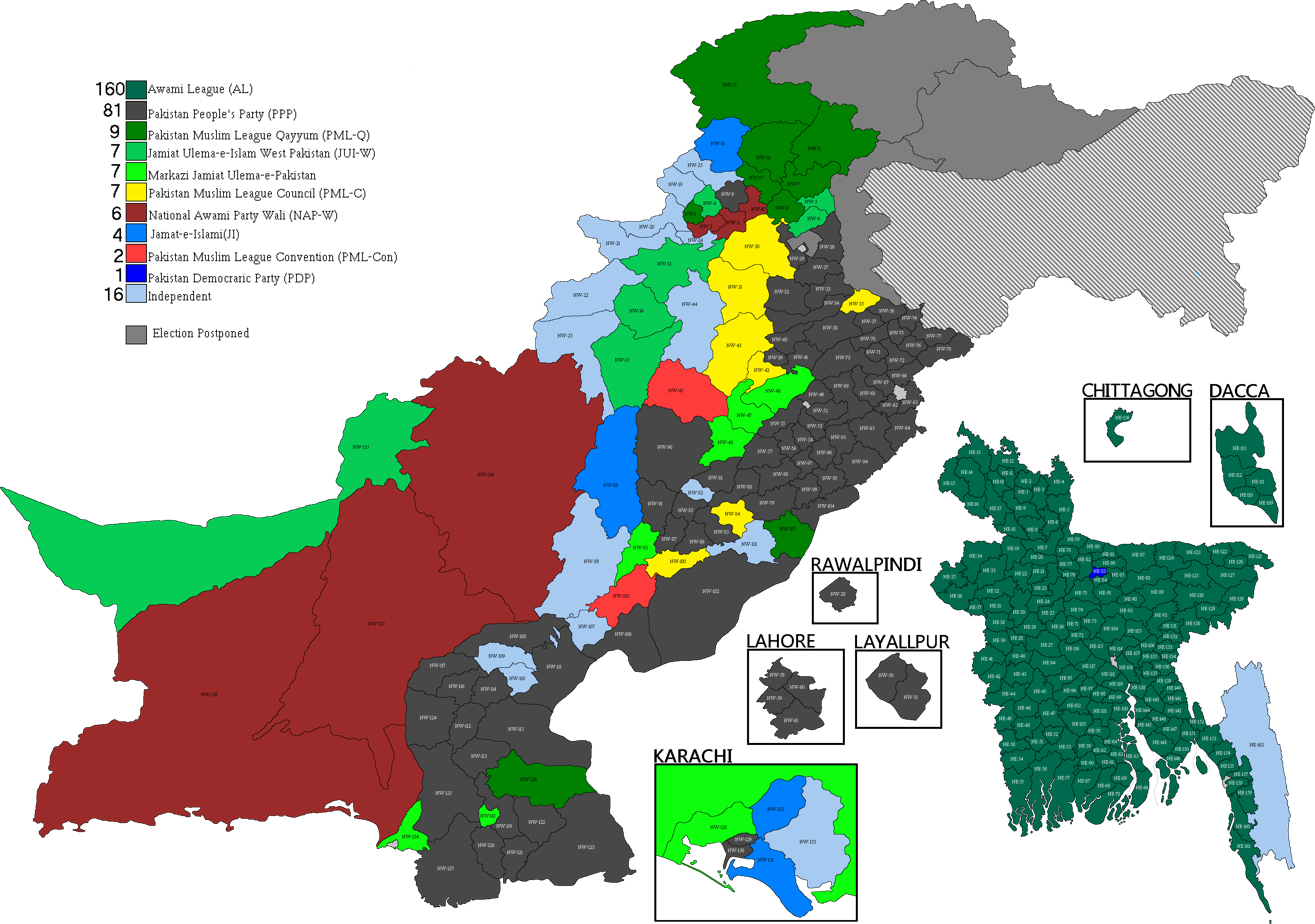
- Map of Pakistan showing National Assembly Constituencies and winning partes
President before election
Yahya Khan
President of Provisional Government-elect
Sheikh Mujibur Rahman
AL

General Elections were held in East Pakistan province on Monday 7 December 1970 to elect 169 Members of 5th National Assembly of Pakistan. Out of 169 National Assembly seats 162 were General seats and 7 were reserved for women. Awami League won 167 out of 169 seats belonging to East Pakistan in the National Assembly of Pakistan, as well as a landslide in the East Pakistan Provincial Assembly.

== Results ==
The total number of voters were 29,479,386. The number of casting votes was 17,005,163 (57.68%), the valid casting votes was 16,454,278.

| Party | Votes | % | Seats |
|---|---|---|---|
| Awami League | 12,338,921 | 74.9 | 160 |
| Jamaat-e-Islami | 991,908 | 6.0 | 0 |
| Pakistan Democratic Party | 483,571 | 2.9 | 1 |
| Convention Muslim League | 464,185 | 2.8 | 0 |
| National Awami Party (Wali) | 310,986 | 1.8 | 0 |
| Council Muslim League | 274,453 | 1.6 | 0 |
| Pakistan Muslim League (Qayyum) | 175,822 | 1.0 | 0 |
| Independent | 561,083 | 3.4 | 1 |
