= 1991 Bangladeshi constitutional referendum =

- 15 September 1991
- Should or not the President assent to the Constitution (Twelfth Amendment) Bill, 1991 of the People's Republic of Bangladesh?

Results
| Choice | Votes | % |
|---|---|---|
| Yes | 18,308,377 | 84.38% |
| No | 3,390,062 | 15.62% |
| Valid votes | 21,698,439 | 99.13% |
| Invalid or blank votes | 189,998 | 0.87% |
| Total votes | 21,888,437 | 100.00% |
| Registered voters/turnout | 62,204,118 | 35.19% |

A constitutional referendum was held in Bangladesh on 15 September 1991. Voters were asked "Should or not the President assent to the Constitution (Twelfth Amendment) Bill, 1991 of the People's Republic of Bangladesh?" The amendments would lead to the reintroduction of parliamentary government, with the President becoming the constitutional head of state, but the Prime Minister the executive head. It also abolished the position of Vice President and would see the President elected by Parliament.

The result saw 84% vote in favour, with a turnout of 35%.

== Background ==
Sheikh Mujibur Rahman led the Awami League during the independence struggle, and served as chief executive of Bangladesh from January 1972 until his assassination in August 1975. In 1974, Mujib declared a state of emergency and launched a Second Revolution in which, with the approval of parliament, he replaced the parliamentary system with a presidential one-party authoritarian system.

On 8 December 1990, President Hossain Muhammad Ershad resigned and Chief Justice Shahabuddin Ahmed, the agreed-upon candidate of the Awami League and Bangladesh National Party (BNP), assumed power as acting President. Prior to this, Ahmed had been appointed Vice President by Ershad so that the succession would follow constitutional processes. Ahmed's two assigned tasks were to organise and hold general elections as soon as possible, and meanwhile run the country without being overly interventionist. The major contestants in the elections, which were organised for February 1991, were the Awami League and the BNP, with the Jamaat-e-Islami and Jatiya Party and many other small parties and independent candidates also participating.

The Awami League, incorrectly expecting that its organisational strength would allow it to win the elections, favoured a parliamentary system, a change that would require the support of two-thirds of the members of the new parliament and the voters' approval of a referendum. The BNP argued for the continuation of the presidential system.

Following the elections, the BNP held 168 seats, the Awami League 88, the Jatiya Party 35, and Jamaat-e-Islami 20. With the BNP winning a clear majority in the 330-seat Parliament, BNP leader Begum Khaleda Zia became prime minister. However, as the BNP had received only 31 percent of the popular vote, it was not clear that it could win a presidential vote, especially if the opposition parties agreed on a common candidate, as they probably would have. Because of this, and the fact that the BNP was in power in Parliament, it seemed advantageous to the BNP to shift power from the president to Parliament.

As a result, on 2 July the BNP introduced the Constitution (Twelfth Amendment) Bill 1991. The Awami League also put forward its own constitutional amendment bill. A 15-member select committee was formed to resolve the differences. The committee produced a unanimous report and placed it before the Parliament on 6 August for approval. After two rounds of voting, the bill was passed by 307 votes to none, and the amendment was then put to a referendum.

== Results ==
| Choice | Votes | % |
|---|---|---|
| For | 18,308,377 | 84.38 |
| Against | 3,390,062 | 15.62 |
| Total | 21,698,439 | 100.00 |
| Valid votes | 21,698,439 | 99.13 |
| Invalid/blank votes | 189,998 | 0.87 |
| Total votes | 21,888,437 | 100.00 |
| Registered voters/turnout | 62,204,118 | 35.19 |
Source: Nohlen et al.

== Aftermath ==
Since the amendment, critics have argued that the reform did not assure meaningful multiparty participation in lawmaking, as the ruling party often chose to bypass the parliament in making major laws, including the 1994 Anti-Terrorist Bill, by promulgating ordinances instead of submitting proposed legislation to parliamentary committees for scrutiny. Opposition parties also often boycotted the Fifth, Seventh, and Eighth parliaments.
