= Government of Bangladesh =

- বাংলাদেশ সরকার (Bengali)
- Central government
- Government Seal • National Emblem

Overview
- Established: 10 April 1971; 55 years ago
- State: Bangladesh
- Leader: Prime Minister Tarique Rahman
- Appointed by: President Mirza Fakhrul Islam Alamgir
- Main organ: Cabinet of Bangladesh
- Ministries: 63 ministers, 353 departments and directorates
- Responsible to: Parliament of Bangladesh
- Annual budget: ৳9.30 trillion (US$76 billion)(2026–2027)
- Headquarters: Bangladesh Secretariat, Dhaka
- Website: bangladesh.gov.bd

The Government of the People's Republic of Bangladesh (Bengali: গণপ্রজাতন্ত্রী বাংলাদেশ সরকার, romanised: Gônoprojātantri Bānglādēsh Sarkār) is the central government of Bangladesh. It administers the country through the executive, legislative and judicial branches, together with constitutional bodies, statutory authorities, the civil service and local-government institutions. The constitutional framework of the government is established by the Constitution of Bangladesh, adopted on 4 November 1972 and brought into force on 16 December 1972. The Constitution declares Bangladesh a unitary, independent and sovereign republic and establishes the supremacy of the Constitution and the rule of law.

As of September 2026, Bangladesh is governed under a parliamentary system in which executive authority is exercised by the Prime Minister and Cabinet, while the President serves as head of state. The current government was formed following the 2026 general election and is headed by Prime Minister Tarique Rahman. Mirza Fakhrul Islam Alamgir has served as President since August 2026.

== Constitutional framework ==
=== Constitutional Republic ===
The Constitution is the supreme law of Bangladesh. Article 1 defines the country as a "unitary, independent, sovereign Republic" known as the People's Republic of Bangladesh. Article 7 provides that all powers of the Republic belong to the people and that their exercise must take place under the authority of the Constitution. Any law inconsistent with the Constitution is void to the extent of the inconsistency.

The Constitution establishes the principal organs of the state, including the President, Prime Minister and Cabinet, Parliament, the Supreme Court, local-government institutions and several constitutional commissions. It also establishes fundamental rights and sets out principles governing the organisation and functioning of the state.

The Constitution has been amended numerous times since 1972. Constitutional amendments require a two-thirds majority of the total membership of Parliament under Article 142, subject to the constitutional limitations recognised by the Supreme Court.

The constitutional position of the non-party caretaker government was substantially altered during this period. The system, originally introduced by the Thirteenth Amendment in 1996, was abolished by the Fifteenth Amendment in 2011. In July 2026, the Appellate Division upheld a High Court judgment declaring the repeal of the caretaker-government provisions unconstitutional and void with prospective effect, thereby restoring the constitutional caretaker-government mechanism for future elections.

=== Separation of powers ===
Bangladesh's Constitution distributes state authority among the executive, legislature and judiciary, although the parliamentary system creates a close institutional relationship between the executive and legislature. The Prime Minister and Cabinet are politically accountable to Parliament, while the judiciary exercises judicial power independently under the Constitution and laws of the Republic. Article 22 specifically directs the state to ensure the separation of the judiciary from the executive organs of the state.

The executive implements laws and administers the state; Parliament exercises legislative and financial powers and scrutinises the executive; and the courts interpret and apply the law and exercise judicial review in accordance with the Constitution.

=== Fundamental rights and principles ===
Part III of the Constitution guarantees fundamental rights, including equality before the law, protection of law, personal liberty, safeguards against arbitrary arrest and detention, freedom of movement, freedom of assembly and association, freedom of thought and conscience, freedom of speech and expression, freedom of religion and protection of property.

The Constitution's fundamental principles of state policy include nationalism, socialism, democracy and secularism. It also identifies human dignity, social justice, equality, fundamental human rights and the rule of law as important objectives of the Republic.

Fundamental principles of state policy are constitutionally significant but are not judicially enforceable in the same manner as fundamental rights. They provide a framework for legislation and governance and guide the interpretation and implementation of state policy.

== Executive ==
The executive branch is responsible for administering the state and implementing laws enacted by Parliament. It consists principally of the President, Prime Minister, Cabinet, ministries and divisions, the civil service and numerous departments, directorates and statutory agencies.

Under the Constitution, the President is the head of state, while executive power is exercised by or on the authority of the Prime Minister.

=== President ===
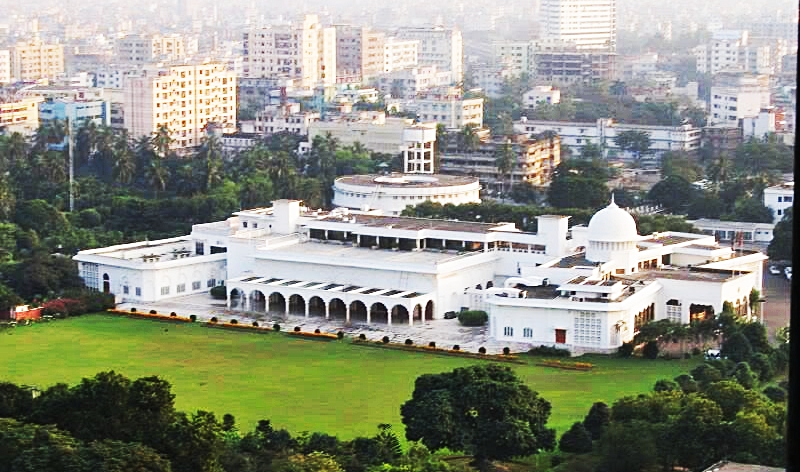
Bangabhaban, Official residence of the president. Located in Bangabhaban road, Dhaka

The President is the constitutional head of state. The President is elected by the members of the Jatiya Sangsad for a five-year term. The President takes precedence over all other persons in the state and exercises the powers and performs the duties assigned by the Constitution and laws.

Most presidential functions are exercised on the advice of the Prime Minister, although the Constitution provides specific exceptions, including the appointment of the Prime Minister and the Chief Justice. The President also serves as the Commander-in-Chief of the Bangladesh Armed Forces.

The President possesses several constitutional powers, including the power to grant pardons, reprieves, respites or remissions of punishment. The President also performs functions concerning Parliament, appointments and other constitutional matters.

As of September 2026, Mirza Fakhrul Islam Alamgir is the President of Bangladesh. He was elected by Parliament on 20 August 2026 and sworn into office on 21 August.

=== Prime Minister ===
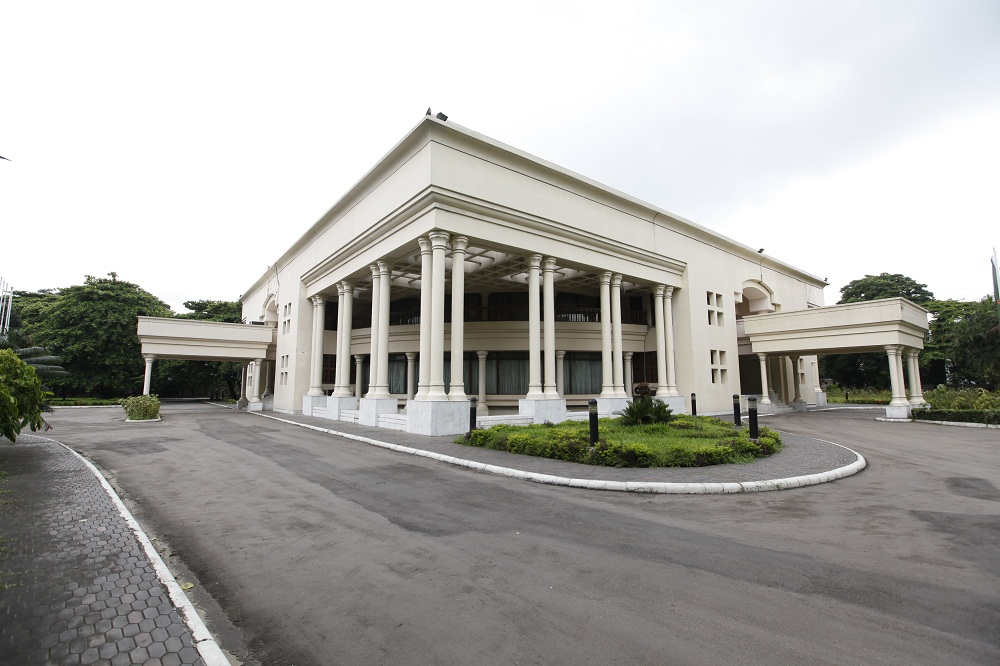
Jamuna State Guest House, Official residence of the prime minister. Located in 30 Hare road, Ramna, Dhaka

The Prime Minister is the head of government and the principal holder of executive authority. Under Article 56 of the Constitution, the President appoints as Prime Minister the member of Parliament who appears to command the support of the majority of members of Parliament.

The Prime Minister heads the Cabinet and directs the government's general policies and administration. The Cabinet is collectively responsible to Parliament. The Prime Minister also exercises authority over the administration of government ministries and departments and plays the principal role in determining national policy.

Tarique Rahman has been Prime Minister since 17 February 2026, following the 13th parliamentary election. His government is led by the Bangladesh Nationalist Party (BNP).

=== Chief Adviser ===
The Chief Adviser is the head of the non-party caretaker government established by the Constitution for the period following the dissolution of Parliament before a general election. The office is therefore not part of the ordinary executive structure of an elected government.

The non-party caretaker-government provisions were originally introduced by the Thirteenth Amendment in 1996 and were omitted by the Fifteenth Amendment in 2011. In November 2025, the Appellate Division of the Supreme Court set aside the judgment that had invalidated the caretaker-government arrangement and restored the relevant constitutional provisions. The full judgment stated that the provisions were revived prospectively.

Under the restored framework, the caretaker government becomes operative following the dissolution of a Parliament in the circumstances specified by the Constitution. The Chief Adviser and other Advisers are appointed according to the restored constitutional procedure, with the Chief Adviser heading the caretaker government during the election period.

The Supreme Court's judgment clarified that the restored caretaker-government mechanism did not apply to the 2026 parliamentary election and would operate prospectively at a future constitutional transition.

=== Cabinet ===
The Cabinet of Bangladesh consists of the Prime Minister and other ministers designated by the Prime Minister. Under Article 55 of the Constitution, the Cabinet is headed by the Prime Minister and is collectively responsible to Parliament.

Ministers are formally appointed by the President on the advice of the Prime Minister. Article 56 provides that at least nine-tenths of ministers must be appointed from among members of Parliament, while not more than one-tenth may be appointed from persons qualified for election to Parliament.

The Cabinet is the principal political decision-making body of the executive. It considers major legislation, national policies, international agreements, budgetary measures and other matters of government.

The Prime Minister may assign ministers responsibility for particular ministries or divisions. Ministers may be assisted by Ministers of State and Deputy Ministers where such positions are created.

=== Ministries and divisions ===
The central administration of Bangladesh is organised into ministries and divisions, which formulate policies and supervise their implementation through departments, directorates, agencies and other subordinate organisations.

As of 6 September 2026, the National Information Portal lists 57 ministries and divisions. It also lists 77 departments and directorates within the government framework.

The Cabinet Division coordinates the work of ministries and assists the Prime Minister in the exercise of executive functions.

Each ministry is led politically by a Minister and administered by a Secretary, a senior civil servant who oversees policy implementation and manages the overall operation of the ministry and its subordinate divisions.

Ministries of the Government of Bangladesh
| # | Ministry | Departments/Divisions |
|---|---|---|
| 1 | Ministry of Defence | Armed Forces Division; Other defence agencies |
| 2 | Ministry of Home Affairs | Public Security Division; Security Services Division |
| 3 | Ministry of Foreign Affairs | Political Affairs; Multilateral & Bilateral Wings |
| 4 | Ministry of Finance | Finance Division; Internal Resources Division; ERD; Financial Institutions Division |
| 5 | Ministry of Education | Secondary & Higher Education Division; Technical & Madrasa Education Division |
| 6 | Ministry of Law, Justice and Parliamentary Affairs | Legislative & Parliamentary Affairs Division; Law & Justice Division |
| 7 | Ministry of Local Government, Rural Development and Co-operatives | LGRD Division; Rural Development & Co-operatives Division |
| 8 | Ministry of Public Administration | Civil Service Administration; Field administration |
| 9 | Ministry of Posts, Telecommunications and Information Technology | ICT Division; Posts & Telecommunications Division |
| 10 | Ministry of Industries | BOI; BSTI; BSCIC; BCIC |
| 11 | Ministry of Housing and Public Works | Public Works Department; Urban development authorities |
| 12 | Ministry of Youth and Sports | Sports federations and youth agencies |
| 13 | Ministry of Expatriates' Welfare and Overseas Employment | BMET; BOESL |
| 14 | Ministry of Religious Affairs | Hajj Office; Waqf Administrator; Islamic Foundation; Hindu, Buddhist and Christian Welfare Trust |
| 15 | Ministry of Agriculture | DAE; BADC; Agricultural bodies |
| 16 | Ministry of Science and Technology | Atomic Energy Commission; NSTD |
| 17 | Ministry of Commerce | Trade organizations; Tariff Commissions |
| 18 | Ministry of Textiles and Jute | BJMC; BJRI; Jute Development Boards |
| 19 | Ministry of Civil Aviation and Tourism | CAAB; Biman Bangladesh Airlines; Tourism Board |
| 20 | Ministry of Primary and Mass Education | Primary education and mass education agencies |
| 21 | Ministry of Food | Food Distribution Department |
| 22 | Ministry of Land | Land Administration; Land Records & Surveys |
| 23 | Ministry of Power, Energy and Mineral Resources | Power Division; Energy & Mineral Resources Division |
| 24 | Ministry of Road Transport and Bridges | Road Transport & Highways Division; Bridges Division |
| 25 | Ministry of Railways | Bangladesh Railway |
| 26 | Ministry of Chittagong Hill Tracts Affairs | CHT Affairs Boards |
| 27 | Ministry of Social Welfare | Social Service Department |
| 28 | Ministry of Women and Children Affairs | Women and Child Development Agencies |
| 29 | Ministry of Health and Family Welfare | Health Services Division; Medical Education & Family Welfare Division |
| 30 | Ministry of Planning | Planning Commission; Statistics Division |
| 31 | Ministry of Cultural Affairs | National Museum; Bangla Academy |
| 32 | Ministry of Liberation War Affairs | Freedom Fighter welfare agencies |
| 33 | Ministry of Disaster Management and Relief | Disaster Management Department |
| 34 | Ministry of Environment, Forest and Climate Change | Department of Environment; Forest Department |
| 35 | Ministry of Water Resources | BWDB; Water authorities |
| 36 | Ministry of Fisheries and Livestock | Fisheries Department; Livestock Services |
| 37 | Ministry of Labour and Employment | Labour regulation bodies; Skills agencies |
| 38 | Ministry of Shipping | CPA; MPA; BIWTA; BIWTC |
| 39 | Ministry of Information and Broadcasting | BTV; Bangladesh Betar; PID; BFDC |

=== Civil service ===
The Bangladesh Civil Service and other services of the Republic constitute the permanent administrative machinery of the state. Civil servants implement government policies, administer public services, prepare and execute programmes and manage government institutions.

Article 133 of the Constitution provides that Parliament may regulate the appointment and conditions of service of persons employed in the service of the Republic.

Recruitment to many major civil-service positions is conducted through competitive examinations administered by the Bangladesh Public Service Commission. The Constitution provides for one or more public service commissions and assigns them functions including conducting examinations for recruitment to the service of the Republic and advising the President on matters concerning recruitment, appointment, promotion, transfer and service conditions.

The civil service includes the administrative, foreign, police, taxation, customs, education, health, engineering and other specialised cadres and services.

=== Government agencies ===
Government ministries are supported by departments, directorates, authorities, boards, commissions, corporations and other public bodies. These institutions perform specialised administrative, regulatory, developmental and service-delivery functions.

Government agencies operate in fields including education, health, agriculture, taxation, customs, public works, transport, telecommunications, energy, environmental protection, social welfare and public security.

The government also operates statutory authorities and state-owned enterprises established under legislation or other legal instruments. Their degree of administrative and financial autonomy varies according to their governing laws.

== Legislature ==
=== Jatiya Sangsad ===
Jatiya Sangsad Bhaban, Sher-e-Bangla Nagar, Dhaka

The Jatiya Sangsad, also known as the House of the Nation or National Parliament, is the unicameral legislature of Bangladesh. It exercises the legislative power of the Republic, subject to the Constitution.

The Parliament has 350 seats. Of these, 300 members are directly elected from single-member constituencies, while 50 seats are reserved for women and are allocated through proportional representation among members of Parliament. Members normally serve five-year terms.

The Parliament passes legislation, approves taxation and public expenditure, considers the national budget and exercises oversight of the executive. Parliament may also establish committees to examine government activities, bills and public administration.

The 13th Jatiya Sangsad was elected in February 2026. As of September 2026, the official parliamentary website records representation by the Bangladesh Nationalist Party, Bangladesh Jamaat-e-Islami, National Citizen Party and several other parties and independents.

The Speaker presides over parliamentary proceedings, while the Deputy Speaker assists in the conduct of parliamentary business.

=== Government and opposition ===
Bangladesh operates a parliamentary system in which the government is normally formed by the party or coalition capable of commanding a majority in the Jatiya Sangsad.

The Prime Minister and Cabinet are politically accountable to Parliament. The government introduces legislation and financial measures, while opposition parties scrutinise government policy, participate in parliamentary debate and may use parliamentary procedures to challenge government decisions.

Following the 2026 parliamentary election, the Bangladesh Nationalist Party formed the government under Prime Minister Tarique Rahman. The current Parliament contains representation from several opposition parties, including Bangladesh Jamaat-e-Islami and the National Citizens Party, as well as independent members.

=== Parliamentary committees ===
Parliamentary committees are an important mechanism for legislative scrutiny and executive oversight. They examine bills, government policies, ministry activities, public expenditure and other matters assigned to them.

Committees may summon witnesses and require the production of documents and records within their constitutional and procedural powers. The Parliament's committee system includes standing committees associated with ministries and other parliamentary functions.

The Parliament maintains a number of standing committees and subcommittees. The official parliamentary records show committees operating during the 13th Parliament.

== Judiciary ==
The judiciary of Bangladesh is headed by the Supreme Court and includes subordinate courts and tribunals established under the Constitution and legislation.

=== Supreme Court ===
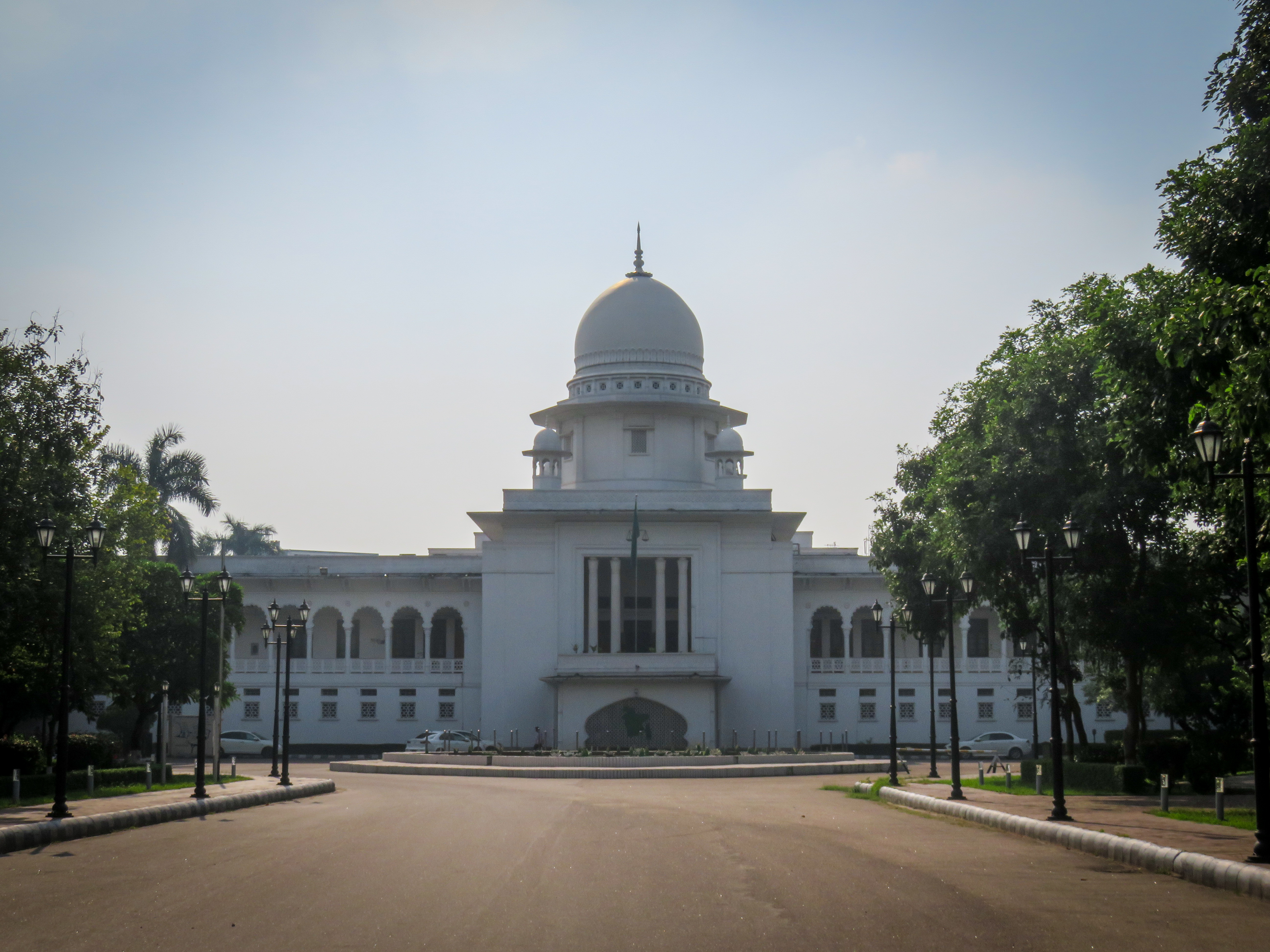
Supreme Court Building, Shahbag, Dhaka

The Supreme Court is the highest court in the country. Article 94 of the Constitution establishes the Supreme Court as consisting of two divisions: the Appellate Division and the High Court Division. The Appellate Division hears appeals from judgments, decrees, orders and sentences of the High Court Division. It also exercises other jurisdiction conferred by the Constitution and laws. The High Court Division exercises original, appellate and revisional jurisdiction and has important constitutional powers, including jurisdiction over writ petitions. It also hears appeals and revisions from subordinate courts and tribunals in matters provided by law. The Chief Justice heads the Supreme Court. The Constitution requires judges to exercise their judicial functions independently.

=== Subordinate courts ===
Below the Supreme Court is a system of civil and criminal courts operating principally at district and metropolitan levels. The judiciary includes district and sessions courts, additional district and sessions courts, joint district judges' courts, senior assistant judges' courts and assistant judges' courts, as well as magistrate courts and specialised courts and tribunals. The subordinate judiciary deals with civil disputes, criminal cases and other matters assigned by legislation. Specialised tribunals and courts have been established for particular areas of law, including financial, administrative, labour, family and other disputes.

== Constitutional and independent bodies ==
Several institutions operate independently of ordinary ministerial administration because their powers and status are established directly by the Constitution or by legislation.

=== Election Commission ===
The Bangladesh Election Commission is an independent constitutional body established under Article 118 of the Constitution. It consists of the Chief Election Commissioner and not more than four Election Commissioners. Election Commissioners have five-year terms.

The Commission has constitutional responsibility for the preparation of electoral rolls and the conduct of elections to the office of President and to Parliament. It also delimits parliamentary constituencies and performs other electoral functions assigned by the Constitution or law.

The Commission also conducts elections to local-government institutions under the relevant legislation.

=== Comptroller and Auditor General ===
The Comptroller and Auditor General is a constitutional office established under Article 127. The Comptroller and Auditor General is appointed by the President and audits the public accounts of the Republic and other public institutions within the constitutional and statutory framework.

Audit reports are submitted to the President and laid before Parliament. The office is an important component of public financial accountability because it independently examines the use of public funds.

=== Public Service Commission ===
The Bangladesh Public Service Commission is a constitutional institution established under Part IX of the Constitution. Article 137 provides for one or more public service commissions, while Article 140 assigns them functions relating to recruitment and public-service appointments.

The Commission conducts competitive examinations for recruitment to the service of the Republic and advises the government on recruitment, appointments, promotions, transfers and disciplinary matters in accordance with the Constitution and relevant laws.

=== Other commissions ===
Bangladesh has a number of statutory independent or quasi-independent commissions and authorities established by Acts of Parliament.

The Anti-Corruption Commission was established under the Anti-Corruption Commission Act, 2004. It investigates allegations of corruption and related offences, conducts inquiries and prosecutions within its statutory mandate, and undertakes measures intended to prevent corruption. The Commission describes itself as an independent institution for the control and prevention of corruption.

The National Human Rights Commission was established under the National Human Rights Commission Act, 2009. It is a statutory independent institution concerned with the promotion and protection of human rights and may investigate complaints and make recommendations concerning human-rights issues.

The Information Commission was established under the Right to Information Act, 2009 as a statutory independent institution. It oversees implementation of the right to information, considers complaints relating to access to information and assists in promoting transparency and accountability in public administration.

Other statutory bodies perform regulatory, advisory, investigative or oversight functions in specific sectors.

== Local government ==
Bangladesh is a unitary state with a system of elected local government operating alongside the central government's field administration. The country is administratively divided into 8 divisions, 64 districts, 499 upazilas and 4,567 unions, according to the National Information Portal's figures published in September 2026. Local-government institutions include:

- City corporations in major metropolitan areas;
- Municipalities (pourashavas) in urban areas;
- Zila parishads at district level;
- Upazila parishads at subdistrict level; and
- Union parishads at union level.

The Constitution provides for elected local-government bodies in every administrative unit in which Parliament establishes local government. Article 60 provides that Parliament shall confer powers on local-government bodies, including authority to impose local taxes, prepare budgets and maintain funds. Local-government institutions perform functions relating to local infrastructure, sanitation, public health, roads, markets, community development and other services assigned by legislation. The central government also maintains a field administration through divisional, district and upazila-level officials. These administrative officers are part of the national civil service and are distinct from elected local-government representatives.

== Public finance ==
The Government of Bangladesh finances its operations primarily through taxation and other domestic revenues, supplemented by borrowing and external assistance. Fiscal policy is administered principally through the Ministry of Finance, while tax administration and customs are primarily the responsibility of the National Board of Revenue. Government expenditure is divided broadly between recurrent expenditure and development expenditure, with the latter including allocations for the Annual Development Programme.

=== Economy ===
Bangladesh operates a mixed economy in which the government regulates economic activity through fiscal, monetary, trade and development policies while private enterprises play a major role in production, investment and employment. Government economic policy includes the management of public finances, infrastructure development, social protection, education, health, agriculture, industry, trade and investment.

The government prepares medium-term macroeconomic and fiscal frameworks and formulates development programmes through the Ministry of Finance, the Planning Commission and other relevant institutions. The Bangladesh Bank, although institutionally separate from the central government, is responsible for monetary policy and the regulation and supervision of the banking system.

=== Revenue and taxation ===
Government revenue is derived principally from taxation, supplemented by non-tax revenue, fees, dividends and other receipts.

The National Board of Revenue is the principal tax-administration authority of Bangladesh. It administers major sources of tax revenue, including income tax, value-added tax and customs duties. The NBR describes itself as the apex body of tax administration and identifies tax-revenue collection as one of its principal responsibilities.

The tax system includes direct and indirect taxes. Income tax is imposed under the country's income-tax legislation, while value-added tax is imposed on taxable supplies and imports subject to statutory exemptions and conditions. Customs duties and other import-related taxes are administered through the customs system.

The government changes tax rates, exemptions, duties and other fiscal measures through annual budget legislation, Finance Acts and amendments to relevant tax laws.

=== Expenditure ===
Government expenditure consists of recurrent and development expenditure. Recurrent expenditure includes salaries and allowances of public employees, pensions, interest payments, subsidies, transfers and the operation of government institutions. Development expenditure finances infrastructure, economic development, social programmes and other projects.

The Constitution requires an annual financial statement containing estimated government receipts and expenditure to be laid before Parliament for each financial year.

Public expenditure is subject to parliamentary appropriation and audit by the Comptroller and Auditor General within the constitutional and statutory framework.

=== Annual budget ===
The government's fiscal year runs from 1 July to 30 June of the following year. The Ministry of Finance prepares the national budget, which is presented to Parliament for consideration and approval.

For fiscal year 2026–27, the government proposed a total national budget of Tk 9.38 lakh crore (Tk 9.38 trillion), making it the largest national budget in Bangladesh at the time. The budget was presented to the Jatiya Sangsad on 11 June 2026 by Finance Minister Amir Khosru Mahmud Chowdhury.

The FY2026–27 budget projected government revenue of approximately Tk 6.95 lakh crore, including approximately Tk 6.04 lakh crore from the National Board of Revenue. The projected fiscal deficit was approximately Tk 2.43 lakh crore, equivalent to about 3.6% of GDP.

The budget was the first national budget of the government formed after the 2026 general election and placed emphasis on macroeconomic stability, investment, employment, social protection and economic reform.

== Issues ==
=== Corruption ===
Corruption has been a longstanding governance issue in Bangladesh. Concerns have included bribery, abuse of public office, procurement irregularities, influence over public institutions, embezzlement and weaknesses in enforcement and accountability.

The Anti-Corruption Commission is the principal specialised state institution responsible for investigating and prosecuting corruption offences within its statutory jurisdiction. Its functions include inquiries and investigations into alleged corruption and related offences and prosecution of cases under the Anti-Corruption Commission Act.

Corruption is also addressed through public financial auditing, parliamentary oversight, judicial proceedings, access-to-information mechanisms and administrative controls.

International assessments continue to identify corruption as a significant governance challenge. In the 2025 Corruption Perceptions Index, published by Transparency International in February 2026, Bangladesh received a score of 24 out of 100 and ranked 150th out of 182 countries and territories. The index measures perceived levels of public-sector corruption rather than the number of proven corruption cases.

The effectiveness and independence of anti-corruption institutions, enforcement of laws, transparency in public procurement, political accountability and the capacity of public institutions remain subjects of public and policy debate.

== See also ==
- Politics of Bangladesh
- List of office-holders in the Government of Bangladesh
- Judiciary of Bangladesh
- List of political parties in Bangladesh
- List of People's Republic of Bangladesh governments
