= 1977 Bangladeshi presidential confidence referendum =

- Do you have confidence in President Major General Ziaur Rahman and the policies and programs adopted by him?

Results
Choice	Votes	%
Yes	33,400,870	98.88%
No	378,898	1.12%
Valid votes	33,779,768	100.00%
Invalid or blank votes	0	0.00%
Total votes	33,779,768	100.00%
Registered voters/turnout	38,363,858	88.05%

A national vote of confidence on President Ziaur Rahman was held in Bangladesh on 30 May 1977. Voters were asked, "Do you have confidence in President Major General Ziaur Rahman and the policies and programs adopted by him?". President Zia won an overwhelming victory in the referendum as the result saw 98.9% of votes saying yes, with a voter turnout of 88.1%.

== Results ==
Choice	Votes	%
For	33,400,870	98.9
Against	378,898	1.1
Invalid/blank votes	0	–
Total	33,779,768	100
Registered voters/turnout	38,363,858	88.1
Source: Nohlen et al.
