= A. K. Abdul Momen =

Former Minister of Foreign Affairs of Bangladesh

- এ. কে. আব্দুল মোমেন
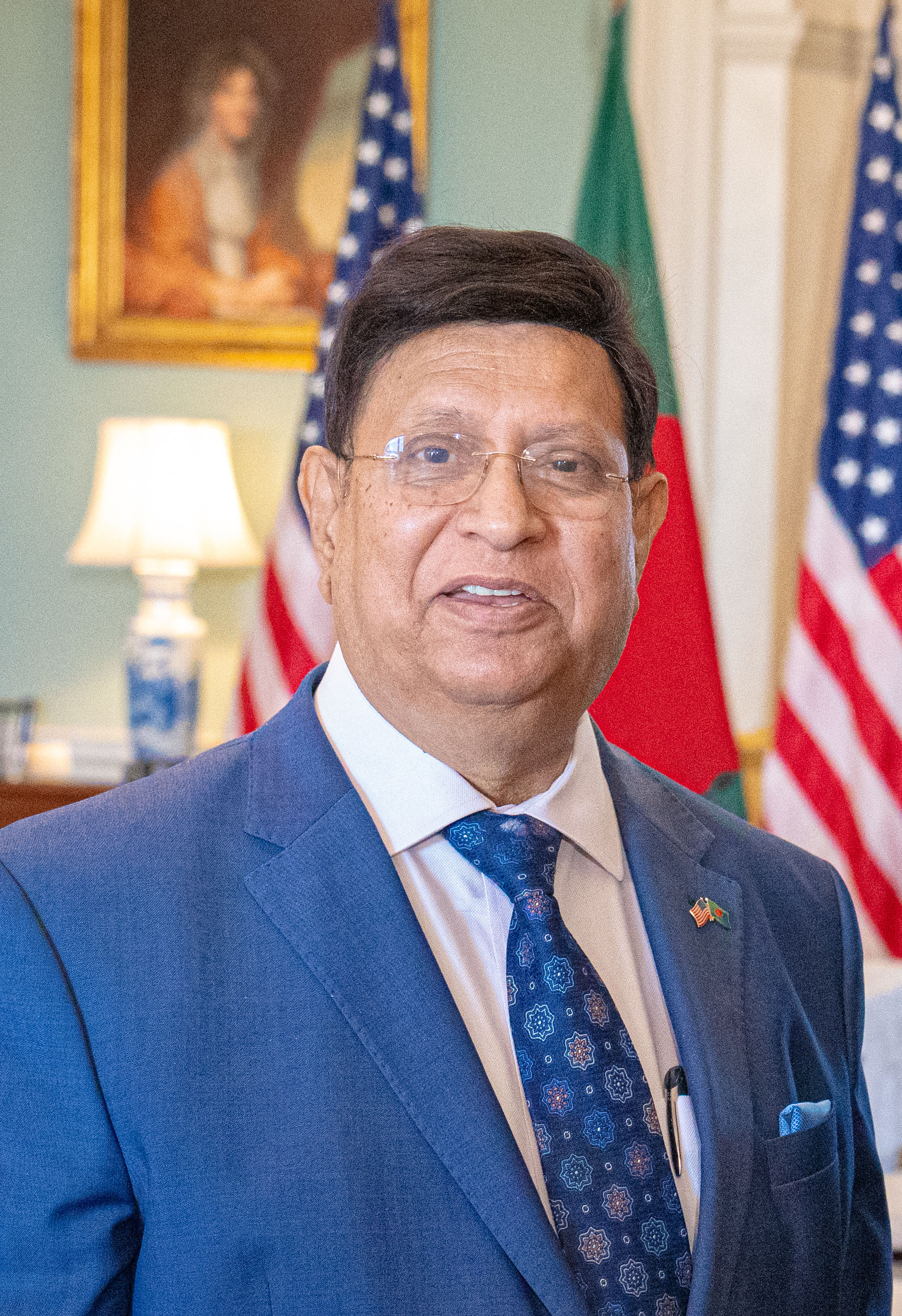
- Abdul Momen in 2023

Member of Parliament
- In office 30 January 2019 – 6 August 2024
- Preceded by: Abul Maal Abdul Muhith
- Succeeded by: Khandaker Abdul Muktadir
- Constituency: Sylhet-1

Minister of Foreign Affairs
- In office 7 January 2019 – 10 January 2024
- Prime Minister: Sheikh Hasina
- Preceded by: Abul Hassan Mahmood Ali
- Succeeded by: Hasan Mahmud

Permanent Representative of Bangladesh to the United Nations
- In office 26 August 2009 – 30 October 2015
- Preceded by: Ismat Jahan
- Succeeded by: Masud Momen

President of UNICEF
- In office 2010–2010
- Preceded by: Oumar Daou
- Succeeded by: Sanja Štiglic

Personal details
- Born: 23 August 1947 (age 79) Sylhet, East Bengal, Dominion of Pakistan
- Party: Awami League
- Parents: Abu Ahmad Abdul Hafiz (father); Syeda Shahar Banu (mother)
- Relatives: AM Abdul Muhith (brother); Shahla Khatun (sister); Abdul Hamid (granduncle)
- Education: University of Dhaka; Northeastern University

Abul Kalam Abdul Momen (born 23 August 1947), known as AK Abdul Momen, is a Bangladeshi economist, diplomat, and politician who served as minister of foreign affairs from January 2019 to January 2024. He served as permanent representative of Bangladesh to the United Nations from August 2009 until October 2015. He was elected a member of Jatiya Sangsad from the Sylhet-1 constituency at the 2018 general elections. Following his election, he was appointed the minister of foreign affairs by the Prime Minister Sheikh Hasina.

== Background and education ==
Abdul Momen was born on 23 August 1947, to a Bengali Muslim political family in Sylhet. His father was Abu Ahmad Abdul Hafiz, a lawyer, who was one of the founders of the Sylhet branch of the All-India Muslim League and took part in the Pakistan Movement. His mother, Syeda Shahar Banu, was one of the leading women of the Bengali language movement. He was one of fourteen children. His elder brother was AM Abdul Muhith, a former minister of finance, and his sister is Shahla Khatun, a physician and National Professor of Bangladesh.

Abdul Momen passed the matriculation exam from Sylhet Government Pilot High School. He attended the University of Dhaka and earned a BA in economics in 1969, and an MA in development economics in 1971.

== Career ==
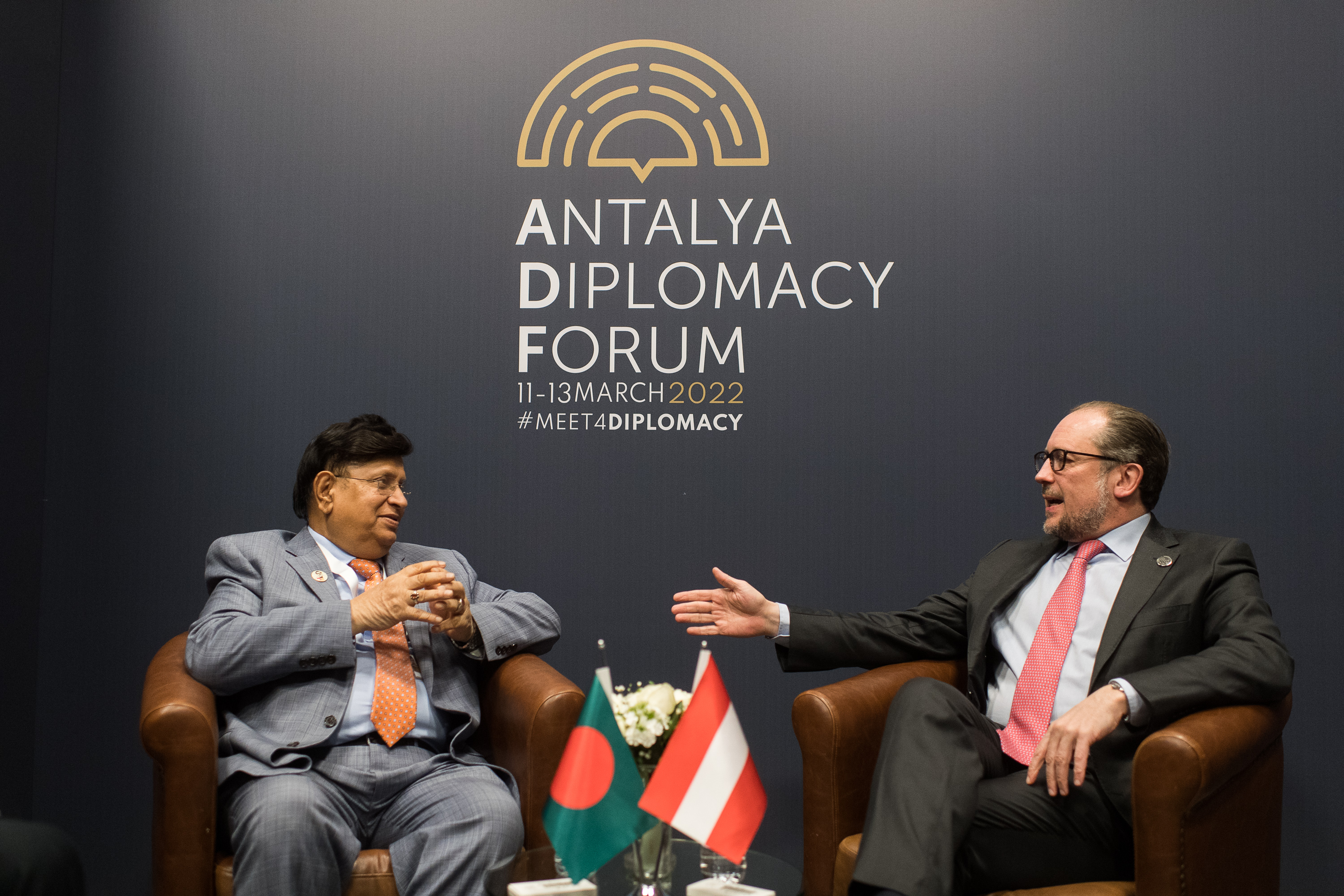
Abdul Momen with Alexander Schallenberg at the Antalya Diplomacy Forum in 2022

Abdul Momen became a civil servant, serving as private secretary to the minister of rural development, local government and cooperatives from 1973 to 1974; private secretary to the minister of trade and commerce, and mineral resources and petroleum from 1974 to 1975; section officer, South Asia, East Asia and Middle East, Ministry of Commerce from 1975 to 1976; and director, Office of the President's Advisor on Trade and Commerce from 1976 to 1978. Meanwhile, he completed an LLB in law and jurisprudence from Central College, Dhaka, in 1976.

Abdul Momen continued his education in the United States, receiving a MPA from Harvard Kennedy School and a PhD in economics from Northeastern University, Boston, Massachusetts, in 1988. He taught economics and business administration at Merrimack College, Salem State College, Northeastern University, the University of Massachusetts, Kennedy School of Government at Harvard University and the American International University-Bangladesh.

In 1998, Abdul Momen became an economic adviser at the Saudi Industrial Development Fund (SIDF). He left Saudi Arabia in the wake of the 2003 Riyadh compound bombings, and returned to Massachusetts. There he taught in the Department of Economics and Business Administration at Framingham State College until appointed Bangladesh's permanent representative to the United Nations in New York in August 2009.

Abdul Momen served as president of the UNICEF executive board at the international level in 2010. He was vice president and acting president of the 67th United Nations General Assembly. He was the president of the United Nations High-Level Committee on South-South Cooperation in 2014.

Abdul Momen's elder brother, Bangladesh's Minister of Finance Abul Maal Abdul Muhith, hoped that Abdul Momen would succeed him as a member of the parliament representing the Sylhet-1 constituency in the 2018 general election, which he eventually won.

Yahoo news reported that Abdul Momen said in February 2020 that Bangladesh had "no obligation" to provide shelter to Rohingya refugees who were stranded in the Andaman Sea on a ship. He asked the UNHCR to take the responsibility.
