= ASM Nasiruddin Elan =

ASM Nasiruddin Elan is a Bangladeshi human rights activist and director of Odhikar, a human-rights organization. He is a member of the Police Reform Commission formed by the Muhammad Yunus led Interim government of Bangladesh.

== Career ==
In 2007, Elan was the acting director of Odhikar. Odhikar was founded in 1994.

In November 2013, Elan was sent to prison over a case filed regarding Odhikars report on the 2013 Shapla Square protests. Odhikars reported number of deaths in the police operation in Shapla Square to remove activists of Hefazat-e-Islam Bangladesh was more than the government reported number. Hasanul Haq Inu, Minister of Information, demanded Odhikar share the list of deaths but was Odhikar refused over security concerns. The case was filed by the Detective Branch in 2013. In 2017, the Bangladesh High Court refused to squash the case following a petition by Elan and Adilur Rahman Khan.

The NGO Affairs Bureau refused to renew registration of Odhikar in June 2021 accusing its reports had damaged the image of Bangladesh.

In September 2023, Elan and Adilur Rahman Khan were sentenced to two years imprisonment under Section 57 of the Information and Communication Technology Act, 2006 over their report on the 2013 Shapla Square protests. The conviction was condemned by the United States Embassy in Dhaka and a number of international human rights organizations. Their conviction was condemned by The Daily Star. 27 human rights organizations demanded their release. They filed an appeal against their conviction with the Bangladesh High Court. Human Rights Watch, CIVICUS Monitor, France and Germany condemned the conviction. In October 2023, they secured bail from the High Court and were released from prison. Justice Md Emdadul Haque Azad accused the public prosecutor and the government of Bangladesh of turning Bangladesh into "hell".

After the fall of the Sheikh Hasina led Awami League government, Elan was made a member of the Police Reform Commission. He was critical of successive police governments using police to target political rivals. His and Adilur Rahman Khan's two-year conviction was overturned by Justice Md Abdur Rob.
