= Abu Ahmad Abdul Hafiz =

Bengali lawyer, teacher, and politician (1900–1985)

- আবু আহমদ আব্দুল হাফিজ
- Born: 2 June 1900; British Raj
- Died: 9 February 1985 (aged 84); Bangladesh
- Other name: AA Abdul Hafiz
- Education: Sylhet Government School; Rajshahi College; University of Calcutta
- Political party: All-India Muslim League (1939–1947); Muslim League (1947–1952)
- Spouse: Syeda Shahar Banu
- Children: AM Abdul Muhith; AK Abdul Momen; Shahla Khatun
- Relatives: Abdul Hamid (uncle)

Abu Ahmad Abdul Hafiz (Bengali: আবু আহমদ আব্দুল হাফিজ; 2 June 1900 – 9 February 1985), also known by his daak naam Wakil Mia (Bengali: উকিল মিঞা, romanized: Ukil Miã), was a Bengali lawyer, teacher and politician who had a leading role in the Pakistan Movement and the reincorporation of the Sylhet district into East Bengal.

== Early life and education ==
Abu Ahmad Abdul Hafiz was born on 2 June 1900, to a Bengali Muslim family in Sonarpara, Sylhet. His father was Khan Bahadur Abdur Rahim, the son of Munshi Abdul Qadir of Rainagar Mahalla. His father was a graduate of Calcutta University and later joined Assam Civil Service as a deputy magistrate. At one point of time his father was the Manager of Prithimpassa Nawab Estate. His paternal grandmother, Moti Bibi, was the daughter of Muhammad Uzayr, an influential leader of Rainagar. The family, originally from Darzipara, later moved from Sonarpara to the Mukhtar Khan Kirmani neighbourhood. At the age of three years, Abdul Hafiz's mother Hafiza Banu, daughter of Abdul Qadir of nearby Pathantula, passed away (although his father maintained close ties with her family). Her paternal uncle was Moulvi Abdul Karim and her brother, Abdul Hamid, was the Education Minister of Assam and later Pakistan.

Abdul Hafiz's paternal uncle, Abdur Rashid, was a close mentor during his childhood. He completed his matriculation from Sylhet Government School in 1917, and his FA Second Division from Murari Chand College in 1919.

His activist career began with his involvement in the Khilafat Movement during his youth which called for the restoration of the Ottoman Caliphate. At the time, his father was working in Nowgong, and subsequently sent Abdul Hafiz to the care of his maternal uncle Abdul Hakim Qurayshi, a professor at the Rajshahi College. Abdul Hafiz then studied at this college where he gained his BA in 1922.

He then proceeded to study at the University of Calcutta. His teachers included Abdullah Suhrawardy, Moulvi Abdul Karim, Sir Abdur Rahim, his father's classmate A. K. Fazlul Huq and Ashutosh Mukherjee. During his time there, he served as the secretary of the Surma Valley Students Association. He graduated in 1925 with a MA in Arabic and a BL.

== Career ==
After graduating, he returned to Sylhet where he became a teacher at the Sylhet Government School, before starting his own practice as an advocate. In 1927, he became the secretary of the Sylhet Tabligh and Tanzim Committee, and even sent a mission to the Khasi and Jaintia Hills. In Aurangapur, he permanently established a public welfare organisation. The mission was led by Syed Yaqub Bakht, Mawlana Sakhawatul Ambiya, Dr Murtaza Chowdhury and Mawlana Abdur Rahman Singkaponi. He was also the secretary of the All-India Tabligh Committee's Assam provincial branch and the Khadimul Islam Society's Sylhet district branch. For a long time, Abdul Hafiz was a member of the managing committee for Sylhet Shahi Eidgah and Manik Pir Hill. In 1929, he established the Bakhtiar Bibi Girls School in Rainagar and assisted Zamindar Brajendra Narayan Chaudhury in founding Sylhet Women's College.

He was an Ordinary Fellow of the University of Calcutta from 1932 to 28 April 1938, being succeeded by Moulavi Abdul Bari Chaudhuri. This latter role allowed him to develop close relations with Huseyn Shaheed Suhrawardy, Syama Prasad Mukherjee, Sir Azizul Haque and Bidhan Chandra Roy. After establishment of the Comilla Education Board, he served as member of its Selection Committee.

In 1939, Abdul Hafiz joined the All-India Muslim League and became a founding secretary of its Sylhet branch in 1941. He worked alongside his uncle Minister Abdul Hamid, Khan Bahadur Modabbir Husayn Chowdhury, Minister Munawwar Ali of Sunamganj, Minister Abdul Matin Chaudhary, Haji Usman Mia Merchant and Haji Wasif Ullah. In the lead-up to the 1947 Sylhet referendum, he became the general secretary of the Referendum Board that was in charge of the referendum for Muslim League. Among his efforts was inviting Sahul Usmani from Bihar to give a pro-partition speech to the masses in Sylhet, as well as assisting the Radcliffe Boundary Commission.

Shortly after the independence of Pakistan, Bengali language movement started. In 1948, Abdul Hafiz presided over the largest public meeting in Sylhet in support of the language protestors at Gobind Park (currently Hasan Market, Sylhet) despite being a Muslim League leader. His wife, Syeda Shahar Banu, was one of the leading women organizers of the movement. Abdul Hafiz disassociated himself from the Muslim League in 1952, and began to dedicated his life instead to education and social welfare.

Abdul Hafiz worked with the Red Crescent and Sylhet Maternal Care Committee, and contributed to the establishment of a maternal care facility in Sylhet. The Shaheed Sulaiman Hall (former Jinnah Hall) was founded under his supervision. He was also involved in cooperative movements. He was the secretary of Sylhet Cooperative Central Bank Limited, president of Sylhet Cooperative Town Bank and member of Surma Valley Muslim Cooperative Jute Marketing Society. In 1951, he joined the Cooperative Seminar in Karachi. For over 30 years, he was president of Postal Department Union. He was made an Honorary Professor of the Madan Mohan College and the Sylhet Government Women's College. In 1968, Abdul Hafiz founded the Sylhet Law College and served as its principal until 1981.

== Death and legacy ==
Abu Ahmad Abdul Hafiz died in Bangladesh on 9 February 1985. During his birth centenary in 2000, his biography was published in the Bengali language. Within this, the award-winning Bengali poet, Dilwar Khan, dedicated the poem Nodir Uttoradhikare to him. He had fourteen children in total including Professor Dr. Abu Ahmad Abdul Muhsi, Dr. AK Abdul Mubin and National Professor Dr. Shahla Khatun. His son, Abul Maal Abdul Muhith, was the former Finance Minister of Government of Bangladesh. Another son, Abul Kalam Abdul Momen, was the Minister of Foreign Affairs of Government of Bangladesh.

== See also ==
- Zobeda Khanom Chowdhury
