= Abdur Rob (justice) =

Bangladeshi Judge

Justice of the High Court Division of Bangladesh
- Incumbent
- Assumed office 2002

Personal details
- Born: 10 September 1958 (age 68)
- Education: University of Dhaka
- Profession: Judge

Abdur Rob is a justice of the High Court Division of the Bangladesh Supreme Court.

== Early life ==
Abdur Rob was born on 10 September 1958. He obtained his bachelor's degree and master's in political science from the University of Dhaka. He also finished his law degree at the University of Dhaka.

== Career ==
Abdur Rob became a lawyer of the District Courts in 1987. In 1990, Abdur Rob moved up to become a lawyer in the High Court Division and the Supreme Court in 2002.

Abdur Rob was appointed an additional judge of the High Court Division on 18 April 2010. He was made a permanent judge of the High Court Division on 15 April 2012.

In July 2012, Abdur Rob and Justice Farah Mahbub ordered Bangladesh Biman to reinstate employees fired under the Voluntary Retirement Scheme in 2007. Abdur Rob and Justice Farah Mahbub ordered the Rapid Action Battalion in August to investigate the Aminbazar killing of seven students. Abdur Rob and Justice Farah Mahbub declared an amendment to the constitution of Bangladesh Cricket Board by the National Sports Council illegal. Their order was stayed by Justice Syed Mahmud Hossain of the Appellate Division. Abdur Rob and Justice Farah Mahbub summoned AM Md Sayeed, Kishoreganj District and sessions judge, for failure to reinstate process servers fired in 2007 and who had secured a High Court verdict in their favor.

In January 2014, Abdur Rob and Justice Shahidul Islam gave a split verdict in the 2007 Narsingdi murder case in which seven defendants were sentenced to death. Abdur Rob upheld the death sentences while Islam had turned it down. Justice Bhabani Prasad Singha then heard the case and upheld the death sentences.

In August 2015, Abdur Rob and Justice Md Nuruzzaman rejected a petition by former prime minister Khaleda Zia seeking files on the Barapukuria coal mine corruption case. They lifted the freeze on the coal mine case and ordered proceedings to begin. Abdur Rob and Justice Md Nuruzzaman denied bail to the mayor of Habiganj, Golam Kibria Gaus, in the Shah A M S Kibria murder case.
