= Stiglic =

Štiglic or Štiglić is a surname. Notable people with the surname include:

- France Štiglic (1919–1993), Slovenian film director and screenwriter
- Sanja Štiglic (born 1970), Slovenian diplomat and politician
- Srećko Štiglić (born 1943), Croatian athlete
