= Abul Maal Abdul Muhith =

Bangladesh politician, economist (1934–2022)

- আবুল মাল আব্দুল মুহিত
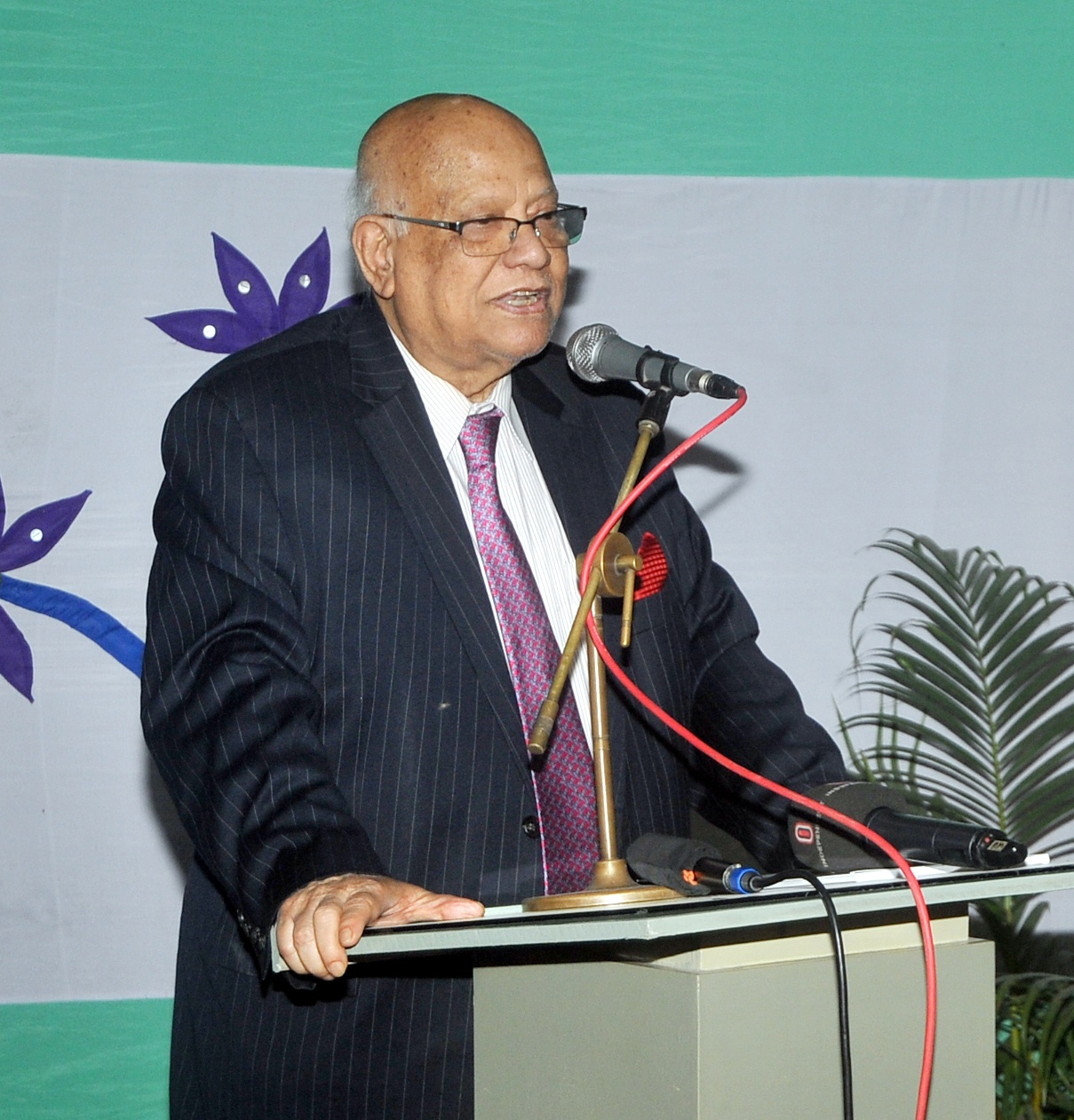
- Muhith in 2018

Minister of Finance
- In office 6 January 2009 – 7 January 2019
- President: Iajuddin Ahmed; Zillur Rahman; Mohammad Abdul Hamid
- Prime Minister: Sheikh Hasina
- Preceded by: Mirza Azizul Islam (acting)
- Succeeded by: Mustafa Kamal
- In office 27 March 1982 – 31 January 1984
- President: A. F. M. Ahsanuddin Chowdhury; Hussain Muhammad Ershad
- Preceded by: Saifur Rahman
- Succeeded by: Hussain Muhammad Ershad

Member of Parliament
- In office 6 January 2009 – 7 January 2019
- Preceded by: Saifur Rahman
- Succeeded by: AK Abdul Momen
- Constituency: Sylhet-1

Personal details
- Born: 25 January 1934 Sylhet, Assam Province, British India (now Bangladesh)
- Died: 30 April 2022 (aged 88) Dhaka, Bangladesh
- Resting place: Raynagar, Sylhet
- Party: Bangladesh Awami League
- Parents: Abu Ahmad Abdul Hafiz (father); Syeda Shahar Banu (mother)
- Relatives: AK Abdul Momen (brother); Shahla Khatun (sister); Abdul Hamid (granduncle)
- Education: Sylhet Government Pilot High School; Murari Chand College
- Alma mater: University of Dhaka; University of Oxford; Harvard University
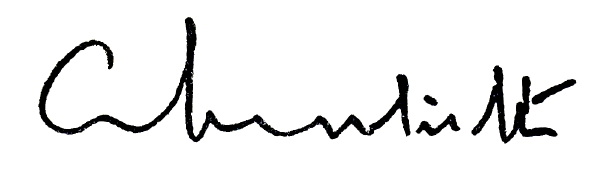
- Signature

Abul Maal Abdul Muhith (25 January 1934 – 30 April 2022) was a Bangladeshi economist, writer, civil servant, secretary, diplomat and politician. He served as the finance minister of the government of Bangladesh from January 2009 until January 2019.

== Early life and education ==
Abdul Muhith was born on 25 January 1934, to a Bengali Muslim political family in Sylhet. His father, Abu Ahmad Abdul Hafiz, a judge by profession, was one of the founders of the Sylhet branch of the All-India Muslim League and took part in the Pakistan Movement. His mother, Syeda Shahar Banu, was one of the leading women of the Bengali language movement. He was the third child in a family of fourteen children. His younger brother is AK Abdul Momen, former minister of foreign affairs for Bangladesh, and his sister is Shahla Khatun, a physician and National Professor of Bangladesh.

Abdul Muhith passed the matriculation exam from Sylhet Government Pilot High School in 1949. He secured first place in his Intermediate examination in 1951 from Murari Chand College. He stood first class first in B.A. (Hons.) in English literature in 1953 from the University of Dhaka and passed his master's with credit from the same university in 1955. While in service to the government, he studied at the University of Oxford during 1957–1958. He completed his Master of Public Administration degree at Harvard University in 1964.

== Early career ==
Abdul Muhith served as the general secretary of the central committee of the Pakistan Civil Service Association during 1960–1969. He joined the Pakistan Embassy in the United States as an economic counselor in 1969. In 1966, he was honoured with the Tamgha e Khidmat award by the Pakistan government. During his service as the chief and deputy secretary of the Pakistan Planning Commission, he made a report on the discrimination between East and West Pakistan, and that was the first submitted report on that issue in the Pakistan National Congress. He was the first diplomat of the Washington Embassy who showed his consent in favour of Bangladesh, giving up the side of Pakistan during the Independence War of 1971. He was appointed the secretary of planning in 1972 and secretary of the External Resource Department of the Finance and Planning Ministry in 1977.

== Retirement and return ==
Abdul Muhith went for self-retirement in 1981 from his service, and then he started his second innings of his career as the specialist of economics and development in the Ford Foundation and in the International Fund for Agricultural Development (IFAD). He became finance and planning minister in 1982–83. Next, he worked as the specialist of different institutions of the World Bank and the United Nations. He has been a recognised figure in the World Bank, International Monetary Fund, IDB and in different organisations of United Nations. He was the visiting fellow of Princeton University in 1984 and 1985.

Abdul Muhith took the oath as the finance minister of the Bangladeshi government on 6 January 2009, and in August 2009 he inaugurated the building of the Benapole Customs and Immigration Check Post.

Abdul Muhith retired from the government and from his role as a Jatiya Sangsad member for the Sylhet-1 constituency at the elections of December 2018. His younger brother AK Abdul Momen succeeded him as the constituency representative.

== Personal life ==
Abdul Muhith was married to designer Syeda Sabia. They had three children.

On 5 March 2022, Abdul Muhith was taken to Green Life Hospital in Dhaka due to illness. He died on 30 April 2022 at United Hospital.

His funeral (1st namaz-e-janaza) was held on the premises of Gulshan Azad Masjid in the capital of Dhaka.

== Criticism ==
Abdul Muhith faced criticism for his handling of the 2011 share market crash. He admitted to mistakes in his decisions related to the stock market and to mistakes of the Bangladesh Securities and Exchange Commission. Although the opposition leaders and protesting investors called for his resignation, he refused and defended his position. He appointed a probe committee to investigate the allegations against the Securities Exchange Commission, but refused to publicly disclose the names of those accused by this committee.

Abdul Muhith faced criticism after commenting that the Tk 4,000 crore embezzled in the Hallmark money scam was a "meager amount". He later apologized for his statement.

Abdul Muhith was criticised for describing Nobel laureate Muhammad Yunus's comments as "totally rubbish" and also for saying Yunus had no integrity over the Grameen Bank issue.

In September 2015, Abdul Muhith faced widespread criticism for his remarks against the movement of public university teachers of Bangladesh seeking a separate pay scale. He later apologized for his remarks. During this time, he justified the imposition of VAT on private university education by stating that private university students receive 1000 taka pocket money per day. This caused much uproar among the private university students. Abdul Muhith defended this decision.

== Works ==
- Abdul Muhith, Abul Maal (1978). Bangladesh, emergence of a nation. Bangladesh Books International. OCLC 5680759.
- — (1981). Thoughts on development administration. Sabia Muhith. OCLC 11969817.
- — (1996). American response to Bangladesh liberation war. The University Press Limited. ISBN 978-984-05-1361-1.
- — (1999). Bangladesh in the twenty-first century: towards an industrial society. The University Press Limited. ISBN 978-984-05-1446-5.
- — (2001). Issues of governance in Bangladesh. Mowla Brothers. OCLC 47630531.
- — (2008). State language movement in East Bengal: 1947 - 1956. The University Press Limited. ISBN 978-984-05-1795-4.
- — (2016). History of Bangladesh: a subcontinental civilisation. The University Press Limited. ISBN 978-984-8815-24-3.
