= Minister of Industries (Bangladesh) =

Minister of Industries of the People's Republic of Bangladesh

People's Republic of Bangladesh Minister of Industries
- বাংলাদেশের শিল্প মন্ত্রী
- Government Seal of Bangladesh

- Flag of Bangladesh

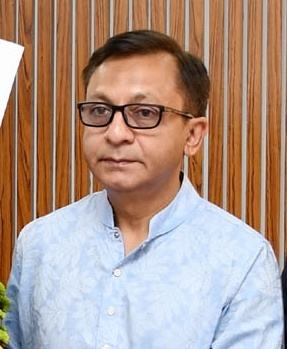
- Incumbent; Khandaker Abdul Muktadir since 17 February 2026
- Ministry of Industries
- Style: The Honourable (formal); His Excellency (diplomatic)
- Type: Cabinet minister
- Status: Minister
- Member of: Cabinet
- Reports to: Prime Minister
- Seat: Bangladesh Secretariat
- Nominator: Prime Minister of Bangladesh
- Appointer: President of Bangladesh; on the advice of the Prime Minister
- Term length: Prime Minister's pleasure
- Inaugural holder: Syed Nazrul Islam
- Formation: 13 January 1972; 54 years ago
- Salary: ৳245000 (US$2,000) per month (incl. allowances)
- Website: moind.portal.gov.bd

The industries minister of Bangladesh is the minister in charge of the Ministry of Industries of the government of the People's Republic of Bangladesh. He is also the minister of all departments and agencies under the Ministry of Industries.

== List of ministers, advisers and state ministers ==
Political parties

- Bangladesh Awami League
- BaKSAL
- Bangladesh Nationalist Party
- Jatiya Party
- Bangladesh Jamaat-e-Islami
- Communist Party of Bangladesh (Marxist–Leninist) (Barua)

Other factions

- Independent
- Military

| No. | Portrait | Officeholder (birth–death) Constituency | Term of office | | | Designation | Ministry | Prime Minister/ Chief Adviser |
| No. | Portrait | Officeholder (birth–death) Constituency | From | To | Tenure | Designation | Ministry | Prime Minister/ Chief Adviser |
|---|---|---|---|---|---|---|---|---|
| 1 | | Muhammad Mansur Ali (1917–1975) | 10 April 1971 | 12 January 1972 | 277 days | Minister | Mujib I | Tajuddin Ahmad |
| 2 | | Syed Nazrul Islam (1925–1975); MP for Mymensingh-28 | 12 January 1972 | 16 March 1973 | 3 years, 13 days | Minister | Mujib II | Sheikh Mujibur Rahman |
| 2 | | Syed Nazrul Islam (1925–1975); MP for Mymensingh-28 | 16 March 1973 | 25 January 1975 | 3 years, 13 days | Minister | Mujib III | Sheikh Mujibur Rahman |
| 3 | | Abul Hasnat Muhammad Qamaruzzaman (1926–1975); MP for Rajshahi-10 | 25 January 1975 | 15 August 1975 | 202 days | Minister | Mujib IV | Muhammad Mansur Ali |
| 4 | | Nurul Islam Chowdhury (1925–1995); MP for Chittagong-11 | 20 August 1975 | 6 November 1975 | 78 days | Minister of State (Ministry Charge) | Mostaq | Vacant |
| 5 | | Ziaur Rahman (1936–1981) | 10 November 1975 | 26 November 1975 | 16 days | Deputy Chief Martial Law Administrator | Sayem | Vacant |
| 6 | | Mirza Nurul Huda (1919–1991) | 26 November 1975 | 24 January 1976 | 59 days | Adviser | Sayem | Vacant |
| 7 | | AKM Hafizuddin (?–1979) | 24 January 1976 | 10 July 1977 | 1 year, 167 days | Adviser | Sayem | Vacant |
| 8 | | Jamal Uddin Ahmad (1932–2015); MP for Chittagong-4 | 29 June 1978 | 27 November 1981 | 3 years, 151 days | Deputy Prime Minister | Zia | Mashiur Rahman (Senior Minister) |
| 9 | | Mirza Nurul Huda (1919–1991) | 27 November 1981 | 27 February 1982 | 92 days | Vice President | Sattar | Shah Azizur Rahman |
| 10 | | Muhammad Yusuf Ali (1923–1998) | 27 February 1982 | 27 March 1982 | 28 days | Adviser | Sattar | Shah Azizur Rahman |
| 11 | | SM Shafiul Azam (1923–1991) | 27 March 1982 | 10 December 1983 | 2 years, 66 days | Adviser | Ershad | Vacant |
| 11 | | SM Shafiul Azam (1923–1991) | 10 December 1983 | 1 June 1984 | 2 years, 66 days | Adviser | Ershad | Ataur Rahman Khan |
| 12 | | Sultan Mahmud (1942–2023) | 1 June 1984 | 9 July 1986 | 2 years, 38 days | Minister | Ershad | Vacant |
| 13 | | Moudud Ahmed (1940–2021); MP for Noakhali-1 | 9 July 1986 | 27 March 1988 | 4 years, 26 days | Deputy Prime Minister | Ershad | Mizanur Rahman Chowdhury |
| 13 | | Moudud Ahmed (1940–2021); MP for Noakhali-1 | 27 March 1988 | 12 August 1989 | 4 years, 26 days | Prime Minister | Ershad | Himself |
| 13 | | Moudud Ahmed (1940–2021); MP for Noakhali-1 | 12 August 1989 | 4 August 1990 | 4 years, 26 days | Vice President | Ershad | Kazi Zafar Ahmed |
| 14 | | M. A. Sattar (1925–2009); MP for Narayanganj-4 | 4 August 1990 | 6 December 1990 | 124 days | Minister | Ershad | Kazi Zafar Ahmed |
| 15 | | AKM Musa (?–2003) | 16 December 1990 | 15 March 1991 | 89 days | Adviser | Shahabuddin | Vacant |
| 16 | | Shamsul Islam Khan (1930–2006); MP for Manikganj-4 | 20 March 1991 | 12 September 1993 | 2 years, 176 days | Minister | Khaleda I | Khaleda Zia |
| 17 | | A. M. Zahiruddin Khan (1936–2005) | 12 September 1993 | 4 April 1995 | 1 year, 204 days | Minister | Khaleda I | Khaleda Zia |
| 18 | | Lutfor Rahman Khan Azad (born–1957); MP for Tangail-3 | 4 April 1995 (Note: Before becoming Minister of State (M/C), He was Minister of State of the same ministry from 13 September 1993 to 4 April 1995.) | 19 March 1996 | 361 days | Minister of State (Ministry Charge) | Khaleda I | Khaleda Zia |
| 18 | | Lutfor Rahman Khan Azad (born–1957); MP for Tangail-3 | 19 March 1996 | 30 March 1996 | 361 days | Minister of State (Ministry Charge) | Khaleda II | Khaleda Zia |
| 19 | | Shegufta Bakht Chaudhuri (1931–2020) | 30 March 1996 | 23 June 1996 | 85 days | Adviser | Habibur | Muhammad Habibur Rahman |
| 20 | | Tofail Ahmed (1943–2026); MP for Bhola-2 | 23 June 1996 | 15 July 2001 | 5 years, 22 days | Minister | Hasina I | Sheikh Hasina |
| 21 | | Moinul Hossain Chowdhury (1943–2010) | 15 July 2001 | 10 October 2001 | 87 days | Adviser | Latifur | Latifur Rahman |
| 22 | | M. K. Anwar (1933–2017); MP for Comilla-1 | 10 October 2001 | 22 May 2003 | 1 year, 224 days | Minister | Khaleda III | Khaleda Zia |
| 23 | | Motiur Rahman Nizami (1943–2016); MP for Pabna-1 | 22 May 2003 | 29 October 2006 | 3 years, 160 days | Minister | Khaleda III | Khaleda Zia |
| 24 | | Sultana Kamal (born–1950) | 1 November 2006 | 12 December 2006 | 41 days | Adviser | Iajuddin | Iajuddin Ahmed |
| 25 | | Moin Uddin Khan (?–?) | 12 December 2006 | 11 January 2007 | 30 days | Adviser | Iajuddin | Iajuddin Ahmed |
| 26 | | Geetiara Safya Chowdhury (born–1946) | 12 January 2007 | 8 January 2008 | 361 days | Adviser | Fakhruddin | Fakhruddin Ahmed |
| 27 | | Mahbub Jamil (born–?) | 21 January 2008 | 6 January 2009 | 351 days | Special Assistant to the Chief Adviser | Fakhruddin | Fakhruddin Ahmed |
| 28 | | Dilip Barua (born–1949) | 6 January 2009 | 21 November 2013 | 4 years, 319 days | Minister | Hasina II | Sheikh Hasina |
| – | | Omor Faruk Chowdhury (born–1960); MP for Rajshahi-1 | 13 September 2012 | 21 November 2013 | 1 year, 69 days | Minister of State | Hasina II | Sheikh Hasina |
| 29 | | Tofail Ahmed (1943–2026); MP for Bhola-2 | 21 November 2013 | 12 January 2014 | 52 days | Minister | Hasina II | Sheikh Hasina |
| 30 | | Amir Hossain Amu (born–1940); MP for Jhalokati-2 | 12 January 2014 | 7 January 2019 | 4 years, 360 days | Minister | Hasina III | Sheikh Hasina |
| 31 | | Nurul Majid Mahmud Humayun (1950–2025); MP for Narsingdi-4 | 7 January 2019 | 11 January 2024 | 5 years, 212 days | Minister | Hasina IV | Sheikh Hasina |
| 31 | | Nurul Majid Mahmud Humayun (1950–2025); MP for Narsingdi-4 | 11 January 2024 | 6 August 2024 | 5 years, 212 days | Minister | Hasina V | Sheikh Hasina |
| 32 | | Adilur Rahman Khan (born–1961) | 9 August 2024 | 17 February 2026 | 2 years, 8 days | Adviser | Yunus | Muhammad Yunus |
| 33 | | Khandaker Abdul Muktadir (born–1969); MP for Sylhet-1 | 17 February 2026 | Incumbent | 242 days | Minister | Tarique | Tarique Rahman |
