= Shahla Khatun =

- শাহলা খাতুন

Personal details
- Born: Sylhet, Bangladesh
- Parents: Abu Ahmad Abdul Hafiz (father); Syeda Shahar Banu (mother)
- Relatives: AM Abdul Muhith (brother); AK Abdul Momen (brother); Abdul Hamid (granduncle)
- Education: Dhaka Medical College

Shahla Khatun FCPS FRCOG (Bengali: শাহলা খাতুন) is a Bangladeshi physician and former National Professor.

== Early life and family ==
Khatun was born into a Bengali Muslim political family in Sylhet. Her father, Abu Ahmad Abdul Hafiz, a lawyer by profession, was one of the founders of the Sylhet branch of the All-India Muslim League and took part in the Pakistan Movement. Her mother, Syeda Shahar Banu, was one of the leading women of the Bengali language movement. She has thirteen siblings including AM Abdul Muhith, a former Finance Minister of Bangladesh, and AK Abdul Momen, the country's incumbent Minister of Foreign Affairs.

== Career ==
Khatun is a gynecologist. She has served IPGMR, currently Bangladesh Medical University as a professor and head of department, Department of Obstetrics and Gynecology. She also serves at Green Life Hospital as a Gynecologist and Obstetrician. She was inducted as a National Professor by the government of Bangladesh in 2011. She also taught at the Bangladesh Medical College.
