= Abdul Hamid (politician, born 1886) =

Bengali lawyer and politician 1886–1963

Advocate Abdul Hamid

Education Minister of Assam
- In office 1929–1937

Member of the Assam Legislative Council
- In office 1924–1937
- Preceded by: Post established
- Succeeded by: Moulvi Abdus Salam

Education Minister of East Bengal
- In office 1947–1954

Personal details
- Born: 1886 Pathantula, Sylhet
- Died: 1963 (aged 76–77)
- Party: All-India Muslim League
- Relations: Shafquat Hamid (Elder Son); Khurshid Hamid (Son); Shawquat Jahan (Daughter); Nuzhat Jahan (Daughter); Ulfat Jahan (Daughter); Rafiqa Hamid (Granddaughter) shafiqa Hamid (Granddaughter); Syeda Shahar Banu (niece-in-law); Abul Maal Abdul Muhith (grandson); AK Abdul Momen (grandson); Shahla Khatun (granddaughter)

Abdul Hamid (Bengali: আব্দুল হামিদ, 1886–1963), popularly known as Minister Abdul Hamid, was a Bengali lawyer, educationist and politician. He was a former president and education minister of the Assam Legislative Council. From 1947 to 1954, he served as the education minister of East Bengal.

== Early life and education ==
Abdul Hamid was born in 1886, to a Bengali Muslim family from Pathantula in Sylhet. His father was Abdul Qadir, brother of Moulvi Abdul Karim. His sister, Hafiza Banu, was the mother of politician Abu Ahmad Abdul Hafiz and the paternal grandmother of Bangladeshi ministers Abul Maal Abdul Muhith, AK Abdul Momen and National Professor Dr. Shahla Khatun.

Abdul Hamid attended the Calcutta Madrassa. He received his Bachelor of Arts degree from Dacca College and a Bachelor of Laws from Calcutta Law College, after which he joined the Sylhet District Bar.

== Career ==
He was a former president and education minister of the Assam Legislative Council from 1924 to 1937. Qazi Nazrul Islam visited Abdul Hamid's home during his stay in Sylhet. In 1937, he was appointed as the deputy leader of the Assam Provincial Muslim League until the Partition of India in 1947. From 1947 to 1954, he served as the education minister of East Bengal.

== Death and legacy ==
Abdul Hamid died in 1963. The Minister Abdul Hamid Road in Pathantula, Sylhet as well as the Abdul Hamid Government Primary School in the nearby Masimpur, Sylhet are named after him.
