= Khandaker Abdul Muktadir =

Bangladeshi politician

Khandakar Abdul Muktadir
- খন্দকার আব্দুল মুক্তাদির
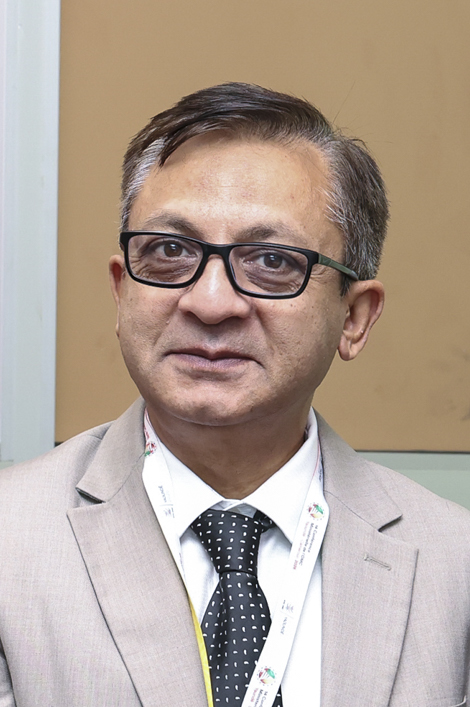
- Muktadir in 2026

Minister of Commerce
- Incumbent
- Assumed office 17 February 2026
- Prime Minister: Tarique Rahman
- Preceded by: Sheikh Bashir Uddin

Minister of Textiles and Jute
- Incumbent
- Assumed office 17 February 2026
- Prime Minister: Tarique Rahman
- Preceded by: Sheikh Bashir Uddin

Minister of Industries
- Incumbent
- Assumed office 17 February 2026
- Prime Minister: Tarique Rahman
- Preceded by: Adilur Rahman Khan

Member of Parliament
- Incumbent
- Assumed office 17 February 2026
- Preceded by: AK Abdul Momen
- Constituency: Sylhet-1

Personal details
- Born: 25 September 1969 (age 57) Sylhet, East Pakistan (now Bangladesh)
- Party: Bangladesh Nationalist Party
- Spouse: Jakiya Yeasmin
- Parent: Khandaker Abdul Malik
- Education: National University North South University

Khandakar Abdul Muktadir (born 25 September 1969) is a Bangladeshi politician and a senior leader of the Bangladesh Nationalist Party. He is the incumbent minister of industries, minister of commerce, and minister of textiles and jute. He is widely recognized for his role as an advisor to the party's chairperson. He is a member of parliament.

== Early life and education ==
Muktadir was born on 25 September 1969 in Ahmadpur village of Tetli Union, Dakshin Surma Upazila, Sylhet District. His father, Khandaker Abdul Malik, was a politician of the Bangladesh Nationalist Party (BNP) and served as a three-time Jatiya Sangsad member from the then Sylhet-8 and Sylhet-1 constituencies.

He began his education at Sylhet Blue Bird School and College, where he studied up to class six. He later passed his Secondary School Certificate (SSC) from Sylhet Cadet College and his Higher Secondary Certificate (HSC) from Dhaka City College. He obtained a Master of Social Science (MSS) in political science from the National University and later earned a Master of Business Administration (MBA) from North South University.

== Political career ==
Muktadir entered politics in 2011 by joining the Bangladesh Nationalist Party (BNP). Since 2016, he has been serving as an advisor to the BNP chairperson.

In the 11th National Parliament election in 2018, he contested from the Sylhet-1 constituency as a BNP candidate but was defeated.

In the 13th national parliament election in 2026, he was elected as a member of parliament for the first time from the Sylhet-1 constituency as a candidate of BNP.

Since 17 February 2026, he has been serving as the minister of industries, the minister of commerce, and the minister of textiles and jute in the cabinet of Tarique Rahman.
