= Sundari Mohan Das =

Indian independence activist, doctor and social worker

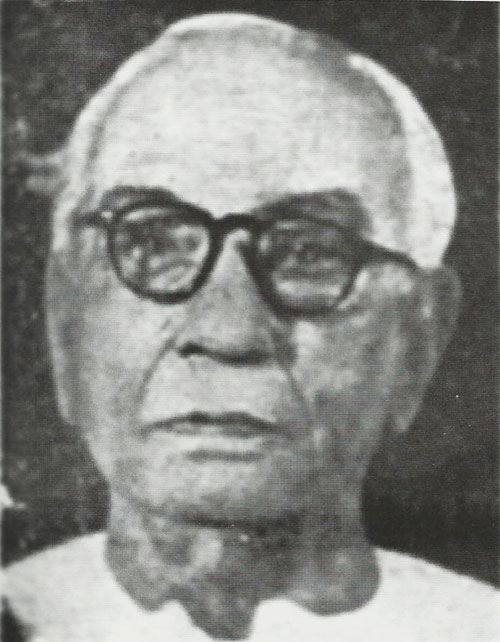
- Born: 17 December 1857; Dighli, Sylhet district, British India (now in Bangladesh)
- Died: 4 April 1950 (aged 92); Calcutta, West Bengal, India
- Education: Sylhet Government Pilot High School; F.A Presidency College; M.B. Calcutta Medical College
- Spouse: Hemangini Das

Sundari Mohan Das (17 December 1857 – 4 April 1950) was the founder principal of the Calcutta National Medical College, in Calcutta, India. He was born in Sylhet on 17 December 1857. He took his M.D. degree from Calcutta Medical College. Formerly he was Principle Emeritus of the National Medical Institute and Chittaranjan Hospital, Calcutta; President of the Indian Medical Association, Bengal Branch; Chairman of the Standing Health Committee; Calcutta Corporation; Chairman Nursing and Mandatory Examination Board; Chairman Eden.... committee Nursing Council's Bengal; Chairman Board Of Directors Universal Drug House Pvt. Ltd. A marble statue of Dr. Sundari Mohan Das was unveiled by Dr. Bidhan Chandra Roy, Chief Minister of West Bengal on 15 January 1956 at Calcutta National Medical College

== Birth ==
The paternal home of Late Dr. Sundarimohon Das was in the village of Dighli, in the Sylhet District, now in Bangladesh. He was born in Sylhet on 17 December 1857. It was the time when the first war of Independence against British Rule - the Sepoy Mutiny- was raising its head all through India. He was born on the very day when the mutiny broke out at Latu, a village on the Eastern Border area of the district of Sylhet, then under British occupation.

On getting the news of the mutiny at Latu, many families started on evacuation from Sylhet town by boat and Sundarimohan's mother, who was in her sixth month of pregnancy, was also among the evacuees. Sundarimohan was born on one of such boats before the mature time. The newborn baby was so delicate that he had to be put in a cotton basket and there was great doubt whether the child would survive long.

His father Swarup Chandra Das (also known as Dewan Swarup Chand) had been serving as a Dewan in the Sylhet Collectorate which at that time was under Dacca Commissariat. Later Swarup Chandra was promoted and transferred to Calcutta as Head Dewan of Kalighat. Gabindapur and Sutanuit which were, during that period, under East India Company.

== Education ==
Sundarimohan's school education started in Sylhet. He passed the entrance examination from the Sylhet Government Pilot High School. After passing his examination Sundarimohan came to Calcutta (modern Kolkata) to prosecute his further studies. He passed his F.A. Examination from the Presidency College. He took his M.B. degree from the Calcutta Medical College. He was a good scholar all through his educational career and earned scholarship starting from the lowest school stage up to the stage in the Calcutta medical college.

== Student life and public work ==
While he was a student in the medical college he became a member of the Chaitra Mela, later termed Hindu or National Mela, founded as the Indian Olympic for physical training.

== Several friends and their vows ==
The great orator and National leader Bipin Chandra Pal, poet Ananda Chandra Mitra and Sundarimohan Das, all hailing from Sylhet, were great friends. All four had come under the influence of Sivanath Sastri and became Brahmos. It was again under his influence that these four friends along with others as far back as 1876, took some vows signing their names with their own blood that:

- "Self-rule (Swaraj) is our birth-right and we must not serve under foreigner (i.e. the British)."
- "We shall accumulate no personal wealth and spend all the balance after meeting necessary expenses for the service of the country and the people."
- "We shall not Co-operate with the British administration and the country and the people."
- "We shall marry widows to show that widows have right to marry."
- "We shall not buy or use foreign goods."

All of them remained true to their vows up to the last days of their lives.

== Service and social work in Sylhet ==
After passing his M.B. examination Sundarimohan went to Sylhet as a private practitioner, but he could not be satisfied with this limited sphere of activities. During his short period of stay in Sylhet, he took the lead in establishing a Brahmos samaj there in co-operation with some of the liberal minded citizens of Sylhet town. For his double defiance - his widow marriage and starting of Brahmos samaj – he was driven out his paternal home.

While in Sylhet, he extensively toured the rural areas of the district. The total lack of female education, the widespread prevalence of all of sorts of superstition among the people and the horrible condition of child delivery then prevailing in society moved him to the core of his heart. With like minded people he started opening a girls' school, and started a campaign against all sorts of corruptions and superstitions and for the improvement of maternity services. It was his experiences gathered mainly in the rural areas of his district that supplied him the materials and provided him with the basis for writing his famous book in easy Bengali, Briddha Dhatri Rojnamcha (Diary of an old midwife).

== Service in Calcutta ==
Coming back to Calcutta, Sundarimohan joined the Calcutta Municipal corporation as a health inspector. At the time of his service under Calcutta corporation, plague broke out in the city and as a preventive measure, he ordered for destroying some stocks of sugar and salt owned by a few British firms. On this issue he came into conflict with the chairman of the corporation, who was British. The chairman asked him to resign and he resigned at once, refusing to compromise with what he felt to be wrong.

It was about the same period that his book Municipal Darpan was written and published. It was written in simple Bengali, in a dialogue form for educating the citizen of Calcutta on matters relating to public health.

== Swadeshi Movement (1905) ==
Sundarimohan had been one of the leaders in the great Swadeshi Movement of Bengali (1905-1910). He had composed a number of inspiring songs on the boycotting of British goods and British education, etc. He led processions on such issues and took an active part in organising "National Education", particularly on technical and medical lines. He was the main organiser of the National Council of Education and one of the founder-members of Bengali Technical Institute (present-day Jadavpur University).

== Swadesh industry ==
The Swadeshi Movement was not just a negative movement to Sundarimohan. He keenly felt that unless the British goods could be replaced by Swadeshi goods through organising Swadeshi industrial production, this movement could not be successful. It was a fond dream of Sundarimohan that India must be made self-sufficient in industrial products. He had imported knitting machineries for the production of hosiery goods at his Sukea Street house where he trained unemployed youths on this line. It was the twenty five thousand (i.e. over Rs.1,25,000/- in today's rupee value) for the project. As a doctor, he keenly felt the dependence of the country on foreign medicines imported from foreign countries. He set about fighting against this dependence by establishing indigenous pharmaceutical industry in India. He knew the Ayurvedic system of medicine and read Charka and Susruta. His aim was to produce medicines from the various rich herbs available in India in vast quantities, applying modern scientific processes, and also from the modern chemical ingredients. With this purpose in view, he sent his son late Premaananda Das to America in 1908, for studying Pharmaceutical Chemistry. Premananda came back to India after 5 years training and obtaining the degrees M.S. (Master Of Science) and Ph.C. (Pharmaceutical Chemistry) (first in India) from Michigan; also a diploma in Bacteriology and Business Administration from Harvard University acquired practical experiences in big pharmaceutical works in Europe and America.

== Logistical support during Swadeshi movement ==
Das was a committed participant in the Indian independence movement, becoming a prominent figure during the Swadeshi movement. Beyond public activism, he provided logistical support to revolutionary groups in Bengal. His Calcutta residence served as a site for the manufacturing of explosives. Notably, the revolutionary Ullaskar Dutta spent a significant time at Das' home. Additionally, other associates, such as Radhakisore Sharma, were also involved in making bombs at his home, though Sharma eventually evaded arrest by relocating to Brindaban. Das frequently provided refuge to revolutionaries evading police and provided financial contributions to their cause.

During the same period, leaders of the nationalist movement in Calcutta, including Aurobindo Ghosh, Chittaranjan Das, Shyamsundar Chakraborty, Brahmabandhav Upadhyay, Liakat Hussain, and others, regularly met at Das's residence at 73 Sukea Street under the leadership of Bipin Chandra Pal to discuss the nationalist movement and the goal of Swaraj. The Swaraj Samity was first established at his residence. The organization has been described as a precursor to the Swarajya Party later founded by Chittaranjan Das.

During the Non-Cooperation Movement initiated by Mahatma Gandhi, Das also participated in organizing student strikes, including the medical students' strike in Calcutta. His role in the organization of the strike is discussed in a later section.

== Role in "Swaraj" Corporation ==
In 1924 when Deshbandhu chittaranjan Das became the first elected mayor of newly formed Calcutta Corporation on being requested by him, Sundarimohan became the Chairman of public health Committee of the corporation. His contributions in Public Health measures may be summarised as follows:- a) Liberal financial and other aids to non-governmental medical institutions and hospitals. Such ids were formerly almost limited to government hospitals and institutions. b) Formation of public health associations in every ward with the citizens' representatives, for the first time. c) Opening of medical centres in different parts the city. d) Provision for junior nurses training with purposes of widening the scope of nurse training for the poorer sections. e) Appointment of trained "dhais" for attending the maternity cases, going from house to house and setting up of Maternity Homes in different parts of the city. f) First inception of co-operatives supply of pure milk at cheaper rates children and hospital patients.

== Main sphere of activities ==
His main sphere of activities gradually veered round in organisation independent medical institutions and hospitals, free from government control, for the service of the common people, though he remained connected with other social and political activities all through his life.

It was under his advice and inspiration that Chittaranjan Seva Sadan came into being and Dr. Sundarimohan Das was its first superintendent.

He gave co-operative and active help when Dr. Radha Gobinda Kar started the R.G. Kar medical school in the days of the Swadesi Movement. He served the institution as an honorary teacher but severed his connection with it when it was taken over by the government. When the famous Kabiraj Shyamadas Bachaspati set up "Baidyasastra Pathi", Sundarimohan extended his helping hand there also. While Kabiraj Bachaspati was the principal of the Ayurvedic section, Sundarimahan was the principal of the allopathic section of the institution. He advocated independent research in Ayurveda on scientific lines and established the National Medical Institute. In the wake of the Non-Cooperation movement, when the students of the Calcutta Medical College boycotted the institution and demanded an alternative non-government arrangement for their studies. It was Sundarimohan who came forward with the assurance that he would undertake this task leading to the National Medical Institute beginning to take shape in Calcutta. He was aided in this work by Dr. K. S. Roy and Dr. SR. C. Sengupta. Sundarimohan gave up his lucrative private practice, so that he might devote his whole time and energy to his new institution. He served as the Principal of this institution without taking any remuneration except conveyance expenses. The National Medical Institute became the Calcutta National Medical College — one of the foremost medical institutions of the country.

It was in the hospital of the National Medical Institute that Sundarimohan died on 4 April 1950. He had expressed his wish before his death that after his death, his body would be the property of his students and it would be utilised for teaching them dissection and anatomy. The hospital authorities, however, could not fulfil his last wish.

== Composition ==
Sundari Mohan Das had also started composing songs during Swadeshi Movement Period. Altogether, he composed about 300 songs. Rabindranath Tagore, while coming and staying in Calcutta, would visit Sundari Mohan's place at least twice or thrice a week to hear his devotional songs (mostly "Kirtans"). He was a regular writer mainly on the subject of public health affairs. His books "Saral Dharti Siksha & Susra Bidya" written in easy Bengali for junior nurse training and midwife training reared a generation of Nurse and Midwife in Bengal, Assam, and Orissa, providing the helpless girls and widows from the middle class and backward poor families with opportunity of employment and honourable life social services. His last great literary works was his unpublished autobiography.
