= Odhikar =

Human rights organisation

- অধিকার
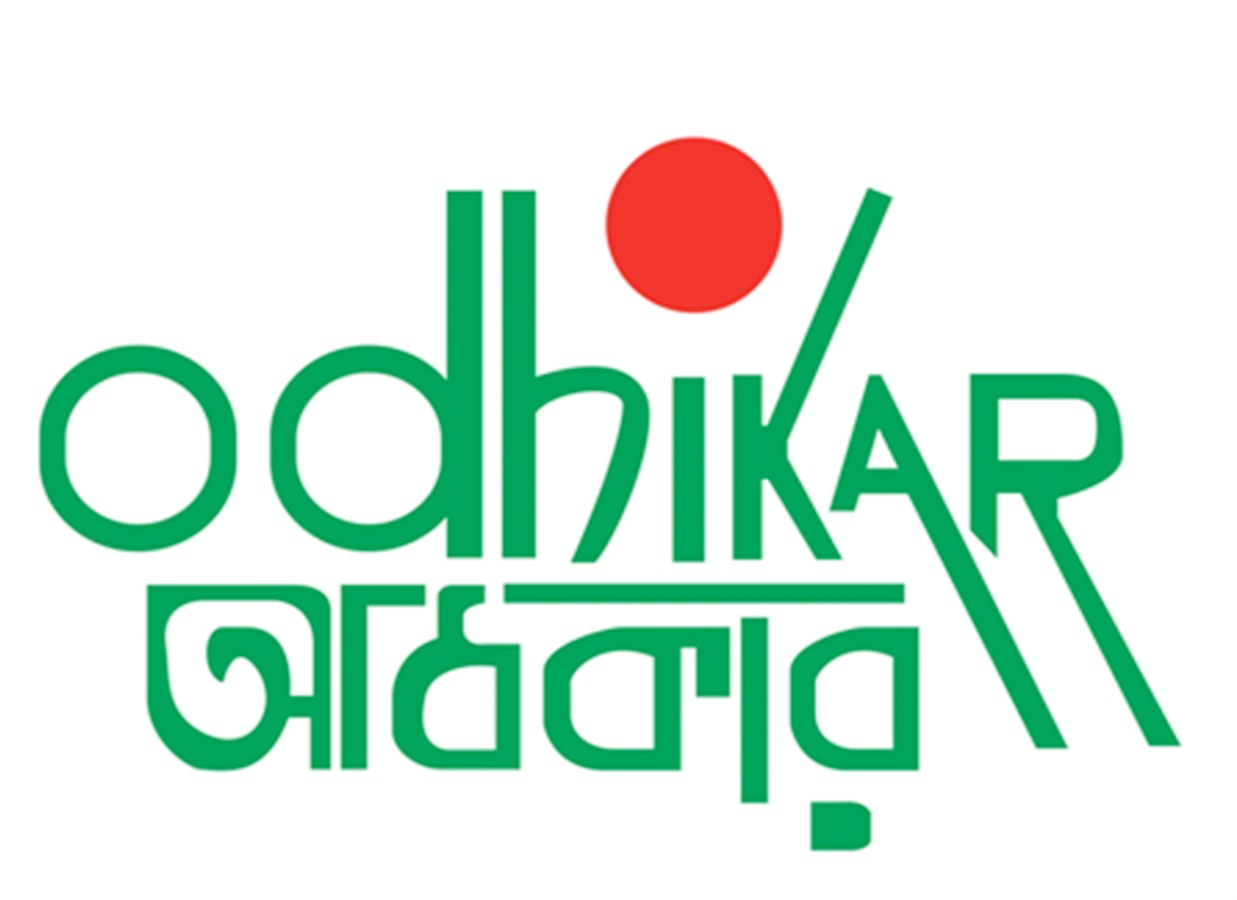
- Formation: October 1994
- Type: Human rights NGO
- Purpose: Human rights
- Location: Bangladesh
- Method: Promote human rights through awareness building, documentation, fact finding, monitoring and research
- Secretary General: Adilur Rahman Khan
- Leader: ASM Nasiruddin Elan
- Affiliations: FORUM-ASIA; FIDH
- Website: odhikar.org

Odhikar (Bengali: অধিকার) is a Bangladesh-based human rights organization, that was founded in October 1994. It is a member of the International Federation for Human Rights (FIDH). It has been publishing an annual activity report since 2003. Odhikar's work has been cited by Human Rights Watch in their 2011 World Report on Bangladesh. The goal for establishing Odhikar was to develop human rights alertness and observing violations in Bangladesh. Notable members of Odhikar include Adilur Rahman Khan, ASM Nasiruddin Elan and Shampa Goswami.

== Important works ==
=== Publication of border death count ===
Odhikar published annual list of deaths along the Bangladesh–India border, raising anger from the pro-India government.

== 2013 Shapla Square protests ==
On 10 June 2013, Odhikar published a fact finding report on the 2013 Operation at Motijheel Shapla Chattar claiming 61 deaths, but refused to provide any names of the victims report, citing security concerns for the families of the victims. On 19 August 2024, they published the name of the deceased on their verified Facebook page.

== 2018 revocation of observer status ==
On 11 November 2018, the pro-government newspaper Janakantha published an article written by Bibhash Baroi, which Odhikar called slanderous. International Federation for Human Rights condemned the article saying:

The Observatory condemns in the strongest terms the politically-motivated attacks and accusations against Odhikar, which manifestly aim at discrediting its reputation and hindering its peaceful and legitimate human rights activities.

In November 2018, the Election Commission in Bangladesh annulled Odhikar's right to observe elections.

== 2022 deregistration ==
In 2014, Odhikar applied to renew its registration as a non-governmental organisation. After delaying processing the application for years, on 5 June 2022 the NGO Affairs Bureau of the Bangladeshi government officially denied the application, stating that Odhikar's publications had "seriously tarnished the image of [Bangladesh] to the world".

== 2023 arrest of leaders ==
In September 2023, Odhikar's secretary, Adilur Rahman Khan, and director, ASM Nasiruddin Elan, were arrested and sentenced to two years in prison, as well as a fine, by the Cyber Tribunal of Dhaka. Human Rights Watch has called the charges "retaliation" for Odhikar's documentation of human rights violations in Bangladesh. The arrest was in relation to reporting the number of fatalities in a 2013 police operation at 61, far higher than government figure of 13.
