= Syeda Shahar Banu =

Bangladeshi politician and women's rights activist

- সৈয়দা শাহার বানু
- Born: 1914; Jagannathpur, Assam, British Raj
- Died: 21 October 1983 (aged 68–69); Sylhet, Bangladesh
- Occupation: Politician
- Known for: Bengali language movement
- Spouse: Abu Ahmad Abdul Hafiz
- Children: 5, including Abul Maal Abdul Muhith, AK Abdul Momen, and Shahla Khatun
- Relatives: Abdul Hamid (uncle-in-law)

Syeda Shahar Banu (Bengali: সৈয়দা শাহার বানু; 1914–1983) was a leader of the Bengali language movement and pioneer of the women's rights movement in Sylhet. She also played an important role in the lead-up to the 1947 Sylhet referendum and the establishment of Sylhet Government Women's College.

== Early life and family ==
Syeda Shahar Banu Chowdhury was born in 1914 in the village of Syedpur in Jagannathpur, Sunamganj subdivision (now in Bangladesh). Her father, Syed Abul Bashar Chowdhury, was the son of mystic poet Syed Ashhar Ali Chowdhury, and the grandson of zamindar Dewan Syed Ajmal Ali Chowdhury. The family inherited the titles from ancestor Dewan Syed Wasil Ali Chowdhury, who was appointed the Sadar-e-Ala and dewan in the Nawabi period.

== Social and political activism ==
Shahar Banu's entrance into social activism was inspired by her husband, Abu Ahmad Abdul Hafiz, who was a politician and advocate. She contributed in the establishment of the Sylhet Women's Muslim League, a branch of the All-India Muslim League, and served as its co-chairwoman from 1945 to 1948. She later became the president of the Sylhet Women's Association.

Shahar Banu was the first female Muslim MP at the Assam Legislative Council. In the lead up to the 1947 Sylhet referendum, she travelled across many homes organising the women. At the same time, she had to work at risk, ignoring the strong constraints of the conservative society and the Indian National Congress. She was also linked with the Sylhet Government Women's College from the very beginning. When the college was about to close in 1950, she tried her best to keep it alive. She used to inspire girls to get education. She went from house to house to get the metric-passed girls admitted to college.

== Language activism ==
As early as 1947, Shahar Banu took part in the Bengali language movement. A memorandum was handed over to Khawaja Nazimuddin, erstwhile chief minister of East Bengal, by the women of Sylhet District demanding to make Bengali the state language. Shahar Banu Chowdhury was one of the initiators and signatories of this historic memorandum. She was one of the leaders in all the movements for language in Sylhet. Along with Zobeda Khanom Chowdhury, another language activist, and others, they were prosecuted by various pro-Pakistani quarters for their struggle for language rights. They were subjected to various social stigmas, ranging from slander in newspapers.

== Death and legacy ==
Syeda Shahar Banu died on 21 October 1983. She had several children with her husband Abu Ahmad Abdul Hafiz, such as Abu Ahmad Abdul Muhsi, Abul Maal Abdul Muhith (former finance minister of Bangladesh), AK Abdul Mubin, AK Abdul Momen (incumbent minister of foreign affairs for Bangladesh) and Shahla Khatun.

== See also ==
- Karimunnesa Khanam Chaudhurani
- Rawshan Ara Bachchu
