= Khandaker Abdul Malik =

Bangladeshi politician

- খন্দকার আব্দুল মালিক

Member of Parliament
- In office 5 March 1991 – 30 March 1996
- Preceded by: Humayun Rashid Chowdhury
- Succeeded by: Humayun Rashid Chowdhury
- Constituency: Sylhet-1
- In office 2 April 1979 – 24 March 1982
- Preceded by: Dewan Farid Gazi
- Succeeded by: Constituency dissolved
- Constituency: Sylhet-8

Personal details
- Born: 1920 Sylhet, Assam Province
- Died: 2004 (aged 83–84)
- Party: Bangladesh Nationalist Party
- Children: 5 including Khandaker Abdul Muktadir

Khandaker Abdul Malik (1920 – 2004) was a Bangladeshi politician. He was a three-time elected member of parliament from the prestigious Sylhet-1 and Sylhet-8 seat from the Bangladesh Nationalist Party's in the second national parliament elections of 1979, the fifth parliamentary elections of 1991 and the sixth parliamentary elections of 15 February 1996, Sylhet-1.

== Birth and early life ==
Khandaker Abdul Malik was born in the village of Ahmedpur of South Surma's Tetli Union in 1920.

== Political life ==
One of the founders of the Bangladesh Nationalist Party is Khandaker Abdul Malik. Sylhet BNP seeds are sown by his hand. He was elected as an MP in Sylhet-1 constituency on 1979, 1991 and 15 February 1996.

== Family life ==
His youngest son, Khandaker Abdul Muktadir, is BNP chairperson's adviser. He was a candidate from Sylhet-1 for the Jatiya Oikya Front for the BNP in the Jatiya Sangsad election of 2018 election., and election of 2026 election, and is the current Cabinet Minister for Ministry of Commerce, Ministry of Industries, & Ministry of Textiles and Jute.

== Death ==
Khandaker Abdul Malik died in 2004.
