= Adilur Rahman Khan =

Bangladeshi political adviser

- আদিলুর রহমান খান
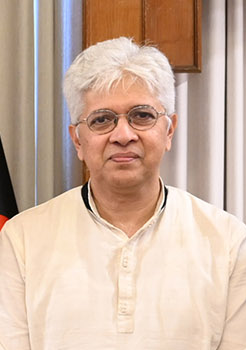
- Khan in 2025

Adviser for Industries
- In office 9 August 2024 – 17 February 2026
- President: Mohammed Shahabuddin
- Chief Adviser: Muhammad Yunus
- Preceded by: Nurul Majid Mahmud Humayun
- Succeeded by: Khandaker Abdul Muktadir

Adviser for Housing and Public Works
- In office 16 August 2024 – 17 February 2026
- President: Mohammed Shahabuddin
- Chief Adviser: Muhammad Yunus
- Preceded by: R. A. M. Obaidul Muktadir Chowdhury
- Succeeded by: Zakaria Taher Sumon

Adviser for Local Government, Rural Development, and Co-operatives
- In office 11 December 2025 – 17 February 2026
- President: Mohammed Shahabuddin
- Chief Adviser: Muhammad Yunus
- Preceded by: Asif Mahmud
- Succeeded by: Mirza Fakhrul Islam Alamgir

Personal details
- Born: 2 July 1961 (age 65) Munshiganj, East Pakistan, Pakistan
- Education: University of Dhaka; Vrije Universiteit Brussel
- Occupation: Human rights activist lawyer
- Awards: Robert F. Kennedy Human Rights Award (2014); Gwangju Prize for Human Rights (2014)

Adilur Rahman Khan (born 2 July 1961 in Munshiganj or Bikrampur) is a human rights activist and the founder of Odhikar, a human rights organisation. He is a lawyer and former deputy attorney general for Bangladesh. Since October 2022, Adilur Rahman Khan has been one of the secretaries general of the International Federation for Human Rights (FIDH). He was an adviser to the interim government of Bangladesh.

== Early life ==
Khan studied law at the University of Dhaka. He was part of the democratic movement against Lieutenant General Hussain Muhammad Ershad. He earned his two master's degrees in law from the University of Dhaka and Vrije Universiteit Brussel.

== Career ==
Khan and several other members of civil society founded the human rights organisation Odhikar on 10 October 1994.

Khan is a former deputy attorney general of Bangladesh. In December 2005, he represented the government of Bangladesh in a ruling where the High Court asked the government to explain its failure to protect the judiciary bomb attacks by Islamist militants. He resigned from the post on 14 May 2007.

In 2013, a case was filed against Khan for 'spreading confusion' about the death toll in the operation to remove Hefazat-e-Islam Bangladesh, an Islamist organization, leaders and activists during the 2013 Shapla Square protests in Dhaka. On 10 August 2013, at 10:30 pm, Khan was detained by the Detective Branch. He was detained under Section 54 of the Information and Communication Technology Act, 2006 and denied division in jail. Canada called for his release through their high commissioner in Dhaka, Heather Cruden. Numerous human rights activists in Bangladesh called for his release. Dipu Moni, the minister of foreign affairs, provided a briefing to diplomats in Bangladesh. Justice Salma Masud Chowdhury and Justice Zafar Ahmed of the High Court Division asked the government to provide division status in jail to Khan in September 2013. In October 2013, he was released from jail after securing bail from Justice Borhanuddin and Justice KM Kamrul Kader of the High Court Division. In January 2014, Khan and Odhikar's director ASM Nasiruddin Elan, were indicted in case filed over its report on the 2013 protests.

In 2014 he won the Robert F. Kennedy Human Rights Award, created to honour individuals around the world who have shown great courage and have made a significant contribution to human rights in their country. The same year, he also won the Gwangju Prize for Human Rights, an award that recognises "individuals, groups or institutions in Korea and abroad that have contributed in promoting and advancing human rights, democracy and peace through their work." Also in 2014, he was a finalist for the Martin Ennals Award for Human Rights Defenders.

Khan was detained in Kuala Lumpur International Airport by Malaysian Immigration in July 2017. He was deported back to Bangladesh the next day.

In September 2023, Khan and Nasiruddin Elan were sentenced to two years in prison and fined 10,000 taka by the Cyber Tribunal of Dhaka in a case filed over inflating the death toll from the 2013 Shapla Square protests and government action to remove the protestors. France and Germany expressed regret over the verdict. Bangladesh Jatiotabadi Ainjibi Forum, a lawyers body aligned with the Bangladesh Nationalist Party, protested the verdict. Shortly before heading to court for the verdict, Adilur Rahman Khan told Netra News that he believed they should have been acquitted, emphasizing that their work was solely for the cause of human rights and justice. He stated that even if imprisoned, they would continue their human rights efforts upon release. Khan explained that Odhikar initially withheld the names of victims out of concern for their families' safety, as they feared retaliation from the authorities. He underscored that Odhikar's role was not only to investigate and document but also to protect the victims and their families.

== Awards ==
- Robert F. Kennedy Human Rights Award (2014)
- Gwangju Prize for Human Rights (2014)
- International Bar Association (IBA) Human Rights Award
- Martin Ennals Award Finalist 2014.
- Franco-German Human Rights Prize-2017
