= Bhabani Prasad Singha =

Bangladeshi jurist

The Honourable Justice Bhabani Prasad Singha
- ভবানী প্রসাদ সিংহ

High Court Division of Bangladesh
- Incumbent
- Assumed office 12 December 2010.

Personal details
- Born: August 8, 1953 (age 72)
- Children: Sumit Sinha (son)
- Parent(s): Late Sudhir Chandra Singha (father); Late Brishabhanu Rajkumari (mother)
- Profession: Judge

Bhabani Prasad Singha (born 8 August 1953) is a Bangladeshi justice of the High Court Division. He was appointed in 2010.

== Early life ==
Singha was born on 8 August 1953 in Sylhet, East Bengal, Pakistan.

== Career ==
Singha joined the district court as an advocate on 3 March 1979.

On 4 April 1983, Singha was appointed a district munsif.

Singha became a district and sessions judge on 24 February 2000.

On 12 December 2010, Singha was appointed to the High Court Division of the Supreme Court. He became a permanent judge of the High Court Division 12 December 2012. He is also the dean of the law department at Premier University.

Singha retired in July 2020.
