= Md. Nuruzzaman =

Bangladeshi Judge

Justice of the Appellate Division of Bangladesh

Personal details
- Profession: Judge

Md. Nuruzzaman is a justice in the Appellate Division of Bangladesh Supreme Court.

== Early life ==
Md. Nuruzzaman was born on 1 July 1956.

== Career ==
Md. Nuruzzaman was in the Mukti Bahini and fought in the Bangladesh Liberation war in 1971.

Md. Nuruzzaman started working as a lawyer on 4 September 1983.

In 1987, Md. Nuruzzaman became an advocate in the Bangladesh High Court Division of Supreme Court of Bangladesh.

On 30 June 2009, Md. Nuruzzaman was appointed an Additional Judge of the High Court Division of Supreme Court of Bangladesh. He became a full judge of the High Court Division of Supreme Court of Bangladesh on 6 June 2011.

Md. Nuruzzaman was appointed to the Bangladesh Judicial Service Commission on 6 December 2017.

On 9 October 2018, Md. Nuruzzaman was appointed to the Appellate Division of the Supreme Court of Bangladesh. He was the chairperson of the enrollment committee of the Bangladesh Bar Council. In January 2019, he became the chamber judge of the Appellate Division several times. On 19 December 2019, he was appointed the vacation judge by the chief justice. He has been appointed as the Performing Chief Justice of Bangladesh several times.
