= Oumar Daou =

Politician and ambassador of Mali to Rwanda

Ambassador Daou at the 4th United Nations Conference on the Least Developed Countries (LDC-IV) in Istanbul, Turkey. February 2011

Oumar Daou (born 13 May 1955) is a Malian diplomat and political expert.

In 2017 appointed Ambassador Extraordinary and Plenipotentiary of Mali to Rwanda (August 2017).

From 2015 to 2017, Daou occupied the post of Secretary General of the Ministry of Foreign Affairs in Mali.

In 2008, he was appointed Permanent Representative of Mali to the United Nations. He served as President of the UNICEF Executive Board at the international level in 2009.

From 2004 to 2008, Daou was the Director of Political Affairs in the Ministry of Foreign Affairs. Before that, he was deputy director of Political Affairs in the Ministry from 2003 to 2004 and Head of the International Organizations Department from 2001 to 2003.

== Biography ==
=== Early life and education ===
Daou was born in Bamako, Mali in 1955. He is the son of Amadou Daou, former Mayor of Bamako's Municipality V and Director of Malian Post and Fanta Daou, former nurse at the Point G Hospital in Bamako. He attended the Lycee de Banankoro in Segou, continuing his education at the University of Beijing where he earned his degree in philosophy and modern history. In 1986, he received diplomatic training, including from the Cairo Institute of Diplomatic Studies in 1990 and the United Nations Institute for Training and Research (UNITAR) in 1986. In addition, he was a 1987 recipient of a United Nations Disarmament Scholarship. Mr. Daou was honoured with the award of Friendship Citizen of Nagasaki, Japan, in 1987 and the Chevalier de l’Ordre national du Mali in 2006.
