= Zobeda Khanom Chowdhury =

Bangladeshi politician

- জোবেদা খানম চৌধুরী
- Born: 1901; Jorhat, North-East Frontier, British India
- Died: 1986 (aged 84–85); Bangladesh
- Occupation: Politician
- Known for: Bengali language movement
- Spouse: Dewan Abdur Rahim Chowdhury
- Children: 9

Zobeda Khanom Chowdhury (Bengali: জোবেদা খানম চৌধুরী; 1901–1986), also known as Zobeda Rahim Chowdhury (Bengali: জোবেদা রহিম চৌধুরী), was one among the leading woman who partook in the Bengali language movement from Sylhet and a pioneering women in Bangladeshi politics.

== Early life and education ==
Zobeda Khanom was born in 1901 in Jorhat in the then North-East Frontier (now in Assam) to Khan Bahadur Sharafat Ali Chowdhury, a high-ranking British Police officer, and Nurjahan Begum. She was the second of ten children, four of whom were from her father's second marriage. The family were originally from Shilghat, Golapganj in Sylhet, but Chowdhury had moved to Assam for employment. Her education began in Dibrugarh, Assam, where her father was working at the time. She then enrolled at the Eden Mohila College in Dacca, where she became the college's first female Muslim student.

In 1928, the Sylhet Muslim Students Conference was held, which was attended by Kazi Nazrul Islam, A. K. Fazlul Huq, and Muhammad Shahidullah. Khanom first became the president of the Sylhet District Women's Congress and later left the party and became the president of the Sylhet District Women's Muslim League in 1943.

In 1919, Khanom's father arranged for her to marry Dewan Abdur Rahim Chowdhury, who was a member of the Assam Legislative Council. They had five sons and four daughters.

== Political activism ==
Chowdhury was the leader of Sylhet Womans Association.

Demanding to make Bengali the state language, the women of Sylhet district met the Minister of Communications at the beginning of the language movement in 1948 and later handed over a memorandum to the then Prime Minister of East Bengal. Here she played a leading role. After sending this memorandum, they came under pressure in various ways. At that time, the Eastern Herald, a pro-Urdu newspaper in Sylhet, in its editorial, made indecent remarks about the leader Zobeda Khanom and the memorandum. Syeda Najibunnesa Khatun, another great language activist, protested against this indecent statement.

Those that despite being Bengali-speakers of East Pakistan oppose their mother tongue are treacherous children... In what way are the non-Urdu-speaking Muslims of Sylhet inferior in observing the rules of Islam than those proficient in Urdu? On the contrary, the conscious people have expressed the view that culture and heritage deserve a prominent place among the Muslims of Sylhet in the whole of East Pakistan.

— A protest note published in the 12 March issue of the weekly Nau-Belal

Tamaddun Majlish founder Abul Kashem also sent a letter to Chowdhury, expressing the Majlish's gratitude to her activism in Sylhet and giving her a sense of hope in response to the indecent media backlash.

The Bengalis were outraged when Urdu was declared the state language of Pakistan at the Ramna Race Course Ground in Dhaka by Muhammad Ali Jinnah, the founder of Pakistan, and at the convocation ceremony of University of Dhaka on 24 March. In this time, Zobeda Khanom sent a letter to Jinnah requesting Bengali to be given status. Her son, Ahmed Kabir Chowdhury, a University of Dhaka student, also took part in the language movement. He was severely injured during a police firing at a student protest on 21 February (later recognised as International Mother Language Day). Zobeda Khanom was one of the many members of the Sylhet Regional All-Parties State Language Council.

== Death ==
Chowdhury died in Bangladesh in 1986.

== See also ==
- Syeda Shahar Banu
