= Sylhet-1 =

Constituency of Bangladesh's Jatiya Sangsad

Coordinates: 24.89°N 91.87°E

- Constituency for the Jatiya Sangsad
- District: Sylhet District
- Division: Sylhet Division
- Electorate: 680,946 (2026)

Current constituency
- Created: 1973
- Party: Bangladesh Nationalist Party
- Member: Khandaker Abdul Muktadir
- ← 228 Sunamganj-5 230 Sylhet-2 →

Sylhet-1 is a constituency represented in the Jatiya Sangsad (National Parliament) of Bangladesh since 2026 by Khandaker Abdul Muktadir of the Bangladesh Nationalist Party.

== Boundaries ==
The constituency encompasses Sylhet City Corporation and Sylhet Sadar Upazila.

== History ==
The constituency was created for the first general elections in newly independent Bangladesh, held in 1973.

Ahead of the 2008 general election, the Election Commission redrew constituency boundaries to reflect population changes revealed by the 2001 Bangladesh census. The 2008 redistricting altered the boundaries of the constituency.

== Members of Parliament ==
Election	Member	Party
1973	Abdul Hekim Chowdhury	Awami League
1979	Syed Rafiqul Haque	Bangladesh Nationalist Party
Major Boundary Changes
1986	Humayun Rashid Chowdhury	Independent
1991	Khandaker Abdul Malik	Bangladesh Nationalist Party
Feb 1996	Khandaker Abdul Malik	Bangladesh Nationalist Party
Jun 1996	Humayun Rashid Chowdhury	Awami League
2001	Saifur Rahman	Bangladesh Nationalist Party
2008	Abul Maal Abdul Muhith	Awami League
2014	Abul Maal Abdul Muhith	Awami League
2018	AK Abdul Momen	Awami League
2024	AK Abdul Momen	Awami League
2026	Khandaker Abdul Muktadir	Bangladesh Nationalist Party

== Elections ==
=== Elections in the 2020s ===
General Election 2026: Sylhet-1
Party	Candidate	Votes	%	±%
BNP	Khandaker Abdul Muktadir	176,936	55.6	N/A
Jamaat	Maulana Habibur Rahman	134,983	42.4	N/A
IAB	Mahmudul Hasan	2,701	0.8	N/A
BSD	Pranab Jyoti Pal	1,113	0.4	N/A
CPB	Mohammad Anwar Hossain	908	0.3	N/A
BSD (Marxist)	Sanjay Kanta Das	801	0.3	N/A
GOP	Akmal Hossain	314	0.1	N/A
IBB	Md. Shamim Mia	239	0.1	N/A
Majority		41,953	13.2	N/A
Turnout		317,995	46.7	N/A
BNP gain from AL				

=== Elections in the 2010s ===
General Election 2018: Sylhet-1
Party	Candidate	Votes	%	±%
AL	AK Abdul Momen	298,696		N/A
BNP	Khandaker Abdul Muktadir	123,851		N/A
IAB	Md Redwanul Haque Chowdhury	2,024		N/A
Majority		174,845		
Turnout		424,571		
Registered electors		544,244		
AL hold				

Abul Maal Abdul Muhith was re-elected unopposed in the 2014 general election after opposition parties withdrew their candidacies in a boycott of the election.

=== Elections in the 2000s ===
General Election 2008: Sylhet-1
Party	Candidate	Votes	%	±%
AL	Abul Maal Abdul Muhith	178,636	55.5	+17.5
BNP	Saifur Rahman	140,367	43.6	−9.9
BKA	Nassir Uddin	822	0.3	−0.1
BSD	Ujjal Roy	660	0.2	N/A
BIF	Md. Jalaluddin	605	0.2	N/A
Bangladesh Kalyan Party	Md. Kahir Mahmood	495	0.2	N/A
Jatiya Samajtantrik Dal-JSD	Md. Shafique	270	0.1	N/A
Majority		38,269	11.9	−3.6
Turnout		321,855	76.0	+8.1
AL gain from BNP				

General Election 2001: Sylhet-1
Party	Candidate	Votes	%	±%
BNP	Saifur Rahman	133,827	53.5	+21.3
AL	Abul Mal Abdul Muhit	95,089	38.0	+5.4
IJOF	A. Mukit Khan	17,090	6.8	N/A
Independent	Md. Chaifur Rahman	1,246	0.5	N/A
Liberal Party Bangladesh	M. Kutub Uddin Ahmad	1,159	0.5	N/A
BKA	Md. Nasir Uddin	556	0.2	N/A
Bangladesh Samajtantrik Dal (Basad-Khalekuzzaman)	Md. Humayun Khan	403	0.2	N/A
Independent	Md. Ismail Ali	298	0.1	N/A
Jatiya Janata Party (Nurul Islam)	Nurul Islam Khan	197	0.1	0.0
Independent	Mostafa Allama	190	0.1	N/A
JSD	Siddiqur Rahman	186	0.1	−0.4
Jatiya Party (M)	Eftekhar Ahmad Limon	83	0.0	N/A
Majority		38,738	15.5	+15.1
Turnout		250,324	67.9	+1.3
BNP gain from AL				

=== Elections in the 1990s ===
General Election June 1996: Sylhet-1
Party	Candidate	Votes	%	±%
AL	Humayun Rashid Chowdhury	59,710	32.6	+2.3
BNP	Saifur Rahman	58,990	32.2	+0.5
JP(E)	Babrul Hossain Babul	40,175	21.9	N/A
Jamaat	Shafiqur Rahman	18,029	9.8	−5.2
Jamiat Ulema-e-Islam Bangladesh	Rezaul Karim Kashemi	1,293	0.7	N/A
Jatiya Samajtantrik Dal-JSD	Mohammad Shafiq	1,122	0.6	N/A
JSD	Shamima Akhtar	1,005	0.5	−6.2
IOJ	Abdur Rakib	785	0.4	−6.2
Independent	Md. Habibur Rahman Moin	459	0.3	N/A
Zaker Party	M. A. Karim	337	0.2	−0.2
Independent	Ruhela Hussain Rina	327	0.2	N/A
Bangladesh Jatiyatabadi Awami League (Mostofa Allama)	Mostofa Allama	276	0.2	N/A
Independent	Md. Masuk Murad	248	0.1	N/A
Islamic Dal Bangladesh (Saifur)	Md. Soyfur Rahman	221	0.1	N/A
BKA	Nasir Uddin	159	0.1	N/A
Jatiya Janata Party (Nurul Islam)	Md. Abdul Matin Chowdhury	144	0.1	N/A
Majority		720	0.4	−1.0
Turnout		183,280	66.6	+26.3
AL gain from BNP				

General Election 1991: Sylhet-1
Party	Candidate	Votes	%	±%
BNP	Khandaker Abdul Malik	37,090	31.7	
AL	Iftekhar Hossain Shamim	35,470	30.3	
Jamaat	Shafiqur Rahman	17,517	15.0	
JSD	Sadar Uddin Ahmad	7,865	6.7	
IOJ	Md. Masud Khan	7,736	6.6	
Independent	Md. Nausheran Chowdhury	7,224	6.2	
Jatiya Janata Party (Aashraf)	Shafikur Rahman	2,048	1.7	
Islami Samajtantrik Dal	Liaqat Ali Khan	867	0.7	
Zaker Party	Md. Abdul Karim	449	0.4	
Bangladesh Nezam-e-Islam Party	A. Rakib	445	0.4	
Bangladesh Islamic Biplobi Parishad	Sheikh Md. Obaidullah Bin Sayeed Jalalabadi	202	0.2	
CPB	Md. Abdul Malek	141	0.1	
Majority		1,620	1.4	
Turnout		117,054	40.3	
BNP gain from Independent				
