= Sylhet Government Pilot High School =

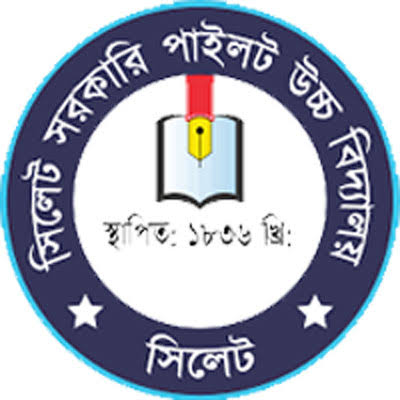
- Kalighat, Sylhet; Bangladesh

Information
- Former names: Sylhet Government High School
- Type: Public
- Established: 1836; 190 years ago
- School board: Board of Intermediate and Secondary Education, Sylhet
- School code: 130400 (EIIN)
- Headmaster: Shefali Sultana (in charge)
- Teaching staff: 55
- Employees: 10
- Grades: 3–10
- Years offered: 7
- Primary years taught: 3rd through 5th grades
- Secondary years taught: 6th through 10th grades
- Gender: Male
- Education system: According to the current curriculum of National Curriculum and Textbook Board
- Language: Bengali
- Hours in school day: 10
- Campus: Urban
- Colors: White and Navy Blue
- Nickname: Pilot School / Govt. Pilot / Pilot
- Publication: Magazine
- Yearbook: প্রবাহ (publishes after 2 years)
- Website: sylgovpilothss.edu.bd sylhetgovtpilothighschool.godaddysites.com
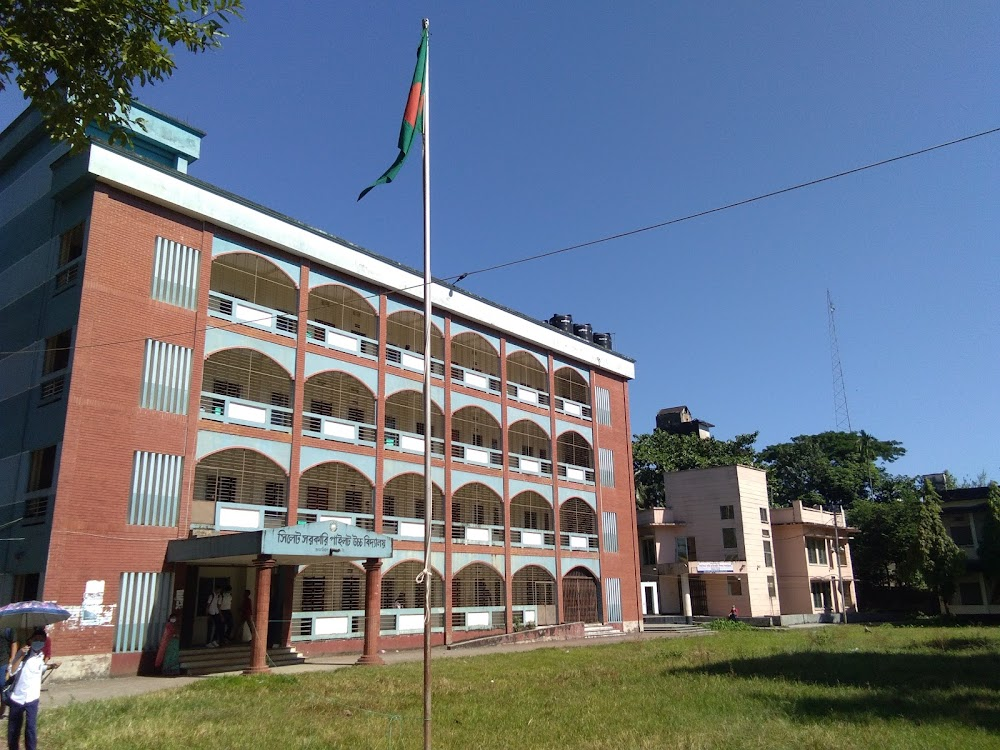

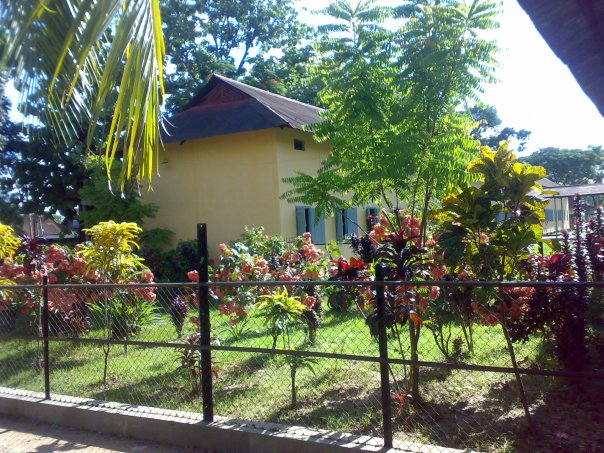

The Sylhet Government Pilot High School (Bengali: সিলেট সরকারি পাইলট উচ্চ বিদ্যালয়) is a school in Bangladesh. Established in 1836, it is situated in the Kalighat area of Sylhet, on the bank of the Surma River.

== History ==
Around 1830, during the rule of the British East India Company, Lord William Bentinck had ordered the establishment of this school in order to make the people of the region speak English properly.

The school, the first English one in Sylhet, was formally founded in 1836. In 1841, only 41 students were studying there. Reverend Price then took charge of the school as headmaster and transformed the school into a missionary school. The school was then handed over to Reverend Price.

In 1869, the name of the school was changed to "Sylhet Government High School" and Roy Saheb Durga Kumar Bose was appointed as the headmaster. The school was destroyed in the earthquake of 1897 and later the school was moved to its present location (Kalighat). When Roy Saheb Durga Kumar Bose voluntarily retired in 1903, Baikunthanath Bhattacharya took charge as the headmaster. Another earthquake destroyed the school in 1918 and the school was rebuilt in 1919. In 1926, the school was damaged by a severe flood and in 1929, the entire school, except for one building, was destroyed by fire. During World War II in 1939, the school building was used as a camp for soldiers, and after the soldiers left, the school resumed its work.

In 1955, the school was named Sylhet Government Pilot High School by the project of piloting schools by the East Pakistan Government. In 1962, Abdul Wahid Chowdhury took over as headmaster, improved the science lab, and increased the number of teachers. In 1967 he was selected as the best head teacher of the Chittagong division. In the same year, he was awarded "Tamga-e-Khedmat" for his radical transformation of the school.

In 1971, Pakistani soldiers set fire to the school, destroying many important documents and burning books. In 1999, the school was divided into morning and day shifts.

== Notable alumni ==
- Syed Mujtaba Ali, writer
- Sundari Mohan Das, medical doctor
- AK Abdul Momen, Foreign Minister
- M. A. G. Osmani, Commander in Chief, Bangladesh Liberation Army, 1971
- Bipin Chandra Pal, writer and politician
- Abu Nasr Waheed, educator
