= Sanja Štiglic =

Slovenian civil servant, diplomat and politician

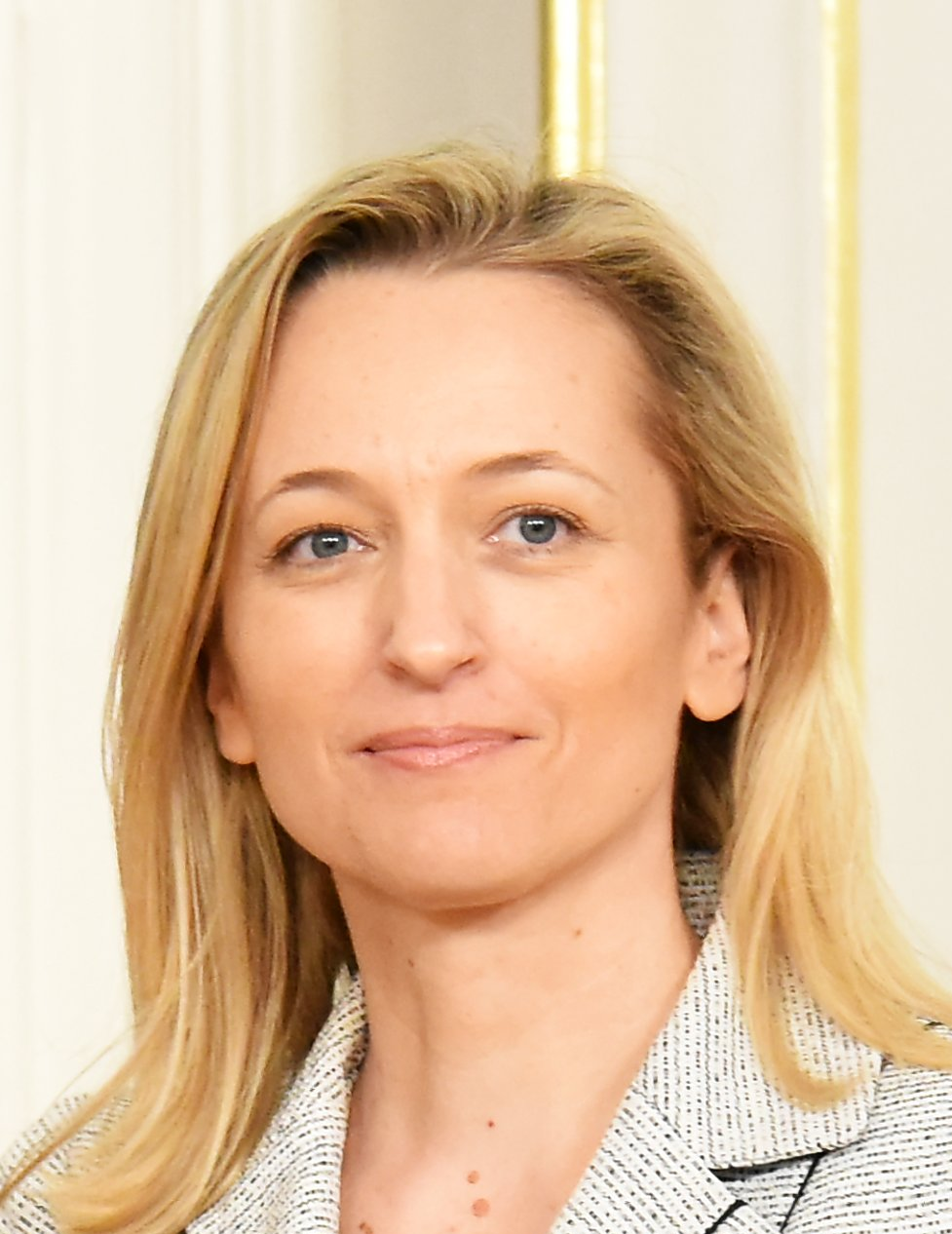
Sanja Štiglic in July 2016

Sanja Štiglic (born 10 March 1970) is a Slovenian civil servant, diplomat and politician, and a former President of the UNICEF Executive Board at the international level.

== Life ==
Sanja Štiglic studied law at the University of Ljubljana.

She was advisor to the foreign minister in 1996 and 1997 then under-secretary of the Ministry of Foreign and European Affairs in 2003 and 2004.

She served as Slovenia's ambassador to the United Nations in New York from 2007 to 2012, and as President of the UNICEF Executive Board in 2011. In 2016 she became director-general of the Directorate for Multilateral Affairs, Development Cooperation and International Law, and in the same year, she was appointed state secretary at the Foreign Ministry.

From 2017 to 2022, she was the Slovenian ambassador to the Netherlands and permanent representative to the Organisation for the Prohibition of Chemical Weapons (OPCW).

On 28 September 2023, she is appointed state secretary at the Foreign Ministry.
