= Sitesh Chandra Bachar =

Bangladeshi academic

- Born: 16 February 1962 (age 64); Hatiardanga, Koyra Upazila, Khulna District, East Pakistan, Pakistan
- Known for: Medicinal chemistry, natural products chemistry

Academic background
- Education: University of Dhaka; Jadavpur University
- Thesis: (1996)

Sitesh Chandra Bachar is a Bangladeshi academic and medicinal chemist, serving as a professor in the Department of Pharmacy, Faculty of Pharmacy at the University of Dhaka. He is a former Pro-vice chancellor of the University of Dhaka.

== Early life and education ==
Bachar was born on 16 February 1962 in Hatiardanga, Koyra Upazila, Khulna District, East Pakistan, Pakistan. He completed his Bachelor of Pharmacy in 1983 and Master of Pharmacy in 1984 from the University of Dhaka. He was awarded a PhD in pharmacy from Jadavpur University in 1996 under the Department of Pharmaceutical Technology.

== Career ==
Bachar began his academic career as an assistant professor at the University of Science and Technology, Chittagong in June 1996. He joined the Department of Pharmacy at the University of Dhaka as a lecturer in January 1997.

Bachar was promoted to assistant professor in July 1998 and later to associate professor in September 2002. He served in both the Department of Pharmacy and the Department of Pharmaceutical Technology in various academic capacities. He became a professor in March 2007 and continued in this role, later serving as Professor in the Department of Pharmacy from May 2014.

In November 2017, Bachar was named in a media report concerning an alleged altercation during a meeting of the Blue Panel, a pro-Awami League teachers' associationat the University of Dhaka. According to allegations reported by bdnews24.com, A. K. M. Jamal Uddin, a faculty member, claimed that Bachar and others were involved in physically assaulting him during the incident.

In January 2021, Bachar was appointed Dean of the Faculty of Pharmacy at the University of Dhaka. As an academic, Bachar has contributed to the development of clinical and hospital pharmacy training in Bangladesh, including implementing training programs at Dhaka Medical College Hospital for pharmacy students.

Bachar was appointed Pro-Vice-Chancellor (academic) of the University of Dhaka in January 2024. He succeeded Professor ASM Maksud Kamal. He is the convenor of the Blue Panel, the pro-Awami League faculty association at University of Dhaka. He is an editor of the International Journal of Medical and All Body Health Research. He is an member of the editorial board of the Dhaka University Journal of Pharmaceutical Sciences.

Despite calls for Bachar and Dr Muhammad Samad to resign as pro-vice chancellors of the University of Dhaka following the fall of Sheikh Hasina led Awami League government, they did not resign. They were replaced by Sayema Haque Bidisha, Mamun Ahmed, and Dr Mohammad Ismail. In January 2025, students protested demanding Bachar resign from the University of Dhaka Syndicate Board along with Professor S. M. Bahalul Majnun Chunnu and Dr Md. Nizamul Hoque Bhuiyan. All three were involved with the blue panel and Bachar was President of the Dhaka University Teachers Association.

== Awards and fellowships ==
- PhD Scholarship, Indian Council for Cultural Relations, India (1990)
- Senior Research Fellow, Ministry of Science and Technology, Bangladesh (2001)
- Postdoctoral Research Fellow, Saudi Arabia (2004), focusing on drug use management in hospitals under the Ministry of Health
