= Sardar Md. Rashed Jahangir =

Bangladeshi Judge

Justice of the High Court Division of Bangladesh
- Incumbent
- Assumed office 12 October 1995

Personal details
- Born: December 5, 1972 (age 53)
- Profession: Judge

Sardar Md. Rashed Jahangir is a Justice of the High Court Division of the Bangladesh Supreme Court.

== Early life ==
Jahangir was born on 5 December 1972. He has an undergrad and master's in Law.

== Career ==
Jahangir joined the District Courts as an advocate on 12 October 1995. He started practicing in the High Court Division on 10 July 1999.

Jahangir became a lawyer of the Appellate Division of the Bangladesh Supreme Court on 29 March 2018. He was made an additional judge of the High Court Division on 31 May 2018 by President Mohammad Abdul Hamid. The 18 newly appointed judges visited the shrine of President Sheikh Mujibur Rahman, father of incumbent Prime Minister Sheikh Hasina, to pay homage.

On 30 May 2020, Jahangir was made a permanent Judge of the High Court Division. In March 2020, Jahangir and Justice Md Ashraful Kamal issued an order asking the Secretary of the Ministry of Health and Family Welfare to issue a gazette notification describing COVID-19 as a communicable disease under the Communicable Diseases (Prevention, Control and Eradication) Act, 2018 following a petition filed by the Law and Life Foundation. Following which the government issued the gazette notification. Jahangir and Justice Md Ashraful Kamal sought more information sought more information on the sentencing of journalist Ariful Islam of Bangla Tribune to one year imprisonment on allegations of possession of drugs by an executive magistrate in the middle of the night. Islam was picked up at night by three magistrates and police, tortured in custody, and threatened with execution for writing against the District Commissioner Sultana Pervin. President Mohammad Abdul Hamid exonerated the former District Commissioner Sultana Pervin of all charges related to the arrest on 27 November 2011.

Jahangir and Justice M Enayetur Rahim upheld a decision by a court in Dhaka to order the Anti-Corruption Commission to frieze the bank accounts and the properties of AKMA Awal, former Awami League member of Parliament, and his wife. Jahangir and Justice M Enayetur Rahim questioned the legality of the allocation of 912 plots in Purbachal New Town Project, located in Gazipur District, given the allegation of irregularities in the allocation. In June 2021, Jahangir and Justice M Enayetur Rahim asked former Prime Minister Khaleda Zia to submit her relevant documents proving her birth date after a petition was filed asking the court stop her celebrating her birthday on 15 August which is the National Mourning Day when former President Sheikh Mujibur Rahman was assassinated. AM Mahbub Uddin Khokon represented Khaleda Zia and opposed the petition. Jahangir and Justice M Enayetur Rahim questioned the legality of the University of Dhaka firing Professor Morshed Hasan Khan of the Department of Marketing on 9 September 2020 on allegations that he had distorted the history of Bangladesh and defamed Sheikh Mujibur Rahman in a newspaper article titled Jyotirmoy Zia, published on 25 March 2018.

In March 2022, Jahangir and Justice Syed Md. Ziaul Karim confirmed the death sentence of Kabirul, fugitive son of former member of parliament Karimuddin Vorosha, in the case filed over the murder of his younger brother, Khairul Islam Vorosha, in 2009.

In May 2023, Jahangir and Justice Muhammad Khurshid Alam Sarkar asked Muhammad Yunus, a Nobel Laureate and founder of Grameen Bank, to pay 120 million BDT on back taxes on 767.3 million BDT endowments to three of his trusts, Professor Muhammad Yunus Trust, Yunus Centre, and Yunus Family Trust from 2011 to 2014. The tax was imposed by the Deputy Commissioner of Taxes which Yunus challenged at the Tax Appellate Tribunal and lost. He filed three separate appeal at the High Court Division against the Tax court verdict and Jahangir and Justice Muhammad Khurshid Alam Sarkar dismissed those petitions and asked him to pay. The decision of the court was based on the Gift Tax Act, 1990.
