= Angela Gomes =

Bangladeshi social worker

- এঞ্জেলা গোমেজ
- Born: 16 July 1952 (age 74); Dhaka, East Bengal, Dominion of Pakistan
- Awards: Magsaysay Award (1999)

Angela Gomes (born 16 July 1952) is a Bangladeshi social worker. She is the founder and executive director of Banchte Shekha (Learn How To Survive), a non-governmental organization, since 1976. She won the Magsaysay Award in 1999 for community leadership.

== Awards ==
- "Best Social Worker" award by Bangladesh National Social Welfare Council (1988)
- "Best Female Workers for Social Development" by Anannaya (1997)
- "Kirtimati Nari – Best Social Worker" by Square group (2008)
- "Begum Rokeya Padak" (1999)
- Honorary Doctorate Degree (Honoris Causa) from International KIIT University, Bhubaneswar, Odisha, India (2014)
- Star Lifetime Award for Social Work (2016)

== Works ==
Gomes wrote books which include "Learning through Works for Adults", "Living with Rights", "Easy Living of Children" and "How I Reached".
