= JGU =

JGU may refer to:

- Jatiya Ganamukti Union, a Bangladeshi political party
- Johannes Gutenberg University of Mainz, in Germany
- John Garang Memorial University, in Bor, South Sudan
- O. P. Jindal Global University, in Sonipat, Haryana, India
