= Md. Morshed Hasan Khan =

Md. Morshed Hasan Khan is an academic and professor of marketing at the University of Dhaka.He is also the syndicate member of the University of Dhaka. Khan is the convenor of the white panel (In Bengali Sada Dal), a teacher's organization affiliated with the Bangladesh Nationalist Party. He is the secretary general of the University Teachers' Association of Bangladesh.

== Career ==
Morshed Hasan Khan is an Mass Education secretary of the Bangladesh Nationalist Party's executive committee.

He had written an article called "Jyotirmoy Zia" for Naya Diganta that allegedly contained defamatory content about former President Sheikh Mujibur Rahman. He was suspended in 2018 after protests by the Bangladesh Chhatra League. A sedition case was filed against him by an activist of the Bangladesh Chhatra League, the student wing of the Awami League. He stated in the article that most Awami League leaders, including Sheikh Mujibur Rahman, left the country during the Bangladesh Liberation War, and Major Ziaur Rahman declared the independence of Bangladesh. Dhaka University Teachers' Association called for action against him, while teachers affiliated with the Bangladesh Nationalist Party expressed support for him.

In September 2020, the University of Dhaka terminated Khan over his comments on Sheikh Mujibur Rahman after a syndicate meeting according to pro-vice-chancellor ASM Maksud Kamal. Amnesty International was critical of the process. The Syndicate body also terminated two other teachers affiliated with the Bangladesh Nationalist Party, Radia Taisir and Saiful Islam. He filed a writ petition against the decision with the High Court Division. In June 2021, Justices M. Enayetur Rahim and Sardar Md. Rashed Jahangir of the High Court Division asked the University of Dhaka and the government of Bangladesh to explain why his termination should not be declared illegal. In July 2022, Justices Bhishmadev Chakrabarty and S. M. Moniruzzaman of the High Court Division rejected his petition against an eviction notice sent by the University of Dhaka and asked him to vacate his official residence at the University.

In June 2024, Khan was appointed publicity secretary of the Bangladesh Nationalist Party by Tareque Rahman. He is a director of the Ziaur Rahman Foundation.

In December 2024, Khan was appointed convenor of the white panel, a pro-Bangladesh Nationalist Party teacher's association. Another fraction of the White Panel was formed following disagreements between members, and Aminul Islam Talukdar was appointed its convenor. He led a protest of white panel teachers against Israel where he said, "We stand with Palestine and will continue to do so. If necessary, we will be there as fighters. We are ready to enlist our names there. We must respond with armed resistance against this.". He demanded the arrest of Zeenat Huda, professor of sociology at the University of Dhaka, in a signed statement which alleged she supported former Prime Minister Sheikh Hasina. Professors Abdus Salam and Abul Kalam Sarker, joint convenors of the White Panel also signed the statement.
