= Minister of Social Welfare =

Minister of Social Welfare may refer to:

- Minister of Social Welfare (Bangladesh)
- Minister of Social Development (South Africa)
