= Mokhlesur Rahman =

Mokhlesur Rahman may refer to:

- Mokhlesur Rahman (Dinajpur politician)
- Mokhlesur Rahman (Gazipur politician)
- Md. Mokhlesur Rahman, Bangladeshi politician
- Md. Mokhlesur Rahman (government official), secretary of the Ministry of Public Administration
