= Rezwanul Haque =

Bangladeshi politician

Minister of Social Welfare
- In office January 1988 – December 1990
- Preceded by: M. Shamsul Haque
- Succeeded by: Alamgir M. A. Kabir

Member of Parliament from Thakurgaon-1
- In office 1986–1990
- Succeeded by: Khademul Islam

Member of Parliament from Dinajpur-3
- In office 1979–1982
- Preceded by: Mohammad Fazlul Karim
- Succeeded by: Amzad Hossain

Personal details
- Born: Rezwanul Haque Idu Chowdhury; 1930
- Died: 25 May 1994 (aged 63–64)
- Party: Jatiya Party (Ershad)
- Other political affiliations: Bangladesh Nationalist Party, National Awami Party (Bhashani)
- Spouse: Sultana Rezwan Chowdhury

Rezwanul Haque Idu Chowdhury (1930–1994) was a politician from Thakurgaon District of Bangladesh. He was a member of parliament for Dinajpur-3 and later Thakurgaon-1, and Minister of Social Welfare.

== Career ==
Haque first sought election to parliament, unsuccessfully, in 1973 as a National Awami Party (Bhashani) candidate.

Haque was elected to parliament from Dinajpur-3 as a Bangladesh Nationalist Party candidate in 1979.

He joined the Jatiya Party in 1986 and was elected to parliament from Thakurgaon-1 as a Jatiya Party candidate in 1986 and 1988. He was appointed Minister of Social Welfare and Women's Affairs in the Ershad government in January 1988. The ministry was later split. Haque continued as Minister of Social Welfare from November 1989 to December 1990, while Syeda Razia Faiz became Minister of Women's Affairs in January 1990.

== Personal life ==
Chowdhury was married to Sultana Rezwan Chowdhury, daughter of Haji Mohammad Danesh.
