= Minister of Social Welfare (Bangladesh) =

Bangladeshi cabinet position

- বাংলাদেশের সমাজকল্যাণমন্ত্রী
- Government Seal of Bangladesh

- Flag of Bangladesh

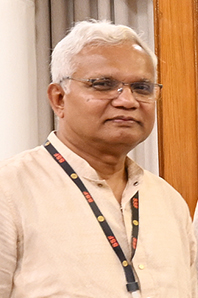
- Incumbent; A. Z. M. Zahid Hossain since 17 February 2026
- Ministry of Social Welfare
- Style: The Honourable (formal); His Excellency (diplomatic)
- Type: Cabinet minister
- Status: Minister
- Member of: Cabinet; Advisory Council; Parliament
- Reports to: Prime Minister
- Seat: Bangladesh Secretariat
- Nominator: Prime Minister of Bangladesh
- Appointer: President of Bangladesh; on the advice of the Prime Minister
- Term length: Prime Minister's pleasure
- Formation: 9 November 1989; 36 years ago
- First holder: Rezwanul Haque Idu Chowdhury
- Website: moedu.gov.bd

The Minister of Social Welfare is the minister in charge of the Ministry of Social Welfare, and one of the cabinet ministers of the Government of Bangladesh He is also the minister of all departments and agencies under the Ministry of Social Welfare. This ministry was earlier known as the Ministry of Health and Social Welfare. Listed here are the names of all the ministers, advisors, state ministers and deputy ministers.

== Minister in charge, Adviser and Minister of State ==
No	Name	Picture	Start	End	Political Party
1	Rezwanul Haque Idu Chowdhury (Minister)		14 November 1989	6 December 1990	Jatiya Party
2	Alamgir M. A. Kabir (advisor)		17 December 1990	15 March 1991	Caretaker Government
3	Tariqul Islam (State Minister)		20 March 1991	19 September 1991	Bangladesh Nationalist Party
4	Tariqul Islam (Minister)		19 September 1991	14 August 1993	Bangladesh Nationalist Party
5	Sarwari Rahman (State Minister)		19 September 1991	14 August 1993	Bangladesh Nationalist Party
6	Fazlur Rahman Potol (State Minister)		14 August 1993	30 March 1996	Bangladesh Nationalist Party
7	Najma Chowdhury (advisor)		3 April 1996	23 June 1996	Caretaker Government
8	Mozammel Hossain (State Minister)		23 June 1996	15 July 2001	Bangladesh Awami League
9	Rokeya Afzal Rahman (advisor)		16 July 2001	10 October 2001	Caretaker Government
10	Ali Ahsan Mohammad Mojaheed (Minister)		11 October 2001	29 October 2006	Bangladesh Jamaat-e-Islami
11	Yasmeen Murshed (advisor)		11 January 2007	1 November 2007	Caretaker Government
12	Geetiara Safya Chowdhury (advisor)		1 November 2007	8 January 2008	Caretaker Government
13	M. A. Malek (Special aid)		15 January 2008	6 January 2009	Special Duty
14	Enamul Haque Mostafa Shahid (Minister)		6 January 2009	20 November 2013	Bangladesh Awami League
15	Promode Mankin (State Minister)		15 September 2012	11 May 2016	Bangladesh Awami League
16	Syed Mohsin Ali (Minister)		12 January 2014	14 September 2015	Bangladesh Awami League
17	Nuruzzaman Ahmed (State Minister)		19 June 2016	7 January 2019	Bangladesh Awami League
18	Rashed Khan Menon (Minister)		3 January 2018	7 January 2019	Workers Party of Bangladesh
19	Nuruzzam Ahmed (Minister)		7 January 2019	5 August 2024	Bangladesh Awami League
20	Sharif Ahmed (State Minister)		7 January 2019	5 August 2024	Bangladesh Awami League
21	A. Z. M. Zahid Hossain (Minister)		17 February 2026		Bangladesh Nationalist Party
22	Farzana Sharmin (State Minister)		17 February 2026		Bangladesh Nationalist Party
