= South Asian Network on Economic Modeling =

Bangladeshi non-profit research institute

- Formation: 2007
- Headquarters: Dhaka, Bangladesh
- Region served: Bangladesh
- Official language: Bengali
- Website: sanemnet.org

The South Asian Network on Economic Modeling (SANEM) is a Bangladeshi non-profit research institute, established by Dr. Selim Raihan, that specializes in economic modelling. Bazlul Haque Khondker is the chairman of the South Asian Network on Economic Modelling, and Dr. Selim Raihan is its executive director.

== History ==
The South Asian Network on Economic Modelling (SANEM) was established in January 2007 as a non-profit research organization. Bazlul Haque Khondker is the chairman of the South Asian Network on Economic Modelling, and Dr. Selim Raihan is its executive director. Sayema Haque Bidisha worked as the research director.

In 2017, SANEM organized a conference of economists titled Bangladesh: Way towards a Middle-Income Country, where the keynote speaker was Wahiduddin Mahmud.

SANEM conducted a study highlighting the stark digital divide in Bangladesh, especially across income and gender lines, revealing that low-income and female populations have significantly less access to ICT services. It was found that only a tiny percentage of women, particularly from poorer households, own smartphones or receive ICT training, exacerbating inequality in digital inclusion and threatening the government goal of Digital Bangladesh.

SANEM worked with The Asia Foundation to study the impact of the COVID-19 pandemic in Bangladesh on businesses. Executive director of SANEM Selim Raihan stated that if calculated correctly, defaulted loans in Bangladesh would be 2 trillion BDT. SANEM stated in 2023 that food insecurity had doubled in Bangladesh.

In February 2024, SANEM organized an event where experts warned that political disunity in Bangladesh is harming its diplomatic and economic progress. They criticized the lack of transparency in foreign negotiations, especially related to Rohingya refugees in Bangladesh, and the absence of parliamentary debate on key issues. The panel included M. Shakhawat Hossain, M. Humayun Kabir, Imtiaz Ahmed, and Lailufar Yasmin.
