= Mamun Ahmed =

Bangladeshi academic

- মামুন আহমেদ
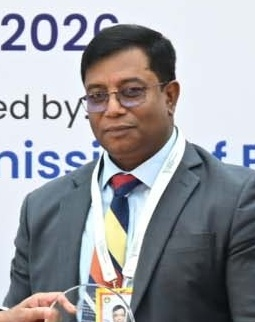
- Ahmed in 2026

Chairman of University Grants Commission
- Incumbent
- Assumed office 16 March 2026
- Prime Minister: Tarique Rahman

Pro-vice-chancellor of the University of Dhaka
- In office 13 September 2024 – 16 March 2026

Personal details
- Education: University of Dhaka; Nihon University (PhD)
- Occupation: University administrator

Mamun Ahmed is a Bangladeshi academic and the chairman of Bangladesh University Grants Commission. He was the pro-vice chancellor of Dhaka University. He is a professor of the Department of Biochemistry and Molecular Biology. He was an advisor to the Bangladesh Nationalist Party chairperson Khaleda Zia and President of Jatiyatabadi Samajik Sangskritik Sangstha.

== Early life ==
Ahmed was born on 1 January 1967 in Jagatpur village, Darbeshpur Union, Ramganj Upazila, Lakshmipur District, East Pakistan. He did his bachelor's degree and masters in biochemistry at the University of Dhaka in 1989 and 1991. He completed his PhD at the Nihon University in Molecular Virology in 1996.

== Career ==
Ahmed joined the University of Dhaka as a lecturer on 28 March 1996 in the Department of Biochemistry and Microbiology. He was promoted to assistant professor on 24 October 1997. He was a postdoctoral fellow at the University of Pittsburgh from 1 December 1997 to 1999 and later worked as a research associate professor at the university.

On 1 December 2004, Ahmed was promoted to associate professor. In December 2007, he wore a black band as the acting general secretary of the Dhaka University Teachers Association protesting campus violence.

Ahmed was promoted to full professor in December 2008. He is a former general secretary of Dhaka University Teacher's Association. He is an advisor to the Bangladesh Nationalist Party chairperson and former prime minister Khaleda Zia. He served three terms in the senate of the University of Dhaka. In May 2009, he was elected to the senate of the University of Dhaka as a candidate of the white panel, backed by the Bangladesh Nationalist Party.

In 2017, Ahmed was appointed president of the Jatiyatabadi Samajik Sangskritik Sangstha following approval by Mirza Fakhrul Islam Alamgir, general secretary of the Bangladesh Nationalist Party. In December 2022, he called for the release of Mirza Fakhrul Islam Alamgir from prison.

Following the fall of the Sheikh Hasina led Awami League government, Ahmed was appointed pro-vice chancellor of the University of Dhaka in September 2024 replacing Professor Dr Sitesh Chandra Bachar. In January 2025, students of seven colleges formerly affiliated with the University of Dhaka demanded his resignation and alleged Ahmed had misbehaved with them. He later expressed regret for this. He inaugurated the July Martyr Memorial Building, which is an extension of the Sheikh Mujibur Rahman Hall of the University of Dhaka.
