= A. K. M. Jamal Uddin =

Professor

Abul Kashem Mohammad Jamal Uddin is a Bangladeshi academic and professor in the Department of Sociology at the University of Dhaka.

Uddin was arrested in March 2026 on allegations of attempting to organise a Bangabandhu Peace March-2026 from Dhaka to Tungipara associated with the Awami League, whose activities had been banned at the time. He was sent to jail under the Anti-Terrorism Act.

== Early life ==
Uddin completed his Bachelor and Master of Social Science in Sociology from the University of Dhaka in 1993 and 1995 respectively. He later obtained a PhD in Sociology and Social Policy from the University of Leeds in 2006.

== Career ==
Uddin joined the University of Dhaka as a lecturer in the Department of Sociology in April 1997. He was promoted to assistant professor in February 2003, Associate Professor in August 2009, and Professor in April 2013. He has also served in various roles, including part-time Lecturer in the Department of Geography and Environment, guest Lecturer in the Department of Islamic Studies, and student advisor in the Department of Sociology at the University of Dhaka. He has been involved as a resource person in training programmes on disaster management and served as Associate Editor of Social Science Review at the University of Dhaka.

In November 2017, Uddin was reportedly injured during an altercation at a meeting of the Blue Panel, a pro-Awami League teachers' group at the University of Dhaka. According to reports, Jamal alleged that he was assaulted by fellow faculty members during the meeting held at the Teacher-Student Centre. He claimed that he was physically attacked after protesting remarks made during the meeting. Other individuals present at the meeting provided differing accounts of the incident, and at least one accused party denied involvement in the alleged assault.

Uddin faced criticism in May 2023 for suggesting that the Sheikh Hasina led Awami League government extend the government's tenure without elections due to the COVID-19 pandemic in Bangladesh.

In December 2025, Uddin was confronted by a group of students of the University of Dhaka and forced to leave the campus following an incident at the Faculty of Social Sciences. According to reports, students chased him after alleging that he was participating in a “secret meeting,” while university authorities acknowledged prior tensions regarding his presence on campus. Another report on the same incident stated that Dhaka University Central Students' Union (DUCSU) leader AB Jubayer attempted to detain Uddin and Professor Zeenat Huda, hand them over to police over allegations of holding a “secret meeting,” although a colleague denied the claim and said they had been visiting the campus for administrative purposes. Professors Dr Towhida Rashid and Dr Md. Azmal Hossain Bhuiyan accompanies the two when they went to the Vice-chancellor to submit a memorandum demanding teachers who were barred from taking classes be allowed do so.

In March 2026, Uddin was arrested by Bangladesh Police from Paltan Model Police Station in connection with a case filed under the Anti-Terrorism Act. According to police officials, he was detained near the Gulistan Stadium area, while reports also noted that he had been assaulted earlier on 15 February 2026 during a visit to Dhanmondi 32, residence and museum of President Sheikh Mujibur Rahman. Reports stated that he was arrested during the inauguration of a programme titled the “Bangabandhu Peace March 2026,” which he had initiated to promote national harmony. According to these accounts, he was detained shortly after the march began and later transferred to Dhaka Central Jail, Keraniganj, while his bail petitions were reportedly rejected by lower courts. The arrest drew criticism from sections of the academic community, with some faculty members expressing concern over the use of anti-terrorism laws and describing the action as a violation of academic and civil freedoms.
