= Kumudini Government College =

Women's College in Tangail, Bangladesh

Kumudini Govt. College, Tangail
- কুমুদিনী সরকারী কলেজ, টাংগাইল
- Type: Public
- Principal: PROFESSOR MD. ABDUR RAZZAQUE KHAN
- Faculty: 156
- Administrative staff: 120
- Students: 10000+-
- Location: Tangail, Bangladesh; 24.2575°N 89.9239°E
- Campus: Urban
- Website: www.kgc.ac.bd

Kumudini Government College (Bengali: কুমুদিনী সরকারী কলেজ), also called Kumudini Mohila College, located in Tangail, is a women's college affiliated with Bangladesh National University. The college was established in 1943 by Ranada Prasad Saha, a businessman and philanthropist, became affiliated with the University of Calcutta in 1944, and was nationalized in 1979. Until 1959 when Muminunnisa Mohila College was established in Mymensingh, it was the only women's college in East Pakistan.

== Programmes ==
The college offers higher secondary and degree programmes as well as post-secondary Honours and Masters programmes. The college also arranges cultural, literary and sports programmes for its students.

== Famous alumnae ==
Well-known alumnae of Kumudini College include:

- Shamim Azad, writer
- Niru Shamsunnahar PhD Art Historian Museumologist and Art Critic
- Khurshid Jahan, politician
