= Detention of Ariful Islam =

2020 detention of a Bangladeshi journalist

Ariful Islam is a journalist of Dhaka Tribune and Bangla Tribune who was controversially detained in the middle of the night and tortured in custody in March 2020. He was sentenced to jail for one year by executive magistrate at 2 am after reporting against the Kurigram Deputy Commissioner. The officials were found guilty by an administration court and received official punishment. President of Bangladesh, Mohammad Abdul Hamid suspended the punishment of the deputy commissioner.

== Detention ==
Ariful Islam is a correspondent of Bangla Tribune and Dhaka Tribune in Kurigram District. He had been threatened for writing news reports critical of the Kurigram Deputy Commissioner Sultana Pervin, in particular a report on her trying to rename a recently renovated pond after herself and irregularities in her office. On 13 March 2020, he was detained from his house by Senior Assistant Commissioner-Revenue of Kurigram District Nazim Uddin. The magistrate was accompanied by Assistant Commissioner Rintu Biswas Chakma and Assistant Commissioner SM Rahatul Islam. The magistrate was accompanied by 6-7 other people and 13 to 15 members of the paramilitary Bangladesh Ansar. They had entered Islam's house by breaking the door and assaulted him at his residence. There were around 40-50 people outside his residence, controlling the neighborhood to prevent any interference. Islam was taken to the office of the Deputy Commissioner blindfolded. He was stripped and tortured at the office. He was threatened with death in a crossfire, referring to a method of extrajudicial killing in Bangladesh. Ariful said he was threatened over his reports on the deputy commissioner.

Then Islam was sentenced to one year's imprisonment for allegedly keeping half a bottle of alcohol and 150 gram of marijuana at his residence. The sentence was given in the middle of the night at 2 am. Islam was also fined 50 thousand BDT. The Deputy Commissioner Sultana Pervin alleged a special task force led the drive at the request of the Department of Narcotics Control and it was not a mobile court. Assistant Director Abu Zafar of the Kurigram District unit of the Department of Narcotics Control said they accompanied the raid at the request of Deputy Commissioner Sultana Pervin on the night of the raid which contradicted the claims by the Deputy Commissioner. Superintendent of Police of Kurigram District, Md Mohibul Islam Khan, said they received the request to join the raid at 11 pm on the night of the raid which contradicted the claim by Sultana Pervin that the raid was planned long before that night. The police sent four officers. The document stating drugs were seized had the signature of Inspector Jahidul of the Department of Narcotics Control but he stated he was not present in the district at that time. A recording of a phone conversation between Ariful Islam and Sultana Pervin was released on social media and went "viral".

== Reaction ==
The arrest was protested by journalists in Kurigram District. The detention was condemned by Bangladesh Federal Union of Journalists, Dhaka Union of Journalists, Editors' Council, Gono Songhoti Andolan, and Transparency International Bangladesh. The arrest was condemned by the Bangladesh Nationalist Party, the opposition party, and PEN Bangladesh, the local chapter of PEN International. Panir Uddin Ahamed, member of parliament for Kurigram-2, also spoke out against Deputy Commissioner Sultana Pervin and said he has asked for her withdrawal in the past due to irregularities in recruitment in her office. The Minister of Information called the arrest improper. The detention was defended by Kurigram district deputy attorney general of Kurigram District Debashish Bhattcharyya. The State minister for the Ministry of Public Administration, Farhad Hossain, described the midnight judgement illegal and stated the deputy commissioner (Sultana Pervin) was not above the law.

Officer-in-charge of the Kurigram Sadar police, Mahfuzar Rahman, refused to record a case of false imprisonment by Ariful Islam without "permission" of his superiors. On 15 March, Ariful Islam had to be admitted to the Kurigram General Hospital due to injuries sustained from torture after receiving bail from Additional District Magistrate Court of Kurigram Judge Sirajuddoula. The bail petition was filed by Ahsan Habib Nilu, President of Kurigram Press Club.

On 15 March 2020, State minister for the Ministry of Public Administration, Farhad Hossain, told the media that Deputy Commissioner Sultana Pervin would be withdrawn from her posting over the incident following a draft of the investigation report by the Rangpur Divisional Commissioner. Shaikh Yusuf Harun, Secretary of the Ministry of Public Administration, also confirmed Sultana Pervin would be withdrawn following official formalities. On 16 March, Deputy Commissioner Sultana Pervin was withdrawn from her post. She was replaced by Md Rezaul Karim. She continued to write against Ariful Islam on Facebook after her withdrawal. She also claimed she was not aware of the raid but Mobile Court Act, 2009 the raid could not have been conducted without her authorization.

On 24 March 2020, Justices Md Ashraful Kamal and Sardar Md Rashed Jahangir of the High Court Division suspended the one-year sentence for six months. The bench also ordered to the Officer-in-charge of the Kurigram Sadar police to accept Ariful Islam's case as a First Information of Report. The bench asked the government to explain why the sentence should not be declared illegal. The executive editor of Bangla Tribune, Harun ur Rashid, had filed the petition with the Bangladesh High Court challenging the sentence. Lawyers AM Aminuddin, and Ishrat Hassan represented the petitioner and the state was represented by Deputy Attorney General Pratikar Chakma.

Sultana Pervin faced departmental charges under the Government Servants (Discipline and Appeal) Rules, 2018. She submitted a written statement and attended a private hearing at the Ministry of Public Administration led by additional secretary Md Ali Kader. The report by Ali Kader found Sultana Pervin guilty. Her written and personnel statements were deemed unsatisfactory and found evidence of misconduct against her. The Ministry of Public Administration withdrew Senior Assistant Commissioner-Revenue of Kurigram District Nazim Uddin, Assistant Commissioner Rintu Biswas Chakma and Assistant Commissioner SM Rahatul Islam. Four of them were accused in a departmental case.

On 18 March 2021, the Ministry of Public Administration recommended punishments against the government officials involved. Sultana Pervin's salary increment was suspended for two years.

President Mohammad Abdul Hamid suspended the punishment, no salary increment for two years, given to Deputy Commissioner Sultana Pervin and relieved of any liabilities related to the incident. Deputy Commissioner Sultana Pervin, deputy secretary of the Bangladesh Civil Service, was made an officer of special duty, viewed as punishment posting in the Bangladesh Civil Service. On 23 November 2021, the Ministry of Public Administration announced the decision of the President through a notification signed by KM Ali Azam. Ariful Islam expressed disappointment at the Presidents decision.
