= Sultana Rezwan Chowdhury =

Bangladeshi politician (c.1948–2019)

Member of Parliament for Reserved Women's Seat-1
- In office 1986–1988

Personal details
- Born: c. 1948
- Died: 25 December 2019 (aged 71)
- Party: Jatiya Party
- Occupation: Politician

Sultana Rezwan Chowdhury (c. 1948 – 25 December 2019) was a Bangladeshi politician from Thakurgaon belonging to Jatiya Party. She was a member of the Jatiya Sangsad.

== Biography ==
Chowdhury was the daughter of Haji Mohammad Danesh and her husband Rezwanul Haque Idu Chowdhury was a minister and lawmaker. She was elected as a member of the Jatiya Sangsad from Reserved Women's Seat-1 in 1986.

Chowdhury died on 25 December 2019 at the age of 71.
