= Syed Md. Ziaul Karim =

Bangladeshi judge

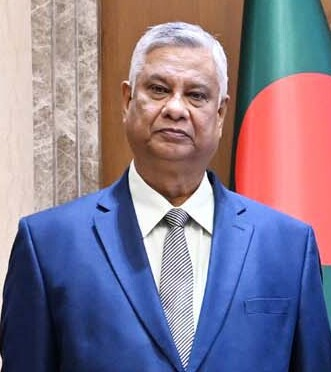

Justice of the Appellate Division, Supreme Court
- In office 13 August 2024 – 12 December 2024

Justice of the High Court Division of Bangladesh
- Incumbent
- Assumed office 23 August 2004

Personal details
- Born: December 12, 1957 (age 68)
- Profession: Judge

Syed Md. Ziaul Karim is a retired justice in the Appellate Division of Bangladesh Supreme Court.

== Early life ==
Ziaul Karim was born on 12 December 1957. He has a bachelor's in chemistry, a bachelor's and master's in law, and a PhD.

== Career ==
Ziaul Karim joined the district court on 18 March 1986.

On 18 April 1988, Ziaul Karim became a lawyer of the High Court Division. He joined the appellate court on 28 November 1996 as a lawyer.

Ziaul Karim was appointed an additional judge of the High Court on 23 August 2004 and was made permanent on 23 August 2006.

Ziaul Karim and Justice ANM Bashirullah granted bail to 13 Bangladesh Nationalist Party officials, including former member of parliament Shahiduddin Chowdhury Annie, on 21 June 2011 in a case filled over vandalism during general strike called by the party.

Ziaul Karim and Justice Ashish Ranjan Das gave a split verdict in the bail hearing of Bazlus Samad Adnan, who owned a garment factory in Rana Plaza, on 24 July 2014. Ziaul Karim favored bail for the accused while Ashish Ranjan Das opposed bail

Ziaul Karim and Sheikh Md Zakir Hossain in July 2015 granted bail to four Bangladesh Nationalist Party politicians Abdul Awal Mintoo, Amanullah Aman, M. K. Anwar, and Tariqul Islam in 56 cases.

On 5 June 2017, Ziaul Karim and Justice Sheikh Md Zakir Hossain awarded 171.1 million taka compensation to families of the 100 who died in the drowning of MV Nasrin -1 in 2003 from the government of Bangladesh. In August, he was tasked with visiting districts courts in Barisal District, Bhola District, and Jhalokati District.

On 23 March 2022, Ziaul Karim and Justice Sardar Md Rashed Jahangir confirmed the death sentence of Kabirul Islam Vorosha, who is the son of Jatiya Party politician and former member of parliament Karim Uddin Bharsha and went on the run after securing bail, for killing his brother Khairul Islam Vorosha. Ziaul Karim and Justice Sashanka Shekhar Sarkar heard 244 cases in one day on 20 April.
