= Sheikh Md. Zakir Hossain =

Bangladeshi judge

The Honourable Justice Sheikh Md. Zakir Hossain
- শেখ মোঃ জাকির হোসেন
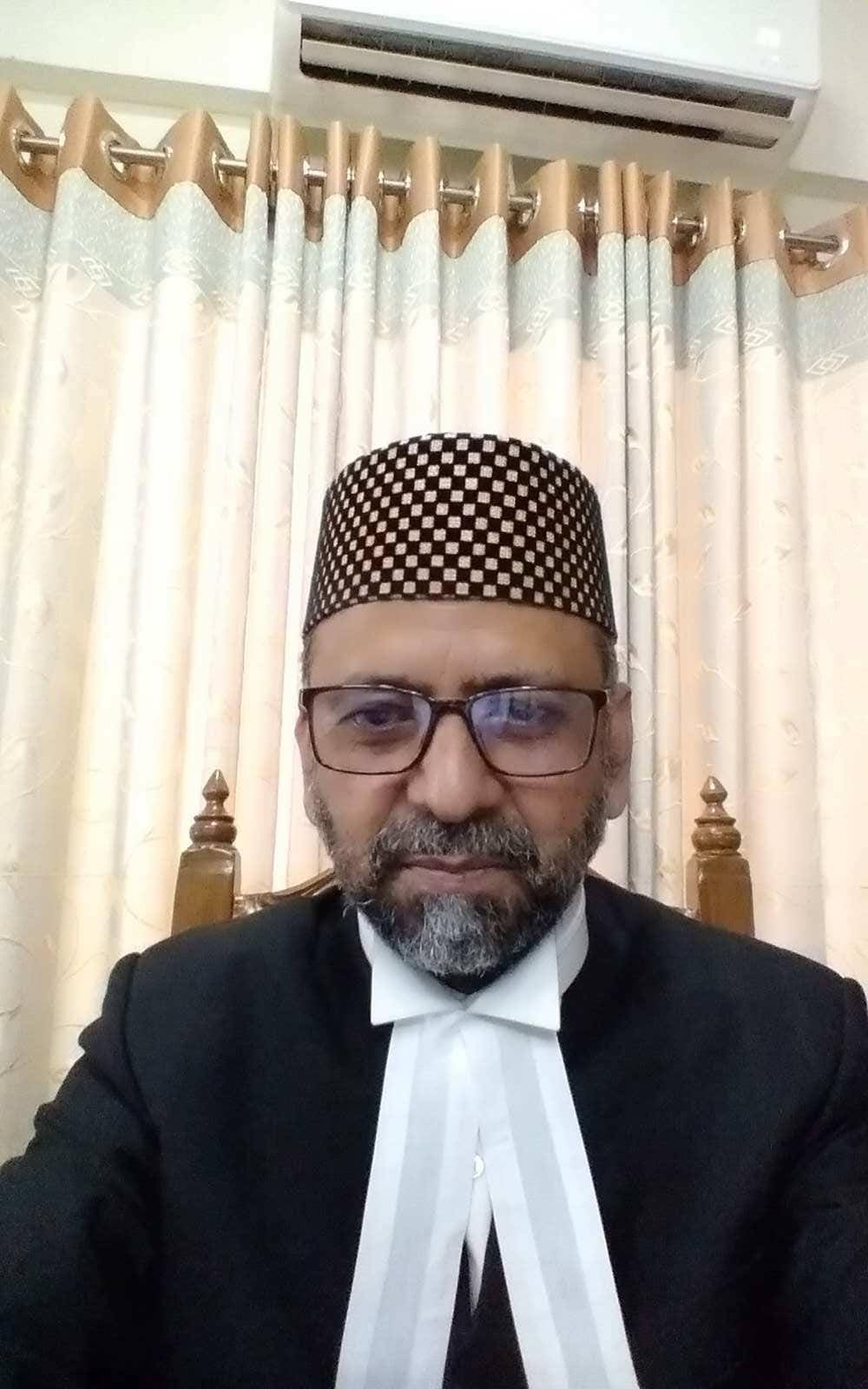

Justice of the High Court Division of Bangladesh
- Incumbent
- Assumed office 18 April 2010

Personal details
- Born: 2 March 1962 (age 64)
- Parent(s): Late Kanchan Sheikh(father); Most. Noorjahan Begum (mother)
- Profession: Judge

Sheikh Md. Zakir Hossain (born 2 March 1962) is a Bangladeshi justice of the High Court Division of the Supreme Court of Bangladesh. He is famous for delivering all his verdicts in the Bengali language. He was appointed in 2010.

== Early life ==
Hossain was born on 2 March 1962. He is a law graduate from the University of Dhaka.

== Career ==
Hossain was enrolled as an advocate of the District Court on 5 October 1988 and the High Court Division of the Supreme Court on 17 July 1993.

Hossain was appointed as an additional judge of the High Court Division on 18 April 2010. Hossain and Justice AHM Shamsuddin Chowdhury Manik issued a Sua sponte order in August 2010 that declared no one could be forced to wear the veil following a news report that said Rani Bhabani Mahila College would not allow female students without the veil to attend. Hossain and Justice M Enayetur Rahim on 23 August 2010 issued an arrest warrant against the deputy commissioner of Moulvibazar District, Mostafizur Rahman, for failing to appear before the court. Hossain and Justice AHM Shamsuddin Chowdhury Manik made the Deputy Commissioner of Kushtia District stand in the dock for hours on 29 September 2010 as punishment for contempt of court. Hossain and Justice AHM Shamsuddin Chowdhury Manik in November asked the government to explain the measures taken to tackle the increase in price of soybean oil.

On 3 February 2011, Hossain and Justice AHM Shamsuddin Chowdhury Manik asked the government to explain its failure to prevent fatwa after a 14 year old rape victim was whipped to death following a fatwa being issued against her. Hossain and Justice AHM Shamsuddin Chowdhury Manik on 22 March 2011 called the execution of colonel Abu Taher murder. Hossain and Justice AHM Shamsuddin Chowdhury Manik in November 2011 ordered the demolition of the BGMEA Bhaban.

On 16 January 2012, Hossain and Justice M Enayetur Rahim granted bail to former prime minister Khaleda Zia on corruption charges related to the Barapukuria coal mine case filed by the Anti-Corruption Commission. Hossain was made a permanent judge of the High Court Division on 15 April 2012.

On 29 April 2013, Hossain expressed embarrassment and inability to hear petitions by Mirza Fakrul Islam Alamgir, secretary general of the Bangladesh Nationalist Party, challenging the various vandalism cases filed against him. He was the junior justice in a bench with Justice Quamrul Islam Siddiqui.

On 8 August 2019, Hossain and Justice Mostafizur Rahman denied bail to Aysha Siddika Minni who had been accused of being involved in the murder of her husband, Rifat Sharif.

In June 2021, Hossain and Justice Khizir Hayat asked the Bangladesh Police to not just rely on a birth certificate when determining the age of an individual.
