= Mokhlesur Rahman (Dinajpur politician) =

Bangladeshi politician

Member of Parliament for Dinajpur-3
- In office 1988–1991
- Preceded by: Amzad Hossain
- Succeeded by: M. Abdur Rahim

Personal details
- Born: c. 1941
- Died: 12 September 2016 (aged 74-75) Dhaka
- Party: Jatiya Party (Ershad)

Mokhlesur Rahman (c. 1941 – 12 September 2016) was a Jatiya Party (Ershad) politician in Bangladesh and member of parliament for Dinajpur-3.

== Career ==
Rahman was elected to parliament from Dinajpur-3 as a Jatiya Party candidate in 1988.
