= Shamim Azad =

Bangladeshi-born British bilingual poet, storyteller and writer (born 1952)

- শামীম আজাদ
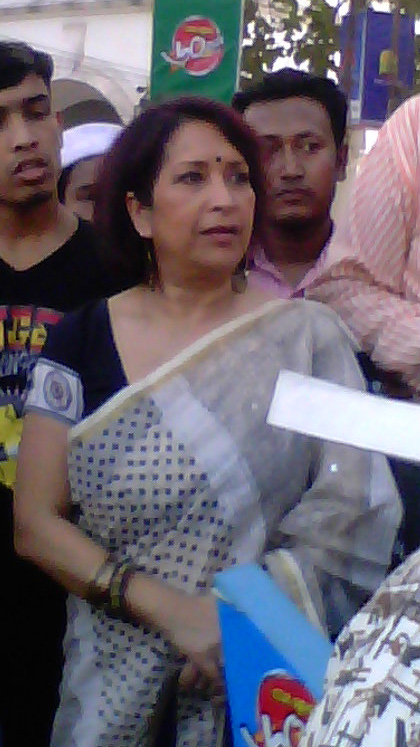
- Azad in 2012
- Born: 11 November 1952 (age 74); Mymensingh, East Bengal, Dominion of Pakistan
- Citizenship: British
- Education: Kumudini College; University of Dhaka
- Occupations: Poet, storyteller, writer
- Years active: 1988–present
- Spouse: Selim Jahan
- Parents: Abu Ahmad Mahmud Tarafdar (father); Anowara Khanom (mother)
- Awards: Bangla Academy Literary Award

Shamim Azad (born 11 November 1952) is a Bangladeshi-born British bilingual poet, storyteller and writer. She won 2023 Bangla Academy Literary Award in the poetry category.

== Early life ==
Azad was born in Mymensingh, East Bengal in the then Dominion of Pakistan where her father had worked. Her hometown was in Sylhet. She passed her SSC from Jamalpur Girls High School in 1967 and passed her HSC from Kumudini College in 1969. She enrolled in University of Dhaka and earned honours degree in 1972 and a master's degree in 1973.

In 1990, Azad came to England.

== Career ==
Azad's work ranges from Bangladeshi to European folktales. Her performance fuses the lines between education and entertainment and her workshops are rooted in Asian folk, oral traditions and heritage.

Azad has published 37 books including novels, collections of short stories, essays and poems in both English and Bengali and has been included in various anthologies including British South Asian Poetry, My Birth Was Not in Vain, Velocity, Emlit Project and Mother Tongues. She wrote two plays for Half Moon Theatre. She has worked with composers Richard Blackford, Kerry Andrew, choreographer Rosemary Lee, visual artist Robin Whitemore and playwright Mary Cooper.

Azad has performed at venues including the Museum of London, Edinburgh Fringe Festival, Cambridge Water Stone, Liberty Radio, Battersea Arts Centre, Lauderdale House, the Commonwealth Institute, British Library, British Council of Bangladesh, Takshila in Pakistan and New York. Her residencies have included, Tower Hamlets Summer University, Sunderland City Library and Arts Centre, East Side Arts, Poetry Society, Magic Me, Rich Mix Cultural Foundation, Kinetika, Bromley by Bow Centre, Half Moon Theatre, and Apples and Snakes.

Azad is a trustee of Rich Mix in Shoreditch, founder chair of Bishwo Shahitto Kendro (World Literature Centre UK) in London. She is part of the East storytelling group, which invites local residents to join in sharing some of the stories brought together by the Eastend's rich, diverse history of immigration.

== Awards ==
- Bichitra Award, 1994
- Year of the Artist from London Arts, 2000
- Sonjojon- A Rouf Award, 2004
- UK Civic Award, 2004
- Community Champions Award by Canary Wharf group PLC, 2014
- Syed Waliullah Literature Award conferred by the Bangla Academy, 2016.

== Personal life ==
Azad lives in Wanstead, Redbridge, London.

== Works ==
=== Novel and stories ===
Year	Title
1988	Shirno Shuktara
1989	Dui Romonir Moddhoshomoy
1991	Arekjon
2003	Shamim Azader Golpo Shonkolon
2009	A Vocal Chorus
2012	Priongboda
2018	Bongshobeej

=== Poetry ===
Year	Title
1983	Valobashar Kobita
1984	Sporsher Opekkha
1988	He Jubok Tomar Vobisshot
2007	Om
2008	Jiol Jokhom
2010	Jonmandho Jupiter
2011	Shamim Azader Prem Opremer 100 Kobita

=== Children's literature and drama ===
Year	Title
1992	Hopscotch Ghost (with Mary Cooper)
1994	The Raft
2000	The Life of Mr. Aziz
2012	Boogly The Burgundy Cheetah

=== Poetry collections and translations ===
Year	Title
1998	British South Asian Poetry
2001	My Birth Was Not in Vain
2003	Velocity (25 Bochorer Bileter Kobita)
2008	The Majestic Night
