= Ministry of Social Welfare (Bangladesh) =

Government ministry of Bangladesh

- সমাজকল্যাণ মন্ত্রণালয়
- Government Seal of Bangladesh

Ministry overview
- Formed: 20 January 1972; 54 years ago
- Jurisdiction: Government of Bangladesh
- Headquarters: Bangladesh Secretariat, Segunbagicha, Dhaka
- Annual budget: ৳30443 crore (US$2.5 billion) (2026-2027)
- Minister responsible: A. Z. M. Zahid Hossain
- Minister of State responsible: Farzana Sharmin
- Ministry executive: Dr. Mohammad Abu Yusuf, Senior Secretary
- Child agencies: Department of Social Services; Bangladesh National Social Welfare Council; National Disabled Development Foundation
- Website: msw.gov.bd

The Ministry of Social Welfare (Bengali: সমাজকল্যাণ মন্ত্রণালয়, romanized: Samājakalyāṇa mantraṇālaẏa) is the government ministry of Bangladesh responsible for the programs and the provision of social, rehabilitative services to improve the physical, social, emotional and economic well-being of the disadvantaged groups.

The Ministry looks after human resources development, poverty alleviation, welfare, development and empowerment of the backward and backward communities of Bangladesh. In order to introduce Bangladesh as a welfare state, the Ministry of Social Welfare is implementing old age allowance, widow allowance, disability allowance, acid burn and disabled persons assistance programs etc. It is implementing multi-dimensional and intensive activities for the welfare and development of homeless, socially, intellectually and physically handicapped persons, poor, helpless patients and vulnerable children. These activities have been undertaken with the aim of achieving the goals stated in the Sustainable Development Goals (SDGs), Vision 2021 and the Seventh Five Year Plan.

== Directorates ==
- Department of Social Services
- National Disabled Development Foundation
- Bangladesh National Social Welfare Council

== See also ==
- Minister of Social Welfare (Bangladesh)
