= Iqbalur Rahim =

Bangladeshi politician

- ইকবালুর রহিম

Member of the Bangladesh Parliament for Dinajpur-3
- In office 25 January 2009 – 6 August 2024
- Preceded by: Khurshid Jahan
- Succeeded by: Syed Jahangir Alam

Personal details
- Born: 16 August 1965 (age 60)
- Party: Awami League
- Parent: M. Abdur Rahim (father)
- Relatives: M Enayetur Rahim (brother)

Iqbalur Rahim (born 16 August 1965) is a Bangladesh Awami League politician and a former Jatiya Sangsad member representing the Dinajpur-3 constituency during 2009–2024.

== Career ==
Iqbal was elected to the parliament from Dinajpur-3 in 2008 as a Bangladesh Awami candidate. He was re-elected on 5 January 2014 from Dinajpur-3.

Iqbal laid the foundation stone of a bridge over the Dhepa River in Dinajpur on 23 October 2011. Then on 10 November 2011, Khalid Mahmud Chowdhury, member of parliament from Dinajpur-2, laid the foundation stone on the other side. On 15 February 2014, he visited Hindu families in Chirirbandar Upazila, Dinajpur District, attacked by members of Jamaat-e-Islami Bangladesh, Islami Chhatra Shibir, and Bangladesh Nationalist Party following the 5 January 2014 General Elections in Bangladesh. He is a whip in the parliament of Bangladesh.

In August 2024, the Anti-Corruption Commission of Bangladesh decided to investigate the allegations of corruption brought against Iqbal after the fall of the Sheikh Hasina-led Awami League government. Two murder cases were filed against him and his brother, including one by a leader of the Bangladesh Jatiotabadi Jubo Dal.

== Award ==
World Leadership Federation (WLF), a global platform based in India, has nominated Iqbal, the whip of the Bangladesh Parliament, for the WLF Award-2017 for his outstanding contribution to social services. The WLF has decided to give him the award in the social innovator category, and the award will be handed over to Iqbalur Rahim on 23 February at a gala event in Dubai. The federation has chosen Iqbalur Rahim, a ruling Bangladesh Awami League lawmaker elected from Dinajpur, to construct and maintain a shelter house "Manab Palli", for transsexuals under his constituency.

== Personal life ==
Iqbal's father, M. Abdur Rahim, was a Jatiya Sangsad member from the same constituency and a famous politician from Dinajpur who was awarded the Independence Day Award. His only brother, M Enayetur Rahim, is a justice on the Appellate Division of the Bangladesh Supreme Court.
