= Jatiya Ganamukti Union =

The Jatiya Ganamukti Union (National People's Liberation Union) was a Bangladeshi political party created in 1973 by veteran communist leader Haji Mohammad Danesh, who had been a major activist in the Tebhaga movement. It was merged by Danesh into the ruling Bangladesh Krishak Sramik Awami League (BAKSAL) in 1975, after the government of president Sheikh Mujibur Rahman outlawed all other parties. After the downfall of the Mujib regime, the JGU was revived by Danesh until 1980, when he left it to form the Ganatantrik Party.
