= National Disabled Development Foundation =

- Formation: 1999
- Headquarters: Dhaka, Bangladesh
- Region served: Bangladesh
- Official language: Bengali
- Website: www.jpuf.gov.bd

The National Disabled Development Foundation (Bengali: জাতীয় প্রতিবন্ধী উন্নয়ন ফাউন্ডেশন), also known as Jatiyo Protibondhi Unnayan Foundation, is a government agency responsible for the welfare of disabled people in Bangladesh and is located in Dhaka, Bangladesh. It is under the Ministry of Social Welfare.

== History ==
On 3 December 1997, Prime Minister Sheikh Hasina declared the intention to form a foundation to look after the welfare of disabled people on the occasion of the International Day of Persons with Disabilities. The National Disabled Development Foundation was established on 16 November 1999 by the government of Bangladesh. The foundation was restructured by the Fakhruddin Ahmed-led caretaker government in 2007. The Bangladesh Awami League government cancelled the reformation and restructure process on 26 May 2016. The government of Bangladesh passed the Rights and Protection of Persons with Disabilities Act in 2013 to protect disabled individuals. The foundation operates specialized schools for disabled students in Bangladesh.
