= Syed Jahangir Alam =

Bangladesh politician

- সৈয়দ জাহাঙ্গীর আলম
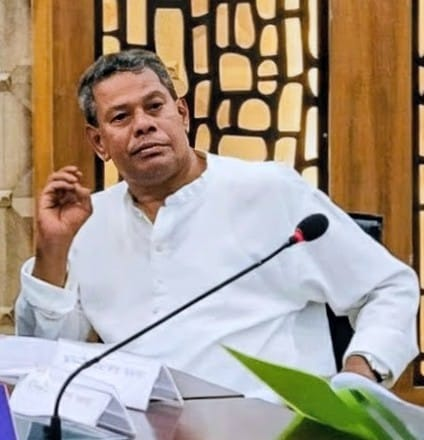
- Syed Jahangir in 2026

Member of Parliament
- Incumbent
- Assumed office 17 February 2026
- Preceded by: Iqbalur Rahim
- Constituency: Dinajpur-3

Personal details
- Born: 24 February 1967 (age 59) Balubari,Dinajpur
- Citizenship: Bangladesh
- Party: Bangladesh Nationalist Party
- Spouse: Nur Shamima Begum
- Children: Syed Yasin Alam, Unnamed daughter
- Education: Dinajpur Zilla School
- Profession: Politician,Businessman

Syed Jahangir Alam is a Bangladeshi politician who currently serves as an executive member of the central committee of the Bangladesh Nationalist Party and as a Member of Parliament from Dinajpur-3 (Sadar) constituency.

He was also previously elected as the Mayor of Dinajpur Municipality for three consecutive terms and served in that role.

== Early life and education ==
Syed Jahangir Alam was born on 24 February 1967 in Balubari, an area in the Dinajpur district of Bangladesh. He completed his secondary education at Dinajpur Zilla School, where he obtained his Secondary School Certificate (SSC). He then pursued higher secondary studies at Dinajpur Adarsha College, earning his Higher Secondary Certificate (HSC). After which he received his Bachelor of commerce degree from Dinajpur Government College under the supervision of Rajshahi University

Details about his family background and early influences are unknown.

== Political Career ==
Syed Jahangir Alam began his political involvement with the Bangladesh Nationalist Party (BNP). In his student years he was closely involved with the student wing of BNP the Jatiyatabadi Chhatradal.In his early years during the 1990 Bangladesh Mass uprising,he became the convener of the Dinajpur district All-Party Student Unity of the Anti-Ershad movement. After which he quickly rose through the ranks of Chattradal progressively becoming the president and later the secretary of Dinajpur district Chhatradal. His journey in the primary wing of BNP started after he was nominated to be the Office Secretary of Dinajpur District BNP. He also served as the Youth Affairs Secretary of said wing. He was also part of the Jatiotabadi Secchashebak Dal holding the position of Convenor of the district committee and vice president of the central committee. Later in his political career he was nominated to be the Co-oraganizer Secretary of the Rangpur division BNP. As of 2026 he is known to be an executive member of the BNP central committee.

Syed Jahangir was elected Mayor of Dinajpur Municipality for three consecutive terms between 2011 and 2023 where he focused on local development initiatives, municipal administration, and community services. His tenure as mayor established him as a prominent political figure in Dinajpur.

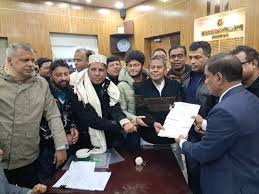
nomination

In February 2026, he was elected as the Member of Parliament (MP) for Dinajpur‑3, defeating his closest opponent by 4,589 votes. He represented the BNP in the 13th national parliamentary election. As an MP, he continues to advocate for development projects and political engagement in his constituency.

== Personal life ==
Syed Jahangir Alam is married to Nur Shamima Begum. The couple has two children, including a son named Syed Yasin Alam; the name of their daughter has not been widely publicized.

Outside of politics, Jahangir Alam is also involved in business.
