= Musammat Nazmanara Khanum =

Member, Bangladesh Public Service Commission
- Incumbent
- Assumed office 17 May 2023
- Appointed by: President of Bangladesh

Personal details
- Born: 9 June 1962 (age 64) Jessore District, Bangladesh
- Profession: Government official

Musammat Nazmanara Khanum is a Bangladeshi retired government official and former secretary of the Ministry of Food. She is currently a member of the Bangladesh Public Service Commission.

== Early life ==
Khanum was born in June 1962 in Jessore District, East Pakistan, Pakistan. She has a bachelors in agriculture and a masters in plant pathology. She did her PhD in food nutrition from Japan.

== Career ==
Khanum joined the Bangladesh Civil Service in 1989. She served as an assistant commissioner and Upazila Nirbahi Officer.

Khanum was the Deputy Commissioner and District Magistrate of Naogaon District in 2010. She served as the Divisional Commissioner of Sylhet Division. She was the first woman Divisional Commissioner of Bangladesh. She was made the Director General of Directorate General of Food on 27 May 2019.

On 19 December 2019, Khanum was appointed secretary of the Ministry of Food. In April 2020, she stopped the Open Market Sale of subsidized essentials to stop the spread of COVID-19. She introduced letter based grading food quality and hyenine in restaurants and cafes in Bangladesh. She saw the import of 100 thousand ton of rice from Myanmar.

In April 2022, Khanum visited the Centre for Food Policy of the City, University of London. She is a member of the advisory board of the Japanese Universities Alumni Association in Bangladesh. She was the president of the Bangladesh Civil Service Women Network. She retired in May 2023.

In May 2023, Khanum was appointed a member of the Bangladesh Public Service Commission along with Helal Uddin Ahmed, Shafiqul Islam, and Md Muksodur Rahman Patwary.
