= Bazlul Haque Khondker =

Bangladeshi economist

Bazlul Haque Khondker is a Bangladeshi economist and professor of the Department of Economics at the University of Dhaka. He is the Chairperson of the South Asian Network on Economic Modeling (SANEM). He is the vice-chairperson of Research and Policy Integration for Development (RAPID). He is a director of Policy Research Institute of Bangladesh.

Khondker is a member of the Bangladesh Economic Association.

== Biography ==
Khondker was born on 11 February 1964. He completed his master's degree in Quantitative Development Economics and PhD at the University of Warwick.

From 2014 to 2015, Khondker was working for the Ministry of Labour, Invalids and Social Affairs of Vietnam and the United Nations Development Program.

Khondker was working at the Ministry of Family, Labour and Social Protection of Mongolia in 2015 on behalf of Asian Development Bank.

Khondker estimated 49 percent of all remittance in Bangladesh came through illegal channels. He called for an increase in social safety net payments in 2023.

== Bibliography ==
- Welfare and Poverty Impacts of Tariff Reforms in Bangladesh (2018)
- Implications of WTO Agreements and Domestic Trade Policy Reforms for Poverty in Bangladesh (2018)
- Poverty, Intra-household Distribution and Gender Relations in Bangladesh (2011)
- MDG Financing Strategy for Bangladesh (2011)
- Implications of Wto Agreements and Domestic Trade Policy Reforms for Poverty in Bangladesh (2007)
