= Amzad Hossain (Dinajpur politician) =

Bangladeshi politician

Member of Parliament for Dinajpur-7
- In office 1973–1976

Member of Parliament for Dinajpur-3
- In office 1986–1988
- Preceded by: Rezwanul Haque
- Succeeded by: Mokhlesur Rahman

Personal details
- Died: 9 May 2005
- Party: Bangladesh Awami League

Amzad Hossain (died 9 May 2005) was a politician from Dinajpur District of Bangladesh. He was elected a member of parliament for Dinajpur-7 and Dinajpur-3.

== Career ==
Hossain was elected to parliament for Dinajpur-7 as a Awami League candidate in 1973. He was elected to parliament for Dinajpur-3 as a Awami League candidate in 1986.
