= Mostafizur Rahman (judge) =

Bangladeshi Judge

Md Mostafizur Rahman

Justice of the High Court Division of Bangladesh
- Incumbent
- Assumed office 26 September 1984

Personal details
- Born: 13 February 1959 (age 67)
- Education: University of Rajshahi
- Profession: Judge

Md Mostafizur Rahman is a justice of the High Court Division of the Bangladesh Supreme Court.

== Early life ==
Mostafizur Rahman was born on 13 February 1959. He has a Bachelor of Law from the University of Rajshahi.

== Career ==
Mostafizur Rahman became a lawyer in the district court on 26 September 1984.

Mostafizur Rahman joined the judicial branch of the Bangladesh Civil Service on 15 January 1985 as a munsif.

On 8 September 2011, Mostafizur Rahman was promoted to district judge.

Mostafizur Rahman was alleviated to an additional judge of the High Court Division on 31 May 2018. In September, Mostafizur Rahman and Justice Borhanuddin ordered the government of Bangladesh to provide first class division status to photographer Shahidul Alam in prison.

Mostafizur Rahman and Justice M Enayetur Rahim doubled the sentence of former prime minister Khaleda Zia from five to ten years in the Zia Orphanage Trust corruption case. In July 2019, Mostafizur Rahman and Justice M Enayetur Rahim ordered judges of the lower court not to add doctor or barrister before their name when writing the verdict calling its usage an example of “superiority complex”. On 8 August 2019, Mostafizur Rahman and Sheikh Md. Zakir Hossain denied bail to Aysha Siddika Minni who had been arrested on charges of being involved in the murder of her husband, Rifat Sharif.

President Md Abdul Hamid made Mostafizur Rahman a permanent judge of the High Court Division on 30 May 2020. On 10 December 2020, Mostafizur Rahman and Justice M Enayetur Rahim granted bail to Dilip Khalko, a convicted rapist, after he married the victim, who was his cousin and 14 when she became pregnant after rape. Mostafizur Rahman and Justice M Enayetur Rahim questioned why Md Muksodur Rahman Patwary, secretary of the Ministry of Land, was still holding his office after he admitted illegally using government cars, hiding car loan information and withdrawing 50 thousand BDT as car allowance, and defended himself by saying other government officials were doing the same.

Mostafizur Rahman and Justice M Enayetur Rahim granted bail to cartoonist Ahmed Kabir Kishore in March 2021 after ten months in pretrial detention in a Digital Security Act case. He co-accused writer Mushtaq Ahmed died in custody. On 26 August 2021, Mostafizur Rahman and M Enayetur Rahim in a verdict declared that the Anti-Corruption Commission does not have the authority to freeze suspect's assets or bank accounts without the explicit authorization of the courts. The verdict was given in a petition filed by a pharmacy owner in Cox's Bazar District whose accounts in Social Islami Bank Limited were frozen on the orders of Md Sharif Uddin, assistant director of the Anti-Corruption Commission in Chittagong. In September 2021, Mostafizur Rahman and Justice M Enayetur Rahim suspended the bail of deputy inspector general Partha Gopal Banik and criticized Special Judge Court-5's Judge Md Iqbal Hossain for granting a secret bail to Banik, who had arrested with 8 million BDT from his home. It sought an explanation from the judge. Mostafizur Rahman and Justice M Enayetur Rahim rejected a petition that called for the Bangladesh High Court to direct the government to protect private phone conversations from being intercepted and recorded illegally on 29 September 2021. In November, Mostafizur Rahman and Justice M Enayetur Rahim ordered the killing of elephants in Bangladesh and stop encroachment on elephant habitats.
