= Khurshid Jahan =

Bangladeshi politician (1939–2006)

Minister of Women and Children Affairs
- In office 10 October 2001 – 14 June 2006
- Prime Minister: Khaleda Zia
- Preceded by: Zinnatunnessa Talukdar
- Succeeded by: Shirin Sharmin Chaudhury

Member of Parliament
- In office 23 June 1996 – 28 October 2006
- Preceded by: M. Abdur Rahim
- Succeeded by: Iqbalur Rahim
- Constituency: Dinajpur-3
- In office 20 March 1991 – 30 March 1996
- Succeeded by: Srimati Bharati Nandi (Sarkar)
- Constituency: Women's Seat-1

Personal details
- Born: 11 August 1939 Dinajpur, Bengal Province, British India
- Died: 14 June 2006 (aged 66) Dhaka, Bangladesh
- Party: Bangladesh Nationalist Party
- Relations: Khaleda Zia (sister); Ziaur Rahman (brother-in-law)
- Children: Shahriar Haque Don
- Parents: Iskandar Majumder (father); Taiyaba Majumder (mother)
- Relatives: See Majumder–Zia family
- Education: Kumudini College
- Occupation: Politician

Begum Khurshida Jahan Haq (11 August 1939 – 14 June 2006) was a Bangladeshi politician who served as the Minister of Women's and Children's Affairs of Bangladesh from 2001 to 2006, serving under her sister, Prime Minister Khaleda Zia. During her term in office, she worked to curb human trafficking of women and children in Bangladesh, as well as to provide programs and services to rehabilitate former victims of human trafficking.

== Early life and education ==
Khurshid Jahan Haq was born on 11 August 1939 in Balaburi, in the Dinajpur District of the Bengal Presidency. She belonged to a Bengali Muslim family with origins in Fulgazi, Feni District. She was the daughter of tea-businessman Iskandar Ali Majumder, who was in turn the son of Salamat Ali Majumdar, who was the son of Azgar Ali Majumdar, who was the son of Nahar Muhammad Khan, who was the son of Murad Khan, a 16th-century Middle Eastern immigrant. Her mother, Taiyaba Majumder, was from Chandbari (now in Uttar Dinajpur District).

After matriculation from the local schools, she attended Kumudini College where she received a BA degree in 1958. During her college years, she was active in student government and served as Secretary of the Students' Union in 1956–57.

== Career ==
Jahan served as a vice-chairman of Bangladesh Nationalist Party, and in 1991 was named as a Member of Parliament (MP) in the reserved seat for women. She was later twice re-elected as MP from the Dinajpur-3 constituency, in 1996 and 2001. She was given the position of Minister of Women's and Children's Affairs on 10 October 2001, and held the position until her death in 2006.
