= Mohammad Fazlul Karim (politician) =

Bangladeshi politician

- মোহাম্মদ ফজলুল করিম

Member of Parliament
- In office 7 March 1973 – 6 November 1975
- Preceded by: Position Established
- Succeeded by: Rezwanul Haque
- Constituency: Dinajpur-3

Personal details
- Born: 27 March 1927 Thakurgaon District, Bengal Presidency, British India (now Bangladesh)
- Died: 9 January 2015 (aged 87) Thakurgaon District, Rangpur Division, Bangladesh
- Party: Bangladesh Awami League

Mohammad Fazlul Karim (27 March 1927 - 9 January 2015) is a Bangladesh Awami League politician and a former member of parliament for Dinajpur-3.

== Early life and education ==
Karim was born on 27 March 1927 in present-day Thakurgaon District, Bangladesh to Naimuddin Ahmed and Satijan Nessa. He passed matriculation from Thakurgaon Government Boys High School in 1946. He completed his intermediate from Maulana Azad College. He obtained his Bachelor of Arts degree from the same college in 1950.

== Career ==
Karim was elected to parliament from Dinajpur-3 as a Bangladesh Awami League candidate in 1973.
