= Bangladesh National Social Welfare Council =

Government agency

- Formation: 1972
- Headquarters: Dhaka, Bangladesh
- Region served: Bangladesh
- Official language: Bengali
- Website: Bangladesh National Social Welfare Council

Bangladesh National Social Welfare Council (বাংলাদেশ জাতীয় সমাজকল্যাণ পরিষদ) is the national council responsible for carrying out social welfare activities and programs in Bangladesh. It is located in Dhaka, Bangladesh.

== History ==
Bangladesh National Social Welfare Council traces its origins to Social Welfare Council in 1956 to look after the welfare of Biharis who moved to East Pakistan after the Partition of India. After Bangladesh became an independent country in 1971, the council was founded through a resolution in parliament and renamed Bangladesh Social Welfare Council. It was placed under the Ministry of Labour and Social Welfare. In November 2008, Special Assistant for Telecommunications to the Chief Adviser of the Caretaker government of Bangladesh, Brigadier General M. A. Malek inaugurated the website of Bangladesh National Social Welfare Council. Non-government organisations are registered with the council.
