= M. Abdur Rahim =

Bangladeshi politician

Member of Parliament from Dinajpur-3
- In office 1991–1996
- Preceded by: Mokhlesur Rahman
- Succeeded by: Khurshid Jahan

Personal details
- Born: 21 November 1927 Dinajpur District, East Bengal, British Raj
- Died: 4 September 2016 (aged 88) BIRDEM, Dhaka, Bangladesh
- Party: Bangladesh Awami League
- Education: University of Rajshahi, University of Dhaka
- Awards: Independence Day Award (2018)

M. Abdur Rahim (21 November 1927 – 4 September 2016) was a Bangladesh Awami League politician and the Member of Parliament from Dinajpur-3. He was awarded Independence Day Award in 2018 posthumously by the Government of Bangladesh.

== Early life and education ==
Abdur Rahim was born on 21 November 1927 in Dinajpur District, East Bengal, British Raj. In 1954 he worked in the election campaign of Huseyn Shaheed Suhrawardy. After completing high school from Carmichael College, he graduated from Rajshahi University. Later he earned an LLB degree from University of Dhaka.

== Role in the War of Liberation ==
After the invasion of Pakistani army in Dinajpur in 1971, the liberation war committee was formed in the Dinajpur District, Bangladesh. Abdur Rahim was invited as the convener. After the formation of Mujibnagar government, he was appointed Chairman of West Zone-1. At that time he led some direct war against the Pakistani army during the liberation war. At that time, the military tribunal imposed a prison sentence on him for sedition. Abdur Rahim served as the chairman of relief and rehabilitation committee after the liberation of the Greater Dinajpur area after the liberation war began.

== Career ==
Abdur Rahim worked in the defence team in the Agartala Conspiracy case. He was elected to the East Pakistan Provincial Assembly in 1970. During the Bangladesh Liberation war in 1971 he served as the chairman of the west zone under the Mujibnagar government. There were over 100 relief and Mukti Bahini camps under the West zone. After the Independence of Bangladesh he worked in the committee to draft the constitution of Bangladesh and served as the President of Dinajpur District of Bangladesh Awami League. He was also the President of Dinajpur District Awami League, Dinajpur District Bar Association and member of Bangladesh Awami League central committee. He was elected to Parliament in 1991 from Dinajpur-3.

== Personal life ==
Abdur Rahim had two sons Justice, M Enayetur Rahim and Member of Parliament Iqbalur Rahim, and four daughters.

== Death and legacy ==
Abdur Rahim died on 4 September 2016 in BIRDEM, Dhaka, Bangladesh. His son, Iqbalur Rahim, is a Member of Parliament from his constituency of Dinajpur-3 and a parliamentary whip. On 13 April 2017, Dinajpur Medical College was renamed to M Abdur Rahim Medical College and Hospital. He was awarded the Independence Day Award posthumously by the Government of Bangladesh for his role in the Bangladesh Liberation war.
