= Haji Mohammad Danesh =

Bangladeshi politician

Hajee Mohammad Danesh
- হাজী মোহাম্মদ দানেশ

Member of the East Pakistan Provincial Assembly
- In office 1954–1958

Personal details
- Born: 27 June 1900 Sultanpur, Dinajpur, Bengal Presidency
- Died: 28 June 1986 (aged 86) Dhaka, Bangladesh
- Resting place: near Gor-E-Shahid Eidgah Maidan
- Party: Jatiya Party; Ganatantrik Party
- Other political affiliations: BAKSAL; Jatiya Ganamukti Union; National Awami Party; Ganatantri Dal; Muslim League; Kisan Sabha; Communist Party
- Children: Sultana Rezwan Chowdhury
- Education: Aligarh Muslim University
- Profession: Politician, lawyer, and teacher
- Known for: leader of Tebhaga movement

Hajee Mohammad Danesh (1900 – 28 June 1986) was a Bangladeshi politician and communist activist born in British India.

== Early life ==
Hajee Mohammad Danesh was born to a Bengali Muslim peasant family in the village of Sultanpur in the Dinajpur district of what was then the Bengal Presidency of British India, and now a part of Bangladesh. Danesh studied at the Aligarh Muslim University, where he obtained a master's degree in history in 1931. He also earned a degree in law in 1932 and joined the bar of the Dinajpur district court.

== Communist activism ==
In the 1930s, Danesh became active in the communist organisations of Bengal, especially the Bengal provincial organisation of the Communist Party of India. He was arrested twice, in 1938 and 1942, by the government of Bengal for his participation in the Tebhaga movement, an agitation in northern Bengal against zamindars (landlords) and in support of landless peasants and sharecroppers who sought a greater share of the yield, most of which they had to surrender to the zamindars. Danesh was one of the few Muslim communist leaders of the struggle, and worked to mobilise the Muslim peasantry in favour of the movement. In 1945, he joined the All India Muslim League, but was later expelled for his participation in the continuing Tebagha movement, and re-arrested by the Bengal government in 1946. After the partition of India and Bengal in 1947, Danesh remained in his home district of Dinajpur, which fell in Muslim-majority East Bengal, which became part of the newly created Muslim state of Pakistan. Danesh briefly left active politics, to work as a professor of law at the Dinajpur Surendranath College.

== Political career ==
In January 1953, Danesh rejoined mainstream politics of East Bengal (also known as East Pakistan) by forming the Ganatantri Dal (Democratic Party). The party joined the multi-party United Front under the leadership of A. K. Fazlul Huq, which swept the provincial elections in East Bengal, defeating the ruling Muslim League. Danesh was elected to the East Bengal legislature. After the central government dismissed the United Front government, Danesh was arrested by police and released in 1956. In 1957, he merged the Ganatantri Dal into the new National Awami Party (NAP), formed by veteran socialist leader Maulana Abdul Hamid Khan Bhashani. He was elected vice-president and later the general secretary of the NAP.

In 1958, Danesh was arrested after martial law was declared by the military regime of Ayub Khan. Danesh became a prominent critic of the Ayub Khan regime, attacking its suppression of democracy and for what he saw to be its pro-United States policies. As vice-president of the NAP, Danesh opposed the six-point demand for autonomy for East Bengal put forth by the leader of the Awami League, Sheikh Mujibur Rahman. He criticized the six-points for autonomy as not addressing the issues and concerns of the peasants of East Bengal, and also claimed the existence of separatist designs aimed to separate East Pakistan from West Pakistan. Danesh later resigned from the NAP, protesting against the leadership of Maulana Bhashani and specifically criticizing what Danesh perceived to be Bhashani's reluctance to agitate against the Ayub military regime. Danesh's resignation was followed by the departure of many other leading NAP activists.

In post-independence Bangladesh, Danesh formed the Jatiya Ganamukti Union (JGU) in 1973. However, when all political parties except the ruling Bangladesh Krishak Sramik Awami League (BAKSAL) of president Sheikh Mujibur Rahman were banned, he joined BAKSAL and became a member of the central committee. He revived the JGU in 1976 but abolished it again in 1980 to form the Ganatantrik Party. This party was amalgamated with the Jatiya Party of the then-president Gen. Hussain Muhammad Ershad in 1986.

== Death and legacy ==
Hajee Mohammad Danesh died on 28 June 1986, in Dhaka. The Agricultural Extension Training Institute was renamed in his honor as the Hajee Mohammad Danesh Science and Technology University.
