= Muhammad Samad =

- মুহাম্মদ সামাদ

Pro-Vice Chancellor of the University of Dhaka
- In office 27 May 2018 – 26 August 2024
- Preceded by: Dr. Mohammed Akhtaruzzaman
- Succeeded by: Sayema Haque Bidisha

Vice-chancellor of the University of Information Technology and Sciences
- In office 2012–2016

Personal details
- Born: 1958 (age 67–68) Jamalpur, East Pakistan, Pakistan
- Awards: See full list

Muhammad Samad (born 1958) is a Bangladeshi academic, administrator and poet. He was the former Pro-Vice Chancellor the University of Dhaka.

Samad was awarded Ekushey Padak (language and literature) in 2024 and Bangla Academy Literary Award in 2020 for his contribution to poetry.

== Birth and Education ==
Samad was born in 1958 in Sharishabari, Jamalpur district. He earned his BSS degree from the Institute of Social Welfare and Research of Dhaka University.

== Career ==
he serves as the president of Jatiya Kabita Parishad (National Poetry Council). Between 1997 and 2001, he was the general secretary of this council. His published collections of poetry include Ekjan Rajnaitik Netar Manifesto, Aami Noi Indrajit Megher Araley, Porabey Chandan Kath, Cholo, Tumul Brishtitey Bhiji, Sharater Akashey Purnima and Premer Kabita.

Samad was a visiting professor at Winona State University in Minnesota.

From 2012 to 2016, Samad was the Vice-Chancellor of the University of Information Technology and Sciences. In May 2018, he was appointed pro-vice chancellor of the University of Dhaka replacing Dr Akhtaruzzaman.

He has been serving as president of Bangladesh Council for Social Work Education (BCSWE) since 2012 and was elected Board Member of Asian and Pacific Social Work Education (APASWE) for the term of 2013-17.

After the fall of the Sheikh Hasina led Awami League government, the Ministry of Education removed Samad and replaced him with Sayema Haque Bidisha.

== Awards ==
- Trivuj Literary Award
- Poet Jasimuddin Literary Award
- Poet Jibanananda Das Award
- Poet Sukanta Literary Award
- City-Ananda Alo Literary Award
- Syed Mujtaba Ali Sahitya Award
- Poet Vishnu De Award
- Kabitalap Award
- International Best Poet (China)
- Bangla Academy Literary Award (2020)
- Ekushey Padak, 2024
