= Ganatantrik Party =

The Ganatantrik Party (Democratic Party) was a Bangladeshi political party formed in 1980 by the veteran communist leader Haji Mohammad Danesh, a leader of the Tebhaga movement. Shortly before Danesh's death in 1986, the party merged into the ruling Jatiya Party of the then-Bangladeshi President Gen. Hussain Muhammad Ershad.
