= Zeenat Huda =

Bangladeshi academic and sociologist

Academic background
- Education: University of Dhaka; University of Warwick
- Thesis: (2005)

Academic work
- Institutions: University of Dhaka; Bangladesh University of Engineering and Technology

Zeenat Huda is a Bangladeshi academic and sociologist, who served as a professor in the Department of Sociology at the University of Dhaka.

== Early life and education ==
Huda completed her Bachelor and Master of Social Science in Sociology from the University of Dhaka in 1990 and 1992 respectively. She later obtained a PhD from the School of Sociology at the University of Warwick in 2005. She had received the Bangabandhu Overseas Scholarship for her PhD.

== Career ==
Huda began her academic career as a lecturer at the Bangladesh University of Engineering and Technology in May 1993, serving until May 1996. She joined the Department of Sociology at the University of Dhaka as a professor in July 1996 and served in that role until June 2019.

During her career, she also held several part-time teaching positions, including at the Department of Women and Gender Studies, Institute of Business Administration, Department of History, and Institute of Education and Research at the University of Dhaka, as well as at the Islamic University of Technology.

From December 2017 to June 2019, Huda served as Provost of Rokeya Hall at the University of Dhaka. In September 2023, she signed a statement condemning the jail sentence of human rights activists Adilur Rahman Khan and ASM Nasiruddin Elan. She is a former General Secretary of the Dhaka University Teachers' Association. After the fall of the Sheikh Hasina led Awami League government, the office of the association was vandalized.

Huda supported and participated in the Federation of Bangladesh University Teachers' Association and Dhaka University Teachers' Association strike to protest against the government pension plan for teachers in July 2024.

In March 2025, the Blue panel, an association of the University of Dhaka teachers affiliated with the Bangladesh Nationalist Party and Bangladesh Jamaat-e-Islami, demanded trail of Huda for supporting Sheikh Hasina and Awami League. The statement was signed by Professors Morshed Hasan Khan, Abdus Salam, and Abul Kalam Sarker.

In December 2025, Huda was present during an incident at the University of Dhaka in which students, led by Dhaka University Central Students’ Union Social Welfare Secretary AB Zubair, confronted sociology professor AKM Jamal Uddin over allegations of an unauthorised meeting on campus. Reports stated that Huda accompanied Jamal during the incident, while students alleged that a “secret meeting” had taken place, a claim that was contested by those involved.

In January 2025, the University of Dhaka Syndicate decided to frame charges against Huda and issue a show-cause notice over allegations related to the July uprising that led to the fall of the Sheikh Hasina-led Awami League government. The decision followed recommendations from a university fact-finding committee and a request from the Dhaka University Central Students’ Union. In September 2026, she was suspended by the University of Dhaka.
