= Dinajpur-3 =

Constituency of Bangladesh's Jatiya Sangsad

Coordinates: 25.62°N 88.64°E

- Constituency for the Jatiya Sangsad
- District: Dinajpur District
- Division: Rangpur Division
- Electorate: 415,636 (2026)

Current constituency
- Created: 1973
- Party: Bangladesh Nationalist Party
- Member: Syed Jahangir Alam
- ← 7 Dinajpur-2 9 Dinajpur-4 →

Dinajpur-3 is a constituency represented in the Jatiya Sangsad (National Parliament) of Bangladesh since 2026 by Syed Jahangir Alam of the Bangladesh Nationalist Party.

== Boundaries ==
The constituency encompasses Dinajpur Sadar Upazila.

== History ==
The constituency was created for the first general elections in newly independent Bangladesh, held in 1973.

== Members of Parliament ==
Election	Member	Party
1973	Mohammad Fazlul Karim	Awami League
1979	Rezwanul Haque	Bangladesh Nationalist Party
Major Boundary Changes
1986	Amzad Hossain	Awami League
1988	Mokhlesur Rahman	Jatiya Party
1991	M. Abdur Rahim	Bangladesh Krishak Sramik Awami League
Feb 1996	Khurshid Jahan	Bangladesh Nationalist Party
2001	Khurshid Jahan	Bangladesh Nationalist Party
2008	Iqbalur Rahim	Awami League
2014	Iqbalur Rahim	Awami League
2018	Iqbalur Rahim	Awami League
2024	Iqbalur Rahim	Awami League
2026	Syed Jahangir Alam	Bangladesh Nationalist Party

== Elections ==
=== Elections in the 2020s ===
General election 2026: Dinajpur-3
Party	Candidate	Votes	%	±%
BNP	Syed Jahangir Alam	139,207		N/A
Jamaat	Md. Mainul Alam	134,618		N/A
Majority		4,589		N/A
Turnout				N/A
Registered electors		415,636		
BNP gain from AL				

=== Elections in the 2010s ===
General Election 2014: Dinajpur-3
Party	Candidate	Votes	%	±%
AL	Iqbalur Rahim	96,349	59.1	+5.4
WPB	Mahmudul Hasan Manik	3,327	1.0	N/A
Majority		93,022	93.3	+79.8
Turnout		99,676	31.7	+57.4
AL hold				

=== Elections in the 2000s ===
General Election 2008: Dinajpur-3
Party	Candidate	Votes	%	±%
AL	Iqbalur Rahim	140,934	56.4	+12.9
BNP	Shafiul Alam Prodhan	107,353	43.0	−6.2
BDB	Md. Asraful Islam	638	0.3	N/A
IAB	A. K. M. Lofijuddin Choudhuri	603	0.2	N/A
Majority		33,581	13.5	+2.5
Turnout		249,528	89.1	+5.7
AL gain from BNP				

Khurshid Jahan died in June 2006. To fill the vacant seat, the Election Commission planned a by-election for 7 September. The High Court, however, blocked the by-election on the grounds that it would be wasteful, as the parliament's tenure was due to end in October with the formation of a caretaker government in preparation for the next general election.

General Election 2001: Dinajpur-3
Party	Candidate	Votes	%	±%
BNP	Khurshid Jahan	102,640	51.8	+17.8
AL	M. Abdur Rahim	80,814	40.8	+8.1
IJOF	Mokhlesur Rahman	13,952	7.0	N/A
Bangladesh Janata Party	Fayez Uddin Ahmed	459	0.2	+0.1
WPB	Mahmudul Hasan Manik	293	0.2	0.0
JSD	Md. Abdul Hye	113	0.1	−0.1
Majority		21,826	11.0	+9.7
Turnout		198,271	83.4	+4.6
BNP hold				

=== Elections in the 1990s ===
General Election June 1996: Dinajpur-3
Party	Candidate	Votes	%	±%
BNP	Khurshid Jahan	51,802	34.0	+12.8
AL	M. Abdur Rahim	49,857	32.7	N/A
JP(E)	Mokhlesur Rahman	34,931	22.9	−0.1
Jamaat	Muzibur Rahman	13,396	8.8	−7.2
IOJ	Md. Rustam Ali	607	0.4	N/A
Gano Forum	Khatibuddin Ahmed	589	0.4	N/A
JSD	M. Golam Rahman	287	0.2	N/A
WPB	Md. Rafiqul Amin	257	0.2	N/A
Jatiya Samajtantrik Dal-JSD	Imamul Islam	189	0.1	−0.1
Zaker Party	Md. Shaker Ullah	166	0.1	−0.4
Independent	Md. Motahar Hossain	123	0.1	N/A
Bangladesh Janata Party	Fayez Uddin Ahmed	81	0.1	N/A
Majority		1,945	1.3	−13.4
Turnout		152,285	78.8	+15.8
BNP gain from BAKSAL				

General Election 1991: Dinajpur-3
Party	Candidate	Votes	%	±%
BAKSAL	M. Abdur Rahim	44,784	37.8	
JP(E)	Mokhlesur Rahman	27,318	23.0	
BNP	M. A. Jalil	25,109	21.2	
Jamaat	Md. Abul Kashem	18,969	16	
Independent	Amzad Hossain	703	0.6	
Zaker Party	M. A. Towab	550	0.5	
Jatiya Ganatantrik Party	Md. Aminul Haq	394	0.3	
Jatiya Samajtantrik Dal-JSD	Imamul Islam	273	0.2	
FP	Syed Zakir Hossein	148	0.1	
Independent	Md. Siddiqur Rahman	127	0.1	
JSD (S)	Md. Abdur Rahim Sarkar	93	0.1	
Independent	Syed Sharafat Hossein	88	0.1	
Majority		17,466	14.7	
Turnout		118,556	63.0	
BAKSAL gain from JP(E)				
