= Sayema Haque Bidisha =

Sayema Haque Bidisha is a Bangladeshi academic, professor of economics, and the pro-vice chancellor (administration) of the University of Dhaka. She is the former Research Director at the South Asian Network on Economic Modelling.

== Early life and education ==
Bidisha did her bachelor's and master's in economics at the University of Dhaka in 1997 and 1998 respectively. She did another master's in economics at the University of Bath in 2003. She completed her PhD at the University of Nottingham in 2009.

== Career ==
Bidisha was a Research Analyst at the World Bank from 1 December 2000 to 1 July 2002. She joined the University of Dhaka as a lecturer in 2003. She was promoted to Assistant Professor in 2009.

In December 2013, Bidisha was promoted to Assistant Professor. She was a visiting scholar at the University of Concordia in 2014. From 2016 to 2024, she was the Research Director at the South Asian Network on Economic Modelling.

Bidisha was promoted to professor in 2018.

After the fall of the Sheikh Hasina led Awami League government, Bidisha was appointed pro-vice chancellor of the University of Dhaka. She replaced Muhammad Samad who was removed by the Ministry of Education in the face of student protests. She was the convener of the Pohela Boishakh celebration central committee. That year the Mangal Shobhajatra was renamed to Barshabaran Ananda Shobhajatra.
