= M. A. Malek =

Bangladeshi politician

Mohammad Abul Malek

State Minister for Social Welfare
- In office 12 January 2007 – 6 January 2009
- Prime Minister: Fakhruddin Ahmed (Interim)

Minister of Post and Telecommunications
- In office 6 June 2014 – 12 January 2015
- Prime Minister: Sheikh Hasina

Personal details
- Born: 4 February 1948 Barisal, East Bengal, Pakistan
- Died: 8 January 2016 (aged 67) Sydney, Australia

Military service
- Allegiance: Bangladesh; Pakistan (before 1971)
- Branch/service: Bangladesh Army; Pakistan Army
- Years of service: 1968-2003
- Rank: Brigadier General
- Unit: Corps of Engineers
- Commands: Commandant of Engineers Centre and School of Military Engineering; DMI of Army Headquarters; Station Commander, Jessore
- Battles/wars: Bangladesh Liberation War

M. A. Malek was a brigadier general in the Bangladesh Army who served as an assistant to the chief adviser of the caretaker government of Bangladesh with the rank of a state minister.

== Early life and education ==
Malek was born in Barisal, East Bengal, Pakistan (now Bangladesh) on 4 February 1948. His mother died when he was four years old. Malek attended Barisal Zilla School and later enrolled in the Bangladesh University of Engineering and Technology (BUET). In April 1972, Malek married Fatema Khatun Neli. Fatema Khatun died on 16 January 2012. The couple had three children: Israt Malek, Tanzil Malek, and Tanvir Malek.

== Career ==
Malek was a member of the Mukti Bahini and fought in the Bangladesh Liberation War. He served as the chairman of the Bangladesh Power Development Board and as the special assistant of Chief Adviser Fakhruddin Ahmed in the caretaker government during the 2006–2008 Bangladeshi political crisis. He was head of the Ministry of Social Welfare and the Ministry of Post and Telecommunications.

== Death ==
Malek died on 8 January 2016 in Australia.
