= M Enayetur Rahim =

Justice on the Appellate Division of Bangladesh Supreme Court

former Justice of the High Court Division of Bangladesh
- Incumbent
- Assumed office 30 October 1986 - 10 August 2024

Personal details
- Born: August 11, 1960 (age 66)
- Education: University of Dhaka
- Profession: Judge

M Enayetur Rahim (born 11 August 1960) is a retired justice on the Appellate Division of Bangladesh Supreme Court. Earlier, he was justice of the High Court Division, Bangladesh Supreme Court. He also served as the chairman of the International Crimes Tribunal 1. He was the chairman of the Bangladesh Judicial Service Commission.

== Early life and education ==
Enayetur Rahim was born on 11 August 1960 in the district of Dinajpur, Bangladesh. His father, M. Abdur Rahim, was a Bangladesh Awami League politician and the member of parliament from Dinajpur-3, and his mother was Mrs. Nazma Rahim. Enayetur Rahim completed his master's degree in mass communication and journalism and a law degrees from the University of Dhaka.

== Career ==
Enayetur Rahim became a lawyer of the District Courts on 30 October 1986.

On 2 January 1989, Enayetur Rahim became a lawyer on the High Court Division of Bangladesh Supreme Court.

On 15 May 2002, Enayetur Rahim became a lawyer of the Appellate Division of Bangladesh Supreme Court.

Enayetur Rahim was elected as the secretary of the Supreme Court Bar Association in 2005.

Enayetur Rahim became additional attorney general for Bangladesh in January, 2009.

Enayetur Rahim was appointed an additional judge of the High Court Division on 30 June 2009.

Enayetur Rahim was made a permanent judge of the same division on the 6 June 2011.

On 1 August 2013, Enayetur Rahim, Justice M Moazzem Husain, and Justice Quazi Reza Ul-Hoque in a verdict declared the registration of Bangladesh Jamaat-e-Islami as a political party cancelled.

On 23 February 2014, Enayetur Rahim was made the chairperson (head judge) of the International Crimes Tribunal-1.

On 10 December 2020, Enayetur Rahim and Justice Mostafizur Rahman granted bail to Dilip Khalko, a convicted rapist, after he married the victim, who was his cousin and 14 when she became pregnant after rape.

On 26 August 2021, Enayetur Rahim and Justice Md Mostafizur Rahman in a verdict declared that the Anti-Corruption Commission does not have the authority to freeze a suspect's assets or bank accounts without the explicit authorization of the courts. The verdict was given in a petition filed by a pharmacy owner in Cox's Bazar whose accounts in Social Islami Bank Limited were frozen on the orders of Md Sharif Uddin, assistant director of the Anti-Corruption Commission in Chittagong.

On 10 September 2021, Enayetur Rahim and Justice Md Mostafizur Rahman criticized Special Judge Court-5 judge Md Iqbal Hossain for granting bail to Deputy Inspector General of Prison Police Partha Gopal Banik in secret after Banik was arrested with 8 million in cash. Enayetur Rahim and Justice Md Mostafizur Rahman rejected a petition that called for the High Court to direct the state to protect private phone conversations from being intercepted and recorded illegally on 29 September 2021.

On 9 January 2022, Enayetur Rahim was made a judge of the Appellate Division of the Bangladesh Supreme Court. On 10 August 2024, he has resigned in the face of student agitation. Two murder cases were filed against him and his brother, including one by a leader of the Bangladesh Jatiotabadi Jubo Dal.

== Personal life ==
Enayetur Rahim's only brother Iqbalur Rahim is a member of parliament from Dinajpur-3.
