= Feroza Bhaban =

- ফিরোজা ভবন
- Interactive map of the Feroza Bhaban area

General information
- Status: Residential and political
- Location: Road No. 79, Gulshan-2, Dhaka, Bangladesh
- Coordinates: 23°48′09″N 90°24′42″E
- Client: Khaleda Zia

Technical details
- Floor count: 2

The Feroza Bhaban (Bengali: ফিরোজা ভবন, romanized: phirōjā bhabana) was the private residence and a political office associated with Khaleda Zia, former Prime Minister of Bangladesh and chairperson of the Bangladesh Nationalist Party (BNP). It is located at Gulshan, Dhaka, it has served as her principal residence since 2011 following her eviction from her previous residence on Shaheed Mainul Road in 2010. Prime minister Tarique Rahman's personal residence 196, Gulshan Avenue is right beside this house.

In addition to being a residence, Feroza has functioned as a key venue for political activities related to the BNP. Various party meetings, strategic decisions, and engagements with political leaders and foreign diplomats have taken place at this location.

== History ==
In 2010, while serving as Leader of the Opposition, Khaleda Zia was evicted from her long-time residence at 6 Shaheed Mainul Road in the Dhaka Cantonment area by the government led by Prime Minister Sheikh Hasina. The residence had been leased to her at a nominal rate following the assassination of her husband, former President Ziaur Rahman.

Following the eviction, she moved to Feroza in Gulshan-2, which gradually became her primary residence and political base.

Between 2013 and 2015, Khaleda Zia directed various political activities from Feroza, including movements demanding elections under a neutral caretaker government. During this period, opposition-led strikes and blockades were organized, and the BNP boycotted the 2014 general election.

In early 2015, during a period of political unrest, Khaleda Zia remained confined to her Gulshan office area, where restrictions on utilities and movement were reported. During this time, her younger son, Arafat Rahman Koko, died in Malaysia, and his body was later brought to Dhaka.

From 2016 until February 2018, she continued political activities from Feroza until she was convicted in a corruption case and sent to prison.

In 2020, she was released on conditional grounds through an executive order and returned to Feroza. Due to health concerns and the COVID-19 pandemic, her movements remained limited between her residence and Evercare Hospital in Dhaka.

Following political developments in 2024, she resumed limited political engagement. Diplomatic and political figures continued to visit her at Feroza, and it remained an important location for BNP coordination.

In 2025, she traveled abroad for medical treatment and later returned to Bangladesh.

== Current status ==
Feroza is regarded as a significant political residence in Bangladesh due to its long association with Khaleda Zia and activities of the Bangladesh Nationalist Party (BNP). It has hosted numerous political meetings and interactions with national and international figures.

Following the death of Khaleda Zia, the residence continues to be associated with her political legacy and remains an important location in discussions related to BNP politics.

== See also ==
- Bangabhaban
- Ganabhaban
- 196, Gulshan Avenue
- House No. 6, Shaheed Moinul Road
- State Guest House Jamuna
- Hawa Bhaban
- Sudha Sadan
