= House No. 6, Shaheed Moinul Road =

- 6, Shaheed Mainul Road
- Interactive map of the House No. 6, Shaheed Moinul Road area

General information
- Status: Demolished
- Type: Residential building
- Location: No. 6, Shaheed Mainul Road, Dhaka Cantonment, Dhaka, Bangladesh
- Completed: 1970s
- Demolished: 2010
- Client: Ziaur Rahman and Khaleda Zia

House No. 6, Shaheed Moinul Road, was a residential building located in the Dhaka Cantonment. It was the residence of former president of Bangladesh Ziaur Rahman and former prime minister Begum Khaleda Zia.

== History ==
This house was located at No. 6, Shaheed Mainul Road, Dhaka Cantonment, Dhaka, Bangladesh. This house was used as the family residence of Ziaur Rahman, the former president of Bangladesh. After Ziaur Rahman's assassination in 1981, the house was leased for a long period to his wife Khaleda Zia. Ziaur Rahman used to work from this house while he was the army chief. From the Jail Killing Day of 3 November 1975 to the historic 7 November 1975 Bangladeshi coup d'état, he was under house arrest while staying in this house. After that, he was freed from this house as a result of the Sipahi–Janata Revolution and moved to the center of power. He also used to work from this house while he was the president from 1977 to 1981. He did not live in Bangabhaban.

On November 27, 1990—during the final phase of the anti-Ershad movement—a violent attack took place at the Dhaka Cantonment residence (6 Moinul Road) of the then-BNP Chairperson, Begum Khaleda Zia. It is alleged that a group of armed cadres, led by Freedom Party leader Colonel (Retd.) Abdur Rashid, carried out the assault. During the attack, the residence was subjected to extensive vandalism and gunfire. While attempting to protect his mother and confront the attackers, Khaleda Zia's eldest son, Tarique Rahman, sustained severe injuries. He suffered critical blows to his head and body when the attackers targeted him. The killing of physician-leader Dr. Shamsul Alam Khan Milan on the same day, combined with the attack on Khaleda Zia's residence, further inflamed the protesting students and the public, thereby accelerating the downfall of the Ershad government. Although a state of emergency was declared in the country immediately following these events, Ershad was ultimately forced to resign on December 6 in the face of the mass uprising.

=== Lease ===
After independence, Khaleda Zia moved into house number 6 on Shaheed Moinul Road with her husband Ziaur Rahman as Adjutant General from 1972. When Rahman was killed in a failed military coup in Chittagong on May 30, 1981, on June 12, the then interim president Abdus Sattar allotted the house in the cantonment in Khaleda Zia's name.

Begum Zia lived in this house for 38 years from 1972 to 2010. From this house, which is associated with the memory of her husband, she led the anti-dictatorship movement against then president Hussain Muhammad Ershad in the 1990s. She was then elected the first female prime minister of Bangladesh in 1991. She also lived in this house when she was elected prime minister in the 1996 and 2001 elections. She served as prime minister three times from this house. She never moved to Ganabhaban, official residence of Prime Minister of Bangladesh.

After Sheikh Hasina came to power in the 2008 elections, Zia was forcibly evicted from this house on 13 November 2010.

== Khaleda Zia's ouster ==
On November 13, 2010, Khaleda Zia was forcibly evicted from this house by the government and military authorities. Her lease was cancelled on the orders of the Cantonment Board and the government. During the eviction operation, RAB and police were deployed and she was evicted from the house by breaking down the main gate and breaking the door.

Later, during the COVID-19 pandemic, she was released from the hospital under special conditions by the Awami League government and returned to his 'Firoza' house in Gulshan.

Speaking at a meeting in London in October 2023, then Prime Minister Sheikh Hasina made this remark:

(…) I promised that day that I would never have to live in that cantonment again. I would get out the day I got the time. I got out.

== Destruction and reconstruction ==
After the eviction, this historic house was completely demolished. In its place, a modern multi-storey building was constructed, which is used as the residence of the officials of the Bangladesh Army.

== Notable residents ==
- Ziaur Rahman – freedom fighter, founder of Bangladesh Nationalist Party-BNP, former army chief and former president.
- Khaleda Zia – former first lady, former prime minister, former opposition leader and BNP chairperson.
- Tarique Rahman – prime minister, eldest son of Ziaur Rahman and Khaleda Zia, chairman of BNP.
- Arafat Rahman – younger son of Ziaur Rahman and Khaleda Zia.
- Zubaida Rahman – wife of Tarique Rahman.
- Zaima Rahman – daughter of Tarique Rahman.

== See also ==
- Bangabhaban
- Ganabhaban
- 196, Gulshan Avenue
- Feroza Bhaban
- State Guest House Jamuna
- Hawa Bhaban
- Sudha Sadan
