= 196, Gulshan Avenue =

Residence of the prime minister of Bangladesh

- ১৯৬, গুলশান এভিনিউ

General information
- Status: Residential and political
- Location: 196, Gulshan Avenue, Dhaka, Dhaka, Bangladesh
- Coordinates: 23°48′10″N 90°24′41″E
- Owner: Zia Family

Technical details
- Floor count: 1

The 196, Gulshan Avenue is the personal residence of Tarique Rahman, the Prime Minister of Bangladesh and chairman of Bangladesh Nationalist Party. It is located at Gulshan Avenue, Dhaka. It has been served as the principal residence of prime minister since 2026.

== History ==
After the death of former President Ziaur Rahman in 1981, the then government allotted this house to his wife Khaleda Zia. This house is built on one and a half bighas of land.

Former Prime minister Khaleda Zia's rented personal residence Feroza Bhaban was right beside this house.

In 2025, ownership documentation of this residence was formally handed over by the government. In 2026, after Tarique becomes the prime minister of Bangladesh, he stays with his family in this building.

In June 2026, the government declared this Gulshan residence as a Key Point Installation (KPI).

== See also ==
- Bangabhaban
- Ganabhaban
- Feroza Bhaban
- House No. 6, Shaheed Moinul Road
- State Guest House Jamuna
- Hawa Bhaban
- Sudha Sadan
