= List of lieutenant governors of Eastern Bengal and Assam =

This is a list of holders of the office of Lieutenant-Governor of Eastern Bengal and Assam. The office of the Lieutenant-Governor of Eastern Bengal and Assam happened in 1905 due to the creation of the province from the eastern portion of Bengal Presidency and the Assam Province. The Province of Eastern Bengal and Assam existed alongside the Bengal Presidency until it was merged back into the Bengal Presidency and the Assam Province in 1912.

== List of lieutenant-governors ==
No.	Name	Portrait	Took office	Left office	Appointer
1	Sir Bampfylde Fuller		16 October 1905	20 August 1906	The Lord Curzon of Kedleston
2	Lancelot Hare		20 August 1906	1911	The Earl of Minto
3	Sir Charles Stuart Bayley		1911	21 March 1912	The Lord Hardinge of Penshurst

== See also ==
- List of governors of Bengal Presidency
