= President's Office (Bangladesh) =

Administrative office of the President of Bangladesh

- রাষ্ট্রপতির কার্যালয়
- Seal of the President of Bangladesh

Agency overview
- Formed: 26 March 1971
- Jurisdiction: Government of Bangladesh
- Headquarters: Bangabhaban
- President responsible: Mirza Fakhrul Islam Alamgir
- Agency executives: Khan Md Nurul Amin, Secretary, Public Division; Amanullah Saleh Muhammad Bahauddin, Military Secretary, Personal Division
- Child agencies: Public Division; Personal Division
- Website: https://bangabhaban.gov.bd/

The President's Office (Bengali: রাষ্ট্রপতির কার্যালয়, romanized: Rashtrapatir Karjaloy) is the administrative secretariat of the President of Bangladesh. It is housed inside Bangabhaban, the president's official residence in Dhaka, and provides the secretarial and administrative support that enables the president to carry out the constitutional, ceremonial and other duties of the office.

== History ==
The office's premises trace back to Government House, built to serve as the office and residence of the Lieutenant Governor following the creation of the province of Eastern Bengal and Assam in 1905. The building continued as the seat of the provincial governor through the British and Pakistani periods before becoming the office and residence of the President of Bangladesh after independence in 1971, when it was renamed Bangabhaban.

== Organization ==
The President's Office is made up of two divisions, the Public Division (Bengali: জন বিভাগ) and the Personal Division (Bengali: আপন বিভাগ), headed respectively by the Secretary to the President and the Military Secretary to the President.

=== Public Division ===
The Public Division provides secretarial support for the president's constitutional, legal and executive functions, drafts presidential speeches and messages, and handles the administrative, financial and public-relations affairs of the office.

Functions of the Public Division are:

- Administering and disbursing the President's discretionary funds.
- Assisting in the preparation of the President's speeches and official messages.
- Managing the division's administration, including financial affairs.
- Handling public relations and media communications.
- Overseeing staff welfare within the division.
- Conducting inquiries and compiling statistics on matters assigned to the division.
- Carrying out any additional responsibilities assigned by the President.
- Managing fees related to subjects under the division's jurisdiction, except court fees.
- Administering laws relating to subjects assigned to the division.

=== Personal Division ===
The Personal Division looks after the president's family and household affairs, the upkeep of the president's office and residence, and arrangements relating to the president's health and personal welfare.

Functions of the Personal Division are:

- Managing matters relating to the President's family.
- Organizing and coordinating state ceremonies, including the presentation of credentials by foreign diplomats, state banquets, oath-taking ceremonies, National Day receptions, gallantry award ceremonies, and the presentation of state honours.
- Arranging the reception and hospitality of visiting foreign Heads of State, Heads of Government, and other dignitaries.
- Maintaining records and schedules of the President's official programmes and activities.
- Maintaining and decorating the President's office and official residence.
- Administering the President's salary and allowances in accordance with the law.
- Directing and supervising the activities of the President Guard Regiment (PGR).
- Coordinating the President's official tours within Bangladesh and abroad.
- Administering retirement allowances and other benefits for former Presidents.
- Managing official vehicles assigned to the President.
- Procuring, maintaining, and managing the division's vehicle fleet.
- Promoting the welfare of the division's employees.
- Managing the administration and financial affairs of the division.
- Administering laws, rules, and regulations assigned to the division.
- Collecting and administering fees related to matters under the division's jurisdiction, except court fees.
- Performing any other functions assigned by the President.

== See also ==
- Bangabhaban
- President of Bangladesh
- Prime Minister's Office (Bangladesh)
