= Bengal Legislative Council (disambiguation) =

Bengal Legislative Council may refer to:

- British Bengal Legislative Council
- West Bengal Legislative Council
- Eastern Bengal and Assam Legislative Council
