= Lancelot Hare =

Lieutenant Governor of the Province of Eastern Bengal and Assam

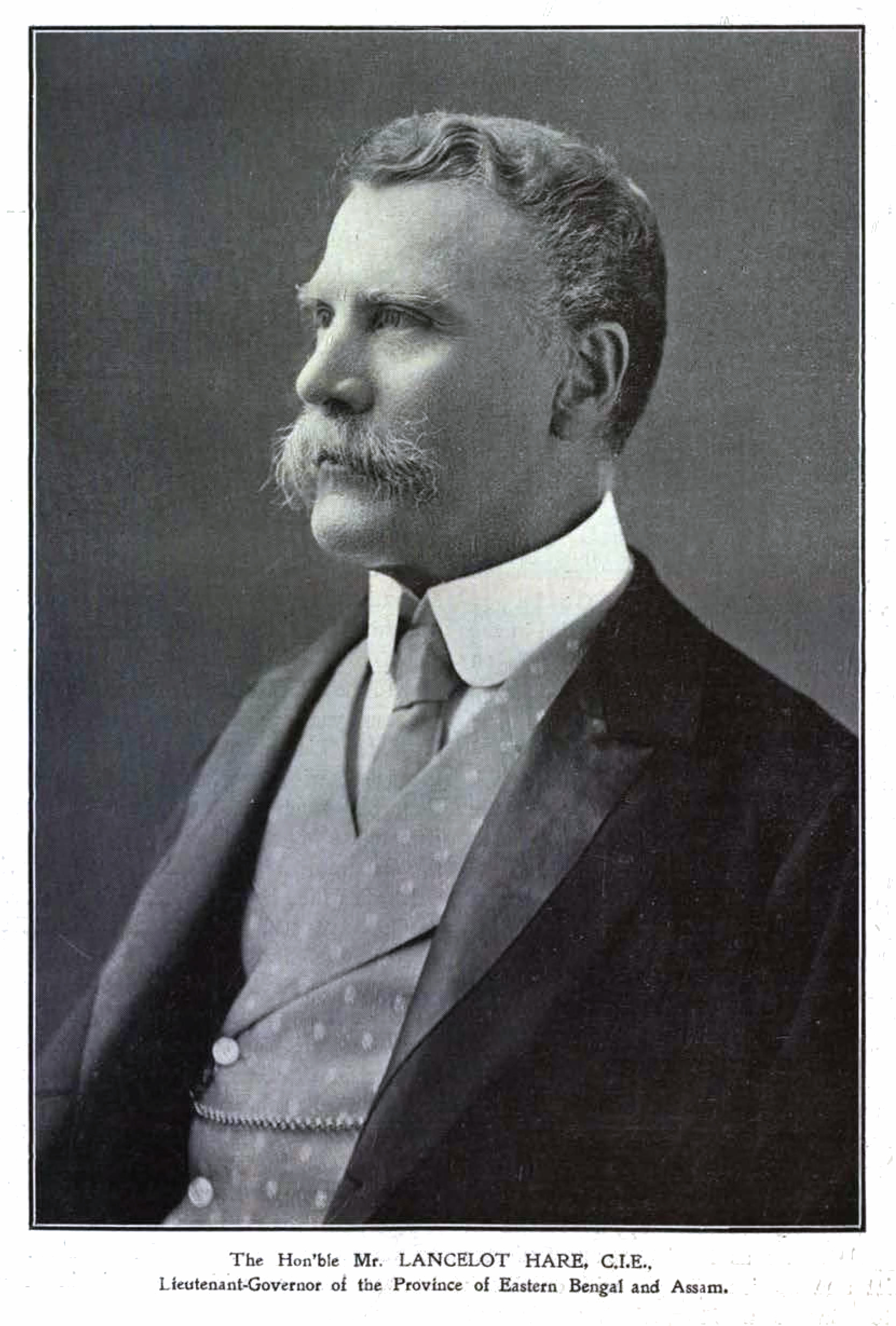
c. 1907

Sir Lancelot Hare KCSI CIE (7 December 1851 – 7 October 1922) was a British civil servant and former Lieutenant Governor of the Bengal province of the British Raj.

== Early life ==
Hare was born in London, Britain. He was educated at the City of London School.

== Career ==
Hare joined the Indian Civil Service in 1873 at Bengal. In 1900 he was awarded CIE. He worked at a number of districts of Bengal and was promoted to the Governor General's council. On 20 August 1906, Bampfylde Fuller resigned following the uproar over the Partition of Bengal and Hare was appointed the governor of East Bengal and Assam. In 1906 he was awarded CSI and in 1907 KCSI.

== Death and legacy ==
Hare died on 7 October 1922. A street in Dhaka is named after him.
