= Eastern Bengal and Assam Legislative Council =

Legislative council of Eastern Bengal and Assam

Eastern Bengal and Assam Legislative Council পূর্ববঙ্গ ও আসাম আইন পরিষদ

Type
- Type: Unicameral

History
- Founded: 18 December 1906
- Disbanded: 18 March 1912
- Preceded by: Bengal Legislative Council
- Succeeded by: Assam Legislative Council; Bengal Legislative Council
- Seats: 41

Meeting place
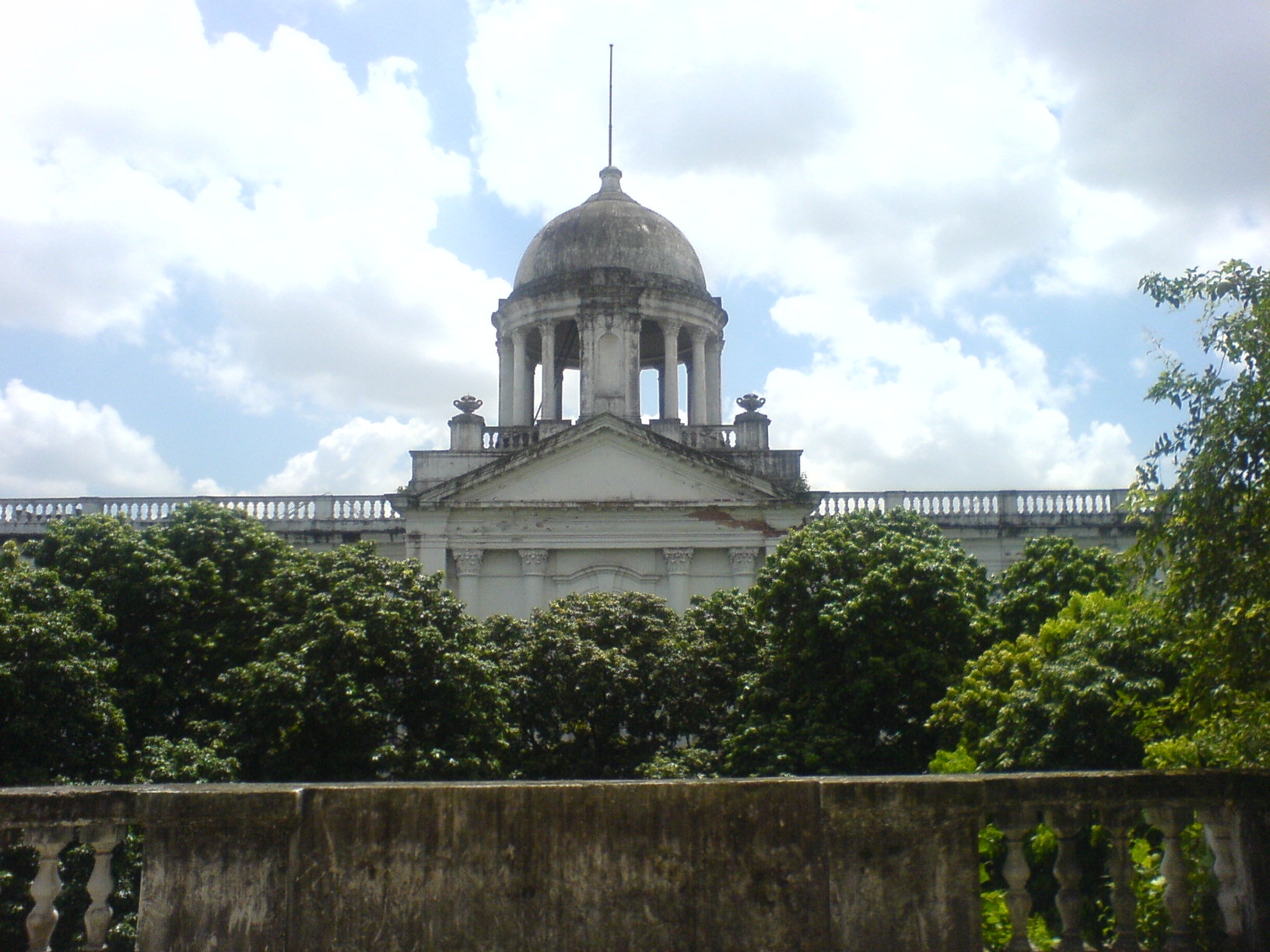
- Government House in Dacca, Eastern Bengal and Assam (now known as Old High Court Building, Dhaka)

The Eastern Bengal and Assam Legislative Council (Bengali: পূর্ববঙ্গ ও আসাম আইন পরিষদ) was the legislative council of Eastern Bengal and Assam, a province of the British India covering Bangladesh and Northeast India. It would meet in the Government House of Dacca, the provincial capital. Its ex-officio head was the Lieutenant Governor of Eastern Bengal and Assam.

== Constitution ==
The first Legislative Council was formed under the Indian Councils Act 1892. The Lt. Governor recommended members from the recommendations of District Boards, municipalities, landlords and chambers of commerce. The Lt. Governor required the assent of the Viceroy of India to appoint the nominees. The council was entitled to discuss budgets and make suggestions to the government, but lacked voting powers. Most members of the council were Europeans, with a minority being native Indian subjects.

== Morley–Minto Reforms ==
The Indian Councils Act 1909, crafted by John Morley and Lord Minto, ushered partially elected legislative councils. The reforms increased the representation of native subjects. Land owners received the right to vote. Muslims were granted the right to a separate electorate, as part of affirmative action. The Legislative Council assembled for the purpose of making Laws and Regulations under the Provisions of the Indian Council Acts, 1861, 1892 and 1909. It advised the Executive Council of the Lt. Governor.

== Membership ==
The council included 41 members after the Morley-Minto Reforms. Its composition is illustrated in the following.

- Ex-officio Member
  - Lieutenant Governor
- Nominated Members
  - A maximum of 17 from Officials
  - 1 from Indian commerce
  - 2 from Experts
  - A minimum of 2 from Others
- Elected members
  - Chittagong Port Commission
  - Municipalities
  - District and local boards
  - Landholders
  - Muhammadans
  - Tea interest
  - Jute interest

== Geographic coverage ==
East Bengal had the most seats on the council due to its large population. Colonial Assam, which covers the Indian states of Assam, Meghalaya, Nagaland, Mizoram and Arunachal Pradesh; had 5 seats on the 41-member council due to its smaller population.

== See also ==
- Legislatures of British India
