= Dhanmondi Lake =

Lake in Bangladesh

Dhanmondi lake
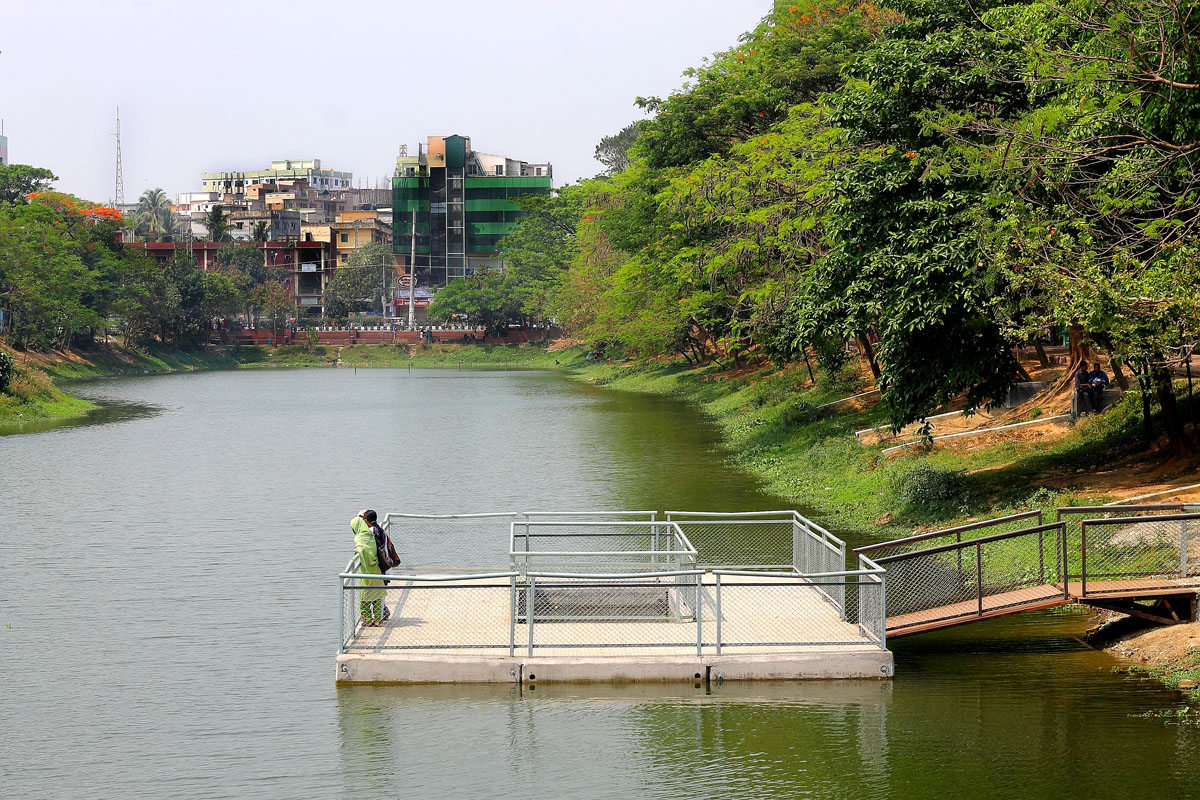
- Lake in 2013

- Location within Bangladesh
- Location: Dhaka
- Coordinates: 23.7455°N 90.3776°E
- Basin countries: Bangladesh

Dhanmondi Lake, located in the middle of Dhaka, Bangladesh, is a prominent urban water body known for its picturesque setting and recreational opportunities. Part of the Dhanmondi residential area established in the late 1950s, the lake underwent significant development in 1996, transforming into its current state surrounded by greenery and walkways. The lake's perimeter is adorned with various amenities, including parks, cafes, and an amphitheatre.

== History ==
=== Background ===
In Dhaka city maps dating back to 1859 and 1924, a water body near Dhanmondi was evident, flowing into the Buriganga River. According to Banglapedia, it was originally an abandoned channel of the 'Karwan Bazar Nadi', formerly known as the 'Carevan River'. Its alignment likely followed Begunbari Khal-Green Road-Kalabagan-Dhanmondi Lake to the Turag River. Part of this lake still serves as a stormwater drain, ultimately emptying into the Begunbari Khal. Over time, much of this water body was filled in as the city expanded. Consequentially it gained its status as a lake in Dhanmondi in the 1960s, around the time Dhanmondi was developed as a residential area, 16 percent of whose land was allocated for the lake.

=== Development ===
In 1996, the Dhaka City Corporation (DCC), led by architect Iqbal Habib, oversaw the renovation of the lake, which was opened to the public in 2000. From 2011 to 2013, significant improvement projects were undertaken for the lake. These initiatives focused on cleaning and re-excavating the lake, as well as constructing small overbridges, drains, public toilets, and street lights. Additionally, efforts were made to enhance the surrounding environment by planting trees, installing iron fencing, and building walkways.

In March 2021, the Dhaka South City Corporation (DSCC), successor to the DCC, leased the lake and its surrounding area for a year to seven individuals, dividing the space into seven sectors. Subsequently, the DSCC initiated a renovation and development project for the lake and its vicinity, with a budget of ৳14.6247 crore (US$1.2 million). The project commenced in May 2021 and is expected to conclude by December. It encompasses several aspects, such as constructing a new food court on the fifth island near Bajra and Sudha Sadan, as well as renovating the Sampan, Dingi, and Panshee restaurants and food courts. Additionally, the project entails the construction of a new 450-metre walkway and the renovation of existing walkways, along with the development of the lake's shoreline.

== Geography ==
The lake is located in the middle of Dhaka city, within the vicinity of Dhanmondi residential area. Situated adjacent to Sat Masjid Road and Mirpur Road, the lake, stretching from Jigatola (Dhanmondi Road #2) to Road #27 (new 16A), is bordered by the Mohammadpur-Lalmatia area to the north, Sat Masjid Road to the west, BDR Gate (Dhanmondi Road #2) to the south, and Kalabagan residential area to the east. It spans a length of three kilometres and varies in width from 35 to 100 m, with a maximum depth of 4.77 m. The total area of the water body is 37.37 hectares, about 16 percent of the land of Dhanmondi residential area. According to the Encyclopedia of Dhaka, the development covers an area of 85.6 acres, comprising 31 acres of land and 54.60 acres of water, with varying widths ranging from 10 to 18 feet. There is a single box culvert near the Sukrabad area, serving as the lake's sole outlet. This culvert allows excess floodwater from heavy rainfall to pass through, helping to maintain a relatively stable water level in the lake throughout the seasons.

== Facilities ==
The lake has become a popular leisure and entertainment destination for the city's residents, attracting crowds on weekends and holidays. The lake offers panoramic views to many thousands of people who live in the vicinity. A park and a several-kilometre-long walkway surrounds the lake, and tree-planting initiatives have been implemented. Facilities for hosting theatre and other cultural events are available at the Rabindra Sarobar amphitheatre, along with restaurants, coffee shops, public toilets, children's play areas, a health club, and a boat club, among others.

== Operation and management ==
The management of the lake is decentralised, with five distinct government entities responsible for overseeing different aspects of its facilities. The Ministry of Works holds formal ownership of the lake, while the Fisheries Department focuses on fishery development. Development works and maintenance are handled by the Ministry of Local Government, Rural Development and Co-operatives in coordination with the Dhaka South City Corporation. The Department of Environment (DOE) is tasked with safeguarding the environmental integrity of the lake and protecting its aquatic resources.

According to the lake's original architect Iqbal Habib, the monthly management and maintenance expenses for Dhanmondi Lake amount to approximately ৳12 lakh. Annually, this cost amounts to approximately ৳1.44 crore. For any supplementary repair and renovation work, an additional ৳1 crore is typically allocated to the upkeep of Dhanmondi Lake. Consequently, the operational budget stands at ৳2.5 crore, with revenue reaching ৳3 crore.

== Gallery ==
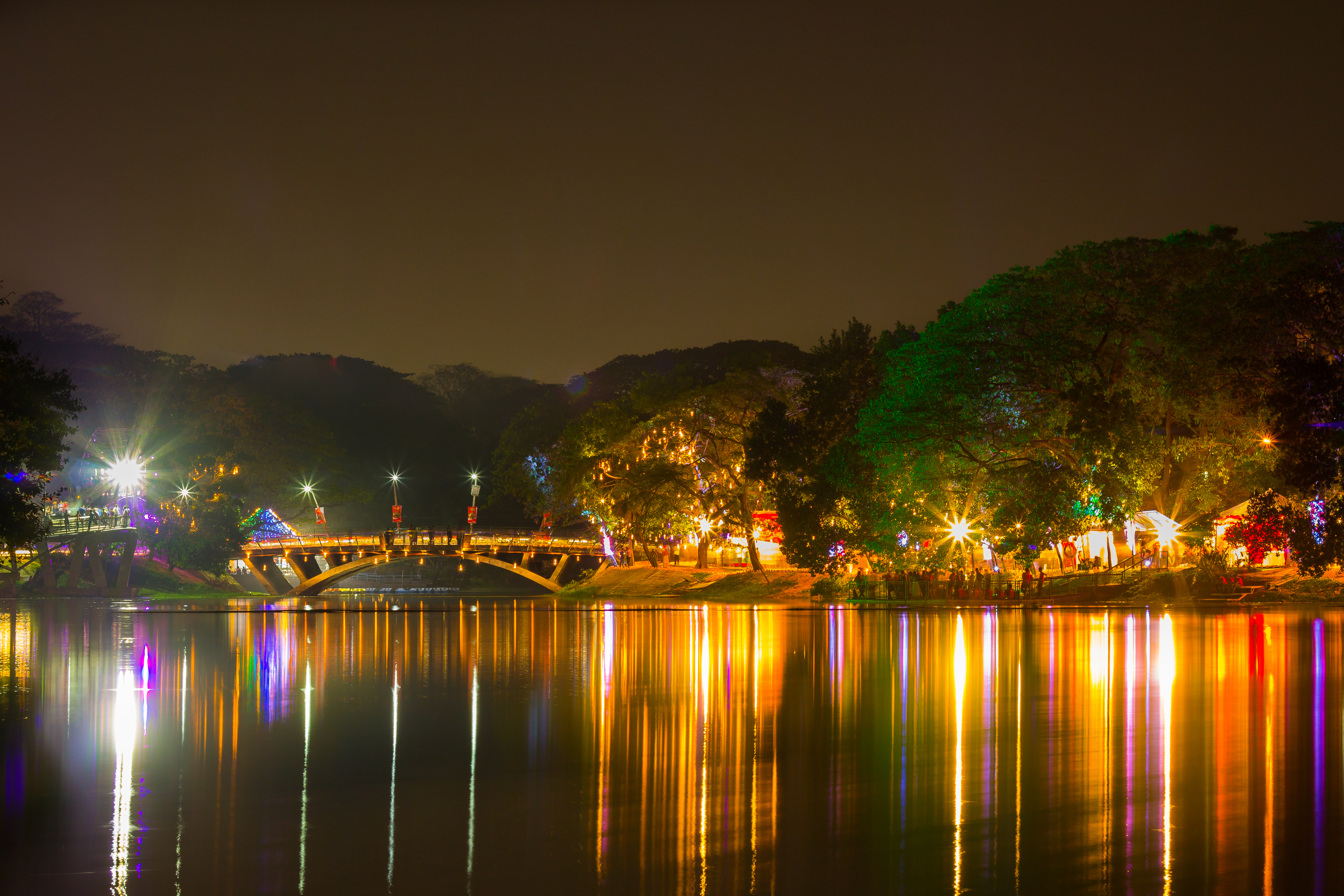
Night view

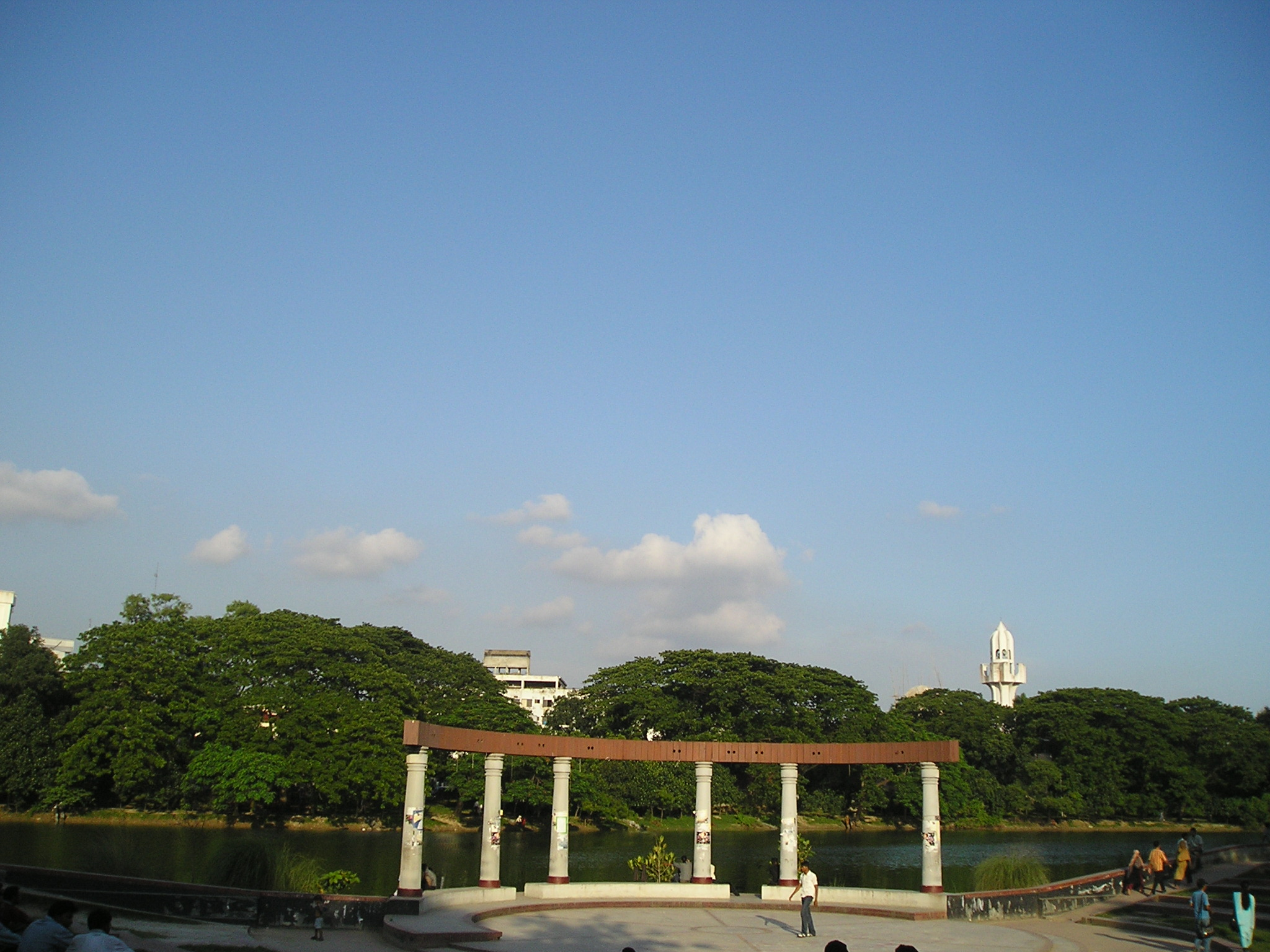
Rabindra-Sarobar

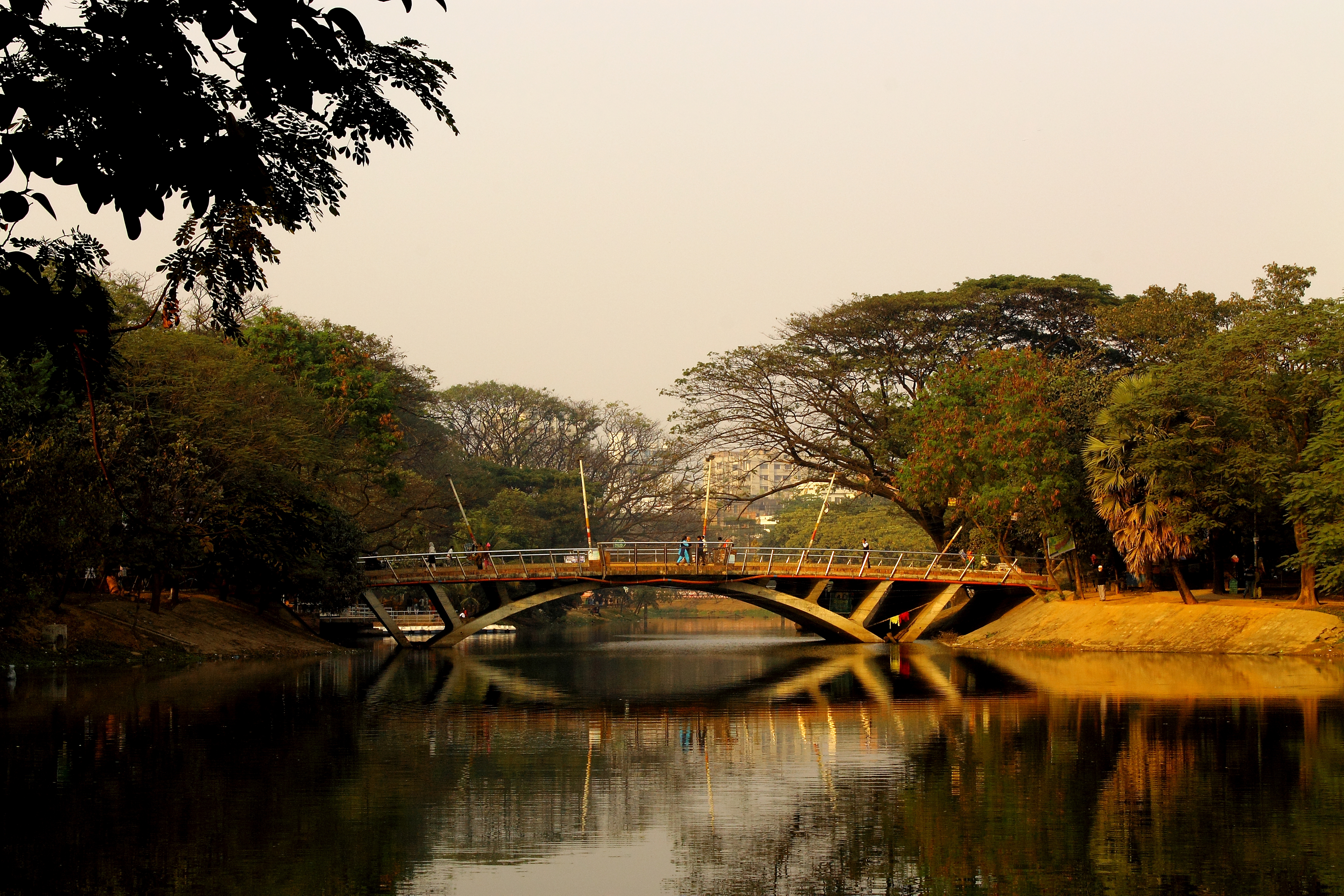
No. 8 Bridge

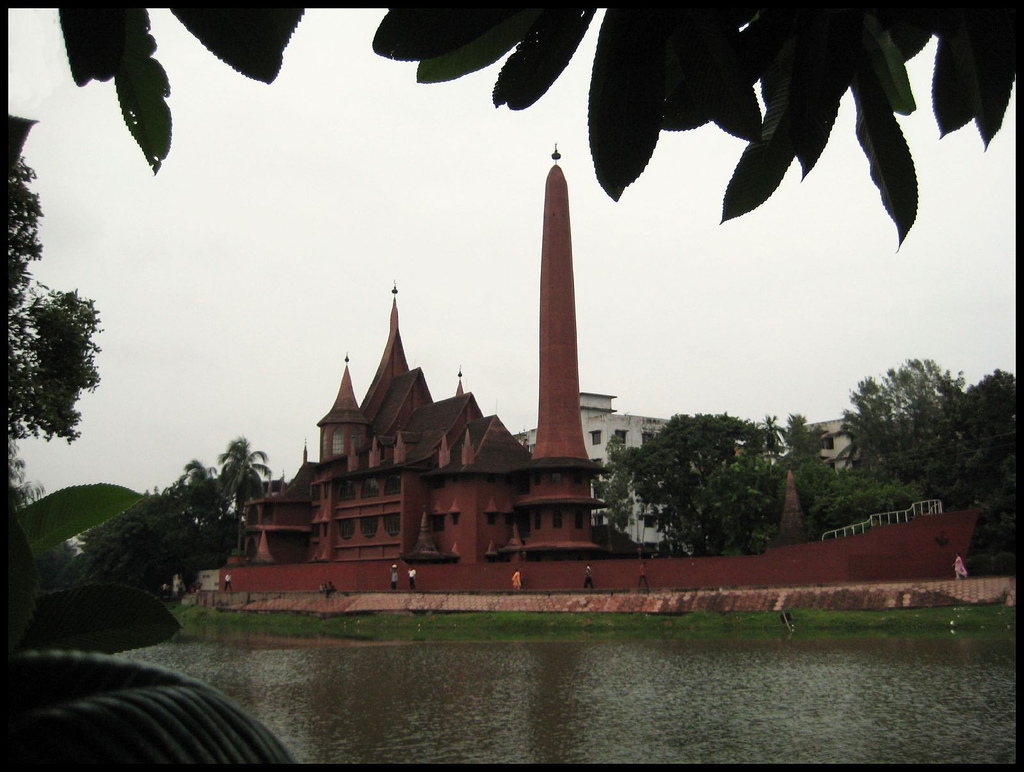
Chistia Palace, built in the 1990s by a local businessman

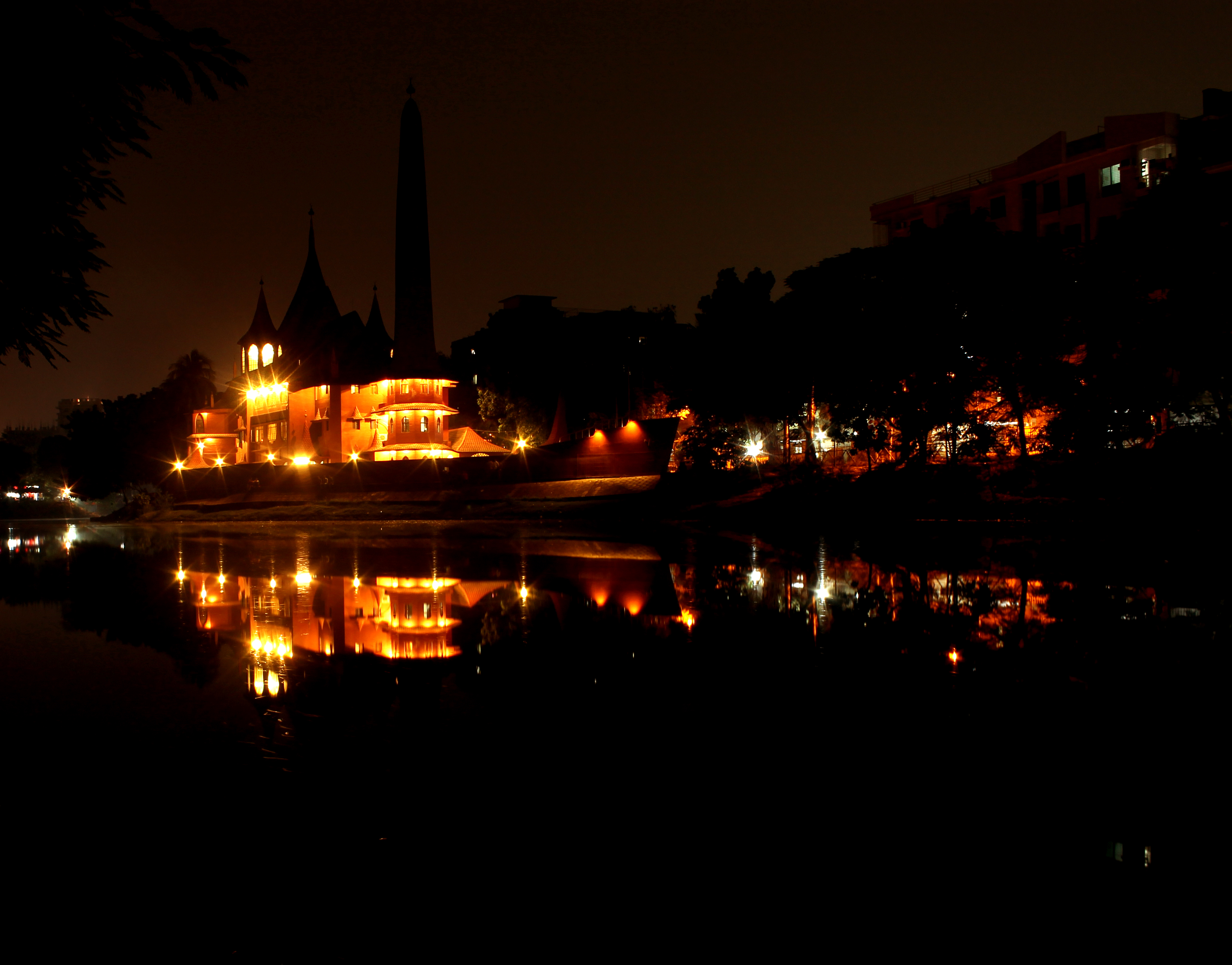
Night view of Chistia Palace

== See also ==
- Gulshan Lake
- Hatirjheel
