= Gulshan Central Mosque =

Mosque in Dhaka, Bangladesh

- Gulshan Azad Mosque
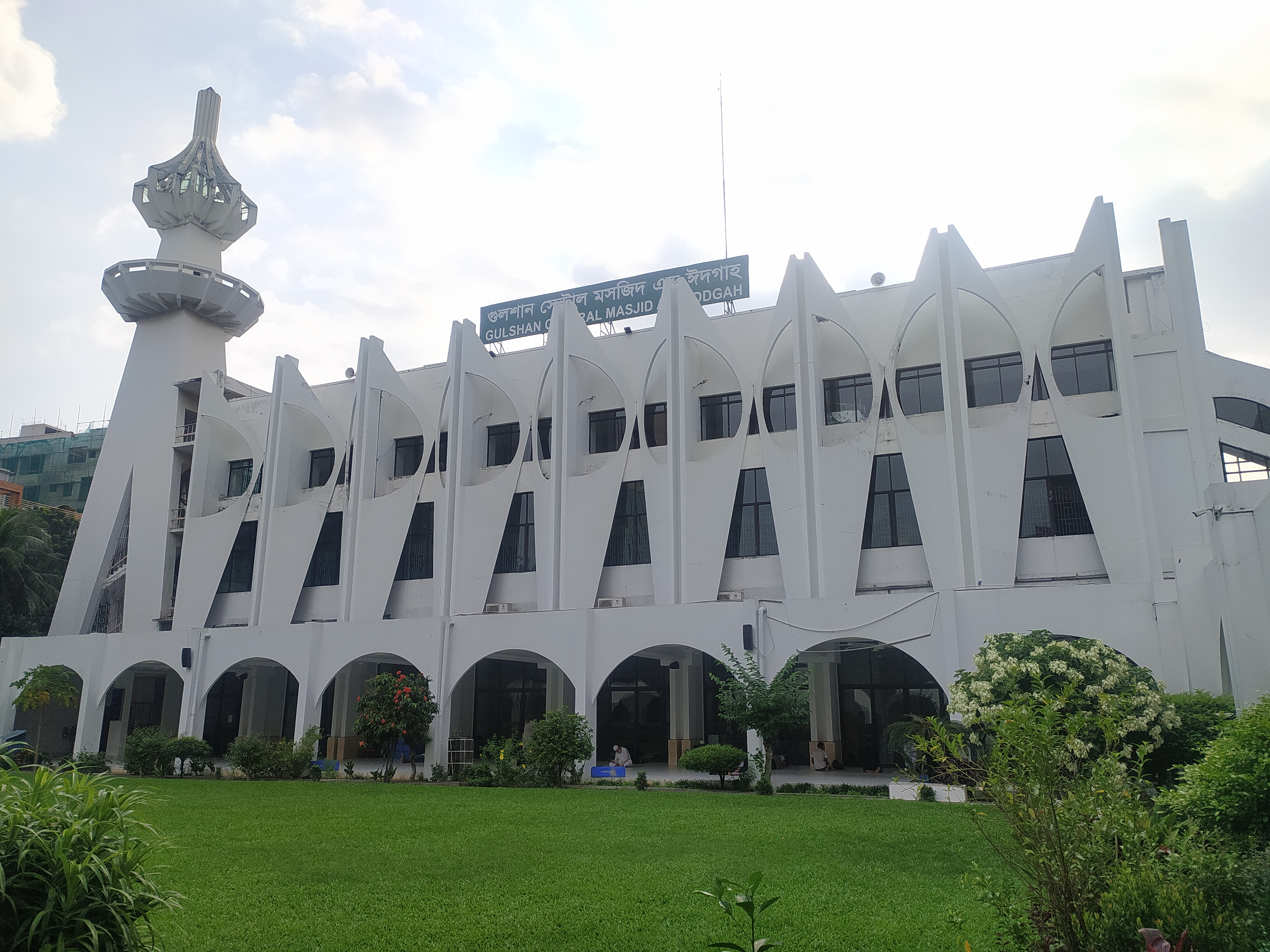

Religion
- Affiliation: Islam
- Ecclesiastical or organizational status: Active

Location
- Location: 111, Gulshan Avenue, Dhaka, Bangladesh
- Interactive map of Gulshan Central Mosque
- Coordinates: 23.790024°N 90.414823°E

Architecture
- Type: Mosque
- Established: 1976

Website
- gcmisbd.org

The Gulshan Central Mosque and Iddgah Society (Bengali: গুলশান কেন্দ্রীয় মসজিদ এন্ড ইদ্গাহ সোসাইটি), also called Gulshan Azad Mosque is a Mosque in Gulshan, Dhaka, Bangladesh.

== History ==
The mosque was established on 18 April, 1976 occupying 6 acres of land. It was designed by architect Mesbah-ul-Kabir. The mosque has the capacity to accommodate over 10,000 devotees at a time. Maulana Shamsul Haque was the khatib of the mosque until 2019. Mahmudul Hasan is the current khatib of this mosque.

In addition to men, the mosque has separate prayer facilities for women.

== See also ==
- Islam in Bangladesh
- List of mosques in Bangladesh
