= Gulshan Avenue =

Road in Dhaka, Bangladesh

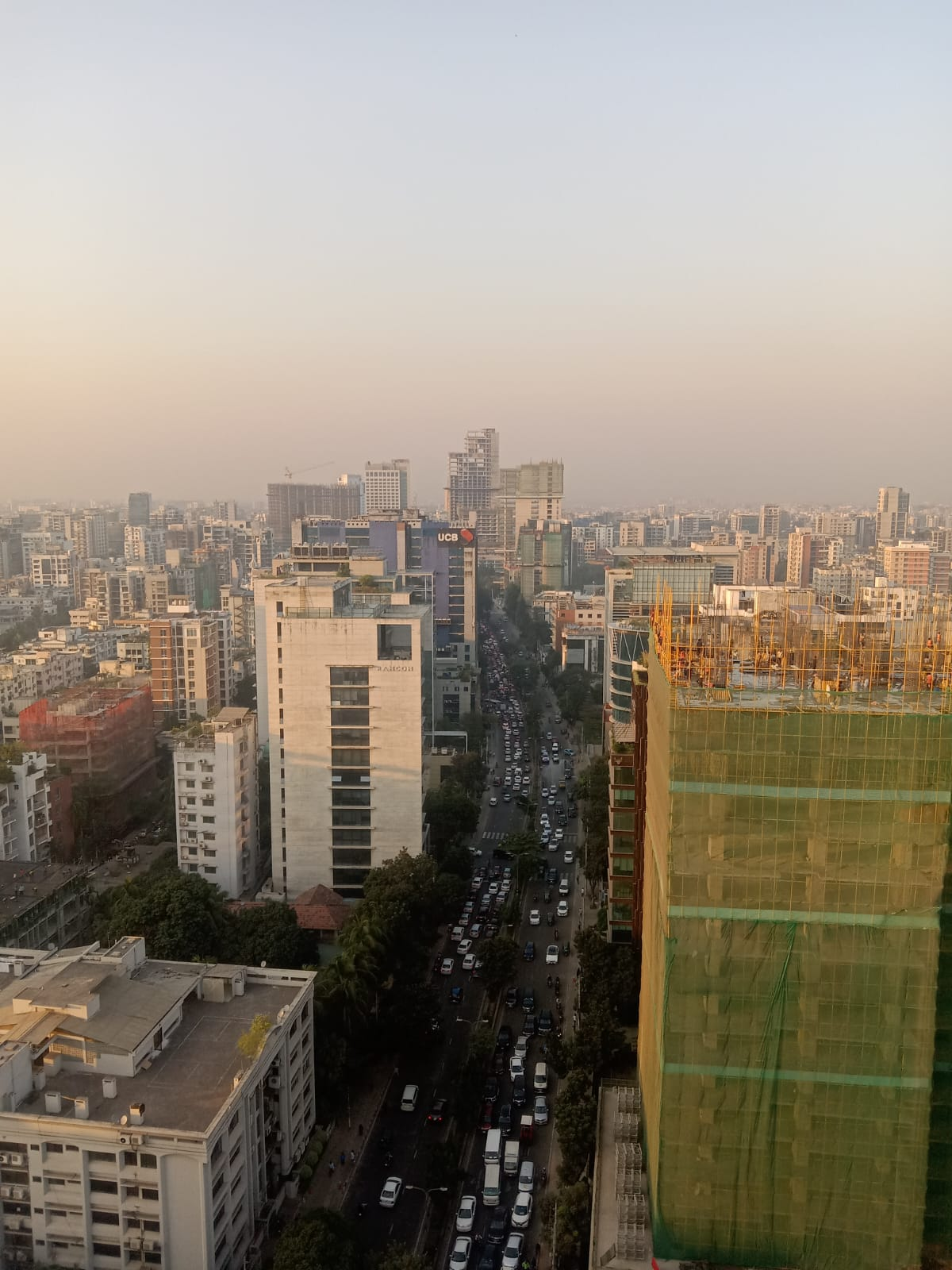
- Gulshan Avenue skyline
- Part of: Gulshan Thana
- Type: Avenue
- Maintained by: Dhaka North City Corporation
- Length: 5 km (3.1 mi)
- Location: Dhaka
- Postal code: 1212
- South end: Banani-Baridhara
- North end: Tejgaon-Mohakhali

Gulshan Avenue is a major avenue in Gulshan, Dhaka, which connects Banani-Baridhara to Tejgaon-Mohakhali. It is home to a number of the city's restaurants, five-star hotels, shopping centres, schools, banks, offices, and clubs.

== History ==
In 2025, A road stretching from Gulshan-2 to Pragati Sarani has officially been renamed "Felani Avenue" in memory of Felani Khatun, the teenage girl killed by India's Border Security Force (BSF) in 2011.

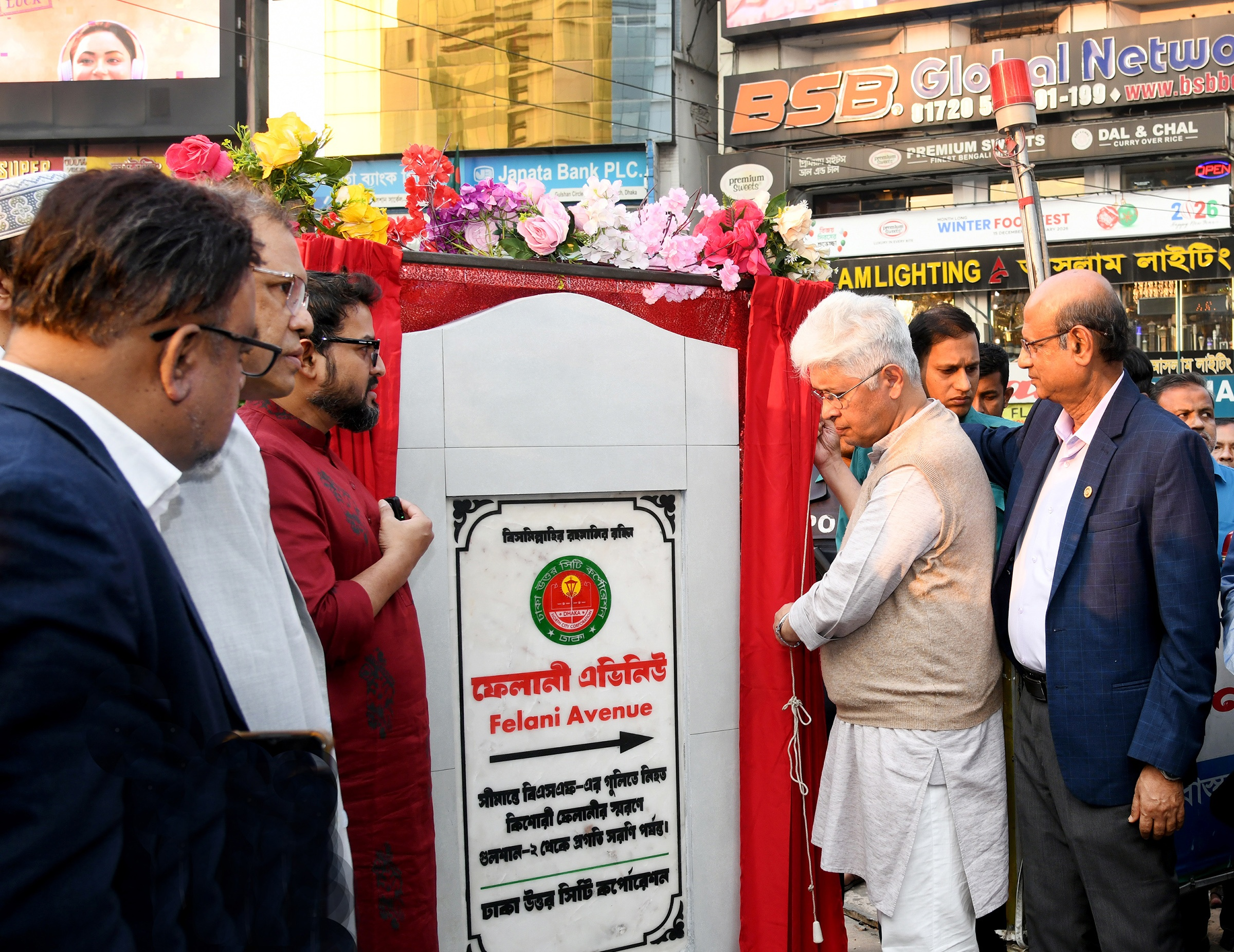
Adilur Rahman Khan unveiling Felani Avenue nameplate in the Gulshan Avenue

Prime Minister Tarique Rahman's personal residence is also on this avenue.

== Notable places ==
- Navana Tower
- 196, Gulshan Avenue
- Banglalink, Headquarters
- Gulshan Central Mosque
- Bangladesh Shooting Sport Federation, Headquarters
- Shahid Dr. Fazle Rabbi Park
- United Commercial Bank, Headquarters
- The Westin Dhaka
- Hilton Dhaka
- Doreen Tower
