= Bangabhaban =

Official residence of the President of Bangladesh

- বঙ্গভবন
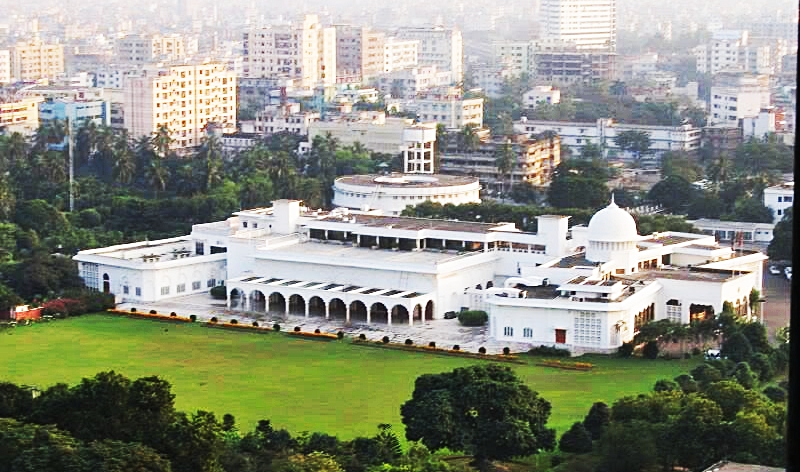

- Location within Dhaka
- Former names: Governor's House

General information
- Architectural style: Indo-Islamic
- Location: Bangabhabhan Road, Dhaka, Bangladesh, Dhaka, Bangladesh
- Coordinates: 23°43′24″N 90°25′04″E
- Current tenants: Mirza Fakhrul Islam Alamgir (President); Rahat Ara Begum (First Lady)
- Opened: 1905

Technical details
- Size: 50 acre
- Floor area: 202,300 m^{2} (2,178,000 sq ft)

Website
- bangabhaban.gov.bd

Crest of the President

The Bangabhaban (Bengali: বঙ্গভবন, romanised: Bôngobhôbôn, lit. 'House of Bengal') is the official residence and principal workplace of the President of Bangladesh, located on Bangabhaban Road, and short road connecting Dilkusha Avenue, Dhaka. It is surrounded by the Bangabhaban Gardens, which was formerly the Nawab's Dilkusha Gardens.

The palace was originally built as a government house of the British Empire. Following the independence of Pakistan, it became the official residence of the governor of East Bengal and, after 1955, the governor of East Pakistan. President Abu Sayeed Chowdhury became the first Bangladeshi president to reside there after taking oath on 12 January 1972. The President Guard Regiment unit is responsible for the palace's security.

== History ==
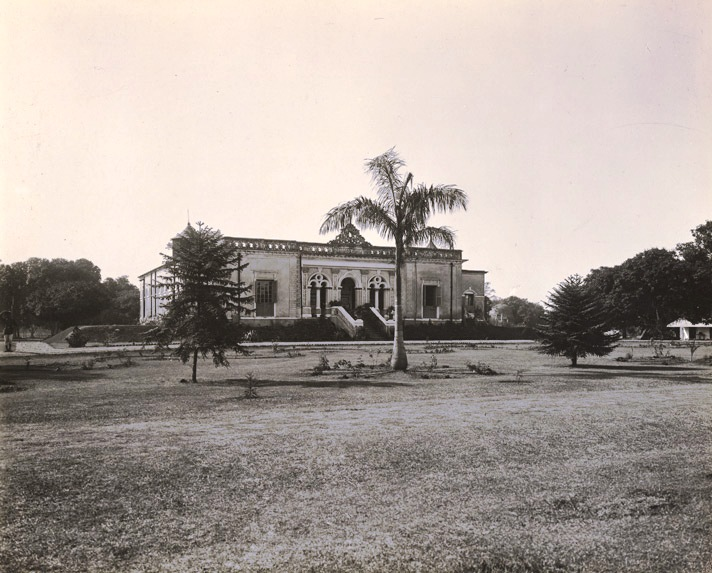
Manuk House in 1904, which is part of the Bangabhaban complex. Currently used as a treasury.

During the period of the Bengal Sultanate Sultan of Bengal, a Sufi saint, Hazrat Shahjalal Dakhini of Dhaka, and his followers were killed by agents of the sultan and buried on the site of Bangabhaban. The site soon became famous as a Mazhar (mausoleum) for the devotees of the saint. It is conjectured that it belonged to a zamindar during the early period of British rule. Later Nawab of Dhaka Sir Khwaja Abdul Ghani bought the site and built a bungalow there, which he named as Dilkusha Garden (Dilkusha, Dhaka).

With the partition of Bengal in 1905 by Lord Curzon, the government of the newly created province of Eastern Bengal and Assam acquired the site and constructed a palatial house for the lieutenant-governor and his officers. On 14 February 1906, Sir Joseph Bamfylde Fuller, the first lieutenant-governor of the province, started his official work at what is today the Darbar Hall of the Bangabhaban, and the palace soon came to be known as the Dilkusha Government House. Following the departure of the British and the independence of the Dominion of Pakistan in 1947, the new province of East Bengal officially became part of Pakistan and the palace came to be known as the Governor's House as it officially housed the governor of East Bengal. In 1955 the province of East Bengal was restructured and renamed East Pakistan as part of the One Unit Scheme. The building was damaged by a storm in 1961; substantial reconstruction was completed by 1964. After the independence of Bangladesh, on 23 December 1971, in the nation's first ever cabinet meeting held at the Governor's House presided over by Acting President Syed Nazrul Islam, a decision is made to rechristen the building to Bangabhaban, meaning "House of Bengal". After his release from custody in what was West Pakistan, the president, Sheikh Mujibur Rahman, in 1972, resigned from presidency at the Bangabhaban to be sworn in as prime minister, due to the decision to switch to a parliamentary system of government.

A book, Hundred Years of Bangabhaban, on the history of the Bangabhaban was published in 2006.

== Status ==
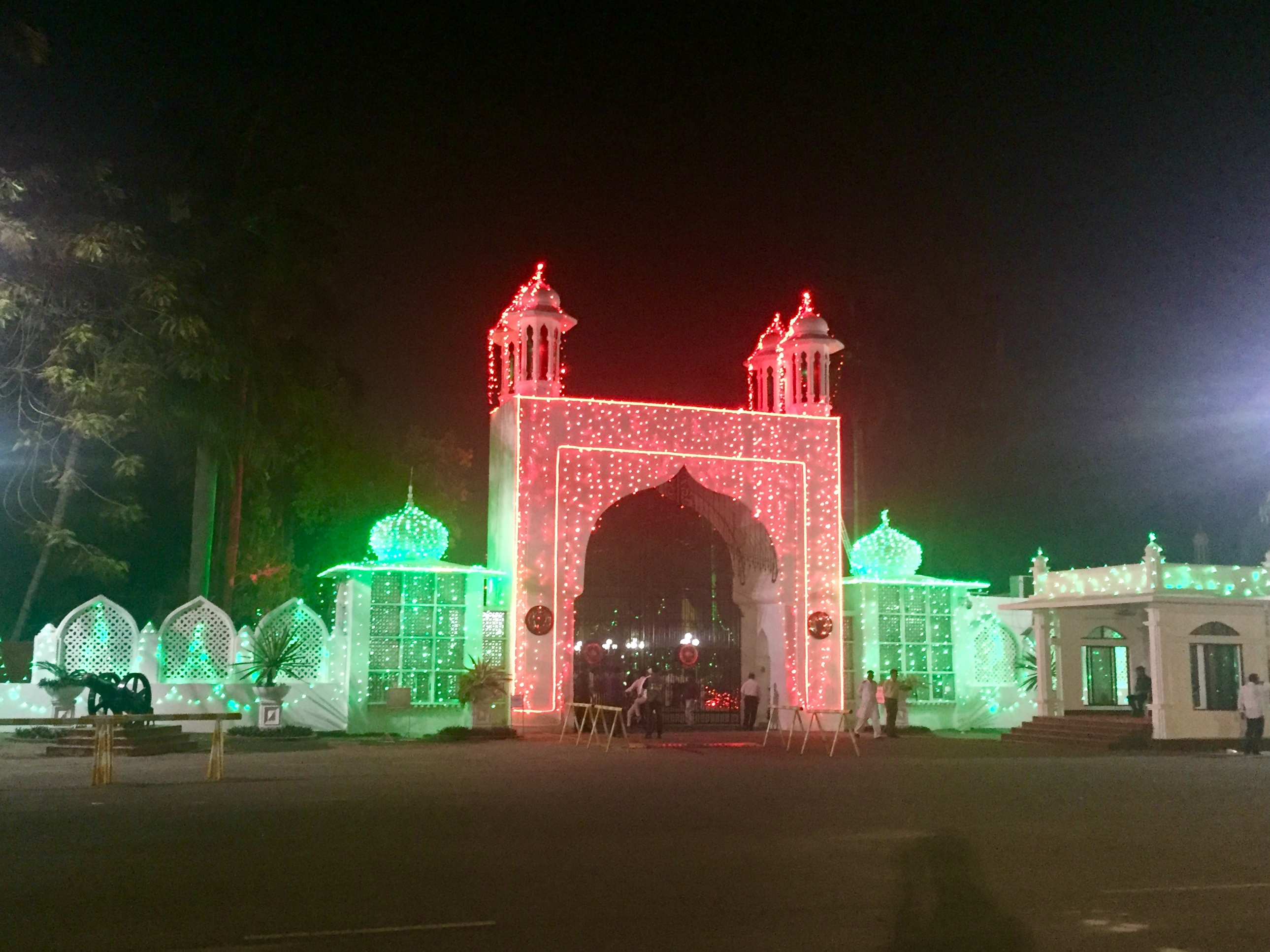
Main gate illuminated by decorative lighting during festive time

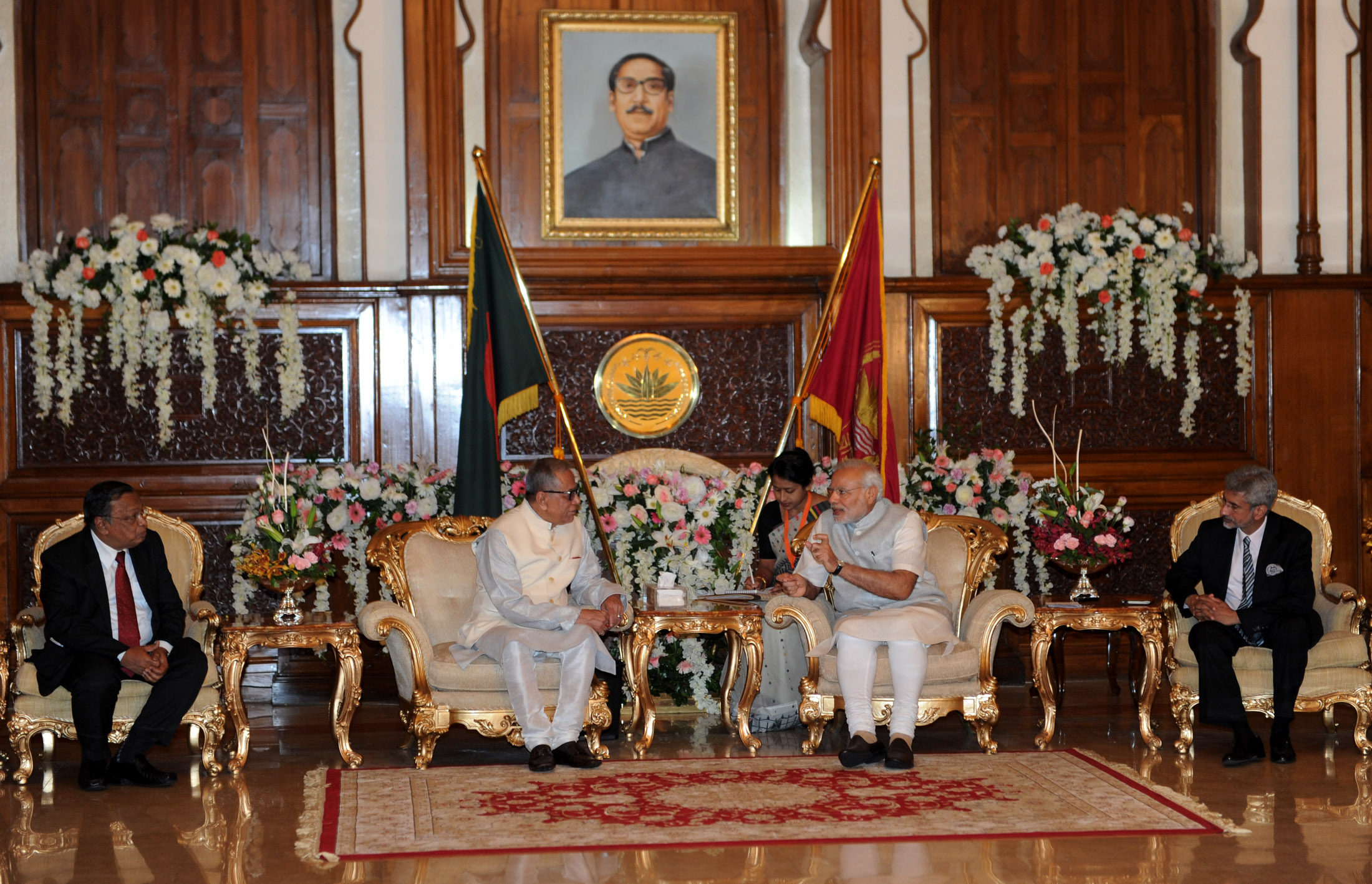
Former President Mohammad Abdul Hamid meeting with Indian Prime Minister Narendra Modi at Bangabhaban on 7 June 2015

One of the most important symbols of the Bangladeshi government, the Bangabhaban holds a status akin to the official residence and office of heads of states around the world. The palace is an important historical landmark and the centre of media and tourist attraction. Special public ceremonies are held during Independence Day of Bangladesh on 26 March every year. The Bangladesh president frequently holds meetings, conferences and state dinners for all occasions representing Bangladesh, including national leaders, intellectuals and visiting foreign heads of states and ambassadors. The traditions and pomp of the palace are a symbolic indication of the presidency's ceremonial superiority to other public and national institutions.

== Structure ==
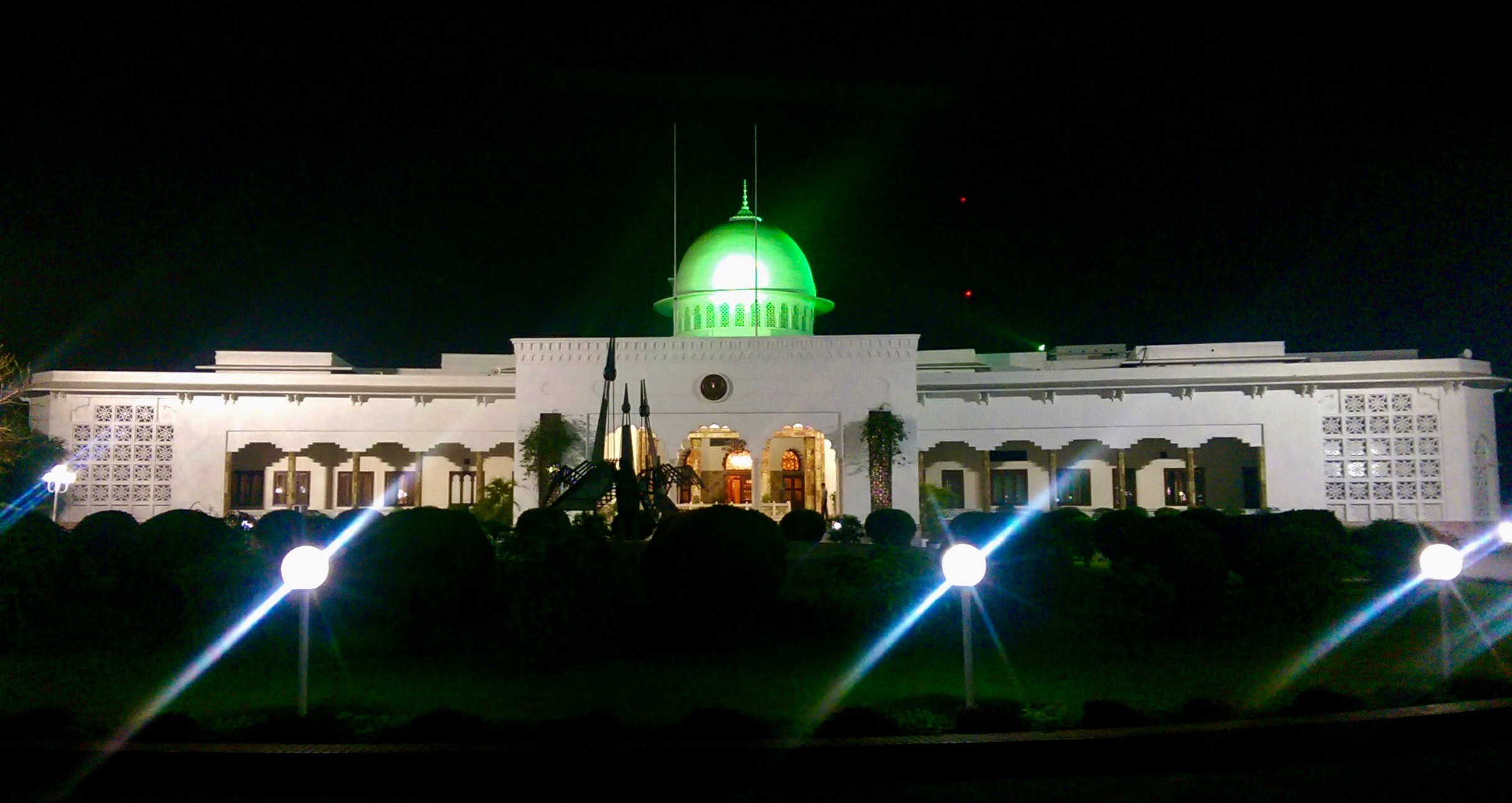
Main entrance facade

The Bangabhaban is built in an Indo-Saracenic style that typify numerous buildings during the British colonial era in Dhaka. With the reconstruction of the complex during the 1960s, it incorporated various elements from Islamic and Bengali architectures. The palace has high boundary walls on all four sides. The main building is a three-storeyed palatial complex, around which stands extensive greenery and tree cover. The floorspace of the ground floor is 7000 square metres. The president's residence is on the north-east corner, comprising two storeys of two suites along with five well-furnished spacious bedrooms.

The president's office, the office of the civil and military secretaries and other presidential officials, and separate rooms for audience with local and foreign visitors are also located in the ground floor. In addition, there is a cabinet room, banquet hall, darbar hall (court), state dining hall, a small auditorium and a lounge for local visitors. In addition to the president's residence, there are five rooms for officials, a control room and a studio in the first floor. In the second floor, there are four suites for foreign heads of state and government.

The Bangabhaban has an open compound of 50 acres (20 ha) of land. The security office, post office, bank, cafeteria hall, tailoring shop, a three-domed mosque and barracks of the president's guard regiment are located in the vicinity of the main gate of the Bangabhaban. The residential quarters for officers and staff of the President's office are located in three outlying areas of Bangabhaban. There are also two bungalows: one for the military secretary and the other for the assistant military secretary.

== See also ==
- Politics of Bangladesh
- President of Bangladesh
- Prime Minister of Bangladesh
- List of presidents of Bangladesh
