= The Westin Dhaka =

Tallest hotel in Bangladesh

Coordinates: 23.7933°N 90.4146°E

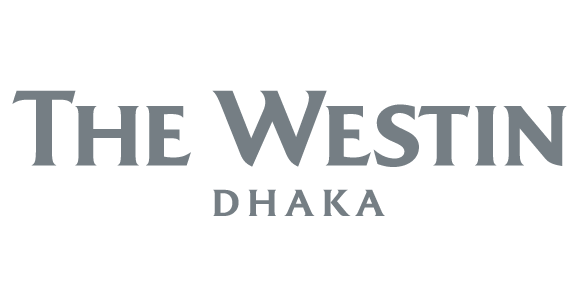

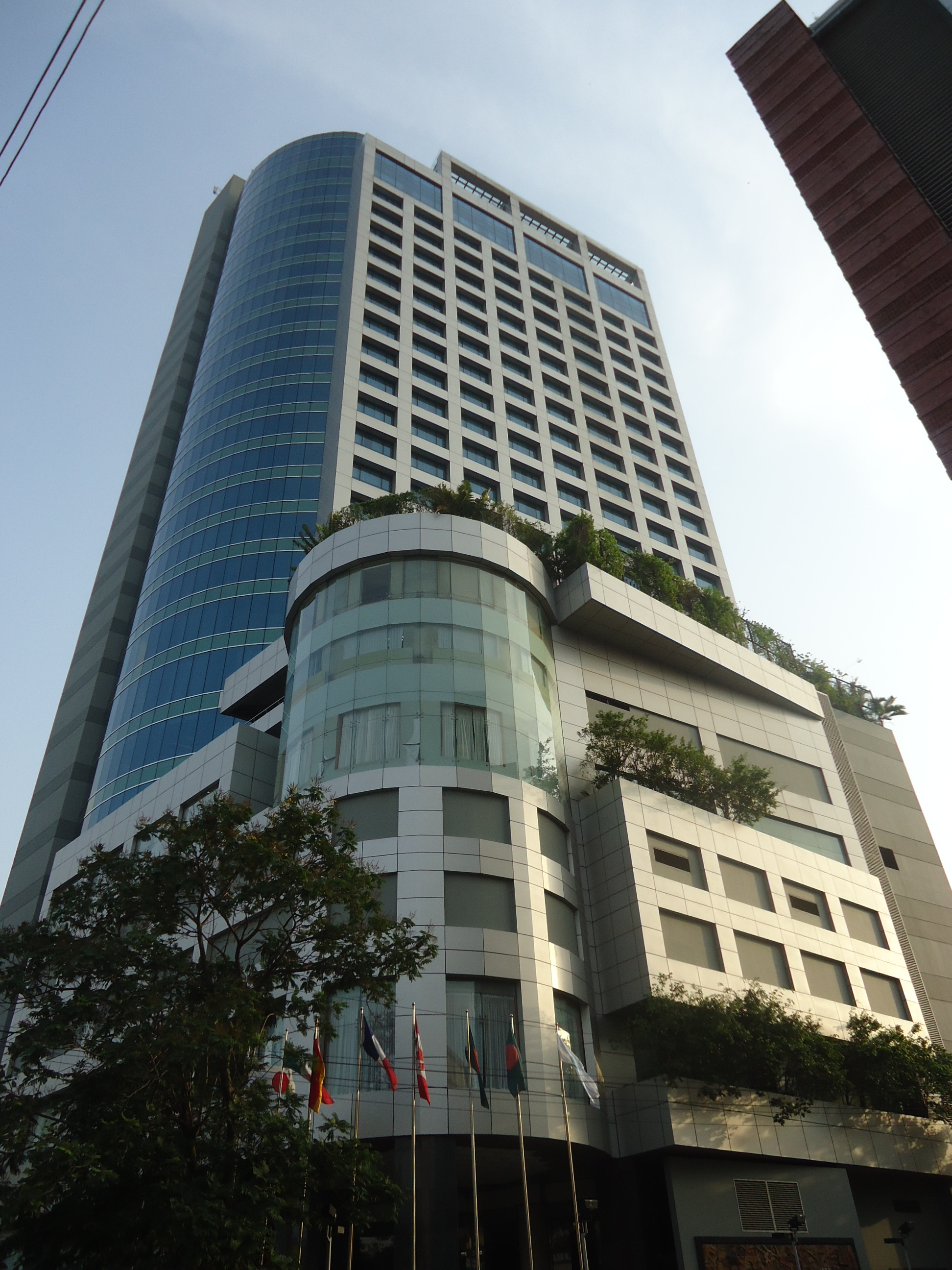
- Interactive map of the The Westin Dhaka area
- Hotel chain: Westin Hotels & Resorts

General information
- Status: Completed
- Type: Hotel
- Location: Main Gulshan Avenue, Plot#01, Road#45, cwn(b), Gulshan-2, Gulshan, Dhaka-1212, Bangladesh
- Construction started: 1998
- Opening: 2007; 19 years ago
- Owner: Unique Hotel and Resorts PLC
- Operator: Marriott International, Inc.

Height
- Height: 86 m (282 ft)

Technical details
- Floor count: 24

Design and construction
- Architects: Mohammad Foyez Ullah, Mustapha Khalid Palash

Other information
- Number of rooms: 235
- Number of restaurants: 5
- Parking: Yes

Website
- westin.marriott.com

The Westin Dhaka is a 5-star hotel under the international hotel chain Westin Hotels & Resorts located at Gulshan Avenue in Dhaka. It is located at Plot-01, Road-45, Gulshan-2, Dhaka-1212, Bangladesh.

== History ==
The Westin Dhaka was designed by architects Mohammad Foyez Ullah and Mustapha Khalid Palash. At 86 m (282 ft), it has 24 floors and was completed in 2006.

== See also ==
- List of tallest buildings in Bangladesh
- List of tallest buildings in Dhaka
