= Bangladesh Shooting Sport Federation =

Sports governing body

- বাংলাদেশ শুটিং স্পোর্টস ফেডারেশন
- Logo of Bangladesh Shooting Sport Federation
- Sport: Shooting
- Jurisdiction: Bangladesh
- Abbreviation: BSSF
- Founded: 1955; 71 years ago
- Affiliation: International Shooting Sport Federation
- Regional affiliation: Asian Shooting Confederation
- Headquarters: 144-Gulshan Avenue, Gulshan-1, Shooting Club Complex, Dhaka, Bangladesh
- Location: Dhaka, Bangladesh

Official website
- www.bssf.com.bd
- (Bangladesh)

The Bangladesh Shooting Sport Federation is the national sports federation responsible for promoting and regulating shooting sports in Bangladesh.

== History ==
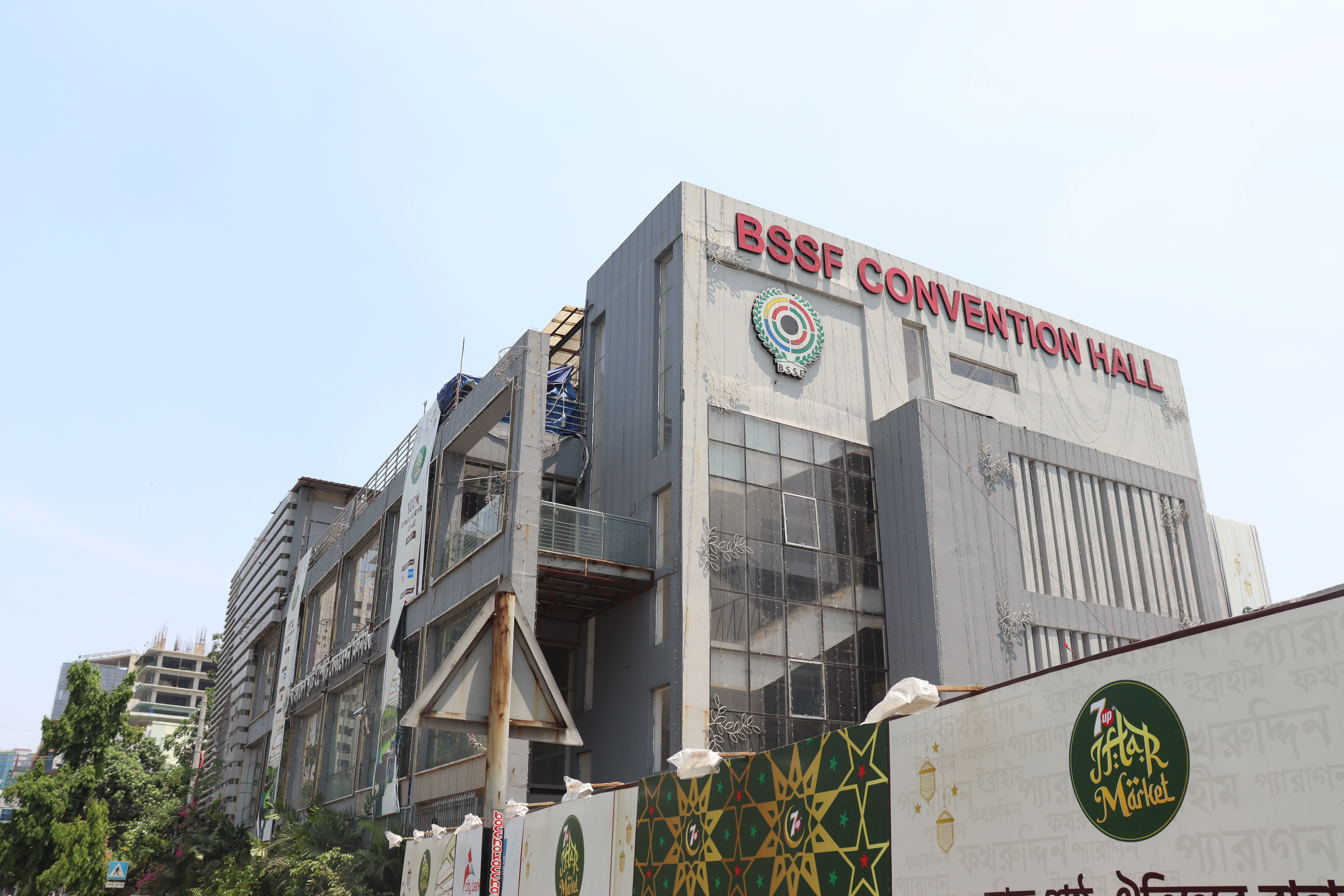
BSSF HQ, Gulshan

The Bangladesh Shooting Sport Federation was founded in 1955 by Lieutenant Colonel Hesamuddin Ahmed. The federation is located in Gulshan, Dhaka. Lieutenant General Ataul Hakim Sarwar Hasan was the President of Bangladesh Shooting Sports Federation.
