= Bampfylde Fuller =

Lieutenant Governor of the province of Eastern Bengal and Assam

Bampfylde Fuller KCSI CIE
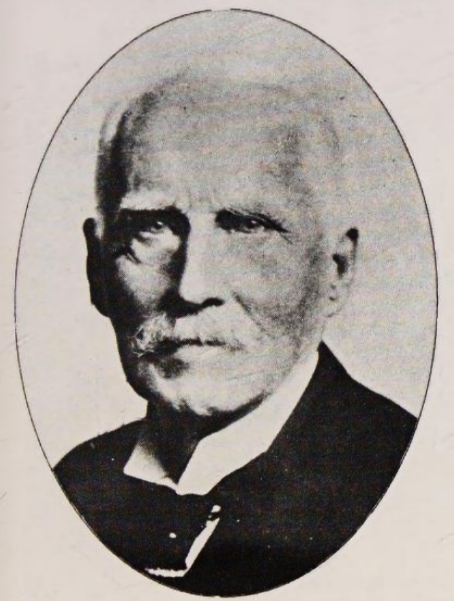
- Born: 20 March 1854
- Died: 29 November 1935 (aged 81)
- Education: Marlborough College

Sir Joseph Bampfylde Fuller KCSI CIE (20 March 1854 – 29 November 1935) was a British inventor, writer, and first lieutenant governor of the new province of Eastern Bengal and Assam, knighted for his service in India.

== Early life and career ==
Fuller studied at Marlborough College. In 1885, he began his Indian Civil Service career as the Commissioner of Settlements and Agriculture of Central Provinces. He became an additional member of the Viceroy's Council in 1899. He served as secretary to the government of India during the period 1901–02. He then served as chief commissioner of Assam during 1902–05.

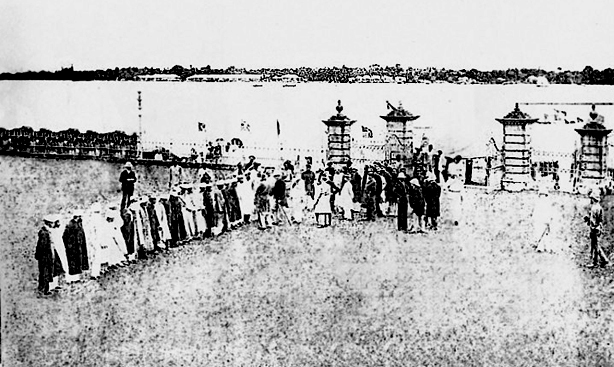
Fuller arrived in Dhaka in October 1905 to take up his duties as Lieutenant Governor of East Bengal and Assam

Fuller held office as Lieutenant Governor of Eastern Bengal and Assam from 16 October 1905 until he resigned on 20 August 1906 to Lord Minto over the (British) government of India's refusal to support reprisals against school agitators in Sirajganj.

In 1907, an abortive attempt was made by the Jugantar group on his life, which he escaped unharmed.

Fuller initiated the building of the Governor's residence in Dhaka, which became the Old High Court Building, Dhaka.

Fuller invented an anti-gas alarm widely used during World War I.

== Published books ==
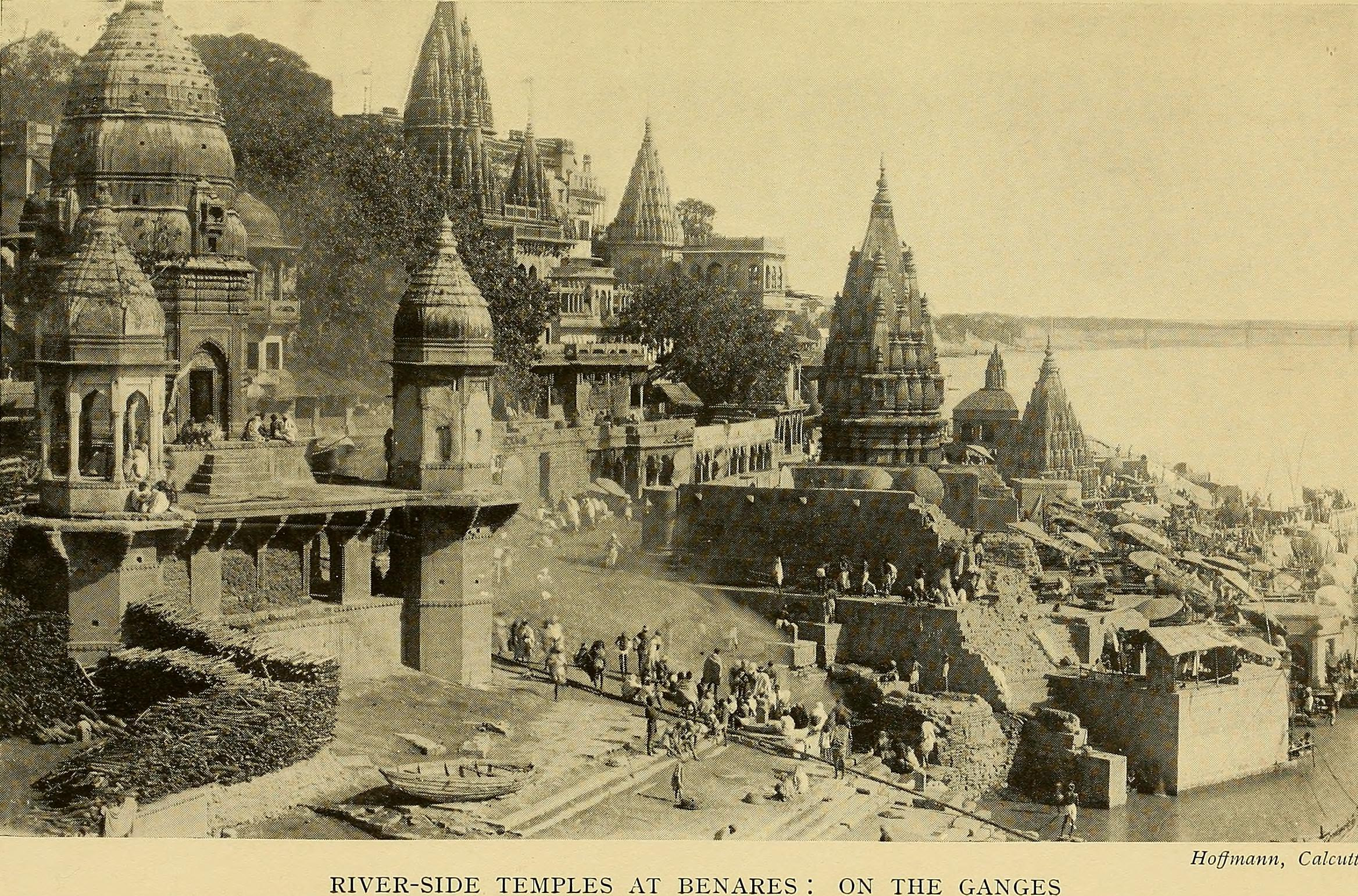
The empire of India (1913)

- Studies of Indian Life and Sentiment (1910)
- The Empire of India (1913)
- Life and Human Nature (1914)
- Man as he is : essays in a new psychology (1916)
- The Science of Ourselves (1921)
- Causes and Consequences (1923)
- The Law Within (1926)
- Etheric Energies (1928)
- Some Personal Experiences (1930)
- The Tyranny of the Mind (1935)

== Legacy ==
Fuller's chikila (Chikila fulleri), a fossorial amphibian, is named for him.

Fuller Road, at the heart of the University of Dhaka, is named after him.
