= Eastern Bengal and Assam =

Former province of British India

Coordinates: 23.7000°N 90.3500°E

- Province of British India
- 1905–1912
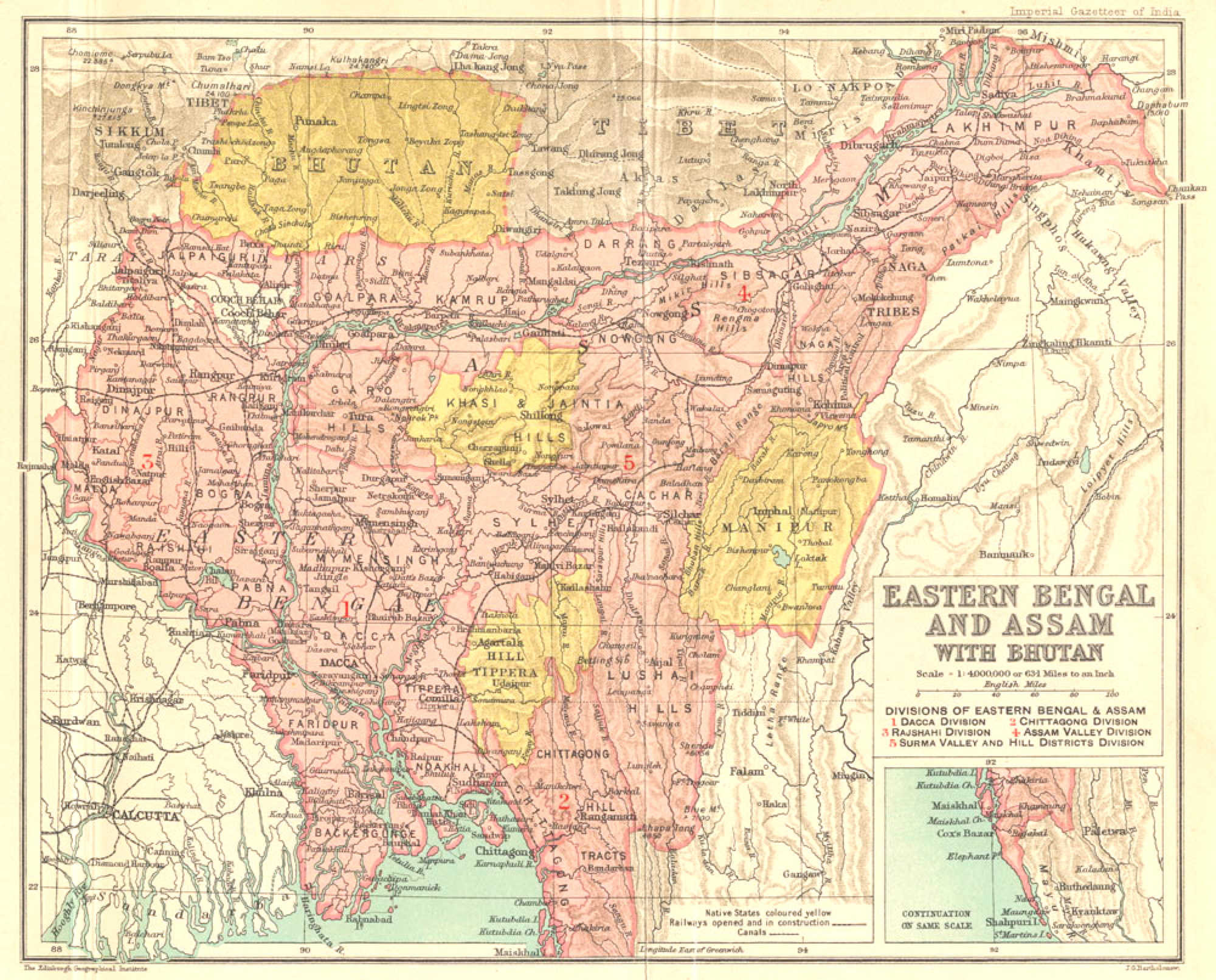
- Eastern Bengal and Assam in 1907, bordered by Bengal, Nepal, Bhutan, Burma and Tibet
- Capital: Dacca
- Government
- Lieutenant-Governor
  - 1905–1906: Sir Bampfylde Fuller
  - 1911–1912: Sir Charles Stuart Bayley
- Legislature: Legislative Council
- Historical era: New Imperialism
  - First Partition of Bengal: 16 October 1905
  - Creation of Bihar and Orissa Province and Assam Province: 21 March 1912
Preceded by	Succeeded by
Bengal Presidency; North-East Frontier	Province of Bengal; Assam Province
- Today part of: Bangladesh; India

Eastern Bengal and Assam was a province of British India between 1905 and 1912. Headquartered in the city of Dacca, it covered territories in what are now Bangladesh, Northeast India and Northern West Bengal.

== History ==
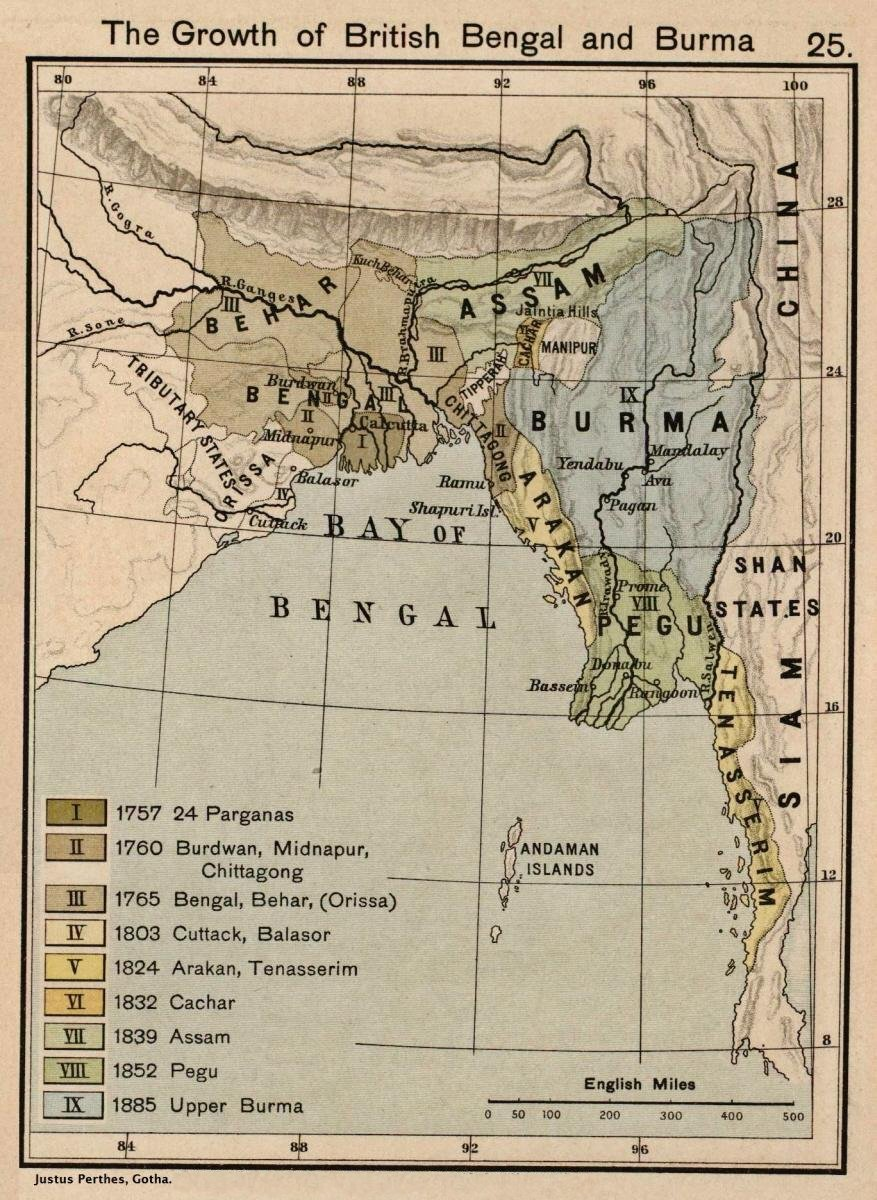
The British East India Company annexed Bengal in 1765, and Assam in 1838

As early as 1868, the government saw the need for an independent administration in the eastern portion of the Bengal Presidency. They felt that Fort William in Calcutta, the capital of British India, was already overburdened. By 1903, it dawned on the government on the necessity of partitioning Bengal and creating prospects for Assam's commercial expansion. It was promised to increase investment in education and jobs in the new province called Eastern Bengal and Assam.

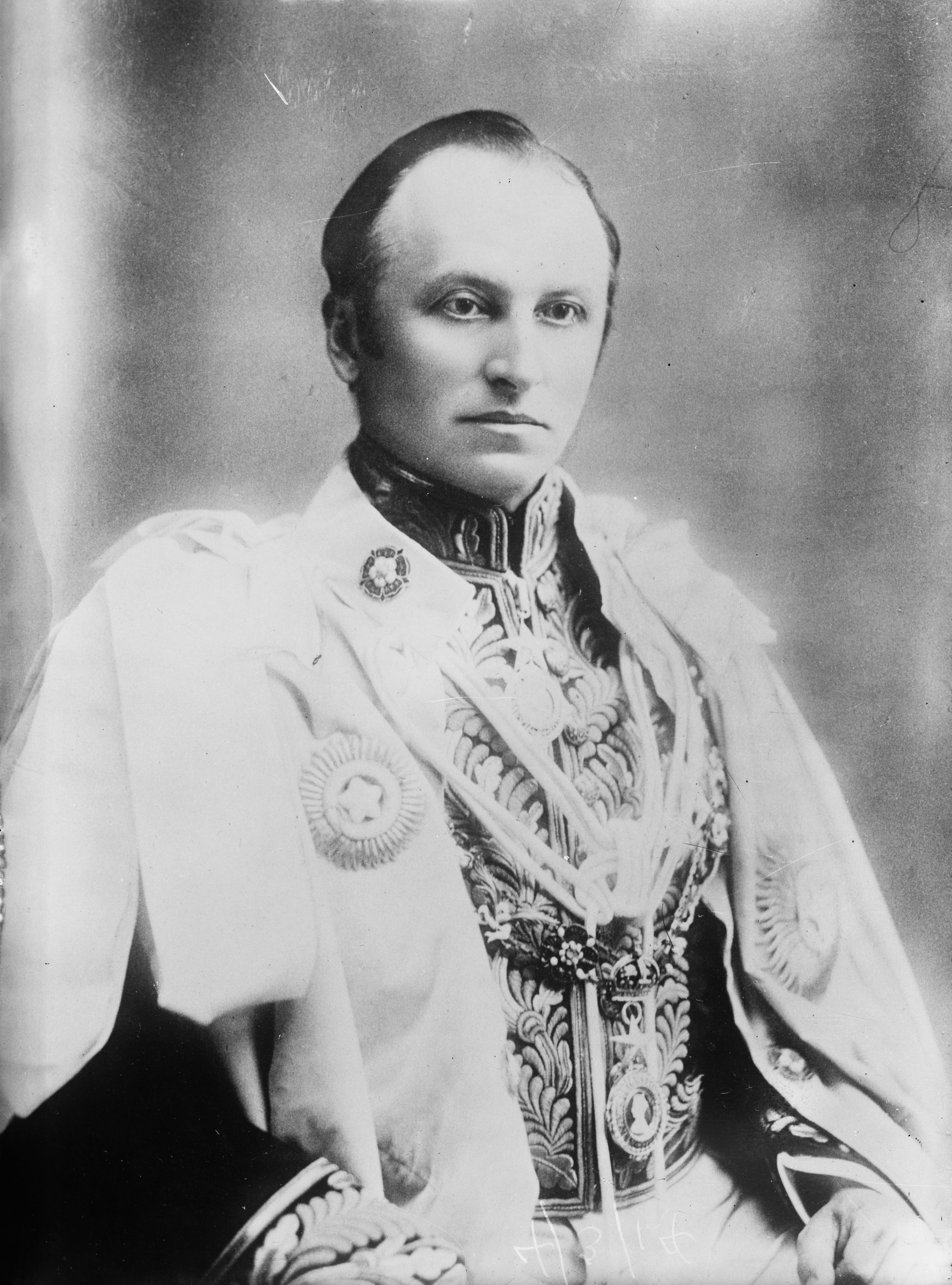
Lord Curzon initiated the creation of Eastern Bengal and Assam

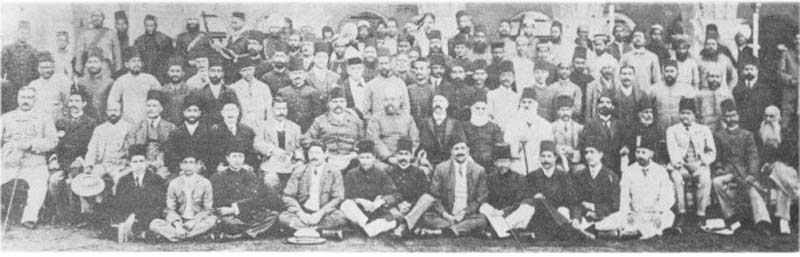
Founding conference of the All India Muslim League in Dacca, 1906

Lord Curzon, the Viceroy of India, proposed the Partition of Bengal and put it into effect on 16 October 1905. Dacca, the former Mughal capital of Bengal, regained its status as a seat of government. Sir Bampfylde Fuller was the province's first Lieutenant Governor. He served for a year in office, and resigned in 1906 after disagreements with Lord Minto and pressure from the British Parliament. He was succeeded by Sir Lancelot Hare (1906–1911), who in turn was succeeded by Sir Charles Stuart Bayley (1911–1912).

The partition stoked controversy among Indian nationalists, who described it as an attempt to "divide and rule" the Bengali homeland. The merchant class in Calcutta also feared losing their economic influence in the region. In 1906, the All India Muslim League was formed in Dacca during the All India Muhammadan Educational Conference, as a response to rising Hindu nationalism. This in turn sparked the creation of the All India Hindu Mahasabha. At the Delhi Durbar in 1911, King-Emperor George V announced that the British government had decided to annul the partition. This move was seen as an appeasement of hardline communal forces. Eastern Bengal was reunited with western Bengali districts, and Assam was made a chief commissioner's province.

== Geography ==
Eastern Bengal and Assam had a total area of 111,569 sq miles and was situated between 20° 45' and 28° 17' N., and between 87° 48' and 97° 5' E. It was bounded by Tibet and the Kingdom of Bhutan to the north, British Burma to the east and the Bay of Bengal to the south. Within these limits, were the princely states of Hill Tippera, Cooch Behar and Manipur.

== Administration ==
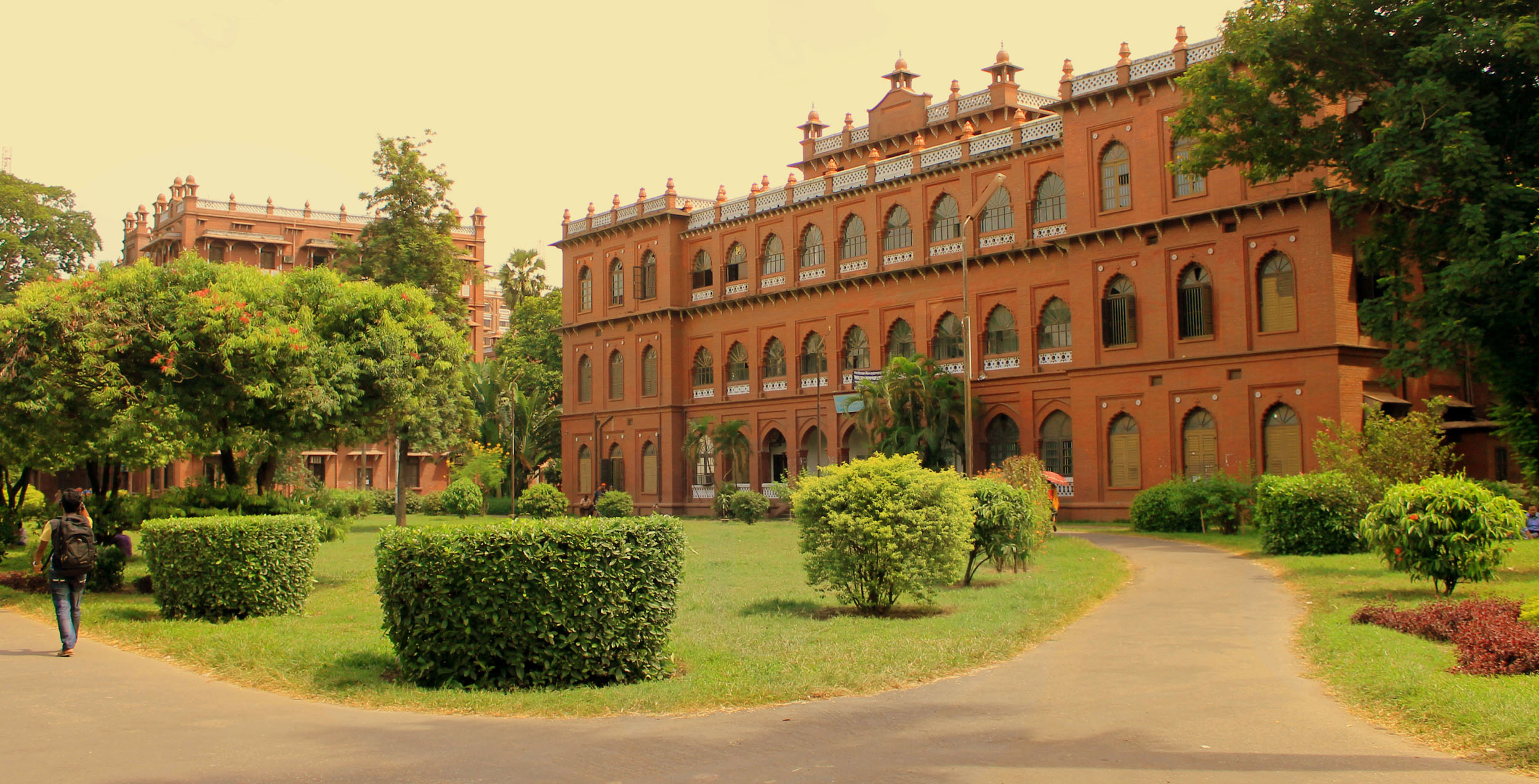
An example of European-Mughal architecture introduced in Dacca after the First Partition of Bengal

The Viceroy represented the British monarch and the Lieutenant Governor was the chief administrator. Dacca was the provincial capital, with the Legislative Council and the High Court. Five commissioners acted under the Lieutenant Governor.

The Eastern Bengal and Assam Legislative Council was composed of 40 members. Elected councillors included representatives of municipalities, district boards, Muslim electorates, the landowning gentry, the tea industry, the jute industry and the Port of Chittagong. Nominated members included government officials, educationists and commercial leaders.

The High Court of Dacca was subordinate to the Judicial Committee of the Privy Council in London.

Shillong was the summer capital of Eastern Bengal and Assam.

There were 5 administrative divisions in the province, including the Assam Valley Division, Chittagong Division, Dacca Division, Rajshahi Division and the Surma Valley Division. There were a total of 27 districts.

Division	Divisional Headquarters	Districts	Princely states
Assam Valley Division	Guwahati	Goalpara, Kamrup, the Garo Hills, Darrang, Nowgong, Sibsagar and Lakhimpur	Manipur
Chittagong Division	Chittagong	Tippera, Noakhali, Chittagong and the Hill Tracts	Hill Tripura
Dacca Division	Dacca	Dacca, Mymensingh, Faridpur and Backergunge	
Rajshahi Division	Jalpaiguri	Dinajpur, Jalpaiguri, Rangpur, Bogra, Pabna, Malda	Coach Behar
Surma Valley Division	Shilchar	Sylhet, Cachar, the Khasi and Jaintia Hills, the Naga Hills and the Lushai Hills	

Coach Behar fell under the jurisdiction of Rajshahi Division, Hill Tripura under Chittagong Division and Manipur under the Assam Valley Division. The provincial government in Dacca also managed relations with the Kingdom of Bhutan.

== Demographics ==
The population of Eastern Bengal and Assam was 30,961,459 in 1901. The densely populated districts in East Bengal and the Surma and Brahmaputra Valleys were home to Indo-Aryan ethnic groups, including the Bengalis (27,272,895) and the Assamese (1,349,784). Hill districts were home to a predominantly Tibeto-Burman population, including groups like the Tripuri people Tiprasa, Chakmas, Mizos, Nagas, Garos and Bodos. There were 18,036,688 Muslims and 12,036,538 Hindus. The remainder included Buddhists, Christians and animists.

With reference to the census in 1911, the population of Dhaka was 21% higher than that of 1906, when it was made the capital of the newly formed state.

== Economy ==
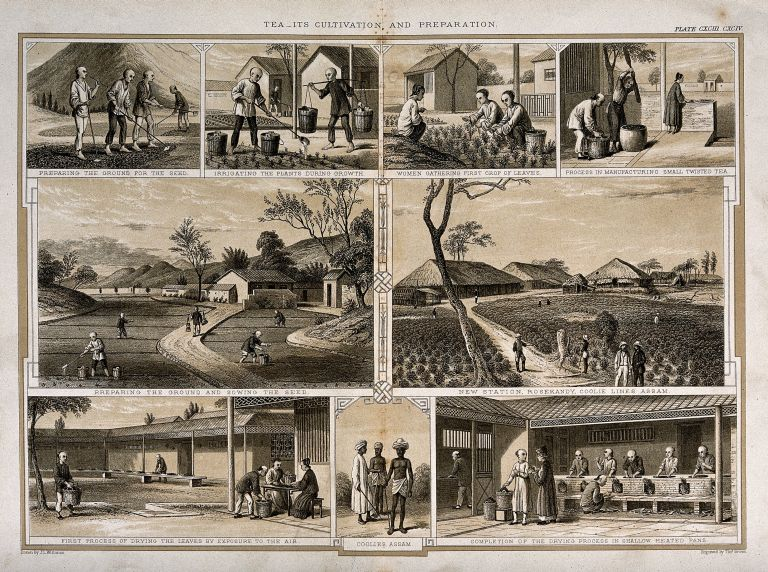
An illustration of tea cultivation in Eastern Bengal and Assam

Eastern Bengal and Assam possessed one of the most fertile lands in the British Empire. The eastern Bengal delta was the rice basket of the Indian subcontinent. It produced 80% of the world's jute, and dominated supply in the once thriving global jute trade. The Assam and Sylhet Valleys were home to the largest tea plantations in the world, and became famous for producing high-quality Assam tea. The province was also a center of the petroleum industry, due to crude oil production in Assam. The Port of Chittagong began to flourish in international trade, and was connected to its hinterland by the Assam Bengal Railway. Shipbuilding was a major activity in coastal Bengal, and catered to the British naval and merchant fleets. Dyeing industries were set up in several districts, particularly in Pabna and Dhaka.

== Transportation ==
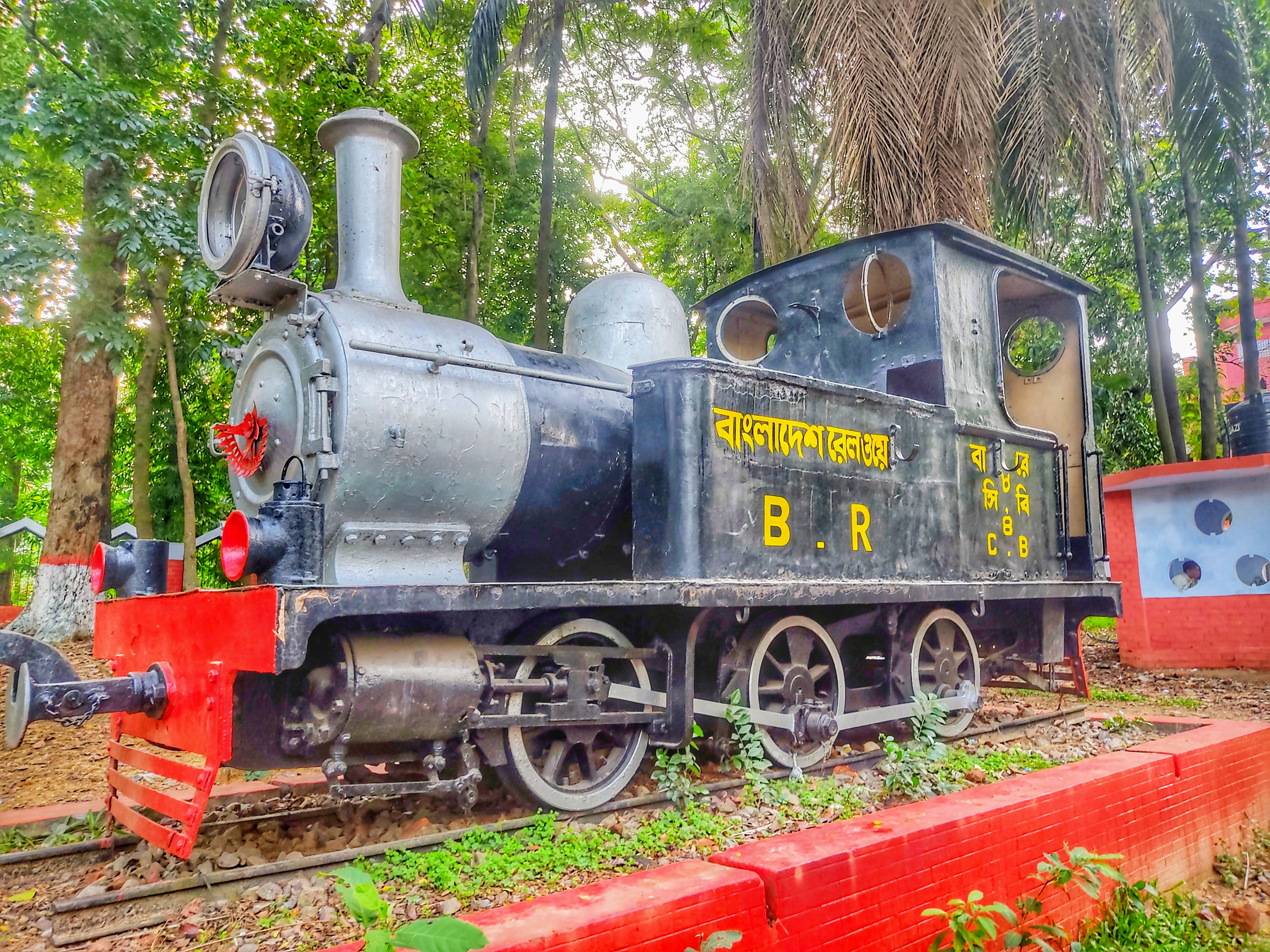
A 19th century train preserved at the Chittagong Central Railway Building

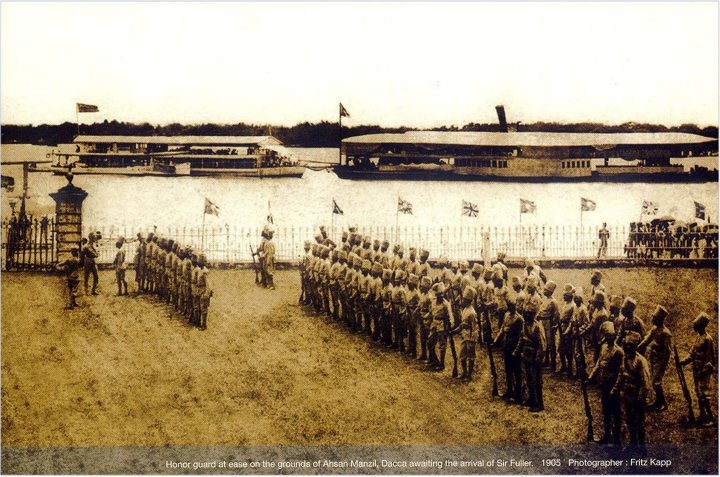
Ferries were an important mode of provincial transport. Seen here is the arrival of the British Viceroy in Dacca by a fleet of steamers in 1908

The two main rail lines in Eastern Bengal and Assam were the Eastern Bengal Railway and the Assam Bengal Railway. The port city of Chittagong was the main rail terminus, as routes connected the interior hinterland with the main regional maritime gateway. Railways were vital for the export of tea, jute and petroleum.

A number of new ferry services were introduced connecting Chittagong, Dhaka, Bogra, Dinajpur, Rangpur, Jalpaiguri, Maldah and Rajshahi. This improved communication network created a positive impact on overall economy, boosting trade and commerce. Newly built highways connected the inaccessible areas of Assam and the Chittagong Hill Tracts. All district capitals were connected by an inter-district road network.

== Military ==
The British Indian Army had cantonments in Dacca, Chittagong, Shillong, Comilla and Gauhati. The Assam Rifles guarded the eastern frontier of the province, while the Gurkha regiments and the Bengal Military Police patrolled northern borders.

== Education ==
Within its short lifespan, the Provincial Education Department promoted a significant expansion and improvement of higher education. Persian, Sanskrit, mathematics, history and algebra were among different disciplines introduced in the college level curriculum. Female colleges were established in each district. School enrollment increased by 20%. A committee was formed for the creation of the University of Dacca, which was established later in 1921, and came to be known as the "Oxford of the East".

== Legacy ==
The first partition of Bengal created a precedent for the second partition of Bengal. Bengal was partitioned again in 1947, making Muslim-majority districts a part of Pakistan. Later renamed East Pakistan, the region gained independence as the country of Bangladesh in 1971.

The Assam Province became a part of the Union of India, and was eventually divided into several states for the States Reorganisation Act, 1956; these states include Nagaland, Mizoram, Meghalaya, current-day Assam, Tripura and Manipur.

In modern times, Bangladesh and India have sought to revive British-era transport links. The BBIN Initiative has taken shape to promote economic integration and development in the region. The Bangladesh, China, India and Myanmar (BCIM) grouping also seeks to stimulate economic growth in this Asian sub-region.

== See also ==
- Bombay Presidency
- Madras Presidency
- List of lieutenant-governors of Eastern Bengal and Assam
