= Old High Court Building, Dhaka =

Building in Bangladesh

- পুরাতন হাইকোর্ট ভবন, ঢাকা (Bengali)
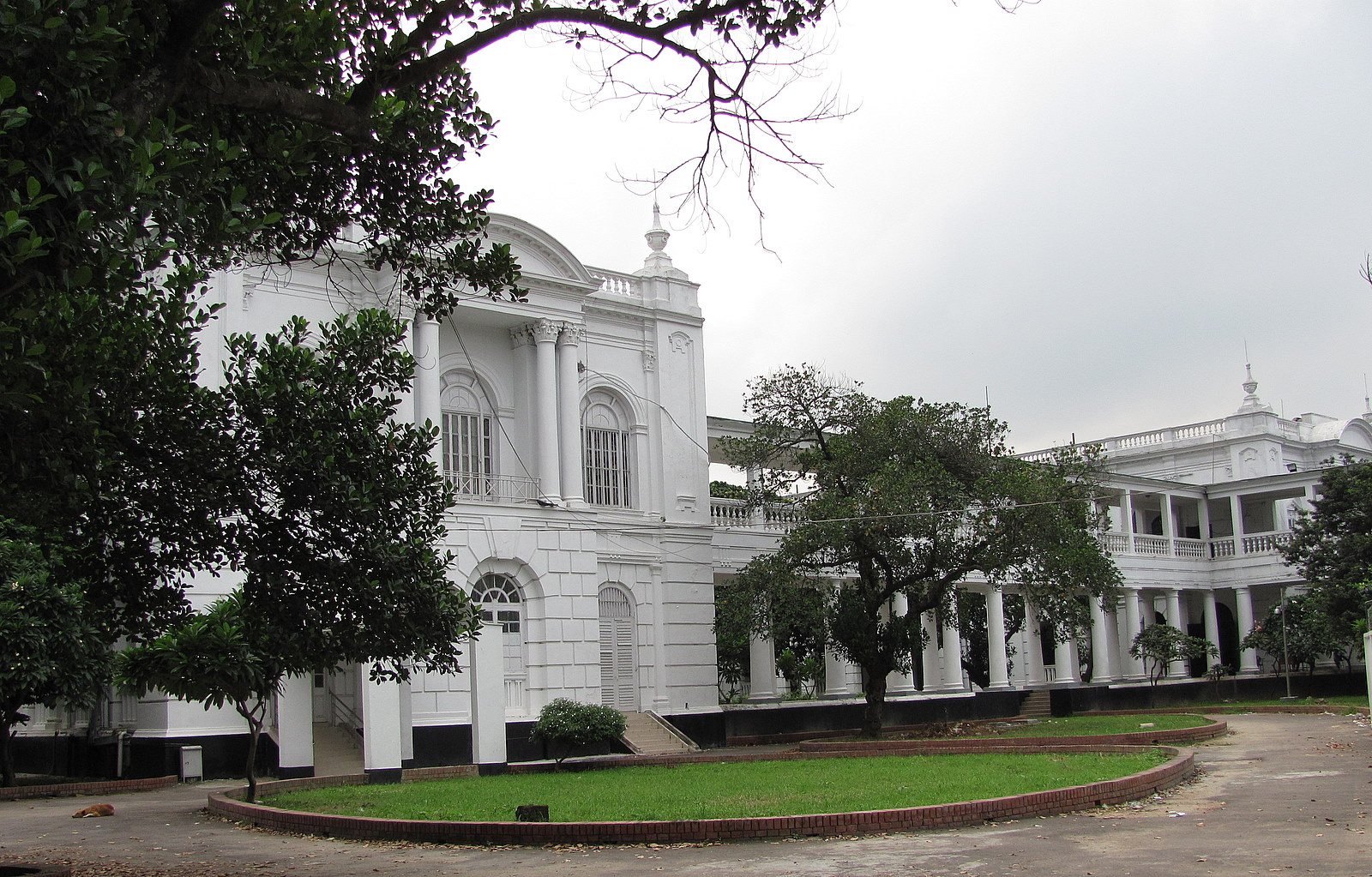
- Interactive map of Old High Court Building, Dhaka
- 23.7294°N 90.4023°E
- Location: Dhaka, Bangladesh

History
- Built: 1905

The Old High Court Building in Dhaka is situated at High Court Street, opposite the picturesque Curzon Hall. It was constructed in the beginning of the 20th century and designed by Chishty Brothers Architects and Engineers in Renaissance architectural style. It served as an official residence and governmental office before coming the High Court Building after the division of India in 1947.

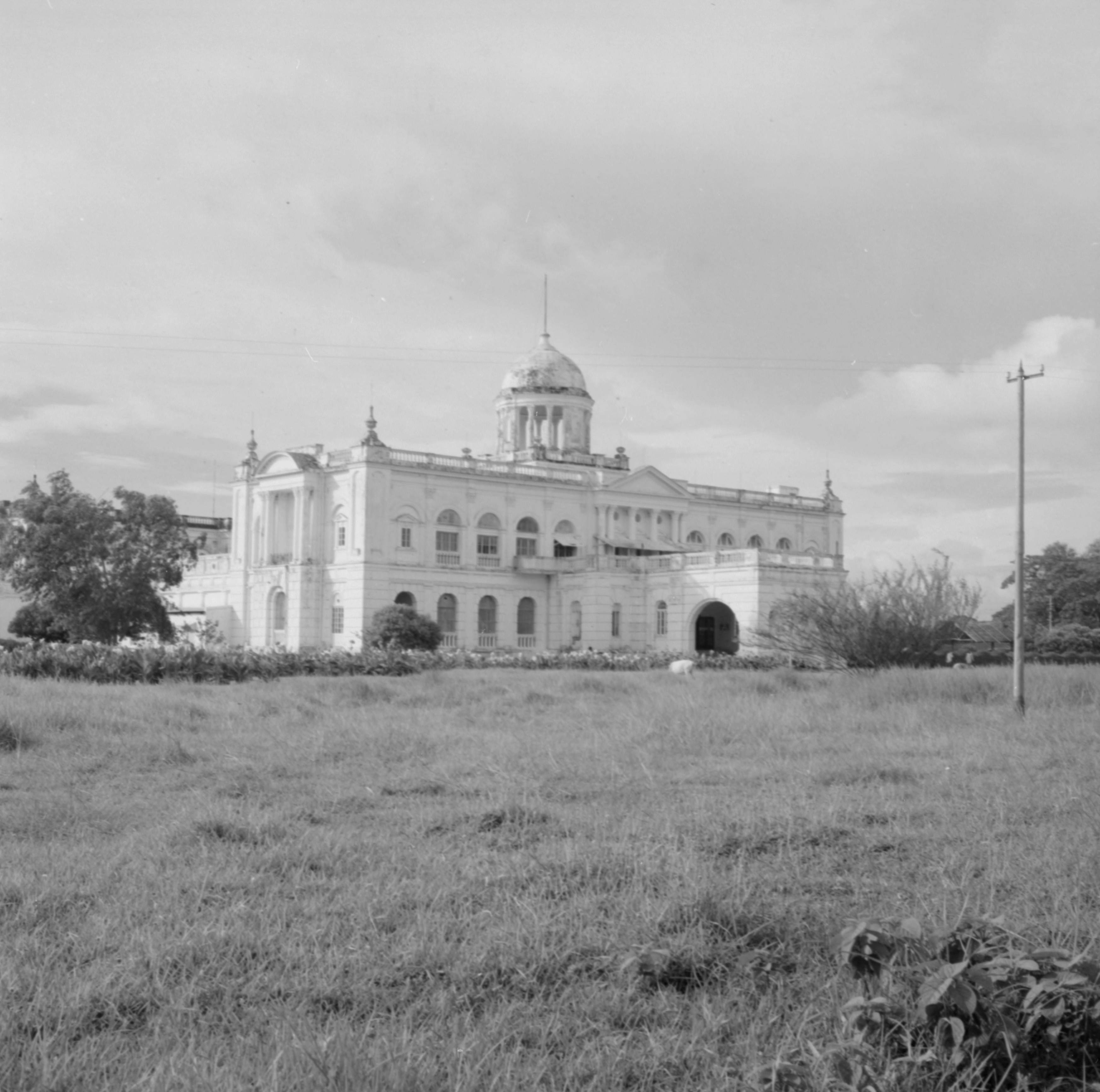
Old High Court Building in 1952

== Architectural significance ==
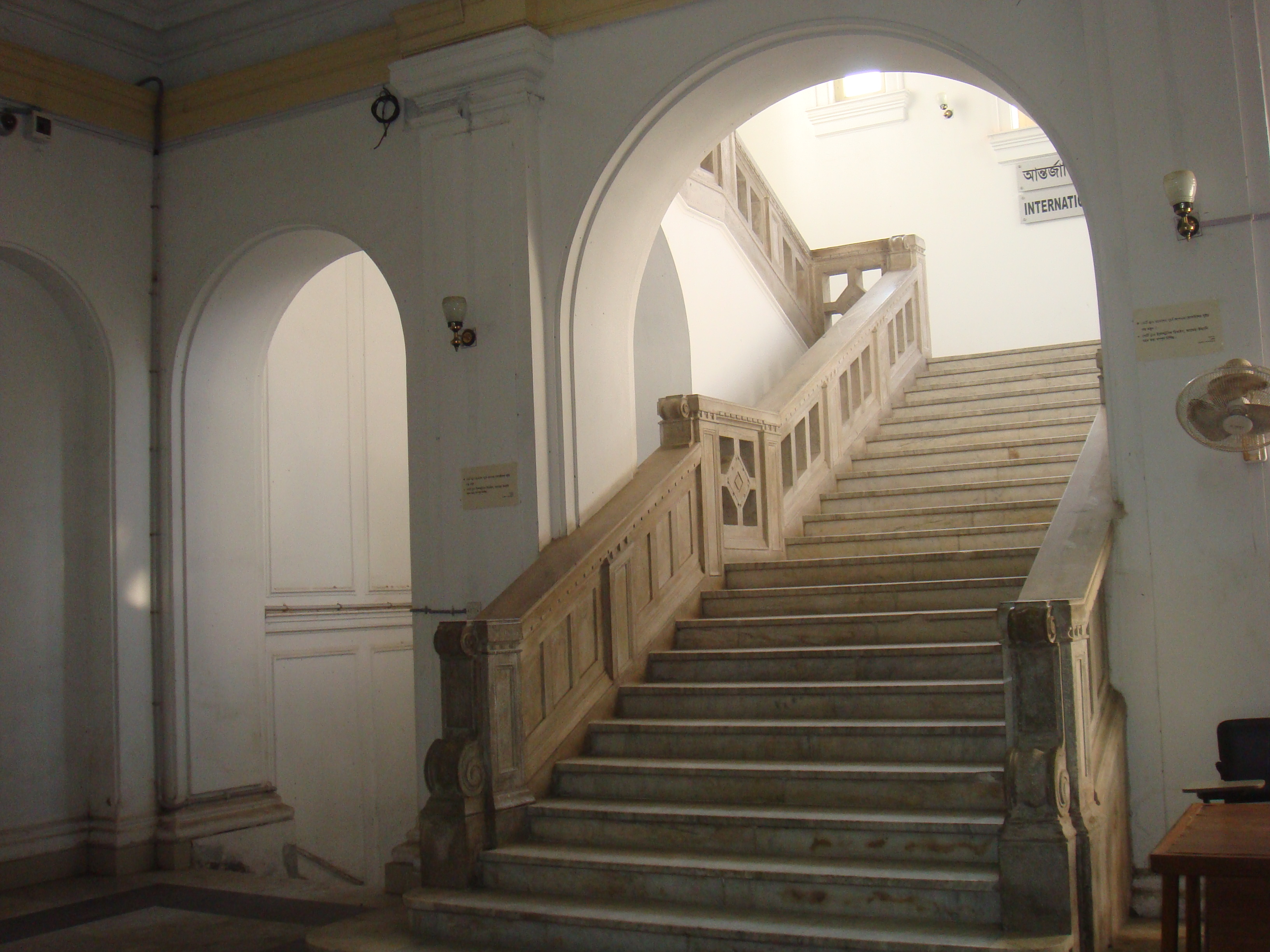
Interior staircase

This is the finest example in Dhaka of the European Renaissance style with few or no Mughal features.

== Present condition ==
It is now under the control of Supreme Court. Now it is divided into two parts, one part is being used for crime tribunal and the other part for law commission.

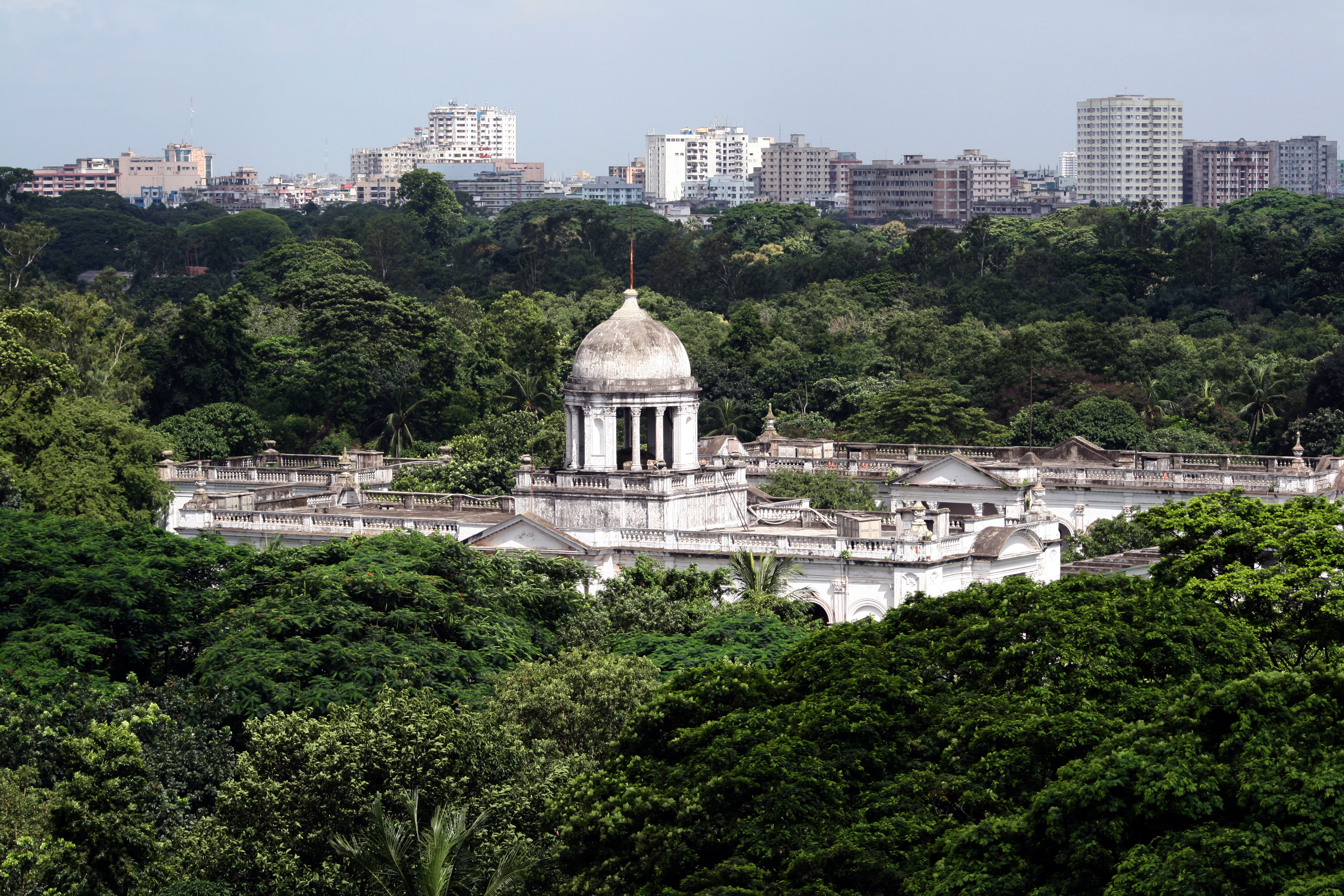

== Address ==
The Old High Court is situated at High Court Street, opposite the picturesque Curzon Hall, and skirting the Ramna Green, Dhaka.
