= Sudha Sadan =

Personal residence of Sheikh Hasina

Sudha Sadan was the personal residence of former prime minister and president of the Awami League Sheikh Hasina. The house was vandalized and burned down following the fall of the Sheikh Hasina-led Awami League government along with Bangabandhu Memorial Museum, the former residence of her father Sheikh Mujibur Rahman, in Dhanmondi. The museum was demolished.

== History ==
Sudha Sadan was named after Dr M. A. Wazed Miah, husband of Sheikh Hasina, who was known as Sudha Mia. They married on 17 November 1967. The house is located in Dhanmondi.

Prime Minister Khaleda Zia wanted to visit Sudha Sadan after the 2004 Dhaka grenade attack targeting former prime minister Sheikh Hasina but could not do so following strong opposition from the Awami League. Following the attack Hasina escape to Sudha Sadan, driven by Abdul Matin, and stayed in the house for 93 hours. Security had the residence was increased after the attack and threats form Islamic militants. She briefed the press on the attack at Sudha Sadan. Investigators from Interpol visited the house to examine Hasina's personal vehicle which had suffered damage in the attack. Hundreds of visitors came to the house to express their sympathy including Ambassador of the United States Harry K. Thomas Jr., Indian High Commissioner Veena Sikri, Rokanuddin Mahmud, Anwar Hossain Manju, Annisul Haq, Mustafizur Rahman, AK Azad Chowdhury, Kutubuddin Ahmed, Syed Manzur Elahi, and Sheikh Shahidul Islam. Former presidents of Bangladesh, AQM Badruddoza Chowdhury and Hussain Mohammad Ershad visited Hasina as well. In December, activists of the Awami League organized a reception from the airport to Sudha Sadan to welcome Hasina's son, Sajib Wazed Joy and his wife Christine.

Hundreds of activists of the Awami League bought cakes to the Sudha Sadan in September 2005 to celebrate the birthday of Sheikh Hasina. In December, she met with families of martyred intellectuals from the Bangladesh Liberation War at the Sudha Sadan. In January 2006, Christina B. Rocca, the US Assistant Secretary of State for South Asian Affairs, met Hasina at Sudha Sadan. The President Guard Regiment and the Special Security Force took over security of Sudha Sadan in October 2006. Rapid Action Battalion searched the premises while Navy divers cleared Dhanmondi Lake. They also took over security at the home of Khaleda Zia. Bangladesh Islami Oikya Jote, breakway fraction of the coalition government led by Bangladesh Nationalist Party, met with Hasina and agreed to join a program against the "autocratic" government.

A unit of the United Kingdom Awami League visited Sudha Sadan in January 2007. Joint forces raided Sudha Sadan on 8 March 2007 twice to search for Sheikh Helal and Bahauddin Nasim. In May 2007, three platoons of Bangladesh Police were deployed outside Sudha Sadan. Eleven check points were established on roads leading to Sudha Sadan and the road in front of the building was restricted to the public. In June, security was reduced at the house by the government. In July 2007, Sheikh Hasina was detained from Sudha Sadan and taken to a newly created sub-jail inside the parliament complex. Two of her cars were seized from the residence.

In June 2008, Sheikh Hasina sat with four advisors of the Chief Adviser Fakhruddin Ahmed-led interim government to discuss polls following her release from prison after 11 months. She held meetings with Awami League workers and told them to prepare for elections. She left the country for the United States from Sudha Sadan the same month. The Awami League organized a grand reception from the airport to Sudha Sadan after Hasina returned to Bangladesh in November 2008. Awami League nomination hopefuls collected nomination papers from Sudha Sadan. After she was elected prime minister, Hasina moved to Jamuna State Guest House from Sudha Sadan following the recommendation of the Special Security Force.

In May 2009, following the death of M. A. Wazed Miah, former prime minister Khaleda Zia went to Sudha Sadan to console his wife, Prime Minister Sheikh Hasina. Khaleda was accompanied by Khandaker Mosharraf Hossain, Khandaker Delwar Hossain, Moudud Ahmed, MK Anwar, Nazrul Islam Khan, Rizvi Ahmed, Sadeque Hossain Khoka, and Salauddin Quader Chowdhury. Syed Moazzem Hossain stated in October 2010, that Sudha Bhaban would be turned into a museum for President Ziaur Rahman if Khaleda Zia was evicted from her cantonment residence by the Awami League government.

In December 2018, Mashrafe Bin Mortuza visited the Sudha Sadan to join a video conference campaign event for Narail District with Prime Minister Sheikh Hasina. She campaigned from the Sudha Sadan.

A water boy, Jahangir Alam, at Sudha Sadhan made 4 billion BDT through corruption and laundered the money abroad, which came to light in 2024. Following the fall of the Sheikh Hasina-led Awami League government, the building was vandalized on 5 August 2024 and burned down in February 2025 while at the same time Bangabandhu Bhaban was demolished in the same neighborhood. The house was burned down as part of a wave of attacks targeting the homes of Awami League politicians. The Bangladesh Fire Service did not attempt to stop the fire as they felt insecure and stopped by protestors. It was part of a Bulldozer March.

In March 2025, Bangladesh Court ordered appointment of an administrator for Sudha Sadhan owned by Sajeeb Wajed Joy and Saima Wazed.

== See also ==
- Hawa Bhaban, the office of former prime minister Khaleda Zia
