= Moinul Islam Chowdhury =

Bangladeshi Judge

Md. Moinul Islam Chowdhury
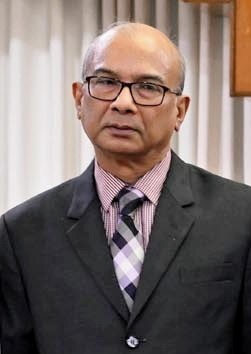
- Islam in 2025

Justice of the High Court Division of Bangladesh
- In office 1984–2024

Personal details
- Born: April 7, 1957 (age 69)
- Education: University of Dhaka
- Profession: Judge

Md. Moinul Islam Chowdhury is a retired justice of the High Court Division of Bangladesh Supreme Court. He was appointed Chairman of the National Human Rights Commission of Bangladesh in February 2026.

== Early life ==
Chowdhury was born on 7 April 1957. He completed his bachelor's in law and another in art from the University of Dhaka. He completed his master's in history from the University of Dhaka. He completed another law degree from the University of Essex and joined the Lincoln's Inn.

== Career ==
Chowdhury started his legal practice in 1984 at the Dhaka Court.

In 1986, Chowdhury became a lawyer on the High Court Division.

Chowdhury started practicing in the highest court of the country, the Appellate Division of Bangladesh Supreme Court, in 2002.

On 30 June 2009, Chowdhury was appointed an additional judge on the High Court Division and on 6 June 2011 his appointed to the court was made permanent.

In April 2013, Chowdhury and Justice Kazi Md Ejarul Haque Akondo convicted Dr Miah Mohiuddin in the case of the murder of S Taher Ahmed.

In April 2015, the corruption case against Zubaida Rahman, wife of Tareque Rahman, reached Chowdhury and Justice JBM Hassan's docket. The corruption case was filed on 26 September 2007 by the Anti Corruption Commission against Tareque Rahman, Zubaida Rahman, and Iqbal Mand Banu. In May, Hossain and Justice JBM Hassan dropped the bail petition of Bangladesh Nationalist Party politician Mirza Abbas. In March 2016, Hossain and Justice JBM Hassan declared the government eviction of stranded Pakistanis in Bangladesh outside of their designated refugee camp legal. It ordered the government to rehabilitate those who had Bangladesh identity papers and were loyal to the country.

On 4 January 2017, Chowdhury and Justice JBM Hassan ordered the investigation into the allegation against AKM Salim Osman of humiliating Shyamal Kanti Bhakta, principal of Piyar Sattar Latif High School in Narayanganj District. Hossain was sued under the Digital Security Act.

In August 2019, Chowdhury and Justice Khizir Hayat denied bail to Moazzem Hossain, a police officer and investigator of the murder of Nusrat Jahan Rafi, recording and releasing the dying statement of the murder victim on social media.

In March 2021, Chowdhury and Justice AKM Zahirul Huq upheld the corruption conviction on Awami League member of parliament Haji Mohammad Salim from April 2008.
