= Zaima Rahman =

Bangladeshi barrister

- জাইমা রহমান
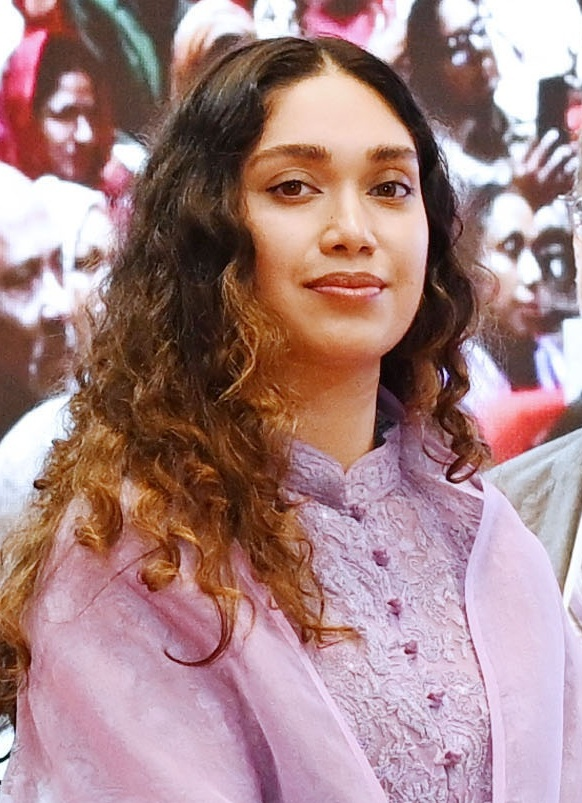
- Rahman in 2026
- Born: Zaima Zarnaz Rahman; 25 October 1995 (age 31); Dhaka, Bangladesh
- Citizenship: Bangladesh
- Education: Queen Mary University of London; Inner Temple
- Occupation: Barrister
- Political party: Bangladesh Nationalist Party
- Parent(s): Tarique Rahman (father); Zubaida Rahman (mother)
- Relatives: Khaleda Zia (paternal grandmother); Ziaur Rahman (paternal grandfather); Mahbub Ali Khan (maternal grandfather); Syeda Iqbal Mand Banu (maternal grandmother); Arafat Rahman (uncle); Irene Khan (aunt); M A G Osmani (grand-uncle)
- Family: Majumder-Zia family

Zaima Zarnaz Rahman (Note: Bengali: জাইমা জারনাজ রহমান, romanized: Jāimā Jārnāj Rôhômān, pronounced [ˈd͡ʒai̯ma ˈd͡ʒaɾnad͡ʒ ˈɾɔɦoman]) (born 25 October 1995), better known as Zaima Rahman, is a British-Bangladeshi barrister and a legal officer for the UN General Assembly President's Office.

She is the only daughter of Tarique Rahman, the Prime minister of Bangladesh, and the granddaughter of former Bangladeshi Prime Minister Khaleda Zia and former President Ziaur Rahman.

== Early life and education ==
Rahman was born on 25 October 1995. Her father, Tarique Rahman, is the current Prime Minister of Bangladesh, and her mother, Zubaida Rahman, is a physician. She grew up at her grandmother's Dhaka Cantonment residence before moving to London after her father was arrested and released on bail in 2008.

Rahman went to the International School Dhaka before moving to the United Kingdom. She obtained her law degree from Queen Mary University of London and was called to the Bar-at-law at the Inner Temple in 2019.

Zaima Rahman and her family members with Muhammad Yunus at the State Guest House, 2026

== Career ==
Rahman is a barrister. In September 2026, she was appointed as the legal officer at the office of the president of the 81st session of the United Nations General Assembly (UNGA).

=== Politics ===
Rahman first received media attention when she accompanied her grandmother, Khaleda Zia, to the voting centre in the 2001 Bangladeshi national elections, where her grandmother's party won a landslide victory. She came to national attention after Awami League minister Murad Hasan made a number of derogatory remarks against her. He was later forced to resign, and an arrest warrant was issued against him for defamation.

After the July Revolution, Rahman took a more prominent role and frequently represented her father at various events. She attended the National Prayer Breakfast in Washington, D.C., on behalf of her father. She was part of a BNP delegation that included Mirza Fakhrul and Amir Khasru. During that visit, Rahman met with former South Carolina governor and former executive director of the World Food Programme David Beasley, former assistant secretary of state at the US Department of State Robert A. Destro, and Rebekah Wagner, head of the US Women's Fellowship Foundation. On 23 November 2025, Rahman attended her first meeting for the Bangladesh Nationalist Party, where party leaders Mahbub Uddin Khokon and Ruhul Kabir Rizvi, along with a team of European representatives, also attended.

On 25 December 2025, she returned to Bangladesh with her parents. During the 2026 Bangladesh national election, she rigorously campaigned on behalf of her father in Dhaka-17.

Zaima has been seen attending high-level talks and meetings, including important diplomatic engagement alongside her father, Prime Minister Tarique Rahman.

On 18 January 2026, Rahman delivered a special address at an event titled "Women Shaping the Nation: Policy, Possibility and the Future of Bangladesh," held at the KIB Complex in Dhaka. In the course of her address, she posited that gender equality constitutes not merely a women's issue, but an economic and national imperative. She observed that, notwithstanding substantial advancements in female education, women's labour force participation in Bangladesh remains below 40 per cent, whereas that of men exceeds 80 per cent, and ascribed the withdrawal of numerous women from remunerated employment following marriage or childbirth not to deficiencies in capability or ambition, but to systemic presumptions that women will assume unpaid care and domestic responsibilities. Rahman further contended that policies and access alone are inadequate for the realisation of equality, and that empowerment remains precarious where social norms, quotidian expectations, and prevailing mindsets persist in inequality. She characterised inequality as frequently perpetuated through habit and comfort—through that which is perceived as normal—rather than exclusively through overt discrimination. Rahman additionally stated that her conception of women's leadership was informed by her familial milieu, wherein she observed women exercising leadership in both private and public spheres while men stood alongside them as equals, a value she attributed to the lives of her grandparents and parents. Additional speakers at the event included Fahmida Khatun, executive director of the Centre for Policy Dialogue, and Tamara Abed, a social entrepreneur and founder of a women-led enterprise.
