= Spouse of the Prime Minister of Bangladesh =

- Current; Zubaida Rahman since 17 February 2026
- Residence: 196, Gulshan Avenue, Dhaka
- Formation: 10 April 1971 (55 years ago)
- First holder: Syeda Zohra Tajuddin

The Spouse of the Prime Minister of Bangladesh is the wife or husband of the Prime Minister of Bangladesh. The role carries no official constitutional or statutory status, and the spouse receives no salary or defined public duties. In practice, spouses have traditionally attended social functions, official receptions, and ceremonial engagements alongside the prime minister, without a formal participatory role in government.

To date, eight women and two men have been married to a prime minister of Bangladesh while in office. Two prime ministers - Tajuddin Ahmad and Sheikh Mujibur Rahman - were later assassinated, leaving their wives widowed, and the country has otherwise seen frequent turnover in the role amid a series of short-lived governments.

The current prime minister, Tarique Rahman, has been married to Zubaida Rahman since 1994.

== Role and duties ==
The position of spouse of the prime minister of Bangladesh has traditionally been a low-profile one, largely confined to hosting duties and attendance at state functions, with most holders of the role keeping little public presence of their own, a pattern reinforced by the fact that several prime ministers held office as widowers, with no spouse performing the role at all.

Dr. Zubaida Rahman has broken from this pattern, becoming the most publicly visible spouse in the role's history. Since her husband's swearing-in as prime minister in February 2026, she has taken on an active public advocacy role on women's health and family policy, drawing on her background as a physician. That month, she announced BNP plans to establish a Women Support Cell and expand safe-childbirth facilities at the upazila level, alongside pledges on paid maternity leave, prevention of child marriage, and free education for female students through the postgraduate level.

== List of spouses ==
Image	Spouse	Date of birth	Date of marriage	Prime Minister	Date tenure began	Age at start of tenure	Date tenure ended	Date of death
Portrait of Syeda Zohra Tajuddin	Syeda Zohra Tajuddin	24 Dec 1932	1959	Tajuddin Ahmad	10 Apr 1971	38 years	12 Jan 1972	20 Dec 2013 (Aged 80)
Portrait of Sheikh Fazilatunnesa Mujib	Sheikh Fazilatunnesa Mujib	8 Aug 1930	1938	Sheikh Mujibur Rahman	12 Jan 1972	41 years	25 Jan 1975	15 Aug 1975 (Aged 45)
	Begum Amina Mansur	—	—	Muhammad Mansur Ali	25 Jan 1975	—	15 Aug 1975	—
	Ambia Khatun	—	—	Shah Azizur Rahman	15 Apr 1979	—	24 Mar 1982	10 Oct 2020
	Akramunnessa Khan	—	—	Ataur Rahman Khan	30 Mar 1984	—	9 Jul 1986	—
	Begum Sajeda Mizan Chowdhury	—	—	Mizanur Rahman Chowdhury	9 Jul 1986	—	27 Mar 1988	—
	Hasna Jasimuddin Moudud	—	—	Moudud Ahmed	27 Mar 1988	—	12 Aug 1989	—
	Momtaz Begum	—	—	Kazi Zafar Ahmed	12 Aug 1989	—	6 Dec 1990	—
Portrait of Ziaur Rahman	Ziaur Rahman (Note: Ziaur Rahman was assassinated on 30 May 1981, over a decade before his wife Khaleda Zia's premierships; no spouse performed the role's ceremonial functions during either of her three terms.)	19 Jan 1936	1960	Khaleda Zia	20 Mar 1991	—	30 Mar 1996	30 May 1981 (Aged 45)
Portrait of Ziaur Rahman	Ziaur Rahman	19 Jan 1936	1960	Khaleda Zia	10 Oct 2001	—	29 Oct 2006	30 May 1981 (Aged 45)
Portrait of M. A. Wazed Miah	M. A. Wazed Miah (Note: M. A. Wazed Miah died on 9 May 2009. Sheikh Hasina's sister, Sheikh Rehana, performed hostess duties during Hasina's subsequent terms.)	16 Feb 1942	17 Nov 1967	Sheikh Hasina	23 Jun 1996	54 years	15 Jul 2001	9 May 2009 (Aged 67)
Portrait of M. A. Wazed Miah	M. A. Wazed Miah	16 Feb 1942	17 Nov 1967	Sheikh Hasina	6 Jan 2009	54 years	5 Aug 2024	9 May 2009 (Aged 67)
Portrait of Zubaida Rahman	Zubaida Rahman (née Khan)	18 May 1972	3 Feb 1994	Tarique Rahman	17 Feb 2026	53 years	Incumbent	Living (Age 54)

== See also ==
- List of prime ministers of Bangladesh
- Sheikh family of Tungipara
- Majumder–Zia family
- First Lady of Bangladesh
