= Battle of Begums =

Term referring to political rivalry in Bangladeshi politics

- Part of the politics of Bangladesh
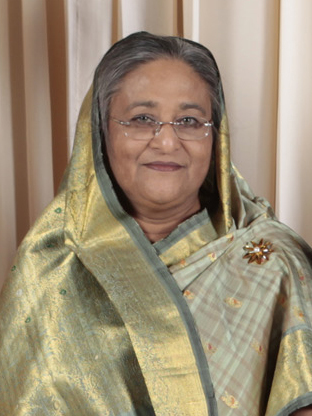
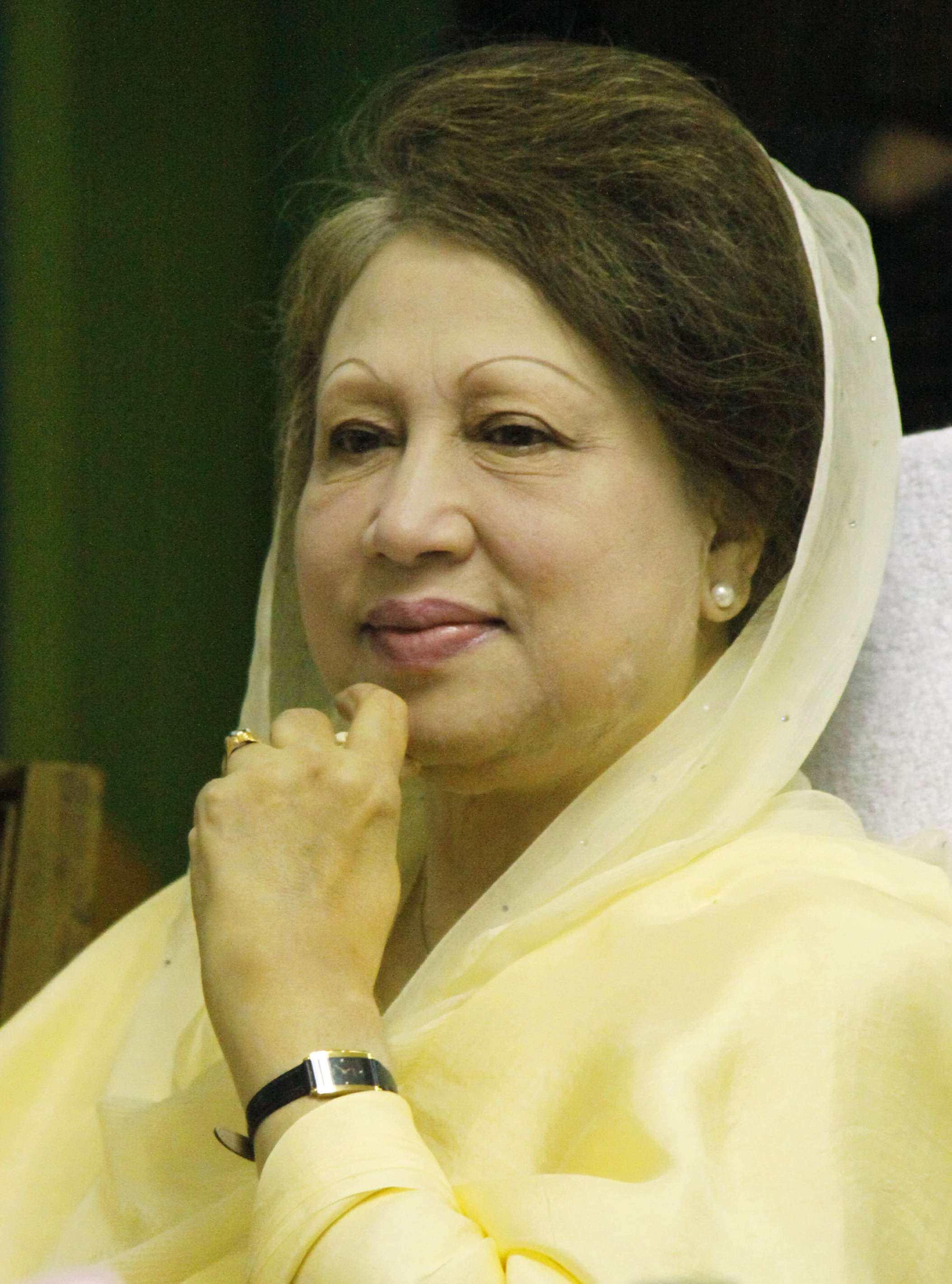
- The two Begums, Sheikh Hasina (left) and Khaleda Zia (right)
- Date: 10 May 1984 – 30 December 2025 (41 years, 7 months and 20 days)
- Caused by: Assassinations of Sheikh Mujibur Rahman and Ziaur Rahman; Dynastic politics
- Result: Conclusion with death of Khaleda Zia and overthrow of Sheikh Hasina: Success in the 1990 Bangladesh mass uprising; BNP's victory in the 1991, Feb 1996 and 2001 general elections; AL's victory in the Jun 1996, 2008, 2014, 2018, 2024 general elections; Introduction of the caretaker government system in Bangladesh; 2006–2008 and 2015 political crises; Khaleda Zia's imprisonment between 2018 and 2024; July Uprising and Sheikh Hasina's fall and exile to India; Polarization in Bangladeshi politics

Parties
Awami League; Sheikh family	Bangladesh Nationalist Party; Zia family

Lead figures
Sheikh Hasina	Khaleda Zia

In Bangladeshi politics, the term Battle of Begums (Bengali: বেগমদের যুদ্ধ) refers to the political rivalry between Sheikh Hasina of the Awami League and Khaleda Zia of the Bangladesh Nationalist Party.

== History ==
Khaleda Zia's political journey is deeply intertwined with the history of Bangladesh's post-independence era. Born on 15 August 1945, she became a prominent figure in the country's political landscape after the assassination of her husband, General Ziaur Rahman, who had served as both the president and a key military leader. Ziaur Rahman's rise to power in 1975 dramatically reshaped the political situation of Bangladesh.

In the wake of the assassination of Sheikh Mujibur Rahman, the founding leader of Bangladesh, General Ziaur Rahman who was the army chief at the time, seized control of the country and ousted President Khondaker Mostaq Ahmad, establishing a military dictatorship that lasted until his own assassination in 1981. During his rule, Ziaur Rahman made significant changes to Bangladesh's political and legal framework, most notably introducing the Indemnity Law (1975), which granted immunity to those involved in the assassination of Sheikh Mujib. This law was controversial and was repealed by the Awami League government in 1996.

Ziaur Rahman's political strategies were characterized by his efforts to consolidate power through a blend of military control, Islamic nationalism, and anti-Indian sentiment. He granted amnesty to the assassins of Sheikh Mujibur Rahman and integrated them into the political system. Furthermore, he allowed the return of Jamaat-e-Islami (JeI) and other pro-Pakistan groups, whose leaders had been accused of collaborating with the Pakistani military during the 1971 Bangladesh Liberation War. These groups, which had been banned after the war, were allowed to re-enter the political arena under Zia's regime.

Ziaur Rahman's influence on the political culture of Bangladesh continued after his death in 1981. His widow, Khaleda Zia took the helm of the Bangladesh Nationalist Party (BNP) which he had founded, and led the party to significant electoral victories. Khaleda Zia's rise to the political forefront came in the context of a divided Bangladesh, where the political rivalry between the BNP and the Awami League was increasingly intense

Khaleda Zia became the first woman to hold the office of Prime Minister of Bangladesh, serving two terms first from 1991 to 1996 and then from 2001 to 2006. Her terms in office were marked by her alliance with JeI, a move that was both praised by her supporters and criticized by her detractors. Her tenure also saw a deterioration in relations between Bangladesh and India, as issues such as border security and water sharing became contentious.

Throughout her political career, Khaleda Zia has been a polarizing figure. While her leadership of the BNP cemented her place in the history of Bangladesh's politics, it also brought her into conflict with political opponents, particularly Sheikh Hasina of the Awami League. The political rivalry between the two women has shaped much of the country's modern political landscape.

== Aftermath ==
Use of the term declined as Sheikh Hasina remained in power after becoming prime minister again in 2009, while Khaleda Zia was placed under arrest. Hasina was ousted and fled Bangladesh on August 5, 2024, during the July Uprising and Zia was later freed. Zia died on December 30, 2025, at the age of 80.

== Current situation ==
Since the July Uprising, the Awami League, led by Sheikh Hasina has faced legal challenges and political pressure.

On 15 January 2025, the Supreme Court overturned Khaleda Zia's conviction in a corruption case related to charitable donations dating back to 2008. This ruling theoretically allowed her to resume political activities or contest upcoming elections Subsequently, on 6 May 2025, Khaleda Zia returned to Dhaka after receiving medical treatment in London a move widely interpreted as a strong indication of the BNP's possible return to prominence.

On the other hand, Sheikh Hasina has faced ongoing judicial investigations since 2024 concerning corruption and serious allegations, including charges of crimes against humanity reported in the media. On 27 November 2025, a court sentenced her to 21 years in prison on corruption charges, placing her in a legally and politically vulnerable position and potentially opening the door for a renewed political contest.

Khaleda Zia died on 30 December 2025, ending the 30-year long battle of the Begums.

With Khaleda's death and Hasina's exile to India, Bangladesh has faced its first election without either of the two Begums in the 2026 Bangladeshi general election. The election was won by the Bangladesh Nationalist Party, which is led by Tarique Rahman, the son of the late Khaleda Zia.
