= S.M. Abul Kalam Azad =

S.M. Abul Kalam Azad may refer to:

- S.M. Abul Kalam Azad (politician)
- S. M. Abul Kalam Azad (admiral)
