= Kazi Mozammel Haque =

Bangladeshi politician

Member of Bangladesh Parliament
- In office 1973–1976
- Succeeded by: Abdur Rouf

Personal details
- Political party: Bangladesh Awami League

Kazi Mozammel Haque is a Bangladesh Awami League politician and a former member of parliament for Dhaka-17.

== Career ==
Haque was elected to parliament from Dhaka-17 as a Bangladesh Awami League candidate in 1973.
