= Abdur Rouf (Dhaka politician) =

Bangladeshi politician

Member of Bangladesh Parliament
- In office 1979–1986
- Preceded by: Kazi Mozammel Haque
- Succeeded by: Hussain Muhammad Ershad

Personal details
- Born: 1 February 1931
- Political party: Bangladesh Nationalist Party

Abdur Rouf is a Bangladesh Nationalist Party politician and a former member of parliament for Dhaka-17.

== Biography ==
Abdur Rouf was born on 1 February 1931.

Rouf was elected to parliament from Dhaka-17 as a Bangladesh Nationalist Party candidate in 1979.
