= Majumder–Zia family =

Bangladeshi political family

Zia family জিয়া পরিবার
- Political family
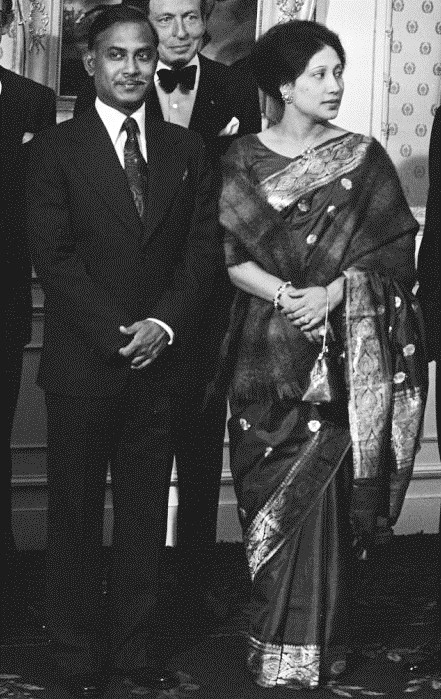
- Zia couple in 1979
- Current region: Bangladesh; United Kingdom; Malaysia
- Origin: Bengal (Mandal family); Middle East (Khan-Majumdar family)
- Founded: c. 1840; 186 years ago (Note: With the birth of Muminuddin Mandal)
- Founder: Muminuddin Mandal (Mandal family); Murad Khan (Majumder family)
- Current head: Tarique Rahman
- Titles: Prime Minister of Bangladesh; President of Bangladesh
- Members: Full list: Ziaur Rahman; Khaleda Zia; Tarique Rahman; Arafat Rahman; Zubaida Rahman; Zaima Rahman; Sharmila Sithi; Zahia Rahman; Zaifa Rahman
- Connected families: Khan Majumdars of Fulgazi
- Distinctions: Political prominence within the Bangladesh Nationalist Party
- Traditions: Sunni Islam
- Estate: Bagbari Zia Bari

The Majumder–Zia family (Bengali: মজুমদার–জিয়া পরিবার), or simply the Zia family (জিয়া পরিবার), is one of the two most prominent Bangladeshi political families, alongside the Sheikh family, it leads the Bangladesh Nationalist Party. Members of the family include – Ziaur Rahman served as army chief and later President of Bangladesh and Khaleda Zia as Prime Minister of Bangladesh, while several others have been members of the parliament.

== Background of the families ==
=== Mandals of Mahishaban ===
Kakar Mandal was the great-grandson of Muminuddin Mandal (d. 1840), a powerful leader and Mandal from the village of Mahishaban in Gabtali, Bogra. Muminuddin Mandal's influence was spread out across Gabtali, Sukhanpukur and other areas west of the Jamuna River.

- Kamaluddin Mandal (born 1854): He was the only son of Kakar Mandal. He was a moulvi and local educationist who served as the principal of Bagbari Minor School. He moved from Mahishaban to Bagbari after marrying Begum Meherunnisa. His wife's ancestors migrated from Iran to Balurghat, Ghoraghat during the Mughal period, and moved to Bogra during the reign of Emperor Aurangzeb. It was from this marriage that Kamaluddin Mandal inherited land from that landowning family in the village of Bagbari and moved there.
1. Mahmud Mandal: Skin merchant
2. Zahiruddin Mandal: Landlord
3. Mazhabuddin Mandal
4. Moazzam Hossain Mandal: Engineer.
5. Mansur Rahman Mandal (died 1966): chemist who specialised in paper and ink chemistry and worked for a government department at Writers' Building in Kolkata. He married Jahanara Khatun
  1. Rezaur Rahman Mandal, marine engineer
  2. Mizanur Rahman Mandal, economist
  3. Ziaur Rahman (see below)
  4. Ahmad Kamal Mandal (d. 2017)
  5. Khalilur Rahman Mandal (d. 2014): He was a pharmacist based in Maryland and had three daughters.
6. Major Muhammad Mamtazur Rahman Mandal: Medical officer for Pakistan Army
7. Mahfuzur Rahman Mandal: Income tax practitioner
8. Fatema Khatun: Married an SDO under the Maharaja of Cooch Behar
9. Rahima Khatun: Married detective Muhammad Shamsuddin

=== Khan Majumdars of Fulgazi ===
- Murad Khan: Middle Eastern merchant who arrived to Chittagong in the 17th century, but later moved to Sreepur in Fulgazi due to devastating floods in Chittagong He had four sons: Nahar Muhammad Khan, Tahir Muhammad Khan, Phul Muhammad Khan and Arif Muhammad Khan.
1. Phul Muhammad Khan (son of Murad Khan): He fought under Shamsher Ghazi against the Twipra Kingdom, and gained the title of Ghazi. The area came to be known as Phulgazi, or Fulgazi, after him.
2. Nahar Muhammad Khan (son of Murad Khan): responsible for building a large reservoir in his palace in 1701, To the west of this reservoir, the family built a three-domed mosque which is now known as the Sripur Jami Mosque and continues to be used today. The Maharaja of Tripura signed a peace treaty with Shamsher Gazi and his forces which included Nahar and Phulgazi. The treaty mentioned that Nahar received 80 droṇ of revenue-free land, 14 zamindari mouzas and the title of Majumdar. These 14 mouzas make up the modern-day Fulgazi Upazila
3. Azgar Ali Majumdar (eldest of the five sons of Nahar Muhammad Khan): had five sons named Aqamat Ali Majumdar, Hashmat Ali Majumdar, Bashrat Ali Majumdar, Salamat Ali Majumdar and Mafizul Islam Majumdar
  - Aqamat Ali Majumdar (son of Azgar Ali Majumdar): had no sons
  - Basharat Ali Majumdar (son of Azgar Ali Majumdar): was a father of two
  - Hashmat Ali Majumdar (son of Azgar Ali Majumdar): son:
    - Mazharul Husayn Majumder (son of Hashmat Ali Majumdar): He was also known as Muzzammil Ali Majumdar and became a Sufi pir by the sobriquet of Pir Pagla Dervish (died November 1975)
  - Mafizul Ali Majumdar (son of Azgar Ali Majumdar): He died before marriage
  - Salamat Ali Majumdar (son of Azgar Ali Majumdar): He had five sons; most notably Iskandar Majumdar, Mokaddes Hossain Majumder and Zamshed Hossain Majumdar
    - Eskander Majumder (son of Salamat Ali Majumdar): tea-businessman who married Begum Taiyaba and migrated to Dinajpur. He had three daughters and two sons.
      - Selima Islam: She married M. Rafiqul Islam, was the former vice-chancellor of Islamic University, Bangladesh, professor of economics at the University of Rajshahi and treasurer of Pundra University of Science and Technology
        - Shahrin Islam Tuhin, was a former member of Parliament (1996) and son of Selima Islam and M. Rafiqul Islam.
        - Saiful Islam Duke retired Lieutenant Commander of Bangladesh Navy and son of Selima Islam and M. Rafiqul Islam.
      - Khurshid Jahan (1939–2006), former Minister of Women and Children Affairs (2001–2006)
      - Khaleda Khanam Putul (see below)
      - Sayeed Eskander Majumdar (1953–2012), former parliamentarian (2001–2006) and founding chairman of Islamic TV
      - Shamim Eskander Majumdar, politician

2. Zamshed Hossain Majumdar (son of Salamat Ali Majumdar), was a prominent businessman, Social and political leader in Feni District, had six sons and four daughters

1. Zakir Hossain Majumdar Chaad, martyr in 1971 war
2. Zahid Hossain Majumdar Nonaai, businessman and politician
3. Zohirul Quium Majumdar Nantu, Government job holder and founding chairman of Islamic TV. had two sons and a daughter
4. Late Mainuddin Majumder Mamun, Businessman, Had One son (Late Tanjil Hossain Majumder) & One Daughter (Mahmuda Mahonaz Taha)

== Members of the Majumder-Zia family ==
- Ziaur Rahman (President of Bangladesh, 1979–1981; freedom fighter and military administrator)
- Begum Khaleda Zia (wife of Ziaur Rahman; Prime Minister of Bangladesh, 1991–1996 and 2001–2006), daughter of Taiyaba Majumder and Iskandar Majumder
  - Tarique Rahman (born 1965): eldest son of Ziaur Rahman and Khaleda Zia, who is the current Prime Minister of Bangladesh and chairman of the Bangladesh Nationalist Party.
  - Dr. Zubaida Rahman: wife of Tarique Rahman and daughter of navy chief Mahbub Ali Khan and Syeda Iqbal Mand Banu
    - Zaima Rahman: only daughter of Tarique Rahman and Dr. Zubaida Rahman
  - Arafat Rahman (1969–2015): youngest son of Ziaur Rahman and Khaleda Zia and Former Chairman of the Development Committee of Bangladesh Cricket Board
  - Sharmila Rahman Sithi: wife of Arafat Rahman
    - Zahia Rahman: eldest daughter of Arafat Rahman and Syeda Sharmila Sithi
    - Zaifa Rahman: youngest daughter of Arafat Rahman and Syeda Sharmila Sithi.

== Family tree ==
=== Family of Mandals of Mahishaban ===
Muminuddin Mandal
Kakar Mandal
Kamaluddin Mandal
Mazhabuddin Mandal	Mahmud Mandal	Mansur Rahman Mandal	Jahanara Khatun	Zahiruddin Mandal	Moazzam Hossain Mandal
Mizanur Rahman Mandal	Rezaur Rahman Mandal	Ziaur Rahman	Khaleda Zia	Ahmad Kamal Mandal	Khalilur Rahman Mandal
Tarique Rahman	Zubaida Rahman	Sharmila Sithi	Arafat Rahman
Zaima Rahman	Zahia Rahman	Zaifa Rahman

=== Family of Khan Majumdars of Fulgazi ===
Murad Khan
Nahar Muhammad Khan	Phul Muhammad Khan
Azgar Ali Majumdar
Aqamat Ali Majumder	Salamat Ali Majumdar	Hashmat Ali Majumdar	Mafizul Ali Majumdar
Zamshed Hossain Majumdar	Eskander Majumder	Taiyaba Majumder
Selima Islam	M. Rafiqul Islam	Khurshid Jahan	Khaleda Zia	Ziaur Rahman	Sayeed Eskander	Nasrin Eskander	Shamim Eskander	Kaniz Fatima
Shahrin Islam Tuhin	Saiful Islam Duke	Shahriar Haque Don	Tarique Rahman	Arafat Rahman	Shams Eskander	Shafin Eskander	Ovik Eskander	Fasbeer Eskander	Orin Eskander	Ananya Eskander

== See also ==
- Sheikh family
- List of political families
