= Arafat Rahman =

Bangladeshi cricket executive (1969 – 2015)

- আরাফাত রহমান

Chairman of the Development Committee, Bangladesh Cricket Board
- In office 2002–2005
- President: Mohammad Ali Asghar Lobby

Personal details
- Born: 12 August 1969 Chittagong, East Pakistan, Pakistan (Now:Bangladesh)
- Died: 24 January 2015 (aged 45) Kuala Lumpur, Malaysia
- Resting place: Banani Graveyard, Dhaka
- Spouse: Sharmila Rahman Sithi
- Relations: Tarique Rahman (brother); Zubaida Khan (Sister-in-law)
- Children: 2
- Parents: Ziaur Rahman (father); Khaleda Zia (mother)
- Relatives: See Majumder–Zia family
- Nickname: Koko

Arafat Rahman, nicknamed "Koko" (12 August 1969 – 24 January 2015) was a Bangladeshi cricket organizer and former chairman of the Development Committee of the Bangladesh Cricket Board. He was the younger son of former president of Bangladesh Ziaur Rahman and former prime minister of Bangladesh Khaleda Zia. His elder brother is Tarique Rahman, the current chairman of the BNP and the Prime Minister of Bangladesh.

Rahman is widely remembered for his contributions to cricket in Bangladesh as the chairman of the Development Committee of the Bangladesh Cricket Board from 2002 to 2005. He played a significant role in designing a development programme for the Bangladesh Cricket Board, initiating the High-Performance Squad that worked to train young cricketers and sought to ensure a pipeline of talent for the national cricket team over the following decade.

Rahman came to face significant legal trouble in his later life, as he was exiled by the caretaker government of 2007–08 and faced a six-year jail sentence for an alleged money laundering case. Rahman would later flee Bangladesh to avoid further imprisonment until his death.

On 24 January 2015, Rahman died due to cardiac arrest while at the University of Malaya Medical Centre (UMMC) in Kuala Lumpur, Malaysia.

== Early life and family ==
Arafat Rahman was born on 12 August 1969 in Combined Military Hospital, Chittagong at Chittagong Cantonment of then East Pakistan, Pakistan (now in Chittagong Division, Bangladesh) to a Bengali Muslim family of Mandals hailing from Gabtali in Rajshahi Division. His paternal grandfather Mansur Rahman, was a chemist and an administrative officer who worked with the British Indian Government at the Writers' Building of Calcutta. His father, Major Ziaur Rahman who was serving as second in command of 8th East Bengal Regiment in Pakistan Army at the time of his birth became the seventh president of Bangladesh in 1977 and his mother, Khaleda Zia, was the tenth and first female prime minister of the country. Arafat was eleven years old when his father was assassinated in 1981.

He started his education at BAF Shaheen School. After the death of his father Ziaur Rahman, his mother Begum Khaleda Zia joined politics and took the lead of the nationalist party. After being sent by his mother to his uncle in the United Kingdom, Arafat completed his O level there. From there, he went to America and completed his A level. He then pursued higher education in civil aviation from Australia.

Rahman was married to Sharmila Rahman Sithi, and had two children with her. His elder brother is Tarique Rahman, who serves as the Prime Minister of Bangladesh since February 2026 and chairman of the Bangladesh Nationalist Party.

== Career ==
Arafat Rahman was enthusiastic about sports, especially cricket. During his studies in Australia, he built a network with local Australian cricket coaching staff in the early 1990s, which he utilized to shape Bangladesh's cricket as the chairman of the Development Committee of the Bangladesh Cricket Board (BCB) from 2002 to 2005.

Rahman was one of the pioneers of developing a High-Performance unit at BCB to develop emerging cricketers in an academy setting. This initiative helped develop Mohammad Ashraful, Aftab Ahmed, Shahriar Nafees, Mashrafe Mortaza, Shakib Al Hasan, Mushfiqur Rahim and many others who later became an influential part of the Bangladeshi cricket team. He brought in Richard McInnes to lead the initiative. This initiative was eventually converted into the National Cricket Academy.

He is particularly credited for renovating Sher-e-Bangla National Cricket Stadium, which was originally built as a football and athletics stadium, and converting the stadium into the home of Bangladesh cricket. Despite criticism and allegations of corruption, Arafat Rahman led the renovation process of the stadium. From 2004 to 2006, about three feet of soil was excavated to remove all the red clay. Water pipes were fit in to develop a drainage facility, and afterwards the ground was filled up with rock chips, sand, and grass. The gallery was replaced by new chairs and shades as well.

In his short stint with BCB, Arafat Rahman contributed to the development of six international cricket venues across the country, in Dhaka, Chattagram, Narayanganj, Sylhet, Khulna and Bogra, all of whom received international status from 2006 to 2007.

Arafat Rahman also invited prominent Bangladeshi businessmen such as Khondokar Jamil Uddin, Aziz Al Kaiser, Reaz Uddin Al-Mamoon, and others to invest in cricket clubs. This was to pump in corporate financial support for the emerging cricketers. Remembering his conversation with Arafat Rahman, Khondokar Jamil Uddin said,

I was a simple businessman. It is Arafat Rahman Koko who brought me into the cricket arena. He said, 'Jamil vai, being a businessman you have a responsibility to contribute to the nation.'

Rahman was also the chairman of Old DOHS Sports Club and helped in the development of a new sports club, City Club.

== Controversies ==
In November 2007, Rahman was jailed on charges of money laundering. While his lawyer claimed these transactions were fabricated, and the funds in question were to have been transferred by a Singaporean businessman with no obvious ties to Rahman. However, In January 2009, the U.S. Department of Justice filed a civil forfeiture action seeking to recover 3 million USD held in Singaporean bank accounts, stating that the funds were processed of bribe paid to Arafat Rahman Koko. DOJ also alleged that the payments passed through U.S. finanacial institutions before being transferred to Singapore, bringing the transactions under U.S. jurisdiction.

== Exile ==
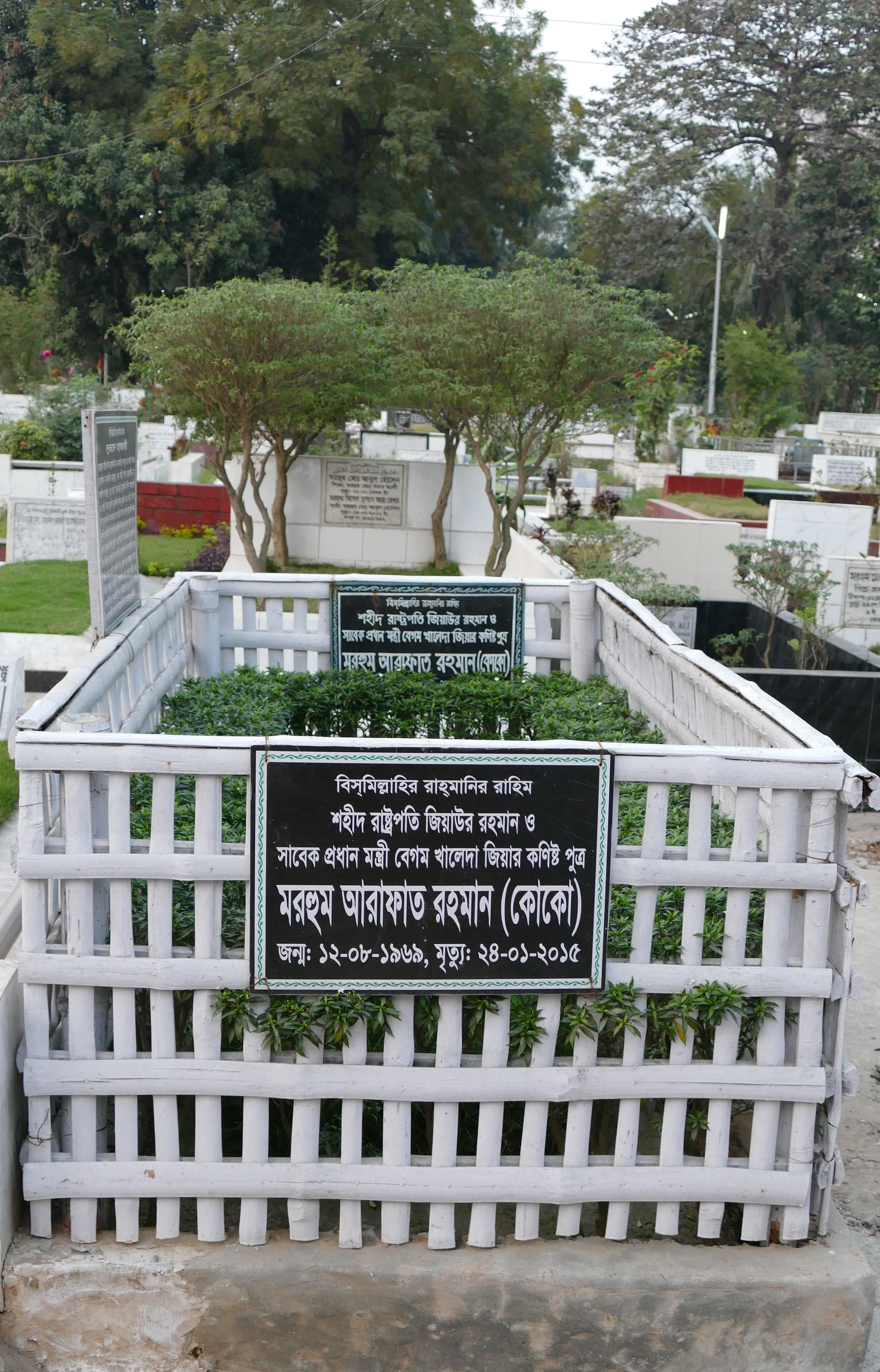
Arafat Rahman's grave, at Banani Graveyard in Dhaka.

After the military-backed takeover of power by a technocrat government led by Fakhruddin Ahmed, Arafat Rahman's business office and house were raided by joint forces on multiple occasions.

In April 2007, he was picked up from his home to pressure his mother and the former prime minister Begum Khaleda Zia to leave Bangladesh as a part of the "Minus Two Formula". He was later released and was dropped at home after his mother was said to have agreed to leave the country with her sons. In June, however, she decided instead to stay in Bangladesh and face the consequences. Cases soon started being filed against Arafat and his mother. By August 2007, all of their bank accounts were frozen and by early September, Arafat and his mother Begum Khaleda Zia were sued and arrested.

On 17 July 2008, after receiving permission from the Bangladesh Supreme Court, Rahman went to Thailand and later to Malaysia for medical treatment. He was still to be jailed for six years, and a Dhaka court issued a warrant for his arrest in November 2010. Following this, he moved to Malaysia from Thailand and never returned to Bangladesh.

== Death ==
He died of cardiac arrest on 24 January 2015, at the University of Malaya Medical Centre (UMMC) in Kuala Lumpur, Malaysia. He was buried at Banani Graveyard in Bangladesh on 27 January 2015, after a grand funeral which was attended by thousands of mourners in Dhaka.
