= Bangladesh Nationalist Front =

Political party in Bangladesh

Bangladesh Nationalist Front বাংলাদেশ জাতীয়তাবাদী ফ্রন্ট
- Abbreviation: BNF
- President: S.M. Abul Kalam Azad
- Founder: Nazmul Huda
- Founded: 2012; 14 years ago
- Split from: Bangladesh Nationalist Party
- Headquarters: Dhaka
- Bangladesh Parliament: 0 / 350

Election symbol
- "Television"

Party flag
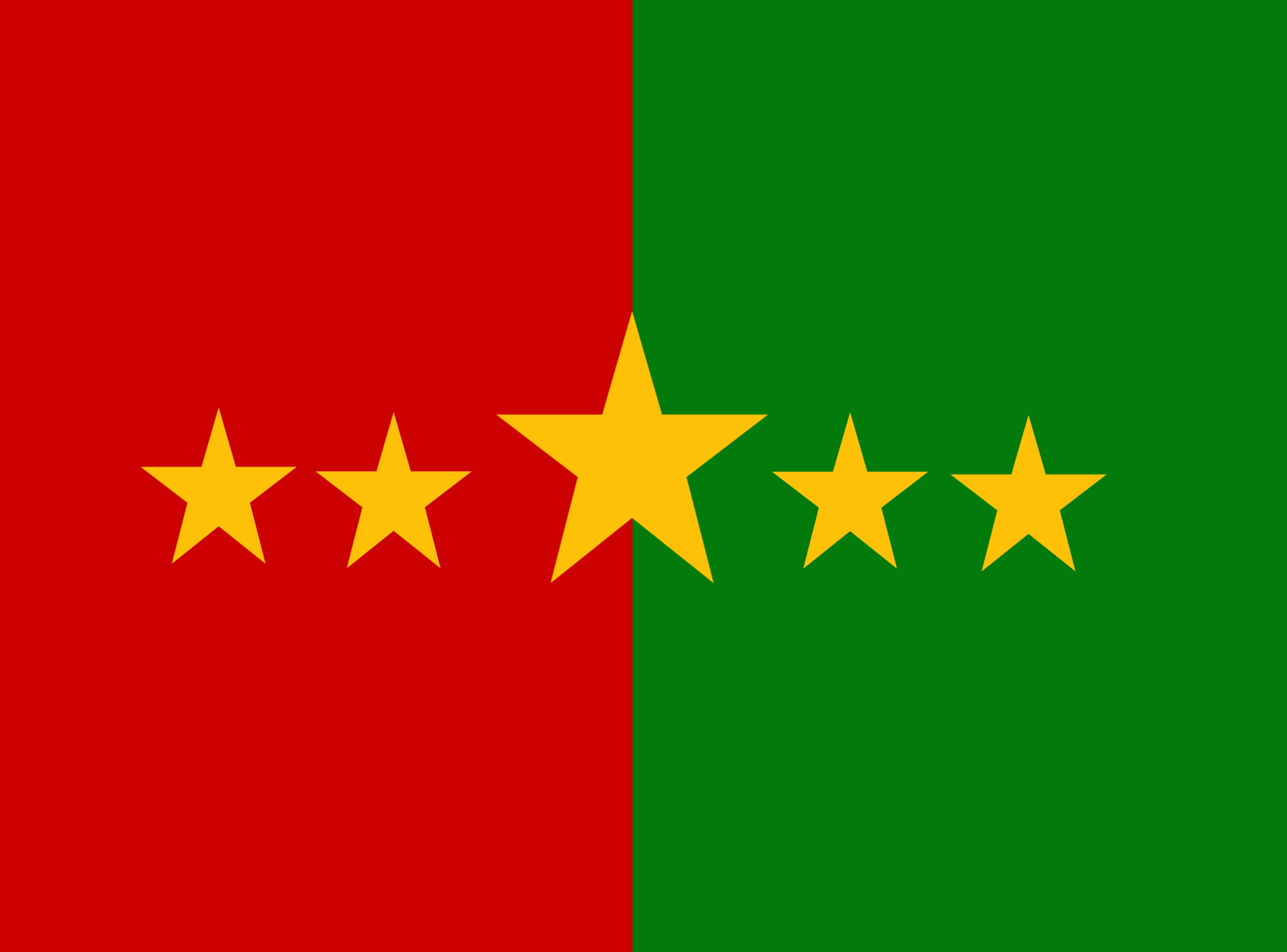

Bangladesh Nationalist Front is a political party in Bangladesh. Former member of parliament for Dhaka-17 Abul Kalam Azad is the party's chairman.

== History ==
Nazmul Huda founded the Bangladesh Nationalist Front in August 2012 after resigning from the Bangladesh Nationalist Party on 6 June 2012. Abul Kamal Azad, member-secretary, expelled Huda from the Bangladesh Nationalist Front. The Front was registered with the Bangladesh Election Commission in 2015. In 2015, during talks with President Mohmmad Abdul Hamid over the next election, the Bangladesh Nationalist Front proposed that the Election Commission Secretariat be scrapped.

== Election results ==
=== Jatiya Sangsad elections ===
Election	Party leader	Votes	%	Seats	+/–	Position	Government
2014	S.M. Abul Kalam Azad	107,990	0.63%	1 / 300	New	▲7th	Coalition
2018	S.M. Abul Kalam Azad	13,289	0.02%	0 / 300	▼1	▼21st	Extra-parliamentary
2024	S.M. Abul Kalam Azad	22,398	0.06%	0 / 300	Steady		Extra-parliamentary
