= 2023 Dhaka-17 by-election =

- 17 July 2023

Dhaka-17 Jatiya Sangsad constituency
- Registered: 325,205
- Turnout: 11.51% (▼54.3 pp)
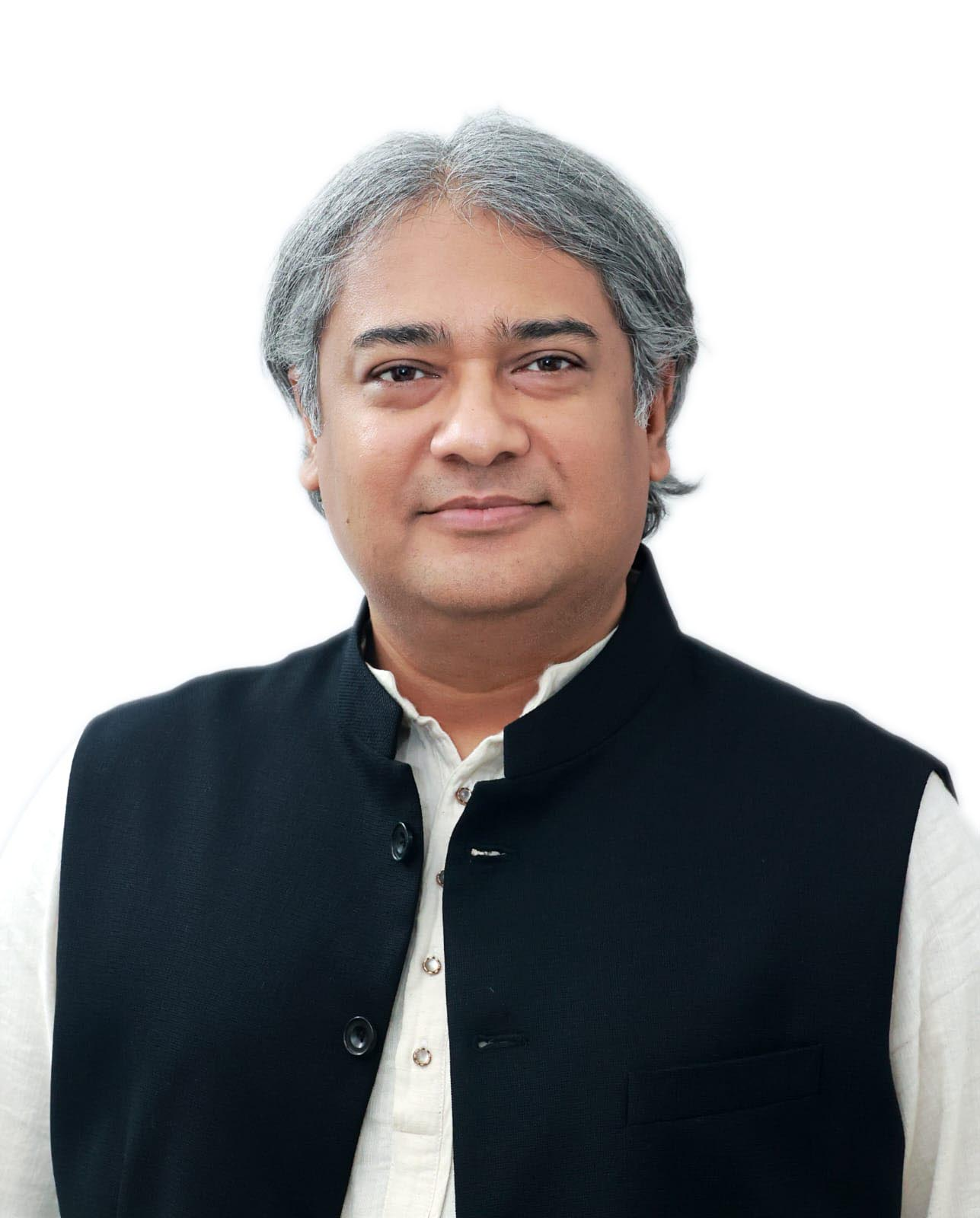

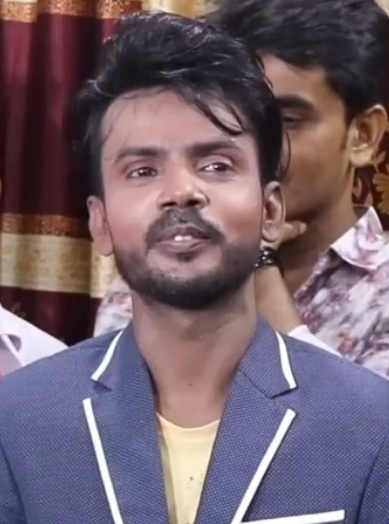
Candidate	Mohammad A. Arafat	Ashraful Alom
Party	AL	Independent
Popular vote	28,816	5,609
Percentage	77.8%	15.1%
- Dhaka-17 constituency within Dhaka District
MP before election
Akbar Hossain Pathan Farooque
AL
Elected MP
Mohammad A. Arafat
AL

A by-election for the Bangladesh parliamentary constituency of Dhaka-17 was held on 17 July 2023, following the death of incumbent member of Parliament Akbar Hossain Pathan Farooque. The Awami League nominated Mohammad A. Arafat, an academic and a political advocate of the Awami League, to replace Farooque; he won the by-election with more than 77 percent of the vote, a landslide majority.

This constituency consists of wards 15, 18, 19 and 20 of Dhaka North City Corporation and Dhaka Cantonment area. Total eligible voters were 325,205 in this election.

== Candidates ==
A total of 8 candidates were contested for the constituency.

Name	Election Symbol	Party	Ref.
Mohammad A. Arafat	Nouka (Boat)	Bangladesh Awami League	
Hero Alom	Ektara	Independent	
Sikder Anisur Rahman	Langol (Plough)	Jatiya Party (Ershad)	
Md Rashidul Hasan	Golap ful (Rose)	Zaker Party	
Sheikh Habibur Rahman	Sonali Aash (Golden fibre)	Grassroots BNP	
Rezaul Islam Swapan	Dab (Green Coconut)	Bangladesh Congress	
Mohammad Akhter Hossain	Chari	Bangladesh Sanskritik Muktijot	
Tarikul Islam Bhuiyan	Truck	Independent	

== Incidents ==
On July 17, 2023, Independent candidate Alom was assaulted by political opponents near a polling center at the Banani Bidyaniketan School and College. The incident occurred at around 3:20 p.m. while Alom was visiting the polling center. According to reports, Alom was taking photos with his fans on the playground of the school when he was approached by a group of people who told him that it was not a place to shoot TikTok videos. The group then began to physically assault Alom, dragging him out of the building after he had entered the corridor. Alom was able to escape in a car. An officer at the scene said that Alom had been accompanied by around 50-60 people, and that law enforcement personnel had ejected them from the polling center to maintain order. The officer also said that the assault on the independent candidate took place outside the polling center premises.

The officer added that the police would collect video footage of the incident and investigate. He said that those responsible for the assault would be brought to justice.

== Result of the by-election ==
Mohammad A. Arafat was elected as member of Parliament by defeating Independent candidate Hero Alom.

2023 Dhaka-17 by-election result
Party	Candidate	Votes	%	±%
AL	Mohammad A. Arafat	28,816	77.80	N/A
Independent	Ashraful Alom	5,609	15.14	N/A
JP(E)	Sikdar Anisur Rahman	1,328		N/A
Zaker Party	Md Rashidul Hasan	923		N/A
Grassroots BNP	Sheikh Habibur Rahman	202		N/A
Bangladesh Sankritik Muktijot	Md Akhtar Hossain	64		N/A
Independent	Md Tariqul Islam Bhuiyan	52		N/A
BCP	Rezaul Islam Swapan	43		N/A
Majority				
Turnout		37,037	11.51	
Registered electors		325,205		
AL hold				

== Reactions ==
=== International ===
The United Nations high commission of Bangladesh showed their concerns over the actions and requested for his protection.

== See also ==
- 2023 elections in Bangladesh
