= Mohammad Ali Arafat =

Bangladeshi politician (born 1973)

- মোহাম্মদ আলী আরাফাত
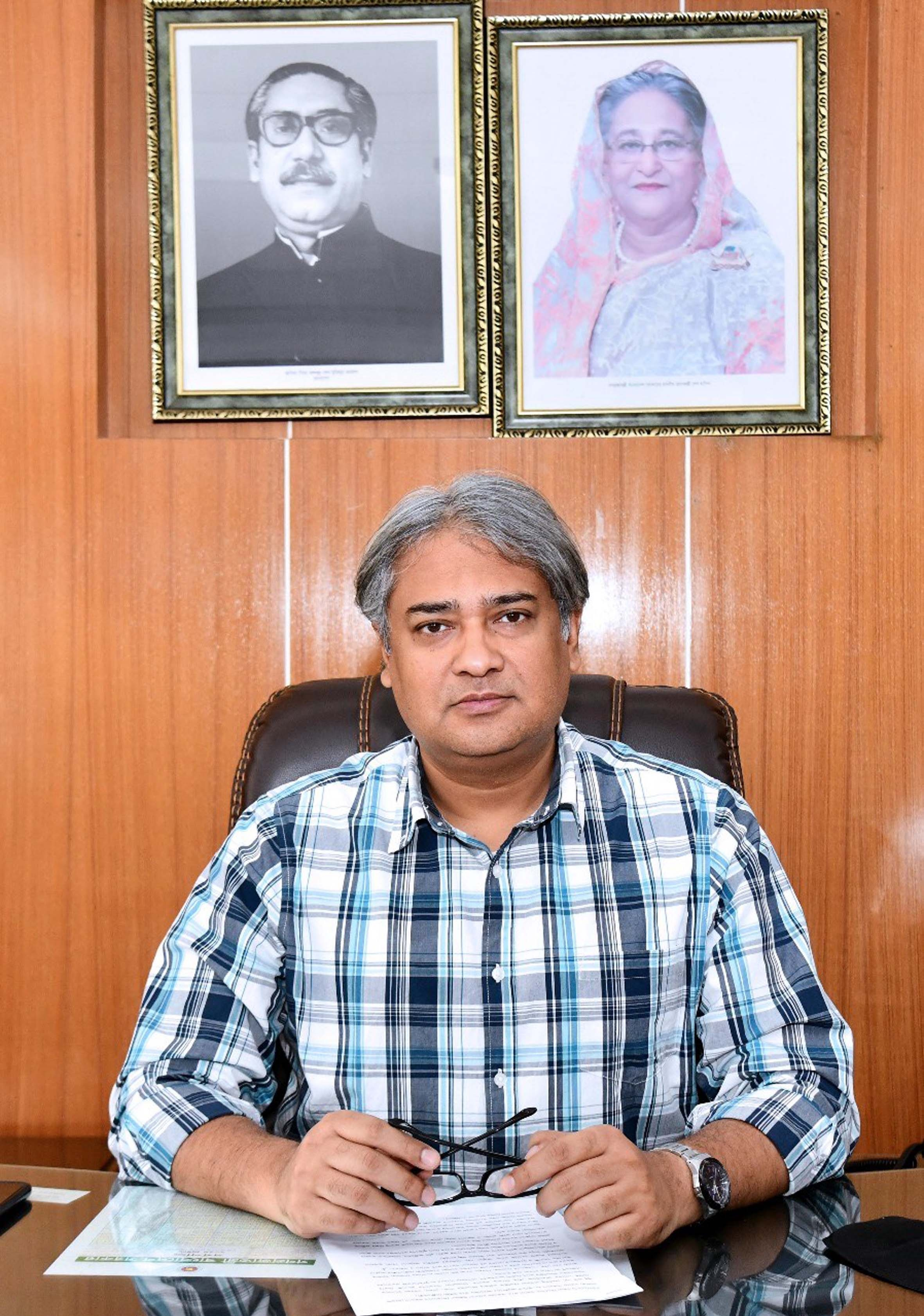
- Arafat in 2024.

Minister of State for Information and Broadcasting
- In office 11 January 2024 – 5 August 2024
- Prime Minister: Sheikh Hasina
- Preceded by: Murad Hasan
- Succeeded by: Nahid Islam (as adviser)

Member of Parliament
- In office 13 July 2023 – 5 August 2024
- Preceded by: Akbar Hossain Pathan Farooque
- Succeeded by: Tarique Rahman
- Constituency: Dhaka-17

Personal details
- Born: 2 May 1973 (age 53) Rajshahi, Bangladesh
- Party: Bangladesh Awami League
- Spouses: Sharmin Mustary (m. 2016); Shomi Kaiser (m. 2008; div. 2015)
- Education: Oklahoma State University; Prairie View A&M University

Mohammad Ali Arafat (born 2 May 1973) is a Bangladeshi politician and academic associated with Bangladesh Awami League. He served as the Minister of State for Ministry of Information and Broadcasting in the fifth Hasina Cabinet. He was a two-time member of the parliament representing Dhaka-17 constituency. He is also the founder and chairperson of Suchinta Foundataion, a non-profit think tank and research centre. Following the resignation of Sheikh Hasina on 5 August 2024, he left Bangladesh and has since been living in self imposed exile. In October 2024, International Crimes Tribunal of Bangladesh issued an arrest warrant against him over alleged crimes during the 2024 quota reform movement, and sought Interpol assistance for a possible Red Notice. However, he called the tribunal as a 'political show trial'.

During his tenure, Arafat defended his government's response to the 2024 Bangladesh Quota Reform Movement, attributing the unrest to the involvement of third-party actors, including extremists group, though a report by the OHCHR found evidence of brutal and systematic repression of the protests by his government. He threatened to shut down satellite TV channels broadcasting the news of clashes, labeling them as "Enemy of State."

== Career ==
Arafat was born on 2 May 1973 to Habibun Nisa and Mohammad Setab Uddin in Rajshahi.

Arafat is a syndicate member and chief advisor to the board of trustees of the Canadian University of Bangladesh. Studied from Texas A&M University at Prairie View and Oklahoma State University.M Arafat holds advanced business degrees from Texas A&M University at Prairie View and Oklahoma State University. He is the founder of Suchinta Foundation. He endorsed Annisul Huq for the North Dhaka mayoral election.

Arafat has called for stronger ties with India and allowing transshipment of goods.

Arafat called Reza Kibria, a son of former finance minister Shah A M S Kibria, a traitor for complaining about the human rights situation in Bangladesh to the United States. He criticized the United States for placing sanctions on the Rapid Action Battalion and described Gano Adhikar Parishad as a none threat to the Awami League government.

Arafat was made a member of the Central Working Committee of the Awami League in December 2022. In September 2022, the government of Bangladesh dismantled the existing trustee board of Manarat International University alleging it had links with Islamist militants and Bangladesh Jamaat-e-Islami. Mayor of North Dhaka and Awami League politician Atiqul Islam was appointed chairman and Arafat was appointed a member of the newly created trustee board.

Arafat is the chairman of the Dhaka-based nonprofit social-advocacy organisation, the Suchinta Foundation. The foundation has, among others, done extensive advocacy work in poverty eradication in Bangladesh through entrepreneurship development.

Arafat is a two-time member of the Jatiya Sangsad, elected from the Dhaka-17 constituency as an Awami League nominee in the 11th and 12th parliaments respectively in the space of 5 months and both times without any competition from major opposition parties. He is also a member of the Awami League's central working committee.

He acknowledged concerns over the shooting of Abu Sayed, describing it as possibly unlawful, and stated that an independent judicial committee had been formed to investigate the incident. He also affirmed his government's commitment to a transparent investigation into the violence during the quota reform movement.

== Controversy ==
=== Controversial statements ===
During the 2024 Bangladesh quota reform movement, Arafat said to journalists,

The terrorists of BNP-Jamaat are creating chaos on the streets and destroying state property. It has been proven that many of the students were on drugs, as if they were preparing to step forward in front of the police. You all know that previously, terrorist attacks have happened in various countries around the world. During 9/11, for example, in America, they too were on drugs.

His remark of calling the protesters "drugged" caused significant public outrage against him. Another such statement by him that caused public outrage against him during the 2024 Bangladesh quota reform movement was,

Even if rubber bullets are fired every second, it would take 5 years to finish.

=== Alo Ashbei ===
He was part of a WhatsApp group with figures from the entertainment industry, who actively opposed the student movement. This group was called "Alo Ashbei," and was led by actor Ferdous Ahmed. Following the non-cooperation movement, screenshots from this WhatsApp group were leaked on social media on September 3, 2024, revealing discussions that included inflammatory remarks against the protesters.

=== Media censorship ===
In July 2024, during the Bangladesh Quota Reform Movement, then State Minister for Information and Broadcasting Mohammad Ali Arafat instructed Bangladesh Satellite Company Ltd (BSCL) Chairman Dr. Shahjahan Mahmood to temporarily suspend the broadcast of four private TV channels—Desh TV, Channel 24, NTV, and Banglavision.

The directive came via WhatsApp. A screenshot reveals that on July 18 at 1:01 PM, Arafat messaged Mahmood: “Desh TV will go off the air from 13:10 PM for 10 minutes. Please confirm.” Mahmood replied “Yes.” Arafat later confirmed the signal was restored after 15 minutes, with viewers seeing either a mechanical error or a paused screen. Mahmood responded, “Perfect.”

Following these instructions, BSCL halted the broadcasts of the four channels for around 30 minutes. The move occurred amid growing nationwide protests over the government’s handling of the quota system. On July 17, the movement intensified after reports of student deaths, prompting the government to take repressive measures. The blackout is believed to have been aimed at suppressing media coverage of the unrest.

BSCL’s Sales and Marketing General Manager Shah Ahmedul Kabir confirmed the channels were taken offline but said his department had no role in the decision. He stated service disruptions are only allowed in case of contractual breaches, which did not apply here. He said the order came from higher authorities.

When asked, Mahmood said, "We follow orders from the state. I’m a technical person, not a politician." He acknowledged being under pressure and hinted that the original directive might have been for a longer blackout. "We compromised to protect everyone’s jobs", he added.

The blackout underscored the Awami League's willingness to weaponize state media infrastructure to silence opposition voices and manipulate public perception during a nationwide uprising.

=== Misinformation ===
Regarding the nationwide internet shutdown during the 2024 Bangladesh Quota Reform Movement, Arafat said, "Miscreants torched Data Centre to detach country". It was later found out in a probe report that the shutdown was government enforced and Arafat misled the nation by falsely linking the data centre fire to the internet shutdown.

=== Criminal allegations ===
After the 2024 non-cooperation movement and the fall of the Sheikh Hasina led Awami League government, the 12th Jatiya Sangsad was dissolved on 6 August 2024; Mohammad lost both his membership in the Jatiya Sangsad and his ministerial position. On 12 August, the Bangladesh Financial Intelligence Unit ordered all banks to freeze the accounts of Arafat and his wife, Sharmin Mustary.

The Anti-Corruption Commission found evidence of the former minister to have had a foreign citizenship during his time in office which is illegal for Member of Parliaments according to Article 66 of the Bangladesh Constitution.

He has been sued in a case concerning the death of Jagannath University student Ikramul Haque Sajid, who was shot during a protest in Dhaka's Mirpur-10 area. On 20 August 2024, a case was filed against Arafat in connection with the death of a vegetable seller during the protests, and the Bangladesh Financial Intelligence Unit subsequently requested banks to freeze Arafat's accounts amid ongoing investigations into his activities. Despite media reports of his arrest on August 27, 2024, the Dhaka Metropolitan Police later clarified that they had no information confirming his apprehension. The Dhaka Metropolitan Police couldn't find him after a raid in his Gulshan residence. 54 criminal cases have been lodged against him. Lawyer and human rights activist Sara Hossain expressed concern about the broader wave of lawsuits filed against former ministers and lawmakers following the Awami League's departure. Arafat also criticised the large-scale lawsuit filed against him, stating that “it is convenient to label the opposition as ‘fascist’ to justify suppressing them.”

Arafat has been named in a petition which seeks an investigation into genocide and crimes against humanity in the Bangladeshi International Crime Tribunal. The International Crimes Tribunal has issued an arrest warrant for him. On April 10, 2025, the Chief Prosecutor of the International Crimes Tribunal requested Interpol red notices for several accused, including Arafat, to assist with their arrest and possible extradition. In response to The Gurdian, he described the tribunal as a “political show trial,” adding that the Awami League “categorically rejects the politically motivated charges” against its leadership and urging the international community to view the tribunal as a tool to criminalise political opposition.

=== Election irregularities ===
Mohammad A. Arafat's electoral victories have faced scrutiny and criticism regarding alleged irregularities and the overall fairness of the election process.

During the July 2023 Dhaka-17 by-election, which Arafat won, controversy arose following an assault on independent candidate Ashraful Alom, popularly known as Hero Alom, on election day. This incident, along with a notably low voter turnout of 11.51%, led to questions about the conduct and legitimacy of the polling. Some political commentators and opposition figures pointed to the low participation and the attack on a rival as indicative of a flawed electoral environment.

Further criticism emerged in the context of the January 2024 general election. While Arafat secured a decisive victory in the Dhaka-17 constituency, the broader election was boycotted by the main opposition party, the Bangladesh Nationalist Party (BNP). International observers, including the United States Department of State, expressed concerns that the electoral process was not free or fair, citing issues such as voter intimidation and suppression. Reports from organizations like the National Democratic Institute (NDI) and the Asian Network for Free Elections (ANFREL) also highlighted significant irregularities and a lack of a genuinely competitive environment, which they argued undermined the credibility of the election, including in constituencies like Arafat's. These reports pointed to a climate of fear and restricted political space that impacted the overall democratic nature of the polls. Mohammad A. Arafat's electoral victories have faced scrutiny and allegations of irregularities.

Following the Dhaka-17 by-election on July 17, 2023, which Arafat won, his opponent Ashraful Hossen Alom (commonly known as Hero Alom) alleged instances of vote rigging and irregularities. Alom claimed that his polling agents were forcibly removed from 19 polling stations within an hour of the election starting and that he was physically assaulted when he went to observe the voting situation at Banani Bidyaniketan polling station. He subsequently filed a petition with the election commission demanding a re-election, stating he possessed video evidence of the alleged rigging, and requested the parliament speaker not to administer Arafat's oath as MP.

The 12th general election on January 7, 2024, in which Arafat was elected and subsequently appointed State Minister for Information and Broadcasting, was also subject to criticism regarding its fairness. Transparency International Bangladesh (TIB) published a report on the election, which Arafat, in his ministerial role, criticized as not adhering to international research standards and accused TIB of attempting to mislead the public with false information. General criticisms surrounding this election included accusations that the ruling Awami League fielded "dummy" candidates to create a veneer of competition and that state machinery was used to intimidate independent candidates and pressure citizens into voting. The United States State Department later commented that the January 2024 general election in Bangladesh was not free and fair. Reports from election day also detailed instances of journalists being attacked and obstructed while trying to cover alleged irregularities, including ballot stuffing by supporters of the Awami League.

In May 2025, a case was reportedly filed in Narayanganj District Judge Court against several individuals, including Mohammad A. Arafat and then-former Prime Minister Sheikh Hasina, accusing them of involvement in "voter-less national elections" and alleging that the last three general elections under Sheikh Hasina's administration were marred by irregularities, fraud, and manipulation.

Arafat, representing the Awami League, defended the 2024 elections, stating that holding them was a constitutional requirement and arguing that the Awami League had no motive to rig the polls, particularly given the main opposition's boycott. He acknowledged that the election might not appear complete without the participation of the Bangladesh Nationalist Party (BNP). He also attributed lower official voter turnout figures to factors such as voters residing overseas or migrating internally without updating their electoral information.

== Personal life ==
Arafat married Shomi Kaiser, actress and daughter of Shahidullah Kaiser and Panna Kaiser, on 24 July 2008. They divorced in 2015. He later married Sharmin Mustary.
