= Suchinta Foundation =

Bangladeshi non-profit think tank and research centre

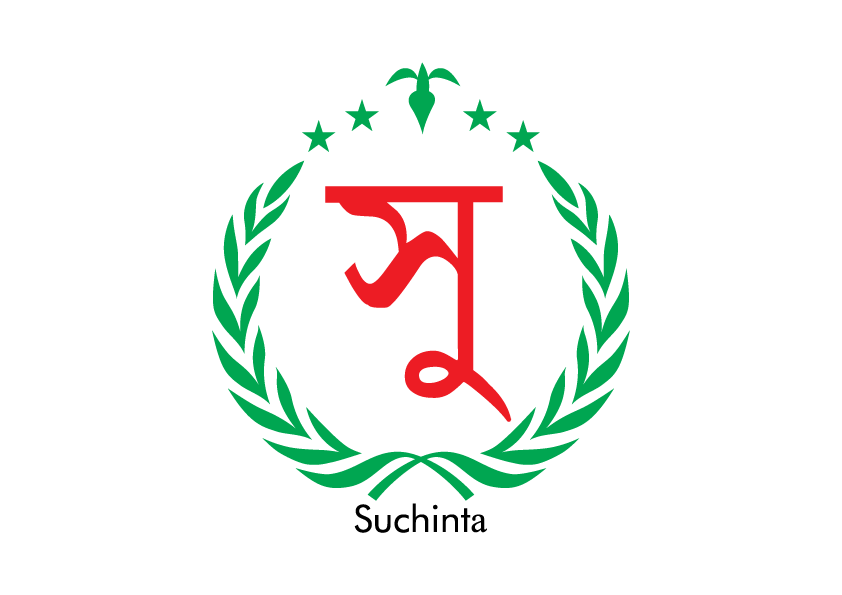
- Headquarters: Dhaka, Bangladesh
- Region served: Bangladesh
- Official language: Bengali
- Chairperson: Mohammad Ali Arafat
- Affiliations: Awami League
- Website: suchintafoundation.org

The Suchinta Foundation (Bengali: সুচিন্তা ফাউন্ডেশন) is a Bangladeshi non-profit think tank and research centre. Mohammad Ali Arafat is the chairperson of the foundation. Arafat is an academic and a former Minister of State for Ministry of Information and Broadcasting. He was a teacher of management at the Canadian University of Bangladesh.

== History ==
On 14 September 2013, Suchinta foundation organized a seminar titled Vision 2021: Achievements of the past five years and pledges for the next five years at the Bangabandhu International Conference Centre. Sajeeb Wazed Joy, son of former Prime Minister Sheikh Hasina, spoke at the event.

Suchinta Foundation organized a discussion at Radisson Blu Dhaka where Sajeeb Wazed Joy questioned the "freedom fighter" status of former President Ziaur Rahman.

On 6 February 2015, Suchinta Foundation organized a discussion on terrorism vs politics at Lakeshore Hotel.

Suchinta Foundation organized a photo exhibition on Sheikh Mujibur Rahman at the Teacher Student Centre of the University of Dhaka on 14 August 2016. On 19 October 2016, Suchinta Foundation organized an event in Dhaka in collaboration with Access to information in Bangladesh, Bangladesh Association of Software and Information Services, Bangladesh Computer Council, Centre for Research and Information, Information and Communication Technology Division, and Young Bangla. At the event Sajeeb Wazed Joy was recognized as the "architect of Digital Bangladesh".

Suchinta Foundation has three board members Aroma Dutta, Tanya Bukth, and Qantara Khaleda Khan. Mohammad A Arafat, chairperson of Suchinta Foundation, is an advisor to the trustee board of Canadian University of Bangladesh.

Suchinta Foundation organized a seminar titled "Experience of Padma Bridge: Truth and Falsehood in Politics" at a hotel in Dhaka. Sajeeb Wazed Joy blamed Mohammad Yunus for creating a divide between Bangladesh and the United States on 23 October 2017.

Suchinta Foundation jointly organized a seminar with Prime University on 28 August 2018. On 11 October 2018, Suchinta Foundation organised a seminar titled Jago Tarunno Rukho Jongibad with ASA University Bangladesh. On 27 October 2018, Suchinta Foundation organized a seminar titled '21 August: Present-Future of Bangladesh's Politics' where Sajeeb Wazed Joy was the chief guest.

Suchinta Foundation organised a seminar, titled Wake up Youth, Stop Militancy, on Royal University of Dhaka on 21 January 2019. On 6 August 2019, Suchinta Foundation organised a seminar titled Jagu Taronno, Rukho Santras with Primeasia University.

On 3 February 2020, Mohammad A Arafat, chairperson of Suchinta Foundation, was part of a delegation of the Awami League who briefed foreign diplomats about the upcoming Dhaka North City Corporation and Dhaka South City Corporation elections. The delegation included Hossain Toufique Imam, political affairs advisor to Prime Minister Sheikh Hasina, Shammi Ahmed, international affairs secretary of Awami League, and Muhammad Zamir, former ambassador of Bangladesh. In January 2024, he was appointed Minister of State for Ministry of Information and Broadcasting.

Bangladesh Police detained Zeenat Sohana Chowdhury, a leader of the Chittagong Division unit of Suchinta Foundation in May 2025.
