= S.M. Abul Kalam Azad (politician) =

Bangladeshi politician

Member of Parliament
- In office 9 January 2014 – 7 January 2019
- Preceded by: Hussain Muhammad Ershad
- Succeeded by: Akbar Hossain Pathan Farooque
- Constituency: Dhaka-17

Personal details
- Born: 1 November 1954 (age 70); Chittagong, East Pakistan
- Political party: Bangladesh Nationalist Front

S.M. Abul Kalam Azad (born 1 November 1954) is a Bangladesh Nationalist Front politician and a former Member of Parliament from Dhaka-17.

== Early life ==
Azad was born in 1954. He has completed M.S.S. in political science.

== Career ==
Azad was elected to Parliament from Dhaka-17 in 2014 as a Bangladesh Nationalist Front candidate. His constituency, Dhaka-17, had the lowest voter turnout in the 2014 elections at 6.4 percent. He is the coordinator of Bangladesh Nationalist Front.
