= Dhaka-17 =

Constituency of Bangladesh's Jatiya Sangsad

Coordinates: 23.80°N 90.41°E

- Constituency for the Jatiya Sangsad
- District: Dhaka District
- Division: Dhaka Division
- Electorate: 333,777 (2026)

Current constituency
- Created: 1973 (Original); 2008 (Redistricted)
- Party: Bangladesh Nationalist Party
- Member: Tarique Rahman
- ← 189 Dhaka-16 191 Dhaka-18 →

Dhaka-17 is a constituency represented in the Jatiya Sangsad (National Parliament) of Bangladesh since 2026 by Tarique Rahman of the Bangladesh Nationalist Party. Seat of Incumbent Prime Minister.

== Boundaries ==
The constituency encompasses Dhaka Cantonment and Dhaka North City Corporation wards 15 and 18 through 20.

== History ==
The constituency was created when, ahead of the 2008 general election, the Election Commission redrew constituency boundaries to reflect population changes revealed by the 2001 Bangladesh census. The 2008 redistricting added 7 new seats to the Dhaka metropolitan area, increasing the number of constituencies in the capital from 8 to 15.

== Members of Parliament ==
Election	Member	Party
1973	Kazi Mozammel Haque	Bangladesh Awami League
1979	Abdur Rauf	Bangladesh Nationalist Party
Major Boundary Changes
2008	Hussain Muhammad Ershad	Jatiya Party (Ershad)
2014	SM Abul Kalam Azad	Bangladesh Nationalist Front
2018	Akbar Hossain Pathan Farooque	Bangladesh Awami League
2023 by-election	Mohammad Ali Arafat	Bangladesh Awami League
2024	Mohammad Ali Arafat	Bangladesh Awami League
2026	Tarique Rahman	Bangladesh Nationalist Party

== Elections ==
=== Elections in the 2020s ===
General election 2026: Dhaka-17
Party	Candidate	Votes	%	±%
BNP	Tarique Rahman	72,699	50.53	+20.09
Jamaat	S. M. Khaliduzzaman	68,300	47.46	New
IAB	Mohammad Ullah	1,768	1.23	−0.06
JP(E)	Atiq Ahmed	1,168	0.81	−2.78
Majority		4,399	3.06	−59.60
Turnout		147,888	44.31	+32.80
Registered electors		333,777		
BNP gain from AL				

=== Election in the 2010s ===
General Election 2018: Dhaka-17
Party	Candidate	Votes	%	±%
AL	Akbar Hossain Pathan Farooque	164,610	79.80	+79.80
BJP	Andaleeve Rahman	38,639	18.72	−11.68
IAB	Md Aminul Haque Talukdar	2,665	1.29	+0.39
JP(E)	Hussain Muhammad Ershad	480	0.23	−66.67
Majority		125,971	61.03	+24.53
Turnout		206,394	65.80	−4.90
Registered electors		313,875		
AL gain from BNF				

General Election 2014: Dhaka-17
Party	Candidate	Votes	%	±%
BNF	SM Abul Kalam Azad	43,585	62.6	N/A
Jatiya Party (M)	Abdul Latif Mallik	22,046	31.6	N/A
Independent	MA Hannan Mridha	4,046	5.8	N/A
Majority		21,539	30.9	−5.6
Turnout		69,677	24.0	−46.7
BNF gain from JP(E)				

=== Elections in the 2000s ===
General Election 2008: Dhaka-17
Party	Candidate	Votes	%	±%
JP(E)	Hussain Muhammad Ershad	123,936	66.9	N/A
BNP	Hannan Shah	56,267	30.4	−24.6
Majority		67,669	36.5	N/A
Turnout		185,258	70.7	N/A
JP(E) win (new seat)				
