= Mahbub Ali Khan =

Bangladeshi politician

- মাহবুব আলী খান
- Official portrait

3rd Chief of Naval Staff
- In office 4 November 1979 – 6 August 1984
- President: Ziaur Rahman; Abdus Sattar; A. F. M. Ahsanuddin Chowdhury; Hussain Muhammad Ershad
- Prime Minister: Shah Azizur Rahman; Ataur Rahman Khan
- Preceded by: Musharaf Husain Khan
- Succeeded by: Sultan Ahmed

Personal details
- Born: 3 November 1934 Jalalpur, Assam, British India (present day Sylhet, Bangladesh
- Died: 6 August 1984 (aged 49) Dhaka, Bangladesh
- Spouse: Syeda Iqbal Mand Banu
- Children: Shahina Khan Zaman (Eldest Daughter) Dr. Zubaida Rahman (Youngest Daughter)
- Relatives: M. A. G. Osmani (cousin); Ajmal Ali Choudhury (cousin); Irene Khan (niece); Tarique Rahman (son-in-law); Zaima Rahman (granddaughter)

Military service
- Allegiance: Pakistan (before 1971); Bangladesh
- Branch/service: Pakistan Navy; Bangladesh Navy
- Years of service: 1952 - 1984
- Rank: Rear Admiral
- Commands: Commodore, BNS Umar Farooq; Commander, Khulna Naval Area (COMKHUL); Assistant Chief of Naval Staff (Operations); Assistant Chief of Naval Staff (Personnel); Chief of Naval Staff
- Battles/wars: Indo-Pakistani War of 1965

Mahbub Ali Khan (Bengali: মাহবুব আলী খান; 3 November 1934 – 6 August 1984) was a Bangladesh Navy rear admiral and the chief of naval staff from 1979 until his death in 1984. He is known for his heroic actions for his country. Under him, the South Talpatti sandbar and other emerging islands in the Bay of Bengal, over which both India and Bangladesh claimed sovereignty, remained under the authority of Bangladesh. He is also known for reducing piracy in the Bay of Bengal and was responsible for maintaining the security of the Bay and the Sundarbans.

== Early life and family ==
Khan was born into a wealthy Bengali Muslim zamindar family on 3 November 1934 in Jalalpur, Sylhet District (present-day Bangladesh) located in the British Raj's Assam Province. He was the youngest child among the three children of Ahmed Ali Khan and Jubaida Khatun. Khatun was the daughter of Khan Bahadur Wasiuddin Ahmad. In 1901, Ahmad Ali Khan became the first Muslim barrister in Sylhet. Ahmad Ali Khan was also the president of the Assam Congress and represented the All-India Muslim League party as a member of the Legislative Assembly.

Khan's grandfather, Khan Bahadur Asaddar Ali Khan (1850–1937) was Sylhet's first Muslim civil surgeon and the son-in-law of Syed Ameer Ali. A graduate of Aliah University, he was also the personal physician to the Bihari Shia lawyer-politician Syed Hasan Imam, the top barrister of the Calcutta High Court and leader of the Indian National Congress. His grand-uncle, Ghazanfar Ali Khan OBE ICS, was the first Muslim Cambridge graduate from Assam and Bengal. He was also the cousin of General M. A. G. Osmani, the supreme commander of Bangladesh Forces during the Bangladesh Liberation War, and Ajmal Ali Choudhury, a member of the National Assembly of Pakistan.

Khan spent most of his childhood in Sylhet District and the West Bengali city of Kolkata. After the formation of Pakistan, his family moved to Dhaka, the East Bengali city that had now become the new capital of the eastern wing of Pakistan. He received his primary education in Kolkata and Dhaka and pursued higher studies at Dhaka College. Later, he acquired a law degree. His niece is the Harvard-educated Irene Khan, a former head of Amnesty International.

== Career ==
For higher naval training, Khan went to finish his graduation at Britannia Royal Naval College in Dartmouth, England. In 1952, Khan joined the executive branch of the Pakistan Navy as a cadet. He received his training in a military school in Quetta, West Pakistan. For higher training, he went to finish his graduation at Britannia Royal Naval College in Dartmouth, England. After his graduation, he married Sayeeda Iqbal Manda Banu in 1955. They had two daughters, Shahina Khan and Zubaida Khan. On 1 May 1956, he received his standing commission. In 1960, he became the gunnery officer of PNS (Pakistani Naval Ship) Tughril. In 1963, Queen Elizabeth II awarded him for being a disciplined officer. In 1964, he became the torpedo and anti-submarine officer of PNS Tippu Sultan. From 1967 to 1968, he served the Pakistan Navy as the Joint Chiefs' Secretariat staff officer in the Defence Ministry in Rawalpindi. In 1970, he became the officer in charge of the torpedo and anti-submarine school in the PNS Himalaya, and in Karachi, he was the seaward defence officer.

During the Bangladesh Liberation War in 1971, when East Pakistan seceded to become Bangladesh and went to war with West Pakistan for independence, Khan was still in West Pakistan. As a Bengali, his allegiance was questioned by the Pakistani government, so he and his family were kept under house arrest. After the war, with Bangladesh's victory in December 1971, he was kept under house arrest in Pakistan for a further two years until, in 1973, he managed to escape to Afghanistan, from where he went to India before finally returning to Bangladesh.

Khan was the first Bengali to be appointed the commandant of the Mercantile Academy of Chittagong in October 1973. Under the presidency of Ziaur Rahman, Khan became the assistant chief of naval staff (operations and personnel) of the Bangladesh Navy in February 1976. As operating commander, in December 1976, Khan oversaw the Royal Navy of the United Kingdom, which sold a Salisbury-class frigate to Bangladesh, which came to be known as BNS Umar Farooq. The ship arrived in Bangladesh on 27 March 1977. Khan became the chief of naval staff of the Bangladesh Navy on 4 November 1979. He was promoted to the rank of rear admiral on 1 January 1980 .

In the aftermath of the Bhola cyclone in 1970, a small uninhabited offshore sandbar landform called the South Talpatti sandbar emerged in the Bay of Bengal. Although it was uninhabited and there were no permanent settlements or stations located in the sandbar, both India and Bangladesh claimed sovereignty because of speculation over the existence of oil and natural gas in the region. Under Khan, the sandbar remained under Bangladeshi authority. The Bangladesh Navy, under Khan, was also able to bring down many pirates who were operating in the Bay of Bengal. He also took measures to maintain the security of the Sundarbans.

During the presidency of Rahman, besides being the head of the navy, Khan was the minister of telecommunications. He was also a member of Zia's temporarily formed political party called JaGoDal. After reintroducing a multi-party democratic system in the country, Zia retired from the army and stepped down as the chief of army staff in April 1978 with the rank of lieutenant general. In September 1978, President Zia founded a new political party known as the Bangladesh Nationalist Party. After winning the 1979 general election and democratically legitimizing his position as president, Zia lifted the martial law that had been in effect in the country since 1975. However, after President Zia was assassinated by some members of the army in a failed coup d'état in May 1981, martial law was again imposed a year later after Zia's chief of army staff, General Hussain Mohammad Ershad, took over the government as chief martial law administrator by overthrowing the civilian government of Zia's vice-president and successor, President Abdus Sattar, in a bloodless coup on 24 March 1982. As the chief martial law administrator, Ershad installed a retired judge, A. F. M. Ahsanuddin Chowdhury, as president on 27 March 1982. Under this regime, Khan was appointed a deputy chief martial law administrator. At that time, he also became an adviser in the Ministry of Communications; he was made a minister of that ministry on 10 July 1982. Even after General Ershad took over the presidency in December 1983, Khan continued in this ministerial role in the Ministry of Communications until 1 June 1984. During Ershad's presidency, the chief of naval staff was also the minister of agriculture until his death.

== Personal life ==
Khan was married to Syeda Iqbal Mand Banu. Their youngest daughter, Zubaida Rahman, married Tarique Rahman in 1993. Tarique Rahman is the eldest son of Ziaur Rahman and Khaleda Zia, former prime minister.

== Death ==
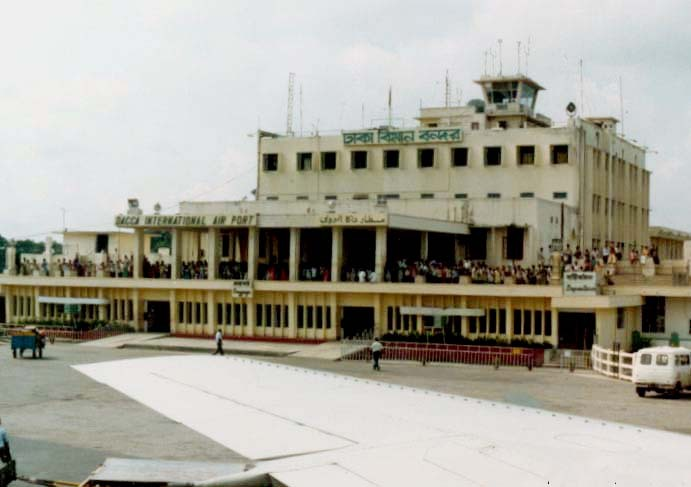
Khan had a heart attack in the then Dhaka International Airport while investigating an air crash in the airport area

On 6 August 1984, Khan went to the then Dhaka International Airport in Dhaka to investigate an air crash. While investigating the air crash, he had a heart attack and was taken to the Combined Military Hospital, where he died at the age of 49. His burial place is at the Banani defence graveyard in Dhaka.

Military offices
Preceded by Rear Admiral Musharraf Hussain Khan	Chief of Naval Staff; 4 November 1979 - 6 August 1984	Succeeded by Rear Admiral Sultan Ahmed
