= Syeda Iqbal Mand Banu =

Bangladeshi social worker

- সৈয়দা ইকবাল মান্দ বানু
- Occupation: Social worker
- Spouse: Mahbub Ali Khan (died 1984)
- Children: Zubaida Rahman (daughter)
- Relatives: Tarique Rahman (son-in-law); Zaima Rahman (granddaughter)
- Awards: Independence Award (1995)

Syeda Iqbal Mand Banu is a Bangladeshi social worker. She is the mother-in-law of politician Tarique Rahman and wife of former Bangladesh Navy chief Mahbub Ali Khan. She was awarded the Independence Award in 1995. She has published poetry books and does watercolor paintings.

== Career ==
Banu founded SUROVI in 1979 which provides schooling for child domestic workers with her own maid being the first student of the school.

Banu received the Special Award for women from Kazi Mahbubullah and Begum Zebunnessa Janakalyan Trust in 1988.

In 2007, the Anti Corruption Commission (ACC) filed a case against Syed Iqbal Mand Banu, Zubaida Rahman, and Tarique Rahman for 48.1 million taka in unexplained wealth with Kafrul Police Station.

In January 2014, ACC filed a case against Banu for not submitting her wealth statement to the commission.

In 2017, Bangladesh Supreme Court squashed a corruption case against her by ACC for improper paperwork.

In June 2019, Banu and other relatives visited Khaleda Zia, while she was receiving treatment at Bangabandhu Sheikh Mujib Medical University, who had been in prison since 8 February 2018.

== Family ==
Banu was married to Mahbub Ali Khan, former chief of naval staff of the Bangladesh Navy. Their daughter, Zubaida Rahman, married Tarique Rahman, son of then prime minister Khaleda Zia and former president Ziaur Rahman, in 1993.

== Bibliography ==
- Jhora Pata
- Mone Pore
