= Irene Khan =

Bangladeshi British academic and lawyer

Her Excellency Irene Khan
- আইরিন খান
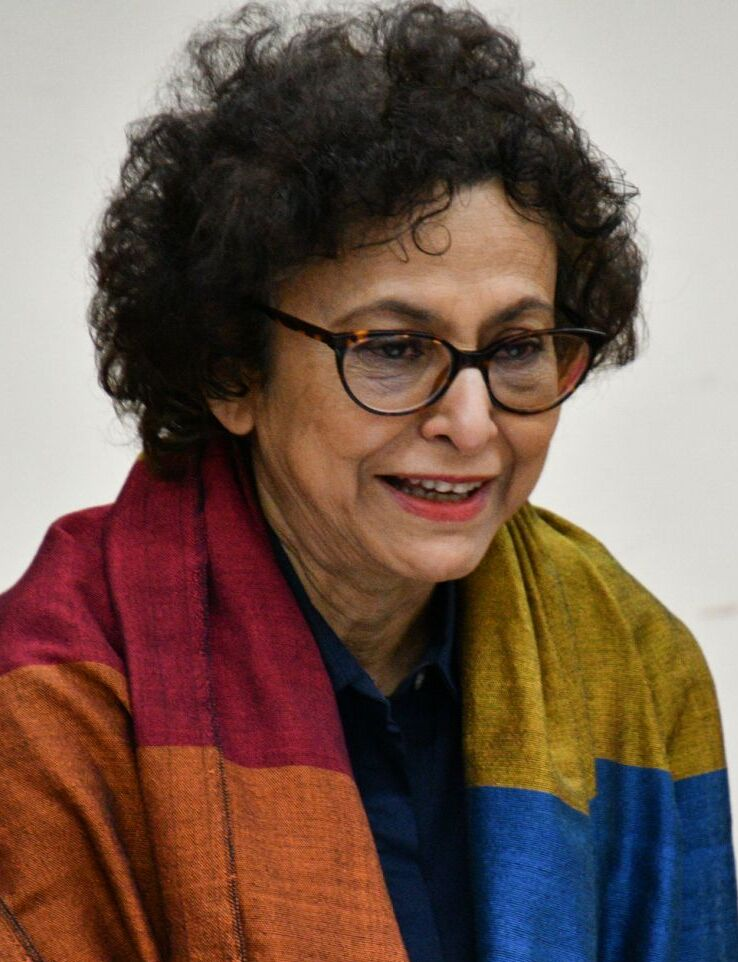
- Khan in 2024

Permanent Representative of Bangladesh to the United Nations
- Incumbent
- Assumed office 29 August 2026
- President: Mirza Fakhrul Islam Alamgir
- Prime Minister: Tarique Rahman
- Preceded by: Salahuddin Noman Chowdhury

UN Special Rapporteur on Freedom of Expression
- In office July 2020 – 29 August 2026
- Preceded by: David Kaye

Director-General of the International Development Law Organization
- In office January 2012 – December 2019
- Preceded by: William T. Loris
- Succeeded by: Jan Beagle

Chancellor of the University of Salford
- In office 2009–2015
- Preceded by: Professor Sir Martin Harris
- Succeeded by: Jackie Kay

Secretary-General of Amnesty International
- In office 2001–2009
- Preceded by: Pierre Sané
- Succeeded by: Salil Shetty

Personal details
- Born: Irene Zubaida Khan; 24 December 1956 (age 69) Dhaka, East Pakistan, Pakistan (now Bangladesh)
- Citizenship: Bangladesh; United Kingdom
- Relatives: Mahbub Ali Khan (Uncle); Zubaida Rahman (Cousin)
- Education: University of Manchester; Harvard Law School
- Profession: Diplomat

Irene Zubaida Khan (born 24 December 1956) is a British-Bangladeshi lawyer and human rights activist. She currently serves as the permanent representative of Bangladesh to the United Nations. Before joining this she was the UN special rapporteur on freedom of expression and opinion.

Khan served as the seventh secretary general of Amnesty International during 2001–2009. In 2011, she was elected director-general of the International Development Law Organization (IDLO) in Rome, an intergovernmental organisation that works to promote the rule of law, and sustainable development. She was a consulting editor of The Daily Star in Bangladesh from 2010 to 2011.

== Early life ==
Khan was born on 24 December 1956 in Dhaka, East Pakistan (now Bangladesh). Her ancestral home is in Birahimpur, Sylhet. She is the daughter of Sikander Ali Khan, a Bengali Muslim medical doctor; granddaughter of Ahmed Ali Khan, a Cambridge University mathematics graduate and barrister; and great-granddaughter of Assadar Ali Khan, the personal physician of Syed Hasan Imam. Her great-great-grandfather, Abid Khan, was the descendant of an Afghan migrant to Bengal. Her uncle, Rear Admiral Mahbub Ali Khan, was the chief of the Bangladesh Navy. She was the star pupil at the private English-language St Francis Xavier's Green Herald International School in Dhaka, 1964-1972 where she was the record holder at the school-leaving examinations.

During her childhood, East Pakistan became the independent nation of Bangladesh in 1971 following the Bangladesh Liberation War. The genocide that occurred during the war helped shape the teenage Khan's activist viewpoint.

During the famine, in which about one million people died in rural areas due to government food rationing in favour of urban dwellers, she left Bangladesh to attend the private Catholic St. Louis Grammar school in Kikeel, Northern Ireland 1973–1975. Her sister, who also moved there, not to a boarding school but to a Protestant family, attended the local high school. Khan went to England, where she studied law at the University of Manchester and then, in the United States, at Harvard Law School. She specialised in public international law and human rights.

== Career ==
=== Human rights ===
Khan helped to create the organisation Concern Universal in 1977, an international development and emergency relief organisation. She began her career as a human rights activist with the International Commission of Jurists in 1979.

Khan went to work at the United Nations in 1980. She spent 20 years at the United Nations High Commissioner for Refugees (UNHCR). In 1995 she was appointed UNHCR India's Chief of Mission, becoming the youngest UNHCR country representative at that time. During the Kosovo crisis in 1999, Khan led the UNHCR team in the Republic of Macedonia for three months. She was appointed as deputy director of International Protection of UNHCR later that year.

In August 2001, Khan was appointed as Secretary General of Amnesty International. During her tenure she expanded the mandate of Amnesty International to include economic, social and cultural rights, launched the first global campaign to Stop Violence Against Women, for which she received the Sydney Peace Prize, and campaigned against the War on Terror and unlawful detention of terrorism suspects in Guantanamo Bay.

In January 2012, Khan was elected by member states to serve as Director-General of the International Development Law Organization, the world's only inter-governmental organisation devoted to the rule of law and development.

In August 2020, the United Nations Human Rights Council, the highest human rights organ in the United Nations, appointed Khan to the position of Special Rapporteur on freedom of expression and opinion.

Khan is currently the chair of the supervisory board of BRAC International.

On 23 January 2024, Khan visited the Philippines and met with civil society and various organisations including the National Human Rights Commission and the National Privacy Commission to examine the state of rights to freedom of opinion and expression in the Philippines.

In January 2025, Khan visited Zambia for ten days at the invitation of the government of Zambia to assess the state of freedom of expression in that country.

=== Amnesty International ===
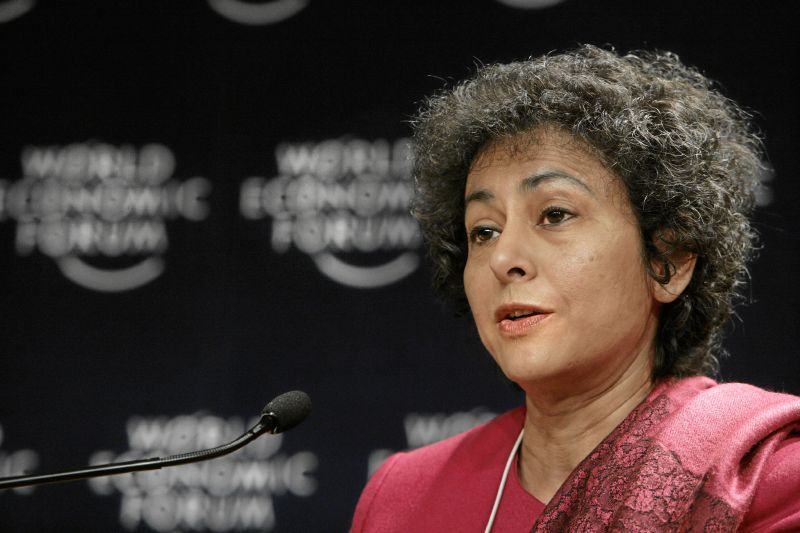
Khan at the World Economic Forum 2007

Khan joined Amnesty International in 2001 as its Secretary General. In her first year of office, she reformed Amnesty's response to human rights crises and launched the campaign to close the United States' Guantanamo Bay detention camp, which held suspected enemy combatants. In 2004 she initiated a global campaign to stop violence against women. In May 2009 Khan launched Amnesty's "Demand Dignity" campaign to fight human rights abuses that impoverish people and keep them poor.

=== Rule of law ===
During her leadership of IDLO, Khan promoted the notion that the rule of law is an important tool that can advance equity and people-centered development, whether in reducing inequalities or fostering social justice and inclusion for peace.

=== Role in Bangladesh's digital economy ===
Khan was appointed as the United Nations Special Rapporteur on the promotion and protection of the right to freedom of opinion and expression in August 2020, and has been a vocal advocate for digital rights and freedom of expression in Bangladesh. She is the first woman to hold this position since its establishment in 1993.

In her role, Khan expressed concerns over Bangladesh's Digital Security Act (DSA), describing it as imposing "draconian punishments for a wide range of vaguely defined acts" and granting authorities extensive powers for investigation and surveillance. She alsi called for the immediate repeal of the legislation, highlighting its use in detaining journalists and suppressing dissent.

Following the introduction of the Cyber Security Act (CSA) as a replacement for the DSA, Khan noted that the technical recommendations provided by the UN rights body were not reflected in the new legislation. She emphasised that the CSA retained many of the DSA's problematic provisions, including those related to criminal defamation and vague definitions of offences.

Khan highlighted the broader implications of such legislation on Bangladesh's digital economy, stating that restrictive laws can hinder innovation and economic growth. She advocates for legal frameworks that balance security concerns with the protection of fundamental rights, thereby fostering a conducive environment for digital development.

== Other activities ==
- Transparency International, member of the Advisory Council.
- Centre for Humanitarian Dialogue, member of the Board (since 2010)

== Recognition ==
=== In media ===
Khan is featured in a 2003 TV documentary titled Human Rights, by the French filmmaker Denis Delestrac. The film, shot in Colombia, Israel, Palestine and Pakistan, analyses how armed conflicts affect civilian communities and foster forced migration. In 2009 Khan was featured in Soldiers of Peace, an anti-war film.

=== Awards ===
- Khan received a Ford Foundation Fellowship in 1979.
- 2002, she received the Pilkington "Woman of the Year" Award as well as *2006, the Sydney Peace Prize.
- Since 2007, she has received several honorary doctorates, including from Ghent University, the University of London (School of Oriental and African Studies), and Manchester, St. Andrews, Salford and Staffordshire, and Edinburgh in UK, American University of Beirut (Lebanon), Ferris University (Japan), SOAS and State University of New York (USA).

In 2008, she was one of the two finalists for the election of the new Chancellor of the University of Manchester. In July 2009, she was appointed as Chancellor of the University of Salford a post she held until January 2015.

In 2006 she was awarded the City of Sydney Peace Prize for "her leadership as a courageous advocate of universal respect for human rights, and her skills in identifying violence against women as a massive injustice and therefore a priority in campaigning for peace.

== Controversies ==
=== "Gulag" controversy ===
In 2005, Irene Khan penned the introduction to that year's Amnesty International report in which she, inter alia, referred to the detention facility at Guantanamo Bay as "the gulag of our time," accusing the United States of "thumb[ing] its nose at the rule of law and human rights [as] it grants a licence to others to commit abuse with impunity". Much backlash followed in the media. Michael Totten of World Affairs called her a "hysterical heavy-breather". An editorial opinion in the Washington Post stated: "It's always sad when a solid, trustworthy institution loses its bearings and joins in the partisan fracas that nowadays passes for political discourse". John Podhoretz of the New York Post said that "[t]he case of Amnesty International proves that well-meaning people can make morality their life's work and still be little more than moral idiots." In his The United Nations, Peace and Security, Ramesh Thakur called Khan's likening of the Guantanamo Bay detention facility to a gulag a "hyperbole" that is "wrong". A former Soviet prisoner of conscience, Pavel Litvinov, told the Amnesty International staffer, who called him to inquire on behalf of Khan whether it would be appropriate to use the word 'gulag' in an Amnesty report and in relation in the Guantanamo Bay detention facility, that there was "an enormous difference" between the gulags and the Guantanamo Bay detention facility. Roger Kimball of Arma Virumque called it "a preposterous remark". The Bush administration responded to it in the following manner: President Bush called it "an absurd allegation;" Vice-President Cheney said he was "offended by it;" Defense Secretary Rumsfeld called it "reprehensible" and "those who make such outlandish charges los[ing] any claim to objectivity or seriousness". Chairman of the Joint Chiefs of Staff Myers called it "absolutely irresponsible" The White House spokesman Scott McClellan called the characterisation "ridiculous". Anne Applebaum, the author of Gulag: A History, found this characterisation "infuriating," stating that "Amnesty misus[ed] language [and] discard[ed] its former neutrality" and that it "attack[ed] the American government for the satisfaction of [the Amnesty's] own political faction".

However, not everyone rallied against Khan's 'gulag' characterisation. Retired US State Department officer Edmund McWilliams who monitored prisoner abuse committed in the Soviet Union and Vietnam stated the following in support of Khan's characterisation: "I note that abuses that I reported on in those inhumane systems parallel abuses reported in Guantanamo, at the Bagram air base in Afghanistan and at the Abu Ghriab prison: prisoners suspended from the ceiling and beaten to death; widespread "waterboarding;" prisoners "disappeared" to preclude monitoring by the International Committee of the Red Cross—and all with almost no senior-level accountability". Aryeh Neier stated that the criticisms of Khan's statement were exaggerations and added, "The flurry of attention to Irene Khan's statement about the gulag probably contributed to a trend that had already been noted in prior years: namely, a decline in the organization's prestige in the United States to a level below its very high standing in Europe."

=== Pay controversy ===
In February 2011, newspaper stories in the UK revealed that Khan had received a payment of £533,103 from Amnesty International following her resignation from the organisation on 31 December 2009, a fact pointed to from Amnesty's records for the 2009–2010 financial year. The sum paid to her was in excess of four times her annual salary of £132,490. The deputy secretary general, Kate Gilmore, who also resigned in December 2009, received an ex-gratia payment of £320,000. Peter Pack, the chairman of Amnesty's International Executive Committee (IEC), initially stated on 19 February 2011: "The payments to outgoing secretary general Irene Khan shown in the accounts of AI (Amnesty International) Ltd for the year ending 31 March 2010 include payments made as part of a confidential agreement between AI Ltd and Irene Khan" and that "It is a term of this agreement that no further comment on it will be made by either party."

The payment and AI's initial response to its leakage to the press led to considerable outcry. Philip Davies, the Conservative MP for Shipley, decried the payment, telling the Daily Express: "I am sure people making donations to Amnesty, in the belief they are alleviating poverty, never dreamed they were subsidising a fat cat payout. This will disillusion many benefactors." On 21 February Peter Pack issued a further statement, in which he said that the payment was a "unique situation" that was "in the best interest of Amnesty's work" and that there would be no repetition of it. He stated that "the new secretary general, with the full support of the IEC, has initiated a process to review our employment policies and procedures to ensure that such a situation does not happen again." Pack also stated that Amnesty was "fully committed to applying all the resources that we receive from our millions of supporters to the fight for human rights". On 25 February, Pack issued a letter to Amnesty members and staff. In summary, it states that the IEC in 2008 had decided not to prolong Khan's contract for a third term. In the following months, IEC discovered that due to British employment law, it had to choose between the three options of either offering Khan a third term, discontinuing her post and, in their judgement, risking legal consequences, or signing a confidential agreement and issuing a pay compensation.

Khan's lawyers issued a letter published by the Charity Times "It was not accurate of Amnesty International to record in its 2009/2010 corporate accounts that the amount £532,000 was paid to our client". The published letter detailed the sum as including: a) her salary and contractual benefits until 31 December 2009; b) outstanding back pay and the shortfall arising in her contractual benefits from previous years (in some part going back to 2005); relocation costs for her return abroad from where she had been recruited; d) compensation as well as severance payment (£115,000 gross) in respect of a legal claim and grievances that our client had asserted against Amnesty International Limited pursuant to her UK employment rights). Outgoing IEC Chairman Peter Pack, stated that paying off Khan was "the least worst option" available to IEC. The amount paid out to Khan and her deputy (who was also removed by IEC) amounted to 4% of Amnesty International's budget that year. The organisation was hurt by this scandal and by choosing to pay Khan to leave, with Chairman Pack promising to make amends and move the organisation forward following Khan's departure.

== Family ==
Khan is a cousin of Zubaida Rahman, the wife of the current Prime Minister of Bangladesh Tarique Rahman. Khan's uncle Rear Admiral Mahbub Ali Khan was the Chief of the Naval Staff of Bangladesh during the regime of Ziaur Rahman.

== Publications ==
- Irene Khan; Petrasek David (2009). The Unheard Truth: Poverty and Human Rights. W.W. Norton & Co. p. 250. ISBN 0-393-33700-6.
