= Zubaida Rahman =

Bangladeshi doctor (born 1972)

- জোবাইদা রহমান
- Zubaida Rahman Khan in 2026
- Born: Zubaida Khan; 18 June 1972 (age 54); Sylhet, Bangladesh
- Education: Dhaka Medical College; Imperial College London
- Occupation: Physician
- Known for: Spouse of the prime minister of Bangladesh (2026–present)
- Political party: Bangladesh Nationalist Party
- Spouse: Tarique Rahman (m. 1994)
- Children: Zaima Rahman
- Parents: Mahbub Ali Khan (father); Syeda Iqbal Mand Banu (mother)
- Relatives: M. A. G. Osmani (uncle); Khaleda Zia (mother-in-law); Irene Khan (cousin); See Majumder–Zia family
- Website: zubaidarahman.net

Zubaida Rahman (Bengali: জোবাইদা রহমান, née Khan) is a Bangladeshi physician, and the wife of prime minister Tarique Rahman.

== Personal life ==
Zubaida Rahman and her family members with Muhammad Yunus at the State Guest House, 2026

Zubaida Khan was born in Sylhet. She is the daughter of Rear Admiral Mahbub Ali Khan, who was Chief of the Naval Staff of Bangladesh during the government of Ziaur Rahman and Minister of Communications and Agriculture in the government of Hussain Muhammad Ershad.

Zubaida's uncle is General M. A. G. Osmani, the commander-in-chief of Bangladesh's war of independence. She is also the cousin of Amnesty International's former Secretary General Irene Khan.

Zubaida married Tarique Rahman on 3 February 1994. After Tarique's release from prison in 2008, she took a study leave and went to London with him. In May 2025, after the fall of the Hasina government, she returned to Bangladesh.

== Career ==
In 1995, Zubaida joined the public health cadre of the Bangladesh Civil Service (BCS) as a doctor. After moving to London in 2008, she studied medicine post-graduate at Imperial College London. The Awami League government cancelled her job in September 2014. In 2016, Sheikh Hasina praised Zubaida Rahman, endorsing her potential as a promising political figure.

In May 2025, after returning from a 17-year exile, she was rumored to be reinstated to her position in government service.

== Prosecution ==
In 2007, Zubaida received a three-year prison term in connection with a corruption case initiated by the Anti Corruption Commission. Her husband's family members and two top leaders of BNP were convicted in the corruption case, but despite Zubaida's leadership of the party, she never participated in the National Assembly elections or was seen directly in politics. In October 2024, her jail term was suspended. On May 28, 2025, the High Court overturned her conviction on appeal.
