= Tarique Rahman =

Prime Minister of Bangladesh since 2026

- তারেক রহমান
- Rahman in 2026

Prime Minister of Bangladesh
- Incumbent
- Assumed office 17 February 2026
- President: Mohammed Shahabuddin; Hafiz Uddin Ahmad (acting); Mirza Fakhrul Islam Alamgir
- Preceded by: Sheikh Hasina; Muhammad Yunus (as Chief Adviser)
Additional ministries
Incumbent
Assumed office 17 February 2026
Ministry and Departments	Cabinet Division; Armed Forces Division; Ministry of Defence; Prime Minister's Office
Preceded by	Sheikh Hasina; Muhammad Yunus (as Chief Adviser)

Chairman of the Bangladesh Nationalist Party
- Incumbent
- Assumed office 9 January 2026 (Note: Acting: 8 February 2018 – 9 January 2026)
- Secretary: Mirza Fakhrul Islam Alamgir; Ruhul Kabir Rizvi (acting)
- Preceded by: Khaleda Zia

Member of the Bangladesh Parliament for Dhaka-17
- Incumbent
- Assumed office 17 February 2026
- Preceded by: Mohammad Ali Arafat

Personal details
- Born: 20 November 1968 (age 57) Dacca, East Pakistan
- Party: Bangladesh Nationalist Party
- Spouse: Zubaida Khan (m. 1994)
- Relations: Arafat Rahman (Koko) (brother); Mahbub Ali Khan (father-in-law); Irene Khan (cousin-in-law)
- Children: Zaima Rahman
- Parents: Ziaur Rahman; Khaleda Zia
- Relatives: Majumder–Zia family
- Education: Dhaka Residential Model College (SSC); Adamjee Cantonment College (HSC)
- Website: www.tariquerahman.info
- Nickname: Pinu

Tarique Rahman (Note: Bengali: তারেক রহমান, romanized: Tārēk Rôhômān, pronounced [ˈtaːɾek ˈɾɔɦoman]) (born 20 November 1968), also known as Tarique Zia, (Note: Bengali: তারেক জিয়া, romanized: Tārēk Jiẏā, pronounced [ˈtaːɾek ˈd͡ʒija]) is a Bangladeshi politician who has served as the Prime Minister of Bangladesh and Chairman of the Bangladesh Nationalist Party (BNP) since 2026. He is the eldest son of former President Ziaur Rahman and former Prime Minister Khaleda Zia.

Born in 1968, Rahman rose to prominence in the Bangladesh Nationalist Party during Khaleda Zia's premiership. During the tenure of the military-backed caretaker government, he was detained in 2007. Following his release in parole in 2008, he went into self-imposed exile in London, UK with his family.

During his mother’s premiership, Rahman was a controversial figure. Critics alleged that he used Hawa Bhaban as a parallel centre of power and that he was involved in corruption, bribery and money laundering. (Note: Multiple sources:) Between 2007 and 2024, 84 cases were filed against him, and he was convicted in five of them, including the 2004 grenade attacks case, a money laundering case and a case of acquiring wealth beyond known sources of income. His party stated that the cases were politically motivated. Following the fall of the Awami League government in August 2024, his convictions were overturned on appeal between 2024 and 2025.

Rahman subsequently returned to Bangladesh in late 2025 and won in the 2026 general election. He was listed on 100 Most Influential People in the World by Time Magazine in 2026.

== Early life and education ==
Tarique Rahman was born on 20 November 1968 in Dhaka. He mentioned the year 1965 on his personal website. However, his birth year is mentioned as 1968 on his national identity card in the election affidavit. He belongs to a notable Bengali family of Muslim Mandals hailing from Bagbari in Gabtali, Bogura District. His father, Ziaur Rahman, was a military officer who would later become a Bir Uttom recipient and the president of Bangladesh, and his mother, Khaleda Zia, was a homemaker from Fulgazi, Feni who would later become the prime minister of Bangladesh.

Rahman started his education at BAF Shaheen College Dhaka. He studied for a short time at St. Joseph Higher Secondary School. Then he completed his secondary education from Dhaka Residential Model College and HSC from Adamjee Cantonment College. In the 1985–86 academic year, he was first admitted to the Department of Law at the University of Dhaka and then changed departments and enrolled in the Department of International Relations. However, during his second year of undergraduate studies, he dropped out and started a business in the textile industry and shipping sector.

== Early political career ==
Rahman started his political career as a primary member of the local upazila branch of the BNP in Gabtali, Bogura, in 1988.

Rahman was active in BNP campaign activities during the 1991 national election in constituencies where his mother, Khaleda Zia, was a candidate, which took place during Bangladesh's transition from military rule to an elected government.

Following the BNP's victory in the 1991 national election, Rahman continued to be involved in party activities in Bogra. During the 1996 national election, he did not contest any parliamentary seat and instead participated in campaign coordination activities for constituencies in which his mother, Khaleda Zia, was a candidate.

Between 1996 and 2001, during the tenure of the Awami League government, Rahman was involved in opposition political activities. In the 2001 national election, the Bangladesh Nationalist Party won a two-thirds majority.

During the BNP-led government (2001–2006), the 2004 Dhaka grenade attack took place at a public rally of the Awami League. The attack targeted senior party leaders, including the then opposition leader, Sheikh Hasina, killing 24 people, among them Ivy Rahman, and injuring several hundred others. Rahman was later convicted in connection with the case and sentenced to life imprisonment. In 2024, an appellate court overturned the verdict and acquitted him, citing procedural irregularities in the earlier trial.

== Exile to United Kingdom (2008–2025) ==
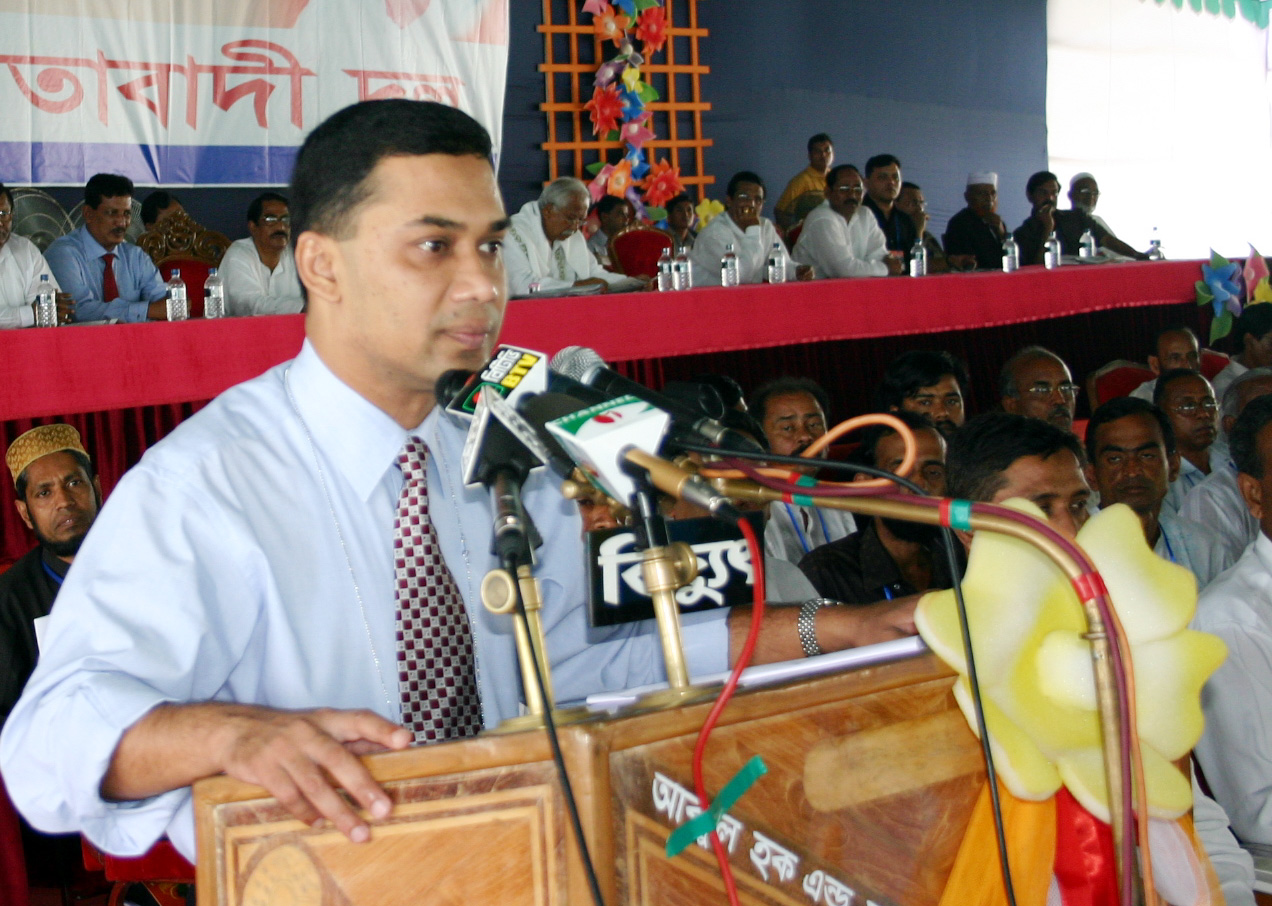
Tarique giving a speech at a BNP program, 2005.

Following the release of Khaleda Zia, Rahman was also released from prison on 11 September 2008 after around 18 months in detention under the military-backed 1/11 caretaker government. He subsequently left for London to receive medical treatment at Wellington Hospital, an independent private hospital in St. John's Wood, reportedly after negotiations with the authorities, and remained abroad while facing multiple corruption cases filed during the emergency period. The 1/11 caretaker government, confirmed that he had given a written promise not to indulge in any future politics and was thus allowed to go abroad instead being accused of multiple corruption cases.

=== Senior Vice Chairman of the BNP ===
On 8 December 2009, Rahman was elected Senior Vice Chairman of the BNP at its 5th National Council held in Dhaka; he was previously the party's Senior Joint Secretary General. A recorded speech by him was broadcast at the council, in which he referred to his arrest and treatment during detention under the military-backed caretaker government that assumed power in January 2007. In the speech, Rahman alleged that he had been subjected to torture and claimed that there had been a conspiracy to kill him under what he described as the guise of a judicial process. He also spoke about his physical condition, stating that he required additional time to complete medical treatment.

BNP chairperson Khaleda Zia later stated that her son would re-enter active politics following his return from abroad after completing medical treatment. While addressing several public meetings during a visit to Bogra, she alleged that the then government was attempting to harass him in order to prevent his return to Bangladesh. Referring to his detention and subsequent medical condition, she said that multiple cases had been filed against him as part of what she described as broader conspiracies, and that doctors had indicated his recovery would take additional time.

On 4 January 2014, in a video message posted on YouTube, Rahman called for a boycott of the national election scheduled for the following day.

In 2015, Rahman registered a private firm, White and Blue Consultants Limited, described as a public relations and communications company, in the United Kingdom. Incorporation documents filed with Companies House initially listed his nationality as British; however, the records were amended in 2016 to state his nationality as Bangladeshi. The initial listing was cited by several commentators and government officials, including Md. Shahriar Alam, as evidence supporting claims that Rahman had acquired British citizenship. Rahman denied the allegation and issued a legal notice to Shahriar Alam, seeking an apology for remarks alleging that he held British citizenship.

=== Acting Chairman of the BNP ===
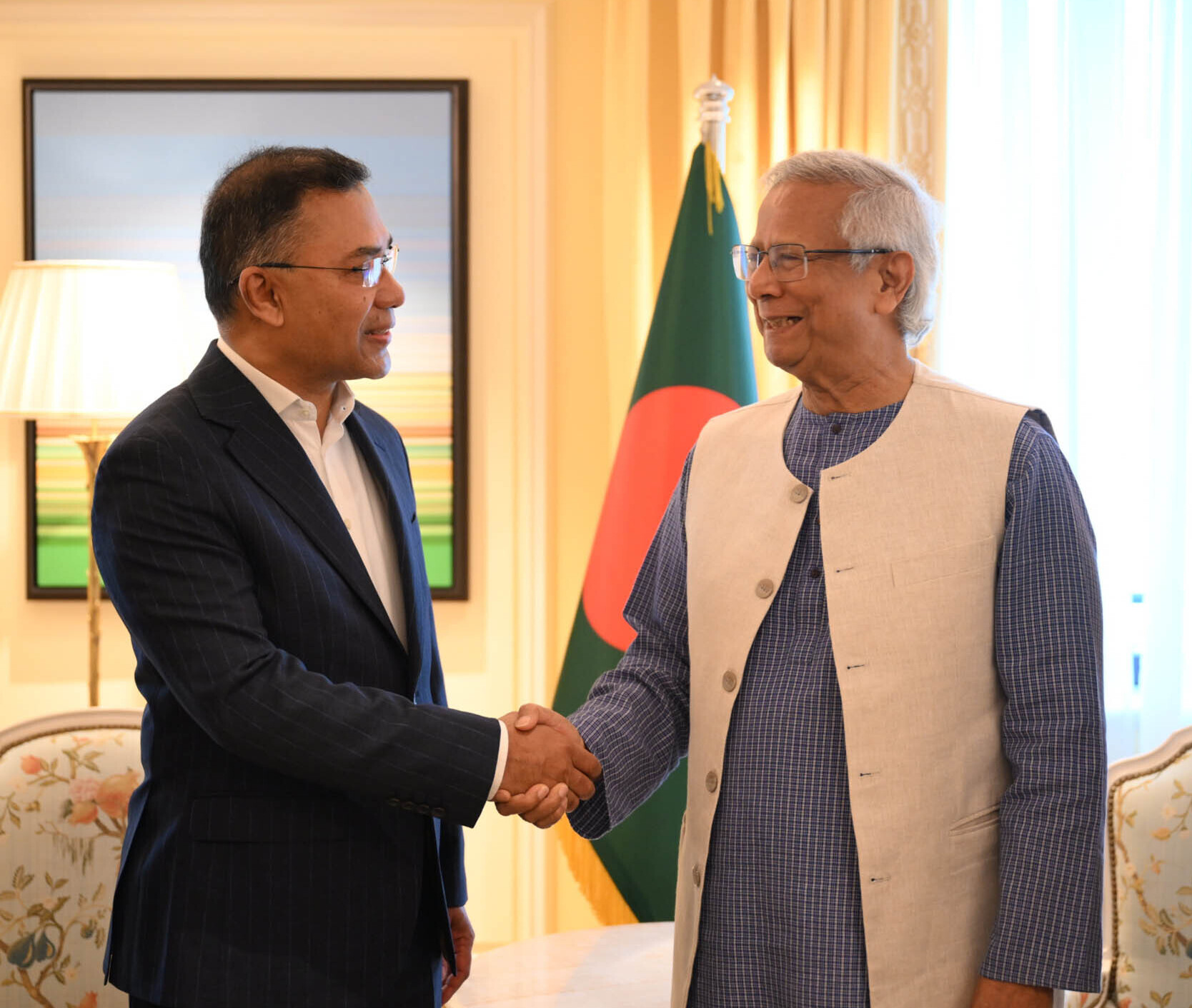
Tarique Rahman and Muhammad Yunus meeting in London, 2025.

In November 2018, Rahman conducted the interview process through Skype for the nomination seekers of BNP at the 2018 national election.

After the fall of Sheikh Hasina, he pledged to return to Bangladesh after the cases against him were lifted. He also pledged to support the reform process of the interim government.

On 13 June 2025, a private meeting was held between Rahman and the chief adviser of the interim government, Muhammad Yunus, who was on a visit to the United Kingdom. After the meeting, the representatives of both sides issued a joint statement. The meeting was cited as a "turning point" by the BNP sources.

=== Return to Bangladesh ===
On 25 December 2025, Rahman, along with his wife Zubaida Rahman and daughter Zaima Rahman, returned to Bangladesh, ending his exile since 2008. Five days later, Rahman's mother, Khaleda Zia, died after prolonged illness. Rahman chose to contest in both Bogra-6 and Dhaka-17 for the 2026 Bangladeshi general election. On 9 January 2026, Rahman became the chairman of Bangladesh Nationalist Party.

== Premiership (2026–present) ==
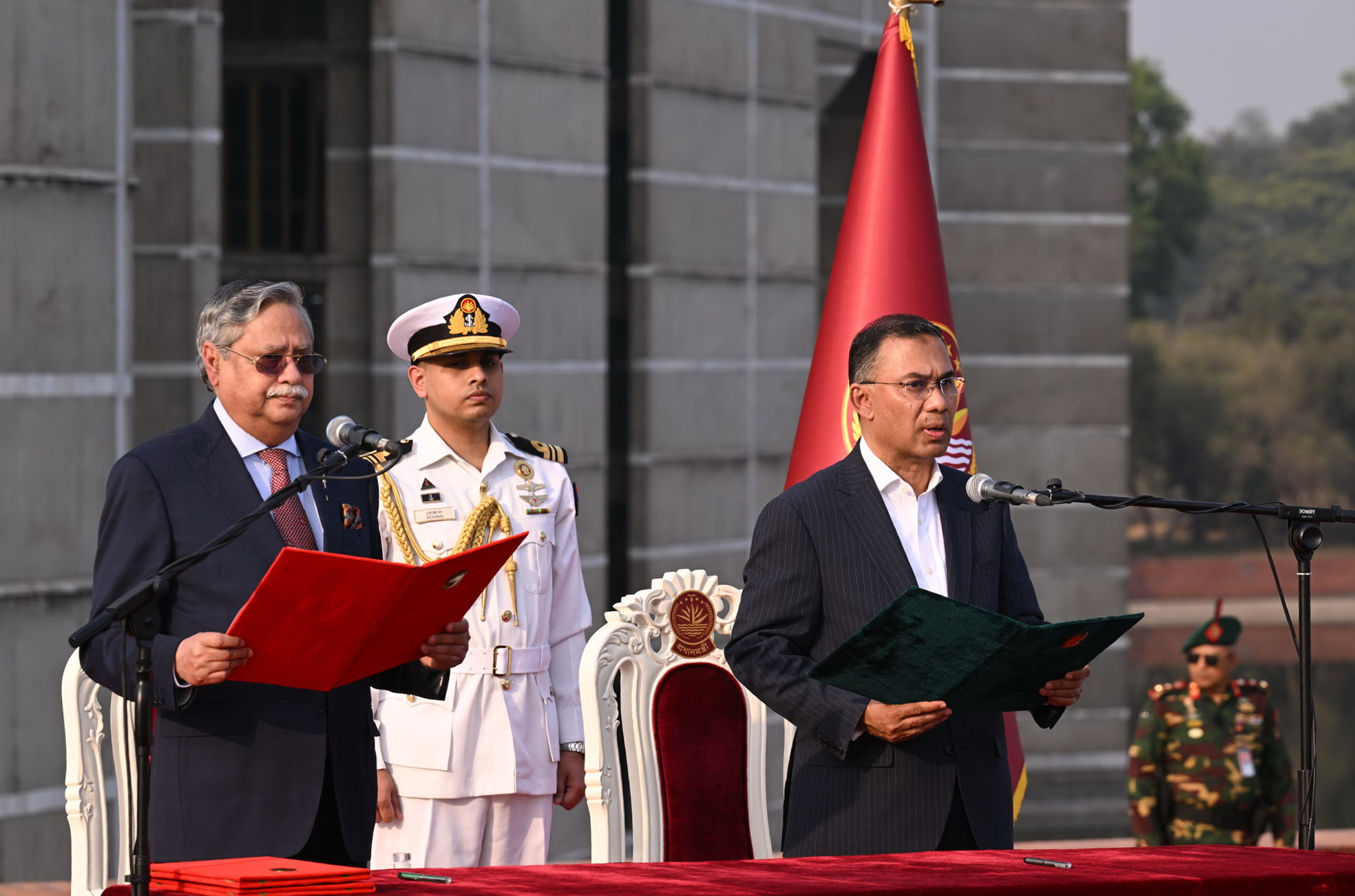
Rahman taking the oath of office as the 11th Prime Minister of Bangladesh on 17 February 2026, administered by President Mohammed Shahabuddin

The BNP won a landslide victory in the 2026 general election, with Rahman, as the party leader, being elected to the Jatiya Sangsad for his first term.

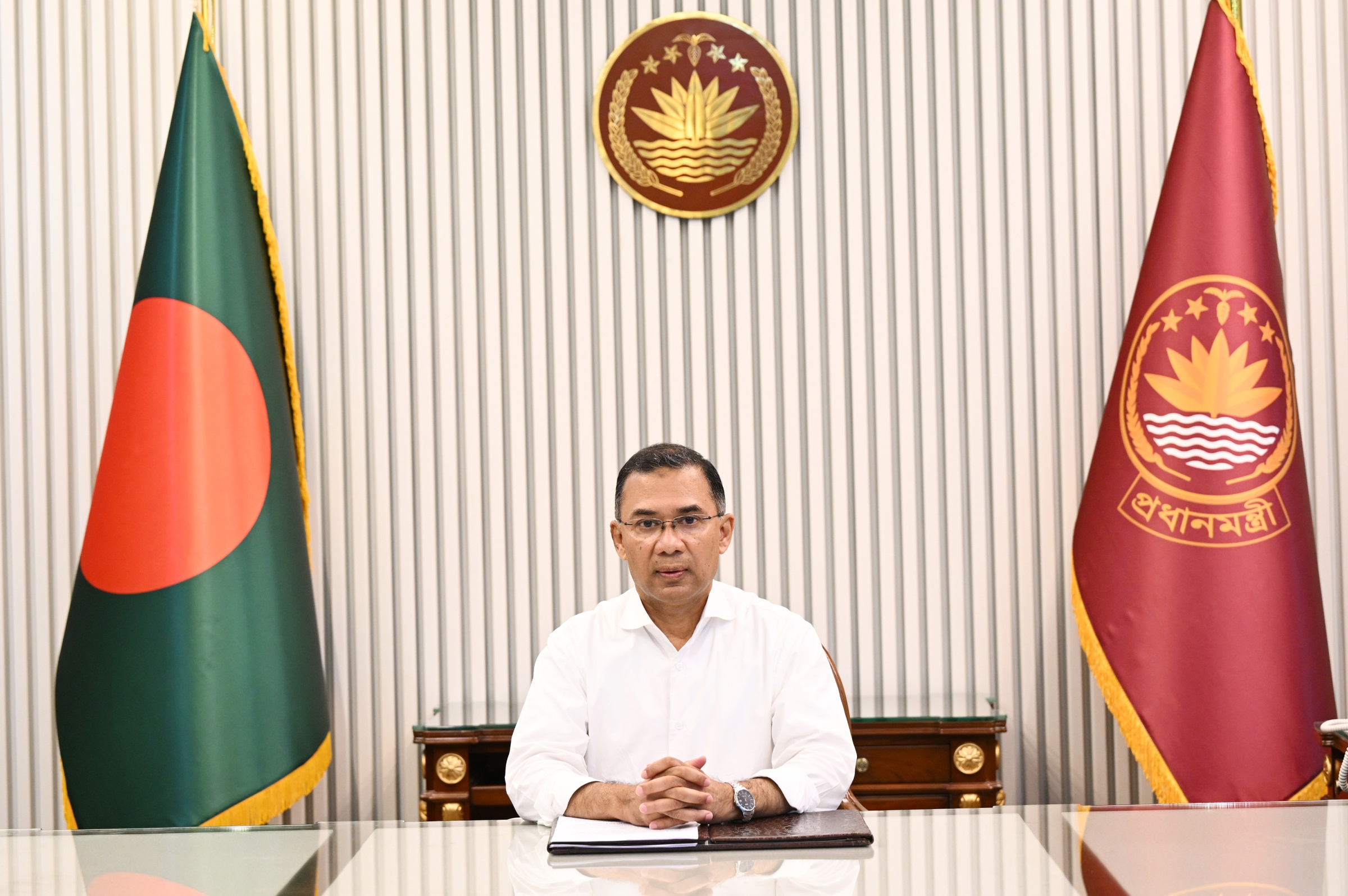
Rahman addressing the nation for the first time as the Prime Minister of Bangladesh on 18 February 2026

On 17 February 2026, Rahman was sworn in as the first Bangladeshi prime minister after the July Uprising. His victory marked the end of a 35-year-old tradition of female leadership in Bangladesh.

Rahman presiding over a cabinet meeting at Bangladesh Secretariat.

== Controversies ==
Rahman became the subject of a host of controversies during Khaleda Zia's third term, caretaker government of Iazuddin, and the Awami League government of Sheikh Hasina. Described as "politically motivated" attacks by the BNP, the courts in Dhaka have cleared him of all charges after July Uprising.

=== Power sector corruption allegation ===
During the 2001–2006 tenure of the Four-Party Alliance government, Rahman was frequently accused by political opponents of involvement in large-scale corruption within the power sector. The most prominent of these allegations became known as the "Khamba" (electric pole) controversy. Critics alleged that, Rahman and his business associates utilized the "Hawa Bhaban" office to influence the government contracts for the procurement of thousands of electric poles at inflated prices.

Reports from the period claimed that many of these poles were installed in rural areas without being connected to a functioning electrical grid. Detractors cited these "empty poles" as a symbol of systemic graft and mismanagement. In 2008, a United States Embassy cable later published by WikiLeaks characterized him as a "symbol of kleptocratic government". In a January 2026 article, Time noted that Rahman continues to be referred to by the derogatory nickname "Khamba Tarique" by his critics. Rahman denied the allegations, describing them as politically motivated attempts to undermine the leadership of the Bangladesh Nationalist Party (BNP).

=== Hawa Bhaban controversy ===
The allegations consist of Rahman and his associates allegedly accepting bribes from various businessmen and political rivals through Hawa Bhaban, the office of the chairman of the BNP and an alleged parallel power centre during Zia's tenure, laundering the money abroad. Based on these allegations, the Anti-Corruption Commission of Bangladesh (ACC) began an investigation in 2007, and he was also investigated by the Federal Bureau Investigation (FBI) in the United States and the courts in Singapore. They later stated that evidence of money laundering was found against Rahman.

In 2007, the Bangladeshi government launched an investigation against Rahman on charges of bribery and money laundering. The investigation led to allegations that he laundered about $20 million abroad. In 2010, a case was filed domestically based on the allegations. On 20 March 2025, the court acquitted him in this case.

=== Money laundering case ===
On 7 June 2007, a money laundering case was submitted against Rahman and his personal friend and business partner, Giasuddin Al Mamun, by the Bangladesh Anti Corruption Commission at a court in Dhaka. In a verdict given on 18 November 2013 by the court, Rahman was acquitted in the case involving BDT 20.41 crore. After delivering the verdict, the trial court judge left the country. Bangladesh Anti Corruption Commission member Mohammed Shahabuddin rejected the verdict, saying:

Tarique and Mamun had equal footing in the crime. So, legally there was no scope to differentiate.

BNP officials and leaders have claimed that this judgement is proof of his innocence, that he had no involvement with corruption, and that all the cases against Rahman were "politically motivated".

On 21 July 2016, Rahman was found guilty by the Bangladesh High Court, overturning a lower court verdict that acquitted him earlier. He was sentenced to seven years of imprisonment and fined Tk 20 crore by the Court.

Mamun's wider business dealings, closely associated with Rahman's political influence, led to further legal scrutiny. For example, in 2022, the ACC filed a graft case against Mamun's company, One Spinning Mills Limited, and its directors, for alleged loan embezzlement from Sonali Bank.

On 5 December 2024, Rahman and Mamun were acquitted by the high court of Bangladesh.

=== Illegal wealth acquisition ===
The ACC filed a case against Rahman, his wife Zubaida, and Zubaida's mother, Syeda Iqbal Banu, in 2007 during the military-backed caretaker government on allegations that Rahman and his wife had illegal assets worth more than 48 million taka beyond their declared income.

On 31 March 2009, the investigating officer filed a chargesheet against the three in court. However, the trial against Zubaida's mother was later dismissed. The court recorded the statements of 42 witnesses for the prosecution, including the complainant in the case.

A Dhaka court sentenced Rahman to nine years in prison and a fine of Tk 30 million, and his wife, Zubaida, to three years in prison and a fine of Tk 3.5 million. At the same time, the court ordered the confiscation of Rahman's illegal assets worth about Tk 3.5 million in favour of the state.

In October 2024, the interim government of Muhammad Yunus suspended the sentence of Rahman's wife for one year in a case filed on charges of acquiring wealth outside known sources of income, on the condition of surrender and appeal. On 28 May 2025, Rahman and his wife were acquitted of illegal wealth acquisition case by the High Court questioning procedural legitimacy of the case filed by the Anti-Corruption Commission.

=== The Zia Charitable Trust corruption controversy ===
The Zia Charitable Trust corruption case contains allegations filed against Rahman and his mother, among others. The Anti-Corruption Commission (ACC) filed the case in 2008. It was alleged that a foreign grant of about Tk 2.1 crore was given to the Zia Orphanage Trust in 2004, but it was used for personal purposes instead of being spent on the trust's work. This led to allegations of misuse of state resources.

The case named Rahman and his mother, former prime minister Khaleda Zia, accusing them of personally embezzling foreign grant money. Although Zia was directly accused in the case, Rahman's name was discussed in the case due to the political situation at the time and his political position.

The trial of the case began in 2011. Following the investigation and judicial proceedings, on 8 February 2018, a special court in Dhaka sentenced Zia to 5 years in prison and Rahman and the other accused to 10 years in prison. The High Court later doubled Zia's jail term in that case. Since Rahman was in self-imposed exile in the United Kingdom, he did not appear in court, and the verdict was delivered in his absence. The verdict caused a large impact on domestic politics in Bangladesh. Zia appealed to the High Court to suspend her sentence and was released on bail for some time. Rahman, however, was issued an international arrest warrant. The BNP and its supporters have claimed that the case is politically motivated, while the Awami League has called it an important legal step. The verdict in the case has been the subject of disagreement among various political analysts and legal experts.

On 15 January 2025, Zia and Rahman, along with all the accused, were acquitted in the case.

=== 2004 Dhaka grenade attack case ===
On 21 August 2004, a grenade attack on an Awami League rally in Dhaka killed 24 people and injured about 300, including then-opposition leader Sheikh Hasina. On 22 August, Motijheel Police Station Sub-Inspector (SI) Faruk Ahmed filed a case as the plaintiff. Rahman was initially not named as an accused in the case. The Awami League condemned the BNP government's handling of the investigation. The BNP denies any link to the attack.

When the reinvestigation of the case began during the caretaker government in 2007, the names of Mufti Abdul Hannan, leader of the banned organization Harkatul Jihad, and Abdus Salam Pintu, deputy minister of the then BNP government, came up.

When the Awami League came to power in 2009, a further investigation was carried out. The investigation revealed the names of Rahman and other high-ranking BNP leaders. In 2011, Rahman was named as the alleged main conspirator in the supplementary charge sheet and was formally charged in the case. He was accused of being the mastermind of the attack by Awami League General Secretary Obaidul Quader; however, the accusation was denied by BNP Secretary General Mirza Fakhrul Islam Alamgir.

The trial officially began in 2012. After a long hearing, the Dhaka Speedy Trial Tribunal announced its verdict in the 21 August grenade attack case on 10 October 2018. The court identified Rahman as the main conspirator of the attack and sentenced him to life imprisonment in the verdict for the case. However, the verdict was given in his absence as he was abroad. He was shown as a 'fugitive' in the charge sheet.

On 22 November 2024, the High Court concluded a hearing on the appeals and death references of the grenade attack cases. On 1 December 2024, Rahman, Lutfozzaman Babar, and 47 others were acquitted by the court. The High Court has recommended that the Home Ministry take the necessary measures to conduct a new investigation into the 21 August grenade attack case through appropriate and expert agencies to ensure justice.

=== 10-truck arms and ammunition haul ===
The 10-truck arms case began on 28 April 2004, when a large quantity of arms and ammunition was seized in 10 trucks in Chittagong. Rahman was accused of being involved in the arms, and it was claimed that the arms were collected for use in gunfights during the BNP government. It was alleged that the arms were intended to be smuggled to banned armed groups in India. Rahman and other BNP leaders were investigated for their involvement in the case. It was alleged that Tarique Rahman was involved in the arms smuggling scheme. The BNP later filed a complaint, considering the case to be politically motivated. They claimed that the case was part of a political vendetta and Rahman was deliberately targeted.

On 18 December 2024, the High Court acquitted four people in the case, including former State Minister for Home Affairs Lutfuzzaman Babar and former Director General of NSI, retired Major General Rezzakul Haider Chowdhury.

=== Sedition and other cases ===
In 2014, Rahman made a speech about Sheikh Mujibur Rahman at an event in London during a discussion organized by the BNP. He referred to Mujib as a "Razakar" and "Pakbandhu" (friend of Pakistan), among other words. Following the speech, he was termed as "insolent" and "stupid" by his political rivals, and multiple legal notices and sedition cases were filed throughout the country.

On 22 January 2014, the Awami League's Jessore district unit's then-organizing secretary, filed a lawsuit, claiming that Rahman had committed sedition by making the comments about Mujib. On 4 April 2017, the police handed in the charge sheet to the court. The court subsequently issued an arrest warrant in the case against Rahman. On 10 March 2025, the District and Sessions Judge's Court Jessore acquitted Rahman and dismissed a sedition case filed in 2014. In addiiton, on 28 February 2015, President of the Subornachar Upazila Awami League, filed a case against Rahman at the Noakhali Chief Judicial Magistrate's Court. On 4 April 2017, the police filed the charge sheet to the court. The court subsequently issued an arrest warrant for Rahman in the matter. On 21 August 2024, the Noakhali Additional District and Sessions Judge Court acquitted him of sedition charges laid on 4 April 2017.

In another controversy, on 5 January 2015, Rahman delivered a live statement on the Ekushey TV channel. Tejgaon Police Station filed a case claiming that Rahman, in collusion with others, was allegedly involved in publishing false and fabricated information, posing a threat to the sovereignty of the country, and "spreading hatred" against the government. On 6 September 2017, police handed in a chargesheet against them. On 31 October 2024, The High Court scrapped the case.

=== Controversy over historical claim about BNP symbol ===
In April 2026, Rahman faced criticism in the social media after claiming in a public speech that Bangladesh Nationalist Party leader Ziaur Rahman received the "sheaf of paddy" symbol from Maulana Bhasani during the 1979 election period. Historians noted a chronological inconsistency, as Bhasani died in 1976, prior to the events described. However, political analysts say that the statement may have been made in a symbolic sense.

== Personal life ==
Tarique Rahman and his family members, including Arafat Rahman's wife and daughters, met with Muhammad Yunus at the State Guest House Jamuna in March 2026.

Rahman married Zubaida Khan on 3 February 1994, a physician and the youngest daughter of Rear Admiral Mahbub Ali Khan, former Chief of Naval Staff of Bangladesh Navy and the first cousin of Irene Khan, currently serving as the United Nations Special Rapporteur for freedom of expression and opinion. Zubaida became a government physician in 1995 after passing the Bangladesh Civil Service (BCS) exam and was later fired by the Awami League government, in September 2014, for being absent from work for six years. Their only daughter, Zaima Rahman, is a barrister.

== Electoral history ==
Year	Constituency	Party	Votes	%	Result
2026	Bogura-6	Bangladesh Nationalist Party	216,284	68.90	Won
2026	Dhaka-17	Bangladesh Nationalist Party	72,699	51.56	Won
Source:The Daily Star

== Bibliography ==
- সবার আগে বাংলাদেশ (Sobar Age Bangladesh)

== Footnotes ==
Party political offices
Preceded by Khaleda Zia	Chairperson of the Bangladesh Nationalist Party; 2026–present	Incumbent
Preceded by Khaleda Zia	Acting Chairperson of the Bangladesh Nationalist Party; 2018–2025	Succeeded by Himself
Assembly seats
Preceded by Sheikh Hasina	Leader of the House; 2026–present	Incumbent
Preceded by Mohammad A. Arafat	Member of Parliament for Dhaka-17; 2026–present	Incumbent
Political offices
Preceded by Muhammad Yunus as chief adviser	Prime Minister of Bangladesh; 2026–present	Incumbent
Order of precedence
Preceded by Mirza Fakhrul Islam Alamgir as President	Order of precedence of Bangladesh as Prime Minister	Followed by Hafiz Uddin Ahmad as Speaker of the Parliament
