= Electoral history of Khaleda Zia =

Elections featuring Prime Minister of Bangladesh

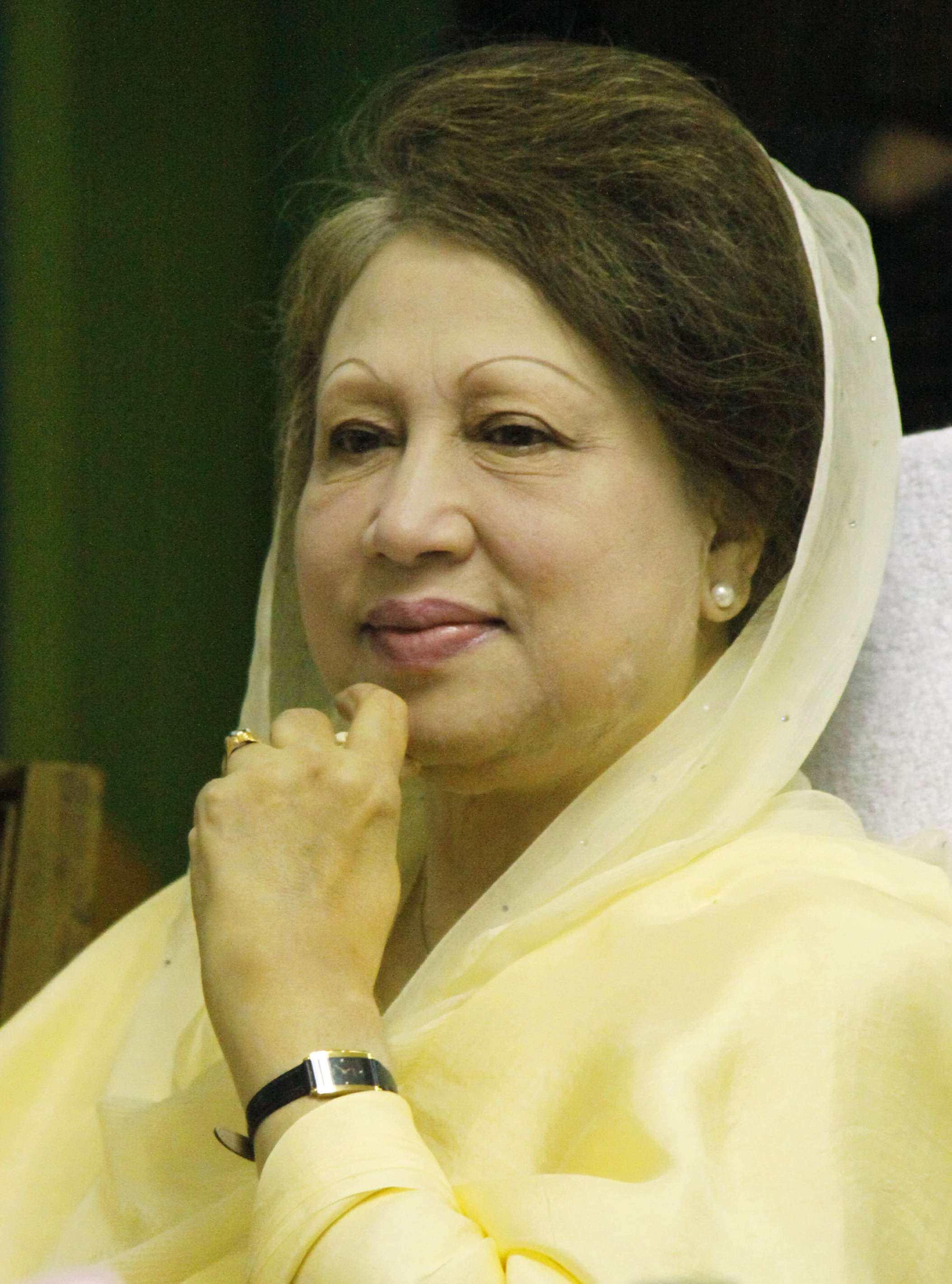
Khaleda Zia

This is a summary of the electoral history of Khaleda Zia, who served as the prime minister of Bangladesh from March 1991 to March 1996, and again from June 2001 to October 2006.

Khaleda Zia won elections in Feni, Bogura, Dhaka, Chittagong, and Laxmipur; wherever she contested, she won. Khaleda Zia is the only example in the country's electoral history of someone who contested 23 parliamentary seats in 5 parliamentary elections and won each one. Even in the elections where the BNP could not form the government, she won all the seats she contested.

== Summary ==
| Year | Constituency | Party | Votes | % | Result |
|---|---|---|---|---|---|
| 1991 | Bogra-7 | BNP | 83,854 | 66.9 | Won |
| 1991 | Dhaka-5 | BNP | 71,266 | 51.5 | Won |
| 1991 | Dhaka-9 | BNP | 55,946 | 60.4 | Won |
| 1991 | Feni-1 | BNP | 36,375 | 38.7 | Won |
| 1991 | Chittagong-8 | BNP | 69,422 | 52.1 | Won |
| June 1996 | Bogra-6 | BNP | 1,36,669 | 58.9 | Won |
| June 1996 | Bogra-7 | BNP | 1,07,417 | 72.1 | Won |
| June 1996 | Feni-1 | BNP | 65,086 | 55.6 | Won |
| June 1996 | Lakshmipur-2 | BNP | 59,054 | 51.6 | Won |
| June 1996 | Chittagong-1 | BNP | 66,336 | 48.2 | Won |
| 2001 | | BNP | | | |
| 2001 | Bogra-6 | BNP | 2,27,355 | 78.6 | Won |
| 2001 | Bogra-7 | BNP | 1,47,522 | 79.0 | Won |
| 2001 | Khulna-2 | BNP | 91,819 | 57.8 | Won |
| 2001 | Lakshmipur-2 | BNP | 1,23,526 | 72.2 | Won |
| 2001 | Feni-1 | BNP | 1,03,149 | 72.2 | Won |
| 2008 | | BNP | | | |
| 2008 | Bogra-6 | BNP | 1,93,792 | 71.6 | Won |
| 2008 | Bogra-7 | BNP | 2,32,761 | 71.2 | Won |
| 2008 | Feni-1 | BNP | 1,14,482 | 65.4 | Won |

== Detailed results ==
=== 1991 general election ===
Khaleda Zia stood for five seats in the 1991 general election: Bogra-7, Dhaka-5, Dhaka-9, Feni-1, and Chittagong-8. After winning all five, she chose to represent Feni-1 and quit the other four.

==== Bogra-7 ====
General Election 1991: Bogra-7
| Party | Candidate | Votes | % | ±% |
|---|---|---|---|---|
| BNP | Khaleda Zia | 83,854 | 66.9 | |
| AL | TM Musa Pesta | 24,760 | 19.7 | |
| JI | Zamat Ali Prang | 15,440 | 12.3 | |
| WPB | Saleha Khatun | 748 | 0.6 | |
| JP(E) | Aminul Islam | 355 | 0.3 | |
| Jatiya Samajtantrik Dal-JSD | AH Azam Khan | 222 | 0.2 | |
| Majority | | 59,094 | 47.1 | |
| Turnout | | 125,379 | 66.8 | |
| BNP gain from JP(E) | | | | |

==== Dhaka-5 ====
General Election 1991: Dhaka-5
| Party | Candidate | Votes | % | ±% |
|---|---|---|---|---|
| BNP | Khaleda Zia | 71,266 | 51.5 | |
| AL | Sahara Khatun | 45,811 | 33.1 | |
| Independent | Mohammad Siraj Uddin Ahmed | 10,725 | 7.7 | |
| JP(E) | Golam Kadir | 3,947 | 2.9 | |
| Zaker Party | Md. Kaiser Hamid | 2,827 | 2.0 | |
| Bangladesh Janata Party | Saidul Islam Montu | 1,920 | 1.4 | |
| BKA | Mizanur Rahman Juktibadi | 821 | 0.6 | |
| Independent | Mojammal Huq | 436 | 0.3 | |
| Jatiya Samajtantrik Dal-JSD | Ataul Karim Faruk | 202 | 0.1 | |
| Janata Mukti Party | Shamsur Rahman | 168 | 0.1 | |
| Independent | G M L Kabir | 104 | 0.1 | |
| Bangladesh Republican Party | Shirajul Huq | 80 | 0.1 | |
| Bangladesh Jatiya Tanti Dal | Md. Yakub | 49 | 0.0 | |
| Independent | Md. Abul Hasan | 29 | 0.0 | |
| Janasakti Party | Md. Abdullah Al Naser | 26 | 0.0 | |
| Bangladesh Muslim League (Kader) | A. H. M. Amzad Hossian | 20 | 0.0 | |
| Jatiyatabadi Gonotantrik Chashi Dal | Afzaluddin Chowdhury | 14 | 0.0 | |
| Majority | | 25,455 | 18.4 | |
| Turnout | | 138,445 | 47.7 | |
| BNP gain from JP(E) | | | | |

==== Dhaka-9 ====
General Election 1991: Dhaka-9
| Party | Candidate | Votes | % | ±% |
|---|---|---|---|---|
| BNP | Khaleda Zia | 55,946 | 60.4 | |
| AL | Sajeda Chowdhury | 29,464 | 31.8 | |
| JI | Md. Ruhul Amin | 2,505 | 2.7 | |
| JP(E) | Umme Kawser Salma Bin | 1,829 | 2.0 | |
| Zaker Party | Taufiqur Rahman | 928 | 1.0 | |
| BKA | Md. Shahidul Alam Chowdhury | 455 | 0.5 | |
| Bangladesh Janata Party | Shamsuddin Ahmed | 432 | 0.5 | |
| Janata Mukti Party | Salah Uddin Chowdhury Bulu | 408 | 0.4 | |
| Independent | Shah Alam | 144 | 0.2 | |
| Pragotishil Ganatantrik Sakti | Md. Wahiduzzaman | 120 | 0.1 | |
| Independent | S. M. Majibar Rahman Majnu | 94 | 0.1 | |
| Independent | Shahab Uddin Ahmed | 75 | 0.1 | |
| JSD (S) | Zahanara Begum | 46 | 0.0 | |
| Pragotishi Jatiatabadi Dal (Nurul A Moula) | Md. Mostafizur Rahman Mostafa | 40 | 0.0 | |
| Bangladesh Bekar Samaj | Zahurul Alam | 39 | 0.0 | |
| BAKSAL | M. A. Satter | 36 | 0.0 | |
| Jatiya Sramajibi Party | Abdul Khalek | 28 | 0.0 | |
| NAP (Bhashani-Mur Mohammad Kazi) | Mujibur Rahman | 27 | 0.0 | |
| Bangladesh Jatiya People's Party | Md. Abdul Hai | 25 | 0.0 | |
| Bangladesh Manobatabadi Dal | Md. Razu Ahmed Razu | 25 | 0.0 | |
| Bangladesh Muslim League (Kader) | A. F. M. Harunar Rashid | 19 | 0.0 | |
| Independent | A. Naser Ajam Khan | 15 | 0.0 | |
| Majority | | 26,482 | 28.6 | |
| Turnout | | 92,700 | 50.3 | |
| BNP gain from JP(E) | | | | |

==== Feni-1 ====
General Election 1991: Feni-1
| Party | Candidate | Votes | % | ±% |
|---|---|---|---|---|
| BNP | Khaleda Zia | 36,375 | 38.7 | |
| AL | Md. Zakaria Bhuiyan | 23,250 | 24.7 | |
| JP(E) | Zafar Imam | 22,601 | 24.0 | |
| JI | Md. Yunus | 8,163 | 8.7 | |
| JSD | Shirin Akhter | 1,245 | 1.3 | |
| NAP (Muzaffar) | Mujibul Haq | 782 | 0.8 | |
| Pragotishi Jatiatabadi Dal (Nurul A Moula) | A. T. M. Golam Mawla Chowdhury | 517 | 0.5 | |
| Zaker Party | Abul Kalam | 452 | 0.5 | |
| BKA | Anwar Ullah | 367 | 0.4 | |
| Jatiya Samajtantrik Dal-JSD | Mir Abdul Hannan | 351 | 0.4 | |
| Majority | | 13,125 | 13.9 | |
| Turnout | | 94,103 | 45.4 | |
| BNP gain from AL | | | | |

==== Chittagong-8 ====
General Election 1991: Chittagong-8
| Party | Candidate | Votes | % | ±% |
|---|---|---|---|---|
| BNP | Khaleda Zia | 69,422 | 52.1 | |
| AL | Ishak Miah | 44,154 | 33.2 | |
| JI | Md. Abu Taher | 13,466 | 10.1 | |
| JP(E) | Liaqat | 3,141 | 2.4 | |
| JSD | Nuruddin Zahed | 1,388 | 1.0 | |
| IOJ | Jasim Uddin Faruki | 765 | 0.6 | |
| Zaker Party | Salim Ullah | 251 | 0.2 | |
| Independent | Siddqul Islam | 215 | 0.2 | |
| Jatiya Samajtantrik Dal-JSD | Md. Yusuf Ali | 139 | 0.1 | |
| NAP (Bhashani) | A. K. M. Golam Kabir | 137 | 0.1 | |
| Bangladesh Freedom Party | Nizamul Amin | 70 | 0.1 | |
| Majority | | 25,268 | 19.0 | |
| Turnout | | 133,148 | 56.0 | |
| BNP gain from | | | | |

=== June 1996 general election ===
Khaleda Zia stood for five seats in the June 1996 general election: Bogra-6, Bogra-7, Feni-1, Lakshmipur-2 and Chittagong-1. After winning all five, she chose to represent Feni-1 and quit the other four.

==== Bogra-6 ====
General Election June 1996: Bogra-6
| Party | Candidate | Votes | % | ±% |
|---|---|---|---|---|
| BNP | Khaleda Zia | 136,669 | 58.9 | +4.2 |
| JI | Golam Rabbani | 46,917 | 20.2 | −7.1 |
| AL | Md. Mahmudul Hassan | 36,747 | 15.8 | −0.1 |
| JP(E) | A. H. Golam Zakaria Khan | 10,185 | 4.4 | +3.9 |
| Independent | Md. Alberuni | 649 | 0.3 | N/A |
| JSD | AKM Rezaul Karim Tansen | 310 | 0.1 | N/A |
| Islamic Al Zihad Dal | Abu Nosor Md. Shohidullah | 288 | 0.1 | N/A |
| FP | M. L. Alam | 175 | 0.1 | N/A |
| Independent | M. R. Renu | 135 | 0.1 | N/A |
| Majority | | 89,752 | 38.7 | +11.3 |
| Turnout | | 232,075 | 78.2 | +13.8 |
| BNP hold | | | | |

==== Bogra-7 ====
General Election June 1996: Bogra-7
| Party | Candidate | Votes | % | ±% |
|---|---|---|---|---|
| BNP | Khaleda Zia | 107,417 | 72.1 | |
| AL | Md. Waliul Haque | 25,278 | 17.0 | |
| JI | Md. Fazle Rabbi | 15,678 | 10.5 | |
| Independent | A. B. M. Sirazul Islam | 271 | 0.2 | |
| Jatiya Samajtantrik Dal-JSD | Md. Rezaul Bari | 244 | 0.2 | |
| Bangladesh Samajtantrik Dal (Khalekuzzaman) | Shamsul Alam Dulu | 133 | 0.1 | |
| Majority | | 82,139 | 55.1 | |
| Turnout | | 149,021 | 79.5 | |
| BNP hold | | | | |

==== Feni-1 ====
General Election June 1996: Feni-1
| Party | Candidate | Votes | % | ±% |
|---|---|---|---|---|
| BNP | Khaleda Zia | 65,086 | 55.6 | +16.9 |
| AL | M. Wazi. Ullah Bhuiyan | 24,138 | 20.6 | −4.1 |
| JP(E) | Zafar Imam | 15,897 | 13.6 | −10.4 |
| JI | Md. Yunus | 8,480 | 7.2 | −1.5 |
| IOJ | Habibur Rahman | 1,758 | 1.5 | N/A |
| Pragotishi Jatiatabadi Dal (Nurul A Moula) | A. T. M. Golam Mawla Chowdhury | 385 | 0.3 | −0.2 |
| Zaker Party | Abdul Kalam Majumder | 300 | 0.3 | −0.2 |
| BKA | Anowar Ullah Bhuiyan | 289 | 0.2 | −0.2 |
| Jatiya Samajtantrik Dal-JSD | Joinal Abedin | 265 | 0.2 | −0.2 |
| BIF | Ruhul Amin | 265 | 0.2 | N/A |
| Bangladesh Samyabadi Dal (Marxist-Leninist) | Safiqur Rahman Majumder | 156 | 0.1 | N/A |
| Gano Forum | Qazi Faruk | 133 | 0.1 | N/A |
| Majority | | 40,948 | 35.0 | +21.1 |
| Turnout | | 117,152 | 74.5 | +29.1 |
| BNP hold | | Swing | +10.5 | |

==== Lakshmipur-2 ====
General Election June 1996: Lakshmipur-2
| Party | Candidate | Votes | % | ±% |
|---|---|---|---|---|
| BNP | Begum Khaleda Zia | 59,054 | 51.6 | −1.9 |
| AL | Tozmmel Hossain Chowdhury | 26,937 | 23.6 | −9.6 |
| JI | M. A. Jabbar | 19,677 | 17.2 | +12.9 |
| JP(E) | Chowdhury Khurshid Alam | 6,294 | 5.5 | N/A |
| IOJ | Sams Uddin | 1,289 | 1.1 | N/A |
| Zaker Party | Gazi Amin Ullah | 322 | 0.3 | −0.3 |
| Gano Forum | Ruhul Amin Patwari | 240 | 0.2 | N/A |
| Pragotishi Jatiatabadi Dal (Nurul A Moula) | Md. Mamunur Rashid | 195 | 0.2 | N/A |
| Jatiya Samajtantrik Dal-JSD | Md. Rafiqul Haider | 191 | 0.2 | −3.8 |
| FP | Aziz Ullah Bhuiyan | 128 | 0.1 | N/A |
| Majority | | 32,117 | 28.1 | +7.8 |
| Turnout | | 114,327 | 62.2 | +32.8 |
| BNP hold | | | | |

==== Chittagong-1 ====
General Election June 1996: Chittagong-1
| Party | Candidate | Votes | % | ±% |
|---|---|---|---|---|
| BNP | Khaleda Zia | 66,336 | 48.2 | −4.2 |
| AL | Mosharraf Hossain | 62,043 | 45.1 | +7.5 |
| JI | Md. Badrul Alam | 6,102 | 4.4 | −3.9 |
| JP(E) | Ali Asfraf Chowdhury | 2,382 | 1.7 | N/A |
| CPB (M-L) | Dilip Barua | 511 | 0.4 | −0.8 |
| Bangladesh Muslim League (Jamir Ali) | M. A. Aziz | 199 | 0.1 | N/A |
| Zaker Party | Mohammad Nurul Gani | 129 | 0.1 | 0.0 |
| Majority | | 4,293 | 3.1 | −11.7 |
| Turnout | | 137,702 | 78.5 | +18.5 |
| BNP hold | | | | |

=== 2001 general election ===
Khaleda Zia stood for five seats in the 2001 general election: Bogra-6, Bogra-7, Khulna-2, Feni-1, and Lakshmipur-2. After winning all five, she chose to represent Bogra-6 and quit the other four.

==== Bogra-6 ====
General Election 2001: Bogra-6
| Party | Candidate | Votes | % | ±% |
|---|---|---|---|---|
| BNP | Khaleda Zia | 227,355 | 78.6 | |
| AL | Md. Mahbubul Alam | 54,777 | 18.9 | |
| Islamic Sashantantrik Andolan | A. N. M. Mamunur Rashid | 4,745 | 1.6 | |
| CPB | Md. Abdur Razzak | 1,513 | 0.5 | |
| BKA | Md. Safiqul Hasan | 467 | 0.2 | |
| Bangladesh Samajtantrik Dal (Basad-Khalekuzzaman) | Md. Saifuzzaman Tutul | 294 | 0.1 | |
| Jatiya Party (M) | Syed Akil Ahmed | 267 | 0.1 | |
| Majority | | 172,578 | 59.6 | |
| Turnout | | 289,418 | 76.4 | |
| BNP hold | | | | |

==== Bogra-7 ====
General Election 2001: Bogra-7
| Party | Candidate | Votes | % | ±% |
|---|---|---|---|---|
| BNP | Khaleda Zia | 147,522 | 79.0 | |
| AL | Kamrun Nahar Putul | 35,656 | 19.1 | |
| IJOF | Md. Abdul Malek Sarkar | 3,330 | 1.8 | |
| Bangladesh Samajtantrik Dal (Khalekuzzaman) | Shamsul Alam Dulu | 240 | 0.1 | |
| WPB | Md. Fahim Sultan Molla | 104 | 0.1 | |
| Majority | | 111,866 | 59.9 | |
| Turnout | | 186,852 | 83.2 | |
| BNP hold | | | | |

==== Khulna-2 ====
General Election 2001: Khulna-2
| Party | Candidate | Votes | % | ±% |
|---|---|---|---|---|
| BNP | Khaleda Zia | 91,819 | 57.8 | +10.9 |
| AL | Manjurul Imam | 62,021 | 39.0 | −0.3 |
| Independent | Mohammad Hossain Mukta | 2,282 | 1.4 | N/A |
| IJOF | Ferdous Khan | 1,790 | 1.1 | N/A |
| Independent | Tariqul Islam | 697 | 0.4 | N/A |
| Bangladesh Samajtantrik Dal (Basad-Khalekuzzaman) | Nurul Islam | 207 | 0.1 | N/A |
| Jatiya Party (M) | Syed Delowar Hossain | 96 | 0.1 | N/A |
| Majority | | 29,798 | 18.8 | +11.2 |
| Turnout | | 158,912 | 73.3 | −8.8 |
| BNP hold | | | | |

==== Lakshmipur-2 ====
General Election 2001: Lakshmipur-2
| Party | Candidate | Votes | % | ±% |
|---|---|---|---|---|
| BNP | Begum Khaleda Zia | 123,526 | 72.2 | +20.6 |
| AL | Harunur Rashid | 44,974 | 26.3 | +2.7 |
| IJOF | Abul Kashem Choyal | 1,251 | 0.7 | N/A |
| Gano Forum | Ruhul Amin Patwari | 438 | 0.3 | +0.1 |
| Independent | Md. Jasim Uddin | 175 | 0.1 | N/A |
| JSD | Rafiqul Haider Chowdhury | 165 | 0.1 | N/A |
| Independent | Md. Ruhul Amin | 159 | 0.1 | N/A |
| Independent | Md. Shahid Ulla | 141 | 0.1 | N/A |
| Jatiya Party (M) | Kazi Jamsed Kabir Bakki Billah | 126 | 0.1 | N/A |
| Independent | AHM Zaheer Hossain Hakim | 55 | 0.0 | N/A |
| Majority | | 78,552 | 45.9 | |
| Turnout | | 171,010 | 62.7 | |
| BNP hold | | | | |

==== Feni-1 ====
General Election 2001: Feni-1
| Party | Candidate | Votes | % | ±% |
|---|---|---|---|---|
| BNP | Khaleda Zia | 103,149 | 72.2 | +16.6 |
| AL | Zafar Imam | 36,763 | 25.7 | +5.1 |
| Independent | Fazlul Haq Chowdhury | 1,018 | 0.7 | N/A |
| IJOF | A. T. M. Golam Mawla Chowdhury | 688 | 0.5 | N/A |
| BIF | Ruhul Amin | 449 | 0.3 | +0.1 |
| BKA | Anowar Ullah Bhuiyan | 449 | 0.3 | +0.1 |
| Independent | Md. Redwan Ullah | 166 | 0.1 | N/A |
| Jatiya Party (M) | Salim Mohi Uddin | 162 | 0.1 | N/A |
| Majority | | 66,386 | 46.5 | +11.5 |
| Turnout | | 142,844 | 69.1 | −5.4 |
| BNP hold | | Swing | +10.85 | |

=== 2008 general election ===
Khaleda Zia stood for three seats in the 2008 general election: Bogra-6, Bogra-7, and Feni-1. After winning all three, she chose to represent Feni-1 and quit the other two.

==== Bogra-6 ====
General Election 2008: Bogra-6
| Party | Candidate | Votes | % | ±% |
|---|---|---|---|---|
| BNP | Khaleda Zia | 193,792 | 71.6 | −7.0 |
| AL | Momtaz Uddin | 74,634 | 27.6 | +8.7 |
| IAB | A. N. M. Mamunur Rashid | 1,336 | 0.5 | N/A |
| BDB | Abdullah al Woaky | 627 | 0.2 | N/A |
| BSD | Md. Saifuzzaman | 297 | 0.1 | N/A |
| Majority | | 119,158 | 44.0 | |
| Turnout | | 270,686 | 86.6 | |
| BNP hold | | | | |

==== Bogra-7 ====
General Election 2008: Bogra-7
| Party | Candidate | Votes | % | ±% |
|---|---|---|---|---|
| BNP | Khaleda Zia | 232,761 | 71.2 | |
| JP(E) | Altaf Ali | 92,833 | 28.4 | |
| BDB | Md. Mejbaul Alam | 918 | 0.3 | |
| BSD | Shamsul Alam Dulu | 446 | 0.1 | |
| Majority | | 139,928 | 42.8 | |
| Turnout | | 326,958 | 88.0 | |
| BNP hold | | | | |

==== Feni-1 ====
General Election 2008: Feni-1
| Party | Candidate | Votes | % | ±% |
|---|---|---|---|---|
| BNP | Khaleda Zia | 114,482 | 65.4 | −6.8 |
| AL | Faiz Ahmed | 58,551 | 33.4 | +7.7 |
| BDB | Mohalled Ilias Zakaria | 1,215 | 0.7 | |
| BIF | Mohammead Rafiqul Islam Patwari | 596 | 0.3 | |
| BSD | Rezaul Karim | 235 | 0.1 | |
| Majority | | 55,931 | 31.9 | |
| Turnout | | 175,079 | 78.7 | |
| BNP hold | | Swing | -7.25 | |
