= Munshi Rafiqul Alam =

Bangladesh Nationalist Party politician

Munshi Rafiqul Alam Maznu

Member of Parliament for Feni-1
- Incumbent
- Assumed office 17 February 2026
- Preceded by: Alauddin Ahmed Chowdhury

Personal details
- Born: Feni, Bangladesh
- Party: Bangladesh Nationalist Party

Munshi Rafiqul Alam Maznu is a Bangladesh Nationalist Party politician and current Jatiya Sangsad member from the Feni-1 constituency. He is currently serving as Dhaka Metropolitan South BNP convener. He was elected in 13th National Election of Bangladesh held in 2026. In Feni-1 (Fulgazi, Parashuram and Chhagalnaiya) constituency, BNP candidate Maznu was elected by securing 119,904 votes from a total of 121 polling stations. His nearest rival, Jamaat candidate SM Kamal Uddin, received 85,715 votes.
