= Middle Basura =

- Village
- Location in Bangladesh
- Coordinates: 23°8′59″N 91°25′0″E
- Country: Bangladesh
- Division: Chittagong Division
- District: Feni District
- Upazila: Fulgazi Upazila
- Time zone: UTC+6 (Bangladesh Time)

Middle Basura is a village at Fulgazi Upazilla, in Feni District in the Chittagong Division of south-eastern Bangladesh.
