= Basantapur, Feni =

Basantapur
- Village
- Location in Bangladesh
- Coordinates: 22°19′49.332″N 91°49′57.4536″E
- Country: Bangladesh
- Division: Chittagong Division
- District: Feni District
- Upazila: Fulgazi Upazila
- Time zone: UTC+6 (Bangladesh Time)

Basantapur is a village at Fulgazi Upazilla, in Feni District in the Chittagong Division of south-eastern Bangladesh.
