= Helaluzzaman Talukder Lalu =

Bangladeshi politician

Member of Parliament

Personal details
- Born: Bogra District
- Party: Bangladesh Nationalist Party

Helaluzzaman Talukder Lalu is a Bangladeshi politician and the former Member of Parliament from Bogra-7.

== Career ==
Lalu was elected to Parliament from Bogra-7 as a Bangladesh Nationalist Party candidate in 1991, 1996, 1996, and 2001. He was elected in by-elections which were called after Khaleda Zia won the seat but choose to represent another constituency in the parliament. He is an Advisory Council member of Bangladesh Nationalist Party.
