= Rezaul Karim Bablu =

Bangladeshi politician

- রেজাউল করিম বাবলু

Member of Parliament for Bogra-7 of 11th Jatiya Sangsad
- In office 30 January 2019 – 7 January 2024
- Preceded by: Altaf Ali
- Succeeded by: Mostafa Alam Nannu

Personal details
- Born: 13 November 1962 (age 63)
- Party: Independent

Rezaul Karim Bablu (born 13 November 1962) is a Bangladeshi politician and former Jatiya Sangsad member representing the Bogra-7 constituency.

== Early life and career ==
Bablu earned his H.S.C. degree. Bablu was elected to the parliament from Bogra-7 as an independent candidate, endorsed by the Bangladesh Nationalist Party, on 30 December 2018.

=== Controversy ===
In November 2020, on the Women and Children Repression Prevention (Amendment) Bill discussion, Bablu blamed feminists for the increase in rape incidents around Bangladesh.
