= Aminul Islam Sarker =

Bangladeshi politician

Member of Bangladesh Parliament

Personal details
- Party: Jatiya Party (Ershad)

Aminul Islam Sarker is a Jatiya Party (Ershad) politician and a former member of parliament for Bogra-7.

== Career ==
Sarker was elected to parliament from Bogra-7 as a Jatiya Party candidate in 1986 and 1988.
