= List of international prime ministerial trips made by Khaleda Zia =

The following is a list of international prime ministerial trips made by Khaleda Zia during her second term as Prime Minister of Bangladesh from 2001 to 2006, as well as visits made during her first term between 1991 to 1996.

== 1992 ==
Country	Areas Visited	Date(s)	Purpose(s)	Notes
United States	Washington DC	18-19 March	Private Visit	Zia met with President George H. W. Bush and asked for aid in the aftermath of 1991 Bangladesh cyclone.
India	New Delhi	26-28 May	State Visit	Zia visited India for the eighth South Asian Association for Regional Cooperation summit.
Pakistan	Islamabad	9-11 August	Official Visit	Zia visited Pakistan.

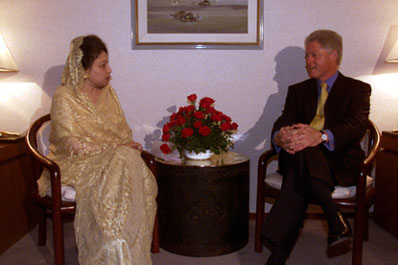
Khaleda Zia and US President Bill Clinton

== 1995 ==
Country	Areas Visited	Date(s)	Purpose(s)	Notes
Pakistan	Islamabad	2 March	State Visit	Zia visited Pakistan while serving as the chair of South Asian Association for Regional Cooperation.
Denmark	Copenhagen	11 March	State Visit	Zia attended the World Summit for social development.

== 2002 ==
Country	Areas Visited	Date(s)	Purpose(s)	Notes
China	Beijing	24 December	State Visit	Zia met Premier Zhu Rongji and expressed support for One China Policy.

== 2004 ==
Country	Areas Visited	Date(s)	Purpose(s)	Notes
Pakistan	Islamabad	3-6 January	State Visit	Zia visited Pakistan for the 12th South Asian Association for Regional Cooperation summit.
Indonesia	Jakarta	23-24 January	State Visit	Zia made a state visit with a large entourage of businessmen, including Abdul Awal Mintoo and Latifur Rahman.
Brunei	Bandar Seri Begawan	25-26 January	State Visit	Zia made a state visit with a large entourage of businessmen.

== 2005 ==
Country	Areas Visited	Date(s)	Purpose(s)	Notes
Singapore	Singapore	20-22 March	State Visit	Zia made a state visit to Singapore after being invited by Prime Minister of Singapore, Lee Hsien Loong.
Japan	Tokyo	12-15 July	State Visit	Zia visited Japan and held talks with Junichiro Koizumi.
China	Beijing	18 August	State Visit	Zia held talks at the Great Hall of the People with Prime Minister Wen Jiabao.
Saudi Arabia	Mecca	24 October-24 November	Umrah	Zia went to Mecca and Medina for Umrah, a Muslim pilgrimage.

== 2006 ==
Country	Areas Visited	Date(s)	Purpose(s)	Notes
Pakistan	Islamabad	12-14 February	State Visit	Zia visited Islamabad for the second time in her third term. She signed agreements on tourism, trade, and agriculture. She visited survivors of earthquakes in Pakistan.
India	New Delhi	20-22 March	State Visit	Zia made a state visit to India. She met Prime Minister Manmohan Singh and helped resolve some differences while differences regarding terrorism and trade remained.
Saudi Arabia	Riyadh	14-21 October	State Visit	Zia visited Saudi Arabia at the invitation of the Kingdom and met King Abdullah Bin Abdul Aziz Al Saud.
