= Morshed Milton =

Bangladeshi politician

- মোরসেদ মিলটন

Member of the Bangladesh Parliament for Bogra-7
- Incumbent
- Assumed office 17 February 2026
- Preceded by: Mostafa Alam Nannu

Personal details
- Party: Bangladesh Nationalist Party

Morshed Milton is a Bangladeshi politician and a Jatiya Sangsad member representing Bogra-7 constituency in 2026.
