= 7 Party Alliance =

Bangladeshi political coalition

7 Party Alliance ৭ দলীয় ঐক্যজোট
- Leader: Khaleda Zia
- Founded: 1983
- Dissolved: 1999
- Preceded by: Jatiyatabadi Front
- Succeeded by: Four Party Alliance
- Headquarters: Dhaka, Bangladesh
- Ideology: Bangladeshi nationalism Conservatism (Bangladeshi); Economic liberalism Anti-authoritarianism; Big tent
- Political position: Centre-right to right-wing
- Members: Bangladesh Nationalist Party (BNP); Jatiya Ganotantrik Party (JaGaPa); Progressive Nationalist Party (PNP); Bangladesh Muslim League; Democratic League; United Peoples Party; National Democratic Party

During the 1990s, leader of the BNP Khaleda Zia formed a coalition against Hussain Muhammad Ershad's military regime. 7 political parties joined Khaleda in this coalition.

== History ==
From 1983, Begum Khaleda Zia became the de facto leader of BNP. Under her leadership the BNP formed a new anti-government alliance against the Ershad's military regime. It was named after the number of parties with it, 7-Party Alliance. BNP launched a massive anti-government movement after co-ordination with Awami League led 15-Party Alliance from September 1983. In March 1986, Ershad declared that a national election would be held on 26 April. 7 party alliance and the left boycotted the election. Initially Awami League decided to boycott. But later participated in the election. The movement against Ershad started gaining growing from October 1990. The BNP led 7-party alliance, the Awami League led 8-party alliance and the Leftist 5-party alliance started a coordinated movement to over through Ershad from 10 October 1990 and declared a nationwide strike on that day. The strike claimed 5 lives, including the three BNP activists who were rallying in front of the central office of the Jatiya Party when the Jatiya Party cadres opened fire on the crowd. On 4 December, the mass uprising took place and Ershad declared his resignation.
