= Mostafa Alam Nannu =

Bangladeshi physician and politician

- মোস্তফা আলম

Member of the Bangladesh Parliament for Bogra-7
- In office 10 January 2024 – 6 August 2024
- Preceded by: Rezaul Karim Bablu
- Succeeded by: Morshed Milton

Personal details
- Born: 10 May 1955 (age 71)
- Education: Rajshahi Medical College

Mostafa Alam Nannu (born 10 May 1955) is a Bangladeshi physician and politician. He is a former Jatiya Sangsad member representing the Bogra-7 constituency in 2024.
