= Sayeed Eskander =

Bangladeshi politician (1953–2012)

- সাঈদ এস্কান্দার

Member of Parliament
- In office 1 October 2001 – 29 October 2006
- Preceded by: Khaleda Zia
- Succeeded by: Khaleda Zia
- Constituency: Feni-1

Personal details
- Born: 13 January 1953 Dinajpur, East Bengal, Pakistan
- Died: 23 September 2012 (aged 59) New York City, U.S.
- Party: Bangladesh Nationalist Party
- Spouse: Nasrin Eskander
- Relations: Khaleda Zia (sister); Ziaur Rahman (brother-in-law); Tarique Rahman (nephew)
- Children: 2
- Parent: Taiyaba Majumder (mother)
- Relatives: See Majumder–Zia family

Military service
- Allegiance: Bangladesh
- Branch/service: Bangladesh Army
- Years of service: 1975–1982
- Rank: Major
- Unit: East Bengal Regiment
- Commands: 2IC of 12th East Bengal Regiment; ADC to President

Sayeed Eskander (13 January 1953 – 23 September 2012) was a Bangladeshi politician and army major. He was a member of the Bangladeshi parliament from 2001 to 2006, representing the Bangladesh Nationalist Party from the Feni-1 constituency. He was the younger brother of former prime minister Khaleda Zia. Eskander was also the founding chairman of Islamic Television.

== Early life ==
Sayeed Iskander was born on 13 January 1953 in Dinajpur. He belonged to a Bengali Muslim family with origins in Fulgazi, Feni District. He was the son of tea businessman Iskandar Ali Majumder, who was in turn the son of Salamat Ali Majumdar, who was the son of Azgar Ali Majumdar, who was the son of Nahar Muhammad Khan, who was the son of Murad Khan, a 16th-century Pashtun immigrant. His mother, Taiyaba Majumder, was from Chandbari (now in Uttar Dinajpur District).

During his time as a student in 1969, Iskander was the general secretary of the Dinajpur unit of the Bangladesh Students Union. He went on to become the vice president of the Central Committee of the Students Union.

== Career ==
He joined the Bangladesh Army in 1975. He retired from the army in 1982 with the rank of major.

Iskander then joined the Bangladesh Nationalist Party, a political party founded by his brother-in-law, President Ziaur Rahman. After his elder sister Khaleda Zia gave up her seat at the Feni-1 constituency, Iskander competed in a by-election in November 2001 and successfully won a seat in parliament.

== Death ==
He died from lung cancer on 23 September 2012 in New York, United States. He was buried in Banani Military Graveyard.
