= Shirin Akhter =

Bangladeshi politician

- শিরীন আখতার
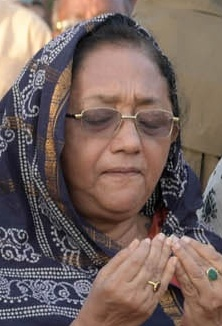
- Akhter in 2018

Member of Parliament (Bangladesh)
- In office 29 January 2014 – 29 January 2024
- Preceded by: Khaleda Zia
- Succeeded by: Alauddin Ahmed Chowdhury

Personal details
- Born: 12 April 1954 (age 72)
- Party: Jatiya Samajtantrik Dal
- Education: Dhaka University (B.Sc)
- Occupation: Politician, social worker

Shirin Akhter (born 12 April 1954) is a Bangladeshi politician, general secretary of Jatiya Samajtantrik Dal and former Jatiya Sangsad member who represented the Feni-1 constituency from January 2014 to January 2024.

== Career ==
Akhter is the general secretary of Jatiya Samajtantrik Dal, the faction led by Hasanul Haq Inu. Inu is a former information minister of Bangladesh. Inu appointed her the general secretary of the party on 12 March 2016. The party then split in two over opposition to her appointment by some party members. The rebel faction was led by Sharif Nurul Ambia and Moinuddin Khan Badal. After a hearing Bangladesh Election Commission recognized the faction led by Inu and Shirin as the mainstream fraction of the party. She was elected unopposed to the Jatiya Sangsad in 2014. She has called for greater recognition of work done by women in rural areas of Bangladesh. On 26 December 2016, she and Inu led a delegation of Jatiya Samajtantrik Dal to meet with the President of Bangladesh Abdul Hamid in the Bangabhaban, to recommend the next chief election commissioner of Bangladesh Election Commission who will oversee the next Bangladeshi general election.
