= Altaf Ali =

Bangladeshi politician

- আলতাফ আলী

Member of the Bangladesh Parliament for Bogra-7
- In office 29 January 2014 – 29 January 2019
- Preceded by: Moudud Ahmed
- Succeeded by: Rezaul Karim Bablu

Personal details
- Born: 30 June 1944 (age 82)
- Party: Jatiya Party

Altaf Ali (born 30 June 1944) is a Bangladeshi politician and a former Jatiya Sangsad member representing the Bogra-7 constituency.

== Early life ==
Ali has a law degree and a bachelor's and master's degree in communication.

== Career ==
Ali was elected to parliament from Bogra-7 as a Jatiya Party candidate in 2014.
