= Bogra-7 =

Constituency of Bangladesh's Jatiya Sangsad

Coordinates: 24.88°N 89.45°E

- Constituency for the Jatiya Sangsad
- District: Bogra District
- Division: Rajshahi Division
- Electorate: 538,092 (2026)

Current constituency
- Created: 1973
- Party: Bangladesh Nationalist Party
- Member: Morshed Milton
- ← 41 Bogra-6 43 Chapai Nawabganj-1 →

Bogra-7 is a constituency represented in the Jatiya Sangsad (National Parliament) of Bangladesh since 2026 by Morshed Milton of the Bangladesh Nationalist Party.

== Boundaries ==
The constituency encompasses Gabtali and Shajahanpur upazilas.

== History ==
The constituency was created for the first general elections in newly independent Bangladesh, held in 1973.

Ahead of the 2008 general election, the Election Commission redrew constituency boundaries to reflect population changes revealed by the 2001 Bangladesh census. The 2008 redistricting altered the boundaries of the constituency.

== Members of Parliament ==
Election	Member	Party
1973	Amanullah Khan	Awami League
1979	Habibur Rahman	Bangladesh Nationalist Party
Major Boundary Changes
1986	Aminul Islam Sarker	Jatiya Party
Sep 1991 by-election	Helaluzzaman Talukder Lalu	Bangladesh Nationalist Party
Sep 1996 by-election	Helaluzzaman Talukder Lalu	Bangladesh Nationalist Party
Nov 2001 by-election	Helaluzzaman Talukder Lalu	Bangladesh Nationalist Party
Apr 2009 by-election	Moudud Ahmed	Bangladesh Nationalist Party
2014	Altaf Ali	Jatiya Party (Ershad)
2018	Rezaul Karim Bablu	Independent
2024	Mostafa Alam Nannu	Awami League
2026	Morshed Milton	Bangladesh Nationalist Party

== Elections ==
=== Elections in the 2020s ===
General election 2026: Bogra-7
Party	Candidate	Votes	%	±%
BNP	Morshed Milton			
Jamaat	Md. Golam Rabbani			
IAB	Md. Shafiqul Islam			
BML	Md. Ansar Ali			
Majority				
Turnout				

=== Elections in the 2010s ===
General Election 2014: Bogra-7
Party	Candidate	Votes	%	±%
JP(E)	Altaf Ali	17,879	63.9	+35.5
Jatiya Party (M)	ATM Aminul Islam	10,104	36.1	N/A
Majority		7,775	27.8	−15.0
Turnout		27,983	6.6	−81.4
JP(E) gain from BNP				

=== Elections in the 2000s ===
Khaleda Zia stood for three seats in the 2008 general election: Bogra-6, Bogra-7, and Feni-1. After winning all three, she chose to represent Feni-1 and quit the other two, triggering by-elections in them. Moudud Ahmed of the BNP was elected in an April 2009 by-election.

General Election 2008: Bogra-7
Party	Candidate	Votes	%	±%
BNP	Khaleda Zia	232,761	71.2	−7.8
JP(E)	Altaf Ali	92,833	28.4	+11.4
BDB	Md. Mejbaul Alam	918	0.3	N/A
BSD	Shamsul Alam Dulu	446	0.1	N/A
Majority		139,928	42.8	−12.3
Turnout		326,958	88.0	+8.5
BNP hold				

Khaleda Zia stood for five seats in the 2001 general election: Bogra-6, Bogra-7, Khulna-2, Feni-1, and Lakshmipur-2. After winning all five, she chose to represent Bogra-6 and quit the other four, triggering by-elections in them. Helaluzzaman Talukder Lalu of the BNP was elected in a November 2001 by-election.

General Election 2001: Bogra-7
Party	Candidate	Votes	%	±%
BNP	Khaleda Zia	147,522	79.0	+6.9
AL	Kamrun Nahar Putul	35,656	19.1	+2.1
IJOF	Md. Abdul Malek Sarkar	3,330	1.8	N/A
BSD	Shamsul Alam Dulu	240	0.1	N/A
Majority		111,866	59.9	+4.8
Turnout		186,852	83.2	+3.7
BNP hold				

=== Elections in the 1990s ===
Khaleda Zia stood for five seats in the June 1996 general election: Bogra-6, Bogra-7, Feni-1, Lakshmipur-2 and Chittagong-1. After winning all five, she chose to represent Feni-1 and quit the other four, triggering by-elections in them. Helaluzzaman Talukder Lalu was elected in a September 1996 by-election.

General Election June 1996: Bogra-7
Party	Candidate	Votes	%	±%
BNP	Khaleda Zia	107,417	72.1	+5.2
AL	Md. Waliul Haque	25,278	17.0	−2.7
Jamaat	Md. Fazle Rabbi	15,678	10.5	−1.8
Independent	A. B. M. Sirazul Islam	271	0.2	N/A
Majority		82,139	55.1	+8.0
Turnout		149,021	79.5	+12.7
BNP hold				

Khaleda Zia stood for five seats in the 1991 general election: Bogra-7, Dhaka-5, Dhaka-9, Feni-1, and Chittagong-8. After winning all five, she chose to represent Feni-1 and quit the other four, triggering by-elections in them. Helaluzzaman Talukder Lalu of the BNP was elected in a September 1991 by-election.

General Election 1991: Bogra-7
Party	Candidate	Votes	%	±%
BNP	Khaleda Zia	83,854	66.9	N/A
AL	TM Musa Pesta	24,760	19.7	N/A
Jamaat	Zamat Ali Prang	15,440	12.3	N/A
WPB	Saleha Khatun	748	0.6	N/A
JP(E)	Aminul Islam	355	0.3	N/A
Majority		59,094	47.1	N/A
Turnout		125,379	66.8	N/A
BNP gain from JP(E)				
