= Feni-1 =

Constituency of Bangladesh's Jatiya Sangsad

Coordinates: 23.04°N 91.52°E

- Constituency for the Jatiya Sangsad
- District: Feni District
- Division: Chittagong Division
- Electorate: 385,652 (2026)

Current constituency
- Created: 1984
- Party: Bangladesh Nationalist Party
- Member: Rafiqul Alam Majnu
- ← 264 Chandpur-5 266 Feni-2 →

Feni-1 is a constituency represented in the Jatiya Sangsad (National Parliament) of Bangladesh since 2026 by Rafiqul Alam Majnu of the Bangladesh Nationalist Party.

== Boundaries ==
The constituency encompasses Chhagalnaiya, Fulgazi, and Parshuram upazilas.

== History ==
The constituency was created in 1984 from the Noakhali-1 constituency when the former Noakhali District was split into three districts: Feni, Noakhali, and Lakshmipur.

== Members of Parliament ==
Election	Member	Party
1986	Zafar Imam	Jatiya Party
1988	Zafar Imam	Jatiya Party
1991	Khaleda Zia	Bangladesh Nationalist Party
Feb 1996	Khaleda Zia	Bangladesh Nationalist Party
Jun 1996	Khaleda Zia	Bangladesh Nationalist Party
2001	Khaleda Zia	Bangladesh Nationalist Party
2001 by-election	Sayeed Eskander	Bangladesh Nationalist Party
2008	Khaleda Zia	Bangladesh Nationalist Party
2014	Shirin Akhter	Jatiya Samajtantrik Dal
2018	Shirin Akhter	Jatiya Samajtantrik Dal
2024	Alauddin Ahmed Chowdhury Nasim	Awami League
2026	Rafiqul Alam Majnu	Bangladesh Nationalist Party

== Elections ==
=== Elections in the 2020s ===
General election 2026: Feni-1
Party	Candidate	Votes	%	±%
BNP	Rafiqul Alam Majnu			
Jamaat	S. M. Kamal Uddin	85,615		
IAB	Kazi Golam Kibria			
JP(E)	Motaher Hossain Chowdhury			
BKA	Anwarullah Bhuiyan			
BCP	Md. Firoz Uddin Chowdhury			
BML	Mahbub Morshed Majumder			
Majority				
Turnout				
Registered electors		385,652		
BNP gain from AL				

=== Elections in the 2010s ===
Shirin Akhter was elected unopposed in the 2014 general election after opposition parties withdrew their candidacies in a boycott of the election.

=== Elections in the 2000s ===
General Election 2008: Feni-1
Party	Candidate	Votes	%	±%
BNP	Khaleda Zia	114,482	65.4	−6.8
AL	Faiz Ahmed	58,551	33.4	+7.7
BDB	Mohalled Ilias Zakaria	1,215	0.7	N/A
BIF	Mohammed Rafiqul Islam	596	0.3	N/A
BSD	Rezaul Karim	235	0.1	N/A
Majority		55,931	31.9	−14.6
Turnout		175,079	78.7	+9.6
BNP hold				

Khaleda Zia stood for five seats in the 2001 general election: Bogra-6, Bogra-7, Khulna-2, Feni-1, and Lakshmipur-2. After winning all five, she chose to represent Bogra-6 and quit the other four, triggering by-elections in them. Sayeed Iskander, her brother, was elected in a November 2001 by-election.

General Election 2001: Feni-1
Party	Candidate	Votes	%	±%
BNP	Khaleda Zia	103,149	72.2	+16.6
AL	Zafar Imam	36,763	25.7	+5.1
Independent	Fazlul Haq Chowdhury	1,018	0.7	N/A
IJOF	A. T. M. Golam Mawla Chowdhury	688	0.5	N/A
BIF	Ruhul Amin	449	0.3	+0.1
BKA	Anowar Ullah Bhuiyan	449	0.3	+0.1
Independent	Md. Redwan Ullah	166	0.1	N/A
Jatiya Party (M)	Salim Mohi Uddin	162	0.1	N/A
Majority		66,386	46.5	+11.5
Turnout		142,844	69.1	−5.4
BNP hold				

=== Elections in the 1990s ===
General Election June 1996: Feni-1
Party	Candidate	Votes	%	±%
BNP	Khaleda Zia	65,086	55.6	+16.9
AL	M. Wazi. Ullah Bhuiyan	24,138	20.6	−4.1
JP(E)	Zafar Imam	15,897	13.6	−10.4
Jamaat	Md. Yunus	8,480	7.2	−1.5
IOJ	Habibur Rahman	1,758	1.5	N/A
Pragotishi Jatiatabadi Dal (Nurul A Moula)	A. T. M. Golam Mawla Chowdhury	385	0.3	−0.2
Zaker Party	Abdul Kalam Majumder	300	0.3	−0.2
BKA	Anowar Ullah Bhuiyan	289	0.2	−0.2
Jatiya Samajtantrik Dal-JSD	Joinal Abedin	265	0.2	−0.2
BIF	Ruhul Amin	265	0.2	N/A
Bangladesh Samyabadi Dal (Marxist-Leninist)	Safiqur Rahman Majumder	156	0.1	N/A
Gano Forum	Qazi Faruk	133	0.1	N/A
Majority		40,948	35.0	+21.1
Turnout		117,152	74.5	+29.1
BNP hold				

General Election 1991: Feni-1
Party	Candidate	Votes	%	±%
BNP	Khaleda Zia	36,375	38.7	
AL	Md. Zakaria Bhuiyan	23,250	24.7	
JP(E)	Zafar Imam	22,601	24.0	
Jamaat	Md. Yunus	8,163	8.7	
JSD	Shirin Akhter	1,245	1.3	
NAP (Muzaffar)	Mujibul Haq	782	0.8	
Pragotishi Jatiatabadi Dal (Nurul A Moula)	A. T. M. Golam Mawla Chowdhury	517	0.5	
Zaker Party	Abul Kalam	452	0.5	
BKA	Anwar Ullah	367	0.4	
Jatiya Samajtantrik Dal-JSD	Mir Abdul Hannan	351	0.4	
Majority		13,125	13.9	
Turnout		94,103	45.4	
BNP gain from AL				
