= Taiyaba Majumder =

Bangladeshi award recipient

- তৈয়বা মজুমদার
- Born: 18 January 1921
- Died: 18 January 2008 (aged 87)
- Known for: Mother of Begum Khaleda Zia, former prime minister of Bangladesh
- Spouse: Iskander Majumdar
- Children: Selima; Khaleda; Khurshida; Sayeed; Shamim
- Relatives: See Majumder–Zia family
- Awards: Begum Rokeya Padak

Taiyaba Majumder (18 January 1921 – 18 January 2008) was a Bangladeshi housewife and recipient of the Begum Rokeya Padak. She was the mother of former Prime Minister as well opposition leader of Bangladesh and B.N.P. Chairperson Begum Khaleda Zia, former minister Khurshid Jahan (1939–2006), politician Sayeed Iskander (1953–2012), Selima Islam and Shamim Iskander.

== Biography ==
Taiyaba Majumder was married to a businessman named Iskandar Majumder. They lived in Dinajpur District but her husband was originally from Feni district, East Bengal. They had two daughters, Khaleda Zia and Khurshid Jahan, and two sons including, Sayeed Iskander. Her daughter Khaleda Zia, married Major Ziaur Rahman. Ziaur Rahman would go on to become the chief of Bangladesh Army and then the President of Bangladesh and Khaleda Zia would become the first lady. After the death of Ziaur Rahman. Khaleda Zia became the chairperson of Bangladesh Nationalist party and was elected Prime Minister of Bangladesh multiple times.

On 25 January 2004 she was awarded the Begum Rokeya Padak by the government of Bangladesh, her awarded was handed to her by President of Bangladesh Iajuddin Ahmed. She was given the award for contribution to women's right and economic development in Bangladesh

She died on 18 January 2008 at the age of 87 in Dinazpur.

On 18 June 2013, Bangladesh Awami League member of parliament Nazma Akhtar used derogatory comments about her and questioned her religion in parliament which resulted in the Bangladesh Nationalist Party's members of parliament walking out of the parliament in protest.
