= Alauddin Ahmed Chowdhury =

Bangladeshi politician

Alauddin Ahmed Chowdhury Nasim
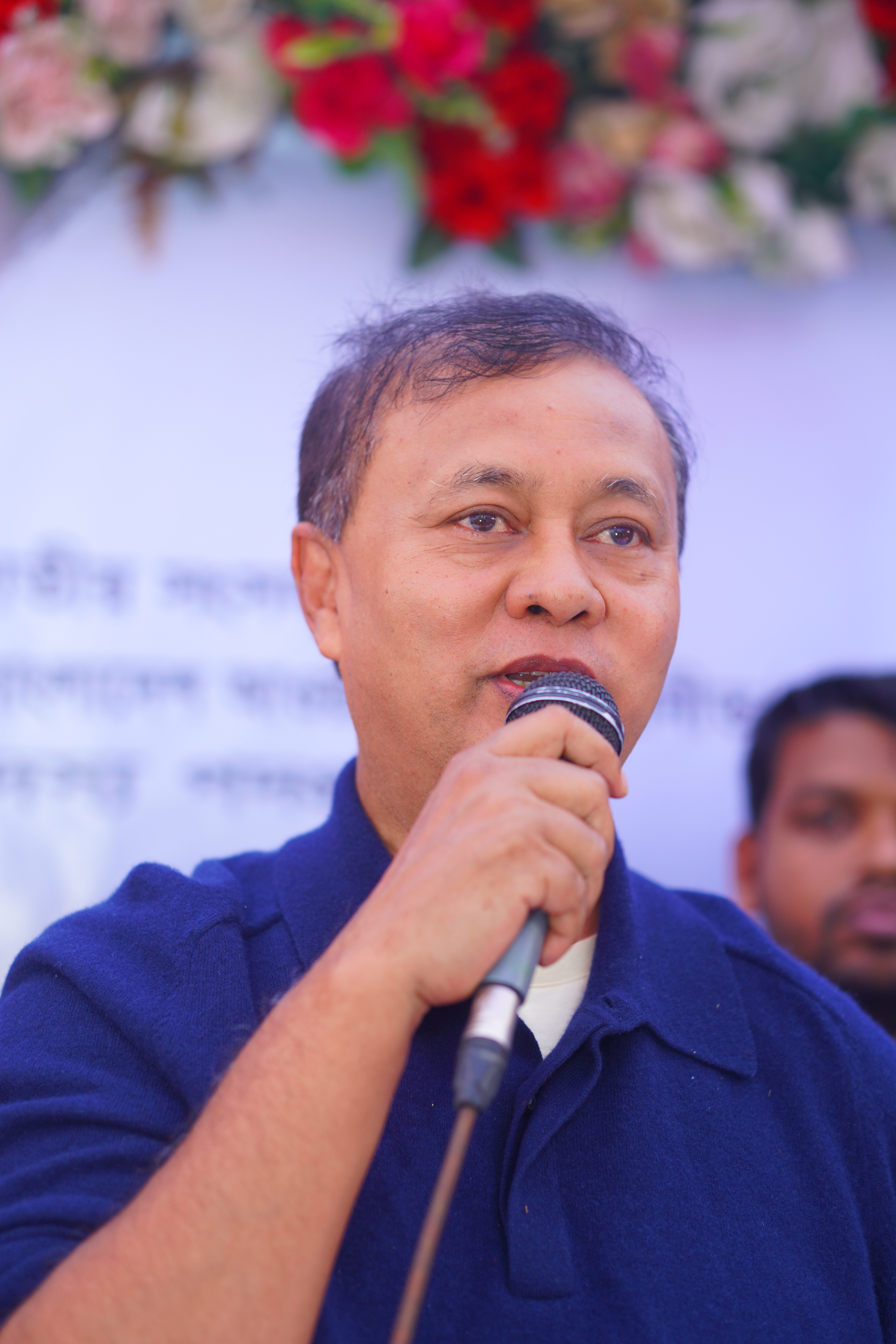
- Nasim in 2023

Member of the Bangladesh Parliament for Feni-1
- In office 30 January 2024 – 6 August 2024
- Preceded by: Shirin Akhter

Personal details
- Born: 7 November 1961 (age 64)
- Party: Bangladesh Awami League
- Occupation: Politician

Alauddin Ahmed Chowdhury Nasim (born 7 November 1961) is a Bangladesh Awami League politician and a former Jatiya Sangsad member representing the Feni-1 constituency in 2024.

== Early life ==
Alauddin Ahmed Chowdhury Nasim was born on 7 November 1961 to Saleh Uddin Ahmed Chowdhury and Hosneara Begum Rani Chowdhury in Parashuram, Feni. He passed secondary from Guthuma Khan Bahadur Abdul Aziz High School in 1977 and higher secondary from Chittagong College in 1979. He graduated (honours) from the Social Science Department of Chittagong University in 1983 and completed a post graduate degree in 1984. He served as the president of the Bangladesh Chhatra League Chittagong University unit from 1984 to 1986. Later he joined the administration cadre of the Bangladesh Civil Service. In 2008, he took voluntary retirement while holding the post of deputy secretary and concentrated on various business ventures.

Following the fall of the Sheikh Hasina led Awami League government, Chowdhury's home in Feni was burned down and vandalized in February 2025.

== Career ==
Nasim served as the deputy secretary (OSD) of the Establishment Ministry and an assistant personal secretary to the then prime minister, Sheikh Hasina, until 2007.
