= Khaleda Zia =

Prime Minister of Bangladesh (1991–1996; 2001–2006)

Begum Khaleda Zia
- খালেদা জিয়া
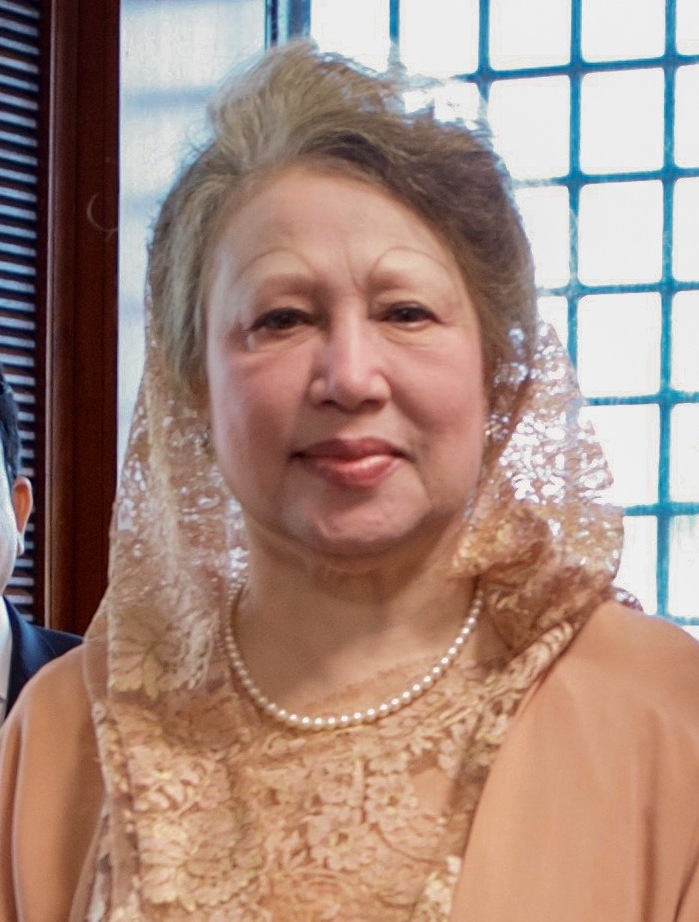
- Khaleda in 2016

Prime Minister of Bangladesh
- In office 10 October 2001 – 29 October 2006
- President: Shahabuddin Ahmed; Badruddoza Chowdhury; Iajuddin Ahmed
- Preceded by: Latifur Rahman (as Chief Adviser)
- Succeeded by: Iajuddin Ahmed (as Chief Adviser)
- In office 20 March 1991 – 30 March 1996
- President: Shahabuddin Ahmed; Abdur Rahman Biswas
- Preceded by: Kazi Zafar Ahmed
- Succeeded by: Muhammad Habibur Rahman (as Chief Adviser)

Chairperson of the Bangladesh Nationalist Party
- In office 10 May 1984 – 30 December 2025
- Secretary: Mustafizur Rahman; KM Obaidur Rahman; Abdus Salam Talukder; Abdul Mannan Bhuiyan; Khandaker Delwar Hossain; Mirza Fakhrul Islam Alamgir
- Preceded by: Abdus Sattar
- Succeeded by: Tarique Rahman

4th Leader of the Opposition
- In office 29 December 2008 – 9 January 2014
- Prime Minister: Sheikh Hasina
- Preceded by: Sheikh Hasina
- Succeeded by: Rowshan Ershad
- In office 23 June 1996 – 15 July 2001
- Prime Minister: Sheikh Hasina
- Preceded by: Sheikh Hasina
- Succeeded by: Sheikh Hasina

First Lady of Bangladesh
- In role 21 April 1977 – 30 May 1981
- President: Ziaur Rahman
- Preceded by: Khodeza Begum
- Succeeded by: Rowshan Ershad

Member of Parliament
- In office 29 December 2008 – 9 January 2014
- Preceded by: Sayeed Iskander
- Succeeded by: Shirin Akhter
- Constituency: Feni-1
- In office 1 October 2001 – 29 October 2006
- Preceded by: Zafar Imam
- Succeeded by: Muhammad Jamiruddin Sircar
- Constituency: Bogra-6
- In office 20 March 1991 – 15 July 2001
- Preceded by: Zafar Imam
- Succeeded by: Sayeed Iskander
- Constituency: Feni-1

Personal details
- Born: Khaleda Khanam; 15 August 1946 (Note: See Birth date discrepancy) Jalpaiguri, Bengal Province, British India
- Died: 30 December 2025 (aged 79) Dhaka, Bangladesh
- Resting place: Mausoleum of Ziaur Rahman; 23.7667°N 90.3782°E
- Citizenship: British India (1946–1947); India (1947–1950); Pakistan (1950–1971); Bangladesh (1971–2025)
- Party: Bangladesh Nationalist Party
- Other political affiliations: 7 Party Alliance (1983–1999); Four Party Alliance (1999–2012); 18 Party Alliance (2012–2022); Jatiya Oikya Front (2018–2022)
- Spouse: Ziaur Rahman (m. 1960; died 1981)
- Children: Tarique; Arafat
- Parent(s): Iskander Majumdar (father); Taiyaba Majumder (mother)
- Relatives: See Majumder–Zia family
- Awards: Independence Award (2026); Full list
- Nickname: Putul

Begum Khaleda Zia (Note: Bengali: বেগম খালেদা জিয়া, romanized: Bēgôm Khālēdā Jiẏā, pronounced [beɡom kʰaleda dʒija]) (born Khaleda Khanam; (Note: Bengali: খালেদা খানম, romanized: Khālēdā Khānôm, Bengali pronunciation: [kʰaleda kʰanom]) (Note: Nicknamed Putul (Bengali: পুতুল, pronounced [putul])) 15 August 1946 – 30 December 2025) was a Bangladeshi politician who twice served as prime minister of Bangladesh, from 1991 to 1996 and again from 2001 to 2006. She was the first female prime minister of Bangladesh and the second female prime minister in the Muslim world after Benazir Bhutto. She was the wife of the former president of Bangladesh and army chief, Ziaur Rahman and was first lady from 1977 to 1981. She was the longest serving chairperson of the Bangladesh Nationalist Party (BNP) from 1984 until her death in 2025.

Zia was born into a Bengali Muslim family in 1946 in Jalpaiguri and moved to East Bengal, present-day Bangladesh, in 1950. During the Liberation War of Bangladesh, after her husband joined the Mukti Bahini, she, along with her sons, was detained by the Pakistani Forces. She was the First Lady of Bangladesh from 1977 until her husband's assassination in 1981. Afterwards, Zia became active in politics and became the leader of the BNP in 1984. She and her party played a leading role in the pro-democracy movement against Hussain Muhammad Ershad. They boycotted the 1986 and 1988 general elections, thus securing for her the reputation of an "uncompromising leader". She, along with Sheikh Hasina of the Awami League, helped lead the 1990 mass uprising.

Zia's first premiership followed the BNP victory in the 1991 general election and saw the introduction of educational, economic, and administrative reforms. Her party also formed a short-lived government after the controversial February 1996 general election, which was boycotted by the opposition. During her second premiership, which began with her party's victory in the 2001 general election and lasted until 2006, Bangladesh witnessed growth in GDP, foreign investment and female literacy, as well as becoming the most corrupt country in the world according to the Corruption Perceptions Index.

Her second premiership concluded during a political crisis that resulted in a military takeover in 2007. The military-backed caretaker government charged and detained Zia and her two sons with corruption. Following the defeat of the BNP in the 2008 election by Sheikh Hasina's Awami League, she was driven out of her house; she boycotted the 2014 general election. In 2018, Zia was sentenced to a total of 17 years in prison for corruption. However, following the July Uprising in 2024, she was released and acquitted of all charges. After years of prolonged illness, Zia died on 30 December 2025 in a hospital and was given a state funeral.

== Background ==
=== Early life and education ===
Khaleda Khanam "Putul" was born in 1946 in Jalpaiguri in Bengal Province, British India (now in West Bengal, India) to a Bengali family of Muslim Majumdars from Fulgazi, Feni. She was the third of five children of her father Iskandar Ali Majumder, (Note: Also referred to as Iskandar Miyan or Muhammad Iskandar.) the great-grandson of the Bengali warlord Ghazi Nahar Muhammad Khan, who was conferred with the title of Majumdar by Maharaja Lakshman Manikya of the Twipra Kingdom. Zia's mother Taiyaba Majumder was originally from Chandbari village in Itahar, Dinajpur (present-day Uttar Dinajpur, West Bengal, India). Iskandar worked as a broker at the Das and Co., a banking and shareholder company involved in the local tea business, according to Nilanjan Dasgupta, the son of the company owner. According to the BBC Bangla, her family migrated to Dinajpur in East Bengal, Pakistan after the communal riots in Jalpaiguri in 1950.

Khaleda described herself as "self-educated", and there are no records of her graduating from high school. Initially, she attended Dinajpur Missionary School and later Dinajpur Girls' School, but dropped out after marriage.

In 1960, she married Ziaur Rahman, then a captain in the Pakistan Army. After marriage, she changed her name to Khaleda Zia by taking her husband's name as her surname. She reportedly enrolled in Surendranath College in Dinajpur but moved to West Pakistan to stay with her husband in 1965. Her husband was deployed as an army officer during the Indo-Pakistani War of 1965. In March 1969, the couple shifted back to East Pakistan. Due to Ziaur Rahman's posting in the army, the family then moved to Chittagong.

=== Birth date discrepancy ===
Zia claimed 15 August as her birthday, which was a matter of controversy in Bangladeshi politics. 15 August was the day many immediate family members of Zia's political rival, Sheikh Hasina's father, Sheikh Mujibur Rahman, were killed, in 1975. As a result of the deaths, 15 August was officially declared National Mourning Day of Bangladesh during the Hasina regime.

None of Zia's government-issued identification documents show her birthday on 15 August. Her matriculation examination certificate lists a birth date of 9 August 1945. Her marriage certificate lists 5 September 1945. Zia's passport indicates a birth date of 5 August 1946. Kader Siddiqui, a political ally of Zia, urged her not to celebrate her birthday on 15 August. The High Court filed a petition against Zia on this issue. In 2016, Gazi Zahirul Islam, the former joint general secretary of the Dhaka Union of Journalists, filed a case against Zia over her birthdate, accusing her of seeking to tarnish the reputation of Sheikh Mujibur Rahman and family. However, she was acquitted in 2024.

=== Family ===
Zia's first son, Tarique Rahman (born 1965), is the current prime minister of Bangladesh and the chairman of the Bangladesh Nationalist Party, after being elected in the 2026 general election. Her second son, Arafat Rahman (1969–2015) was a prominent sports organizer in the country. Zia's sister, Khurshid Jahan (1939–2006), served as the Minister of Women and Children Affairs during 2001–2006. Her younger brother, Sayeed Iskander (1953–2012), was also a politician who served as a Jatiya Sangsad member from the Feni-1 constituency during 2001–2006. Her second brother, Shamim Iskandar, is a retired flight engineer of Biman Bangladesh Airlines. Her second sister is Selina Islam.

== Bangladesh Liberation War ==
Following the beginning of the Liberation War, Zia arrived in Dhaka from Chittagong on 16 May 1971. She arrived by launch in Narayanganj in the evening with her two children, Tarique and Arafat, and the wife of Colonel Mahfuz. From there, her elder sister, Khurshid Jahan, and her sister's husband, Mozammel Haque, took them to their house in Khilgaon, Dhaka, in a jeep. On 26 May, her brother-in-law, Mozammel, learned that the Pakistani soldiers had found out about her location. Mozammel relocated Zia and her two sons to another place on 28 May, and they moved again on 3 June. Then, from an unknown address, Zia started living in the Siddheshwari house of SK Abdullah, deputy director of the Geological Survey Department. She remained in that house until she was arrested by the Pakistani Forces on the morning of 2 July.

After her arrest, Zia and her two children were kept in a room in the old Parliament building. From there, they were taken to a house inside the Dhaka Cantonment. On 21 August 1971, Ziaur Rahman wrote a letter about his wife. The then Pakistani Army Major General Jamshed Gulzar Kiani was in GHQ Dhaka of the Eastern Command, by whom she was detained. When Ziaur Rahman was working in the Punjab Regiment of West Pakistan, Jamshed was his commander. Zia's letter was posted by Shafaat Jamil from the "occupied" area and reached Maj. Gen. Jamshed.

Zia was detained until the first week of December 1971. She was released on the morning of 16 December, the day when the Pakistani Forces surrendered and the war ended. Subsequently, Zia and her two sons were taken by plane from Dhaka to Shamshernagar in Sylhet. Commander of the joint forces of the Mukti Bahini and the Mitro Bahini (India) Gen. Jagjit Singh Aurora made the arrangements at the request of Ziaur Rahman. Maj. Chowdhury Khalequzzaman and Capt. Oli Ahmad received them at the Shamshernagar airport and took them to a local rest house. After a very short time in Shamshernagar, Zia and their two sons went to Comilla Cantonment with Ziaur Rahman.

== Early political career ==
=== First Lady of Bangladesh ===
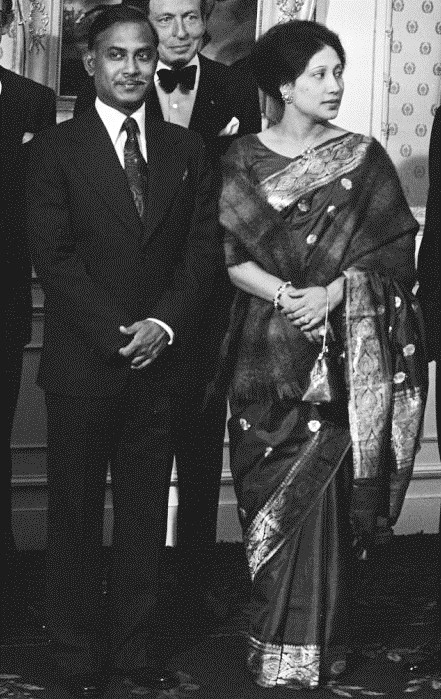
Zia as the First Lady of Bangladesh with her husband Ziaur Rahman in a state visit to the Netherlands, 1979

In 1977, Ziaur Rahman became the country's president, with Zia serving has first lady. On 30 May 1981, he was assassinated by members of the Bangladesh Army as part of a failed coup d'état. After his death, on 2 January 1982, she got involved in politics by first becoming a member of the BNP – the party that had been founded by Ziaur Rahman.

=== Anti-Ershad movement ===
In March 1982, the then chief of the Bangladesh Army, Lieutenant General Hussain Muhammad Ershad, launched a coup against President Abdus Sattar and became the Chief Martial Law Administrator (CMLA) of the country. This marked the beginning of an eight-year-long authoritarian regime in Bangladesh. Zia, from the first day of Ershad's rule, protested military rule.

Zia became the senior vice-president of the BNP by May 1983. Under her leadership, the BNP started discussing the possibilities of a unified movement with six other parties on 12 August 1983 and formed a 7-party alliance by the first week of September 1983. The BNP, led by Zia, also reached an action-based agreement with other political parties to launch a movement against Ershad.

On 30 September 1983, Zia led the first major public rally in front of the party office and was hailed by the party workers. On 28 November 1983, she took part in the gherao movement encircling the Secretariat building at Dhaka along with the alliance leaders, which was quelled by the police. Zia was put under house arrest on the same day.

==== Chairperson of the BNP ====
Due to his deteriorating health, Abdus Sattar resigned from the position of BNP chairman on 13 January 1984 and was replaced by Zia. In May 1984, she was elected as the chairperson of the party in a party council. After assuming the position of party chief, Zia spearheaded the movement against Ershad. In 1984, along with other parties, she declared 6 February as the "Demand Day" and 14 February as "Protest Day". Countrywide rallies were organized on those days, and activists of the movement died on the streets.

The 7-party alliance held a countrywide "Mass Resistance Day" on 9 July 1984. In support of their demand for the immediate withdrawal of martial law, the opposition forces called for a countrywide gherao and demonstrations from 16 to 20 September and a full-day hartal on 27 September 1984. The protests continued in 1985 as well and, as a result, in March of the same year, the Ershad-led government tightened the martial law and put Zia under house arrest again.

==== Boycotting the 1986 election ====
In 1986, Ershad declared a date for a fresh general election. Initially, the two major opposition alliances, the 7-party alliance led by the BNP and the 15-party alliance led by the Awami League, discussed the possibilities of participating in the election, forming a greater election alliance to catch Ershad off guard. However, the Awami League refused to form any election alliance, and Sheikh Hasina, the leader of the party, in a public rally on 19 March 1986, declared that anyone who would join the election under Ershad would be a "national traitor".

Despite this, Sheikh Hasina's Awami League, along with the Communist Party and six other parties, joined the election under Ershad, resulting in a split within the 15-party alliance. On the other hand, Zia declared the election illegal and urged people to resist the election. The parties took part in the election lost to the Jatiya Party. Zia's uncompromising attitude and her defiance of the military dictatorship created an image of an "uncompromising leader" in the eyes of the people. Gowher Rizvi, in his analysis, wrote:

The ability to stand up against governmental oppression, to boycott elections, to refuse offices of profit, or to suffer imprisonment are considered evidence of personal sacrifices something which is greatly admired by the people of a country where politics is generally an unabashed pursuit of power and personal aggrandizement. From the moment Khaleda was installed as the leader of the BNP, she has publicly remained opposed to participation in any election held while Ershad was in power. Her popularity soared after she boycotted the polls in 1986.

==== Fall of Ershad ====
On 13 October 1986, she was put under house arrest right before the 1986 Bangladeshi presidential election and was released only after the election. She took the lead on her release and initiated a fresh movement with a view to deposing Ershad. She called a half-day strike on 10 November of the same year, only to be put under house arrest again. On 24 January 1987, when Hasina joined the parliament session with other Awami League leaders, Zia was on the street demanding the dissolution of the parliament. She called for a mass rally in Dhaka, which turned violent, and top leaders of the BNP were arrested. After that, a series of strikes was organized by the 7-party alliance led by Zia from February to July 1987. On 22 October of the year, Zia's BNP, in collaboration with Hasina's Awami League, declared the "Dhaka Seize" programme on 10 November to overthrow Ershad.

As a countermeasure, Ershad's government rounded up thousands of political leaders and activists, but on the day of the seizure, there was complete chaos on the streets, and dozens died. The government put Zia under house arrest after detaining her from Purbani Hotel, from where she was coordinating the movement. On 11 December 1987, she was set free, but she immediately held a press conference and claimed that she was "prepared to die" to depose the dictator. After 1987, the two following years went relatively calmly with sporadic violence. A fresh wave of movements started when the BNP's student wing, Chatra Dal, started winning most of the student union elections across the country. By 1990, Chatra Dal took control of 270 out of 321 student unions in the country, riding on the popularity of Zia. They also won all the posts of Dhaka University Central Students' Union (DUCSU) in 1990.

The new committee of DUCSU, led by Amanullah Aman, declared fresh programmes to overthrow Ershad in line with the BNP's programmes. On 10 October 1990, in a violent turn of events, Chatra Dal leader Naziruddin Jehad died in Dhaka in clashes with pro-government forces, which paved the way for a greater alliance between all the opposition forces. After two-month-long protests, the BNP, led by Zia, along with other political parties, compelled Ershad to offer his resignation on 4 December 1990.

== Premiership ==
Zia served as the prime minister of Bangladesh three times. Her first term was from March 1991 to February 1996, the second term lasted for a few weeks after February 1996, and the third term was from October 2001 to October 2006.

=== First premiership (1991–1996) ===
A neutral interim government oversaw general elections on 27 February 1991. The BNP won 140 seats;– 11 short of a simple majority. Zia was sworn in as the country's first female prime minister on 20 March 1991 with the support of a majority of the deputies in parliament. With a unanimous vote, the parliament passed the 12th amendment to the constitution in August 1991, formally ending 16 years of presidential rule and returning Bangladesh to a parliamentary system.

Upon taking power, Zia promoted education and vocational training very radically. Her government made primary education free and mandatory for all, and for girls until the 10th grade. In 1994, the education budget was increased by 60%, the highest allocation among the formal budget sectors. Pass rate in the Secondary School Certificate Examination (SSC) examination climbed up to 73.2% in 1995, from 31.73% in 1990, thanks to her policies.

Zia's first government was also marked by major economic reforms, which included the introduction of value-added tax (VAT), the formulation of the Bank Company Act in 1991 and the Financial Institutions Act in 1993, and the establishment of the privatization board in 1993. A new export processing zone was established near Dhaka in 1993 to attract foreign investors. Her government also passed laws that allowed the mayors of city corporations to be elected by popular votes, which was elected by the ward councillors of each ward of the city corporation. As a part of decentralization efforts, her administration replaced the upazila system with thana in November 1991, and formed the Thana Development and Coordination Committee to coordinate development activities at the thana level.

When the opposition, including the Awami League and the Jamaat-e-Islami, boycotted the 15 February 1996 election, the BNP had a landslide victory in the 6th Jatiya Sangshad. Responding to the demands of the opposition parties, the short-lived parliament hastily introduced the caretaker government by passing the 13th amendment to the constitution, which allowed a neutral nonpartisan caretaker government to be formed before each general election. The parliament was dissolved to pave the way for early parliamentary elections. In the 12 June 1996 elections, the BNP lost to Sheikh Hasina's Awami League. Winning 116 seats, the BNP emerged as the largest opposition party in the country's parliamentary history.

=== Second premiership (2001–2006) ===
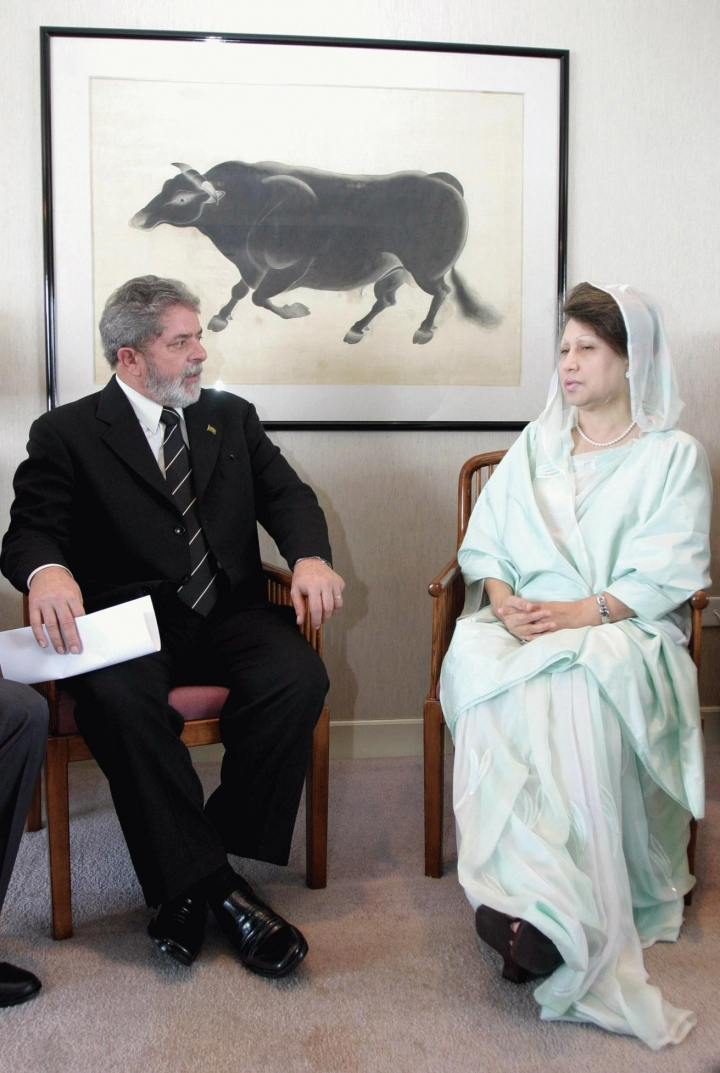
Zia with the President of Brazil, Lula da Silva (2004)

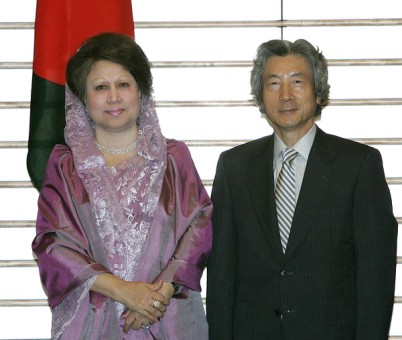
Zia with the Prime Minister of Japan, Junichiro Koizumi, in Tokyo (2005)

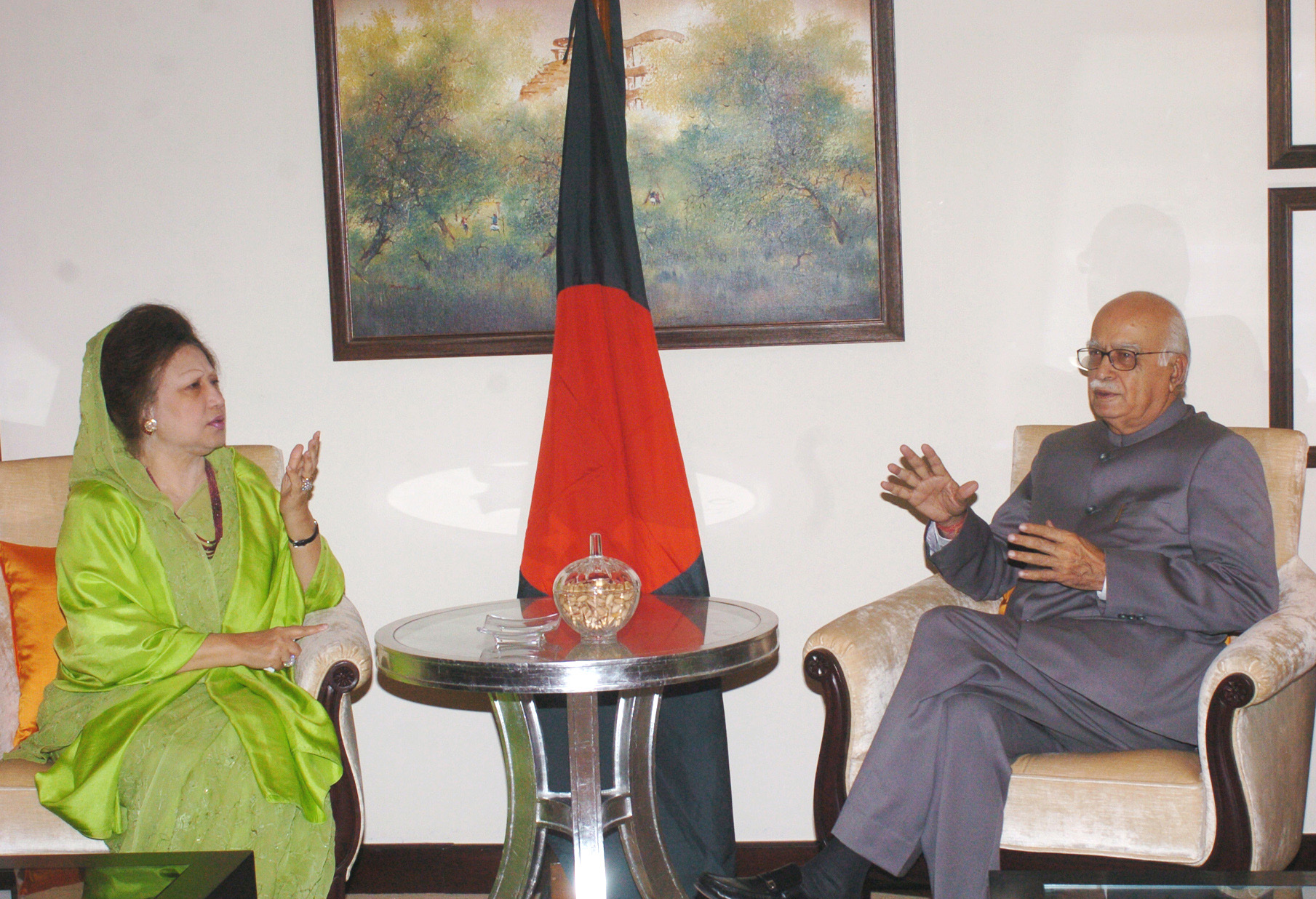
Zia with the Indian Leader of Opposition L. K. Advani in New Delhi (2006)

The BNP formed a four-party alliance with the Jatiya Party (E), Jamaat-e-Islami, Jatiya Party (N), and the Islami Oikya Jote on 6 January 1999. It encouraged protests against the Awami League government. Many residents strongly criticized Zia and the BNP for allying with Jamaat-e-Islami, which had been accused of siding with Pakistani Forces during the Liberation War. The four-party alliance participated in the 1 October 2001 general elections, winning two-thirds of the seats in parliament and 46% of the vote (compared to the principal opposition party's 40%).

Following her inauguration, Zia worked on a 100-day programme to fulfill most of her election pledges to the nation. Her government worked to educate young girls (nearly 70% of Bangladeshi women were illiterate) and distribute food to the poor (half of Bangladesh's 135 million people lived below the poverty line). Restoration of law and order was an achievement during the period. In 2006, Forbes magazine featured her administration in a major story praising her achievements. When Zia became prime minister for the third time, the share of domestic resources in economic development efforts grew. Bangladesh began to attract a higher level of international investment for the development of the country's infrastructure, energy resources and businesses, including from the United States, United Kingdom, and Japan.

Her government promoted strong GDP growth based on economic reforms and support of an entrepreneurial culture. During this term, the GDP growth rate of Bangladesh remained above 6 percent. The Bangladesh per capita national income rose to 482 dollars. The foreign exchange reserves of Bangladesh had crossed 3 billion dollars from the previous 1 billion dollars. The foreign direct investments of Bangladesh had risen to 2.5 billion dollars. The industrial sector of the GDP had exceeded 17 percent at the end of Zia's office. At the same time, Bangladesh was the most corrupt country in the world according to the Corruption Perceptions Index during her tenure. Overall, the BNP's term between 2001 and 2006 saw significant growth in the industrial and service sectors of the economy, as well as uplifting of people from poverty, and Bangladesh emerged as an economic stronghold in South Asia.

== Post-premiership (2006–2025) ==
=== Political crisis and military intervention ===
After Zia's term ended on 29 October 2006, serious dispute emerged over the selection of the chief adviser (head of the caretaker government). Under the constitution, the immediate past chief justice was to be appointed. However, Chief Justice Khondokar Mahmud Hasan (K M Hasan) declined the position. On the eve of the last day, rioting broke out on the streets of central Dhaka. 40 people were killed and hundreds injured in the first month after the government's resignation in November 2006.

President Iajuddin Ahmed, as provided for in the constitution, assumed power as Chief Adviser on 29 October 2006. He tried to arrange elections and bring all political parties to the table. Mukhlesur Rahman Chowdhury, the presidential adviser, met with Zia and Hasina, and other political parties to try to resolve issues and schedule elections. Officially on 26 December 2006, all political parties joined the planned 22 January 2007 elections. The Awami League pulled out at the last minute, and in January, the military intervened to back the caretaker government for a longer interim period. It held power until holding general elections in December 2008.

=== Detention during the caretaker government ===
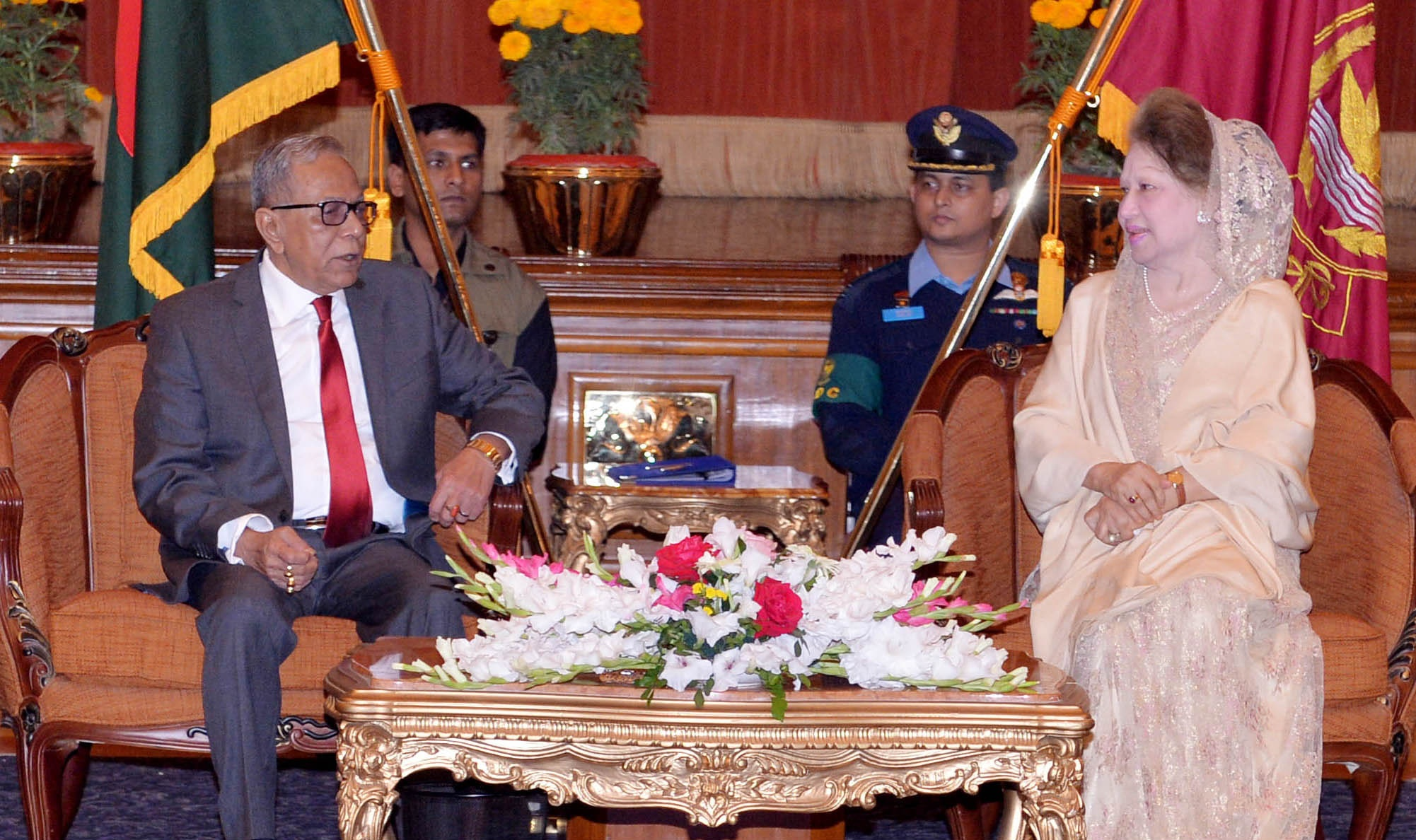
Khaleda Zia meets president Abdul Hamid in 2016

Former Bangladesh Bank governor Fakhruddin Ahmed became the chief adviser of the caretaker government on 12 January 2007. Enforcing the suppression of political activity under the state of emergency, the government barred politicians from visiting Zia's residence between 9 and 25 April. Both of Zia's sons were arrested for corruption. The Daily Star reported that Zia had agreed to go into exile with Arafat. However, her family said that the Saudi Arabian government reportedly declined to allow her into the country because "it was reluctant to take in an unwilling guest."

The Anti-Corruption Commission (ACC) also brought several charges of corruption against her. She was arrested on 3 September, and was detained in a makeshift prison at the parliament building premises. She was finally released on bail on 11 September 2008, ending her yearlong detention under the caretaker government.

Meanwhile, BNP standing committee members chose former Minister of Finance Saifur Rahman and former Minister of Water Resources Hafizuddin Ahmed to lead the party during Zia's detention. The Bangladesh Election Commission subsequently invited Hafizuddin's faction, rather than Zia's, to participate in talks, effectively recognizing the former as the legitimate BNP. Zia challenged this in court, but her appeal was rejected on 10 April 2008.

=== Leader of the Opposition (2009–2014) ===
In December 2008, the caretaker government organized general elections in which Zia's party lost to the Awami League and its Grand Alliance, which took a two-thirds majority of seats in the parliament. Hasina became the prime minister, and her party formed a government in early 2009, while Zia became the leader of the opposition.

==== Eviction from the Cantonment house ====
Zia's family had been living for 38 years in the 1.1-hectare (2.72-acre) plot house at 6, Shaheed Mainul Road in Dhaka Cantonment. It was the official residence of her husband, Ziaur Rahman, when he was appointed as the Deputy Chief of Staff (DCS) of the Bangladesh Army. After he became the president of Bangladesh, he kept the house as his residence. Following his assassination in 1981, the acting president, Abdus Sattar, leased the house "for life" to Zia for a nominal ৳101. When the army took over the government in 1983, Hussain Mohammad Ershad confirmed this arrangement.

In April 2009, the Directorate of Military Lands and Cantonments handed Zia a notice asking her to vacate the cantonment residence. Allegations and irregularities were mentioned in the notice include – carrying out political activities from the house, (which reportedly went against a condition of the allotment), allotment of two government houses in the capital city, leased residence for a civilian within the cantonment area. Zia vacated the house on 13 November 2010, and moved to the residence of her brother, Sayeed Iskandar, in the Gulshan neighbourhood.

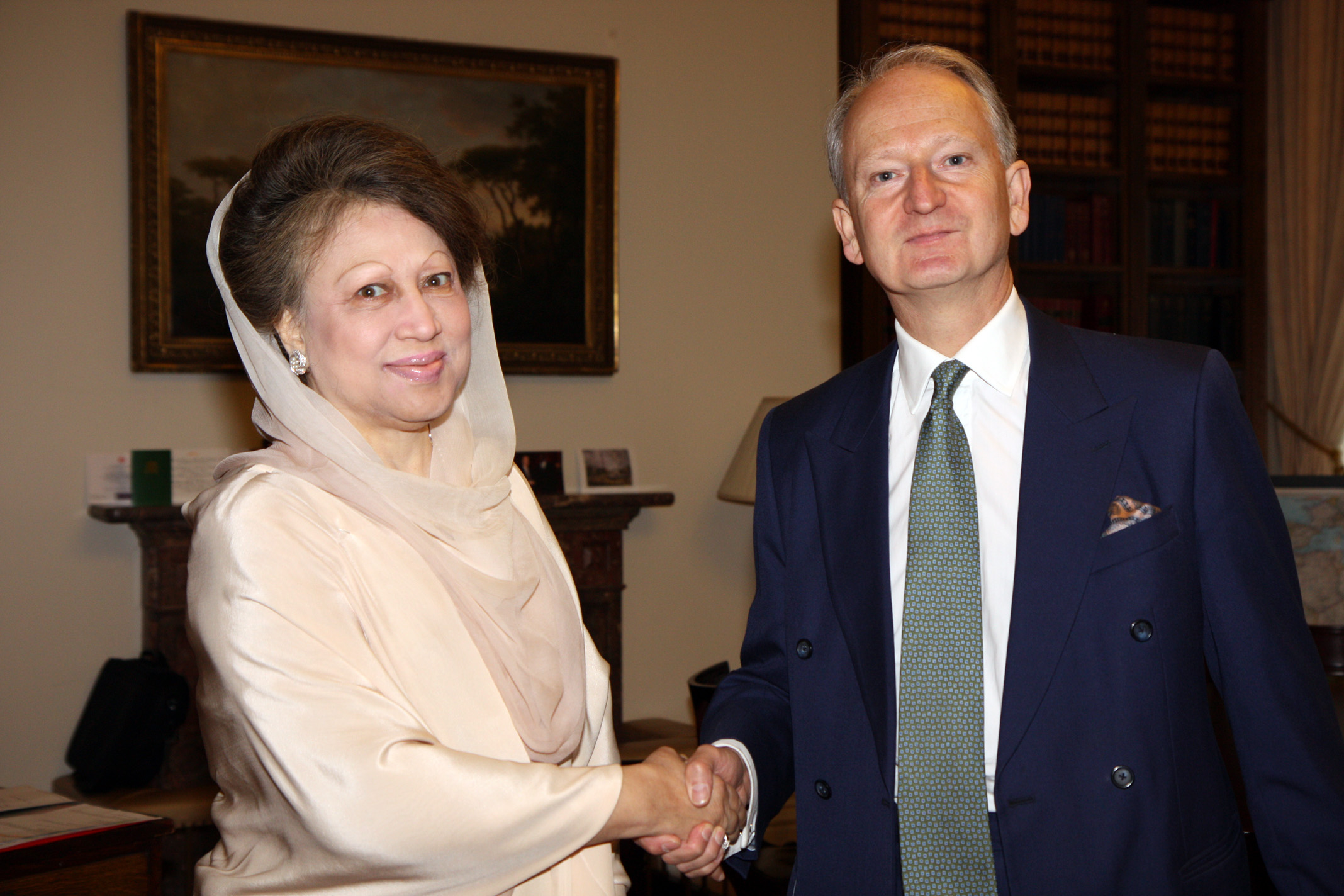
British Foreign Office Minister Henry Bellingham meeting Zia (2011)

==== Boycotting the 2014 election ====
Zia's party took a stance against participating in the 2014 general election unless it was administered under a nonpartisan caretaker government, but the then prime minister Sheikh Hasina rejected the demand. This resulted in serious violence and political crisis. The Awami League won the election in 232 out of 300 seats, but the official counts from Dhaka suggested that the turnout averaged about 22 percent.

=== Charges and imprisonment (2018–2024) ===
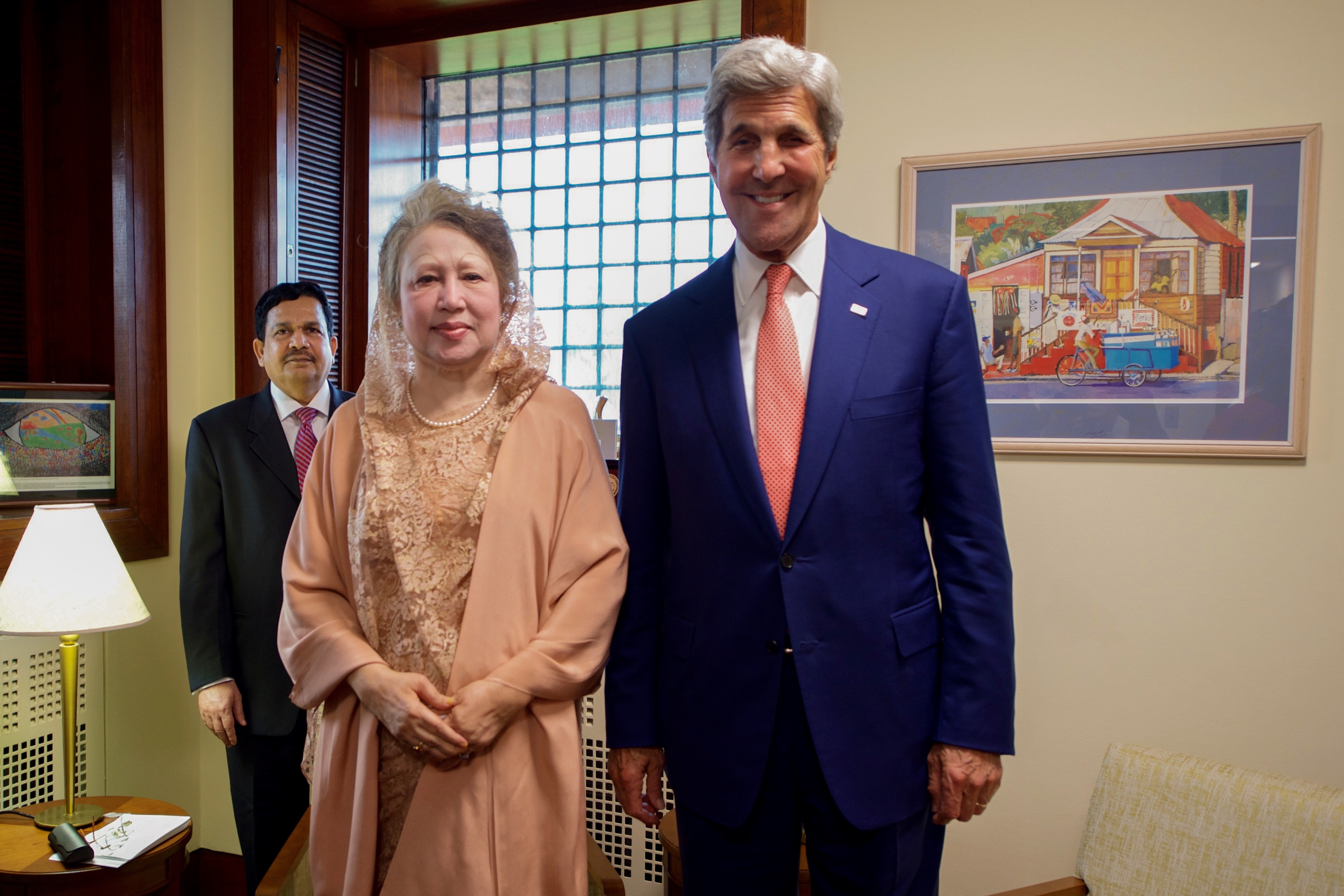
US Secretary John Kerry with Zia at the US Embassy in Dhaka (2016)

In 2017, the police conducted a raid on Zia's house to search for "anti-state" documents. On 8 February 2018, she was sentenced to prison for five years in the Zia Orphanage Trust corruption case. Ahead of the verdict, Mobile phone jammers were installed at the Bakshibazar court premises. She was sent as the sole inmate to the Old Dhaka Central Jail since all the inmates had been transferred to the newly built Dhaka Central Jail in Keraniganj two years earlier. Dhaka Special Judge's Court-5 directed the jail authorities to provide first-class division to her. On 31 October 2018, the High Court raised her jail term to 10 years after the ACC pleaded for a revision. Her party claimed that the verdict was politically biased.

On 30 October 2018, in another case, the Zia Charitable Trust graft case, Zia was sentenced to 7 years of rigorous imprisonment. She was also accused in 32 other cases. Her nomination papers to contest for the Feni-1, Bogra-6 and Bogra-7 constituencies at the 2018 general election were also rejected, as the Bangladeshi constitution does not allow convicted persons to contest in the elections. Her party lost that election to the Awami League.

Zia's health had deteriorated during imprisonment. She was first admitted to Bangladesh Medical University for medical treatment on 1 April 2019. The High Court and the Supreme Court rejected her bail plea on humanitarian grounds a total of four times between 2019 and 2020. On 25 March 2020, Zia was released from prison for six months, conditioned to stay at her home in Gulshan and not leave the country. By 2021, the term of her release had been extended four times.

=== 2024 release and acquittals ===
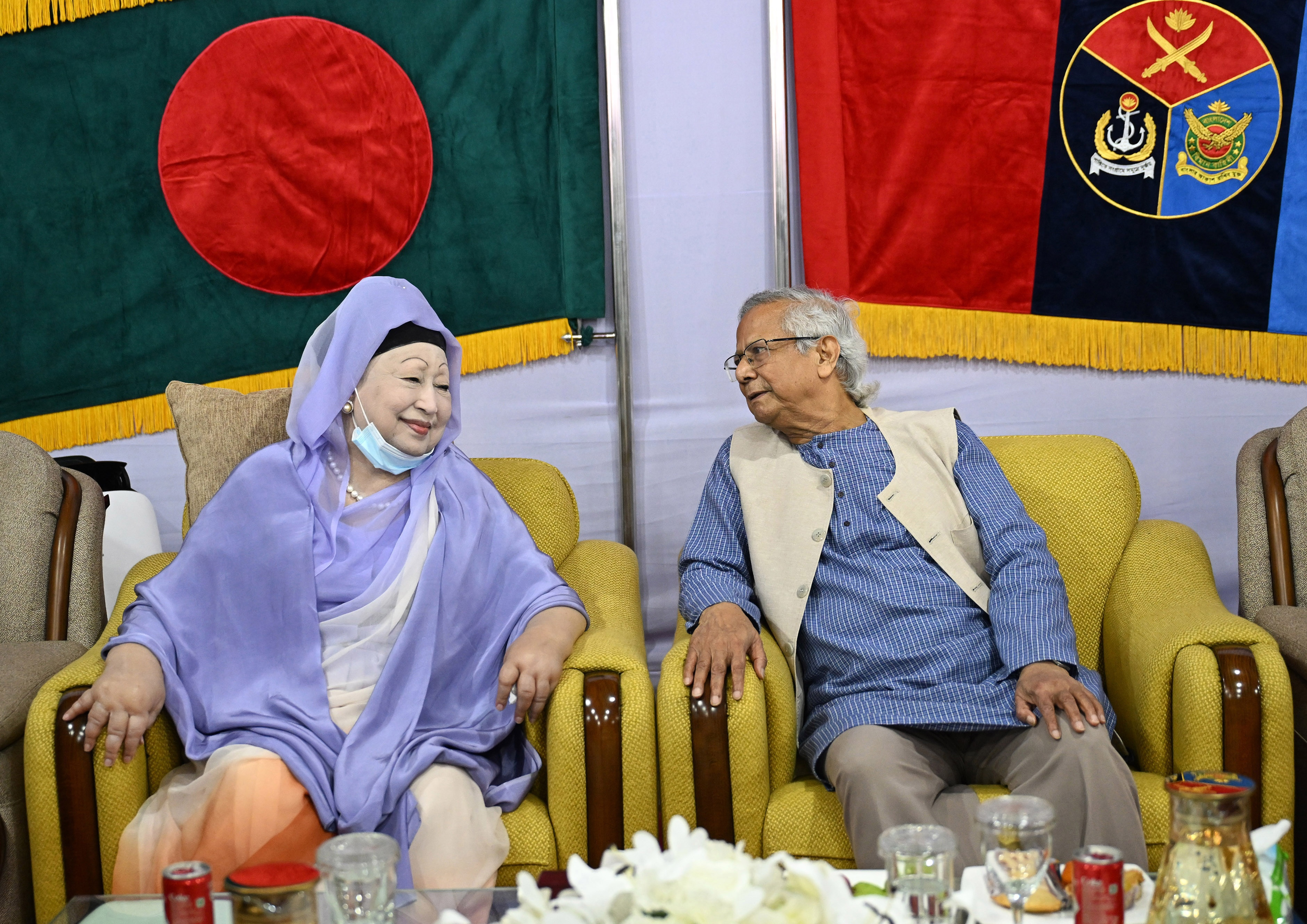
Zia with Muhammad Yunus in November 2025

After the resignation of Sheikh Hasina as prime minister during the July Uprising, on 5 August, President Mohammed Shahabuddin ordered Zia's release. Shortly afterward, she made her first public statements since 2018 from her medical confinement, during which she praised "the brave people who were in a do-or-die struggle to make possible the impossible" and urged restraint and the need for "love and peace" in rebuilding Bangladesh.

Zia was acquitted in several cases involving accusations of defamation and misappropriation since then. The home ministry also restored her police escort privileges that had been removed by Hasina's government in 2015. Zia's bank accounts, which had been frozen since 2007, were ordered unblocked by the National Board of Revenue. In 2025, Zia stated that she would contest the 2026 general election, announcing her candidacies for the seats of Bogra-7, Feni-1, and Dinajpur-3. However, it was also announced that the BNP's election campaign would be run under the leadership and image of her son, Tarique Rahman.

== Illness and death ==
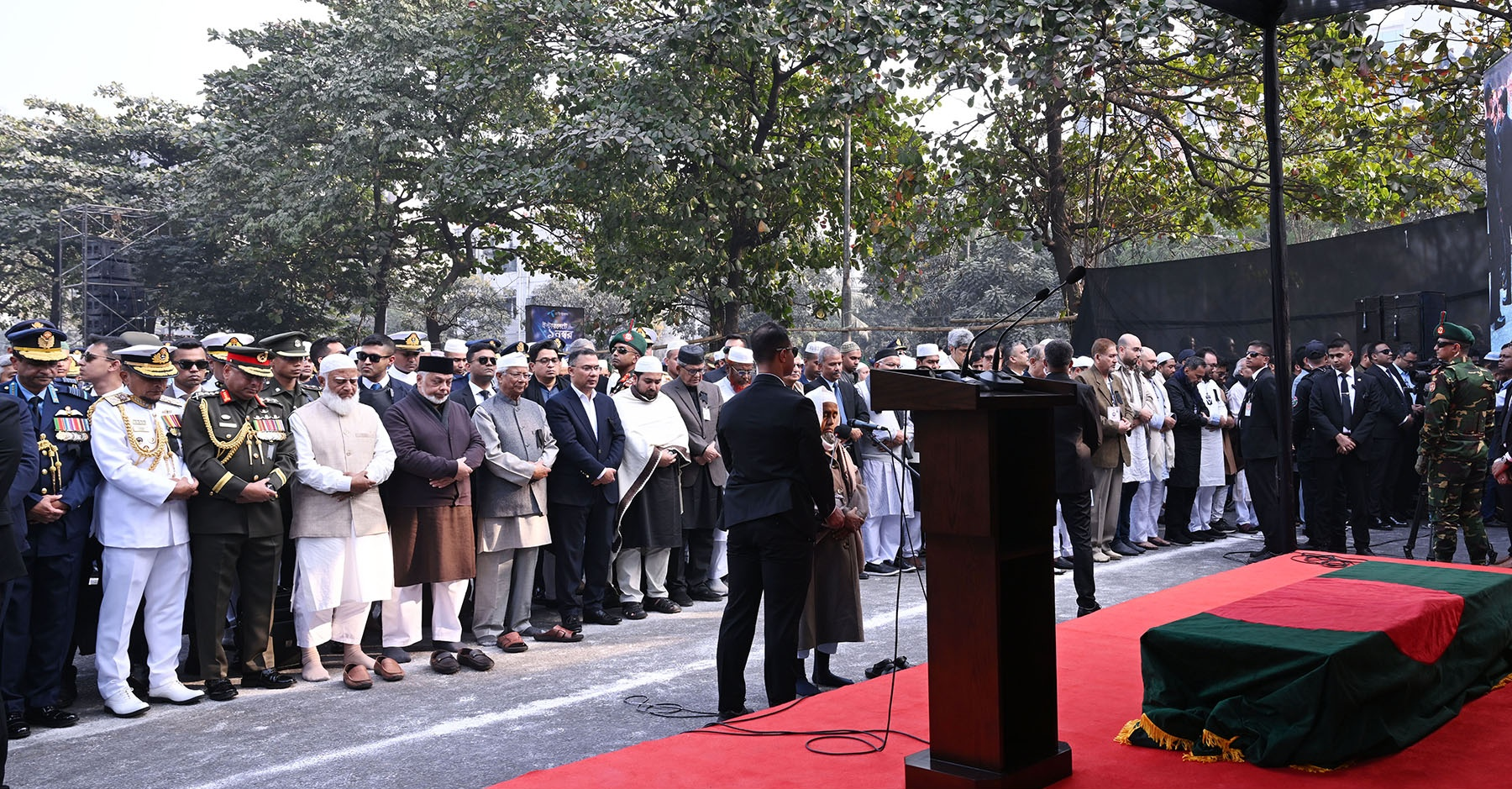
Funeral prayer of Khaleda Zia

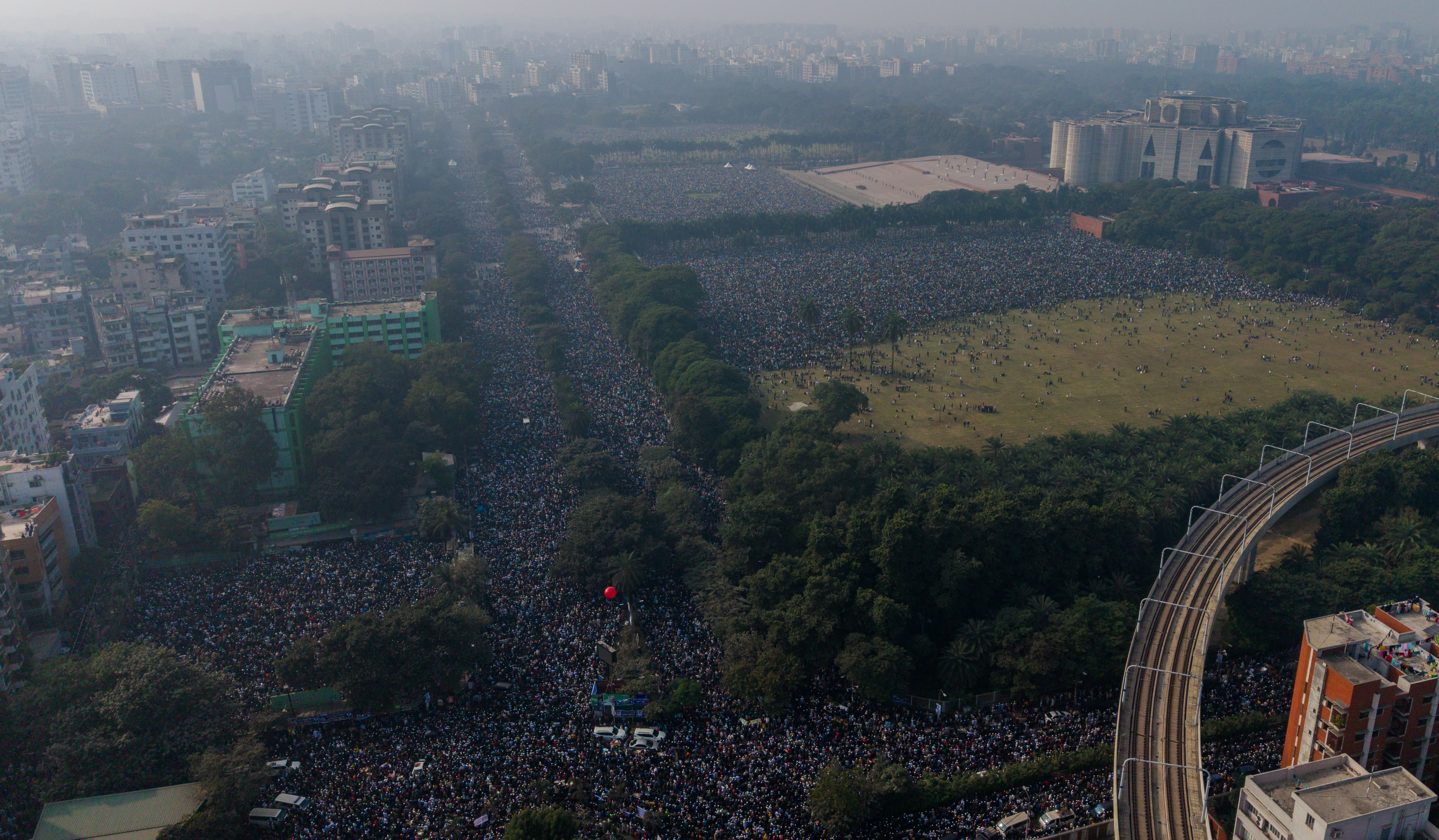
Crowd at the funeral of Khaleda Zia

Zia had been suffering from chronic kidney conditions, decompensated liver diseases, unstable hemoglobin, diabetes, rheumatoid arthritis, and other age-related complications since 2021. In April 2021, several staff members in Zia's home tested positive for COVID-19. Zia was also found to have contracted the virus, but she exhibited no symptoms and recovered later. On 28 November, the medical board formed for Zia's treatment announced that she had been suffering from liver cirrhosis. Zia underwent treatment at Evercare Hospital Dhaka during 27 April–19 June 2021, 12 October–3 November 2021 and again since 14 November 2021. Despite a plea, the court did not allow her to seek medical care abroad.

After she was released from imprisonment, Zia was allowed go abroad for treatment. On 7 January 2025, she went to London aboard a special air ambulance sent by the Emir of Qatar, Tamim bin Hamad Al Thani. The next day, she was admitted to The London Clinic. On 23 November 2025, Zia was again hospitalised in "very critical" condition and was taken to the Evercare Hospital Dhaka. On 1 December 2025, the interim government declared her a VVIP and deployed the Special Security Force (SSF) for her security.

On 30 December, the BNP announced that Zia died due to her prolonged illness at Evercare Hospital. She was buried the next day beside the grave of her husband, Ziaur Rahman, at Zia Udyan following a state funeral conducted by Mufti Muhammad Abdul Malek, khatib of Baitul Mukarram National Mosque.

=== Reactions ===
Muhammad Yunus, the chief adviser of Bangladesh, expressed "profound sorrow" at her death. Three days of state mourning and a day of public holiday were declared. Indian prime minister Narendra Modi said he was "deeply saddened" by Khaleda's death and offered his "sincerest condolences" to her family and the people of Bangladesh. Pakistan's prime minister Shehbaz Sharif expressed deep sadness and described Zia as a "committed friend of Pakistan". The US embassy in Dhaka extended its condolences on her death. Maldivian president Mohamed Muizzu extended his condolences on her death and prayed to Allah to strengthen her family during the difficult time.

Many foreign dignitaries attended the funeral of Zia, which included Sardar Ayaz Sadiq, Speaker of the National Assembly of Pakistan; D. N. Dhungyel, Foreign Minister of Bhutan; S. Jaishankar, External Affairs Minister of India; Bala Nanda Sharma, Foreign Minister of Nepal; Vijitha Herath, Minister of Foreign Affairs, Foreign Employment and Tourism of Sri Lanka; and Dr. Ali Haidar Ahmed, Minister of Higher Education, Labour, and Skills Development of the Republic of Maldives.

== Electoral history ==
Khaleda Zia won parliament elections in Feni, Bogura, Dhaka, Khulna, Chittagong, and Laxmipur; wherever she contested, she won. Khaleda Zia is the only example in the country's electoral history of someone who contested 23 parliamentary seats in 5 parliamentary elections and won each one. Even in the elections where the BNP could not form the government, she won all the seats she contested.

Year	Constituency	Party	Votes	%	Result
1991	Bogra-7	BNP	83,854	66.9	Won
1991	Dhaka-5	BNP	71,266	51.5	Won
1991	Dhaka-9	BNP	55,946	60.4	Won
1991	Feni-1	BNP	36,375	38.7	Won
1991	Chittagong-8	BNP	69,422	52.1	Won
June 1996	Bogra-6	BNP	1,36,669	58.9	Won
June 1996	Bogra-7	BNP	1,07,417	72.1	Won
June 1996	Feni-1	BNP	65,086	55.6	Won
June 1996	Lakshmipur-2	BNP	59,054	51.6	Won
June 1996	Chittagong-1	BNP	66,336	48.2	Won
2001		BNP			
2001	Bogra-6	BNP	2,27,355	78.6	Won
2001	Bogra-7	BNP	1,47,522	79.0	Won
2001	Khulna-2	BNP	91,819	57.8	Won
2001	Lakshmipur-2	BNP	1,23,526	72.2	Won
2001	Feni-1	BNP	1,03,149	72.2	Won
2008		BNP			
2008	Bogra-6	BNP	1,93,792	71.6	Won
2008	Bogra-7	BNP	2,32,761	71.2	Won
2008	Feni-1	BNP	1,14,482	65.4	Won

== Awards and honours ==
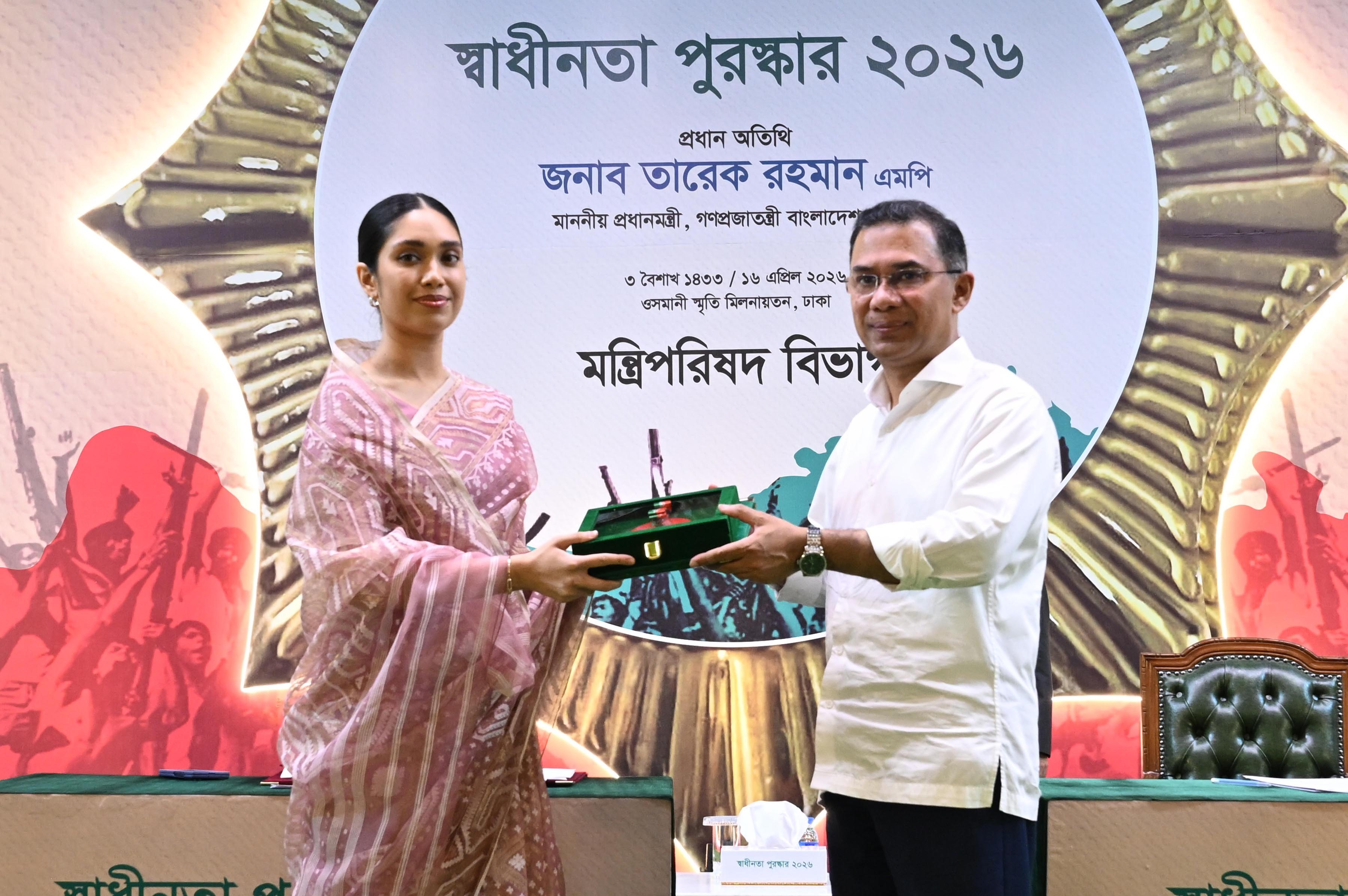
The 2026 Independence Award, the highest civilian honor in Bangladesh, conferred posthumously on Khaleda Zia, was accepted by her granddaughter Zaima Rahman.

On 24 May 2011, the New Jersey State Senate honoured Zia as a "Fighter for Democracy". It was the first time the state Senate had so honoured any foreign leader and reflected the state's increasing population of immigrants and descendants from South Asia. On 31 July 2018, an organization named the Canadian Human Rights International Organization (CHRIO) gave her the "Mother of Democracy" award. On 8 February 2022, the BNP presented the crest and certificate given by this Canadian organization to the journalists in a press conference at the BNP Chairperson's office in Gulshan.

In 2026, The Hamtramck City Council in Michigan, United States has renamed “Carpenter Street” as “Khaleda Zia Street” in the honour of Zia.

In April 2026, Khaleda Zia was posthumously awarded the Independence Award, Bangladesh's highest civilian honor, which was received by her granddaughter, Zaima Rahman.

On 7 March 2026, Bangladesh's Ministry of Women and Children Affairs announced that former prime minister Khaleda Zia would be honored with the title “Democracy’s Best Indomitable Woman” during the observance of International Women's Day 2026 under the ministry's “Indomitable Women Award” program. On 8 March, Zaima Rahman, Khaleda's granddaughter and daughter of Tarique Rahman, received the award on behalf of her grandmother from the president Mohammed Shahabuddin.

== Eponyms ==
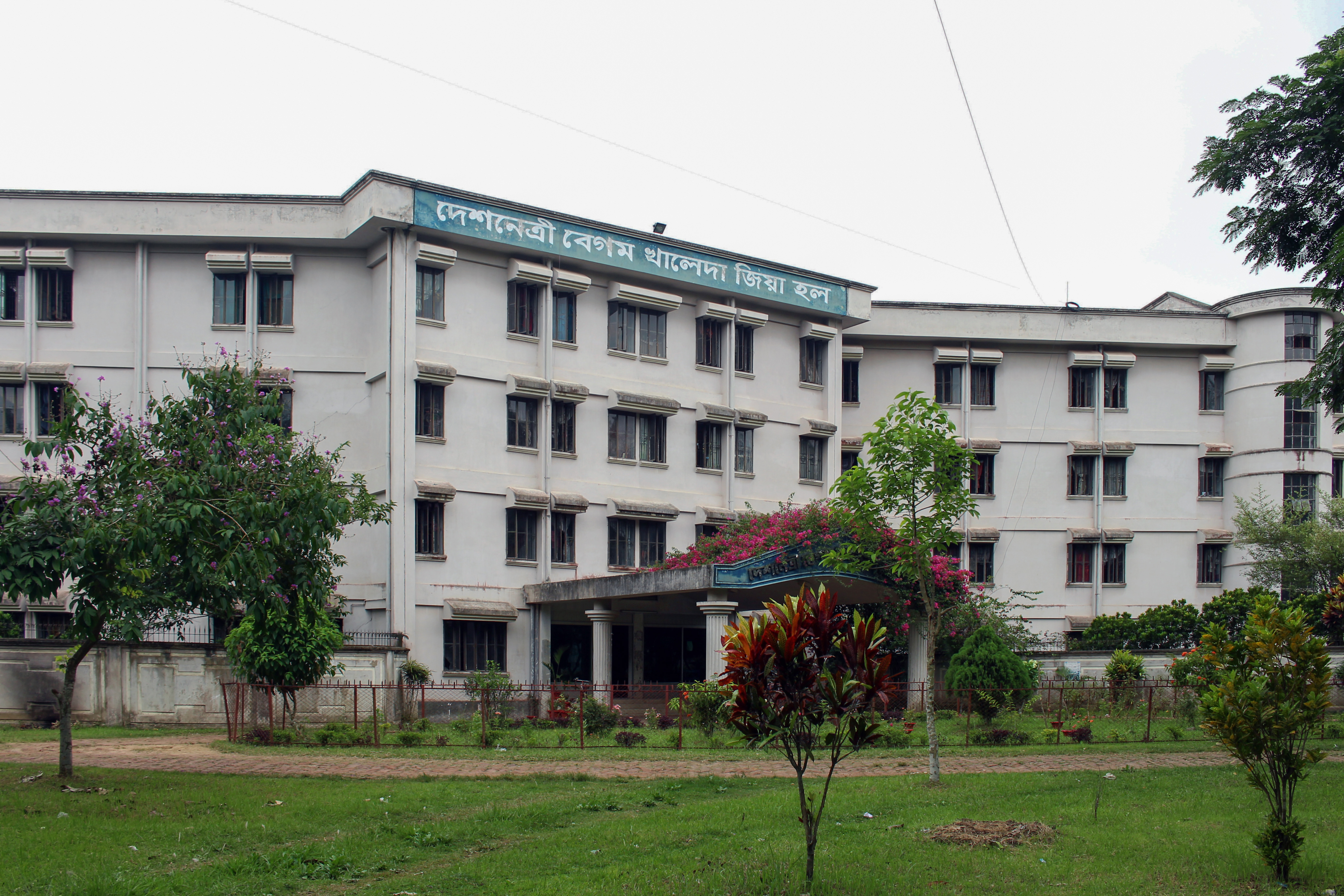
Deshnetri Begum Khaleda Zia Hall at the University of Chittagong

- Begum Khaleda Zia Hall, a residential hall at Islamic University, Kushtia.
- Deshnetri Begum Khaleda Zia Hall, a residential hall at the University of Chittagong.
- Begum Khaleda Zia Hall, a residential hall at Jahangirnagar University.
- Begum Khaleda Zia Hall, a residential hall at the University of Rajshahi.

== See also ==
- Battle of Begums
- List of international prime ministerial trips made by Khaleda Zia

== Bibliography ==
- Mahfuz Ullah (18 November 2018). Begum Khaleda Zia: Her Life Her Story. The Universal Academy. ISBN 978-984-93757-0-8.
- S. Abdul Hakim (1992), Begum Khaleda Zia of Bangladesh – A Political Biography, Vikas Publishing House

Honorary titles
Preceded by Sheikh Fazilatunnesa Mujib	First Lady of Bangladesh; 1977–1981	Succeeded by Rowshan Ershad
Party political offices
Preceded by Abdus Sattar	Chairperson of the Bangladesh Nationalist Party; 1984–2025	Succeeded by Tarique Rahman
Jatiya Sangsad
Preceded by Kazi Zafar Ahmed	Leader of the House; 1991–1996	Succeeded by Sheikh Hasina
Preceded by Zafar Imam	Member of Parliament for Feni-1; 1991–2001	Succeeded by Sayeed Iskander
Preceded by Zafar Imam	Member of Parliament for Bogra-6; 2001–2006	Succeeded by Muhammad Jamiruddin Sircar
Preceded by Sheikh Hasina	Leader of the House; 2001–2006	Succeeded by Sheikh Hasina
Preceded by Sayeed Iskander	Member of Parliament for Feni-1; 2008–2014	Succeeded by Shirin Akhter
Political offices
Preceded by Kazi Zafar Ahmed	Prime Minister of Bangladesh; 1991–1996	Succeeded by Muhammad Habibur Rahman as acting prime minister
Vacant Title last held by Sheikh Hasina	Leader of the Opposition; 1996–2001	Succeeded by Sheikh Hasina
Preceded by Latifur Rahman as acting prime minister	Prime Minister of Bangladesh; 2001–2006	Succeeded by Iajuddin Ahmed as acting prime minister
Preceded by Sheikh Hasina	Leader of the Opposition; 2008–2014	Succeeded by Rowshan Ershad
