= Zafar Imam =

Bangladeshi politician

Zafar Imam BB
- জাফর ইমাম

Minister of Environment, Forest and Climate change
- In office 23 December 1989 – 6 December 1990
- Preceded by: A.K.M. Maidul Islam Mukul
- Succeeded by: Kazi Fazlur Rahman

Minister of Cultural Affairs
- In office 3 October 1989 – 23 December 1989
- Preceded by: Noor Muhammad Khan
- Succeeded by: Syed Didar Bakht

State Minister of Power, Energy and Mineral Resources
- In office 25 May 1986 – 9 July 1986
- Preceded by: Mohammad Abdul Munim (as Minister)
- Succeeded by: Mohammad Abdul Munim (as Minister)

Deputy Minister of Disaster Management and relief
- In office 25 April 1980 – 27 November 1981
- Preceded by: Emran Ali Sarkar (as Minister)
- Succeeded by: Emran Ali Sarkar (as Minister)

Member of Parliament
- In office 3 March 1988 – 6 December 1990
- Preceded by: Himself
- Succeeded by: Khaleda Zia
- Constituency: Feni-1
- In office 7 May 1986 – 3 March 1988
- Preceded by: Position Established
- Succeeded by: Himself
- Constituency: Feni-1
- In office 18 February 1979 – 24 March 1982
- Preceded by: A. B. M. Musa
- Succeeded by: Moudud Ahmed
- Constituency: Noakhali-1

Personal details
- Born: 13 December 1948 (age 77) Feni, East Bengal, Pakistan
- Party: Bangladesh Awami League
- Spouse: Nurmahal Begum
- Education: Dhaka University
- Awards: Bir Bikrom

Military service
- Allegiance: Pakistan (Before 1971); Bangladesh
- Branch/service: Pakistan Army; Bangladesh Army
- Years of service: 1967-1976
- Rank: Lieutenant Colonel
- Unit: Frontier Force Regiment; East Bengal Regiment
- Commands: Sub-Commander of Sector – II; CO of 10th East Bengal Regiment; CO of 5th East Bengal Regiment; CO of 15th East Bengal Regiment
- Battles/wars: Bangladesh Liberation War

Zafar Imam (born 13 December 1948) is a Bangladesh Awami League politician and a former minister of the Ministry of Environment, Forest and Climate Change, and a former member of parliament for Feni-1.

== Early life and education ==
He was born on 13 December 1948 in Feni District. He passed SSC from Feni Government Pilot High School in 1963. He completed HSC from Feni Government College in 1965. He joined the Pakistan Military Academy in 1966 while studying in Dhaka University.

== Military career ==
=== Pakistan Army ===
Imam was commissioned in April 1967 in the 9th Frontier Force Regiment. He served in 9th Frontier Force Regiment till 1970. In late 1970, he was transferred to the 24th Frontier Force Regiment. In 1971 he was posted to the 24 Frontier Force Regiment as a captain in Comilla Cantonment.

=== Bangladesh Army ===
After the crackdown he left the Pakistan Army and joined the Mukti Bahini. He fought in Sector 2 and served there as a Sub Sector Commander. In October when K Force was formed then he was promoted to the rank of major and was appointed as the founding commanding officer of 10 East Bengal Regiment.He was awarded Bir Bikram for his role during the war. He served as the provost marshal of Bangladesh Army. Later he was appointed as the commanding officer of 15th East Bengal Regiment in Rangpur Cantonment. He was promoted to the rank of lieutenant colonel in 1975. He went to retirement in 1976.

== Political career ==
In 1980 Imam joined the cabinet of Ziaur Rahman. After the assassination of President Ziaur Rahman he joined the cabinet of President Abdus Sattar as a minister of state and was given the charge of the Ministry of Disaster Management and Relief. He served there till 24 March 1982. Later he joined the Jatiya Party and was elected to parliament from Feni-1 in 1986. He was re-elected from Feni-1. On 23 December 1989 he joined the cabinet of President Hussein Mohammad Ershad and took charge as the minister of environment forest and climate change. He served until the government fell down in late 1990.

Imam contested the 1991 election from Feni-1 as a candidate of the Jatiya Party but lost to Prime Minister Khaleda Zia. The Awami League had nominated Md. Zakaria Bhuiyan who also lost.

Imam contested the 1996 election from Feni-1 as a candidate of the Jatiya Party but came a distant third behind Prime Minister Khaleda Zia.

Imam contested the 2001 election from Feni-1 as a candidate of the Awami League but lost to Prime Minister Khaleda Zia.

== Personal life ==
He is currently married to Nurmahal Begum.
