= Fulgazi Upazila =

Fulgazi ফুলগাজী
- Upazila
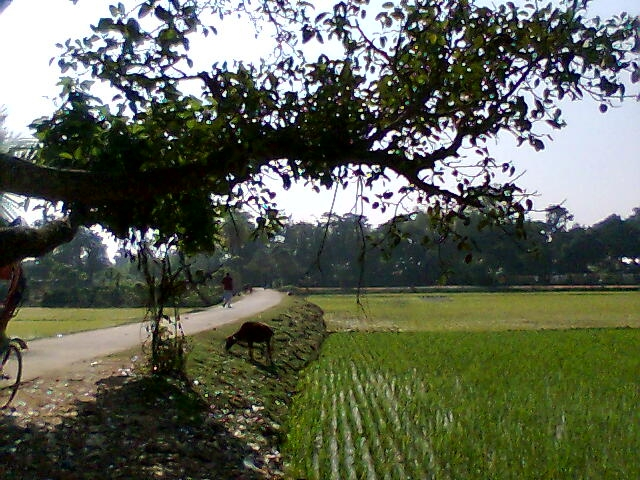
- A narrow paved road winding through paddy fields in Dakkhin Sripur, Fulgazi upazila

- Coordinates: 23°08′N 91°26′E
- Country: Bangladesh
- Division: Chittagong
- District: Feni
- Thana: 1975
- Upazila: 5 November 2002
- Named for: Phulgazi Muhammad Khan Majumdar

Government
  - MP (Feni-1): Alauddin Ahmed Chowdhury Nasim
  - Upazila Chairman: Harun Majumdar

Area
  - Total: 102.19 km^{2} (39.46 sq mi)

Population (2022)
  - Total: 125,444
  - Density: 1,227.6/km^{2} (3,179.4/sq mi)
- Time zone: UTC+6 (BST)
- Postal code: 3942 (Fulgazi)
- Postal code: 3943 (Munshirhat)
- Area code: 03326
- Website: fulgazi.feni.gov.bd

Fulgazi Upazila mauza geocode map

Fulgazi (Bengali: ফুলগাজী), also spelt Phulgazi, is an upazila of the Feni District, located in Bangladesh's Chittagong Division. It is best known as the home upazila of Khaleda Zia, a former Prime Minister of Bangladesh.

== History ==
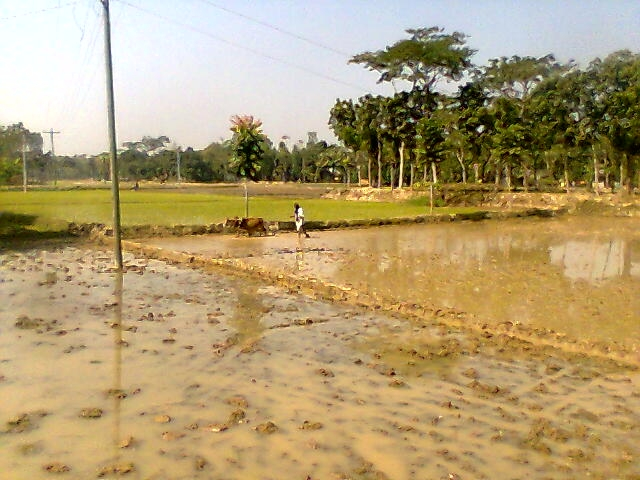
The village of South Sripur in Fulgazi.

In circa 1553, a merchant from the Middle East known as Murad Khan settled in Chittagong, but due to devastating floods, later migrated to modern-day Sripur in Fulgazi. He left behind four sons; Nahar Muhammad Khan, Tahir Muhammad Khan, Phul Muhammad Khan and Arif Muhammad Khan. Phul Muhammad Khan fought under Shamsher Ghazi against the Twipra Kingdom, and himself gained the title of Ghazi. The area came to be known as Phulgazi, or Fulgazi, after Phul Muhammad Khan. In 1701/1701 (1111 in the Tripuri calendar), Nahar Muhammad Khan built a large reservoir in his palace. To the west of the reservoir, the family built a three-domed mosque which is now known as the Sripur Jami Mosque and continues to be used today. The Maharaja of Tripura signed a peace treaty with Shamsher Gazi and his forces which included Nahar and Phulgazi. The treaty mentioned that Nahar received 80 droṇ of revenue-free land, 14 zamindari mouzas and the title of Majumdar. These 14 mouzas make up the modern-day Fulgazi Union.

Out of his five sons, Nahar Muhammad Khan Majumdar was succeeded by his eldest son - Azgar Ali Majumdar. He also had five sons; Aqamat Ali Majumdar, Hashmat Ali Majumdar, Bashrat Ali Majumdar (father of two), Salamat Ali Majumdar and Mafizul Islam Majumdar. Hashmat had five sons; Tufazzal Husayn Majumdar, Tabarak Husayn Majumdar, Muhammad Sadiq Majumdar, Vilayat Husayn Majumdar and Mazharul Husayn Majumdar. The latter was also known as Muzzammil Ali and became a Sufi pir by the sobriquet of Pir Pagla Dervish (died November 1975). Aqamat had no sons and Mafizul died before getting married and so Salamat was Azgar's heir. Salamat had 7 sons; most notably Muqaddas Ali Majumdar and Iskandar Ali Majumdar. Iskandar was a wealthy tea-businessman who was married to Taiyaba Majumder and eventually migrated to Dinajpur. They had four children, most notably Khaleda Zia; who would become the Prime Minister of Bangladesh in 1991.

During the Bangladesh Liberation War of 1971, Fulgazi was under Sector 2 commanded by Khaled Mosharraf and later ATM Haider. On 10 June, the Mukti Bahini shot 50 Pakistani forces dead while they were crossing the Bandhua Bridge in Fulgazi. The area was liberated on 6 December. A thana (police station) was established in Fulgazi in 1975.

A deadly tornado in Fulgazi and surrounding areas led to around 200 deaths on 12 April 1981. On 2 June 2002, Fulgazi thana was upgraded to a sub-district by gaining 6 union councils from Parshuram Upazila. The transfer was inaugurated by Prime Minister Khaleda Zia on 5 November. The 1998 floods caused heavy damages to Fulgazi's settlements, crops, livestock and other properties.

On 20 May 2014, Ekramul Haque, inaugural chairman of Fulgazi Upazila was shot and burnt alive at 45 years of age. Some have accused Joynal Hazari, an Awami League MP to have had some sort of involvement in the murder; though it remains one of Bangladesh's unresolved murder cases. Haque was succeeded as chairman by Muhammad Abdul Alim of Gosaipur.

== Geography ==
Fulgazi has an area of 99.03 square kilometers. It is situated in the northern part of Feni. The rivers Muhuri, Selonia, and Kahuya flow through the area. It is bordered by Tripura to its east, Parshuram to its north and Feni Sadar to its south. Fulgazi is approximately 164 kilometres from the capital, Dhaka. Munshirhat is one of the big market place of Fulgazi. Parshuram lies on the north on the other hand Chhagalnaiya is on its south. Fulgazi lies on a flood plain and a fertile land. Since Fulgazi lies on a floodplain, it has water readily available for the irrigation of rice plantations and fish farming. Selonia channel and Muhuri river runs through Fulgazi from India on the north. The climate of Fulgazi is tropical; mild winter (October to March); hot, humid summer (March to June); humid, warm rainy monsoon (June to October). During the summers and monsoon season of Bangladesh, rivers at Fulgazi overflow causing damages to the flood embankment and rice crops by flooding and making access to Fulgazi difficult by road, resulting in famine. A non functional rail track runs through this sub-district.

== Demographics ==
Religions in Fulgazi Upazila (2022)
Religion	Percent
Islam	93.29%
Hinduism	6.68%
Other or not stated	0.03%

According to the 2022 Bangladeshi census, Fulgazi Upazila had 28,428 households and a population of 125,444. 10.06% of the population were under 5 years of age. Fulgazi had a literacy rate (age 7 and over) of 81.47%: 83.30% for males and 79.94% for females, and a sex ratio of 86.86 males for every 100 females. 17,382 (13.86%) lived in urban areas.

As of the 2011 Census of Bangladesh, Fulgazi had 23,494 households and a population of 119,558. 26,218 (21.93%) were under 10 years of age. Fulgazi had an average literacy rate of 60.00%, compared to the national average of 51.8%, and a sex ratio of 1012 females per 1000 males. 4,453 (3.72%) of the population lived in urban areas.

== Economy and tourism ==
The Sripur Jami Mosque built in the 1700s is regarded as part of Fulgazi's architectural heritage and is one of the 286 mosques in the sub-district.

== Administration ==
UNO: Taniya Bhuiyan.

Fulgazi Upazila was split off from Parshuram Upazila in 2002.

Fulgazi Upazila is divided into six union parishads: Amzadhat, Anandopur, Dorbarpur, Fulgazi, G.M. Hat, and Munshirhat. The union parishads are subdivided into 85 villages.

=== Chairman ===
List of chairman
Number	Name	Term
01	Ekramul Haque	2002-2014
02	Abdul Alim Mazumder	2014–2024
03	Harun Mazumder	2024-2024

== Notable people ==
- Khaleda Zia, first female prime minister of Bangladesh
- A. B. M. Musa, journalist
- Khurshid Jahan, politician
- Sayeed Iskander, politician
- Zafar Imam, Bengali freedom fighter and politician

== See also ==
- Upazilas of Bangladesh
- Districts of Bangladesh
- Divisions of Bangladesh
