= Academia School Dhaka =

Academia School
- Dhaka (8 campuses); Bangladesh

Information
- Type: School
- Motto: Outstanding English Medium School
- Established: 2002
- School board: British Curriculum
- Principal: Sarwat Zeb
- Head teacher: Md. Kutub Uddin
- Grades: Playgroup to A-Levels
- Gender: Male and Female
- Enrollment: July (July to next June)
- Language: English
- Colors: White and Vine Red
- Website: academiaschool.edu.bd

Academia is an English-medium school in Dhaka with multiple campuses in the city. It has campuses in Lalmatia, Dhanmondi, Mirpur, Gulshan, Uttara, Malibag, Wari, Nikunja, Bosila, Adabor and Banasree. It was established in 2002. The primary language of instruction is English. It offers classes from Playgroup to A-Levels. The school follows both Cambridge Assessment International Education (CAIE) & Pearson Edexcel Curriculum.

== O & A level results ==
No. of Students appearing through Academia over the last few years
| Session | Total Candidates | IGCSE/ O-Level | IAL/ A-Level |
|---|---|---|---|
| 2023 (Edexcel) | 713 | 385 | 328 |
| 2023 (CIE) | 747 | 269 | 478 |
| 2022 (Edexcel) | 1103 | 480 | 623 |
| 2022 (CIE) | 651 | 251 | 400 |
| 2021 (Edexcel) | 594 | 208 | 286 |
| 2021 (CIE) | 735 | 252 | 483 |
| 2020 (Edexcel) | 2411 | 1115 | 1296 |
| 2020 (CIE) | 462 | 201 | 261 |

Thousands of students appear for their O and A level examinations through Academia each year. Academia hosts a yearly ceremony to recognize their high achievers in O and A levels and has boasted a few hundred recipients in the past few years.

== Extra curricular activities: debating ==
Academia is well known for its prowess in English Debating: between 2015 and 2017, Academia Debate Club (ADC) won all 3 national championships, ranking as the best in Bangladesh. In addition, Academia students have represented Bangladesh at the World Schools Debating Championship in 2011, 2015, 2016, 2017 and 2019. Besides, Academia students have justified why they are amongst the top English Medium Schools in Bangladesh by winning a plethora of other debate and public speaking competitions over the years, one of the most notable being IUB Ascension—an international tournament held in Dhaka in 2019. In the process, they faced teams from IBA-DU, University of Oxford, IUT and other notable debating institutions across the world.

== Campuses ==
1. Lalmatia - Main Campus (House #6/10, Block-F, Satmasjid Road, Lalmatia, Dhaka-1207)
2. Dhanmondi (House #33, Road #9/A, Dhanmondi R/A, Dhaka-1209)
3. Mirpur (House #98, Road #2, Block-B, Mirpur Housing Estate, Mirpur-12, Dhaka-1216)
4. Wari (House19, 1B Larmini St, Dhaka 1203)
5. Uttara (House #71, Road #12, Sector-14, Uttara, Dhaka-1230)
6. Gulshan (House #23, Road #113, Bir Uttam H.M.A. Gaffar Road, Gulshan-2, Dhaka-1212)
7. Banasree (House #10, Block-F, Banasree Main Road, Rampura, Dhaka-1219)
8. Malibag (Plot-591, Shahid Baki Road, Block-C, Holding #891, Malibag Chowdhurypara, Khilgaon, Dhaka-1219)
