= Gulshan Lake =

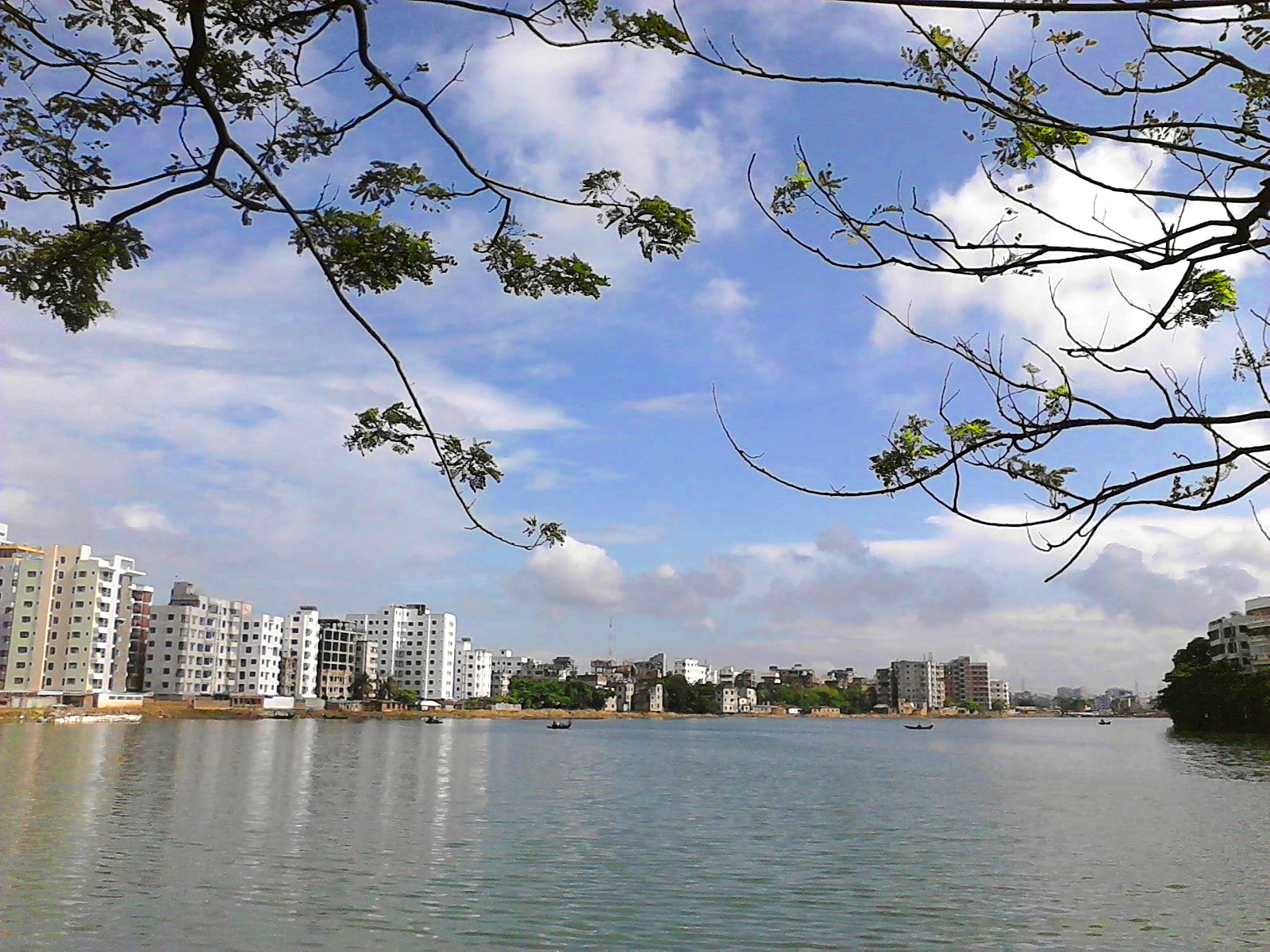
- View looking south from Gulshan Badda Link Rd, 2013

- Location within Bangladesh
- Location: Dhaka, Bangladesh
- Coordinates: 23.786°N 90.421°E
- Type: Lake

Gulshan Lake is a lake in Dhaka, Bangladesh, that borders Gulshan, Niketan, Badda, Shahjadpur and Baridhara Diplomatic Zone.

== History ==
In June 2015 Bangladesh High Court ordered the government to vacate portions of Gulshan lake that had been encroached upon. Since the July 2016 Dhaka attack, all boats have been removed from the lake. The government announced plans to introduce water taxis in the lake. In April 2017, the Capital Development Authority under the Ministry of Housing and Public Works destroyed a number of structures on the banks of the lake to make way for the building of pathway on the banks of the lake. Shahid Dr. Fazle Rabbi Park is near this lake.

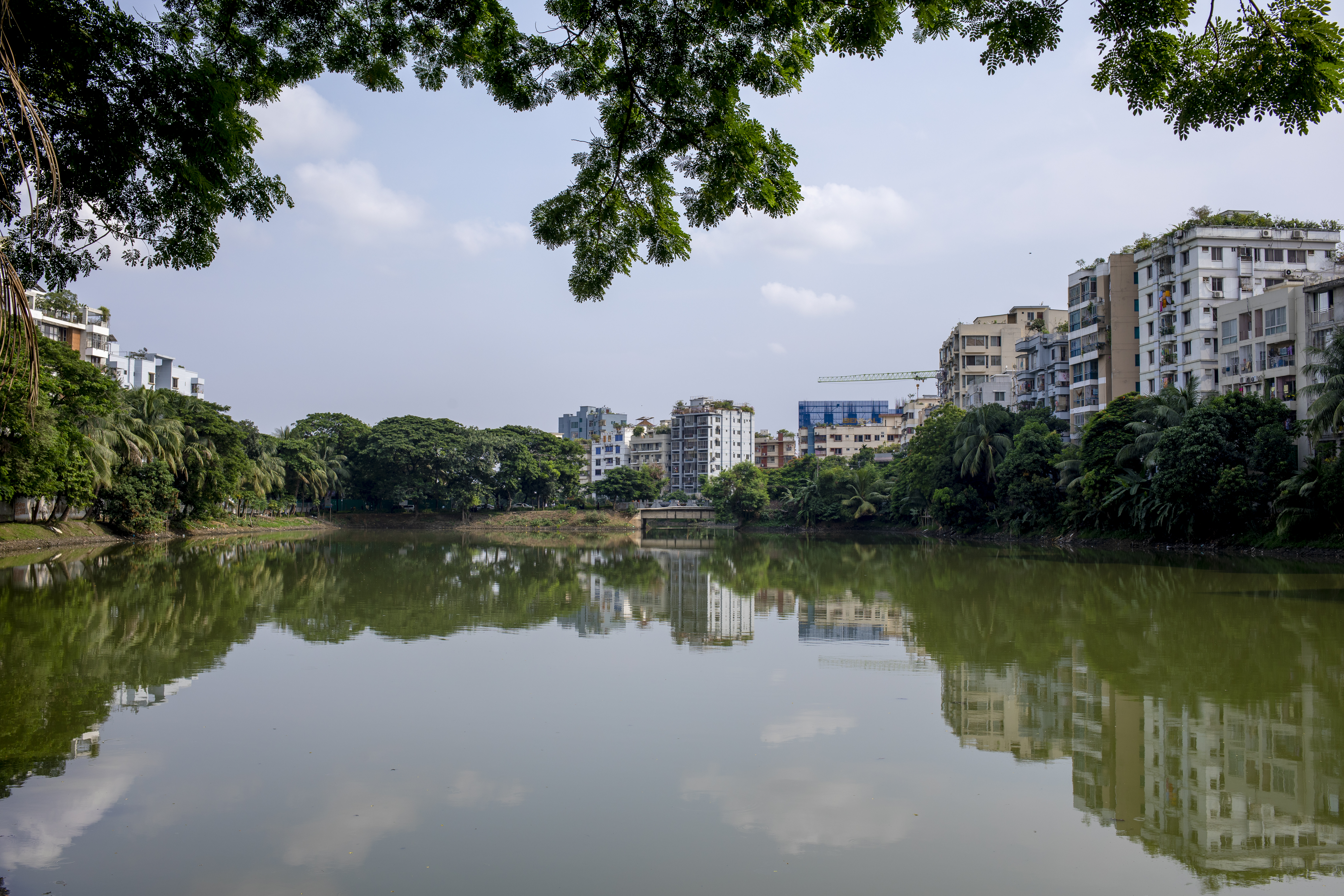
Gulshan Lake Dhaka

== Ecology ==
The lake has been declared by the city corporation as being "Ecologically Critical Area" in 2001. Direct dumping of sewage and water runoff had increased the pollution of the lake. The lake has also experienced an algal boom which has further reduced the oxygen available, harming the aquatic life.

== Gallery ==
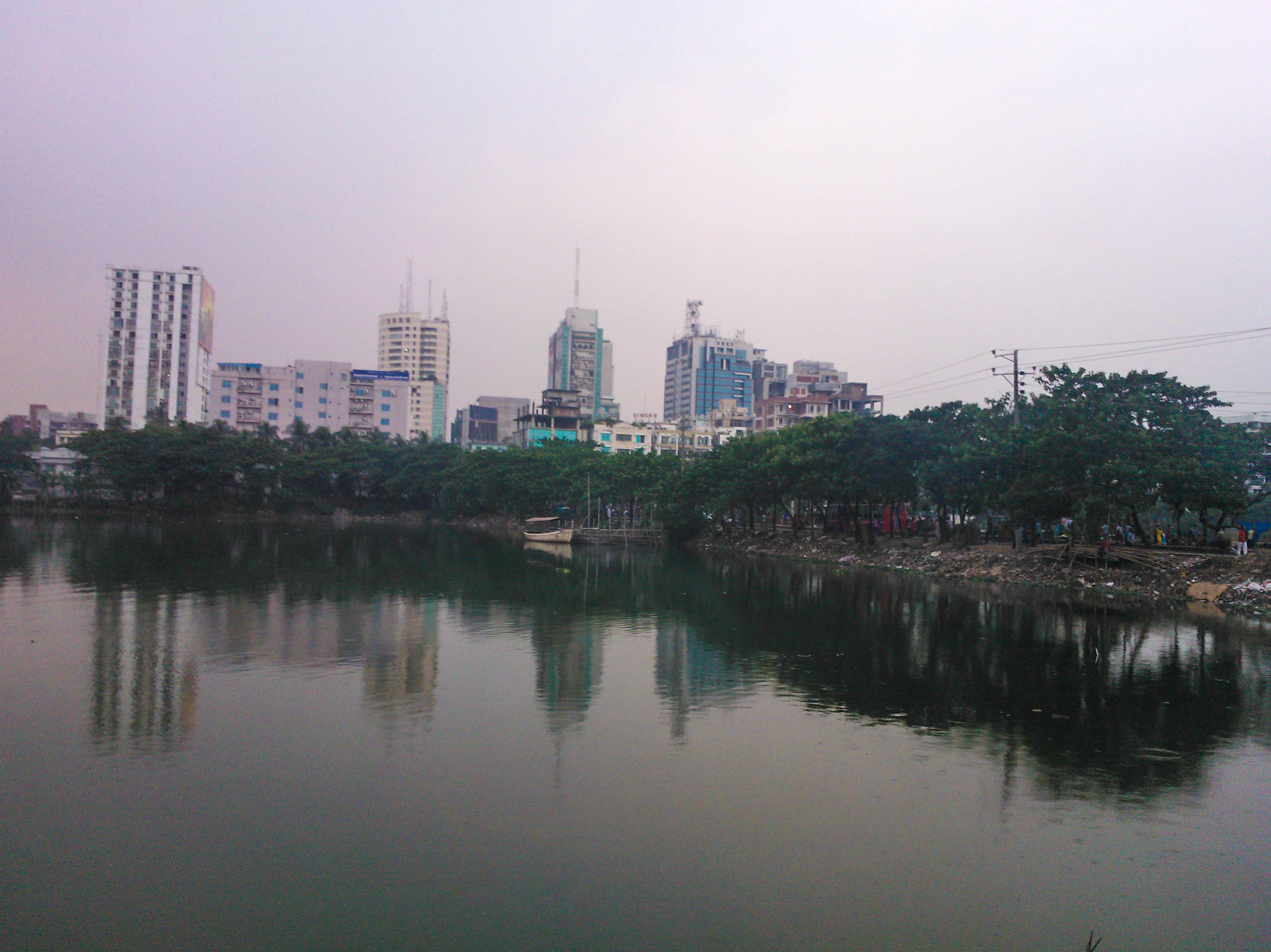

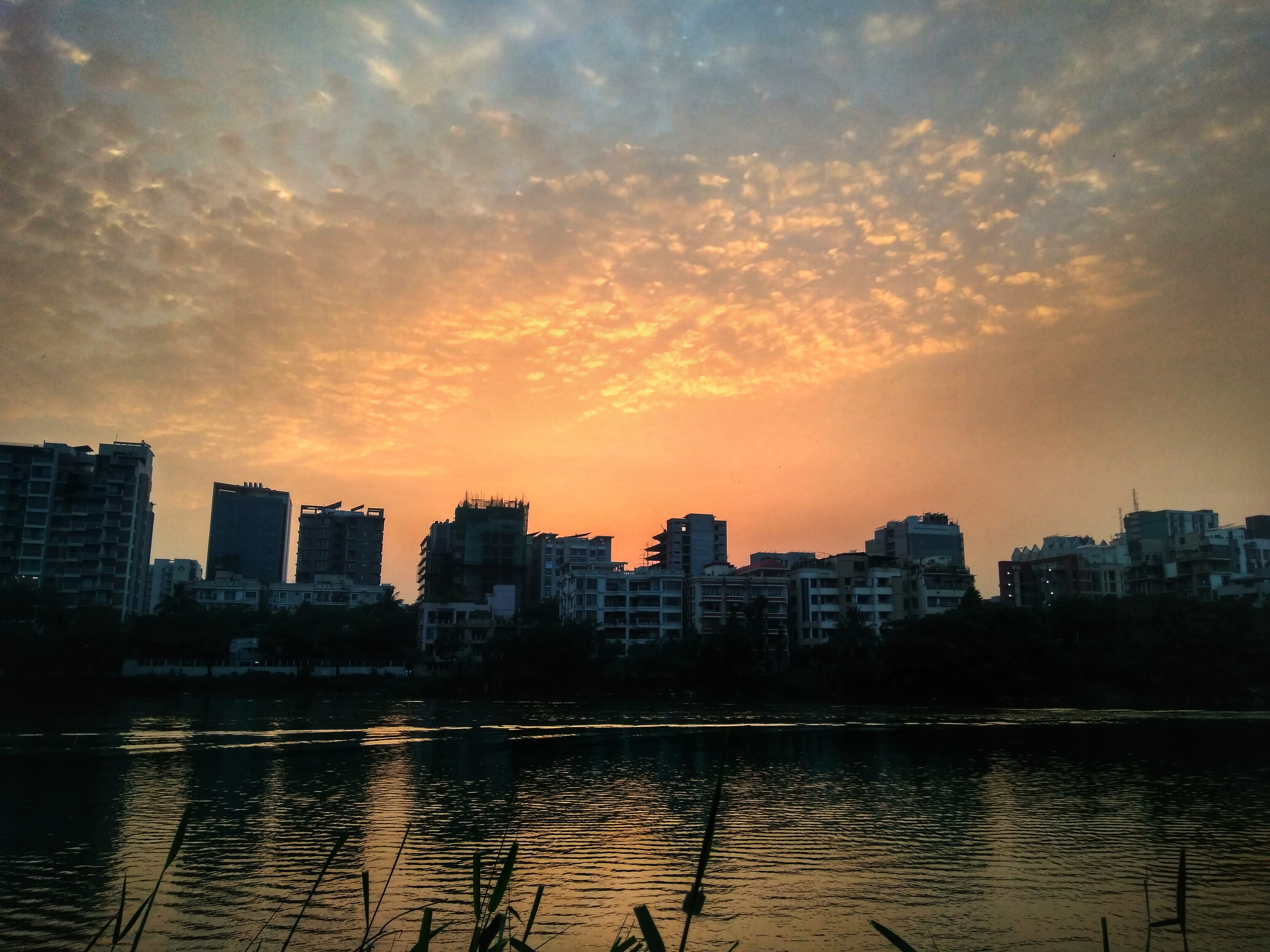

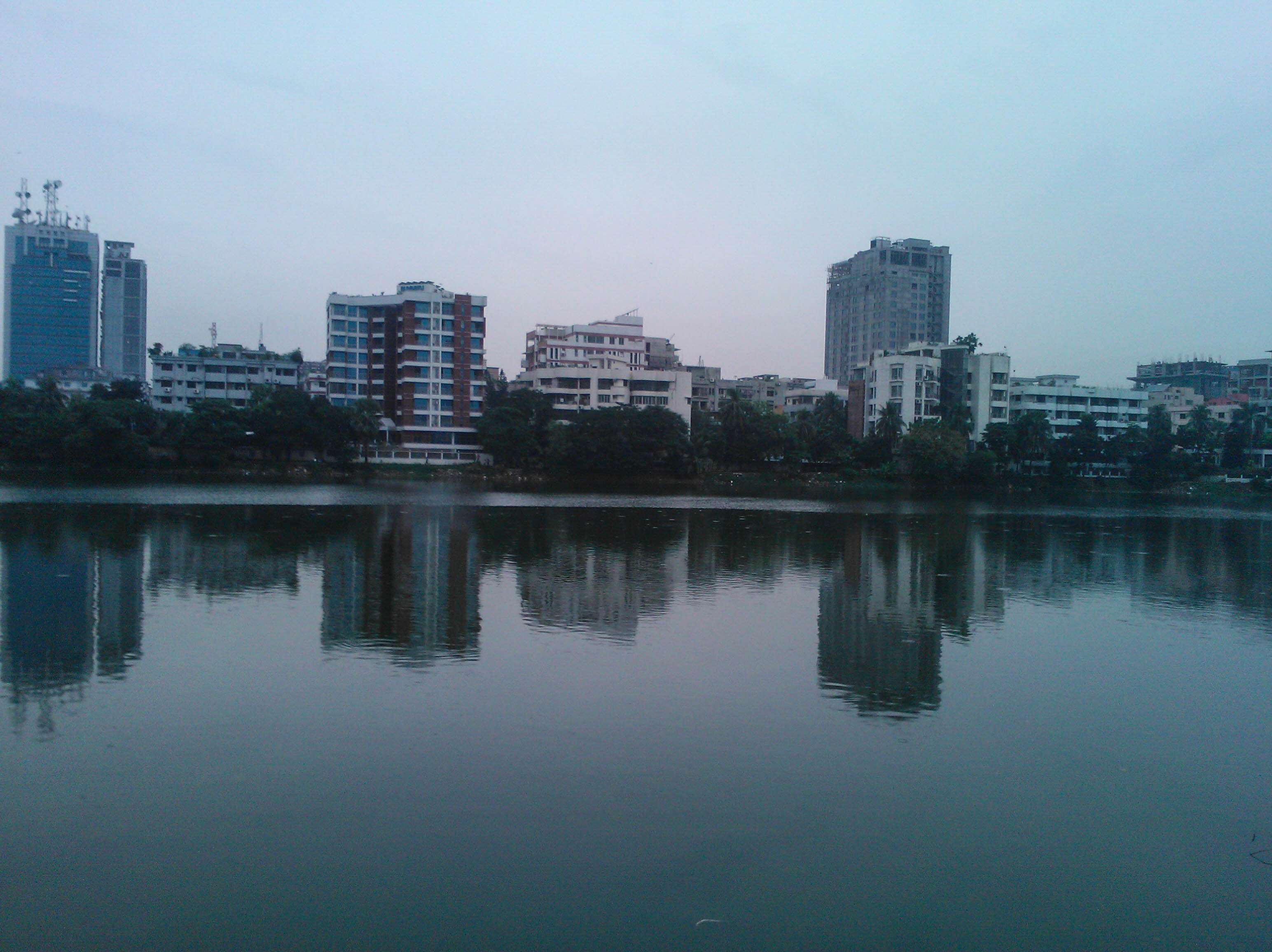

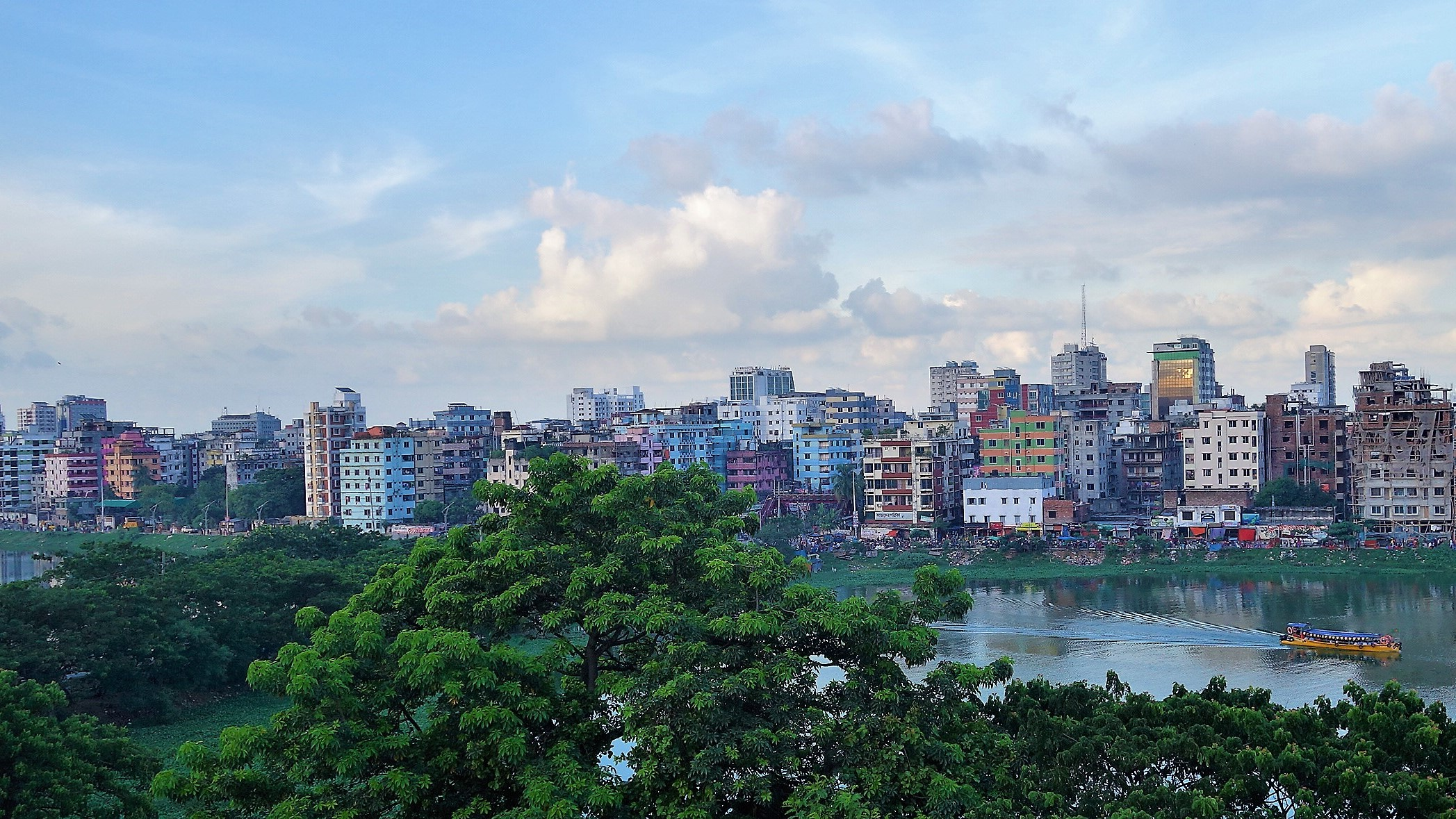
