= Gulshan Thana =

Thana and upscale area in Dhaka, Bangladesh

Gulshan Thana গুলশান থানা
- Thana
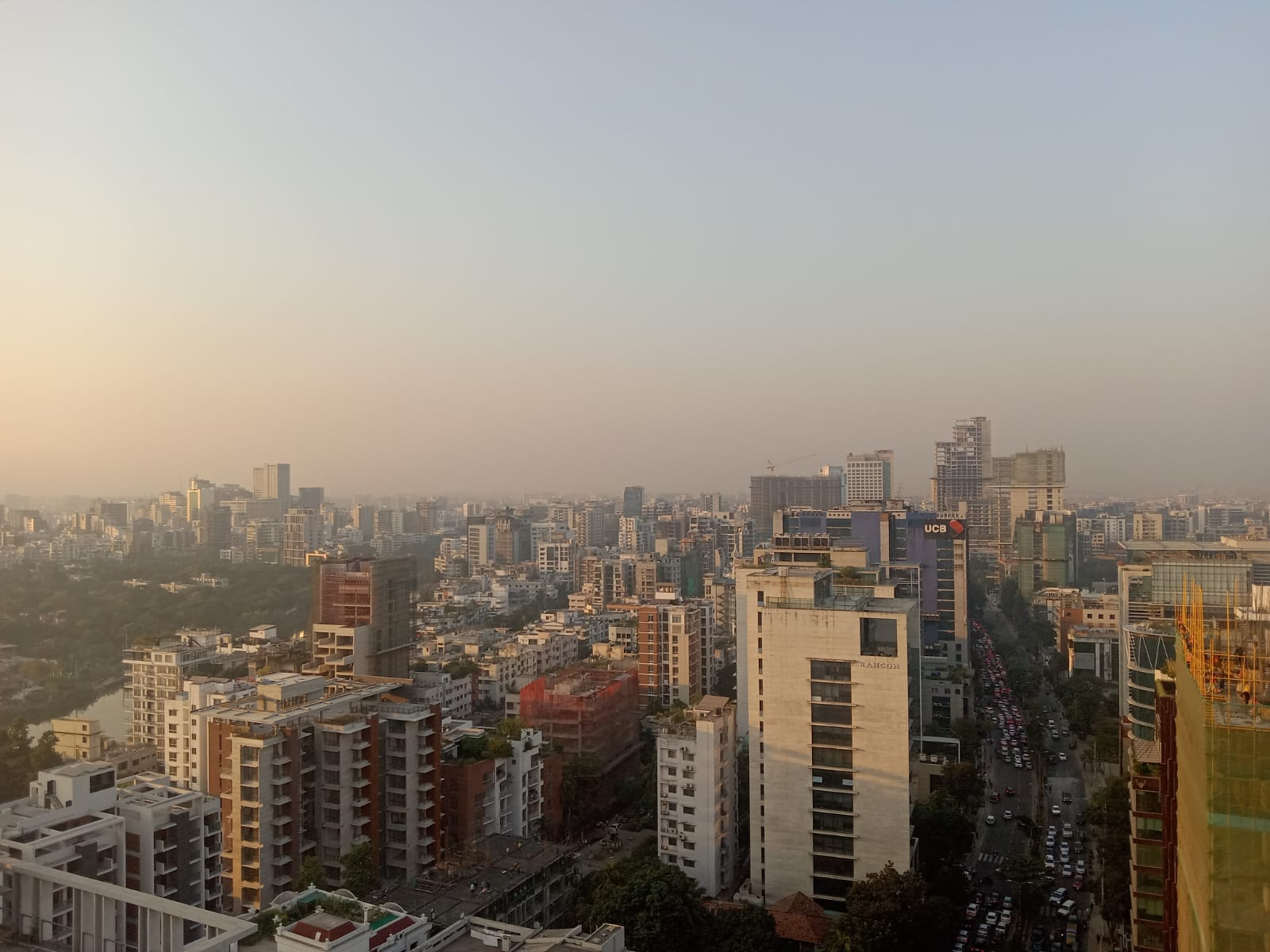
- Gulshan Avenue to Banani skyline
- Interactive map of Gulshan Thana
- Location of Gulshan Thana within Dhaka Location of Gulshan Thana within Dhaka Division Location of Gulshan Thana within Bangladesh
- Coordinates: 23.7917°N 90.4167°E
- Country: Bangladesh
- Division: Dhaka Division
- District: Dhaka District
- Local Government: Dhaka North City Corporation
- Police Station: Gulshan Avenue, Gulshan-2
- Ward: Ward No. 19, 20 (part)
- Gulshan Founded: 1961
- Thana Formed: 1972
- Parliament constituency: Dhaka-17

Area
  - Total: 8.85 km^{2} (3.42 sq mi)
- Elevation: 23 m (75 ft)

Population (2022)
  - Total: 110,213
  - Density: 12,500/km^{2} (32,300/sq mi)
- Time zone: UTC+6 (BST)
- Postal code: 1212
- Area code: 02

Gulshan (Bengali: গুলশান) is an affluent residential and commercial neighbourhood, as well as a thana (police jurisdiction) in Dhaka, Bangladesh.

Originally a rural settlement called Bhola Gram, the area was developed in the early 1960s into an upscale suburban neighbourhood with planned housing and infrastructure. Gulshan underwent a major transformation beginning in the 1990s, evolving into a dense urban zone with high-rise buildings, shopping centres, banks, hotels, private clubs, and diplomatic missions. Today, it is home to a number of the city's restaurants, five-star hotels, shopping centres, schools, banks, offices, and clubs. It also hosts the majority of foreign embassies and high commissions in Bangladesh. Offices of many Bangladeshi and international companies are located in Gulshan.

== History ==
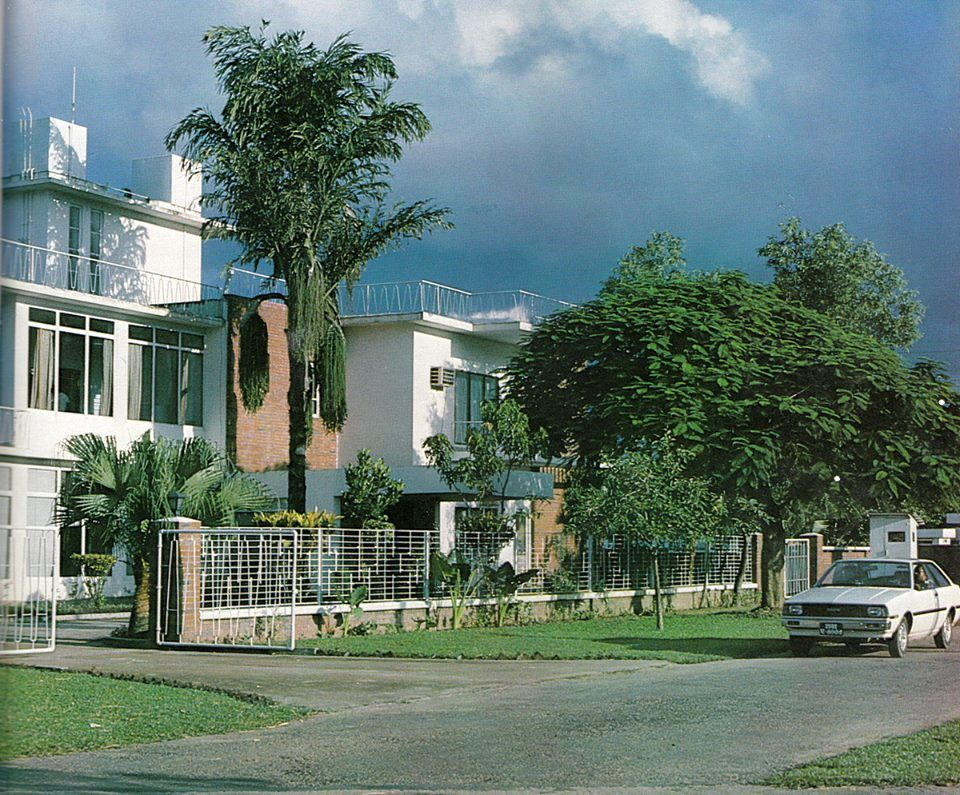
Gulshan neighbourhood, 1980s

Until 1961, the area now known as Gulshan (meaning "garden") was a rural settlement outside of Dhaka called Bhola Gram or Bhola Samair (Bengali: ভোলা সামাইর), inhabited by migrants from Bhola District in Barishal. It featured croplands, dense vegetation, and water bodies used for fishing. The Dhaka Improvement Trust (DIT), under G.A. Madani, selected the site for the Gulshan Model Town project, aiming to develop a planned residential area inspired by a similar neighbourhood in Karachi. As affluent residents began acquiring land and constructing homes, the area's rural character gradually transformed. During this period, Gulshan was designated a union and later upgraded to a municipality. The previous inhabitants were relocated to nearby locations such as Badda, Notun Bazar, and Gazipur. Around 1972, Gulshan and surrounding areas were organised under the newly formed Gulshan Thana. In 1982, the municipality was absorbed into Dhaka Municipality as a ward.

Initially developed as a residential area with one- and two-storey houses, Gulshan began to see the construction of high-rise buildings in the 1990s. Like other parts of Dhaka, it evolved into a densely developed urban zone, featuring street lighting, security checkposts, high-rise residences, kitchen markets, shopping malls, brand outlets, banks, clubs, gyms, and hotels. Diplomatic missions and residences also expanded eastward into Baridhara, while surrounding areas grew in significance.

Rapid development continued into the following decade, leading the government in 2004 to officially permit commercial establishments in designated parts of Gulshan. This policy shift triggered a sharp rise in the number of commercial buildings, shops, and a significant increase in land and property prices.

Banani was a part of Gulshan Thana, but was separated with the establishment of Banani Thana. Despite this, Banani and Gulshan are often referred together as "Gulshan–Banani", due to their proximity, same characteristics and history and being in the same thana, before the establishment of Banani Thana.

== Geography ==
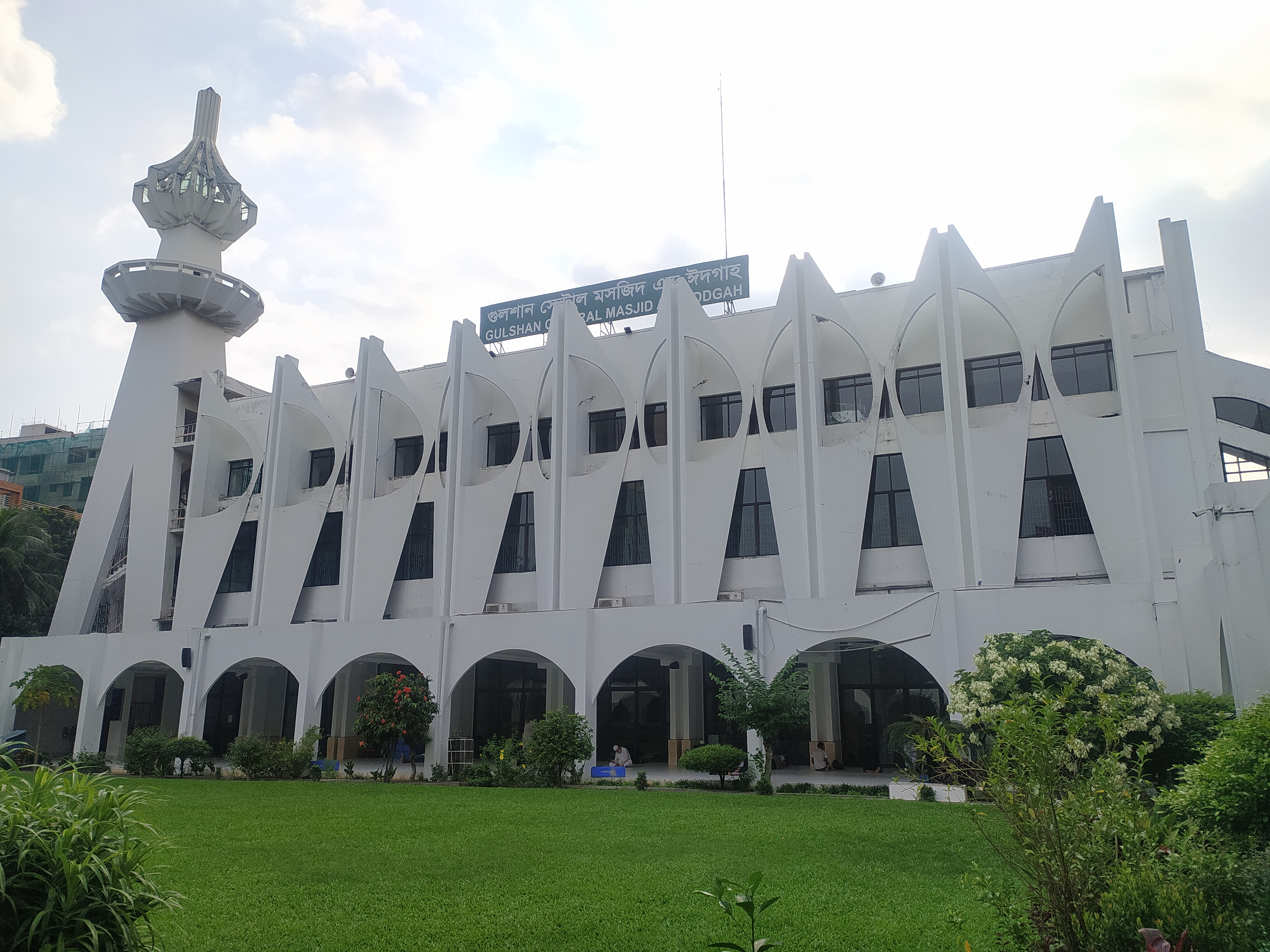
Gulshan Central Mosque is the largest mosque in North Dhaka

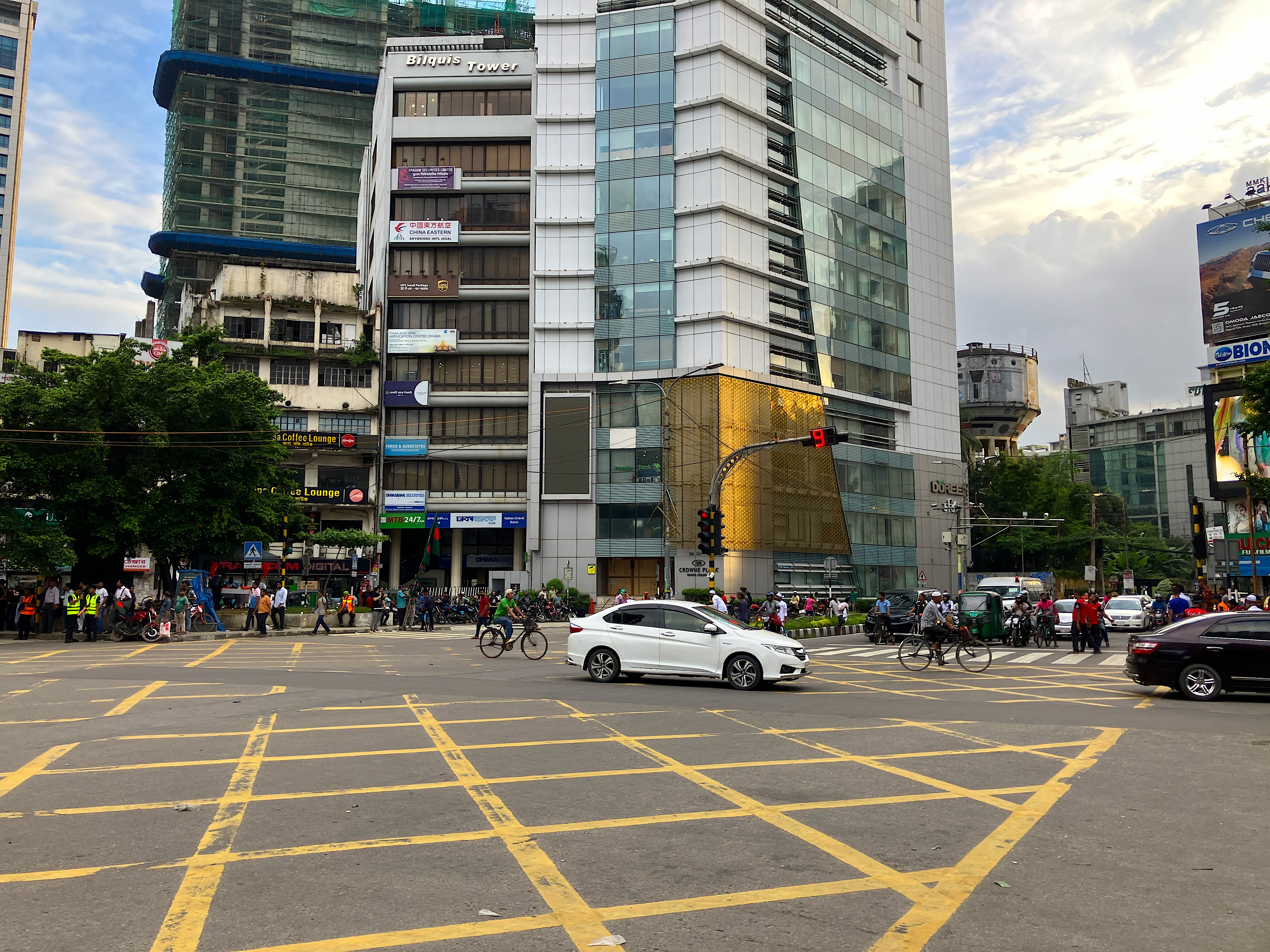
Gulshan 2 circle

The Gulshan Thana comprises an area of 8.85 km^{2}, consisting of the entire ward 18, parts of ward 19 and only one area of ward 20, including Gulshan Model Town, consisting of Gulshan circle 1 and circle 2, Baridhara Diplomatic Zone, and Niketan. 50% of the area is residential, 20% commercial and 12% is the diplomatic area. 18% of land in Gulshan consists of other areas, including slums, of which the biggest is the Korail slum. The Gulshan Lake, is also located in the area.

Gulshan is a commercial and residential area, originally meant for offices and embassies of diplomatic missions, as well as residences. The area has seen an upsurge in the number of high-rise buildings, restaurants, residential areas, modern markets and ice-cream parlors since the mid-1990s. The independent houses of the early 1970s that stood far from each other in the Gulshan area have vanished because of the commercial boom, to the point that older residents claim it is no longer a residential area.

Though Gulshan, Banani and Baridhara, as well as Uttara and other satellite towns like Bashundhara, are relatively on higher lands, substantial parts of the Gulshan Thana area remained underwater for a prolonged duration during the 1998 Bangladesh floods. Dhaka WASA conducted a survey to investigate the causes of and remedial measures in 1998 with a particular focus on the Gulshan Lake and the Gulshan and Banani canals. Flood water runoff flows into these water bodies practically turning these into buffer flood control reservoirs, except for some pockets of transient water-logging. Drains and sewerage pipes dumping wastes in the Gulshan lake has been identified as major pollution problem by DWASA. The malodorous wastes tend to spill over when the roads are flooded.

== Demographics ==
Religions in Gulshan Thana (2022)
Religion	Percent
Islam	87.38%
Christianity	8.01%
Hinduism	3.41%
Buddhism	1.00%
Other or not stated	0.21%

According to the 2022 Bangladeshi census, Gulshan Thana had 30,002 households and a population of 110,216. 5.14% of the population were under 5 years of age. Gulshan had a literacy rate (age 7 and over) of 90.54%: 92.97% for males and 87.42% for females, and a sex ratio of 125.71 males for every 100 females.

According to the 2011 Census of Bangladesh, Gulshan Thana had 54,215 households with an average household size of 4.14 and a population of 253,050. Males constituted 55.45% (140,322) of the population while females 44.55% (112,728). Gulshan Thana had a literacy rate (age 7 and over) of 74.8%, compared to the national average of 51.8%, and a sex ratio of 124.There were 1,743 floating people in this jurisdiction.

The religious breakdown was Muslim 91.37% (231,208), Hindu 3.97% (10,045), Christian 3.88% (9,809), Buddhist 0.67% (1686), and others 0.12% (302). The ethnic minority people living there were 3,891 individuals in total.

== Urban layout ==
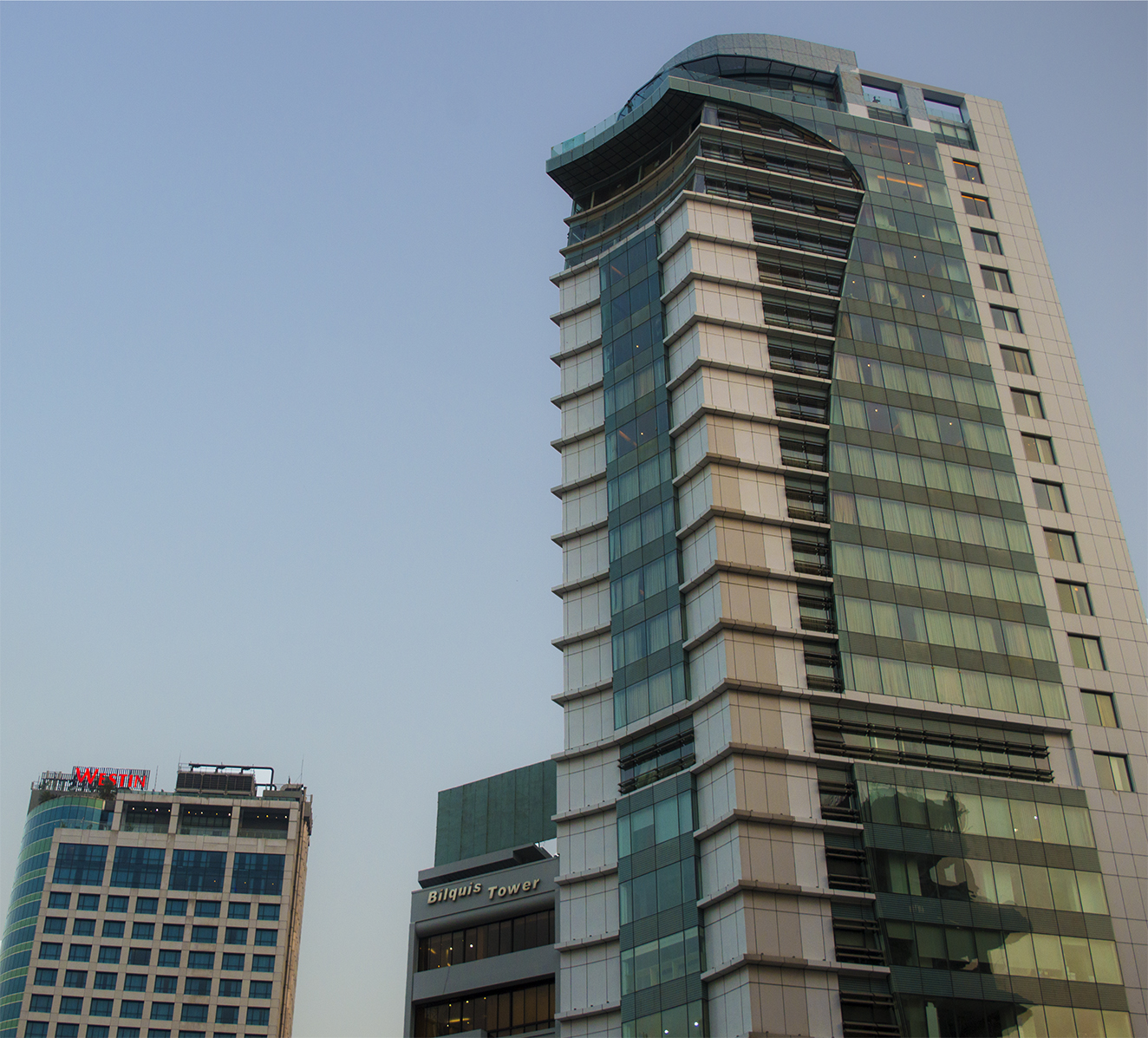
Westin and Crowne Plaza hotels in Gulshan 2

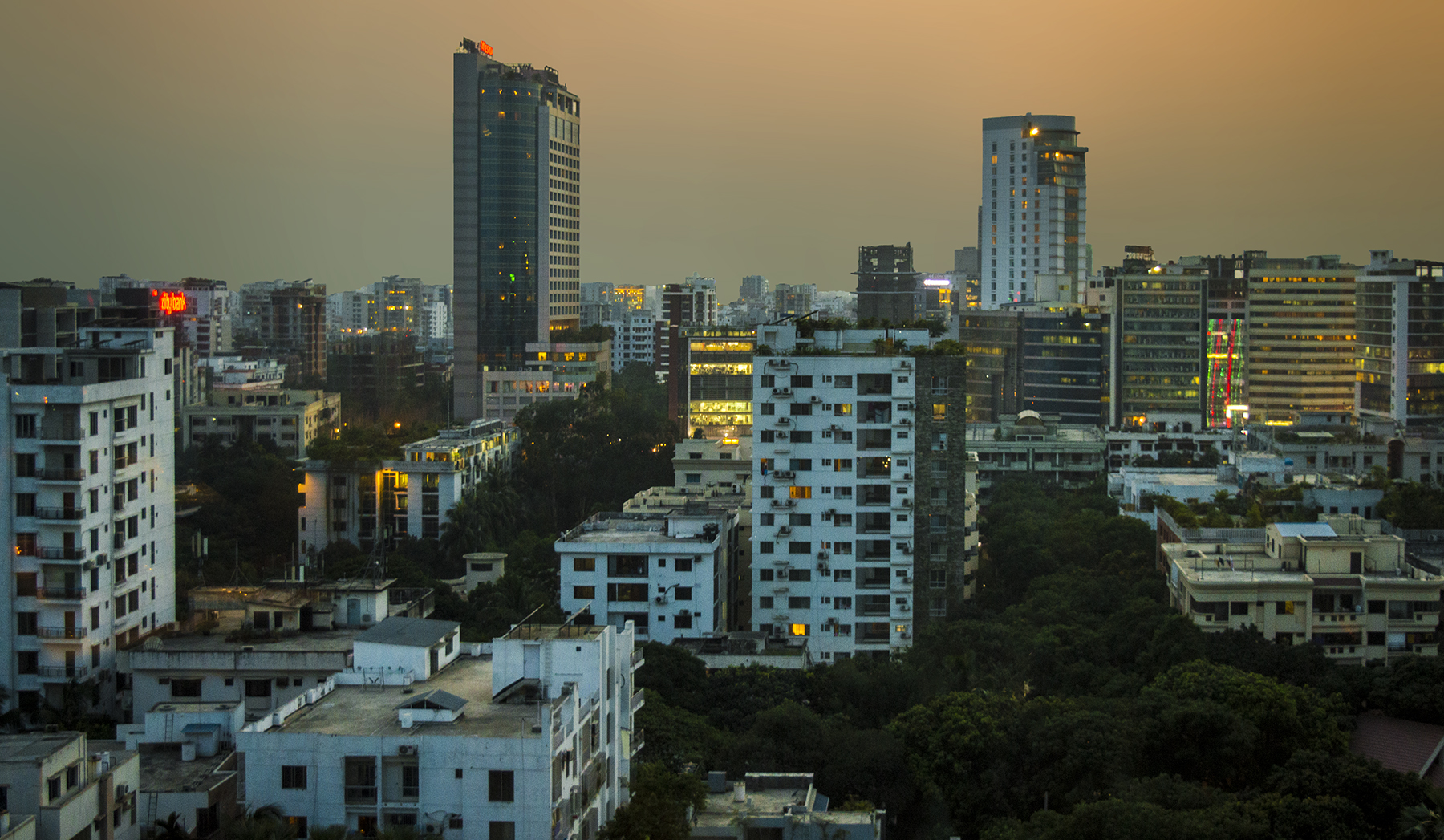
Apartment blocks and commercial offices in Gulshan 2

Thoroughfares in the area are beautified by major cellphone companies of Bangladesh. There are 25 mosques in this area, including Gulshan Azad Mosque and Gulshan Society Mosque. The area features a number of churches and Christian missions, including that of the Missionaries of Charity. There are some public urban parks in this area including Justice Shahabuddin Ahmed Park and Shahid Dr. Fazle Rabbi Park.

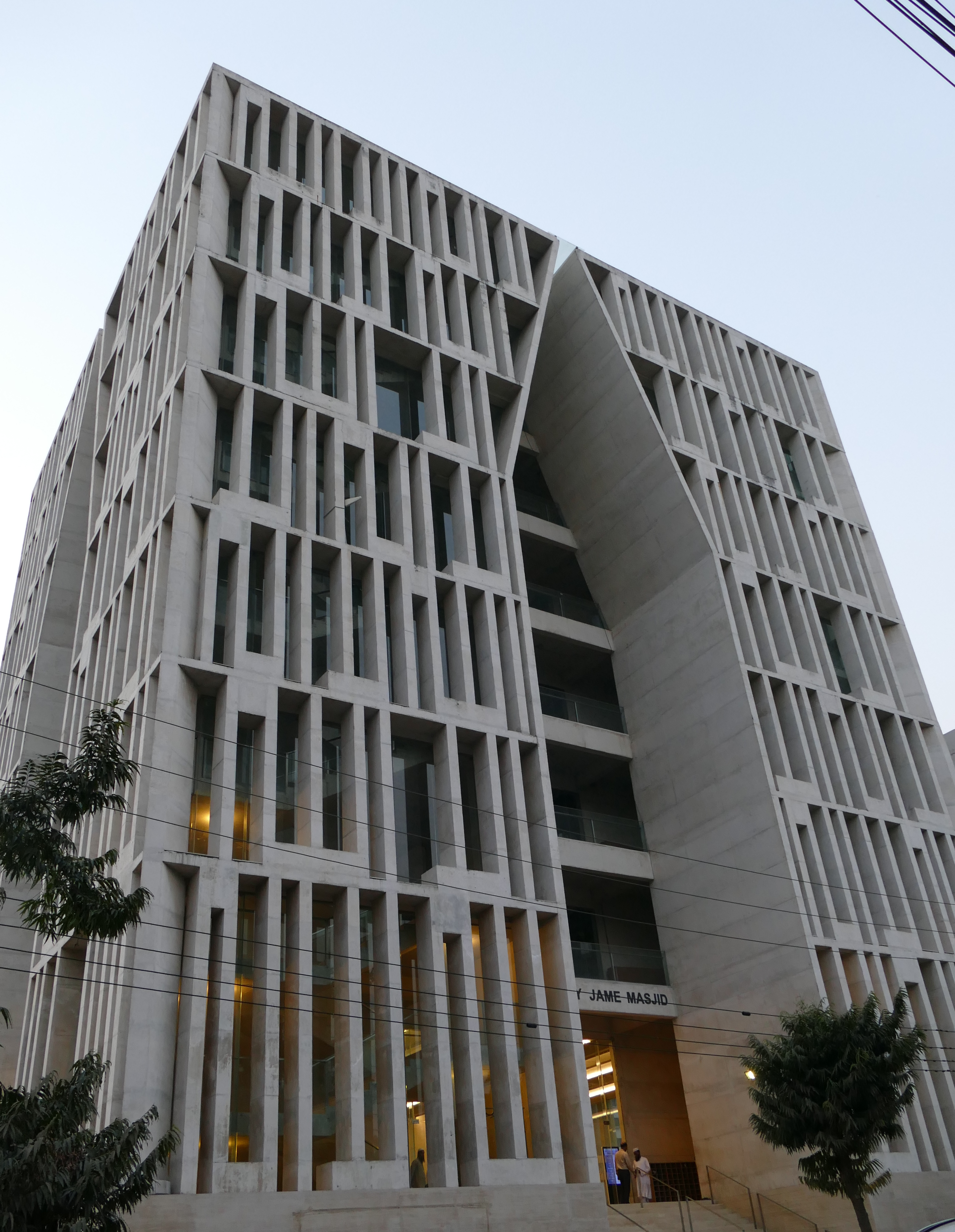
Gulshan Society Mosque

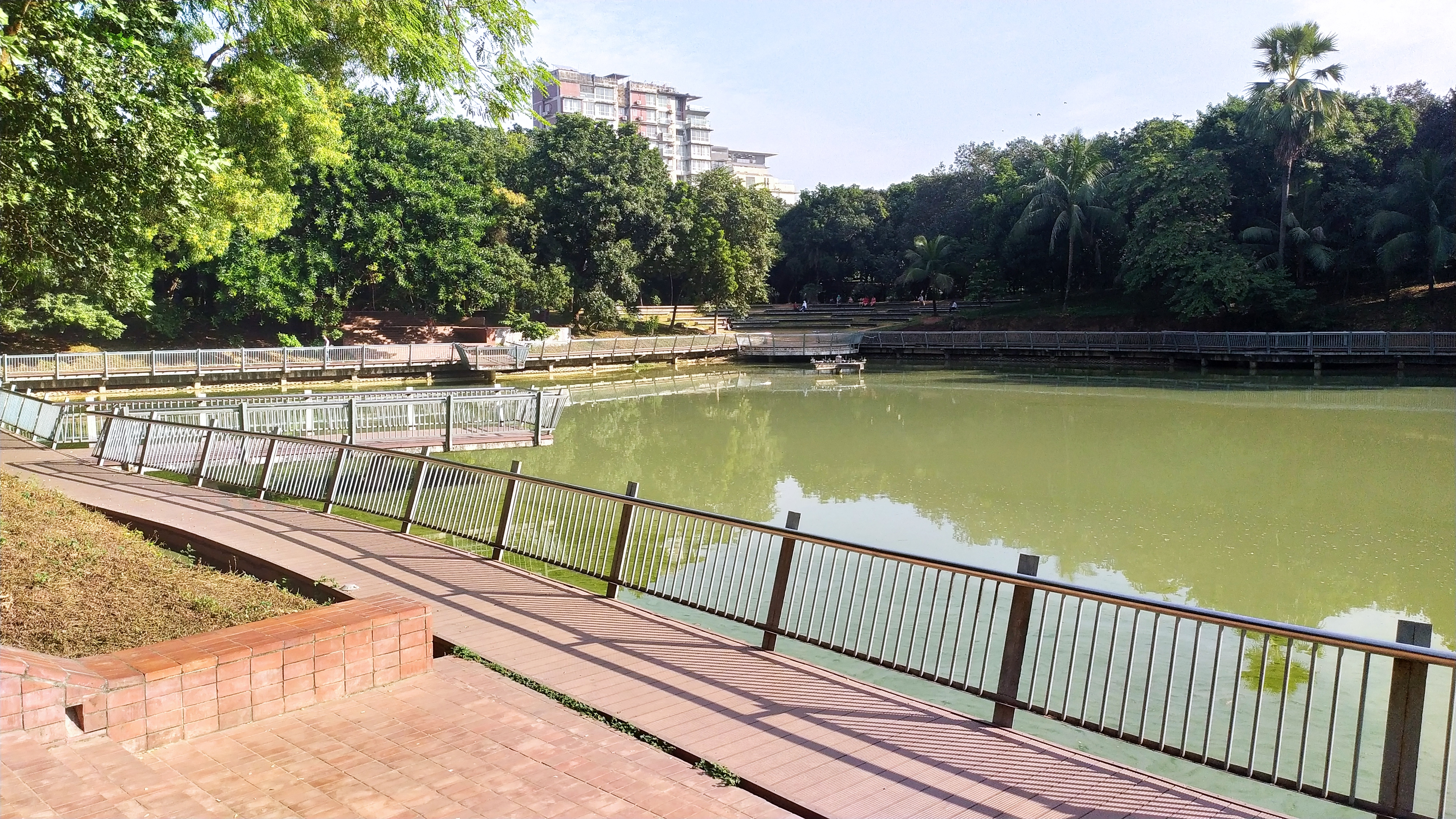
Justice Shahabuddin Ahmed Park, Gulshan-2

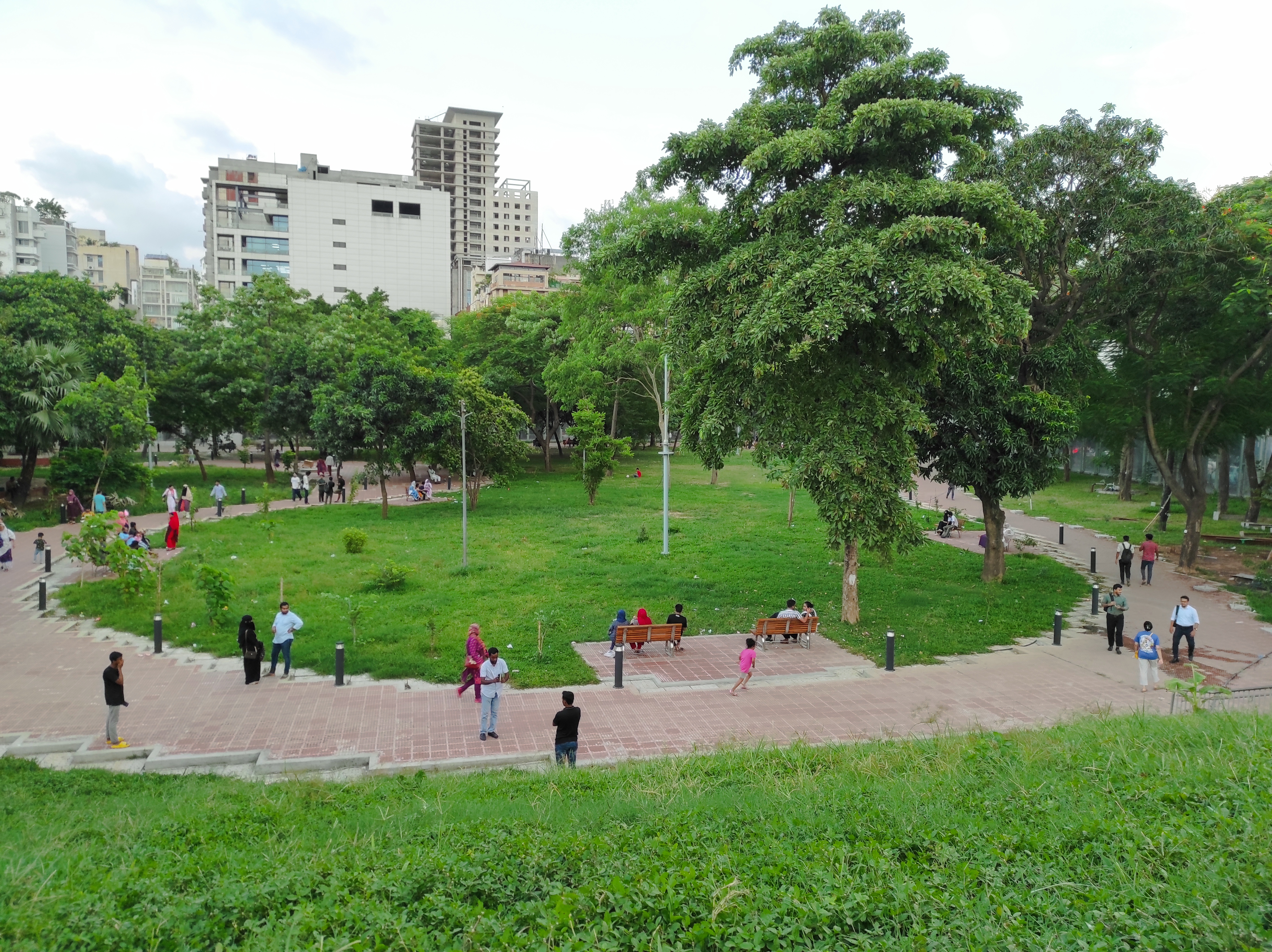
Shahid Dr. Fazle Rabbi Park Gulshan-1, Niketan

=== Commercial activities ===
Many local and multinational companies have their local headquarters located in Gulshan, including Nokia, Banglalink, Augere, Standard Chartered Bank, P&G, GSK, Reckitt Benckiser, Mahindra & Mahindra Ltd., The Himalaya Drug Company, Siemens, Adidas, Nokia Siemens Networks, Sony Ericsson, Ericsson, Coca-Cola, PepsiCo, The Coca-Cola Company and Microsoft.

There are some 45 boutiques, markets, bazaars and shopping centers in Gulshan. There also are many mega-stores and shopping malls and a plethora of food, bank and fashion outlets located all over the area.

=== Entertainment ===
The area hosts a number of private clubs. While the Gulshan Club and International Club have their own policies, most of the rest are sponsored by the various diplomatic missions. These include the American Recreation Association (American Club), the Canadian Club, the Dutch Club, the Australian Club (membership are also available to New Zealanders), the Nordic Club (membership available to citizens of Scandinavian countries) and the German Club (membership available to EU citizens). The BAGHA (British Aid Guest House Association) Club falls under the British High Commission umbrella and also accepts membership from EU citizens. While it is not a club as such, the quarters of the American Embassy's Marine Guard unit maintains a small private bar.

There is a 250-room five star hotel, Westin, located at circle-2.

=== Health ===
The headquarters of icddr,b is in Mahakhali. Gulshan Mother and Child Clinic (Gulshan Maa O Shishu Clinic), Gulshan Group Clinic, Retina and Eye Center, DNS Diagnostics and Telemedicine, Sikder's Women's Hospital, Ear Care Center, and Balaka Pharmacy are located in Gulshan Model Town. The Dental Studio, and Sarah Dental Clinic are also in the area. There are also Japan Bangladesh Friendship Hospital in Gulshan, Aysha Memorial Specialized Hospital and LifeLine in Mohakhali, and Nova Medical Center, Peerless Diagnostic & Treatment Centre. There also Midway Clinic, Adventist Dental Clinic, Modern Clinic & Blood Center and Shifa Pharmacy in Gulshan, Christian Medical Hospital in Baridhara, and Metropolitan Medical Center and Marie Stopes Clinic in Mohakhali.

=== Diplomatic missions ===
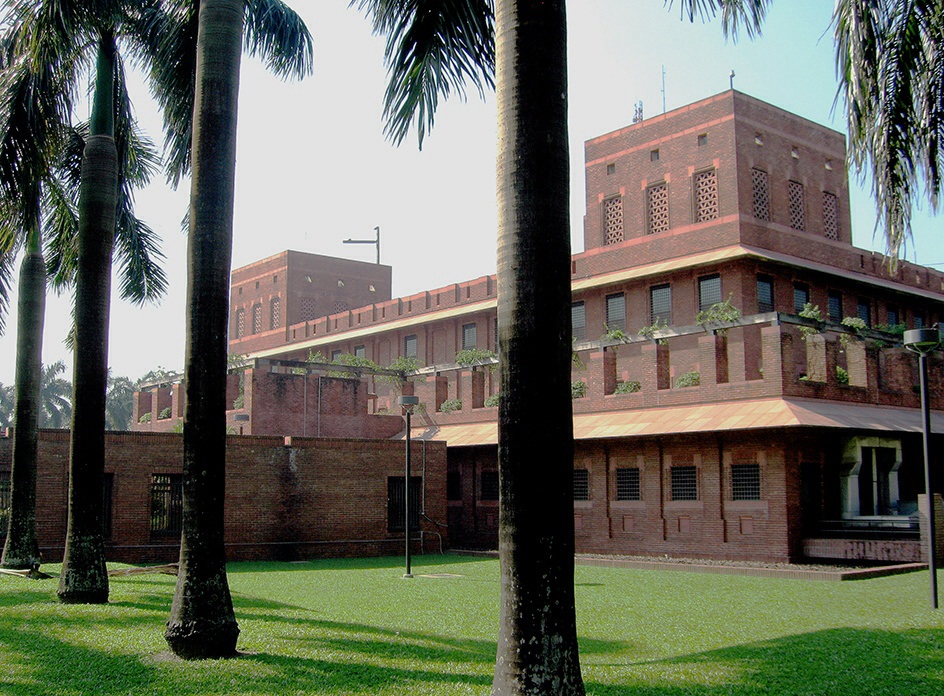
U.S. Embassy, Dhaka

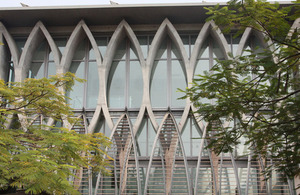
British High Commission, Dhaka

- Embassy of the Islamic Republic of Afghanistan
- Australian High Commission
- Embassy of the Kingdom of Belgium
- Royal Bhutanese Embassy
- Canadian High Commission
- Embassy of the People's Republic of China
- Royal Danish Embassy
- Embassy of the Arab Republic of Egypt
- Embassy of the Republic of France
- Embassy of the Federal Republic of Germany
- Embassy of the Republic of Hungary
- Embassy of the Republic of Indonesia
- Embassy of the Republic of Italy
- Embassy of the State of Kuwait
- The People's Bureau of the Great Socialist People's Libyan Arab Jamahiriya
- Malaysian High Commission
- Embassy of the Union of Myanmar
- Royal Netherlands Embassy
- Royal Norwegian Embassy
- High Commission for the Islamic Republic of Pakistan
- Embassy of the State of Palestine
- Embassy of the Republic of the Philippines
- Embassy of the Republic of Poland
- Embassy of the State of Qatar
- Embassy of the Russian Federation
- Embassy of Romania
- Embassy of Saudi Arabia
- Consulate of the Republic of Singapore
- Embassy of the Kingdom of Spain
- The High Commission of the Democratic Socialist Republic of Sri Lanka
- Embassy of Sweden
- Royal Thai Embassy
- Embassy of the Republic of Turkey
- Embassy of the United Arab Emirates
- British High Commission
- Embassy of the United States of America
- Consular Agency of the Republic of Uzbekistan
- Delegation of the European Commission

== Education ==
=== Universities ===
- Manarat International University (2001)
- Presidency University (2003)

=== Schools ===
- American Standard International School (ASIS)
- Australian International School
- Bangladesh International Tutorial (BIT)
- Academia School Dhaka
- Green Dale International School
- Manarat
- Scholastica

== Gallery ==
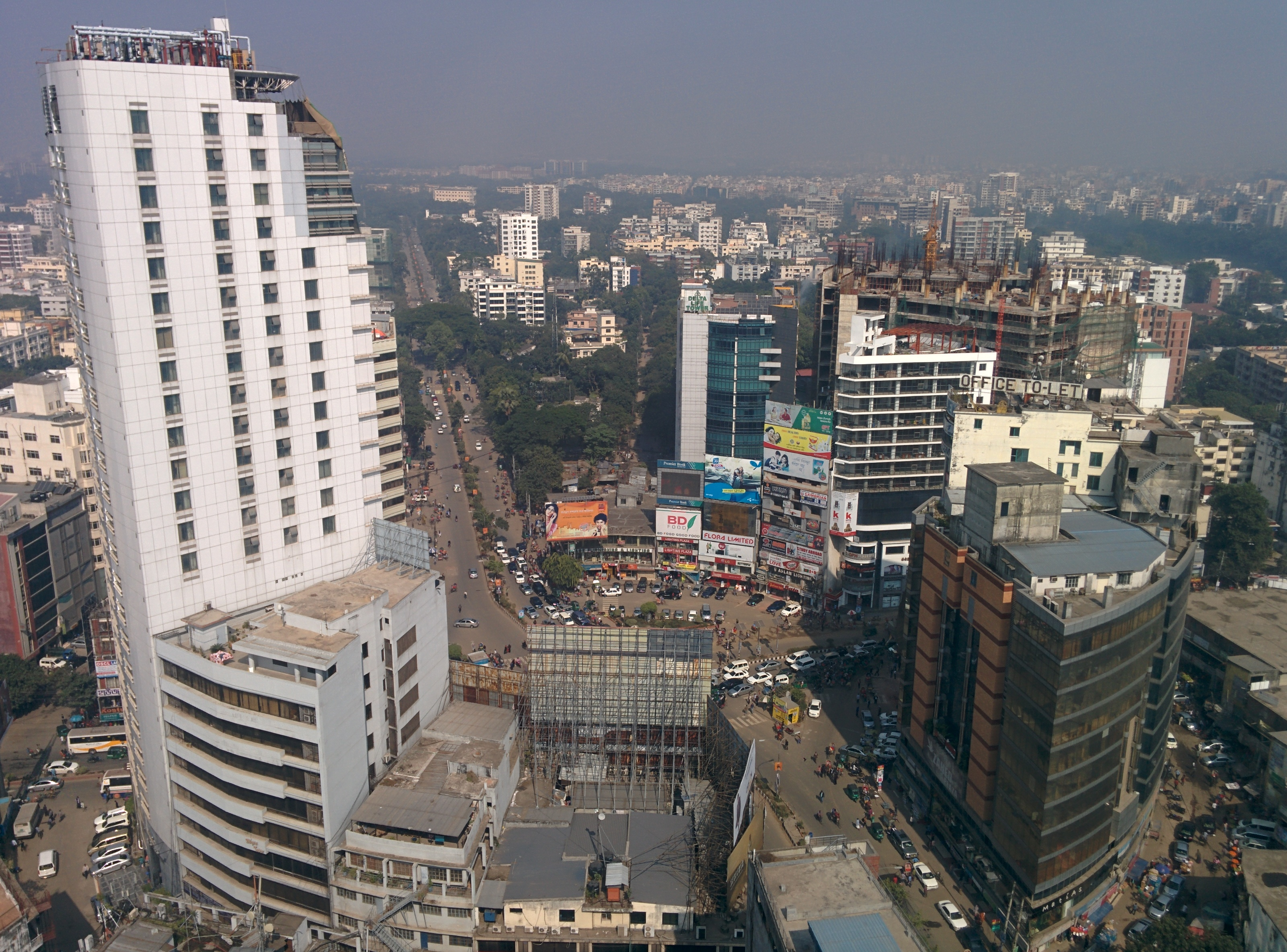
Gulshan 2 Circle Skyline

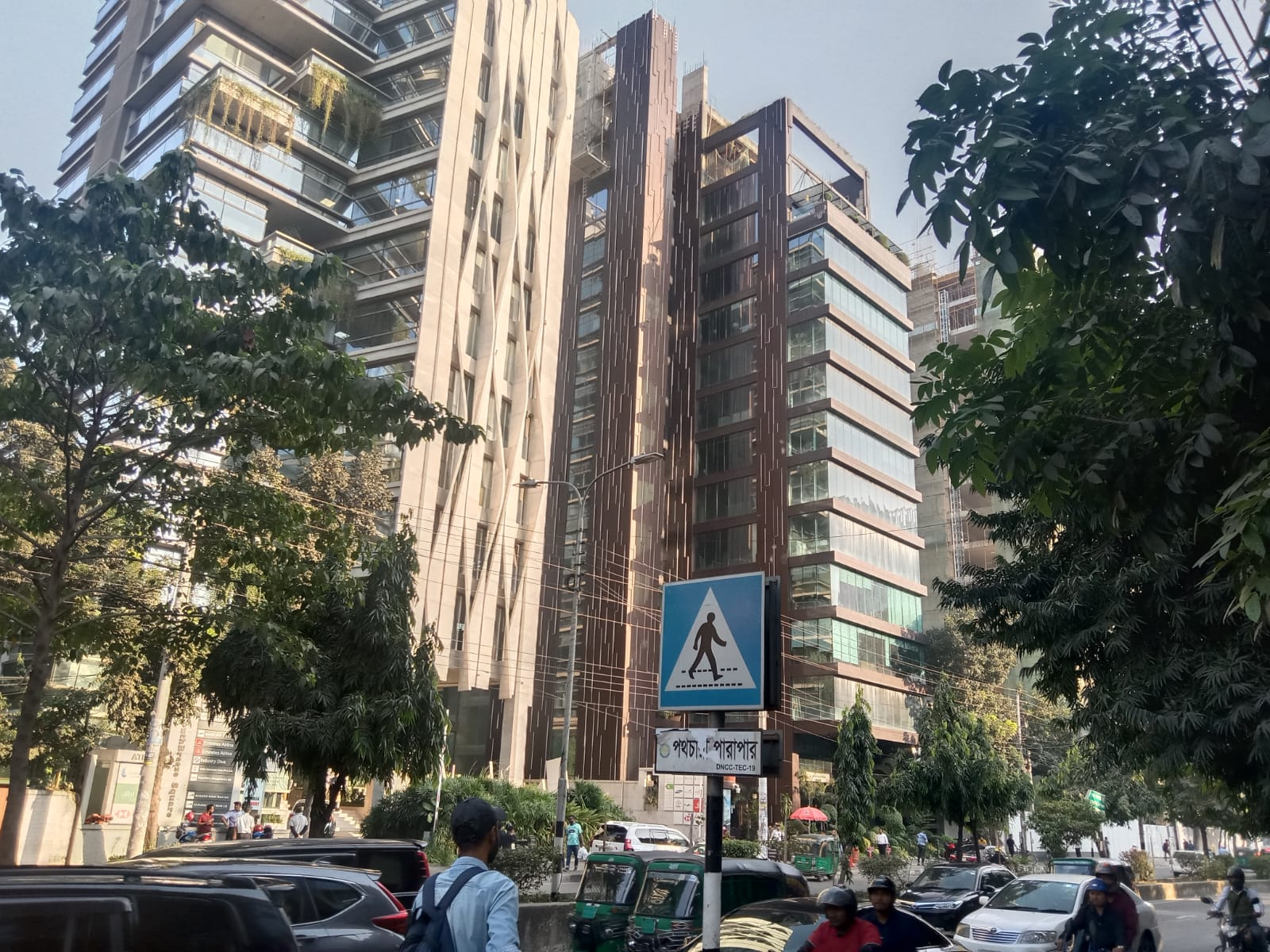
Buildings in the Gulshan Avenue

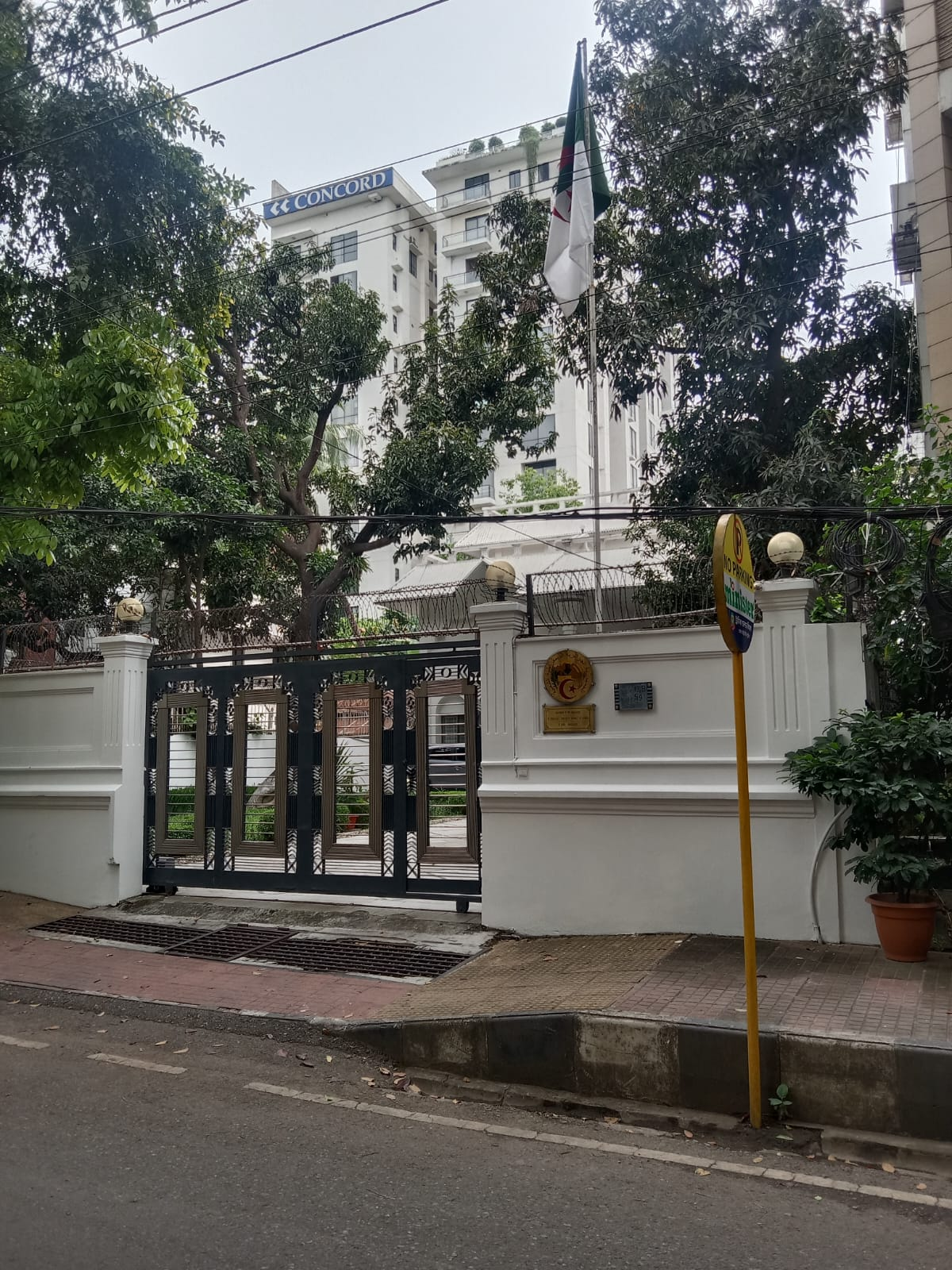
Residence of the Algerian ambassador to Bangladesh

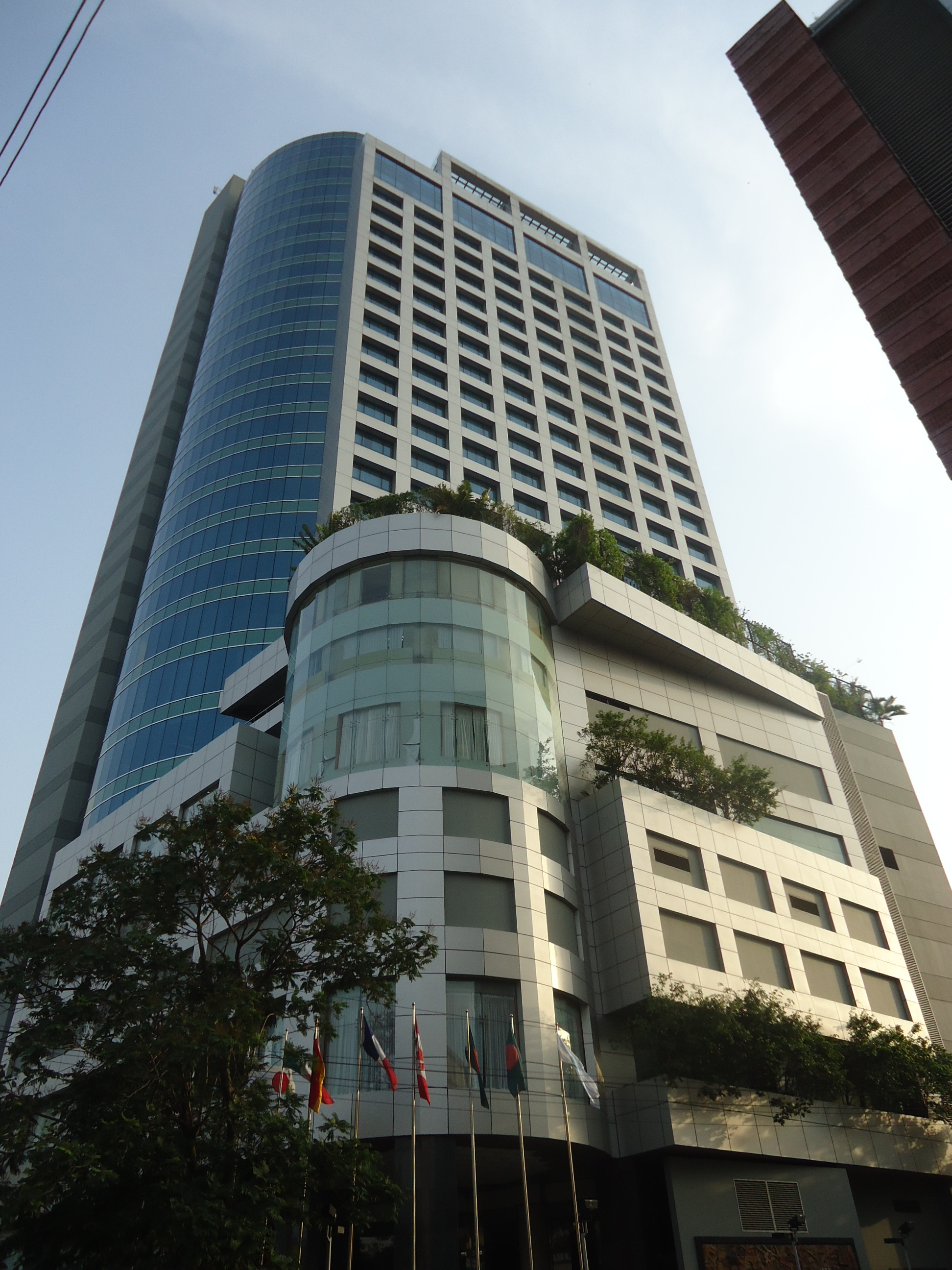
The Westin Dhaka

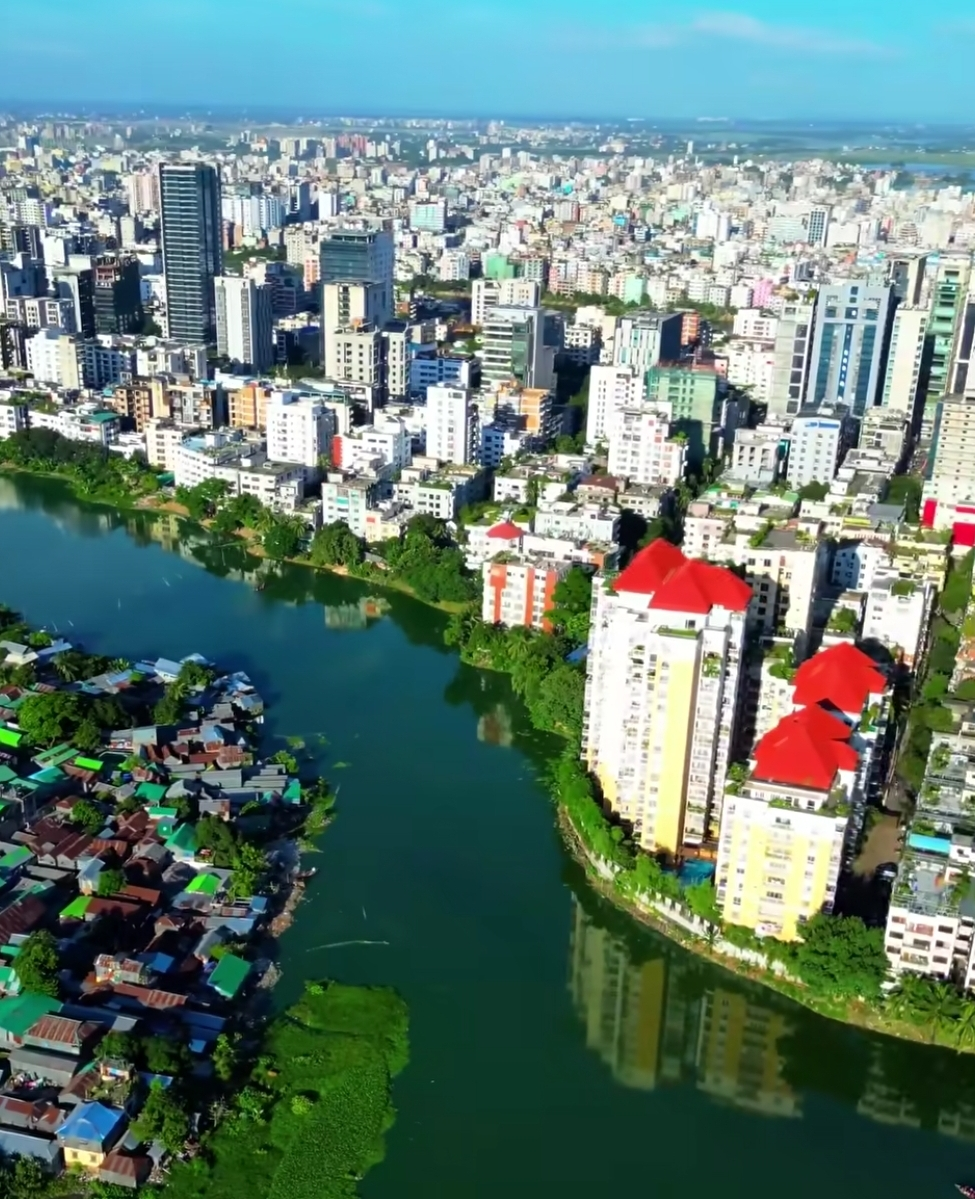
Gulshan 1, overlooking from Mohakhali

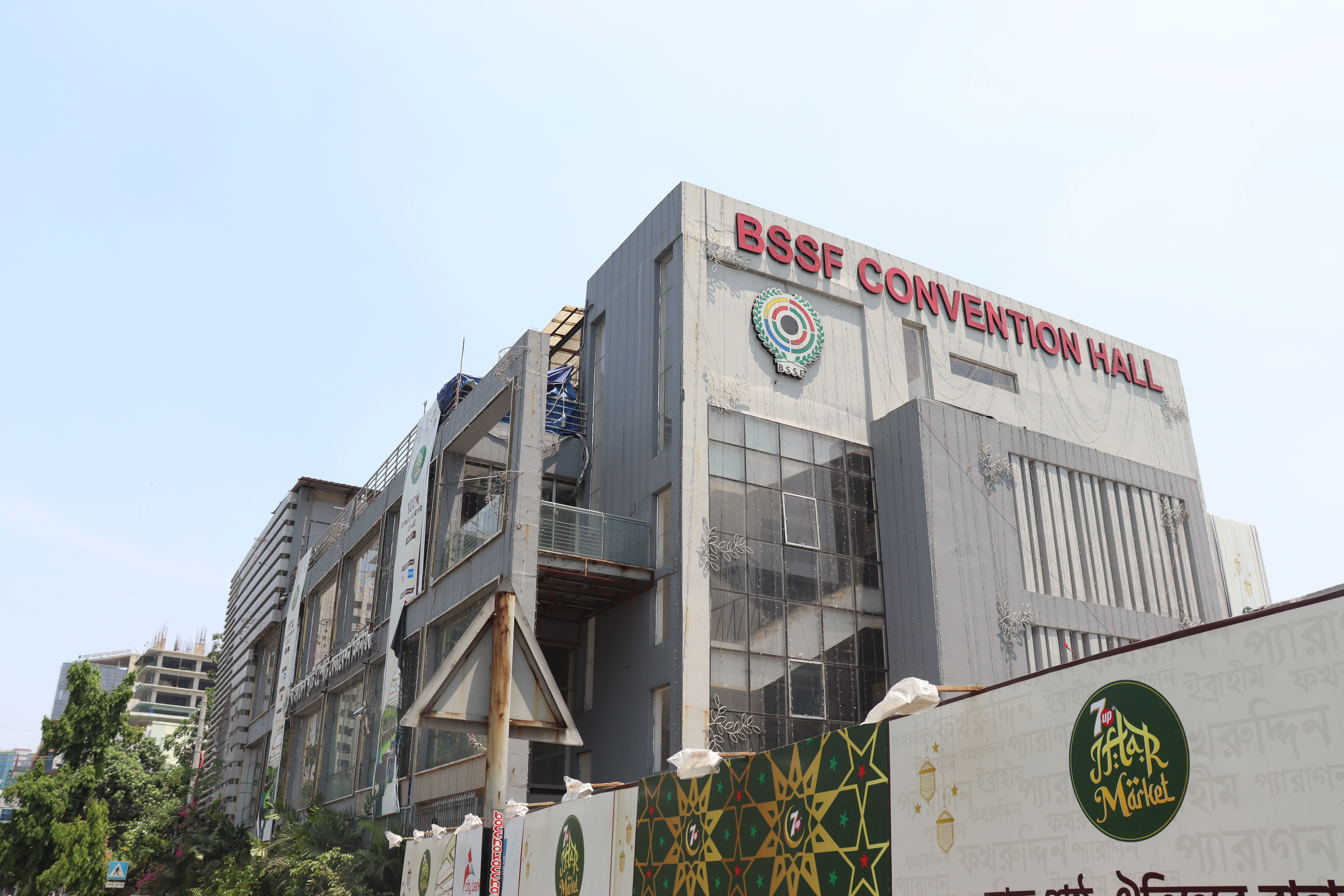
Gulshan Shooting Club

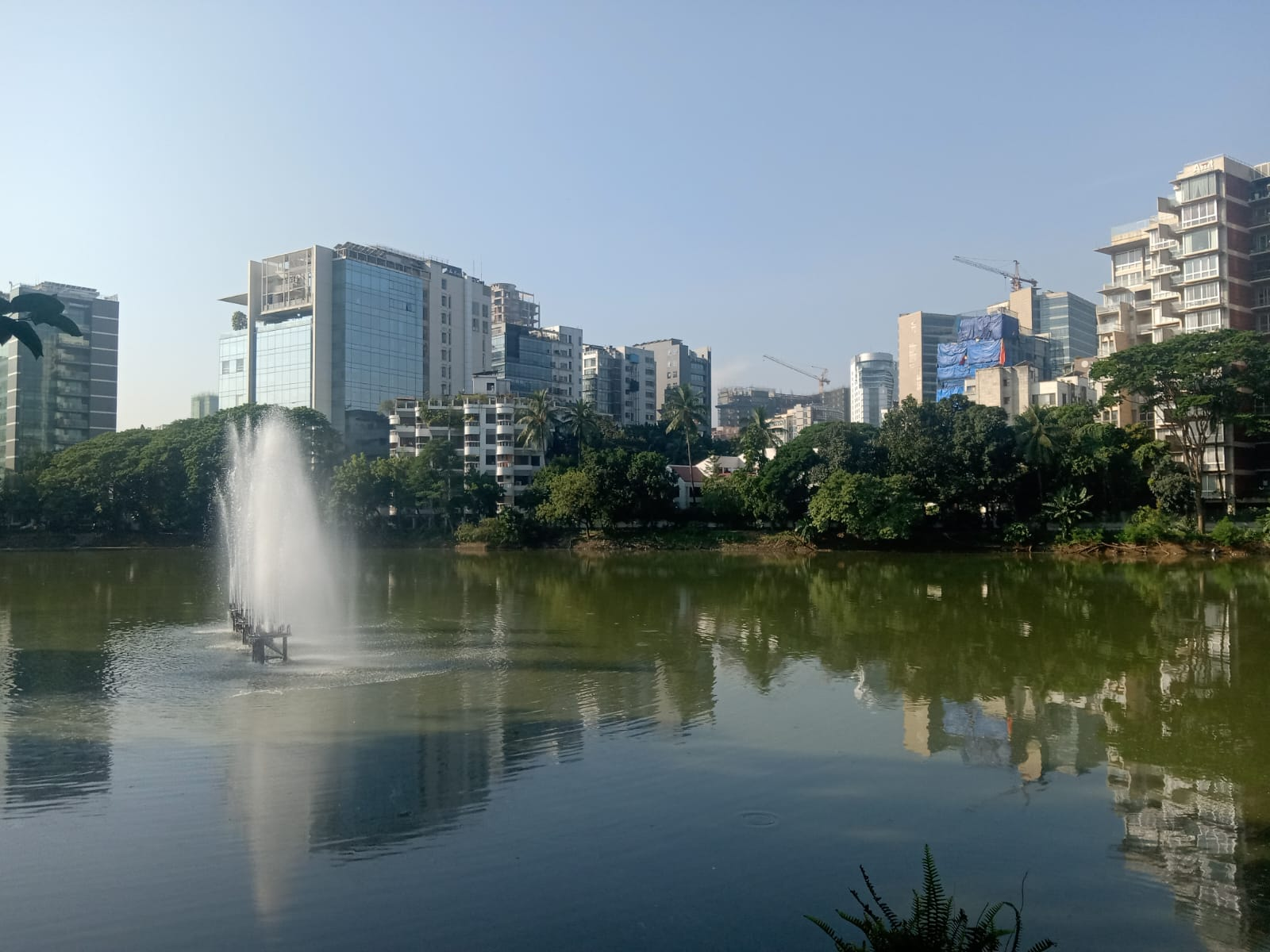
Gulshan Lake

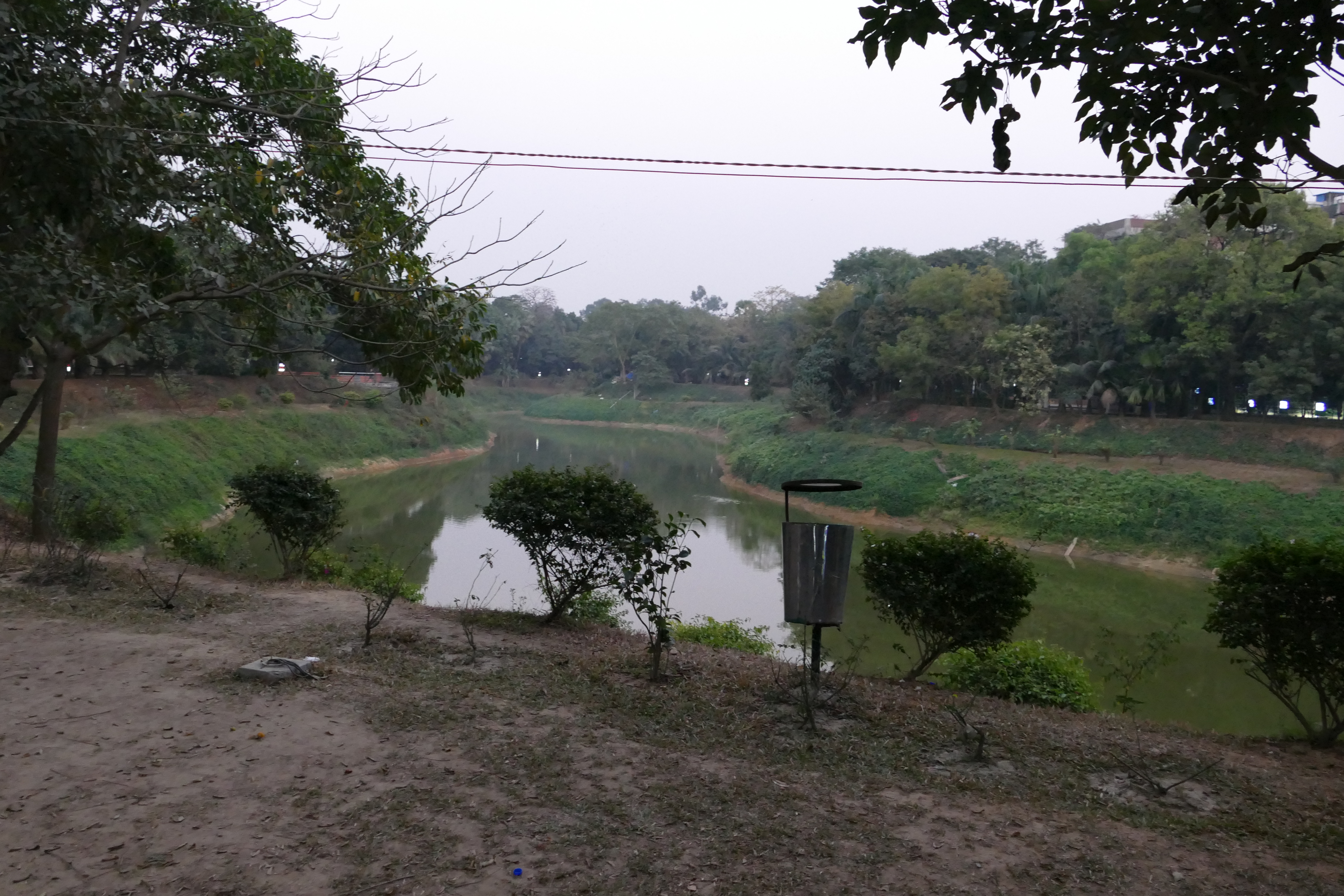
Gulshan Society Lake Park

== See also ==
- New Dhaka
