= Niketan =

Upscale Residential neighbourhood in Dhaka

Niketan নিকেতন
- Neighbourhood
- Niketan Residential Area, Gulshan; Niketan Housing Society
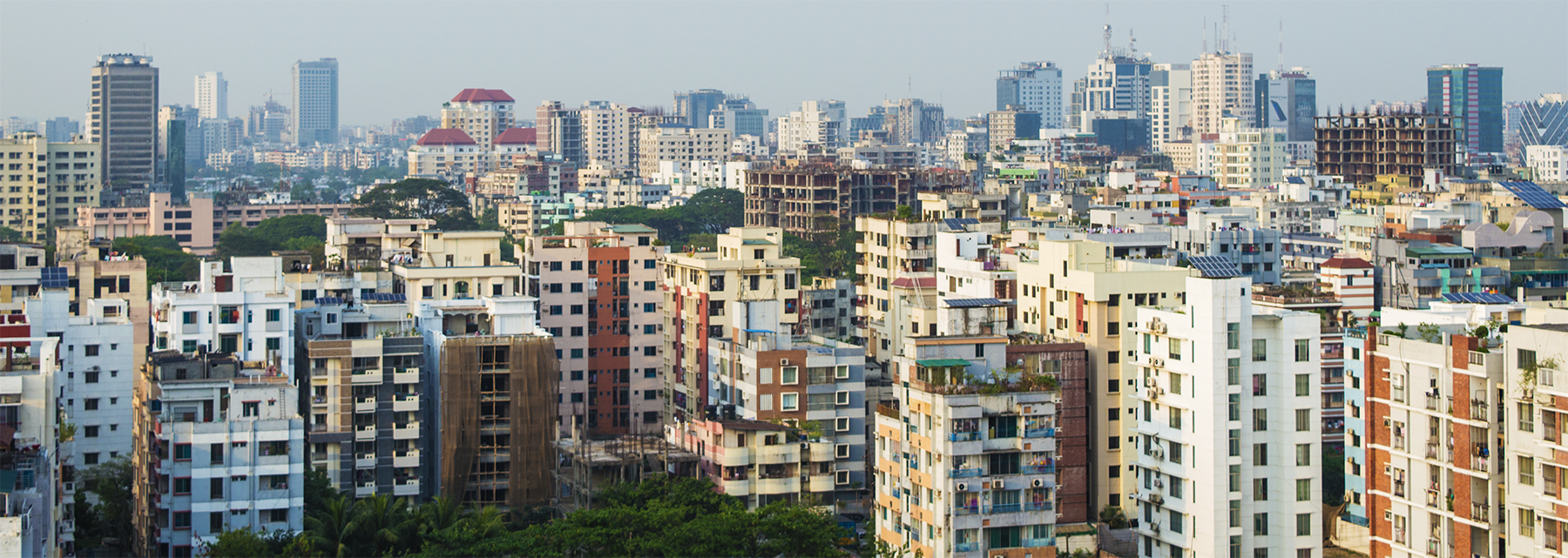
- Niketan skyline
- Expandable map of Niketan
- Coordinates: 23.774594°N 90.412003°E
- Country: Bangladesh
- Division: Dhaka
- Municipal corporation: Dhaka North City Corporation
- District: Dhaka District
- Police Station: Gulshan Police Station, H-32, 115 Gulshan Avenue, Gulshan-2
- Thana: Gulshan Thana
- Ward: Ward No. 20
- Founder: Eastern Housing Limited
- Parliament constituency: Dhaka-17
- Time zone: UTC+06:00 (BST)
- Postal code: 1212
- Area code: 1212
- Website: Niketan Society

Niketan or Niketon (Bengali: নিকেতন, romanised: Niketon) also known as Niketan Residential Area, Gulshan or Niketan Housing Society is an upscale residential neighbourhood in Dhaka, Bangladesh. Niketan is also a part of Gulshan Thana and Ward No. 20 of Dhaka North City Corporation.

== Geography ==
Niketan is located at 23.774594°N 90.412003°E. Niketan is surrounded by Gulshan-1, Mohakhali, Tejgaon and Hatirjheel areas. It has a lake called Gulshan Lake. Niketan area has a total of fourteen roads, and the road numbers are 1 through 14. The Niketan area is divided into blocks, and the blocks are A through H. There is a park called Shahid Dr. Fazle Rabbi Park right next to Niketan. Although it is a residential area, some offices have been built in this area.

== History ==
Niketan was a housing project of Eastern Housing Limited. The name of the area society is Niketan Welfare Society.

In November 2019, The Rajdhani Unnayan Kartripakkha (Rajuk) has fined Dhallywood star Shakib Khan Tk10 lakh for illegally constructing a section at his under-construction residential building in this area.

In March 2023, two people were burned in an AC blast in this area.

== Gallery ==
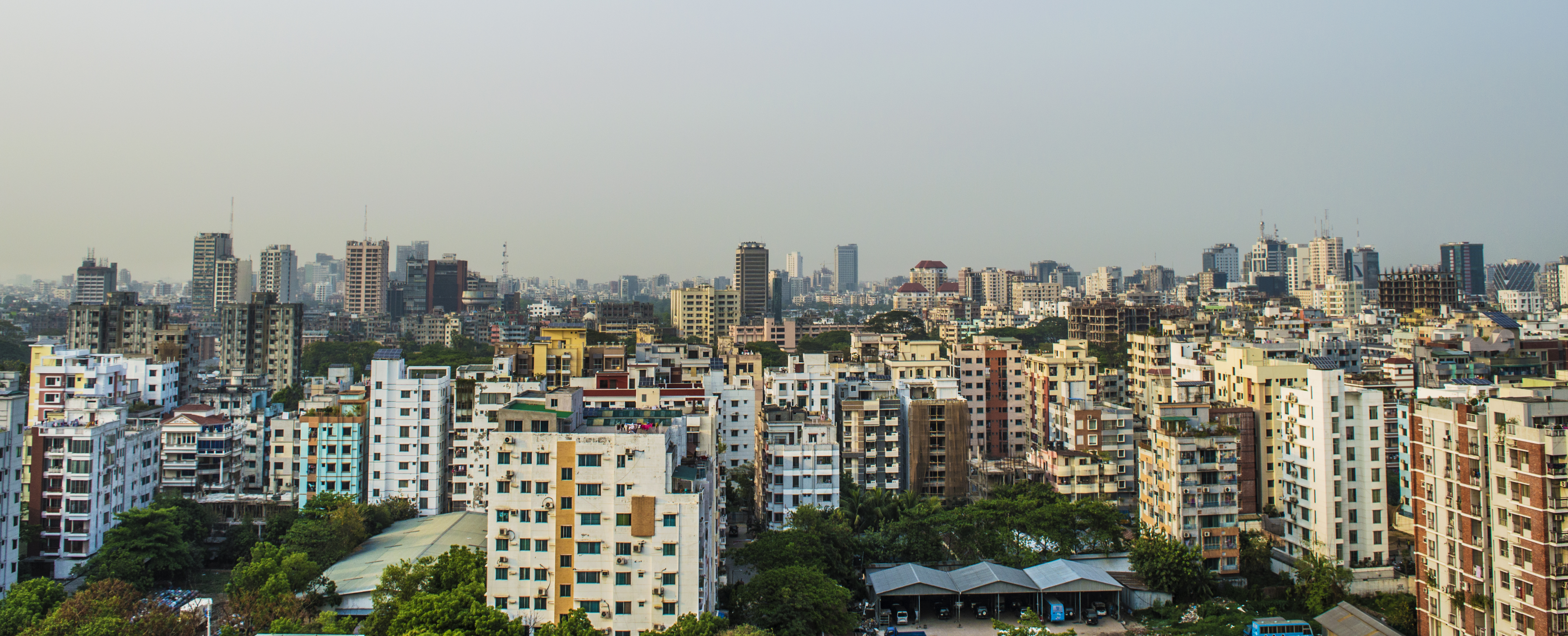
Skyline

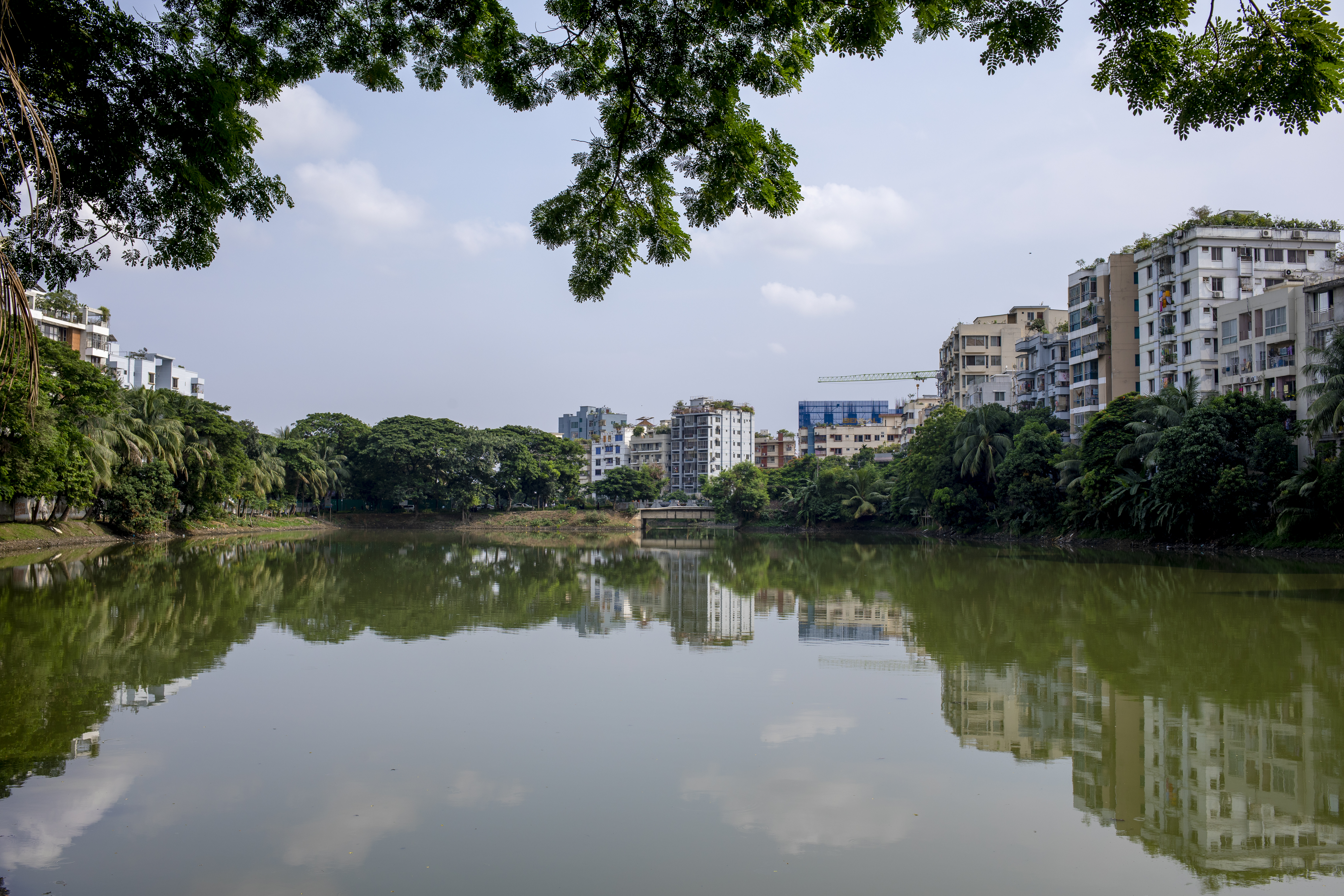
Gulshan Lake

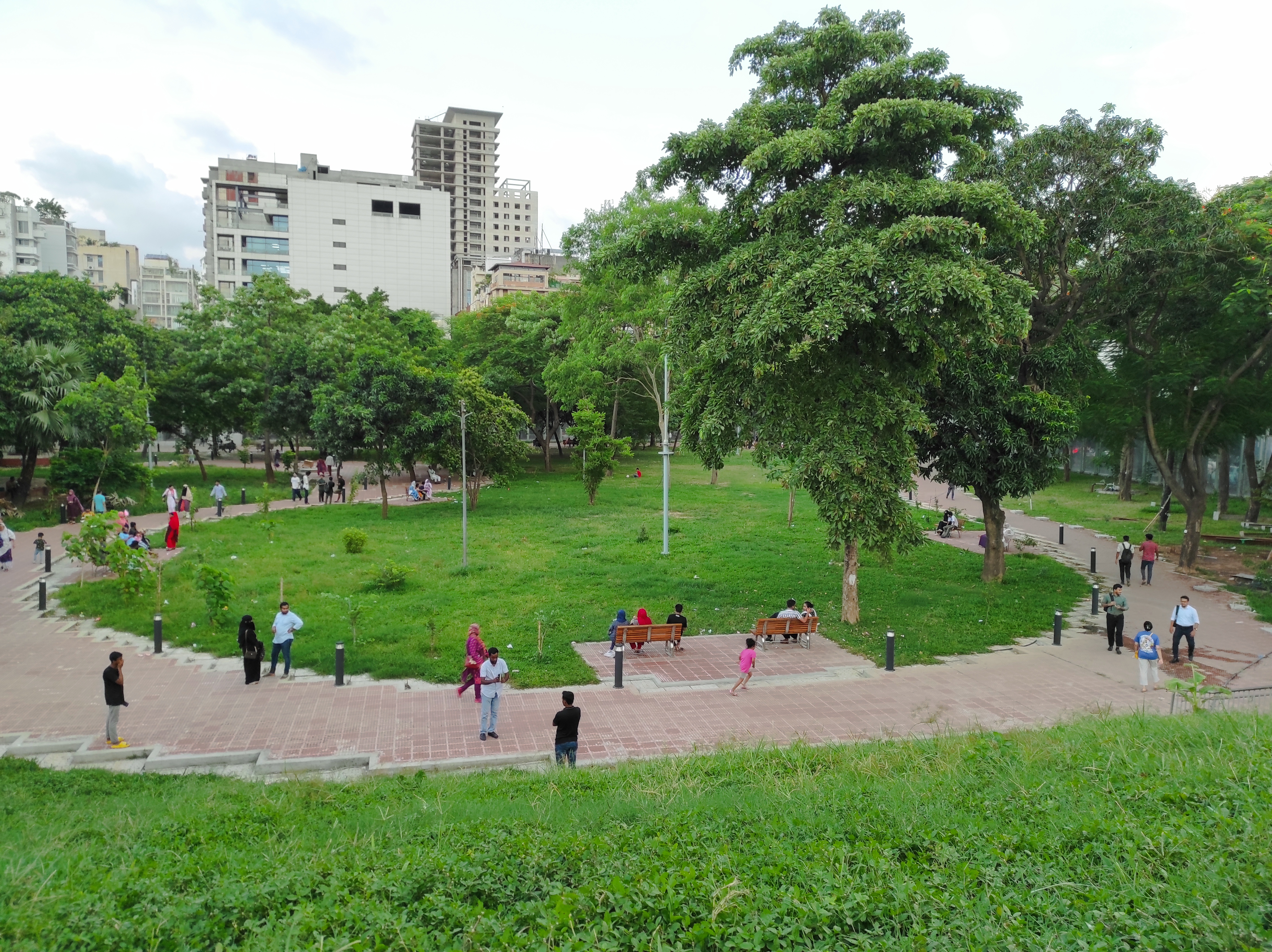
Shahid Dr. Fazle Rabbi Park

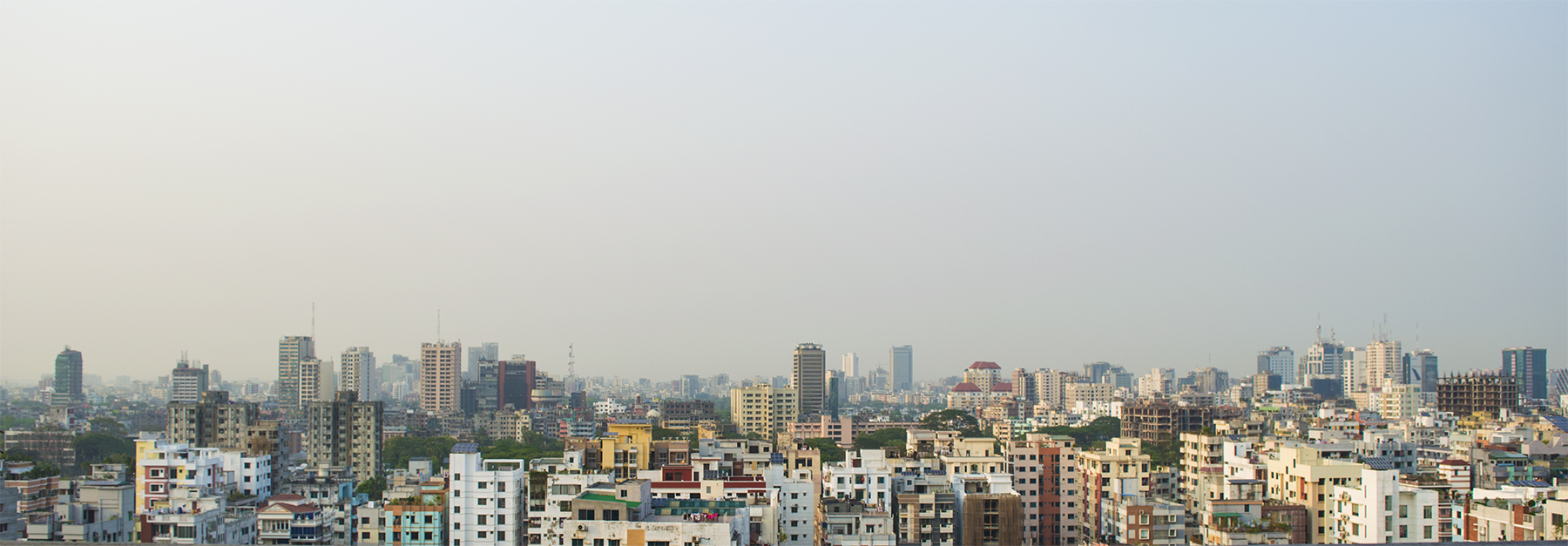
Partial view of Niketan, Gulshan and Mohakhali areas of Gulshan Thana
