= Justice Shahabuddin Ahmed Park =

Park in Dhaka, Bangladesh

- বিচারপতি শাহাবুদ্দিন আহমেদ পার্ক
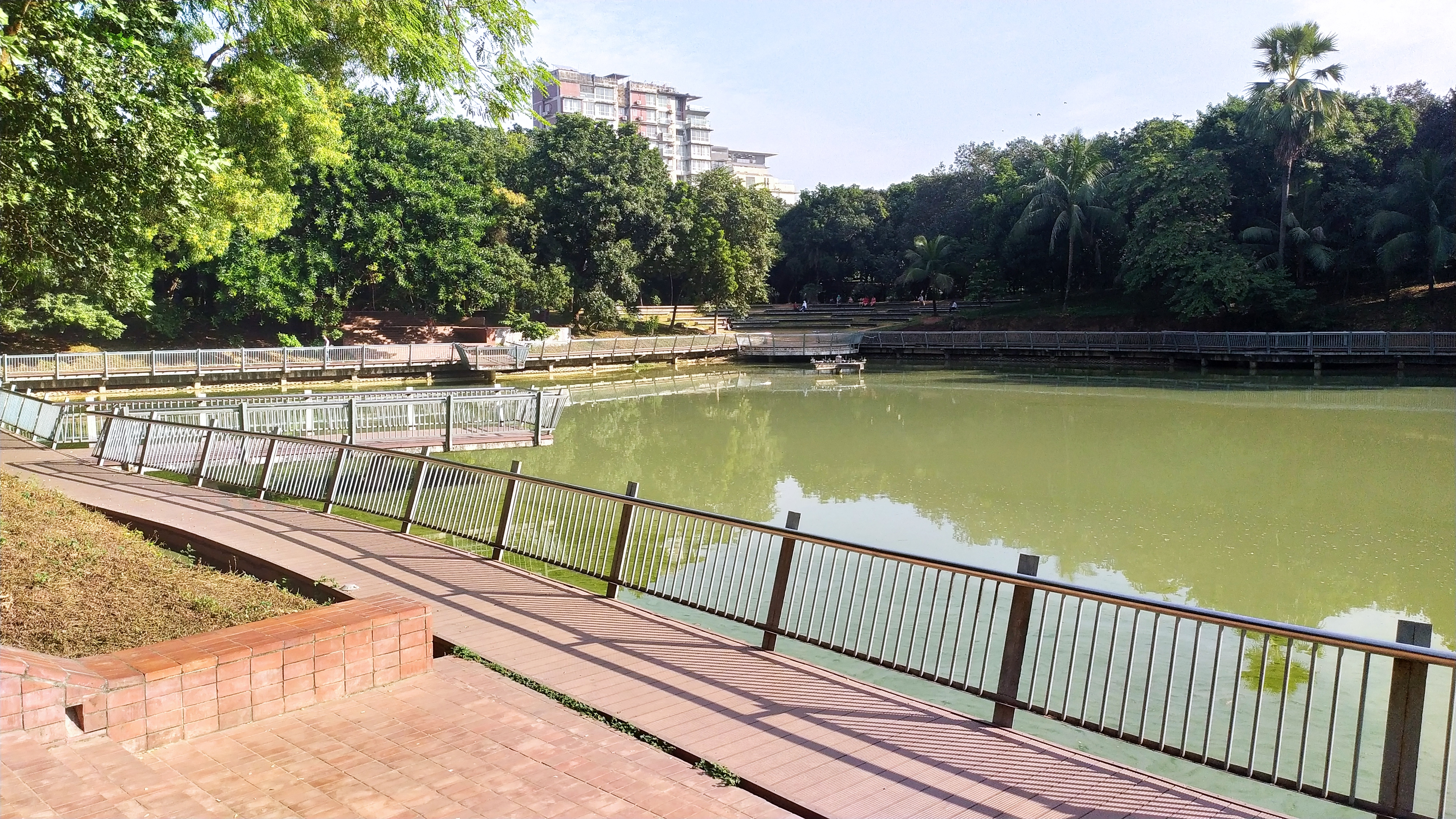
- Interactive map of Justice Shahabuddin Ahmed Park
- Type: Urban park
- Location: Gulshan 2, Dhaka
- Coordinates: 23°47′53″N 90°24′54″E
- Authorized: 12 September 2020
- Designer: PF Corporation
- Administrator: Dhaka North City Corporation
- Camp sites: 9.45 acre
- Plants: 1700

Justice Shahabuddin Ahmed Park (Bengali: বিচারপতি শাহাবুদ্দিন আহমেদ পার্ক) or in short Shahabuddin Park, is an urban park located in the Gulshan 2 area of Dhaka, Bangladesh. In 2008 the lake was named Shahabuddin Ahmed lake, around which the park was founded in 2020 on a 9.45 acres (3.82 ha) of land. The park was named Justice Shahabuddin Ahmed Park after the former Chief Justice and President of Bangladesh, Shahabuddin Ahmed. The park houses an outdoor gym, basketball court, bookstore, prayer room and a cafe with indoor and outdoor sitting arrangements. The park was a part of the Green Dhaka campaign, in which the main pond was cleaned and various trees were planted; this renovation cost €500,000–2,000,000.

== Gallery ==
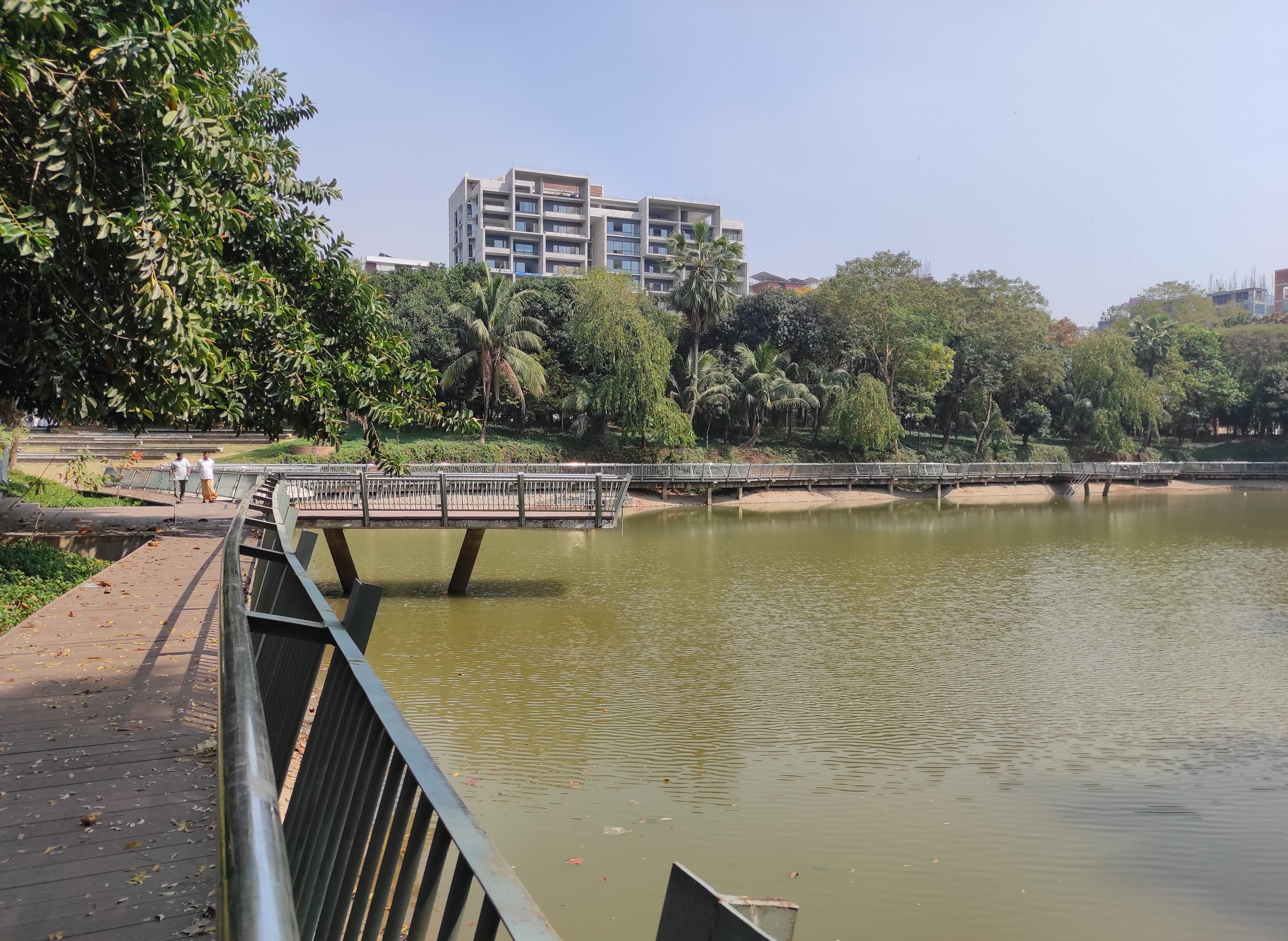

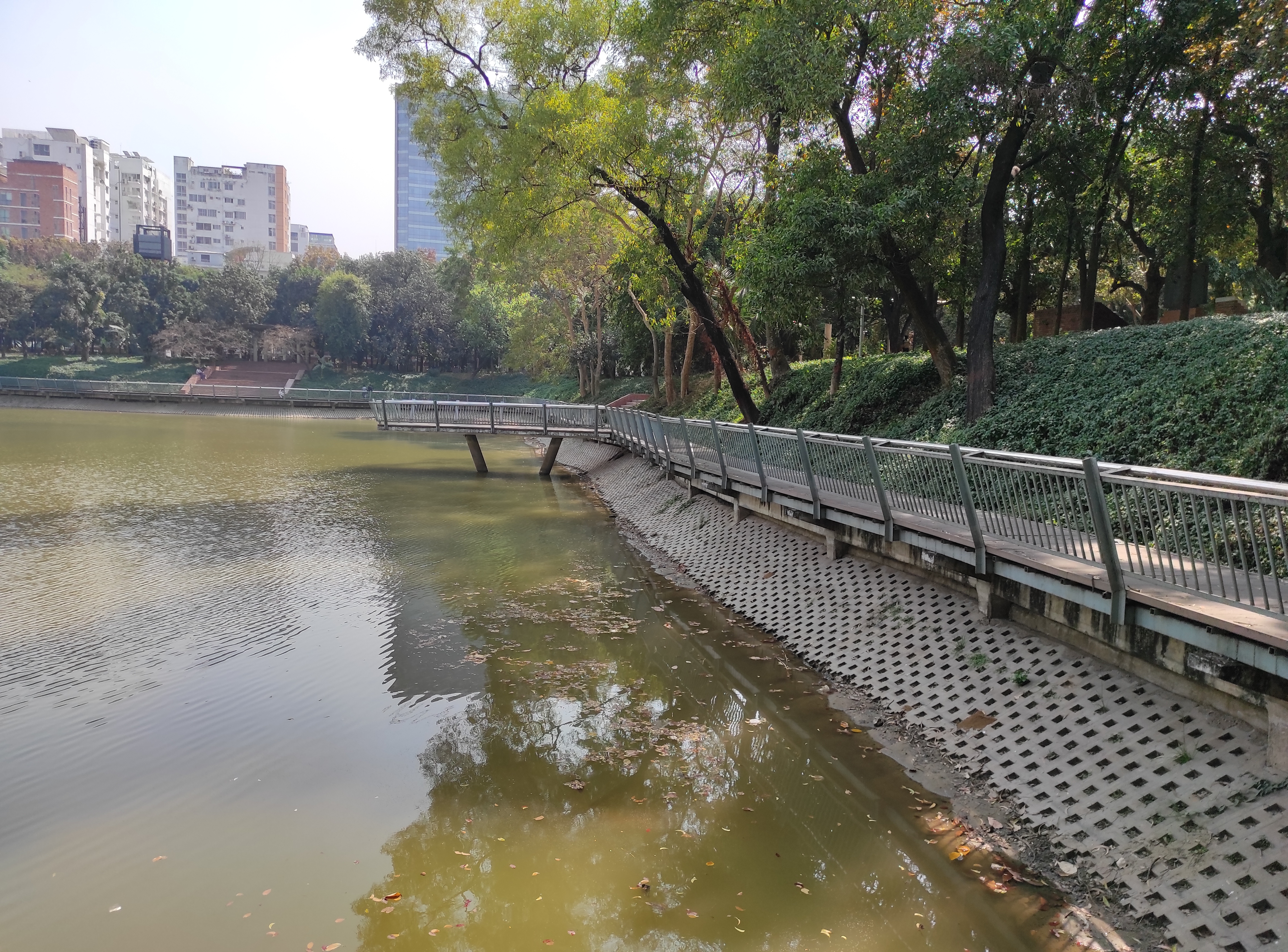

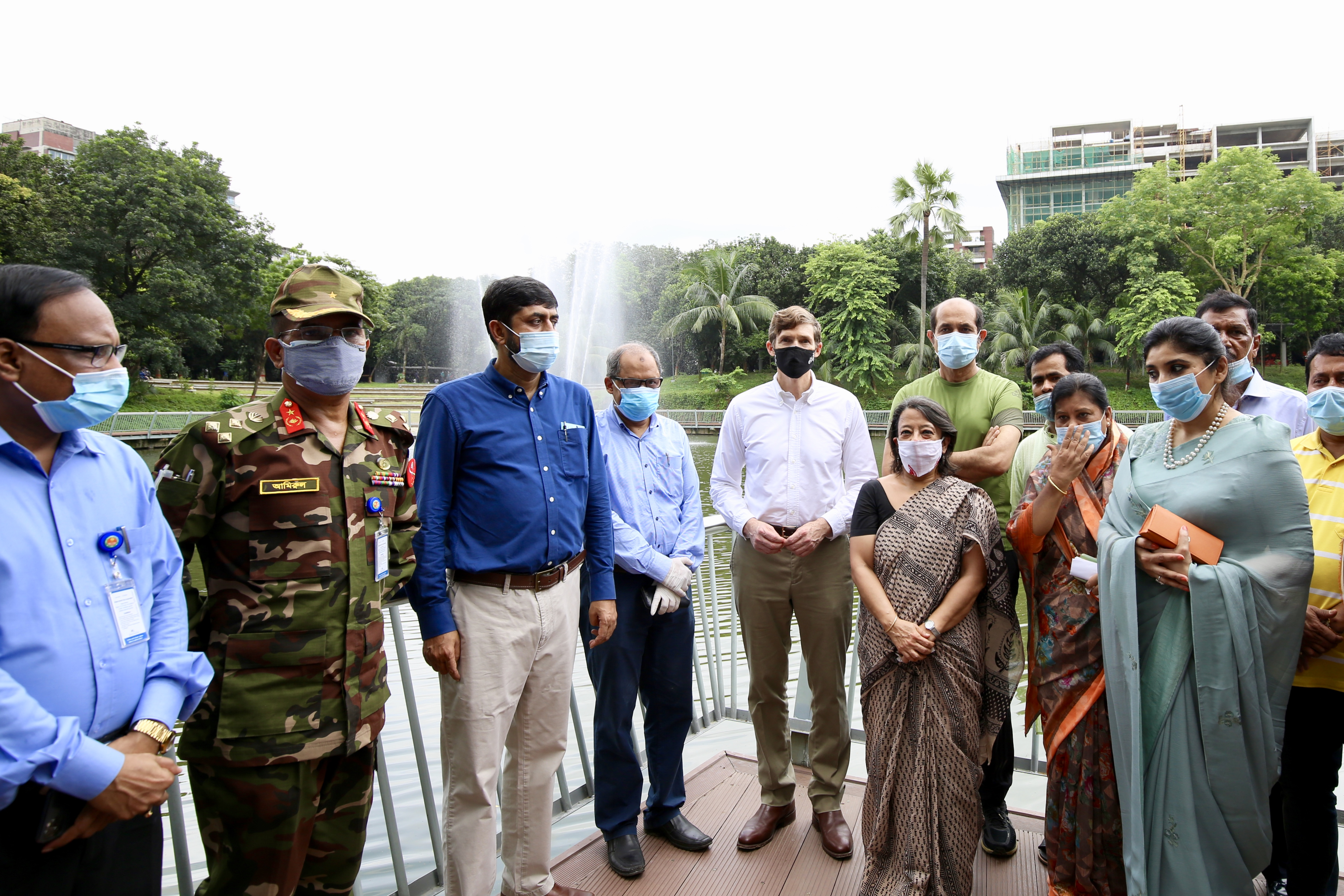
September 12, 2020 Ambassador Earl Miller and Atiqul Islam joined on Justice Shahbuddin Park inauguration ceremony and Tree plantation

== See also ==
- Shahid Dr. Fazle Rabbi Park
