= Lalmatia =

Coordinates: 24°26′N 88°27′E

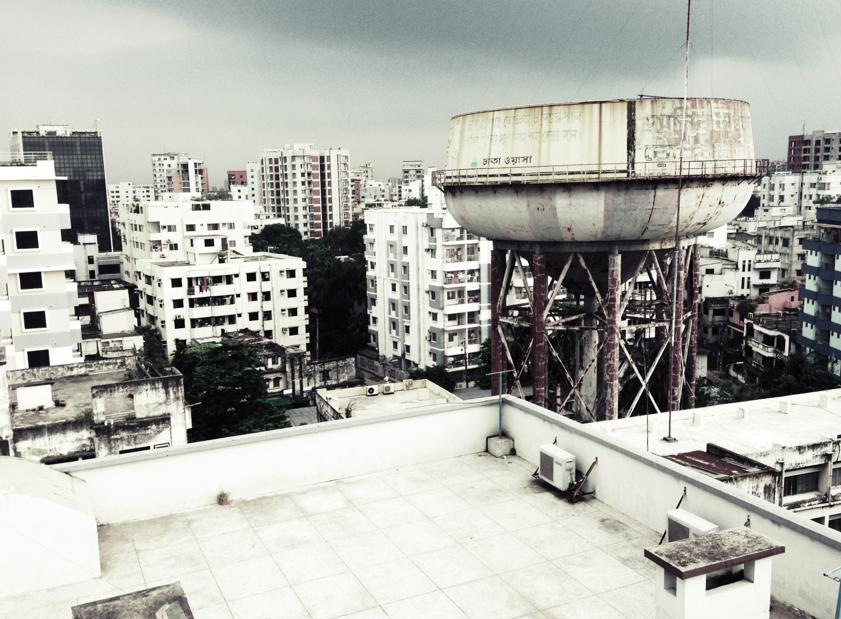
Dhaka WASA water tank in Block A

Lalmatia (Bengali: লালমাটিয়া) is a small residential neighbourhood located in Dhaka, Bangladesh. It is a part of Mohammadpur Thana at the south side of Mohammadpur, bordering Dhanmondi and Sher-e-Bangla Nagar.

== Population ==
The population of Lalmatia is 56,591 according to the 2023 census.

== Gallery ==
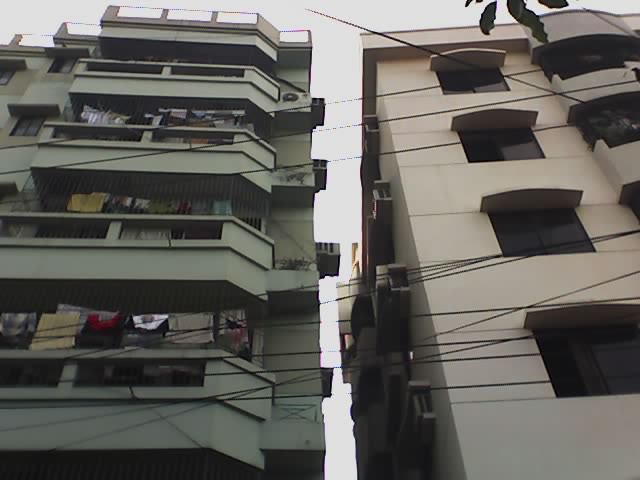
Buildings in Block D, Lalmatia

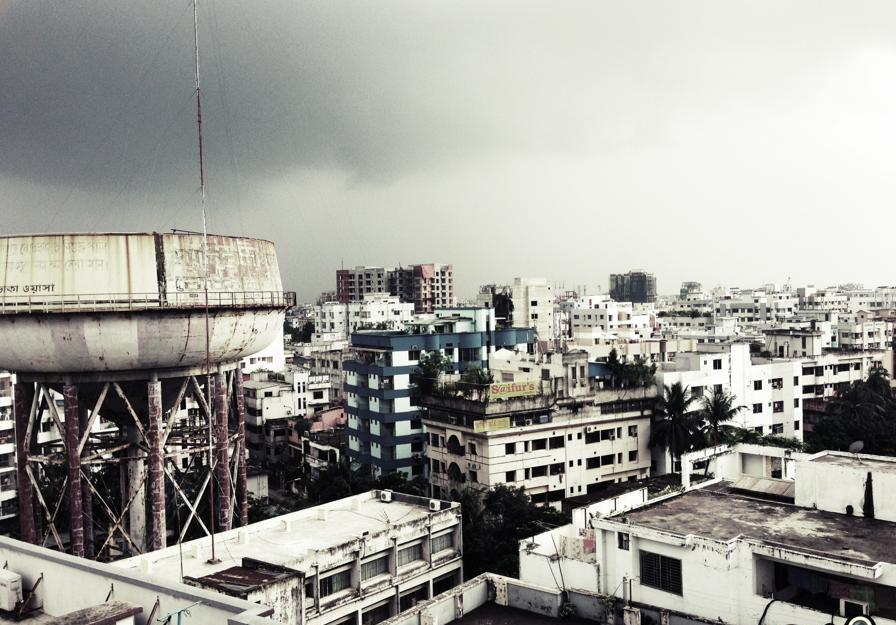
Block A, Lalmatia

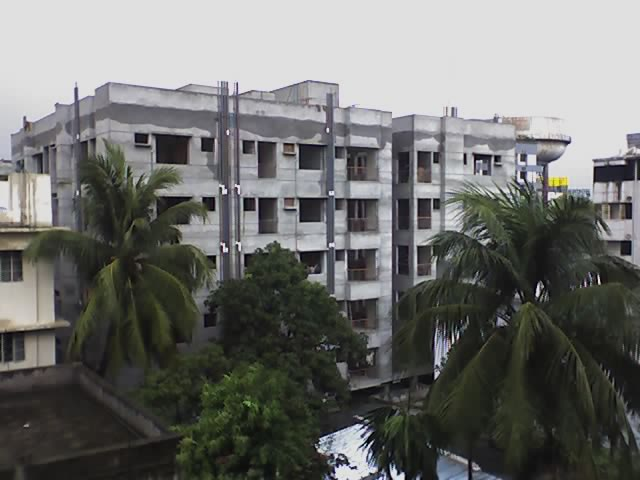
Monsoon in Lalmatia
