= Shahid Dr. Fazle Rabbi Park =

Park in Dhaka, Bangladesh

- শহীদ ডা. ফজলে রাব্বি পার্ক
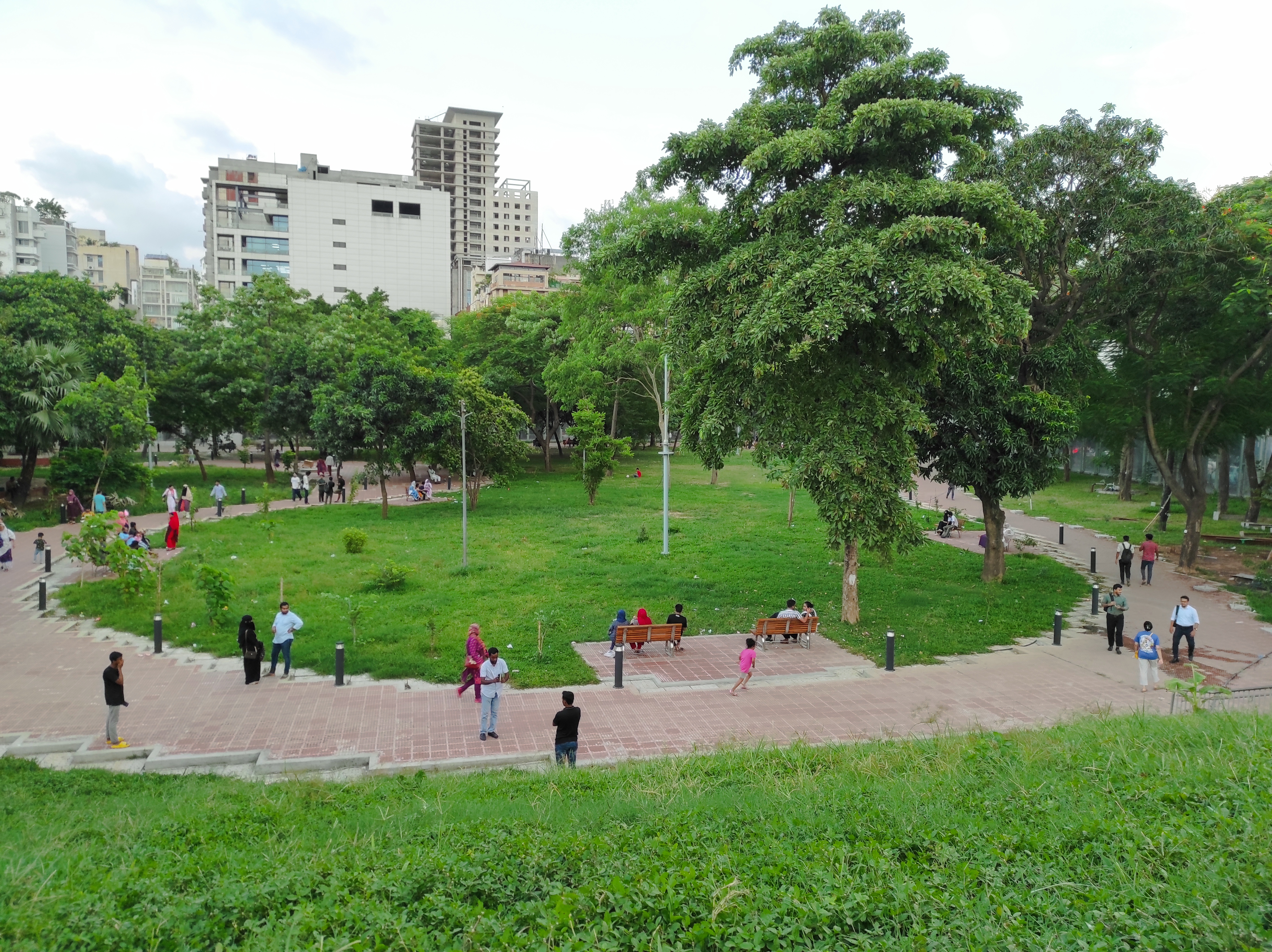
- Interactive map of Shahid Dr. Fazle Rabbi Park
- Type: Urban park
- Location: Gulshan-1, Niketan
- Coordinates: 23°46′25″N 90°24′55″E
- Area: 6.33 acre
- Operator: Dhaka North City Corporation
- Open: 1 February 2024 (reopend)
- Plants: 400

Shahid Dr. Fazle Rabbi Park (Bengali: শহীদ ডা. ফজলে রাব্বি পার্ক) or in short Fazle Rabbi Park, is an urban park located in the Gulshan-1, Niketan area of Dhaka, Bangladesh. Formerly it was called Gulshan South Park. The park was named Shahid Dr. Fazle Rabbi Park after the renowned cardiologist and martyred intellectual in the liberation war of Bangladesh, Mohammed Fazle Rabbee.

== See also ==
- Justice Shahabuddin Ahmed Park
