= Ershad ministry =

Government of Bangladesh from 1982 to 1990

- 3rd Council of Advisers and 9th & 10th Council of Ministers of the People's Republic of Bangladesh
- 27 March 1982 – 6 December 1990
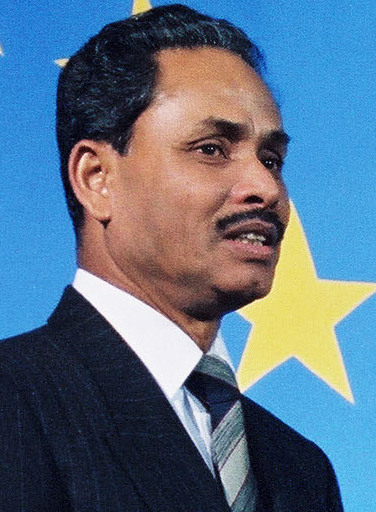
- Hussain Muhammad Ershad; Hon'ble President of Bangladesh
- Date formed: 27 March 1982; 44 years ago
- Date dissolved: 6 December 1990; 35 years ago

People and organisations
- President: Ahsanuddin Chowdhury; Hussain Muhammad Ershad
- Prime Minister: Hussain Muhammad Ershad; Ataur Rahman Khan; Mizanur Rahman Chowdhury; Moudud Ahmed; Kazi Zafar Ahmed
- Member party: Jatiya Party (Ershad)
- Status in legislature: Majority
- Opposition party: Awami League; Jamaat-e-Islami; Jatiya Samajtantrik Dal
- Opposition leader: Sheikh Hasina; Ghulam Azam; A. S. M. Abdur Rab

History
- Elections: 1986 Bangladeshi general election; 1988 Bangladeshi general election
- Predecessor: Sattar
- Successor: Shahabuddin

The Ershad ministry was the ministry behind the Government of Bangladesh during the 3rd and 4th legislative sessions of Jatiya Sangsad (Parliament). It began after Hussain Muhammad Ershad seized power through a bloodless military coup on 24th March 1982, ousting Abdus Sattar from power and ended following a mass uprising which ousted military ruler, Hussain Muhammad Ershad, from power in December 1990.

== Members ==
Portfolio	Minister	Took office	Left office
President and also in-charge of꞉: Presidential Secretariat (Presidential Division, General and Economic Affairs, Information Division); Cabinet Secretariat (Cabinet Division); Ministry of Defence; Ministry of Science and Technology	A. F. M. Ahsanuddin Chowdhury	27 March 1982	10 December 1983
President and also in-charge of꞉: Presidential Secretariat (Presidential Division, General and Economic Affairs, Information Division); Cabinet Secretariat (Cabinet Division); Ministry of Defence; Ministry of Science and Technology	Hussain Muhammad Ershad	11 December 1983	6 December 1990
Chief Martial Law Administrator	Hussain Muhammad Ershad	24 March 1982	11 November 1986
Vice-president and also in-charge of Ministry of Law and Parliamentary Affairs	A. K. M. Nurul Islam	1 December 1986	12 August 1989
Vice-president and also in-charge of Ministry of Law and Parliamentary Affairs	Moudud Ahmed	12 August 1989	6 December 1990
Prime Minister	Ataur Rahman Khan	30 March 1984	9 July 1986
Prime Minister	Mizanur Rahman Chowdhury	9 July 1986	27 March 1988
Prime Minister	Moudud Ahmed	27 March 1988	12 August 1989
Prime Minister	Kazi Zafar Ahmed	12 August 1989	6 December 1990
Deputy Prime Minister	Moudud Ahmed	9 July 1986	27 March 1988
Deputy Prime Minister	Kazi Zafar Ahmed	9 July 1986	10 August 1988
Deputy Prime Minister	Mohammed Abdul Matin	9 July 1986	13 August 1989
Deputy Prime Minister	Shah Moazzem Hossain	20 November 1987	6 December 1990

=== Cabinet ministers ===
Photo	Name	Ministry	Took office	Left office
	Abul Maal Abdul Muhith	Minister of Finance	11 December 1983	9 January 1984
	M Syeduzzaman	Minister of Finance	9 January 1984	26 December 1987
	A. K. Khandker	Minister of Finance	28 December 1987	22 March 1990
	Mohammad Abdul Munim	Minister of Finance	22 March 1990	6 December 1990
	Abdul Gafoor Mahmud	Minister of Food	11 December 1983	15 January 1985
	Mohabbat Jan Chowdhury	Minister of Food	16 January 1985	24 March 1986
	Abdul Mannan Siddique	Minister of Food	24 March 1986	25 May 1986
	Mohabbat Jan Chowdhury	Minister of Food	25 May 1986	30 November 1986
	Sardar Amjad Hossain	Minister of Food	30 November 1986	10 December 1988
	Iqbal Hossain Chowdhury	Minister of Food	20 December 1988	23 December 1989
	Shah Moazzem Hossain	Minister of Food	23 December 1989	6 December 1990
	Abdul Mannan Siddique	Minister of Home Affairs	11 December 1983	17 February 1986
	Mahmudul Hasan	Minister of Home Affairs	17 February 1986	1 December 1986
	Mohammed Abdul Matin	Minister of Home Affairs	1 December 1986	21 March 1989
	Mahmudul Hasan	Minister of Home Affairs	21 March 1989	6 December 1990
	A R Shamsud Doha	Minister of Foreign Affairs	11 December 1983	June 1984
	Humayun Rashid Choudhury	Minister of Foreign Affairs	June 1984	July 1985
	Anisul Islam Mahmud	Minister of Foreign Affairs	July 1985	6 December 1990
	Mahbub Ali Khan	Minister of Road Transport and Bridges	11 December 1983	1 June 1984
	Abu Zafar Obaidullah	Minister of Road Transport and Bridges	1 June 1984	25 October 1984
	Sultan Ahmed	Minister of Road Transport and Bridges	25 October 1984	5 August 1985
	Moudud Ahmed	Minister of Road Transport and Bridges	5 August 1985	24 March 1986
	Sultan Ahmed	Minister of Road Transport and Bridges	24 March 1986	25 May 1986
	Moudud Ahmed	Minister of Road Transport and Bridges	25 May 1986	9 August 1986
	Mohammed Abdul Matin	Minister of Road Transport and Bridges	9 August 1986	30 November 1986
	M. Matiur Rahman	Minister of Road Transport and Bridges	30 November 1986	27 March 1988
	Anwar Hossain Manju	Minister of Road Transport and Bridges	27 March 1988	6 December 1990
	AKM Maidul Islam	Minister of Civil Aviation and Tourism	11 December 1983	18 January 1985
	AR Yusuf	Minister of Civil Aviation and Tourism	19 January 1985	11 October 1985
	Shafiqul Ghani Swapan	Minister of Civil Aviation and Tourism	23 October 1986	29 November 1986
	Abdus Sattar	Minister of Civil Aviation and Tourism	27 March 1988	9 December 1988
	Zia Uddin Ahmed Bablu	Minister of Civil Aviation and Tourism	19 June 1989	18 July 1989
	H. M. A. Gaffar	Minister of Civil Aviation and Tourism	19 July 1989	9 October 1990
	Khandaker Abu Bakr	Minister of Law, Justice and Parliamentary Affairs	11 December 1983	1 June 1984
	Ataur Rahman Khan	Minister of Law, Justice and Parliamentary Affairs	1 June 1984	19 January 1985
	AR Yusuf	Minister of Law, Justice and Parliamentary Affairs	19 January 1985	17 February 1985
	A. K. M. Nurul Islam	Minister of Law, Justice and Parliamentary Affairs	17 February 1985	12 August 1989
	Moudud Ahmed	Minister of Law, Justice and Parliamentary Affairs	12 August 1989	2 May 1990
	Habibul Islam Bhuiyan	Minister of Law, Justice and Parliamentary Affairs	2 May 1990	6 December 1990
	A. Majeed Khan	Minister of Education	11 December 1983	1 June 1984
	Shamsul Huda Chowdhury	Minister of Education	1 June 1984	15 January 1985
	Shamsul Huda Chowdhury	Minister of Education	4 August 1985	16 February 1986
	Mohammed Abdul Matin	Minister of Education	16 February 1986	23 March 1986
	A. K. M. Nurul Islam	Minister of Education	24 March 1986	25 May 1986
	Momen Uddin Ahmed	Minister of Education	9 July 1986	30 November 1986
	Mahbubur Rahman	Minister of Education	30 November 1986	27 March 1988
	Anisul Islam Mahmud	Minister of Education	27 March 1988	10 December 1988
	Sheikh Shahidul Islam	Minister of Education	10 December 1988	2 May 1990
	Kazi Zafar Ahmed	Minister of Education	2 May 1990	6 December 1990
	Mirza Ruhul Amin	Minister of Social Welfare	23 December 1987	27 March 1988
	Rezwanul Haque	Minister of Social Welfare	14 November 1989	6 December 1990
	AKM Maidul Islam	Minister of Environment, Forest and Climate Change	19 July 1989	23 December 1989
	Zafar Imam	Minister of Environment, Forest and Climate Change	23 December 1989	6 December 1990
	Mahbubur Rahman	Minister of Religious Affairs	15 March 1984	1 June 1984
	Khandaker Abu Bakr	Minister of Religious Affairs	1 June 1984	15 January 1985
	K. M. Aminul Islam	Minister of Religious Affairs	9 November 1985	16 February 1986
	A. K. M. Nurul Islam	Minister of Religious Affairs	4 July 1985	25 May 1986
	Shamsul Huda Chaudhury	Minister of Religious Affairs	16 February 1986	23 March 1986
	Shamsul Huda Chaudhury	Minister of Religious Affairs	25 May 1986	9 July 1986
	Abdul Mannan	Minister of Religious Affairs	9 July 1986	14 June 1988
	M. Nazim Uddin Al Azad	Minister of Religious Affairs	24 December 1989	2 May 1990
	Kazi Shah Mofazzal Hossain Kaikobad	Minister of Religious Affairs	2 May 1990	6 December 1990
	Zafar Imam	Minister of Cultural Affairs	3 October 1989	23 December 1989
	Major General Shamsul Haque	Minister of Health and Family Welfare	11 December 1983	23 March 1986
	Mohammed Abdul Matin	Minister of Health and Family Welfare	29 May 1986	9 July 1986
	Salahuddin Quader Chowdhury	Minister of Health and Family Welfare	9 July 1986	23 January 1988
	Mohammed Abdul Matin	Minister of Health and Family Welfare	23 March 1988	6 August 1988
	Mohammad Abdul Munim	Minister of Health and Family Welfare	6 August 1988	20 March 1989
	Mohammed Abdul Matin	Minister of Health and Family Welfare	20 March 1989	13 August 1989
	Azizur Rahman	Minister of Health and Family Welfare	26 August 1989	6 December 1990
	Mohammad Abdul Munim	Minister of Housing and Public Works	11 December 1983	16 January 1985
	Mahmudul Hasan	Minister of Housing and Public Works	16 January 1985	4 July 1985
	Mohammed Abdul Matin	Minister of Housing and Public Works	4 July 1985	24 March 1986
	Mohammad Abdul Munim	Minister of Housing and Public Works	24 March 1986	25 May 1986
	Salahuddin Quader Chowdhury	Minister of Housing and Public Works	25 May 1986	9 July 1986
	K. M. Aminul Islam	Minister of Housing and Public Works	9 July 1986	30 November 1986
	Shafiqul Ghani Swapan	Minister of Housing and Public Works	30 November 1986	27 March 1988
	Sheikh Shahidul Islam	Minister of Housing and Public Works	27 March 1988	10 December 1988
	Mostafa Jamal Haider	Minister of Housing and Public Works	10 December 1988	3 December 1990
	Abul Hasnat	Minister of Housing and Public Works	20 October 1990	6 December 1990
	Mirza Nurul Huda	Minister of Commerce	11 December 1983	28 February 1984
	Mohammed Abdul Matin	Minister of Commerce	1 March 1984	15 January 1985
	Sultan Mahmud	Minister of Commerce	16 January 1985	2 July 1985
	Kazi Zafar Ahmed	Minister of Commerce	30 July 1985	23 March 1986
	Kazi Zafar Ahmed	Minister of Commerce	25 May 1986	31 December 1986
	Mohammad Abdul Munim	Minister of Commerce	1 January 1987	31 December 1987
	Major General Shamsul Haque	Minister of Commerce	3 May 1990	30 November 1990
	Zakir Khan Chowdhury	Minister of Youth and Sports	24 March 1985	9 July 1986
	Sunil Kumar Gupta	Minister of Youth and Sports	9 July 1986	10 December 1988
	A.B.M. Ruhul Amin Howlader	Minister of Youth and Sports	19 July 1989	23 December 1989
	Nitai Roy Chowdhury	Minister of Youth and Sports	9 September 1990	6 December 1990
	Abu Zafar Obaidullah	Minister of Agriculture	11 December 1983	31 May 1984
	Abdul Haleem Chowdhury	Minister of Agriculture	29 July 1984	15 January 1985
	Mohammad Abdul Munim	Minister of Agriculture	16 January 1985	30 November 1986
	Mirza Ruhul Amin	Minister of Agriculture	1 December 1986	9 August 1987
	Mohammad Mahbubuzzaman	Minister of Agriculture	10 August 1987	26 March 1988
	Mahmudul Hasan	Minister of Agriculture	28 March 1988	31 March 1989
	Mohammad Abdul Munim	Minister of Agriculture	1 April 1989	28 February 1990
	Sardar Amjad Hossain	Minister of Agriculture	1 May 1990	6 December 1990
	Sirajul Hossain Khan	Minister of Fisheries and Livestock	30 August 1985	31 July 1987
	Mirza Ruhul Amin	Minister of Fisheries and Livestock	1 August 1987	31 December 1987
	Sardar Amjad Hossain	Minister of Fisheries and Livestock	1 November 1988	30 September 1989
	Sunil Kumar Gupta	Minister of Fisheries and Livestock	1 October 1989	2 May 1990
	Mostafa Jamal Haider	Minister of Fisheries and Livestock	1 August 1990	6 December 1990
	Syed Najmuddin Hashim	Minister of Information and Broadcasting	11 December 1983	8 March 1984
	Major general Shamsul Haque	Minister of Information and Broadcasting	8 March 1984	15 January 1985
	AR Yusuf	Minister of Information and Broadcasting	19 January 1985	4 July 1985
	Sirajul Hossain Khan	Minister of Information and Broadcasting	4 July 1985	4 August 1985
	Shah Moazzem Hossain	Minister of Information and Broadcasting	4 August 1985	23 March 1986
	Anwar Zahid	Minister of Information and Broadcasting	9 July 1986	10 August 1987
	Anisul Islam Mahmud	Minister of Information and Broadcasting	24 January 1988	27 March 1988
	Mahbubur Rahman	Minister of Information and Broadcasting	27 March 1988	10 December 1988
	Kazi Zafar Ahmed	Minister of Information and Broadcasting	10 December 1988	2 May 1990
	Mizanur Rahman Shelley	Minister of Information and Broadcasting	2 May 1990	25 November 1990
	A. B. M. Ghulam Mostafa	Minister of Information and Broadcasting	25 November 1990	6 December 1990
	TIM Fazle Rabbi Chowdhury	Minister of Land	19 December 1984	4 July 1985
	Md Korban Ali	Minister of Land	4 July 1985	9 November 1985
	Zakir Khan Chowdhury	Minister of Land	24 March 1986	25 May 1986
	Mirza Ruhul Amin	Minister of Land	9 July 1986	30 November 1986
	AKM Maidul Islam	Minister of Land	30 November 1986	10 August 1987
	Sirajul Hossain Khan	Minister of Land	10 August 1987	27 March 1988
	Mostafa Jamal Haider	Minister of Land	27 March 1988	10 December 1988
	Sunil Kumar Gupta	Minister of Land	10 December 1988	3 October 1989
	Sardar Amjad Hossain	Minister of Land	3 October 1989	2 May 1990
	Tajul Islam Choudhury	Minister of Land	2 May 1990	6 December 1990
	Mahbub Ali Khan	Minister of Posts, Telecommunications and Information Technology	11 December 1983	1 June 1984
	Sultan Ahmed	Minister of Posts, Telecommunications and Information Technology	16 January 1985	25 May 1986
	Mizanur Rahman Chowdhury	Minister of Posts, Telecommunications and Information Technology	25 May 1986	27 March 1988
	Kazi Firoz Rashid	Minister of Posts, Telecommunications and Information Technology	9 August 1989	6 December 1990
	SM Shafiul Azam	Minister of Industries	11 December 1983	1 June 1984
	Sultan Mahmud	Minister of Industries	1 June 1984	9 July 1986
	Moudud Ahmed	Minister of Industries	9 July 1986	4 August 1990
	M. A. Sattar	Minister of Industries	4 August 1990	6 December 1990
	Sultan Mahmud	Minister of Power, Energy and Mineral Resources	11 December 1983	1 June 1984
	SM Shafiul Azam	Minister of Power, Energy and Mineral Resources	1 June 1984	15 January 1985
	Mohammad Abdul Munim	Minister of Power, Energy and Mineral Resources	24 March 1986	25 May 1986
	Anwar Hossain Manju	Minister of Power, Energy and Mineral Resources	25 March 1985	27 March 1988
	Ziauddin Ahmed Bablu	Minister of Power, Energy and Mineral Resources	19 July 1989	6 December 1990
	Abu Zafar Obaidullah	Minister of Water Resources	11 December 1983	1 June 1984
	M. H. Khan	Minister of Water Resources	1 June 1984	11 July 1984
	K. M. Aminul Islam	Minister of Water Resources	11 July 1984	16 January 1985
	Sultan Ahmed	Minister of Water Resources	16 January 1985	4 July 1985
	Anisul Islam Mahmud	Minister of Water Resources	19 July 1985	10 December 1988
	Mahbubur Rahman	Minister of Water Resources	10 December 1988	19 July 1989
	A. B. M. Ghulam Mostafa	Minister of Water Resources	19 July 1989	6 November 1990
	Mizanur Rahman Shelley	Minister of Water Resources	25 November 1990	6 December 1990
	BK Das	Minister of Disaster Management and Relief	24 March 1986	25 August 1986
	Sirajul Hossain Khan	Minister of Disaster Management and Relief	2 May 1988	23 March 1989
	Shamsur Rahman Chowdhury	Minister of Disaster Management and Relief	24 December 1989	29 July 1990
