= Minister of Planning (Bangladesh) =

Cabinet office in the Bangladeshi government

People's Republic of Bangladesh Adviser of Planning
- বাংলাদেশের পরিকল্পনা উপদেষ্টা
- Government Seal of Bangladesh

- Flag of Bangladesh

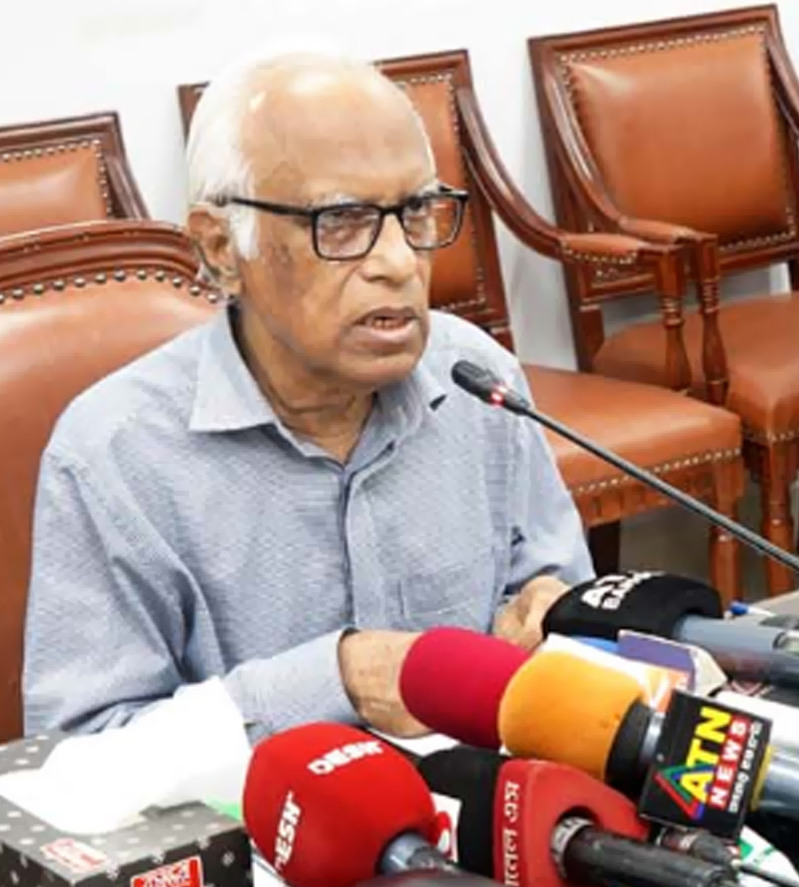
- Incumbent; Wahiduddin Mahmud since 16 August 2024
- Ministry of Planning
- Style: The Honourable (formal); His Excellency (diplomatic)
- Type: Cabinet minister
- Status: Adviser
- Member of: Cabinet; Advisory Council
- Reports to: Chief Adviser
- Seat: Bangladesh Secretariat
- Nominator: Chief Adviser of Bangladesh
- Appointer: President of Bangladesh; on the advice of the chief adviser
- Term length: Interim or the; chief adviser's pleasure
- Formation: 12 January 2002; 24 years ago
- Website: mop.gov.bd

The minister of planning of Bangladesh heads the Ministry of Planning within the government of Bangladesh. He is also the minister of all departments and agencies under that ministry.

== List of ministers ==
Parties

No party Bangladesh Nationalist Party Bangladesh Awami League Jatiya Party

No.	Portrait	Name	Took office	Left office	Head of government
		Tajuddin Ahmad	29 December 1971	16 March 1973	Sheikh Mujibur Rahman
		Sheikh Mujibur Rahman	16 March 1973	26 January 1975	Sheikh Mujibur Rahman
		Syed Nazrul Islam	26 January 1975	15 August 1975	Sheikh Mujibur Rahman
		Muhammad Yusuf Ali	20 August 1975	6 November 1975	Khondaker Mostaq Ahmad
		Abu Sadat Mohammad Sayem	10 November 1975	26 November 1975	Abu Sadat Mohammad Sayem
		Mirza Nurul Huda	26 January 1976	15 April 1979	Ziaur Rahman
		Fasihuddin Mahtab	15 April 1979	27 November 1981	Abdus Sattar
		Abdus Sattar	27 November 1981	24 March 1982	Abdus Sattar
		Abul Maal Abdul Muhith	31 March 1982	9 January 1984	A. F. M. Ahsanuddin Chowdhury; Hussain Muhammad Ershad
		A. Majeed Khan	1 June 1984	4 August 1985	Hussain Muhammad Ershad
		Shamsul Haque	25 May 1986	9 July 1986	Hussain Muhammad Ershad
		A. K. Khandker	14 September 1986	22 March 1990	Hussain Muhammad Ershad
		Mohammad Abdul Munim	22 March 1990	4 August 1990	Hussain Muhammad Ershad
		Moudud Ahmed	4 August 1990	6 December 1990	Hussain Muhammad Ershad
		Rehman Sobhan	17 December 1990	15 March 1991	Shahabuddin Ahmed
		A. M. Zahiruddin Khan	19 March 1991	12 September 1993	Khaleda Zia
		Abdul Moyeen Khan	13 March 1993	30 March 1996	Khaleda Zia
		Wahiduddin Mahmud	3 April 1996	23 June 1996	Muhammad Habibur Rahman
		Sheikh Hasina	23 June 1996	14 January 1997	Sheikh Hasina
		Muhiuddin Khan Alamgir	14 January 1997	15 July 2001	Sheikh Hasina
		M Hafizuddin Khan	16 July 2001	10 October 2001	Latifur Rahman
		M. Saifur Rahman	11 October 2001	29 October 2006	Khaleda Zia
		Shah M. Abul Hussain	1 October 2001	29 October 2006	Khaleda Zia
		Akbar Ali Khan	1 November 2006	12 December 2006	Iajuddin Ahmed
		Shoeb Ahmed	12 December 2006	11 January 2007	Iajuddin Ahmed
		A. B. Mirza Azizul Islam	14 January 2007	6 January 2009	Fakhruddin Ahmed
		A. K. Khandker	6 January 2009	12 January 2014	Sheikh Hasina
		Mustafa Kamal	12 January 2014	7 January 2019	Sheikh Hasina
		Muhammad Abdul Mannan	7 January 2019	11 January 2024	Sheikh Hasina
		Abdus Salam	11 January 2024	6 August 2024	Sheikh Hasina
		Salehuddin Ahmed	9 August 2024	16 August 2024	Muhammad Yunus
		Wahiduddin Mahmud	16 August 2024	Incumbent	Muhammad Yunus
