= Mostaq Ahmad ministry =

Government of Bangladesh (15 August 1975-6 November 1975)

- 5th Council of Ministers of the People's Republic of Bangladesh
- 20 August 1975 – 6 November 1975
- Date established: 15 August 1975
- Date dissolved: 7 November 1975

Leadership and composition
- President: Khondaker Mostaq Ahmad
- Vice-president: Mohammad Mohammadullah
- President's history: Chief Whip of United Front (1955-58); Foreign Minister of Bangladesh (Apr-Dec, 1971); Water Resources Minister of Bangladesh (1972-73); Commerce Minister of Bangladesh (1973-75)
- Total no. of members: 23
- Member party: Nonpartisan (de jure) (Note: Political organization was banned due to martial law, thus no political party effectively constituted or influenced the cabinet. Although, all of the cabinet members formerly belonged to BAKSAL and Awami League.)

Formation and history
- Election: -
- Legislature terms: 1st Jatiya Sangsad
- Predecessor: Mujib IV
- Successor: Sayem

The Mostaq Ahmad ministry was the military junta that ruled Bangladesh from 15 August 1975 to 7 November 1975. It was formed following the assassination of Sheikh Mujibur Rahman and the ousting of the BaKSAL government in 1975.

== Cabinet members ==
=== Ministers ===
Portfolio	Name	Term start	Term end
President	Khondaker Mostaq Ahmad	15 August 1975	6 November 1975
Vice President	Mohammad Mohammadullah	15 August 1975	6 November 1975
Minister of Foreign Affairs	Abu Sayeed Chowdhury	15 August 1975	6 November 1975
Minister of Planning	Muhammad Yusuf Ali	15 August 1975	6 November 1975
Minister of Local Government, Rural Development and Co-operatives	Phani Bhushan Majumder	15 August 1975	6 November 1975
Minister of Public Works and Urban Development	Muhammad Sohrab Hossain	15 August 1975	6 November 1975
Minister of Health and Family Planning	Abdul Mannan	15 August 1975	6 November 1975
Minister of Law, Justice and Parliamentary Affairs	Manoranjan Dhar	15 August 1975	6 November 1975
Minister of Agriculture, Minister of Food, Minister of Help and Rehabitilation	Abdul Momin	15 August 1975	6 November 1975
Minister of Port, Navigation, and Inland Water Transport	Asaduzzaman Khan	15 August 1975	6 November 1975
Minister of Finance	Azizur Rahman Mallick	15 August 1975	6 November 1975
Minister of Education, Science and Technological Research and Nuclear Energy	Muzaffar Ahmed Chowdhury	15 August 1975	6 November 1975

=== State ministers ===
Portfolio	Name	Term
Minister of Civil Aviation and Tourism	Shah Moazzem Hossain	20 August 1975 - 5 November 1975
Minister of Commerce, Petroleum and Mineral Resources	Dewan Farid Gazi	20 August 1975 - 6 November 1975
Minister of Labour, Social Welfare, Cultural Affairs and Sports	Taheruddin Thakur	20 August 1975 - 30 August 1975
Minister of Information and Broadcasting	Taheruddin Thakur	20 August 1975 - 5 November 1975
Minister of Cultural Affairs and Sports	Taheruddin Thakur	30 August 1975 - 5 November 1975
Minister of Industries	Nurul Islam Chowdhury	20 August 1975 - 6 November 1975
Minister of Communications (Railways Division)	Nurul Islam Manzur	30 August 1975 - 5 November 1975
Minister of Posts, Telecommunications and Information Technology	KM Obaidur Rahman	30 August 1975 - 5 November 1975
Minister of Flood Control, Water Resources and Power	Momen Uddin Ahmed	20 August 1975 - 6 November 1975
Minister of Jute	Moslem Uddin Khan	20 August 1975 - 6 November 1975
Ministry of Relief and Rehabilitation	Khitish Chandra Mondal	20 August 1975 - 6 November 1975
Minister of Labour and Social Welfare	Khitish Chandra Mondal	30 August 1975 - 6 November 1975
Minister of Forest, Fisheries and Livestock	Reazuddin Ahmed	20 August 1975 - 6 November 1975
Minister of Communications (Roads, Highways and Road Transport)	Syed Altaf Hossain	20 August 1975 - 6 November 1975
