= Simeen Mahmud =

Bangladeshi researcher

Simeen Mahmud was a demographics researcher and the lead researcher at the BRAC Institute of Governance and Development at BRAC University. She was a director of the Bangladesh Institute of Development Studies. She was the coordinator of the Centre for Gender and Social Transformation of BRAC University. She headed the Gender Studies Cluster at BRAC University.

Mahmud was the country coordinator for the Citizenship DRC. She worked on the empowerment of women. She was a researcher of gender studies.

== Early life ==
Mahmud's father was MN Huda, former vice president of Bangladesh and finance minister under President Ziaur Rahman, and her mother was Kulsum Huda. Her siblings were Mirza Najmul Huda and Zareen Huda Ahmed. She studied statistics at the University of Dhaka. She studied medical demography at the London School of Hygiene & Tropical Medicine. She was a MacArthur Fellow at the Harvard Center for Population and Development Studies.

== Career ==
In 1974, Mahmud became a staff demographer at the Bangladesh Institute of Development Studies.

Mahmud retired from the Bangladesh Institute of Development Studies in 2008. She was the director of the Population Studies Division of the Bangladesh Institute of Development Studies. She worked on the memoir of her father with her mother, Umme Kulsum Siddiqua Banu, who died in 2008. She was the vice-president of the Dhaka University Statistics Department Alumni Association.

Mahmud joined the BRAC Institute of Governance and Development (BIGD). She wrote The fabric of accountability in Bangladesh's garment industry for Open Democracy in 2009. She signed a letter with other women researchers protesting the removal of Muhammad Yunus from Grameen Bank. The other signatories were Amena Mohsin, Farida Akhter, Firdous Azim, Hameeda Hossain, Mahera Khatun, Maleka Begum, Mahmuda Islam, Najma Siddiqui, Nashid Kamal, Perween Hasan, Rasheda K Chowdhury, Rizwana Hasan, Rounaq Jahan, Salma Ali, Salma Khan, Shaheen Anam, Shireen Huq, Tasnim Azim, and Tahrunessa Abdullah. She signed another letter in 2012 condemning the restructuring of Grameen Bank.

From 2014 to 2015, Mahmud was a member of the Economic and Political Citizenship working group at the Cord Network. She collaborated on research with Naila Kabeer. She was the coordinator of the Centre for Gender and Social Transformation BRAC University. She taught at BRAC University.

=== Bibliography ===
- Women and Water-Pumps in Bangladesh: The Impact of Participation in Irrigation Groups on Women's Status.

== Personal life ==
Mahmud was married to Wahiduddin Mahmud, economics professor at the University of Dhaka. They had two sons and one daughter.

== Death ==
Mahmud died on 18 March 2018 at Mount Auburn Hospital in Cambridge, Massachusetts.
