= Iajuddin Ahmed ministry =

18th Council of Ministers of Bangladesh

- 18th Council of Ministers and 7th Council of Advisers of the People’s Republic of Bangladesh

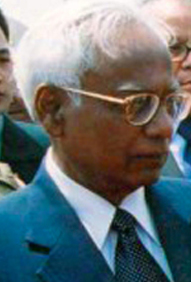
- Date formed: 29 October 2006
- Date dissolved: 11 January 2007

People and organisations
- President: Iajuddin Ahmed
- Chief Adviser: Iajuddin Ahmed
- Total no. of members: 11
- Status in legislature: Dissolved

History
- Election: -
- Outgoing election: -
- Predecessor: Khaleda III
- Successor: Fakhruddin

The Iajuddin Ahmed ministry led the Caretaker government of Bangladesh from 26 October 2006 to 11 January 2007 following the end of term of the Bangladesh Nationalist Party administration.

== Background ==
According to the constitution of Bangladesh, the immediate past Chief Justice is appointed as Chief Advisor during a caretaker government. After Justice KM Hasan declined the position, reportedly because of ill health, five other men were considered for the position. The last option was for the President to take over, as provided for in the constitution. Iajuddin Ahmed was sworn in as the Chief Advisor of the Caretaker Government on 29 October 2006 after the main political parties failed to agree on another candidate. Dr. Iajuddin Ahmed resigned from his position On 11 January 2007.

== List of Advisors ==
Portfolio	Minister	Took office	Left office
President; Chief Adviser and also in-charge of: Chief Adviser's Office; Armed Forces Division; Chief Adviser's Division; Bangladesh Election Commission; NGO Affairs Bureau; Ministry of Defence; Ministry of Establishment; Ministry of Foreign Affairs; Ministry of Home Affairs; Ministry of Education	Iajuddin Ahmed	29 October 2006	11 January 2007
Adviser of Law, Justice and Parliamentary Affairs; Adviser of Land; Adviser of Environment and Forests	Fazlul Haque	1 November 2006	11 January 2007
Adviser of Finance; Adviser of Planning; Adviser of Commerce; Adviser of Posts and Telecommunications	Akbar Ali Khan	1 November 2006	12 December 2006
Adviser of Finance; Adviser of Planning; Adviser of Commerce; Adviser of Posts and Telecommunications	Shoeb Ahmed	12 December 2006	11 January 2007
Adviser of Power, Energy and Mineral Resources; Adviser of Food and Disaster Management; Adviser of Communications; Adviser of Chittagong Hill Tracts Affairs	Hasan Mashhud Chowdhury	1 November 2006	12 December 2006
Adviser of Power, Energy and Mineral Resources; Adviser of Food and Disaster Management; Adviser of Communications; Adviser of Chittagong Hill Tracts Affairs	Ruhul Alam Chowdhury	12 December 2006	11 January 2007
Adviser of Agriculture; Adviser of Cultural Affairs; Adviser of Youth and Sports	C. M. Shafi Sami	1 November 2006	12 December 2006
Adviser of Agriculture; Adviser of Cultural Affairs; Adviser of Youth and Sports	Md Shafiqual Haque Choudhury	12 December 2006	11 January 2007
Adviser of Fisheries and Livestock; Adviser of Housing and Public Works; Adviser of Liberation War Affairs	Dhiraj Kumar Nath	1 November 2006	11 January 2007
Adviser of Water Resources; Adviser of Information; Adviser of Religious Affairs	Mahbubul Alam	1 November 2006	11 January 2007
Adviser of Local Government, Rural Development and Co-operatives; Adviser of Shipping; Adviser of Civil Aviation and Tourism	M. Azizul Haq	1 November 2006	11 January 2007
Adviser of Health and Family Welfare; Adviser of Labour and Employment; Adviser of Expatriates' Welfare and Overseas Employment	Sufia Rahman	1 November 2006	11 January 2007
Adviser of Women and Children Affairs; Adviser of Primary and Mass Education; Adviser of Social Welfare	Yasmeen Murshed	1 November 2006	11 January 2007
Adviser of Industries; Adviser of Science, Information and Communication Technology; Adviser of Textiles and Jute	Sultana Kamal	1 November 2006	12 December 2006
Adviser of Industries; Adviser of Science, Information and Communication Technology; Adviser of Textiles and Jute	Md. Muinuddin Khan	12 December 2006	11 January 2007
