= Syed Aminul Islam =

Syed Aminul Islam is the first registrar general of the Bangladesh Supreme Court and member of the Justice Division Reform Commission of the Muhammad Yunus-led interim government. He is a former director of the National Legal Aid Services Organisation. He is a former district judge and chairman of the Minimum Wage Board.

== Career ==
Islam served as a district and sessions judge.

In 2014, Islam was a director of the National Legal Aid Services Organisation. According to him from 2001 to 2008 only 3 percent of the allocated legal aid fund was utilized by the public.

Islam was serving as a registrar of the Supreme Court in 2014. He signed the gazette notification for dismissing Additional Attorney General M Khalilur Rahman who was also a prosecutor for the International Crimes Tribunal. He started the process for the digitalization of services in the higher courts.

Islam was appointed the first registrar general of the Bangladesh Supreme Court in June 2015. The post of registrar general was created following the Ministry of Law, Justice and Parliamentary Affairs approving a proposal by Chief Justice Surendra Kumar Sinha. He oversaw the death reference of Muhammad Kamaruzzaman, war crimes convict, after his appeal was denied by the Supreme Court. In 2016, he collected recording of a talk show on Somoy TV so that the Appellate Division could examine it to see if there were any comments in the show made in contempt of the court.

In October 2017, Islam reported that the judges of the Appellate Division refused to sit with Chief Justice Surendra Kumar Sinha following 11 allegations of corruption by President Mohammad Abdul Hamid. He was appointed chairman of the Minimum Wage Board as part of major changes in the personnel of the Bangladesh Supreme Court. Sinha expressed concern over the independence of the judiciary after being forced to flee to Australia by the Directorate General of Forces Intelligence. Islam signed a statement that Sinha said he would resign but instead took leave and left the country for Australia.

Following the fall of the Sheikh Hasina led Awami League government, Islam was included in the Justice Division Reform Commission created by the Muhammad Yunus led interim government. In July 2025, his allotment of a flat in the Dhanmondi Housing Project was cancelled by the government of Bangladesh.
