= Minister of Finance (Bangladesh) =

Finance Minister of The People's Republic of Bangladesh

- অর্থমন্ত্রী
- Government Seal of Bangladesh

- Flag of Bangladesh

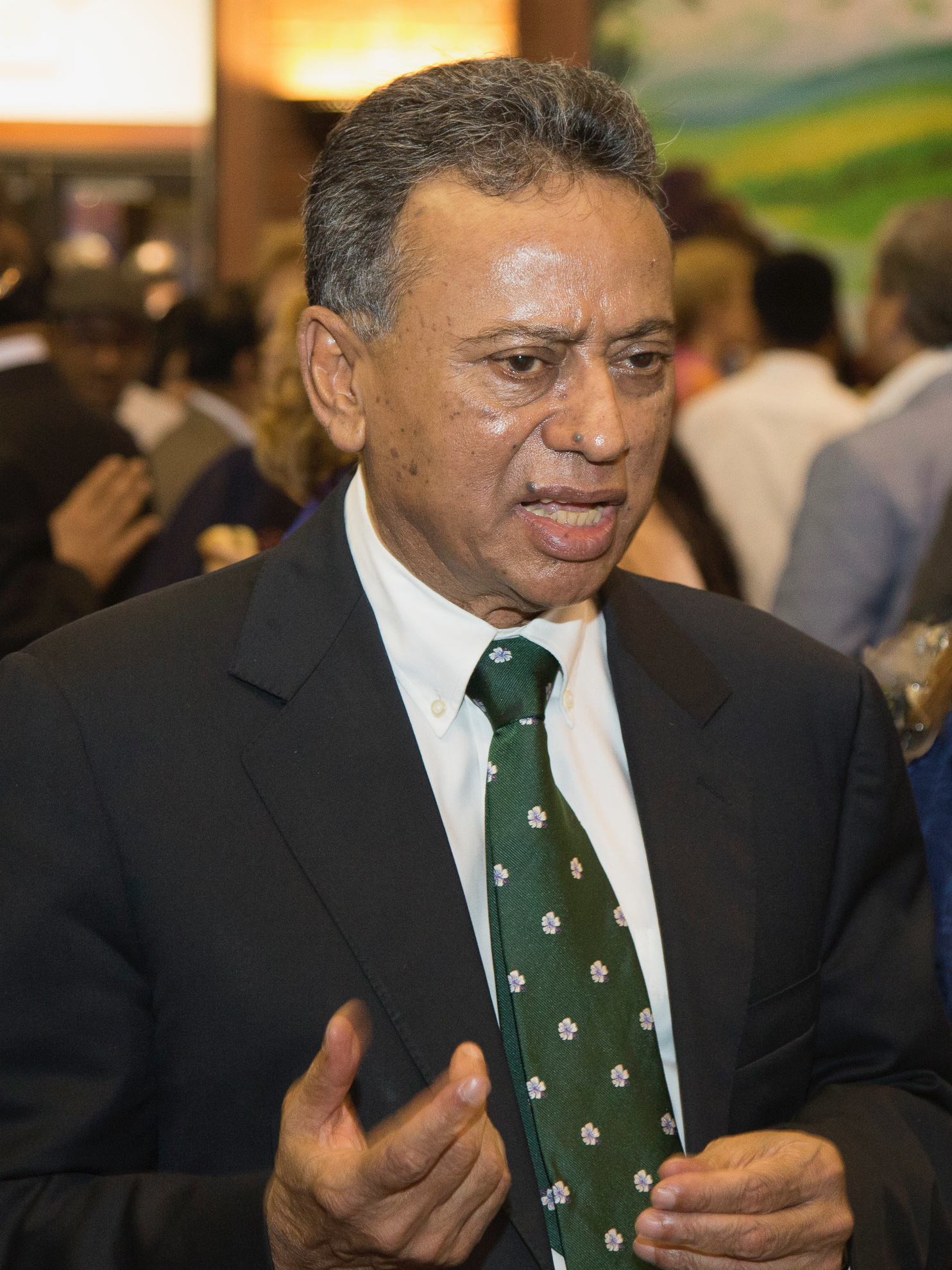
- Incumbent; Amir Khasru Mahmud Chowdhury since 17 February 2026
- Ministry of Finance
- Style: The Honourable (formal); His Excellency (diplomatic)
- Type: Cabinet minister
- Status: Minister
- Member of: Cabinet; National Committee on Security Affairs
- Reports to: Prime Minister
- Seat: Bangladesh Secretariat
- Nominator: Prime Minister
- Appointer: President; on the advice of the Prime Minister
- Term length: at the Prime Minister's pleasure
- Inaugural holder: Mansur Ali
- Formation: 14 April 1971; 55 years ago
- Deputy: Zonayed Saki
- Salary: ৳245000 (US$2,000) per month (incl. allowances)
- Website: mof.gov.bd

The Minister of Finance is the head of the Ministry of Finance of the government of Bangladesh. It is one of the most important positions in the Cabinet and the finance minister must deal with all the other departments and plays an important role in deciding the funding levels for each.

The finance minister is responsible each year for presenting the government's budget.

== Ministers ==
Caretaker minister

Portrait	Minister (Birth-Death) Constituency	Term of office			Political party	Ministry	Prime Minister
Portrait	Minister (Birth-Death) Constituency	From	To	Period	Political party	Ministry	Prime Minister
	Muhammad Mansur Ali মুহাম্মদ মনসুর আলী (1917–1975)	10 April 1971	12 January 1972	277 days	Awami League	Mujib I	Tajuddin Ahmad
	Tajuddin Ahmad তাজউদ্দীন আহমদ (1925–1975)	13 January 1972	16 March 1973	1 year, 62 days	Awami League	Mujib II	Sheikh Mujibur Rahman
	Sheikh Mujibur Rahman শেখ মুজিবুর রহমান (1920–1975) (Prime Minister)	16 March 1973	26 January 1975	1 year, 316 days	Awami League	Mujib III	Sheikh Mujibur Rahman
	Azizur Rahman Mallick আজিজুর রহমান মল্লিক (1918–1997)	26 January 1975	15 August 1975	1 year, 62 days	BAKSAL	Mujib IV	Muhammad Mansur Ali
	Muhammad Yusuf Ali মুহাম্মদ ইউসুফ আলী (1923–1998)	20 August 1975	9 November 1975	81 days	Independent	Mostaq	Vacant
	Lieutenant General; Ziaur Rahman লেফটেন্যান্ট জেনারেল জিয়াউর রহমান (1936–1981)	10 November 1975	26 September 1976	321 days	Military	Sayem	Vacant
	Lieutenant General; Ziaur Rahman লেফটেন্যান্ট জেনারেল জিয়াউর রহমান (1936–1981)	29 June 1978	14 April 1979	289 days	Bangladesh Nationalist Party	Zia	Mashiur Rahman
	Mirza Nurul Huda মির্জা নূরুল হুদা (1919–1991)	15 April 1979	24 April 1980	1 year, 9 days	Bangladesh Nationalist Party	Zia	Shah Azizur Rahman
	M. Saifur Rahman এম. সাইফুর রহমান (1932–2009); MP for Sylhet–14	25 April 1980	23 November 1981	1 year, 261 days	Bangladesh Nationalist Party	Zia	Shah Azizur Rahman
	M. Saifur Rahman এম. সাইফুর রহমান (1932–2009); MP for Sylhet–14	24 November 1981	11 January 1982	1 year, 261 days	Bangladesh Nationalist Party	Sattar	Shah Azizur Rahman
	Fasihuddin Mahtab ফসিউদ্দিন মাহতাব (?–2008)	12 January 1982	26 March 1982	73 days	Bangladesh Nationalist Party	Sattar	Shah Azizur Rahman
	Abul Maal Abdul Muhith আবুল মাল আব্দুল মুহিত (1934–2022)	31 March 1982	9 January 1984	1 year, 284 days	Independent	Ershad	Vacant
	M Syeduzzaman এম সাইদুজ্জামান (born 1933)	9 January 1984	29 November 1986	3 years, 351 days	Jatiya Party (Ershad)	Ershad	Ataur Rahman Khan
	M Syeduzzaman এম সাইদুজ্জামান (born 1933)	30 November 1986	26 December 1987	3 years, 351 days	Jatiya Party (Ershad)	Ershad	Mizanur Rahman Chowdhury
	Air Vice Marshal (Retd); A. K. Khandker এয়ার ভাইস মার্শাল আব্দুল করিম খন্দকার (born 1930)	28 December 1987	22 March 1990	2 years, 84 days	Jatiya Party (Ershad)	Ershad	Moudud Ahmed
	Mohammad Abdul Munim মোহাম্মদ আব্দুল মুনিম	22 March 1990	6 December 1990	259 days	Jatiya Party (Ershad)	Ershad	Moudud Ahmed
	Kafiluddin Mahmood কফিলউদ্দিন মাহমুদ (?–2011) (Adviser)	9 December 1990	27 December 1990	18 days	Independent	Shahabuddin	Shahabuddin Ahmed
	Rehman Sobhan রেহমান সোবহান (born 1935) (Adviser)	27 December 1990	27 December 1990	0 days	Independent	Shahabuddin	Shahabuddin Ahmed
	M. Saifur Rahman মোহাম্মদ সাইফুর রহমান (1932–2009)	20 March 1991	19 March 1996	5 years, 10 days	Bangladesh Nationalist Party	Khaleda I	Khaleda Zia
	M. Saifur Rahman মোহাম্মদ সাইফুর রহমান (1932–2009)	19 March 1996	30 March 1996	5 years, 10 days	Bangladesh Nationalist Party	Khaleda II	Khaleda Zia
	Wahiduddin Mahmud ওয়াহিদউদ্দিন মাহমুদ (born–1948) (Adviser)	31 March 1996	23 June 1996	84 days	Independent	Habibur	Muhammad Habibur Rahman
	Shah A M S Kibria শাহ এ এম এস কিবরিয়া (1931–2005)	23 June 1996	15 July 2001	5 years, 22 days	Awami League	Hasina I	Sheikh Hasina
	M Hafizuddin Khan এম হাফিজ উদ্দিন খান (1936–2026) (Adviser)	16 July 2001	10 October 2001	86 days	Independent	Latifur	Latifur Rahman
	M. Saifur Rahman সাইফুর রহমান (1932–2009); MP for Sylhet-1	10 October 2001	28 October 2006	5 years, 18 days	Bangladesh Nationalist Party	Khaleda III	Khaleda Zia
	Akbar Ali Khan আকবর আলি খান (1944–2022) (Adviser)	31 October 2006	12 December 2006	42 days	Independent	Iajuddin	Iajuddin Ahmed
	Shoeb Ahmed শোয়েব আহমেদ (born 1948) (Adviser)	13 December 2006	11 January 2007	29 days	Independent	Iajuddin	Iajuddin Ahmed
	A. B. Mirza Azizul Islam এ. বি. মির্জা আজিজুল ইসলাম (born ?) (Adviser)	14 January 2007	6 January 2009	1 year, 358 days	Independent	Fakhruddin	Fakhruddin Ahmed
	Abul Maal Abdul Muhith আবুল মাল আব্দুল মুহিত (1934–2022); MP for Sylhet-1	6 January 2009	11 January 2014	10 years, 1 day	Awami League	Hasina II	Sheikh Hasina
	Abul Maal Abdul Muhith আবুল মাল আব্দুল মুহিত (1934–2022); MP for Sylhet-1	12 January 2014	7 January 2019	10 years, 1 day	Awami League	Hasina III	Sheikh Hasina
	Mustafa Kamal মুস্তফা কামাল (born 1947); MP for Comilla-10	7 January 2019	10 January 2024	5 years, 3 days	Awami League	Hasina IV	Sheikh Hasina
	Abul Hassan Mahmood Ali আবুল হাসান মাহমুদ আলী (1943–2025); MP for Dinajpur-4	11 January 2024	5 August 2024	207 days	Awami League	Hasina V	Sheikh Hasina
	Salehuddin Ahmed সালেহউদ্দিন আহমেদ (born–1949)	8 August 2024	17 February 2026	1 year, 193 days	Independent	Yunus	Muhammad Yunus
	Amir Khasru Mahmud Chowdhury আমীর খসরু মাহমুদ চৌধুরী (born 1949); MP for Chittagong-11	17 February 2026	Incumbent	242 days	Bangladesh Nationalist Party	Tarique	Tarique Rahman
