= Wahiduddin Mahmud =

Bangladeshi economist

- ওয়াহিদউদ্দিন মাহমুদ
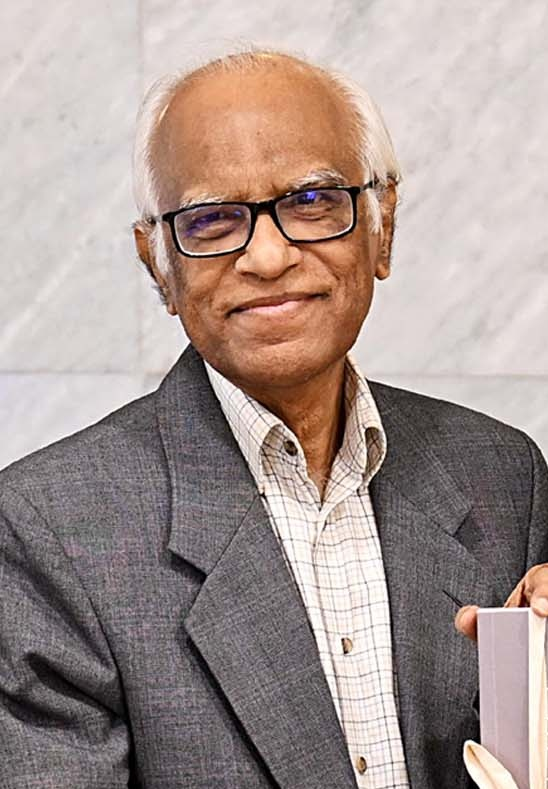
- Mahmud in 2025

Adviser for Planning
- In office 16 August 2024 – 17 February 2026
- Chief Adviser: Muhammad Yunus
- Preceded by: Salehuddin Ahmed
- Succeeded by: Amir Khasru Mahmud Chowdhury
- In office 31 March 1996 – 23 June 1996
- Chief Adviser: Muhammad Habibur Rahman
- Preceded by: Abdul Moyeen Khan
- Succeeded by: Sheikh Hasina

Adviser for Education
- In office 16 August 2024 – 5 March 2025
- Chief Adviser: Muhammad Yunus
- Preceded by: Mohibul Hasan Chowdhury
- Succeeded by: Chowdhury Rafiqul Abrar

Adviser for Finance
- In office 31 March 1996 – 23 June 1996
- Chief Adviser: Muhammad Habibur Rahman
- Preceded by: Saifur Rahman
- Succeeded by: Shah Abu Muhammad Shamsul Kibria

Personal details
- Born: 1 July 1948 (age 78) Noakhali, East Bengal Pakistan
- Spouse: Simeen Mahmud
- Education: University of Dhaka; Cambridge University; London School of Economics
- Occupation: Economist

Dr. Wahiduddin Mahmud (born 1 July 1948) is an economist from Bangladesh. He was the Adviser of Planning and Education of the Government of Bangladesh. He is a member of the United Nations Committee for Development Policy. Mahmud was a professor of economics at the University of Dhaka. He was in charge of the Ministry of Finance and Planning in the caretaker government of Bangladesh in 1996.

== Early life ==
Mahmud completed his matriculation from Annada Government High School, Brahmanbaria. Then he moved to Dhaka to study economics at University of Dhaka. He earned his PhD in economics from Cambridge University. He later joined University of Dhaka as a professor of economics.

== Career ==
Mahmud is a member of International Growth Centre based at London School of Economics. He has held positions at Cambridge University, Oxford University, IDS at Sussex, IFPRI, and the World Bank. He was part of many government committees and commissions in Bangladesh relating to micro-finance, national income, agricultural reforms, PRSP and MDG monitoring. He has also participated in Five Year Plans for government of Bangladesh. He was co-founding chairman for PKSF, the apex organization for funding the micro-credit programs of NGOs in Bangladesh.

Mahmud said Chittagong Port should be kept out of political programs and warned about the dangers to the economy from political confrontation in June 2006. He was the chairperson of the advisory council of Citi Micro-entrepreneurship Awards. In 2011, he condemned the government taking control of Grameen Bank from Muhammad Yunus.

In 2019, Mahmud called for the repatriation of Rohingya refugees in Bangladesh as he reasoned Bangladesh does not have the capacity to host them. He called for not using GDP as the only indicator of development and should consider living standards.

In September 2022, Mahmud filed a police complaint after his Facebook page was hacked.

Mahmud condemned the arrest of Mirza Fakhrul Islam Alamgir in October 2023, before the general election. On 15 August 2024, he was appointed an advisor of the Interim government led by Muhammad Yunus. He was placed in charge of the Ministry of Education and the Ministry of Planning.

== Personal life ==
Mahmud was married to Simeen Mahmud (died 2018), daughter of Mirza Nurul Huda, the third Vice President of Bangladesh.

== Books ==
- Chowdhury, Anis; Mahmud, Wahiduddin (2008). Handbook on the South Asian economies. Cheltenham, UK: Edward Elgar. ISBN 978-1-84844-129-3.
- Mahmud, Wahiuddin; Osmani, S. R. (2011). Theory and Practice of Microcredit. Routledge. ISBN 978-0-415-68680-8.
- Khandker, Shahidur R.; Mahmud, Wahiduddin (2012). Seasonal Hunger and Public Policies: Evidence from Northwest Bangladesh. Washington D.C.: World Bank. ISBN 978-0-8213-9554-7.
- —— (2021). Markets, Morals and Development: Rethinking Economics from a Developing Country Perspective. Routledge. ISBN 978-1-000-48508-0.
- Markets, Morals and Development: Rethinking Economics from a Developing Country Perspective (Routledge, 2021) ISBN 9781032149240.
