= A. K. M. Nurul Islam =

Vice President of Bangladesh from 1986 to 1989

- এ কে এম নূরুল ইসলাম

6th Vice President of Bangladesh
- In office 1 December 1986 – 12 August 1989
- President: Hussain Muhammad Ershad
- Preceded by: Mohammad Mohammadullah
- Succeeded by: Moudud Ahmed

Minister of Law
- In office 17 February 1985 – 12 August 1989
- President: Hussain Muhammad Ershad
- Prime Minister: Ataur Rahman Khan; Mizanur Rahman Chowdhury; Moudud Ahmed

Minister of Education
- In office 24 March 1986 – 25 May 1986
- Preceded by: Mohammed Abdul Matin
- Succeeded by: Mohammed Abdul Matin

Chief Election Commissioner of Bangladesh
- In office 8 July 1977 – 17 February 1985
- President: Ziaur Rahman; Abdus Sattar; Ahsanuddin Chowdhury; Hussain Muhammad Ershad
- Prime Minister: Mashiur Rahman; Shah Azizur Rahman; Ataur Rahman Khan
- Preceded by: M. Idris
- Succeeded by: Chowdhury A. T. M. Masud

Personal details
- Born: 1 August 1919 Manikganj, Bengal, British India
- Died: 14 November 2015 (aged 96) Dhaka, Bangladesh
- Resting place: Harirampur, Manikganj District
- Spouse: Jahanara Arzu
- Children: Md. Ashfaqul Islam (son)

A. K. M. Nurul Islam (died 14 November 2015) was a Bangladeshi judge and the vice president of Bangladesh from 1986 to 1989.

== Early life and education ==
Islam was born to M. Abdus Sobhan and Atafunnesa Khanam. He completed a master's degree in English literature at Calcutta University in 1947. He earned an LLB in 1950.

== Career ==
Islam was a judge of the East Pakistan High Court from 1967 to 1971.

He was the chief election commissioner of Bangladesh Election Commission from 1977 to 1984. From February 1985 until August 1989, he served as the law minister. In 1986, he was the member of parliament for Manikganj-2. He was appointed the vice president of the country on 1 December 1986 by the then President Hussain Muhammad Ershad.

He was replaced as vice president in August 1989.

== Personal life ==
Islam was married to Jahanara Arzu, an Ekushey Padak-winning poet. Together they had two sons including Justice Md. Ashfaqul Islam and a daughter, professor Minara Zahan.

Islam died on 14 November 2015 in Dhaka. He was buried in Harirampur in Manikganj District.
