= Md. Ashfaqul Islam =

Bangladeshi judge

The Honourable Md. Ashfaqul Islam
- মো. আশফাকুল ইসলাম
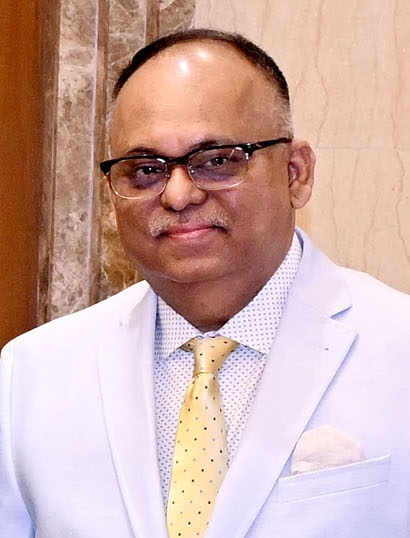
- Islam in 2024

Justice of the Appellate Division, Supreme Court
- Incumbent
- Assumed office 8 December 2022

Justice of the High Court Division of Bangladesh
- In office 23 August 2003 – 7 December 2022

Personal details
- Born: 15 July 1959 (age 67)
- Parents: A. K. M. Nurul Islam (father); Jahanara Arzu (mother)
- Profession: Judge

Md. Ashfaqul Islam is a judge of the Appellate Division, Supreme Court of Bangladesh.

== Early life ==
Islam was born on 15 July 1959. His father was A. K. M. Nurul Islam, former vice president of Bangladesh. He completed his bachelor's degree and master's in law from the University of Dhaka.

== Career ==
Islam became a lawyer of the district court in 1983. In 1985, Islam became a lawyer of the High Court Division of the Bangladesh Supreme Court. On 27 August 2003, Islam was appointed an additional judge of the High Court Division. He was made a permanent judge of the High Court Division 27 August 2005.

On 14 December 2010, Islam and Justice SM Emdadul Hoque issued a verdict against Gulshan Club ordering it to pay taxes and rejecting its claim to tax-exempt status.

On 21 June 2011, Islam and Justice M. Moazzam Husain issued a contempt of court ruling against the government of Bangladesh for preventing Barrister Nasir Uddin Asim, a Bangladesh Nationalist Party politician, and his family from leaving the country despite securing a verdict of the High Court Division that asked the government not to obstruct him from traveling abroad.

On 3 August 2013, Justices Quazi Reza-Ul Hoque and A B M Altaf Hossain summoned Jamaluddin Ahmed, chairman of Biman Bangladesh Airlines, for not upgrading the seats of High Court Division Judges Md Ashfaqul Islam and Quazi Reza-Ul Hoque from economy class to business class.

On 7 April 2015, Islam and Justice Kashefa Hussain issued a contempt of court ruling against Md Mosharraf Hossain, director of Bangladesh Shishu Academy, and Tariqul Islam, secretary of Ministry of Women and Children Affairs, for failing to return land of the Bangladesh Supreme Court occupied by the Shishu Academy.

Islam and Justice KM Kamrul Kader issued a contempt of court ruling on 1 March 2018 against the director general of Bangladesh Fire Service and Civil Defence, Brigadier General Ali Ahmad Khan, the director general of Bangladesh Railway, Md Amzad Hossain, and the director of operation and maintenance for Bangladesh Fire Service and Civil Defence Major Shakil Newaz for failure to obey a High Court order directing them to pay compensation to the family of Jihad. Jihad was four-year-old who fell down a well shaft on 26 December 2014 at Shahjahanpur Railway Colony. The Fire Department was called and they failed to find the boy and declared no one was inside the well. The next day the body of the boy was recovered from the well by locals. On 3 December 2018, Islam and Justice Mohammad Ali rejected a petition by Andaleeve Rahman Partho, chairman of Bangladesh Jatiya Party, seeking electronic voting machines for election in his constituency of Bhola-1 for the next parliamentary elections.

On 8 December 2020, Islam and Justice Mohammad Ali ordered the government of Bangladesh to remove illegal structures built on banks of the Karnaphuli.

Islam and Justice Mohammad Ali issued a verdict against Bangladesh Bank on 18 March for not including more information on the role of President Sheikh Mujibur Rahman. On 13 December 2021, Islam and Justice Iqbal Kabir Lytton upheld the copyright claim of Sheikh Abdul Hakim, ghost writer of Masud Rana, to over 300 books.

On 14 March 2022, Islam and Justice Md Iqbal Kabir ordered the government to take steps to translate laws from English to Bengali. He was elevated to the Appellate Division from High Court in December 2022.

Following the resignation of Obaidul Hassan in the aftermath of protests against the court during the Non-cooperation movement (2024) on 10 August, Islam was named acting chief justice of Bangladesh, before the appointment of Syed Refaat Ahmed to this position on the same day.
