= Mirza Nurul Huda =

Vice President of Bangladesh from 1981 to 1982, Governor of East Pakistan in 1969

Honorable Mirza Nurul Huda HEK
- মীর্জা নূরুল হুদা
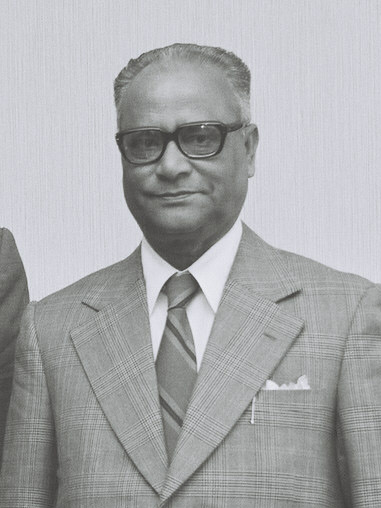
- Huda in 1976

4th Vice President of Bangladesh
- In office 24 November 1981 – 23 March 1982
- President: Abdus Sattar
- Preceded by: Abdus Sattar
- Succeeded by: Mohammad Mohammadullah

Minister of Bangladesh
- In office 15 April 1979 – 24 April 1980
- President: Ziaur Rahman
- Ministry: Finance
- Preceded by: A R Mallick
- Succeeded by: Saifur Rahman
- In office 29 June 1978 – 15 April 1979
- President: Ziaur Rahman
- Ministry: Planning
- Preceded by: Abu Sadat Mohammad Sayem
- Succeeded by: Fasihuddin Mahtab

11th Governor of East Pakistan
- In office 23 March 1969 – 25 March 1969
- President: Ayub Khan
- Preceded by: Abdul Monem Khan
- Succeeded by: Muzaffaruddin

8th Finance Minister of East Pakistan
- In office 29 March 1965 – 23 March 1969
- Governor: Abdul Monem Khan
- Preceded by: Md. Hafizur Rahman
- Succeeded by: Mohammad Abul Quasem

Personal details
- Born: 1 August 1919 Jangalia, Bengal Presidency, British India
- Died: 22 December 1991 (aged 72) Shahbag, Dhaka, Bangladesh
- Spouse: Kulsum Huda
- Relations: Maulvi Tamizuddin Khan (father-in-law); Wahiduddin Mahmud (son-in-law)
- Children: 3, including Simeen
- Education: Cornell University (PhD in agricultural economics)
- Occupation: Professor
- Awards: Hilal-e-Khidmat (1968)

Mirza Nurul Huda (1919–1991) was a Bangladeshi economist and political figure. He served as Vice President of Bangladesh, Minister of Finance and Planning of Bangladesh, Governor of East Pakistan, and Finance Minister of East Pakistan.

== Early life ==
Huda was born on 1 August 1919 in Jangalia, Tangail Thana, Mymensingh District, Bengal Presidency, British India (present-day Delduar Upazila, Tangail District, Bangladesh). He studied at Bindu Basini Govt. Boys' High School. After passing the secondary examination in 1935, he passed the Intermediate of Arts from Dhaka College in 1937. In 1940, he earned a Bachelor of Arts degree in economics from the University of Dhaka. After receiving the Raja Kali Narayan Scholarship, he earned a Master of Arts degree in economics in 1941. He began his career as a lecturer in economics at Government Saadat College and Rajshahi College. In 1944, he joined the Bengal Civil Service and in 1947, the year of partition of India, traveled to the United States to pursue a PhD in agricultural economics at Cornell University. In the same year, he was appointed Reader in Economics at the University of Dhaka. He completed his PhD in 1949 and in 1955 traveled to the United Kingdom for a fellowship at Oxford's Nuffield College. In 1960, he was promoted to Professor of Economics at the University of Dhaka. In 1962, he was appointed a member of the Planning Commission of the government of Pakistan and served in this position for three years. At the same time, he served as a member of the Planning Board of the government of East Pakistan and as a member of the Tax Inquiry Committee and Credit Inquiry Commission of the central government.

== Later life ==
In 1965, he became president of the Pakistan Economic Association. In the same year, he was appointed finance minister of East Pakistan and served in the position until 1969. During the 1969 East Pakistan mass uprising, he was appointed governor of East Pakistan in 23 March. However, after serving as governor for only one day, his tenure came to an end when martial law was imposed. After returning to teaching, he was appointed chairman of the Department of Economics at the University of Dhaka. Following the independence of Bangladesh, in 1975 he was appointed adviser to the President's Council of Ministers for agriculture, commerce, finance, industry, and planning. In 1976, he became president of the Bangladesh Economic Association. In 1978, he was appointed Bangladesh's planning minister. In 1979, he was appointed the country's finance minister. From 1976 to 1980, he served as Bangladesh's representative to the World Bank, International Monetary Fund, Asian Development Bank, and Islamic Development Bank. He then served as chairman of the Social Science Research Council and SEED Bangladesh from 1980 to 1985. From 1981 to 1982, he served as Vice President of Bangladesh.

== Family, death and legacy ==
Nurul Huda was married to Kulsum Huda, a daughter of Speaker of Pakistan's National Assembly Maulvi Tamizuddin Khan. Kulsum was one of the founders and vice chancellors of Central Women's University. Their daughter Simeen Mahmud (d. 2018) was a demographer at the Bangladesh Institute of Development Studies. Simeen was married to the economist Wahiduddin Mahmud. Nurul's eldest son Mirza Najmul Huda is an economist. Another daughter is Zareen Huda Ahmed.

Huda was admitted to Ibrahim Memorial Diabetes Centre (present-day BIRDEM) in Dhaka, Bangladesh, on 14 December 1991 after falling ill with heart disease. He died at the hospital in 22 December of the same year.

Huda was awarded the Hilal-e-Khidmat in 1968. Twenty research papers authored by him were published in various domestic and international journals. He edited the book The Test of Time: My Life and Days, written by Maulvi Tamizuddin Khan. In 2021, his autobiography, titled ‘My Seven Decades’ Journey Through British India, Pakistan and Bangladesh, was published by The University Press Limited.
