= Asad Islam =

Development economist

- Islam in 2025
- Other name: Asadul Islam

Academic background
- Thesis: (2009)
- Doctoral advisor: Pushkar Maitra

Academic work
- Institutions: Monash University

Asad Islam (also published as Asadul Islam) is a development economist and professor of economics at Monash University in Australia, where he directs the Centre for Development Economics and Sustainability (CDES). His research uses field experiments and survey data to study topics including education, health, microfinance, food security, technology adoption, gender, social networks and corruption, mainly in Bangladesh and other developing countries.

== Early life and education ==
Islam has written that he grew up in a rural village in Bangladesh. He received a BSS (Honours) in economics in 1998 and an MSS in 2000 from the University of Dhaka, an MA in economics from the University of Saskatchewan in 2003, and a PhD in economics from Monash University in 2009. His doctoral adviser was Pushkar Maitra. His thesis received Monash's Mollie Holman Doctoral Medal for the best thesis of the year in the Faculty of Business and Economics.

== Career ==
Islam was a lecturer in economics at the University of Dhaka in 2001 and worked at the Bangladesh Institute of Development Studies (BIDS) as a research associate (2001–2005) and research fellow (2006–2009). He joined Monash University as a lecturer in 2009, became a senior lecturer in 2012 and an associate professor in 2015, and was later promoted to professor. He is director of CDES and a chief investigator at the ARC Centre of Excellence for the Elimination of Violence Against Women. He is also an affiliated professor of the Abdul Latif Jameel Poverty Action Lab (J-PAL).

His research has been funded by bodies including the Australian Research Council, the UK Economic and Social Research Council, DFID/FCDO, Australia's Department of Foreign Affairs and Trade, the International Growth Centre, the European Commission, the Asian Development Bank and the World Bank. He received an ARC Discovery Early Career Researcher Award (2012–2015).

== Research ==
Islam's work includes studies of microfinance and household outcomes in Bangladesh, the long-term effects of civil conflict in Cambodia, and resource sharing among households after Cyclone Aila in Bangladesh. He has also worked on randomized controlled trials of early childhood and parental-involvement interventions in Bangladesh and of playful-learning programmes in Uganda and Tanzania.

== Selected publications ==
- Islam, Asadul; Maitra, Pushkar (2012). "Health shocks and consumption smoothing in rural households: Does microcredit have a role to play?". Journal of Development Economics. 97 (2): 232–243. Bibcode:2012JDevE..97..232I. doi:10.1016/j.jdeveco.2011.05.003.
- Islam, Asadul; Ouch, Chandarany; Smyth, Russell; Wang, Liang Choon (2016). "The long-term effects of civil conflicts on education, earnings, and fertility: Evidence from Cambodia". Journal of Comparative Economics. 44 (3): 800–820. doi:10.1016/j.jce.2015.05.001.
- Islam, Asad; Nguyen, Chau (2018). "Do networks matter after a natural disaster? A study of resource sharing within an informal network after Cyclone Aila". Journal of Environmental Economics and Management. 90: 249–268. Bibcode:2018JEEM...90..249I. doi:10.1016/j.jeem.2018.06.007.
