= Latifur Rahman ministry =

16th Council of Ministers of Bangladesh

- 16th Council of Ministers and 6th Council of Advisers of the People’s Republic of Bangladesh
- Date formed: 15 July 2001
- Date dissolved: 10 October 2001

People and organisations
- President: Shahabuddin Ahmed
- Chief Adviser: Latifur Rahman
- Total no. of members: 11
- Status in legislature: Dissolved

History
- Outgoing election: 2001
- Predecessor: Hasina I
- Successor: Khaleda III

The Latifur Rahman cabinet led the Caretaker government of Bangladesh from 15 July 2001 to 10 October 2001.

== List of Advisors ==
Portfolio	Minister	Took office	Left office
Chief Adviser and also in-charge of: Cabinet Division; Ministry of Establishment; Ministry of Home Affairs; Ministry of Foreign Affairs; Bangladesh Election Commission; Ministry of Chittagong Hill Tracts Affairs	Latifur Rahman	15 July 2001	10 October 2001
Adviser of Law, Justice and Parliamentary Affairs; Adviser of Civil Aviation and Tourism	Syed Ishtiaq Ahmed	16 July 2001	10 October 2001
Adviser of Local Government, Rural Development and Co-operatives; Adviser of Disaster Management and Relief	Bimalendu Bikash Roy Chowdhury	16 July 2001	10 October 2001
Adviser of Industries; Adviser of Commerce; Adviser of Posts and Telecommunications	Moinul Hossain Chowdhury	16 July 2001	10 October 2001
Adviser of Finance; Adviser of Planning; Adviser of Jute; Adviser of Textiles	M Hafizuddin Khan	16 July 2001	10 October 2001
Adviser of Agriculture; Adviser of Shipping; Adviser of Fisheries and Livestock	Syed Manzur Elahi	16 July 2001	10 October 2001
Adviser of Health and Family Welfare; Adviser of Religious Affairs	Abdul Malik	16 July 2001	10 October 2001
Adviser of Education; Adviser of Primary and Mass Education; Adviser of Science and Technology; Adviser of Youth and Sports	A. S. M. Shahjahan	16 July 2001	10 October 2001
Adviser of Information; Adviser of Housing and Public Works; Adviser of Food; Adviser of Environment and Forests; Adviser of Land	Abdul Muyeed Chowdhury	16 July 2001	10 October 2001
Adviser of Women and Children Affairs; Adviser of Social Welfare; Adviser of Labour and Employment; Adviser of Cultural Affairs	Rokeya Afzal Rahman	15 July 2001	10 October 2001
Adviser of Power, Energy and Mineral Resources; Adviser of Communications; Adviser of Water Resources	AKM Amanul Islam Chowdhury	16 July 2001	10 October 2001
