= Salehuddin Ahmed (economist) =

Bangladeshi economist (born 1949)

- সালেহউদ্দিন আহমেদ
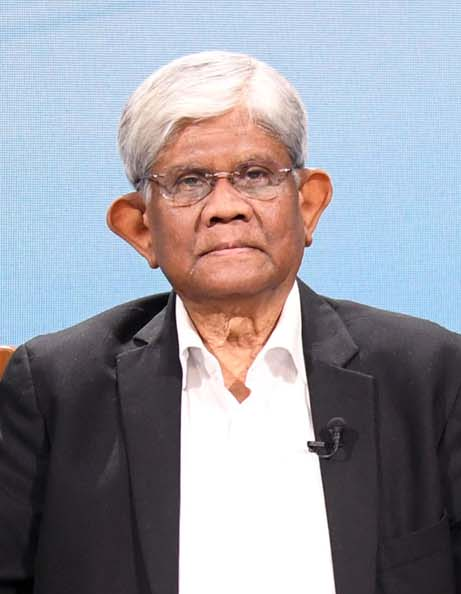
- Ahmed in 2025

Adviser for Finance
- In office 9 August 2024 – 17 February 2026
- President: Mohammed Shahabuddin
- Chief Adviser: Muhammad Yunus
- Preceded by: Abul Hassan Mahmood Ali
- Succeeded by: Amir Khasru Mahmud Chowdhury

Adviser for Science and Technology
- In office 22 August 2024 – 17 February 2026
- President: Mohammed Shahabuddin
- Chief Adviser: Muhammad Yunus
- Preceded by: Yeafesh Osman
- Succeeded by: Fakir Mahbub Anam Swapan

Adviser for Commerce
- In office 16 August 2024 – 10 November 2024
- President: Mohammed Shahabuddin
- Chief Adviser: Muhammad Yunus
- Preceded by: Ahasanul Islam Titu
- Succeeded by: Sheikh Bashir Uddin

Adviser for Planning
- In office 9 August 2024 – 16 August 2024
- President: Mohammed Shahabuddin
- Chief Adviser: Muhammad Yunus
- Preceded by: Abdus Salam
- Succeeded by: Wahiduddin Mahmud

Governor of Bangladesh Bank
- In office 30 April 2005 – 1 May 2009
- President: Iajuddin Ahmed; Zillur Rahman
- Prime Minister: Khaleda Zia; Fazlul Haque; Fakhruddin Ahmed; Sheikh Hasina
- Preceded by: Fakhruddin Ahmed
- Succeeded by: Atiur Rahman

Personal details
- Born: 8 October 1949 (age 76) Nazirabazar, Bengal, British India
- Party: Independent
- Education: University of Dhaka (BA, MA); McMaster University (PhD)

Salehuddin Ahmed (born 1949) is a Bangladeshi economist, who has served as the adviser to the Interim government of Bangladesh from August 2024 to February 2026. He is also a former governor of the Bangladesh Bank. He was also a Professor of BRAC University.

During his tenure as finance adviser, his move to dissolve the National Board of Revenue and bring revenue management under his direct ministerial control has been criticized as executive capture of the revenue sector. Transparency International Bangladesh and the Centre for Policy Dialogue argued that Ahmed's initiative undermined the autonomy of the revenue service, weakened accountability, and reduced transparency and neutrality. They also said that the initiative ignored the recommendations of the government’s own advisory committee on revenue reform and risked weaponizing taxes and tariffs, worsening existing systemic problems and bureaucratic dysfunction.

Salehuddin Ahmed has also faced criticism for prioritizing Bangladesh's international image over addressing substantive domestic issues, stating that "excessive criticism of the government does not leave a good impression internationally" and damages the country's image abroad, suggesting a defensive approach that deflects from real problems.

== Early life and education ==
Ahmed was born in Mahuttuli, Old Dhaka and his family were originally from the village of Darisrirampur in Nabinagar Upazila, Brahmanbaria District. He graduated from Dhaka Collegiate School in 1963 and from Dhaka College in 1965. Ahmed earned his masters in 1969 in economics from the University of Dhaka. He completed his second masters and PhD from McMaster University in 1974 and 1978, respectively.

== Career ==
Ahmed joined the University of Dhaka as a lecturer and later joined the Civil Service of Pakistan. He was appointed the Assistant Commissioner of Dhaka District. He served as the executive magistrate of Pirojpur District. He worked at the National Foundation for Research on Human Resource Development which merged with Bangladesh Institute of Development Studies later. He worked at the Centre on Integrated Rural Development for Asia and the Pacific.

Ahmed is a former Director General of Bangladesh Academy for Rural Development from 1993 to 1995. Ahmed was the Director General of the NGO Affairs Bureau at the Prime Minister's Office.

Ahmed was the Managing Director of Palli Karma Sahayak Foundation from 1996 to 2005. In 1998, he joined BRAC as Deputy Executive Director.

Ahmed was the ninth governor of Bangladesh Bank. After the retirement of Fakhruddin Ahmed, he took the responsibility of Bangladesh Bank on 1 May 2005 and he took rest from his duty on 31 April 2009. As a Fulbright Scholar, he taught at Marlboro College in the State of Vermont in the United States for a year. In 2006, he received the Distinguished Alumni Award back from McMaster University.

From 2009, Ahmed taught at North South University and the University of Dhaka. He was a professor of business at North South University from 2010 to 2014 and then joined BRAC University. He is a trustee of Gono University.

In 2020, Ahmed was appointed an independent director of ASA International. He is one of the founders of the Centre for Advanced Research and Social Action, non-profit. He is a member of the general committee of the NGO Forum. He was an independent director of GrameenPhone. He is an advisor to Southeast University Journal of Arts and Social Sciences of Southeast University.

== Personal life ==
Ahmed's daughter is also a faculty at North South University. His son was a faculty member at Black Hills State University and is currently a senior economist at the Virginia Department of Taxation.

== Awards and Achievements ==
1. Awarded Nawab Sir Salimullah Foundation Gold Medal in 2006.

2. Distinguished Alumni Award from McMaster University, Ontario, Canada at the Convocation held in Hamilton in November 2006.

3. Mercantile Bank Award 2014 for Economics.
