= Jahanara Arzu =

Bangladeshi poet (1932–2026)

- জাহানারা আরজু
- Born: 1 June 1932; Manikganj, Bengal Presidency, British India
- Died: 2 March 2026 (aged 93); Dhaka, Bangladesh
- Occupations: Poet, editor
- Spouse: A K M Nurul Islam
- Children: Md. Ashfaqul Islam; Minara Zahan
- Awards: Ekushey Padak

Jahanara Arzu (17 November 1932 – 2 March 2026) was a Bangladeshi poet. She was awarded Ekushey Padak in 1987 by the Government of Bangladesh for her contribution to Bengali literature. Arzu and Sufia Kamal were the founding editors of Sultana, the first women's weekly published from East Bengal on 14 January 1949.

Arzu was married to a former Vice President of Bangladesh and Justice A. K. M. Nurul Islam. Together, they had two sons including Justice Md. Ashfaqul Islam and professor Minara Zahan. Arzu died on 2 March 2026, at the age of 93.
