= M. Moazzam Husain =

Bangladeshi judge

Justice of the High Court Division of Bangladesh

Personal details
- Profession: Judge

M. Moazzam Husain is a judge of the High Court Division of Bangladesh Supreme Court.

== Career ==
On 21 June 2011, Husain and Justice Md. Ashfaqul Islam issued a contempt of court ruling against the government of Bangladesh for preventing Barrister Nasir Uddin Asim, a Bangladesh Nationalist Party politician, and his family from leaving the country despite securing a verdict of the High Court Division that asked the government not to obstruct him from travelling abroad.

Husain and Justice Md Badruzzman rejected a petition against the Rampal Power Plant in October 2013 clearing the way for the construction of the powerplant. In August 2013, Husain and Justice M Enayetur Rahim and Justice Quazi Reza-Ul Hoque issued an order that deregistered Bangladesh Jamaat-e-Islami with the election commission which effectively banned the party from standing in elections.

In December 2016, Husain and Justice Md Badruzzaman stayed for three months the appointment of Shamim Osman, member of parliament, as the head of the managing committee of Dapa Adorsh High School and asked why the appointment should not be declared illegal.
