= Piash Karim =

Bangladeshi political scientist (b. 1958, d. 2014)

Piash Karim

Manjur Karim Piash (Bengali: মনজুর করিম পিয়াস; 1958 – October 13, 2014) popularly known as Piash Karim was a professor, researcher and political commentator with specializations in political economy, political sociology, nationalism and social theory. After Bangladesh achieved independence, he completed his bachelor's degree from the University of Dhaka and went to the US for higher studies. In his long career as a teacher, he taught at the University of Nebraska–Lincoln, Culver–Stockton College and BRAC University.

== Early life and education ==
Karim was born in 1958 in Comilla. His father M.A. Karim was a member of the founding committee of the Comilla unit of the Awami League, and served as the treasurer of the Awami League district unit for a long time. His uncle served as the second inspector general of police. Piash Karim received his primary education from Comilla Modern School and secondary education from Comilla Zilla School. He completed his higher secondary education from Adamjee Cantonment College, Dhaka.

Later, Karim obtained his Bachelor of Arts degree from the University of Dhaka. He completed his master's degree and PhD in sociology at Kansas State University after moving to the United States. He was arrested by the Pakistan Army during the Bangladesh Liberation War of 1971 for distributing leaflets in favour of the freedom movement of Bangladesh.

== Career ==
Karim, after completing his master's degree and PhD, served as a faculty member of two American universities for seventeen years. He joined the University of Nebraska–Lincoln as a faculty member. Later, he worked as an associate professor at Culver–Stockton College, Missouri for another few years. In 2007, he returned to Bangladesh and joined BRAC University as a professor in the Economics and Social Sciences Department. In Bangladesh, he wrote several articles on nationalist politics, civil society and media activism.

=== Views ===
Karim was opposed to the Shahbag protests and criticized the neutrality of the International Crimes Tribunal.

== Personal life and death ==
Karim was married to Amena Mohsin, a professor of international relations at the University of Dhaka. On October 13, 2014, he died of cardiac arrest on his way to Square Hospital from his home at the age of 56. Nobel Laureate and prominent economist Muhammad Yunus mourned his sudden death, terming him as a "fearless and principled intellectual". After his death, the Awami League-oriented organizations threatened to desecrate his body if it was brought to the Shaheed Minar.
