= Legislative and Parliamentary Affairs Division =

- Government Seal of Bangladesh
- Formation: 2009
- Headquarters: Dhaka, Bangladesh
- Region served: Bangladesh
- Official language: Bengali
- Website: legislativediv.portal.gov.bd

Legislative and Parliamentary Affairs Division (Bengali: লেজিসলেটিভ ও সংসদ বিষয়ক বিভাগ) is a Bangladesh government department responsible for drafting and vetting legislation before they are placed in the parliament. The department ensures that all proposed laws are legally sound and meet treaty obligations of the government. It is also responsible for managing Bangladesh Law Commission and Bangladesh National Human Rights Commission. Naren Das is the secretary in charge of the division.

== History ==
In December 2009, the government of Bangladesh, led by Prime Minister Sheikh Hasina, divided the Ministry of Law, Justice and Parliamentary Affairs into the Legislative and Parliamentary Affairs Division and Law and Justice Division.

The Legislative and Parliamentary Affairs Division assists the government of Bangladesh in creating laws carrying out reforms of existing laws. In 2020, the government announced 400 million taka for the 2020-2021 budget session.
