= AKM Amanul Islam Chowdhury =

Bangladeshi political advisor (died 2020)

Amanul Islam Chowdhury
- এ কে এম আমানুল ইসলাম চৌধুরী
- Died: 27 July 2020 (aged 83-84); Dhaka, Bangladesh
- Education: University of Dhaka
- Children: One daughter, one son
- Relatives: Serajul Islam Choudhury (brother)

AKM Amanul Islam Chowdhury (died 27 July 2020) was a Bangladeshi caretaker government adviser. He served in the Latifur Rahman cabinet in charge of the Ministry of Communications, Ministry of Water Resources, and Ministry of Power, Energy and Mineral Resources.

== Career ==
Chowdhury served as a chairman of Chittagong Port Authority and Dhaka Power Supply Authority. He was also a general manager of Bangladesh Railway.

In later life, Chowdhury served as an advisor of Unique Group and a consultant of Westin Dhaka.

== Personal life ==
Chowdhury was a younger brother of the academician Serajul Islam Choudhury.

Chowdhury died on 27 July 2020, at Uttara's Crescent Hospital in Dhaka after contracting COVID-19.
