= Serajul Islam Choudhury =

Bangladeshi writer, essayist and teacher

- সিরাজুল ইসলাম চৌধুরী
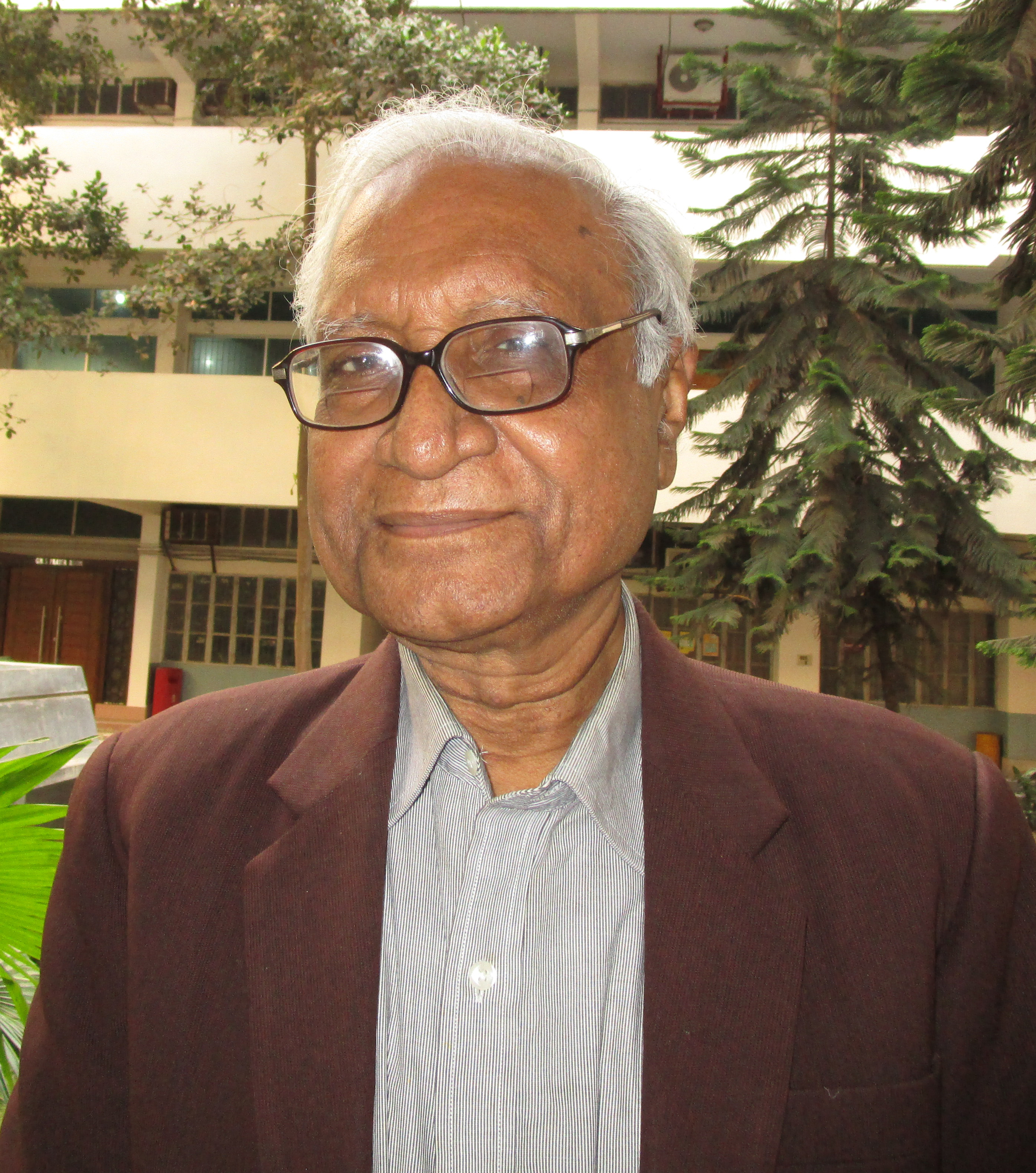
- Choudhury at the University of Dhaka (Feb 2015)
- Born: 23 June 1936 (age 90); Munshiganj, Province of Bengal, British India
- Education: Notre Dame College; University of Dhaka; The University of Leeds; Leicester University
- Spouse: Nazma Jesmin Choudhury
- Children: Rownak Ara Choudhury; Sharmin Choudhury
- Parents: Hafizuddin Chowdhury (father); Asia Khatun (mother)
- Relatives: Amanul Islam Chowdhury (brother); Fakrul Islam Chowdhury (brother)

Serajul Islam Choudhury (born 23 June 1936) is a Bangladeshi literary critic, public intellectual, social and political analyst, activist, historian, educationist, editor, translator, columnist, and professor emeritus at the University of Dhaka. He is the editor of Natun Diganta. Considered one of the foremost oppositional intellectuals of Bangladesh, he authored nearly a hundred books and countless essays in Bangla and English.

== Early life and education ==
Choudhury was born in the village of Baroikhali under the Sreenagar thana in the district of Munshigonj to Hafizuddin Chowdhury and Asia Khatun. He is the eldest of the nine brothers and four sisters including Amanul Islam Chowdhury (d. 2020) and Fakrul Islam Chowdhury (d. 2023). In his early life, he liked to build his career as a novelist, but his father wanted him to join the civil service after a degree in Economics. On a note of compromise, he enrolled with the English department at the University of Dhaka after an intermediate of arts degree, obtained in 1952 from Notre Dame College, preceded by his matriculation from St. Gregory's High School in 1950. He received his MA degree in 1956 and taught briefly at Haraganga College in Munshiganj and Jagannath College in Dhaka. He completed his post-graduate diploma in English Studies at The University of Leeds, the UK and obtained his doctorate in English from Leicester University, the UK.

== Career ==
Choudhury joined as a lecturer the Department of English, Dhaka University, in 1957, planning also to be a writer. He decided not to become a bureaucrat which many around him were becoming then. He stated two reasons why he wanted to be a writer: first, his work at the university, which would ensure that he would not be transferred from place to place and which would allow him time to read and write a lot; and, second, his temperament. In more than four decades that followed, he taught students, wrote essays, headed the department, became Dean, spawned off several academic and research projects, initiated doctoral dissertation guidance at the department, started periodicals, founded study centers, and remained involved in university politics. Choudhury first initiated to offer the Ph.D. degree in English at Dhaka University. He edited journals, the university journals of arts and letters, in Bangla and English — Dhaka Visvavidyalay Patrika for 15 years and Dhaka University Studies for nine years. He founded the Visvavidyalay Patrika. Choudhury also founded a national views weekly called Somoy and co-edited it with Azfar Hussain, Zaheda Ahmad et al, from the early to the mid-1990s. He founded the University Book Centre in 1978 and the Centre for Advanced Research in Humanities in 1986. In keeping with the spirit, he now runs a centre called Samaj Rupantar Adhyayan Kendra (Centre for Social Transformation Studies), which works towards waking people up to a democracy which would mean ‘equality of rights and opportunities. Rights being equal would not mean anything unless the opportunities remain equal.’

== Personal life ==
Choudhury was married to Nazma Jesmin Choudhury. She was a professor at the University of Dhaka. Their children are Rownak Ara Choudhury and Sharmin Choudhury.

== Awards ==
- Ekushey Padak
- Bangla Academy Literary Award
- University of Dhaka Gold Medal in Research
- Kazi Mahbubullah Award
- Bangladesh Writers Award
- Abdur Rahman Choudhury Award

== Selected publications ==
Choudhury's books in the Bengali language:

- Anveshana
- Nirbachita Prabandha (1999)
- Rashtra o Samskrti (1993)
- Nazrul Islam: Poet and More (1994) [Nazrul Institute]
- Bangalir Jaya Parajaya (1994)
- Apanajana (1992)

Choudhury's books in the English:

- —— (1975). The Moral Imagination of Joseph Conrad. University of Dhaka. OCLC 2875762.
- —— (1981). The Enemy Territory: A Study of Evil in D. H. Lawrence. University of Dhaka. OCLC 988367614.
- —— (2002). Middle Class and the Social Revolution in Bengal: An Incomplete Agenda. University Press. OCLC 603857008.
