= Habibul Islam Bhuiyan =

Bangladeshi lawyer and politician

Advocate Habibul Islam Bhuiyan
- হাবিবুল ইসলাম ভূঁইয়া

Minister of Law
- In office 2 May 1990 – 6 December 1990
- Preceded by: Moudud Ahmed
- Succeeded by: M A Khaleq

Personal details
- Education: University of Dhaka

Habibul Islam Bhuiyan Bangladeshi lawyer and politician who was the Minister of Law, Justice and Parliamentary Affairs of Bangladesh.

== Early life ==
Habibul Islam Bhuiyan was born in Kishoreganj. He passed BA in 1964 and MA in 1966 from Dhaka University. He passed LLB in 1968 from the same university.

== Career ==
Habibul Islam Bhuiyan Habibul Islam Bhuiyan started his career as a lawyer in 1965. He enrolled as a lawyer in the East Pakistan High Court in 1970 and as a lawyer in the Supreme Court of Pakistan in 1973. He is also registered as a senior lawyer in the Appellate Division of the Supreme Court of Bangladesh. He was appointed a judge of the High Court Division in 1988.

In Ershad's cabinet from 2 May 1990 to 6 December 1990, he served as the Minister of Law, Justice and Parliamentary Affairs of Bangladesh. He was elected President of the Supreme Court Bar Association in 1998.
