= Abdul Mannan Siddique =

Bangladeshi politician

- Died: 2 May 2000
- Military career
- Allegiance: Pakistan (before 1972); Bangladesh
- Branch: Pakistan Army; Bangladesh Army
- Service years: 1955–1984
- Rank: Major General
- Unit: Ordnance Corps
- Commands: Quartermaster General of Army Headquarters; MGO of Army Headquarters; GOC of 55th Infantry Division

Abdul Mannan Siddique (??–2000) (Bengali: আবদুল মান্নান সিদ্দিকী) was a major general of the Bangladesh Army. He had served as minister of home affairs and minister of housing and public works.

== Career ==
Siddique was commissioned from the 12th PMA Long Course on 18 September 1955 in the Ordnance Corps. He was a former quartermaster general of the Bangladesh Army. He was also the master general of ordinances. He served as the minister of home affairs and minister of housing and public works in the cabinet of Hussain Muhammad Ershad. After retirement he founded and served as the chairperson of Phoenix Insurance Company Limited.

== Death ==
Siddique died on 2 May 2000.
