= Nurul Islam Chowdhury =

Bangladeshi politician

Member of Bangladesh Parliament
- In office 1973–1976
- Succeeded by: Nazrul Islam

Personal details
- Born: 1925
- Died: 3 October 1995
- Political party: Bangladesh Awami League

Nurul Islam Chowdhury (1925–3 October 1995) was a Bangladesh Awami League politician and a former member of parliament for Chittagong-11.

== Career ==
He was elected to parliament from Chittagong-11 as a Bangladesh Awami League candidate in 1973.
