= Amena Mohsin =

Bangladeshi academics

Amena Mohsin is a former professor and chairperson of the Department of International Relations at the University of Dhaka. She is an adjunct professor of North South University. She works on ethnic minorities, civil military relations, democracy and nationalism.

== Early life ==
Mohsin was born on 22 January 1958. She did her undergrad and masters at the University of Dhaka in 1980 and 1981. She did a second masters at the University of Hawaiʻi at Mānoa in 1986 and her PhD at the University of Cambridge in 1996.

== Career ==
Mohsin founded the Department of Women and Gender Studies at the University of Dhaka. She recorded testimonies of Birangona for the Ain o Salish Kendra. She signed a letter in 2011 criticizing the government of Bangladesh for removing Professor Muhammad Yunus from the post of chairman of Grameen Bank. She expressed concern over a contempt of court rule against professor Asif Nazrul. She asked the government of Bangladesh to leave Grameen Bank alone.

Mohsin conducted a study on extremism in university students along with by professor lmtiaz Ahmed, and professor Delwar Hossain in 2017. She was critical of the defense treaty between India and Bangladesh.

Mohsin was a critic of the 2024 general election describing it as neither free or fair election.

== Bibliography ==
- The Politics of Nationalism: The Case of Chittagong Hill Tracts, Bangladesh
- The Chittagong Hill Tracts, Bangladesh: On The Difficult Road To Peace
- Ethnic Minorities of Bangladesh: Some Reflections the Saontals and Rakhaines
- Women and Militancy: South Asian Complexities
- Conflict and Partition
- Of the Nation Born: The Bangladesh Papers
- Women and Work in South Asia: Rights and Innovation
- Human Rights in Bangladesh: Past, Present and Future

== Personal life ==
Mohsin was married to professor Anisur Rahman. They had one son, Mufrad Nabeel Rahman, who died in 2008. She was married to Piash Karim (died 2014)
