= Zakir Khan Chowdhury =

Zakir Khan Chowdhury was a politician and a minister in the cabinet of President Hussain Muhammad Ershad.

== Career ==
From July 1985 to June 1986, Chowdhury was the Minister of Youth and Sports. Chowdhury later served as an advisor of freedom fighter affairs with the rank of a minister.
