= M. Hafizuddin Khan =

Bangladeshi politician (1936/1937–2026)

M. Hafizuddin Khan-
- এম হাফিজ উদ্দিন খান

Adviser of Finance, Planning, Jute and Textiles in Caretaker Government of Bangladesh
- In office 15 July 2001 – 10 October 2001

Personal details
- Born: 1936 or 1937 Sirajganj, Bengal Province, British India (now Bangladesh)
- Died: 21 January 2026 (aged 89) Uttara, Dhaka, Bangladesh
- Education: University of Dhaka; University of Birmingham
- Occupation: Economist, political analyst

M. Hafizuddin Khan (1936 or 1937 – 21 January 2026) was a Bangladeshi career bureaucrat, 6th comptroller and auditor general of Bangladesh, and adviser to the caretaker government heading the Ministries of Finance, Planning, Jute and Textiles.

== Early life ==
Khan completed his B.A. and M.A. in political science from Dhaka University in 1961. He obtained a diploma in Development Finance from the University of Birmingham.

== Career ==
Khan joined the Central Civil Service of Pakistan in 1964 as an Audit and Accounts cadre. He served in the railway Accounts Service and Defence Finance Department. He was placed in the senior service pool of the Government of Bangladesh in 1977. He served as a director at BASIC Bank Limited and Rupali Bank. He was the chairman of Agrani Bank. He also did a stint in the Prime Minister's Secretariat. He was the 6th Comptroller and Auditor General of Bangladesh. He retired in 1999 from the government service. He was the chairperson of the Board of Trustees of Transparency International Bangladesh. He was the vice-president of Anjuman Mofidul Islam. He was the founder-chairman of a civil society organization named Citizens for Good Governance (SHUJAN). He was a director of MIDAS Financing Limited.

He served as an adviser in the caretaker government, Latifur Rahman Cabinet in 2001. He was in charge of the Ministries of Finance, Planning, Jute, and Textiles with the rank of minister.

== Death ==
Khan died at a private hospital in Uttara, Dhaka, on 21 January 2026, at the age of 89.
