= National Legal Aid Services Organization =

Statutory organization in Bangladesh

- Formation: 2001
- Headquarters: Dhaka, Bangladesh
- Region served: Bangladesh
- Official language: Bengali
- Website: nlaso.gov.bd

The National Legal Aid Services Organization (জাতীয় আইনগত সহায়তা প্রদান সংস্থা) is a statutory organization of the Bangladesh government under the Ministry of Law, Justice and Parliamentary Affairs responsible for providing legal aid to poor Bangladeshis.In addition to this, it also provides legal advice to all. SK. Ashfaqur Rahman is a senior district judge and the current executive director(Grade -1) of the organization.

== Function ==
On 1st July,2025 drastic changes have been brought.Now, the mandatory meditation initiative has been introduced under 9 laws mentioned to the schedule of Legal Aid Services (Amendment) Ordinance, 2025.

== History ==
The National Legal Aid Services Organization was established in 2000 based on bill for legal aid passed by the parliament of Bangladesh. In 2009, the Government of Bangladesh increased the power and functions of the organization.
