= Sufia Rahman =

Indian politician

Health and Family Welfare Adviser
- In office 2006–2007
- President: Iajuddin Ahmed

Personal details
- Occupation: Consultant
- Known for: Adviser in the caretaker government ; Chief advisor of Euro-Bangla Heart Hospital Ltd.

Sufia Rahman is a former Health and Family Welfare Adviser of the government of Bangladesh. She served in the caretaker government of President Iajuddin Ahmed in 2006–2007. She is a consultant and chief advisor of Euro-Bangla Heart Hospital Ltd.
