= 1982 Bangladeshi coup d'état =

1982 military coup in Bangladesh

1982 Siege of Dhaka
- Part of the Cold War
Date	March 24, 1982
Location	Bangladesh
Result	Successful coup: Abdus Sattar deposed

Belligerents
Government of Bangladesh; Bangladesh Nationalist Party	Bangladesh Armed Forces; Bangladesh Army

Commanders and leaders
(Bangladesh) Abdus Sattar	(Bangladesh) H. M. Ershad

Lieutenant General Hussain Muhammad Ershad, the then-chief of Army Staff of Bangladesh, led a coup d'état against the then-president of Bangladesh, Abdus Sattar, in 1982. After serving initially as the Chief Martial Law Administrator and installing a civilian president, Justice A. F. M. Ahsanuddin Chowdhury, Ershad assumed presidency in 1983 and ruled until 1990.

== Background ==
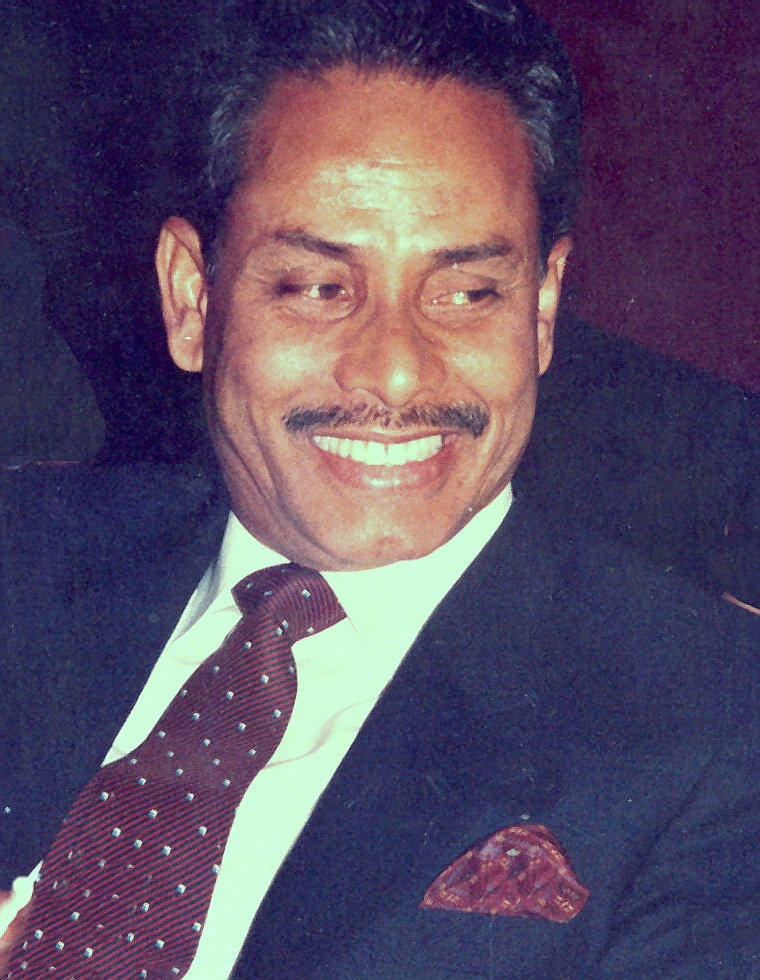
Ershad pictured in 1986.

After its independence in 1971, Bangladesh saw a series of military coups, beginning with the assassination of President Sheikh Mujibur Rahman on August 15, 1975, by a group of army officers, who installed Khondaker Mostaq Ahmed as president. The Khondaker Mostaq regime was overthrown on November 3 of the same year by pro-Mujib officers led by Brigadier Khaled Mosharraf and Colonel Shafat Jamil. A counter-coup on November 7 brought army chief Maj. Gen. Ziaur Rahman to power. In 1977, Ziaur Rahman assumed the post of president and handed over the post of army chief to Lt. Gen. Hussain Muhammad Ershad. Zia formed the Bangladesh Nationalist Party (BNP) and sought to reintroduce democracy in Bangladesh, but in 1981, he was assassinated by a group of army officers. It was a conspiracy of Lt. Gen. Hussain Muhammad Ershad which he framed Maj. Gen. Abul Manzoor for the coup. Sortly after Lt. Gen. Hussain Muhammad Ershad killed Maj. Gen. Abul Manzoor in army custody. Although it was feared that the army would seize power again, army chief Ershad pretended to be loyal to Ziaur Rahman's civilian successor, the vice-president Justice Abdus Sattar and killed many freedom fighters blaming them of the Manzoor-led coup attempt. Sattar became the presidential candidate of the BNP in the 1982 election, which he won.

== Causes ==
With the death of Ziaur Rahman, who had been an army general himself, the Bangladeshi military lost a patron and the close contact and political influence it had enjoyed with the president. Upon taking power, Sattar, a former judge without a military background, announced that the role of the military was strictly to protect the territory and borders of the country. Army chief of staff Ershad pressured the Sattar government to concede a greater role for the military in the government, threatening to seize power if its demands were not met. Sattar's position was also threatened by challenges to his leadership from various factions within the BNP and from opposition political parties such as the Awami League. In face of growing pressure, Sattar conceded the military's demand of creating a national security council with the military chiefs with the authority of overseeing the national defence and security policies. He also sacked the vice-president Mirza Nurul Hada due to pressure from Ershad. However, he tried to reaffirm his position by a relieving number of military officers of their government posts and returning them to their units. This proved to be a provocation to Ershad and the other chiefs.

== Coup ==
On March 24, 1982, troops loyal to Lt. Gen. Ershad forced the president Abdus Sattar and the vice-president to resign. Ershad imposed martial law and declared himself the chief martial law administrator. He appointed the chiefs of the navy and the air force as deputy chief martial law administrators. He also suspended fundamental civil rights and the Constitution of Bangladesh, but did not abrogate it. Three days after the coup, a Supreme Court of Bangladesh justice Abul Fazal Muhammad Ahsanuddin Chowdhury was appointed president by Ershad, who also took the title of president of the council of ministers. Ershad declared that he had undertaken the coup to save the country from the corruption and inefficiency of the BNP-led government. The Parliament of Bangladesh was dissolved and all political parties banned. Several hundred politicians were arrested on charges of corruption. In 1983, Ershad took over as president of Bangladesh.

== Seventh amendment ==
In parliamentary elections held in 1986, the Jatiyo Party, founded by Ershad earlier that year, won an absolute majority even as opposition political parties boycotted the election. Ershad used his party's majority to pass the seventh amendment to the Constitution of Bangladesh, which legitimised the 1982 coup, his ascension to power and his martial law rule. The amendment also ratified the martial law decrees and actions of the government.

In 2010, the High Court Division of the Supreme Court of Bangladesh officially struck down the seventh amendment and declared Ershad's coup and martial law rule as illegal. The verdict declared that the constitution of Bangladesh could not be subordinate to martial law, nor did it allow any temporary suspension of the constitution itself. The Supreme Court named Ershad along with Ziaur Rahman and Khondaker Mostaq Ahmad as "usurpers" of power from legitimate governments. The Supreme Court also stated that the government and parliament could decide whether or not to take action against Ershad for the illegal usurpation and pass a law to enable a trial and prevent any future usurpations.

== See also ==
- Military coups in Bangladesh

== Notes and references ==
=== References ===
- Baxter, Craig (1997). Bangladesh: From a Nation to a State. Westview Press. ISBN 978-0-8133-3632-9.
- Chowdhury, Mahfuzul H. (2003). Democratization in South Asia: lessons from American institutions. Ashgate Publishing. pp. 36–38. ISBN 978-0-7546-3423-2.
- Milam, William B. (2009). Bangladesh and Pakistan: flirting with failure in South Asia. Columbia University Press. pp. 61–100. ISBN 978-0-231-70066-5.
