= A R Mallick =

Bangladeshi historian and educationist

Azizur Rahman Mallick
- আজিজুর রহমান মল্লিক

3rd Minister of Finance and Planning
- In office 25 January 1975 – 15 August 1975
- President: Sheikh Mujibur Rahman
- Prime Minister: Muhammad Mansur Ali
- Vice President: Syed Nazrul Islam
- Preceded by: Sheikh Mujibur Rahman
- Succeeded by: Muhammad Yusuf Ali

High commissioner of Bangladesh to India
- In office 13 March 1972 – 25 January 1975
- Preceded by: Position created
- Succeeded by: Khan Shamsur Rahman

Vice Chancellor of the University of Chittagong
- In office 1966–1972
- Preceded by: Position created
- Succeeded by: M Innas Ali

Personal details
- Born: 31 December 1918 Dhaka district, Bengal Province, British India
- Died: 4 February 1997 (aged 78) Dhaka, Bangladesh
- Relatives: Sayed Farooq-ur-Rahman (nephew)
- Education: PhD (history)
- Alma mater: University of Dhaka; University of London

Azizur Rahman Mallick (31 December 1918 – 4 February 1997) was a Bangladeshi historian and educationist.

== Early life and education ==
Azizur Rahman Mallick was born in his ancestral village home in Rajapur, Dhamrai in Dhaka district in the then erstwhile Bengal Province of British India on December 31, 1918, to Ismail Mallick who was from a Zamindar family of the region. His great-grandfather Mallick Khan had migrated to Bengal from Afghanistan and had established himself as a Zamindar alongside his brother. He spent his early life in Rangoon, Burma. He and his family returned to Dhaka when he was at seventh grade. He passed SSC from Manikganj Model High School in 1934 and HSC from Dhaka College in 1936. He studied history at Dhaka University, completing bachelor's degree in 1939 and master's degree in 1940. The following year, he joined the university as a lecturer, and he had further teaching stints at Chittagong College and Rajshahi College. After World War II, he went to London, where he completed his PhD in history in 1953 from SOAS the School of Oriental and African Studies, University of London. His advisor was Dr CH Philips.

== Career ==
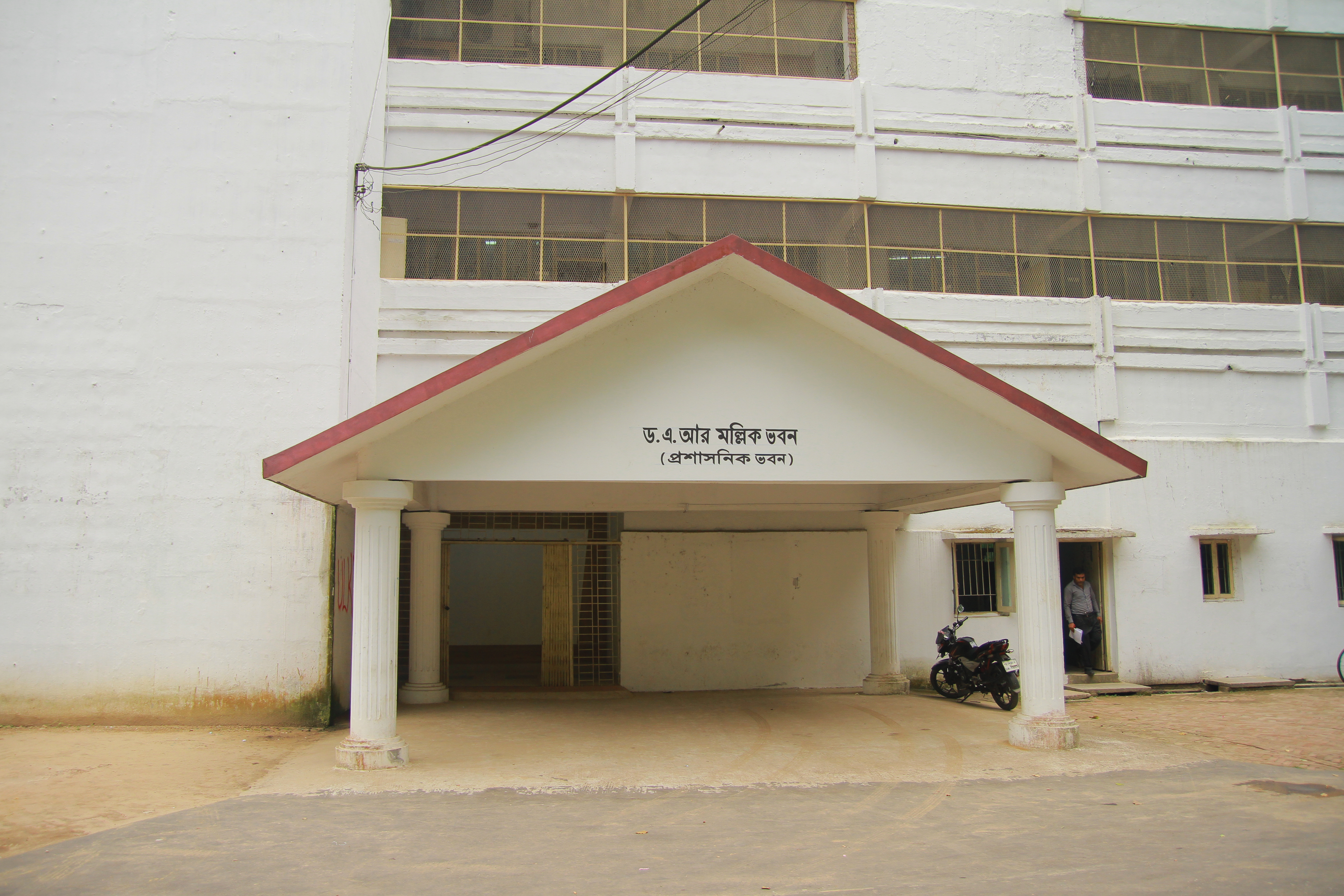
Dr. A R Mallick building, part of the administration building at the University of Chittagong

Upon returning from London, Mallick joined the history department at Rajshahi University. He eventually rose to become Dean of the Arts faculty. He also taught South Asian history at the University of Pennsylvania. He was the founding vice-chancellor of Chittagong University; the work of establishing the university was undertaken in 1964-65 and it was formally inaugurated in 1966.

Mallick was actively involved in the Bangladesh liberation movement and, after independence in 1971, held a series of important government posts. He was the first education secretary and the first ambassador to India, Nepal and Bhutan. In 1974–75, he replaced Tajuddin Ahmad as the finance minister. He joined Mostaq Ahmad cabinet immediately after assassination of Sheikh Mujibur Rahman. He took oath under the Khondaker Mostaq Ahmad leadership on August 20, 1975, and remained until the cabinet dissolved.

Mallick served as president of the Asiatic Society of Bangladesh and Bangladesh Itihas Samiti, and chairman of the Bangla Academy. His books include British Policy and the Muslims in Bengal and Amar Jibon Kotha O Bangladesher Mukti Sangram (My Life Story and the Independence Movement of Bangladesh). He died in Dhaka on 4 February 1997.
