= Shoeb Ahmed =

Former bangladeshi official

Finance Adviser of Bangladesh
- In office December 13, 2006 – January 11, 2007
- Preceded by: Dr. Akbar Ali Khan
- Succeeded by: Dr. A. B. Mirza Md. Azizul Islam

Personal details
- Born: March 1, 1948

Shoeb Ahmed (born 1 March 1948) is a retired government official of Bangladesh and former Finance Adviser, rank of government minister, under a non-partisan caretaker government from 13 December 2006 to 11 January 2007.

== Career ==
Ahmed was the secretary of the Internal Resources Division from 10 July 2001 to 9 September 2003.

Ahmed was an adviser in the President Iajuddin Ahmed led caretaker government in 2006 and was in charge of the Ministry of Finance and Commerce.

Ahmed was a witness in the 2010 trial over the 2004 arms and ammunition haul in Chittagong. He was the secretary of the Ministry of Industries when the weapons were discovered at a dock of a fertilizer plant owned by the Ministry. He implicated Matiur Rahman Nizami, Ministry of Industries, and additional secretary of the Ministry of Industries, Nurul Amin, in smuggling weapons.
