= Abdus Sattar (president) =

President of Bangladesh from 1981 to 1982

- আব্দুস সাত্তার
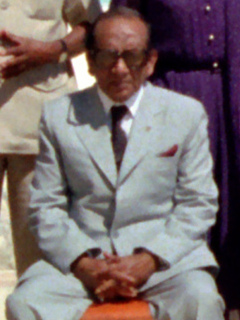
- Sattar in 1981

President of Bangladesh
- In office 30 May 1981 – 24 March 1982
- Prime Minister: Shah Azizur Rahman
- Vice President: Mirza Nurul Huda; Mohammad Mohammadullah
- Preceded by: Ziaur Rahman
- Succeeded by: A. F. M. Ahsanuddin Chowdhury

3rd Vice President of Bangladesh
- In office 21 April 1977 – 30 May 1981
- President: Ziaur Rahman
- Prime Minister: Mashiur Rahman (acting); Shah Azizur Rahman
- Preceded by: Mohammad Mohammadullah
- Succeeded by: Mirza Nurul Huda

8th Minister of Planning
- In office 27 November 1981 – 24 March 1982
- President: Himself
- Preceded by: Fasihuddin Mahtab
- Succeeded by: Abul Maal Abdul Muhith

4th Minister of Law, Justice and Parliamentary Affairs
- In office 21 January 1977 – 20 November 1981
- President: Abu Sadat Mohammad Sayem; Ziaur Rahman; Himself
- Preceded by: Abu Sadat Mohammad Sayem
- Succeeded by: Tafazzal Hossain Khan

2nd Chairman of Bangladesh Nationalist Party
- In office 30 May 1981 – 30 May 1984
- General Secretary: Nurul Islam Shishu
- Preceded by: Ziaur Rahman
- Succeeded by: Khaleda Zia

6th Interior Minister of Pakistan
- In office 9 March 1956 – 12 September 1956
- Prime Minister: Chaudhry Muhammad Ali
- Preceded by: A. K. Fazlul Huq
- Succeeded by: Mir Ghulam Ali Talpur

Constituent Assembly of Pakistan
- In office 7 July 1955 – 7 October 1958

Personal details
- Born: 1 March 1906 Birbhum, Bengal, British India
- Died: 5 October 1985 (aged 79) Dhaka, Bangladesh
- Party: Bangladesh Nationalist Party
- Education: University of Calcutta

Abdus Sattar (Note: Bengali: আবদুস সাত্তার, romanised: Abdus Sattar, pronounced [ˈabdus ˈʃatːaɾ]) (1 March 1906 – 5 October 1985) was a Bangladeshi statesman. (Note: Sources:) A leader of the Bangladesh Nationalist Party (BNP), he served as the president of Bangladesh from 1981 to 1982, and earlier as the vice president. A jurist by profession, Abdus Sattar held numerous constitutional and political offices in British India, East Pakistan and Bangladesh. He was a cabinet minister, Supreme Court judge, and chief election commissioner of Pakistan. He took oath and became president shortly after the assassination of President Ziaur Rahman.

Abdus Sattar was an elected president through a popular vote. His short lived presidency was marked by growing political turmoil and interference from the military. Abdus Sattar was overthrown in March of 1982 by the then army chief General Hussain Muhammad Ershad.

== Early life and career ==
Abdus Sattar was born in 1906 in Birbhum in the then Bengal Presidency, British India. He obtained his LLB and Master of Law from the University of Calcutta and joined the Calcutta High Court Bar in 1931 as a junior in the Chambers of A.K. Fazlul Huq. He specialised in municipal law. He became a protégé of A. K. Fazlul Huq, the first Prime Minister of Bengal. He served in various municipal bodies in Calcutta as an activist for the Krishak Praja Party. In 1950, following the Partition of British India, Abdus Sattar moved to Dacca in the Dominion of Pakistan. He joined the Dhaka High Court Bar. He was elected to the Constituent Assembly of Pakistan in 1955. He served as the Home Minister of Pakistan and Education Minister of Pakistan in the cabinet of Prime Minister Ibrahim Ismail Chundrigar in 1957. He was appointed a justice in the Dhaka High Court, which he served between 1957 and 1968. He also presided over cases in the Supreme Court of Pakistan.

In 1969, Abdus Sattar was appointed the Chief Election Commissioner of Pakistan. He organised the first general election of Pakistan in 1970, in which the Awami League gained a historic parliamentary majority to form a government. The League was denied the handover of power by the then military junta led by General Yahya Khan. As the Bangladesh Liberation War erupted with a genocide against Bengali civilians, Abdus Sattar was stranded in Islamabad, West Pakistan, removed from official positions, and interned by the Pakistani government. In 1973, Abdus Sattar returned to independent Bangladesh as part of the repatriation of stranded Bengali officials. He enjoyed rising prominence in Dhaka, but lived a quiet life with his wife and had no children.

Abdus Sattar served as chairman of the board of directors of the Bangladesh Life Insurance Corporation (1973–1974), chairman of the Journalist Wage Board (1974–1975), and chairman of the Bangladesh Institute of Law and International Affairs. In 1975, he was appointed an adviser to President Justice Abu Sadat Mohammad Sayem and vested in charge of the Ministry of Law and Parliamentary Affairs. In 1977, the new president and Chief Martial Law Administrator, Lt. General Ziaur Rahman, appointed Abdus Sattar as vice president. With the reinstatement of multiparty politics, Abdus Sattar joined the newly formed Bangladesh Nationalist Party (BNP) in 1978. Speaking of Zia, Abdus Sattar said, "He was like my son. I loved him too much. I loved him because he was trying to build this small country in a better way."

== Presidency ==
When Zia was assassinated in May 1981, a frail Vice-President Abdus Sattar was in hospital and automatically became the acting president of Bangladesh. Speaking to foreign reporters in Bangabhaban on 4 June, he announced that elections within 180 days of the death of the former president were on schedule as per the constitution, to "foil any conspiracy to disturb the democratic process in the country." A state of emergency was imposed. The election date of 21 September was pushed back to 15 November, as opposition parties demanded more time to campaign. Violence occurred when 12 army officers were executed after being convicted of complicity in Zia's killing.

As the nominee of BNP, Abdus Sattar won the presidential election in 1981, beating with a big margin his principal challenger, Kamal Hossain, from the Bangladesh Awami League. Hossain and other opposition groups alleged the polls were rigged. The emergency was lifted after the election. Abdus Sattar let Zia's controversial prime minister, Shah Azizur Rahman, continue in the top job. He appointed economist Mirza Nurul Huda as the vice president. Sattar appointed a 42-member Council of Ministers. He personally held the defence and planning portfolios. Violence against Bengalis in neighbouring Assam, India, flared during Abdus Sattar's presidency.

Abdus Sattar formed a National Security Council to explore how the Bangladesh Armed Forces could contribute to the nation's development. He was elected unopposed as president of the Bangladesh Nationalist Party in January 1982. Abdus Sattar then formed a new cabinet. Vice-President Nurul Huda resigned on 21 March 1982, claiming that he was the victim of a conspiracy within the BNP. Abdus Sattar appointed Mohammad Mohammadullah as Nurul Huda's replacement.

=== 1982 military coup ===
A bloodless coup-d'etat led by the Bangladesh Army chief Hussain Muhammad Ershad toppled Abdus Sattar's government in 1982. On the morning of 24 March, the heads of the Bangladesh Navy, the Bangladesh Air Force, the Bangladesh Rifles, and the military secretary to the president entered Bangabhaban and forced Abdus Sattar to sign a statement relinquishing power. Martial law was declared. Abdus Sattar was replaced by the retired justice A. F. M. Ahsanuddin Chowdhury.

== Pakistan Football Federation ==
Sattar served as president of the Pakistan Football Federation between 1960 and 1961.

== Death ==
Abdus Sattar died at the Suhrawardy Hospital in Dhaka on 5 October 1985, at the age of 79.
