= Mohammad Abdul Munim =

Former Minister of Finance of Bangladesh

Mohammad Abdul Munim was the minister of finance of Bangladesh in 1988 and 1990.

== Career ==
Munim retired from the Bangladesh Army as a major general. He was a close confidant of General Hussain Mohammad Ershad. In July 1983, he joined Ershad's government as the minister of public works. In February 1985, he was moved to minister of agriculture. He briefly took on the additional duties of minister of works and minister of energy and mineral resources from May 1986 to June 1986, but thereafter headed only one ministry at a time. In March 1987, he left agriculture to become minister of commerce.

In late 1987, opposition parties campaigned for democracy in an attempt to force Ershad to resign. Ershad responded by declaring a state of emergency in November and dissolving parliament on 6 December. Munim escaped an anti-government bombing uninjured on 7 December, but his car was severely damaged.

In January 1988, he moved from commerce to health and family planning, only to leave health in May to become minister of finance. In September he went back to health. In May 1989, he returned to agriculture. Finally, in March 1990 he again served as the minister of finance, where he stayed until December.
