= Vice President of Bangladesh =

Second-highest constitutional office in Bangladesh from 1971 to 1990

Vice President of the People's Republic of Bangladesh
- গণপ্রজাতন্ত্রী বাংলাদেশের উপ-রাষ্ট্রপতি
- National emblem of Bangladesh

- Flag of Bangladesh
- Style: Mr. Vice President (informal); The Honorable (formal); His Excellency (diplomatic)
- Status: Abolished
- Abbreviation: VP
- Residence: Jamuna State Guest House
- Appointer: All Members of Parliament on the advice of the President of Bangladesh
- Term length: Five years, renewable once
- Formation: 17 April 1971; 55 years ago
- First holder: Syed Nazrul Islam
- Final holder: Shahabuddin Ahmed
- Abolished: 6 December 1990 (Note: Through the 12th Amendment to the Constitution of Bangladesh in 1991)

The Vice President of Bangladesh was the second highest constitutional office in Bangladesh when the country was governed under a presidential system. The vice-president was the first person in the presidential line of succession, in the event of a president's resignation, removal or death. The post was held by several Bangladeshi statesmen during different periods of the country's history. The inaugural office holder was Syed Nazrul Islam during the Liberation War and the final office holder was Moudud Ahmed before and during '90's Mass Uprising although Chief Justice Shahabuddin Ahmed was ceremoniously appointed on demand to the office by Ershad replacing Moudud Ahmed, so that Shahabuddin could constitutionally become acting president following Ershad's resignation in 1990. Abdus Sattar was the only vice-president to succeed to the presidency in 1981.

The office was first created in the 1971 Provisional Government of Bangladesh but abolished after the war when the new constitution founded a parliamentary republic. It was however reinstated only 3 years later in 1975 through the fourth amendment to the constitution which revived the presidential system as part of founding father Sheikh Mujibur Rahman's "Second Revolution" reforms. After the 3 November coup, the post was left vacant until President Ziaur Rahman assumed a long acting presidency in 1977. Another coup in 1982 vacated the post again all through the military government of Lieutenant General Hussain Muhammad Ershad until elections in 1986. The post was finally dissolved in the 1991 interim government by acting President Shahabuddin Ahmed after a constitutional referendum put into effect the twelfth amendment, which restored the parliamentary system.

== List of officeholders ==
Political parties

- Bangladesh Awami League
- Bangladesh Krishak Sramik Awami League (BaKSAL)
- Bangladesh Nationalist Party
- Jatiya Party

Other factions

- Independent

No.	Portrait	Name (Birth–Death)	Term in office			Party	President	Notes
No.	Portrait	Name (Birth–Death)	Took office	Left office	Tenure	Party	President	Notes
1		Syed Nazrul Islam (1925–1975)	17 April 1971	12 January 1972	1 year, 91 days	Bangladesh Awami League	Sheikh Mujibur Rahman	Acting president during the Bangladesh Liberation War.
1		Syed Nazrul Islam (1925–1975)	26 January 1975	15 August 1975	1 year, 91 days	BaKSAL	Sheikh Mujibur Rahman	Acting president during the Bangladesh Liberation War.
2		Mohammad Mohammadullah (1921–1999)	15 August 1975	6 November 1975	83 days	Bangladesh Awami League	Khondaker Mostaq Ahmad	Served as Minister of Land under President Sheikh Mujib and was later appointed Vice President upon Mujib's death.
3		Abdus Sattar (1906–1985)	3 June 1977	30 May 1981	3 years, 361 days	Bangladesh Nationalist Party	Ziaur Rahman	Succeeded Zia as president in 1981.
4		Mirza Nurul Huda (1919–1991)	24 November 1981	23 March 1982	119 days	Independent	Abdus Sattar	Resigned after conflict with BNP.
5		Mohammad Mohammadullah (1921–1999)	23 March 1982	24 March 1982	1 day	Bangladesh Nationalist Party	Abdus Sattar	In office for 24 hours; deposed in the 1982 coup d'état
6		A. K. M. Nurul Islam (1919–2015)	30 November 1986	12 August 1989	2 years, 255 days	Jatiya Party	Hussain Muhammad Ershad	Former Supreme Court Justice and Law Minister.
7		Moudud Ahmed (1940–2021)	12 August 1989	5 December 1990	1 year, 115 days	Jatiya Party	Hussain Muhammad Ershad	Former Prime Minister and Deputy Prime Minister.
8		Shahabuddin Ahmed (1930–2022)	6 December 1990	6 December 1990	1 day	Independent	Hussain Muhammad Ershad	Former Chief Justice. After Ershad's resignation served as the Acting President of the Caretaker Government.
Post abolished
