= Bangladesh Institute of Development Studies =

Research institute in Bangladesh

Coordinates: 23.7790°N 90.3729°E

Bangladesh Institute of Development Studies (BIDS)
- বাংলাদেশ উন্নয়ন গবেষণা প্রতিষ্ঠান (বিআইডিএস)

Agency overview
- Formed: 1957
- Pakistan Institute of Development Economics (PIDE)
- Type: Autonomous (Public Body)
- Jurisdiction: Multi-disciplinary Social Research
- Headquarters: E-17, Agargaon, Dhaka-1207
- Employees: 140 (Posts=197)
- Adviser responsible: Wahiduddin Mahmud
- Agency executive: Dr. Binayak Sen, Director General
- Parent agency: Ministry of Planning
- Website: www.bids.org.bd

The Bangladesh Institute of Development Studies (BIDS) (Bengali: বাংলাদেশ উন্নয়ন গবেষণা প্রতিষ্ঠান (বিআইডিএস)) is an autonomous multi-disciplinary public research organization that conducts policy research on development issues for Bangladesh. Supported by the Government of Bangladesh, BIDS functions as a think tank, helping formulate socioeconomic policies. The institute conducts research and promotes study and education in development economics, rural development, demographics, and social sciences.

== History ==
The Bangladesh Institute of Development Studies had its origin in Pakistan, established in June 1957 and named the Pakistan Institute of Development Economics (PIDE). The PIDE was moved to Dhaka in January 1971. After the emergence of independent Bangladesh in 1971, the institute was called the Bangladesh Institute of Development Economics (BIDE). Later on, a Parliamentary Charter was awarded in 1974 and the institute was renamed as the Bangladesh Institute of Development Studies (BIDS) to reflect its multidisciplinary focus of development research. It was incorporated as an autonomous body, governed by a high powered Board of Trustees under the Chairmanship of the Minister of Planning, Government of the People's Republic of Bangladesh. Since 1974, through a process of national level institutional restructuring, two other institutions––the Population Study Centre and the National Foundation for Research on Human Resources Development–– were merged with BIDS in 1982 and 1983 respectively.

Initially, funding for BIDS was made through regular government budgetary support. In 1983, the Government created an endowment fund to ensure a source of recurring revenue for running the institute, thereby reducing its dependence on regular budgetary support, and enabling BIDS to enjoy more functional autonomy. In 2009, the Government provided a Research Endowment Fund of Tk. 200 million to support core institutional research of BIDS. Some donor agencies and foundations also provide resources for its activities.

== Publications ==
The Publication Section publishes books, journals, policy briefs, monographs, and other reports for promoting a wide dissemination of bids research activities and findings. The Section, with equipment to meet the institute's publishing requirements, also provides sales services to its local and foreign customers and promotes BIDS publication through complimentary and exchange programs. The BIDS publications have wide circulation amongst researchers, policymakers, and the general readers.

The Bangladesh Development Studies (BDS) is the quarterly journal of the institute. This is published in English. It enjoys international reputation and is currently in its 35th years of publication. The BDS carries research articles, notes, and book reviews by BIDS researchers as well as by national and international scholars.

The Bangladesh Unnayan Samikkhya (BUS) is published annually in Bangla. It contains articles, notes, and book reviews. It is widely read by students and researchers as well as by people of different walks of life interested in development issues.
