= Muhammad Habibur Rahman =

Bangladeshi statesman (1928–2014)

- মুহাম্মদ হাবিবুর রহমান
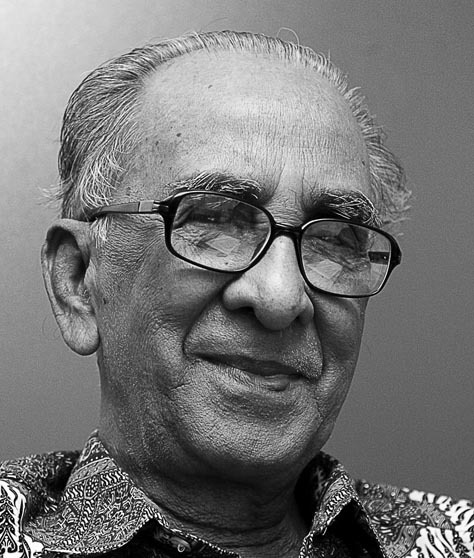
- Habibur Rahman in 2011

Chief Adviser of Bangladesh
- In office 30 March 1996 – 23 June 1996
- President: Abdur Rahman Biswas
- Preceded by: Khaleda Zia (as Prime Minister)
- Succeeded by: Sheikh Hasina (as Prime Minister)

Chief Justice of Bangladesh
- In office 1 February 1995 – 30 April 1995
- President: Abdur Rahman Biswas
- Preceded by: Shahabuddin Ahmed
- Succeeded by: A. T. M. Afzal

Personal details
- Born: 3 December 1928 Dayarampur, Bengal Presidency, British India
- Died: 11 January 2014 (aged 85) Dhaka, Bangladesh
- Party: Independent
- Education: University of Oxford
- Awards: Ekushey Padak; Bangla Academy Literary Award

Muhammad Habibur Rahman (3 December 1928 – 11 January 2014) was a Bangladeshi jurist and statesman who served as Chief Justice of Bangladesh in 1995. He was chief adviser of the 1996 caretaker government that oversaw the June 1996 Bangladeshi general election. He was a faculty member at the Department of Law, University of Rajshahi and University of Dhaka. Besides being a language activist, an advocate of the Bengali language, he wrote extensively and published eight books on the subject. He played a significant role in implementing Bengali in the Supreme Court of Bangladesh. He wrote Jathashabdo (1974), the first thesaurus in the Bengali language.

Habibur Rahman was awarded the Bangla Academy Literary Award in 1984 and the Ekushey Padak in 2007 by the government of Bangladesh. He was a Fellow of the Bangla Academy, the Asiatic Society of Bangladesh, and Worcester College, Oxford.

== Early life and education ==
Habibur Rahman was born on 3 December 1928 to a Bengali family of Muslim Bishwases in the village of Dayarampur in Jangipur subdivision, Murshidabad district, Bengal Presidency. His father, Maulavi Zahiruddin Bishwas, was a lawyer associated with the Anjuman and later the All-India Muslim League's Pakistan Movement. During the Second World War, his father was a regional leader of the National United Front and was briefly arrested in December 1947, being kept in Berhampore Prison. After the Partition of Bengal in 1947, the family eventually migrated to Nawabganj and later to Rajshahi. Habibur Rahman's mother, Gul Habiba, belonged to a Bengali Muslim family from Shyampur in Shibganj subdivision, where her son spent much of his childhood.

Habibur Rahman graduated with a Bachelor of Arts in history from the University of Dacca in 1949. He completed his Master of Arts in 1951. After that, Habibur Rahman completed a B.A. in modern history from the University of Oxford. During his student life, he was an activist in the Bengali language movement.

== Career ==
Habibur Rahman began his career as a lecturer in history at Dhaka University in 1952. Later he joined the Department of Law, University of Rajshahi, where he subsequently held the office of Dean of the Faculty of Law (1961) and of Reader in History (1962–64). He changed his profession in 1964 when he took to law and joined the Dhaka High Court Bar. In his legal career, he held the offices of assistant advocate general (1969), vice president of the High Court Bar Association (1972), and member of the Bangladesh Bar Council (1972).

== Literature ==
Habibur Rahman was an author of seventy books in Bengali on law, language, literature, poetry, and religion and five books in English, including two books of verse. Law of Requisition (1966), Rabindra Prabandhey Sanjna O Parthakya Bichar (1968), Jatha-sabda (1974), Matri-bhashar Sapakshey Rabindranath (1983), Qur'an-sutra (1984), Bachan O Prabachan (1985), Gangariddhi thekey Bangladesh (1985), Rabindra Rachanar Rabindra-byaksha (1986), Rabindra-kabyey Art, Sangeet O Sahitya (1986), Koran-shorif Sorol Banganubad, On Rights and Remedies, Amara ki Jabo-na Tader Kachhey Jara Shudhu Banglai Katha Baley (1996).

== Legacy ==
Habibur Rahman made notable contributions to the Language Movement, 21 February 1952 in the then East Pakistan. He was the first person to break Section 144, led the first batch of a procession, and was arrested soon after that. On that day, the police and parliamentary forces resorted to widespread tear gas shelling, beating, and finally shooting. Consequently, several students were killed, hundreds were injured, and thousands were arrested.

== Death ==
On 11 January 2014, at the age of 85, Habibur Rahman died at United Hospital, Gulshan, Dhaka.
