= Akbar Ali Khan (economist) =

Bangladeshi economist and educationist (1944–2022)

- আকবর আলি খান
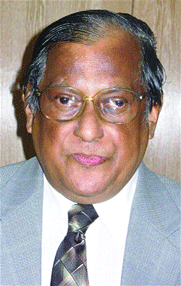

Adviser for Finance, Commerce, Posts and Telecommunications
- In office 26 October 2006 – 11 January 2007
- President: Iajuddin Ahmed
- Preceded by: Hafizuddin Ahmed; Saifur Rahman; Aminul Haque
- Succeeded by: A. B. Mirza Azizul Islam

Personal details
- Pronunciation: [akbɔɾ ali kʰan]
- Born: 1944 Brahmanbaria, Bengal Presidency, British India
- Died: 8 September 2022 (aged 77–78) Dhaka, Bangladesh
- Relatives: A. K. N. Ahmed (cousin)
- Education: PhD
- Alma mater: University of Dhaka; Queen's University
- Occupation: Economist

Akbar Ali Khan (Note: Bengali: আকবর আলি খান, Bengali pronunciation: [akbɔɾ ali kʰan].) (Bengali: আকবর আলি খান, pronounced [akbɔɾ ali kʰan]; 1944 – 8 September 2022) was a Bangladeshi economist and educationist who served as a bureaucrat until 2001. He was a sub-divisional officer of Habiganj during the Bangladesh Liberation War when he decided to join the war. Later, he served as an official of the Mujibnagar Government. After independence, he rejoined the civil service and reached the highest post of Cabinet Secretary. In the meanwhile, he also worked as a university teacher. Towards the end of 2006, he became one of the advisers of the Caretaker Government led by President Iajuddin Ahmed. In October 2007, the Government of Bangladesh constituted a Regulatory Reforms Commission (RRC) with him as the chair.

== Early life and education ==
Khan was born in Nabinagar, Brahmanbaria, a sub-division of the-then Comilla district. He attended Nabinagar Pilot High School. He passed I.Sc. from Dhaka College in 1961. He then studied history at the University of Dhaka and completed his bachelor's and master's from there in 1964 and 1965 respectively, with first class, topping the list on both the occasions. Before joining the then Civil Services of Pakistan he served as a teacher in BUET for some time. After a foundation course at the Civil Service Academy in Lahore (1967–68), he was posted as the sub-divisional officer (SDO) of now defunct sub-district Habiganj in 1969. His uncle, Yakub Ali Khan, was a government high official. A. K. N. Ahmed, the second governor of Bangladesh Bank, was his cousin.

== Career ==
=== During Bangladesh liberation war ===
Khan actively participated in the civil disobedience movement in March 1971 before the commencement of the war of liberation on 25 March 1971. When the war began, he decided to supply ammunition to the guerrilla fighters, yet in the capacity of the SDO of Habiganj. As the Mujibnagar government was yet to be formed and war of liberation remained to be formally launched, many police officers disagreed to give arms and ammunition without a written order. Khan fearlessly gave written note ordering to provide the freedom fighters with food and money. Collecting from the sub-divisional treasury, he arranged to send nearly three Crore taka to Agartala by a truck to help run the Bangladesh Government to be formed on 17 April 1971. Later he left Bangladesh, the then East Pakistan, and moved to Agartala, India across the border to physically participate in the war of liberation. He said, "After reaching Agartala we focused on building up an 'eastern administration'. Our main aim was to support the freedom fighters and to help the refugees who had escaped Bangladesh and lived in camps. We established a connection with the Mujibnagar Government after a few months of its formation on 17 April 1971. During the initial months, we had to struggle single-handedly". In July, he was asked to come to Kolkata (Calcutta) to join the government. There he began working at the Cabinet division as a deputy secretary. Later, in August, he was transferred to the Defense Ministry. He was sentenced to 14 years of rigorous imprisonment in absentia by a Pakistan military court for his active participation in the liberation war of Bangladesh.

=== After 1971 ===
After the independence of Bangladesh in the December 1971, Khan was appointed in the Establishment Ministry of the government of Bangladesh. He worked there for six months and helped in the rehabilitation of the freedom fighters and also people who came back from Pakistan. From there he was transferred to the Education Ministry. In 1973 he decided to retire to take up teaching again as the profession. Although he submitted his resignation, Sheikh Mujibur Rahman, the then prime minister of the country, did not accept it. Instead, he was granted leave of absence with a lien to teach in a university. He taught at the Jahangirnagar University until receiving the Commonwealth Scholarship to pursue higher education. He studied at the Queen's University, Canada for PhD in economics. Upon his return to Bangladesh in 1979, he was shortly promoted to associate professor of the Jahangirnagar University. However, eventually, he left teaching and returned to Bangladesh Civil Service.

In 1984, Khan joined the Bangladesh Public Administration Training Centre (BPATC) as a member of the directing staff (MDS). Thereafter, until 1987, he worked at the Rural Development Board, in the Water Resource Ministry and in the Bangladesh Public Service Commission. Later he was appointed in the Bangladesh Embassy in Washington, D.C. as its economic minister.

After completion of his tenure in Washington, Khan returned home and joined the Banking Division of the Ministry of Finance as an Additional Secretary. During the period he re-organized BCCI Bank and took over BASIC Bank.

Khan worked in the Environmental Ministry before his promotion as a permanent secretary to the government in 1993. In the capacity of Secretary, Internal Resources Division, he worked as the Chairman of the National Board of Revenue until 1995. Between 1995 and 2001, he worked as the Finance Secretary of the country. As the finance secretary, he opposed the purchase of BNS Bangabandhu due to financial condition of Bangladesh. He was overruled by Prime Minister Sheikh Hasina. As he retired, government chose to nominate him as Alternative Executive Director of the World Bank, Washington where he served until 2005.

Khan resigned along with three other advisers, Hasan Mashhud Chowdhury, C M Shafi Sami and Sultana Kamal on the grounds of dissatisfaction with President Ahmed caretaker government. According to them, there was no scope to contribute in the caretaker government to create a congenial atmosphere for holding a free and fair election.

=== University of Dhaka scandals ===
During the period of Sheikh Mujibur Rahman's Prime Ministership, a scandal arose in the University of Dhaka teachers about being Rajakar or not. As the Prime Minister asked the Education Minister to make an inquiry into the matter, he handed it over to Khan. Khan was apprehensive about this investigation as the law rejects the investigation which was not enough to cover it. So he filed an investigation as he was ordered and provided a note mentioning about his opposing points. Perusing his note of dissent, President Abu Sayeed Chowdhury asked the Education Minister to convince Prime Minister about Khan's points. In this connection, Khan said, "Every time I did not like or felt something that was against the law, I gave written notes, and in most cases, my experience is saying it was bound to be accepted".

== Last activities ==
Retiring from World Bank, Khan established Centre for Government Studies at the BRAC University. He worked there as a visiting professor. He became a public face as he appeared in different television talk shows to explain the current political and economic situation of the country. Besides, he did research on the historic and economic process of the country. On 30 October 2007, he was appointed the chairman of the Regulatory Reform Commission to modernise old and ineffective laws of the country. However, he resigned from the post of Chairman of Regulatory Reforms Commission on 16 October 2009 citing the cause that the government is not co-operating with the work of the commission. Khan served as a trusty board member of Transparency International Bangladesh since 2013.

On 8 September 2022, Khan became ill and died en route to Evercare Hospital Dhaka. He was declared dead by the medical officers.

== Bibliography ==
- Abak Bangladesh Bichitra Chhalanajale Rajneeti
- Pararthaparatar Arthaneeti, In this book, he expressed the complex aspects of economic phenomenon in the lucid, unorthodox style of John Kenneth Galbraith.
- Ajab O Jabar-Ajab Arthaneeti
- Gresham's Law Syndrome And Beyond
- Friendly Fires, Humpty Dumpty Disorder, and Other Essays: Reflections on Economy and Governance in Bangladesh
- Discovery of Bangladesh - Explorations into Dynamics of a Hidden Nation
- Bangladesher Sattar Anwesha
- Chabikathir Khonje: Natun Aloke Jibananander 'Banalata Sen'
- Andhakarer Utsa Hate: Sahitya, Samaj, Paribesh O Arthaneeti Samparke Alor Sandhan
- History of Bangladesh, Asiatic Society of Bangladesh published this book where he explored the historical and social emergencies of Bangladesh as well as the growth of Islam in the country.
