= A. F. M. Ahsanuddin Chowdhury =

President of Bangladesh from 1982 to 1983

- আ ফ ম আহসানউদ্দিন চৌধুরী

President of Bangladesh
- In office 27 March 1982 – 10 December 1983
- Preceded by: Abdus Sattar
- Succeeded by: Hussain Muhammad Ershad

Personal details
- Born: Abul Fazal Mohammad Ahsanuddin Chowdhury; 1 July 1915 Mymensingh District, Bengal, British India
- Died: 30 August 2001 (aged 86) Dhaka, Bangladesh
- Party: Jatiya Party
- Education: University of Dhaka

Abul Fazal Mohammad Ahsanuddin Chowdhury (Note: Bengali: আ ফ ম আহসানুদ্দিন চৌধুরী [ˈabul fɔʒɔl moɦɑmmɔd aɦsɑnudːin ˈtʃoʊd̪ʊɾi]) (1 July 1915 – 30 August 2001) was a Bengali public servant and judge who served as president of Bangladesh from 27 March 1982 to 10 December 1983.

== Biography ==
Chowdhury was born on 1 July 1915 in Gouripur, Mymensingh District, Bengal Presidency (now Bangladesh). He attended the University of Dhaka.

=== Career ===
He joined the Bengal Civil Service in 1942, and subsequently served as a regional district judge. He was appointed Justice of the Dhaka High Court on 17 December 1968 by the then President of Pakistan, Field Marshal Ayub Khan, and later a Justice of the Appellate Division of the Supreme Court on 30 January 1974. He retired from service on 1 July 1977 after President Ziaur Rahman reduced the retirement age of judges from 65 to 62.

Following a military coup d'état in March 1982, the army chief of staff Hossain Mohammad Ershad assumed power as the chief martial law administrator, and Chowdhury was made the President of Bangladesh on 27 March 1982, a position which he held till 10 December 1983. Ershad then dismissed Chowdhury and assumed the presidency for himself.

Chowdhury was the chairman of Bangladesh Scouts, chairman of the management board and trustee board of Dhaka Child Hospital, chairman of National Foundation of Mental Health, chairman of the managing committee of Dhaka Law College, chairman of Anjuman Mufidul Islam, and chairman of Dhaka High Court mazar committee.

=== Death ===
Chowdhury died on 30 August 2001 in Dhaka, Bangladesh.

== See also ==
Political offices
Preceded by Abdus Sattar	President of Bangladesh; 1982–1983	Succeeded by Hussain Muhammad Ershad
