= Ministry of Law, Justice and Parliamentary Affairs =

Government ministry of Bangladesh

- আইন, বিচার ও সংসদ বিষয়ক মন্ত্রণালয়
- Government Seal of Bangladesh

Ministry overview
- Formed: 12 January 1972; 54 years ago
- Jurisdiction: Government of Bangladesh
- Headquarters: Bangladesh Secretariat, Dhaka
- Annual budget: ৳2236.58 crore (US$180 million) (2026-2027)
- Minister responsible: Md. Asaduzzaman
- Ministry executives: Md. Golam Sarwar, Secretary (In Charge), Law and Justice Division; Md. Mainul Kabir, Secretary (In Charge), Legislative and Parliamentary Affairs Division
- Child agencies: Law and Justice Division; Legislative and Parliamentary Affairs Division
- Website: minlaw.gov.bd

Ministry of Law, Justice and Parliamentary Affairs (Bengali: আইন, বিচার ও সংসদ বিষয়ক মন্ত্রণালয়; Ā'ina, bicāra ō sansada biṣaẏaka mantraṇālaẏa) is a ministry of the Government of Bangladesh responsible for managing legal affairs, legislative activities, and matters relating to the Parliament of Bangladesh. It also oversees the administration of justice through its two divisions: the Law and Justice Division and the Legislative and Parliamentary Affairs Division.

== History ==
Ministry of Law, Justice and Parliamentary Affairs was established in 1971.

== Officeholders ==
Caretaker Adviser

Portrait	Minister (Birth-Death) Constituency	Term of office			Political party	Ministry	Prime Minister				
Portrait	Minister (Birth-Death) Constituency	From	To	Period	Political party	Ministry	Prime Minister				
	Khondaker Mostaq Ahmad খন্দকার মোশতাক আহমেদ (1918–1996)	10 April 1971	12 January 1972	277 days	Awami League	Mujib I		Tajuddin Ahmad			
	Kamal Hossain কামাল হোসেন (born 1937)	12 January 1972	16 March 1973	1 year, 63 days	Awami League	Mujib I		Tajuddin Ahmad	Awami League	Mujib II	Sheikh Mujibur Rahman
	Manoranjan Dhar মনোরঞ্জন ধার (1904–2000)	16 March 1973	15 August 1975	2 years, 152 days	Awami League	Awami League		Mujib III	Sheikh Mujibur Rahman		
Mujib IV	Muhammad Mansur Ali				Awami League				Sheikh Mujibur Rahman		
	Khandaker Abu Bakr	11 December 1983	1 June 1984	173 days	Awami League	Bangladesh Jatiya Party	Ershad	Hussain Muhammad Ershad			
	Ataur Rahman Khan আতাউর রহমান খান (1905–1991)	1 June 1984	19 January 1985	232 days	Awami League	Bangladesh Jatiya Party	Ershad	Ataur Rahman Khan			
	AR Yusuf	19 January 1985	17 February 1985	29 days		Bangladesh Jatiya Party					
	A. K. M. Nurul Islam	17 February 1985	27 March 1988	4 years, 176 days	Mizanur Rahman Chowdhury	Bangladesh Jatiya Party					
Moudud Ahmed						Bangladesh Jatiya Party					
	Moudud Ahmed মওদুদ আহমেদ (1940–2021)	12 August 1989	2 May 1990	Kazi Zafar Ahmed		Bangladesh Jatiya Party					
	Habibul Islam Bhuiyan	2 May 1990	6 December 1990								

== Directorates ==
=== Law and Justice Division ===
- Bangladesh Supreme Court
- Bangladesh Law Commission
- Bangladesh Judicial Service Commission
- National Legal Aid Services Organization
- Directorate of Registration

=== Legislative and Parliamentary Affairs Division ===
- Bangladesh Law Commission
- Bangladesh National Human Rights Commission
- The Attorney General's Office

== See also ==
- Justice ministry
- Politics of Bangladesh
