= Waliul Islam =

Waliul Islam is a retired secretary and the chairman of the board of trustees of Gono Bishwabidyalay. He is the chairperson of Social Marketing Company. He is a former director of Dhaka Stock Exchange. He was the secretary of the Ministry of Shipping.

Islam was the secretary of the Statistics and Informatics Division of the Ministry of Planning. He contributed to the Bangladesh Liberation War while serving as the Sub Divisional Officer (SDO) of Magura District.

== Career ==
Islam joined the Central Superior Services of Pakistan in 1967. He had welcomed Ziauddin M. Choudhury to the civil service who had arrived to Jessore as an apprentice. During the Bangladesh Liberation War, he served as the Sub Divisional Officer (SDO) of Magura District. He contributed to the war with other civil servants such as Tawfiq-e-Elahi Chowdhury who wrote an account of that time in his book Chariot of Life. He was appointed Deputy Commissioner of Jessore District in December 1971.

Islam had served as the Secretary of the Ministry of Communication, Ministry of Shipping, and the Statistics and Informatics Division. He was the Director General of the Bangladesh Bureau of Statistics.

Islam chaired the first meeting of the Greater Noakhali Officers’ Forum 13 December 1996 at the BCS Administration Academy and attended by A. B. M. Abdus Sakur, A. S. M. Shahjahan, and Md. Faiz Ullah. On 4 January 2000, he attended the opening ceremony of Victory '71 monument in Jessore along with Ali Reza Raju, Pijush Kanti Bhattacharjee, and Khan Tipu Sultan.

In 2005, Islam was the Health Management & Financing Advisor of the NGO Service Delivery Project.

Islam was appointed an independent director of Dhaka Stock Exchange in 2014 under Justice Siddiqur Rahman. He retired from the Dhaka Stock Exchange in February 2020.

On 7 September 2021, Islam was electecd chairman of the board of Social Marketing Company. He was a member of the trustee board of Gono Bishwabidyalay. In May 2024, Islam was fined 1.6 million BDT by Judge Alauddin Akbar for SMC selling electrolyte drink without authorization from the Bangladesh Standards and Testing Institution. He also secured bail in the case which was filed by Kamrul Hasan, inspector of Bangladesh Food Safety Authority.

Islam was elected chairman of the board of trustees of Gono Bishwabidyalay on 31 August 2024. He replaced Dr. Serajul Islam Choudhury.
