= Gono Bishwabidyalay =

Private university in Bangladesh

- গণ বিশ্ববিদ্যালয়
- Other name: Gono Bishwabidyalay
- Motto: A University with a difference
- Type: Private
- Established: 14 July 1998; 28 years ago
- Affiliations: UGC
- Chairman: Zafrullah Chowdhury (founding chairman)
- Chancellor: President Mirza Fakhrul Islam Alamgir
- Vice-Chancellor: Professor Dr. Md. Abul Hossain
- Students: More than 5000
- Location: Nolam, Mirzanagar, Savar, Dhaka-1344, Bangladesh; 23.9287°N 90.2447°E
- Campus: Rural, 32 acres
- Colors: Blue, Gray and Green
- Website: www.gonouniversity.edu.bd

University rankings

Regional – Overall
- QS Asia: 1301-1400 (2026)

Gono Bishwabidyalay (Bengali: গণ বিশ্ববিদ্যালয় lit. 'People's University', abbreviated as GB) is a private university in Savar, Bangladesh which was established on 14 July 1994 as the People's University. It is now operating their academic and administrating activity on their permanent campus at Nolam, Savar, Dhaka. It was approved by University Grants Commission (UGC) on 1998. Professor Dr. Md. Abul Hossain is the vice-chancellor of the university.

== History ==
Gono University was founded by the non profit Gonoshasthaya Kendra in 1994.

In December 2013, students of Gono University and its sister medical university, Gonoshasthaya Samaj Vittik Medical College, vandalized their own university and hospital over the death of a doctor of the institute in remote area of Patuakhali. Gonoshasthaya Kendra requires the students and doctors to work in 46 health care centres located in remote rural parts of Bangladesh.

University Grant Commission identified Gono University as one of a number of universities with vice-chancellors in September 2015 report; the last vice-chancellor recently finished his tenure. On 12 September 2015, students of Gono University blocked Dhaka-Aricha highway protesting the government decision to impose vat on private university tuitions.

Students of Gono University got into scuffles with protestors outside PHA building of the Gonoshasthaya Kendra in 2018. The protestors were laid by plaintiffs of cases against the founder of Gonoshasthaya Kendra, Zafrullah Chowdhury, who alleged the building was built on land that belonged to Cotton Textile Craft Limited.

In December 2017, students of Gono University protested in Savar demanding University Grants Commission recognize BBA program of the university.

The University Grant Commission issued a warning against students joining Gono University over management irregularities at the university in 2019.

On 13 September 2020, the registrar of Gono University was fired for sexual harassment.

Bijon Kumar Sil, lead virologist at Gono University, developed a low cost COVID-19 test kit during the COVID-19 pandemic in Bangladesh. It failed to secure approval from the government of Bangladesh and Sil, a citizen of Singapore, was forced to leave Bangladesh after failing to get a renewed work permit.

== Vice-chancellor ==
- Md. Abul Hossain

== Trustee Board ==
Name	Designation	Reference
Serajul Islam Choudhury	Chairman	
Amirul Islam Choudhury	Trustee	
Altafunnesa	Trustee	
Kazi Fazlur Rahman	Trustee	
Dilara Choudhury	Trustee	
Waliul Islam	Trustee	
Salahuddin Ahmed	Trustee	
Zafrullah Chowdhury	Trustee	
Tahrunnesa Abdullah	Trustee	
Syed Modasser Ali	Trustee	
Abdur Rouf	Trustee	
Hosne Ara Shahed	Trustee	
Abul Qasem Chowdhury	Trustee	
Shirin Parvin Huq	Trustee	
Md. Nazrul Islam (Asif Nazrul)	Trustee	
Farida Akhter	Trustee	

== Photo Gallery ==
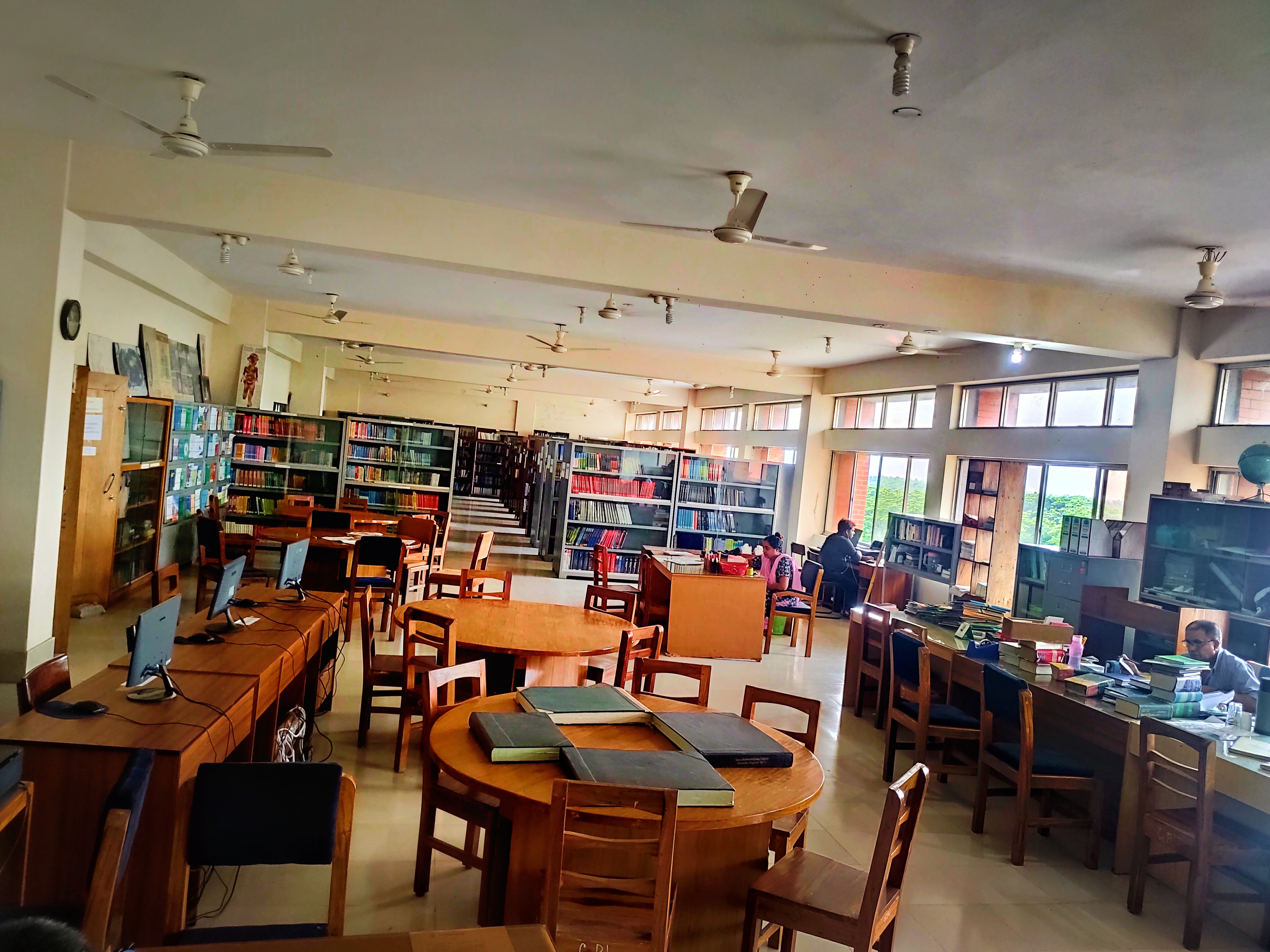
Library

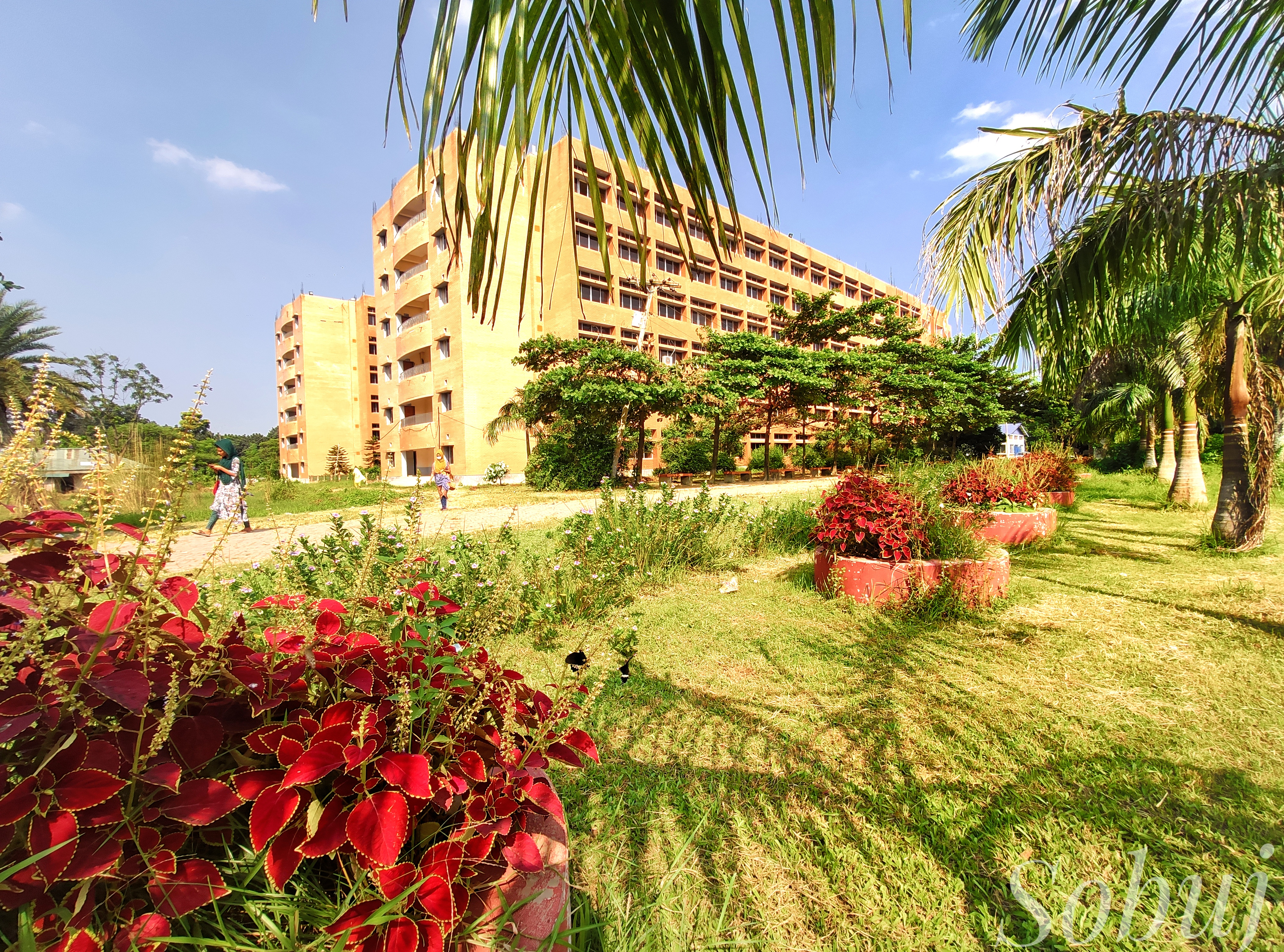
campus

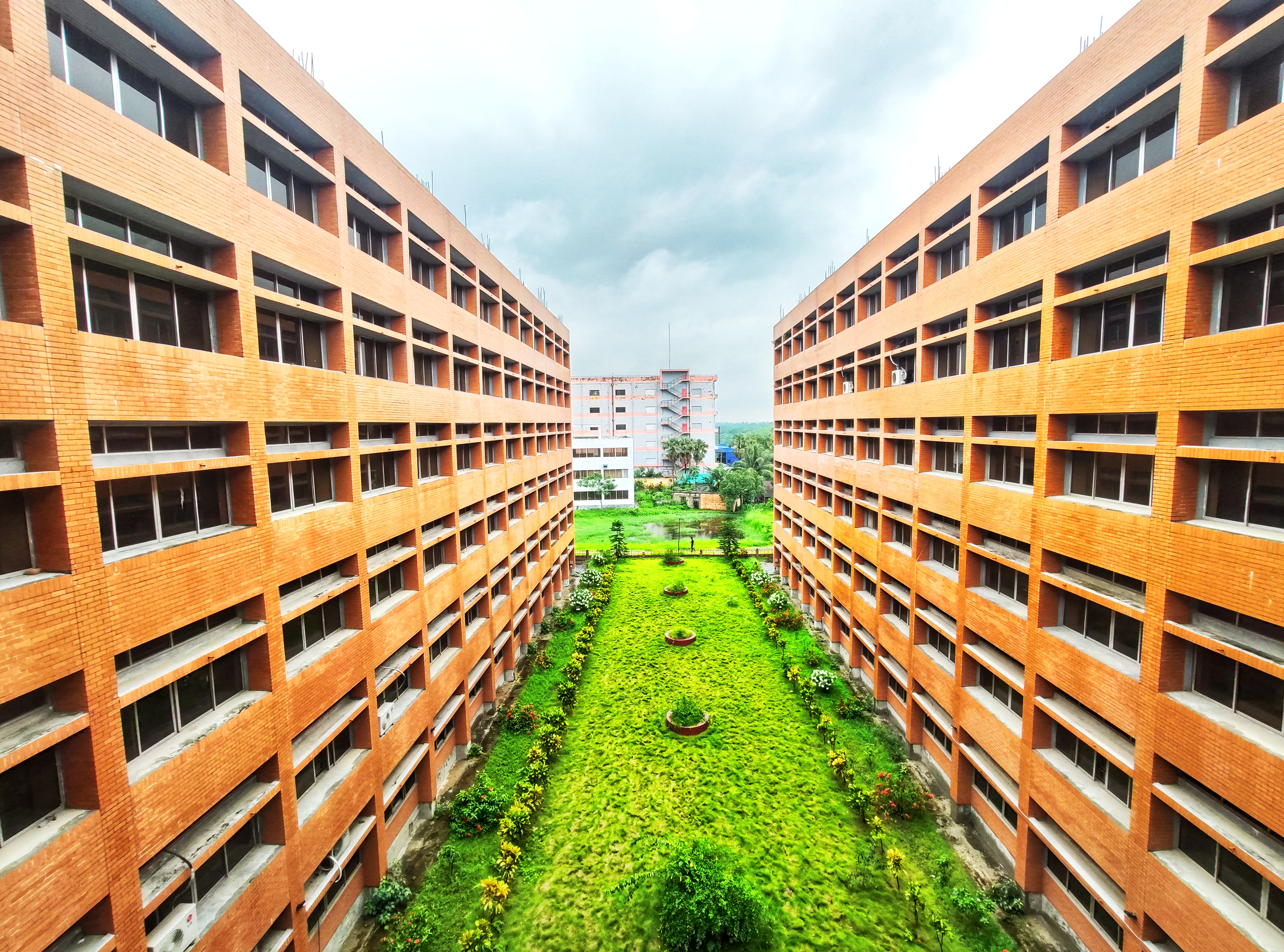
Academic Building

== Faculties ==
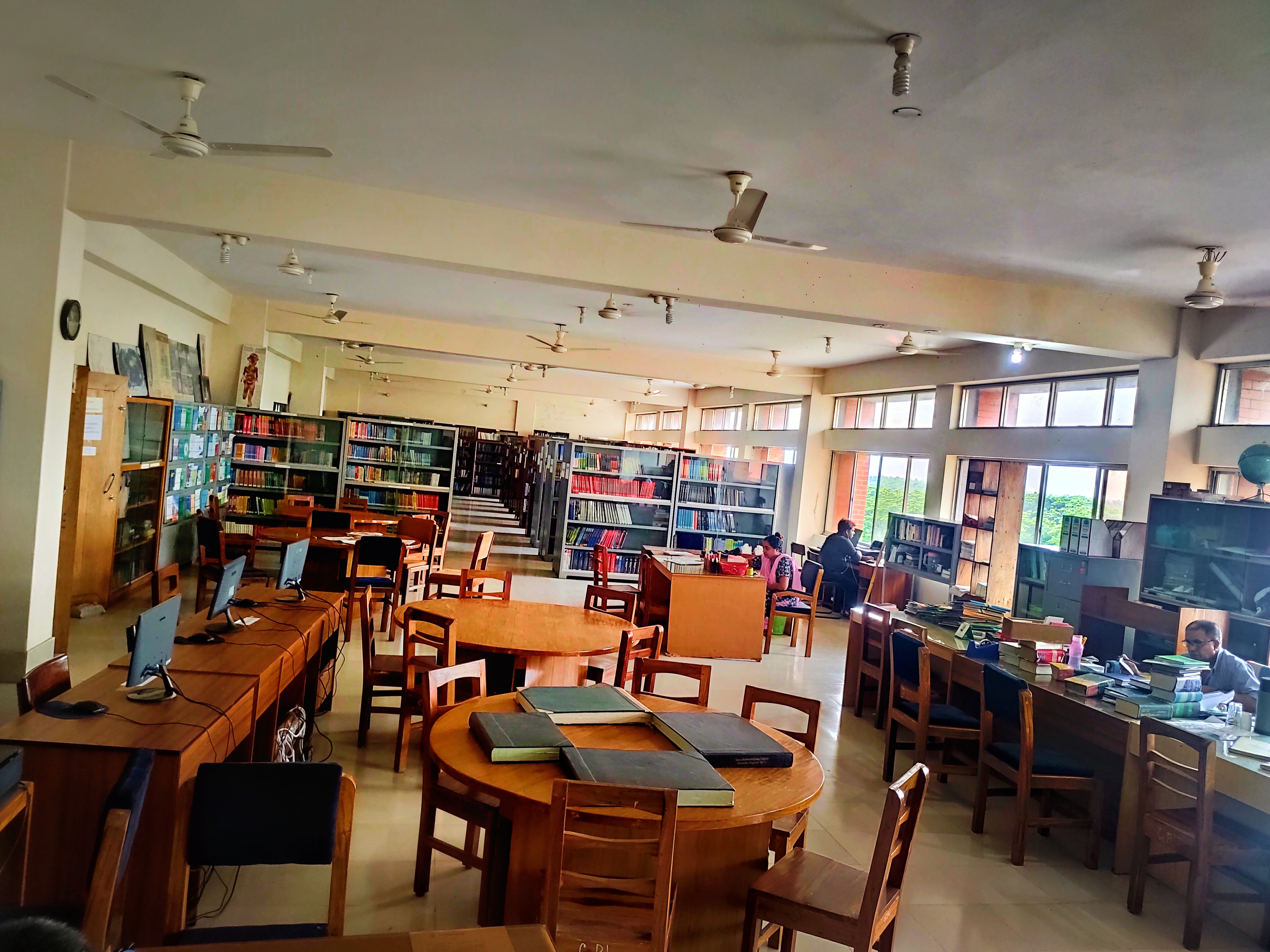

- Faculty of Health Sciences
- Faculty of Arts & Social Sciences
- Faculty of Science & Engineering
- Faculty of Veterinary and Animal sciences
- Faculty of Postgraduate Studies
- Faculty of Agriculture
