= 1991 Bangladeshi census =

1991 Bangladesh census
- 1991

General information
- Country: Bangladesh
- Authority: Bangladesh Bureau of Statistics

Results
- Total population: 106,314,992

Religion in Bangladesh (1991 Census)
1. Islam (88.3%)
2. Hinduism (10.5%)
3. Buddhism (0.58%)
4. Christianity (0.33%)
5. Others (0.26%)

In 1991, the Bangladesh Bureau of Statistics, conducted a national census in Bangladesh. They recorded data from all of the districts and upazilas and main cities in Bangladesh including statistical data on population size, households, sex and age distribution, marital status, economically active population, literacy and educational attainment, religion, number of children etc. According to the census, Hindus were 10.5 per cent of the population, down from 12.1 per cent as of 1981.

Bangladesh had a population of 106,314,992 as per the 1991 national census report. As many as 93,886,769 reported that they were Muslims, 11,184,337 reported as Hindus, 616,626 as Buddhists, 350,839 as Christians and 276,418 as others.

== See also ==
- Demographics of Bangladesh
- 2001 Census of Bangladesh
- 2011 Census of Bangladesh
- 2022 Census of Bangladesh
