= 2011 Bangladeshi census =

National Census

2011 Bangladesh census
- 2011

General information
- Country: Bangladesh
- Authority: Bangladesh Bureau of Statistics

Results
- Total population: 142,319,000

Religion in Bangladesh (2011 Census)
1. Islam (90.4%)
2. Hinduism (8.54%)
3. Buddhism (0.60%)
4. Christianity (0.37%)
5. Others (0.14%)

In 2011, the Bangladesh Bureau of Statistics conducted a national census in Bangladesh, which provided a provisional estimate of the total population of the country as 142,319,000. The previous decennial census was the 2001 census. Data were recorded from all of the districts and upazilas and main cities in Bangladesh, including statistical data on population size, households, sex and age distribution, marital status, economically active population, literacy and educational attainment, religion, number of children etc. Bangladesh and India also conducted their first joint census of areas along their border in 2011. According to the census, Hindus constituted 8.5 per cent of the population as of 2011, down from 9.6 per cent in the 2001 census.

Bangladesh had a population of 144,043,697 as per the 2011 census report. The majority of 130,201,097 reported that they were Muslim, 12,301,331 reported as Hindu, 864,262 as Buddhist, 532,961 as Christian and 201,661 as others.

== See also ==
- Demographics of Bangladesh
- 1991 Census of Bangladesh
- 2001 Census of Bangladesh
- 2022 Census of Bangladesh
