= 2001 Bangladeshi census =

2001 census of Bangladesh

2001 Bangladesh census
- 23–27 January 2001

General information
- Country: Bangladesh
- Authority: Bangladesh Bureau of Statistics

Results
- Total population: 129.3 million

Religion in Bangladesh (2001 Census)
1. Islam (89.6%)
2. Hinduism (9.34%)
3. Buddhism (0.62%)
4. Christianity (0.31%)
5. Others (0.15%)

In 2001, the Bangladesh Bureau of Statistics conducted a national census in Bangladesh, ten years after the 1991 census. They recorded data from all of the districts, upazilas, and main cities in Bangladesh including statistical data on population size, households, sex and age distribution, marital status, economically active population, literacy and educational attainment, religion, number of children, etc. According to the adjusted 2001 census figures, Bangladesh's population stood at 129.3 million (an initial count put it at 124.4 million; an adjustment for the standard rate of undercounting then boosted the figure). According to the census, Hindus were 9.2 per cent of the population, down from 10.5 per cent as of 1991.

The census data were collected from January 23 to 27, 2001. The 2001 census was the first in Bangladesh to use optical mark recognition (OMR) technology.

Bangladesh had a population of 124,355,263 as per the 2001 census report. As many as 111,397,444 reported that they were Muslims, 11,614,781 reported as Hindus, 771,002 as Buddhists, 385,501 as Christians and 186,532 as others.

== See also ==
- Demographics of Bangladesh
- 1991 Census of Bangladesh
- 2011 Census of Bangladesh
- 2022 Census of Bangladesh
