= Shireen Huq =

Bangladeshi women's rights activist

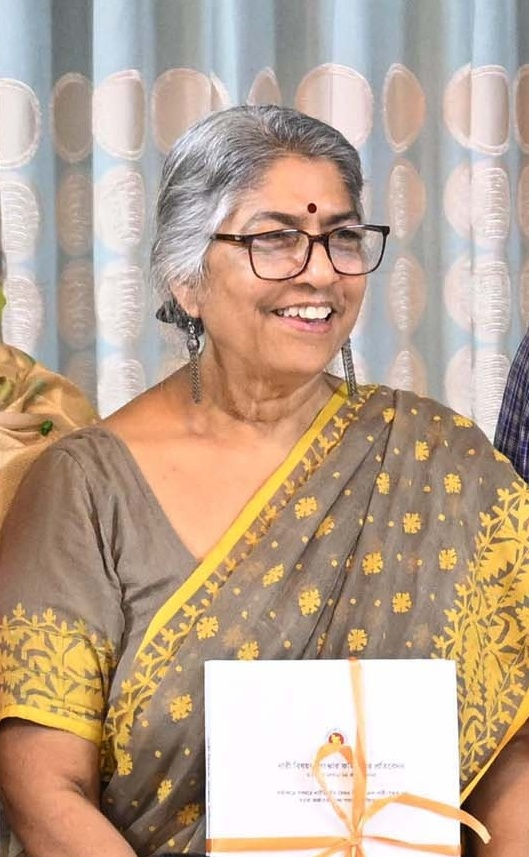
- Huq in April 2025
- Spouses: Zafrullah Chowdhury
- Children: Bareesh, Bristi
- Relatives: Nasreen Pervin Huq (sister)

Shireen Huq, also known as Shireen Pervin Huq, is a women's rights activist, and founder of Naripokkho, a woman's rights organization. She is a trustee board member of Gono Bishwabidyalay. She is the co-convener of Bangladesh Civil Society Platform on Justice and Accountability for the Rohingyas.

== Career ==
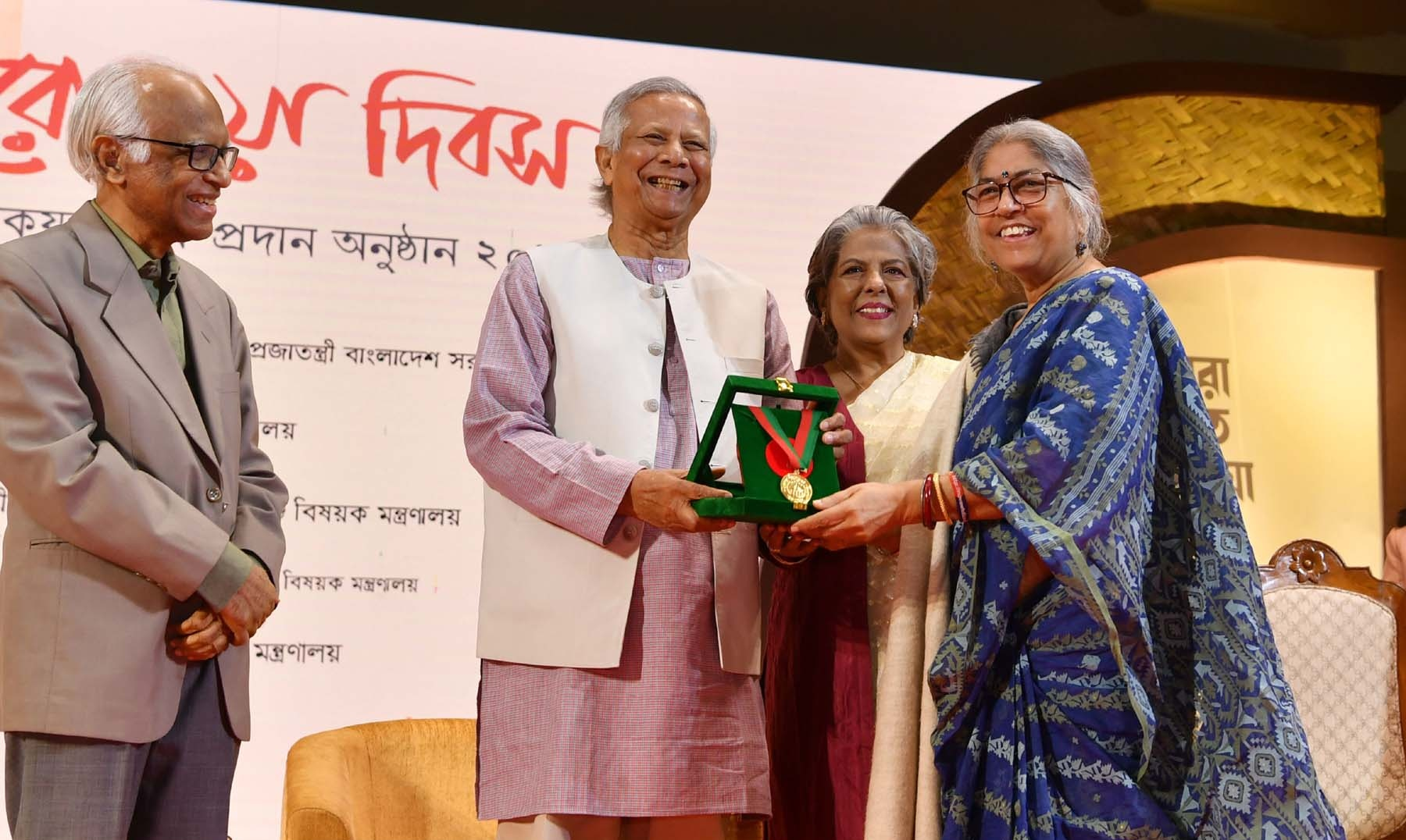
Huq receiving 2024 Begum Rokeya Padak

Huq was one of the founding members of Naripokkho in 1983. She worked for Danish International Development Agency from 1987 to 2006.

Huq signed a letter with 57 other women leaders calling on the government to not interfere with Grameen Bank in August 2012.

In August 2013, Huq called for the government to release Adilur Rahman Khan.

Huq spoked against the short imprisonment of David Bergman for contempt of court in 2015. She is a founding member of the Committee for the Protection of Fundamental Rights. She called Rezaul Karim Bablu, member of parliament, a Neanderthal for his comments blaming feminist of rape.

In 2023, Huq signed a letter criticizing the government treatment of former prime minister Khaleda Zia, warning it could lead to a political crises, and asking the government to send her abroad for treatment. Other signatories included Ali Imam Majumder, Asif Nazrul, CR Abrar, Farida Akhtar, Hafizuddin Khan, Naila Z Khan, Nur Khan, Rahnuma Ahmed, Shahdeen Malik, Shahidul Alam, Sharmeen Murshid, Syeda Rizwana Hasan, and Tofail Ahmed.

In February 2024, Huq met with Rear Adm. Eileen Laubacher, special assistant to the president and senior director for South Asia - national security, Afreen Akhter, state department deputy assistant secretary, and Michael Schiffer, assistant administrator of the bureau for Asia, at the United States embassy to discuss democracy and human rights. The meeting was attended by Adilur Rahman Khan, Debapriya Bhattacharya, and Zillur Rahman, host of Tritiyo Matra. After the fall of the Sheikh Hasina led Awami League government, Huq visited the headquarters of Directorate General of Forces Intelligence to inspect the secret detention facility Aynaghor. She was appointed the chair of the Women Affairs Reform Commission formed by the Muhammad Yunus led Interim government.

== Personal life ==
Huq was married to Zafrullah Chowdhury (d. 2023), founder of Gonoshasthaya Kendra. They have a son, Bareesh Chowdhury, and a daughter, Bristi Chowdhury. Her sister, Nasreen Pervin Huq, died in a car accident.
