= 2022 Bangladeshi census =

National census

2022 Bangladesh census
- June 15, 2022 – June 21, 2022
- Bangladesh Bureau of Statistics' visual identifier for its 2022 Population and Housing Census

General information
- Country: Bangladesh
- Authority: Bangladesh Bureau of Statistics
- Website: bbs.gov.bd

Results
- Total population: 165,158,616 (▲14.4%)
- Most populous Division/District: Dhaka Division (44,444,723)
- Least populous Division/District: Barisal Division (9,100,102)

The 2022 Bangladeshi census (Bengali: বাংলাদেশের আদমশুমারি ২০২২) was a detailed enumeration of the Bangladeshi population constituting the sixth national census in the country. It was scheduled to be held in June 2022, was conducted by the Bangladesh Bureau of Statistics, and the reference day used for the census was June 15, 2022. It was initially scheduled to be held in 2021 but was delayed due to complications caused by the COVID-19 pandemic and a lack of equipment.

== Background ==
After the Independence of Bangladesh in 1971, censuses were held in the years 1974, 1981, 1991, 2001, and 2011. The last census taken in the country was the 2011 census, which recorded a total population of 144.0 million (this figure, however, was estimated by the Bureau to have been an undercount, and the actual population was estimated to be 149.8 million).

Plans were made to conduct the next census of Bangladesh in January 2021, with the master plan having been prepared in 2018. In October the following year, ৳1,761 crore were earmarked for the project by the Executive Committee of the National Economic Council. However, due to the COVID-19 pandemic, the Bangladesh Bureau of Statistics (BBS) was unable to conduct the census, delaying the exercise to October 2021.

As the October 2021 deadline approached, the BBS still was not fully prepared to conduct the census, as the government refused to purchase 395,000 tablet computers which were meant to be used in the enumeration. The BBS had made changes to the 2018 master plan in June, shifting the method of the census from manual to digital, which was expected to reduce the cost of the operation by 11% to ৳1,575 crore. Complications regarding equipment continued until March 2022, when the government approved the purchase of the tablets. The next month, the BBS announced the new schedule for the census.

== Design ==
The 2022 Census of Bangladesh employed 370,000 enumerators. The exercise was also the country's first digital census, making use of GIS mapping, tablet computers, and a Computer-assisted personal interviewing system to record data. A post-census survey was conducted in 350 selected sample areas in order to ascertain the accuracy of the operation. The process lasted from 15 June 2022 to 21 June 2022. The reference point of the census was 15 June 2022 at midnight.

== Result ==
=== Population and other criteria ===
Population (Enumerated)
Male	81,769,266
Female	83,381,226
Third gender	8,124
Total Population	165,158,616
Inhabitants
Rural area	113,109,157
Urban area	52,049,459

=== Religion ===
Population percentage based on religion.
1. Islam (91.1%)
2. Hinduism (7.96%)
3. Buddhism (0.61%)
4. Christianity (0.30%)
5. Other religions (0.06%)

=== Literacy ===
The literacy rate in the country has increased by 22.89%, according to the latest census. The rate of literacy was 51.77% in 2011 and it is now 74.80% in 2022.

== See also ==
- 1991 Census of Bangladesh
- 2001 Census of Bangladesh
- 2011 Census of Bangladesh
- Demographics of Bangladesh
