= Dilara Choudhury =

Bangladeshi academic

Dilara Choudhury is an academic and political analyst. She was the Professor and Chair of the Department of Government and Politics at Jahangirnagar University. She is a trustee member of trustee board of Gono Bishwabidyalay.

== Education ==
Choudhury did her PhD at the University of Dhaka in Asian government.

== Career ==
From 1989 to 1991, Chowdhury was a visiting scholar at Columbia University. She was a member of the USAID sponsored Democracy Assessment Team in 1992.

Choudhury was a Fulbright Visiting Scholar at the University of Maryland, College Park from 1996 to 1997.

In November 2004, Choudhury wrote about Border Security Force of India pushing Bengali Muslims at gunpoint into Bangladesh while being resisted by the Bangladesh Rifles. She called on the two countries to resolve border disputes through negotiations. She was awarded the Begum Rokeya Padak. In 2006, she was awarded the UGC Award for The Sexual harassment of Bangladeshi Women at the Workplace.

In 2008, Choudhury said she expected better politics from Khaleda Zia and Sheikh Hasina following the Fakruddin Ahmed led caretaker government rule. She urged politicians to learn from the mistakes that led to 1/11 and the 2006–2008 Bangladesh political crisis which led to the Fakhruddin Ahmed ministry to prevent another reoccurrence.

Choudhury praised Nurul Islam Nahid, minister of education, for promoting non-communal education and for the first time in Bangladesh providing textbooks for free of cost to students across the country in 2010. She praised the Awami League government policies while expressing concern about decentralization. In April 2018, she was made a member of the trustee of Gono Bishwabidyalay replacing Professor Halima Khatun. In May 2019, she attended an iftar of the Bangladesh Nationalist Party for foreign diplomats.

Choudhury attended an iftar party hosted by the Bangladesh Nationalist Party in April 2022 for foreign diplomats. She signed a statement demanding the release of Mirza Fakhrul Islam Alamgir, general secretary of the Bangladesh Nationalist Party. She teaches at North South University. In January 2024, she called Bangladesh a one-party state under Prime Minister Sheikh Hasina.

== Personal life ==
Choudhury was married to Golam Wahed Choudhury. They had two sons Golam Mabud who lives in Warren, New Jersey and Golam Sayeed, who lives in Baltimore, Maryland. Golam Wahed Choudhury was the Minister of Communications of Pakistan from 1969 to 1971 when he devised a plan for a united federated Pakistan. He went into exile after the Independence of Bangladesh, first to the United Kingdom and afterwards to the United States.

== Bibliography ==
- Bangladesh and the South Asian International System
- Constitutional Development in Bangladesh: Stresses and Strains
