= Implementation Monitoring and Evaluation Division =

- বাস্তবায়ন পরিবীক্ষণ ও মূল্যায়ন বিভাগ

Agency overview
- Formed: January 1975
- Preceding agencies: Project Implementation Bureau (PIB); Project Monitoring Division (PMD)
- Jurisdiction: Government of Bangladesh
- Headquarters: Dhaka, Bangladesh
- Parent department: Ministry of Planning
- Website: imed.gov.bd

The Implementation Monitoring and Evaluation Division (Bengali: বাস্তবায়ন পরিবীক্ষণ ও মূল্যায়ন বিভাগ, IMED) is a Bangladesh government division under the Ministry of Planning. It is responsible for the monitoring and evaluation (M&E) of development projects under the country's Annual Development Program (ADP). It is also responsible for inspecting field projects and submitting reports to the President of Bangladesh and the relevant ministers. The division oversees the activities of Bangladesh Public Procurement Authority (BPPA).

== History ==
IMED was originally established in January 1975 as the Project Implementation Bureau (PIB), a department under the President's office. In 1977, PIB was elevated to divisional status and renamed the Project Monitoring Division (PMD). In 1982, PMD was renamed Implementation Monitoring and Evaluation Division (IMED). It was transferred to the Ministry of Planning in 1984.

In 1987, IMED began conducting post-evaluations of selected projects, regardless of their sources of funding. Following an Asian Development Bank review that began in 1994, the division received funding support from the bank in 1997 to upgrade its project post-evaluation capabilities.

Its functions are set out in Schedule I of the Rules of Business, 1996.
