= Bangladesh Public Procurement Authority =

Bangladeshi government agency

- বাংলাদেশ পাবলিক প্রকিউরমেন্ট অথরিটি

Agency overview
- Formed: 18 September 2023
- Preceding agency: Central Procurement Technical Unit
- Jurisdiction: Government of Bangladesh
- Headquarters: BPPA Bhaban, Sher-e-Bangla Nagar, Dhaka-1207
- Agency executive: S.M. Moin Uddin Ahmed, Chief Executive Officer
- Parent agency: Implementation Monitoring and Evaluation Division
- Key document: Bangladesh Public Procurement Authority Act, 2023
- Website: www.bppa.gov.bd

The Bangladesh Public Procurement Authority (Bengali: বাংলাদেশ পাবলিক প্রকিউরমেন্ট অথরিটি); BPPA in short, is a statutory body within the Implementation Monitoring and Evaluation Division of Ministry of Planning of the Government of Bangladesh, responsible for regulating and overseeing public procurement processes to ensure transparency, accountability, efficiency, and sustainability. Established in 2023 as the successor to the Central Procurement Technical Unit, BPPA manages the national electronic Government Procurement (e-GP) system and formulates policies, rules, and guidelines for public procurement in accordance with the Public Procurement Act, 2006 and its amendments.

== History ==
The origins of BPPA lie in the establishment of the Central Procurement Technical Unit (CPTU) in April 2002 under the Implementation Monitoring and Evaluation Division (IMED) of the Ministry of Planning. CPTU was created in response to recommendations from various studies highlighting inefficiencies and lack of transparency in public procurement practices in Bangladesh. With support from the World Bank through the Public Procurement Reform Project (PPRP), CPTU spearheaded key reforms, including the enactment of the Public Procurement Act (PPA), 2006, and the Public Procurement Rules (PPR), 2007. CPTU introduced the electronic Government Procurement (e-GP) system in 2012 to digitize and streamline procurement processes, significantly reducing corruption and enhancing competition. Over two decades, CPTU built capacity through training programs and monitored procurement activities across government entities.To address evolving challenges, including technological advancements and the need for greater institutional autonomy, the government transformed CPTU into a full-fledged authority. The Bangladesh Public Procurement Authority Bill, 2023, was introduced in the Jatiya Sangsad on 5 July 2023 and passed on 10 September 2023. The resulting Bangladesh Public Procurement Authority Act, 2023 (Act No. 32 of 2023), was published in the official gazette on 18 September 2023, officially establishing BPPA. The first Chief Executive Officer was appointed on 28 November 2023.In 2025, the Public Procurement Act, 2006, was amended via the Public Procurement (Amendment) Ordinance, 2025, further empowering BPPA. The Public Procurement Rules, 2025, comprising 154 rules and 21 schedules, were gazetted on 28 September 2025 to align with these amendments and promote sustainable procurement practices.

== Functions and responsibilities ==
BPPA's mandate, as outlined in the 2023 Act, includes a wide range of functions to regulate public procurement nationwide:

- formulating, amending, and updating public procurement rules, guidelines, and standard tender documents (STDs).
- overseeing the operation and maintenance of the national e-GP portal (eprocure.gov.bd).
- conducting training and capacity-building programs for procurement professionals, including a mandatory 3-week course on public procurement management.
- monitoring, evaluating, and auditing procurement activities to ensure compliance with laws and rules.
- promoting sustainable public procurement (SPP) through policies that incorporate environmental, social, and economic considerations.
- handling complaints, debarments, and dispute resolutions related to procurement.
- collecting, analyzing, and publishing annual procurement data and reports.
- advising the government on procurement policy reforms and international best practices.

BPPA also issues circulars for clarifications, such as on Rule 154 of the PPR, 2025, and manages tender fees and debarment lists.

== Organizational structure ==
BPPA is headquartered at BPPA Bhaban in Sher-e-Bangla Nagar, Dhaka, and operates under the administrative oversight of the Implementation Monitoring and Evaluation Division, Ministry of Planning. It is led by a Chief Executive Officer (CEO), who holds the rank of Secretary to the Government and reports to the Minister of Planning.The CEO is supported by a team of directors, system analysts, and support staff. Key positions include:Chief Executive Officer: S.M. Moin Uddin Ahmed (as of 2025) Several Directors (Deputy Secretaries) overseeing divisions such as policy, e-GP, training, monitoring, and administration. Technical roles including Senior System Analyst (Md. Mosharraf Hussain) and programmers for IT support.

The organogram emphasizes functional divisions for procurement reform, e-GP management, and sustainable practices, with a focus on digital innovation and professional development.

== Electronic Government Procurement (e-GP) system ==
A cornerstone of BPPA's operations is the e-GP system, launched by CPTU in 2012 and now managed by BPPA. The platform facilitates online tendering, bidding, and contract awards, serving over 50,000 registered users and handling thousands of tenders annually. In 2025, e-GP recorded a record surge in registrations and tenders, reflecting increased adoption and efficiency gains. BPPA continues to update the system with features like revised guidelines (2025) and integration of sustainable procurement criteria.

== Key initiatives ==
The country's Sustainable Public Procurement (SPP) Policy of 2023 aims to embed green and inclusive practices in procurement.

Other initiatives include:

- Training Programs: Annual 3-week certification courses on PPA and PPR for government officials. The Chartered Institute of Procurement & Supply announced in 2021 its involvement in the training of 75 government professional procurement staff to MCIPS standard by 2023.
- Data Transparency: Publication of annual procurement reports and real-time e-GP dashboards.
- Reform Reviews: Ongoing updates to STDs and rules, including the Public Procurement Rules, 2025.
