= Golam Wahed Choudhury =

East Pakistani political scientist and diplomat

- Born: 1926; Faridpur District, Bengal Presidency, British India
- Died: 13 December 1997 (aged 71); Washington, D.C., United States
- Education: University of Calcutta; Columbia University
- Spouse: Dilara Choudhury

Golam Wahed Choudhury (1926 – 13 December 1997), also known as G. W. Choudhury, was a political scientist and diplomat from East Pakistan, which later became Bangladesh. He worked as the Director General of the Research Division of the Pakistani foreign ministry and later as Pakistan's Minister of Communications. After the separation of Bangladesh, he returned to academic work. He authored several books on Pakistan's international relations, and taught at the University of Dhaka, Royal Institute of International Affairs (England), Columbia University and other institutions.

== Early life ==
Choudhury was born in 1926 at Faridpur District in then Bengal Presidency, British India (now Bangladesh) to Golam Mawla Choudhury and Fatima Choudhury. Fatima's father, Ibrahim Saber, was Begum Rokeya’s eldest brother.

== Education ==
Golam obtained his bachelor's in 1945 and master's in 1948 in political science from the University of Calcutta. He earned his PhD from Columbia University in 1956.

== Career ==
In 1948, Choudhury joined the department of international relations faculty of the University of Dhaka as a lecturer and later the department of political science.

He joined Pakistan's foreign ministry in 1967 as director-general of the Research Division. Prior to that, he was involved with the formulation of the 1965 Tashkent Agreement with India. From 1969 to 1971, he was the Minister of Communications in the Government of Pakistan. He made proposals for establishing a confederation between East Pakistan and West Pakistan.

After the separation of East Pakistan as Bangladesh in 1971, Choudhury went into exile. He worked at the Royal Institute of International Affairs in England, and later at Columbia University in New York. He also taught at North Carolina Central University and Duke University. He returned to Dhaka in 1985, but continued his association with Columbia University as an adjunct professor till 1994.

Choudhury created the Golam Mowla Fatima Trust and established a number of charitable institutions in Madaripur district.

== Bibliography ==
- Choudhury, G. W. (1969) [1959]. Constitutional Development in Pakistan. London: Longman. ISBN 9780582780071.
- —— (1963). Democracy in Pakistan. Dhaka: Green Book House. OCLC 862484.
- —— (1967). Documents and Speeches on the Constitution of Pakistan. Dhaka: Green Book House. OCLC 1020813.
- —— (1968). Pakistan's Relations with India, 1947-1966. Praeger. OCLC 443793.
- —— (1974). The Last days of United Pakistan. Indiana University Press. ISBN 978-0-253-33260-8.
- —— (1975). India, Pakistan, Bangladesh, and the Major Powers: Politics of a Divided Subcontinent. Free Press. ISBN 978-0-02-905390-4.
- —— (1977). Chinese Perception of the World. University Press of America. ISBN 978-0-8191-0527-1.
- —— (1982). China in World Affairs: The Foreign Policy of the PRC since 1970. Boulder, CO: Westview Press. ISBN 978-0-86531-329-3.
- —— (1983). Islam and the Modern Muslim World. London: Scorpion. ISBN 978-0-905906-43-0.
- —— (1988). Pakistan, Transition from Military to Civilian Rule. London: Scorpion. ISBN 978-0-905906-68-3.
- —— (1990). Islam and the Contemporary World. London: Indus Thames. ISBN 978-1-85555-000-1.

=== Reception ===
Richard L. Park, in reviewing Pakistan's Relations with India, 1947-1966, noted that Choudhury's interest is in portraying Pakistan's point of view. The book selectively quotes evidence and authorities that support Pakistan's position.

Norman Palmer sees the study as fullest and "most satisfactory" in its coverage of the historical context, the partition of India and the first decade of relations between India and Pakistan. While Palmer understands the author's "pro-Pakistani bias" he notes that the analysis is scholarly with the sole exception of the coverage to the 1965 India-Pakistan war.

Wayne Wilcox reviews the book as a well-written "defense lawyer's brief" which gathers a large amount of evidence to convince the jury. Wilcox notes that being written at Cambridge, the book exercises a restrained tone which shows "some detachment".

== Personal life ==
Choudhury was married to Dilara Choudhury, a professor of political science at Jahangirnagar University, Savar. Together they had two sons, Golam Mabud and Golam Sayeed.

== Death ==
Choudhury died, aged 71, on 13 December 1997 at Georgetown University Hospital in Washington, D.C. They had two sons Golam Mabud who lives in Warren, New Jersey and Golam Sayeed, who lives in Baltimore, Maryland.
