= Husne Ara Shahed =

Bangladeshi academic and novelist (1943–2022)

- হোসনে আরা শাহেদ
- Born: 1943; Village: Joykrishnapur, Maijdee, Noakhali, Bangladesh
- Died: 7 July 2022 (aged 78–79)
- Citizenship: Bangladesh
- Education: MA in Philosophy
- Alma mater: University of Dhaka
- Occupations: Writer, columnist, editor, educationist and teacher
- Spouse: A. F. Shahed Ali
- Children: Two sons (Faheem Hasan Shahed, Feeda Hasan Shahed) & a daughter Farah Deena)
- Writing career
- Pen name: Jagory (bn: জাগরী)
- Language: Bengali

Husne Ara Shahed (Bengali: হোসনে আরা শাহেদ) was a Bangladeshi author and educationist.

== Biography ==
She was former principal of Sher-e-Bangla Balika Mahavidyalaya in Dhaka.

Ara was married to A. F. Shahed Ali. They have two sons and one daughter. Her son Faheem Hasan Shahed is an academic.

She was a trustee of Gono University.

== Bibliography ==
=== Books ===
Her story Sarojinir Chhabi is taught as a text in Department of Modern Indian Languages & Literary Studies (Bengali), University of Delhi.

Year	Title	Publisher
1977	চলমান দিন (Ongoing Day)	Bangladesh Books International
1978	নিহত আগুন্তুক (Killed outsider)	Wari Book Centre
1980	বৈরী সমাজ (Hostile society)	Wari Book Centre
1986	গিন্নীর ডাইরি (Diary of housewife)	Boighar
1986	জীবন থেকে (From life)	Naoroj
1988	ডায়নার ছেলে, সোনাভানের মেয়ে (Son of Daina, Daughter of Sonabhan)	Palak
	স্মৃতিময় ঢাকা বিশ্ববিদ্যালয় (Memorable Dhaka University)	Dhaka University Alumni Association
	প্রবন্ধ সংকলন (Collection of essays)	Chandrabati Academy
2008	বাংলাদেশের শিক্ষাব্যবস্থা (Education system of Bangladesh)	Suchipatra
	শাড়ি (Sari)	Bangla Academy
2008	বাংলাদেশের মুক্তিযুদ্ধ (Liberation war of Bangladesh)	Suchipatra
	মরু ঝরনা(Fountain of Desert)	

=== Edited books ===
- Dhaka University in the Nineties, Unforgettable Dhaka University, published by Dhaka University Alumni Association, in February 2006.
- মুক্তিযুদ্ধের শতগল্প (in Bengali) (Hundred stories of Liberation war) published by Globe library in 2001.

=== Articles and short stories ===
- "Scientist, academic and litterateur Abdullah Al-Muti Shorfuddin". Daily Jai Jai Din (in Bengali). 30 November 2012.

== Awards ==
Shahed received many awards.

- Award of Bangladesh Lekhika Songho (1998)
- Special Awards from Dhaka University Philosophy Department Alumni Association (2012)

== Death ==
Shahed died on 7 July 2022 in Dhaka.

== See also ==
- Tahmima Anam
- List of Muslim writers and poets
