= Gonoshasthaya Samaj Vittik Medical College =

Bangladeshi private medical college

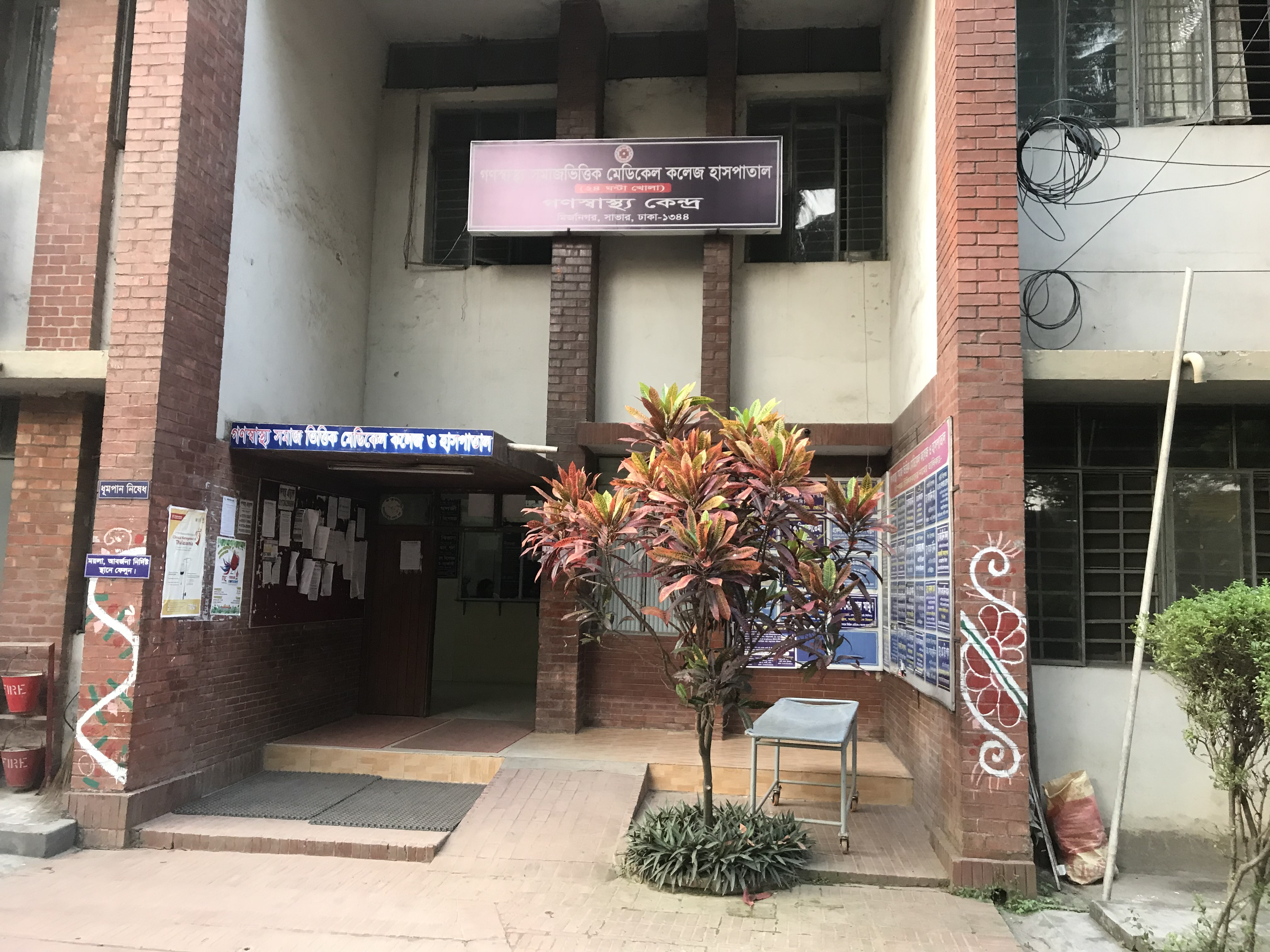

Gonoshasthaya Samaj Vittik Medical College is a private medical school in Bangladesh, established in 1998. It is located in Savar Upazila, in the Dhaka District of the Dhaka Division. It is affiliated with Dhaka University.

It admits 110 students every year to a five-year course of study leading to a Bachelor of Medicine, Bachelor of Surgery (MBBS) degree. A one-year internship after graduation is compulsory for all graduates. The courses are approved by The University Grants Commission (UGC) and the Ministry of Education. The degree is recognized by the Bangladesh Medical and Dental Council.

The college has five academic hospitals: Savar, Dhanmondi, Gazipur, Pabna at Kashinathpur, and Gaibandha. The college has an additional 17 primary health centers.
