= Statistics and Informatics Division =

Government agency of Bangladesh

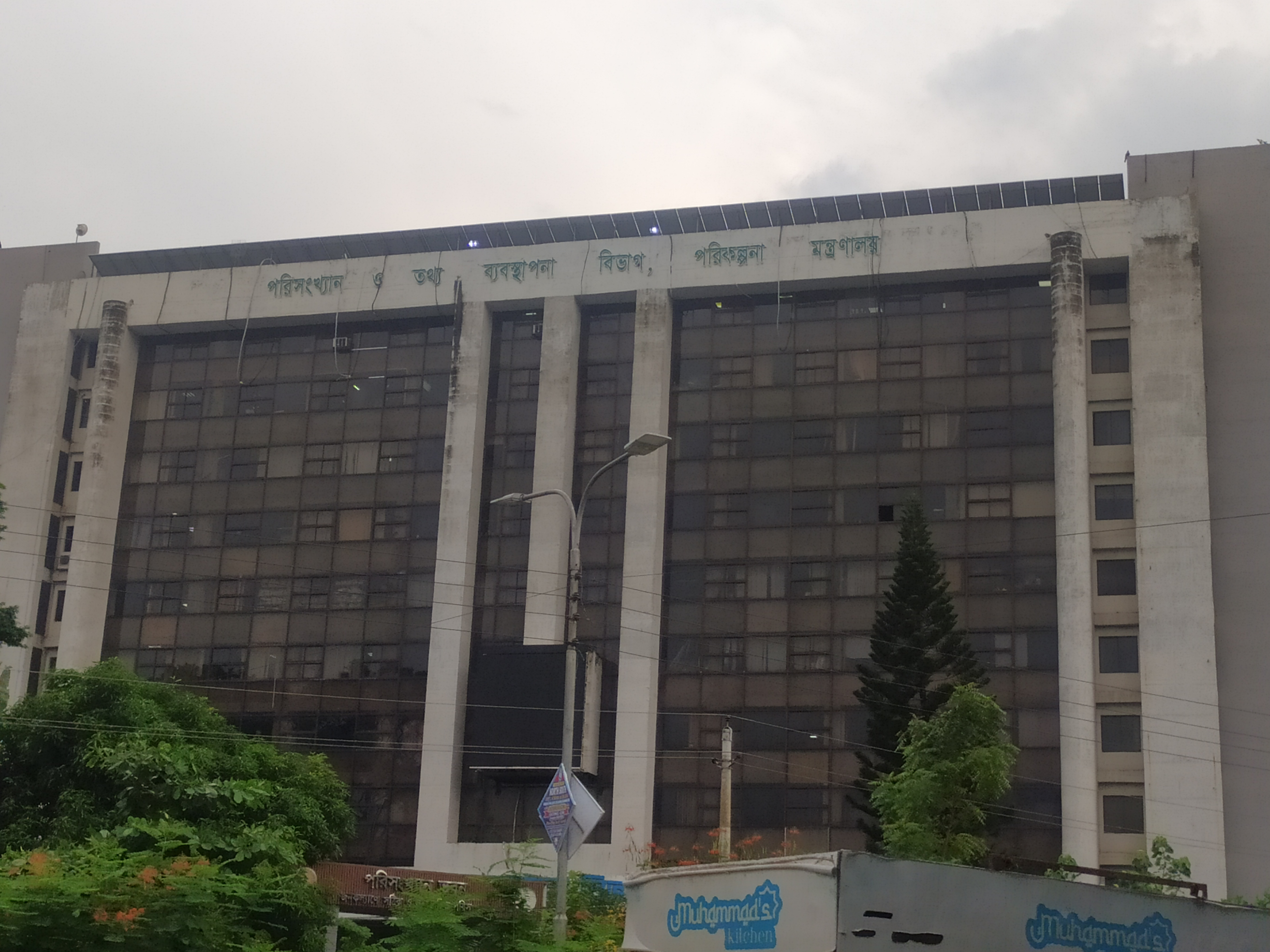
- Formation: 1975
- Headquarters: Dhaka, Bangladesh
- Region served: Bangladesh
- Official language: Bengali
- Website: Statistics and Informatics Division

Statistics and Informatics Division (Bengali: পরিসংখ্যান ও তথ্য ব্যবস্থাপনা বিভাগ) is a Bangladesh government department under the Planning Ministry. The division is responsible for analyzing statistics for the government and providing information. Saurendra Nath Chakrabhartty is the head of the division.

== History ==
The Statistics Division was established in 1975 and was tasked with overseeing the Bangladesh Bureau of Statistics, which was formed in 1974. On 25 October 1999, "Parishangkhan Bhaban", the headquarters of the division was inaugurated by Prime Minister Sheikh Hasina. The division was abolished in 2002 and turned into a wing of the Ministry of Planning. In 2010, the division was recreated and in 2012 it was renamed to Statistics and Informatics Division.
