= Bangladesh Field Hospital =

Temporary medical centre during the Liberation War of Bangladesh

- Photo of Bangladesh Field Hospital

Geography
- Location: Melaghar, West Tripura, Tripura, India

Organisation
- Type: Normal
- Patron: Dr. M A Mobin; Dr. Zafrullah Chowdhury

Services
- Beds: 480

History
- Founded: 1971
- Closed: 1972

Bangladesh Field Hospital (Popularly known as Bangladesh Hospital) was a temporary medical centre under the Sector-2 during the Liberation War of Bangladesh in 1971. The hospital was an initiative of Captain Akhtar Ahmed, who was a physician of 4th East Bengal Regiment in Comilla Cantonment. It was situated in Tripura, India.

== Background ==
The almost nine-month long Liberation War of Bangladesh commenced on 26 March 1971 after the Pakistan Army cracked down on the Bengali population of then East Pakistan. The Pakistan Army also targeted Bengali officers and soldiers of the armed forces across the country.

As a result of a period of systematic terror enacted by the Pakistan Army, East Pakistan revolted against Pakistan and retaliated against the Army.

== History ==
The Bangladesh Hospital began in a cowshed of Shimantopur, a bordering area of Bangladesh, started by Captain Akhtar Ahmed on 29 March 1971. The first patient was a villager who had been shot in the leg. Akhtar chose Naik Shamsu Miah from the East Pakistan Rifles as his assistant.

Later on 9 May 1971, after the 4th East Bengal Regiment had to retreat due to a shortage of ammunition, Ahmed moved his hospital to a forest rest house of Sonamura of Tripura in India. During those days nurse Subedar Mannan joined Ahmed. The centre suffered from shortages of equipment and facilities. And Ahmed who was the Company Commander of 4th East Bengal Regiment during the war was thinking of again shifting the hospital.

Shortly after the battle of Shalda River on 1 June, Major Khaled Mosharraf directed Ahmed to establish a hospital with more facilities.

Ahmed moved his medical centre to Matinagar, adjacent to the Sector-2 headquarters of Agartala. They set up a tent in Daroga Bagicha, 3 kilometres (2 mi) away from the Melaghar headquarters.

Ahmed was accompanied by Captain Dr. Sitara Begum, Saeeda Kamal, Sultana Kamal, Shamsuddin a final year medical student, Dalia Ahmed, Linu Billah, Habibul Alam; and his two sisters Asma and Reshma.

At the end of June Dr. Zafrullah Chowdhury and Dr. M A Mobin, two Bengali physicians who were studying in London, met Ahmed in Sonamura and asked about his needs. Ahmed asked them to collect essential medical equipment.

Later, the Provisional Government of Bangladesh granted BDT thirty thousand rupiah for the hospital and Ahmed set up a 200-bed complex in Bishramganj in Tripura. The hospital complex started operation on 26 August 1971.

Dr. Mobin, who was studying for FRCS degree, modernized the operation theatre of the hospital. The hospital was transformed into a 400-bed one by the end of the war in December.

Sitara Begum served as the Commanding Officer of the Bangladesh Hospital.

== Doctors ==
- Col.Khaled Musharaf order to establish this Hospital
- Major Akhtar Ahmed made a Budget but it was not sufficient for construction
- Dr.M.A.Mobin who sold his house & car in UK to help the war casualties
- Rangamati Magistrate Mr.H.T Imam send send some Bangladesh Engineers construct this hospital
- Dr. Nazimuddin Ahmed worked as Anesthesiologist
- Dr. Zafrullah Chowdhury join in September
- Captain Sitara Begum join in October as Administrator
- Shamsuddin left with Daila Salahuddin in September
- A.S.M Mahmood
- Kiron Sankhan Debnath
- Morshed Chowdhury
- M.A Qusem
- Mohammad Zubayer
- Lutfar Rahman

== Recognition ==
The initiative of Bangladesh Hospital was appreciated by Provisional Government of Bangladesh. After the Liberation War of Bangladesh ended on 16 December 1971, the Government of Bangladesh awarded Dr. Akhtar Ahmed and Dr. Sitara Begum with gallantry award Bir Protik for their remarkable contribution for the hospital.
