= Ministry of Planning (Bangladesh) =

Government ministry of Bangladesh

- পরিকল্পনা মন্ত্রণালয়
- Government Seal of Bangladesh

Ministry overview
- Formed: 12 January 2002; 24 years ago
- Jurisdiction: Government of Bangladesh
- Headquarters: Bangladesh Secretariat, Dhaka
- Annual budget: ৳33251 crore (US$2.7 billion) (2026-2027)
- Minister responsible: Amir Khasru Mahmud Chowdhury
- Minister of State responsible: Zonayed Saki
- Ministry executives: Satyajit Karmaker, Senior Secretary, Planning Division; Dr. Shahnaz Arefin, ndc, Secretary, Statistics and Informatics Division; Abu Hena Morshed Zaman, Secretary, Implementation Monitoring and Evaluation Division
- Child agencies: Planning Division; Statistics and Informatics Division; Implementation Monitoring and Evaluation Division
- Website: mop.gov.bd

The Ministry of Planning (Bengali: পরিকল্পনা মন্ত্রণালয়; Parikalpanā mantraṇālaẏa) oversees the financial policies of the Bangladeshi Government, responsible for socioeconomic planning and statistics management.

== Divisions and agencies ==
1. Planning Division

- Bangladesh Institute of Development Studies (BIDS)
- Planning Commission (PC)

2. Statistics and Informatics Division (SID)

- Bangladesh Bureau of Statistics (BBS)

3. Implementation Monitoring and Evaluation Division (IMED)

- Bangladesh Public Procurement Authority (BPPA)
