= Gonoshasthaya Kendra =

- Native name: গণস্বাস্থ্য কেন্দ্র
- Company type: Private
- Founded: 1972 in Savar, Dhaka
- Founder: Zafrullah Chowdhury
- Headquarters: Savar, Dhaka, Bangladesh
- Products: Public Medical
- Number of employees: 2,500
- Website: www.gonoshasthayakendra.com

Gonoshasthaya Kendra (Bengali: গণস্বাস্থ্য কেন্দ্র) is the first health center or hospital in independent Bangladesh. The organization earned highest national award of Bangladesh Government The Independence Day Award, 1977. In 1992, the hospital was also awarded the Right Livelihood Award for its "outstanding record of promotion of health and human development."

== History ==
The hospital was set up as Bangladesh Field Hospital in 1971 during Bangladesh Pakistan war in Tripura, India. Zafrullah Chowdhury is known as the founder of Gonoshasthaya Kendra. Zafrullah Chowdhury and MA Mobin was the only cardiac surgeon on this hospital.

== Formation ==
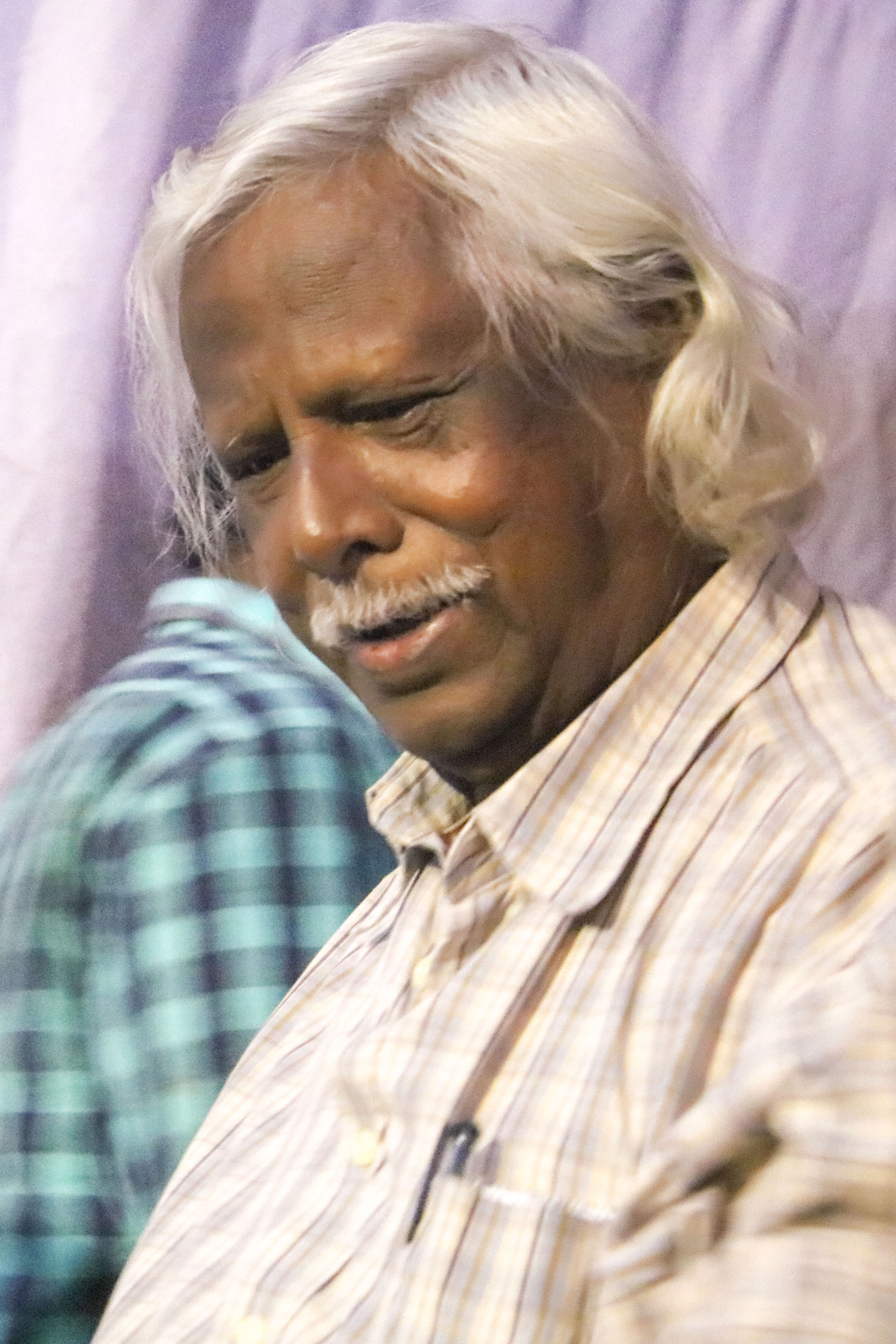
Zafrullah Chowdhury, the founder of Gonoshasthaya Kendra

The commander of Sector 2 also known as K-Force Major General Khaled Mosharraf was operating in this area. He named it as Bangladesh Field Hospital. At first it was only 480-bed hospital to treat wounded freedom fighters.

In the newly independent country Bangladesh, the government had objected to its name Bangladesh Field Hospital. Bangabandhu Sheikh Mujibur Rahman proposed to change the name and its structure for allowance. Then the Gonoshasthaya Kendra name came up and Sheikh Mujibur Rahman suggested Zafrullah, "Ganasasthtya Kendra will not only provide treatment, but it will also have to work on health, agriculture and education."

Zohra Begum, MA Rab, a joint secretary, and Lutfor Rahman donated five acres of land to the Gonoshasthaya Kendra from their family properties in Savar to build the hospital, while Sheikh Mujibur Rahman arranged a further 23 acres of land. Thus the hospital Gonoshasthaya Kendra began its journey in 1972.

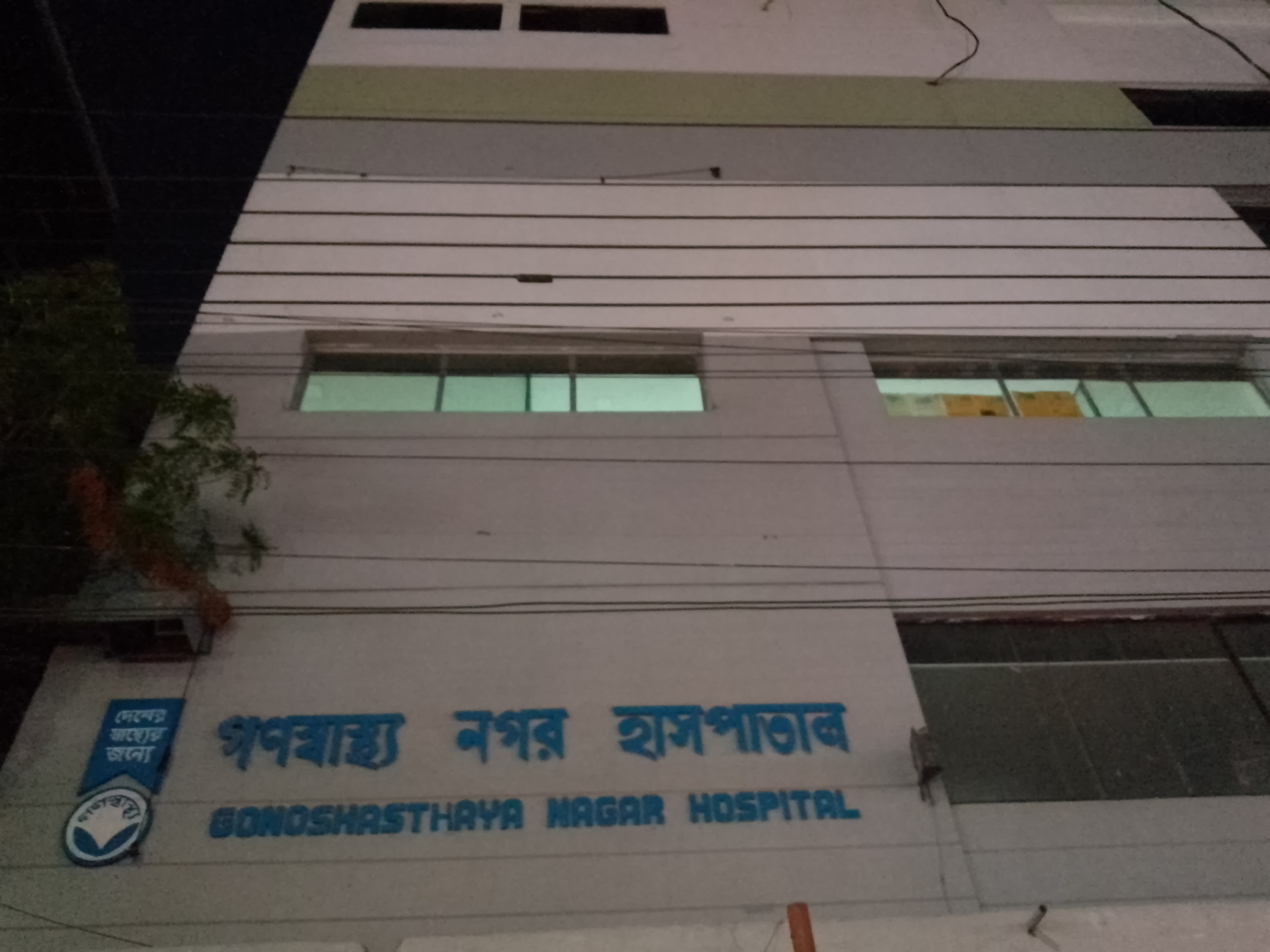
Gonoshasthaya Nagar Hospital in Dhaka

The hospital currently in 2018 employs 2,500 people, 40 percent of whom are women.

== Effect in war ==
This hospital was built to treat wounded freedom fighters in war with least capabilities. Zafrullah Chowdhury along with Dr MA Mobin began treating wounded freedom fighters.

== Controversy ==
On November 5, 2018 A clash broke out outside Gonoshasthaya Kendra in Savar.
