= Zafrullah Chowdhury =

Bangladeshi public health activist (1941–2023)

- জাফরুল্লাহ চৌধুরী
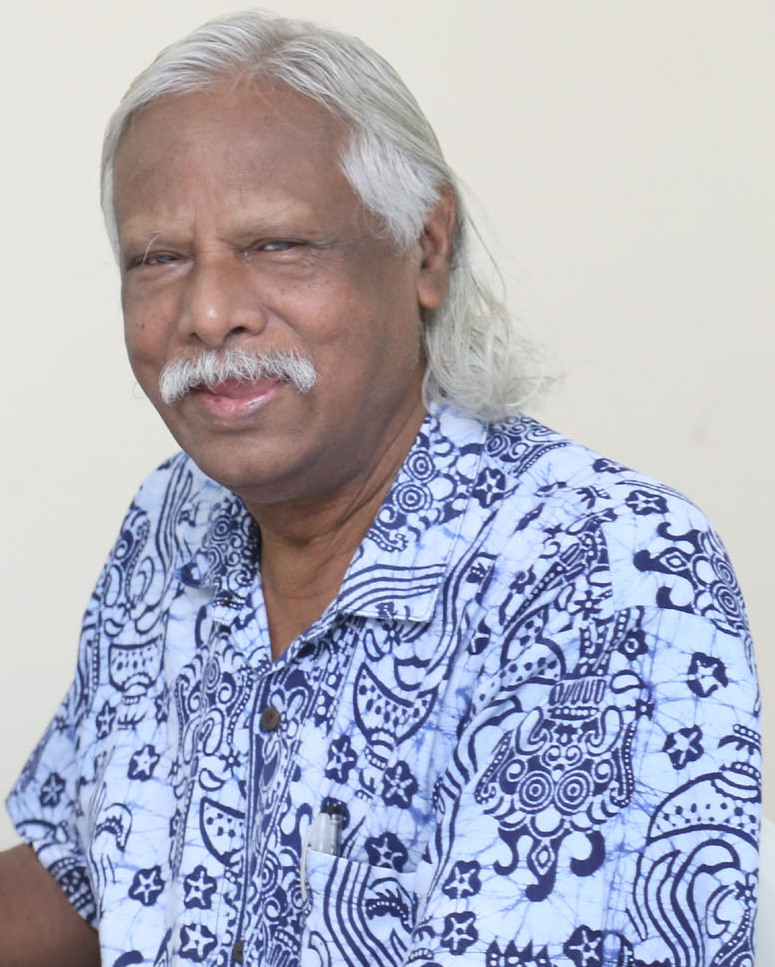
- Chowdhury at Suhrawardy Udyan (2018)
- Born: 27 December 1941; Raozan, Bengal Province, British India
- Died: 11 April 2023 (aged 81); Dhaka, Bangladesh
- Education: Dhaka College; Dhaka Medical College
- Occupations: Doctor, social activist
- Known for: Founder of Gonoshasthaya Kendra
- Spouse: Shireen Huq
- Relatives: Khaled Belal
- Awards: See full list

Zafrullah Chowdhury (27 December 1941 – 11 April 2023) was a Bangladeshi public health and social activist.

He was the founder of Gonoshasthaya Kendra, a rural healthcare organisation. He was known more for his work in formulating the Bangladesh National Drug Policy in 1982.

Chowdhury's work in population control earned him the inaugural Independence Day Award, the highest civilian award in Bangladesh, in 1977. He was posthumously awarded the same honor again in 2026 in recognition of his contributions to social service. Among other awards, he was given Ramon Magsaysay Award in 1985 and the Right Livelihood Award in 1992 for his work in the public health sector.

== Early life and career ==
Chowdhury spent his early childhood in Kolkata and later his family settled in East Pakistan (which later became Bangladesh). He was one of ten children born to his parents. After attending primary school in Nabakumar Institution at Bakshibazar, he studied at Jubilee School and then Dhaka College. He studied medicine at Dhaka Medical College, where he got involved with leftist political ideologies. As the general secretary of the Dhaka Medical College students' union, he held a press conference to expose the corruption at the hospital. After a turbulent student life, he finished his MBBS degree in 1964 and left for the UK for post-graduate studies in general and vascular surgery. In 1971, he fought for independence during Bangladesh Liberation War.

Chowdhury and Khaled Mosharraf were involved in setting up the Bangladesh Field Hospital a 480-bed Bangladesh Hospital for freedom fighters and the refugees. On 21 May, Khaled Mosharraf and Political Adviser of Sector 2 and 3, childhood friend of Zafrullah Chowdhury, R.K. Chowdhury came to the hospital and met Zafrullah Chowdhury. The hospital was run by a team of Bangladeshi doctors, medical students and volunteers. Women with no previous training in healthcare were trained within days to help out the patients. This experience in the field hospital led him to believe that an effective healthcare delivery system can be developed in rural Bangladesh by training women as a primary healthcare delivery platform. This achieved worldwide credibility when it was eventually published in The Lancet.

== Gonoshasthaya Kendra ==
In 1972, Chowdhury set up the Gonoshasthaya Kendra. The idea was introduced in a concept paper titled, 'Basic Health Care in Rural Bangladesh' in Dhaka. The centre focuses on providing basic healthcare to the rural areas. The centre also runs a university, vocational training centre, agricultural cooperatives, hospital, a printing press, community schools, and a generic drug manufacturing plant. Gonoshasthaya Kendra has been very successful in providing family planning services, and lowering maternal and infant mortality rates. Though limited in its reach, it pioneered the introduction of cheaper generic drugs. In 1973, Gonoshasthaya Kendra introduced a Rural Healthcare Insurance System, the first of its kind in Bangladesh.

Critiques have pointed out that rather than being national, the centre's reach has been confined to specific areas. However, Chowdhury believed that public health is a state matter, it can never be left to the private sector.

== National drug policy ==
Chowdhury gained prominence by being the driving force in formulating the Bangladesh National Drug Policy in 1982. Before that, 4,000 commercial drugs were available in the market, mostly manufactured by multinational companies or imported from abroad. Most of the drugs were out of reach for the majority of the people. Some of these drugs were unnecessary and even dangerous whereas the most essential 150 remained in short supply.

National drug policy changed all that. Following WHO guidelines for the developing countries, the policy restricted the manufacturing and import of the number of drugs to 225. It emphasised the manufacturing of generic drugs and manufacturing them locally. The result has been the wider availability of drugs at drastically reduced prices. And today, Bangladesh has turned into a drug-exporting country.

An analysis of the health sector of Bangladesh, which he was involved in 1987 and wrote along with Major General M.R. Choudhury (AFIP) as chairman and Dr. Yunus (Grameen Bank), was never published because of political reasons. However, it was highly appreciated by WHO.

== Controversy ==
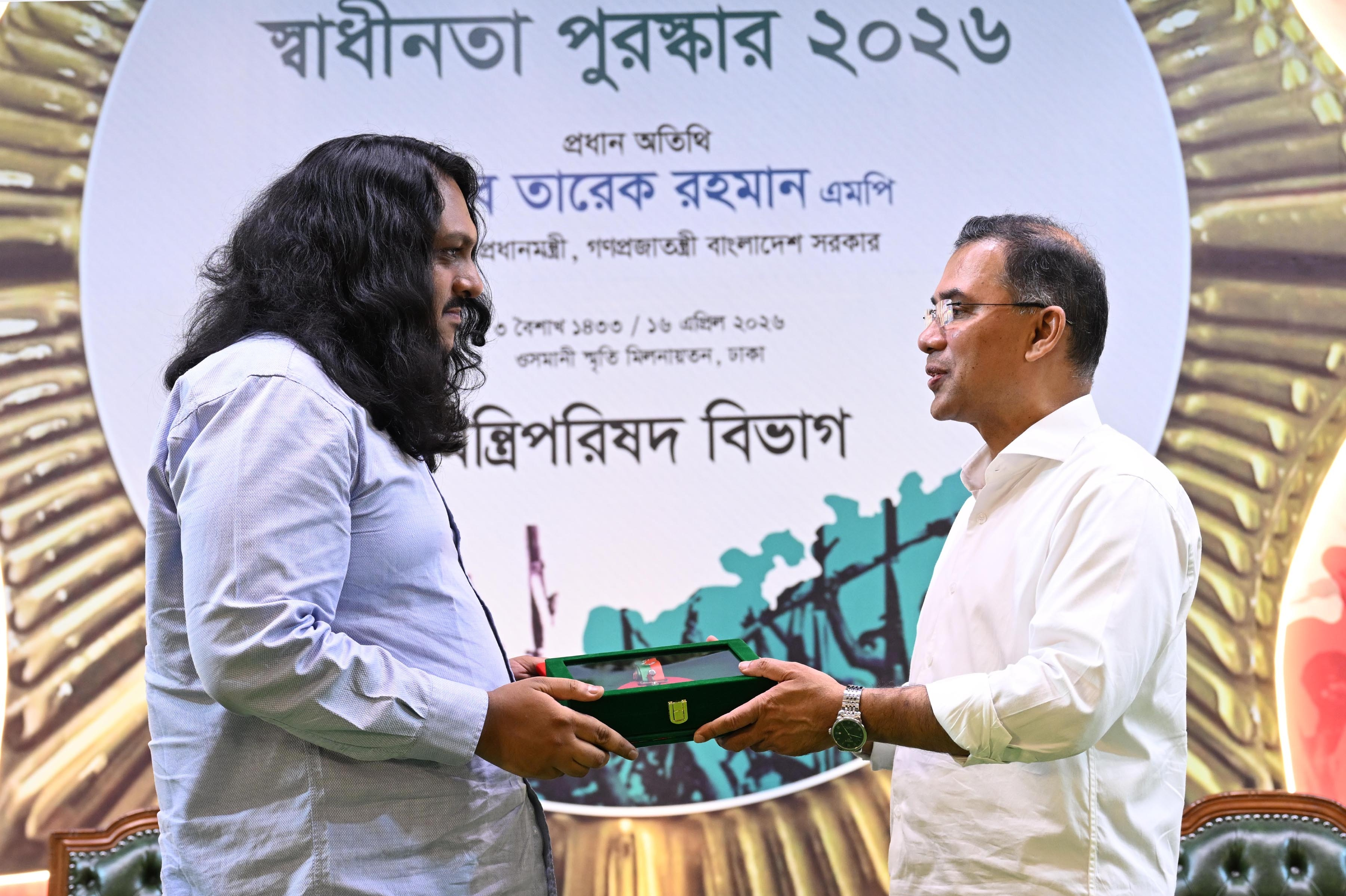
Chowdhury’s son receives Independence Award 2026 on behalf of him from Prime Minister Tarique Rahman

In 2015, the International Crimes Tribunal, which was set up to try perpetrators of war crimes committed during the Bangladesh Liberation War in 1971, charged Chowdhury on charge of contempt of court and sentenced him to "one hour" of 'confinement in the dock inside the courtroom" and fined him 5000 taka. The court found him guilty of contempt of court for his statement expressing concern over British journalist David Bergman's conviction. This came as a surprise to the public as being a freedom fighter, he was one of the vocal supporters of the controversial tribunal.

Following the announcement of his Independence Award posthumously in 2026, a controversy arose, as there was no provision for honoring someone twice with this award, and Chowdhury had already been awarded in 1977 for his contribution towards population control. Following the controversy, the rules of the award were amended to allow a second award in a different category, provided there is a gap of 25 years.

== Illness and death ==
Chowdhury suffered from kidney disease, septicaemia and liver problems after he was infected by COVID-19. On 5 April 2023, he was admitted to Gonoshasthaya Nagar Hospital, a hospital established by himself in Dhanmondi area in Dhaka, as his health condition deteriorated. Despite doctors stating he was responding to treatment, Chowdhury died hours later on 11 April 2023, at the age of 81.

== Awards ==
- 1974 – Swedish Youth Peace Prize
- 1977 – Independence Award, Bangladesh (for population control)
- 1992 – Right Livelihood Award, Sweden
- 1985 – Ramon Magsaysay Award for Community Leadership, Philippines
- 2009 – Doctor of Humanitarian Service (DHS), World Organization of Natural Medicine, Toronto, Canada
- 2010 – International Public Health Heroes Award, UC Berkeley, US
- 2022 – "NRB (Non-Resident Bangladeshi) Liberation War Hero 1971" awarded by Voice for Global Bangladeshis, UK.
- 2026 – Independence Award, Bangladesh (for social services)

== Personal life ==
Chowdhury was married to Shireen Huq. They have a son, Barish Chowdhury, and a daughter, Brishti Chowdhury.
