= Demographics of Bangladesh =

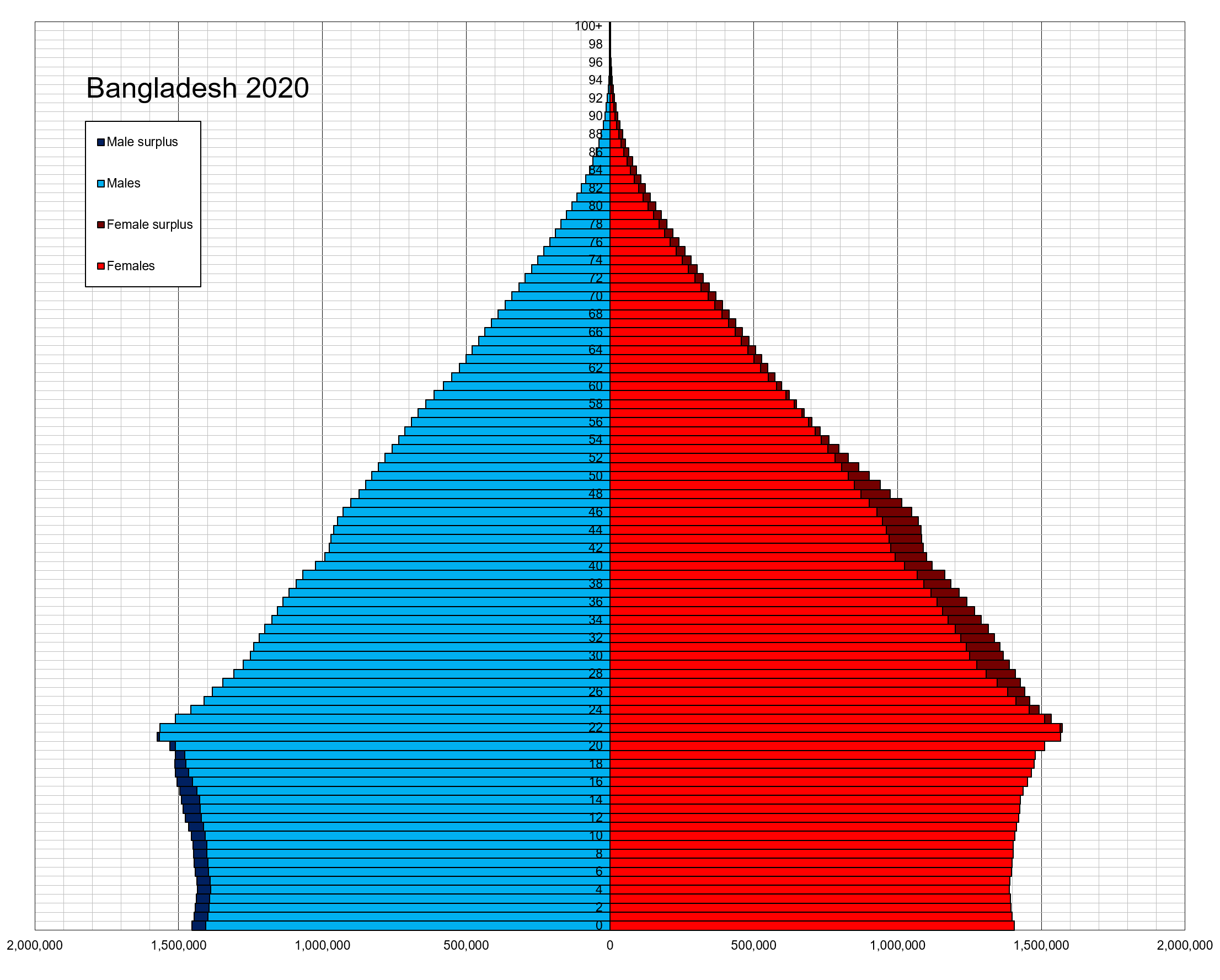
- Bangladesh population pyramid in 2020
- Population: 173,562,364 (2024 est.)
- Density: 1,333 people/km² (2024 est.)
- Growth rate: ▲1.22% (2024 est.)
- Birth rate: ▼19.99 births/1,000 population (2024 est.)
- Death rate: ▼5.10 deaths/1,000 population (2024 est.)
- Life expectancy: ▲74.9 years (2024 est.)
  - male: ▲73.3 years (2024 est.)
  - female: ▲76.7 years (2024 est.)
- Fertility rate: ▼2.1 children born/woman (2024 est.)
- Infant mortality: ▼16.9 deaths/1,000 live births (2024 est.)
- Net migration rate: -4.28 migrant(s)/1,000 population (2025 est.)

Sex ratio
- Total: 0.96 male(s)/female (2024 est.)
- At birth: 1.04 male(s)/female (2024 est.)
- Under 15: 1.04 male(s)/female (2024 est.)
- 15–64 years: 0.95 male(s)/female (2024 est.)
- 65 and over: 0.87 male(s)/female (2024 est.)

Nationality
- Nationality: Bangladeshi
- Major ethnic: Bengalis (99%)
- Minor ethnic: Chakma; Tripuri; Marma; Mundas; Garos; Oraons; Santhals; Mro; Manipuri; Zomi; Bihari; Khasi

Language
- Official: Standard Bengali
- Spoken: Bengali and its regional dialects

Bangladesh is the eighth-most populated country in the world, accounting for approximately 2.2% of the global population. According to the final results of the 2022 Census of Bangladesh, the country's population was 169,828,911. Bangladesh has one of the highest population densities in the world and is the only country ranked among the top ten globally in both population density and total population.

Bangladesh is largely ethnically homogeneous, with the Bengali ethnolinguistic group comprising around 99% of the population. The Chittagong Hill Tracts, Sylhet, Mymensingh, Barisal, and parts of North Bengal are home to diverse indigenous communities. Numerous dialects of Bengali are spoken across the country, with the dialects of Chittagong and Sylhet being particularly distinctive.

According to the 2022 census, approximately 91.04% of Bangladeshis are Muslims, followed by Hindus (7.95%), Buddhists (0.61%), Christians (0.30%), and others (0.12%).

Bangladesh has experienced a significant decline in fertility rates since its independence in 1971. The total fertility rate (TFR) decreased from over 6 births per woman in the 1970s to approximately 2.1 births per woman in 2024, nearing replacement-level fertility.

== Population ==
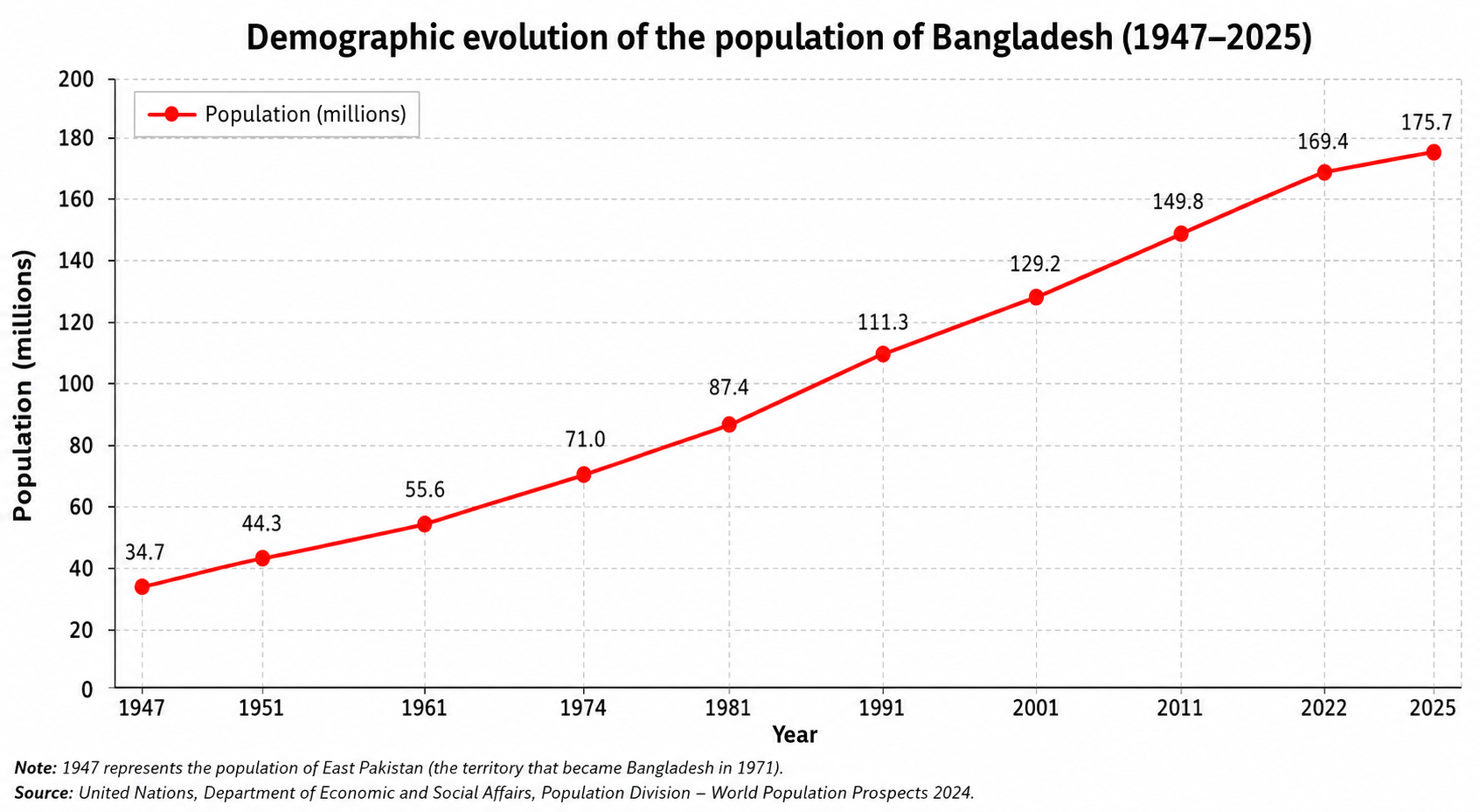
Demographic evolution of the population of Bangladesh (1947–2025)

The population of Bangladesh has grown rapidly since 1947, when the region was part of East Pakistan. According to United Nations estimates, the population increased from approximately 44 million in 1950 to around 175.7 million in 2025. Population growth accelerated during the second half of the 20th century before gradually slowing due to declining fertility rates.

As of mid-2025, the population of Bangladesh was estimated at 175,686,899 people, according to the United Nations World Population Prospects 2024 revision.

=== Population growth rate ===
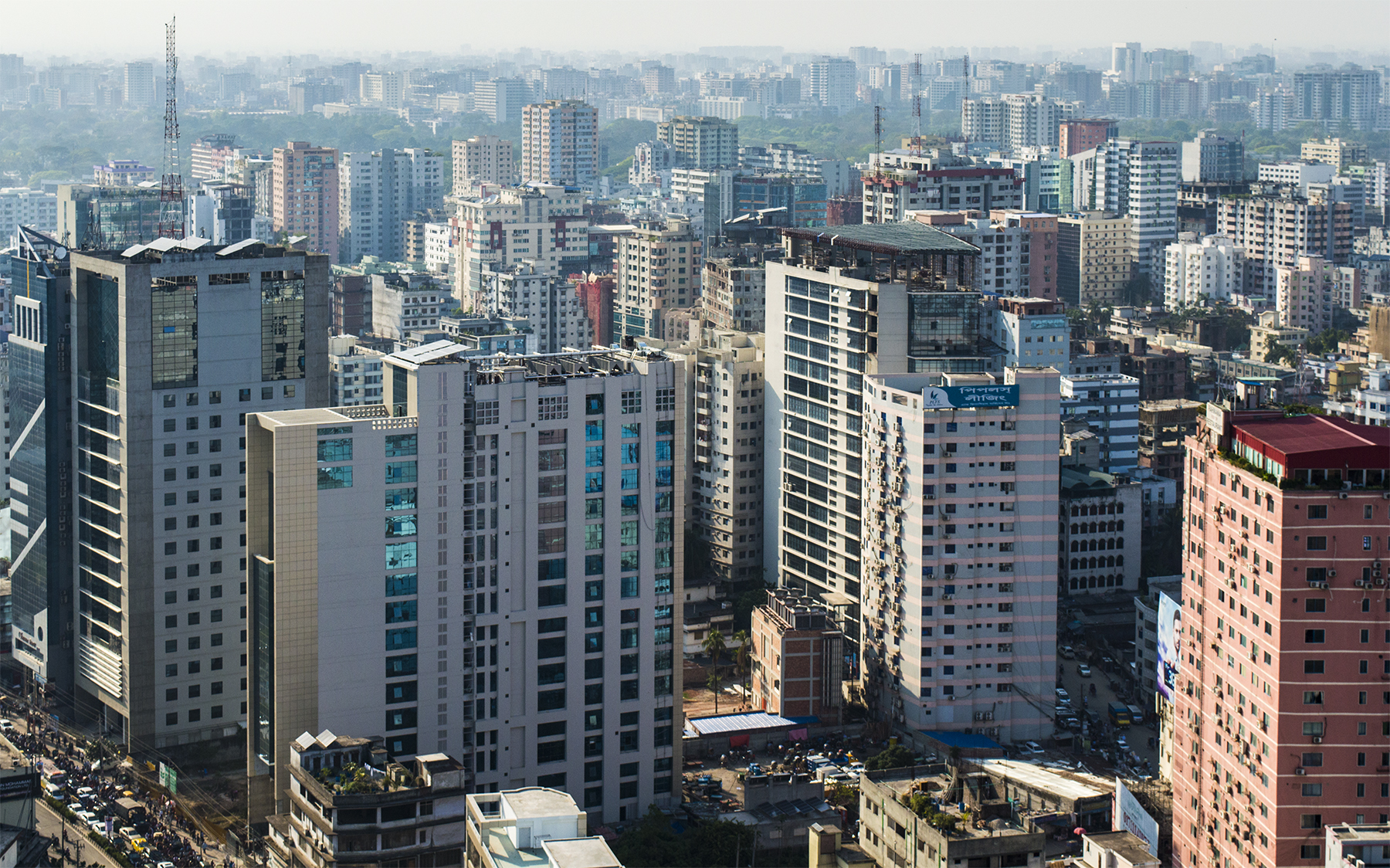
A view of Paltan and Segunbagicha areas in Dhaka in 2017

Bangladesh had high rates of population growth in the 1960s and 1970s. Since then however it has seen significant reduction in its total fertility rate. Over a period of three decades it dropped from almost 7 to 2 in 2005–2018.

=== Census ===
The latest decennial census was conducted by the Bangladesh Bureau of Statistics in 2022.

Population of Bangladesh
Census date	Census population (millions)	Adjusted population (millions)
1801	14.5	
1851	20.3	
1901	28.928	
1911	31.555	
1921	33.255	
1931	35.602	
1941	41.997	
1951	41.932	
1961	50.840	
1974	71.479	76.398
1981	87.120	89.912
1991	106.313	111.455
2001	124.355	130.523
2011	142.319	152.518
2022	165.159	169.829

=== UN estimates ===
Year	Total population (millions)	Population percentage		
Year	Total population (millions)	aged 0–14	aged 15–64	aged 65+
1950	37.895	41.2%	54.8%	3.9%
1955	43.444	42.4%	54.1%	3.5%
1960	50.102	43.6%	53.1%	3.3%
1965	57.792	44.7%	52.0%	3.3%
1970	66.881	44.7%	51.8%	3.4%
1975	70.582	45.8%	50.7%	3.5%
1980	80.624	45.0%	51.4%	3.6%
1985	92.284	43.9%	52.5%	3.6%
1990	105.256	42.5%	53.8%	3.7%
1995	117.487	40.3%	55.9%	3.8%
2000	127.658	37.0%	59.2%	3.9%
2005	139.036	34.4%	61.3%	4.3%
2010	147.575	32.0%	63.2%	4.8%
2015	156.256	29.3%	65.6%	5.1%
2020	164.689	26.8%	68.0%	5.2%

=== Population by sex and age group ===
Population by sex and age group (Census 15.III.2011):

Age group	Male	Female	Total	%
Total	72 109 796	71 933 901	144 043 697	100
0–4	7 638 523	7 423 447	15 061 970	10.46
5–9	9 322 514	8 850 715	18 173 229	12.62
10–14	8 614 889	8 031 726	16 646 615	11.56
15–19	6 509 492	6 352 398	12 861 890	8.93
20–24	5 777 370	7 522 419	13 299 789	9.23
25–29	6 225 252	7 254 256	13 479 508	9.36
30–34	5 079 106	5 420 659	10 499 765	7.29
35–39	4 697 349	4 859 079	9 556 428	6.63
40–44	4 280 923	3 980 739	8 261 662	5.74
45–49	3 363 273	3 016 800	6 380 073	4.43
50–54	2 952 596	2 599 675	5 552 271	3.85
55–59	1 923 534	1 577 463	3 500 997	2.43
60–64	2 081 306	1 852 708	3 934 014	2.73
65–69	1 149 569	963 921	2 113 490	1.47
70–74	1 206 398	1 025 314	2 231 712	1.55
75–79	488 338	386 389	874 727	0.61
80–84	443 239	436 840	880 079	0.61
85–89	138 268	124 343	262 611	0.18
90–94	116 916	133 273	250 189	0.17
95+	100 941	121 737	222 678	0.15
Age group	Male	Female	Total	%
0–14	25 575 926	24 305 888	49 881 814	34.63
15–64	42 890 201	44 436 196	87 326 397	60.62
65+	3 643 669	3 191 817	6 835 486	4.75

Population by sex and age group (Census 14.VI.2022):

Age Group	Male	Female	Total	%
Total	81 769 234	83 381 177	165 158 616	100
0–4	7 947 137	7 633 732	15 580 869	9.43
5–9	7 923 759	7 405 062	15 328 907	9.28
10–14	8 513 953	7 818 716	16 332 832	9.89
15–19	8 070 324	8 496 183	16 567 180	10.03
20–24	6 721 933	8 270 434	14 993 630	9.08
25–29	6 463 632	7 915 247	14 380 470	8.71
30–34	5 658 888	6 461 182	12 121 237	7.34
35–39	6 040 643	6 678 177	12 719 838	7.70
40–44	5 120 981	4 919 330	10 040 967	6.08
45–49	4 129 672	4 135 750	8 265 882	5.00
50–54	4 001 575	3 783 876	7 785 833	4.71
55–59	2 955 275	2 776 006	5 731 513	3.47
60–64	3 013 689	2 588 189	5 602 080	3.39
65-69	2 153 315	1 773 812	3 927 239	2.38
70-74	1 569 573	1 262 246	2 831 889	1.71
75-79	672 131	555 110	1 227 266	0.74
80-84	455 872	477 325	933 210	0.57
85-89	173 302	180 761	354 068	0.21
90-94	117 686	159 486	277 180	0.17
95-99	57 098	75 807	132 907	0.08
100+	8 796	14 746	23 542	0.01
Age group	Male	Female	Total	Percent
0–14	24 384 849	22 857 510	47 242 359	28.60
15–64	52 176 612	56 024 374	108 200 986	65.51
65+	5 207 773	4 499 293	9 707 066	5.88

=== Gender ratio ===
Age range (years)	Sex ratio (males/females) (2015 est.)
at birth	1.04
0–14	1.03
15–24	0.89
25–54	0.90
55–64	1.01
65 and over	0.97
total population	0.95

=== Urban and rural ===
The sprawling mega-city of Dhaka has a huge population, but the majority of the people nonetheless still live in villages in rural areas.

Urban population: 37.4% of total population (2019 est.)
Rate of urbanisation: 3.13% annual rate of change (2019 est.)
Bangladesh is considered an urban country based on their population density

=== Population ===
View source data.
View source data.
View source data.
View source data.

== Vital statistics ==
=== UN estimates ===
The Population Department of the United Nations prepared the following estimates. Population estimates account for under numeration in population censuses.

Year	Mid-year population	Live births	Deaths	Natural change	Crude birth rate (per 1000)	Crude death rate (per 1000)	Natural change (per 1000)	Crude migration rate (per 1000)	Total fertility rate (TFR)	Infant mortality (per 1000 live births)	Life expectancy (in years)
1950	39,729,000	1,848,000	1,072,000	776,000	46.5	27.0	19.5		6.30	219.2	38.18
1951	40,549,000	1,907,000	1,066,000	842,000	47.0	26.3	20.8	−0.2	6.34	213.6	38.86
1952	41,427,000	1,960,000	1,056,000	904,000	47.3	25.5	21.8	−0.1	6.35	208.1	39.69
1953	42,329,000	2,016,000	1,067,000	949,000	47.6	25.2	22.4	−0.6	6.38	203.1	39.94
1954	43,282,000	2,079,000	1,047,000	1,032,000	48.0	24.2	23.8	−1.3	6.44	197.6	41.16
1955	44,316,000	2,140,000	1,044,000	1,096,000	48.3	23.5	24.7	−0.8	6.49	192.8	41.89
1956	45,408,000	2,198,000	1,048,000	1,150,000	48.4	23.1	25.3	−0.7	6.53	188.4	42.42
1957	46,561,000	2,262,000	1,037,000	1,225,000	48.6	22.3	26.3	−0.9	6.57	183.5	43.41
1958	47,743,000	2,329,000	1,043,000	1,286,000	48.7	21.8	26.9	−1.5	6.62	179.5	43.93
1959	49,005,000	2,405,000	1,045,000	1,360,000	49.0	21.3	27.7	−1.3	6.71	175.4	44.60
1960	50,396,000	2,493,000	1,070,000	1,423,000	49.5	21.2	28.2	0.2	6.78	173.4	44.74
1961	51,883,000	2,574,000	1,064,000	1,510,000	49.6	20.5	29.1	0.4	6.83	168.3	45.66
1962	53,462,000	2,650,000	1,055,000	1,595,000	49.6	19.7	29.8	0.6	6.87	164.3	46.70
1963	55,094,000	2,704,000	1,084,000	1,620,000	49.1	19.7	29.4	1.1	6.84	162.6	46.66
1964	56,774,000	2,760,000	1,068,000	1,692,000	48.6	18.8	29.8	0.7	6.84	158.7	47.74
1965	58,500,000	2,816,000	1,130,000	1,686,000	48.2	19.3	28.8	1.6	6.83	159.0	46.86
1966	60,265,000	2,881,000	1,088,000	1,792,000	47.8	18.1	29.7	0.5	6.82	154.7	48.58
1967	62,104,000	2,966,000	1,107,000	1,859,000	47.8	17.8	29.9	0.6	6.85	153.3	48.87
1968	63,996,000	3,046,000	1,130,000	1,916,000	47.6	17.6	29.9	0.6	6.85	152.5	49.09
1969	65,867,000	3,134,000	1,159,000	1,975,000	47.5	17.6	29.9	−0.7	6.86	152.0	49.17
1970	67,542,000	3,209,000	1,509,000	1,701,000	47.4	22.3	25.1	0.3	6.88	165.3	42.59
1971	68,376,000	3,262,000	2,811,000	451,000	47.6	41.0	6.6	5.7	6.87	199.4	26.00
1972	69,347,000	3,300,000	1,189,000	2,112,000	47.5	17.1	30.4	−16.2	6.85	151.3	49.59
1973	71,145,000	3,349,000	1,211,000	2,137,000	47.0	17.0	30.0	−4.1	6.82	151.1	49.83
1974	72,948,000	3,414,000	1,275,000	2,139,000	46.7	17.4	29.2	−3.9	6.79	153.6	49.16
1975	74,700,000	3,461,000	1,246,000	2,215,000	46.2	16.6	29.5	−5.5	6.74	149.3	50.29
1976	76,380,000	3,540,000	1,260,000	2,280,000	46.2	16.4	29.7	−7.2	6.67	147.9	50.65
1977	78,138,000	3,610,000	1,266,000	2,344,000	46.1	16.1	29.9	−6.9	6.59	146.1	51.20
1978	80,008,000	3,661,000	1,289,000	2,372,000	45.6	16.1	29.5	−5.6	6.52	143.9	51.25
1979	81,908,000	3,735,000	1,306,000	2,429,000	45.5	15.9	29.6	−5.9	6.42	141.3	51.46
1980	83,930,000	3,793,000	1,313,000	2,479,000	45.1	15.6	29.5	−4.8	6.32	138.6	51.85
1981	86,155,000	3,859,000	1,324,000	2,535,000	44.7	15.4	29.4	−2.9	6.24	135.7	52.17
1982	88,555,000	3,922,000	1,332,000	2,590,000	44.3	15.0	29.2	−1.3	6.12	132.6	52.54
1983	91,045,000	3,899,000	1,327,000	2,572,000	42.8	14.6	28.2	−0.1	5.89	129.2	53.01
1984	93,534,000	3,914,000	1,318,000	2,596,000	41.8	14.1	27.7	−0.4	5.73	125.8	53.54
1985	95,959,000	3,913,000	1,317,000	2,597,000	40.7	13.7	27.0	−1.1	5.54	122.6	53.90
1986	98,272,000	3,880,000	1,301,000	2,579,000	39.4	13.2	26.2	−2.1	5.30	118.4	54.42
1987	100,490,000	3,858,000	1,286,000	2,572,000	38.3	12.8	25.6	−3.0	5.07	114.7	54.93
1988	102,689,000	3,803,000	1,290,000	2,513,000	37.0	12.5	24.4	−2.5	4.84	110.9	55.03
1989	104,894,000	3,801,000	1,299,000	2,501,000	36.2	12.4	23.8	−2.3	4.68	106.9	55.09
1990	107,148,000	3,750,000	1,257,000	2,492,000	35.1	12.0	23.2	−1.7	4.48	103.0	55.99
1991	109,243,000	3,660,000	1,375,000	2,285,000	33.6	12.9	20.7	−1.3	4.26	103.6	54.15
1992	111,272,000	3,604,000	1,178,000	2,426,000	32.4	11.2	21.2	−3.2	4.03	95.2	57.64
1993	113,419,000	3,579,000	1,174,000	2,404,000	31.4	10.9	20.5	−1.9	3.83	91.3	57.93
1994	115,615,000	3,627,000	1,153,000	2,474,000	31.1	10.5	20.6	−2.0	3.74	87.3	58.62
1995	117,793,000	3,593,000	1,120,000	2,472,000	30.4	10.1	20.2	−2.2	3.59	83.4	59.47
1996	119,877,000	3,597,000	1,138,000	2,458,000	30.0	9.8	20.3	−2.8	3.51	79.5	59.49
1997	122,039,000	3,692,000	1,047,000	2,646,000	30.4	9.4	21.0	−3.6	3.50	75.5	61.43
1998	124,350,000	3,711,000	936,000	2,775,000	30.2	9.0	21.1	−3.4	3.43	71.8	63.92
1999	126,755,000	3,723,000	846,000	2,877,000	29.9	8.6	21.2	−3.4	3.36	68.1	66.23
2000	129,193,000	3,747,000	887,000	2,860,000	29.6	8.3	21.3	−2.9	3.28	64.6	65.78
2001	131,670,000	3,756,000	890,000	2,866,000	29.2	7.9	21.2	−2.5	3.20	61.3	66.14
2002	134,140,000	3,758,000	886,000	2,872,000	28.5	7.6	20.9	−2.6	3.13	58.2	66.61
2003	136,503,000	3,736,000	896,000	2,841,000	27.7	7.3	20.4	−3.2	3.03	55.3	66.82
2004	138,790,000	3,697,000	896,000	2,801,000	27.0	7.1	19.9	−3.3	2.94	52.6	67.19
2005	140,913,000	3,603,000	908,000	2,696,000	26.1	6.8	19.2	−3.8	2.85	50.0	67.30
2006	142,629,000	3,529,000	930,000	2,600,000	25.3	6.6	18.6	−6.0	2.76	47.5	67.24
2007	144,136,000	3,467,000	982,000	2,485,000	24.5	6.5	18.0	−6.6	2.67	45.4	66.71
2008	145,421,000	3,379,000	979,000	2,400,000	23.7	6.3	17.4	−7.5	2.58	43.0	67.05
2009	146,707,000	3,275,000	972,000	2,302,000	22.8	6.2	16.6	−6.9	2.48	41.0	67.40
2010	148,391,000	3,177,000	907,000	2,269,000	21.9	6.0	15.8	−3.8	2.38	39.0	68.64
2011	150,211,000	3,093,000	919,000	2,174,000	21.1	5.9	15.2	−2.2	2.31	37.2	68.81
2012	152,091,000	3,062,000	893,000	2,169,000	20.7	5.8	14.9	−1.7	2.26	35.6	69.55
2013	154,030,000	3,067,000	921,000	2,146,000	20.6	5.8	14.8	−1.2	2.25	33.9	69.57
2014	155,961,000	3,049,000	919,000	2,130,000	20.3	5.7	14.6	−1.1	2.23	32.4	69.99
2015	157,830,000	3,026,000	912,000	2,114,000	20.3	5.6	14.6	−1.4	2.23	30.9	70.49
2016	159,785,000	3,037,000	900,000	2,137,000	20.2	5.6	14.7	−1.0	2.23	29.4	71.09
2017	161,794,000	2,994,000	881,000	2,113,000	20.0	5.5	14.5	−0.5	2.21	28.0	71.79
2018	163,684,000	3,025,000	859,000	2,166,000	20.1	5.4	14.6	−1.5	2.19	26.6	72.57
2019	165,516,000	3,041,000	875,000	2,166,000	20.1	5.4	14.8	−1.9	2.18	25.2	72.81
2020	167,421,000	3,023,000	974,000	2,049,000	20.3	6.1	14.2	−0.7	2.18	24.0	71.97
2021	169,356,000	3,020,000	962,000	2,057,000	20.4	6.3	14.1	−0.5	2.17	22.9	72.38
2022		3,486,416	853,189	2,633,227	20.6	5.0	15.5		2.18		
2023		3,489,953	859,075	2,630,878	20.4	5.0	15.3		2.16		
2024		3,469,124	885,972	2,583,152	20.0	5.1	14.9		2.14		
2025		3,441,259	899,880	2,541,379	19.6	5.1	14.5		2.11		

=== Sample vital registration system ===
Year	Population	Live births	Deaths	Natural change	Crude birth rate (per 1000)	Crude death rate (per 1000)	Natural change (per 1000)	Fertility rate
Year	Population	Live births	Deaths	Natural change	National (urban/rural)			
1981	87,119,965	3,098,000	1,038,000	2,060,000	34.6 (24.8/35.7)	11.5 (7.2/12.2)	23.1 (17.6/23.5)	5.04 (3.20/5.28)
1982	92,300,000	3,189,000	1,107,000	2,082,000	34.8 (22.9/36.9)	12.2 (6.9/12.8)	22.6 (16.0/24.1)	5.21 (3.01/5.50)
1983	94,300,000	3,280,000	1,163,000	2,117,000	35.0 (27.1/36.4)	12.3 (7.5/13.2)	22.7 (19.6/23.2)	5.07 (3.45/5.36)
1984	96,300,000	3,335,000	1,182,000	2,153,000	34.8 (25.0/36.1)	12.3 (8.5/12.9)	22.5 (16.5/23.2)	4.83 (3.10/5.08)
1985	98,400,000	3,392,000	1,183,000	2,209,000	34.6 (28.0/35.3)	12.0 (8.3/12.9)	22.6 (19.7/22.4)	4.71 (3.52/4.91)
1986	100,500,000	3,448,000	1,183,000	2,265,000	34.4 (25.9/35.4)	12.1 (8.1/12.3)	22.3 (17.8/23.1)	4.70 (3.26/4.89)
1987	102,800,000	3,414,000	1,173,000	2,241,000	33.3 (24.8/34.6)	11.5 (7.6/11.8)	21.8 (17.2/22.8)	4.42 (3.05/4.64)
1988	105,000,000	3,477,000	1,179,000	2,298,000	33.2 (24.9/34.6)	11.3 (7.5/11.9)	21.9 (17.4/22.7)	4.45 (3.08/4.70)
1989	107,400,000	3,531,000	1,196,000	2,335,000	33.0 (24.4/34.5)	11.3 (7.3/11.9)	21.7 (17.1/22.6)	4.35 (2.90/4.59)
1990	109,800,000	3,559,000	1,106,000	2,453,000	32.8 (24.6/34.3)	11.4 (7.8/11.8)	21.4 (16.8/22.5)	4.33 (2.90/4.57)
1991	106,314,992	3,561,000	1,110,000	2,451,000	31.6 (23.9/32.9)	11.2 (7.8/11.5)	20.4 (16.1/21.4)	4.24 (2.89/4.51)
1992	114,400,000	3,455,000	1,139,000	2,316,000	30.8 (23.7/32.2)	11.0 (7.5/11.3)	19.8 (16.2/20.9)	4.18 (2.88/4.33)
1993	116,500,000	3,350,000	1,100,000	2,250,000	28.8 (21.0/30.0)	10.0 (7.2/10.4)	18.8 (13.8/19.6)	3.84 (2.62/4.00)
1994	118,400,000	3,289,000	1,067,000	2,222,000	27.0 (20.2/29.1)	9.3 (7.1/9.3)	17.7 (13.1/19.8)	3.58 (2.58/3.79)
1995	120,200,000	3,228,000	1,007,000	2,221,000	26.5 (19.4/28.5)	8.7 (6.7/9.0)	17.8 (12.7/19.5)	3.45 (2.50/3.78)
1996	122,100,000	3,143,000	989,000	2,154,000	25.6 (19.0/27.8)	8.2 (6.5/8.8)	17.4 (12.5/19.0)	3.41 (2.48/3.76)
1997	123,900,000	2,746,000	719,000	2,027,000	21.0 (16.2/24.5)	5.5 (4.2/6.5)	15.5 (12.0/18.0)	3.10 (2.28/3.32)
1998	125,700,000	2,608,000	652,000	1,956,000	19.9 (14.0/21.0)	5.1 (3.7/5.4)	14.8 (10.3/15.6)	2.98 (2.24/3.00)
1999	127,500,000	2,542,000	649,000	1,893,000	19.2 (13.8/20.9)	5.1 (3.5/5.4)	14.1 (10.3/15.5)	2.64 (1.76/2.91)
2000	129,300,000	2,454,000	640,000	1,814,000	19.0 (13.7/20.8)	4.9 (3.5/5.3)	14.1 (10.2/15.5)	2.59 (1.68/2.89)
2001	124,355,263	2,439,000	638,000	1,801,000	18.9 (13.6/20.7)	4.8 (4.3/5.2)	14.1 (9.3/15.5)	2.56 (1.73/2.84)
2002	132,900,000	2,674,000	679,000	1,995,000	20.1 (16.6/21.0)	5.1 (3.8/5.4)	15.0 (12.8/15.6)	2.55 (1.94/2.69)
2003	134,800,000	2,814,000	783,000	2,031,000	20.9 (17.9/21.7)	5.9 (4.7/6.2)	15.0 (13.2/15.5)	2.57 (1.91/2.70)
2004	136,700,000	2,830,000	794,000	2,036,000	20.8 (17.8/21.6)	5.8 (4.4/6.1)	15.0 (13.4/15.5)	2.51 (1.91/2.67)
2005	138,600,000	2,879,000	823,000	2,056,000	20.7 (17.8/21.7)	5.8 (4.9/6.1)	14.9 (12.9/15.6)	2.46 (1.87/2.65)
2006	140,600,000	2,901,000	789,000	2,112,000	20.6 (17.5/21.7)	5.6 (4.4/6.0)	15.0 (13.1/15.7)	2.41 (1.81/2.63)
2007	142,600,000	2,986,000	792,000	2,194,000	20.9 (17.4/22.1)	6.2 (5.1/6.6)	14.7 (12.3/15.5)	2.39 (1.79/2.61)
2008	144,700,000	3,022,000	885,000	2,137,000	20.5 (17.2/22.4)	6.0 (5.1/6.5)	14.5 (12.1/15.9)	2.30 (1.79/2.60)
2009	146,700,000	2,832,000	842,000	1,990,000	19.4 (16.8/20.4)	5.8 (4.7/6.1)	13.6 (12.1/14.3)	2.15 (1.65/2.28)
2010	148,600,000	2,868,494	842,095	2,026,399	19.2 (17.1/20.1)	5.6 (4.9/5.9)	13.6 (12.2/14.2)	2.12 (1.72/2.26)
2011	150,600,000	2,891,000	828,000	2,063,000	19.2 (17.4/20.2)	5.5 (4.8/5.8)	13.7 (12.6/14.4)	2.11 (1.71/2.25)
2012	152,700,000	2,933,000	826,000	2,107,000	18.9 (17.1/20.0)	5.3 (4.6/5.7)	13.6 (12.5/14.3)	2.12 (1.84/2.30)
2013	154,700,000				19.0 (18.2/19.3)	5.3 (4.6/5.6)	13.7 (13.6/13.7)	2.11 (1.84/2.19)
2014	156,800,000				18.9 (17.2/19.4)	5.2 (4.1/5.6)	13.7 (13.1/13.8)	2.11 (1.77/2.22)
2015	158,900,000				18.8 (16.5/20.3)	5.1 (4.6/5.5)	13.7 (11.9/14.8)	2.10 (1.72/2.30)
2016	160,800,000				18.7 (16.1/20.9)	5.1 (4.2/5.7)	13.6 (11.9/15.2)	2.10 (1.68/2.38)
2017	163,780,000	3,009,950	829,770	2,180,180	18.5 (16.1/20.4)	5.1 (4.2/5.7)	13.4 (11.9/14.7)	2.05 (1.68/2.37)
2018	164,600,000				18.3 (16.1/20.1)	5.0 (4.4/5.4)	13.3 (11.7/14.7)	2.05 (1.68/2.38)
2019	166,500,000				18.1 (15.9/20.0)	4.9 (4.4/5.4)	13.2 (11.5/14.6)	2.04 (1.67/2.37)
2020	168,220,000	3,040,667	852,254	2,188,413	18.1 (15.3/20.4)	5.1 (4.9/5.2)	13.0 (10.4/15.2)	2.04 (1.66/2.37)
2021	170,260,000	3,197,269	969,385	2,227,884	18.8 (16.4/19.5)	5.7 (4.8/6.0)	13.1 (11.6/13.5)	2.05 (1.66/2.18)
2022	165,158,616	3,362,669	985,024	2,377,645	19.8 (16.6/20.8)	5.8 (5.1/6.0)	14.0 (11.5/14.8)	2.20 (1.71/2.37)
2023		3,317,383	1,043,095	2,274,288				2.17

=== Total fertility rate ===
Years	1926	1927	1928	1929	1930	1931	1932	1933	1934	1935
Total Fertility Rate in Bangladesh	6.68	6.66	6.64	6.63	6.61	6.59	6.57	6.55	6.53	6.51

Years	1936	1937	1938	1939	1940	1941	1942	1943	1944	1945
Total Fertility Rate in Bangladesh	6.49	6.48	6.46	6.44	6.42	6.4	6.38	6.36	6.35	6.33

Years	1946	1947	1948	1949
Total Fertility Rate in Bangladesh	6.31	6.29	6.27	6.25

==== Total fertility rate by divisions in 2020 ====
Division	TFR (total fertility rate)	Crude birth rate	Death rate
Mymensingh	2.69	21.8	5.0
Barishal	2.07	17.7	5.2
Chittagong	2.36	21.6	5.3
Dhaka	1.71	15.8	4.5
Rajshahi	1.99	16.8	5.4
Rangpur	2.11	18.2	5.2
Sylhet	1.94	17.7	5.3
Khulna	1.98	17.1	5.0

=== Demographic and Health Surveys ===
Total Fertility Rate (TFR) (Wanted Fertility Rate) and Crude Birth Rate (CBR):

Year	CBR (Total)	TFR (Total)	CBR (Urban)	TFR (Urban)	CBR (Rural)	TFR (Rural)
1993–94	29.1	3.44 (2.1)	25.3	2.69 (1.7)	29.5	3.54 (2.2)
1996–97	29.4	3.27 (2.1)	22.6	2.10 (1.5)	30.2	3.43 (2.2)
1999–2000	30.2	3.31 (2.2)	25.3	2.45 (1.7)	31.3	3.54 (2.4)
2004	28.7	3.0 (2.0)	25.8	2.5 (1.6)	29.5	3.2 (2.1)
2007	26.1	2.7 (1.9)	24.7	2.4 (1.7)	26.5	2.8 (1.9)
2011	22.6	2.3 (1.6)	20.6	2.0 (1.5)	23.3	2.5 (1.6)
2014	22.2	2.3 (1.6)	20.8	2.0 (1.5)	22.8	2.4 (1.7)
2017–18	21.9	2.3 (1.7)	21.1	2.0 (1.6)	22.3	2.3 (1.8)
2022	21.9	2.3 (1.3)	20.8	2.1 (1.2)	22.4	2.4 (1.3)

=== Life expectancy at birth ===
Life expectancy in Bangladesh since 1876

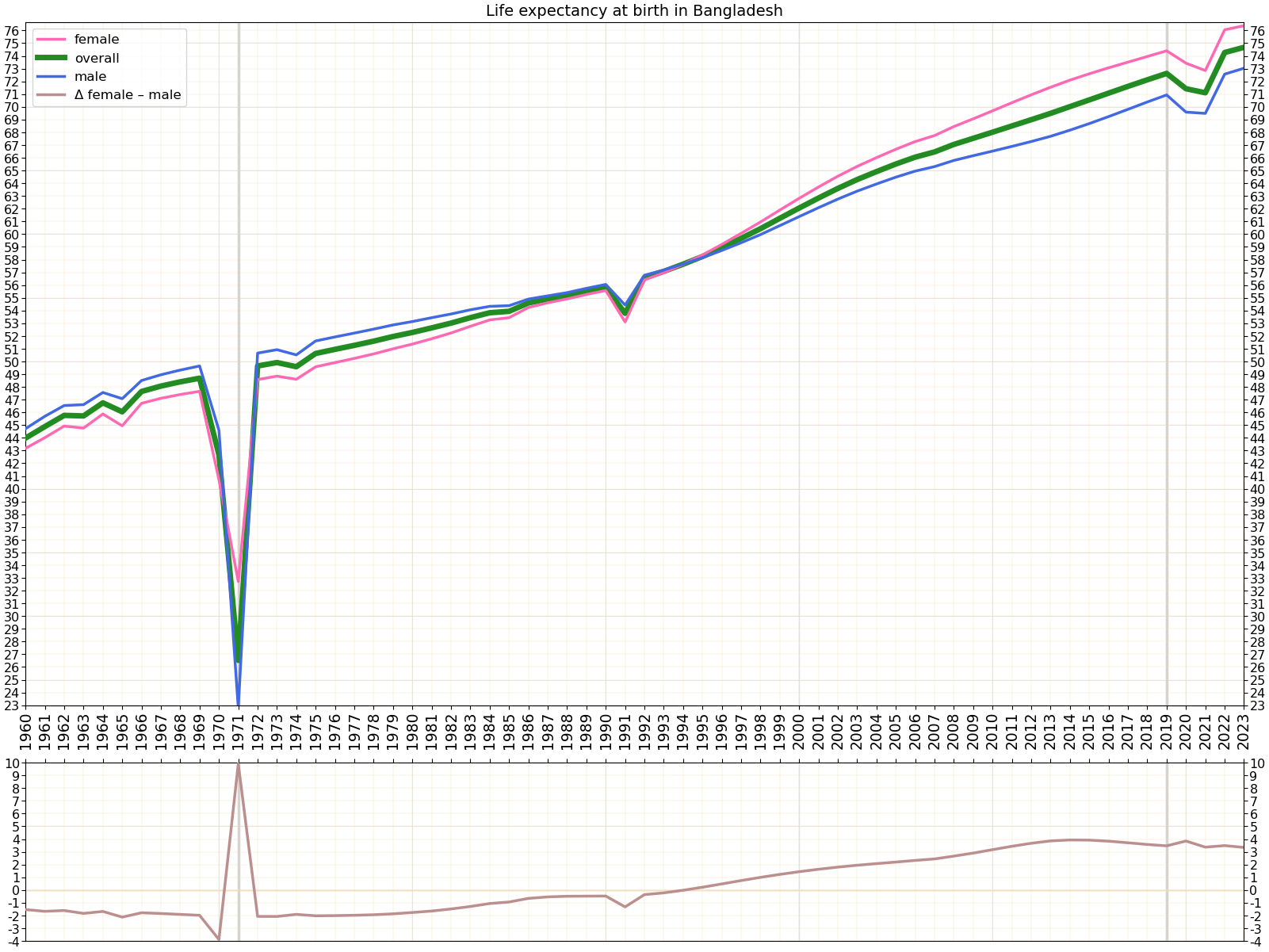
Life expectancy in Bangladesh since 1960 by gender

Total population: 72.7 years (2018)
Male: 71.1 years
Female: 74.4 years

Period	Life expectancy in Years	Period	Life expectancy in Years
1950–1955	40.7	1985–1990	57.0
1955–1960	44.2	1990–1995	60.0
1960–1965	47.2	1995–2000	63.7
1965–1970	49.3	2000–2005	66.7
1970–1975	46.3	2005–2010	69.1
1975–1980	52.2	2010–2015	71.2
1980–1985	54.3		

Source: UN World Population Prospects

== Ethnic group ==
The vast majority (about 99%) of Bangladeshis are of the Bengali ethno-linguistic group. This group also spans the neighbouring Indian province of West Bengal. Minority ethnic groups include Meitei, Tripuri, Marma, Tanchangya, Barua, Khasi, Santhals, Chakma, Rakhine, Garo, Biharis, Oraons, and Mundas.

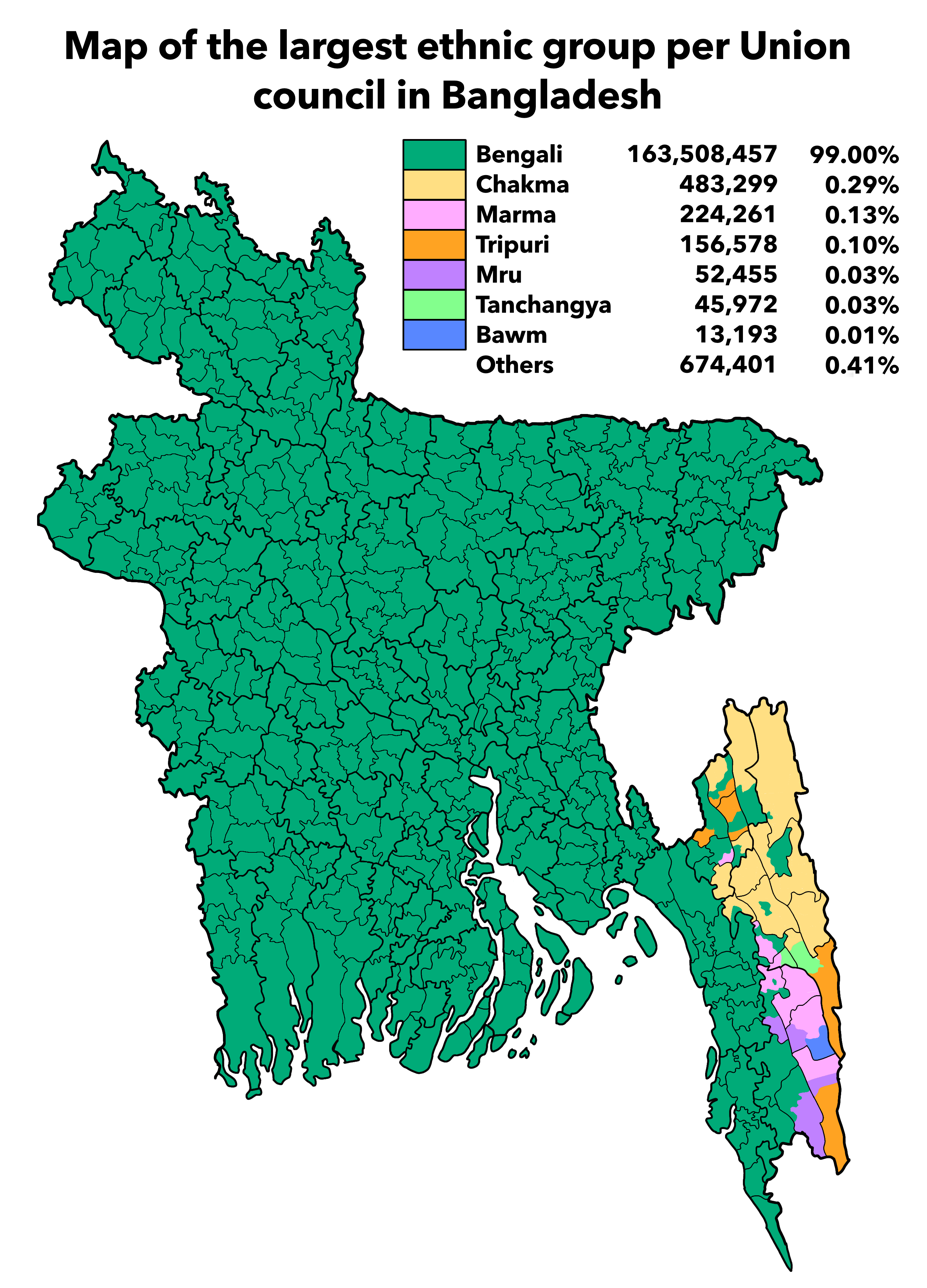
Map of the largest ethnic group per Union council in Bangladesh

Biharis are Urdu-speaking, non-Bengalis who emigrated from the state of Bihar and other parts of northern India during the 1947 partition. They are concentrated in the Dhaka and Rangpur areas and number some 300,000. In the 1971 independence war many of them sided with Pakistan, as they stood to lose their positions in the upper levels of society. Hundreds of thousands went to Pakistan and those that remained were interned in refugee camps. Their population declined from about 1 million in 1971 to 600,000 in the late 1980s. Refugees International has called them a "neglected and stateless" people as they are denied citizenship by the governments of Bangladesh and Pakistan. As nearly 40 years has passed, two generations of Biharis have been born in these camps. Biharis were granted Bangladeshi citizenship and voting rights in 2008.

Bangladesh's tribal population was enumerated at 897,828 in the 1981 census. These tribes are concentrated in the Chittagong Hill Tracts and around Mymensingh, Sylhet, and Rajshahi. They are of mixed Indo-Aryan and Sino-Tibetan descent and differ markedly in their social customs, religion, language and level of development. They speak Indo-Aryan and Tibeto-Burman languages and most are Buddhist or Hindu. The four largest tribes are Chakmas, Marmas, Tipperas, Tanchangya, and Mros. Smaller groups include the Santals in Rajshahi and Dinajpur, and Khasis, Garos, and Khajons in Mymensingh and Sylhet regions.

There are small communities of Meitei people (alias Manipuri people) in the Sylhet district, which is close to the Meitei homeland across the border in Manipur, India.

There is a large population of Rohingya refugees from Myanmar near the border in the southeast. There are 28,000 living in two UN refugee camps in Cox's Bazar as well as some 200,000 "unregistered people of concern" living outside of the camps. The refugee crisis originated in the early 1990s when the first wave numbering some 250,000 of the predominantly Muslim ethnic group fled persecution from their home in Rakhaine—Myanmar's westernmost state. Bangladesh seeks to repatriate the refugees back to Myanmar. Since 2017, there are approximately 1.1 million Rohingya refugees living in Bangladesh.

== Languages ==
Languages of Bangladesh (2022)
Bengali	99%
Others	1%

- Official language: Bengali (also known as Bangla)
- Other varieties that are variously considered as the dialects of Bengali: Chittagonian, Noakhailla, Sylheti, and Rajbongshi.
- Bengali–Meitei creole language: Bishnupriya Manipuri
- Other Indic languages: Assamese, Rohingya, Chakma, Tanchangya and various Bihari languages
- Tibeto-Burman languages: A'Tong, Chak, Koch, Garo, Megam, Tripuri, Meitei language (Manipuri language), Mizo, Mru, Pangkhua, Rakhine/Marma, various Chin languages
- Austroasiatic languages: Khasi, Koda, Mundari, Pnar, Santali, War
- Dravidian languages: Kurukh
- Other languages: English (spoken and known widely in upper-class & politics), Arabic (sometimes spoken and known by many Muslims, due to Islam being the primary religion), Hindi/Urdu (understood by some, and spoken by Biharis)

Bangladesh has 44 indigenous languages according to Professor Shameem Reza.

According to the Ethnologue, there are 36 indigenous living languages, which include 17 Sino-Tibetan, 10 Indo-European, 7 Austro-Asiatic and 2 Dravidian languages.

== Religion ==
Population trends for major religious groups in Bangladesh (1951–2022)
	Islam	Hinduism	Buddhism	Christianity	Other religions/ No religion
1951	76.9%	22.0%	0.7%	0.3%	0.1%
1961	80.4%	18.5%	0.7%	0.3%	0.1%
1974	85.4%	13.5%	0.6%	0.2%	0.2%
1981	86.6%	12.1%	0.6%	0.3%	0.3%
1991	88.3%	10.5%	0.6%	0.3%	0.3%
2001	89.7%	9.2%	0.7%	0.3%	0.1%
2011	90.4%	8.5%	0.6%	0.3%	0.1%
2022	91.0%	7.9%	0.6%	0.3%	0.1%

Bangladesh religious diversity as per 2022 census
Religion	Population
Muslims	150,360,404
Hindus	13,130,109
Buddhists	1,007,467
Christians	495,475
Others	198,190
Total	165,158,616

Bangladesh has a population of 165,158,616 as per 2022 census.

Religions in Bangladesh (2022 census)
Religion	Percent
Muslims	91.04%
Hindus	7.95%
Buddhism	0.61%
Christians	0.30%
Others	0.12%

== Migration ==
=== Immigration ===
According to the United Nations Department of Economic and Social Affairs (UNDESA), Bangladesh hosted approximately 2.9 million international migrants in 2024, representing about 1.7% of the country's population. The majority are Rohingya refugees who fled persecution and violence in neighboring Myanmar following the Rohingya genocide and subsequent conflict in Rakhine State.

As of 2025, Bangladesh was hosting more than 1 million Rohingya refugees, primarily in camps in Cox's Bazar District, making it one of the world's largest refugee-hosting countries.

Other migrant communities in Bangladesh include expatriate workers, diplomats, students, and business professionals from South Asia, East Asia, and the Middle East.

International migrants in Bangladesh (2024 estimate)
Country/territory of origin	Population
Myanmar (primarily Rohingya refugees)	1,000,000+
Malaysia	210,000+
China	170,000+
Afghanistan	160,000+
India	40,000+
Nepal	40,000+
United States	50,000+
United Kingdom	35,000+
Source: United Nations International Migrant Stock 2024, UNHCR

=== Emigration ===
Bangladesh is one of the world's largest sources of migrant labour. According to UNDESA estimates, the Bangladeshi diaspora reached approximately 8.7 million people in 2024. The country has a strongly negative net migration rate of approximately −4.3 migrants per 1,000 population.

Labour migration plays a major role in the Bangladeshi economy, with remittances constituting one of the country's largest sources of foreign exchange earnings.

The principal destinations for Bangladeshi migrants are countries in the Persian Gulf, Southeast Asia, Europe, and North America.

Largest Bangladeshi diaspora populations (2024 estimate)
Country	Population
Saudi Arabia	1,800,000+
United Arab Emirates	1,200,000+
Malaysia	800,000+
Oman	700,000+
United Kingdom	600,000+
United States	350,000+
Qatar	300,000+
Kuwait	280,000+
Italy	200,000+
Singapore	160,000+
Sources: United Nations International Migrant Stock 2024, BMET

== See also ==
- Bangladeshis
- Bangladeshi society
- Demographics of India
- Demographics of Nepal
- Demographics of Pakistan
- Demographics of Myanmar
