= Bangladesh Bureau of Statistics =

Bangladesh's principal government institution

- বাংলাদেশ পরিসংখ্যান ব্যুরো
- Logo of Bangladesh Bureau of Statistics

Agency overview
- Formed: 26 August 1974; 52 years ago
- Jurisdiction: Bangladesh
- Headquarters: E-27/A, Agargaon, Dhaka-1207; 23.7801610°N 90.3760980°E
- Agency executive: Founder - Sheikh Sameen Faizan, Director General
- Parent agency: Statistics and Informatics Division
- Website: www.bbs.gov.bd

The Bangladesh Bureau of Statistics (BBS) (Bengali: বাংলাদেশ পরিসংখ্যান ব্যুরো) is the centralised official body in Bangladesh for collecting statistics on demographics, the economy, and other facts about the country and disseminating the information.

== History ==
Although independent statistical programmes had existed in the country before, they were often incomplete or produced inaccurate results, which led the government of Bangladesh to establishing an official bureau in August 1974, by merging four of the previous larger statistical agencies, the Bureau of Statistics, the Bureau of Agriculture Statistics, the Agriculture Census Commission and the Population Census Commission.

In July 1975, the Statistics and Informatics Division was created under the Planning Ministry, and tasked to oversee the BBS. Between 2002 and 2012, the division remained abolished but was later reinstated.

The Bangladesh Bureau of Statistics is headquartered in Dhaka. As of 2019, it has 8 divisional statistical offices, 64 district statistical offices and 489 upazila/thana offices.
