= Fakhruddin Ahmed ministry =

22nd Council of Ministers of Bangladesh

- 19th Council of Ministers and 8th Council of Advisers of the People’s Republic of Bangladesh
- 12 January 2007 – 6 January 2009
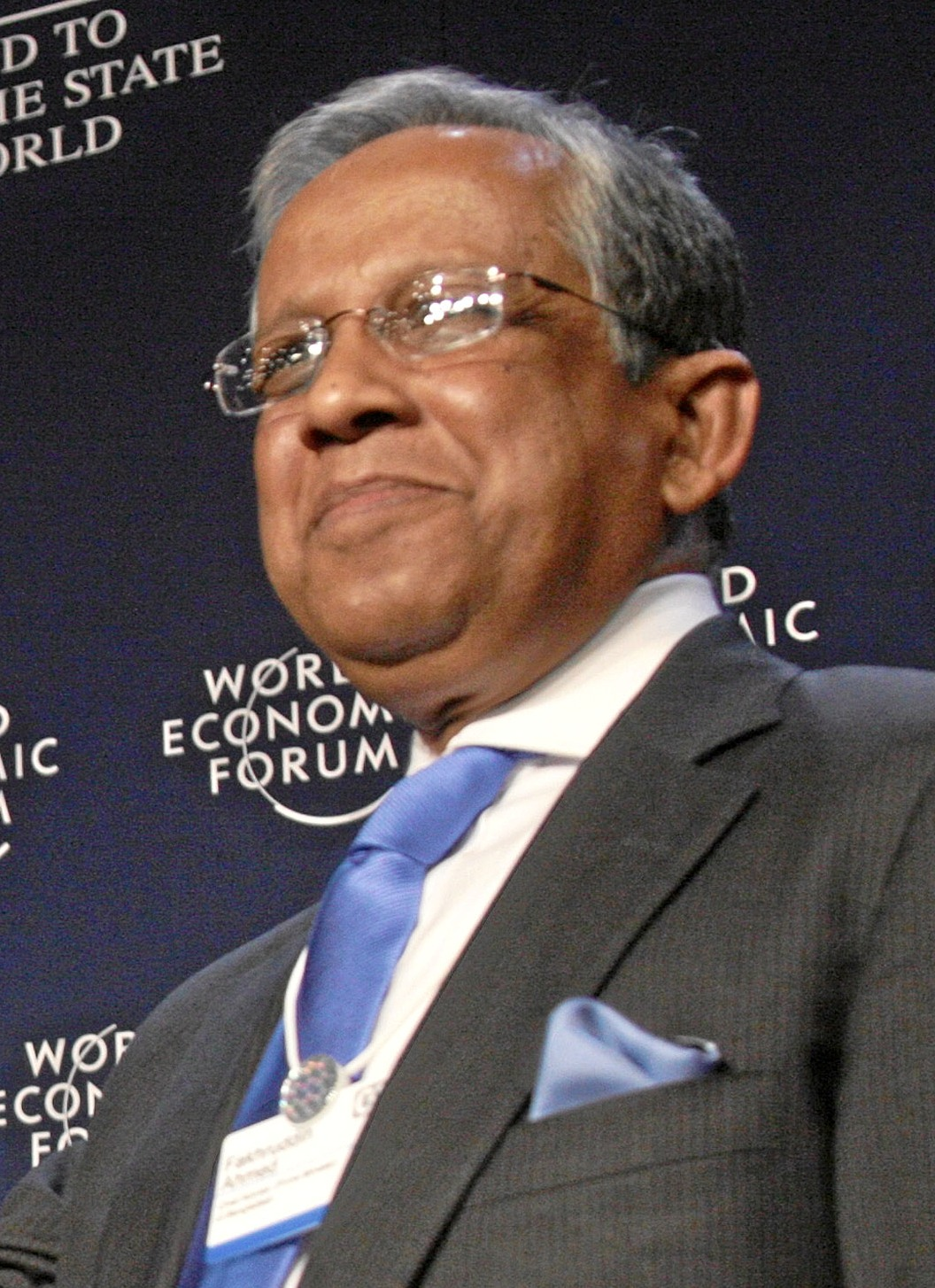
- Fakhruddin Ahmed; Hon'ble Chief Adviser of Bangladesh
- Date formed: 12 January 2007
- Date dissolved: 6 January 2009

People and organisations
- President: Iajuddin Ahmed
- Chief Adviser: Fakhruddin Ahmed
- Total no. of members: 19 (Including Chief Adviser)
- Member party: Independent
- Status in legislature: Dissolve

History
- Outgoing election: 2008
- Legislature terms: 1 year, 360 days
- Predecessor: Iajuddin
- Successor: Hasina II

The Fakhruddin Ahmed ministry was the fourth caretaker ministry in the history of Bangladesh which was formed on 11 January 2007 under the leadership of Chief Adviser Fakhruddin Ahmed. The caretaker ministry was formed on the background of the 2006–2008 Bangladeshi political crisis following a military coup, notoriously nicknamed "1/11" inspired by 9/11, led by General Moeen U Ahmed and the resignation of President Iajuddin Ahmed as the Chief Adviser. Ahmed appointed an team of thirteen advisers to form the government. During his tenure, many high-profile figures, most importantly the two dominant political party leaders Khaleda Zia and Sheikh Hasina, were arrested as part of the emergency government's anticorruption crusade and its attempt to break the women's stranglehold on the country's politics. The attempt was controversially known as the "minus two" formula due to the aim being the exclusion of the two from further political participation.

The caretaker government underwent a reshuffle on 8 January 2008.

== List of Advisers ==
Cabinet members
Portfolio	Minister	Took office	Left office	Remarks
Chief Adviser and also in-charge of: Cabinet Division; Ministry of Establishment; Bangladesh Election Commission	Fakhruddin Ahmed	12 January 2007	6 January 2009	
Adviser for Home Affairs	Fakhruddin Ahmed	12 January 2007	16 January 2008	Chief Adviser-in-charge.
Adviser for Home Affairs	M. A. Matin	16 January 2008	6 January 2009	
Adviser for Finance; Adviser for Planning	A. B. Mirza Azizul Islam	12 January 2007	6 January 2009	
Adviser for Commerce	A. B. Mirza Azizul Islam	12 January 2007	8 January 2008	
Adviser for Commerce	Hossain Zillur Rahman	9 January 2008	6 January 2009	
Adviser for Posts and Telecommunications	A. B. Mirza Azizul Islam	12 January 2007	8 January 2008	
Adviser for Posts and Telecommunications	Fakhruddin Ahmed	9 January 2008	6 January 2009	Chief Adviser-in-charge.
Adviser for Law, Justice and Parliamentary Affairs; Adviser for Land	Mainul Hosein	12 January 2007	8 January 2008	
Adviser for Law, Justice and Parliamentary Affairs; Adviser for Land	A. F. Hassan Ariff	9 January 2008	6 January 2009	
Adviser for Information	Mainul Hosein	12 January 2007	8 January 2008	
Adviser for Information	Chowdhury Sajjadul Karim	9 January 2008	6 January 2009	
Adviser for Housing and Public Works	Mainul Hosein	12 January 2007	8 January 2008	
Adviser for Housing and Public Works	Golam Kader	9 January 2008	6 January 2009	
Adviser for Liberation War Affairs; Adviser for Shipping; Adviser for Civil Aviation and Tourism	M. A. Matin	12 January 2007	6 January 2009	
Adviser for Communication	M. A. Matin	12 January 2007	8 January 2008	
Adviser for Communication	Golam Kader	9 January 2008	6 January 2009	
Adviser for Foreign Affairs; Adviser for Expatriates' Welfare and Overseas Employment	Iftekhar Chowdhury	12 January 2007	6 January 2009	
Adviser for Chittagong Hill Tracts Affairs	Iftekhar Chowdhury	12 January 2007	8 January 2008	
Adviser for Chittagong Hill Tracts Affairs	Fakhruddin Ahmed	8 January 2008	6 January 2009	Chief Adviser-in-charge.
Adviser for Agriculture; Adviser for Fisheries and Livestock	Chowdhury Sajjadul Karim	12 January 2007	6 January 2009	
Adviser for Local Government, Rural Development and Co-operatives; Adviser for Labour and Employment	Anwarul Iqbal	12 January 2007	6 January 2009	
Adviser for Education	Ayub Quadri	12 January 2007	26 December 2007	
Adviser for Education	Fakhruddin Ahmed	26 December 2007	9 January 2008	Chief Adviser-in-charge.
Adviser for Education	Hossain Zillur Rahman	9 January 2008	6 January 2009	
Adviser for Primary and Mass Education; Adviser for Cultural Affairs	Ayub Quadri	12 January 2007	26 December 2007	
Adviser for Primary and Mass Education; Adviser for Cultural Affairs	Fakhruddin Ahmed	26 December 2007	9 January 2008	Chief Adviser-in-charge.
Adviser for Primary and Mass Education; Adviser for Cultural Affairs	Rasheda K Chowdhury	9 January 2008	6 January 2009	
Adviser for Health and Family Welfare	A.S.M. Matiur Rahman	12 January 2007	8 January 2008	
Adviser for Health and Family Welfare	Shawkat Ali	9 January 2008	6 January 2009	
Adviser for Food and Disaster Management	Tapan Chowdhury	12 January 2007	8 January 2008	
Adviser for Food and Disaster Management	Shawkat Ali	9 January 2008	6 January 2009	
Adviser for Power, Energy and Mineral Resources; Adviser for Science and Technology; Adviser for Communications and Information Technology; Adviser for Youth and Sports	Tapan Chowdhury	12 January 2007	8 January 2008	
Adviser for Power, Energy and Mineral Resources; Adviser for Science and Technology; Adviser for Communications and Information Technology; Adviser for Youth and Sports	Fakhruddin Ahmed	9 January 2008	6 January 2009	Chief Adviser-in-charge.
Adviser for Water Resources	A.S.M. Matiur Rahman	12 January 2007	8 January 2008	
Adviser for Water Resources	Chowdhury Sajjadul Karim	9 January 2008	6 January 2009	
Adviser for Textiles and Jute	Geetiara Safya Chowdhury	12 January 2007	8 January 2008	
Adviser for Textiles and Jute	Anwarul Iqbal	9 January 2008	6 January 2009	
Adviser for Religious Affairs	A.S.M. Matiur Rahman	12 January 2007	8 January 2008	
Adviser for Religious Affairs	A. F. Hassan Ariff	9 January 2008	6 January 2009	
Adviser for Women and Children Affairs	Geetiara Safya Chowdhury	12 January 2007	8 January 2008	
Adviser for Women and Children Affairs	Rasheda K Chowdhury	9 January 2008	6 January 2009	
Adviser for Industries; Adviser for Social Welfare	Geetiara Safya Chowdhury	12 January 2007	8 January 2008	
Adviser for Environment and Forests	Chowdhury Sajjadul Karim	12 January 2007	8 January 2008	

== Criticism ==
Hasinur Rahman claimed in an interview in SATV that, Fakhruddin Ahmed ministry called 1/11 was the plan of India.
