= Ministry of Primary and Mass Education =

Government ministry of Bangladesh

- Bengali: প্রাথমিক ও গণশিক্ষা মন্ত্রণালয়
- Government Seal of Bangladesh

Ministry overview
- Formed: 1972; 54 years ago
- Jurisdiction: Government of Bangladesh
- Headquarters: Bangladesh Secretariat, Dhaka-1000
- Annual budget: ৳46738 crore (US$3.8 billion) (2026-2027)
- Minister responsible: A. N. M. Ehsanul Hoque Milan
- Minister of State responsible: Bobby Hajjaj
- Ministry executive: Abu Taher Md. Masud Rana, Secretary
- Child agencies: National Academy for Primary Education; Directorate of Primary Education
- Website: mopme.gov.bd

The Ministry of Primary and Mass Education (Bengali: প্রাথমিক ও গণশিক্ষা মন্ত্রণালয়; abbreviated as MoPME) is the ministry responsible for primary (class I-VIII) and mass education in Bangladesh. Secondary, vocational and tertiary educations is the responsibility of the Ministry of Education.

== Departments ==
- National Academy for Primary Education
- Directorate of Primary Education

== Ministers ==
Portrait	Minister	Term of office			Political party	Ministry	Prime Minister
Portrait	Minister	From	To	Period	Political party	Ministry	Prime Minister
	Khaleda Zia খালেদা জিয়া (1946–2025); MP for Feni-1 (Prime Minister)	15 August 1992	19 March 1996	3 years, 228 days	Bangladesh Nationalist Party	Khaleda I	Self
	Khaleda Zia খালেদা জিয়া (1946–2025); MP for Feni-1 (Prime Minister)	19 March 1996	30 March 1996	3 years, 228 days	Bangladesh Nationalist Party	Khaleda II	Self
	Muhammad Yunus মুহাম্মদ ইউনূস (born 1940) (Adviser)	31 March 1996	23 June 1996	84 days	Independent	Habibur	Habibur Rahman
	Abu Sharaf Hizbul Qader Sadique আবু শরফ হিজবুল কাদের সাদেক (1934–2007); MP for Jessore-6	23 June 1996	15 July 2001	5 years, 22 days	Awami League	Hasina I	Sheikh Hasina
	A. S. M. Shahjahan এ. এস. এম. শাহজাহান (1941–2019) (Adviser)	15 July 2001	10 October 2001	87 days	Independent	Latifur	Latifur Rahman
	Khaleda Zia খালেদা জিয়া (1946–2025); MP for Bogra-6 (Prime Minister)	10 October 2001	29 October 2006	5 years, 19 days	Bangladesh Nationalist Party	Khaleda II	Self
	Yasmeen Murshed ইয়াসমিন মোর্শেদ (1945–2025) (Adviser)	26 October 2006	11 January 2007	77 days	Independent	Iajuddin	Iajuddin Ahmed
	Ayub Quadri আইয়ুব কাদরি (born 1946) (Adviser)	12 January 2007	26 December 2007	348 days	Independent	Fakhruddin	Fakhruddin Ahmed
	Fakhruddin Ahmed ফখরুদ্দীন আহমেদ (born 1940) (Chief Adviser)	26 December 2007	9 January 2008	14 days	Independent	Fakhruddin	Fakhruddin Ahmed
	Rasheda K Chowdhury রাশেদা কে চৌধূরী (born 1951) (Adviser)	9 January 2008	6 January 2009	363 days	Independent	Fakhruddin	Fakhruddin Ahmed
	Nurul Islam Nahid নুরুল ইসলাম নাহিদ (born 1945); MP for Sylhet-6	6 January 2009	31 July 2009	206 days	Awami League	Hasina II	Sheikh Hasina
	Muhammad Afsarul Ameen মুহাম্মদ আফছারুল আমিন (1952–2023); MP for Chittagong-10	31 July 2009	21 November 2013	4 years, 113 days	Awami League	Hasina II	Sheikh Hasina
	Nurul Islam Nahid নুরুল ইসলাম নাহিদ (born 1945); MP for Sylhet-6	21 November 2013	12 January 2014	52 days	Awami League	Hasina II	Sheikh Hasina
	Mostafizur Rahman মোস্তাফিজুর রহমান (1953–2024); MP for Dinajpur-5	12 January 2014	7 January 2019	4 years, 360 days	Awami League	Hasina III	Sheikh Hasina
	Md Zakir Hossain মোঃ জাকির হোসেন (born 1966); MP for Kurigram-4 (State Minister, M/C)	7 January 2019	11 January 2024	5 years, 4 days	Awami League	Hasina IV	Sheikh Hasina
	Rumana Ali রুমানা আলী (born 1976) (State Minister, M/C)	11 January 2024	6 August 2024	208 days	Awami League	Hasina V	Sheikh Hasina
	Muhammad Yunus মূহাম্মদ ইউনূস (born 1940) (Chief Adviser)	9 August 2024	11 August 2024	2 days	Independent	Yunus	Muhammad Yunus
	Bidhan Ranjan Roy Poddar বিধান রঞ্জন রায় পোদ্দার (born 1963) (Adviser)	11 August 2024	17 February 2026	1 year, 190 days	Independent	Yunus	Muhammad Yunus
	A. N. M. Ehsanul Hoque Milan এ. এন. এম. এহসানুল হক মিলান (born 1957); MP for Chandpur-1	17 February 2026	Incumbent	190 days	Bangladesh Nationalist Party	Tarique	Tarique Rahman
