= A. F. Hassan Ariff =

Bangladeshi politician (1941–2024)

- এ. এফ. হাসান আরিফ
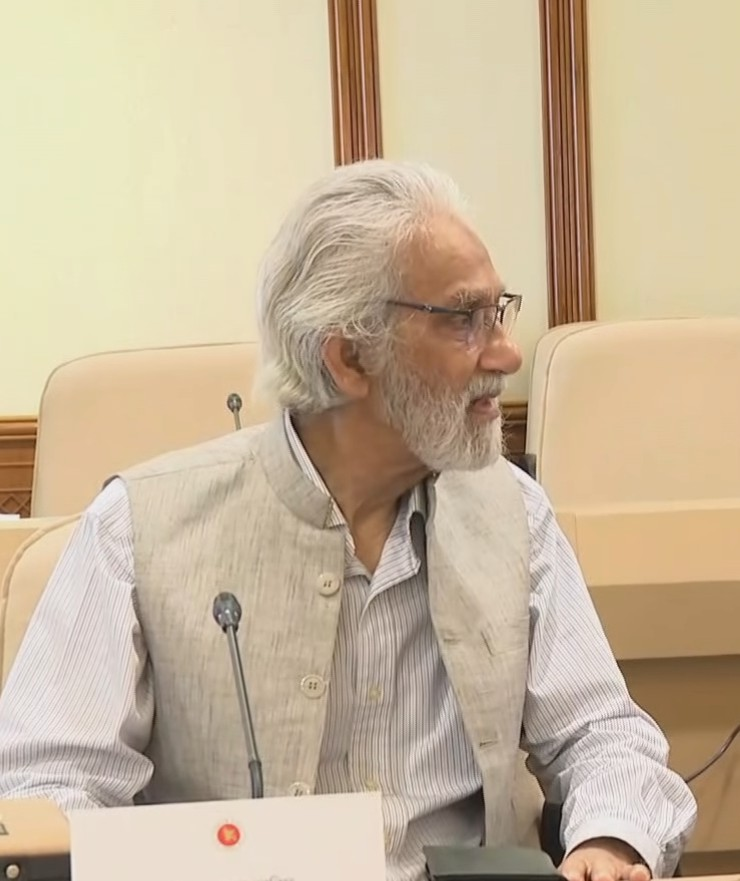
- Ariff in 2024

Adviser for Land
- In office 22 August 2024 – 20 December 2024
- Chief Adviser: Muhammad Yunus
- Preceded by: Narayon Chandra Chanda
- Succeeded by: Ali Imam Majumder
- In office 21 January 2008 – 6 January 2009
- Chief Adviser: Fakhruddin Ahmed
- Preceded by: Mainul Hosein
- Succeeded by: Rezaul Karim Hira

Adviser for Civil Aviation and Tourism
- In office 10 November 2024 – 20 December 2024
- Chief Adviser: Muhammad Yunus
- Preceded by: Faruk Khan
- Succeeded by: Mohammad Yunus

Adviser for Local Government, Rural Development and Co-operatives
- In office 9 August 2024 – 10 November 2024
- Chief Adviser: Muhammad Yunus
- Preceded by: Md Tazul Islam
- Succeeded by: Asif Mahmud

Adviser for Law
- In office 10 January 2008 – 6 January 2009
- Chief Adviser: Fakhruddin Ahmed
- Preceded by: Mainul Hosein
- Succeeded by: Shafique Ahmed

Adviser for Religious Affairs
- In office 10 January 2008 – 6 January 2009
- Chief Adviser: Fakhruddin Ahmed
- Preceded by: A.S.M. Matiur Rahman
- Succeeded by: Shahjahan Mia(as State Minister)

11th Attorney General of Bangladesh
- In office 14 October 2001 – 30 April 2005
- President: Shahabuddin Ahmed; A. Q. M. Badruddoza Chowdhury; Muhammad Jamiruddin Sircar; Iajuddin Ahmed
- Preceded by: Mahmudul Islam
- Succeeded by: A. J. Mohammad Ali

Personal details
- Born: 10 June 1941 Calcutta, Bengal Province, British India
- Died: 20 December 2024 (aged 83) Dhaka, Bangladesh
- Education: LLB
- Alma mater: Calcutta University

A. F. Hassan Ariff (10 July 1941 – 20 December 2024) was a Bangladeshi lawyer who served as the Attorney General for Bangladesh and an adviser in the caretaker government led by Fakhruddin Ahmed. He also served until his death as an adviser to the interim government led by Muhammad Yunus.

== Early life ==
Ariff was born in Calcutta, British India on 10 July 1941. He studied at St. Xavier's College, Calcutta, and later earned a Bachelor of Laws at the University of Calcutta.

== Career ==
In 1967, Ariff started his legal practice at the Calcutta High Court.

In 1970, Ariff began practising law in Dhaka after moving to East Pakistan.

From October 2001 to April 2005, Ariff served as the attorney general of Bangladesh. He admitted abuses were taking place under section 54, which allowed the police to detain suspects without warrants.

Ariff represented the Bangladesh Nationalist Party government in a case to close down Ekushey Television on 29 August 2002.

From January 2008 to January 2009, Ariff served as the legal adviser to the Fakhruddin Ahmed-led caretaker government. He supported the creation of a National Security Council. Under him, the attorney general's office prosecuted high-profile corruption cases against former prime ministers Khaleda Zia and Sheikh Hasina. He negotiated with Khaleda Zia in November 2008 on behalf of the caretaker government to ensure her party's participation in the next parliamentary elections.

In January 2018, the Bangladesh Judicial Service Association criticized Ariff for signing a statement critical of the lower court judges disciplinary rules in relation to the Secretary, Ministry of Finance v. Masdar Hossain case.

Ariff was an adviser to the Dhakeshwari National Temple Complex. He was the lead of AF Hassan Ariff & Associates.

== Personal life and death ==
Ariff's son is Muaaz Ariff. Muaaz was sued for domestic violence by his wife, Madhuri Akter Neela in June 2021. Also accused in the case were Ariff, his wife, and daughter.

Ariff died at Labaid Hospital in Dhaka on 20 December 2024, at the age of 83 from a heart attack. Following his death, the government of Bangladesh announced a day of mourning.

His Islamic funeral was held at the Dhanmondi 7 mosque on 20 December 2024. A second Islamic funeral was held the next day.
