= Ministry of Liberation War Affairs =

Government ministry of Bangladesh

- Bengali: মুক্তিযুদ্ধ বিষয়ক মন্ত্রণালয়
- Government Seal of Bangladesh

Agency overview
- Formed: 23 October 2001; 24 years ago
- Jurisdiction: Government of Bangladesh
- Headquarters: Bangladesh Secretariat, Dhaka
- Annual budget: ৳7515.46 crore (US$610 million) (2026-2027)
- Minister responsible: Ahmed Azam Khan
- Agency executive: Israt Chowdhury, Secretary
- Child agencies: Bangladesh Freedom Fighter Welfare Trust; National Freedom Fighter Council
- Website: Official Website

The Ministry of Liberation War Affairs (Bengali: মুক্তিযুদ্ধ বিষয়ক মন্ত্রণালয়, abbreviated as MoLWA) is the ministry responsible for the preservation of war memorials and the welfare of Freedom Fighters.

== History ==
In 2016, the Bangladeshi cabinet rejected a proposal of the ministry to raise the retirement age of freedom fighters. Mozammel Haque called for a review of ties with Pakistan.

== Directorate ==
- Bangladesh Freedom Fighter Welfare Trust
- National Freedom Fighter Council
- National Freedom Fighter Council
- Directorate of July Mass Uprising

== Ministers ==
Portrait	Minister (Birth-Death) Constituency	Term of office			Political party	Ministry	Prime Minister
Portrait	Minister (Birth-Death) Constituency	From	To	Period	Political party	Ministry	Prime Minister
	Redwan Ahmed রেদোয়ান আহমেদ; MP for Comilla-6 (State Minister)	23 October 2001	22 May 2003	1 year, 211 days	Bangladesh Nationalist Party	Khaleda II	Khaleda Zia
	Rezaul Karim Mannan রেজাউল করিম মান্নান; MP for Narayanganj-3 (State Minister)	22 May 2003	28 October 2006	3 years, 159 days	Bangladesh Nationalist Party	Khaleda II	Khaleda Zia
	Dhiraj Kumar Nath ধীরাজ কুমার নাথ (1945–2018) (Adviser)	31 October 2006	11 January 2007	77 days	Independent	Iajuddin	Iajuddin Ahmed
	Major General (Retd); M. A. Matin মেজর জেনারেল (অবসরপ্রাপ্ত) এম. এ. মতিন (Adviser)	11 January 2007	6 January 2009	1 year, 361 days	Independent	Fakhruddin	Fakhruddin Ahmed
	A. B. Tajul Islam এ. বি. তাজুল ইসলাম (born 1951); MP for Brahmanbaria-6 (State Minister)	6 January 2009	21 November 2013	4 years, 319 days	Awami League	Hasina II	Sheikh Hasina
	Shajahan Khan শাজাহান খান (born 1952); MP for Madaripur-2	21 November 2013	12 January 2014	52 days	Awami League	Hasina II	Sheikh Hasina
	AKM Mozammel Haque আ ক ম মোজাম্মেল হক (born 1946); MP for Gazipur-1	12 January 2014	5 August 2024	10 years, 206 days	Awami League	Hasina III	Sheikh Hasina
	AKM Mozammel Haque আ ক ম মোজাম্মেল হক (born 1946); MP for Gazipur-1	12 January 2014	5 August 2024	10 years, 206 days	Awami League	Hasina IV	Sheikh Hasina
	AKM Mozammel Haque আ ক ম মোজাম্মেল হক (born 1946); MP for Gazipur-1	12 January 2014	5 August 2024	10 years, 206 days	Awami League	Hasina V	Sheikh Hasina
	Faruk-e-Azam ফারুক-ই-আজম (Adviser)	13 August 2024	17 February 2026	1 year, 188 days	Independent	Yunus	Muhammad Yunus
	Hafizuddin Ahmed হাফিজউদ্দিন আহমেদ (born 1944); MP for Bhola-3	17 February 2026	12 March 2026	23 days	Bangladesh Nationalist Party	Tarique	Tarique Rahman
	Ahmed Azam Khan আহমেদ আযম খান (born 1957); MP for Tangail-8	12 March 2026	Incumbent	221 days	Bangladesh Nationalist Party	Tarique	Tarique Rahman

== State Ministers ==
Portrait	Minister (Birth-Death) Constituency	Term of office			Political party	Ministry	Prime Minister
Portrait	Minister (Birth-Death) Constituency	From	To	Period	Political party	Ministry	Prime Minister
	Ishraque Hossain ইশরাক হোসেন (born 1987); MP for Dhaka-6	17 February 2026	19 October 2026	244 days	Bangladesh Nationalist Party	Tarique	Tarique Rahman
