= M. A. Matin (general) =

Bangladeshi politician

M. A. Matin BP

Advisor for Liberation War Affairs
- In office 11 January 2007 – 6 January 2009
- Prime Minister: Iajuddin Ahmed (acting); Fazlul Haque (acting); Fakhruddin Ahmed (acting); Sheikh Hasina
- Preceded by: Dhiraj Kumar Nath
- Succeeded by: AB Tajul Islam

Personal details
- Born: 6 February 1943 (age 83) Tarail, Bengal Presidency, British India
- Awards: Bir Protik

Military service
- Allegiance: Pakistan (before 1971); Bangladesh
- Branch/service: Pakistan Army; Bangladesh Army
- Years of service: 1966–1998
- Rank: Major General
- Unit: East Bengal Regiment
- Commands: GOC of 24th Infantry Division; Director General of Forces Intelligence; GOC of 9th Infantry Division; AG of Army Headquarters; Commander of 309th Infantry Brigade; Commandant of East Bengal Regimental Centre
- Battles/wars: Bangladesh Liberation War; Chittagong Hill Tracts Conflict

M. A. Matin, Bir Protik, is a retired two star rank Bangladesh Army officer and advisor of the caretaker government led by Fakhruddin Ahmed.

== Early life and education ==
He was born on 6 February 1943 in Kishoreganj District. He obtained his bachelor's degree from Dhaka University.

== Career ==
Matin was commissioned on 5 June 1966 in the Pakistan Army. He reached the rank of captain there.

Later he served in the Bangladesh Army, retiring with the rank of major general. He was appointed advisor to the caretaker government of Bangladesh on 14 January 2007. He was placed in charge of the Ministry of Home Affairs.
