= Logi Boitha Movement =

Political rally

The Logi Boitha Movement (Bengali: লগি-বৈঠা আন্দোলন, Logi Boitha Andolan, romanized: Lôgi-boiṭhā āndōlôn, lit. 'Boat-hook and Oar Movement') or Logi Boitha Rally was a political rally on 28 October 2006 in Dhaka convened by the contemporary opposition party Awami League leader Sheikh Hasina, in reaction to alleged decisions taken by the then caretaker government. It was part of the political crisis in Bangladesh during 2006-2008.

== Background ==
The main demand of the assembly was not to appoint Khondokar Mahmud Hasan as Justice in the imminent caretaker government to conduct the general elections scheduled for January 2007. He was at one time the central leadership of the BNP. According to the then Awami League, the BNP amended the constitution to increase the retirement age of judges so that K M Hasan could be the chief adviser to the caretaker government. Although Khaleda Zia left power on 29 October 2006, Professor Iajuddin Ahmed was still in charge of the presidency. The Awami League and allied parties alleged that he was sympathetic to the BNP and law enforcement was following his lead.

== Events and results ==
The Awami League and its allies called a rally on 28 October 2006 on Bangabandhu Avenue in the Paltan area of Dhaka, where many people showed up with boathooks and oars. On the same day, Jamaat-e-Islami called a counter rally at the north gate of Baitul Mukarram. A significant number of casualties were reported, and several sensitive videos of the killings were published in the media. Jamaat-e-Islami claimed that a number of its leaders and activists had been killed in the attack. For three or four days in a row, BNP-Jamaat opponents have been in control of the Gulistan-Paltan area. Meanwhile, Justice K M Hasan refused to accept the post of head of the caretaker government, which upheld the demands of the Awami League and its allies. Later, an emergency law was enacted on 11 January 2007 and a new caretaker government was formed under the leadership of Fakhruddin Ahmed. As a result of this violence 40+ people died from October to November.

== Charge-sheet ==
On April 11, 2007, a chargesheet was filed against 46 Awami League and 14 party leaders and activists. After filing the chargesheet, on 22 April 2007, Metropolitan Magistrate Mir Ali Reza accepted the chargesheet of the case. Following the chargesheet, the court issued arrest warrants against the fugitives. The next day, on 23 April 2007, Mir Ali Reza suspended the warrant at the request of the investigating officer and directed further investigation into the case. After the formation of the Awami League government in 2009, it decided to withdraw the cases filed against their party leaders, supporters and well-wishers in different parts of the country. Following this decision, on 9 July 2009, Senior Assistant Secretary of the Ministry of Home Affairs Abu Saeed handed over a letter to the Dhaka Deputy Commissioner informing him of the decision to withdraw the murder case filed with the Paltan Police Station. On 17 August 2009, the court granted the application to withdraw the case.

== Other allegations ==
On 31 May 2007, Kotwali Model Police Station Sub-Inspector Sultan Mahmud Chowdhurya filed a chargesheet against 19 leaders and activists of the Awami League and its affiliates. The case (which was filed by Abdur Rahman on 8 November 2008) alleged that these 19 people has vandalised, set fire to and looted the office of the Islamic Social Welfare Council. On 8 June 2011, all the accused were acquitted in court.

== Criticism ==
Later, BNP leaders Khaleda Zia, Sadeque Hossain Khoka, Fakhrul Islam Alamgir and Jamaat-e-Islami leader Motiur Rahman Nizami and other political parties and leaders in various meetings and speeches against Awami League highlighted the movement negatively.

Hasinur Rahman claimed in an interview in SATV that, this movement was a creation of R&AW of India.
