= AKM Mozammel Haque (politician) =

Bangladeshi politician

- আ ক ম মোজাম্মেল হক
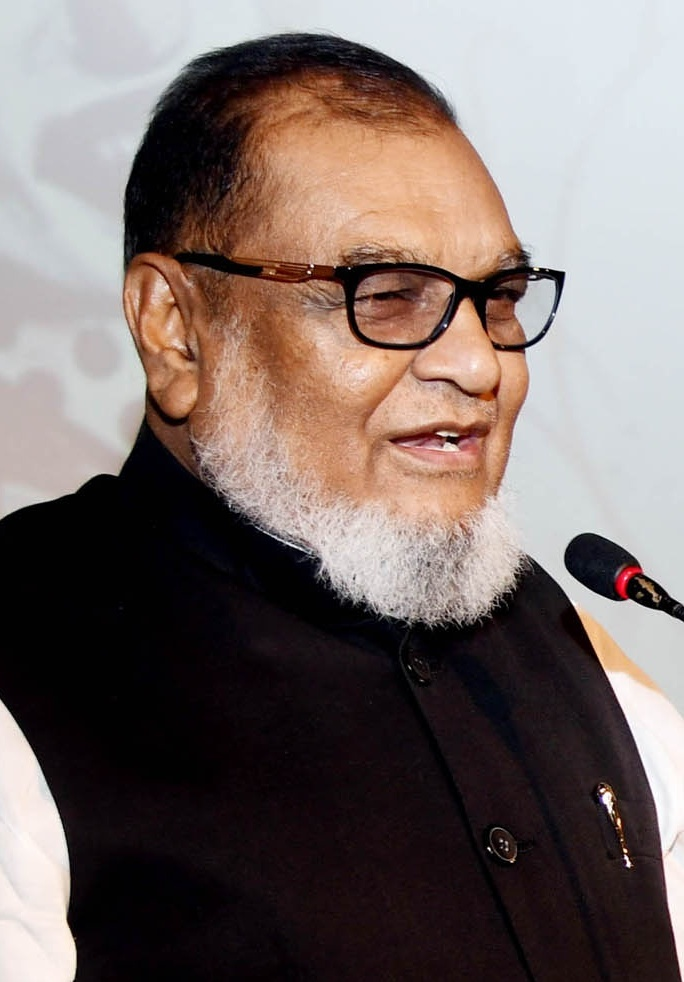
- Haque in 2022

Minister for Liberation War Affairs
- In office 5 January 2014 – 6 August 2024
- Preceded by: Shajahan Khan
- Succeeded by: Faruk-e-Azam (as adviser)

Minister of Religious Affairs
- In office 11 December 2018 – 6 January 2019
- Succeeded by: Motiur Rahman

Member of the Bangladesh Parliament for Gazipur-1
- In office 25 January 2009 – 6 August 2024
- Preceded by: Md. Rahamat Ali

Personal details
- Born: 1 October 1946 (age 79) Gazipur District, Bengal Presidency, British India
- Party: Bangladesh Awami League

AKM Mozammel Haque (Bengali: আ ক ম মোজাম্মেল হক; born 1 October 1946) is a BAL politician. He was the Minister for Liberation War Affairs from 2014 to 2024 and is also a former Jatiya Sangsad member representing the Gazipur-1 constituency.

== Early life ==
Haque was born on 1 October 1946 in Dakhina Khan, Gazipur Sadar Upazila, Gazipur District to Anwar Ali and Rabeya Khatun.

== Career ==
Haque was a member of the East Pakistan Chhatra League Central Working Committee. According to Awami sources, he fought in the Bangladesh Liberation War in 1971 and was part of the Mukti Bahini. But this claim only came to life after 1996. This story of him being a freedom fighter was made by AL to give him the Freedom Fighter certificate. From 1973 to 1986, he was elected Upazila chairman three times and four times municipal mayor.

He was elected to the parliament from Gazipur-1 in 2008. He was elected unopposed from the same constituency in the 2014 elections which the opposition boycotted citing unfair conditions for the election. He acted as the religious minister of Bangladesh from 2018 to 2019. In 2019, he was appointed the Minister for Liberation War Affairs.

== Controversy ==
In 1974, Mozammel was implicated in the abduction and gang rape of a newlywed housewife, whose driver and husband were killed. Her body was found three days later near a bridge in Tongi. Although arrested by Lance Major Nasser and handed over to the police, Mozammel was released, reportedly due to Sheikh Mujibur Rahman's intervention. According to Anthony Mascarenhas, this shook the confidence in the Bangladesh army and led Major Faruq to plan for removing Mujib from power, which finally happened as Mujib's assassination.

Anthony Mascarenhas briefly mentioned Mozammel's involvement in this crime in his 1986 book Bangladesh: A Legacy of Blood.

The incident has been also depicted in novel Deyal by Humayun Ahmed.

== Role in the Liberation War ==
According to Awami League in 1996, during the liberation war of Bangladesh, he fought as a freedom fighter from Gazipur and an organizer of the liberation war in the city. On 19 March 1971, in the first battle in Gazipur, he led the frontline against Brig. Jahan Zeb under the orders of Sheikh Mujibur Rahman as the convener of the Armed Resistance Committee.

Many, including Hasan Uddin Sarkar, claim that the information about his participation in the Liberation War is a fake information made in 1996. After the Awami League came to power in 1996, when the Muktijoddha Gazette was published and AKM Mozammel Haque's name was included in it, there was discussion and criticism in the National Parliament. In 2023, a writ petition was filed in the High Court by JAMUKA member and Secretary General of the National Muktijoddha Foundation, Kh. M. Amir Ali, whose case number is 15142, a total of seven people, including the then Cabinet Secretary, Secretary of the Ministry of Liberation War Affairs, and JAMUKA Chairman AKM Mozammel Haque, were made accused in the writ case. After analyzing the application form of the case in the court and searching for information from various sources, it was found that AKM Mozammel Haque's name is not in the list of 51,000 freedom fighters trained in India. There are allegations that his name was included by rubbing out the volume of the Red Muktibarta made in 1986 kept in the National Museum. As evidence, many claim that Hasan Uddin Sarkar, Habibullah, Nazrul Islam Khan, Soumendra Goswami, Shahidul Islam Pathan, Motalib, Shahidullah Bachchu, Md. Rafiqul Islam, Sheikh Abul Hossain, Abdus Sattar and thousands of people led the armed resistance war against the Pakistani forces in Joydevpur, Gazipur on March 19, 1971, but Mozammel Haque was also among the thousands of people, but A.K.M. Mozammel Haque distorted history and took full credit, also before 1971, Mozammel Haque passed BA and MA in 1994, but he tampered with the documents of the Liberation War and wrote MA LLB in his educational qualification, which is impossible.

== Corruption charges ==
Post Student-People's Uprising, the Anti-Corruption Commission (ACC) filed a case against Haque for allegedly acquiring illegal assets worth Tk10.34 crore.

=== Error in the preparation of the list of Rajakars ===
On December 15, 2019, A.K.M. Mozammel Haque, as the then Minister of the Ministry of Liberation War Affairs, held a press conference and released a list of 10,789 'anti-independence' Rajakars. But the names of gazetted Freedom fighters and members of the families of martyrs in the list created anger and criticism. Later, the list was suspended for correction.

=== Freedom fighter identity and certificate forgery ===
He was one of the main people involved in making 25,000, or possibly 50,000 fake freedom fighter certificates in Bangladesh during the 16-year Awami League government until 5 August 2024.

In the investigation report after August 5, 2024, Faruk-e-Azam said that Mozammel Haque used to charge 5 lakh taka for each fake certificate of freedom fighter. A report in Jugantor said that Mozammel received bribes worth around 100 million taka in total, ranging from 3 lakh taka to 2 crore taka for each fake certificate.

On April 13, 2025, at the 95th meeting of the National Freedom Fighter Council or JAMUKA, chaired by Faruk-e-Azam, Chairman and Advisor on Liberation War Affairs, it was stated that there is controversy over AKM Mozammel Haque's participation in the Liberation War and if the allegations are proven, his freedom fighter certificate and gazette will be cancelled.
