= Minister of Religious Affairs (Bangladesh) =

Cabinet office in the Bangladeshi government

People's Republic of Bangladesh Minister of Religious Affairs
- বাংলাদেশের ধর্ম বিষয়ক মন্ত্রী
- Government Seal of Bangladesh

- Flag of Bangladesh

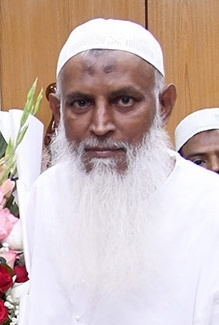
- Incumbent; Kazi Shah Mofazzal Hossain Kaikobad since 17 February 2026
- Ministry of Religious Affairs
- Style: The Honourable (formal); His Excellency (diplomatic)
- Type: Cabinet minister
- Status: Adviser
- Member of: Cabinet; Advisory Council; Parliament
- Reports to: Chief Adviser
- Seat: Bangladesh Secretariat
- Nominator: Chief Adviser of Bangladesh
- Appointer: President of Bangladesh; on the advice of the chief adviser
- Term length: Interim or the; chief adviser's pleasure
- Inaugural holder: Mahbubur Rahman
- Formation: 7 January 1984; 42 years ago
- Salary: ৳245000 (US$2,000) per month (incl. allowances)
- Website: mora.gov.bd

The minister of religious affairs is the minister in charge of the Ministry of Religious Affairs of the government of Bangladesh. He is also the minister of all departments and agencies under the Ministry of Religious Affairs. Prior to 1980, religion-related matters were looked after first under the Ministry of Education and later under the Ministry of Sports, Culture and Religion. It started its journey on January 25, 1980 through separate ministries and ministers. During the time of caretaker government The minister of religion affairs is known as Adviser of religion affairs.

== List of officeholders ==
Here are the names of all the ministers, advisors, state ministers and deputy ministers.

No.	Portrait	Name	Title	Start	End
1		Mahbubur Rahman	Minister	15 March 1984	1 June 1984
2		Khandaker Abu Bakr	Minister	1 June 1984	15 January 1985
3		K. M. Aminul Islam	Minister	9 November 1985	16 February 1986
4		A. K. M. Nurul Islam	State Minister	4 July 1985	25 May 1986
5		Shamsul Huda Chaudhury	Minister	16 February 1986	23 March 1986
6		Shamsul Huda Chaudhury	Minister	25 May 1986	9 July 1986
7		Abdul Mannan	Minister	9 July 1986	14 June 1988
8		M. Nazim Uddin Al Azad	Deputy Minister	10 December 1988	24 December 1989
9		M. Nazim Uddin Al Azad	Minister	24 December 1989	2 May 1990
10		Kazi Shah Mofazzal Hossain Kaikobad	State Minister	2 May 1990	6 December 1990
11		M A Khaleq	Advisor	26 December 1990	15 March 1991
12		Abdul Mannan	State Minister	20 March 1991	14 February 1993
13		Mohammad Keramat Ali	Minister	14 August 1993	18 October 1995
14		M. A. Mannan	State Minister	18 November 1995	19 March 1996
15		Fazlur Rahman Potol	State Minister	19 March 1996	30 March 1996
16		Abdur Rahman Khan	Advisor	3 April 1996	23 June 1996
17		Md. Nurul Islam	State Minister	23 June 1996	15 July 2001
18		Abdul Malik	Advisor	16 July 2001	10 October 2001
19		Mosharraf Hossain Shahjahan	State Minister	10 October 2001	29 October 2006
20		Mahbubul Alam (journalist)	Advisor	1 November 2006	11 January 2007
20		A. S. M. Matiur Rahman	Advisor	17 January 2007	8 January 2008
21		A. F. Hassan Ariff	Advisor	10 January 2008	6 January 2009
22		Sheikh Hasina	Prime Minister	6 January 2009	24 January 2009
23		Shahjahan Mia	State Minister	24 January 2009	21 November 2013
24		Mujibul Haque Mujib	Minister	21 November 2013	12 January 2014
25		Motiur Rahman	Minister	12 January 2014	10 December 2018
26		AKM Mozammel Haque	Minister	11 December 2018	7 January 2019
27		Sheikh Mohammed Abdullah	State Minister	7 January 2019	13 June 2020
28		Sheikh Hasina	Prime Minister	14 June 2020	24 November 2020
29		Md Faridul Haq Khan	Minister	24 November 2020	5 August 2024
30		A F M Khalid Hossain	Adviser	8 August 2024	Present

== See also ==
- Cabinet of Bangladesh
