= 2006–2008 Bangladesh political crisis =

Caretaker government term

- Date: 29 October 2006 – 29 December 2008
- Location: Dhaka, Bangladesh
- Caused by: Appointment of Chief Adviser
- Result: President Iajuddin Ahmed becomes Chief Adviser; Emergency declared; Iajuddin Ahmed is replaced as the Chief Adviser by Fakhruddin Ahmed but remains President.; Election held in 2008; Sheikh Hasina and the Bangladesh Awami League gain power; Abolition of Caretaker government system by parliament in 2011

Parties
Bangladeshi Political Parties: Bangladesh Awami League; Bangladesh Nationalist Party; Bangladesh Jamaat-e-Islami; Liberal Democratic Party (Bangladesh); Gano Forum; Jatiya Party (Manju)	Caretaker government of Bangladesh; Bangladesh Armed Forces; Bangladesh Police; Bangladesh Rifles

Lead figures
Sheikh Hasina; Khaleda Zia	Iajuddin Ahmed (2006–07); Fazlul Haque (2007); Fakhruddin Ahmed (2007–08)

Casualties
- Deaths: 40+
- Injuries: 2,000
- Damage: Several vehicles, offices, and shops burned or vandalized

The 2006–2008 Bangladeshi political crisis began as a caretaker government (CTG) assumed power at the end of October 2006 following the end of the Bangladesh Nationalist Party administration. The BNP government increased the chief justice's retirement age in an unconstitutional way to bias the appointment of the head of the caretaker government. CTG manages the government during the interim 90-day period and parliamentary elections. Political conflict began with the alleged appointment of a chief adviser, a role that devolved to the president, Iajuddin Ahmed. The interim period was marked from the beginning by violent protests initiated by the Awami League named Logi Boitha Andolan (Boat-hook and Oar Movement), with 40 people killed and hundreds injured in the first month. The Bangladesh Nationalist Party had its own complaints about the process and the opposition.

After extensive negotiations as the CTG tried to bring all the political parties to the table and had an agreement for a scheduled election, on 3 January 2007, the Awami League said that it and the other parties of its Grand Alliance would boycott the general election to be held on 22 January 2007. They complained about the lack of an accurate voters list. More widespread violence and political rioting followed.

The "bitter rivalry" between the Awami League and BNP has affected the nation for the last two decades, although their political positions are not so far apart. The parties are led by women who represent assassinated leaders. Sheikh Hasina, the eldest daughter of Sheikh Mujibur Rahman, has been head of the Awami League since 1981. Khaleda Zia, the head of the BNP, is the widow of the late president Ziaur Rahman, who, as president, founded the party in 1978.

On 11 January 2007, the military intervened to support the caretaker government of President Iajuddin, who had already declared a state of emergency. He accepted the resignations of most of his advisors. He also resigned as Chief Advisor, being replaced on 12 January by Fakhruddin Ahmed, who had worked for the World Bank. The government suppressed political activity to try to restore stability. In the spring, it started to work on corruption cases, charging 160 persons, including both party leaders, other politicians, civil servants, and businessmen for actions going back to the late 1990s. The nation has had an extreme reputation for corruption under both major political parties. In addition, some observers speculated that the caretaker government was trying to force both party leaders into exile to stabilise the country and reduce the political polarisation. The CTG also charged Sheikh Hasina with alleged murder for the deaths of four persons during protests in the fall of 2006. The High Court held that Khaleda Zia could not be charged under emergency law for events that happened prior to the emergency, but on appeal in September 2007, the Bangladesh Supreme Court ruled that the Zia trial should proceed. Near the end of 2008, the caretaker government moved to restore democratic government and held elections in December. The Awami League and Grand Alliance won by a two-thirds majority, and formed a government in 2009.

== Background ==
According to Bangladesh's unique system, at the time of national parliamentary elections, which must be held within ninety days of dissolving a parliament, a caretaker government is entrusted to oversee the process and manage in the interim. First established in an informal way, the CTG provisions were incorporated by amendment in 1996 into the constitution. It stipulates that the Chief Advisor position (with the status of Prime Minister) is filled by the appointment of the last retired Chief Justice of the Supreme Court. He appoints a maximum of ten advisors (with the status of ministers) to assist in managing the government. The caretaker government runs all the state's affairs during the 90-day interim, including conducting the nationwide parliamentary elections. During this interim period, the Defense Ministry's charge is transferred to the country's President of Bangladesh, who assumes the role of Commander-in-Chief.

== Protests ==
At the end of BNP's 2001–2006 term, BNP tried to assign K. M. Hasan as chief advisor of the caretaker government. By this, BNP tried to influence the results of the election. Seeing this, the Awami League questioned his neutrality. The immediate past chief justice, who was in line to become chief advisor of the caretaker government. With uncertainty about who would be appointed as CA, Awami supporters led protests and violence beginning on 28 October, popularly known as the Logi Boitha Movement, which resulted in at least 12 deaths and thousands of injuries. On that day, Awami League activists allegedly beat and killed members of an opposing party.

== Formation of caretaker government ==
Against the backdrop of the situation, the former Chief Justice K. M. Hasan declined to take the job of Chief Advisor (CA), citing health reasons. However, according to the provision, the constitutional obligations must be performed without fear or favour. Hindering this sacred responsibility is deemed to be a serious violation of the constitution, which is to be punished in the highest order.

According to a BDNews24 report based on later Wikileaks, Justice Hasan had started recruiting advisors before he was sworn in. President Iajuddin Ahmed directed his presidential advisor to organise meetings with the four major political parties representing parliament, but the parties were unable to agree on an appointment for chief advisor, although five men were considered.

Justice Mainur Reza Chowdhury was discussed as a nominee, but he died before appointment. Two retired justices of the Supreme Court: Justice M. A. Aziz and Justice Md. Hamidul Haque, were also considered. Aziz was the chief election commissioner (CEC) at that time. The Awami League complained about him in that position, so they did not accept him for CA. Justice Haque was disqualified as he had been appointed chairman of the Judicial Training Institute by the immediate past BNP government. Having held a for-profit office is a disqualification for the CA. In addition, BNP opposed his nomination as CA.

Justice Mahmudul Amin Chowdhury was considered. He had retired before Mainur Reza Chowdhury. The BNP opposed him, as the parliamentary adviser of Khaleda Zia was against him. In August 2012, The Daily Star reported that Khaleda Zia had said she regretted having opposed Mahmudul Amin Chowdhury's appointment at the time.

Given the parties' failure to agree on a candidate, according to the constitution, the position devolved to the president, Iajuddin Ahmed, serving since 2002. He took it on in addition to his regular responsibilities, which under the caretaker government included the Defense Ministry. Iajuddin Ahmed formed a government, appointing ten advisors to a council to act as ministers. He appointed his press spokesman, the journalist Mukhlesur Rahman Chowdhury, as his chief presidential advisor, with the status of Minister of State. Chowdhury was responsible for negotiating with the political parties to bring them to participate in the election.

The Awami League agreed to take part in the elections, but demanded that Iajuddin Ahmed make mass changes to the administration to free it from what they called the BNP's politicisation. They also demanded that a new and accurate voter list be compiled. The BNP also had its own issues with the opposition. Hussain Muhammad Ershad, head of the Jatiya Party allied with BNP, asked the CTG not to extend the date of submission of nominations for candidates, as requested by the Awami League, as his candidates had filed on time. At Sheikh Hasina's demand, a presidential advisor negotiated with the Election Commission to gain a two-day extension for filing nominations. On 23 December 2006, all political parties joined the planned elections of 22 January 2007. The last day of nomination filing was extended to 26 December 2006 to accommodate all political parties, as requested by Sheikh Hasnna to Mukhles Chowdhury.

On 3 January 2007, the last day possible, the Awami League declared that they and their allies would boycott the election. The withdrawal added to the political uncertainty, and more violent protests resulted, in which hundreds had already been injured. These actions had devastating, disruptive effects on the economy.

As the BBC noted,

The two women [Hasina and Zia] are bitter rivals and barely speak to each other. Their mutual loathing is reflected among their respective sets of supporters.

Bangladesh is one of the most politically polarised countries in the world, even though the actual policy differences between the two largest parties do not amount to anything significant.

But the ceaseless bickering and violent confrontations have meant that the Bangladeshi economy – already fragile – is coming under further pressure.

== Military intervention ==
Military representatives met with President Ahmed on 11 January, urging him to declare a state of emergency, and to resign and appoint an interim chief advisor. According to a United States diplomatic cable later released under Wikileaks, the army chief, General Moeen U Ahmed, and his group persuaded the president to declare a state of emergency on 11 January 2007. At the time, the Directorate General of Forces Intelligence & Counterterrorism, Brigadier General A T M Amin, met with the US Ambassador, Patricia Butenis, to explain the military's concerns. Given the Awami League's withdrawal from the elections, they believed that supporting a one-sided election might threaten the armed forces continued participation in UN peacekeeping missions – UNPKO, which they valued. In addition, they were worried about threatened terrorist violence from Jamaat-ul-Mujahideen Bangladesh (JMB), which had set off 300 bombs in August 2005. They wanted a neutral government established until "fair, free and credible elections" could be held in which all parties participated.

In the near term, Justice Fazlul Haque, the senior CTG advisor, was to be appointed interim chief advisor, and Fakhruddin Ahmed, a prominent banker, would quickly be appointed chief advisor to replace Iajuddin Ahmed. All of them were the violation of the constitution, and when a chief advisor or prime minister resigns, the whole advisory council or cabinet is deemed to be resigned, what Advisor Mukhlesur Rahman Chowdhury categorically pointed out. Mukhles Chowdhury also deleted some sentences, which were derogatory remarks against the country to justify the military intervention, written by Lt. Gen. Moeen in the president's speech broadcast on 11 January 2011. Moeen's main pillar of 11 January 2007 military coup was then military secretary to the president (MSP) Major General Aminul Karim.

Due to this, Advisor Mukhles Chowdhury attempted to replace him with then general officer commanding (GOC) of 24 Division Major General Md Abdul Mubeen, who was later appointed as army chief by successive government. Unfortunately, DG of Special Security Force (SSF) Major General Syed Fatemi Ahmed Rumi supported Aminul Karim and misled former prime minister Khaleda Zia on this. Initially. Mrs. Zia was convinced by Advisor Chowdhury, but later she took the side of Rumi. But what she did not realise that once loyal this army officer had already betrayed her. Although Rumi was posted long five years of Khaleda Zia's tenure with her, she was under surveillance by him as well. During those days, he intercepted her personal life. Ironically, an army group including him, tried to publish a Nikahnama (marriage document) of his once boss in Prothom Alo, a Bangla daily. Fatemi Rumi accompanied General Moeen to his maiden visit to India, he was posted by Moeen to Rangpur division of army where Moeen visited three times and worked to establish a university in Rangpur. Moreover, Rumi pressured businessmen to contribute donation for the Kings Party "Jago Bangladesh" a political party created by Moeen, which dies a natural death. Likewise, when Mukhles Chowdhury informed top politicians that by 12 January 2011, there would be martial law in Bangladesh, Brigadier Chowdhury Fazlul Bari misled Khaleda Zia with the help of Aminul Karim to implement Moeen's plan to capture Presidency. In addition, Amin (popularly known as Bihari Amin as he was a settler from India's Bihar Province) informed the US diplomats that the Director General for National Security Intelligence, Maj. Gen. Md. Rezzaqul Haider Chowdhury (Haider), was relieved from duty and being investigated. (Later that year, he was charged in the 10-Truck Arms and Ammunition Haul in Chittagong, an incident of smuggling to a militant organisation based in India) The President's remaining CTG advisor, M Mukhlesur Rahman Chowdhury, was also relieved of his duties. The cable noted that both men were believed to be paths of influence from Khaleda Zia and the BNP.

Assuring the diplomats of the military's support for the civilian government, Amin said their immediate goals for the caretaker government were to:

- "reconstitute the election commission,
- develop a credible voter list, and
- establish a roadmap to free and fair elections." It also wanted the interim government to tackle corruption and economic reform.

=== Cessation of election monitoring operations ===
The BBC reported on 11 January 2007, that, given the withdrawal of the Awami League and announced resignations, the United Nations and the European Union immediately suspended their election monitoring operations, as conditions for a credible vote did not exist. The EU said,

The European Commission has decided to suspend its Election Observation Mission (EOM) to Bangladesh covering the parliamentary elections on 22nd January. The European Commission has recalled the long-term observers already on the ground, and will not deploy the other phases of its observation mission, which was due to be led by MEP Alexander Graf Lambsdorff.

A spokesperson for UN Secretary-General Ban Ki-moon said,

The political crisis in Bangladesh has severely jeopardised the legitimacy of the electoral process. The announced cancellation of numerous international observation missions is regrettable. The United Nations has had to suspend all technical support to the electoral process, including by closing its International Coordination Office for Election Observers in Dhaka.

=== State of emergency ===
Gazette regarding the State of emergency

On the same day as the UN and EU withdrawal, Chief Advisor Iajuddin Ahmed announced a state of emergency in Bangladesh. He established a late night to early morning (11 p.m. to 5 a.m.) curfew. The Economist reported this action as a form of coup d'état. Within hours, President Ahmed announced his resignation as chief advisor and postponed the scheduled election. Prior to his resignation, he accepted the resignations of nine of the ten advisors of the caretaker government.

President Ahmed appointed Justice Fazlul Haque, the senior-ranking CTG advisor, as the interim Chief Advisor. The columnist Zafar Sobhan of the Daily Star newspaper wrote, "It is fairly apparent that it was done under pressure from the army because of the threat that the country could lose its peacekeeping role" with the United Nations, which was both prestigious and lucrative in terms of payment to the country.

On 12 January 2007, with military backing, the former Bangladesh Bank governor, Fakhruddin Ahmed, who had worked for the World Bank, was sworn in as the new Chief Advisor. He appointed five advisors on 13 January to form the new interim government. When he was officially named as the head of the caretaker government, he lifted the curfew. The state of emergency was continued, suspending some basic rights provided by the constitution, such as the freedom of movement, assembly, and speech to limit protests and disruptive political activity.

=== Corruption and murder charges ===
In 2007, the caretaker government pursued graft and corruption charges against both major party leaders and some of their senior staff, trying to clean up the country, which was notorious for corruption. It filed charges against 160 politicians, civil servants, and businessmen, including Tareque and Arafat Rahman, two sons of the former prime minister, Khaleda Zia, who were both active in the BNP. Later in the year, the government filed charges of corruption against both her and Sheikh Hasina, leader of the Awami League. This anti-corruption effort was greeted with approval by the people, who were tired of government officials "siphoning off the country's wealth."

In April, the media reported that the caretaker government was trying to force both major party leaders out of the country, which was needed to reform the political system. Supporters of Khaleda Zia were negotiating for her to go to Saudi Arabia, but that country declined. The CTG banned Sheikh Hasina from returning from a trip and had prohibited political activity. By 26 April 2007, the government had changed its position, and allowed Hasina to return and both leaders to resume political activities. Hasina was being charged with murder for the deaths of four opposition supporters in late 2006, allegedly due to attacks by her party members, prior to the state of emergency being imposed.

On 12 July 2007, Sheikh Hasina, party leader of the Awami League, was arrested for graft, based on charges filed by a businessman against her for actions in 1998.

=== Restoration of parliamentary democracy ===
After holding power for more than a year, the CTG decided to hold local elections in some locations on 4 August 2008. The main parties criticised this as unconstitutional. General elections were held on 29 December 2008, when the Awami League and its Grand Alliance won two-thirds of the seats in parliament. The BNP and its four-party alliance, including Jamaat-e-Islami, comprised the major opposition.
