= Family Waqf =

Private or family waqf (Arabic: وقف أهلي (ذري)) involves dedicating the principal (asset) and allocating its benefit to the waqif's (founder’s) descendants, offspring, or specified individuals, exclusively or alongside others. The waqf can be established using terms such as "offspring," "descendants," "posterity," or "family and kin". This type of waqf differs from other social support systems due to its unique social solidarity. However, it may be revoked if it harms the heirs. Some countries regulate family waqf by limiting the waqif to dedicating no more than one-third of their wealth. Family waqf contributes to enhancing educational standards, reducing unemployment, and balancing public expenditure, among other benefits.

== Definition ==
- Linguistic Meaning of "Dhurriyyah" (Descendants)

In language, dhurriyyah refers to a singular or plural form indicating descendants of humans and jinn. It can mean young individuals, as in "this boy is so-and-so's descendant," or groups, as in "those boys are descendants of so-and-so." It may also include men, women, and children, as in the saying "the finest men are the descendants of so-and-so," or "the best women are descendants of the righteous."

- Terminological Meaning of "Dhurriyyah"

Dhurriyyah refers to children and grandchildren, including both offspring of sons and daughters, whether young or old, male, or female. For example, in the Quran: Allah stated “And We gave to him Isaac and Jacob — each of them We guided. And Noah We guided before, and among his descendants, David and Solomon and Job and Joseph and Moses and Aaron. Thus, do We reward the doers of good. And Zechariah, John, Jesus, and Elias — and all were of the righteous.” Here, Isa (Jesus) is considered among Ibrahim's (Abraham) descendants, even though he is not a direct son or from the male lineage.

- Terminological Meaning of Family Waqf

Family waqf is the dedication of the principal asset and the allocation of its benefit to the waqif's descendants and offspring or specific individuals, either exclusively or alongside others. It may also involve dedicating the benefit initially to specific individuals and then to a charitable cause that does not cease.

== Ruling on Family Waqf ==
=== First Opinion: Permissibility ===
This is the stance of the majority of Islamic jurists, and was the prevalent practice in Najd before the reform movement of Imam Muhammad ibn Abd al-Wahhab. According to this opinion, it is permissible to dedicate a waqf for one's descendants, as agreed upon by the four major schools of Islamic jurisprudence: Hanafi, Maliki, Shafi'i, and Hanbali.

Ibn Umar (may Allah be pleased with him) narrated: "Umar acquired a piece of land in Khaybar and came to the Prophet ﷺ saying, 'O Messenger of Allah, I have obtained a piece of land more valuable to me than anything I have ever acquired. What do you advise me to do with it?' The Prophet ﷺ replied, 'If you wish, retain its principal and donate its yield as charity.' So, Umar gave it as charity on the condition that its principal would not be sold, given away, or inherited. He allocated it to the poor, relatives, slaves, those striving in Allah's cause, travelers, and guests, with no blame on its caretaker if they consumed from it reasonably or gave it to a friend without intending wealth." (Sahih Muslim).

In this hadith, Umar dedicated his waqf to the poor and his relatives without differentiating between inheriting and non-inheriting relatives, and Muhammad approved it. Similarly, other companions of Muhammad engaged in family waqf without facing objections, establishing its permissibility.

=== Second Opinion: Prohibition ===
This view was championed by Imam Muhammad ibn Abd al-Wahhab, followed by some scholars of Najd, including his descendants and others. They argued against family waqf based on the following evidence:

The Prophet ﷺ said: "Indeed, Allah has given everyone entitled to a share their due right. Thus, there is no bequest for an heir." (Sunan al-Tirmidhi).

Family waqf was likened to a bequest that violates the prohibition of giving to heirs.

The intent of the waqif in family waqf may lead to impermissible outcomes, making it inadvisable to support or enable such intentions.

== Forms ==
Family waqf can be established in several ways, using various phrases:

1. Using the Term "Offspring": For example, the waqif says, "I dedicate this waqf for my children and their descendants."
2. Using Specific Names: For instance, "I dedicate this waqf for my sons Zayd and Amr, then after them, for their children, and subsequently for the poor." Scholars suggest that if one of them dies, their share should go to their offspring to align with the waqif's intended benefit.
3. Using Terms Like "Descendants," "Progeny," or "Lineage": The waqif may state, "I dedicate this waqf for my progeny, descendants, or lineage."
4. Using Terms Like "Family" or "Kin": Example, "I dedicate this waqf for my family," which includes direct children, the children of one’s father and grandfather up to three generations, according to many scholars. Shaykh al-Islam Ibn Taymiyyah also held that wives are included in "family." The terms "family" (ahl) and "kin" (āl) are considered equivalent in this context.

== Types ==
=== Charitable Waqf ===
A waqf whose benefits serve the public or a charitable entity, such as a mosque, school, or hospital.

=== Family or Private Waqf (Ahli or Dhurri) ===
A waqf whose benefits are exclusively directed toward the family, descendants, or close relatives of the founder, excluding other members of society. As Sheikh Sayed Sabeq explained: "Sometimes a waqf is established for the benefit of descendants, relatives, and subsequently the poor, and this is referred to as family or private waqf (ahli or dhurri)."

=== Mixed Waqf ===
A waqf that combines aspects of both charitable and family waqf. For example, a person dedicates a property, allocating part of its revenue for their descendants and the remainder for charitable causes.

== Goals ==
1. Promoting Social Solidarity: Providing support and easing financial burdens on relatives.
2. Maintaining Kinship Bonds: Strengthening family ties and enabling benefactors to support their relatives.
3. Encouraging Love and Unity: Enhancing familial connections and fostering mutual care.

== Regulation ==
Several Islamic countries including, Libya, Lebanon, and Morocco, have chosen to regulate family waqf rather than abolish it, taking into account the varying social, cultural, and legal contexts. Examples of these regulations include:

1. The waqf is considered void unless sanctioned by a Sharia judge.
2. Restricting family waqf to a maximum of two generations.
3. Preventing individuals from dedicating more than one-third of their wealth to waqf, in consideration of the heirs' rights.
4. Ensuring that family waqf does not conflict with Islamic inheritance laws.
5. Ending the waqf if the property deteriorates beyond repair or the beneficiaries' shares become insufficient.
6. Allowing the founder to revoke or modify the waqf, including its conditions and distribution.
7. Empowering the authorities to liquidate family waqf if deemed necessary for public or beneficiary welfare.
8. Allocating 15% of the waqf's assets for charitable purposes when the family waqf ends, ensuring a fair outcome for all parties involved.

== Between Abolition and Regulation ==
Sultan Baibars considered applying the theory of state ownership of lands, seizing all lands, including waqf properties. Similarly, Barquq Atabeg, sought to abolish family waqf in the 8th century AH. The motivation was not that family waqf obstructed inheritance, but to nullify waqfs established by previous rulers who used waqf as a pretext to protect their wealth. Some countries have enacted legislation to regulate family waqf, establishing controls to achieve its intended purpose. On the other hand, some Islamic countries have legislated the abolition of family waqf, dissolving previous family waqfs, distributing them to eligible heirs, and prohibiting their future, establishment for the following reasons:

1. Harm to Heirs: Many founders of family waqf deviated from its legitimate purpose, such as: denying some children their rights while favoring others, prioritizing the wife over the children, or denying married daughters their share.
2. Evasion of Inheritance and Will Rules: Some aimed to preserve wealth for their descendants, avoiding inheritance and will regulations and ensuring their assets remained intact.
3. Increased Number of Beneficiaries: The increasing number of beneficiaries over generations reduced individual shares from the revenue, making it challenging to maintain the waqf due to diminishing returns. Because beneficiaries are interested in the returns of the waqf only, that makes the real states or farms that is under family waqf threaten by destruction and loss.
4. Mismanagement of Waqf: Poor administration, corruption, and the lack of religious commitment among caretakers led to inefficient management. The proliferation of family waqfs negatively impacted the state economy by freezing assets and removing them from financial circulation.

== Revenue from Family Waqf ==
The revenue from family waqf is allocated to the founder, followed by their children, grandchildren, and descendants, particularly male heirs. If the family lineage becomes extinct, the waqf is redirected to charitable purposes. To sustain familial initiatives, wealthy family members often establish one or more waqfs dedicated to family activities and needs.

== Impact on social development ==
1. Reducing Unemployment:
2. Enhancing Educational Levels:
3. Protecting Descendants from Poverty:
4. Provides peace of mind to beneficiaries.
5. Providing peace of mind to the waqf founder by preserving the family's assets.
6. Fostering harmony and bonds within society.

== Impact on economic development ==
1. Increasing National Production.
2. Preserving Wealth and Preventing its Fragmentation.
3. Achieving Balance in Public Spending.

== In history ==
Egypt recognized family waqf as a system of freezing property from ownership and transfer, with its revenue dedicated to the family or descendants. These beneficiaries would enjoy the income without holding ownership rights over the property itself, ensuring it remained intact for future generations. One of the historical documents found from this period involves a man named "Mati" from the Fifth Dynasty. He established an "institution" for the benefit of his children through a deed of donation issued to his eldest son. The deed explicitly instructed the son to allocate revenues among his siblings while stipulating that the properties could not be transferred. Upon the children’s death, ownership would pass to their descendants, with administration entrusted to the eldest son in each generation of beneficiaries.

== Examples of Family Waqf ==
=== Waqf of Al-Zubayr ibn Al-Awwam ===
Al-Zubayr dedicated his houses as charity for himself and his sons. These properties were not to be sold, gifted, or inherited. Any divorced daughters had the right to reside in the houses without causing harm or being harmed. However, if a daughter became financially independent through marriage, she forfeited her right to reside there. Among the continued benefits of Al-Zubayr’s waqf, it is mentioned that the houses of Amr ibn Al-Zubayr, located west of Talha’s house, and the adjoining house of Urwa, were properties established as waqf by Al-Zubayr for himself, his descendants, and his progeny.

=== Prominent Family Waqf during the Umayyad and Abbasid Eras ===
1. Waqf of Amir ibn Hamza ibn Abdullah ibn Al-Zubayr: He dedicated his share in "Al-Rubud" to his two daughters and then to his sister.
2. Waqf of Muhammad ibn Sulayman: He, along with his brother Ja’far ibn Sulayman, purchased a well between Basra and Al-Hafr. They also bought slaves and provided them with housing in those properties.

=== Notable Contemporary Family Waqf ===
Waqf of Suleiman Al-Rajhi: This waqf is represented in a family-owned company established by family members and dedicated as a waqf. The company is directed toward pioneering social initiatives.

== Promoting the Culture of Family Waqf ==
Several factors contribute to fostering the culture of family waqf, including the realization by waqf founders that such initiatives secure social objectives for their descendants. Examples of waqf disbursements include supporting descendants who wish to perform Hajj, assisting those seeking marriage, helping family members in debt, providing interest-free loans to family members. These types of family waqf disbursements strengthen loyalty to the waqf and serve as a social safety net for the family.

== Objectives of Waqf for Descendants ==
1. Fear of the dissipation of wealth by heirs.
2. Ensuring a perpetual financial source for descendants.
3. The presence of weak heirs, prompting the founder to fear for the loss of their rights.
4. Excluding daughters' offspring from inheritance and preventing other families from acquiring ownership through them.
5. Excluding non-descendant heirs, such as parents, spouses, or siblings, by dedicating the waqf to descendants with the intent of exclusion.

== The Difference Between Waqf for Descendants and Inheritance ==
- Inheritance is divinely ordained by Allah, who has determined the rights of heirs, while waqf originates from human initiative; an individual may choose to establish or amend it.
- Inheritance requires the actual death of the deceased, whereas waqf eligibility is determined by the conditions set by the founder.
- In inheritance, eligibility is contingent upon the existence of the heir as an embryo or a living person, whereas waqf may be designated for children, grandchildren, and great-grandchildren, even if some of them are not yet born at the time of its establishment.
- Inheritance shares are fixed and unchanging as per Islamic law, while waqf allocations depend on the conditions set by the founder.
- In inheritance, spouses are entitled to their shares, whereas in waqf, they are only included if specified by the founder.

== See also ==
- Central Waqf Council (India)
- Jerusalem Islamic Waqf
- Charitable trust
- Islamic economic jurisprudence
- Islamic economics in the world
- Private foundation
- Trust law
- Zakah
- Waqf of Ibshir Mustafa Pasha Complex
- AWQAF Africa
- Haryana Waqf Board (India)
- Ministry of Awqaf (Egypt)
- Office of the Waqf Administrator (Bangladesh)
