= Dhiraj Kumar Nath =

Bangladeshi diplomat (1945–2018)

- ধীরাজ কুমার নাথ

Minister of Liberation War Affairs
- In office 26 October 2006 – 11 January 2007
- Prime Minister: Khaleda Zia; Iajuddin Ahmed (acting)
- Preceded by: Redwan Ahmed
- Succeeded by: M. A. Matin

Personal details
- Born: 9 January 1945 Begumganj, Bengal, British India
- Died: 5 January 2018 (aged 72) Dhaka, Bangladesh
- Education: Chaumuhani Modonmohan High School; University of Dhaka
- Occupation: Diplomat

Dhiraj Kumar Nath (9 January 1945 – 5 January 2018) was a Bangladeshi civil servant. He was named as an advisor of the interim caretaker government of Bangladesh in October 2006.

== Education and career ==
Nath was born in the Rafiqpur village of Begumganj thana of Noakhali district. His father was the late Karuna Kanta Nath and mother the late Shabitri Sundari Debi.

He received a post-graduate degree from Dhaka University. He joined the East Pakistan Civil Service in 1969. He took part in the Bangladesh Liberation War in 1971. After the independence of Bangladesh he worked as the Mohokuma Proshashak (Sub-Divisional Officer) in Gazipur in 1978. He was the Additional Secretary of the Health and Family Welfare Ministry and Secretary of Rural Development, and Cooperative Division, from which he retired in 2003.

He was nominated as one of the advisers of the caretaker government along with nine other members.

Nath also wrote some books, of which the famous ones are Pother Dudharay and Shompritir Jonopoday.
