= Rasheda K Chowdhury =

Bangladeshi academic

- রাশেদা কে চৌধূরী
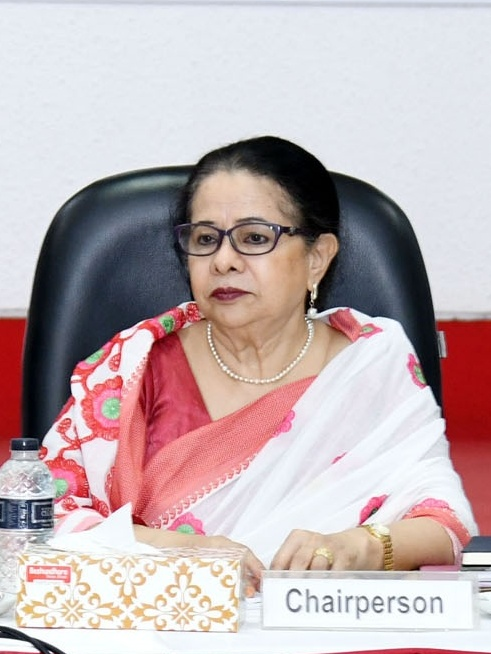
- Rasheda K Chowdhury in April 2025

Advisor of Caretaker Government of Bangladesh
- In office 12 January 2007 – 6 January 2009
- President: Iajuddin Ahmed
- Preceded by: Fazlul Haque (Acting)
- Succeeded by: Sheikh Hasina

Personal details
- Born: 1951 (age 74–75) Sylhet, Bangladesh
- Party: Independent

Rasheda K Chowdhury (Bengali: রাশেদা কে চৌধূরী) is a Bangladeshi academic and Advisor of Caretaker Government led by Fakhruddin Ahmed.

== Career ==
In January 2017 she was elected president of Dhaka University's English Department Alumni Society. She is the Executive Director of the Campaign for Popular Education. She was the adviser of Primary and Mass education in the caretaker government led by Fakhruddin Ahmed.
