= Mukhlesur Rahman Chowdhury =

Bangladeshi politician and journalist (born 1965)

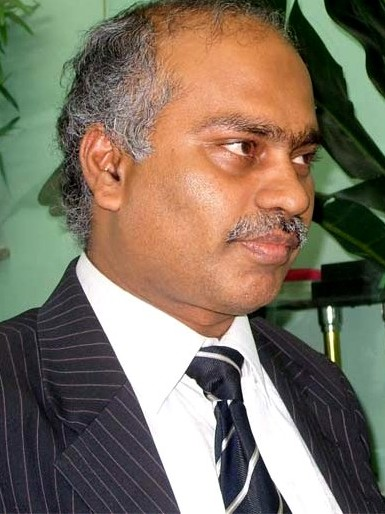
- Chowdhury, circa 2008

Advisor of the President of Bangladesh
- In office 13 November 2006 – 15 January 2007
- President: Iajuddin Ahmed

Personal details
- Born: 1965 (age 60–61) East Pakistan, Pakistan
- Party: Independent
- Children: 4
- Education: University of Dhaka; King's College London; University of Sunderland
- Occupation: Journalist, editor, politician

Mukhlesur Rahman Chowdhury (Bengali: মোখলেসুর রহমান চৌধুরী), also known as Mokhles Chowdhury, is a Bangladeshi journalist and editor. He served as Press Secretary and an advisor for a brief period of the President Iajuddin Ahmed.

== Early life and education ==
Mukhlesur Rahman Chowdhury was born to Sharifa Aziz Chowdhury and Azizur Rahman Chowdhury, editor-in-chief of the Weekly Prekshit. He has five brothers and one sister. Their ancestral village is Katihara in Lakhai Upazila.

Chowdhury received his master's in mass communication and journalism from the University of Dhaka. He did research with distinction at King's College London, under King's-UNHCR Scholarship.

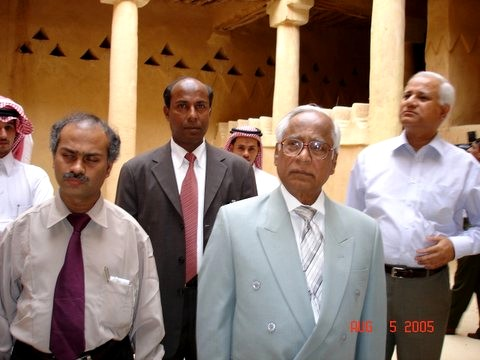
Chowdhury with Iajuddin Ahmed, President of Bangladesh (1st from left), Riyadh, Saudi Arabia, 5 August 2005

== Career ==
In January 1991, he became special correspondent for the Ajker Kagoj. In September 1991, he became a diplomatic correspondent for the Dainik Dinkal. In 1993, he became a correspondent for Upali Newspapers of Sri Lanka.

In December 2003, Chowdhury was elected President of the Overseas Correspondents' Association Bangladesh-OCAB (Foreign Journalists Association) for 2004. He was the first Joint Secretary General of the Commonwealth Journalists Association (CJA), Bangladesh.

Chowdhury was appointed press secretary by President Iajuddin Ahmed, serving from December 2004 to November 2006. On 13 November 2006, after President Ahmed took on the responsibility as Chief Advisor of the Caretaker Government, he appointed Chowdhury as one of his advisors, with the status of a Minister of State.

=== Working with US and UN to stop martial law ===
Chowdhury used good offices of the western diplomats led by the US Ambassador Patricia A. Butenis and stopped the martial law while the army group had to retreat to the option of the state of emergency, which was supported by all political parties for their own interests. Khaleda Zia with Moeen's support on 29 October 2006 made all the papers of the state of emergency. However, Chowdhury stopped the declaration of the emergency at night when the President Dr. Iajuddin Ahmed took over as the CA. Chowdhury was arguing through declaration of emergency the Army Chief would take over power. The AL led alliance was supporting the emergency from the beginning. At this stage, President Iajuddin declared a state of emergency on 11 January and postponed the elections under the pressure of Moeen and his army group, as they would not be valid without full participation of the parties A group of military officers intervened to ensure stability, in what became called "One-Eleven." They established an interim government.

In November and December 2006, Chowdhury worked with the US Ambassador in Dhaka Patricia A. Butenis, Under Secretary of State of the US Nicholas Burns called him from State Department, Washington, D.C., he had talk with US Assistant Secretary of State Richard A. Boucher and at Chowdhury's invitation UN Secretary General Kofi A. Annan sent his emissaries to Bangladesh to stop martial law. Responding Chowdhury's all these initiatives Special Envoy Craig Jennes led a two-member UN delegation to Bangladesh and finally Patricia A. Butenis and Anwar Choudhury met Principal Staff Officer General Jahangir Alam Chowdhury and Chief of Army Staff General Moeen U Ahmed, transmitted message not go ahead with their martial law option and informed if it happens Bangladeshi Peacekeepers will be back from the UN Peacekeeping Mission and there will be sanctions imposed on Bangladesh by the UN. Another message for army was to go back to barrack after restoring democracy holding parliamentary election within very short time, thus army rule's days were numbered.

During 1994–1995, Bangladesh had a similar political deadlock, when the Awami League boycotted the 15 February 1996 election because no caretaker government had been established. In that event, negotiations had been led by the then-Commonwealth Secretary General Chief Emeka Anyaoku's special envoy Sir Ninian Stephen.

The violence and crisis in Bangladesh received international media coverage. In December 2006, WikiLeaks leaked documents from Chowdhury's mission with diplomats, including Patricia A. Butenis, as well as politicians and other stakeholders on solving Bangladesh's political impasses, when they had worked together during the volatile political situation in 2006-07 period. The caretaker government struggled to hold elections within the constitutional 90-day deadline. The dates for the scheduled election were changed to 21 January, then 23 January, and finally 22 January 2007 in efforts to accommodate the political parties.

Chowdhury had a series of meetings with stakeholders on governance and politics. With the help of United States envoys, he stopped the imposition of martial law planned by General Moeen U Ahmed and his associates.

== Military intervention ==
Chowdhury later said that General Moeen, Army Chief, was the main force in the military intervention and declaration by President Iajuddin Ahmed of a state of emergency on 11 January 2007. He started speaking against army-backed government on 12 January and his interviews were published by the Manabzamin, Naya Diganta and Amader Shomoy. According to Amar Desh reporting in 2009, Chowdhury said that Moeen had intended to capture the country's presidency through the interim Caretaker Government headed by Fakhruddin Ahmed, formerly with the World Bank. Aminul Karim united army dissident groups and also used Gen. Masud and Brig. Bari to achieve this. The main motto of Moeen, Aminul Karim and A T M Amin was to make Moeen President of the country "Military coup in Bangladesh: Dateline 2007", one of his fact-finding write-ups about the One Eleven conspiracy, was published in the weekly Akhon Samoy of New York. Minister Chowdhury revealed untold facts about 2007 military intervention in Bangladesh in interviews taken by media that include the Bangladesh Pratidin, the daily Kaler Kantho, and the Daily Sun.

Chowdhury later said that General Moeen, Army Chief, was the main force in the military intervention and declaration by President Iajuddin Ahmed of a state of emergency on 11 January 2007. He started speaking against army-backed government on 12 January and his interviews were published by the Manabzamin, Naya Diganta and Amader Shomoy. According to Amar Desh reporting in 2009, Chowdhury said that Moeen had intended to capture the country's presidency through the interim Caretaker Government headed by Fakhruddin Ahmed, formerly with the World Bank. Aminul Karim united army dissident groups and also used Gen. Masud and Brig. Bari to achieve this. The main motto of Moeen, Aminul Karim and A T M Amin was to make Moeen President of the country "Military coup in Bangladesh: Dateline 2007", one of his fact-finding write-ups about the One Eleven conspiracy, was published in the weekly Akhon Samoy of New York. Minister Chowdhury revealed untold facts about 2007 military intervention in Bangladesh in interviews taken by media that include the Bangladesh Pratidin, the daily Kaler Kantho, and the Daily Sun. Chowdhury resigned under pressure. Chowdhury brought all the political parties including agitating Grand Alliance in the parliamentary election of 22 January 2007 after having a series of meetings with them and agreeing to their demands. As a result, the Grand Alliance was in that election from 23 December 2006 to 3 January 2007.

Chowdhury has been the chief editor of the Bangladesh Worldwide and the Editor of the Weekly Prekkhit and magazine the Sromo. He has been Senior Editor of Birkbeck Law Review.

== Publications ==
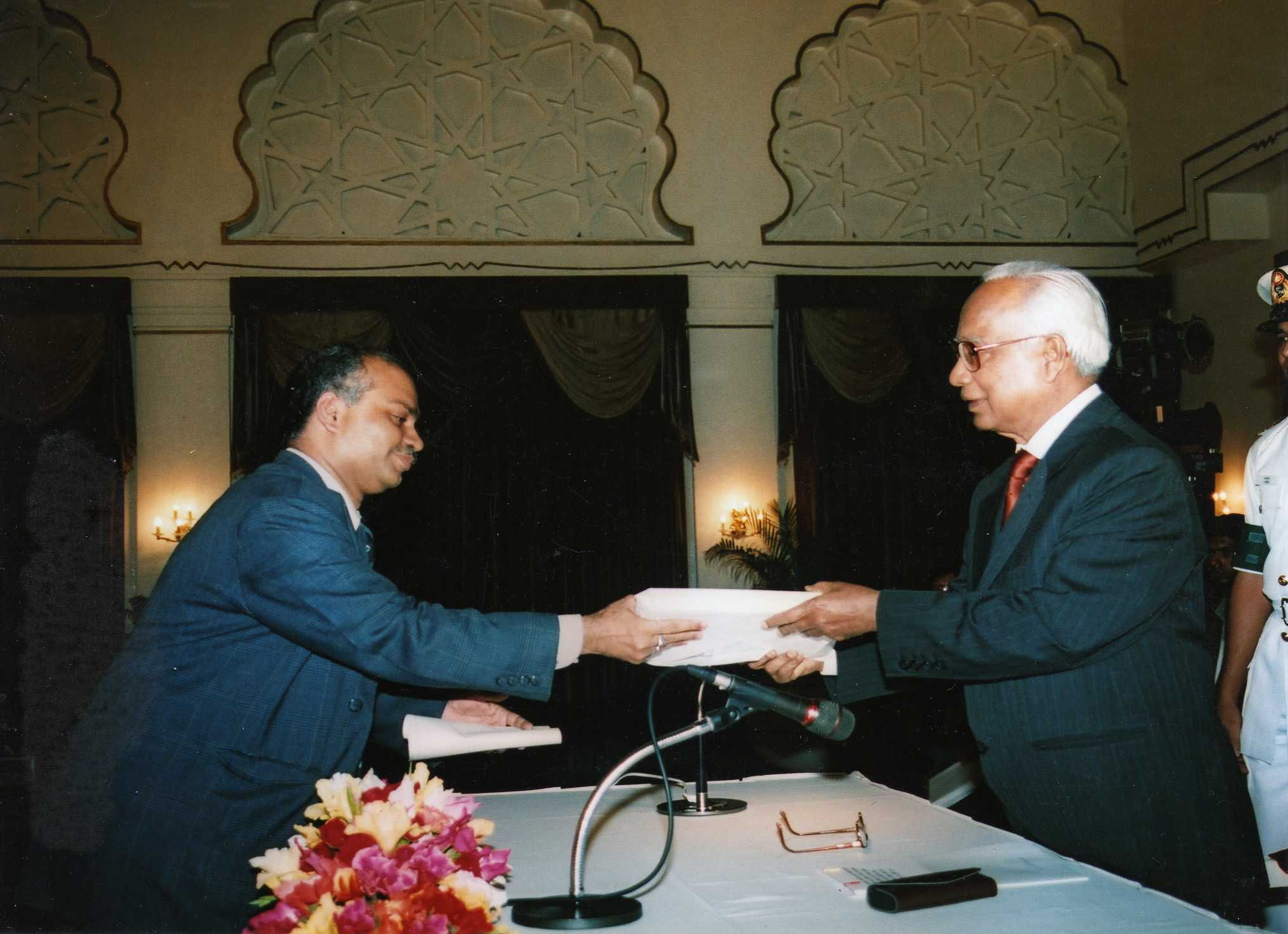
President presenting a book to Chowdhury, Thanksgiving 2006

- Hundred Years of Bangabhaban and Bangabhabaner Shatabarsha were published from Bangabhaban, where Chowdhury was the publisher, as the head of press wing of President's Office.
- Samakalin Sangbadikata (Contemporary Journalism), 2006.
- Protocoler Nigor (Bindings in Protocol), 2006.
- "A Unique Military Intervention in Bangladesh" 2021.
- Crisis in Governance: Military Rule in Bangladesh During 2007-2008, 2019.
