= Hossain Zillur Rahman =

Bangladeshi politician

- হোসেন জিল্লুর রহমান
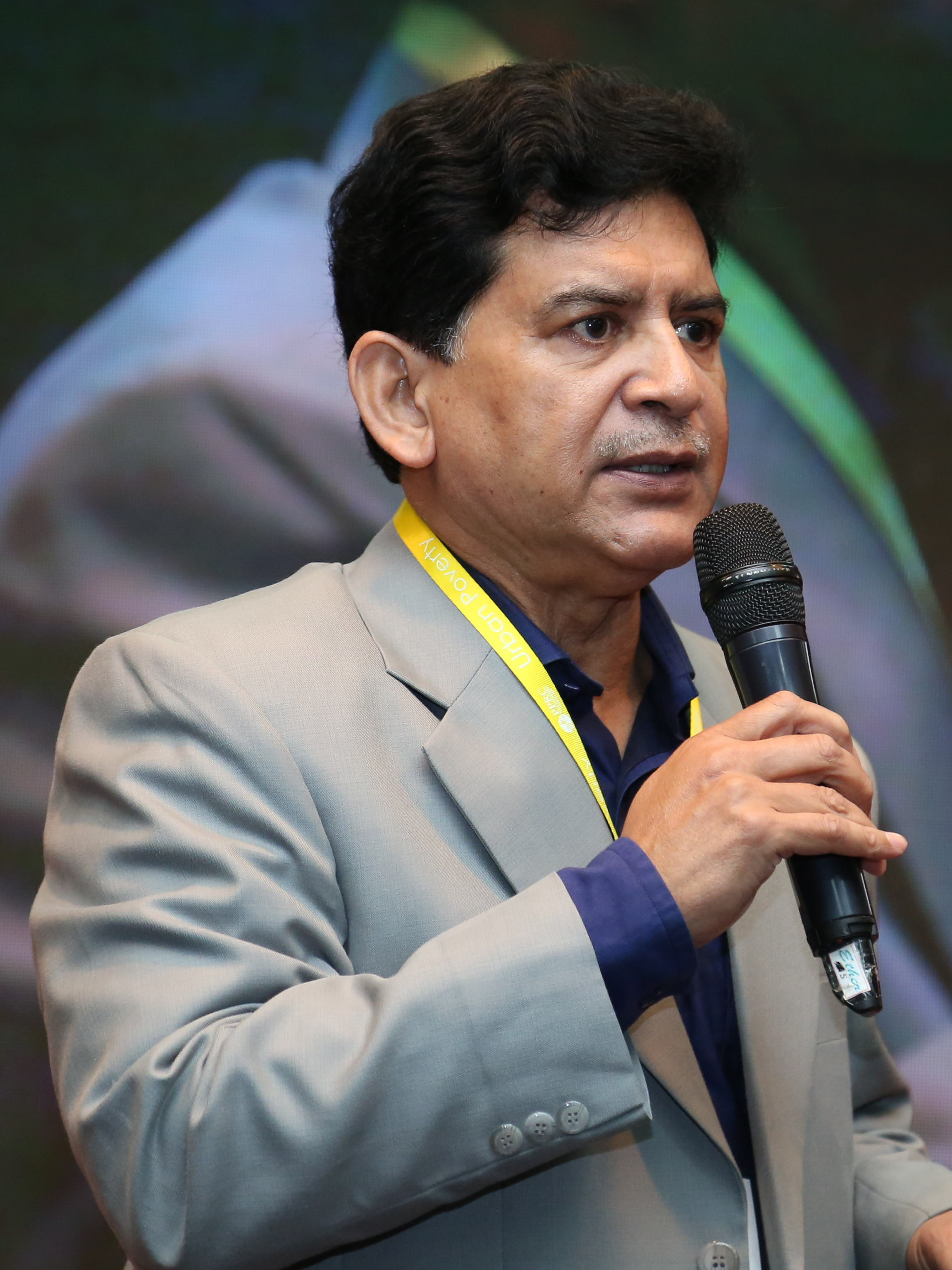
- Rahman in 2016
- Born: 26 July 1951 (age 75); Chittagong, East Bengal, Dominion of Pakistan
- Education: University of Dhaka; University of Manchester
- Spouse: Mahbuba Haque

Hossain Zillur Rahman is an academic, economist and policy maker from Bangladesh. He led the drafting of the poverty reduction strategy of the government in 2005 and was a member of the Independent South Asian Commission on Poverty Alleviation (ISACPA). He founded the Dhaka-based think-tank Power and Participation Research Centre (PPRC) in 1996 and prior to that was for over twenty years a leading researcher at the Bangladesh Institute of development Studies.

On 9 January 2008, he was appointed as an adviser (cabinet minister) to the Caretaker Government of Bangladesh, led by Fakhruddin Ahmed and was entrusted with the ministries of commerce and education. He served in this capacity till evening of 6 January 2009. He was an Inspire Fellow at the Institute for Global Leadership at Tufts University, US and was awarded the Dr. John Meyer Global Citizenship Award by the Institute in November 2009.

In 2013, he was awarded gold medal by Rotary International Bangladesh. Currently the Executive Chairman of Power and Participation Research Centre (PPRC).

== Education ==
Born in Chittagong, Hossain Zillur Rahman took his Senior Cambridge examinations from the P.A.F. College, Sargodha in Pakistan and higher secondary certificate from Faujdarhat Cadet College in Chittagong, Bangladesh. He studied economics at the Dhaka University for his bachelor's and master's degrees. He received his PhD in sociology from the Manchester University in 1986. His PhD research focused on the sociology of colonial rule and emergence of the state in Bangladesh.

== Works and achievement ==
Hossain Zillur Rahman was for twenty years a researcher at the Bangladesh Institute of Development Studies (BIDS) before founding the independent think tank Power and Participation Research Centre (PPRC) in 1996. He worked on Board of Advisors of Digital Network, a think tank on Information Technology.

He was made an Advisor (cabinet minister) in the Caretaker Government of Bangladesh in 2008.

Dr. Hossain Zillur Rahman is currently elected as chairperson of BRAC.

Dr. Hossain Zillur Rahman is currently a senior trustee at the Global Board of BRAC.

== Assignment in the Caretaker government ==
On 9 January 2008, Hossain Zillur Rahman was appointed as an Advisor to the Caretaker government of Bangladesh that was established on 11 January 2007. On 10 January 2008 portfolio of the advisers was redistributed and he was given the charge of the Ministry of Commerce as well as the Ministry of Education. On appointment as an advisor to the government, Rahman commented : "We have taken up the tasks in a critical times. But we can succeed if we work together." He also added : "Reforms are going on at the national level. Prices are rising on the international market.... The main dimension of work was thought to be political, but now it seems it is economy-oriented." "We will try to work together. Let's see what happens," he added.

== Power and Participation Research Centre ==
Power and Participation Research Centre (PPRC)
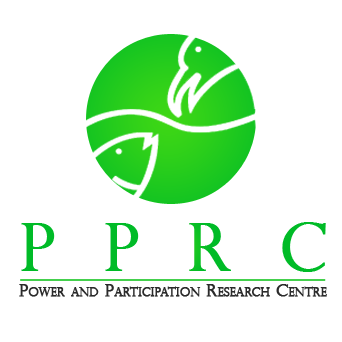
- Founded: 1996; 30 years ago in Dhaka, Bangladesh
- Founder: Hossain Zillur Rahman
- Headquarters: House 15, Road 12, Dhanmondi, Dhaka, Bangladesh
- Key people: Hossain Zillur Rahman, Executive Chairman
- Website: pprc-bd.org

The Power and Participation Research Centre (PPRC) established in 1996 Is an independent non profit centre for research and social action based in Dhaka, Bangladesh. PPRC is focused on issues of public policy, knowledge management and citizen empowerment. The centre works through nurturing strong networks within grass-root and policy circles and promotes a research culture that values excellence and relevance.

Activities of the Centre encompass policy research, project evaluations, quality statistics, discourse promotion, polity advocacy, grass-roots and policy networking, and rapid response initiatives on issues of national urgency. Its founder and chairman is Hossain Zillur Rahman.

== Family ==
Hossain Zillur Rahman has 3 daughters with his wife Mahbuba Haque.

== Publications ==
- Rethinking Rural Poverty: Bangladesh as a Case Study, 1995, (with Mahbub Hossain) SAGE International India Pvt.Ltd.
- Local Governance and Community Capacities : Search for New Frontiers, (Hossain Zillur Rahman with S. Aminul Islam), 2002: University Press Limited, Dhaka.
- Governance and State Effectiveness in Asia, 2006 (with Mark Robinson), Power and Participation Research Centre (Dhaka, Bangladesh) & IDS (Sussex)
- Researching Poverty From the Bottom Up, Reflections on the Experience of the Programme for Research on Poverty Alleviation 1994–2002, edited by Hossion Zillur Rahman with Khondoker Shakhawat Ali, PPRC and Grameen Trust, 2007, Dhaka.
- Unbundling Governance: Indices, Institutions, Solutions, 2007, Power and Participation Research Centre (Dhaka, Bangladesh)
- Bangladesh Urban Dynamics, 2012, Power and Participation Research Centre (Dhaka, Bangladesh)
- Social Protection in Bangladesh, 2014, (with David Hulme et al.), University Press Limited, Dhaka
- Rethinking Local Governance towards a Livelihoods Focus, 2001: Power and Participation Research Centre.
