= Golam Kader =

Bangladeshi politician

- Military career
- Allegiance: Bangladesh; Pakistan (Before 1971)
- Branch: Bangladesh Army; Pakistan Army
- Service years: 1961–1996
- Rank: Major General
- Unit: Corps of Signals
- Commands: Director General of National Security Intelligence; ENC of Army Headquarters; MGO of Army Headquarters; Commandant of School of Military Intelligence; Commander of 86th Independent Signals Brigade
- Conflicts: Bangladesh Liberation War

Golam Kader is a retired two star rank Bangladesh Army officer and advisor of the caretaker government led by Fakhruddin Ahmed.

== Career ==
Kader served as the director general of National Security Intelligence. He retired from the Bangladesh Army with the rank of major general. On 9 January 2008 he was appointed an advisor of the caretaker government led by Fakhruddin Ahmed. He was in charge of the Ministry of communication.
