= Hindu Religious Welfare Trust =

Bangladeshi government agency

- হিন্দু ধর্মীয় কল্যাণ ট্রাস্ট
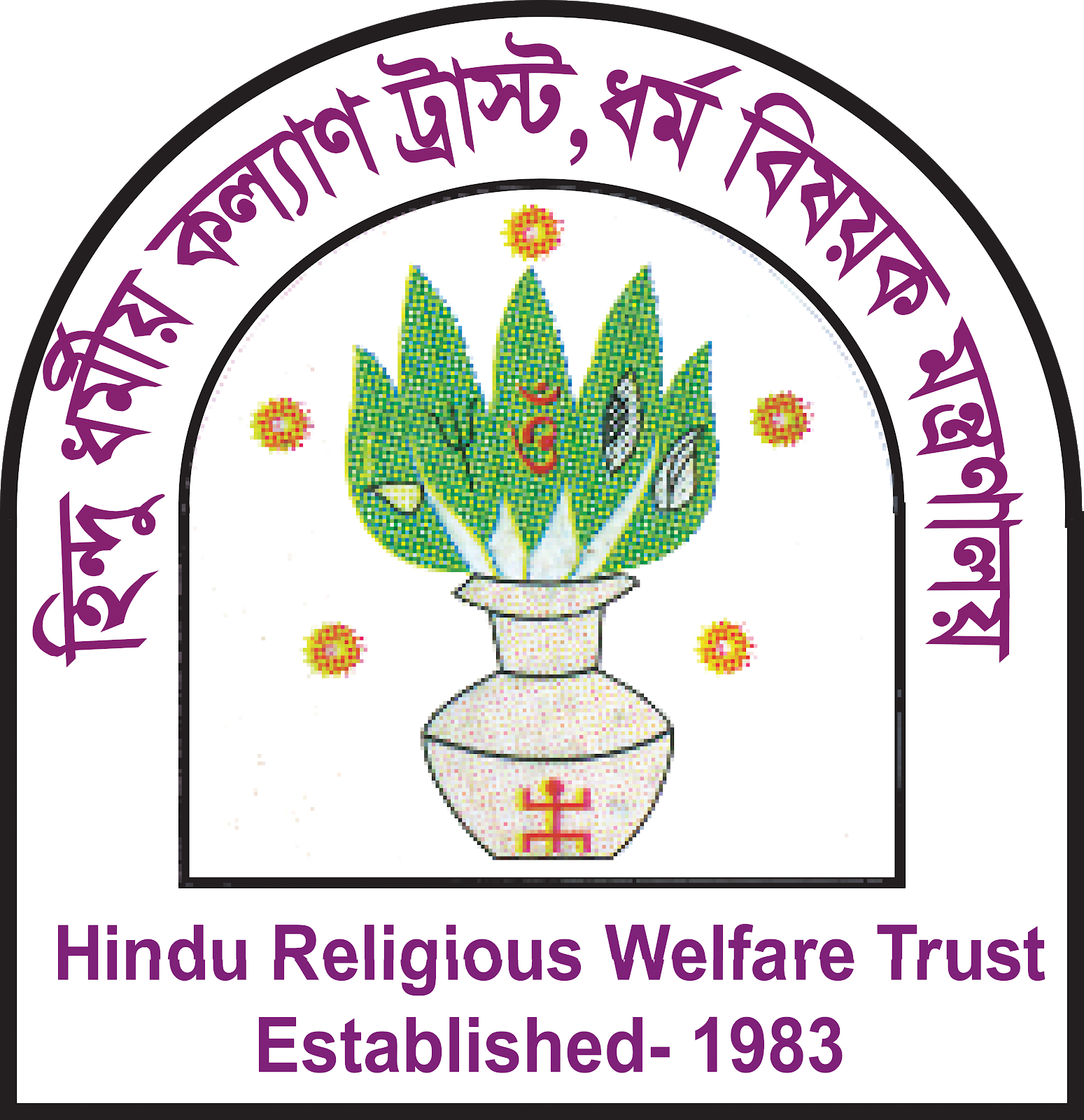
- Logo of Hindu Religious Welfare Trust
- Formation: 1983; 43 years ago
- Type: Government trust for Hindu religious welfare, education, publication, and research
- Legal status: Statutory government trust
- Purpose: To promote the welfare of the Hindu community and the maintenance of Hindu religious institutions, including support for religious, educational, and cultural activities.
- Headquarters: Dhaka, Bangladesh
- Region served: Bangladesh
- Official language: Bengali
- Chairman: A F M Khalid Hossain
- Vice-Chairman: Shri Tapan Chandra Majumder
- Secretary: Shri Debendra Nath Urao
- Parent organization: Ministry of Religious Affairs
- Budget: Allocated by Government
- Website: www.hindutrust.gov.bd

Hindu Religious Welfare Trust is a national government trust under the Ministry of Religious Affairs of Bangladesh, dedicated to promoting the welfare of the Hindu community. It supports the maintenance and renovation of Hindu temples and religious institutions, provides assistance for educational, cultural, and religious activities, and is headquartered in Dhaka, Bangladesh.

== History ==
The Hindu Religious Welfare Trust was established in 1983. It is under the Ministry of Religious Affairs. In 2016-2017 budget session 2 billion taka was allocated to the trust by the finance ministry.
