= Bangladesh Hajj Office =

Bangladeshi regulatory agency for Hajj

- বাংলাদেশ হজ্জ অফিস
- Government Seal of Bangladesh

Agency overview
- Formed: 1971; 55 years ago
- Jurisdiction: Bangladesh
- Headquarters: Hajj Office, Dhaka, Bangladesh
- Agency executives: Muhammad Ariful Islam, Director, Hajj Office, Dhaka; Md. Jahirul Islam, Counsellor, Hajj Office, Jeddah
- Parent department: Government of Bangladesh
- Parent agency: Ministry of Religious Affairs
- Website: Hajj Office, Dhaka; Hajj Office, Jeddah

The Bangladesh Hajj Office is a Bangladesh government regulatory agency under the Ministry of Religious Affairs that is responsible for Hajj management in Bangladesh.

== History ==
Bangladesh Hajj is responsible for the regulation of the hajj in Bangladesh. It also has an office in Mecca. It is responsible for the management of Ashkona Hajj Camp, where pilgrims wait for their flight to Saudi Arabia.

=== Jeddah ===
Bangladesh Hajj office has a local office in Jeddah, Saudi Arabia. The office is responsible for providing support and aid to Bangladeshi pilgrims in Saudi Arabia.
