= National Academy for Primary Education =

Training institution in Bangladesh

- জাতীয় প্রাথমিক শিক্ষা একাডেমি (নেপ)
- Logo of National Academy for Primary Education
- Abbreviation: NAPE
- Formation: 1978
- Headquarters: Mymensingh, Bangladesh
- Region served: Bangladesh
- Official language: Bengali
- Director Genarel: Forid Ahmed
- Website: National Academy for Primary Education

The National Academy for Primary Education (NAPE) is a Bangladesh Government academy responsible for providing training and conducting research in the field of primary education in Bangladesh and is located in Mymensingh. It is one of 25 key government administration training institutions.

== History ==
The academy was established in 1978 as the Academy for Fundamental Education. It was renamed in 1985 as the National Academy for Primary Education. It is under the Ministry of Primary and Mass Education. The director general of the National Academy of Primary Education, Fazlur Rahman, was killed in road crash on 13 May 2017.
