= Buddhist Religious Welfare Trust =

Autonomous government body located in Dhaka, Bangladesh

- বৌদ্ধ ধর্মীয় কল্যাণ ট্রাস্ট
- Formation: 1984; 42 years ago
- Type: Government trust for Buddhist religious welfare, education, publication, and research activities.
- Legal status: Statutory government trust
- Purpose: To ensure the welfare of the Buddhist community and support the maintenance of Buddhist temples and related religious, educational, and cultural activities.
- Headquarters: Dhaka, Bangladesh
- Region served: Bangladesh
- Official language: Bengali
- Chairman: A F M Khalid Hossain
- Vice-Chairman: Bhavesh Chakma
- Secretary: Joydatta Barua
- Parent organization: Ministry of Religious Affairs
- Budget: Allocated by Government
- Website: Buddhist Religious Welfare Trust

Buddhist Religious Welfare Trust is a national government trust under the Ministry of Religious Affairs of Bangladesh, dedicated to promoting the welfare of the Buddhist community. It supports the maintenance and renovation of Buddhist temples and religious institutions, provides assistance for educational, cultural, and religious activities, and is headquartered in Dhaka, Bangladesh.

== History ==
Buddhist Religious Welfare Trust was established in 1984. It was placed under the Ministry of Religious Affairs. It is headquartered in Kamalapur Dharmarajika Bauddha Vihara in Kamalapur, Dhaka. The trust was established under the Buddhist Religious Welfare Trust Ordinance, 1983. The trust received 30 million taka from the government for its 2012 budget.
