= Geetiara Safya Chowdhury =

Bangladeshi politician

Geetiara Shafia Choudhury
- গীতিআরা সাফিয়া চৌধুরী

Advisor of Caretaker Government
- In office 12 January 2007 – 8 January 2008

Personal details
- Spouse: Nazim Kamran Choudhury

Geetiara Shafia Choudhury is a Bangladeshi businesswoman and former advisor of the caretaker government led by Fakhruddin Ahmed. She is the chairperson of ADCOMM.

== Career ==
In 1978, Choudhury became the first female member of the Dhaka Club. She was an advisor of the caretaker government led by Fakhruddin Ahmed. She was in charge of the Ministry of Industry, Ministry of Textiles and Jute, Ministry of Social Welfare, and Ministry of Women and Children Affairs.

== Personal life ==
Geetiara Shafia Choudhury is married to Nazim Kamran Choudhury, a former Jatiya Sangsad member. Her cousin is married to Fakhruddin Ahmed.
