= Nazim Kamran Choudhury =

Bangladeshi politician

Personal details
- Political party: Bangladesh Nationalist Party

Nazim Kamran Choudhury is a Bangladesh Nationalist Party politician and a former Member of Parliament for constituency Sylhet-9.

== Career ==
He is a former member of Parliament from Bangladesh Nationalist Party. He was elected from Sylhet. He was sued in 2007 for attempting to grab an apartment in Gulshan, Dhaka. He was arrested in 2009 by Bangladesh Police. He is the Managing Director at Nazimgarh Resorts in Sylhet.

== Personal life ==
He is married to former adviser of Caretaker Government Geetiara Safya Chowdhury.
