= Md. Hamidul Haque =

Bangladeshi judge

- মো. হামিদুল হক

Justice of the High Court Division of Bangladesh

Personal details
- Profession: Judge

Md. Hamidul Haque was a Justice of the High Court Division of the Bangladesh Supreme Court. He was offered and declined the Chief Adviser of Bangladesh role during the 2006–2008 Bangladesh political crisis.

== Career ==
Hamidul Haque and Justice Salma Masud Chowdhury issued a verdict on 7 April 2003 which declared victims of torture by the government are entitled to compensation in the Bangladesh Legal Aid and Services Trust and others Vs Bangladesh.

Hamidul Haque was appointed as the Director General of the Judicial Administration Training Institute in 2004.

During the 2006–2008 Bangladesh political crisis, Hamidul Haque was offered the Chief Adviser of Bangladesh position of the Caretaker government of Bangladesh. After some consideration, he declined the position as BNP opposed his nomination.

Hamidul Haque published his book, Trial of Civil Suits and Criminal Cases, in 2011.
