= Chowdhury Sajjadul Karim =

Bangladeshi politician

Advisor of Caretaker Government

Personal details
- Born: 7 January 1948
- Died: 20 November 2015 (aged 67) Bangladesh Medical College Hospital, Dhaka, Bangladesh

Chowdhury Sajjadul Karim was a Bangladeshi nuclear physicist and former advisor of the caretaker government led by Fakhruddin Ahmed. He was in charge of the Ministry of Agriculture, Ministry of Fisheries and Livestock, and Ministry of Environment and Forest.

== Early life ==
Karim was born on 7 January 1948 at Mir Sharai, though his home district is Feni, East Bengal, British Raj.

== Career ==
He was a Bangladeshi nuclear physicist and chairman of the Bangladesh Atomic Energy Commission. He was also an inspector of the International Atomic Energy Agency. He was an advisor of the caretaker government led by Fakhruddin Ahmed. He was in charge of the Ministries of Agriculture, Fisheries and Livestock, and Environment and Forest. He was also the Advisor of Ministry of Water Resources during the caretaker government of Dr. Fakhruddin Ahmed.

== Death ==
He died on 20 November 2015 in Bangladesh Medical College Hospital, Dhaka, Bangladesh.
