= Christian Religious Welfare Trust =

Government-owned trust in Bangladesh

- খ্রিস্টান ধর্মীয় কল্যাণ ট্রাস্ট
- Formation: 2004; 22 years ago
- Type: Government trust for Christian religious welfare, education, and charitable activities
- Legal status: Statutory government trust
- Purpose: To ensure the welfare of the Christian community through the maintenance of Christian religious institutions and support for religious, educational, and social activities
- Headquarters: Dhaka, Bangladesh
- Region served: Bangladesh
- Official language: Bengali
- Chairman: A F M Khalid Hossain
- Parent organization: Ministry of Religious Affairs
- Budget: Allocated by Government
- Website: Christian Religious Welfare Trust

Christian Religious Welfare Trust is a government-owned trust operating under the Ministry of Religious Affairs of Bangladesh. It works for the welfare and socio-religious development of the Christian community by supporting the maintenance and development of Christian religious institutions and promoting religious, educational, and social activities. The trust is headquartered in Dhaka, Bangladesh.

== History ==
The trust was established in 2004 by the government of Bangladesh through the passage of Christian Religious Welfare Trust Ordinance. The trust is under the authority of the Ministry of Religious Affairs. In 2016, it received a 1 million taka funding from the government.
