= Akhon Samoy =

Newspaper in New York City, New York

The Akhon Samoy
- Front page of The Akhon Samoy on 15 September 2009
- Type: Weekly newspaper
- Format: Tabloid
- Editor: Kazi Shamsul Hoque
- Founded: 1 January 2000
- Language: Bengali
- Headquarters: 72-28 Roosevelt Ave; Jackson Heights; New York; United States
- Website: akhonsamoy.com

Akhon Samoy (Bengali: এখন সময়) is a Bengali-language newspaper published from New York, United States since 2000.

== History ==
The newspaper was founded on 1 January 2000, commemorating the 3rd millennium. Initially it was a monthly newspaper and then it was published in weekly basis from November 2000.

Kazi Shamsul Hoque is the founding editor of the newspaper.

== Speciality and awards ==
Akhon Samoy worked for the expatriate Bangladeshi living in the United States, especially, social issues, immigration issues and other community news are published objectively.

== See also ==
- List of New York City newspapers and magazines
- List of newspapers in New York
