= Office of the Waqf Administrator =

- বাংলাদেশ ওয়াক্‌ফ প্রশাসকের কার্যালয়
- Government Seal of Bangladesh

Agency overview
- Formed: 1988; 38 years ago
- Jurisdiction: Bangladesh
- Headquarters: 4 New Eskaton Road, Dhaka-1000
- Agency executives: Dr. Md. Golam Kabir, Waqf Administrator; Anisur Rahman, Deputy Administrator; Md. Mehdi Hasan, Deputy Administrator
- Parent department: Government of Bangladesh
- Parent agency: Ministry of Religious Affairs
- Website: www.waqf.gov.bd

The Office of the Waqf Administrator (Bengali: বাংলাদেশ ওয়াক্‌ফ প্রশাসকের কার্যালয়) is a Bangladesh government regulatory agency under the Ministry of Religious Affairs responsible for administration of Waqf properties. According to Islam, individuals can permanently donate movable or immovable property to charity and it is the responsibility to manage the Waqf and ensure its run according to the wish of the donor.

== History ==
In 1986, the Bangladesh Bureau of Statistics calculated that there were 150,593 Waqfs in Bangladesh. The government of Bangladesh established the Office of the Waqf Administrator to manage those properties. It replaced a smaller organization formed in 1962 by the Waqfs Ordinance. The administrator is responsible for managing 70,955 acres but it faces difficulty due to shortages in funding and personnel. On 6 November 2017, the Anti-Corruption Commission arrested an officer of the Office of the Administrator of Waqfs while he was taking a bribe.
