= Ayub Quadri =

Bangladeshi politician

- আইয়ুব কাদরী
- Born: March 16, 1946 (age 80); Chittagong, Bengal Presidency, British India
- Education: University of Dhaka; University of Connecticut

Ayub Quadri (born March 16, 1946) is a former advisor for the ministries of Education and Cultural Affairs to the interim Government of Bangladesh that assumed power on January 11, 2007. After serving as an advisor for 11 months, he resigned from the post over a scandal concerning artifact theft.

== Early life ==
Born in Chittagong, Bengal Presidency, British India, Quadri completed his Bachelor of Arts (Honours) and Master of Arts in English literature from Dhaka University in 1966. He obtained another master's degree in public affairs from University of Connecticut, US in 1983.

== Career ==
Quadri joined the then Pakistan Civil Service (CSP) in 1969 and served the government of East Pakistan and Bangladesh in different capacities for 36 years. His major portfolios as secretary of the government included Rural Development and Cooperative Division, Ministry of Fisheries and Livestock, Ministry of Food and Disaster Management, Ministry of Agriculture, Economic Relations Division (ERD), Ministry of Water Resources and Ministry of Industries. Quadri also served as Chairman of Bangladesh Chemical Industries Corporation (BCIC) and Director General of Bangladesh Rural Development Board (BRDB). He retired from the government service in 2005.

Quadri was appointed an advisor to the interim Government of Bangladesh headed by Fakhruddin Ahmed on January 16, 2007. He was given the responsibility for the Ministry of Education, Ministry of Primary and Mass Education as well as the Ministry of Cultural Affairs. His house came into attack of angry protesters seeking withdrawal of the state of emergency on August 21, 2007. On December 26, 2007 Quadri resigned from his position amid an inquiry into the theft of two rare archaeological artifacts. The antiques were lost while being boarded in a Paris-bound plane at the Dhaka airport, which was waiting to fly a consignment of antiques from Bangladesh for an exhibition at the Guimet Museum in Paris.
