= Directorate of Primary Education =

Bangladeshi governmental directorate

- Formation: 1981
- Headquarters: Dhaka, Bangladesh
- Region served: Bangladesh
- Official language: Bengali
- Website: Directorate of Primary Education

Directorate of Primary Education (Bengali: প্রাথমিক শিক্ষা অধিদপ্তর) is an autonomous government department responsible for the administration of primary schools in Bangladesh. It is also responsible for the training of primary school teachers in various training institutions operated by the directorate. It is located in Dhaka, Bangladesh. Director General Abu Hena Mostofa Kamal is the head of the Directorate of Primary Education.

== History ==
The government of Bangladesh under Sheikh Mujibur Rahman nationalized 37 thousand primary schools in Bangladesh in 1973 through the Primary Education (taking over) act, 1974. The Directorate of Primary Education was established in 1981 to manage the nationalized primary schools. In 2013, Prime Minister Sheikh Hasina nationalized 26 thousand more primary schools. Bangladesh has 126,615 primary schools, 540 thousand teachers and 18.6 million students.
