= National Freedom Fighter Council =

Bangladeshi government agency

- Headquarters: Dhaka, Bangladesh
- Region served: Bangladesh
- Official language: Bengali
- Website: Jatio Muktijoddha Council

The National Freedom Fighter Council (Bengali: জাতীয় মুক্তিযোদ্ধা কাউন্সিল) is an autonomous Bangladesh government council responsible for the welfare of "Freedom Fighters" and maintaining a list of the Freedom Fighters and is located in Magbazar, Dhaka, Bangladesh.

== History ==
The council was formed to look after the welfare of Mukti Bahini members who fought for Bangladesh in the Bangladesh War in 1971, under the Ministry of Liberation War Affairs. The council also regulates the usages of the term Bangladesh Liberation War to prevent exploitation. In 2015, the council decided to give Birangonas, women who were raped in the Bangladesh war, the status of freedom fighters including the associated benefits.

On 23 January 2017, Bangladesh High Court asked the government to explain why asking the council to investigate and removed "fake freedom fighters" is not illegal under the Jatiya Muktijoddha Council Act, 2002. The government formed local investigative units for this purpose on 12 January 2017.
