= Fazlul Haque (judge) =

Chief Adviser of Bangladesh in 2007

M. Fazlul Haque
- ম. ফজলুল হক
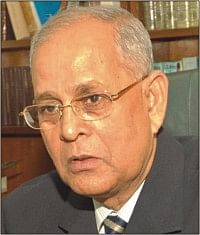

Acting Chief Adviser of Bangladesh
- In office 11 January 2007 – 12 January 2007
- President: Iajuddin Ahmed
- Preceded by: Iajuddin Ahmed
- Succeeded by: Fakhruddin Ahmed

Personal details
- Born: 30 June 1938 Bangaon, Bengal Presidency, British India
- Died: 16 November 2023 (aged 85) Dhaka, Bangladesh
- Party: Independent

Mohammad Fazlul Haque (Bengali: ম. ফজলুল হক, Fojlul Hoq) (30 June 1938 – 16 November 2023) was a Bangladeshi judge who served as the acting chief adviser of Bangladesh for one day before the appointment of the Fakhruddin Ahmed ministry in January 2007.

== Life and career ==
Fazlul Haque was born on 30 June 1938. He was appointed as one of the ten advisers of the non-party caretaker government of Bangladesh under the leadership of President and Chief Advisor Iajuddin Ahmed on October 31, 2006, the equivalent of a government minister, holding multiple portfolios.

During the political crisis in late 2006 when the Chief Adviser acted out of his own accord and decided to hold elections anyway even if Awami League didn't contest, Justice Fazlul Haque, along with other advisers, repeatedly held meetings fruitlessly with Awami League leaders to ensure fair elections in the January 22, 2007. although he did not resign en masse with the four advisers to protest against the difference in opinion with the Chief Adviser.

When the Chief Adviser finally consented to resign from office on January 11, 2007, Justice Fazlul Haque was appointed the new chief of the caretaker government until a replacement was available. The replacement, Fakhruddin Ahmed was available in a day, on January 12, thus completing the shortest tenure of a head of government in Bangladesh.

During 2008, he was charged by the Anti-Corruption Commission with hiding illegally acquired wealth. The court case against him lasted at least through 2017. His son confessed to corruption to the Truth and Accountability Commission.

Fazlul Haque died on 16 November 2023, at the age of 85.

Political offices
Preceded by Iajuddin Ahmed; Acting	Prime Minister of Bangladesh; Acting; 2007	Succeeded by Fakhruddin Ahmed; Acting
