= Ministry of Religious Affairs (Bangladesh) =

Government ministry of Bangladesh

- ধর্ম বিষয়ক মন্ত্রণালয়
- Government Seal of Bangladesh

Ministry overview
- Formed: 25 January 1980; 46 years ago
- Jurisdiction: Government of Bangladesh
- Headquarters: Bangladesh Secretariat, Dhaka-1000
- Annual budget: ৳2955 crore (US$240 million) (2026-2027)
- Minister responsible: Kazi Shah Mofazzal Hossain Kaikobad, Minister of Religious Affairs
- Minister of State responsible: Shamim Kaisar Lincoln
- Ministry executive: Md. Kamal Uddin, Secretary
- Child agencies: Bangladesh Hajj Office; Office of the Waqf Administrator; Islamic Foundation Bangladesh; Hindu Religious Welfare Trust; Buddhist Religious Welfare Trust; Christian Religious Welfare Trust
- Website: mora.gov.bd

The Ministry of Religious Affairs (Bengali: ধর্ম বিষয়ক মন্ত্রণালয়, romanized: Dhôrmô Biṣaẏak Montronaloy; abbreviated as MoRA) is a ministry of the Government of Bangladesh responsible for overseeing religious affairs, managing religious institutions and events, coordinating Hajj operations, and supporting the welfare, development, and administration of various religious communities and Waqf properties.

== History ==
The ministry is responsible for the management of Hajj and Umrah in Bangladesh. Biswa Ijtema is also managed by the ministry. The ministry gained some attention after using Arabic script to discourage public urination; since few Bangladeshis understand Arabic, anything written in Arabic is presumed to be sacred and not to be urinated on.

== Directorate ==
- Waqf Administration
- Christian Religious Welfare Trust
- Bangladesh Hajj Office
- Buddhist Religious Welfare Trust
- Islamic Foundation Bangladesh (Bengali: ইসলামিক ফাউন্ডেশন বাংলাদেশ) is a government organization established in 1975 under the ministry working to disseminate values and ideals of Islam and carry out activities related to those values and ideals. The Head Office of the Foundation is in Dhaka, which is supported by 6 divisional offices and 64 district offices, as well as 7 Imam Training Academy Centers and 29 Islamic Mission Centers. The Director General is the Chief Executive of the Foundation.
- Hindu Religious Welfare Trust is a statutory body under the ministry which is responsible for the welfare of the Hindu community and the maintenance of Hindu temples.

== See also ==
- Minister of Religious Affairs (Bangladesh)
