= A. S. M. Matiur Rahman =

Bangladeshi politician

A.S.M. Matiur Rahman
- Born: Lakshmipur, Noakhali
- Military career
- Allegiance: Bangladesh
- Branch: Bangladesh Army
- Service years: 1978–2005
- Rank: Major General
- Unit: Army Medical Corps
- Commands: CO of 17th Field Ambulance; CO of CMH, Rajshahi; Commandant of CMH, Savar; Commandant of CMH, Dhaka; Commandant of AFMC; Director General of Directorate General of Medical Services

A.S.M. Matiur Rahman is a retired two-star rank Bangladesh Army officer and advisor of the caretaker government led by Fakhruddin Ahmed. He has attended several conferences in countries around the world and was the former health, water and religion minister of Bangladesh

== Career ==
Rahman was a doctor who retired as a major general of the Bangladesh Army. He was the health and family welfare advisor in the caretaker government led by Fakhruddin Ahmed. He resigned from his post in January 2017. He is a part-time faculty member of North South University.
