= Iajuddin Ahmed =

President of Bangladesh from 2002 to 2009

- ইয়াজউদ্দিন আহম্মেদ
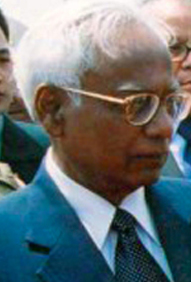
- Iajuddin in 2002

President of Bangladesh
- In office 6 September 2002 – 12 February 2009
- Prime Minister: Khaleda Zia; Himself (acting); Fazlul Haque (acting); Fakhruddin Ahmed (acting); Sheikh Hasina
- Preceded by: Muhammad Jamiruddin Sircar (acting)
- Succeeded by: Zillur Rahman

Chief Adviser of Bangladesh
- In office 29 October 2006 – 11 January 2007
- President: Himself
- Preceded by: Khaleda Zia (as Prime Minister)
- Succeeded by: Fazlul Haque (acting)

Chairman of the Bangladesh Public Service Commission
- In office 14 September 1991 – 31 January 1993
- Appointed by: Shahabuddin Ahmed
- President: Shahabuddin Ahmed; Abdur Rahman Biswas
- Preceded by: S. M. Al Hussaini
- Succeeded by: S. M. A. Foyaz

Chairman of the University Grants Commission
- In office 8 April 1995 – 7 April 1999
- Preceded by: Shamsul Hoque
- Succeeded by: A.T.M. Jahirul Hoque

Personal details
- Born: 1 February 1931 Bikrampur, Bengal, British India
- Died: 10 December 2012 (aged 81) Bangkok, Thailand
- Resting place: Banani Graveyard
- Party: Independent
- Spouse: Anwara Begum (m. 1953)
- Children: 3
- Education: University of Dhaka; University of Wisconsin–Madison

Iajuddin Ahmed (Note: Bengali: ইয়াজুদ্দিন আহমেদ, romanized: Iājuddin Ahméd [ˈiɑd͡ʒudːin ˈaɦmed]) (1 February 1931 – 10 December 2012) was the president of Bangladesh, serving from 2002 to 2009.

With a doctorate in soil science, Ahmed became a full professor at the University of Dhaka and chairman of the department. Beginning in 1991, he started accepting appointments to public positions, as chairman of the Public Service Commission (1991 to 1993) and of the University Grants Commission (1995 to 1999). In 2002, he won election as president. In 2004, he helped establish the private university, Atish Dipankar University of Science and Technology (ADUST).

== Early life and education ==
Ahmed was born on 1 February 1931 to a Bengali family in the village of Nayagaon in Bikrampur, Bengal Presidency. He was the son of the Muslim cleric Maulavi Muhammad Ibrahim. Ahmed passed his matriculation from Munshiganj High School in 1948 and his Intermediate of Arts from Haraganga College from Munshiganj in 1950. He obtained his B.Sc and M.Sc from the Department of Geology, University of Dacca in 1952 and 1954, respectively. He later received his MS and PhD degrees in 1958 and 1962, respectively, from the University of Wisconsin–Madison in the United States.

== Teaching ==
Returning to the University of Dhaka, Ahmed joined the faculty as an assistant professor in the Department of Soil Science. He moved up in the ranks until he became a full professor in the department. He held the posts at the university of chairman of the Soil Science Department of Dhaka University and dean of the Faculty of Biological Science, Dhaka University. He was also provost of Salimullah Muslim Hall.

Ahmed is credited with developing a process that preserved nutrients in soil and later released them according to the needs of the vegetation. In 1984, Professor Ahmed was a visiting professor at Cornell University in the United States and the German Technical University and University of Göttingen in Germany.

== Political career ==
Ahmed was an adviser in the caretaker government of 1991. He was also chairman of the Public Service Commission from 1991 to 1993. He served as chairman of the University Grants Commission from 1995 to 1999.

During the 1990s, Professor Ahmed was the president of the Federation of University Teachers Association in Bangladesh (FUTA). He led the anti-autocratic movement.

=== Presidency ===
Ahmed became President of Bangladesh in 2002 after becoming the only candidate to register for presidential elections. By that time, the position of prime minister was considered the top political role in the Bangladesh government.

During his presidency, Ahmed directed the writing and publication of two books about the nation, Hundred Years of Bangabhaban and Bangabhabaner Shatabarsha. These were published in 2006 by Bangabhaban's press wing, under the initiative of his advisor, Mukhlesur Rahman Chowdhury.

=== Chief Advisor, 2006–2007 Caretaker Government ===
According to the constitution, the immediate past Chief Justice is appointed as Chief Advisor during a caretaker government. After Justice KM Hasan declined the position, reportedly because of ill health, five other men were considered for the position. The last option was for the President to take over, as provided for in the constitution. Ahmed was sworn in as the Chief Advisor of the Caretaker Government at 8:00 pm (Bangladesh standard time) on 29 October 2006 after the main political parties failed to agree on another candidate. The opposition parties resisted his appointment, because he had been elected by the majority-BNP parliament. Iajuddin Ahmed as Chief Advisor was to oversee the forthcoming elections, planned for 22 January 2007, while continuing his responsibilities as president.

Sheikh Hasina of the Awami League and her allies demanded Ahmed's resignation, but he declined. At first, the Awami League and its allies announced they would boycott the planned election because of BNP influence.

The President's advisor, Mukhlesur Rahman Chowdhury, met with Sheikh Hasina and Khaleda Zia in an attempt to convince both parties to take part in the election. Finally on 23 December, they both agreed to participate in the 22 January 2007 polls. At the last minute, on 3 January, Awami League and its allies withdrew from the election, jeopardising the country's stability. The European Union and UN withdrew its election overseers.

Concerned that a one-party election would jeopardise the nation's lucrative participation in United Nations' peacekeeping mission and that the caretaker government would have difficulty resisting takeover by the BNP, the military intervened on 11 January 2007. A group including General Moeen U Ahmed, Army Chief, persuaded Iajuddin Ahmed to declare a state of emergency and resign, appointing an Interim Chief Advisor. Opponents of the military intervention were concerned about the threat to democracy, but many others were relieved to have professional technocrats leading efforts to stabilise the country and reduce corruption in the government. On 12 January, Fakruddin, formerly with the World Bank, was appointed as Chief Advisor.

=== Resignation as Chief Adviser ===
On 11 January 2007, President Ahmed resigned from his position as Chief Advisor of the Caretaker Government, having already received the resignations of his advisors. He retained his position as president and responsibilities for the Defense Ministry in the caretaker government. He issued a statement acknowledging that the Election Commission and his government had been unable to achieve an election. He appointed the former Justice Fazlul Haque as Interim Chief Advisor and imposed a state of emergency. The next day, in consultation with the military, Ahmed appointed Fakhruddin Ahmed as the new Chief Advisor. He is a prominent banker who had been with the World Bank and Bangladesh National Bank.

Iajuddin Ahmed's term as president was due to end on 5 September 2007. The government announced at that time that he would remain in office until after the national election (planned by then to be held by late 2008). This was to elect new members of parliament, who would elect a president.

The Awami League and its Grand Alliance won two-thirds of the seats in parliament. It formed a government in 2009, headed by Sheikh Hasina as prime minister. Ahmed left office on 12 February 2009, after Zillur Rahman, an Awami League leader, was sworn in to succeed him as President of Bangladesh.

== Bypass operation ==
On the afternoon of 23 May 2006, President Ahmed was admitted to the Combined Military Hospital (CMH) in Dhaka. Sources said he was seriously ill and being treated by a team of elite doctors. On their advice, President Ahmed was taken to Singapore on Wednesday, 24 May 2006. The 75-year-old president underwent a successful by-pass heart operation at the Mount Elizabeth Hospital in Singapore. During President Ahmed's illness and recovery, in May–July 2006, rumours were reported in the media that he had died, or was going to be removed.

== Personal life ==
Ahmed and his second wife, Anwara Begum, adopted a son, Imtiaz Ahmed Babu. Ahmed also has children from his first marriage: Susan and Adam. He has a total of four grandchildren: Aurora, Beryl, Adam and Arin.

Imtiaz Babu was arrested on 9 January 2012 on assault charges, for having attacked the registrar at ADUST, a private university founded by his father. Babu is on the trustee board of ADUST.

== Illness and death ==
Ahmed had additional heart surgery on 28 October 2012. After developing kidney-related complications, he spent more than a month on life support before dying on 10 December 2012 at Bumrungrad International Hospital in Bangkok, Thailand.

Statements of mourning were issued by President Zillur Rahman, Prime Minister Sheikh Hasina, Leader of the Opposition Khaleda Zia and former Advisor to the President Mukhles Chowdhury. Iajudiin Ahmed's body was transported to Dhaka from Bangkok on 12 December 2012.

Four namaz-e-janazas were held for him. His first was held in Bangkok on 11 December 2012, the second namaz-e-janaza at his ancestral home in Munshiganj on 13 December, the third janaza in Dhaka University Central Masjid, and the fourth and last one was at Baitul Mukarram national masjid. Ahmed was buried in Banani graveyard.

Political offices
Preceded by Muhammad Jamiruddin Sircar	President of Bangladesh; 2002–2009	Succeeded by Zillur Rahman
Preceded by Khaleda Zia	Prime Minister of Bangladesh; Acting; 2006–2007	Succeeded by Fazlul Haque; Acting
Preceded by Morshed Khan	Minister of Foreign Affairs; 2006–2007	Succeeded by Iftekhar Ahmed Chowdhury
