= Fakhruddin Ahmed =

Chief Adviser of Bangladesh from 2007 to 2009

- ফখরুদ্দীন আহমেদ
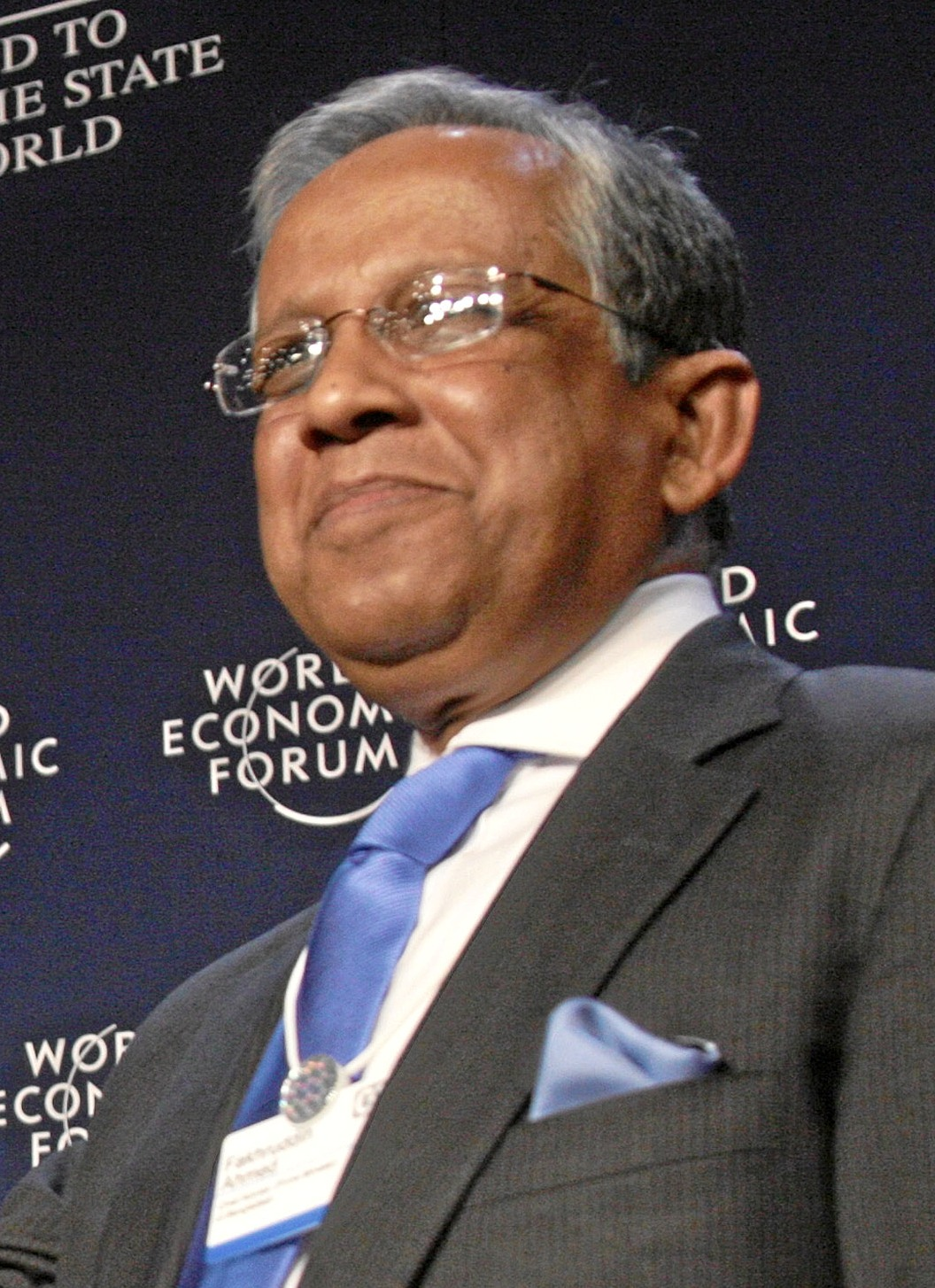
- Ahmed at the World Economic Forum (2008)

Chief Adviser of Bangladesh
- In office 12 January 2007 – 6 January 2009
- President: Iajuddin Ahmed
- Preceded by: Fazlul Haque (acting)
- Succeeded by: Sheikh Hasina (as Prime Minister)

Governor of Bangladesh Bank
- In office 29 November 2001 – 30 April 2005
- President: Iajuddin Ahmed
- Preceded by: Mohammed Farashuddin
- Succeeded by: Salehuddin Ahmed

Personal details
- Born: 1 May 1940 (age 86) Tongibari, Bengal, British India
- Spouse: Neena Ahmed
- Children: 1
- Education: Williams College; University of Dhaka; Princeton University (Ph.D.)

Fakhruddin Ahmed (Bengali: ফখরুদ্দীন আহমেদ, romanized: Fokhruddin Ahmed; born 1 May 1940) is a Bangladeshi economist and civil servant who served as the chief adviser of Bangladesh from 2007 to 2009. He previously served as governor of Bangladesh Bank, the country's central bank.

On 12 January 2007, he was appointed Chief Adviser (head of the government) of the non-political caretaker government, during the 2006–2008 Bangladeshi political crisis. He remained in that position for nearly two years, exceeding the customary tenure, until the elections were held on 29 December 2008.

== Early life and education ==
Ahmed was born on 1 May 1940 in Rob Nagorkandi, Tongibari, Munshiganj to Mohiuddin Ahmed. He passed his Matriculation exam from Mathbaria High School, Pirojpur, in 1955 and later passed Intermediate exam from Dhaka College in 1957.

He studied economics at Dhaka University, where he obtained his BA (Hons) and MA in 1960 and 1961, respectively, standing first in his class both times. He earned a master's degree in development economics from Williams College and a Ph.D. in economics from Princeton University in 1975. His doctoral dissertation was titled "Migration and employment in a multisector model; an application to Bangladesh".

== Career ==
Ahmed began his professional career as a lecturer in Economics at Dhaka University. He served in the erstwhile Civil Service of Pakistan between 1963 and 1978, where he was Assistant Commissioner, Sylhet; Subdivisional Officer in Moulvibazar; Additional Deputy Commissioner, Mymensingh; Deputy Secretary, the Services and General Administration Department and Deputy Secretary to the East Pakistan Cabinet; and after independence Joint Secretary to the Economic Relations Department in the Ministry of Finance, Government of Bangladesh.

From November 1978, Ahmed joined the World Bank where he served for two decades.

=== Governor of Bangladesh Bank ===
Ahmed served as the 8th governor of Bangladesh Bank from October 2001 to April 2005.

=== Post-retirement ===
After retirement from the governor of Bangladesh Bank, he then became managing director of the Palli Karma-Sahayak Foundation (PKSF), the country's apex micro-finance organisation, beginning on 1 June 2005.

== Chief Adviser of Bangladesh (2007–2009) ==
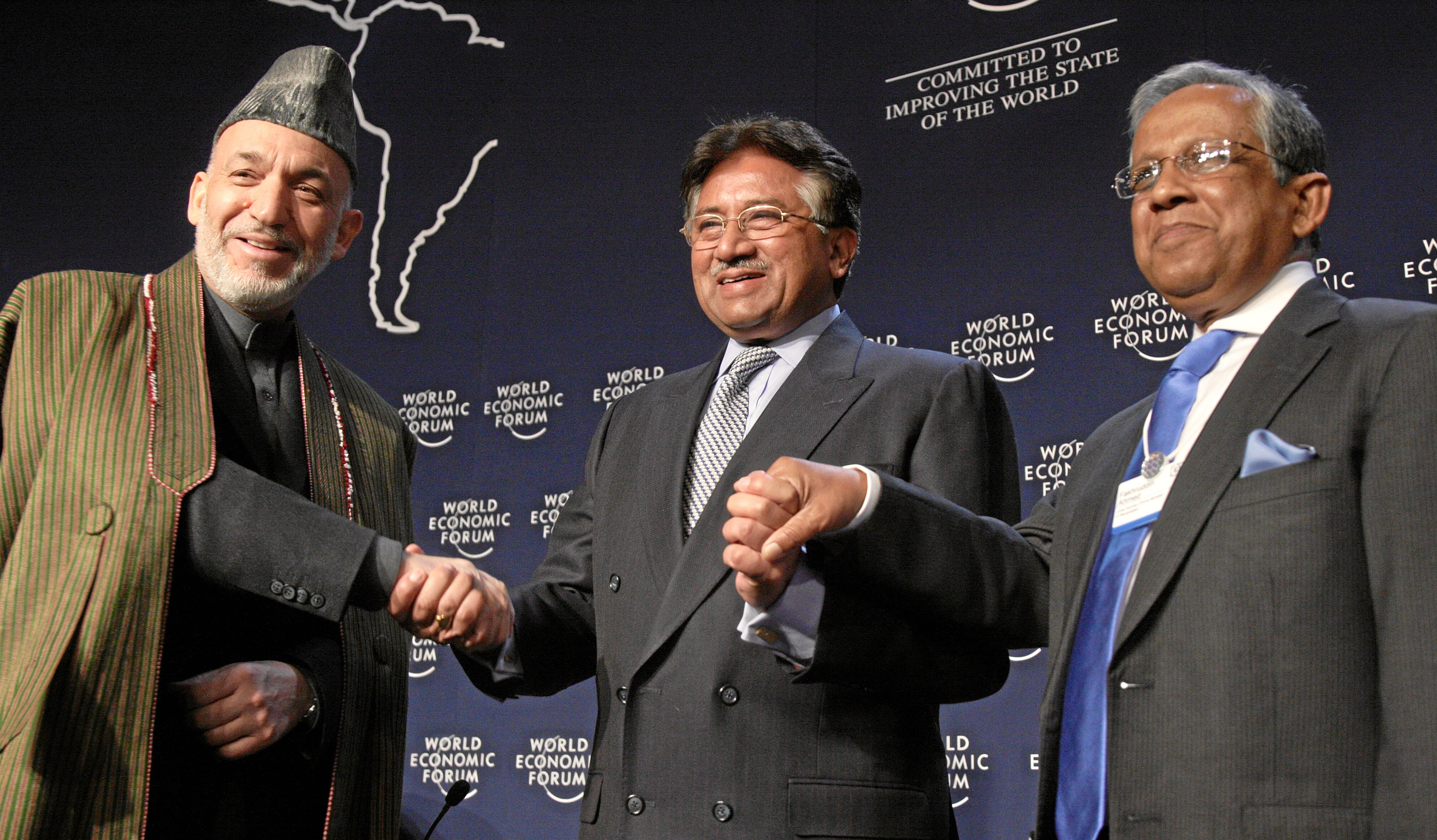
Hamid Karzai, Pervez Musharraf and Fakhruddin Ahmed at the Annual Meeting 2008 of the World Economic Forum in Davos, Switzerland

On 12 January 2007, President Iajuddin Ahmed swore him in as chief adviser of the caretaker government, after the former interim government under the president was dissolved. Fakhruddin Ahmed is credited with bringing an end to the anarchy that had threatened to sweep the nation.

More than 160 senior politicians, top civil servants, and security officials were arrested on charges of graft and other economic crimes. Included were former ministers from the two main political parties, the Bangladesh Awami League and the Bangladesh Nationalist Party, including former prime ministers Sheikh Hasina and Khaleda Zia, and the former acting chief adviser Fazlul Haque. On January 11, 2007, the then President Iajuddin Ahmed declared a state of emergency in the country in view of the chaotic situation created by the political parties. At the same time, a caretaker government backed by the army was formed with Fakhruddin Ahmed as its chief adviser. With the assumption of power by Fakhruddin Ahmed, the caretaker government formed with the President as the Chief Adviser was dissolved. After assuming office, Fakhruddin Ahmed was highly praised for his significant contribution to reducing political and social unrest in the then national life. At that time, Fakhruddin Ahmed conducted various anti-corruption activities in Bangladesh, known as the most corrupt country in the world. At that time, about 160 politicians, government officials, security officials were sued on charges of embezzlement and other corruption.

Ahmed fainted while giving a speech at a tree-planting event on 3 June 2007, apparently due to the heat, and was hospitalized. He was released from the hospital later the same day and has said that he was well.

The Jatiya Sangsad elections were held on 29 December 2008 and the Awami League won two-thirds of the seats. Which marked the end of the Fakhruddin Ahmed ministry.

Ahmed has since retired from the public sphere and is now living in the United States.

Political offices
| Preceded by Fazlul Haque; Acting | Chief Adviser of Bangladesh; 2007–2009 | Succeeded by Sheikh Hasina |
