= List of international trips made by prime ministers of Canada =

The following is a list of international prime ministerial trips made by prime ministers of Canada in chronological order since the start of Brian Mulroney's first term in 1984.

== Brian Mulroney (1984–1993) ==
Brian Mulroney, the 18th prime minister of Canada, had made 19 international trips to 11 countries during his premiership.

== Kim Campbell (1993) ==
Country	Location	Date	Details
Japan	Tokyo	July 7–9	Attended the 19th G7 summit.

== Jean Chrétien (1993–2003) ==
Jean Chrétien, the 20th prime minister of Canada, had made 33 trips to 21 countries during his premiership.

== Paul Martin (2003–2006) ==
Paul Martin, the 21st prime minister of Canada, had made 12 trips to 12 countries during his premiership.

== Stephen Harper (2006–2015) ==
Stephen Harper, the 22nd prime minister of Canada, had made 49 trips to 30 countries during his premiership.

== Justin Trudeau (2015–2025) ==
Countries visited by Justin Trudeau during his premiership

Justin Trudeau, the 23rd prime minister of Canada, had made 96 trips to 50 countries during his premiership. In 2017 he became first Prime Minister to participate in East Asia Summit. In 2022, he became the first incumbent prime minister to visit Rwanda. In 2024, Trudeau became the first incumbent prime minister to visit Laos.

== Mark Carney (2025–present) ==
World map highlighting countries visited by Mark Carney during his premiership, as of November 2026

Mark Carney, the 24th and current prime minister of Canada, has made 29 trips to 32 countries since his premiership. In 2026, Carney became the first incumbent prime minister to visit Saint-Pierre and Miquelon.

== Table of destinations ==
Twenty sitting Canadian prime ministers have traveled to at least one foreign country or dependent territory.

Region	Country or territory	NV	Prime Minister and year of visit (Note: column sorts by year of first visit, not by prime minister's name.)
East Africa	Ethiopia	2	Jean Chrétien 2003 • Justin Trudeau 2022
East Africa	Kenya	1	Pierre Trudeau 1981
East Africa	Rwanda	1	Justin Trudeau 2022
North Africa	Algeria	TBA	
North Africa	Egypt	1	Mark Carney 2025
North Africa	Libya	TBA	
North Africa	Sudan	1	Paul Martin 2004
Southern Africa	Madagascar	1	Justin Trudeau 2016
Southern Africa	South Africa	4	Jean Chrétien 1999, 2002 • Stephen Harper 2013 • Mark Carney 2025
West Africa	Liberia	1	Justin Trudeau 2016
West Africa	Mali	1	Justin Trudeau 2018
West Africa	Nigeria	3	Pierre Trudeau 1981 • Jean Chrétien 1999, 2002
Middle America	Bahamas	2	Justin Trudeau 2016, 2023
Middle America	Jamaica	2	Justin Trudeau 2022, 2023
Middle America	Saint Kitts and Nevis	1	Justin Trudeau 2015
Middle America	Mexico	18	John Diefenbaker 1960 • Pierre Trudeau 1974, 1976, 1981, 1982 • Brian Mulroney 1990 • Jean Chrétien 1994, 1999, 2002, 2003 • Paul Martin 2004 • Stephen Harper 2006, 2009, 2012, 2014 • Justin Trudeau 2017, 2023 • Mark Carney 2025
Middle America	Panama	1	Stephen Harper 2015
Middle America	Trinidad and Tobago	2	Stephen Harper 2009 (2)
Northern America	Bermuda	1	Justin Trudeau 2024
Northern America	Saint-Pierre and Miquelon	1	Mark Carney 2026
Northern America	United States	64	Richard Bedford Bennett 1933 • Pierre Trudeau 1976, 1983 • Brian Mulroney 1990, 1993 (2) • Jean Chrétien 1993, 1997 • Paul Martin 2004 (3), 2005 (2) • Stephen Harper 2006, 2008 (3), 2009 (2), 2010, 2011 (3), 2012 (2) • Justin Trudeau 2016 (5), 2017 (8), 2018 (4), 2019 (3), 2021, 2022 (2), 2023 (6), 2024 (4), 2025 • Mark Carney 2025 (3), 2026 (2)
South America	Argentina	5	Jean Chrétien 1995, 1998 • Paul Martin 2005 • Justin Trudeau 2016, 2018
South America	Brazil	6	Pierre Trudeau 1981 • Jean Chrétien 1995, 1998 • Paul Martin 2004 • Stephen Harper 2011 • Justin Trudeau 2024
South America	Chile	3	Jean Chrétien 1998 • Paul Martin 2004 • Stephen Harper 2012
South America	Colombia	1	Stephen Harper 2012
South America	Peru	5	Stephen Harper 2008, 2013 • Justin Trudeau 2016, 2018, 2024
East Asia	China	7	Jean Chrétien 2001 • Paul Martin 2005 • Stephen Harper 2009, 2014 • Justin Trudeau 2016, 2017 • Mark Carney 2026 (2)
East Asia	Japan	13	Pierre Trudeau 1976, 1983 • Joe Clark 1979 • Brian Mulroney 1986 • Kim Campbell 1993 • Jean Chrétien 2000 • Paul Martin 2005 • Stephen Harper 2008, 2010 • Justin Trudeau 2016, 2019, 2023 • Mark Carney 2026
East Asia	South Korea	6	Brian Mulroney 1986 • Stephen Harper 2009, 2010, 2012 • Justin Trudeau 2023 • Mark Carney 2025
South Asia	India	6	Paul Martin 2005 • Stephen Harper 2009, 2012 • Justin Trudeau 2018, 2023 • Mark Carney 2026
South Asia	Pakistan	TBA	
South Asia	Sri Lanka	1	Paul Martin 2005
Southeast Asia	Cambodia	2	Justin Trudeau 2022 • Mark Carney 2026
Southeast Asia	Indonesia	3	Stephen Harper 2013 • Justin Trudeau 2022, 2023
Southeast Asia	Laos	1	Justin Trudeau 2024
Southeast Asia	Malaysia	1	Mark Carney 2025
Southeast Asia	Philippines	7	Pierre Trudeau 1983 • Jean Chrétien 1996, 1997 • Stephen Harper 2012 • Justin Trudeau 2015, 2017 • Mark Carney 2026
Southeast Asia	Singapore	4	Stephen Harper 2009 • Justin Trudeau 2018, 2023 • Mark Carney 2025
Southeast Asia	Thailand	2	Paul Martin 2005 • Justin Trudeau 2022
Southeast Asia	Vietnam	2	Stephen Harper 2006 • Justin Trudeau 2017
West Asia	Armenia	2	Justin Trudeau 2018 • Mark Carney 2026
West Asia	Bahrain	TBA	
West Asia	Cyprus	TBA	
West Asia	Iraq	TBA	
West Asia	Israel	1	Justin Trudeau 2016
West Asia	Jordan	TBA	
West Asia	Kuwait	TBA	
West Asia	Oman	TBA	
West Asia	Qatar	1	Mark Carney 2026
West Asia	Saudi Arabia	1	Mark Carney 2026
West Asia	Turkey	3	Justin Trudeau 2015 • Mark Carney 2026 (2)
West Asia	United Arab Emirates	1	Mark Carney 2025
Eastern Europe & North Asia	Bulgaria	TBA	
Eastern Europe & North Asia	Czechia	1	Jean Chrétien 2002
Eastern Europe & North Asia	Hungary	TBA	
Eastern Europe & North Asia	Poland	8	Jean Chrétien 1999 • Stephen Harper 2014, 2015 • Justin Trudeau 2016, 2022, 2024, 2025 • Mark Carney 2025
Eastern Europe & North Asia	Romania	1	Stephen Harper 2008
Eastern Europe & North Asia	Russia	6	Brian Mulroney 1993 • Jean Chrétien 1995 • Paul Martin 2004 • Stephen Harper 2006, 2012, 2013
Eastern Europe & North Asia	Slovakia	TBA	
Eastern Europe & North Asia	Soviet Union (Note: The Soviet Union was split into 15 independent countries in 1991.)	2	Brian Mulroney 1985, 1989
Eastern Europe & North Asia	Ukraine	6	Justin Trudeau 2016, 2022, 2023, 2024, 2025 • Mark Carney 2025
Northern Europe	Denmark	TBA	
Northern Europe	Estonia	TBA	
Northern Europe	Finland	TBA	
Northern Europe	Iceland	1	Pierre Trudeau 1981 • Justin Trudeau 2023
Northern Europe	Latvia	5	Stephen Harper 2006 • Justin Trudeau 2018, 2022, 2023 • Mark Carney 2025
Northern Europe	Lithuania	1	Justin Trudeau 2023
Northern Europe	Norway	1	Mark Carney 2026
Northern Europe	Sweden	TBA	
Southern Europe	Albania	TBA	
Southern Europe	Bosnia and Herzegovina	TBA	
Southern Europe	Croatia (Note: Croatia became independent in 1991.)	TBA	
Southern Europe	Greece	TBA	
Southern Europe	Italy	11	Pierre Trudeau 1980 • Brian Mulroney 1987 • Jean Chrétien 1994, 2001 • Stephen Harper 2009 • Justin Trudeau 2017, 2021, 2024 • Mark Carney 2025, 2026 (2)
Southern Europe	Macedonia (Note: Name was changed from Macedonia to North Macedonia on February 12, 2019.)	TBA	
Southern Europe	Malta	1	Justin Trudeau 2015
Southern Europe	Portugal	2	Stephen Harper 2010 • Justin Trudeau 2025
Southern Europe	Slovenia	TBA	
Southern Europe	Spain	3	Pierre Trudeau 1982 • Jean Chrétien 1997 • Justin Trudeau 2022
Southern Europe	Vatican City	2	Justin Trudeau 2017 • Mark Carney 2025
Western Europe	Austria	TBA	
Western Europe	Belgium	8	Stephen Harper 2014 • Justin Trudeau 2016, 2017, 2018, 2021, 2022, 2025 • Mark Carney 2025
Western Europe	France	25	Pierre Trudeau 1982 • Brian Mulroney 1989 • Jean Chrétien 1996, 2003 • Stephen Harper 2009 (2), 2011 (2), 2014 • Justin Trudeau 2015, 2017 (2), 2018 (2), 2019 (3), 2024 (2), 2025 • Mark Carney 2025, 2026 (4)
Western Europe	Germany (Note: All subsequent visits by Canadian Prime Ministers have been made to the Federal Republic of Germany, which was known colloquially as "West Germany" from 1949 to 1990 during the post World War II West–East division of Germany. No incumbent Canadian Prime Minister ever visited the German Democratic Republic ("East Germany") during its existence in the same time frame.)	13	Pierre Trudeau 1978 • Brian Mulroney 1985, 1992 • Jean Chrétien 1999 • Stephen Harper 2007, 2009, 2015 • Justin Trudeau 2017 (2), 2020, 2022 (2) • Mark Carney 2025
Western Europe	Ireland	9	John Diefenbaker 1961 • Pierre Trudeau 1975 • Brian Mulroney 1991 • Jean Chrétien 1999 • Paul Martin 2005 • Stephen Harper 2013 • Justin Trudeau 2017 • Mark Carney 2026 (2)
Western Europe	Luxembourg	TBA	
Western Europe	Netherlands	3	Stephen Harper 2014 • Justin Trudeau 2021 • Mark Carney 2025
Western Europe	Switzerland	4	Justin Trudeau 2016, 2018, 2024 • Mark Carney 2026
Western Europe	United Kingdom	25	Pierre Trudeau 1977, 1984 • Brian Mulroney 1991, 1993 • Jean Chrétien 1998 • Paul Martin 2005 • Stephen Harper 2009, 2010, 2013, 2014 • Justin Trudeau 2015, 2017, 2018, 2019 (2), 2021 (2), 2022 (2), 2023, 2025 • Mark Carney 2025 (2), 2026 (2)
Oceania	Australia	8	John Diefenbaker 1958 • Pierre Trudeau 1970 • Jean Chrétien 1995, 2002 • Stephen Harper 2007, 2011, 2014 • Mark Carney 2026
Oceania	New Zealand	4	John Diefenbaker 1958 • Pierre Trudeau 1970 • Jean Chrétien 1995 • Stephen Harper 2014
Oceania	Papua New Guinea	1	Justin Trudeau 2018

== First visit by Country ==
Countries by first incumbent Canadian prime ministerial visit
Country	Date	Prime Minister	Ref.
United States	April 24–28, 1933	R. B. Bennett	
Poland	January 25, 1999	Jean Chrétien	
Rwanda	June 22–25, 2022	Justin Trudeau	
Laos	October 8–11, 2024	Justin Trudeau	

== See also ==
- List of international trips made by prime ministers of Bangladesh
- List of international trips made by prime ministers of India
- List of international trips made by prime ministers of Japan
- List of international trips made by prime ministers of the United Kingdom
- List of international trips made by presidents of France
- List of international trips made by presidents of Iran
- List of international trips made by presidents of Pakistan
- List of international trips made by presidents of South Korea
- List of international trips made by presidents of the United States
