= List of international presidential trips made by François Hollande =

Map of international trips made by François Hollande as president: 1 visit 2 visits 3 visits 4 visits 5 visits 6 visits 7 or more visits France and Andorra

François Hollande, the 24th President of France, made 183 presidential trips to 83 states internationally during his presidency, which began with his inauguration on 15 May 2012 and ended with the inauguration of Emmanuel Macron on 14 May 2017.

== Summary ==
The number of visits per country where President Hollande traveled are:

- One visit to Afghanistan, Angola, Argentina, Belarus, Benin, Cameroon, Canada, Chad, Chile, Colombia, Comoros, Cuba, Cyprus, Czech Republic, Democratic Republic of the Congo, Ethiopia, Georgia, Guinea, Haiti, Iceland, Indonesia, Ireland, Ivory Coast (Côte d'Ivoire), Kazakhstan, Laos, Latvia, Lithuania, Luxembourg, Madagascar, Malaysia, Monaco, Niger, Norway, Palestine, Peru, Philippines, Romania, Singapore, Slovenia, South Korea, Turkey, Ukraine, Uruguay and Vietnam.
- Two visits to Algeria, Armenia, Australia, Azerbaijan, Egypt, India, Iraq, Israel, Japan, Jordan, Lebanon, Mexico, Netherlands, Nigeria, Portugal, Qatar, Senegal, South Africa, United Arab Emirates and Vatican City.
- Three visits to Brazil, the Central African Republic, China, Greece, Mali, Morocco, Slovakia and Tunisia.
- Four visits to Malta and Switzerland.
- Five visits to Russia, Spain and Saudi Arabia.
- Six visits to Poland.
- Seven visits to the United Kingdom.
- Eight visits to Italy.
- Ten visits to the United States.
- Twenty-two visits to Germany.
- Forty-two visits to Belgium.

== 2012 ==
In his first year in office, President François Hollande made 25 international trips to 18 countries. The following were the international trips made by the president in 2012:

Country	Areas visited	Date(s)	Details	Image
Germany	Berlin	15 May	President Hollande's state visit to Germany was his first trip outside France as president. He chose Germany as the first foreign trip of his presidency in a demonstration of the historic and strategic ties between the two countries.	
United States	Washington, D.C., Camp David, Chicago	18–21 May	During President Hollande's first trip outside the European continent, he met with the U.S. President Barack Obama in Washington. The two leaders said the Euro area crisis was of great importance to the whole world. President Hollande said, "We have the same conviction that Greece must remain in the eurozone". They agreed on most views, except the withdrawal of France's troops from Afghanistan at year's end. President Hollande later attended the 38th G8 summit in Camp David and the 2012 NATO summit in Chicago.	
Belgium	Brussels	23 May	President Hollande travelled to Brussels in order to attend a European Union leaders summit, regarding the Euro area crisis.	
Afghanistan	Kabul, Kapisa Province	25 May	For security reasons, this visit was unannounced. Hollande met with Afghan President Hamid Karzai in Kabul and visited French soldiers at the Nijrab base in the province of Kapisa where most French troops are based.	
Italy	Rome	14 June	In Rome, President Hollande met with Prime Minister Mario Monti to discuss the Euro area crisis.	
Mexico	Los Cabos	18–19 June	President Hollande travelled to Mexico in order to attend the 2012 G-20 Los Cabos summit in Los Cabos.	
Brazil	Rio de Janeiro	20 June	After visiting Mexico for the 2012 G-20 Mexico summit, President Hollande flew to Rio de Janeiro, Brazil in order to attend the United Nations Conference on Sustainable Development.	
Italy	Rome	22 June	A European debt crisis quadripartite summit was held in Rome with Italian President Mario Monti, Spanish Prime Minister Mariano Rajoy, and German Chancellor Angela Merkel.	
Belgium	Brussels	28–29 June	President Hollande travelled to Brussels in order to attend a European Council, focused on European growth policy.	
United Kingdom	London	10 July	In his first official visit to the United Kingdom as president, President Hollande met with British Prime Minister David Cameron, where the two argued on the president's plans to increase income taxes in France. The president then met with Queen Elizabeth II at Windsor Castle.	
United Kingdom	London	30 July	For the second time within a month, President Hollande travelled to London in order to attend events held at the 2012 Summer Olympics, as well as to visit the French Olympic team.	
Germany	Berlin	23 August	President Hollande met with German Chancellor Angela Merkel in Berlin to discuss the Greek government-debt crisis, in preparation for Greek Prime Minister Antonis Samaras' visit to their respective capitals.	
Spain	Madrid	30 August	President Hollande met with Spanish Prime Minister Mariano Rajoy during his one-day official visit to Madrid, in order to discuss Spain's increasing issues on the 2008–14 Spanish financial crisis.	
United Kingdom	London	6 September	In London, President Hollande attended events held at the 2012 Summer Paralympics. The president also participated in a press conference held at the Queen Elizabeth Olympic Park, along with British Prime Minister David Cameron, regarding the Annecy shootings, as well as the Euro area crisis and the Syrian Civil War.	
Germany	Ludwigsburg	22 September	President Hollande met with Chancellor Angela Merkel in Ludwigsburg to open the German-French year, 50 years after the Elysée Treaty.	
United States	New York City	24–26 September	President Hollande attended the sixty-seventh session of the United Nations General Assembly and met with several world leaders.	
Malta	Valletta	5 October	President Hollande travelled to Valletta to attend the 5+5 Dialogue, which discussed the Euro area crisis. President Hollande was joined by European Commission President José Manuel Barroso, Italian Prime Minister Mario Monti, Libyan President Mohammed Magariaf, Maltese Prime Minister Lawrence Gonzi, Portuguese Prime Minister Pedro Passos Coelho, Spanish Prime Minister Mariano Rajoy, and Tunisian President Moncef Marzouki.	
Senegal	Dakar	12 October	President Hollande travelled to Senegal on his first visit to the African continent as president "to write a new page in France's relations with Africa." In Dakar, President Hollande met with President Macky Sall. The president also addressed the National Assembly and visited the House of Slaves on Gorée.	
Democratic Republic of the Congo	Kinshasa	13 October	President Hollande travelled to Kinshasa to attend the Francophonie Summit, where he, along with Canadian Prime Minister Stephen Harper, urged leaders to strengthen democracy and human rights. President Hollande met with President Joseph Kabila and opposition leader Étienne Tshisekedi of the Union for Democracy and Social Progress to discuss internal issues.	
Belgium	Brussels	18–19 October	President Hollande travelled to Brussels in order to attend a European Council, focused on economic policy.	
Lebanon	Beirut	4 November	President Hollande paid a three-hour visit to Beirut to meet with President Michel Suleiman at the Baabda Palace. The president shared France and the European Union's support against the instability in Lebanon, in light of the assassination of intelligence official Wissam al-Hassan, which caused tensions between pro- and anti-Syrian groups.	
Saudi Arabia	Jeddah	4 November	After a brief visit to Beirut, President Hollande headed to Jeddah in order to meet with King Abdullah and to improve bilateral relations between France and Saudi Arabia. The two heads of state discussed the Iranian nuclear program, the Israeli–Palestinian peace process, the Syrian Civil War, and the cooperation between the two countries.	
Laos	Vientiane	5 November	President Hollande attended the 9th Asia–Europe Meeting in Vientiane. Prior to the summit, President Hollande met with President Choummaly Sayasone at the Presidential Palace. President Hollande also held talks with Chinese Premier Wen Jiabao.	
Poland	Warsaw	16 November	On 16 November, President Hollande travelled to Warsaw for an official visit, where he met with President Bronisław Komorowski at the Presidential Palace to discuss the budget of the European Union for 2014–2020, economic relations between France and Poland, and the collaboration between the "Weimar Triangle" countries (France, Germany, and Poland). President Hollande later laid a wreath at the Tomb of the Unknown Soldier, participated in the Polish-French Economic Forum at the Copernicus Science Centre, and addressed the Sejm. Back at the Presidential Palace, President Hollande was hosted by President Komorowski and First Lady Anna Komorowska for an official dinner. President Hollande also met with Prime Minister Donald Tusk.	
Belgium	Brussels	22–23 November	President Hollande travelled to Brussels in order to attend an "extraordinary" European Council, focused on EU budget and the Euro area crisis.	
Norway	Oslo	10 December	President Hollande attended the 2012 Nobel Peace Prize award ceremony at the Oslo City Hall.	
Belgium	Brussels	13–14 December	President Hollande attended the European Council, focused on Economic and Monetary Union regulations and growth mechanisms.	
Algeria	Algiers, Tlemcen	19–20 December	President Hollande travelled to Algiers on a state visit to improve relations between Algeria and France in the commemoration of the semicentennial anniversary of Algeria's independence from France. Upon arrival on 19 December, the president was greeted by President Abdelaziz Bouteflika, who joined him in an open motorcade through the streets of Algiers. The two presidents agreed on opening a "new era" in the two countries' bilateral relations that would increase cooperation and trade. President Hollande met with the French community, before attending a state dinner hosted by President Bouteflika at the El Mouradia. On 20 December, President Hollande addressed the Parliament of Algeria, before delivering a speech at the University of Abou Bekr Belkaïd in Tlemcen.	

== 2013 ==
In 2013, President François Hollande made 34 international trips to 28 countries. The following were the international trips made by President Hollande during the year:

Country	Areas visited	Date(s)	Details	Image
United Arab Emirates	Abu Dhabi, Dubai	15 January	President Hollande travelled to the United Arab Emirates for a one-day visit. In Abu Dhabi, President Hollande delivered a keynote speech at the World Future Energy Summit and met with President Khalifa bin Zayed Al Nahyan to discuss the United Arab Emirates' possible purchase of the Dassault Rafale fighter jets, before heading to Dubai, where he attended a press conference and met with a French community.	
Germany	Berlin	21–22 January	President Hollande met with Chancellor Angela Merkel and German president Joachim Gauck in Berlin for the 50th anniversary of the Elysée Treaty.	
Mali	Bamako, Timbuktu	2 February	President Hollande paid a triumphant visit to the Malian cities of Bamako and Timbuktu, where he visited with French troops who participated in the Northern Mali conflict.	
Belgium	Brussels	7–8 February	President Hollande travelled to Brussels in order to attend a European Council, focused on EU trade and Arab Spring consequences.	
India	New Delhi, Mumbai	14–15 February	President Hollande and his partner Valérie Trierweiler travelled to India on a two-day state visit. On 14 February, in New Delhi, President Hollande visited the Rashtrapati Bhavan and the Raj Ghat, before meeting with Prime Minister Manmohan Singh and External Affairs Minister Salman Khurshid. The following day, he delivered a lecture at the Nehru Memorial Museum & Library in the Teen Murti Bhavan, the former residence of Jawaharlal Nehru, the first Indian prime minister. President Hollande also awarded economist and philosopher Amartya Sen with the Legion of Honour. Afterwards, President Hollande travelled to Mumbai where he met with Governor Kateekal Sankaranarayanan and attended a business conference.	
Greece	Athens	19 February	President Hollande paid an official visit to Athens to promote the investment of French companies to Greece's economy, affected by the Greek government-debt crisis. President Hollande met with Prime Minister Antonis Samaras, President Karolos Papoulias, and Deputy Prime Minister Evangelos Venizelos. He also addressed a meeting with heads of Greek companies.	
Russia	Moscow	27–28 February	President Hollande travelled to Moscow for a two-day visit, where he met with President Vladimir Putin. A bilateral meeting between the two presidents was held to address global issues with Russia involved.	
Poland	Warsaw	6 March	President Hollande travelled to Warsaw to participate to the summit of the Visegrád Group. It was an opportunity to further discuss the outcome of the previous European Council and the security and defense matters.	
Belgium	Brussels	14–15 March	President Hollande travelled to Brussels in order to attend a European Council, focused on EU competitiveness and youth employment.	
Germany	Berlin	18 March	President Hollande met with Chancellor Angela Merkel, President of the European Commission Jose Manuel Barroso and economic leaders in Berlin to discuss how Europe can strengthen its competitiveness and create jobs.	
Morocco	Casablanca, Rabat	3–4 April	President Hollande paid an official visit to Morocco, visiting Casablanca and Rabat. He met with King Mohammed VI and Prime Minister Abdelilah Benkirane. President Hollande also addressed the Parliament of Morocco in Rabat and delivered the closing remarks of an economic forum attended by French and Moroccan business leaders.	
China	Beijing, Shanghai	25–26 April	President Hollande travelled to Beijing and Shanghai on a state visit to China with a goal to improve exports, where he met with President Xi Jinping and addressed a business forum in Beijing. In Shanghai, President Hollande delivered a speech at the Shanghai Jiao Tong University.	
Belgium	Brussels	15 May	President Hollande travelled to Brussels, invited by European Commission President José Manuel Barroso. He participated to the donors' conference for Mali.	
Belgium	Brussels	22 May	President Hollande travelled to Brussels in order to attend a European Council, focused on energy and taxation.	
Germany	Leipzig	23 May	President Hollande met German president Joachim Gauck and Chancellor Angela Merkel in Leipzig for the 150th anniversary of the SPD.	
Ethiopia	Addis Ababa	25 May	President Hollande participated in the summit for the 50th anniversary of the African Union held in Addis Ababa.	
Japan	Tokyo	6–8 June	President Hollande travelled to Tokyo on a state visit to Japan, where he met with Emperor Akihito, Empress Michiko, and Prime Minister Shinzō Abe.	
United Kingdom	Lough Erne	17–18 June	President Hollande participated in the 39th G8 summit, where Syria and tax evasion were discussed.	
Qatar	Doha	22–23 June	President Hollande visited Doha to improve the economic ties between France and Qatar. He also met with Emir Hamad bin Khalifa Al Thani in order to discuss the Syrian Civil War.	
Jordan	Amman	23 June	President Hollande met with King Abdullah II in Amman to discuss regional issues, including the Israeli–Palestinian peace process and the Syrian Civil War, as well as bilateral relations and developments in the Middle East.	
Belgium	Brussels	27–28 June	President Hollande travelled to Brussels in order to attend a European Council, focused on youth employment and growth in the European Union.	
Germany	Berlin	3 July	President Hollande met with Chancellor Angela Merkel for a conference on youth employment in Europe.	
Tunisia	Tunis	4–5 July	President Hollande paid a visit to Tunisia, where he was welcomed by President Moncef Marzouki. He announced a €500 million package to help the Tunisian economy.	
Slovenia	Ljubljana	25 July	President Hollande travelled to Ljubljana to attend the Brdo Process conference, before meeting with President Borut Pahor to discuss ways of increasing bilateral cooperation. President Hollande also visited the University of Ljubljana to debate youth unemployment with a group of students.	
Russia	Saint Petersburg	5–6 September	President Hollande travelled to Saint Petersburg to attend the 2013 G-20 Saint Petersburg summit. He also met with President Barack Obama of the United States.	
Mali	Bamako	19 September	President Hollande is invited to the investiture ceremony of President Ibrahim Boubacar Keïta.	
United States	New York City	24 September	President Hollande attended the sixty-eighth session of the United Nations General Assembly, where he met with several world leaders, including newly elected Iranian President Hassan Rouhani.	
South Africa	Pretoria, Johannesburg	14–15 October	President Hollande travelled to Pretoria on a state visit to South Africa, where he met with President Jacob Zuma at the Union Buildings. The two presidents held a bilateral meeting, discussing political and economic ties, followed by a joint press conference. President Hollande later attended a wreath-laying ceremony at Freedom Park. President Zuma also hosted a state banquet for President Hollande at the Mahlamba Ndlopfu. On his second day, President Hollande met with Deputy President Kgalema Motlanthe. He also visited a Sanofi production plant in Mamelodi, visited HIV/AIDS organizations, and visited the Hector Pieterson Museum and the Mandela House in Soweto, upon travelling to Johannesburg. President Hollande also visited the Nelson Mandela Foundation, where he met with Graça Machel, the wife of former president Nelson Mandela. Before flying home, President Hollande met with a French community.	
Belgium	Brussels	24–25 October	President Hollande travelled to Brussels in order to attend a European Council, focused on the digital economy and union banking.	
Slovakia	Bratislava	29 October	President Hollande travelled to Bratislava to highlight the 20 years of Slovakia's independence, becoming the first French president to visit to Slovakia as an independent sovereign state. In Bratislava, President Hollande met with President Ivan Gašparovič, Prime Minister Robert Fico, and Speaker Pavol Paška of the National Council, whom he met at the Bratislava Castle.	
Monaco	Monaco	14 November	President Hollande paid an official visit to Monaco, where he met with Albert II, Prince of Monaco. The two held a bilateral meeting at the Prince's Palace of Monaco and signed five partnership agreements for scientific and environmental research at the Oceanographic Museum. The two also visited the workshops of Venturi Automobiles and offices of the Scientific Centre of Monaco.	
Israel; State of Palestine	Tel Aviv, Jerusalem, Ramallah	17–19 November	On 17 November, President Hollande travelled to Tel Aviv for a state visit to Israel, where he was welcomed by President Shimon Peres and Prime Minister Benjamin Netanyahu at Ben Gurion Airport. President Hollande and President Peres discussed the nuclear program of Iran and the Israeli–Palestinian peace talks at Beit HaNassi. President Hollande then met with Prime Minister Netanyahu, holding a joint press conference and signing bilateral cooperation agreements. President Hollande also visited Yad Vashem. On 18 November, President Hollande visited St Anne's Church, before visiting the Palestinian city of Ramallah in the West Bank. In Ramallah, he laid a wreath at the burial site of former Palestinian leader Yasser Arafat, then met with President Mahmoud Abbas, before returning to Jerusalem. In Jerusalem, President Hollande addressed the Knesset at a special session, then attended a state dinner hosted by President Peres. On 19 November, President Hollande visited the graves of the victims of the Toulouse and Montauban shootings in March 2012. He then toured an Israeli innovation exhibit, before returning to France.	
Spain	Madrid	27 November	President Hollande met with Prime Minister Mariano Rajoy during a bilateral Franco-Spanish summit to discuss euro bank rule.	
Lithuania	Vilnius	28–29 November	President Hollande travelled to Vilnius where he participated in the Eastern Partnership Summit.	
Poland	Warsaw	29 November	President Hollande travelled to Warsaw where he met the President Bronislaw Komorowski and Prime Minister Donald Tusk, where the Euromaidan was discussed.	
South Africa	Johannesburg	10 December	President Hollande, along with former president Nicolas Sarkozy, former prime ministers Alain Juppe and Lionel Jospin, and 2 Ministers, flew to Johannesburg to attend the state memorial service for Nelson Mandela, the first President of South Africa, at the FNB Stadium.	
Central African Republic	Bangui	10 December	President Hollande made a quick trip to Bangui, where he met with President Michel Djotodia and French peacekeepers and soldiers, before flying home to France.	
Brazil	Brasília, São Paulo	12–13 December	President Hollande travelled on a state visit to Brazil in order to increase trade and strengthen the strategic partnership between Brazil and France. In Brasília, President Hollande met with President Dilma Rousseff at the Palácio do Planalto. He also participated in the Brazil–France High Level Dialogue on Education at the National Museum of the Republic, before heading to São Paulo. In São Paulo, President Hollande and President Rousseff met with business leaders at the Federação das Indústrias do Estado de São Paulo.	
Belgium	Brussels	19–20 December	President Hollande travelled to Brussels in order to attend a European Council, focused on Ukraine and defence, economic, and social policies, as well as migration flows.	
Saudi Arabia	Riyadh	29–30 December	President Hollande paid a two-day state visit to the Kingdom of Saudi Arabia focused on the Middle Eastern crisis and commercial cooperation.	

== 2014 ==
In 2014, President François Hollande made 30 international trips to 27 countries. The following were the international trips made by President Hollande during the year:

Country	Areas visited	Date(s)	Details	Image
Netherlands	The Hague, Amsterdam	20 January	President Hollande travelled to The Hague on a state visit to meet with King Willem-Alexander, Queen Máxima, and Prime Minister Mark Rutte. He also met with the House of Representatives and the Senate, where he addressed the diplomatic and political ties between the two countries.	
Vatican City	Vatican City	24 January	President Hollande met with Pope Francis during his visit to Vatican City. The two held private talks inside the Apostolic Palace, where they discussed the Central African Republic conflict, Christianity in the Middle East, the Israeli–Palestinian conflict, and the Syrian Civil War.	
Turkey	Ankara, Istanbul	27–28 January	President Hollande travelled to Ankara on a state visit to meet with President Abdullah Gül. A bilateral meeting was held for the two presidents, in which political and economic issues were discussed, as well as cooperation and partnership between the two countries. He also attended a ceremony at the Anıtkabir. President Hollande then travelled to Istanbul, where he attended an economic forum with French and Turkish business leaders.	
United Kingdom	London	31 January	President Hollande travelled to London to attend the UK-France Summit 2014. He also met with Prime Minister David Cameron.	
Tunisia	Tunis	7 February	President Hollande assisted to the presidential ceremony of the Tunisian Constitution of 2014.	
United States	Washington, D.C., Charlottesville, San Francisco	10–12 February	President Hollande travelled to Washington, D.C. to meet with President Barack Obama. The two presidents travelled to the Monticello in Charlottesville on board the U.S. president's Air Force One, the residence of the third President and Founding Father Thomas Jefferson, who also served as a United States Minister to France. At the White House, President Hollande and President Obama discussed the Economy of France, the Eurozone, and the comprehensive agreement on Iranian nuclear program. President Hollande also travelled to San Francisco to meet with chiefs in Silicon Valley.	
Nigeria	Abuja	27 February	During a one-day official visit to Nigeria, President Hollande attended the International Conference on Peace and Security and met with President Goodluck Jonathan.	
Central African Republic	Bangui	28 February	President Hollande travelled to the Central African Republic for the second time within three months. In Bangui, he delivered a speech to French military personnel and met with acting President Catherine Samba-Panza.	
Belgium	Brussels	6 March	President Hollande travelled to Brussels in order to attend an "extraordinary summit" of the European Council on Ukraine.	
Belgium	Brussels	20–21 March	President Hollande travelled to Brussels in order to attend to the European Council which focused on Ukraine, energy, and growth.	
Netherlands	The Hague	24 March	President Hollande travelled to The Hague for the 2014 Nuclear Security Summit.	
Mexico	Mexico City, Querétaro	10–11 April	President Hollande met with President Enrique Peña Nieto in Mexico City during his two-day state visit to Mexico. The two presidents signed bilateral agreements regarding several industries, including aerospace, energy, health, and technology. He also met with a French community in Mexico City and toured the site of Airbus Helicopters in Querétaro.	
Germany	Berlin, Sassnitz	9–10 May	President Hollande visited Berlin to meet with Chancellor Angela Merkel. The two discussed the European Union's decision on imposing sanctions on Russia due to its involvement in the 2014 pro-Russian unrest in Ukraine. President Hollande and Chancellor Merkel also toured the Baltic Sea on the MS Nordwind off the coast of Sassnitz.	
Azerbaijan	Baku	11 May	President Hollande visited Baku for commercial discussions and exchanges of views around the Russo-Ukrainian war.	
Armenia	Yerevan	12–13 May	President Hollande travelled to Yerevan to pay a two-day state visit, where he met with President Serzh Sargsyan. He then attended the Armenian-French Business Forum, visited the construction site of a Carrefour store, inaugurated the Missak Manouchian Park in Yerevan, and met with a French community at the Embassy of France in Yerevan, and attended a concert by French-Armenian singer Charles Aznavour at the Karen Demirchyan Complex. President Sargsyan also hosted a state dinner for President Hollande at the Presidential Palace. The following day, President Hollande visited Tsitsernakaberd in order to honor the victims of the Armenian genocide.	
Georgia	Tbilisi	13 May	President Hollande visited Tbilisi and showed support in the shadow of the Russo-Ukrainian war.	
Belgium	Brussels	27 May	President Hollande attended the meeting of the European Council to prepare the designation of the new European Commission President.	
Poland	Warsaw	4 June	President Hollande travelled to Warsaw to participate in the 25th anniversary of the Polish freedom.	
Belgium	Brussels	4–5 June	President Hollande attended the 40th G7 summit, which was relocated to Brussels instead of Sochi, Russia and without President Vladimir Putin.	
Belgium	Ypres, Brussels	26–27 June	President Hollande travelled to Ypres and Brussels in order to attend to the European Council which focused once again on Ukraine, energy, and growth. Jean-Claude Juncker was designated as new President of the European Commission.	
Belgium	Brussels	16 July	President Hollande travelled to Brussels in order to attend to the extraordinary European Council on strategic agenda for 2014 with Jean-Claude Juncker, the new President of the European Commission, and on situations in Ukraine and the 2014 Israel–Gaza conflict.	
Ivory Coast	Abidjan	17 July	President Hollande travelled to Abidjan to meet with President Alassane Ouattara. He also met with members of the Ivorian Popular Front.	
Niger	Niamey	18 July	President Hollande travelled to Niamey, where he met with President Mahamadou Issoufou. He also visited a French military base in Niamey.	
Chad	N'Djamena	19 July	President Hollande travelled to N'Djamena to launch the new headquarters of Operation Barkhane, an anti-Islamist operation within the Sahel region, where he met with French troops. He also met with President Idriss Déby.	
Belgium	Liège	4 August	President Hollande travelled to Liège for the commemoration of the 100th anniversary of World War I.	
Comoros	Moroni	23 August	President Hollande travelled to Moroni for the 4th Indian Ocean Commission Summit.	
Belgium	Brussels	30 August	President Hollande travelled to Brussels in order to attend to the "extraordinary" European Council, which appointed Donald Tusk as European Council President and Federica Mogherini as High Representative of the European Union for Foreign Affairs and Security Policy. Foreign affairs were particularly raised during this meeting.	
United Kingdom	Newport	4–5 September	President Hollande travelled to Newport to attend the NATO 2014 Wales summit.	
Iraq	Baghdad	12 September	President Hollande visited Baghdad to meet with President Fuad Masum. The two presidents discussed France's military actions, particularly on launching airstrikes, against the Islamic State of Iraq and the Levant.	
United States	New York City	23–24 September	President Hollande attended the sixty-ninth session of the United Nations General Assembly.	
Italy	Milan	8 October	President Hollande attended a restricted European Summit for employment.	
Italy	Milan	16–17 October	President Hollande attended the 10th Asia–Europe Meeting in Milan, where he also met with Prime Minister Matteo Renzi and other European Union leaders at the European Youth Employment conference. At the Asia–Europe Meeting, President Hollande held talks with Chinese Premier Li Keqiang.	
Belgium	Brussels	23–24 October	President Hollande travelled to Brussels in order to attend the European Council which focused on climate, the Ebola virus epidemic in West Africa, and Ukraine.	
Canada	Calgary, Banff, Montreal, Quebec City, Ottawa	2–4 November	President Hollande travelled to Canada for a state visit. On Sunday, 2 November, he arrived in Calgary, where he met with Prime Minister Stephen Harper, both of whom then travelled to the Banff National Park in Banff. In Banff, a state dinner was held by Governor General David Johnston. President Hollande and Prime Minister Harper also discussed international security, trade and economic development, innovation, and the ties between their peoples. On Monday, 3 November, President Hollande addressed the Parliament of Canada in Ottawa, where he addressed environmental issues regarding climate change. On Tuesday, 4 November, President Hollande visited Quebec City, where he addressed the National Assembly of Quebec, before travelling to Montreal.	
Australia	Brisbane	15–16 November	On 15 and 16 November, President Hollande travelled to Brisbane to attend the 2014 G-20 Brisbane summit, becoming the first French president to visit Australia.	
Australia	Canberra, Sydney	18–19 November	On 18 and 19 November, President Hollande travelled to Canberra and Sydney, returning to Australia for a state visit after a visit to the French overseas collectivity of New Caledonia. In Sydney, President Hollande, along with President Édouard Fritch of the French Polynesia and President Harold Martin of New Caledonia, were welcomed by Governor-General Peter Cosgrove at the Admiralty House. He later visited the Thales Group in Rydalmere and delivered speeches to New South Wales Premier Mike Baird and the Business Council of Australia in Westpac. In Canberra, President Hollande held bilateral talks with Prime Minister Tony Abbott, which mainly focused on the relationship between Australia and France in World War I. President Hollande and Prime Minister Abbott also discussed intelligence cooperation and security issues, which included the Russo-Ukrainian War, the territorial disputes in the South China Sea, and the Syrian Civil War. The two later visited the Australian War Memorial, where an oak tree was planted with soil coming from the Villers–Bretonneux Australian National Memorial.	
Guinea	Conakry	28–29 November	See also: Responses to the Ebola virus epidemic in West Africa President Hollande paid an official visit to Conakry to devote France's proposition against the Ebola virus epidemic in West Africa.	
Senegal	Dakar	29–30 November	On 29 and 30 November, President Hollande paid an official visit to Dakar, where he attended the Francophonie Summit.	
Kazakhstan	Astana, Almaty	5–6 December	President Hollande travelled to Astana for a two-day visit in order to discuss human rights issues with President Nursultan Nazarbayev. President Hollande also attended the inauguration of a Charles de Gaulle monument in Astana.	
Russia	Moscow	6 December	Before returning to France, President Hollande paid an unscheduled visit to Moscow, where he met with President Vladimir Putin at Moscow's Vnukovo International Airport to discuss the Russo-Ukrainian War.	
Belgium	Brussels	18 December	President Hollande travelled to Brussels in order to attend the European Council which focused on investment in Europe and the War in Donbas.	

== 2015 ==
In 2015, President François Hollande made 45 international trips to 34 countries. The following were the international trips made by President Hollande during the year:

Country	Areas visited	Date(s)	Details	Image
Switzerland	Davos	23 January	In Davos, President Hollande attended the World Economic Forum Annual Meeting, where he addressed business leaders to fight against terrorism.	
Saudi Arabia	Riyadh	24 January	President Hollande was among several world leaders who flew to Riyadh in order to pay their respects to the late King Abdullah.	
Poland	Oświęcim	27 January	President Hollande was among several world leaders attending the commemoration of the liberation of the Auschwitz concentration camp.	
Ukraine	Kyiv	5 February	President Hollande, along with German Chancellor Angela Merkel, travelled to Kyiv in order to meet with President Petro Poroshenko to discuss peace initiatives on the Russo-Ukrainian War.	
Russia	Moscow	6 February	After visiting Kyiv, President Hollande and German chancellor Merkel travelled to Moscow in order to meet with President Vladimir Putin to discuss peace initiatives on the Russo-Ukrainian War.	
Belarus	Minsk	11–12 February	President Hollande, along with German chancellor Merkel, Russian president Putin and Ukrainian president Poroshenko, travelled to Minsk in order to attend a summit regarding the peace initiatives on the Russo-Ukrainian War. Further information: Minsk II	
Belgium	Brussels	12 February	President Hollande travelled to Brussels in order to attend the informal European Council, which focused on Ukraine, terrorism, and the monetary union.	
Philippines	Manila, Guiuan	26–27 February	President Hollande arrived in Manila on Thursday, 26 February, as part of a two-day state visit, becoming the first French head of state to visit the Philippines. Upon arrival at Villamor Air Base, he was welcomed by Vice President Jejomar Binay and Foreign Secretary Albert del Rosario, before attending a wreath-laying ceremony at the Rizal Monument in Rizal Park. At the ceremony, Hollande was awarded the "Key to the City" by Manila Mayor Joseph Estrada. The president and his delegation, consisting of French actresses Marion Cotillard and Mélanie Laurent, English actor Jeremy Irons, Executive Secretary Christiana Figueres of the UN Framework Convention on Climate Change, and Ecumenical Patriarch Bartholomew I of Constantinople, attended a forum at the National Museum of the Philippines to address global efforts against climate change, before attending a similar business forum in Makati, hosted by business leaders of the Makati Business Club and the Philippines-France Business Council. Later that afternoon, President Hollande met with President Benigno Aquino III at the Malacañang Palace to discuss climate change and other global and regional issues, including terrorism, in light of the Charlie Hebdo shooting, during an expanded bilateral meeting, before launching an agreement, entitled "Manila Call to Action on Climate Change." In the evening, President Aquino hosted a state dinner for President Hollande. On Friday, 27 February, President Hollande paid a short visit to Guiuan, Eastern Samar, a municipality devastated by Typhoon Haiyan in November 2013. In Guiuan, the president and his delegation met with local fishermen who were victimized by the typhoon, toured the ruins of a local church, and delivered a speech at the Guiuan East Central School. President Hollande also announced a €1.5 million aid to help communities prone to typhoon devastation through the Agency for Technical Cooperation and Development. Upon returning to Manila, Hollande met with the French community at the French School of Manila, before leaving the country later that afternoon.	
Spain	Madrid	4 March	President Hollande met with Prime Minister Mariano Rajoy during a summit with Spain, Portugal and the European Commission on energy.	
Luxembourg	Luxembourg City	6 March	President Hollande travelled to Luxembourg on a state visit to meet with Grand Duke Henri and Prime Minister Xavier Bettel. He urged Prime Minister Bettel to battle tax avoidance, in light of the Luxembourg Leaks. In Luxembourg, President Hollande also announced France's €8 billion contribution to European Commission President Jean-Claude Juncker's economic growth plan.	
Belgium	Brussels	19–20 March	President Hollande travelled to Brussels in order to attend the European Council, which focused on the Greek government-debt crisis and energy union.	
Tunisia	Tunis	29 March	In Tunis, President Hollande participated in the march to honor the victims of the Bardo National Museum attack.	
Germany	Berlin	31 March	President Hollande met with Chancellor Angela Merkel in Berlin to discuss Germanwings Flight 9525.	
Switzerland	Bern, Zürich, Lausanne	15–16 April	President Hollande travelled to Switzerland for the second time within a year, where he met with President Simonetta Sommaruga to discuss their countries' relations with regards to disputes over Switzerland's banking privacy. The president also travelled to Zürich and Lausanne with President Sommaruga.	
Belgium	Brussels	23 April	President Hollande travelled to Brussels in order to attend an extraordinary European Council, which focused on the migrants crisis.	
Armenia	Yerevan	24 April	In Yerevan, President Hollande commemorated the centenary of the Armenian genocide at Tsitsernakaberd. The president also met with Russian President Vladimir Putin.	
Azerbaijan	Baku	25 April	President Hollande paid a quick visit to Baku, where he met with President Ilham Aliyev.	
Qatar	Doha	4 May	In Doha, President Hollande signed a contract for the sale of 24 Rafale fighter jets.	
Saudi Arabia	Riyadh	4–5 May	In Riyadh, President Hollande attended the summit of the Gulf Cooperation Council.	
Cuba	Havana	11 May	President Hollande visited Havana on 11 May, as part of a five-day visit to the Caribbean. Hollande became the first French head of state to visit the country. During this visit, Hollande met with former President Fidel Castro and his brother Raúl Castro, the current president. Hollande also delivered a speech at the University of Havana regarding France's commitment to Cuba's development after the United States embargo against Cuba.	
Haiti	Port-au-Prince	12 May	President Hollande met with President Michel Martelly during his state visit to Haiti.	
Germany	Aachen	14 May	President Hollande and German President Joachim Gauck attended the Charlemagne Prize ceremony in honor of Martin Schulz, both warning against growing populisms across Europe.	
Germany	Berlin	19 May	President Hollande and German Chancellor Angela Merkel attended the Sixth Petersberg Climate Dialogue, being held to prepare for the UN Climate Change Conference in Paris.	
Latvia	Riga	21–22 May	President Hollande travelled to Riga to participate in the 2015 Eastern Partnership Summit. Side talks with German Chancellor Angela Merkel and Prime Minister of Greece Alexis Tsipras were held on Greek debt.	
Germany	Berlin	1 June	In Berlin, President Hollande met some European industrial leaders members of the European Round Table of Industrialists. The talks were overshadowed by deepening tensions between Greece and its international creditors.	
Germany	Schloss Elmau	7–8 June	In Schloss Elmau, President Hollande attended the 41st G7 Summit. G7 called for end to fossil fuel use by 2100. U.S. President Barack Obama and Hollande also agreed on Ukraine and the nuclear program of Iran.	
Belgium	Brussels	10 June	President Hollande travelled to Brussels in order to attend the 2nd EU–CELAC Summit. After the meeting, Prime Minister of Greece Alexis Tsipras agreed with Hollande and German Chancellor Angela Merkel to intensify efforts for a bailout deal aimed at preventing Athens from defaulting.	
Switzerland	Geneva	11 June	President Hollande attended the International Labour Organization conference to raise the topic of 'green' employment and participated to a debate on climate change.	
Algeria	Algiers, Zéralda	15 June	President Hollande travelled to Algeria on a courteous visit to meet President Abdelaziz Bouteflika and some local CEOs.	
Slovakia	Bratislava	19 June	President Hollande travelled to Bratislava to participate to a summit with the Visegrád Group.	
Italy	Milan	21 June	President Hollande inaugurated the French pavilion at the Expo 2015 in Milan. Talks were held with Italian Prime Minister Matteo Renzi about migrants and Greek government-debt crisis.	
Belgium	Brussels	22 June	President Hollande travelled to Brussels in order to attend an "extraordinary" meeting of the Eurozone heads of state and government regarding the Greek government-debt crisis.	
Belgium	Brussels	25–26 June	President Hollande travelled to Brussels in order to attend the European Council. Thus he had to leave before the end due to a terrorist attack in France.	
Benin	Cotonou	2 July	President Hollande travelled to Cotonou for a state visit, where he met with President Thomas Boni Yayi to discuss economic and social issues.	
Angola	Luanda	2–3 July	President Hollande's state visit to Luanda was aimed at improving the economic cooperation between Angola and France. He also inaugurated a photo exhibit by French artist Yann Arthus-Bertrand.	
Cameroon	Yaoundé	3 July	President Hollande travelled to Yaoundé to meet with President Paul Biya, where the two presidents discussed efforts in fighting against Boko Haram. Further information: 2015 West African offensive	
Belgium	Brussels	7 July	President Hollande travelled to Brussels in order to attend an "extraordinary" meeting of the Eurozone heads of state and government regarding the Greek government-debt crisis.	
Belgium	Brussels	12–13 July	President Hollande travelled to Brussels in order to attend an "extraordinary" meeting of the Eurozone heads of state and government regarding the Greek government-debt crisis. After a 17 hours-long negotiation, an agreement has been reached between Greece and other eurozone members.	
Egypt	Ismaïlia	6 August	President Hollande travelled to Egypt in order to attend the inauguration of the second Suez Canal.	
Germany	Berlin	24 August	President Hollande met with Chancellor Angela Merkel and Ukrainian President Petro Poroshenko to discuss the implementations of the deal signed at Minsk II on 11 February to control the War in Donbas.	
Morocco	Tangier	19–20 September	President Hollande travelled to Morocco on a state visit to meet with King Mohammed VI and signed a bilateral agreement.	
United Kingdom	Wembley, Ellesborough	22–23 September	President Hollande inaugurated the Lycée International de Londres Winston Churchill in Wembley and met with Prime Minister David Cameron. He also met with the France national rugby union team competing at the 2015 Rugby World Cup.	
Belgium	Brussels	23 September	President Hollande travelled to Brussels in order to attend an extraordinary European Council about the European migrant crisis.	
United States	New York City	26–28 September	President Hollande travelled to New York City to attend the seventieth session of the United Nations General Assembly. In his address, the president discussed France's support to "politically solve" the Syrian Civil War, as well as ways to alleviate climate change.	
Belgium	Brussels	15–16 October	President Hollande travelled to Brussels in order to attend a European Council, where the president spoke on the European Union's stance over an anti-Bashar al-Assad-ruled Syria, a multilateral Syrian Civil War peace process, and the Russian military intervention in Syria.	
Iceland	Langjökull, Reykjavík, Bessastadir	16 October	President Hollande travelled to Iceland in order to attend the Arctic Circle conference, where he also witnessed the effects of climate change to the Sólheimajökull glacier, on top of the Katla volcano.	
Greece	Athens	22–23 October	President Hollande paid a state visit to Athens on 22–23 October 2015 to reaffirm France's support for Greece in resolving the Greek government-debt crisis in an effort to restore France's influence in Europe by meeting with members of the Greek government, particularly Prime Minister Alexis Tsipras. Upon arriving at Athens International Airport on Thursday, 22 October, President Hollande met with Prime Minister Tsipras and headed to the Syntagma Square to lay a wreath at the Tomb of the Unknown Soldier, before heading to the Presidential Mansion to meet with President Prokopis Pavlopoulos, who hosted a state dinner for President Hollande. On Friday, 23 October, President Hollande addressed the Hellenic Parliament, where he called for a debt relief and the implementation of a bailout agreement.	
China	Chongqing, Beijing	2–3 November	President Hollande travelled to Chongqing and Beijing on a state visit to launch an appeal for climate change with President Xi Jinping.	
South Korea	Seoul	4 November	President Hollande travelled to Seoul on a state visit to mark the 130th anniversary of diplomatic relations between France and South Korea. He met with President Park Geun-hye to discuss enhancing bilateral political, economic, cultural, and security cooperation, as well as deepening cooperation in the technology sectors. The president also participated in a symposium with Korean and French students at the Ewha Womans University to discuss green growth and its effect on combating climate change.	
Malta	Valletta	11–12 November	President Hollande travelled to Valletta in order to attend the Valletta Summit on Migration.	
United States	Washington, D.C.	24 November	President Hollande met with U.S. President Barack Obama to discuss ways to intensify their military attacks against ISIL, following the Paris attacks, as part of Hollande's effort to create a "grand coalition" against ISIL following the attacks. The two presidents also discussed the coordination on the Paris attacks investigation. Further information: Opération Chammal	
Russia	Moscow	26 November	President Hollande met with Russian President Vladimir Putin to discuss the coordination in combating ISIL and other armed groups involved in the Syrian Civil War, as part of Hollande's tour to urge a "grand coalition" against ISIL following the Paris attacks. Further information: Russian military intervention in the Syrian Civil War	
Malta	Valletta	27 November	President Hollande travelled to Valletta in order to attend the 2015 Commonwealth Heads of Government Meeting.	
Belgium	Brussels	29 November	President Hollande attended an EU-Turkey summit in Brussels focused on the European migrant crisis.	
Cyprus	Larnaca	4 December	President Hollande paid a surprise visit on the aircraft carrier Charles de Gaulle which is engaged in the fight against ISIL in the Mediterranean Sea. Then he met with President Nicos Anastasiades.	
Belgium	Brussels	17–18 December	President Hollande travelled to Brussels to attend a European Council regarding the United Kingdom European Union membership referendum.	

== 2016 ==
In 2016, President François Hollande made 37 international trips to 30 countries. The following were the international trips made by President Hollande during that year:

Country	Areas visited	Date(s)	Details	Image
India	Chandigarh, Gurgaon, New Delhi	24–26 January	On a state visit to India, President Hollande attended the Delhi Republic Day parade, held along Rajpath in New Delhi, as the parade's honorary chief guest. He met with Indian Prime Minister Narendra Modi to discuss bilateral cooperation in counter-terrorism, nuclear power and sustainable development. The two leaders later signed a deal allowing India's purchase of 36 Dassault Rafale fighter aircraft from France. President Hollande and Prime Minister Modi also visited the Rock Garden, the Capitol Complex, and the Government Museum and Art Gallery in Sector 10 in Chandigarh and inaugurated the Interim Secretariat of the International Solar Alliance, a solar energy initiative, at the National Institute of Solar Energy in Gurgaon.	
Belgium	Brussels	18–19 February	President Hollande travelled to Brussels to attend a European Council centered on the refugees crisis and on the conditions negotiated with UK before the United Kingdom European Union membership referendum.	
Peru	Lima	23–24 February	President Hollande paid a state visit to Peru to meet with Peruvian President Ollanta Humala, enhance bilateral trade, and promote investment opportunities for French businesses in the Peruvian economy. The two leaders witnessed the signing of around 20 bilateral agreements on aerospace, climate change, counter-terrorism, defense, and illegal drug trade and signed a joint declaration allowing for the establishment of a France–Peru privileged partnership.	
Argentina	Buenos Aires	24–25 February	Upon congratulating Argentine President Mauricio Macri on his victory in the 2015 elections, President Hollande announced that he will visit Argentina in February to meet with him. During their meeting at Casa Rosada in Buenos Aires, the two presidents discussed the Syrian refugee crisis, with Hollande suggesting to Macri that Argentina could assist in dealing with the crisis after commending the country's history with Lebanese and Syrian immigration. Hollande also paid tribute to the Mothers of the Plaza de Mayo, whose children disappeared during Argentina's Dirty War between the late 1970s and early 80s, by throwing flowers onto the Río de la Plata, where he was joined by the Grandmothers of the Plaza de Mayo, the organization aimed to find the missing children, and mentioned France's victimization to Argentina's military dictatorship when "22" of the victims were French. As a fan of football, he later toured the La Bombonera stadium with President Macri (a former chairman of Boca Juniors) and former footballers David Trezeguet and Omar da Fonseca.	
Uruguay	Montevideo	25 February	President Hollande paid a six-hour official visit to Uruguay, meeting with Uruguayan President Tabaré Vázquez at the Residencia de Suárez in Montevideo to discuss the establishment of a free trade agreement between the European Union and the Mercosur member states currently in negotiation, as well as international issues brought up at the United Nations Security Council as Uruguay was elected as a non-permanent member of the council for its 2016–17 period. Hollande also toured the Pasteur Institute of Montevideo.	
Belgium	Brussels	7 March	President Hollande travelled to Brussels to attend a meeting between the European Council and Turkey centered on the refugees crisis.	
Italy	Venice	8 March	President Hollande travelled to Venice for the 33rd Italy-France intergovernmental summit.	
Belgium	Brussels	17–18 March	President Hollande travelled to Brussels to attend a meeting of the European Council focused a proposal to Turkey on the refugees crisis. Turkish prime minister Ahmet Davutoglu joined the meeting on the 18 March. After the summit, Hollande left to meet with Belgium Prime Minister Charles Michel to communicate about police operation in Molenbeek linked with Paris terror attacks.	
United States	Washington, D.C.	31 March – 1 April	President Hollande attended the 2016 Nuclear Security Summit. He also held a brief bilateral meeting with U.S. President Barack Obama to discuss the high-level coordination in the military intervention against ISIL between the United States and Europe.	
Lebanon	Beirut	16–17 April	President Hollande travelled to Lebanon for a two-day working visit. He met with Prime Minister Tammam Salam and Parliament Speaker Nabih Berri. During his visit, Hollande announced that France would provide military and financial aid worth €100 million (US$113 million) to the Lebanese Armed Forces for them to assist in caring for the over one million Syrian refugees in Lebanon. Berri also asked Hollande for France's assistance in dividing the Israel–Lebanon maritime border to avoid dispute.	
Egypt	Cairo	17–18 April	President Hollande travelled to the Egyptian capital for a two-days state visit including a visit of the subway construction site.	
Jordan	Amman	19 April	President Hollande travelled to Jordan.	
United States	New York City	22 April	President Hollande witnessed the signing of the Paris Agreement at the United Nations.	
Germany	Hanover	25 April	President Hollande travelled to Hanover, Germany to participate in a multilateral meeting with British Prime Minister David Cameron, German Chancellor Angela Merkel, U.S. President Barack Obama, and Italian Prime Minister Matteo Renzi to discuss cooperation in resolving the Syrian and Libyan civil wars and the Russo-Ukrainian war.	
Central African Republic	Bangui	13 May	President Hollande travelled to the Central African Republic to meet with President Faustin-Archange Touadéra in the capital of Bangui to discuss cooperation in Operation Sangaris.	
Nigeria	Abuja	13–14 May	President Hollande attended the second Regional Security Summit hosted by Nigerian President Muhammadu Buhari in the Nigerian capital of Abuja to discuss cooperation in the ongoing military operations against terrorist groups like Boko Haram and the Islamic State of Iraq and the Levant. Hollande was also hosted by Buhari for an official visit at the Aso Villa to further discuss defence and cultural cooperation.	
Japan	Shima	26–27 May	President Hollande attended the 42nd G7 summit at the Shima Kanko Hotel in Kashiko Island, Shima, Mie Prefecture, where challenges affecting the growth of the world economy and terrorism were among the topics focused during the summit. He also met with Canadian Prime Minister Justin Trudeau.	
Switzerland	Rynächt, Pollegio	1 June	President Hollande attended the opening of the Gotthard Base Tunnel together with Swiss federal president Johann Schneider-Ammann, German chancellor Angela Merkel, Italian prime minister Matteo Renzi and Austrian chancellor Christian Kern.	
Germany	Berlin	27 June	German Chancellor Angela Merkel invited President Hollande, Italian Prime Minister Matteo Renzi, and European Council President Donald Tusk to Berlin for a summit on Monday, 27 June, to discuss the United Kingdom's decision to leave the European Union following their nationwide referendum on 23 June. The leaders agreed that they will not formally discuss future relations with the UK until the British government has invoked Article 50 of the Treaty of Lisbon.	
Belgium	Brussels	28–29 June	President Hollande travelled to Brussels to attend a European Council to discuss the United Kingdom's decision to leave the European Union.	
Poland	Warsaw	8–9 July	President Hollande travelled to Warsaw to attend the NATO 2016 Warsaw summit.	
Portugal	Lisbon	19 July	President Hollande travelled to Lisbon to call for a "new impulse" in the Europe of the 27. Due to the attack in Nice five days earlier, the visit was shortened to just a few hours, during which he met with President Marcelo Rebelo de Sousa and Prime Minister António Costa.	
Ireland	Dublin	21 July	President Hollande met with Taoiseach Enda Kenny and Irish President Michael D. Higgins to discuss the implications of the United Kingdom withdrawal from the European Union and security issues.	
Brazil	Rio de Janeiro	4–5 August	President Hollande assisted to the 2016 Summer Olympics opening ceremony.	
Vatican City	Vatican City	17 August	President Hollande met with Pope Francis after French priest Jacques Hamel's murder.	
Italy	Ventotene	22 August	President Hollande met Matteo Renzi and Angela Merkel to discuss Europe's future.	
China	Hangzhou	4–5 September	President Hollande travelled to Hangzhou to attend the 2016 G-20 Hangzhou summit.	
Vietnam	Hanoi, Ho Chi Minh City	6–7 September	President Hollande travelled to Vietnam for a state visit aiming at reinforcing economic ties between the two countries.	
Greece	Athens	9 September	President Hollande travelled to Athens to attend the first Mediterranean EU countries’ Summit.	
Romania	Bucharest, Braşov	12–13 September	President Hollande undertook a state visit to Romania.	
Slovakia	Bratislava	16 September	President Hollande attended an informal European Union summit.	
United States	New York City	19–20 September	President Hollande attended the seventy-first session of the United Nations General Assembly and met with several world leaders. He also received the World Statesman Award.	
Germany	Berlin	28 September	In Berlin, President Hollande met some European industrial leaders members of the European Round Table of Industrialists.	
Israel	Jerusalem	30 September	President Hollande attended the funeral of former Israeli President Shimon Peres.	
Germany	Berlin	19–20 October	President Hollande attended a summit on Ukraine conflict hosted by German Chancellor Angela Merkel along with Russian President Vladimir Putin and Ukrainian President Petro Poroshenko.	
Belgium	Brussels	20–21 October	President Hollande travelled to Brussels to attend a European Council.	
Morocco	Marrakesh	15–16 November	President Hollande attended the 2016 United Nations Climate Change Conference.	
Germany	Berlin	18 November	President Hollande traveled Berlin for the meeting with other European leaders of the "Quint": German Chancellor Angela Merkel, British Prime Minister Theresa May Italian Prime Minister Matteo Renzi, and Spanish Prime Minister Mariano Rajoy, as well as the President of the United States Barack Obama in the final such meeting of his presidency. The leaders discussed trade, the Russo-Ukrainian war, the Syrian Civil War, and Islamic State of Iraq and the Levant.	
Madagascar	Antananarivo	26–27 November	President Hollande travelled to Antananarivo to attend the Francophonie Summit.	
Czech Republic	Prague	30 November	President Hollande travelled to Prague for a work visit during which he met the president and prime minister as well as the French community.	
United Arab Emirates	Abu Dhabi	2–3 December	President Hollande travelled to Abu Dhabi during the National Day, before visiting the site of the Louvre Abu Dhabi and the Abu Dhabi base.	
Germany	Berlin	13 December	President Hollande travelled to Berlin to meet with Chancellor Angela Merkel.	
Belgium	Brussels	15 December	President Hollande travelled to Brussels to attend a European Council.	

== 2017 ==
In 2017, President François Hollande made thirteen international trips to thirteen countries. The following are the trips made by President Hollande in 2017:

Country	Areas visited	Date(s)	Details	Image
Iraq	Baghdad, Erbil	2 January	Further information: Opération Chammal President Hollande travelled to Iraq to reiterate France's support for the American-led intervention in Iraq supported by the Iraqi government against ISIL. He travelled to Baghdad to meet with Iraqi President Fuad Masum and Prime Minister Haider al-Abadi, and to Erbil to meet with Iraqi Kurdistan President Masoud Barzani as well as French forces stationed in the area. Hollande said that France's involvement in the intervention against ISIL "prevents acts of terrorism in France."	
Mali	Gao, Bamako	13–14 January	President Hollande travelled to Bamako for the 27th Africa–France Summit. On his way to Bamako, he stopped at the military base of Gao to visit French forces engaged in Operation Barkhane. He attended a state dinner offered by the president of Mali Ibrahim Boubacar Keïta.	
Chile	Santiago, Antofagasta	21–22 January	President Hollande paid an official visit to Chile. He met the President of Chile Michelle Bachelet and launched the Franco-Chilean year of Innovation before visiting the Bolero photovoltaic park.	
Colombia	Bogotá, Cali, Caldono	22–24 January	President Hollande paid an official visit to Colombia including an hommage to Simon Bolivar and a day around the Colombian peace process.	
Germany	Berlin	27 January	President Hollande met with German Chancellor Angela Merkel in Berlin to defend free-trade.	
Portugal	Lisbon	28 January	President Hollande travelled to Lisbon to attend the second Mediterranean EU countries’ Summit.	
Malta	Valletta	3 February	President Hollande travelled to Malta to attend an informal EU summit.	
Spain	Málaga	20 February	President Hollande travelled to Málaga for a Spain-France summit.	
Belgium	Brussels	9–10 March	President Hollande travelled to Brussels to attend a European Council.	
Italy	Rome	25 March	President Hollande travelled to Rome for the 60th anniversary of the Treaty of Rome.	
Singapore	Singapore	26-27 March		
Malaysia	Kuala Lumpur	27-29 March	President Hollande travelled for a State visit.	
Indonesia	Jakarta	29 March	President Hollande travelled for a State visit.	
Spain	Madrid	10 April	President Hollande travelled to Madrid for a Mediterranean EU countries’ Summit.	
Belgium	Brussels	29 April	President Hollande travelled to Brussels to attend an extraordinary European Council on Brexit.	
Germany	Berlin	8 May	President Hollande travelled to Berlin to meet with German Chancellor Angela Merkel for a bilateral meeting and a private dinner following the French presidential election. It was his last presidential trip.	

== Multilateral meetings ==
Group	Year					
Group	2012	2013	2014	2015	2016	2017
UN GA	24–26 September, (United States) New York City	24 September, (United States) New York City	23–24 September, (United States) New York City	27–28 September, (United States) New York City	19–20 September, (United States) New York City	
G8/G7	18–19 May, (United States) Camp David	17–18 June, (United Kingdom) Lough Erne	4–5 June, (Belgium) Brussels	7–8 June, (Germany) Schloss Elmau	26–27 May, (Japan) Shima	
G-20	18–19 June, (Mexico) Los Cabos	5–6 September, (Russia) Saint Petersburg	15–16 November, (Australia) Brisbane	15–16 November,^{[b]} (Turkey) Antalya	4–5 September, (China) Hangzhou	
NATO	20–21 May, (United States) Chicago		4–5 September, (United Kingdom) Newport		8–9 July, (Poland) Warsaw	
NSS			24–25 March, (Netherlands) The Hague		31 March – 1 April, (United States) Washington, D.C.	
OIF	13 October, (Democratic Republic of the Congo) Kinshasa		29–30 November, (Senegal) Dakar		26–27 November, (Madagascar) Antananarivo	
EP		28–29 November, (Lithuania) Vilnius		21–22 May, (Latvia) Riga		
ASEM	5–6 November, (Laos) Vientiane		16–17 October, (Italy) Milan		15–16 July,^{[c]} (Mongolia) Ulaanbaatar	
EU–CELAC		26–27 January,^{[a]} (Chile) Santiago		10 June, (Belgium) Brussels		
EU	23 May, 28–29 June, 18–19 October, 22–23 November, 13–14 December, (Belgium) Brussels	7–8 February, 14–15 March, 22 May; 27–28 June, 24–25 October, 19–20 December, (Belgium) Brussels	6 March, 20–21 March, 27 May, 26–27 June, 16 July, 30 August, 23–24 October, 18 December, (Belgium) Brussels	12 February, 19–20 March, 23 April, 25–26 June, 23 September, 15–16 October, 17–18 December, (Belgium) Brussels	18–19 February, 17–18 March, 28–29 June, 20–21 October, 15 December, (Belgium) Brussels	9–10 March, 29 April, (Belgium) Brussels
Euro summit	29 June, (Belgium) Brussels	14 March, (Belgium) Brussels	24 October, (Belgium) Brussels	22 June, 7 July, 12–13 July, (Belgium) Brussels		
██ = Did not attend; ██ = Future event.^aPrime Minister Jean-Marc Ayrault attended in the president's place. • ^bForeign Minister Laurent Fabius attended in the president's place due to the November 2015 Paris attacks. • ^cForeign Minister Jean-Marc Ayrault attended in the president's place.

== See also ==
- Foreign relations of France
- List of international trips made by presidents of France
- List of international presidential trips made by Nicolas Sarkozy, his predecessor
- List of international presidential trips made by Emmanuel Macron, his successor
