= List of prime ministers of Bangladesh =

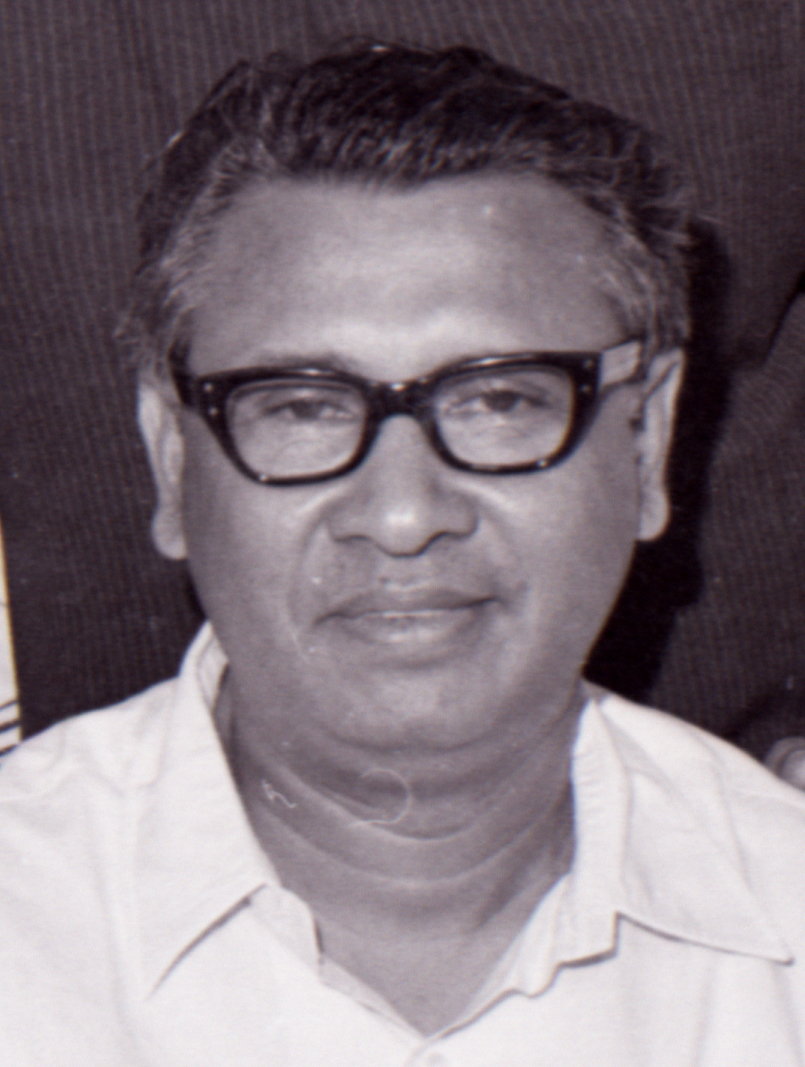
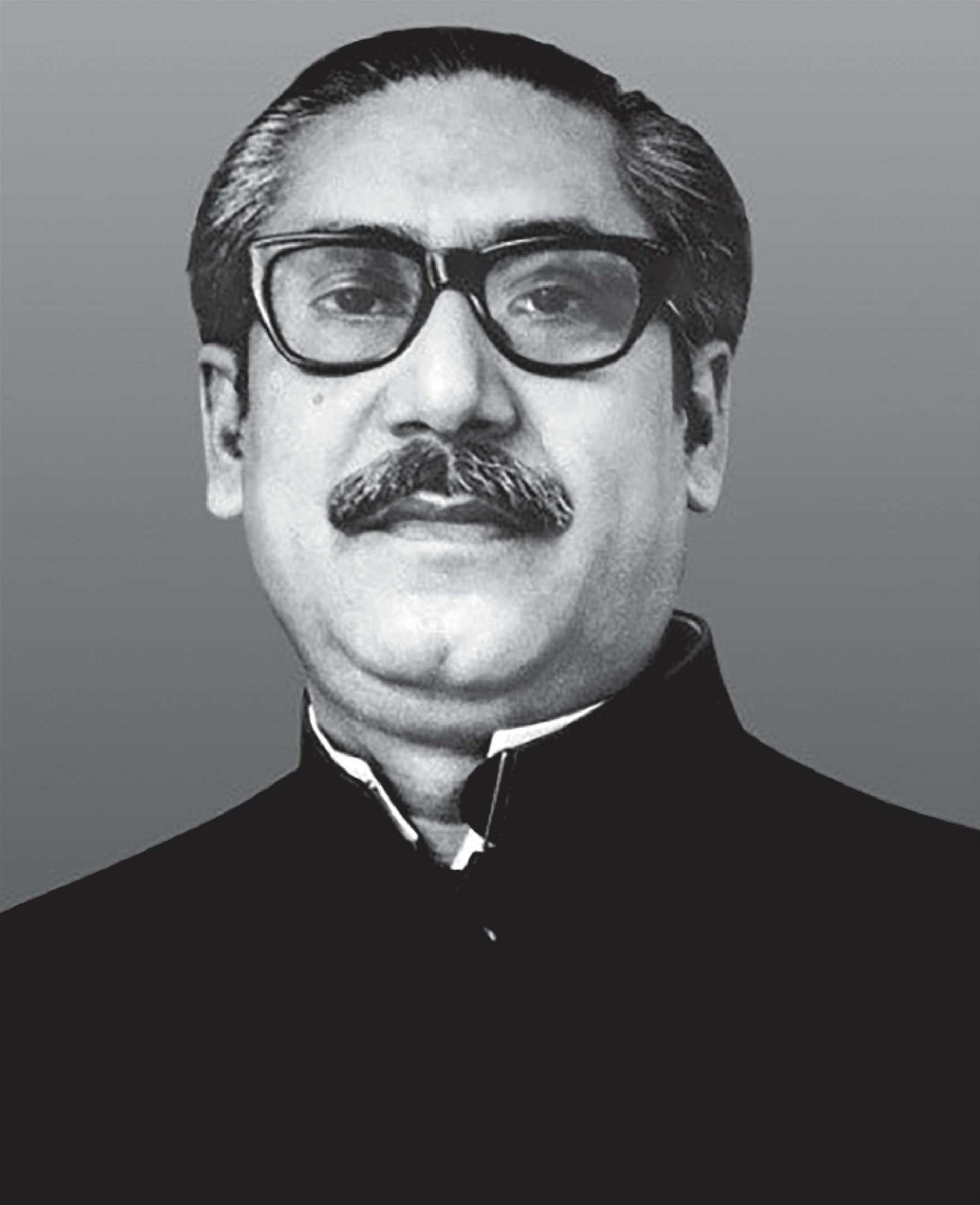
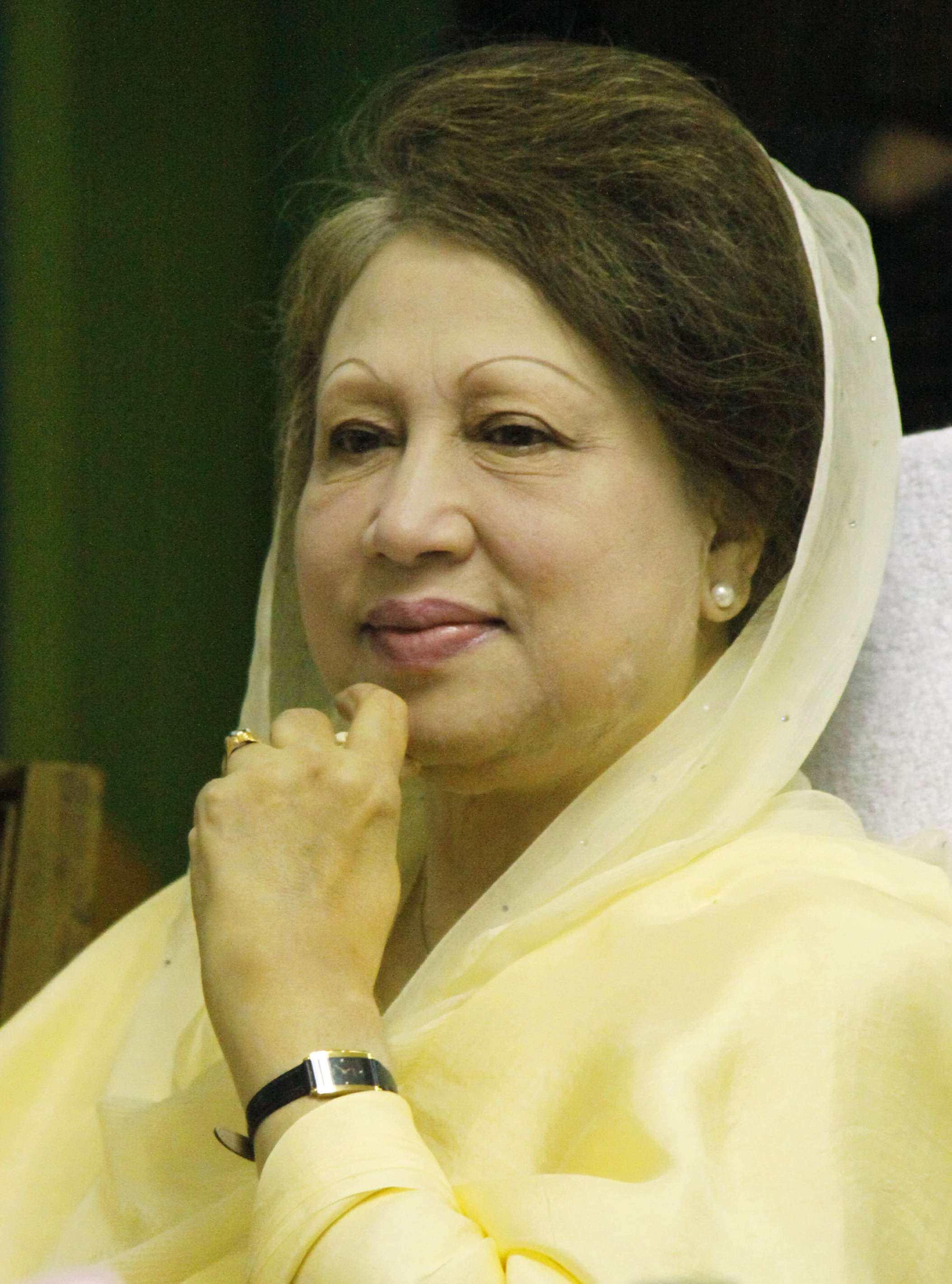
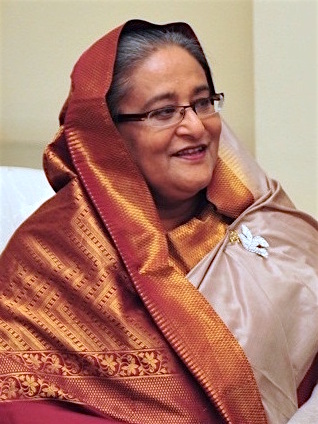
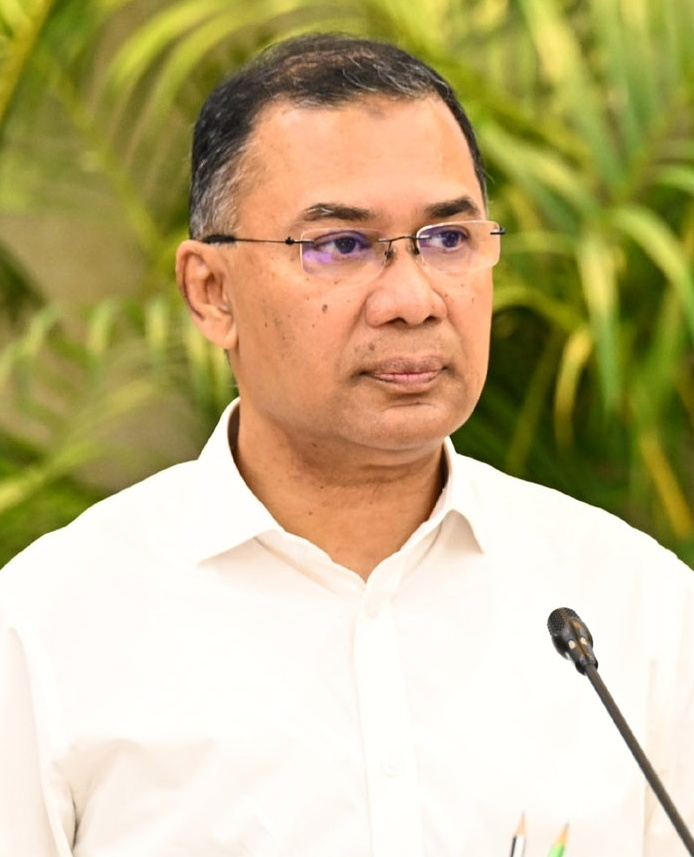
- Top left: Tajuddin Ahmad became the first prime minister of Bangladesh under the Provisional Government of Bangladesh on 10 April 1971.
- Top middle: Sheikh Mujibur Rahman became prime minister of Bangladesh on 7 March 1973.
- Top right: Khaleda Zia, the first female prime minister of Bangladesh, became prime minister on 27 February 1991, 15 February 1996, and 1 October 2001.
- Bottom left: Sheikh Hasina, the longest-serving prime minister of Bangladesh, became prime minister on 12 June 1996, 29 December 2008, 5 January 2014, 30 December 2018, 7 January 2024.
- Bottom middle: Tarique Rahman, the current prime minister of Bangladesh, since 17 February 2026.

This article lists the prime ministers of Bangladesh, and includes persons sworn into the office of prime minister following the Proclamation of Independence and the establishment of the Provisional Government in 1971. Moreover it also lists the chief advisers of caretaker governments of Bangladesh, which is a position equivalent to that of the prime minister, and is sometimes colloquially referred to as the prime minister.

== List of officeholders ==
There have been ten prime ministers, one senior minister, five chief advisers, and one acting chief adviser of Bangladesh.

Political parties

Awami League (AL)
Bangladesh Krishak Sramik Awami League (BaKSAL)
Jatiyatabadi Ganatantrik Dal (Jagodal) / Bangladesh Nationalist Party (BNP)
Janadal / Jatiya Party (JP(E))

Other affiliations

Independent

Status

Acting prime minister/chief adviser

No.	Portrait	Name (Birth–Death) Constituency	Term of office			Political party (Coalition)	Elected	Ministry	Ref.
No.	Portrait	Name (Birth–Death) Constituency	Took office	Left office	Time in office	Political party (Coalition)	Elected	Ministry	Ref.
Provisional Government of Bangladesh (1971–1972)
1		Tajuddin Ahmad তাজউদ্দীন আহমদ (1925–1975); MP for Dacca-5 (National Assembly of Pakistan)	17 April 1971	12 January 1972	270 days	AL	—	Mujib I	
People's Republic of Bangladesh (1972–present)
1st parliamentary republic (1972–1975)
2		Sheikh Mujibur Rahman শেখ মুজিবুর রহমান (1920–1975); MP for Dacca-8 (National Assembly of Pakistan), until 1973 MP for Dacca-12, from 1973	12 January 1972	25 January 1975	3 years, 13 days	AL	—	Mujib II	
2		Sheikh Mujibur Rahman শেখ মুজিবুর রহমান (1920–1975); MP for Dacca-8 (National Assembly of Pakistan), until 1973 MP for Dacca-12, from 1973	12 January 1972	25 January 1975	3 years, 13 days	AL	1973	Mujib III	
Semi-presidential republic (1975–1991)
3		Muhammad Mansur Ali মুহাম্মদ মনসুর আলী (1917–1975); MP for Pabna-1	25 January 1975	15 August 1975 (Deposed in a coup)	202 days	BaKSAL	—	Mujib IV	
Post abolished (15 August 1975 – 29 June 1978)
—		Mashiur Rahman মশিউর রহমান (1924–1979); MP for Rangpur-1; Senior Minister	29 June 1978	12 March 1979 #	256 days	Jagodal / BNP	—	Ziaur Rahman	
Post vacant (12 March – 15 April 1979)
4		Shah Azizur Rahman শাহ আজিজুর রহমান (1925–1988); MP for Kushtia-3	15 April 1979	24 March 1982 (Deposed in a coup)	2 years, 343 days	BNP	1979	Ziaur Rahman	
4		Shah Azizur Rahman শাহ আজিজুর রহমান (1925–1988); MP for Kushtia-3	15 April 1979	24 March 1982 (Deposed in a coup)	2 years, 343 days	BNP	1979	Sattar	
Post abolished (24 March 1982 – 30 March 1984)
5		Ataur Rahman Khan আতাউর রহমান খান (1905–1991); Unelected	30 March 1984	1 January 1985	277 days	Janadal	—	Ershad	
Post vacant (1 January 1985 – 9 July 1986)
6		Mizanur Rahman Chowdhury মিজানুর রহমান চৌধুরী (1928–2006); MP for Chandpur-4	9 July 1986	27 March 1988	1 year, 262 days	JP(E)	1986	Ershad	
7		Moudud Ahmed মওদুদ আহমেদ (1940–2021); MP for Noakhali-1	27 March 1988	12 August 1989	1 year, 138 days	JP(E)	1988	Ershad	
8		Kazi Zafar Ahmed কাজী জাফর আহমেদ (1939–2015); MP for Comilla-12	12 August 1989	6 December 1990 (Note: Fled on the president's resignation.)	1 year, 116 days	JP(E)	—	Ershad	
Post vacant (6 December 1990 – 20 March 1991)
2nd parliamentary republic (1991–present)
9		Khaleda Zia খালেদা জিয়া (1946–2025); MP for Feni-1	20 March 1991	30 March 1996	5 years, 10 days	BNP	1991	Khaleda I	
9		Khaleda Zia খালেদা জিয়া (1946–2025); MP for Feni-1	20 March 1991	30 March 1996	5 years, 10 days	BNP	Feb 1996	Khaleda II	
—		Muhammad Habibur Rahman মুহাম্মদ হাবিবুর রহমান (1928–2014); Chief Adviser of the Caretaker Government	30 March 1996	23 June 1996	85 days	Independent	—	Habibur Rahman	
10		Sheikh Hasina শেখ হাসিনা (born 1947); MP for Gopalganj-3	23 June 1996	15 July 2001	5 years, 22 days	AL	Jun 1996	Hasina I	
—		Latifur Rahman লতিফুর রহমান (1936–2017); Chief Adviser of the Caretaker Government	15 July 2001	10 October 2001	87 days	Independent	—	Latifur Rahman	
(9)		Khaleda Zia খালেদা জিয়া (1946–2025); MP for Bogra-6	10 October 2001	29 October 2006	5 years, 19 days	BNP (Four Party Alliance)	2001	Khaleda III	
—		Iajuddin Ahmed ইয়াজউদ্দিন আহম্মেদ (1931–2012); Chief Adviser of the Caretaker Government (Note: Simultaneously served as President.)	29 October 2006	11 January 2007	74 days	Independent	—	Iajuddin Ahmed	
—		Fazlul Haque ফজলুল হক (1938–2023); Acting Chief Adviser of the Caretaker Government	11 January 2007	12 January 2007	1 day	Independent	—	—	
—		Fakhruddin Ahmed ফখরুদ্দীন আহমেদ (born 1940); Chief Adviser of the Caretaker Government	12 January 2007	6 January 2009	1 year, 360 days	Independent (with military support)	—	Fakhruddin Ahmed	
(10)		Sheikh Hasina শেখ হাসিনা (born 1947); MP for Gopalganj-3	6 January 2009	5 August 2024 (Note: Resigned and fled to India in the aftermath of the July Uprising.)	15 years, 212 days	AL (Grand Alliance)	2008	Hasina II	
(10)		Sheikh Hasina শেখ হাসিনা (born 1947); MP for Gopalganj-3	6 January 2009	5 August 2024	15 years, 212 days	AL (Grand Alliance)	2014	Hasina III	
(10)		Sheikh Hasina শেখ হাসিনা (born 1947); MP for Gopalganj-3	6 January 2009	5 August 2024	15 years, 212 days	AL (Grand Alliance)	2018	Hasina IV	
(10)		Sheikh Hasina শেখ হাসিনা (born 1947); MP for Gopalganj-3	6 January 2009	5 August 2024	15 years, 212 days	AL (Grand Alliance)	2024	Hasina V	
Post vacant (5 – 8 August 2024)
—		Muhammad Yunus মুহাম্মদ ইউনূস (born 1940); Chief Adviser of the Interim Government	8 August 2024	17 February 2026	1 year, 193 days	Independent	—	Yunus	
11		Tarique Rahman তারেক রহমান (born 1968); MP for Dhaka-17	17 February 2026	Incumbent	188 days	BNP	2026	Tarique Rahman	

== See also ==
- Caretaker government of Bangladesh
- Chief Adviser of Bangladesh
- Prime Minister of Bengal
- Politics of Bangladesh
- President of Bangladesh
  - List of presidents of Bangladesh
- List of office-holders in the Government of Bangladesh
- Vice President of Bangladesh
- Prime Minister of Bangladesh
- List of international trips made by prime ministers of Bangladesh
