= List of international presidential trips made by Nicolas Sarkozy =

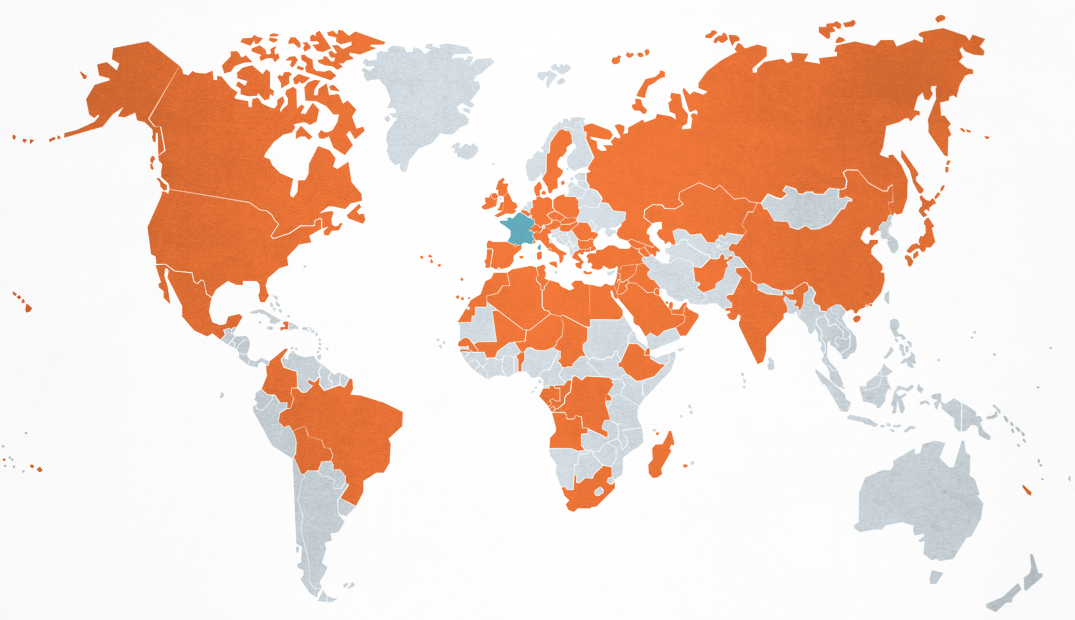
Map of international trips made by N.Sarkozy as president.

Nicolas Sarkozy, the 23rd President of France, made 92 presidential trips to 54 states internationally during his presidency, which began with his inauguration on 16 May 2007 and ended with the inauguration of François Hollande on 15 May 2012.

== Summary ==
The number of visits per country where President Sarkozy traveled are:

- One visit to Afghanistan, Algeria, Andorra, Angola, Armenia, Azerbaijan, Bahrain, Bulgaria, Canada, Czech Republic, Democratic Republic of the Congo, Denmark, Egypt, Gabon, Haiti, Iraq, Israel, Japan, Kazakhstan, Kuwait, Lebanon, Mexico, Monaco, Morocco, Niger, Oman, Qatar, Republic of the Congo, Romania, Rwanda, Saudi Arabia, Senegal, South Korea, Switzerland, Syria, Trinidad and Tobago, Tunisia and Turkey.
- Two visits to Brazil, Georgia, India, Italy, Libya, the United Arab Emirates and Vatican City.
- Three visits to China, Poland, Portugal, Russia, and Spain.
- Four visits to United Kingdom.
- Five visits to Belgium, and Germany.
- Eleven visits to the United States.

== 2007 ==
In 2007, after taking office on 16 May, President Nicolas Sarkozy made 18 international trips to 15 countries. The following were the international trips made by the president in 2007:

Country	Areas visited	Date(s)	Details	Image
Germany	Berlin	16 May	President Sarkozy travelled to Berlin on the day of his inauguration, making Germany the destination of his first trip abroad as president. He met with Chancellor Angela Merkel.	
Spain	Madrid	31 May	President Sarkozy met with Spanish Prime Minister José Luis Rodríguez Zapatero to discuss a simplified European treaty to replace the stalled European Constitution.	
Germany	Heiligendamm	6–8 June	President Sarkozy attended the 33rd G8 summit in Heiligendamm.	
Poland	Warsaw	14 June	President Sarkozy travelled to Warsaw to meet with Polish President Lech Kaczyński and discuss the European reform treaty.	
Belgium	Brussels	21–23 June	President Sarkozy travelled to Brussels to attend a European Council, where the 27 member states agreed on a mandate for the simplified treaty that became the Treaty of Lisbon.	
Libya	Tripoli	25 July	President Sarkozy travelled to Tripoli to meet with Muammar Gaddafi, one day after the release of the Bulgarian nurses and a Palestinian doctor detained in Libya. The visit was accompanied by agreements on cooperation, including civil nuclear energy.	
Senegal	Dakar	25–26 July	President Sarkozy travelled to Dakar after his stop in Libya and met with President Abdoulaye Wade. On 26 July he delivered a speech at the Cheikh Anta Diop University.	
United States	Kennebunkport, Wolfeboro	3–21 August	President Sarkozy spent a holiday in the United States, in New Hampshire, and met with U.S. President George W. Bush at the Bush family home in Kennebunkport.	
Bulgaria	Sofia	4–5 October	President Sarkozy and his wife Cécilia travelled to Sofia on an official visit following the release of the Bulgarian nurses in Libya.	
Russia	Moscow	9–10 October	President Sarkozy travelled to Moscow for his first visit to Russia as president, where he met with Russian President Vladimir Putin.	
Morocco	Marrakesh	22–24 October	President Sarkozy paid a state visit to Morocco, where he met with King Mohammed VI.	
United States	Washington, D.C., Mount Vernon	6–7 November	President Sarkozy paid a state visit to the United States. He met with President Bush and addressed a joint session of the United States Congress on 7 November.	
China	Beijing, Wuhan	25–27 November	President Sarkozy travelled to China on a state visit, where he met with President Hu Jintao.	
Algeria	Algiers, Constantine	3–5 December	President Sarkozy paid a state visit to Algeria, where he met with President Abdelaziz Bouteflika.	
Portugal	Lisbon	8–9 December	President Sarkozy travelled to Lisbon to attend the second EU–Africa Summit.	
Portugal	Lisbon	13 December	President Sarkozy returned to Lisbon for the signing of the Treaty of Lisbon.	
Vatican City	Vatican City	20 December	President Sarkozy met with Pope Benedict XVI and was named an honorary canon of the Archbasilica of St. John Lateran. In a speech he discussed relations between church and state in France.	
Egypt	Luxor, Sharm el-Sheikh	25–30 December	President Sarkozy travelled to Egypt with Carla Bruni and met with President Hosni Mubarak.	

== 2008 ==
In 2008, President Sarkozy made 23 international trips to 20 countries. The following were the international trips made by President Sarkozy during the year:

Country	Areas visited	Date(s)	Details	Image
Saudi Arabia	Riyadh	13 January	President Sarkozy began a tour of the Persian Gulf in Riyadh, where he met with King Abdullah.	
Qatar	Doha	14 January	President Sarkozy continued his Gulf tour in Doha, where he met with Emir Hamad bin Khalifa Al Thani.	
United Arab Emirates	Abu Dhabi	15 January	President Sarkozy concluded his Gulf tour in Abu Dhabi, where the two countries discussed cultural and defence cooperation, including a permanent French military base in the emirate.	
India	New Delhi	25–26 January	President Sarkozy paid a state visit to India and was the chief guest at the Republic Day parade on Rajpath on 26 January.	
United Kingdom	London, Windsor	26–27 March	President Sarkozy paid a state visit to the United Kingdom as the guest of Queen Elizabeth II.	
Romania	Bucharest	2–4 April	President Sarkozy attended the 2008 Bucharest summit. He and Chancellor Angela Merkel opposed granting Ukraine and Georgia a Membership Action Plan.	
Monaco	Monaco	25 April	President Sarkozy paid an official visit to Monaco, where he met with Prince Albert II.	
Tunisia	Tunis	28–30 April	President Sarkozy paid a state visit to Tunisia, where he met with President Zine El Abidine Ben Ali. His comments on freedoms in the country drew criticism from Reporters Without Borders.	
Angola	Luanda	23 May	President Sarkozy travelled to Luanda to meet with President José Eduardo dos Santos and mend relations strained by the Angolagate affair.	
Poland	Warsaw	28 May	President Sarkozy visited Poland ahead of France's presidency of the Council of the European Union, which began on 1 July 2008.	
Lebanon	Beirut	7 June	President Sarkozy travelled to Beirut to meet with President Michel Suleiman following the Doha Agreement.	
Czech Republic	Prague	16 June	President Sarkozy met with Czech Prime Minister Mirek Topolánek in Prague, ahead of the Czech Republic taking over the EU presidency after France.	
Israel	Jerusalem	22–24 June	President Sarkozy travelled to Israel on a state visit, during which he addressed the Knesset on 23 June.	
Japan	Tōyako	7–9 July	President Sarkozy attended the 34th G8 summit at Lake Tōya. He met with Chinese President Hu Jintao on the sidelines, and reportedly proposed expanding the G8 to include emerging economies such as China and India.	
Russia	Moscow	12 August	Following the outbreak of the Russo-Georgian War, President Sarkozy travelled to Moscow as the president of the Council of the European Union to meet with Russian President Dmitry Medvedev and negotiate a ceasefire.	
Georgia	Tbilisi	12 August	After meeting with President Medvedev, President Sarkozy travelled to Tbilisi, where he met with Georgian President Mikheil Saakashvili.	
Syria	Damascus	3–4 September	President Sarkozy travelled to Damascus to meet with Syrian President Bashar al-Assad, the first visit to Syria by a French president in several years. He also took part in a summit with the leaders of Qatar and Turkey.	
United States	New York City	22–24 September	President Sarkozy attended the sixty-third session of the United Nations General Assembly.	
Canada	Quebec City	17 October	President Sarkozy travelled to Quebec City to attend the 12th Francophonie Summit.	
United States	Camp David	18 October	President Sarkozy and European Commission President José Manuel Barroso met with President Bush at Camp David to discuss the financial crisis.	
United States	Washington, D.C.	14–15 November	President Sarkozy attended the 2008 G20 Washington summit.	
Poland	Gdańsk	6 December	President Sarkozy travelled to Gdańsk, where he met with the Dalai Lama on the sidelines of ceremonies marking the 25th anniversary of Lech Wałęsa's Nobel Peace Prize.	
Brazil	Rio de Janeiro	22–23 December	President Sarkozy travelled to Brazil, where he and President Luiz Inácio Lula da Silva signed major contracts, including for defence equipment.	

== 2009 ==
In 2009, President Sarkozy made 19 international trips to 18 countries. The following were the international trips made by President Sarkozy during the year:

Country	Areas visited	Date(s)	Details	Image
Iraq	Baghdad	10 February	President Sarkozy made a visit to Baghdad, where he met with Iraqi leaders.	
Oman	Muscat	11 February	After his visit to Iraq, President Sarkozy travelled to Muscat as part of a tour of the Persian Gulf and met with Sultan Qaboos bin Said.	
Bahrain	Manama	11 February	President Sarkozy continued to Manama, where he met with King Hamad.	
Kuwait	Kuwait City	11 February	President Sarkozy concluded the tour in Kuwait City, where he met with Emir Sabah Al-Ahmad Al-Jaber Al-Sabah.	
Mexico	Mexico City	9 March	President Sarkozy travelled to Mexico City, where he met with Mexican President Felipe Calderón and addressed the French community.	
Democratic Republic of the Congo	Kinshasa	26–27 March	President Sarkozy visited Kinshasa during a three-nation tour of Africa, where he met with President Joseph Kabila.	
Republic of the Congo	Brazzaville	26–27 March	President Sarkozy visited Brazzaville, where he met with President Denis Sassou Nguesso.	
Niger	Niamey	26–27 March	President Sarkozy visited Niamey, where he met with President Mamadou Tandja.	
United Kingdom	London	1–2 April	President Sarkozy attended the 2009 G20 London summit.	
Germany	Baden-Baden, Kehl	3–4 April	President Sarkozy co-hosted the 2009 Strasbourg–Kehl NATO summit with Chancellor Angela Merkel. On 3 April he welcomed NATO leaders at the Kurhaus in Baden-Baden for the opening working dinner.	
Spain	Madrid	27–28 April	President Sarkozy travelled to Madrid for a bilateral summit with Spanish Prime Minister José Luis Rodríguez Zapatero.	
United Arab Emirates	Abu Dhabi	25–26 May	President Sarkozy travelled to Abu Dhabi, where he inaugurated the French military base in the emirate.	
Italy	L'Aquila	8–10 July	President Sarkozy attended the 35th G8 summit in L'Aquila.	
United States	New York City, Pittsburgh	22–25 September	President Sarkozy attended the sixty-fourth session of the United Nations General Assembly and the 2009 G20 Pittsburgh summit. On 25 September, he appeared with President Barack Obama and British Prime Minister Gordon Brown to announce the discovery of a secret uranium enrichment facility in Iran.	
Kazakhstan	Astana	6 October	President Sarkozy travelled to Astana, where he met with President Nursultan Nazarbayev. The visit drew criticism from civil society activists regarding Kazakhstan's poor human rights record.	
Germany	Berlin	9 November	President Sarkozy travelled to Berlin to take part in the commemorations of the 20th anniversary of the Fall of the Berlin Wall.	
Brazil	Manaus	26–27 November	President Sarkozy met with President Lula da Silva, and the two announced a common position on climate goals ahead of the 2009 United Nations Climate Change Conference.	
Trinidad and Tobago	Port of Spain	27–29 November	President Sarkozy travelled to Port of Spain to attend the 2009 Commonwealth Heads of Government Meeting as a guest.	
Denmark	Copenhagen	17–18 December	President Sarkozy attended the 2009 United Nations Climate Change Conference in Copenhagen.	

== 2010 ==
In 2010, President Sarkozy made 17 international trips to 14 countries. The following were the international trips made by President Sarkozy during the year:

Country	Areas visited	Date(s)	Details	Image
Haiti	Port-au-Prince	17 February	President Sarkozy visited Port-au-Prince following the 2010 Haiti earthquake and met with President René Préval.	
Gabon	Libreville	24 February	President Sarkozy paid a state visit to Gabon, where he met with President Ali Bongo Ondimba.	
Rwanda	Kigali	25 February	President Sarkozy travelled to Kigali, the first visit to Rwanda by a French president since the Rwandan genocide, and met with President Paul Kagame.	
United States	Washington, D.C.	29–30 March	President Sarkozy travelled to Washington for a visit with President Obama.	
United States	Washington, D.C.	12–13 April	President Sarkozy attended the 2010 Nuclear Security Summit.	
China	Shanghai	28–30 April	President Sarkozy travelled to China and attended the opening ceremony of Expo 2010 in Shanghai.	
United Kingdom	London	18 June	President Sarkozy travelled to London to mark the 70th anniversary of Charles de Gaulle's Appeal of 18 June, and met with British Prime Minister David Cameron.	
Russia	Saint Petersburg	19 June	President Sarkozy met with President Medvedev in Russia.	
Andorra	Andorra la Vella	29 July	President Sarkozy visited Andorra in his capacity as one of the two co-princes.	
United States	New York City	20–22 September	President Sarkozy attended the sixty-fifth session of the United Nations General Assembly and the summit on the Millennium Development Goals.	
Vatican City	Vatican City	8 October	President Sarkozy met with Pope Benedict XVI.	
Switzerland	Montreux	22–24 October	President Sarkozy attended the 13th Francophonie Summit in Montreux.	
United Kingdom	London	2 November	President Sarkozy travelled to London for a summit with Prime Minister Cameron, where the two countries signed a defence cooperation treaty (the Lancaster House Treaties).	
South Korea	Seoul	11–12 November	President Sarkozy attended the 2010 G20 Seoul summit.	
Portugal	Lisbon	19–20 November	President Sarkozy attended the 2010 Lisbon summit of NATO.	
India	New Delhi, Mumbai	4–7 December	President Sarkozy travelled to India for his second visit as president, which included talks on civil nuclear cooperation.	
Belgium	Brussels	16–17 December	President Sarkozy travelled to Brussels to attend a European Council.	

== 2011 ==
In 2011, President Sarkozy made 11 international trips to 10 countries. The following were the international trips made by President Sarkozy during the year:

Country	Areas visited	Date(s)	Details	Image
United States	Washington, D.C.	9–10 January	President Sarkozy met with President Obama in Washington ahead of France's presidencies of the G8 and G20.	
Turkey	Ankara	25 February	President Sarkozy travelled to Ankara, where he met with Turkish President Abdullah Gül.	
China	Nanjing	30 March	President Sarkozy travelled to China to attend a G20 seminar on reform of the international monetary system.	
Italy	Rome	26 April	President Sarkozy travelled to Rome for a summit with Italian Prime Minister Silvio Berlusconi, where the two leaders discussed Schengen border controls following the Arab Spring.	
Belgium	Brussels	23–24 June	President Sarkozy travelled to Brussels to attend a European Council.	
Afghanistan	Kabul	12 July	In an unannounced visit, President Sarkozy travelled to Kabul to meet with Afghan President Hamid Karzai.	
Libya	Tripoli, Benghazi	15 September	President Sarkozy and British Prime Minister Cameron travelled to Libya, the first foreign leaders to visit after the fall of Tripoli in the Libyan civil war, and met with leaders of the National Transitional Council.	
United States	New York City	21–22 September	President Sarkozy attended the sixty-sixth session of the United Nations General Assembly and visited the Statue of Liberty.	
Armenia	Yerevan	6–7 October	President Sarkozy visited the capitals of the three countries of the South Caucasus during a regional tour, beginning in Yerevan.	
Azerbaijan	Baku	6–7 October	President Sarkozy continued to Baku.	
Georgia	Tbilisi	6–7 October	President Sarkozy concluded the tour in Tbilisi.	

== 2012 ==
In 2012, before leaving office on 15 May, President Sarkozy made four international trips to three countries. The following were the international trips made by President Sarkozy during the year:

Country	Areas visited	Date(s)	Details	Image
Germany	Berlin	9 January	President Sarkozy travelled to Berlin for a lunch with Chancellor Merkel, ahead of a Franco-German proposal on the European debt crisis.	
Spain	Madrid	16 January	President Sarkozy travelled to Madrid to meet with Spanish Prime Minister Mariano Rajoy.	
Belgium	Brussels	30 January	President Sarkozy travelled to Brussels to attend an informal European Council on the European debt crisis.	
Belgium	Brussels	2 March	President Sarkozy travelled to Brussels to attend a European Council. It was his last presidential trip.	

== See also ==
- Foreign relations of France
- List of international trips made by presidents of France
- List of international presidential trips made by François Hollande, his successor
