= List of international trips made by prime ministers of Bangladesh =

The following is a list of international prime ministerial trips made by prime ministers of Bangladesh in reverse chronological order.

== Sheikh Mujibur Rahman ==
Country	Areas visited	Date(s)	Note	Ref.
Soviet Union	Moscow	1-5 March 1972	Goodwill trip	
Canada	Ottawa	August 1973	1973 Commonwealth Heads of Government Meeting	
Algeria	Algiers	5–9 September 1973	4th Summit of the Non-Aligned Movement	
Japan	Tokyo	18-24 October 1973	Accompanied by Sheikh Rehana and Sheikh Russel	

== Khaleda Zia ==
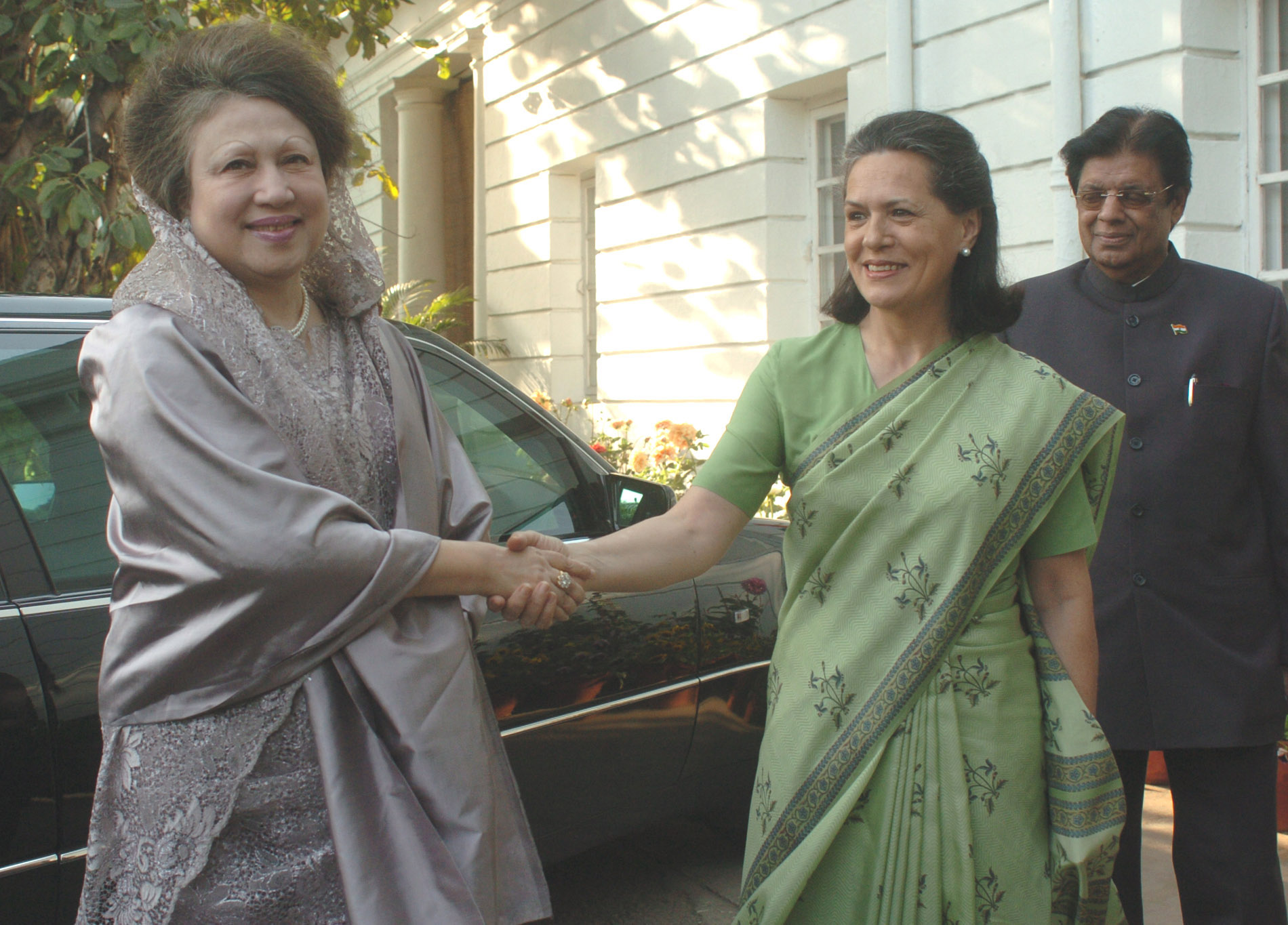
Prime Minister Khaleda Zia with Chairperson of the National Advisory Council Sonia Gandhi in New Delhi on March 21, 2003.

== Sheikh Hasina ==
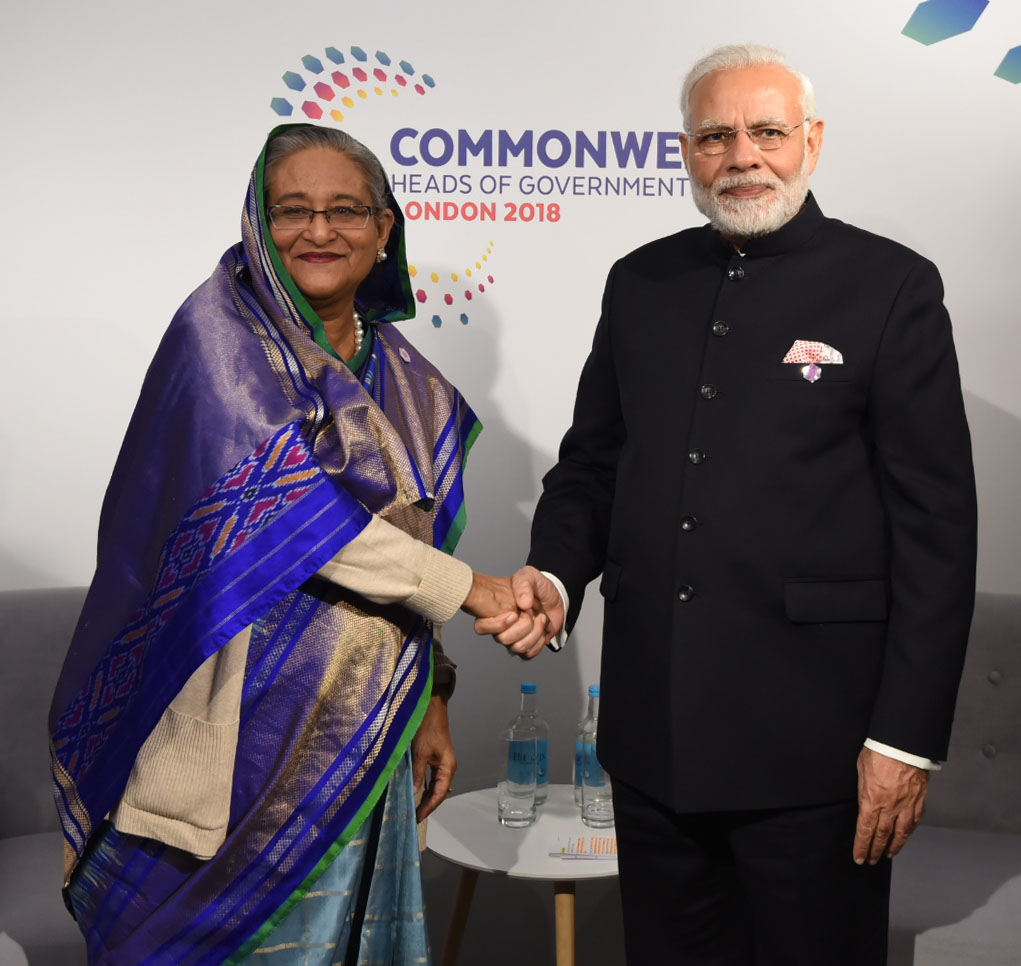
Prime Minister Narendra Modi with Prime Minister Sheikh Hasina on the sidelines of CHOGM 2018 in London.

== See also ==
- List of prime ministers of Bangladesh
