= List of international trips made by presidents of France =

The following is a list of international presidential trips made by presidents of France in chronological order since the start of Presidency of Nicolas Sarkozy in 2007.

== Summary ==
As of 19 November 2026, the number of visits per country/territory where Presidents have travelled since the start of Presidency of Nicolas Sarkozy in 2007 are:

- One visit to Albania, Bangladesh, Belarus, Burkina Faso, Cambodia, Colombia, Comoros, Cuba, Estonia, Finland, Ghana, Greenland, Guinea, Guinea-Bissau, Kenya, Laos, Mauritania, Mauritius, Moldova, Mongolia, Montenegro, North Macedonia, Oman, Pakistan, Papua New Guinea, Peru, Philippines, Serbia, Singapore, Sri Lanka, Thailand, Trinidad and Tobago, Uruguay, Uzbekistan, and Vanuatu.
- Two visits to Afghanistan, Austria, Bahrain, Benin, Cameroon, Chile, Croatia, Djibouti, Haiti, Iceland, Kuwait, Latvia, Libya, Madagascar, Malaysia, Norway, Republic of the Congo, Rwanda, and Syria.
- Three visits to Andorra, Argentina, Australia, Azerbaijan, Bulgaria, Central African Republic, Chad, Democratic Republic of the Congo, Denmark, Gabon, Georgia, Indonesia, Ireland, Ivory Coast (Côte d'Ivoire), Kazakhstan, Lithuania, Nigeria, Palestine, Slovenia, South Korea, and Vietnam.
- Four visits to Algeria, Angola, Ethiopia, Luxembourg, Mexico, Monaco, Niger, Senegal, South Africa, Sweden, and Ukraine.
- Five visits to Armenia, Canada, Cyprus, Czech Republic, Iraq, Israel, Jordan, Mali, Romania, and Turkey.
- Six visits to Greece, Lebanon, Malta, and Slovakia.
- Seven visits to Japan, Morocco, and Tunisia.
- Eight visits to Brazil and India.
- Nine visits to Egypt, Netherlands, Portugal, and Qatar.
- Ten visits to China, Saudi Arabia, United Arab Emirates, and Vatican City.
- Twelve visits to Russia.
- Thirteen visits to Switzerland.
- Fourteen visits to Poland.
- Sixteen visits to Spain.
- Twenty-one visits to Italy.
- Twenty-nine visits to the United Kingdom.
- Thirty-four visits to the United States.
- Sixty-seven visits to Germany.
- One-hundred and eight visits to Belgium.

Countries/Territories	International trips made by French Presidents			
Countries/Territories	Nicolas Sarkozy (2007–2012)	François Hollande (2012–2017)	Emmanuel Macron (since 2017)	Total (Since 2007)
Afghanistan	1 (2011)	1 (2012)	none	2 (2011, 2012)
Albania	none	none	1 (2025)	1 (2025)
Algeria	1 (2007)	1 (2013)	2 (2017, 2022)	4 (2007, 2013, 2017, 2022)
Andorra	1 (2010)	none	2 (2019, 2026)	3 (2010, 2019, 2026)
Angola	1 (2008)	1 (2015)	2 (2023, 2025)	4 (2008, 2015, 2023, 2025)
Argentina	none	1 (2016)	2 (2018, 2024)	3 (2016, 2018, 2024)
Armenia	1 (2011)	2 (2014, 2015)	2 (2018, 2026)	5 (2011, 2014, 2015, 2018, 2026)
Australia	none	2 (2014)	1 (2018)	3 (2014, 2018)
Austria	none	none	2 (2017, 2018)	2 (2017, 2018)
Azerbaijan	1 (2011)	2 (2014, 2015)	none	3 (2011, 2014, 2015)
Bahrain	1 (2009)	none	1 (2026)	2 (2009, 2026)
Bangladesh	none	none	1 (2023)	1 (2023)
Belarus	none	1 (2015)	none	1 (2015)
Belgium	5 (2007–2012)	42 (2012–2017)	61 (2017–2026)	108 (2007–2026)
Benin	none	1 (2015)	1 (2023)	2 (2015, 2023)
Brazil	2 (2008, 2009)	3 (2012, 2013, 2016)	3 (2024, 2025)	8 (2008, 2009, 2012, 2013, 2016, 2024, 2025)
Bulgaria	1 (2007)	none	2 (2017, 2018)	3 (2007, 2017, 2018)
Cambodia	none	none	1 (2026)	1 (2026)
Cameroon	none	1 (2015)	1 (2022)	2 (2015, 2022)
Canada	1 (2008)	1 (2014)	3 (2018, 2024, 2025)	5 (2008, 2014, 2018, 2024, 2025)
CAR	none	3 (2013, 2014, 2016)	none	3 (2013, 2014, 2016)
Chad	none	1 (2014)	2 (2018, 2021)	3 (2014, 2018, 2021)
Chile	none	1 (2017)	1 (2024)	2 (2017, 2024)
China	3 (2007, 2010, 2011)	3 (2013, 2015, 2016)	4 (2018, 2019, 2023, 2025)	10 (2007, 2010, 2011, 2013, 2015, 2016, 2018, 2019, 2023, 2025)
Colombia	none	1 (2017)	none	1 (2017)
Comoros	none	1 (2014)	none	1 (2014)
Croatia	none	none	2 (2021, 2026)	2 (2021, 2026)
Cuba	none	1 (2015)	none	1 (2015)
Cyprus	none	1 (2015)	4 (2019, 2024, 2026)	5 (2015, 2019, 2024, 2026)
Czech Republic	1 (2008)	1 (2016)	3 (2018, 2022, 2024)	5 (2008, 2016, 2018, 2022, 2024)
DRC	1 (2009)	1 (2012)	1 (2023)	3 (2009, 2012, 2023)
Denmark	1 (2009)	none	2 (2018, 2025)	3 (2009, 2018, 2025)
Egypt	1 (2007)	2 (2015, 2016)	6 (2019, 2022, 2023, 2025, 2026)	9 (2007, 2015, 2016, 2019, 2022, 2023, 2025, 2026)
Estonia	none	none	1 (2017)	1 (2017)
Ethiopia	none	1 (2013)	3 (2019, 2024, 2026)	4 (2013, 2019, 2024, 2026)
Finland	none	none	1 (2018)	1 (2018)
Gabon	1 (2010)	none	2 (2023)	3 (2010, 2023)
Georgia	2 (2008, 2011)	1 (2014)	none	3 (2008, 2011, 2014)
Germany	5 (2007, 2009, 2012)	22 (2012–2017)	40 (2017–2026)	67 (2007–2026)
Ghana	none	none	1 (2017)	1 (2017)
Greece	none	3 (2013, 2015, 2016)	3 (2017, 2021, 2026)	6 (2013, 2015, 2016, 2017, 2021, 2026)
Guinea	none	1 (2014)	none	1 (2014)
Haiti	1 (2010)	1 (2015)	none	2 (2010, 2015)
Iceland	none	1 (2015)	1 (2023)	2 (2015, 2023)
India	2 (2008, 2010)	2 (2013, 2016)	4 (2018, 2023, 2024, 2026)	8 (2008, 2010, 2013, 2016, 2018, 2023, 2024, 2026)
Indonesia	none	1 (2017)	2 (2022, 2025)	3 (2017, 2022, 2025)
Iraq	1 (2009)	2 (2014, 2017)	2 (2020, 2021)	5 (2009, 2014, 2017, 2020, 2021)
Ireland	none	1 (2016)	2 (2021, 2026)	3 (2016, 2021, 2026)
Israel	1 (2008)	2 (2013, 2016)	2 (2020, 2023)	5 (2008, 2013, 2016, 2020, 2023)
Italy	2 (2009, 2011)	8 (2012–2016)	11 (2017–2025)	21 (2009, 2011–2025)
Ivory Coast	none	1 (2014)	2 (2017, 2019)	3 (2014, 2017, 2019)
Japan	1 (2008)	2 (2013, 2016)	4 (2019, 2021, 2023, 2026)	7 (2008, 2013, 2016, 2019, 2021, 2023, 2026)
Jordan	none	2 (2013, 2016)	3 (2022, 2023)	5 (2013, 2016, 2022, 2023)
Kazakhstan	1 (2009)	1 (2013)	1 (2023)	3 (2009, 2013, 2023)
Kuwait	1 (2009)	none	1 (2026)	2 (2009, 2026)
Laos	none	1 (2012)	none	1 (2012)
Latvia	none	1 (2013)	1 (2020)	2 (2013, 2020)
Lebanon	1 (2008)	2 (2012, 2016)	3 (2020, 2025)	6 (2008, 2012, 2016, 2020, 2025)
Libya	2 (2007, 2011)	none	none	2 (2007, 2011)
Lithuania	none	1 (2013)	2 (2020, 2023)	3 (2013, 2020, 2023)
Luxembourg	none	1 (2015)	3 (2017, 2018, 2025)	4 (2015, 2017, 2018, 2025)
Macedonia (Note: North Macedonia was officially known as the Republic of Macedonia during Jacques Chirac's visit in 1999.)	none	none	none	1 (1999)
Madagascar	none	1 (2016)	1 (2025)	2 (2016, 2025)
Malaysia	none	1 (2017)	1 (2026)	2 (2017, 2026)
Mali	none	3 (2013, 2014, 2017)	2 (2017)	5 (2013, 2014, 2017)
Malta	none	4 (2012, 2015, 2017)	2 (2019, 2023)	6 (2012, 2015, 2017, 2019, 2023)
Mexico	1 (2009)	2 (2012, 2014)	1 (2025)	4 (2009, 2012, 2014, 2025)
Moldova	none	none	1 (2023)	1 (2023)
Monaco	1 (2008)	1 (2013)	2 (2025)	4 (2008, 2013, 2025)
Morocco	1 (2007)	3 (2013, 2015, 2016)	3 (2018, 2024)	7 (2007, 2013, 2015, 2016, 2018, 2024)
Netherlands	none	2 (2014, 2016)	7 (2018, 2021, 2023, 2025, 2026)	9 (2014, 2016, 2018, 2021, 2023, 2025, 2026)
Niger	1 (2009)	1 (2014)	2 (2017, 2019)	4 (2009, 2014, 2017, 2019)
Nigeria	none	2 (2014, 2016)	1 (2018)	3 (2014, 2016, 2018)
Norway	none	1 (2014)	1 (2025)	2 (2014, 2025)
Oman	1 (2009)	none	none	1 (2009)
Pakistan	none	none	none	4 (2008, 2009, 2011, 2013)
Palestine (Note: Prior to France recognition of the State of Palestine in September 2025, the term Occupied Palestinian territories was used by the Quai d'Orsay.)	none	1 (2015)	2 (2020, 2023)	3 (2015, 2020, 2023)
Peru	none	1 (2016)	none	1 (2016)
Philippines	none	1 (2015)	none	1 (2015)
Poland	3 (2007, 2008)	6 (2012, 2013, 2014, 2015, 2016)	5 (2020, 2024, 2026)	14 (2007, 2008, 2012, 2013, 2014, 2015, 2016, 2020, 2024, 2026)
Portugal	3 (2007, 2010)	2 (2015, 2016)	4 (2018, 2021, 2022, 2025)	9 (2007, 2010, 2015, 2016, 2018, 2021, 2022, 2025)
Qatar	1 (2008)	2 (2013, 2015)	6 (2017, 2022, 2023, 2026)	9 (2008, 2013, 2015, 2017, 2022, 2023, 2026)
Republic of the Congo	1 (2009)	none	1 (2023)	2 (2009, 2023)
Romania	1 (2008)	1 (2016)	3 (2017, 2019, 2022)	5 (2008, 2016, 2017, 2019, 2022)
Russia	3 (2007, 2008, 2010)	5 (2012, 2013, 2014, 2015)	4 (2018, 2022)	12 (2007, 2008, 2010, 2012–2015, 2018, 2022)
Rwanda	1 (2010)	none	1 (2021)	2 (2010, 2021)
Saudi Arabia	1 (2008)	5 (2012, 2014, 2015)	4 (2017, 2021, 2024, 2026)	10 (2008, 2012, 2014, 2015, 2017, 2021, 2024, 2026)
Senegal	1 (2007)	2 (2012, 2014)	1 (2018)	4 (2007, 2012, 2014, 2018)
Singapore	none	1 (2017)	none	1 (2017)
Slovakia	none	3 (2013, 2015)	3 (2018, 2023)	6 (2013, 2015, 2018, 2023)
Slovenia	none	1 (2013)	2 (2021, 2025)	3 (2013, 2021, 2025)
South Africa	none	2 (2013, 2016)	2 (2021, 2025)	4 (2013, 2016, 2021, 2025)
South Korea	1 (2010)	1 (2016)	1 (2026)	3 (2010, 2016, 2026)
Spain	3 (2007, 2012)	5 (2012, 2013, 2015, 2017)	8 (2018, 2021, 2023, 2025, 2026)	16 (2007, 2012, 2013, 2015, 2017, 2018, 2021, 2023, 2025, 2026)
Sweden	none	none	4 (2017, 2024, 2026)	4 (2017, 2024, 2026)
Switzerland	1 (2010)	4 (2013, 2014, 2015, 2016)	8 (2018, 2020, 2023, 2026)	13 (2010, 2013–2016, 2018, 2020, 2023, 2026)
Syria	1 (2008)	none	1 (2026)	2 (2008, 2026)
Trinidad and Tobago	1 (2009)	none	none	1 (2009)
Tunisia	1 (2008)	3 (2013, 2014, 2015)	3 (2018, 2022)	7 (2008, 2013, 2014, 2015, 2018, 2022)
Turkey	1 (2011)	1 (2014)	3 (2018, 2026)	5 (2011, 2014, 2018, 2026)
Ukraine	none	1 (2015)	3 (2022, 2025)	4 (2015, 2022, 2025)
United Arab Emirates	2 (2008, 2009)	2 (2013, 2016)	6 (2017, 2021, 2022, 2023, 2026)	10 (2008, 2009, 2013, 2016, 2017, 2021, 2022, 2023, 2026)
United Kingdom	4 (2008, 2009, 2010)	7 (2012, 2013, 2014, 2016)	18 (2018–2026)	29 (2008–2010, 2012–2014, 2016, 2018–2026)
United States	11 (2007–2011)	10 (2012–2016)	13 (2017–2026)	34 (2007–2026)
Uruguay	none	1 (2016)	none	1 (2016)
Vanuatu	none	none	1 (2023)	1 (2023)
Vatican City	2 (2007, 2010)	2 (2014, 2016)	6 (2018, 2021, 2022, 2025, 2026)	10 (2007, 2010, 2014, 2016, 2018, 2021, 2022, 2025, 2026)
Vietnam	none	1 (2016)	2 (2025)	3 (2016, 2025)

== Charles de Gaulle (1944–1946, 1959–1969) ==
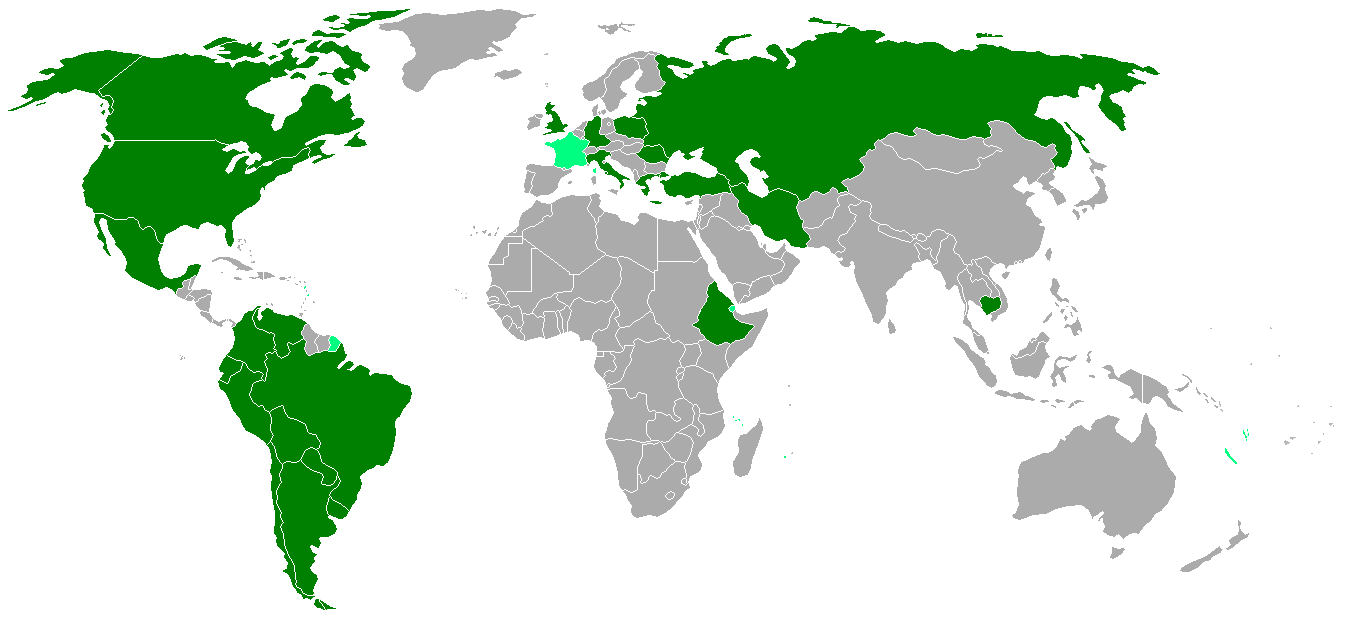
Countries visited by Charles de Gaulle as president

In August 1945, de Gaulle became the first incumbent French President to visit the United States.

== Nicolas Sarkozy (2007–2012) ==
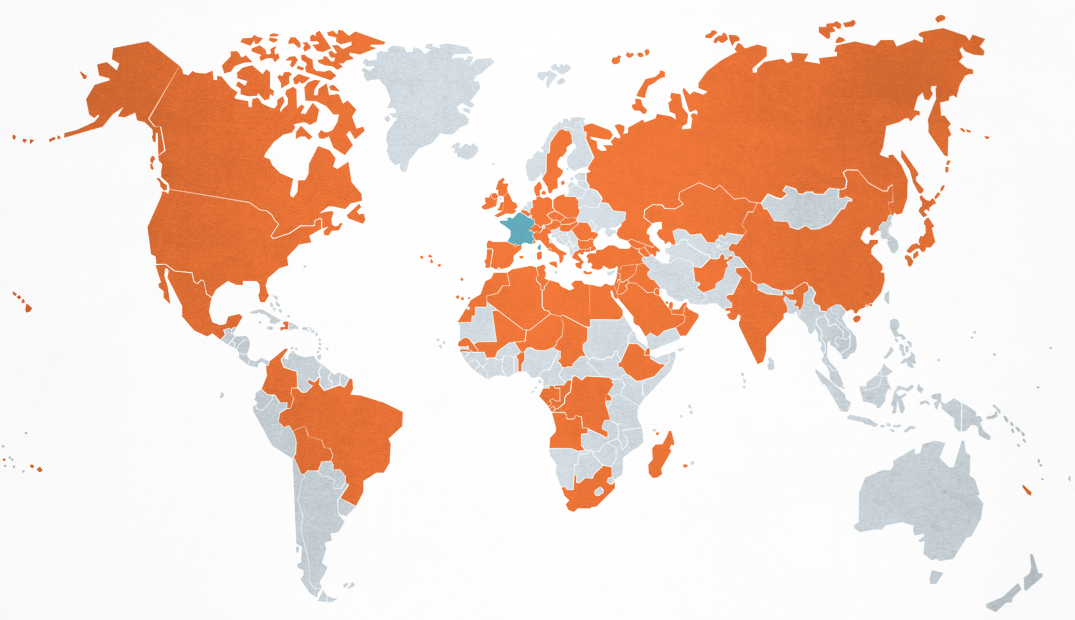
Countries visited by Nicolas Sarkozy during his presidency

Nicolas Sarkozy, the 23rd President of France, made 92 presidential trips to 54 states internationally during his presidency.

== François Hollande (2012–2017) ==
Countries visited by François Hollande during his presidency

François Hollande, the 24th President of France, made 183 presidential trips to 83 states internationally during his presidency.

== Emmanuel Macron (since 2017) ==
Countries visited by Emmanuel Macron during his presidency

Emmanuel Macron, the 25th and current President of France, made 349 presidential trips to 101 states during his presidency. In June 2025, Macron became the first incumbent French President and the first foreign head of state to visit Greenland since U.S. President Donald Trump's threats of annexation. In June 2026, Macron became the first incumbent French President to visit Montenegro.

== First visit by country ==
Countries by first incumbent French presidential visit
Country	Date	President	Ref.
United States	22 August 1945	Charles de Gaulle	
Greenland	15 June 2025	Emmanuel Macron	
Montenegro	4 June 2026 (Note: First visit post-independence)	Emmanuel Macron	

== See also ==
- Foreign relations of France
