= Bhadra Union =

Bhadra Union ভাদ্রা ইউনিয়ন
- Location of Bhadra in Bangladesh
- Coordinates: 24.051617506111246°N 89.83302712440491°E
- Country: Bangladesh
- Division: Dhaka Division
- District: Tangail District
- Upazila: Nagarpur Upazila
- Established on: 1984

Government
  - Type: Union Council
  - Chairman: Md Habibur Rahman Khan(Bangladesh Nationalist Party)

Area
  - Total: 21.86 km^{2} (8.44 sq mi)
- Elevation: 14 m (46 ft)

Population (2011)
  - Total: 21,950
  - Density: 1,004/km^{2} (2,601/sq mi)
- Time zone: UTC+6 (BST)
- Postal code: 1937
- Website: bhadraup.tangail.gov.bd

Bhadra Union (Bengali: ভাদ্রা ইউনিয়ন) is a union of Nagarpur Upazila, Tangail District, Bangladesh. It is situated 8 km south of Nagarpur and 31 km south of Tangail city.

== Demographics ==
According to Population Census 2011 performed by Bangladesh Bureau of Statistics, The total population of Bhadra union is 21,950. There are 5,101 households in total.

== Education ==
The literacy rate of Bhadra Union is 41.3% (Male-46.2%, Female-36.9%).

== See also ==
- Union Councils of Tangail District
