= Mamudnagar Union =

Mamudnagar Union মামুদনগর ইউনিয়ন
- Location of Mamudnagar in Bangladesh
- Coordinates: 24.04807081854556°N 89.89018499851227°E
- Country: Bangladesh
- Division: Dhaka Division
- District: Tangail District
- Upazila: Nagarpur Upazila
- Established: 1984

Government
  - Type: Union Council
  - Chairman: Md Anwar Hossain

Area
  - Total: 32.2 km^{2} (12.4 sq mi)
- Elevation: 14 m (46 ft)

Population (2011)
  - Total: 38,410
  - Density: 1,190/km^{2} (3,090/sq mi)
- Time zone: UTC+6 (BST)
- Postal code: 1936
- Website: mamudnagarup.tangail.gov.bd

Mamudnagar Union (Bengali: মামুদনগর ইউনিয়ন) is a union of Nagarpur Upazila, Tangail District, Bangladesh. It is situated 2 kilometres (1.2 mi) east of Nagarpur and 26 kilometres (16 mi) south of Tangail city.

== Demographics ==
According to the 2011 Bangladesh census, Mamudnagar Union had 9,112 households and a population of 38,410. The literacy rate (age 7 and over) was 32.5% (male: 35.8%, female: 29.6%).

== See also ==
- Union Councils of Tangail District
