= Sahabatpur Union =

Sahabatpur Union সহবতপুর ইউনিয়ন
- Location of Sahabatpur Union in Bangladesh
- Coordinates: 24.08682433017337°N 89.87813115119934°E
- Country: Bangladesh
- Division: Dhaka Division
- District: Tangail District
- Upazila: Nagarpur Upazila
- Established on: 1984

Government
  - Type: Union Council
  - Chairman: Md Tofayel Mollah

Area
  - Total: 23.85 km^{2} (9.21 sq mi)
- Elevation: 14 m (46 ft)

Population (2011)
  - Total: 27,533
  - Density: 1,154/km^{2} (2,990/sq mi)
- Time zone: UTC+6 (BST)
- Postal code: 1936
- Website: sahabatpurup.tangail.gov.bd

Sahabatpur Union (Bengali: সহবতপুর ইউনিয়ন) is a union of Nagarpur Upazila, Tangail District, Bangladesh. It is situated 4 km north of Nagarpur and 22 km south of Tangail.

== Demographics ==
According to Population Census 2011 performed by Bangladesh Bureau of Statistics, The total population of Sahabatpur union is 27,533 .There are households 6,576 in total.

== Education ==
The literacy rate of Sahabatpur Union is 46.7% (Male-49.9%, Female-43.9%).

== See also ==
- Union Councils of Tangail District
