= Mokna Union =

Mokna Union মোকনা ইউনিয়ন
- Location of Mokna in Bangladesh
- Coordinates: 24.03799847554893°N 89.96564090251923°E
- Country: Bangladesh
- Division: Dhaka Division
- District: Tangail District
- Upazila: Nagarpur Upazila
- Established on: 1984

Government
  - Type: Union Council
  - Chairman: Md Ataur Rahman Khan(Bangladesh Nationalist Party)

Area
  - Total: 23.84 km^{2} (9.20 sq mi)
- Elevation: 14 m (46 ft)

Population (2011)
  - Total: 22,040
  - Density: 924.5/km^{2} (2,394/sq mi)
- Time zone: UTC+6 (BST)
- Postal code: 1936
- Website: Moknaup.tangail.gov.bd

Mokna Union (Bengali: মোকনা ইউনিয়ন) is a union of Nagarpur Upazila, Tangail District, Bangladesh. It is situated 12 km east of Nagarpur and 36 km southeast of Tangail city.

== Demographics ==
According to the Population Census of 2011 performed by Bangladesh Bureau of Statistics, the total population of the Mokna union is 22,040 and there are 5,246 households in total.

== Education ==
The literacy rate of Mokna Union is 42.4% (Male-46%, Female-39.3%).

== See also ==
- Union Councils of Tangail District
