= Tangail Sadar Upazila =

Tangail Sadar টাঙ্গাইল সদর
- Upazila
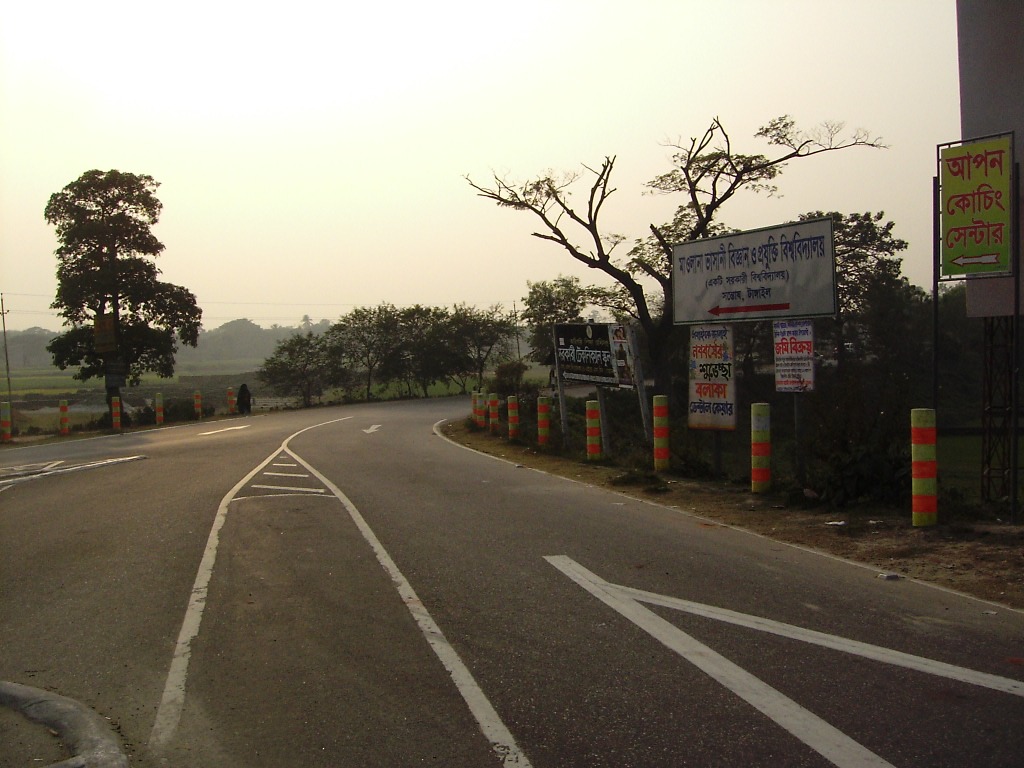
- Entrance of Tangail Sadar

- Coordinates: 24.257307°N 89.927783°E
- Country: Bangladesh
- Division: Dhaka
- District: Tangail
- Headquarters: Tangail

Area
  - Total: 334.26 km^{2} (129.06 sq mi)

Population (2022)
  - Total: 601,227
  - Density: 1,798.7/km^{2} (4,658.6/sq mi)
- Time zone: UTC+6 (BST)
- Postal code: 1900
- Area code: 0921
- Website: www.tangail.gov.bd

Tangail Sadar (Bengali: টাঙ্গাইল সদর) is an upazila of Tangail District in Dhaka Division, Bangladesh.

Tangail Sadar Upazila mauza geocode map

== Geography ==
Tangail Sadar is located at 24.2500°N 89.9167°E. It has 116,922 households and total area 334.26 km^{2}. The upazila is surrounded by Kalihati Upazila on the north, Nagarpur and Delduar Upazila on the south, Kalihati and Basail upazilas on the east, and the Jamuna River on the west.

== Demographics ==
Religions in Tangail Sadar Upazila (2022)
Religion	Percent
Islam	93.36%
Hinduism	6.60%
Other or not stated	0.04%

According to the 2022 Bangladeshi census, Tangail Sadar Upazila had 147,030 households and a population of 601,227. 8.04% of the population were under 5 years of age. Tangail Sadar had a literacy rate (age 7 and over) of 74.43%: 77.63% for males and 71.34% for females, and a sex ratio of 97.40 males for every 100 females. 236,657 (39.36%) lived in urban areas.

According to the 2011 Census of Bangladesh, Tangail Sadar Upazila had 116,922 households and a population of 521,104. 112,157 (21.52%) were under 10 years of age. Tangail Sadar had a literacy rate (age 7 and over) of 53.06%, compared to the national average of 51.8%, and a sex ratio of 1003 females per 1000 males. 167,412 (32.13%) lived in urban areas.

== Administration ==
Tangail Sadar Upazila is divided into Tangail Municipality and 12 union parishads: Baghil, Danya, Gala, Gharinda, Hugra, Karatia, Katuli, Kakua, Magra, Mahamudnagar, Porabari, and Silimpur. The union parishads are subdivided into 247 mauzas and 276 villages.

Tangail Municipality is subdivided into 18 wards and 64 mahallas.

== See also ==
- Union Councils of Tangail District
- Upazilas of Bangladesh
- Districts of Bangladesh
- Divisions of Bangladesh
