= Bharra Union =

Bharrah Union ভাড়রা ইউনিয়ন
- Location of Gharinda in Bangladesh
- Coordinates: 24.144658502522596°N 89.84830498695374°E
- Country: Bangladesh
- Division: Dhaka Division
- District: Tangail District
- Upazila: Nagarpur Upazila
- Established on: 1984

Government
  - Type: Union Council

Area
  - Total: 38.08 km^{2} (14.70 sq mi)
- Elevation: 16 m (52 ft)

Population (2011)
  - Total: 30,743
  - Density: 807.3/km^{2} (2,091/sq mi)
- Time zone: UTC+6 (BST)
- Postal code: 1936
- Website: bharraup.tangail.gov.bd

Bharrah Union (Bengali: ভাড়রা ইউনিয়ন) is a union of Nagarpur Upazila, Tangail District, Bangladesh. It is situated 8 km northwest of Nagarpur and 28 km south of Tangail city.

== Demographics ==
According to Population Census 2011 performed by Bangladesh Bureau of Statistics, The total population of Bharra union is 30,743. There are 6,901 households in total.

== Education ==
The literacy rate of Bharrah Union is 36.8% (Male-49%, Female-34.8%). Arrah Government Primary School Bharrah Umesh Chandra High School Bharrah Primary School & Others!

== See also ==
- Union Councils of Tangail District
