= Bekra Union =

Bekra Union বেকড়া ইউনিয়ন
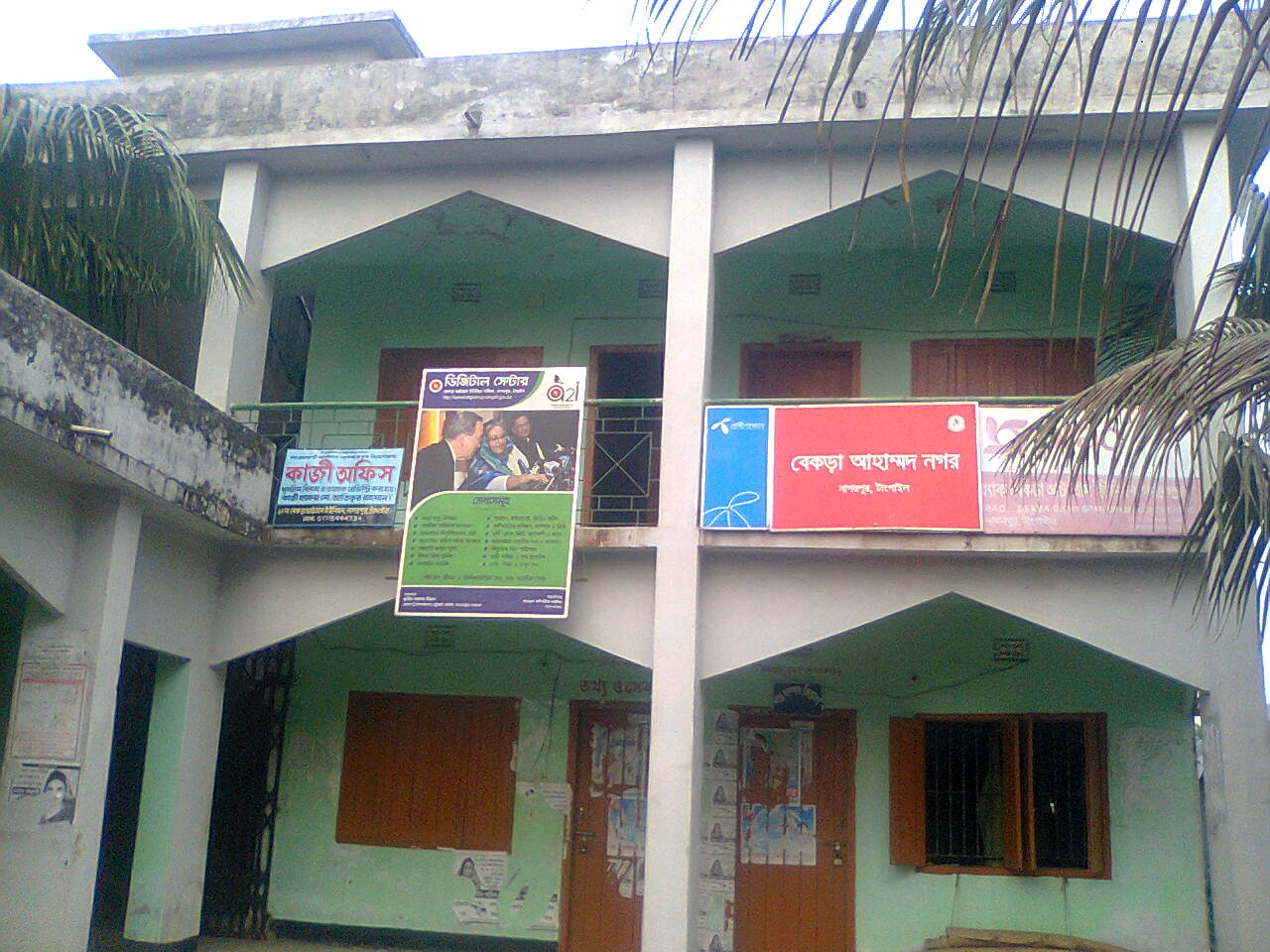
- Bekra Union Parishad Complex, Nagpur, Tangail, Bangladesh

- Location of Bekra in Bangladesh
- Coordinates: 24.051617506111246°N 89.83302712440491°E
- Country: Bangladesh
- Division: Dhaka Division
- District: Tangail District
- Upazila: Nagarpur Upazila
- Established on: 1984

Government
  - Type: Union Council
  - Chairman: Md Showkot Hossain(Bangladesh Awami League)

Area
  - Total: 10.6 km^{2} (4.1 sq mi)
- Elevation: 15 m (49 ft)

Population (2011)
  - Total: 10,811
  - Density: 1,020/km^{2} (2,640/sq mi)
- Time zone: UTC+6 (BST)
- Postal code: 1938
- Website: bekraup.tangail.gov.bd

Bekra Union (Bengali: বেকড়া ইউনিয়ন) is a union of Nagarpur Upazila, Tangail District, Bangladesh. It is situated 3 km west of Nagarpur and 27 km south of Tangail city.

== Demographics ==
According to Population Census 2011 performed by Bangladesh Bureau of Statistics, The total population of Bekra union is 10,811. There are 2,487 households in total.

== Education ==
The literacy rate of Bekra Union is 45.8% (Male-48.3%, Female-43.7%).

== See also ==
- Union Councils of Tangail District
