= Dhubaria Union =

Dhubaria Union ধুবরিয়া ইউনিয়ন
- Location of Dhubaria in Bangladesh
- Coordinates: 24°0′15.804″N 89°50′54.1284″E
- Country: Bangladesh
- Division: Dhaka Division
- District: Tangail District
- Upazila: Nagarpur Upazila
- Established on: 1984

Government
  - Type: Union Council
  - Chairman: Md Motiar Rahman(Bangladesh Awami League)

Area
  - Total: 11.72 km^{2} (4.53 sq mi)
- Elevation: 11 m (36 ft)

Population (2011)
  - Total: 12,760
  - Density: 1,089/km^{2} (2,820/sq mi)
- Time zone: UTC+6 (BST)
- Postal code: 1937
- Website: dhubariaup.tangail.gov.bd

Dhubaria Union (Bengali: ধুবরিয়া ইউনিয়ন) is a union of Nagarpur Upazila, Tangail District, Bangladesh. It is situated 6 km south of Nagarpur and 30 km south of Tangail city.

== Demographics ==
According to Population Census 2011 performed by Bangladesh Bureau of Statistics, The total population of Dhubaria union is 12,760. There are 2,958 households in total.

== Education ==
The literacy rate of Dhubaria Union is 47.4% (Male-52.4%, Female-43.1%).

== Transport ==
There is a direct bus service from Dhaka to Dhubaria via Manikganj District called "Village Line". The buses start from Gabtoli Bus Terminal, Mirpur, Dhaka. Last stoppage of this bus service is Dhubaria Bazar, Nagarpur, Tangail.

== Notable residents ==
- Tarana Halim, Actress, Lawyer & Politician
- Md Jamilur Rahman Miron, Politician, Four times elected Mayor of Tangail city

== See also ==
- Union Councils of Tangail District
