= Duptiair Union =

Duptiair Union দপ্তিয়র ইউনিয়ন
- Location of Gharinda in Bangladesh
- Coordinates: 23.990957630458166°N 89.7982120513916°E
- Country: Bangladesh
- Division: Dhaka Division
- District: Tangail District
- Upazila: Nagarpur Upazila
- Established on: 1984

Government
  - Type: Union Council
  - Chairman: M. Firoz Siddiqui (Bangladesh Nationalist Party)

Area
  - Total: 27.47 km^{2} (10.61 sq mi)
- Elevation: 12 m (39 ft)

Population (2011)
  - Total: 26,336
  - Density: 958.7/km^{2} (2,483/sq mi)
- Time zone: UTC+6 (BST)
- Postal code: 1937
- Website: duptiairup.tangail.gov.bd

Duptiair Union (Bengali: দপ্তিয়র ইউনিয়ন) is a union of Nagarpur Upazila, Tangail District, Bangladesh. It is situated 12 km south of Nagarpur and 36 km south of Tangail city.

== Demographics ==
According to Population Census 2011 performed by Bangladesh Bureau of Statistics, The total population of Duptiair union is 26,336. There are 5,677 households in total.

== Education ==
The literacy rate of Duptiair Union is 35.6% (Male-41.4%, Female-30.1%).

== See also ==
- Union Councils of Tangail District
