= Gayhata Union =

Gayhata Union গয়হাটা ইউনিয়ন
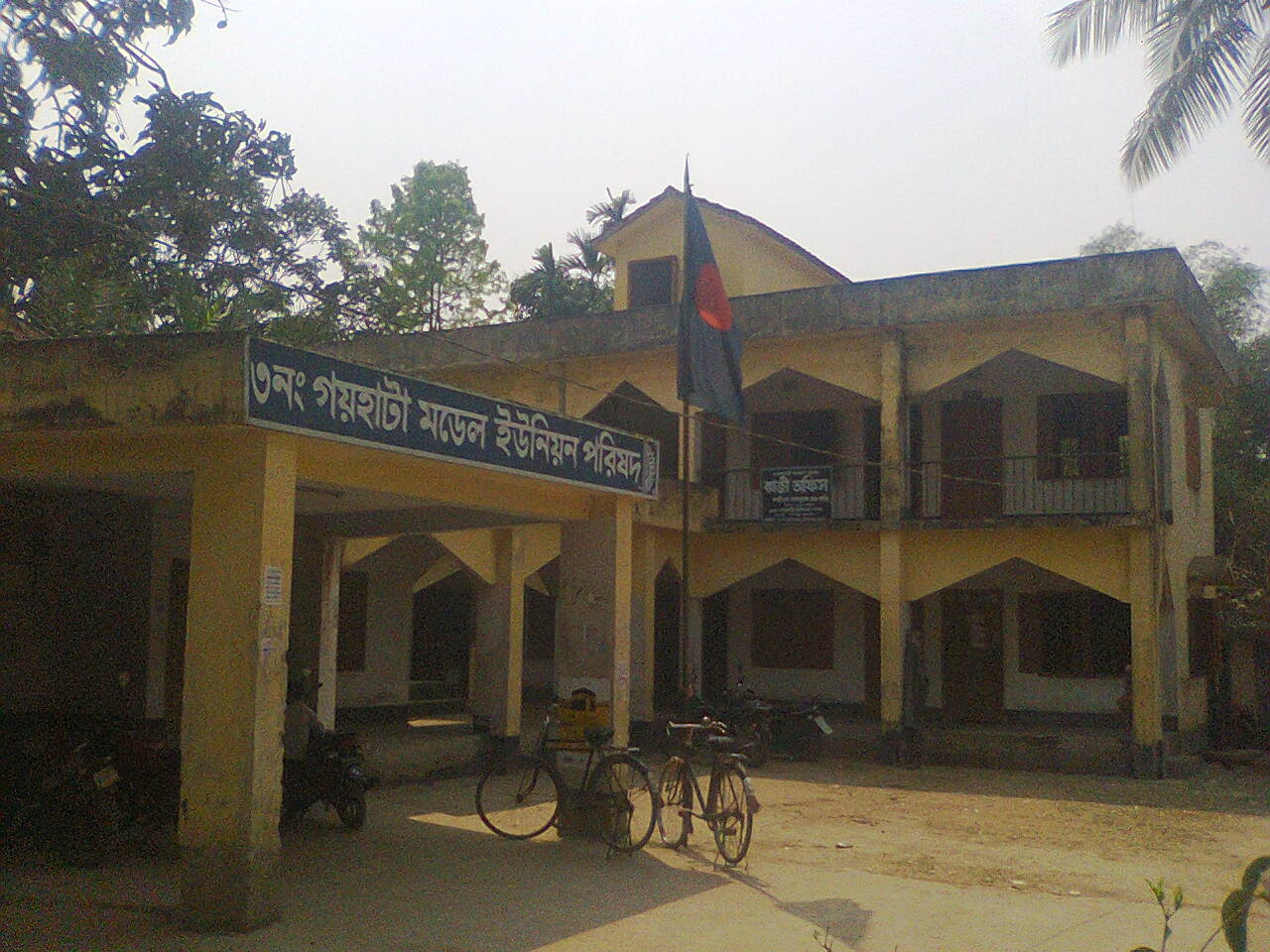
- Gayhata Union Parishad Complex

- Location of Gayhata Union in Bangladesh
- Coordinates: 24.0681°N 89.8394°E
- Country: Bangladesh
- Division: Dhaka Division
- District: Tangail District
- Upazila: Nagarpur Upazila
- Established on: 1984

Government
  - Type: Union Council
  - Chairman: Md Mostafizur Rahman Askor

Area
  - Total: 25.28 km^{2} (9.76 sq mi)
- Elevation: 14 m (46 ft)

Population (2011)
  - Total: 30,613
  - Density: 1,211/km^{2} (3,136/sq mi)
- Time zone: UTC+6 (BST)
- Postal code: 1936
- Website: gayhataup.tangail.gov.bd

Gayhata Union (Bengali: গয়হাটা ইউনিয়ন) is a union parishad of Nagarpur Upazila, Tangail District, Bangladesh. It is situated 3 km west of Nagarpur and 27 km south of Tangail city.

== Demographics ==
According to Population Census 2011 performed by Bangladesh Bureau of Statistics, The total population of Gayhata union is 30,613. There are 6,830 households in total.

== Education ==
The literacy rate of Gayhata Union is 48.1% (Male-50.4%, Female-45.9%).

== See also ==
- Union Councils of Tangail District
