= Dyenna Union =

Dyenna Union দাইন্যা ইউনিয়ন
- Location of Danya Union in Bangladesh
- Coordinates: 24.246198°N 89.852088°E
- Country: Bangladesh
- Division: Dhaka Division
- District: Tangail District
- Upazila: Tangail Sadar Upazila
- Established on: 1984

Government
  - Type: Union Council

Area
  - Total: 19.86 km^{2} (7.67 sq mi)
- Elevation: 14 m (46 ft)

Population (2011)
  - Total: 31,440
  - Density: 1,583/km^{2} (4,100/sq mi)
- Time zone: UTC+6 (BST)
- Postal code: 1904
- Website: dyennaup.tangail.gov.bd

Dyenna Union (Bengali: দাইন্যা ইউনিয়ন) is a union of Tangail Sadar Upazila, Tangail District, Bangladesh. It is situated 5 km west of Tangail, The District Headquarter.

== Demographics ==
Union Parishads in Tangail Sadar Upazila
U:union parishads, M: mahalla or neighbourhood
Owing to space constraints in the small map, the actual locations in a larger map may vary slightly

According to Population Census 2011 performed by Bangladesh Bureau of Statistics, The total population of Dyenna union is 31440. There are 7283 households in total.

== Education ==
The literacy rate of Dyenna Union is 47.7% (Male-52.5%, Female-43.2%).

== See also ==
- Union Councils of Tangail District
