= Gala Union =

Gala Union গালা ইউনিয়ন
- Location of Gala Union in Bangladesh
- Coordinates: 24.298934°N 89.896873°E
- Country: Bangladesh
- Division: Dhaka Division
- District: Tangail District
- Upazila: Tangail Sadar Upazila
- Established on: 1984

Government
  - Type: Union Council

Area
  - Total: 16.36 km^{2} (6.32 sq mi)
- Elevation: 14 m (46 ft)

Population (2011)
  - Total: 28,266
  - Density: 1,728/km^{2} (4,475/sq mi)
- Time zone: UTC+6 (BST)
- Postal code: 1900
- Website: galaup.tangail.gov.bd

Gala Union (Bengali: গালা ইউনিয়ন) is a union of Tangail Sadar Upazila, Tangail District, Bangladesh. It is situated 4 km north of Tangail, The District Headquarter.

== Demographics ==
According to Population Census 2011 performed by Bangladesh Bureau of Statistics, The total population of Gala union is 28266. There are 6484 households in total.

== Education ==
Union Parishads in Tangail Sadar Upazila
U:union parishads, M: mahalla or neighbourhood
Owing to space constraints in the small map, the actual locations in a larger map may vary slightly

The literacy rate of Gala Union is 52% (Male-56.6%, Female-47.3%).

== See also ==
- Union Councils of Tangail District
