= Mahamudnagar Union =

Mahamudnagar Union মাহমুদনগর ইউনিয়ন
- Location of Mahamudnagar Union in Bangladesh
- Coordinates: 24.276501°N 89.803815°E
- Country: Bangladesh
- Division: Dhaka Division
- District: Tangail District
- Upazila: Tangail Sadar Upazila
- Established: 2006

Government
  - Type: Union Council

Area
  - Total: 22.96 km^{2} (8.86 sq mi)
- Elevation: 14 m (46 ft)

Population (2011)
  - Total: 19,157
  - Density: 834/km^{2} (2,160/sq mi)
- Time zone: UTC+6 (BST)
- Postal code: 1930
- Website: Official Website of Mahamudnagar Union

Mahmudnagar Union (Bengali: মাহমুদনগর ইউনিয়ন) is a union of Tangail Sadar Upazila, Tangail District, Bangladesh. It is situated 14 kilometres (8.7 mi) west of Tangail, the district headquarters.There are 24 village in the union parishad.

== Demographics ==
Union Parishads in Tangail Sadar Upazila
U:union parishads, M: mahalla or neighbourhood
Owing to space constraints in the small map, the actual locations in a larger map may vary slightly

According to the 2011 Bangladesh census, Mahamudnagar Union had 4,175 households and a population of 19,157.

The literacy rate (age 7 and over) was 40.25% (male: 45.00%, female: 35.5%).

== Institutions ==
There are many institute in union parishad. on of them is....

1. Major Mahmudul Hasan High School, Makorkol.
2. Kores nagar Fazil Madrasha.
3. Balia Para High School.
4. Mahmudnagar Technical School.
5. Makorkol Govt. Primary School.
6. Bohuli Govt. Primary School.
7. Parbohuli Govt. Primary School.
8. Saharia Hasan Govt. Primary School.
9. Kukuria Govt. Primary School.
10. Saratoil Govt. Primary School.
11. Dopakandi Govt. Primary School.
12. Nondi boyra Govt. Primary School.
13. Baliapara Govt. Primary School.
14. Makorkol Hafijia Madrasa.
