= Elasin Union =

Elasin Union এলাসিন ইউনিয়ন
- Location of Elashin in Bangladesh
- Coordinates: 24.13998848°N 89.90083873°E
- Country: Bangladesh
- Division: Dhaka Division
- District: Tangail District
- Upazila: Delduar Upazila
- Established on: 1984

Government
  - Type: Union Council
  - Chairman: Md. Manik Ratan (Bangladesh Awami League)

Area
  - Total: 24.91 km^{2} (9.62 sq mi)
- Elevation: 16 m (52 ft)

Population (2011)
  - Total: 27,897
  - Density: 1,120/km^{2} (2,901/sq mi)
- Time zone: UTC+6 (BST)
- Postal code: 1913
- Website: Official Website of Elasin Union

Elasin Union (Bengali: এলাসিন ইউনিয়ন) is a union of Delduar Upazila, Tangail District, Bangladesh. It is situated at 12 km south of Tangail.

== Demographics ==
According to Population Census 2011 performed by Bangladesh Bureau of Statistics, The total population of Elasin union is 27897. There are 6476 households in total.

== Education ==
The literacy rate of Elasin Union is 59.8% (Male-63.5%, Female-56.4%).

== See also ==
- Union Councils of Tangail District
