= Fazilhati Union =

Fazilhati Union ফাজিলহাটি ইউনিয়ন
- Location of Fazilhati in Bangladesh
- Coordinates: 24.106231°N 89.9581683°E
- Country: Bangladesh
- Division: Dhaka Division
- District: Tangail District
- Upazila: Delduar Upazila
- Established on: 1984

Government
  - Type: Union Council
  - Chairman: Md Tofazzal Hossain (Bangladesh Nationalist Party)

Area
  - Total: 19.33 km^{2} (7.46 sq mi)
- Elevation: 12 m (39 ft)

Population (2011)
  - Total: 20,892
  - Density: 1,081/km^{2} (2,799/sq mi)
- Time zone: UTC+6 (BST)
- Postal code: 1915
- Website: fazilhatiup.tangail.gov.bd

Fazilhati Union (Bengali: ফাজিলহাটী ইউনিয়ন) is a union of Delduar Upazila, Tangail District, Bangladesh. It is situated at 20 km south of Tangail.

== Demographics ==
According to Population Census 2011 performed by Bangladesh Bureau of Statistics, The total population of Fazilhati union is 20892. There are 4991 households in total.

== Education ==
The literacy rate of Fazilhati Union is 48.3% (Male-50.6%, Female-46.2%).

== See also ==
- Union Councils of Tangail District
