= Katuli Union =

Katuli Union কাতুলী ইউনিয়ন
- Location of Katuli Union in Bangladesh
- Coordinates: 24.229115°N 89.841186°E
- Country: Bangladesh
- Division: Dhaka Division
- District: Tangail District
- Upazila: Tangail Sadar Upazila
- Established: 1984

Government
  - Type: Union Council

Area
  - Total: 26.92 km^{2} (10.39 sq mi)
- Elevation: 14 m (46 ft)

Population (2011)
  - Total: 29,811
  - Density: 1,107/km^{2} (2,868/sq mi)
- Time zone: UTC+6 (BST)
- Postal code: 1900
- Website: katuliup.tangail.gov.bd

Katuli Union (Bengali: কাতুলী ইউনিয়ন) is a union of Tangail Sadar Upazila, Tangail District, Bangladesh. It is situated 9 kilometres (5.6 mi) west of Tangail, the district headquarters.

== Demographics ==
Union Parishads in Tangail Sadar Upazila
U:union parishads, M: mahalla or neighbourhood
Owing to space constraints in the small map, the actual locations in a larger map may vary slightly

According to the 2011 Bangladesh census, Katuli Union had 6,433 households and a population of 29,811. The literacy rate (age 7 and over) was 33% (male: 37.1%, female: 29.2%).

== See also ==
- Union Councils of Tangail District
