= Gharinda Union =

Gharinda Union ঘারিন্দা ইউনিয়ন
- Location of Gharinda in Bangladesh
- Coordinates: 24°16′26.3712″N 89°56′41.0676″E
- Country: Bangladesh
- Division: Dhaka Division
- District: Tangail District
- Upazila: Tangail Sadar Upazila
- Established on: 1984

Government
  - Type: Union Council

Area
  - Total: 19.86 km^{2} (7.67 sq mi)
- Elevation: 14 m (46 ft)

Population (2011)
  - Total: 31,817
  - Density: 1,602/km^{2} (4,149/sq mi)
- Time zone: UTC+6 (BST)
- Website: gharindhaup.tangail.gov.bd

Gharinda Union (Bengali: ঘারিন্দা ইউনিয়ন) is a union of Tangail Sadar Upazila, Tangail District, Bangladesh. It is situated 4 kilometres (2.5 mi) east of Tangail city on the bank of Bongshai River.

== Demographics ==
According to the 2011 Bangladesh census, Gharinda Union had 7,496 households and a population of 31,817.

Union Parishads in Tangail Sadar Upazila
U:union parishads, M: mahalla or neighbourhood
Owing to space constraints in the small map, the actual locations in a larger map may vary slightly

The literacy rate (age 7 and over) was 45.1% (Male-48.4%, Female-42.1%).

== Transport ==
The railway station serving Tangail city is situated beside Gharinda Bazar in this union.

== See also ==
- Union Councils of Tangail District
