= Pakutia Union =

Pakutia Union পাকুটিয়া ইউনিয়ন
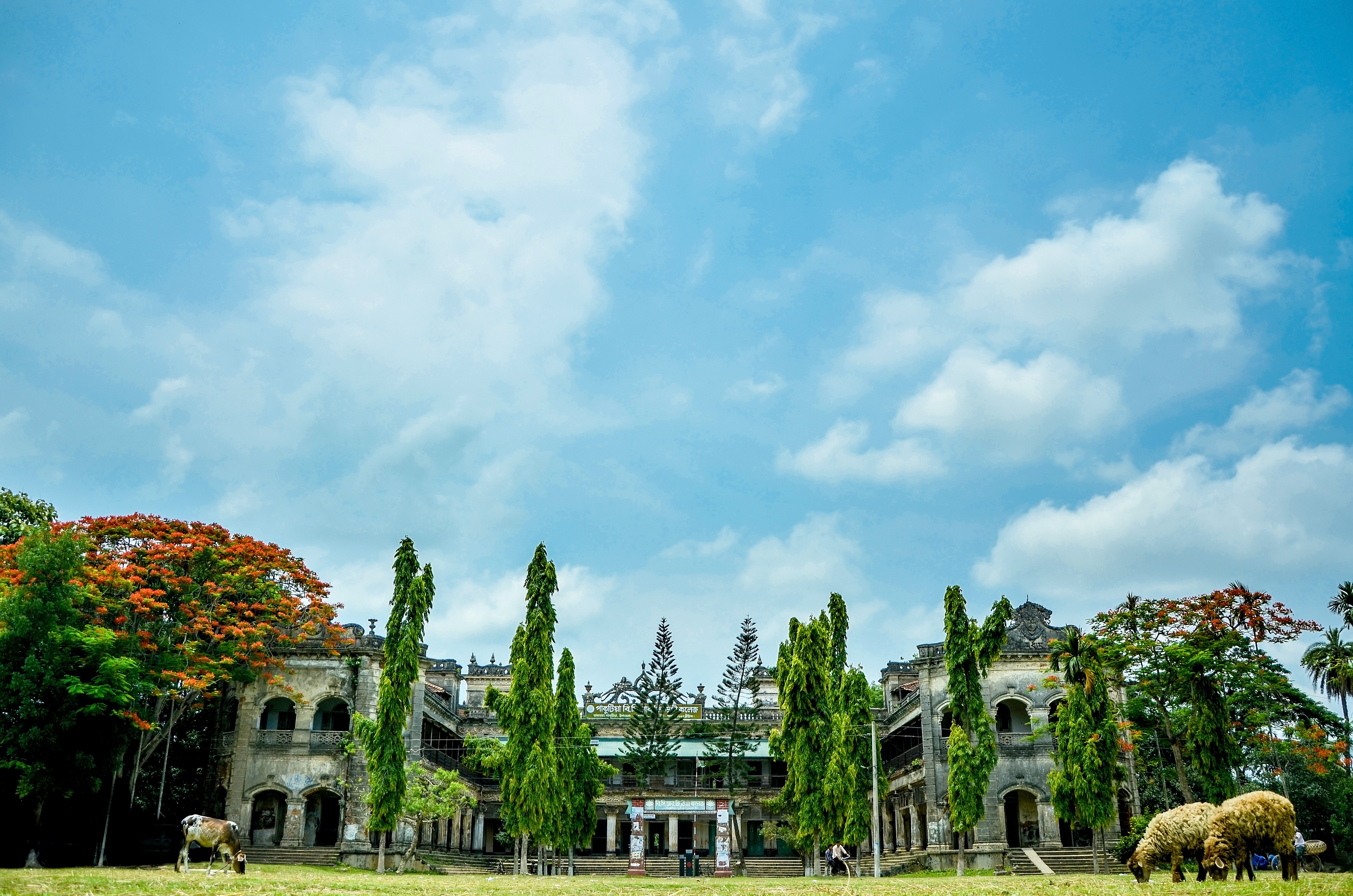
- Pakutia Rajbari

- Location of Pakutia in Bangladesh
- Coordinates: 24.020717864792935°N 89.98706370592117°E
- Country: Bangladesh
- Division: Dhaka Division
- District: Tangail District
- Upazila: Nagarpur Upazila
- Established on: 1984

Government
  - Type: Union Council
  - Chairman: Siddiqur Rahman(Independent)

Area
  - Total: 17.39 km^{2} (6.71 sq mi)
- Elevation: 15 m (49 ft)

Population (2011)
  - Total: 18,184
  - Density: 1,046/km^{2} (2,708/sq mi)
- Time zone: UTC+6 (BST)
- Postal code: 1936
- Website: Official Website of Pakutia Union

Pakutia Union (Bengali: পাকুটিয়া ইউনিয়ন) is a union of Nagarpur Upazila, Tangail District, Bangladesh. It is situated 40 km southeast of Tangail city and 64 km northwest of Dhaka, The capital of Bangladesh.

== Demographics ==
According to Population Census 2011 performed by Bangladesh Bureau of Statistics, The total population of Pakutia union is 18,184 .There are households 4,290 in total.

== See also ==
- Union Councils of Tangail District
