= Hugra Union =

Hugra Union হুগড়া ইউনিয়ন
- Location of Hugra Union in Bangladesh
- Coordinates: 24.288866°N 89.831975°E
- Country: Bangladesh
- Division: Dhaka Division
- District: Tangail District
- Upazila: Tangail Sadar Upazila
- Established: 1984

Government
  - Type: Union Council

Area
  - Total: 34.13 km^{2} (13.18 sq mi)
- Elevation: 14 m (46 ft)

Population (2011)
  - Total: 34,490
  - Density: 1,011/km^{2} (2,620/sq mi)
- Time zone: UTC+6 (BST)
- Postal code: 1900
- Website: Official Website of Hugra Union

Hugra Union (Bengali: হুগড়া ইউনিয়ন) is a union of Tangail Sadar Upazila, Tangail District, Bangladesh. It is 17 kilometres (11 mi) west of Tangail, the district headquarters. As of 2025 Noor A Alam Tuhin was chairman

Union Parishads in Tangail Sadar Upazila
U:union parishads, M: mahalla or neighbourhood
Owing to space constraints in the small map, the actual locations in a larger map may vary slightly

== Demographics ==
According to the 2011 Bangladesh census, Hugra Union had 7,073 households and a population of 34,490. The literacy rate (age 7 and over) was 37% (male: 42.2%, female: 31.8%).

== See also ==
- Union Councils of Tangail District
