= Dubail Union =

Dubail Union ডুবাইল ইউনিয়ন
- Location of Gharinda in Bangladesh
- Coordinates: 24.16173152°N 89.97565627°E
- Country: Bangladesh
- Division: Dhaka Division
- District: Tangail District
- Upazila: Delduar Upazila
- Established on: 1984

Government
  - Type: Union Council
  - Chairman: Md. Elias Miah (Bangladesh Awami League)

Area
  - Total: 19.5 km^{2} (7.5 sq mi)
- Elevation: 15 m (49 ft)

Population (2011)
  - Total: 24,639
  - Density: 1,260/km^{2} (3,270/sq mi)
- Time zone: UTC+6 (BST)
- Postal code: 1910
- Website: Official Website of Dubail Union

Dubail Union (Bengali: ডুবাইল ইউনিয়ন) is a union of Delduar Upazila, Tangail District, Bangladesh. It is situated at 15 km southeast of Tangail.

== Demographics ==
According to Population Census 2011 performed by Bangladesh Bureau of Statistics, The total population of Dubail union is 24,639. There are 5,688 households in total.

== Education ==
The literacy rate of Dubail Union is 54.4% (Male-56.7%, Female-52.4%).

== See also ==
- Union Councils of Tangail District
