= Lauhati Union =

Lauhati Union লাউহাটি ইউনিয়ন
- Location of Lauhati in Bangladesh
- Coordinates: 24.0773141°N 89.9502008°E
- Country: Bangladesh
- Division: Dhaka Division
- District: Tangail District
- Upazila: Delduar Upazila
- Established on: 1984

Government
  - Type: Union Council
  - Chairman: Md Rafiqul Islam Khan (Bangladesh Nationalist Party)

Area
  - Total: 25.54 km^{2} (9.86 sq mi)
- Elevation: 15 m (49 ft)

Population (2011)
  - Total: 23,959
  - Density: 938/km^{2} (2,430/sq mi)
- Time zone: UTC+6 (BST)
- Postal code: 1915
- Website: lauhatiup.tangail.gov.bd

Lauhati Union (Bengali: লাউহাটি ইউনিয়ন) is a union of Delduar Upazila, Tangail District, Bangladesh. It is situated at 23 km south of Tangail.

== Demographics ==
According to Population Census 2011 performed by Bangladesh Bureau of Statistics, The total population of Lauhati union is 23959. There are 5725 households in total.

== Education ==
The literacy rate of Lauhati Union is 43.4% (Male-47.1%, Female-40.1%).

== See also ==
- Union Councils of Tangail District
