= Deoli Union =

Deoli Union দেউলী ইউনিয়ন
- Location of Deoli in Bangladesh
- Coordinates: 24.16507929°N 89.89189625°E
- Country: Bangladesh
- Division: Dhaka Division
- District: Tangail District
- Upazila: Delduar Upazila
- Established on: 1984

Government
  - Type: Union Council
  - Chairman: Dewan Tahmina Haque (Bangladesh Awami League)

Area
  - Total: 16.93 km^{2} (6.54 sq mi)
- Elevation: 13 m (43 ft)

Population (2011)
  - Total: 16,718
  - Density: 987.5/km^{2} (2,558/sq mi)
- Time zone: UTC+6 (BST)
- Postal code: 1914
- Website: deoliup.tangail.gov.bd

Deoli Union (Bengali: দেউলী ইউনিয়ন) is a union parishad under Delduar Upazila of Tangail District in the Dhaka Division of central Bangladesh. It is situated 11 kilometres (6.8 mi) south of Tangail.

== Demographics ==
According to Population Census 2011 performed by Bangladesh Bureau of Statistics, The total population of Deoli union is 16718. There are 3944 households in total.

== Education ==
The literacy rate of Deoli Union is 50.2% (Male-52.6%, Female-48%).

== See also ==
- Union Councils of Tangail District
