= Mogra Union =

Mogra Union মগড়া ইউনিয়ন
- Location of Mogra Union in Bangladesh
- Coordinates: 24.336248°N 89.883544°E
- Country: Bangladesh
- Division: Dhaka Division
- District: Tangail District
- Upazila: Tangail Sadar Upazila
- Established on: 1984

Government
  - Type: Union Council
  - Chairman: Ajahar Ali

Area
  - Total: 23.13 km^{2} (8.93 sq mi)
- Elevation: 14 m (46 ft)

Population (2011)
  - Total: 32,109
  - Density: 1,388/km^{2} (3,595/sq mi)
- Time zone: UTC+6 (BST)
- Postal code: 1900
- Website: Official Website of Mogra Union

Mogra Union (Bengali: মগড়া ইউনিয়ন) is a union of Tangail Sadar Upazila, Tangail District, Bangladesh. It is situated 16 km north of Tangail, The District Headquarter.

== Demographics ==
Union Parishads in Tangail Sadar Upazila
U:union parishads, M: mahalla or neighbourhood
Owing to space constraints in the small map, the actual locations in a larger map may vary slightly

Mr. Tanvir Hossain, Son of Neshan Ali, vill: Senergagor jan, Post chowdhury Malancho, Tangail Sadar. He is working under Ministry of Industries as Management adviser According to Population Census 2011 performed by Bangladesh Bureau of Statistics, The total population of Mogra union is 32109. There are 5614 households in total.

== Education ==
The literacy rate of Mogra Union is 43.6% (Male-48.5%, Female-39%).

== See also ==
- Union Councils of Tangail District
