= Baghil Union =

Baghil Union বাঘিল ইউনিয়ন
- Location of Baghil Union in Bangladesh
- Coordinates: 24.278643°N 89.867740°E
- Country: Bangladesh
- Division: Dhaka Division
- District: Tangail District
- Upazila: Tangail Sadar Upazila
- Established: 1984

Government
  - Type: Union council

Area
  - Total: 21.01 km^{2} (8.11 sq mi)
- Elevation: 14 m (46 ft)

Population (2011)
  - Total: 30,437
  - Density: 1,449/km^{2} (3,752/sq mi)
- Time zone: UTC+6 (BST)
- Postal code: 1900
- Website: baghilup.tangail.gov.bd

Baghil Union (Bengali: বাঘিল ইউনিয়ন) is a union parishad of Tangail Sadar Upazila, Tangail District, Bangladesh. It is situated 8 km northwest of Tangail, the district headquarters.

== Demographics ==
Union Parishads in Tangail Sadar Upazila
U:union parishads, M: mahalla or neighbourhood
Owing to space constraints in the small map, the actual locations in a larger map may vary slightly

According to Population Census 2011 performed by Bangladesh Bureau of Statistics, The total population of Baghil union is 30437. There are 6858 households in total.,

Bangladesh

== Education ==
The literacy rate of Baghil Union is 41% (Male-45.7%, Female-36.5%).

== See also ==
- Union Councils of Tangail District
