= Kakua =

Kakua may be,

- Kakua language
- Kakua Chiefdom
- Kakua Union
