= Silimpur Union =

Silimpur Union ছিলিমপুর ইউনিয়ন
- Location of Silimpur Union in Bangladesh
- Coordinates: 24.167123°N 89.900133°E
- Country: Bangladesh
- Division: Dhaka Division
- District: Tangail District
- Upazila: Tangail Sadar Upazila
- Established on: 1984

Government
  - Type: Union Council

Area
  - Total: 16.62 km^{2} (6.42 sq mi)
- Elevation: 14 m (46 ft)

Population (2011)
  - Total: 20,794
  - Density: 1,251/km^{2} (3,240/sq mi)
- Time zone: UTC+6 (BST)
- Postal code: 1904
- Website: Official Website of Silimpur Union

Silimpur Union (Bengali: ছিলিমপুর ইউনিয়ন) is a union of Tangail Sadar Upazila, Tangail District, Bangladesh. It is situated 10 km south of Tangail, The District Headquarter.

== Demographics ==
Union Parishads in Tangail Sadar Upazila
U:union parishads, M: mahalla or neighbourhood
Owing to space constraints in the small map, the actual locations in a larger map may vary slightly

According to Population Census 2011 performed by Bangladesh Bureau of Statistics, The total population of Silimpur union is 20794. There are 4837 households in total.

== Education ==
The literacy rate of Silimpur Union is 46.4% (Male-50.3%, Female-42.9%).

== See also ==
- Union Councils of Tangail District
