= Delduar Union =

Delduar Union দেলদুয়ার ইউনিয়ন
- Location of Delduar in Bangladesh
- Coordinates: 24.16188815°N 89.96732533°E
- Country: Bangladesh
- Division: Dhaka Division
- District: Tangail District
- Upazila: Delduar Upazila
- Established on: 1984

Government
  - Type: Union Council
  - Chairman: Masuduzzaman khan

Area
  - Total: 24.11 km^{2} (9.31 sq mi)
- Elevation: 15 m (49 ft)

Population (2011)
  - Total: 30,942
  - Density: 1,283/km^{2} (3,324/sq mi)
- Time zone: UTC+6 (BST)
- Postal code: 1910
- Website: http://delduarup.tangail.gov.bd/

Delduar Union (Bengali: দেলদুয়ার ইউনিয়ন) is a union of Delduar Upazila, Tangail District, Bangladesh. It is situated at 12 km south of Tangail. The village called Nalua is one of the most popular place in Delduar Union.

== Demographics ==
According to Population Census 2011 performed by Bangladesh Bureau of Statistics, The total population of Delduar union is 30,942. There are 7390 households in total.

== Education ==
The literacy rate of Delduar Union is 51% (Male-53.3%, Female-48.9%).

== See also ==
- Union Councils of Tangail District
