= Atia Union =

Atia Union আটিয়া ইউনিয়ন
- Location of Atia in Bangladesh
- Coordinates: 24.1840851°N 89.9114148°E
- Country: Bangladesh
- Division: Dhaka Division
- District: Tangail District
- Upazila: Delduar Upazila
- Established on: 1984

Government
  - Type: Union Council
  - Chairman: Sajjad Hosen Azad

Area
  - Total: 23.08 km^{2} (8.91 sq mi)
- Elevation: 16 m (52 ft)

Population (2011)
  - Total: 30,428
  - Density: 1,318/km^{2} (3,415/sq mi)
- Time zone: UTC+6 (BST)
- Postal code: 1914
- Website: atiaup.tangail.gov.bd

Atia Union (Bengali: আটিয়া ইউনিয়ন) is a union of Delduar Upazila, Tangail District, Bangladesh. It is situated at 9 km south of Tangail.

== Demographics ==
According to Population Census 2011 performed by Bangladesh Bureau of Statistics, The total population of Atia union is 30428. There are 6915 households in total.

== Education ==
The literacy rate of Atia Union is 51.8% (Male-56.7%, Female-46.9%).

== See also ==
- Union Councils of Tangail District
