= Salimabad Union =

Salimabad Union সলিমাবাদ ইউনিয়ন
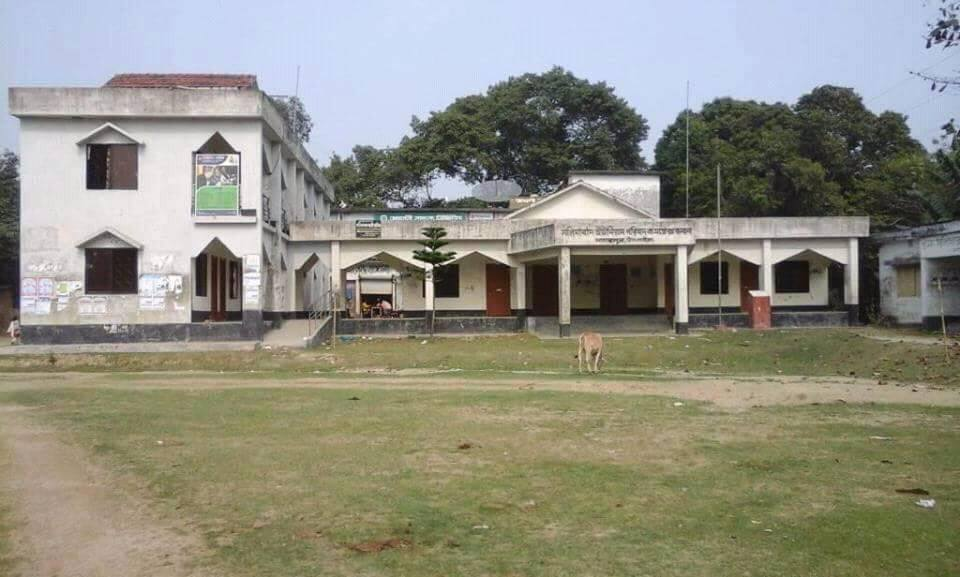
- Salimabad Union Parishad

- Location of Salimabad in Bangladesh
- Coordinates: 24°2′58.8694″N 89°48′41.5908″E
- Country: Bangladesh
- Division: Dhaka Division
- District: Tangail District
- Upazila: Nagarpur Upazila
- Established: 1984

Government
  - Type: Union Council

Area
  - Total: 17 km^{2} (6.6 sq mi)
- Elevation: 12 m (39 ft)

Population (2011)
  - Total: 21,674
  - Density: 1,300/km^{2} (3,300/sq mi)
- Time zone: UTC+6 (BST)
- Postal code: 1938
- Website: salimabadup.tangail.gov.bd

Salimabad Union is a union parishad of Nagarpur Upazila, Tangail District, Bangladesh. It is situated 6 km west of Nagarpur Upazila headquarters on the bank of the Jamuna River.

== Population ==
According to Population Census 2011 performed by Bangladesh Bureau of Statistics, The total population of Salimabad union is 21,674. There are 5042 households in total. Largest village in terms of population and area is Salimabad.

Village	Total households	Population
Salimabad	1573	6385
Tebaria	987	4209
Char Ghunipara	684	3351
Tarfram Ghunipara	1113	4702
Paiksha	342	1521
Maijhail	343	1506

== Administration ==
The centre of the union is Salimabad Bazar. The Chairman of Salimabad Union Parishad is Advocate Daudul Islam from Bangladesh Awami league.The union parishad complex is situated in Salimabad Bazar. There are 6 villages in this union. These are-

- Salimabad
- Tarfram Ghunipara
- Tebaria
- Char Ghunipara
- Paiksha
- Maijhail

== Education ==
The literacy rate of Salimabad Union is 50.4% (Male-51.6%, Female-49.4%).

There are several government financed primary schools in Salimabad. These are-

- Salimabad Govt. Primary school
- Salimabad Purbopara Govt. Primary school
- Salimabad uttarpara government primary school
- Tebaria government primary school
- Ghunipara government primary school
- Khasghunipara government primary school
- Paiksha-Maijhail government primary school

There are few high schools. These are-

- Salimabad union govt girls' high school
- Salimabad-Tebaria Islamia high school
- Ghunipara high school
- Freedom fighter Anwar Khan high school

== See also ==
- Nagarpur Upazila
- Tangail
