= Atia Mosque =

Mosque in Tangail, Bangladesh

- আতিয়া মসজিদ
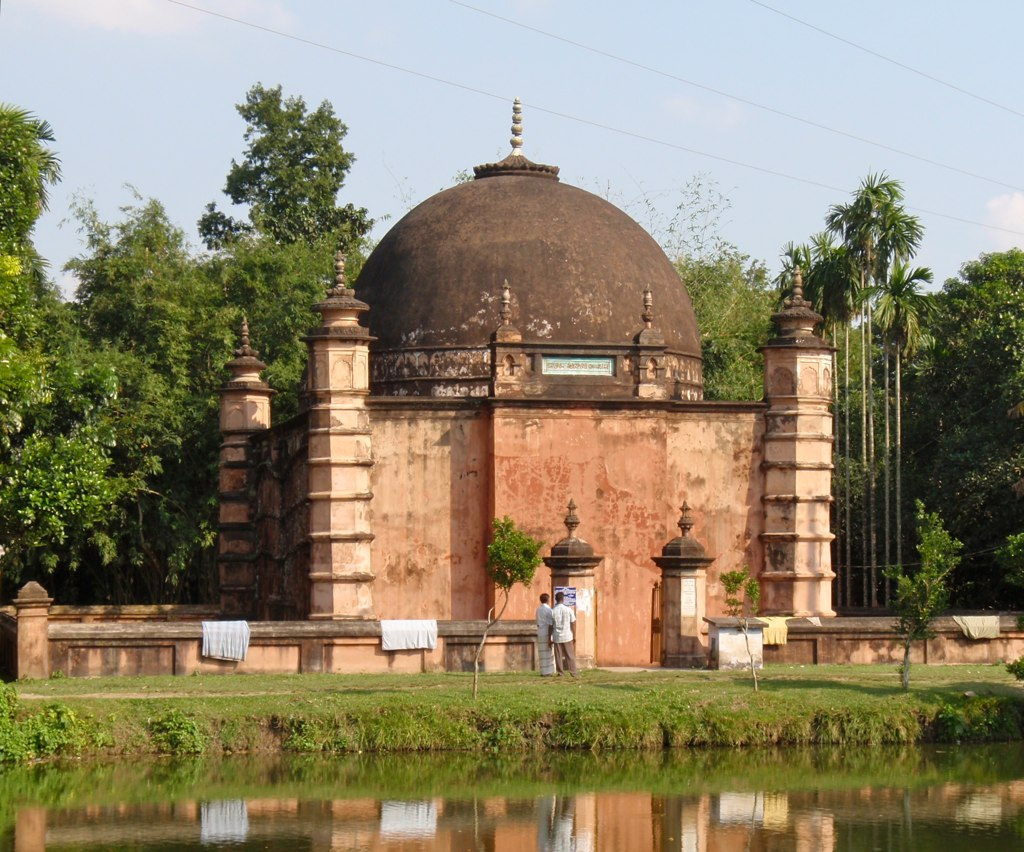

- Location within Bangladesh

Religion
- Affiliation: Islam
- Status: active

Location
- Location: Atia, Delduar, Tangail, Bangladesh
- Coordinates: 24°11′2.476″N 89°54′41.094″E

Architecture
- Type: Mosque
- Style: Bengali, Islamic, Mughal
- Founder: Sayed Khan Panni
- Established: 1609

Specifications
- Length: 12.19m
- Width: 18.29m
- Dome: 4
- Minaret: 4
- Site area: 223.9m^{2}
- Inscriptions: 4
- Materials: Brick, terracotta

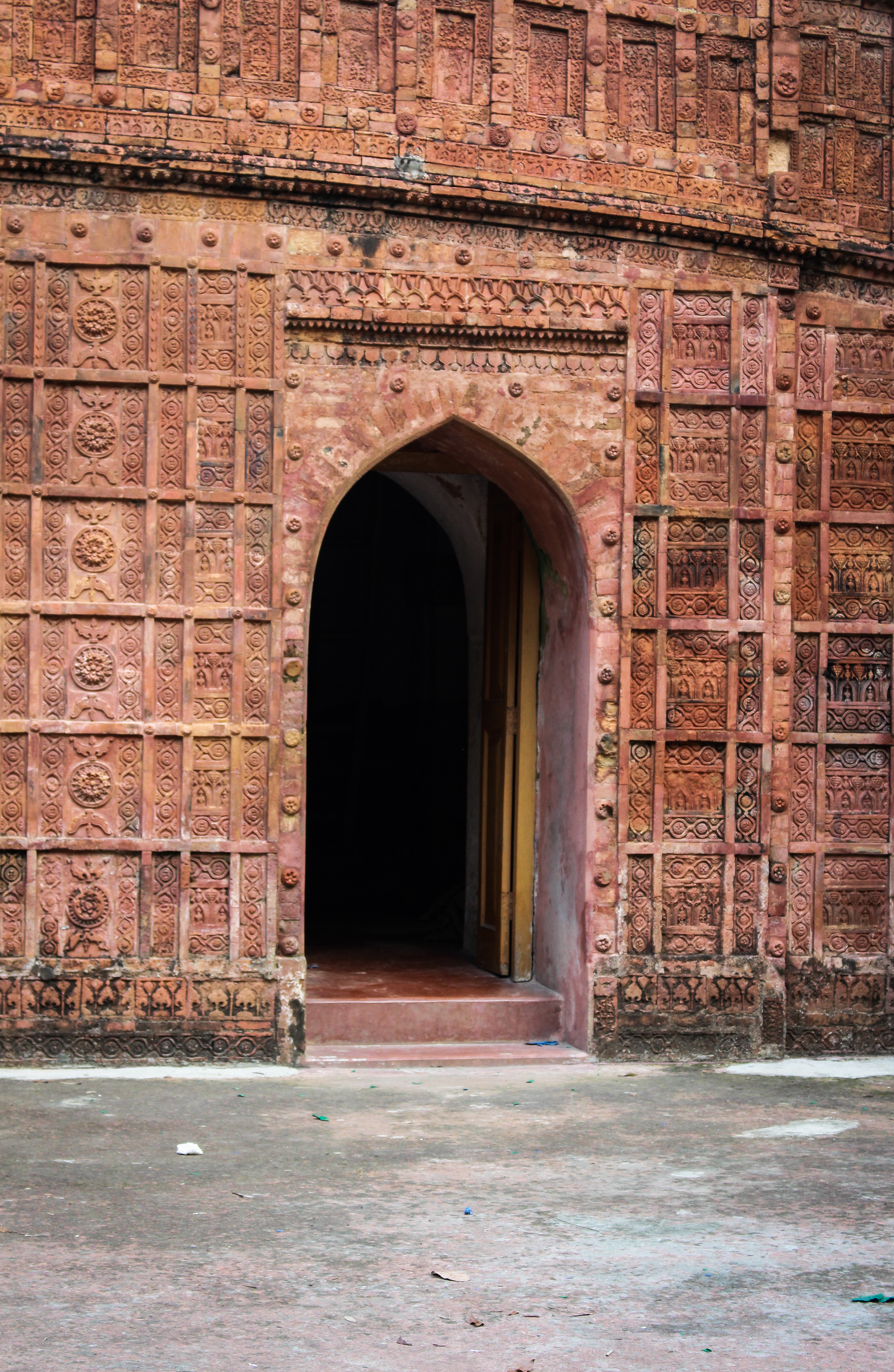
Entrance to the mosque

Atia Mosque (Bengali: আতিয়া মসজিদ, Arabic: مسجد عطية) is a four-domed mosque located in Tangail District, Bangladesh. It was built in the 17th century during the Mughal period and lies on the eastern banks of the Louhajang River. The country's Department of Archaeology has designated it as a protected monument.

== Location ==
The mosque, which is located about six kilometres (3.7 mi) south from the city of Tangail, is in the village of Atia in Delduar Upazila.

== History ==
According to one of the inscriptions discovered in the mosque (which is now preserved in the Bangladesh National Museum), it was constructed between 1610 and 1611 CE. This was during the reign of Mughal emperor Jahangir, when the Emperor gifted the Pargana of Atia to Sayeed Khan Panni, the son of Bayazid Khan Panni of the Karatia Zamindari. Panni instructed for the mosque to be built and it was built in honour of Shahan Shah Baba Adam Kashmiri, a prominent Sufi saint of Atia who died in 1507 CE and whose mazar (mausoleum) is in close proximity to the mosque. It is said that the finest of masons and builders were hired by Panni for the job.

The mosque suffered damage during an earthquake in the early 19th century. In 1837, a female merchant from Delhi by the name of Rowshun Khatoon Chowdhurani repaired the mosque. It was repaired for another time in 1909 by Zamindar Abu Ahmad Ghuznavi Khan of Delduar with the co-operation of other local Zamindars namely Wajed Ali Khan Panni of Karatia.

== Description ==
The mosque combines elements of Mughal architecture with that of the common architecture during the Bengal Sultanate period. Panni also had a large water tank built in the western part of the compound, most likely for ablutionary purposes.

The exterior of this small mosque measures 18.29m x 12.19m and its walls are 2.23m wide. The rectangular mosque consists of a large domed and square-shaped prayer hall attached to a veranda to its east side, that has three smaller domes on top of it. There are three arched entrances to the east, the middle one slightly higher than the two side entrances.

The arches of the Atiya Mosque are quadrangular in style. The main prayer room can be entered through three entrances from the veranda. In addition, there are two side entrances each to the prayer hall and veranda. There are three ornate mihrabs on the wall of the qibla. The four corners of the mosque have octagonal towers divided into parallel moulding designs. The side towers, ornamented by several levels of raised design, rise to the top of the roof cornice. At the end of all the towers are small domes with ornaments and decorated with flat fluted cupolas with lotus and kalasa finials.

== Legacy ==
In popular culture, the Atia Mosque is dubbed the 10 Taka Mosque as the Government of Bangladesh issued a ৳10 banknote from 3 August 1978 which had an image of the mosque in its obverse.

On 6 February 2010, the 400th anniversary of the mosque was commemorated in nearby Shahan Shah High School and some of the people present included Mohammad Abdur Razzaque, Khandaker Abdul Baten and Fazlur Rahman Faruque. The anniversary also celebrated the publication of Atianama, a book on the history of the mosque.

== See also ==
- Islam in Bangladesh
- List of mosques in Bangladesh
