= Porabari Union =

Porabari Union পোড়াবাড়ী ইউনিয়ন
- Location of Porabari in Bangladesh
- Coordinates: 24.213612°N 89.855357°E
- Country: Bangladesh
- Division: Dhaka Division
- District: Tangail District
- Upazila: Tangail Sadar Upazila
- Established on: 1984

Government
  - Type: Union Council

Area
  - Total: 13.78 km^{2} (5.32 sq mi)
- Elevation: 14 m (46 ft)

Population (2011)
  - Total: 21,622
  - Density: 1,569/km^{2} (4,064/sq mi)
- Time zone: UTC+6 (BST)
- Postal code: 1904
- Website: porabariup.tangail.gov.bd

Porabari Union (Bengali: পোড়াবাড়ী ইউনিয়ন) is a union of Tangail Sadar Upazila, Tangail District, Bangladesh.

== Etymology ==
Porabari means burnt house in Bengali. The name relates to an incident where the house of a sweetmaker was burnt to the ground.

== History ==
In 1608, Porabari was developed as a river port. Large merchant ships, launches and steamers used to visit Porabari. Porabari Bazar was a busy business centre.

In the late 1800s, Braja Gopal Niyogi, then a resident of Berabuchina, located nearby, had opened a river steamer service from Porabari to Goalundo Ghat, which had been linked to Kolkata by train service. It was a thriving business, but one day the steamer sank in the Padma River.

== Geography ==
Union Parishads in Tangail Sadar Upazila
U:union parishads, M: mahalla or neighbourhood
Owing to space constraints in the small map, the actual locations in a larger map may vary slightly

Porabari Union lies on the flood plains of the Jamuna River. The Dhaleshwari River, first an old channel of the Ganges and then of the Brahmaputra used to flow by the Salimabad Channel and then at last by Porabari Channel.

== Demographics ==
According to Population Census 2011 performed by Bangladesh Bureau of Statistics, The total population of Porabari union is 21,622. There are 4,897 households in total.

== Porabarir chamcham ==
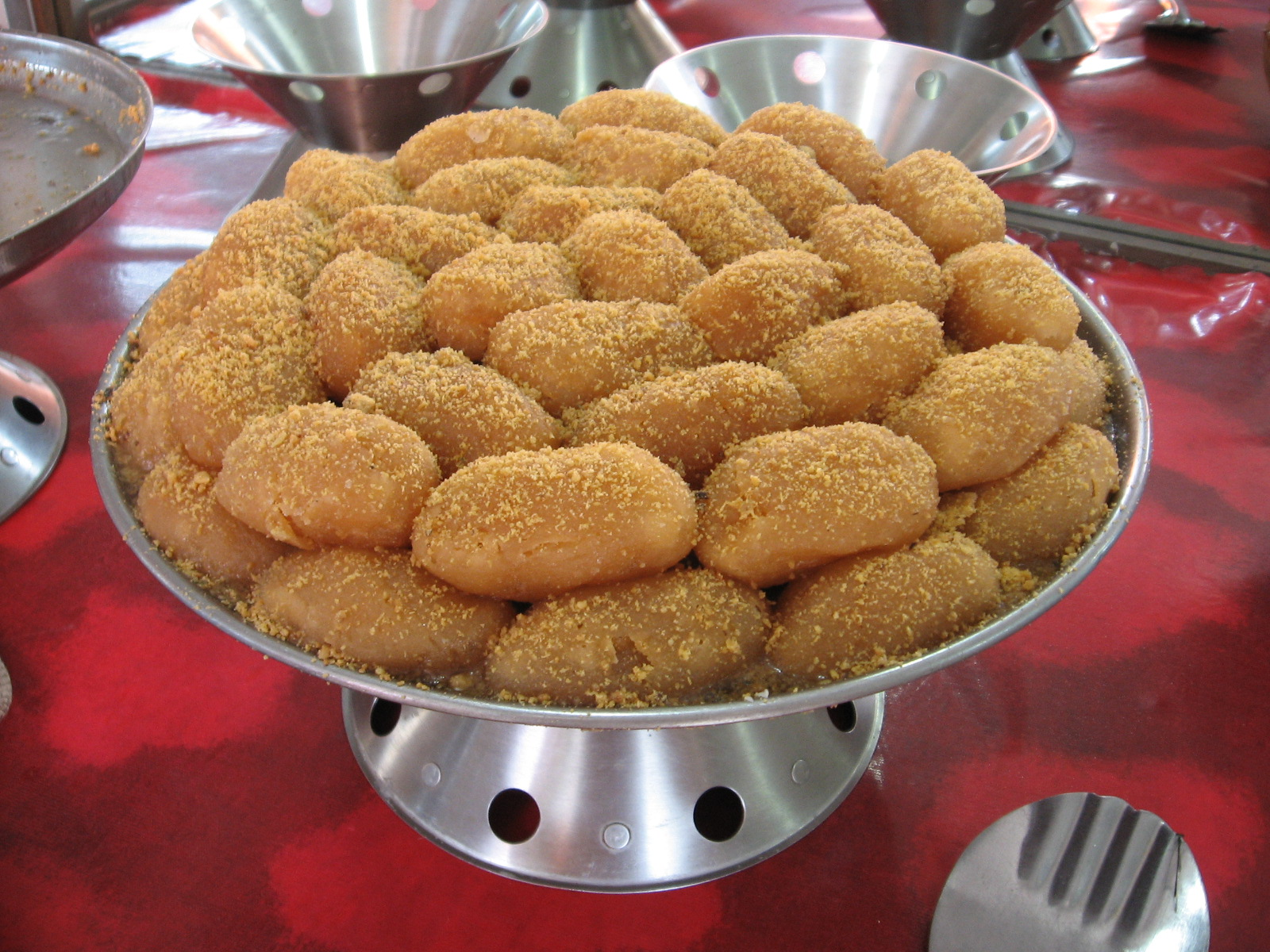
Porabarir chamcham

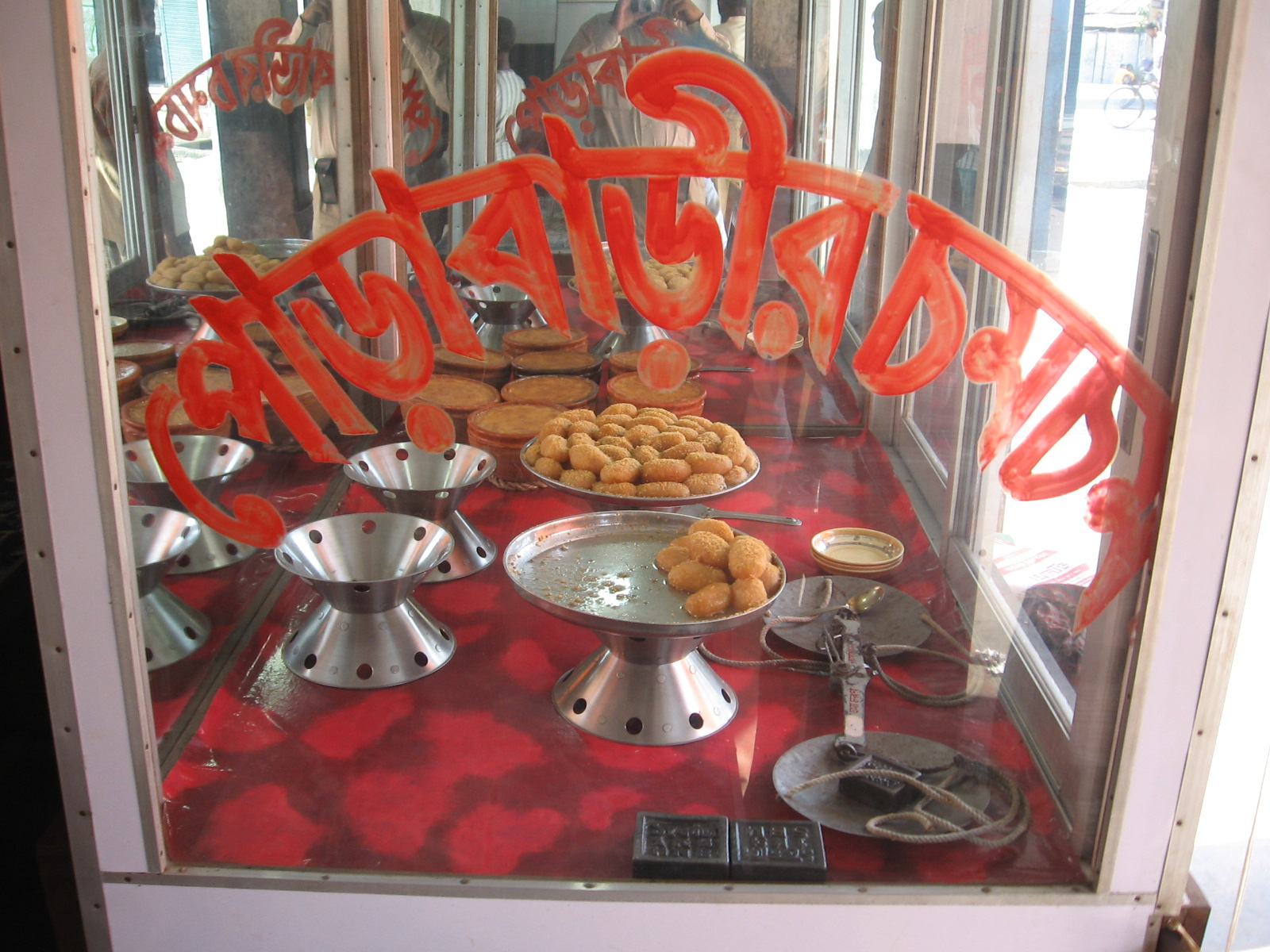
Tangail bus stand shop window

Chamcham, a milk-based sweetmeat/ sweet dessert, was first made by Dashrath Gaur who came from Assam and settled in Porabari. In the 18th century continued to produce and sell chamcham. Porabari chamcham was officially recognized as a GI product on April 25, 2024. Porabari is at a distance of six kilometrs from Tangail.

Pure cow’s milk mixed with the sweet water of the river is used to make chhana, a form of cheese curds, which is turned into the delicious chamcham.

There are thirteen sweat meat producing units spread across Porabari Bazar, Charabari Bazar and Santosh where chamcham and other sweets are produced. The Tangail area has around fifty shops where the famous chamcham is available.

== See also ==
- Union Councils of Tangail District
- Chomchom
