= Kakua Union =

Kakua Union কাকুয়া ইউনিয়ন
- Location of Kakua Union in Bangladesh
- Coordinates: 24°19′16″N 89°50′00″E
- Country: Bangladesh
- Division: Dhaka Division
- District: Tangail District
- Upazila: Tangail Sadar Upazila
- Established: 1984

Government
  - Type: Union Council

Area
  - Total: 35.25 km^{2} (13.61 sq mi)
- Elevation: 14 m (46 ft)

Population (2011)
  - Total: 27,260
  - Density: 773.3/km^{2} (2,003/sq mi)
- Time zone: UTC+6 (BST)
- Postal code: 1900
- Website: Official Website of Kakua Union

Kakua Union (Bengali: কাকুয়া ইউনিয়ন) is a union of Tangail Sadar Upazila, Tangail District, Bangladesh. It is situated 12 kilometres (7.5 mi) northwest of Tangail, the district headquarters.

== Demographics ==
Union Parishads in Tangail Sadar Upazila
U:union parishads, M: mahalla or neighbourhood
Owing to space constraints in the small map, the actual locations in a larger map may vary slightly

According to the 2011 Bangladesh census, Kakua Union had 5,614 households and a population of 27,260. The literacy rate (age 7 and over) was 31.8% (male: 35.4%, female: 28%).

== See also ==
- Union Councils of Tangail District
