= Pathrail Union =

Pathrail Union পাথরাইল ইউনিয়ন
- Location of Pathrail in Bangladesh
- Coordinates: 24.2046096°N 89.9371022°E
- Country: Bangladesh
- Division: Dhaka Division
- District: Tangail District
- Upazila: Delduar Upazila
- Established on: 1984

Government
  - Type: Union Council
  - Chairman: Ram Proshad Sarkar

Area
  - Total: 18.97 km^{2} (7.32 sq mi)
- Elevation: 16 m (52 ft)

Population (2011)
  - Total: 31,803
  - Density: 1,676/km^{2} (4,342/sq mi)
- Time zone: UTC+6 (BST)
- Postal code: 1912
- Website: pathrailup.tangail.gov.bd

Pathrail Union (Bengali: পাথরাইল ইউনিয়ন) is a union parishad of Delduar Upazila, Tangail District, Bangladesh. It is situated at 6 km south of Tangail.

== Demographics ==
According to Population Census 2011 performed by Bangladesh Bureau of Statistics, The total population of Pathrail union is 31803. There are 7098 households in total.

== Education ==
The literacy rate of Pathrail Union is 50.5% (Male-54.8%, Female-46%).

== See also ==
- Union Councils of Tangail District
