= Delduar Upazila =

Delduar দেলদুয়ার
- Upazila
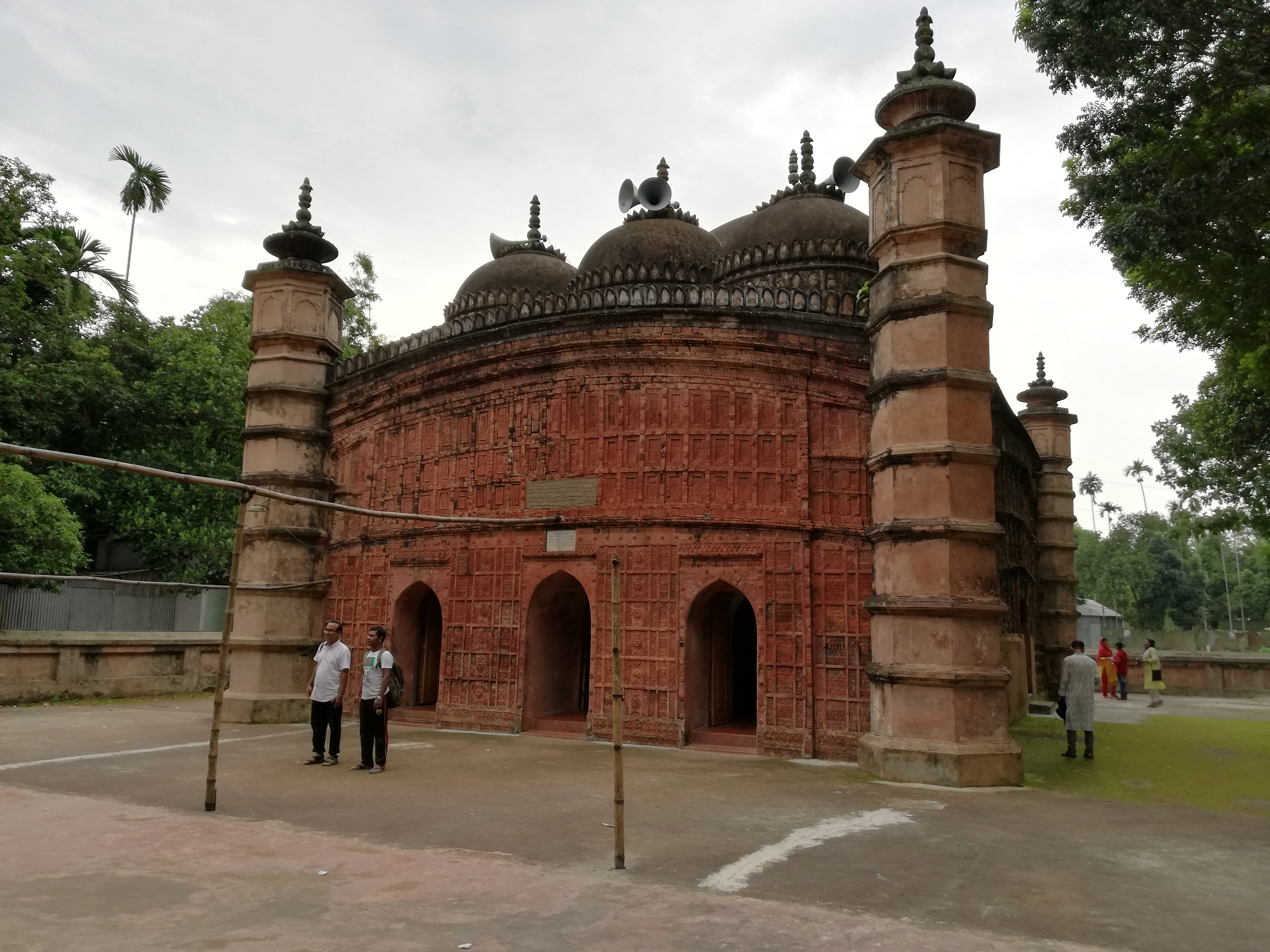
- Atia Mosque

- Coordinates: 24°8.5′N 89°58′E
- Country: Bangladesh
- Division: Dhaka
- District: Tangail

Government
  - Upazila Chairman: Not Applicable Now

Area
  - Total: 184.54 km^{2} (71.25 sq mi)

Population (2022)
  - Total: 218,745
  - Density: 1,185.4/km^{2} (3,070.0/sq mi)
- Time zone: UTC+6 (BST)
- Postal code: 1910
- Website: delduar.tangail.gov.bd

Delduar Upazila mauza geocode map

Delduar (Bengali: দেলদুয়ার) is an upazila of Tangail District in the Division of Dhaka, Bangladesh.

== Geography ==
Delduar is located at 24.1417°N 89.9667°E. It has 48,227 households and total area 184.54 km^{2}.

== Demographics ==
Religions in Delduar Upazila (2022)
Religion	Percent
Islam	89.29%
Hinduism	10.70%
Other or not stated	0.01%

According to the 2022 Bangladeshi census, Delduar Upazila had 56,971 households and a population of 218,745. 8.12% of the population were under 5 years of age. Delduar had a literacy rate (age 7 and over) of 71.75%: 74.64% for males and 69.27% for females, and a sex ratio of 88.15 males for every 100 females. 30,267 (13.84%) lived in urban areas.

According to the 2011 Census of Bangladesh, Delduar Upazila had 48,227 households and a population of 207,278. 41,018 (19.79%) were under 10 years of age. Delduar had a literacy rate (age 7 and over) of 51.57%, compared to the national average of 51.8%, and a sex ratio of 1060 females per 1000 males. 14,102 (6.80%) lived in urban areas.

== Administration ==
Delduar Upazila is divided into eight union parishads: Atia, Delduar, Deoli, Dubail, Elashin, Fazilhati, Lauhati, and Pathrail. The union parishads are subdivided into 123 mauzas and 162 villages.

== See also ==
- Atia Mosque
- Upazilas of Bangladesh
- Districts of Bangladesh
- Divisions of Bangladesh
