= Nagarpur Upazila =

Nagarpur নাগরপুর
- Upazila
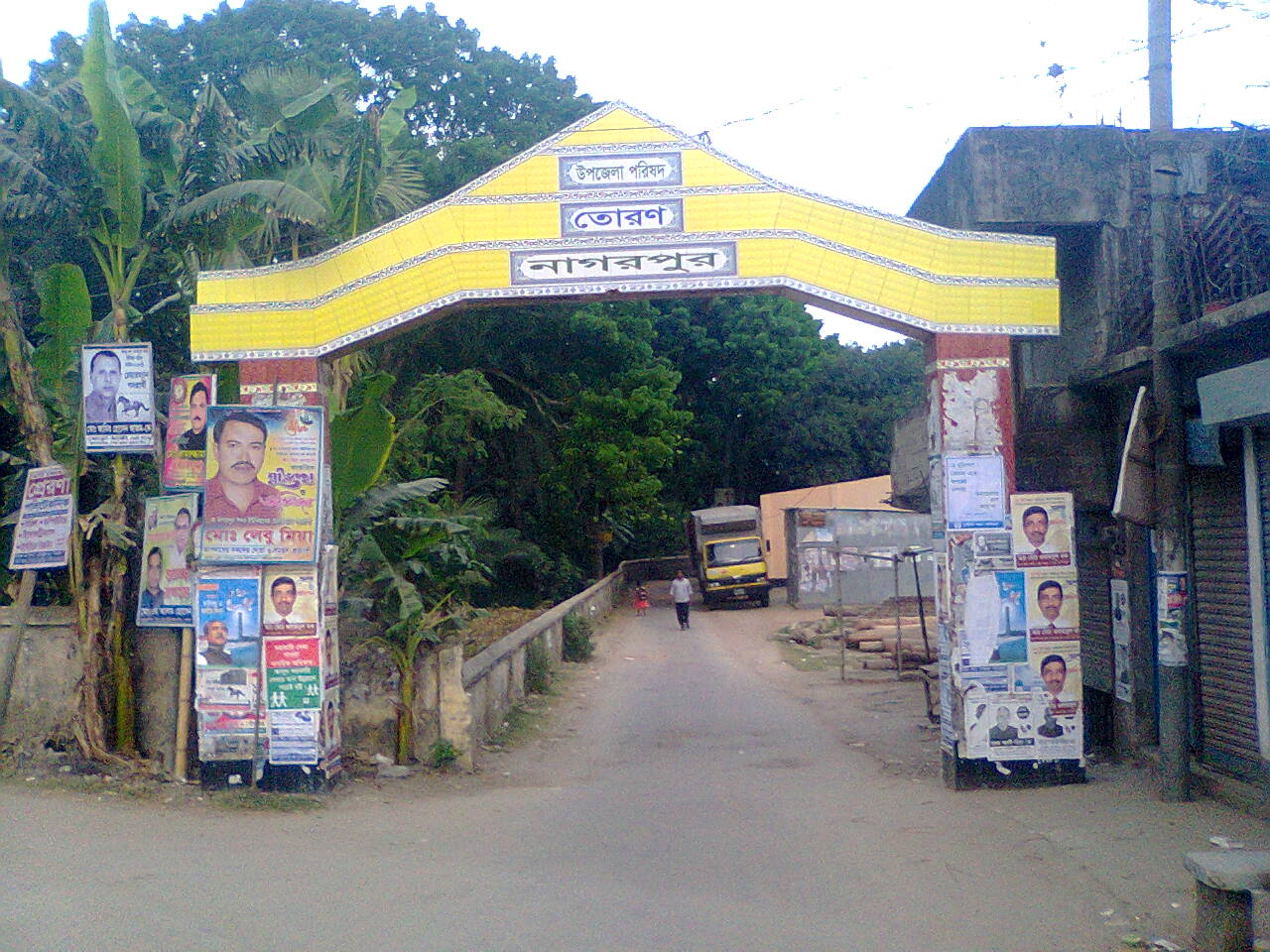
- Nagarpur Upazila Gate

- Coordinates: 24°3′N 89°52.5′E
- Country: Bangladesh
- Division: Dhaka
- District: Tangail
- Established on: 9 September 1983

Area
  - Total: 262.70 km^{2} (101.43 sq mi)

Population (2022)
  - Total: 319,296
  - Density: 1,097/km^{2} (2,840/sq mi)
- Time zone: UTC+6 (BST)
- Postal code: 1936
- Area code: 09233
- Website: nagarpur.tangail.gov.bd

Nagarpur Upazila mauza geocode map

Nagarpur (Bengali: নাগরপুর) is an upazila of Tangail District in the Division of Dhaka, Bangladesh. Nagarpur Thana was established in 1905 and was converted into an upazila in 1983.

== Geography ==
Nagarpur is located at 24.0500°N 89.8750°E. The total area of the Upazila is 266.7 km^{2}.

== Demographics ==
Religions in Nagarpur Upazila (2022)
Religion	Percent
Islam	93.65%
Hinduism	6.34%

According to the 2022 Bangladeshi census, Nagarpur Upazila had 83,885 households and a population of 319,296. 8.85% of the population were under 5 years of age. Nagarpur had a literacy rate (age 7 and over) of 66.63%: 69.59% for males and 64.08% for females, and a sex ratio of 88.04 males for every 100 females. 27,666 (8.66%) lived in urban areas.

According to the 2011 Census of Bangladesh, Nagarpur Upazila had 66,523 households and a population of 288,092. 68,426 (23.75%) were under 10 years of age. Nagarpur had a literacy rate (age 7 and over) of 42.74%, compared to the national average of 51.8%, and a sex ratio of 1109 females per 1000 males. 13,110 (4.55%) lived in urban areas.

== Administration ==
Nagarpur Upazila is divided into 12 union parishads: Bekra, Tengripara, Bharra, Dhubaria, Duptiair, Gayhata, Mamudnagar, Mokna, Nagarpur, Pakutia, Sahabatpur, and Salimabad. The union parishads are subdivided into 212 mauzas and 245 villages.

== Education ==
Nagarpur has an average literacy rate of 42.7% (Male-46.3%, Female-39.6%).

== See also ==
- Upazilas of Bangladesh
- Districts of Bangladesh
- Divisions of Bangladesh
- Union Councils of Tangail District
