= Nagarpur Union =

Nagarpur নাগরপুর
- Town
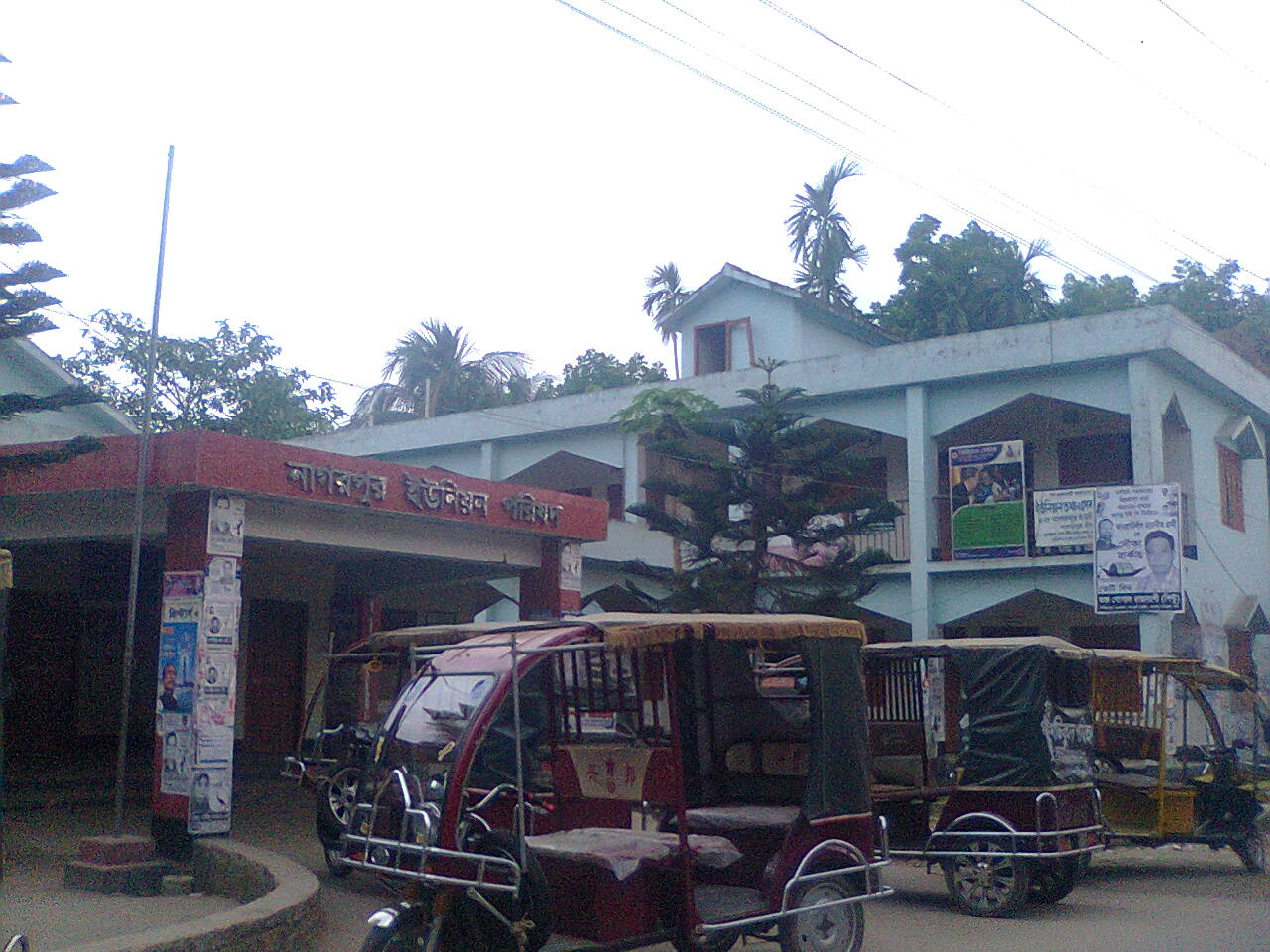
- Nagarpur Union Parishad Complex

- Location of Nagarpur in Bangladesh
- Coordinates: 24°3′29.2566″N 89°52′38.9532″E
- Country: Bangladesh
- Division: Dhaka Division
- District: Tangail District
- Upazila: Nagarpur Upazila
- Established on: 1984

Government
  - Type: Union Council
  - Chairman: Md Kudrot Ali (Bangladesh Awami League)

Area
  - Total: 17.75 km^{2} (6.85 sq mi)
- Elevation: 15 m (49 ft)

Population (2015)
  - Total: 38,422
  - Density: 2,165/km^{2} (5,606/sq mi)
- Time zone: UTC+6 (BST)
- Postal code: 1936
- Website: nagarpur.tangail.gov.bd

Nagarpur Union (Bengali: নাগরপুর ইউনিয়ন) is a town governed by a union council, located in Nagarpur Upazila, Tangail District, Bangladesh. It is situated 24 km south of Tangail city.

== Demographics ==
As of the 2011 Bangladeshi census, Nagarpur Union had 6,303 households and a population of 27,038.

== Education ==
The literacy rate of Nagarpur Union is 48% (Male-52.1%, Female-44.2%).

== See also ==
- Union Councils of Tangail District
