= Tangail District =

District in Dhaka Division, Bangladesh

Tangail District টাঙ্গাইল জেলা
- District of Bangladesh
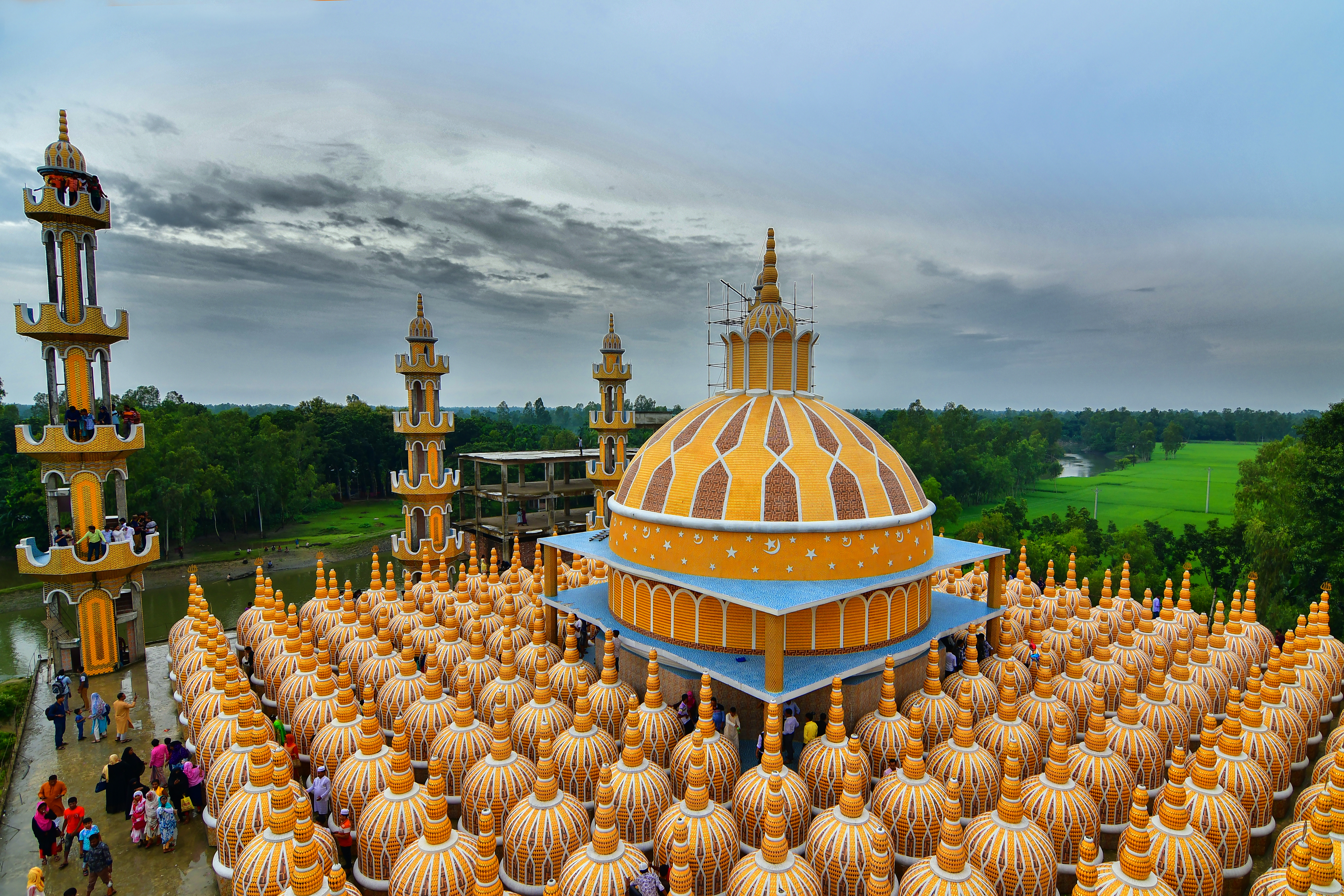
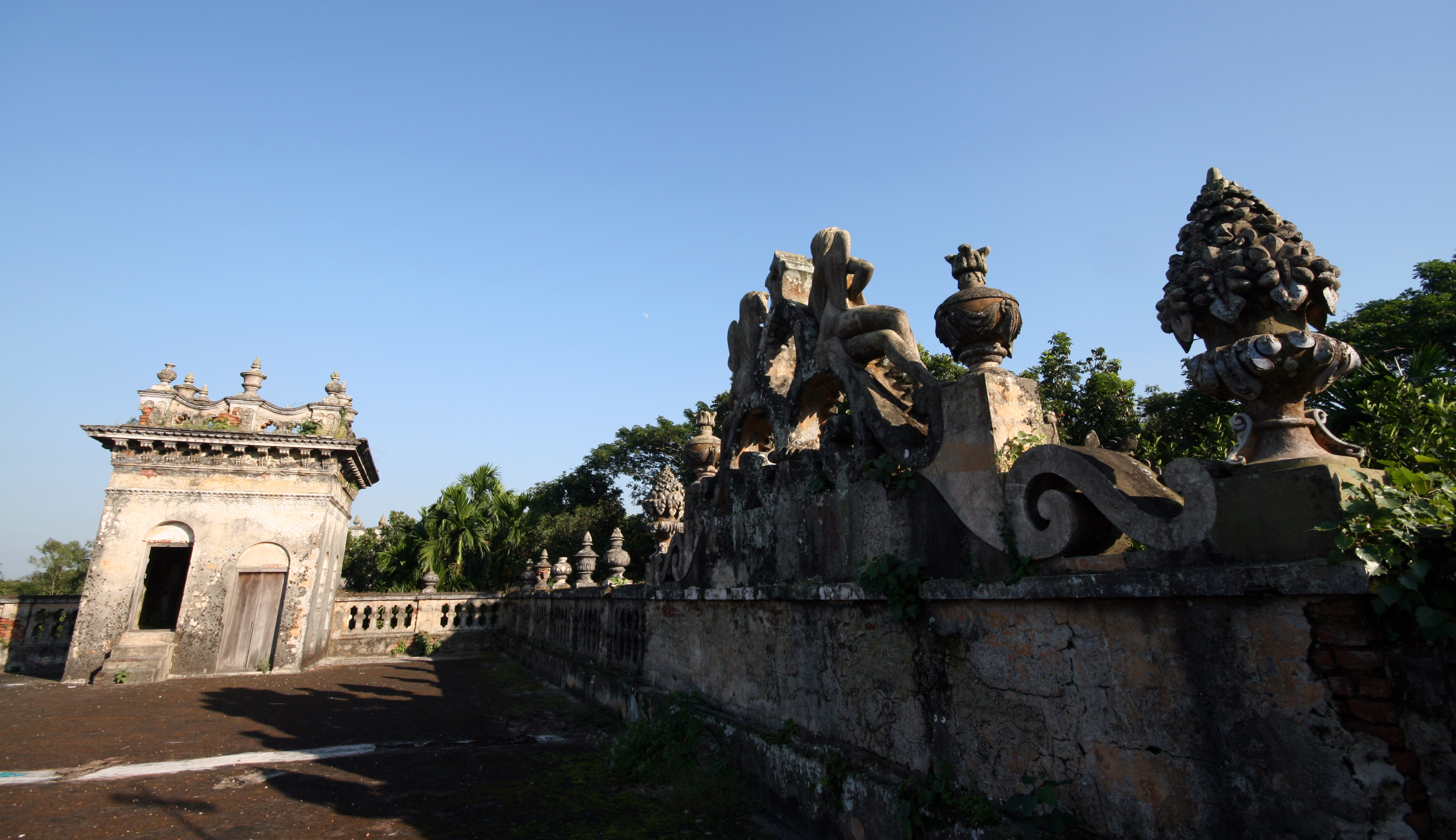
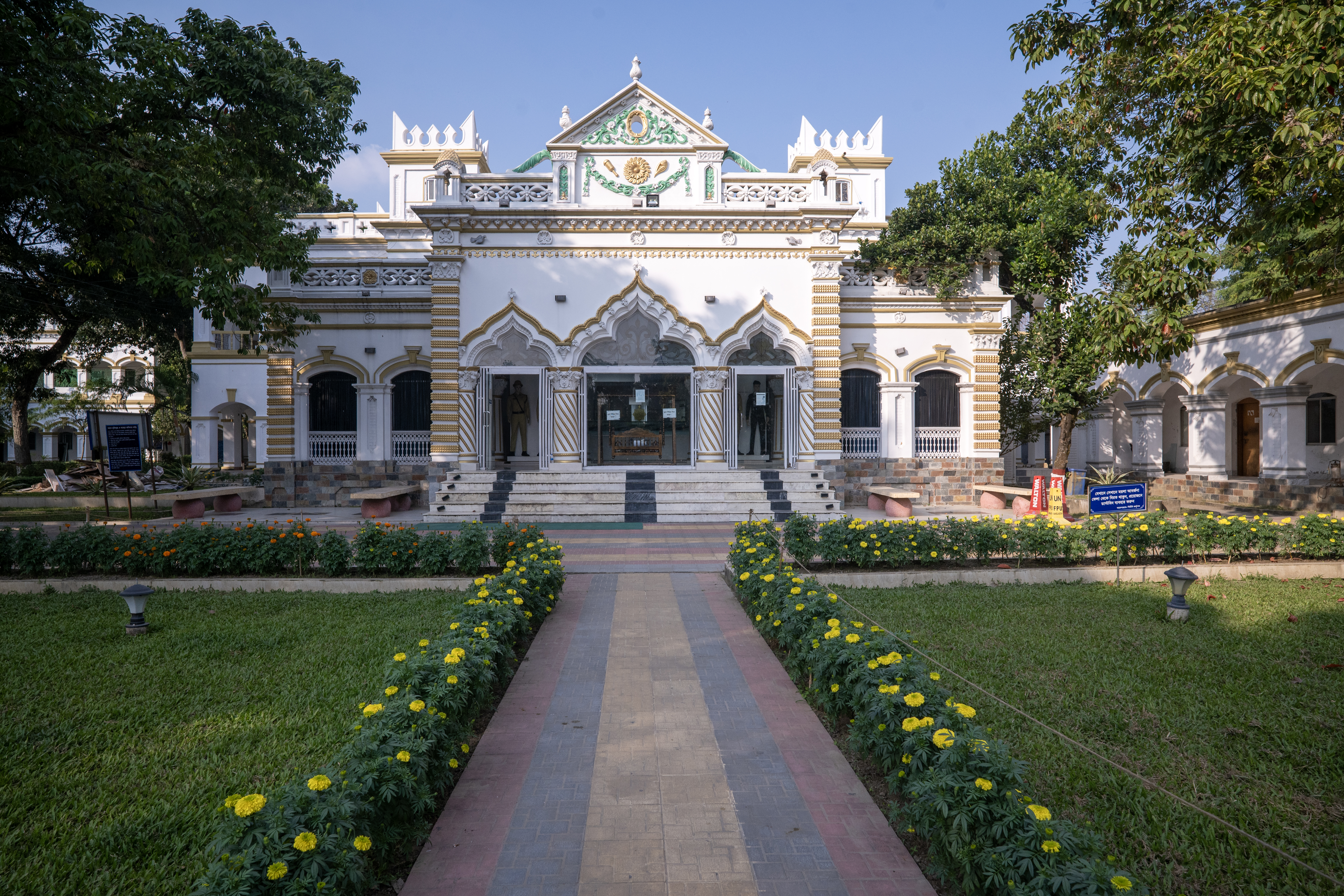
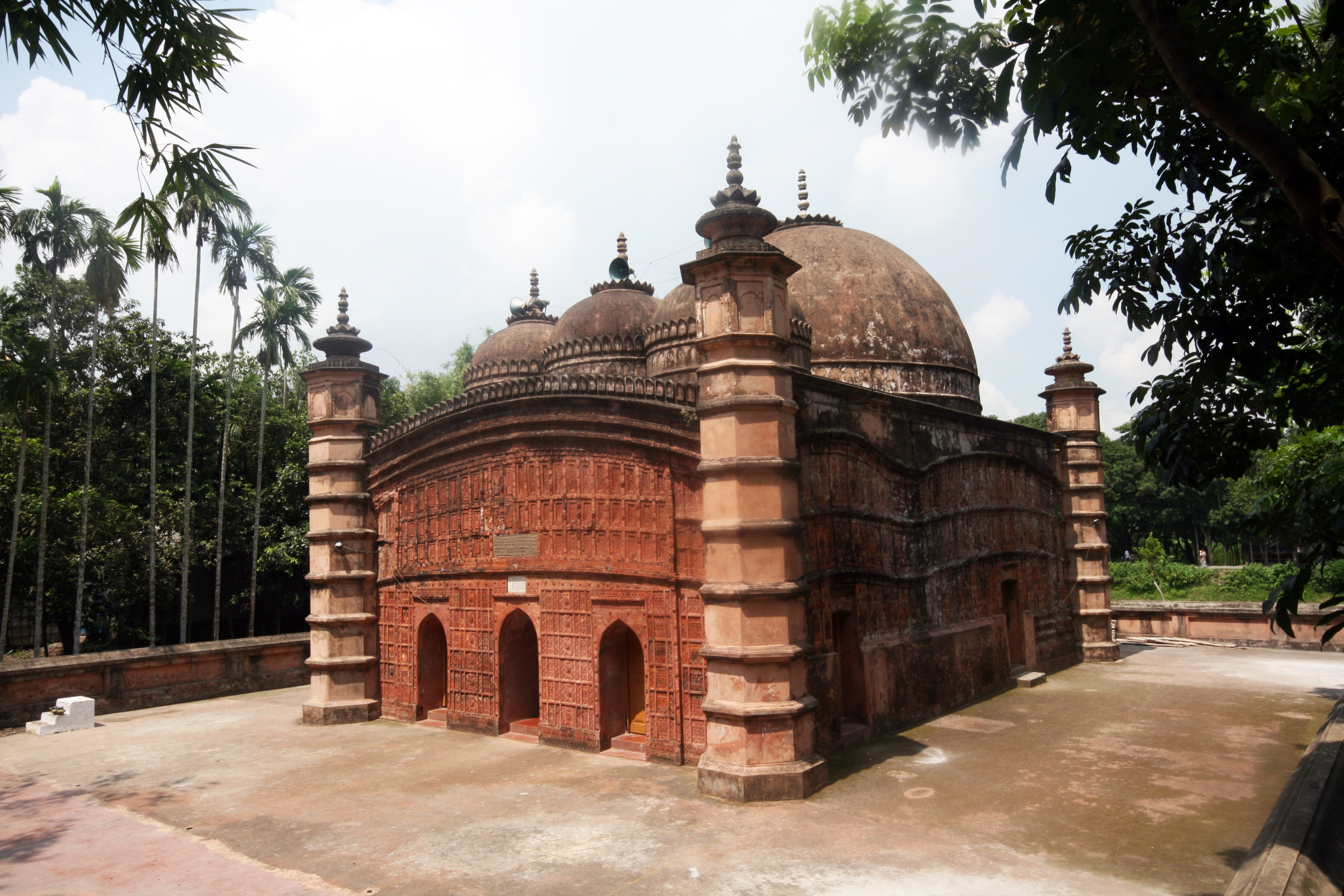
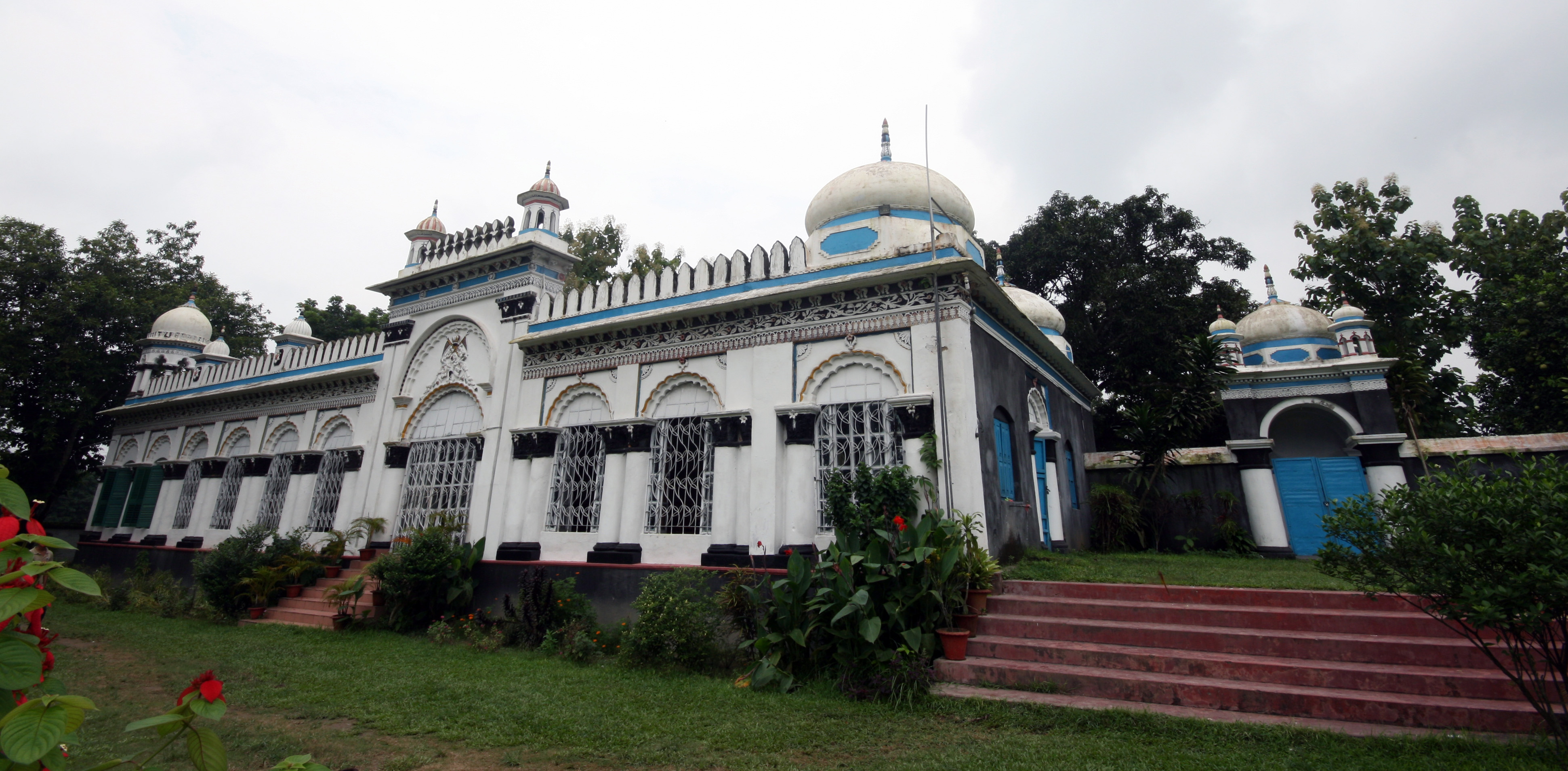
- 201 Dome Mosque, Mohera Zamindar Bari, Dhanbari Mosque, Tangail Gate, Atia Mosque, Sri Sri Kalibari

- Location of Tangail District in Bangladesh
- Expandable map of Tangail District
- Coordinates: 24.30°N 90.00°E
- Country: Bangladesh
- Division: Dhaka
- Established: 1 December 1969
- Headquarters: Tangail

Government
  - Deputy Commissioner: Jashim Uddin Haider

Area
  - District of Bangladesh: 3,414.28 km^{2} (1,318.26 sq mi)
  - Metro: 29.52 km^{2} (11.40 sq mi)

Population (2022)
  - District of Bangladesh: 4,037,316
  - Rank: 5th in Bangladesh
  - Density: 1,182.48/km^{2} (3,062.61/sq mi)
- Time zone: UTC+06:00 (BST)
- Postal code: 1900
- Area code: 0921
- ISO 3166 code: BD-63
- HDI (2023): 0.677 medium · 12th of 22
- Website: tangail.gov.bd

Tangail District (Bengali: টাঙ্গাইল জেলা, romanised: Ṭāṅgāil Jēlā) is a district (zila) in the central region of Bangladesh. The establishment of the Tangail began with 3269 square kilometres of land requisitioned from Mymensingh. Earlier it was a Mahakuma of Mymensingh district. The district consists of 237 square kilometres of the prior mahakuma and with 3,269 square kilometres of land from Mymensingh district. It is the largest district of Dhaka Division by area and second largest by population (after Dhaka district). The population of Tangail zila is about 4 million and its area is 3,414.28 square kilometres (1,318.26 sq mi). The main city of the district is Tangail. It is surrounded by Jamalpur District on the north, Dhaka and Manikganj Districts on the south, Mymensingh and Gazipur on the east, and Sirajganj on the west.

== History ==
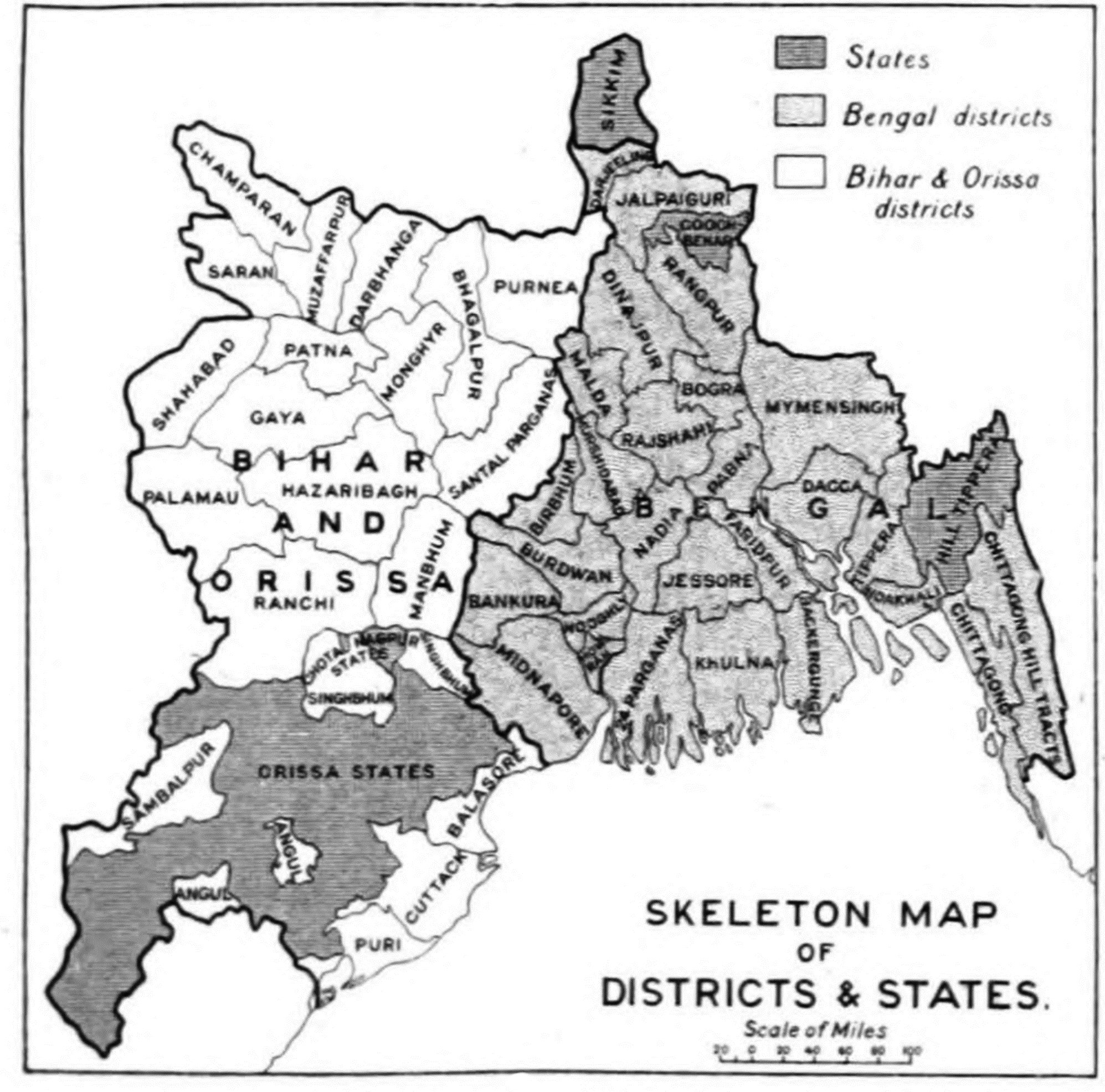
Provincial Map of Bengal showing Greater Mymensingh Area (present Mymensingh Division with Tangail and Kishoreganj) in 1917

The history of Tangail follows that of the greater part of East Bengal. Ruled by the Bengal Sultanate, it fell under Mughal domination in the 17th century. It became part of Atia pargana under the Sarkar of Bazhua of the Bengal Subah, before falling to the British East India Company. It was ruled by several zamindars including the Nawabs of Dhanbari.

Until 1969, Tangail was a part of Greater Mymensingh. In 1969 the Tangail District was established. Tangail district was created by Tangail Mohokuma from its 237 square kilometres of land and 3,177 square kilometres of land acquired from Mymensingh district. The main rivers that cross the Tangail district are the Jamuna, Dhaleshwari, Jhenai, Bangshi, Louhajang, Langulia, Elongjani, Jugni, Pouli, Fotikjani and the Turag.

== Administration ==
Tangail District upazila geocode map

Upazilas of Tangail

The subdivision of Tangail was established in 1870. It was turned into a district on 1 December 1969. The district consists of 11 municipalities, 108 wards of these municipalities, 109 Union Parishads and 2,516 villages.

Tangail district is subdivided into 12 Upazilas:

Name	Population (1991)	Population (2001)	Population (2011)	Population (2022)
Basail	148,555	160,346	159,870	188,916
Bhuapur	177,095	190,910	189,913	217,321
Delduar	175,684	188,449	207,278	218,710
Dhanbari	–	–	176,068	189,109
Ghatail	341,376	371,952	417,939	448,724
Gopalpur	252,747	274,273	252,331	270,321
Kalihati	354,959	376,407	410,293	449,451
Madhupur	–	422,889	296,729 (Note: Madhupur upazila was divided into Madhupur and Dhanbari upazilas)	337,368
Mirzapur	337,496	366,609	407,781	474,634
Nagarpur	238,422	258,431	288,092	319,270
Sakhipur	220,281	241,665	277,685	322,307
Tangail Sadar	380,518	438,765	521,104	601,185
Tangail District	3,002,428	3,290,696	3,605,083	4,037,316

== Demographics ==
Historical population
Year	Pop.	±% p.a.
1974	2,077,924	—
1981	2,442,607	+2.34%
1991	3,002,428	+2.08%
2001	3,290,696	+0.92%
2011	3,605,083	+0.92%
2022	4,037,316	+1.03%

According to the 2022 Census of Bangladesh, Tangail District had 1,061,746 households and a population of 4,037,316 with an average 3.75 people per household. Among the population, 696,537 (17.25%) inhabitants were under 10 years of age. The population density was 1,188 people per km^{2}. Tangail District had a literacy rate (age 7 and over) of 69.75%, compared to the national average of 74.80%, and a sex ratio of 1075 females per 1000 males. Approximately, 22.60% of the population lived in the urban areas. Ethnic population was 23,708 (0.59%), of which 12,610 were Garo, 5,219 Barman and 4,845 Koch.

== Religion ==
Religions in Tangail District (2022)
Religion	Percent
Islam	93.20%
Hinduism	6.37%
Other or not stated	0.43%

Religion in present-day Tangail District
Religion	1941 (Note: 1941 figures are for Tangail subdivision of erstwhile Mymensingh district, which roughly corresponds to the present district.)		1981		1991		2001		2011		2022	
Religion	Pop.	%	Pop.	%	Pop.	%	Pop.	%	Pop.	%	Pop.	%
Islam	956,006	73.83%	2,212,613	90.58%	2,747,921	91.52%	3,042,937	92.47%	3,342,596	92.72%	3,762,822	93.20%
Hinduism	336,081	25.96%	219,856	9.00%	236,106	7.86%	234,088	7.11%	246,237	6.83%	257,351	6.37%
Christianity	37	0.00%	7,328	0.30%	12,140	0.40%	12,820	0.39%	14,125	0.39%	15,191	0.38%
Others (Note: Including Jainism, Buddhism, Zoroastrianism, Judaism, Ad-Dharmis, or not stated)	2,679	0.21%	2,810	0.12%	3,739	0.22%	851	0.03%	2,125	0.06%	2,244	0.05%
Total Population	1,294,803	100%	2,442,607	100%	3,002,428	100%	3,290,696	100%	3,605,083	100%	4,037,608	100%

In 2011, Muslims made up 92.72% and Hindus 6.83% of the district's population. There is a small population of Christians near Madhupur National Park, mainly Garo tribals, while other ethnic communities: the Koch and Barman, are mainly Hindu and animist.

== Geography ==
The total area of the zila is 3,414.28 km^{2} (1318.00 sq mi), of which 497.27 km^{2} (192.00 sq mi) is forested. The zila lies between 24° 01′ and 24° 47′ north latitudes and between 89° 44′ and 90° 18′ east longitudes.

=== Border ===
The district borders Jamalpur district in the north, Dhaka district and Manikganj district in the south, Mymensingh district and Gazipur district in the east and Sirajganj district in the west.

== River system ==
Tangail district is flanked on the west by the Jamuna River, which is over 4 miles wide during the rainy season. The Dhaleswari, first an old channel of the Ganges and then of the Brahmaputra, cuts across the southwestern comer of the district on its powerful sweep to join the Meghna near Narayanganj. The old name of Dhaleswari was "Gajghata". It used to flow afterward by the Salimabad channel and then at last by Porabari channel.

A part of the eastern boundary of the district runs close to the Banar river. The river Bangshi flows almost down the middle of the district, branching out from the old Brahmaputra to the north from near Jamalpur. Bangshi falls into Dhaleswari near Savar, in Dhaka district. The Bangshi forms a natural barrier to the Madhupur Jungle on the Tangail side, all the way from Madhupur to Mirzapur Upazila. It is only fordable at two or three places near Basail on its way to river Meghna. Dhaleswari itself, however, takes out from the Jamuna from inside Tangail district.

Among other important rivers of the district, Lohajang is worth mentioning. It flows past the district headquarters of Tangail and is almost dead at present (in moribund condition). Other rivers are Khiru, Nanglai Nadi, Atai, Elengjani, Fatikjani, Bairan and Jhinai. The old Brahmaputra's most important offshoot is the Jhinai; striking off near Jamalpur it rejoins the Jamuna north of Sarishabari, while another branch flows past Gopalpur. Now these subsystems of rivers, viz Bangshi and Banar, and the Lohajang, Khiru, Nangtai Nadi, Atia and Jhinai are dying out because of the shift of the old Brahmaputra river from its former channel to the present Jamuna channel.

== Education ==
The central school of Tangail is Bindu Basini Govt. Boys' High School established in 1880. Bindu Basini Govt. Girls' High School was established in 1882. These two schools were patronised and endowed by Rani Bindubasini Roy Chowdhurany and were named after her. These are nationally rewarded double shift schools.

Santosh Jahnnabi High School was established in 1870. It is the oldest school in Tangail and the second oldest in the greater Mymensingh district. Shibnath High School, Vivekananda High school, Police Lines High School, Zilla Sadar Girls' High School are some high schools in Tangail.

In 1926, the Government Saadat College was established by Wazed Ali Khan Panni, a zamindar and educationalist of Tangail. He named it after the name of his grandfather Saadat Ali Khan Panni. Govt. M. M. Ali College was established by Maulana Abdul Hamid Khan Bhasani at Kagmari (1 km from the main city) is one of the first government colleges in Bangladesh. Kumudini College was established in 1943 by Ranada Prasad Saha, philanthropist of Tangail. He named it after his mother Kumudini. Later the college was converted into Kumudini Government Women's College. He also established Bharateswari Homes in 1945 at Mirzapur. He named it after his grandmother Bharateswari Devi. Mirzapur Cadet College, the third cadet college of the country, was established in 1963. The then president of Pakistan Field Marshal Ayub Khan took initiatives to establish this cadet college.

There is a technical university named Mawlana Bhashani Science and Technology University at Santosh, Tangail. A government textile engineering college named Bangabandhu Textile Engineering College (BTEC) at Kalihati, Tangail was established in 2007. A government medical college named Tangail Medical College, Tangail is located in Tangail. This medical college was established in 2014.

Tangail has 341 non-government high schools, 86 satellite schools, 5 government colleges, 48 non-government colleges, 3 university colleges, 1 textile engineering college, 1 medical college, 1 law college, 1 homoeopathy college, 1 textile institute,1 polytechnic institute, 1 Medical assistant training school, 2 nursing institutes, 1 police academy, 202 madrasas, 40 secondary schools (SSC), 941 government primary schools, 395 non-government primary schools, 1 teachers' training school, 146 community primary schools and 1304 NGO-operated schools.

== Urbanisation ==
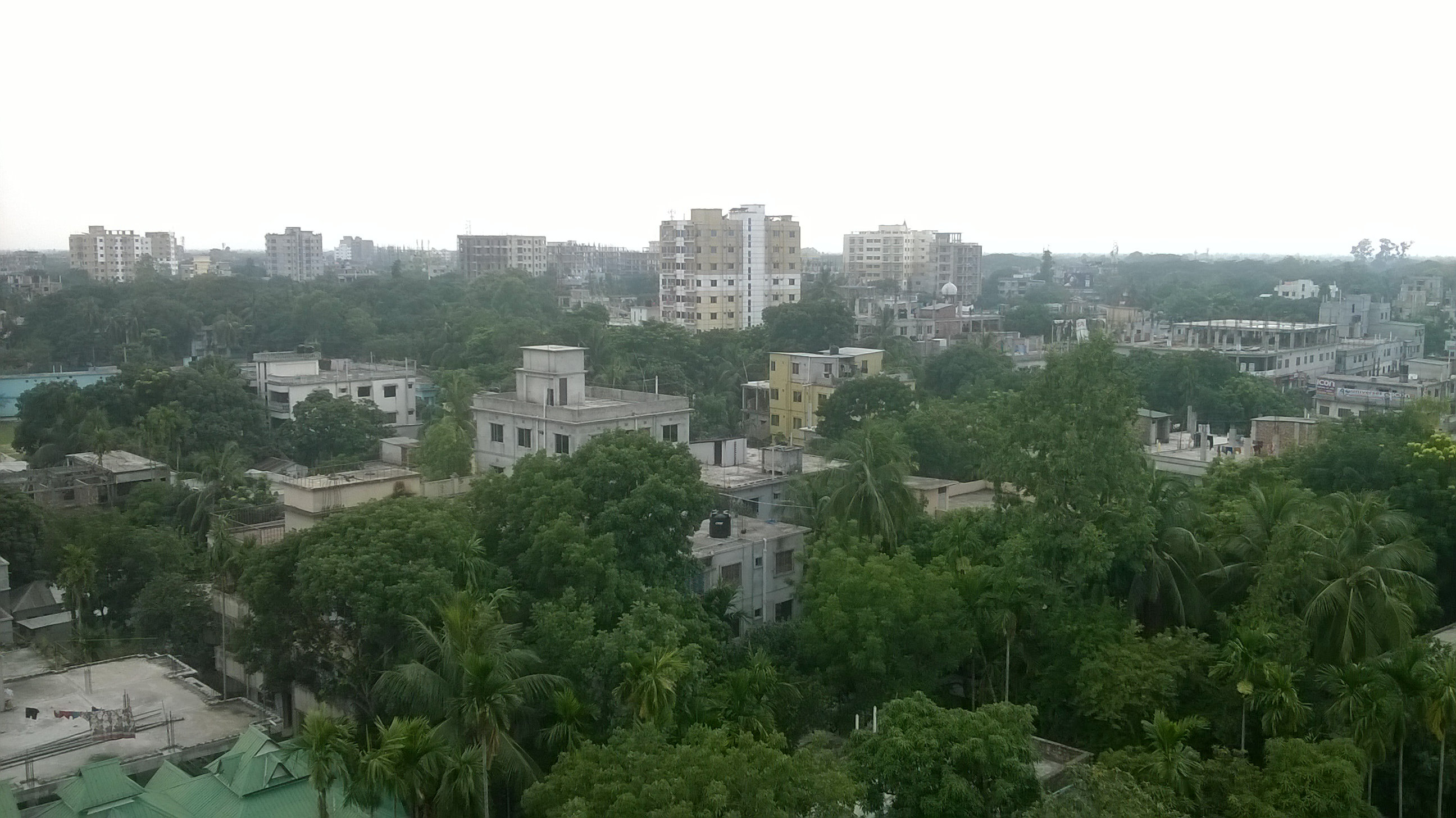
Tangail City

The urban growth rate of Tangail District is increasing as it is close to the capital of Bangladesh, Dhaka. There are 11 municipalities in Tangail District. Tangail municipality is planned to be converted into a City Corporation in next couple of years alongside 11 other old district headquarters of Bangladesh.

Urban area	Area (km2)	No. of wards	Population
Tangail	29.43	18	212,887
Gopalpur	23.12	9	50,160
Sakhipur	18.27	9	30,028
Bhuapur	13.92	9	28,708
Madhupur	24.77	9	56,342
Ghatail	11.02	9	35,245
Kalihati	14.52	9	37,038
Elenga	23.24	9	55,000
Basail		9	13,496
Mirzapur	8.58	9	28,602
Nagarpur	8.58	9	28,602
Dhanbari	25.62	9	36,125

== Economy ==
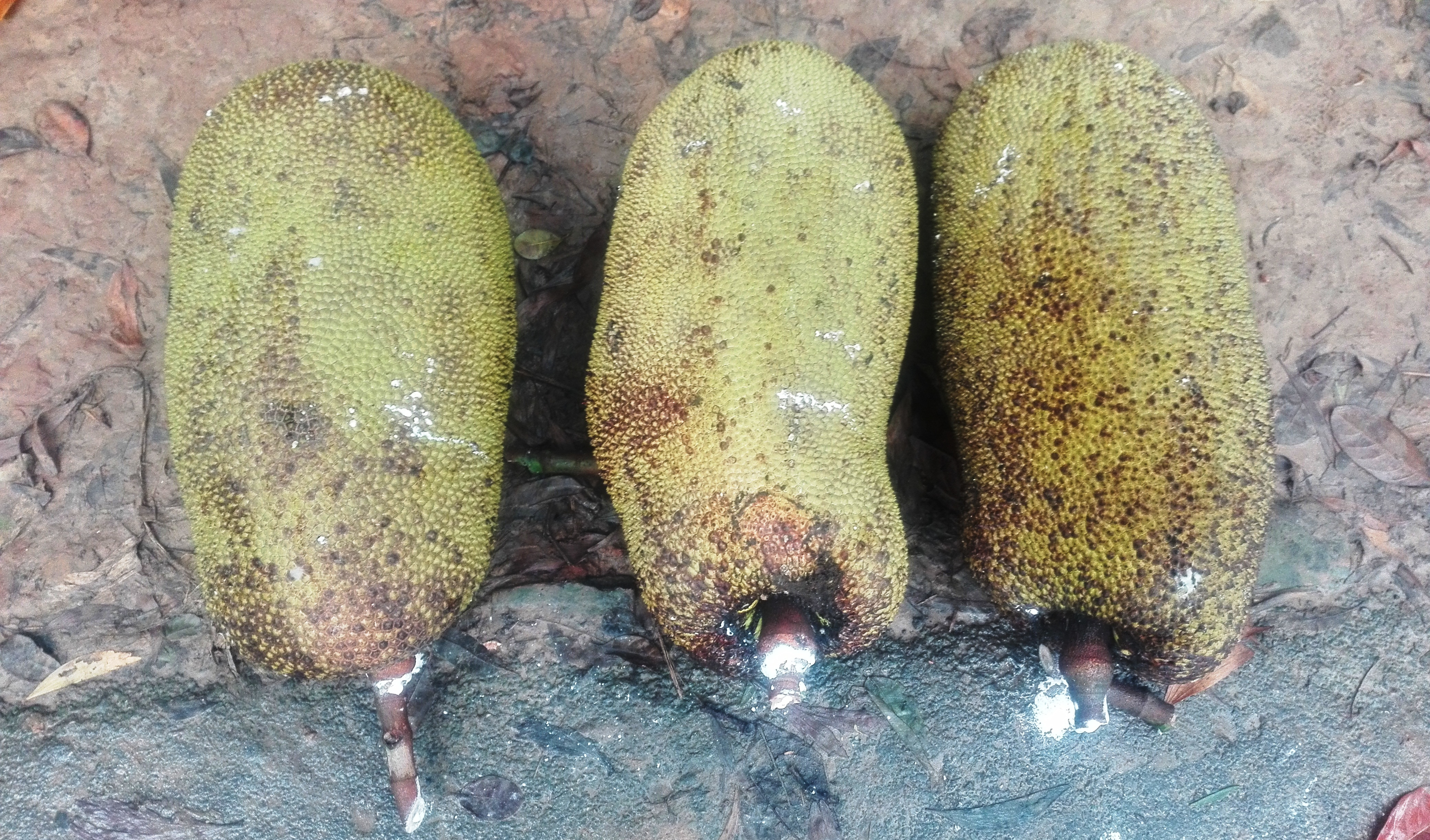
Jackfruit, Modhupur Tangail

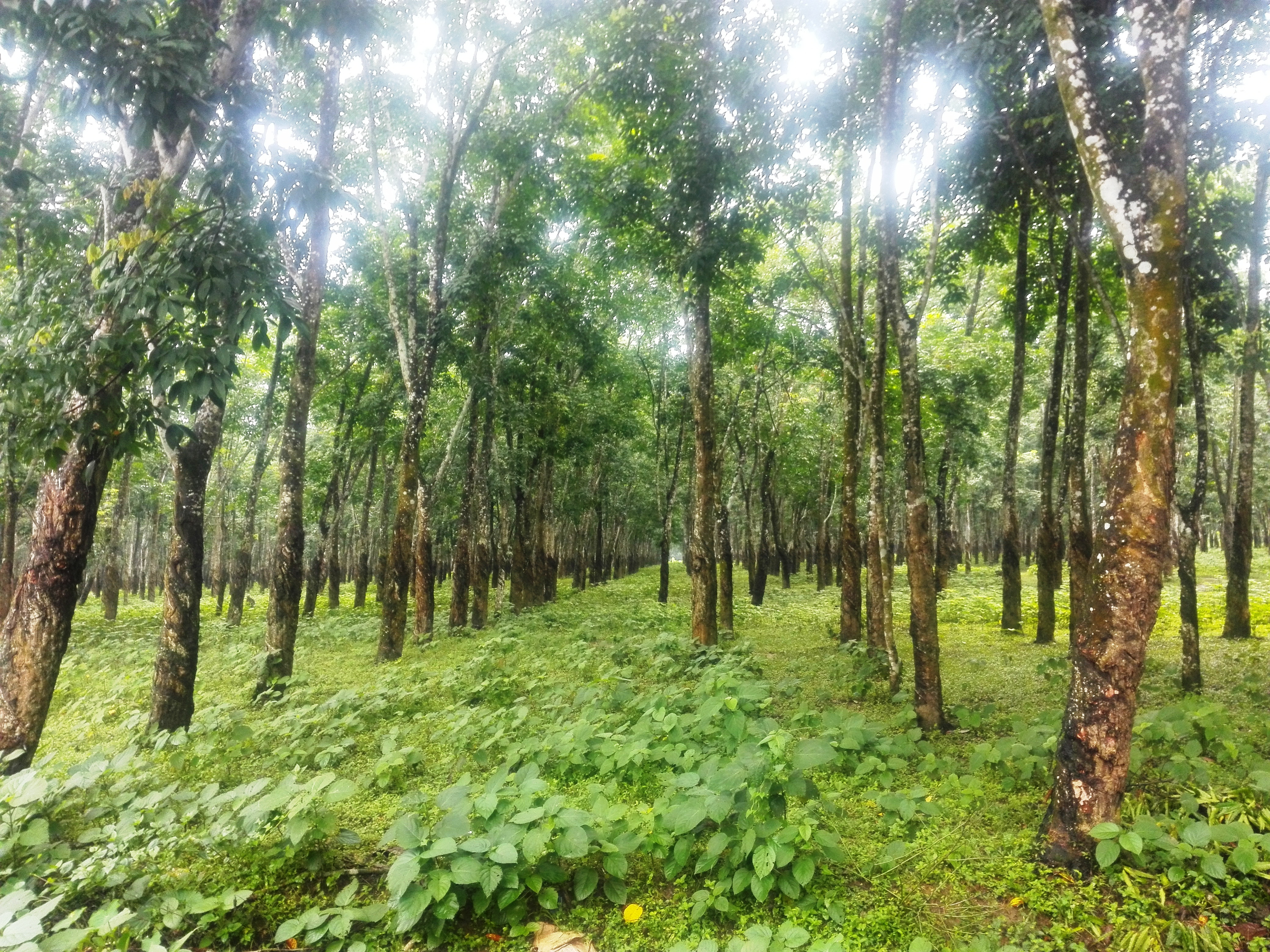
Rubber garden, Pirgacha, Tangail

Agriculture is the main occupation of the Tangail district. About 49.53% of people are involved with agricultural activities. Its main agricultural products are paddy, potato, jute, sugarcane, sesame, linseed, wheat, mustard seed and pulse. About 3,386.53 km^{2} (1,307.55 sq mi) of cultivable lands are available in Tangail. The main fruit products are mangos, jackfruit, bananas, litchis, and pineapples. Other sectors, such as fisheries (446), dairies (189), industries, weaving and poultry farms (538) are developing in the Tangail district. Tangail is the home of the weavers of the world-famous "Tangail Saree".

=== Sarees ===
Tangail Saree a handloom saree made of cotton and silk thread having hand-worked butte design, all-over flowery design, or contemporary art motif is appreciated, bought, and used by women and girls of Bangladeshi and Indian origin all over the world. Tangail Saris are famous at home and abroad. Large numbers of sarees are sold on the occasion of Eid, Puja, Pahela Boishakh and wedding season between November and February. The weavers get orders from home and abroad. Tangail Sarees are produced in Tangail Sadar Upazila, Delduar Upazila and Kalihati Upazila. Pathrail in Delduar Upazila and Barabelta, Kabilapara (Porabari Union) in Sadar Upazila are famous for fine and expensive sarees.

A survey conducted in 2013 said there were 60,000 looms in Tangail. Of them, 8,305 are pit looms, 51,141 are Chittranjan looms and 892 are power looms. About 325,000 labourers, owners and traders are connected with the profession. The factories have been producing Tangail sarees worth Tk 300-Tk 20,000 apiece.

=== Industry ===
There are many industries growing rapidly in Gorai Industrial Area. These include Square Group, Nasir Glassware industry, Olympic Battery, North Bengal cycle industry, and Tangail Cotton mill. There are many garments and textiles in Gorai. BSCIC Tarotia also has some industries. Alauddin Textile mill is in Tangail.

== Notable people ==
- Mafizuddin Ahmed, first vice-chancellor of Jahangirnagar University, founding President of the Bangladesh Chemical Society, former chairman of the BCSIR.
- Rafiq Azad, poet
- Muhammad Abdul Bari, physicist, former Secretary General Muslim Council of Britain
- Debapriya Bhattacharya, economist
- Abu Sayeed Chowdhury, 2nd President of Bangladesh, 12th Vice-Chancellor of the University of Dhaka, first High Commissioner of Bangladesh to the United Kingdom
- Syed Hasan Ali Chowdhury, politician
- Syed Nawab Ali Chowdhury, Nawab of Dhanbari, founder of University of Dhaka
- Tarak Chandra Das, anthropologist
- Fazlur Rahman Faruque, politician and Ekushey Padak award recipients
- Abdul Halim Ghaznavi, politician
- Admiral M. Farid Habib, 13th Chief of Naval Staff of Bangladesh
- Maj General (Rtd.) Mahmudul Hasan, politician
- Shamsul Huq, politician, first General Secretary of Awami League
- Sayed Moazzem Hossain, 6th Vice-Chancellor of the University of Dhaka
- Ibrahim Khan, litterateur, politician
- Abdur Rahman Khan, Cabinet Minister
- Kh. Momota Hena Lovely, member of Jatiya Sangsad
- Abdul Mannan, politician
- Dr. Abdur Razzak, former minister of Minister of Agriculture, Food, Disaster Management and Relief of Bangladesh
- Bangabir Kader Siddique, politician and Mukti Bahini member, leader of Kader Bahini
- P. C. Sorcar, father of Modern Indian Magic

== See also ==
- Tangail Airdrop by the Indian Army in 1971
- Tangail Airport
- Atia Mosque
- Tangail Railway Station
- Tangail Stadium
