= Bhattacharya (surname) =

Origin
- Origin: Bengali Hindu
- Region of origin: Bengal

Bhattacharya, Bhattacharyya, and Bhattacharjee are three common spellings of a Bengali Brahmin and Assamese Brahmin surname, Bhoṭṭacarjo (ভট্টাচার্য). In Bengal, Bhattacharjees, together with Banerjees, Chatterjees, Gangulys and Mukherjees, form the Kulin Brahmins.

== Notables ==
- A. Bhattacharya, Indian statistician who worked at the Indian Statistical Institute in the 1930s and early 40s
- Abhi Bhattacharya (1921−1993), Indian actor of Hindi and Bengali cinema
- Abhijeet Bhattacharya (born 1958), Indian playback singer and composer
- Abhinash Bhattacharya, leader in revolutionary movement for Indian independence
- Aditya Bhattacharya (born 1965), Indian film director and screenwriter, Raakh
- Ajay Bhattacharya (born 1914), Bengali communist revolutionary and anti-colonial activist
- Amitabha Bhattacharya, Indian professor at the Indian Institute of Technology Kharagpur and an author of digital communication
- Amitabh Bhattacharya, Indian lyricist and playback singer who works in Bollywood
- Anirban Bhattacharya, Indian actor
- Arindam Bhattacharya, Indian politician, Member of West Bengal Legislative Assembly and President, West Bengal Youth Congress
- Arindam Bhattacharya, Indian footballer
- Arundhati Bhattacharya, Indian banker (former Chairman, State Bank of India)
- Asoke Kumar Bhattacharyya (1919−2016), Indian archaeologist
- Atanu Bhattacharya, Indian football goalkeeper coach
- B. B. Bhattacharya, Indian economist and educationist
- Basu Bhattacharya (1934−1997), Indian film director (Bollywood)
- Bhabani Bhattacharya (1906–1988), Indian writer, Indo-English literature
- Bibhu Bhattacharya (1944−2011), Indian male actor in Bengali cinema
- Bidhayak Bhattacharya (1907−1986), Indian playwright, litterateur and journalist
- Bijon Bhattacharya (1917−1978), Indian theatre and film personality
- Bikash Bhattacharya, Indian politician
- Birendra Kumar Bhattacharya (1924−1997), Indian novelist and modern Assamese littérateur
- Biswajit Bhattacharya, Indian footballer, manager, and head coach on many prominent Indian domestic league teams
- Buddhadeb Bhattacharjee (1944–2024), Indian politician, member of the politburo of the Communist Party of India, Chief Minister of West Bengal (2000–2011)
- Chandril Bhattacharya, Indian singer
- Charu Chandra Bhattacharya (1883−1961), prominent Indian science teacher and writer of various scientific articles mainly for children in Bangla
- Chitra Bhattacharya (1926–2010), Bangladeshi politician from the Awami League and member of parliament
- Chittaprosad Bhattacharya, Indian political artist of the mid-20th century
- Debashish Bhattacharya (born 1963), Indian classical musician who plays the lap slide guitar
- Debapriya Bhattacharya, Bangladeshi economist and public policy analyst
- Deben Bhattacharya (1921−2001), Indian radio producer, record producer, ethnomusicologist, anthropologist, documentary filmmaker, photographer
- Debesh Bhattacharya (1914–2004), Bangladeshi jurist and judge (Appellate level of the Bangladesh Supreme Court)
- Devoleena Bhattacharjee, Indian television actress
- Dhananjay Bhattacharya, Indian singer (son of Surendranath Bhattacharya)
- Dipankar Bhattacharya, Indian politician
- Durga Mohan Bhattacharyya, Indian scholar and professor of Sanskrit.
- Dwaipayan Bhattacharyya, celebrated Indian political scientist.
- Ganga Kishore Bhattacharya (died 1831), Indian journalist, teacher and reformer
- Gautam Bhattacharya, Indian sports journalist, sports editor of the Ananda Bazar Patrika
- Gopal Chandra Bhattacharya (1895−1981), Indian entomologist and naturalist
- Haridas Bhattacharya (1891−1956), Indian philosopher and educationist
- Hiren Bhattacharyya (1932–2012), Indian Assamese language poet
- Jaya Bhattacharya, Indian television actress
- Jay Bhattacharya (born 1968), Indian professor of medicine, economics, and health research policy
- Jogendra Nath Bhattacharya, Indian pandit and one of a group of Hindu nationalists who held a benevolent view of the traditional role of caste in Indian society
- Kamalakanta Bhattacharya (1769–1821), Indian poet of the late 18th century
- Kanailal Bhattacharya, Indian educationist, former minister of Commerce and Industries and food department, West Bengal
- Kanailal Bhattacharya, Indian nationalist
- Kankan Bhattacharyya, Indian scientist prominent for work on modern non-linear laser spectroscopy
- Kedarnath Bhattacharya, Indian municipal leader, first elected vice-chairman of Howrah Municipal Corporation
- Kumar Sanu/Kedarnath Bhattacharya (born 1957), Indian playback singer
- Krishna Chandra Bhattacharya (1875−1949), Indian philosopher (Calcutta University)
- Kumar Bhattacharyya, Baron Bhattacharyya, CBE (1940−2019), British Indian engineer, educator and government advisor
- Lilabati Bhattacharjee, Indian mineralogist and former Director (Mineral Physics), Geological Survey of India
- Lokenath Bhattacharya (1927−2001), prolific Indo-French writer and philosopher
- Madhuri Bhattacharya, Indian actress and former model who has appeared in Kannada and Bollywood films
- Mahesh Chandra Nyayratna Bhattacharyya CIE (1836−1906), Indian scholar of Sanskrit, principal of the Sanskrit College for over 18 years
- Monoranjan Bhattacharya, Indian football international player and a club level coach and manager
- Nabarun Bhattacharya (1948−2014), Indian writer
- Nagendra Kumar Bhattacharyya (1888−1967), Indian politician, Commissioner of the Berhampore Municipality from 1932 to 1948
- Nalinidhar Bhattacharya (1921−2016), Indian Assamese language poet and literary critic
- Narendra Nath Bhattacharyya (1887−1954), Indian revolutionary, radical activist and political theorist, known as M. N. Roy
- Nirmalendu Bhattacharya (died 2020), Indian politician
- Nivedita Bhattacharya, Indian actress
- P. C. Bhattacharya, Indian central banker, seventh Governor of the Reserve Bank of India from 1 March 1962 to 30 June 1967
- Panchanan Bhattacharya (1853−1919), Indian yogi and chief disciple of Yogiraj Sri Shama Churun Lahiri Mahasaya
- Pannalal Bhattacharya, Indian singer
- Pushpak Bhattacharyya, Indian computer scientist and a prominent researcher in Natural Language Processing (NLP).
- Rinki Bhattacharya (born 1942), Indian writer, columnist and documentary filmmaker
- Ritwik Bhattacharya, Indian squash player
- Sameer Bhattacharya, Indian American guitarist for Texas rock band Flyleaf
- Sanjiv Bhattacharya, British Indian journalist based in the US
- Santanu Bhattacharya (1958), Indian scientist, Director of the IISER Tirupati, former professor, IISc Bangalore and former Director, IACS Kolkata.
- Santosh Bhattacharyya (1924−2011), Indian scholar, Vice-Chancellor of the University of Calcutta
- Santosh Chandra Bhattacharyya, Bangladeshi professor at Dhaka University and an intellectual martyr in the Bangladesh Liberation War
- Sharmila Bhattacharya, Indian American head of the Biomodel Performance and Behavior laboratory at NASA Ames Research Center
- Shoumo Bhattacharya, Indian medical doctor and academic
- Siva Brata Bhattacherjee (1921−2003), Indian Professor of physics and crystallographer, University of Calcutta
- Sonali Bhattacharyya (born 1978), British playwright
- Soumya Bhattacharya (born 1969), Indian journalist and author
- Subrata Bhattacharya, Indian football Defender who played for India in the 1984 Asian Cup
- Suchitra Bhattacharya (1950−2015), Indian novelist
- Sukanta Bhattacharya (1926−1947), Indian language poet and playwright
- Suma Bhattacharya, Indian model and film actress
- Sushil Bhattacharya (1924 - 2015), Indian footballer and veteran coach, first official coach of East Bengal Club, Indian Women's Football Team and Bengal Women's Football Team
- Tanmoy Bhattacharya, Indian politician
- Tarun Bhattacharya, Indian classical musician who plays the santoor, a type of hammered dulcimer
- Utpal Bhattacharya, Indian American finance professor at the Indiana University Kelley School of Business
- Vidyadhar Bhattacharya, Indian architect, chief city planner of Jaipur
- Shishir Bhattacharja, Bangladeshi linguist and writer
