= Kalihati Upazila =

Kalihati কালিহাতী
- Upazila
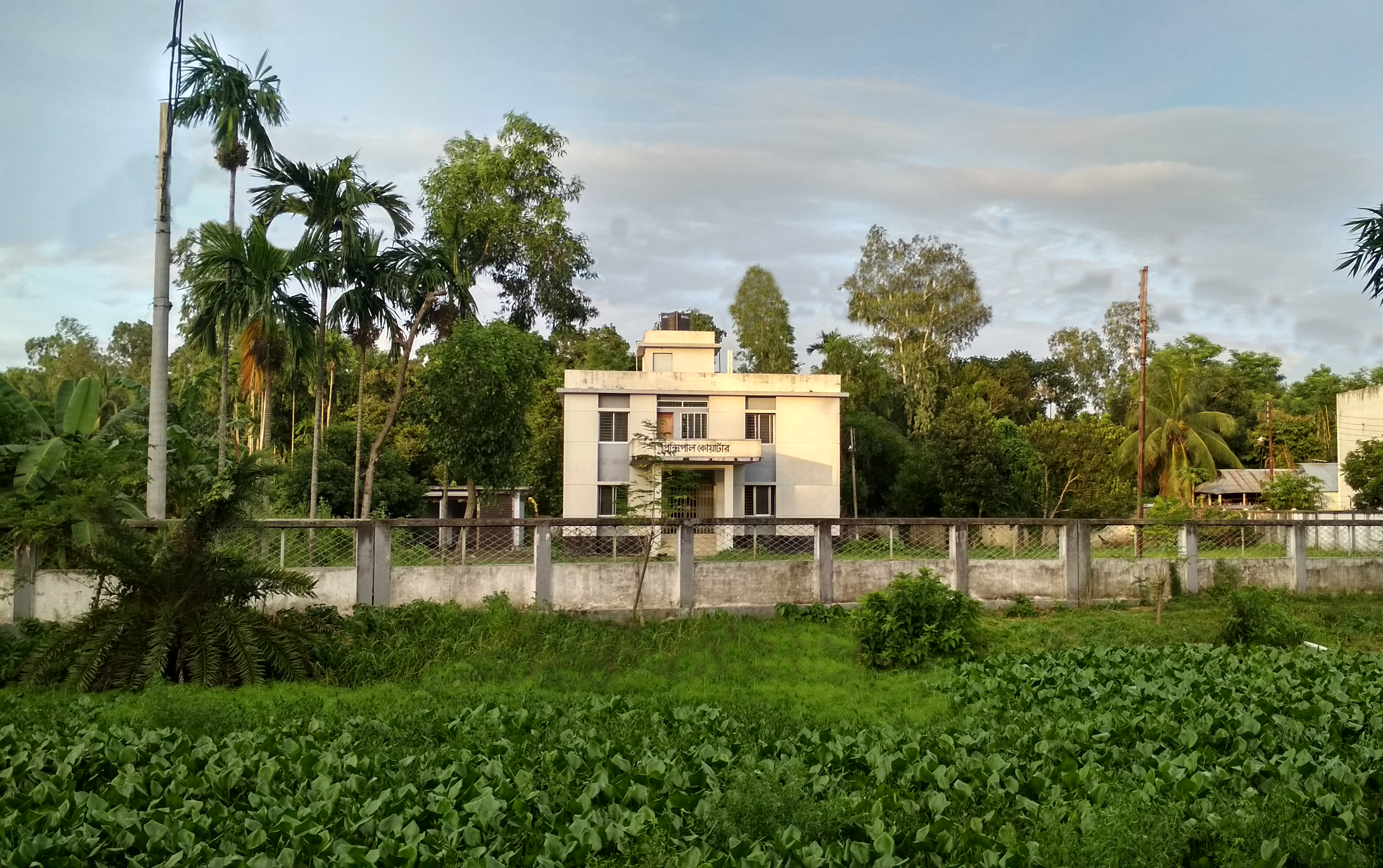
- Principle's Quarter, Bangabandhu Textile Engineering College

- Coordinates: 24°23′N 90°0.5′E
- Country: Bangladesh
- Division: Dhaka
- District: Tangail
- Headquarters: Kalihati

Area
  - Total: 295.60 km^{2} (114.13 sq mi)

Population (2022)
  - Total: 449,477
  - Density: 1,520.6/km^{2} (3,938.2/sq mi)
- Time zone: UTC+6 (BST)
- Postal code: 1970
- Area code: 09227
- Website: Official website of Kalihati

Kalihati Upazila mauza geocode map

Kalihati (Bengali: কালিহাতী) is an upazila of Tangail District, Dhaka Division, Bangladesh.

== History ==
It has a historical background during the liberation war in 1971. A great child of this land named Kader Siddiqui who later gained the great title "Bir Uttom" for his contribution to the war. After the liberation war he gave 32 trucks of weapons to the government. In the liberation period he formed a group named "Kaderia Bahini" with the brave bangalees. The "Kaderia Bahini" was very ferocious against the Pakistanis.

The Kalihati thana was established in 1928 and was turned into an upazila in 1983.

== Geography ==
Kalihati is located at 24.3833°N 90.0083°E. It has 98,702 households and total area of 295.6 km^{2}.The upazila is surrounded by Bhuapur & Ghatail upazilas on the north, Tangail Sadar and Basail Upazila on the south, Sakhipur Upazila on the east, and the Jamuna River on the west.

== Demographics ==
Religions in Kalihati Upazila (2022)
Religion	Percent
Islam	92.65%
Hinduism	7.33%

According to the 2022 Bangladeshi census, Kalihati Upazila had 117,216 households and a population of 449,477. 8.65% of the population were under 5 years of age. Kalihati had a literacy rate (age 7 and over) of 67.93%: 71.09% for males and 65.02% for females, and a sex ratio of 93.10 males for every 100 females. 122,341 (27.22%) lived in urban areas.

According to the 2011 Census of Bangladesh, Kalihati Upazila had 98,702 households and a population of 410,293. 87,090 (21.23%) were under 10 years of age. Kalihati had a literacy rate (age 7 and over) of 42.90%, compared to the national average of 51.8%, and a sex ratio of 1024 females per 1000 males. 39,496 (9.63%) lived in urban areas.

== Administration ==
Kalihati Upazila is divided into 2 municipalities and 13 union parishads: Balla, Bangra, Bir Bashinda, Dashkia, Durgapur, Gohaliabari, Kok Dohora, Nagbari Union, Narandia, Paikara, Parkhi, Salla and Shahadebpur.

Kalihati Municipality is subdivided into 9 wards and 18 mahallas.

Elenga Municipality was established in 2013.

== Education ==
- Biyara Marua Govt. Primary School
- Paikara M.U High School
- Paikara Govt. Primary School
- Elenga High School
- Jetendra Bala Girls High School
- Samsul Haque College
- Lutfor Rahman Motin Mohila College
- Elenga BM College
- Bangabandhu Textile Engineering College
- Kalihati College
- Kalihati R S Govt. Pilot High School
- Rajafair High School
- Nagbari Hasina Chowdhury High School
- Balla high school and College
- Rampur High School
- Lion Ferdous alom Firoz high School & College
- Narandia TRKN High School & College
- Nagar Bari Agriculture College
- Nagar Bari BM College
- Gopal Dighi K.P.U. High School
- Kasturipara Adarsha Junior Girls School
- Khilda High School
- Potol High School
- Shahid Jamal High School
- Dhimukha Govt. Primary School

== Notable residents ==
- Chowdhury family of Nagbari
  - Abdul Hamid Chowdhury (died 1969), speaker in parliament
  - Abu Sayeed Chowdhury (1921–1987), former President of Bangladesh (1972–1973)
  - Abul Hasan Kaiser Chowdhury (born 1951), former State Minister of Foreign Affairs
- Siddiqui family of Chhatihati
  - Ashraf Siddiqui (1927–2020), poet
  - Abdul Latif Siddiqui (born 1937), Member of Parliament for constituency Tangail-4 1996–2001 and 2009–2015
  - Abdul Kader Siddique (born 1947), military leader and politician
  - Laila Siddiqui, politician
- Mirza family of Agacharan
  - Mirza Mazharul Islam (1927–2020), surgeon and language activist
  - Mirza Mofazzal Islam (born 1965), scientist
- Bhattacharya family of Elenga
  - Debesh Bhattacharya (1914–2004), jurist
  - Debapriya Bhattacharya (born 1956), economist
- Reazuddin Ahmad Mashadi [Charan] (1952–2018), author
- Shajahan Siraj (1943–2020), Member of Parliament for constituency Tangail-4
- Syed Mohammad Aslam Talukder Manna [Elenga] (1964–2008), film actor and producer
- Mohammad Hasan Imam Khan Sohel Hazari [Chhatihati] (born 1973), politician
- Nares Chandra Sen-Gupta (1882–1964), novelist
- Kanailal Niyogi (1924–1961), railway worker and language activist
- Samir Talukder Apurbo (Born in 2010, Kalihati Upazila) a youth programmer and editor of ck news bangladesh.

== See also ==
- Kalihati Town
- Upazilas of Bangladesh
- Districts of Bangladesh
- Divisions of Bangladesh
