= Mohera Zamindar Bari =

Palace in Tangail district

Coordinates: 24.1626°N 90.0420°E

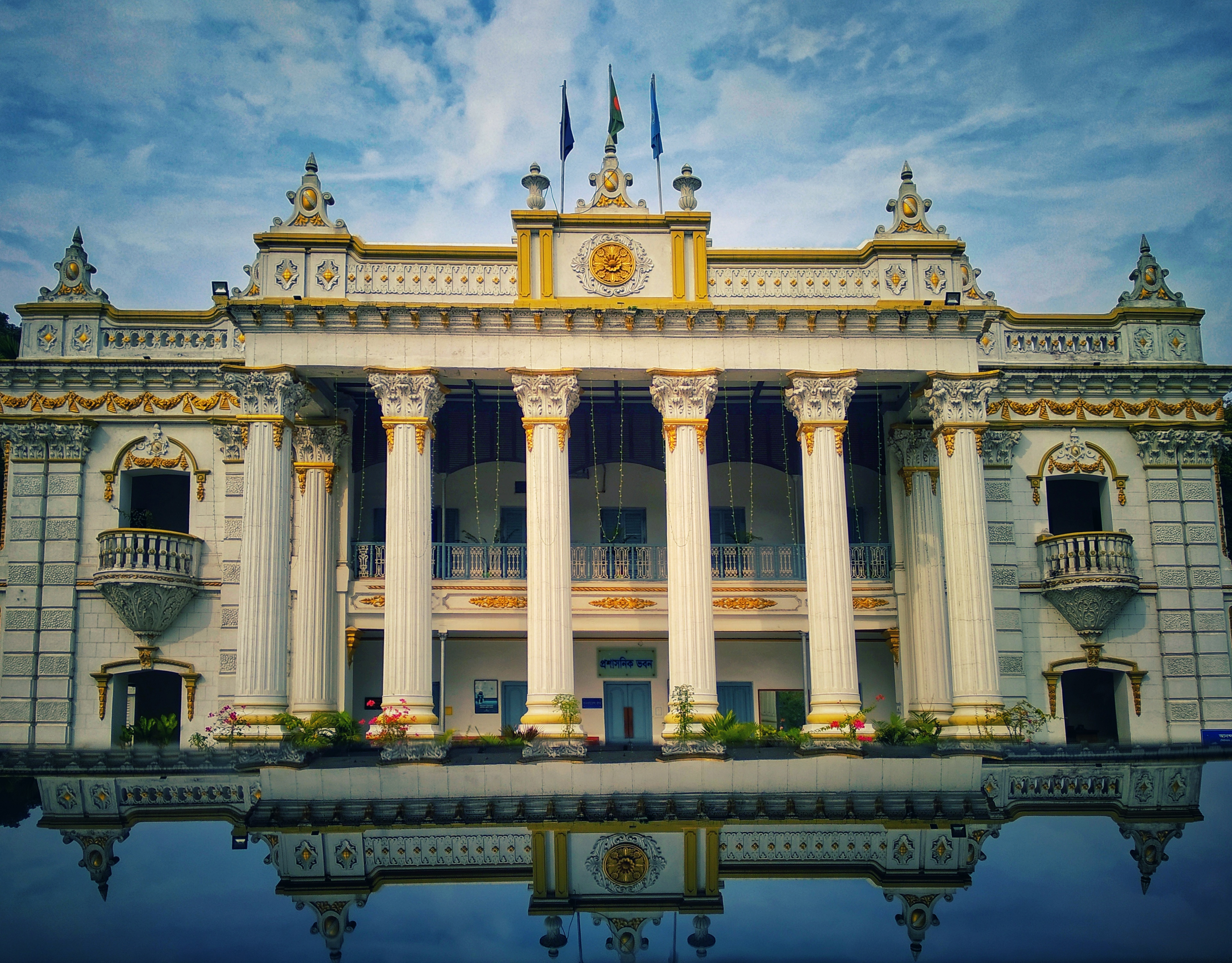
- Mohera Zamindar Bari
- Creation date: 1890

Mohera Zamindar Bari is a 19th-century Zamidari palace in Mirzapur, Tangail District, Bangladesh. The estate was established by a prominent zamindar family who settled in the area prior to the 1890s. Renowned for its architectural grandeur and preservation, Mohera Zamindar Bari is considered one of the best-maintained zamindari estates in Bangladesh. In contemporary times, the property serves a new function as the site of a police training school.

== Location ==
Mohera Zamindar Bari spans an area of approximately eight acres and is situated around 18 km from Tangail Sadar Upazila in the Dhaka Division of Bangladesh. The estate is located along the Dhaka–Tangail Highway, approximately 4 km east of Natiapara Bazar. At the front of the complex lies a large lake named Bishakha Sagar, flanked by two entrance gates that lead into the property. Behind the main building are two additional ponds known as Pasra Pond and Rani Pond, alongside a flower garden.

== History ==
Mohera Zamindar Bari was established in 1890 in Mirzapur Upazila, Tangail District, by two brothers, Kali Charan Saha and Anand Saha. They were two brothers that came to Mohera Village from Calcutta. Originally from Calcutta (present-day Kolkata), they migrated to Mohera village and became prominent zamindars. In addition to managing landholdings across various parts of present-day Bangladesh, the Saha brothers were also engaged in trading activities, particularly in jute and salt. During the Bangladesh war, most of them moved into India, while very few were living at Tangail. Local accounts suggest that the construction of the estate buildings began even before their zamindari was formally established, owing to their considerable wealth. The family was known for their involvement in public welfare and social development within the area.

During the Bangladesh Liberation War in 1971, the estate was attacked by the Pakistan Army, resulting in the deaths of five individuals, including a female member of the zamindar family. Later, the Zamindar family left the country by boat on the river Lohajang. It was here that the Mukti Bahini camp was set up. An initiative was taken to establish this zamindar house as a police training school in 1982. The Police Training School was promoted to a Police Training Centre in 1990.

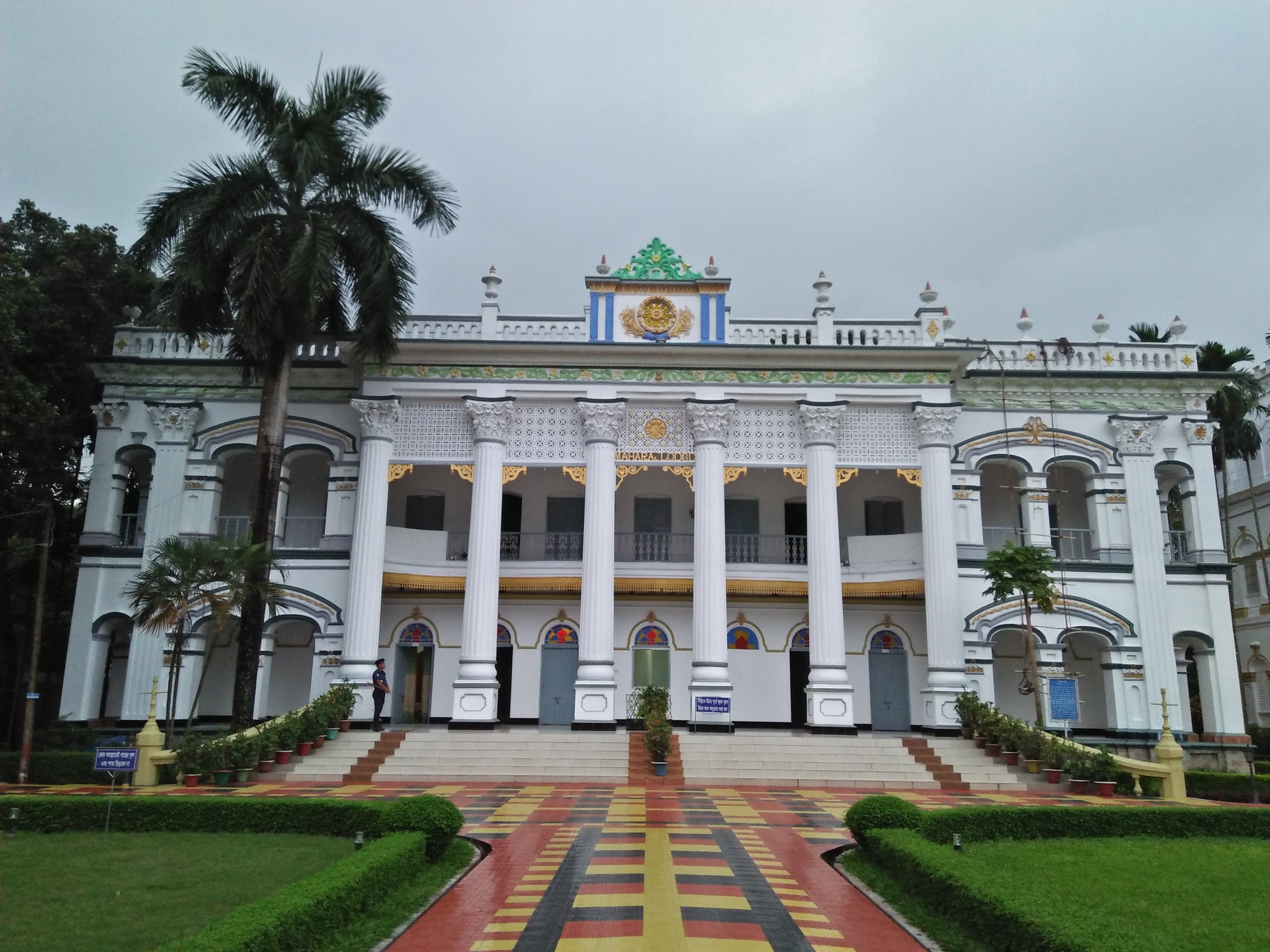
Mohera Zamindar Bari Moharaj Lodge 7

== Other installations ==
Each one of the lodges represents a different architectural style.

Chowdhury Lodge: The pillars of this pink building are built in the style of Romanesque architecture. Inside the building is a corrugated roof. In front of the two-story building is a garden and green field.

Maharaj Lodge: There are six columns in front of the Maharaj Lodge building built in the Byzantine style of architecture. There is a curved railing in front of the pink Maharaja Lodge and a hanging verandah. The building has a total of twelve rooms, with a garden in the front and a tennis court in the back. This building is currently used as a shooting place.

Ananda Lodge: In front of Ananda Lodge, there is a garden with sculptures of deer, tiger and animals which represents British architecture.

Kalicharan Lodge: Built towards the end of the zamindari system, this Kalicharan Lodge is notably different from other buildings. The building is built in the English architecture style.
