= Elenga =

Elenga এলেঙ্গা
- Town
- Location within Bangladesh
- Coordinates: 24°20′19″N 89°55′19″E
- Country: Bangladesh
- Division: Dhaka Division
- District: Tangail District
- Upazila: Kalihati Upazila
- Incorporated: 2018

Government
  - Mayor: Nur Alom Siddiki

Area
  - Total: 23.24 km^{2} (8.97 sq mi)

Population (2011)
  - Total: 55,000
  - Density: 2,400/km^{2} (6,100/sq mi)
- Time zone: UTC+6 (BST)
- Postal code: 1974
- Area code: 9227
- Website: kalihati.tangail.gov.bd

Elenga Municipality mahallah geocode map

Elenga (Bengali: এলেঙ্গা) is a town in Kalihati Upazila of Tangail District, Bangladesh. The town is situated 10 kilometres (6.2 mi) away from Tangail city and 105 kilometres (65 mi) northwest of Dhaka city, the capital.

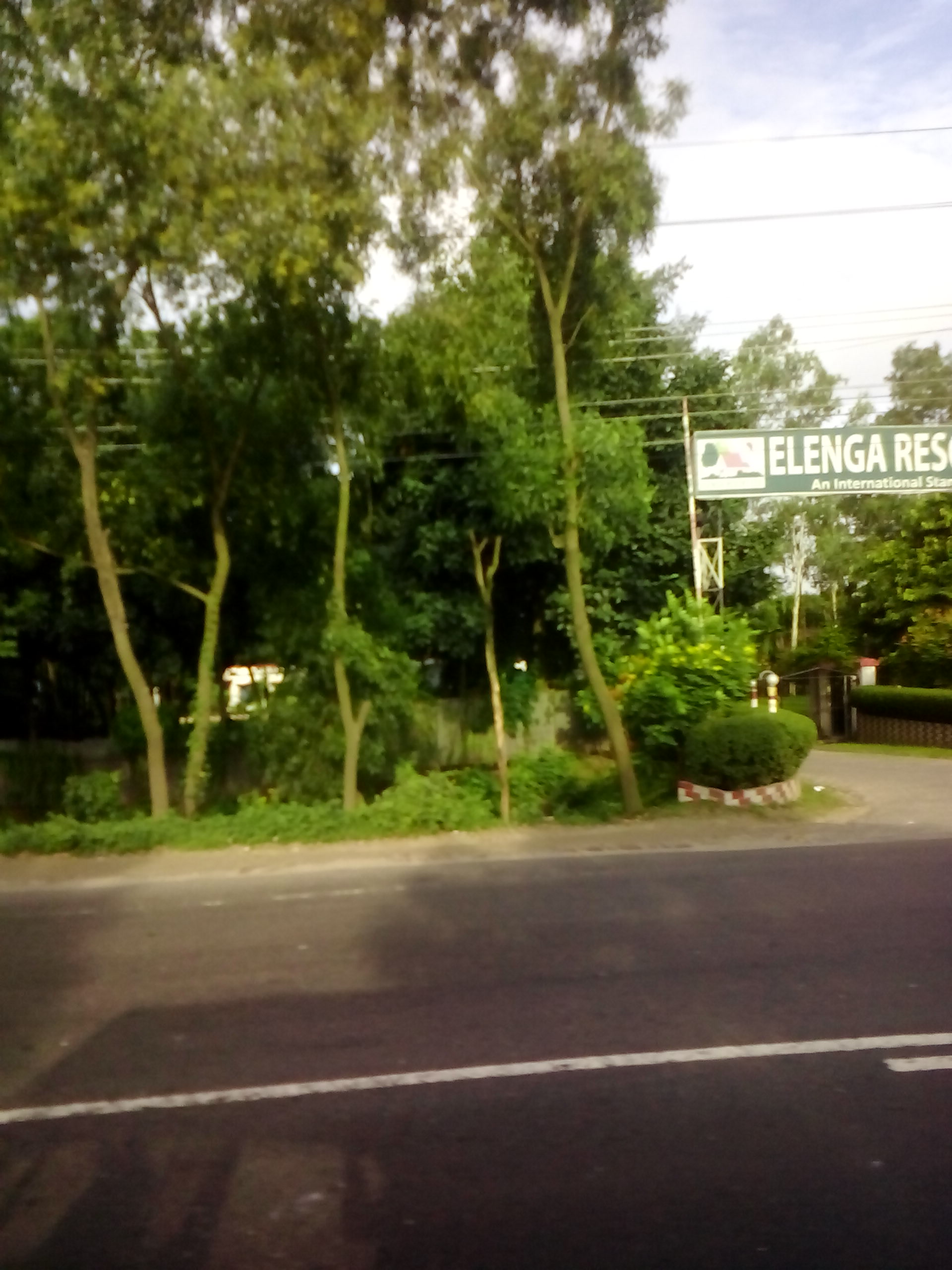
Elenga Resort, Tangail

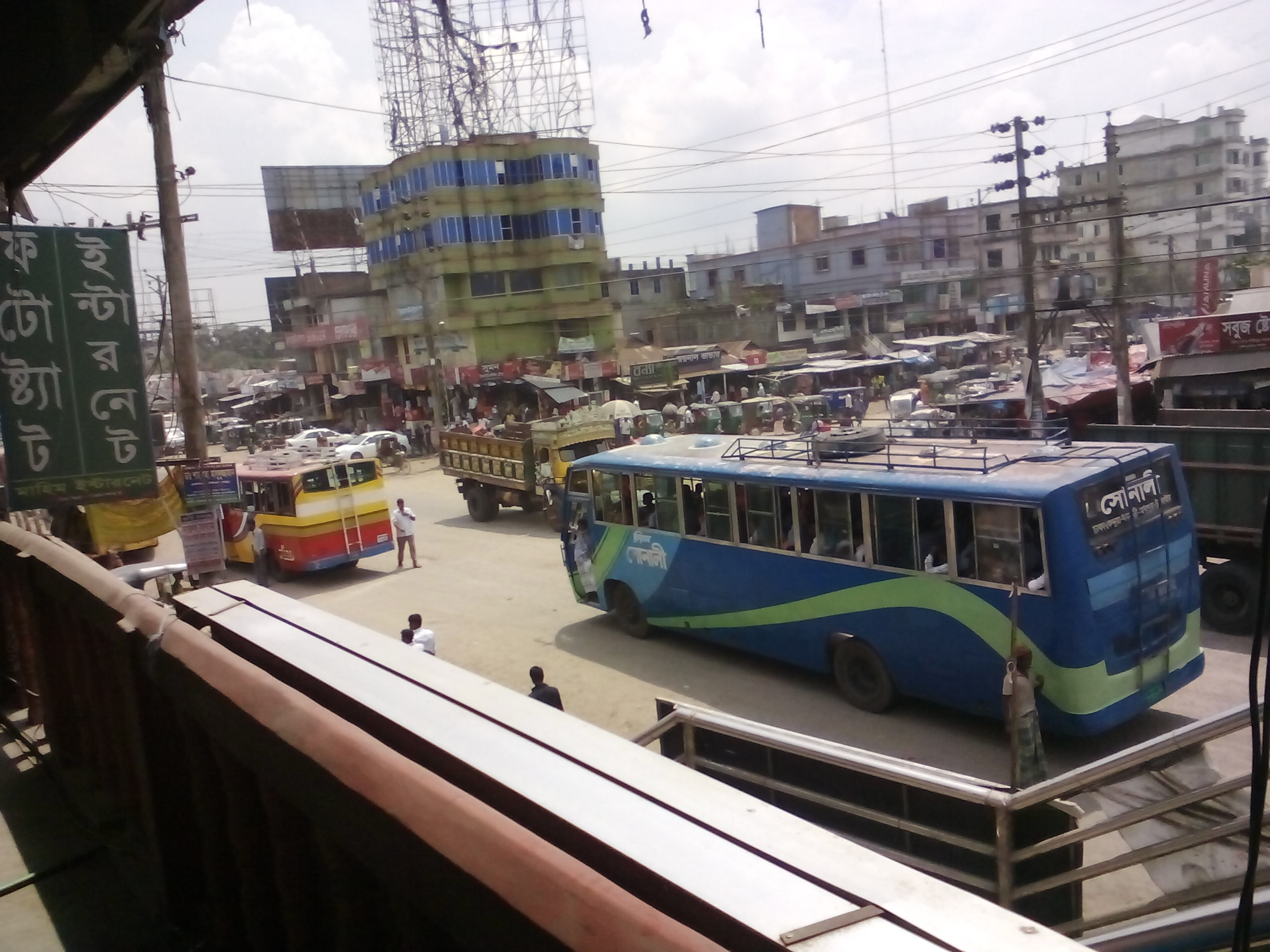
Elenga Bus Stand a busy place of Elenga Municipality.

== Geography ==
According to geographical area Elenga Municipality is situated 10 kilometres (6.2 mi) north-east from Tangail District headquarters. There is a river called Lowhajong is following near west side of Elenga Municipality.

== Demographics ==
The total population of Elenga Municipality is 55000. Among them 26,950 are male and 28050 are female. Total voter number: 27,329 Man voter: 13,329 Woman voter: 14,000

== Administration ==
Ward No.	Region Name
01	DEWLIA BARI, Bhabla, Sherpur
02	Chandra Patal, Rouha, Hakimpur, Rajabari
03	Fultala, Bhangabari, Mirpur
04	Kurighuria, Hayatpur, Hijuli, Chakrahnathpur, Pathailkandi
05	Bashi
06	Moshajan, Baniabari, Elenga, Maheshpur
07	Masinda, Chechua, Chinamura
08	Saruppur, Hinnaipara, Pouli
09	Mahela

Shafi Khan was elected the first mayor of Elenga Municipality on 28 March 2013. Nur Alam Siddiqui was elected mayor on March 29, 2018.

== Education ==
The education system of Elenga Municipality is more advanced. For doing study here there are primary schools, high schools, higher secondary schools and for technical study there are also institutions.

- Government Shamsul Hoque College, Elenga
- Lutfar Rahman Motin Mohila College, Rajabari
- Government Elenga High School, Elenga
- Jitendra Bala Girls High School, Elenga
- Elenga Govt. Primary School
- Rajabari Govt. Primary School

== Notable residents ==
- Syed-Talukder family of Elenga
  - Syed Mohammad Aslam Talukder Manna (1964–2008), film actor and producer
- Bhattacharya family of Elenga
  - Debesh Bhattacharya (1914–2004), jurist
  - Debapriya Bhattacharya (born 1956), economist, Research fellow of CPD

== Points of interest ==
- Elenga Resort
- Elenga Old Landlord House
- Fultala Ashrafia Jame Mosque
- Bismilla Horti Culture, Fultala
- Temple of Rouha Sutradhar Para
- Rajabari LP Gas Field
- Elenga High School
