= Bhatgram Union =

Bhatgram Union ভাতগ্রাম ইউনিয়ন
- Location of Bhatgram Union in Bangladesh
- Coordinates: 24.0938273°N 90.0572491°E
- Country: Bangladesh
- Division: Dhaka Division
- District: Tangail District
- Upazila: Mirzapur Upazila
- Established on: 1984

Government
  - Type: Union Council

Area
  - Total: 19.77 km^{2} (7.63 sq mi)
- Elevation: 12 m (39 ft)

Population (2011)
  - Total: 21,869
  - Density: 1,106/km^{2} (2,865/sq mi)
- Time zone: UTC+6 (BST)
- Postal code: 1942
- Website: bhatgramup.tangail.gov.bd

Bhatgram Union (Bengali: ভাতগ্রাম ইউনিয়ন) is a union of Mirzapur Upazila, Tangail District, Bangladesh. It is situated 4 km west of Mirzapur and 32 km southeast of Tangail, the district's headquarters.

== Demographics ==
According to Population Census 2011 performed by the Bangladesh Bureau of Statistics, the total population of Bhatgram Union is 21,869. There are 5,102 households in total.

== Education ==
The literacy rate in Bhatgram Union is 54.5% (Male - 58.9%, Female - 50.6%).

== See also ==
- Union Councils of Tangail District
