= Sit Mamudpur =

Coordinates: 24.146535°N 90.140360°E

Sit Mamudpur is a village in Bangladesh. This village is in Tarafpur Union, Mirzapur Upazila, Tangail District. There is a High School in the Village, Sit Mamudpur High School.
