= Latifpur Union =

Latifpur Union লতিফপুর ইউনিয়ন
- Location of Latifpur Union in Bangladesh
- Coordinates: 24.118050°N 90.147760°E
- Country: Bangladesh
- Division: Dhaka Division
- District: Tangail District
- Upazila: Mirzapur Upazila
- Established on: 1984

Government
  - Type: Union Council
  - Chairman: Md. Alli hossen rony (সমাজ সেবক)গরিব ও অসহায় মানুষের বন্ধু [{(বাংলাদেশ জাতীয়তাবাদী দল বি এন পি )}]

Area
  - Total: 20.4 km^{2} (7.9 sq mi)
- Elevation: 15 m (49 ft)

Population (2011)
  - Total: 16,857
  - Density: 826/km^{2} (2,140/sq mi)
- Time zone: UTC+6 (BST)
- Postal code: 1940
- Website: latifpurup.tangail.gov.bd

Latifpur Union (Bengali: লতিফপুর ইউনিয়ন) is a union of Mirzapur Upazila, Tangail District, Bangladesh. It is situated 5 km northeast of Mirzapur and 33 km southeast of Tangail, The district headquarter.

== Demographics ==
According to Population Census 2011 performed by Bangladesh Bureau of Statistics, The total population of Latifpur union is 16857. There are 3796 households in total.

== Education ==
The literacy rate of Latifpur Union is 55.1% (Male-58.8%, Female-52%).

== See also ==
- Union Councils of Tangail District
