= Bahuria Union =

Bahuria Union বহুরিয়া ইউনিয়ন
- Location of Bahuria Union in Bangladesh
- Coordinates: 24.17905674°N 90.1761353°E
- Country: Bangladesh
- Division: Dhaka Division
- District: Tangail District
- Upazila: Mirzapur Upazila
- Established on: 1984

Government
  - Type: Union Council
  - Chairman: Abdus Samad (Bangladesh Nationalist Party)

Area
  - Total: 20.92 km^{2} (8.08 sq mi)
- Elevation: 23 m (75 ft)

Population (2011)
  - Total: 21,404
  - Density: 1,023/km^{2} (2,650/sq mi)
- Time zone: UTC+6 (BST)
- Postal code: 1940
- Website: Official Website of Bahuria Union

Bahuria Union (Bengali:বহুরিয়া ইউনিয়ন) is a union of Mirzapur Upazila, Tangail District, Bangladesh. It is situated 11 km north of Mirzapur and 38 km southeast of Tangail, The district headquarter.

== Demographics ==
According to Population Census 2011 performed by Bangladesh Bureau of Statistics, The total population of Bahuria union is 21404. There are 4985 households in total.

== Education ==
The literacy rate of Bahuria Union is 52.2% (Male-55.7%, Female-49.1%).

== See also ==
- Union Councils of Tangail District
