= Jamurki Union =

Jamurki Union জামুর্কি ইউনিয়ন
- Location of Jamurki Union in Bangladesh
- Coordinates: 24.146345°N 90.020159°E
- Country: Bangladesh
- Division: Dhaka Division
- District: Tangail District
- Upazila: Mirzapur Upazila
- Established: 1984

Government
  - Type: Union Council

Area
  - Total: 21.1 km^{2} (8.1 sq mi)
- Elevation: 15 m (49 ft)

Population (2011)
  - Total: 33,493
  - Density: 1,590/km^{2} (4,110/sq mi)
- Time zone: UTC+6 (BST)
- Postal code: 1944
- Website: Official Website of Jamurki Union

Jamurki Union (Bengali: জামুর্কি ইউনিয়ন) is a union of Mirzapur Upazila, Tangail District, Bangladesh. It is situated 12.4 kilometres (7.7 mi) northwest of Mirzapur and 18 kilometres (11 mi) southeast of Tangail, the district headquarters.

== Demographics ==
According to the 2011 Bangladesh census, Jamurki Union had 7,810 households and a population of 33,493. The literacy rate (age 7 and over) was 57.7% (male: 60%, female: 55.5%).

== See also ==
- Union Councils of Tangail District
