= Warshi Union =

Warshi Union ওয়ার্শী ইউনিয়ন
- Location of Warshi Union in Bangladesh
- Coordinates: 24.040812°N 90.023870°E
- Country: Bangladesh
- Division: Dhaka Division
- District: Tangail District
- Upazila: Mirzapur Upazila
- Established on: 1984

Government
  - Type: Union Council

Area
  - Total: 27.8 km^{2} (10.7 sq mi)
- Elevation: 15 m (49 ft)

Population (2011)
  - Total: 27,611
  - Density: 993/km^{2} (2,570/sq mi)
- Time zone: UTC+6 (BST)
- Postal code: 1940
- Website: Official Website of Warshi Union

Warshi Union (Bengali: ওয়ার্শী ইউনিয়ন) is a union of Mirzapur Upazila, Tangail District, Bangladesh. It is situated 10.5 km south of Mirzapur and 38.5 km southeast of Tangail, the district headquarters.

In the centre of the village is Warshi Natpukur, also known by its old name "Warshi Noulapukur". This is the place where all kind of cultural programmes are arranged by the village people.

== Demographics ==
According to the 2011 Population Census performed by the Bangladesh Bureau of Statistics, the total population of Warshi union is 27,611. There are 6,456 households in total.

== Education ==
The literacy rate of Warshi Union is 59.8% (male – 63.9%, female – 56.3%).

== See also ==
- Union Councils of Tangail District
