= Gorai Union =

Gorai Union গোড়াই10নংইউনিয়ন
- Location of Gorai Union in Bangladesh
- Coordinates: 24.099361°N 90.159205°E
- Country: Bangladesh
- Division: Dhaka Division
- District: Tangail District
- Upazila: Mirzapur Upazila
- Established: 1984

Government
  - Type: Union Council

Area
  - Total: 29.55 km^{2} (11.41 sq mi)
- Elevation: 16 m (52 ft)

Population (2011)
  - Total: 57,897
  - Density: 1,959/km^{2} (5,075/sq mi)
- Time zone: UTC+6 (BST)
- Postal code: 1941
- Area code: jahidমুজাপুর
- Website: goraiup.tangail.gov.bd

Gorai Union (Bengali: গোড়াই ইউনিয়ন) is a union of Mirzapur Upazila, Tangail District, Bangladesh. It is situated 6.7 kilometres (4.2 mi) east of Mirzapur and 33 kilometres (21 mi) southeast of Tangail.

== Demographics ==
According to the 2011 Bangladesh census, Gorai Union had 14,397 households and a population of 57,897. The literacy rate (age 7 and over) was 59.4% (male: 64.1%, female: 54.8%).

== See also ==
- Union Councils of Tangail District
