= Bhaora Union =

Bhaora Union ভাওড়া ইউনিয়ন
- Location of Bhaora Union in Bangladesh
- Coordinates: 24.11070147°N 90.10500312°E
- Country: Bangladesh
- Division: Dhaka Division
- District: Tangail District
- Upazila: Mirzapur Upazila
- Established on: 1984

Government
  - Type: Union Council
  - Chairman: Md. Amzad Hossain (Bangladesh Awami League)

Area
  - Total: 14.4 km^{2} (5.6 sq mi)
- Elevation: 10 m (33 ft)

Population (2011)
  - Total: 17,872
  - Density: 1,240/km^{2} (3,210/sq mi)
- Time zone: UTC+6 (BST)
- Postal code: 1940
- Website: Official Website of Bhaora Union

Bhaora Union (Bengali: ভাওড়া ইউনিয়ন) is a union of Mirzapur Upazila, Tangail District, Bangladesh. It is situated 3 km north of Mirzapur and 26 km southeast of Tangail, The district headquarter.

== Demographics ==
According to Population Census 2011 performed by Bangladesh Bureau of Statistics, The total population of Bhaora union is 17872. There are 4123 households in total.

== Education ==
The literacy rate of Bhaora Union is 61.5% (Male-65.6%, Female-57.9%).

== See also ==
- Union Councils of Tangail District
