= Banail Union =

Banail Union বানাইল ইউনিয়ন
- Location of Banail Union in Bangladesh
- Coordinates: 24.0954°N 89.9993°E
- Country: Bangladesh
- Division: Dhaka Division
- District: Tangail District
- Upazila: Mirzapur Upazila
- Established on: 1984

Government
  - Type: Union Council

Area
  - Total: 20.92 km^{2} (8.08 sq mi)
- Elevation: 14 m (46 ft)

Population (2011)
  - Total: 23,408
  - Density: 1,119/km^{2} (2,898/sq mi)
- Time zone: UTC+6 (BST)
- Postal code: 1944
- Website: banailup.tangail.gov.bd

Banail Union (Bengali: বানাইল ইউনিয়ন) is a union of Mirzapur Upazila, Tangail District, Bangladesh. It is situated 19 km west of Mirzapur and 38 km southeast of Tangail, the district headquarters.

== Demographics ==
According to Population Census 2011 performed by Bangladesh Bureau of Statistics, The total population of Banail union is 23408. There are 5291 households in total.

== Education ==
The literacy rate of Banail Union is 58.3% (Male-61.6%, Female-55.4%).

== See also ==
- Union Councils of Tangail District
