= Mamudpur (disambiguation) =

Mamudpur is a village in Srirampore subdivision of Hooghly district, West Bengal, India.

It can also refer to:

- Mamudpur, Arambagh, a village in Arambagh subdivision of Hooghly district, West Bengal, India
- Sit Mamudpur, a village in Mirzapur Upazila in Tangail District, Bangladesh
