= Banshtail Union =

Banshtail Union বাঁশতৈল ইউনিয়ন
- Location of Banshtail Union in Bangladesh
- Coordinates: 24.12247192°N 90.18233657°E
- Country: Bangladesh
- Division: Dhaka Division
- District: Tangail District
- Upazila: Mirzapur Upazila
- Established on: 1984

Government
  - Type: Union Council

Area
  - Total: 48.5 km^{2} (18.7 sq mi)
- Elevation: 19 m (62 ft)

Population (2011)
  - Total: 29,781
  - Density: 614/km^{2} (1,590/sq mi)
- Time zone: UTC+6 (BST)
- Postal code: 1944
- Website: bastailup.tangail.gov.bd

Banshtail Union (Bengali: বাঁশতৈল ইউনিয়ন) is a union parishad of Mirzapur Upazila, Tangail District, Bangladesh. It is situated 17 km east of Mirzapur and 46 km east of Tangail, The district headquarters.

== Demographics ==
According to the 2011 Bangladesh census, Banshtail Union had 6,897 households and a population of 29,781.

== Education ==
The literacy rate of Banshtail Union is 58.3% (Male-61.6%, Female-55.4%).

== See also ==
- Union Councils of Tangail District
