= Anaitara Union =

Anaitara Union আনাইতারা ইউনিয়ন
- Location of Anaitara Union in Bangladesh
- Coordinates: 24.07583426°N 90.01353443°E
- Country: Bangladesh
- Division: Dhaka Division
- District: Tangail District
- Upazila: Mirzapur Upazila
- Established: 1984

Government
  - Type: Union Council

Area
  - Total: 24.62 km^{2} (9.51 sq mi)
- Elevation: 14 m (46 ft)

Population (2011)
  - Total: 24,912
  - Density: 1,012/km^{2} (2,621/sq mi)
- Time zone: UTC+6 (BST)
- Postal code: 1944
- Website: Official Website of Anaitara Union

Anaitara Union (Bengali: আনাইতারা ইউনিয়ন) is a union of Mirzapur Upazila, Tangail District, Bangladesh. It is situated 15 kilometres (9.3 mi) southwest of Mirzapur and 42 kilometres (26 mi) southeast of Tangail, the district headquarters.

== Demographics ==
According to the 2011 Bangladesh census, Anaitara Union had 5,657 households and a population of 24,912. The literacy rate (age 7 and over) was 53.5% (male: 58.2%, female: 49.6%).

== See also ==
- Union Councils of Tangail District
