= Machain Shahi Mosque =

Mosque in Harirampur, Manikganj, Dhaka, Bangladesh

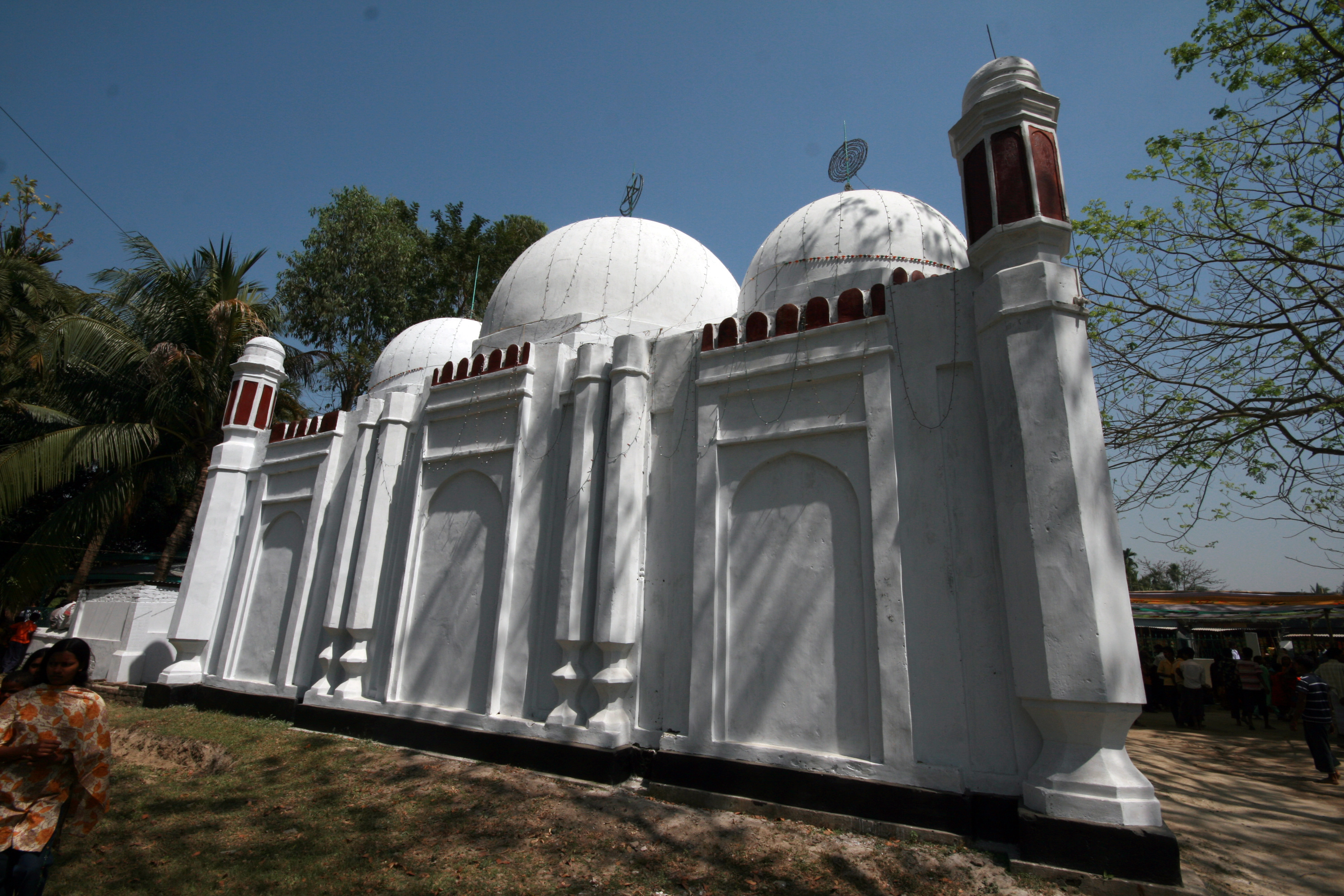
- Machain Mosque in 2009. Three mihrabs on the west wall, the dome, and two corner minarets are visible.

Religion
- Affiliation: Islam
- District: Manikganj District
- Ownership: Department of Archaeology
- Year consecrated: 1501
- Status: Active

Location
- Location: Machain, Harirampur Upazila
- Country: Bangladesh
- Interactive map of Machain Shahi Mosque
- Coordinates: 23°46′42.9″N 89°51′12.2″E

Architecture
- Style: Sultanate period style
- Founder: Alauddin Husain Shah
- Funded by: Alauddin Husain Shah
- Established: 1501; 525 years ago

Specifications
- Dome: 3
- Minaret: 4
- Shrine: 1
- Materials: Lime, surki and white cement
- Department of Archaeology preserved monument ID: BD-C-33-57

Machain Shahi Mosque (Bengali: মাচাইন শাহী মসজিদ) is a medieval Jami mosque established in 1501. Built in the Sultanate period architectural style, the mosque is located in Machain village on the banks of the Ichamati River in Balla Union, Harirampur Upazila, about 25 km from Manikganj town. The mosque is associated with the shrine of Shah Rustam Baghdadi. The three-domed structure has remained active for prayer since its establishment. Due to renovations over time, the mosque’s dimensions have increased. It is a preserved monument under the Department of Archaeology (Bangladesh).

== History ==
Machain Mosque was built in the late 1501 during the Bengal Sultanate on the banks of the Ichamati River in present-day Manikganj District. The mosque was constructed by Alauddin Husain Shah for the Sufi saint Shah Rustam Baghdadi to propagate Islam.

Shah Rustam Baghdadi was a companion of Shah Jalal and came to Machain to spread Islam. He used to meditate and perform worship on a bamboo platform in the river. At that time, the Sultan of Bengal was Alauddin Husain Shah. While traveling by river, the Sultan saw Baghdadi praying on the platform in the middle of the river. When the Sultan’s soldiers asked the name of the area, Baghdadi, not understanding them, replied “Machan.” Since then, the area became known as Machan, later Machain. The Sultan halted his journey to meet Baghdadi. Impressed by Baghdadi’s preaching and spiritual influence, the Sultan ordered the mosque to be built in his honor.

On 12 September 2005, the mosque was listed as a preserved monument by the Department of Archaeology, and on 13 October the same year it was notified in the Bangladesh Gazette. Renovation took place in 2019.

== Architecture ==
The main construction materials of Machain Mosque were lime, surki, and white cement. Following Sultanate period Islamic architecture, it was built in a rectangular plan. The mosque has three domes: the central dome is larger, flanked by two smaller domes. Each dome has fine carved ornamentation at its base. The walls are decorated with designs and carvings.

The west wall has three mihrabs. The mosque has three entrances; the east wall features arches (khilans), and one entrance each on the north and south sides. Aesthetic arrangements of the main entrance and mihrabs are preserved. Four octagonal columns with minarets are placed at the four corners of the rectangular roof. Over time, the mosque was extended eastward.

== Shah Rustam Baghdadi’s Shrine ==
To the north of the mosque is the shrine of Shah Rustam Baghdadi, who came to Machain to spread Islam and established a khanqah there. After his death, he was buried beside the mosque, now known as his shrine. Several centuries-old stones remain preserved there.
