= Ajgana Union =

Ajgana Union আজগানা ইউনিয়ন
- Location of Ajgana Union in Bangladesh
- Coordinates: 24.07063274°N 90.16134292°E
- Country: Bangladesh
- Division: Dhaka Division
- District: Tangail District
- Upazila: Mirzapur Upazila
- Established: 1984

Government
  - Type: Union Council
  - Chairman: Rifat Monouar Sikder (Bangladesh Nationalist Party)

Area
  - Total: 43.6 km^{2} (16.8 sq mi)
- Elevation: 11 m (36 ft)

Population (2011)
  - Total: 32,949
  - Density: 756/km^{2} (1,960/sq mi)
- Time zone: UTC+6 (BST)
- Postal code: 1942
- Website: Official Website of Ajgana Union

Ajgana Union (Bengali: আজগানা ইউনিয়ন) is a union of Mirzapur Upazila, Tangail District, Bangladesh. It is situated 12 kilometres (7.5 mi) southeast of Mirzapur and 41 kilometres (25 mi) southeast of Tangail, the district headquarters.

== Demographics ==
According to the 2011 Bangladesh census, Ajgana Union had 7,463 households and a population of 32,949. The literacy rate (age 7 and over) was 51.2% (male: 54.5%, female: 48%).

== See also ==
- Union Councils of Tangail District
