= Fatepur Union (Mirzapur) =

Fatepur Union ফতেপুর ইউনিয়ন
- Location of Fatepur Union in Bangladesh
- Coordinates: 24.160010°N 90.074715°E
- Country: Bangladesh
- Division: Dhaka Division
- District: Tangail District
- Upazila: Mirzapur Upazila
- Established on: 1984

Government
  - Type: Union Council
  - Chairman: Abdur Rauf Miah

Area
  - Total: 20.06 km^{2} (7.75 sq mi)
- Elevation: 12 m (39 ft)

Population (2011)
  - Total: 20,813
  - Density: 1,038/km^{2} (2,687/sq mi)
- Time zone: UTC+6 (BST)
- Postal code: 1945
- Website: Fatepur Union Official Website

Fatepur Union (Bengali: ফতেপুর ইউনিয়ন) is a union of Mirzapur Upazila, Tangail District, Bangladesh. It is situated 10 km north of Mirzapur and 22 km southeast of Tangail, The district headquarter.

== Demographics ==
According to Population Census 2011 performed by Bangladesh Bureau of Statistics, The total population of Fatehpur union is 20,813. There are 4,880 households in total.

== Education ==
The literacy rate of Fatepur Union is 50.2% (Male-53.5%, Female-47.4%).

== See also ==
- Union Councils of Tangail District
