= Gono Adalat =

Gono Adalat (people's court) was a mock trial held to Bangladesh of those responsible for the 1971 Bangladesh Genocide. It was not an official trial and did not have any legal basis but was widely popular. The Bangladesh Nationalist Party led government filed cases against the organizers of the Gono Adalat which were withdrawn by the next caretaker government. The trial was led by Jahanara Imam.

== History ==
Jahanara Imam and other activists created the Ghatak-Dalal Nirmul Committee on 19 January 1992. The committee campaigned for the trails of collaborators of Pakistan Army who have accused of involvement in the Bangladesh Genocide during the Bangladesh Liberation war in 1971. On 26 March 1992, the Ghatak-Dalal Nirmul Committee established the Gono Adalat to hold public mock trials of the alleged collaborators. The movement began after Ghulam Azam was appointed the head of Bangladesh Jamaat-e-Islami in December 1991. The court tried Ghulam Azam, found him guilty and sentenced him to death. The court held trials in Suhrawardy Udyan, the site of the surrender of Pakistani forces at the end of Bangladesh Liberation war. Former Supreme Court Justice Debesh Bhattacharya was a member of the Gono Adalat.

== Reception ==
The Government of Bangladesh, then formed by Bangladesh Nationalist Party, was against the Gona Adalat. It filed charges against 28 organizers including Jahanara Imam and Shahriar Kabir over the Gono Adalat. The neutral Caretaker Government led by Justice Habibur Rahman withdrew the charges against them in 1995. The Bangladesh Nationalist party was politically aligned with the Islamist Bangladesh Jamaat-e-Islami party. The Gono Adalat had the support of the then opposition party, Awami League.

The verdicts of the Gono Adalat were endorsed by 16 non-governmental organizations. In May 2016, the prosecution of the International Crimes Tribunal (Bangladesh) dedicated a verdict to the founder of Gono Adalat Jahanara Imam.
