= Bir Bashinda Union =

Bir Bashinda Union বীর বাসিন্দা ইউনিয়ন
- Location of Bir Bashinda Union in Bangladesh
- Coordinates: 24.393805°N 90.043703°E
- Country: Bangladesh
- Division: Dhaka Division
- District: Tangail District
- Upazila: Kalihati Upazila
- Established on: 1984

Government
  - Type: Union Council

Area
  - Total: 15.97 km^{2} (6.17 sq mi)
- Elevation: 18 m (59 ft)

Population (2011)
  - Total: 18,637
  - Density: 1,167/km^{2} (3,023/sq mi)
- Time zone: UTC+6 (BST)
- Postal code: 1971
- Website: Official Website of Bir Bashinda Union

Bir Bashinda Union (Bengali: বীর বাসিন্দা ইউনিয়ন) is a union of Kalihati Upazila, Tangail District, Bangladesh. It is situated 26 kilometres (16 mi) northeast of Tangail, the district headquarters.

== Demographics ==
According to Population Census 2011 performed by Bangladesh Bureau of Statistics, The total population of Bir Bashinda union is 18637. There are 4630 households in total.

== Education ==
The literacy rate of Bir Bashinda Union is 60.7% (Male-39.3%, Female-34.4%).

== See also ==
- Union Councils of Tangail District
