= Kalihati =

Kalihati কালিহাতী
- Town
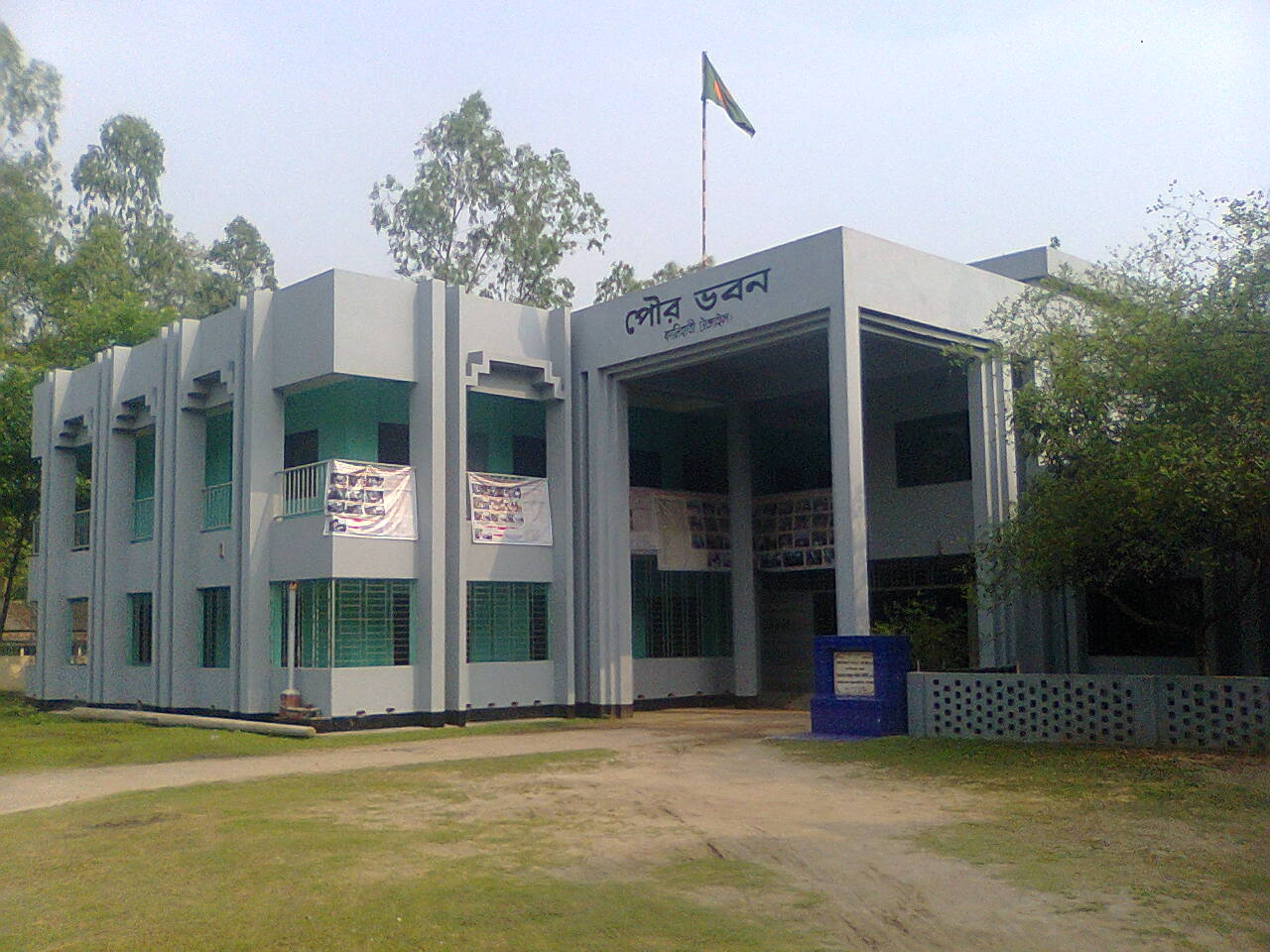
- Kalihati town's administrative office

- Location within Bangladesh
- Coordinates: 24°23′N 89°59′E
- Country: Bangladesh
- Division: Dhaka Division
- District: Tangail District
- Upazila: Kalihati Upazila
- Incorporated: 1998

Government
  - Type: Pourashava
  - Mayor: Ali Akbar (Bangladesh Nationalist Party)

Area
  - Total: 14.52 km^{2} (5.61 sq mi)

Population
  - Total: 37,038
  - Density: 2,551/km^{2} (6,607/sq mi)
- Time zone: UTC+6 (BST)
- Postal codes: 1970
- Area code: 9227
- Website: kalihatipourashava.gov.bd

Kalihati Municipality mahallah geocode map

Kalihati (Bengali: কালিহাতী) is a town of Kalihati Upazila, Tangail, Bangladesh. The town is situated 22 km northeast of Tangail city and 102 km northwest of Dhaka city, the capital of Bangladesh.

== Demographics ==
According to Population Census 2011 performed by Bangladesh Bureau of Statistics, The total population of Kalihati town is 37,038. There are 8,731 households in total.

== Education ==
The literacy rate of Kalihati town is 53.4% (Male-58.4%, Female-48.3%). There is a textile engineering college called Bangabandhu Textile Engineering College in the town. A pre cadet school is also a part of the town according to data from Google Maps.

== See also ==
- Mirzapur, Bangladesh
- Dhanbari
