= Paikara Union =

Paikara Union পাইকাড়া ইউনিয়ন
- Location of Paikara Union in Bangladesh
- Coordinates: 24.342417°N 90.046719°E
- Country: Bangladesh
- Division: Dhaka Division
- District: Tangail District
- Upazila: Kalihati Upazila
- Established on: 1984

Government
  - Type: Union Council
  - Chairman: Azad Hossain (Bangladesh Awami League)

Area
  - Total: 19.41 km^{2} (7.49 sq mi)
- Elevation: 16 m (52 ft)

Population (2011)
  - Total: 28,852
  - Density: 1,486/km^{2} (3,850/sq mi)
- Time zone: UTC+6 (BST)
- Postal code: 1973
- Website: Official Website of Paikara Union

Paikara Union (Bengali: পাইকাড়া ইউনিয়ন) is a union of Kalihati Upazila, Tangail District, Bangladesh. It is situated 10 km northeast of Tangail, The district headquarter.

== Demographics ==
According to Population Census 2011 performed by Bangladesh Bureau of Statistics, The total population of Paikara union is 28852. There are 7401 households in total.

== Education ==
The literacy rate of Paikara Union is 39.2% (Male-41.5%, Female-37.1%).

Paikara M.U High School

*Paikara Govt. Primary School

- Kaloha Govt. Primary School.
- 67No. Gopal Dighi Govt. Primary School.
- Gopal Dighi K.P. Union High School.

== See also ==
- Union Councils of Tangail District
