= Nagbari Union =

Nagbari Union নাগবাড়ী ইউনিয়ন
- Location of Nagbari Union in Bangladesh
- Coordinates: 24.342417°N 90.046719°E
- Country: Bangladesh
- Division: Dhaka Division
- District: Tangail District
- Upazila: Kalihati Upazila
- Established on: 1984

Government
  - Type: Union Council
  - Chairman: Maksudur Rahman Siddiqui Milton (Bangladesh Awami League)

Area
  - Total: 25.13 km^{2} (9.70 sq mi)
- Elevation: 16 m (52 ft)

Population (2011)
  - Total: 31,294
  - Density: 1,245/km^{2} (3,225/sq mi)
- Time zone: UTC+6 (BST)
- Postal code: 1972
- Website: Official Website of Nagbari Union

Nagbari Union (Bengali: নাগবাড়ী ইউনিয়ন) is a union of Kalihati Upazila, Tangail District, Bangladesh. It is situated 22 km north of Tangail on the bank of the Bangshai River.

== Demographics ==
According to Population Census 2011 performed by Bangladesh Bureau of Statistics, The total population of Nagbari union is 31294. There are 7866 households in total.

== Education ==
The literacy rate of Nagbari Union is 39.6% (Male-43.7%, Female-35.9%).

== See also ==
- Union Councils of Tangail District
