= Mirza Mazharul Islam =

Bangladeshi surgeon and language movement veteran (1927–2020)

- মির্জা মাজহারুল ইসলাম
- Born: 1 January 1927; Tangail, Bengal Presidency, British India
- Died: 11 October 2020 (aged 93); Dhaka, Bangladesh
- Education: Ripon College, Calcutta; Dacca Medical College
- Occupation: surgeon
- Relatives: Mirza Nurul Huda (uncle)
- Awards: Ekushey Padak (2018)

Mirza Mazharul Islam (1 January 1927 – 11 October 2020) was a Bangladeshi surgeon and language movement veteran.

== Early life and education ==
Mirza Mazharul Islam was born on 1 January 1927 to a Bengali family of Muslim Mirzas in the village of Aghacharan, Kalihati in Tangail, then part of the Mymensingh district of the Bengal Presidency (now in Bangladesh). His father Mirza Helaluddin was an employee of two British companies David & Company and Landel and Clark. His paternal grandfather Mirza Mahtabuddin Beg, through whom he traces his Central Asian ancestry, was a deputy police superintendent nominated by the British Raj. His mother, Chhanda Khatun of Jangalia, Delduar, was a housewife and Islam's maternal uncle Mirza Nurul Huda was a former Vice President of Bangladesh. He was also a relative of Abu Sayeed Chowdhury, a former President of Bangladesh.

Islam studied at the pathshala of Manmohan Babu in Balla Bazar, and also completed maktab studies locally. He received a scholarship in class four and proceeded into class five, and enrolled at the Balla Coronation High English School. He belonged to the first batch of students at both the Balla Coronation High English School and the Dacca Medical College. He passed his ISC from Ripon College, Calcutta in 1946 and his MBBS from Dacca Medical College in 1952. Other than that, he also travelled to the United Kingdom in 1963 for higher studies.

== Career ==
Islam was the chief consultant at the Department of Surgery in BIRDEM. In recognition of his contribution to the Bengali language movement, the government of Bangladesh awarded him the country's second highest civilian award Ekushey Padak in 2018.

Islam died from COVID-19 complications on 11 October 2020 at BIRDEM Hospital in Dhaka.

== Death ==
Islam died from COVID-19 complications on 11 October 2020 at BIRDEM Hospital in Dhaka.
