= Gohaliabari Union =

Gohaliabari Union গোহালিয়াবাড়ী ইউনিয়ন
- Location of Gohaliabari Union in Bangladesh
- Coordinates: 24.393372°N 89.844726°E
- Country: Bangladesh
- Division: Dhaka Division
- District: Tangail District
- Upazila: Kalihati Upazila
- Established on: 1984

Government
  - Type: Union Council
  - Chairman: Hazrat Ali (Bangladesh Awami League)

Area
  - Total: 36.32 km^{2} (14.02 sq mi)
- Elevation: 13 m (43 ft)

Population (2011)
  - Total: 23,824
  - Density: 655.9/km^{2} (1,699/sq mi)
- Time zone: UTC+6 (BST)
- Postal code: 1970
- Website: gohaliabariup.tangail.gov.bd

Gohaliabari Union (Bengali: গোহালিয়াবাড়ী ইউনিয়ন) is a union of Kalihati Upazila, Tangail District, Bangladesh. It is situated 30 km north of Tangail, The District Headquarter.

== Demographics ==
According to the 2011 Bangladesh census, Gohaliabari Union had 5,062 households and a population of 23,824.

The literacy rate (age 7 and over) was 40.2% (Male-44.4%, Female-36%).

== See also ==
- Union Councils of Tangail District
