= Mohera Union =

Mohera Union মহেড়া ইউনিয়ন
- Location of Mohera Union in Bangladesh
- Coordinates: 24.099361°N 90.159205°E
- Country: Bangladesh
- Division: Dhaka Division
- District: Tangail District
- Upazila: Mirzapur Upazila
- Established on: 1984

Government
  - Type: Union Council

Area
  - Total: 17.86 km^{2} (6.90 sq mi)
- Elevation: 14 m (46 ft)

Population (2011)
  - Total: 27,144
  - Density: 1,520/km^{2} (3,936/sq mi)
- Time zone: UTC+6 (BST)
- Postal code: 1945
- Website: moheraup.tangail.gov.bd

Mohera Union (Bengali: মহেড়া ইউনিয়ন) is a union of Mirzapur Upazila, Tangail District, Bangladesh. It is situated 12 kilometres (7.5 mi) northwest of Mirzapur and 18 kilometres (11 mi) southeast of Tangail.

== Demographics ==
According to the population census in 2011 performed by Bangladesh Bureau of Statistics, the total population of Mohera union was 27,144, in 5,816 households.

== Education ==
The literacy rate of Mohera Union in 2011 was 56.8% (male 62.2%, female 51.5%).

== See also ==
- Union council (Bangladesh)
