= Tarafpur Union =

Tarafpur Union তরফপুর ইউনিয়ন
- Location of Tarafpur Union in Bangladesh
- Coordinates: 24.157979°N 90.112797°E
- Country: Bangladesh
- Division: Dhaka Division
- District: Tangail District
- Upazila: Mirzapur Upazila
- Established on: 1984

Government
  - Type: Union Council
  - Chairman: Sayeed Anwar (Bangladesh Nationalist Party)

Area
  - Total: 26.3 km^{2} (10.2 sq mi)
- Elevation: 15 m (49 ft)

Population (2011)
  - Total: 23,169
  - Density: 881/km^{2} (2,280/sq mi)
- Time zone: UTC+6 (BST)
- Postal code: 1940
- Website: Official Website of Tarafpur Union

Tarafpur Union (Bengali: তরফপুর ইউনিয়ন) is a union of Mirzapur Upazila, Tangail District, Bangladesh. It is situated 21 km north of Mirzapur and 52 km southeast of Tangail, The district headquarter.

== Demographics ==
According to Population Census 2011 performed by Bangladesh Bureau of Statistics, The total population of Tarafpur union is 23169. There are 5168 households in total.

== Education ==
The literacy rate of Tarafpur Union is 47.3% (Male-50.6%, Female-44.4%).

== See also ==
- Union Councils of Tangail District
