= Durgapur Union, Kalihati =

Durgapur Union দুর্গাপুর ইউনিয়ন
- Location of Durgapur Union in Bangladesh
- Coordinates: 24.364156°N 89.830168°E
- Country: Bangladesh
- Division: Dhaka Division
- District: Tangail District
- Upazila: Kalihati Upazila
- Established on: 1984

Government
  - Type: Union Council
  - Chairman: Anwar Hossain (Bangladesh Awami League)

Area
  - Total: 16.02 km^{2} (6.19 sq mi)
- Elevation: 13 m (43 ft)

Population (2011)
  - Total: 18,573
  - Density: 1,159/km^{2} (3,003/sq mi)
- Time zone: UTC+6 (BST)
- Postal code: 1970
- Website: Official Website of Durgapur Union

Durgapur Union (Bengali: দুর্গাপুর ইউনিয়ন) is a union of Kalihati Upazila, Tangail District, Bangladesh. It is situated 21 km north of Tangail, The District Headquarter.

== Demographics ==
According to Population Census 2011 performed by Bangladesh Bureau of Statistics, The total population of Durgapur union is 18573. There are 4002 households in total.

== Education ==
The literacy rate of Durgapur Union is 36.7% (Male-39.6%, Female-33.9%).

== See also ==
- Union Councils of Tangail District
