= Parkhi Union =

Parkhi Union পারখী ইউনিয়ন
- Location of Parkhi Union in Bangladesh
- Coordinates: 24.3653355°N 89.9591792°E
- Country: Bangladesh
- Division: Dhaka Division
- District: Tangail District
- Upazila: Kalihati Upazila
- Established on: 1984

Government
  - Type: Union Council

Area
  - Total: 25.99 km^{2} (10.03 sq mi)
- Elevation: 15 m (49 ft)

Population (2011)
  - Total: 19,164
  - Density: 737.4/km^{2} (1,910/sq mi)
- Time zone: UTC+6 (BST)
- Postal code: 1970
- Website: Official Website of Parkhi Union

Parkhi Union (Bengali: পারখী ইউনিয়ন) is a union of Kalihati Upazila, Tangail District, Bangladesh. It is situated 19 km north of Tangail, The District Headquarter.

== Demographics ==
According to Population Census 2011 performed by Bangladesh Bureau of Statistics, The total population of Parkhi union is 19164. There are 4622 households in total.

== Education ==
The literacy rate of Parkhi Union is 44.5% (Male-47.8%, Female-41.6%).
