= Kok Dohora Union =

Kokdahara Union কোকডহরা ইউনিয়ন
- Location of Kokdahara Union in Bangladesh
- Coordinates: 24.3432°N 90.0048°E
- Country: Bangladesh
- Division: Dhaka Division
- District: Tangail District
- Upazila: Kalihati Upazila
- Established on: 1984

Government
  - Type: Union Council
  - Chairman: Nazrul Islam (Bangladesh Nationalist Party)

Area
  - Total: 20.74 km^{2} (8.01 sq mi)
- Elevation: 13 m (43 ft)

Population (2011)
  - Total: 28,770
  - Density: 1,387/km^{2} (3,593/sq mi)
- Time zone: UTC+6 (BST)
- Postal code: 1973
- Website: kokdohoraup.tangail.gov.bd

Kokdahara Union (Bengali: কোকডহরা ইউনিয়ন) is a union of Kalihati Upazila, Tangail District, Bangladesh. It is situated 26 km northeast of Tangail, the district headquarters.

== Demographics ==
According to the Population Census 2011 performed by the Bangladesh Bureau of Statistics, The total population of Kok Dohora union is 28770. There are 7270 households in total.

== Related to the kokdahara Union Council ==
  - 1. Chairman: Md. Nurul Islam.
  - 2. Secretary/Administrative Officer: Punnabashi Karmakar.

See

  - 1.U.D.C Entrepreneur: Md. Jowel Rana. Father: Md. Sultan (Romjan), Village: Pach Charan (pacchim para).

Entrepreneurs and Council Details Page: https://www.facebook.com/udckokdahara See

  - 1. UP Accounting Assistant-Cum Computer Operator: Md. Bishu Mia (Arif). Village: Aug charan.

View

  - 1. Village Police:
  - Nirmal Das -Gram Police -
  - Ajid Das-Gram Police-
  - Raimohan Das-Gram Police (Dafdar)-
  - Mint Rani Das-Gram Police
  - Nirmal Das-Gram Police
  - Md. Rabbi-Gram Police
  - Zahurul Islam-Gram Police
  - Nagendra Chandra Sarkar-Gram Police
  - Md. Sirajul-Gram Police
  - Saheb Ali-Gram Police

View

== Education ==
The literacy rate of Kok Dohora Union is 37.8% (Male-40.3%, Female-35.4%).

== See also ==
- Union Councils of Tangail District
