= Bangra Union =

Bangra Union বাংড়া ইউনিয়ন
- Location of Bangra Union in Bangladesh
- Coordinates: 24.3653355°N 89.9591792°E
- Country: Bangladesh
- Division: Dhaka Division
- District: Tangail District
- Upazila: Kalihati Upazila
- Established on: 1984

Government
  - Type: Union Council

Area
  - Total: 20.22 km^{2} (7.81 sq mi)
- Elevation: 17 m (56 ft)

Population (2011)
  - Total: 28,872
  - Density: 1,428/km^{2} (3,698/sq mi)
- Time zone: UTC+6 (BST)
- Postal code: 1970
- Website: Official Website of Bangra Union

Bangra Union (Bengali: বাংড়া ইউনিয়ন) is a union of Kalihati Upazila, Tangail District, Bangladesh. It is situated 17 km north of Tangail, The District Headquarter.

== Demographics ==
According to Population Census 2011 performed by Bangladesh Bureau of Statistics, The total population of Bangra union is 28872. There are 6885 households in total.

== Education ==
The literacy rate of Bangra Union is 46.8% (Male-50.6%, Female-43.2%).

== See also ==
- Union Councils of Tangail District
