= Shahadebpur Union =

Shahadebpur Union সহদেবপুর ইউনিয়ন
- Location of Salla Union in Bangladesh
- Coordinates: 24.326159°N 89.961226°E
- Country: Bangladesh
- Division: Dhaka Division
- District: Tangail District
- Upazila: Kalihati Upazila
- Established on: 1984

Government
  - Type: Union Council
  - Chairman: Masudur Rahman Bala (Bangladesh Nationalist Party)

Area
  - Total: 19.2 km^{2} (7.4 sq mi)
- Elevation: 15 m (49 ft)

Population (2011)
  - Total: 27,036
  - Density: 1,410/km^{2} (3,650/sq mi)
- Time zone: UTC+6 (BST)
- Postal code: 1974
- Website: Official Website of Shahadebpur Union

Shahadebpur Union (Bengali: সহদেবপুর ইউনিয়ন) is a union of Kalihati Upazila, Tangail District, Bangladesh. It is situated 16 km north of Tangail, the district headquarters.

== Demographics ==
According to Population Census 2011 performed by Bangladesh Bureau of Statistics, the total population of Shahadebpur union is 27,036. There are 6,692 households in total.

== Education ==
The literacy rate of Shahadebpur Union is 41.4% (Male: 44.6%, Female: 38.4%).

== See also ==
- Union Councils of Tangail District
