= Dashkia Union =

Union council in Dhaka Division, Bangladesh

Dashkia Union দশকিয়া ইউনিয়ন
- Location of Dashkia Union in Bangladesh
- Coordinates: 24.369366°N 89.867701°E
- Country: Bangladesh
- Division: Dhaka Division
- District: Tangail District
- Upazila: Kalihati Upazila
- Established on: 1984

Government
  - Type: Union Council
  - Chairman: Abdul Malek Bhuiyan (Bangladesh Awami League)

Area
  - Total: 11.36 km^{2} (4.39 sq mi)
- Elevation: 18 m (59 ft)

Population (2011)
  - Total: 15,100
  - Density: 1,330/km^{2} (3,440/sq mi)
- Time zone: UTC+6 (BST)
- Postal code: 1970
- Website: dashkiaup.tangail.gov.bd

Dashkia Union (Bengali: দশকিয়া ইউনিয়ন) is a union council of Kalihati Upazila, Tangail District, Bangladesh. It is situated 22 km north of Tangail, on the bank of the Bangshai River.

== Demographics ==
According to Population Census 2011 performed by Bangladesh Bureau of Statistics, The total population of Dashkia union is 15100. There are 3667 households in total.

== Education ==
The literacy rate of Dashkia Union is 46.2% (Male-51.1%, Female-41.5%).

== See also ==
- Union Councils of Tangail District
