= Narandia Union (Kalihati) =

Narandia Union নারান্দিয়া ইউনিয়ন
- Location of Narandia Union in Bangladesh
- Coordinates: 24.403470°N 89.912194°E
- Country: Bangladesh
- Division: Dhaka Division
- District: Tangail District
- Upazila: Kalihati Upazila
- Established on: 1984

Government
  - Type: Union Council
  - Chairman: Shukur Mamud (Bangladesh Awami League)

Area
  - Total: 25.36 km^{2} (9.79 sq mi)
- Elevation: 16 m (52 ft)

Population (2022)
  - Total: 32,664
  - Density: 1,288/km^{2} (3,336/sq mi)
- Time zone: UTC+6 (BST)
- Postal code: 1976
- Website: Official Website of Narandia Union

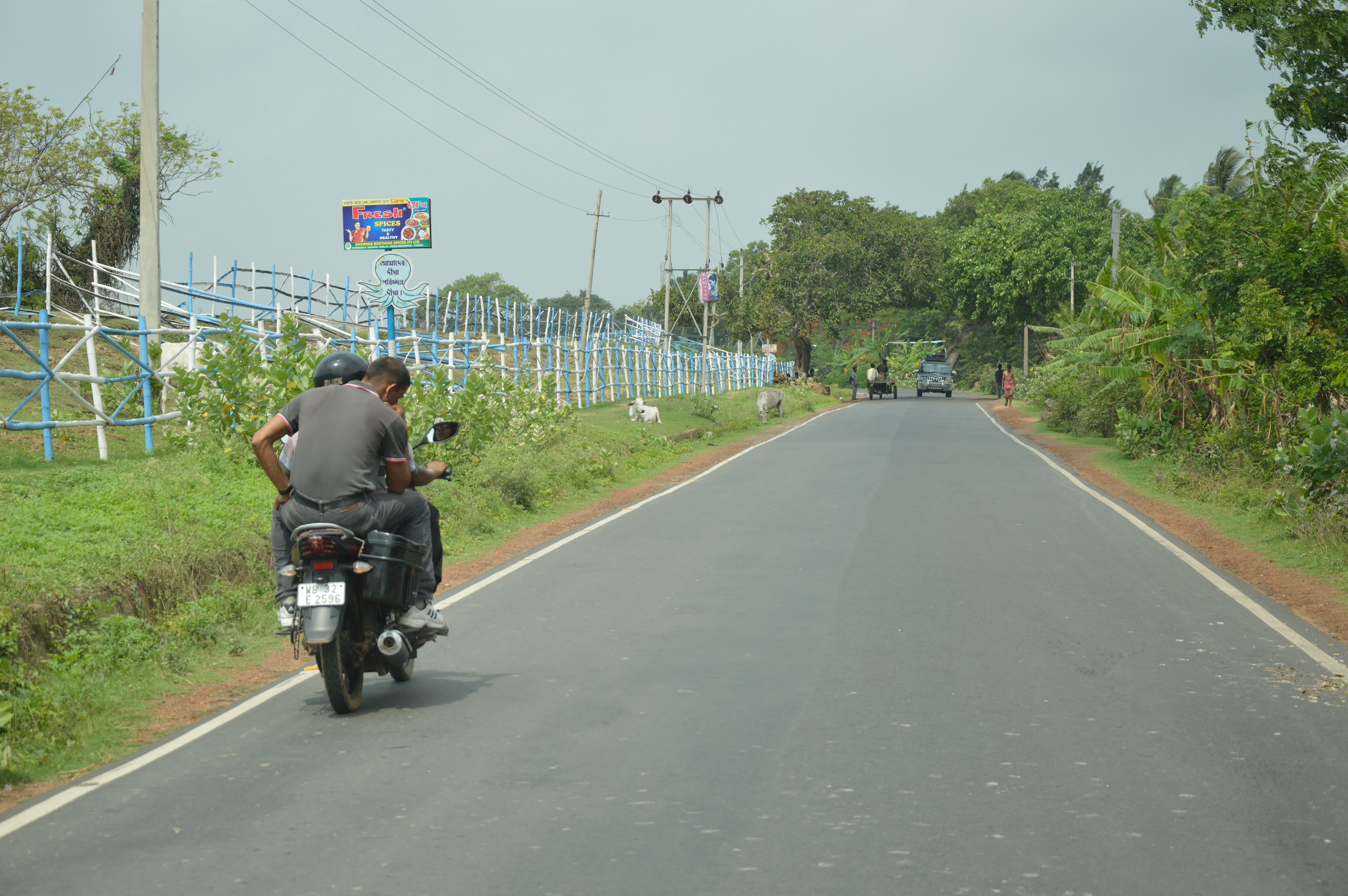
Narandia

Narandia Union (Bengali: নারান্দিয়া ইউনিয়ন) is a union of Kalihati Upazila, Tangail District, Bangladesh. It is situated 20 km north of Tangail, the district headquarter.

== Demographics ==
According to Population Census 2022 performed by Bangladesh Bureau of Statistics, the total population of Narandia Union is 32,664. There were 7,520 households in total in 2011 census.

== Education ==
The literacy rate of Narandia Union is 46.2% (male-49.1%, female-43.6%).

== See also ==
- Union Councils of Tangail District
