= Salla Union =

Salla Union সল্লা ইউনিয়ন
- Location of Salla Union in Bangladesh
- Coordinates: 24.374465°N 89.860419°E
- Country: Bangladesh
- Division: Dhaka Division
- District: Tangail District
- Upazila: Kalihati Upazila
- Established on: 1984

Government
  - Type: Union Council
  - Chairman: Abdul Alim (Bangladesh Awami League)

Area
  - Total: 14.1 km^{2} (5.4 sq mi)
- Elevation: 15 m (49 ft)

Population (2011)
  - Total: 19,916
  - Density: 1,410/km^{2} (3,660/sq mi)
- Time zone: UTC+6 (BST)
- Postal code: 1977
- Website: Official Website of Salla Union

Salla Union (Bengali: সল্লা ইউনিয়ন) is a union of Kalihati Upazila, Tangail District, Bangladesh. It is situated 21 km north of Tangail, The District Headquarter.

== Demographics ==
According to Population Census 2011 performed by Bangladesh Bureau of Statistics, The total population of Salla union is 19916. There are 4798 households in total.

== Education ==
The literacy rate of Salla Union is 38.2% (Male-40.9%, Female-35.6%).

== See also ==
- Union Councils of Tangail District
