= Shoumo Bhattacharya =

Indian physician-scientist

Shoumo Bhattacharya is an Indian medical doctor and academic, and the British Heart Foundation (BHF) Professor of Cardiovascular Medicine at the BHF Centre of Research Excellence, University of Oxford.

== Education and career ==
Bhattacharya studied medicine at the All India Institute of Medical Sciences, Delhi, qualifying as MBBS 1983, and MD in 1985.

He trained in cardiology at Northwick Park and Hammersmith Hospitals in London, where he was also a Medical Research Council (MRC) Training Fellow. He then held BHF and National Institutes of Health (NIH) Fellowships at the Dana-Farber Cancer Institute. Bhattacharya was a Wellcome Trust Senior Fellow at Oxford from 1998 to 2008. He was awarded a BHF Professorship in 2009 and was elected to a statutory Professorship at the University of Oxford in 2010.

Bhattacharya is also a Governing Body Fellow of Green Templeton College and member of the College Council.

== Research interests ==
Bhattacharya's research focuses on genetic mechanisms in heart development and congenital heart disease, and developing novel therapeutics and targets. This includes research on how proteins in the saliva of ticks might be able to prevent myocarditis. His work has also investigated which genes are critical for the heart to develop normally and maintain healthy function in adulthood, using genetic techniques and state-of the art imaging technology to study how alterations in these genes affect the structure of the heart and lead to congenital heart anomalies or heart failure. He has also been investigating how environmental factors act together with gene variations to influence the development of heart conditions, for example studying how a mother's diet may affect the chances of congenital heart disease in the baby, and how stress (such as high blood pressure) interacts with gene variations to cause heart failure.

== Recognition ==
Bhattacharya was elected a Fellow of the Royal College of Physicians in 2003 and was awarded the Graham Bull Prize from the Royal College of Physicians in 2005. He was elected a Fellow of the Academy of Medical Sciences in 2006.
