= Sharmila Bhattacharya =

Indian-American scientist

Sharmila Bhattacharya is an Indian-American scientist who works as the chief scientist for astrobionics and head of the Biomodel Performance and Behavior laboratory at NASA Ames Research Center. She is the subject matter expert of the US Senate Committee on Commerce, Science and Transportation and the principal investigator for Biomodel Performance Laboratory of Space Biosciences Division of NASA Ames Research Center. She was part of a project which sent fruit flies into space to study human illnesses and to study the effects of space radiation, both which will help space explorers. She has received the Ames Honor Award the successful launch of the MVP-Fly-01 experiment, 2018, NASA Exceptional Scientific Achievement Medal, 2018, etc.

== Early life and education ==
Sharmila Bhattacharya was born in Lagos, Nigeria, to Bengali Indian parents and grew up Kolkata. She lived on Park Street. Her father, Sukhdeb Bhattacharya, was an Indian Airlines pilot.

Sharmila Bhattacharya did her schooling from La Martiniere for Girls and Loreto House. After getting a bachelor's degree in Human Physiology in Presidency College, Kolkata and Biological Chemistry from Wellesley College, she started her career out as an undergraduate research assistant in the biochemistry lab at Princeton University. After that she earned her master's degree and Ph.D. at Princeton University for her research in Molecular Biology, where she studied the signal transduction pathway for the ras oncogene in Saccharomyces cerevisiae. She then went on to do her post-doctoral research at Stanford University in Neurobiology.

== Career ==
Soon after completing her research at Stanford, she was awarded a job by Lockheed Martin to work at the NASA Ames Research Center. She was the principal investigator for the space shuttle flight experiment, Fungal Pathogenesis, Tumorigenesis, and Effects of Host Immunity in Space (FIT), which flew on STS-121 on July 4, 2006.

She was later promoted to the spot of chief scientist for astrobionics at the NASA Ames Research Center. Her research at NASA has involved studying immune system changes during spaceflight and the effects of radiation and altered gravity on living systems.

Sharmila was also the lecturer of neurobiology in University of California, Santa Cruz in 1998. She was the lead scientist on several projects of NASA Ames Research Center.

== Selected papers ==
- S. Bhattacharya, Heavner ME, Ramroop J, Gueguen G, Ramrattan G, Dolios G, Scarpati M, Kwiat J, Wang R, Singh S, Govind S (2017). Novel Organelles with Elements of Bacterial and Eukaryotic Secretion Systems Weaponize Parasites of Drosophila. Current Biology. 2017 Sep 7.
- Straume T, Slaba T, Bhattacharya S, Braby LA. Radiation Information for Designing and Interpreting Biological Experiments Onboard Missions Beyond Low Earth Orbit (2017).
- Hosamani R, Leib R, Bhardwaj SR, Adams CM, Bhattacharya S (2016). Elucidating the “Gravome”: Quantitative Proteomic Profiling of the Response to Chronic Hypergravity in Drosophila. Journal of proteome research. 2016 Oct 10;15(12):4165-75.
- Developing New Habitats for Life Science Experiments on the International Space Station
- T.Fahlen, M. Sanchez, M.Lera, E.Blazevic, J.Chang, and S.Bhattacharya (2006). A Study of the Effects of Spaceflight on the Immune Response in Drosophila melanogaster. Gravitational and Space Biol. 19(2):133
- S. Bhattacharya, B.A. Stewart, B.A. Niemeyer, R.W. Burgess, B.D.McCabe, P.Lin, G.Boulianne, C.J. O’Kane, & T.L. Schwarz (2002). Members of the Synaptobrevin/VAMP family in Drosophila are functionally interchangeable in vivo for neurotransmitter release and cell viability. Proceedings of the National Academy of Sciences. 99(21):13867-13872.
- S. Bhattacharya, R.Bowman, F.Donovan, B.Girten, E.Hill, M.Kirven-Brooks, O.Santos (2001). The Space Station Biological Research Project: Habitat Development and Capabilities. Publication of the American Institute of Aeronautics and Astronautics, #2001-4984: 1-11.
- F.S. Neumann-Silberberg, S. Bhattacharya, & J.R. Broach (1995). Nutrient Availability and RAS/cAMP Both Induce Expression of Ribosomal Protein Genes in Saccharomyces but by Different Mechanisms. Molecular and Cellular Biology, 15: 3187-3196.
- S. Bhattacharya, L. Chen, J.R. Broach, & S. Powers (1995). Ras Membrane Targeting is Essential for Glucose Signaling but not for Viability in Yeast. Proceedings of the National Academy of Sciences, 92: 2984-2988
