= Mirzapur Upazila =

Mirzapur মির্জাপুর
- Upazila
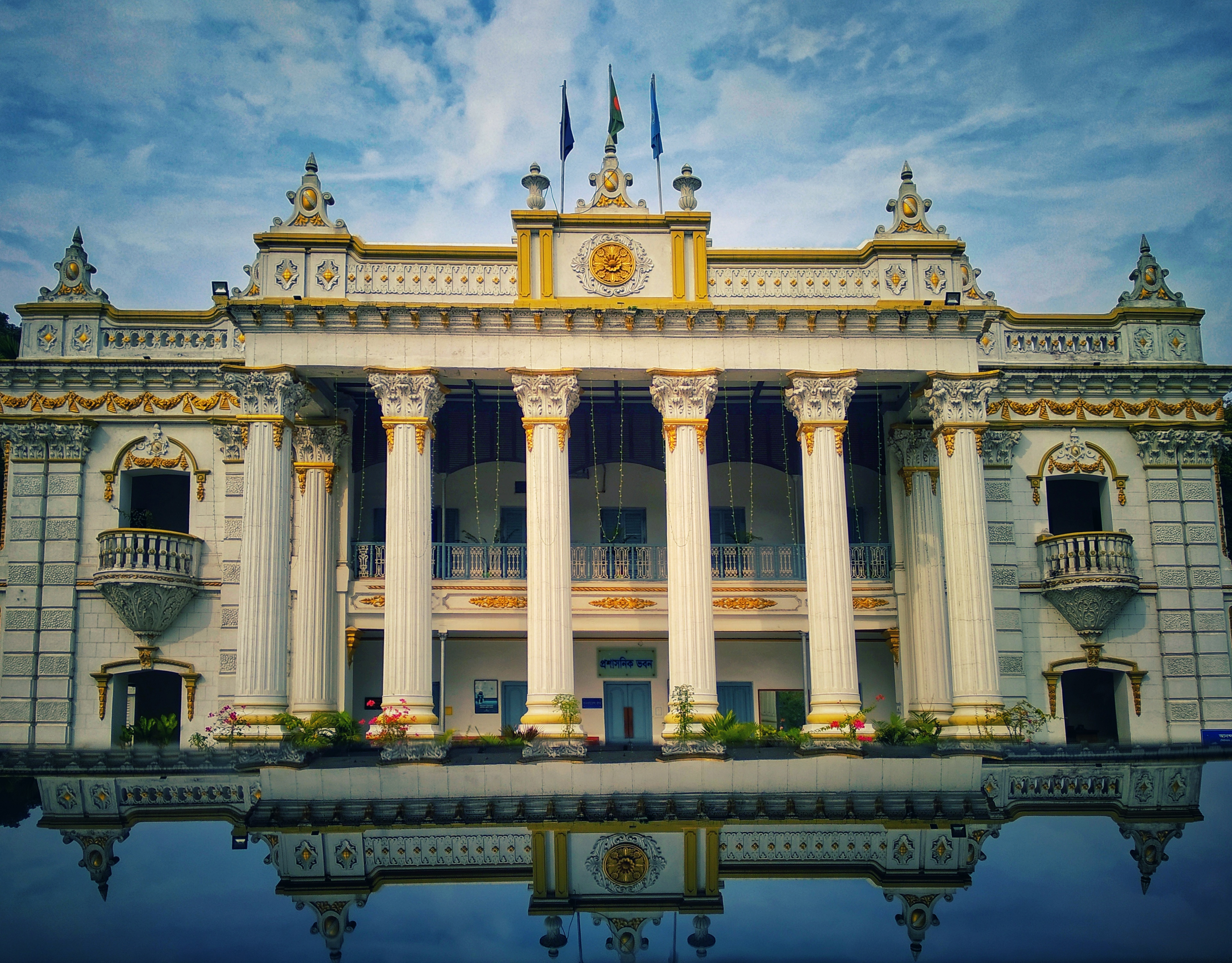
- Mohera Zamindar Bari

- Coordinates: 24°6.5′N 90°5.5′E
- Country: Bangladesh
- Division: Dhaka
- District: Tangail

Area
  - Total: 373.88 km^{2} (144.36 sq mi)

Population (2022)
  - Total: 474,658
  - Density: 1,269.5/km^{2} (3,288.1/sq mi)
- Time zone: UTC+6 (BST)
- Postal code: 1940
- Area code: 0922
- Website: mirzapur.tangail.gov.bd

Mirzapur Upazila mauza geocode map

Mirzapur (Bengali: মির্জাপুর) is an upazila of Tangail District in the division of Dhaka, Bangladesh.

== Geography ==
Mirzapur is located at 24.1083°N 90.0917°E. It has 93,880 households and a total area of 373.88 km^{2}.

== Demographics ==
Religions in Mirzapur Upazila (2022)
Religion	Percent
Islam	88.46%
Hinduism	11.45%
Other or not stated	0.09%

According to the 2022 Bangladeshi census, Mirzapur Upazila had 125,751 households and a population of 474,658. 7.95% of the population were under 5 years of age. Mirzapur had a literacy rate (age 7 and over) of 74.98%: 78.46% for males and 71.84% for females, and a sex ratio of 91.60 males for every 100 females. 71,958 (15.16%) lived in urban areas.

According to the 2011 Census of Bangladesh, Mirzapur Upazila had 93,880 households and a population of 407,781. 82,875 (20.32%) were under 10 years of age. Mirzapur had a literacy rate (age 7 and over) of 55.51%, compared to the national average of 51.8%, and a sex ratio of 1088 females per 1000 males. 35,414 (8.68%) lived in urban areas.

As of the 1991 Bangladesh census, Mirzapur has a population of 337,496. Males constitute 50.31% of the population, and females 49.69%. The number of adults is 178312. Mirzapur has an average literacy rate of 32.9% (7+ years), as compared to the national average of 32.4% literacy.

== Economy ==
The main business of the people is agriculture. Rice and jute are the main crops of this area. Other seasonal crops like mustard oil and potatoes are also grown here. The rest of the people of the upazila have other occupations in fields including business, teaching, public service, and private service. Recently, a number of NGOs have been working in this area and many local people are linked with the activities of these NGOs. In addition, people from this area receive a large amount of remittance from abroad. Often, at least one member of each family goes abroad. For this reason the economical system is better in this upazila than in other areas. Nowadays people are changing their fortune by doing the works of agriculture.

== Administration ==
Mirzapur Upazila is divided into Mirzapur Municipality and 14 union parishads: Ajgana, Anaitara, Bahuria, Banail, Banshtail, Bhaora, Bhatgram, Fatepur, Gorai, Jamurki, Latifpur, Mohera, Tarafpur, and Warshi. The union parishads are subdivided into 202 mauzas and 210 villages.

Mirzapur Municipality is subdivided into 9 wards and 17 mahallas.

=== Political leaders ===
- Chairman of District Council: Fazlur rahman faruque, (President, Tangail District Awami League ), Ex- MP of Mirzapur
- MP: Khan Ahmed Shuvo, President, Tangail Chamber of Commerce & Industries (Executive Member, Tangail District Awami League).
- Ex-MP: Abul Kalam Azad Siddique, Bangladesh Nationalist Party(BNP), President, Mirzapur Upazila BNP.
- Upazila Chairman: Mir Enayet Hossain (Montu), from Awami League
- Vice Chairman: Azharul Islam Azahar, from Awami League
- Woman Vice Chairman: Ms. Salma Salam [Urmi] from Awami League

There are also some political leaders such as Eng. Mridha Nazrul Islam, Sadek Ahmed Khan, Syed Majibar Rahman Peshuary, Mir Sharif mahmud, Abdur Razzak bsc, Shafiqul Islam (Alal) and Engg. Md. Harun Orrashid.

- Principal Maulana Abdullah Talukder – District Education Secretary of Bangladesh Jamaat-e-Islami and Jamaat-nominated candidate active in political activities in Mirzapur Upazila.

Apart from Jamurki Union, Awamileague has a strong base in every other unions.

== Organizations ==
Some organizations of Mirzapur are listed below.

=== Kumudini Hospital ===
Kumudini Hospital was established in 1944 by the philanthropist Ranada Prasad Shaha. Starting from 20 beds it now has 750 beds with its own full-fledged diagnostic facilities. Apart from indoor and outdoor facilities it has a village outreach program. It has provided treatment to 36,023 patients in indoor services and 2, 36,442 patients in outdoor services in 2010 (as per treatment statistics of 2010).

The hospital used to provide complete free service. However, from 1993 the Trust started a Patient's Participation Program for which the patients are to pay just for their medication. The outdoor patients have to buy a card worth of taka 10.00 only, which is valid for six months and within this time the patients can utilize all sorts of outdoor facilities with this card. In case of emergency there is a separate arrangement as well.

The hospital has its own diagnostic laboratory with all necessary general diagnostic facilities. In addition to diagnostic services this laboratory has, on a rather limited scale, research and training facilities. It has separate units in medicine, surgery, gynae & obs, eye, ENT, pediatrics and dentistry. The hospital has further plans to establish a modern cardiac centre, a modern ICU, a modern nephrology centre, an udgradation centre and a modern trauma centre in the near future. The hospital units contribute directly to the hands-on teaching of the medical students.

=== Bharateswari Homes ===
Bharateswari Homes is a boarding school for girls located in Mirzapur upazila, Tangail District, Bangladesh. The school was established in 1945 by philanthropist Ranadaprasad Saha. He established the institution for girls' education and named it after his grandmother Bharateswari Devi.

Bharateswari Homes is the first residential development in the region. The school introduced higher secondary education (HSC) in 1962. However, the HSC section closed in 1973. It started again in 1983. In 2013 the school had about 1000 students and 60 teachers.

Apart from regular studies, students at the school take active part in cultural activities, particularly in physical training. The school is nationally renowned for the unique physical training offered to its students. Each year a Bhatateswari Homes party is invited by the government to perform in the celebrations of national days and national festivals in Dhaka.

The school provides education and training in computer literacy and also runs an English Language Club, a Science Club, a Debating Club and a unit of the BISWa SAHITYa KENDRA. In 1997, Bharateswari Homes formed Girls-in-Scout, which is the largest children's organisation of the country.

=== Mirzapur Overview ===
Masdai is one of the villages of Mirzapur Upazila, which is under Warshi Union. Masdai village is also famous for football games and has presented some quality football players in the Dhaka first division league. There are primary schools and high school in the village. Masdai village is a village for education, art culture and professional people in country and abroad.. There is an ideal union in Mirzapur named "Bashtail". There is a school there, named "Bashtail M M A high school". There are also a college, a madrasha, a primary school, and many kindergartens. Bashtail is very developed in sports. The football team of Bashtail is the champion among the district.

Newly formed Bhawra Union, there is a village Bhawra, a high school, and primary school, Garamara gohailbari Sobuj shena uccha Biddaloy is also a renowaned school of Bohurea union. Barati Nardana Bangladesh High School of Banail Union.

Kamarpar is a nearby village. One primary school and post are in this village. This village also has a bazaar where every morning people come to purchase and sell necessary goods. CBA Non Gov. Primary School, Village: Chowhattur Union Vatgram. Ex.Secretary CBA School Management.

Thalpara is a nearby village. There are many canals and two rivers around the village. There is a primary school and Hapizia Madrasha. The primary school name is (43 No: thalpara primary school).

An industrial area has grown up at Gorai union including Nasir Glass & Tubes, Naheed Cotton Mill, Newtex Dyeing&Printing, Uttara Spinning, Youth Spinning Mill, Comfit Composite Mill, and Masafi bread and biscuit factory.

== Transport ==
Mirzapur is directly linked with the highway from Dhaka to Tangail (connected to Bangbandhu Bridge on Jamuna River). Also there is a Dual-Gauge Rail-line from Dhaka to Rajshahi and Khulna.

However, the internal communication system is very poor. The roads within the upazila, connected to different unions and villages, are badly less developed. Maximum people are to come to the Upazila Headquarters on foot or bicycles. There is no scope to run any vehicle. Especially, the road from Mirzapur to Nagarpur via Nagar Bhad Gram is in odd situation.

(12.08.2023) Recently the situation has been changed. The internal roads have been developed and different types of vehicles run including large bus & trucks. But the roads should be widen more. FAZLUR RAHMAN HIRON

(Pakulla-Lawhati Road was reconstructed last year as well)

== Notable people ==
- Sayed Moazzem Hossain, Islamic scholar and 6th vice-chancellor of Dhaka University

== Education ==
- Burihati High School

== See also ==
- Mirzapur, Bangladesh
- Upazilas of Bangladesh
- Districts of Bangladesh
- Divisions of Bangladesh
