= Lokenath Bhattacharya =

- Born: October 9, 1927; Bhatpara, INDIA
- Died: 23 March 2001; Cairo Egypt
- Occupations: Writer, poet, translator
- Spouse: France Bhattacharya
- Children: 1
- Writing career
- Subjects: Poetry, Bengali literature,

Lokenath Bhattacharya (Bengali: লোকনাথ ভট্টাচার্য; 1927–2001) was a prolific Bengali writer who chose to remain in isolation. Though 15 of his books have been translated into French, only 'Babughater Kumari Maach' (The Virgin Fish of Babughat) has been translated into English. He finished his doctorate study in Paris. After spending his working life in India, he went back to France to spend the last decade of his life with his wife who is French. He has translated the poetry of Rimbaud, Henri Michaux into Bengali. He died in Egypt in a car accident.

== Life and education ==
He was born in an Orthodox family in Bhatpara, North 24 Parganas West Bengal, India. His initial training was in Sanskrit. He then went to the Visva-Bharati University in Santiniketan for higher studies. After studying French in the Alliance Française in Calcutta, he went to University of Paris for his doctoral degree on French government scholarship. He immersed himself in French literature and translated Rimbaud, Henri Michaux and Descartes into Bengali. Despite his significant literary output, Lokenath never received the kind of critical attention he deserved in the Bengali literary circle. As Meenakshi Mukherjeer writes in the introduction of her English translation of the book The Virgin Fish of Babughat, "He remained a writers' writer, discussed in little magazines and exclusive literary journals, forever an outsider in the mainstream literary world of Kolkata. Apart from the unfamiliarity of his imaginative world, the fact that he spent most of his adult life outside Bengal might also have accentuated his alienation."

Lokenath was married to France Bhattacharya who in her turn spread Bengali Literature in France. France Bhattacharya, holder of a doctorat d’état in Indian Studies, is emeritus professor, Inalco, member of the Centre for the study on India and South Asia, CEIAS, and was till recently director of the Fondation Maison des Sciences de l’Homme programme for India and South Asia. She works on Bengali pre-colonial literature mainly from a perspective of religious and social history.

She has translated several Bengali novels into French such as: Le monastère de la félicité (Ânandamath) (Paris, Le serpent à plumes, 2003) and Celle qui portrait des crânes en boucles d’oreilles (Kapâlkundalâ) by Bankim Chandra Chatterji (Paris, « Connaissance de l’Orient », Gallimard, 2005), Quatre chapitres (Châr adhyây) and Chârulatâ (Nasta nîr) by Rabindranath Tagore (Paris, Zulma, 2004 and 2009), La complainte du sentier (Pather Pâncâlî) by Bibhuti Bhushan Banerji, (Paris, Gallimard, 1969), as well as several fictions by her late husband Lokenath Bhattacharya, and his prose poems Ghar.

== Major works ==
Novels:

- Bhor (Bengali: ভোর, Daybreak ) 1966
- Jato Dawa Tato Aranya (যত দাওয়া তত অরণ্য, As Many Doors as Forests) 1966
- Dui-ekti Ghar, Du-ekti Swar (দুই-একটি ঘর, দুই-একটি স্বর, One or Two Rooms, One or Two Voices) 1967
- Babughater Kumari Maach (বাবুঘাটের কুমারী মাছ, The Virgin Fish of Babughat) 1972
- Theater Arambho Sare Saattay (থিয়েটার আরম্ভ সাড়ে সাতটায়, The Play Begins at Seven-Thirty) 1983
- Ashwamedh (অশ্বমেধ, 1997)
- Gangabataran (গঙ্গাবতরণ, 1998)

He also wrote four volumes of poetry, three plays, two collections of short stories, and two books of discursive prose.

=== The Virgin Fish of Babughat ===
'Babughater Kumari Maach' (বাবুঘাটের কুমারী মাছ, The Virgin Fish of Babughat, 1972) is the only works of his that has been translated into English. Here's the description from the back flap of Meenakshi Mukherjee's translation:

"The novel is set in a sinister detention camp where men and women are divested of their clothes and their past, but provided with all the luxuries of life including unlimited sexual gratification.

The narrator, a writer before he was brought to the prison, has been meted a unique punishment: he must fill up a stack of paper with words every day. He turns this task into a life line, writing frantically to recapture a world that is he has lost, to resuscitate the very language that he is in dance of forgetting, and to record the systematic dehumanization which is taking place around him. Yet, his account is not altogether bleak: there are lively accounts of people and events, humour, tenderness, love, and even hope."

This book has some interesting similarity with Margaret Atwood's The Handmaid's Tale (1985).

When the novel was written, India and West Bengal was going through a troubled times. The Naxal movement was at its peak in West Bengal. The government was using repressive measures to suppress the violence generated by the Naxalites. According to Mukherjee, the novel may have been a reference to the incidents. Kiranmoy Raha, a critique wrote this after Emergency was declared in India in 1975 (cited in Mukherjee): "'Babughater Kumari Maachh' is a futuristic allegory which projects the culmination of what the author feels to be present tendencies. It is an examination of the human situation in extremis. For an observer of the social scenre around, Lokenath Bhattachary's novel gives an uncomfortable feeling that the future may not be that far away, after all. It may be already there"

== Notes and references ==
- The Virgin Fish of Babughat, Lokenath Bhattacharya. Translated from Bengali by Meenakshi Mukherjee. Oxford University Press: New York, 2004.
- Recognise yourself? Sunday, May 2, 2004, The Hindu
