= Chitra Bhattacharya =

Bangladeshi politician

- Born: 1926; Netrokona, Bengal Presidency, British India
- Died: 29 November 2010 (aged 84); Kolkata, India
- Education: Masters (Sociology)
- Alma mater: University of Dhaka
- Spouse: Debesh Bhattacharya
- Children: Debapriya Bhattacharya

Chitra Bhattacharya (1926 – November 29, 2010) was a member of parliament of Bangladesh Jatya Sangsad. She was appointed from Tangail for the seat reserved for women in 1996 as an Awami League candidate.

== Early life and career ==
Bhattacharya was born to a Zamindar family in Netrakona. She passed matriculation examination from Rangpur and intermediate from Ananda Mohan College in Mymensingh. She later earned a master's degree on Sociology from University of Dhaka.

== Personal life ==
Bhattacharya was married to Justice Debesh Bhattacharya. They had three children – economist Debapriya Bhattacharya, physicist Debadarshi Bhattacharya and Debalina Roy.

She died in an Indian hospital in Kolkata due to age-related complications in November 2010.
