= Jogendra Nath Bhattacharya =

Jogendra Nath Bhattacharya was a pandit and one of a group of Hindu nationalists who held a benevolent view of the traditional role of caste in Indian society at a time, in the late nineteenth century, when social reformers were challenging the concept. He called the traditional varna system, comprising a four-tier ritual hierarchy, a "golden chain" that had been willingly worn by the population, and he expounded on his beliefs in an 1896 book - Hindu Castes and Sects - which was, in the opinion of Susan Bayly, "one of the first modern anthropological treatises to be produced by an Indian scholar." He had previously written Commentaries on Hindu Law and it was that which provided the impetus for his 1896 work.

Bhattacharya had graduated from the University of Calcutta. He became president of the Bengal Brahman Sabha, an organisation that claimed to represent a wide range of Brahmins within its territorial remit. He also headed a Brahmin organisation that claimed to provide rulings regarding what it considered to be matters of Hindu tradition, and which was known as the Nadia College of Pandits.

While many social reformers of the time saw caste as an outmoded and pernicious institution that served to restrict the development of India as a nation, Bhattacharya was among those who saw its traditional form as a glorious institution that was symbolic of and central to the entire concept of Hinduism and also to the country as an entity. The traditional caste-related notions, including that of varna, were things that in the past had marshalled the country into an orderly togetherness despite its diversity and the frequency with which it was invaded. To Bhattacharya and similarly conservative-minded people, caste in its age-old application was therefore a good thing, although they did not dispute that the contemporary reality of caste sometimes differed from its traditional roots. He "embraced assertive nationalist ideals, yet spoke from the platform of a 'modern' Hindu 'revivalist' organisation, not as a would-be caste reformer but as a passionate defender of established Brahmanical norms."

Bayly and others see a philosophical link from Bhattacharya through Swami Vivekananda and then on to Gandhi and those who embraced the Arya Samaj, based on similar notions of "national pride, social service and revived Hindu faith", as well as a recognition of the essential role that the varna system had played and could in future play in the development of the nation.
