= Shishir Bhattacharja =

Bangladeshi linguist and writer

- শিশির ভট্টাচার্য্য
- Born: 4 August 1963 (age 63); Sitakunda, Chittagong, East Pakistan
- Occupations: Professor, writer

Academic background
- Education: Paris-Sorbonne University (MA, MPhil); University of Montreal (PhD)

Academic work
- Discipline: Linguistics
- Sub-discipline: Bengali language, literature and culture
- Institutions: University of Dhaka
- Website: shishirbhattacharja.com

Shishir Bhattacharja (born 4 August 1963) is a Bangladeshi linguist, writer, columnist, and a professor of the French language at the University of Dhaka. He is also the Director of the Institute of Modern Languages, University of Dhaka. An ardent advocate and promoter of the Bengali language, he has written extensively on the use of Bengali in Bangladesh. He translated works of Guillaume Apollinaire, Arthur Rimbaud, and Bernard-Henri Lévy into Bengali and poems of Jibanananda Das into French.

== Education and career ==
Born in Sitakunda, Chattogram, he completed bachelor's and master's degrees in Indology and linguistics at Université Sorbonne Nouvelle. He received his PhD from the University of Montreal, Canada. He did his post-doctorate at the Institute of State Language at the University of Tokyo. In 1989, Bhattacharja joined Dhaka University, where he is, at present, the director of the Institute of Modern Languages. Accused of making hateful remarks against Islam and Muslims, as well as derogatory comments about victims of so called anti-discrimination movements, a group of Dhaka University students protested in front of the vice-chancellor's residence on December 12, demanding his dismissal.

== Selected works ==
=== In Bengali ===
- Ishwar Dharma Bishwas (ঈশ্বর ধর্ম বিশ্বাস, God Religion Faith)
- Samaj Sangskriti Shilpakala (সমাজ সংস্কৃতি শিল্পকলা, Society Culture Arts)
- Bangla Byakaraner Ruparekha (বাংলা ব্যাকরণের রূপরেখা, Outline of Bengali Grammar)
- Bangla Bhasha: Prakrita Samasya o Peshadari Samadhan (বাংলা ভাষা: প্রকৃত সমস্যা ও পেশাদারি সমাধান, (Bengali Language: Real Problems and Professional Solutions)
- Ja Kichu Byakaran Nay (যা কিছু ব্যাকরণ নয়, whatever is not Grammar)
- Antaranga Byakaran (অন্তরঙ্গ ব্যাকরণ, Intimate Grammar)
- Uchit Shiksha (উচিৎ শিক্ষা, Proper Education)
- Bishwabidyalayer Itihas: Adiparba (বিশ্ববিদ্যালয়ের ইতিহাস: আদিপর্ব, History of University: The Early Period)
- Jatrapala Chandragupta kingba Khamatasastrer Sohoj Path (যাত্রাপালা চন্দ্রগুপ্ত কিংবা ক্ষমতা-শাস্ত্রের সহজপাঠ, (Jatra Performance: Chandragupta or A Beginner's Guide to the Politics of Power)

==== Translations ====
- Bangladesh Jakhan Swadhin Hacchila (বাংলাদেশ যখন স্বাধীন হচ্ছিল, When Bangladesh was getting liberated), a Bengali translation of Bernard-Henri Lévy's Bangla-Desh, Nationalisme dans la révolution (1973)
- Rimbaud: Nirbachita Kabita ebang Patrabali (র‍্যাঁবো: নির্বাচিত কবিতা ও পত্রাবলি, Selected Poems and Letters of Rimbaud)
- Apollinaire: Nirbachita Kabita (আপোলিন্যার: নির্বাচিত কবিতা, Selected Poems of Apollinaire)

=== In English ===
- Word Formation in Bengali: A Whole Word Morphological Description and its Theoretical Implications

=== In French ===
- Bhagwan et son monde orange (1991)
- La poésie contemporaine du Bangladesh (Co-author)
