= Asoke Kumar Bhattacharyya =

Indian archaeologist, museologist, art historian and professor of Sanskrit

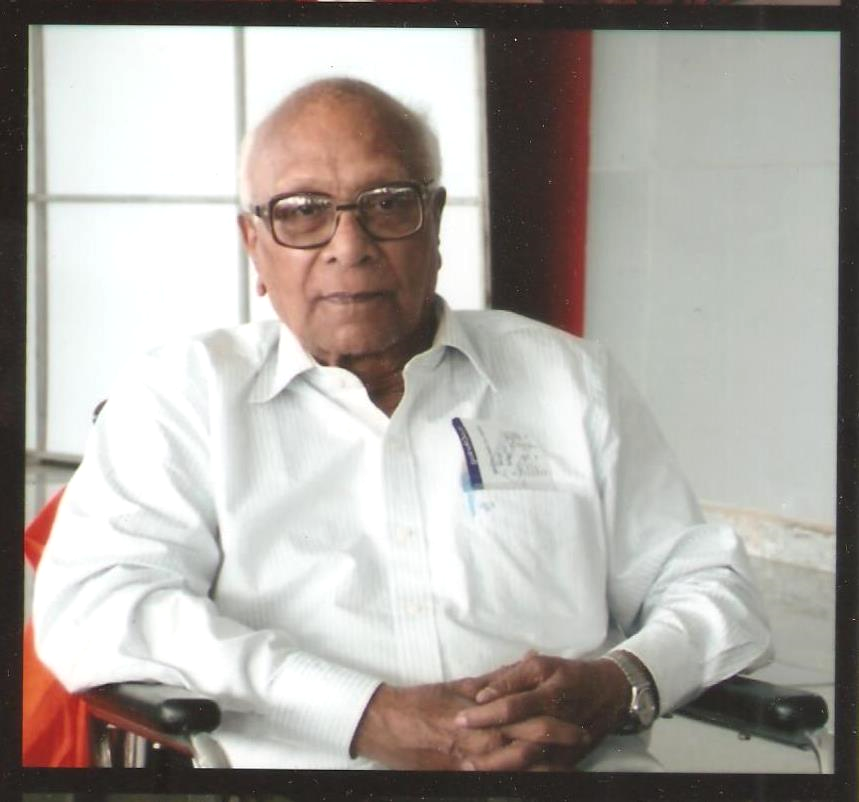
- Born: Asoke Kumar Bhattacharyya; 1 February 1919; Calcutta, Bengal Presidency, British India
- Died: 11 June 2016 (aged 97); Kolkata, West Bengal, India
- Education: Calcutta University
- Occupations: Archaeologist, Museologist, Art Historian
- Spouse: Sabita Bhattacharyya
- Children: 3
- Writing career
- Notable work: A Corpus of Dedicatory Inscriptions from Temples of West Bengal
- Notable awards: Padma Shri

Asoke Kumar Bhattacharyya (1 February 1919 – 11 June 2016) was an Indian archaeologist, museologist, art historian and professor of Sanskrit. He was the Director of the Indian Museum, Kolkata for a decade till his retirement. The Indian government awarded him Padma Shri in April 2017 posthumously.

Bhattacharyya has to his credit, 29 published books on various aspects of art, archaeology, epigraphy and numismatics and hundreds of research articles in journals across the world. In 2012, he was awarded the Acharya Hemchandra Suri Samman Puraskar, New Delhi for his outstanding contribution to Jaina iconography.

== Biography ==
Bhattacharyya was born in north Calcutta, to professor Harimohan Bhattacharyya on 1 February 1919. He studied in South Suburban School, Scottish Church College, completed his Master of Arts in Sanskrit from Calcutta University in 1941 with major in Epigraphy and iconography. He completed his Master of Arts in Arabic-Persian History in 1952. He was a gold medalist in both of his master's degrees. Meanwhile, he was honoured with Kabitirtha and Purantirtha. He completed Law in 1944. He received the Premchand Roychand Scholarship in 1949. He joined the Indian Museum as assistant curator in 1949. Later on from 1965 to 1975 he was the Director of the Indian Museum till retirement.

He died on 11 June 2016 at his residence in Lake Gardens, Kolkata.

== Books ==
His books include:

- A Corpus of Dedicatory Inscriptions from Temples of West Bengal, c. 1500 A.D. to c. 1800 A.D. 1982
- A Pageant of Indian Culture : art and archaeology 1995 ISBN 9788170172734
- Cultural, Historical, and Political Aspects of Perso-Arabic Epigraphy in India 1999 ISBN 978-8171020294
- Indian Contribution to the Development of Far Eastern Buddhist Iconography 2002 ISBN 978-8170742111
- Early and Buddhist Stone Sculpture of Japan 2004 ISBN 978-8170174226
- Buddhist Iconography in Thailand : a South East Asian perspective 2007
- Indian Numismatics And Its Cultural Aspects 2010 ISBN 978-8180902321
- Historical Development Of Jaina Iconography: A Comprehensive Study 2010 ISBN 978-8180902314
