= Balla Union =

Balla Union বল্লা ইউনিয়ন
- Location of Balla Union in Bangladesh
- Coordinates: 24.3332°N 90.0285°E
- Country: Bangladesh
- Division: Dhaka Division
- District: Tangail District
- Upazila: Kalihati Upazila
- Established on: 1984

Government
  - Type: Union Council
  - Chairman: Can Mahmud Pakir (Bangladesh Awami League)

Area
  - Total: 13.95 km^{2} (5.39 sq mi)
- Elevation: 18 m (59 ft)

Population (2011)
  - Total: 42,999
  - Density: 3,082/km^{2} (7,983/sq mi)
- Time zone: UTC+6 (BST)
- Postal code: 1973
- Website: ballaup.tangail.gov.bd

Balla Union (Bengali: বল্লা ইউনিয়ন)is a union of Kalihati Upazila, Tangail District, Bangladesh. It is situated 12 km northeast of Tangail, the district headquarters.

== Demographics ==
According to Population Census 2011 performed by Bangladesh Bureau of Statistics, The total population of Balla union is 42999. There are 10068 households in total.

== Education ==
The literacy rate of Balla Union is 41.1% (Male-43%, Female-38.8%).

== See also ==
- Union Councils of Tangail District
