= Debapriya Bhattacharya =

Bangladeshi economist

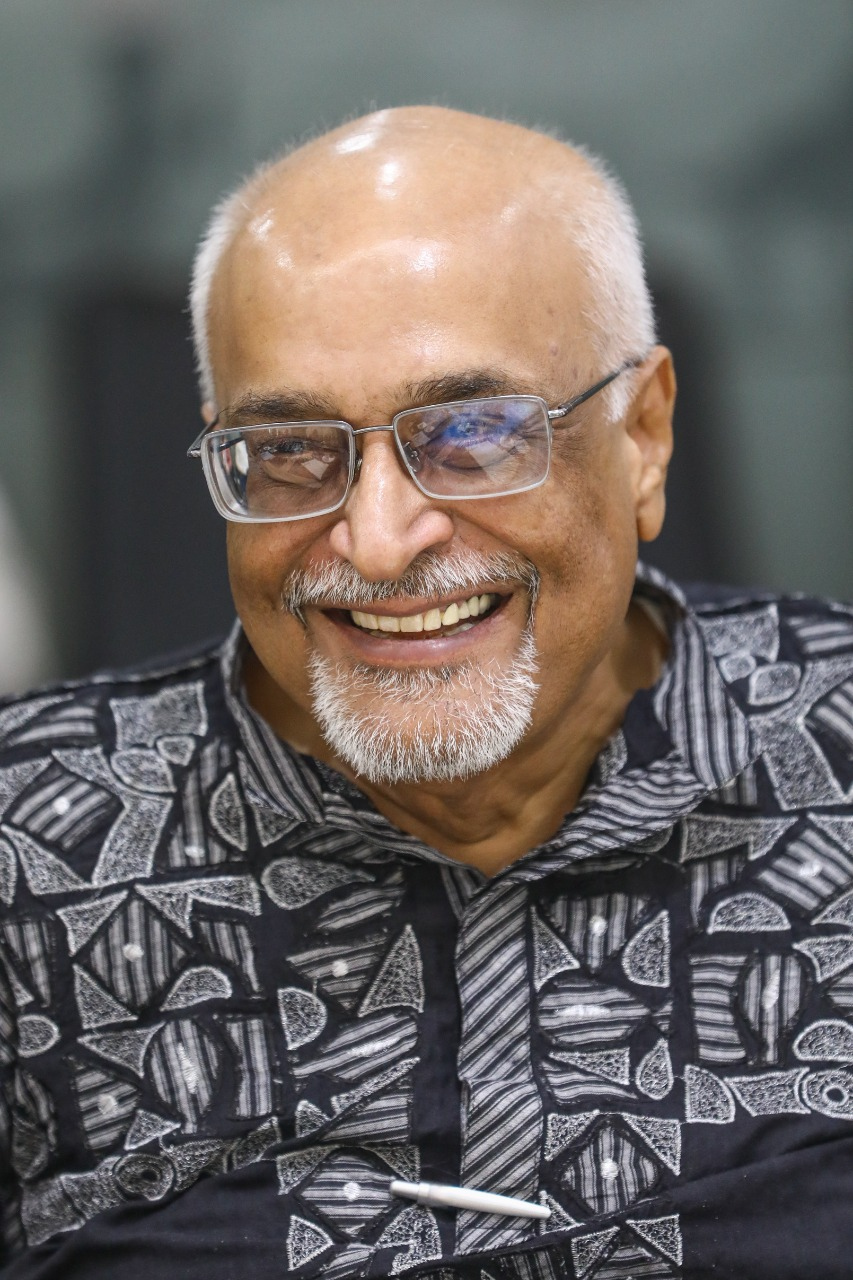
- Bhattacharya in 2013
- Education: Dhaka College; Plekhanov Institute of the National Economy
- Occupation: Economist
- Parent(s): Debesh Bhattacharya; Chitra Bhattacharya

Debapriya Bhattacharya is an economist and public policy analyst from Bangladesh. He was the first executive director of Centre for Policy Dialogue in Dhaka. He also worked as a senior research fellow at Bangladesh Institute of Development Studies (BIDS).

== Early life ==
Bhattacharya's father, Debesh Bhattacharya, was a Supreme Court jurist. Bhattacharya's mother, Chitra Bhattacharya, was a nominated member of parliament of the government of Bangladesh on a seat reserved for women during 1996 to 2001. Bhattacharya attended St Gregory's High School and Dhaka College. He earned his MSc and PhD in economics at the Plekhanov Institute of the National Economy, Moscow.

== Career ==
Bhattacharya served as an executive director of the Centre for Policy Dialogue (CPD). In 2007 he was appointed Ambassador and Permanent Representative of Bangladesh to the WTO and UN Office in Geneva. A year later he resigned from the post, recognising "the privileges of the incoming elected government to choose its Permanent Representative in Geneva".

== Publications ==
=== Books ===
Editor, co-editor, or co-author:

- Bhattacharya, D., et al, 2022. Data for Policymaking in the Pandemic Period: The Bangladesh Experience. Dhaka: Centre for Policy Dialogue (CPD)
- Bhattacharya, D. (Ed). 2019. Bangladesh's Graduation from the Least Developed Countries Group; Pitfalls and Promises. London: Routledge.
- Bhattacharya, D. and Ordonez A. (Eds.). 2016. Southern Perspectives on the Post-2015 International Development Agenda. London: Routledge.
- Bhattacharya, D. and Mikic, M. 2015. Least Developed Countries and Trade: Challenges of Implementing the Bali Package. UN ESCAP.
- Bhattacharya, D., Jahan, S. 2020. Global State of SDGs-Three Layers of Critical Action: Southern Voice.
