= Debesh Bhattacharya =

Bangladeshi Judge

- Born: 3 November 1914; Ellenga, Tangail, Bengal Presidency, British India
- Died: 2 February 2004 (aged 89); Dhaka, Bangladesh
- Education: Calcutta University
- Occupations: Lawmaker, activist
- Spouse: Chitra Bhattacharya
- Children: Debapriya Bhattacharya

Debesh Chandra Bhattacharya (3 November 1914 – 2 February 2004) was a Bangladeshi jurist who served at Bangladesh High Court and later at the Appellate Division of Bangladesh Supreme Court.

== Early life ==
Bhattacharya was born on 3 November 1914 in Ellenga, Tangail District, East Bengal, British India. He studied at the Ellenga Junior High School and graduated from Bindu Basini Govt. Boys' High School in 1931. He completed his Indian School Certificate in 1933 and bachelor's degree in 1935 from Presidency University, Kolkata. In 1938, he finished his law degree from the Department of Law, University of Calcutta. In 1940, he completed his master's degree in economics from the University of Calcutta.

== Career ==
Bhattacharya joined the Mymensingh District bar in 1941. From 1949 to 1951, he was detained for supporting workers and farmers movements. After his release he started practicing at the Dhaka High Court.

In 1956, Bhattacharya became a lawyer of the Supreme Court and became a senior advocate in 1961. He joined the Bar Council. He served in the Rule Committee of the Dhaka High Court till the Independence of Bangladesh in 1971 when the court became the High Court Division.

On 21 January 1972, Bhattacharya was appointed a judge of the newly established Bangladesh High Court and in June 1975 he was promoted to the Appellate Division of the Bangladesh Supreme Court. He retired from the bench in 1977 after President Ziaur Rahman reduced the retirement age of judges from 65 to 62.

Bhattacharya was the founding president of Bangladesh Enemy Property Act Repeal Committee and was involved in the creation of Gono Adalat. He was a member of Bangladesh Hindu Buddhist Christian Unity Council, Bangladesh Peace Council, Bangladesh Puja Udjapan Parishad, Bangladesh Nagarik Committee, and Mahanagar Sarbajanin Puja Committee. He was the president of Aleem-Al-Razi Law College which was named after Aleem al-Razee and Gandhi Ashram Trust.

== Death ==
Bhattacharya died on 2 February 2004.

== Personal life ==
Bhattacharya was married to Chitra Bhattacharya. Chitra (1926–2010) was appointed as a member of parliament from Tangail's reserved seat for women in 1996 on a nomination of Awami League. They had two sons, economist Debapriya Bhattacharya and physicist Debadarshi Bhattacharya, and one daughter Debalina Roy.
