= Mirzapur, Bangladesh =

Mirzapur মির্জাপুর
- Town
- Location within Bangladesh
- Coordinates: 24.1083°N 90.0917°E
- Country: Bangladesh
- Division: Dhaka Division
- District: Tangail District
- Upazila: Mirzapur Upazila

Government
  - Type: Pourashava
  - Mayor: Shahadwat Hossen (Bangladesh Awami League)

Area
  - Total: 8.58 km^{2} (3.31 sq mi)

Population
  - Total: 28,602
  - Density: 3,330/km^{2} (8,630/sq mi)
- Time zone: UTC+6 (BST)
- Postal codes: 1940
- Area code: 9229
- Website: mirzapur.tangail.gov.bd

Mirzapur (Bengali: মির্জাপুর) is a town of Mirzapur Upazila, Tangail District, Bangladesh. The town is situated 41 kilometres (25 mi) southeast of Tangail city and 54 kilometres (34 mi) northwest of Dhaka, the capital of Bangladesh.

== Demographics ==
According to the 2011 Bangladesh census, Mirzapur town had 6,129 households and a population of 28,602. The literacy rate (age 7 and over) was 69.7% (male: 71%, female: 68.6%).. It is well known as the home of the Kumudini Hospital and its associated institutions.

== See also ==
- Kalihati
- Ghatail
