= 1949 Tangail South by-election =

Pakistani By-election

- 26 April 1949

Tangail South (Rural) constituency of the East Bengal Legislative Assembly
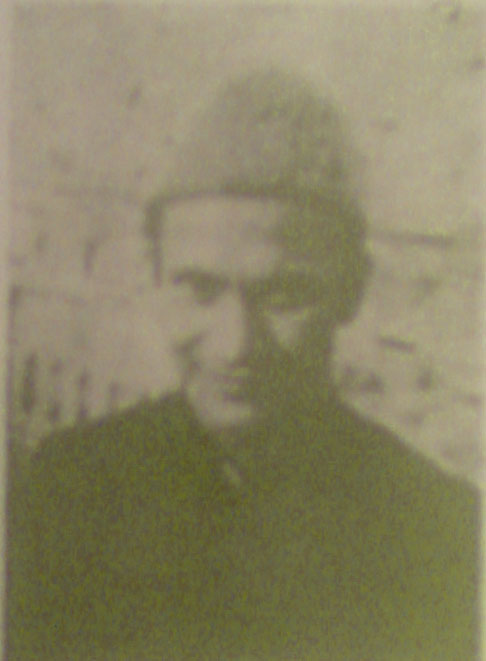
Nominee	Shamsul Huq	Khurram Khan Panni
Party	Independent	PML
MLA before election
Abdul Hamid Khan
Independent
Elected MLA
Shamsul Huq
Independent

After the January 1948 by-election for the Tangail South constituency of the East Bengal Legislative Assembly was declared void, another by-election was held on 26 April 1949 for the same constituency. In this election, independent candidate Shamsul Huq defeated Khurram Khan Panni, nominated by the Pakistan Muslim League (PML), and was elected.

== Background and nominations ==
After the partition of India in 1947, the Dominion of India and the Pakistan were created. Following this, Abdul Hamid Khan Bhashani, the president of the Assam Provincial Muslim League, settled in the Tangail subdivision of Mymensingh District in the Pakistani province of East Bengal. In the 1946 Bengal Legislative Assembly election, teacher Ibrahim Khan was elected. However, when he later resigned as a member of the East Bengal Legislative Assembly, his constituency named Tangail South became vacant. In January 1948, Bhasani was elected as a member of the East Bengal Legislative Assembly from the constituency in a by-election. However, his membership was later annulled due to election-related issues. (Note: The reason was Bhashani's decision to not submit an account of his election-related expenses. According to him, since the expenses were borne by his supporters, the question of submitting an account on his part should not arise. On the other hand, due to his support for the Bengali language movement and his criticism of the provincial government, party leaders became dissatisfied with Bhasani.) Additionally, a ban was imposed on Abdul Hamid Khan Bhashani and all other candidates who participated in that by-election, preventing them from contesting in any election until 1950.

In 1949, a new by-election was announced for the constituency. The ruling Pakistan Muslim League (PML) nominated Khurram Khan Panni, candidate of the previous by-election, despite the fact that he was under a government-imposed ban until 1950. At that time, Frederick Chalmers Bourne, the governor of East Bengal, lifted the restriction solely on Panni, thereby restoring his eligibility to contest. This decision sparked discontent among the provincial-level workers of the party. Meanwhile, Shamsul Huq, a member of the same party, announced his candidacy as an independent candidate against Panni in the by-election.

== Campaign ==
In response to Huq's announcement to contest the by-election, several individuals opposing the PML-led provincial government came forward to support him. His supporters raised Rs. 1,300 to fund the election campaign. Students from local educational institutions, including local Government Saadat College, actively participated in his campaign. Additionally, Panni's wife issued a public statement on behalf of Huq, urging the local populace not to vote for her husband.

In support of Panni, Mohammad Akram Khan (president of the PML's provincial branch), Yusuf Ali Chowdhury (general-secretary of the PML's provincial branch), and Nurul Amin (chief minister of East Bengal) released a written campaign appeal. Moreover, an editorial written by editor Abul Kalam Shamsuddin was published in The Azad, owned by Khan. The editorial criticized Huq for violating party discipline by running against the party's official candidate.

During the by-election, a Huq supporter visited Bhashani in Dhubri Jail, located in the Indian state of Assam, and obtained his signature on Huq's election manifesto. Although the same manifesto with Bhasani's signature was printed and distributed for campaign purposes, it was later withdrawn from circulation, and all copies were destroyed.

== Result and reactions ==
Huq was elected in the by-election. It was reported that due to inclement weather, only a small percentage of voters were able to reach the polling stations. On 2 May 1949, The Azad reported that Huq had defeated Panni "by a narrow margin". However, according to leftist politician and historian Badruddin Umar, Huq had actually won by a large margin, and the newspaper attempted to downplay his victory.

In celebration of the by-election victory, a group of party workers held a reception for Shamsul Huq at a public meeting on 8 May 1949 in Victoria Park (Note: present-day Bahadur Shah Park.) in the provincial capital, Dacca. (Note: present-day Dhaka.) Reacting to the result, Manzur Alam, president of the Princely State Muslim League (PSML), demanded new elections for the Constituent Assembly, the Provincial Legislative Assembly, and the PML itself. He also stated: "The defeat of the Muslim League candidate in a by-election in East Bengal is very significant. This election proves that the Muslim League no longer represents all Muslims." On the other hand, Chaudhry Khaliquzzaman, president of the PML, asserted that the party had not lost public trust. He claimed that despite being a one-party regime, the PML still represented the public.

== Aftermath ==
During the election campaign, some distributed copies of Shamsul Huq's manifesto reached the government. Following the announcement of the results, the government filed a case to annul the by-election. As the manifesto had not been approved by the prison authorities of Dhubri Jail, the plaintiff claimed that Bhashani's signature was forged. A tribunal of three members was formed for the case, and it ordered that Huq not be granted his seat until the case was resolved. Later, Huseyn Shaheed Suhrawardy, convenor of the All-Pakistan Awami League, came to Dacca to represent Huq in court. In 1950, the court declared the by-election null and void.

Alarmed by the result of the by-election, the East Bengal government refrained from organizing any by-elections for the 35 vacant seats in the province until 1954. The unprecedented victory in the by-election encouraged the grassroots workers of the provincial Muslim League. As a result of which, before the by-election was officially annulled, on 23 June 1949, Shamsul Huq, along with several other members of the PML, formed the East Pakistan Awami Muslim League (later the East Pakistan Awami League, abbreviated as AL). (Note: At that time, Huq was made the general secretary of the newly formed party.) On 4 December 1953, with the goal of contesting the 1954 provincial election, the AL joined with the Krishak Sramik Party (KSP), Nizam-e-Islam Party (NIP), and Ganatantri Dal (GD) to form an alliance called the United Front (UF). The alliance issued a 21-point manifesto, the final point of which included a promise to organize a by-election within every three months of a provincial seat becoming vacant.
