= Fazlur Rahman Faruque =

Bangladeshi politician (1944–2024)

- ফজলুর রহমান ফারুক

Member of Parliament for Tangail-8
- In office 7 April 1973 – 6 November 1975
- Preceded by: Position created
- Succeeded by: Morshed Ali Khan Panni

Personal details
- Born: 12 October 1944; Kahela village, Mirzapur Upazila, East Bengal, British Raj
- Died: 19 October 2024 (aged 80); Tangail, Bangladesh
- Political party: Bangladesh Awami League
- Children: Khan Ahmed Shuvo

Fazlur Rahman Faruque (12 October 1944 – 19 October 2024) was an Awami League politician and a former Jatiya Sangsad member representing the Tangail-8 constituency during 1973–1975. He received the Ekushey Padak in 2021 for his contribution to the Bangladesh Liberation War. From 2017 to until death, he has served as president of the Tangail District unit of the Awami League. He was the district council administrator of Tangail District.

== Early life ==
Faruque was born on 12 October 1944 in Kahela village, Mirzapur Upazila, Tangail, East Bengal, British Raj.

== Career ==
Faruque was a member of the Chhatra League in the 1960s.

Faruque served in the Constituent Assembly of Bangladesh. He was elected to the parliament in 1973 from Tangail-8 as an Awami League candidate.

Faruque contested the 1991 parliamentary election from Tangail-7 as a candidate of the Awami League. He received 41,392 and came second to Kh. Badar Uddin of the Bangladesh Nationalist Party who received 62,882 votes.

In 2008, he served as the general secretary of the Tangail District unit of Awami League. In 2015, he supported citizens protesting the proposed addition of Tangail District to Mymensingh Division instead preferring the present Dhaka Division. He was elected president of the Tangail District Awami League on 18 October 2015 at the triennial conference of the Tangail district unit of Awami League.

The triennial conference of the Tangail district unit of Awami League was held in November 2022 seven years after the last one in 2015 and Faruque was re-elected president of the district unit. On 24 December 2022, Faruque proposed the name of Sheikh Hasina to be the president of Awami League at its council. She went on to win her 10th consecutive term as president.

== Personal life and death ==
Faruque's only son Khan Ahmed Shuvo is member of parliament from Tangail-7; elected in 2021 by-election called after the death of incumbent Ekabbar Hossain. On 19 October 2024, he died from old age complication in Tangail city.
