= Khurram Khan Panni =

Bengali politician (1921-1997)

- খুররম খান পন্নী

Ambassador of Bangladesh to Indonesia
- In office 29 May 1972 – 14 June 1975
- Preceded by: Position created
- Succeeded by: A. H. S. Ataul Karim

Ambassador of Pakistan to the Philippines
- In office 1971–1971

High Commissioner of Pakistan to Kenya
- In office 1963–1966
- Preceded by: Abdul Ghayur
- Succeeded by: Raziur Rahman Noore

Chief Whip of the East Pakistan Provincial Assembly
- In office 1962–1965

Personal details
- Born: 16 November 1921
- Died: 25 January 1997 (aged 75) Seattle, Washington, United States
- Party: Muslim League
- Children: Morshed Ali Khan Panni; Wajid Ali Khan Panni
- Parent: Masud Ali Khan Panni (father)
- Relatives: Wajed Ali Khan Panni (grandfather); Abdul Halim Ghaznavi (grandfather); Bayazeed Khan Panni (cousin)

Khurram Khan Panni (16 November 1921 – 25 January 1997) was the Chief Whip of the East Pakistan Provincial Assembly. He served as an ambassador of Pakistan to Argentina, Philippines, and Kenya, and as the first ambassador of the newly independent Bangladesh to Indonesia.

== Background and education ==
Khurram Khan Panni was born on 16 November 1921 to Masud Ali Khan Panni. His grandfather, Wajed Ali Khan Panni, was the zamindar of Karatia from the present day Tangail District region of Bangladesh. The family descended from a Pashtuns belonging to the Panni tribe, who had migrated from Afghanistan to Bengal in the 16th century. His maternal grandfather was Abdul Halim Ghaznavi, for whom he worked as a private secretary.

Panni studied at St. Paul's School, Darjeeling, St. Xavier's Collegiate School, and Presidency College, Kolkata.

== Career ==
Panni was elected to Bengal Legislative Assembly in 1946 but was unseated as he was underage, below 25. Later he contested in the January 1948 by-election from Tangail against Abdul Hamid Khan Bhasani but his nomination was terminated as he hid his real age from the authority.

Panni contested the April 1949 election from the same area as a Muslim League candidate against former Muslim League politician Shamsul Huq. On 26 April 1949, he lost the election to Huq for representing Nagarpur, Mirzapur and Basail.

In 1954, Panni lost the election to Sheikh Mujibur Rahman, candidate of the United Front.

In 1962, Panni was elected to the East Pakistan Provincial Assembly and went on to become whip of the ruling party.

In 1963, Panni was appointed the High Commissioner of Pakistan to Kenya.

During Bangladesh Liberation War, Panni served as the ambassador of Pakistan to the Philippines in 1971. He declared allegiance to Bangladesh during the war along with two other Bengali Pakistan ambassadors, Abdul Momin and Abul Fateh.

In 1974, Panni was appointed the ambassador of Bangladesh to Indonesia. He retired in 1975 and moved to Seattle, Washington, United States.
