= Tofael Ahmad (folklorist) =

Bangladeshi folk art researcher (1919–2002)

Tofail Ahmed
- তোফায়েল আহমদ
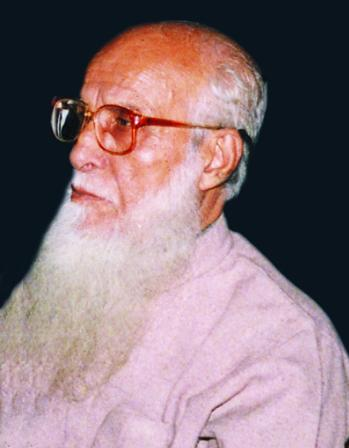
- Born: 22 February 1919; Lakshmipur District, Bengal Presidency, British India
- Died: 28 March 2002 (aged 83)
- Education: University of Calcutta
- Occupations: Writer, researcher, academic

Tofail Ahmed (22 February 1919 – 28 March 2002) was a well-known Bangladeshi researcher of Folk Art. He was also a collector of Folk artifacts and has authored several books on Bangladeshi Folk arts and Crafts. He was awarded the Shilu Abed Karushilpa Award for his contribution to Folk Arts and Craft in 1998. He was also elected as an honorary fellow of the Bangla Academy in 2001.

== Early life and career ==
Ahmed was educated at University of Calcutta where he completed his MA in Economics in 1944. He started his teaching career at Calcutta Islamia College. He also taught at Chakhar College in Barisal. He later moved to Government Saadat College in Karatia Union where he was the Principal of the college for seventeen years. In 1980 he retired as director of the Bangladesh Council.

== Major contributions ==
Ahmed made significant contributions to Bangladeshi folk art. He has collected and preserved many specimens of folk artifacts which are now extinct. During 1984–1987, as part of the Karika project on Folk crafts and design documentation, he visited about 1500 villages all over Bangladesh and collected rare Folk artifacts. Here he discovered the rare Gazir Pat, which is a form of scroll painting used to illustrate the life of Gazi Pir. Previously, it was believed that the only preserved piece of this art was at the Asutosh Museum of Indian Art in Calcutta. Ahmed established a private folk museum in his private residence in Lalmatia, Dhaka. It has been open to public ever since.

== Bibliography ==
- Amader Prachin Shilpa (Our ancient crafts and industries) 1964
- Lokashilpa (Folk arts and crafts) 1985
- Yuge Yuge Bangladesh (Bangladesh through the ages) 1992
- Lokashilper Bhubane (In the realm of folk art) 1993
- Dhakar Banijyik Karukala (The commercial crafts of Dhaka) 1993
- Loka Aitihyer Dash Diganta (Ten dimensions of folk tradition) 1999
