= Jaleswar (disambiguation) =

Jaleswar is a town in the Balasore district of state Odisha, India

Jaleswar may also refer to

- Jaleswar, Assam, a town in the north east state of Assam, India
- Jaleswar, Assam (Vidhan Sabha constituency)
- Jaleswar, Odisha (Vidhan Sabha constituency)

== See also ==
- Jaleshwar, a municipality in Janakpur Zone, Nepal
