= Hezbut Tawheed =

Bangladeshi religious reform movement

- হেযবুত তওহীদ
- Logo of Hezbut Tawheed
- Formation: 16 February 1995; 31 years ago
- Founder: Muhammad Bayazeed Khan Panni
- Founded at: Daud Mahal, Karatia, Tangail
- Type: Religious organization
- Headquarters: Dhaka, Bangladesh
- Location: Bangladesh
- Emam: Hossain Mohammad Salim
- Website: hezbuttawheed.org

Hezbut Tawheed (Bengali: হেযবুত তওহীদ) is an Islamic reformist religious organization based in Bangladesh. It was founded on 16 February 1995 by Muhammad Bayazeed Khan Panni in Tangail. Following his death in 2012, Hossain Mohammad Salim became its Emam.

Hezbut Tawheed is not included in the Bangladesh Financial Intelligence Unit's published Domestic Sanction List of formally proscribed organizations.

In April 2025, Daily Desherpotro, citing Ministry of Home Affairs sources, reported that no official record of a corresponding blacklisting order was available. In May 2025, Daily Sun reported the organization's public rejection of the designation.

== Legal status ==
A January 2015 Bangladesh Bank circular described Hezbut Tawheed as blacklisted and forwarded government correspondence concerning attendance at events associated with the organization.

A Bangladesh Police investigation manual also mentions Hezbut Tawheed alongside groups described as banned in a section discussing the use of intelligence reports in criminal investigations.

The Bangladesh Financial Intelligence Unit's published Domestic Sanction List does not include Hezbut Tawheed.

== History ==
Muhammad Bayazeed Khan Panni, the head of the Panni family from Tangail, founded Hezbut Tawheed on 16 February 1995 and served as its imam.

After the death of Panni in 2012, Hossain Mohammad Salim from the Noakhali District took oath as the Emam of the organization. According to its website, it has offices and organizational activities in all the districts of Bangladesh.

== Controversy ==
Despite claims that the organisation is working against militancy and communalism, the group was blacklisted by Bangladeshi law enforcing agencies in 2008 for association with militants. Bangladesh Bank also issued a warning to the banking sectors of Bangladesh against joining any programmes organised by the group or its associated bodies.

The organisation has been criticised for publishing and preaching Quranist ideology.
