= Abdul Hamid Khan Yusufzai =

Bengali writer (1845–1915)

- আবদুল হামিদ খান ইউসফজয়ী
- Born: 1845; Charan, Kalihati, Tangail, Bengal Presidency
- Died: 1915 (aged 69–70); Dhaka
- Occupations: Poet, journalist, author
- Known for: The Ahmadi
- Spouse: Azizunnisa
- Relatives: Nowsher Ali Khan Yusufzai

Abdul Ḥamīd Khān Yūsufzaī (Bengali: আবদুল হামিদ খান ইউসফজয়ী; 1845–1915) was a Bengali writer, journalist, and politician.

== Early life ==
Yusufzai was born in 1845 to a Bengali Muslim family from the village of Charan in Kalihati, Tangail, Bengal Presidency, British Raj (now in Bangladesh). His family traced their ancestry to Pashtuns of the Yusufzai tribe, who had migrated from Afghanistan to Bengal and become culturally assimilated. He worked as an estate manager at the Delduar zamindar estate in Tangail along with notable writer Mir Mosharraf Hossain. He was married to Aziz-un-Nisa.

== Career ==
Yusufzai was a progressive journalist who published a secular fortnightly, The Ahmadi (unrelated to the Ahmadiyya movement). The first issue came out in 1886. The Ahmadi was supported by Karimunnessa Khanam Chowdhurani, the wife of Abdul Hakim Khan Ghaznawi, the Zamindar of Delduar. He and The Ahmadi fought a lawsuit against the Akhbare Islamia magazine over the Hanafi-La-Mazhabi and slaughter of cows.

He worked with Surendranath Banerjee. He joined the Indian National Congress, the Swadeshi movement, and other anti-British activities. His first book, Sarsangraha, was published in 1887.

== Death ==
Yusufzai died in 1915.
