= Karatia Zamindari =

Zamindari family based in the Tangail District of Bangladesh

Zamindars of Karatia করটিয়ার জমিদার
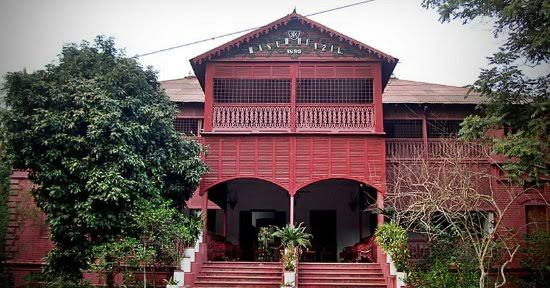
- Masud Manzil, Karatia Zamindari
- Current region: Karatia, Tangail District, Dhaka Division, Bangladesh
- Earlier spellings: Pannis of Karatia
- Origin: Afghanistan
- Founded: 17th century
- Founder: Bayazid Khan Panni
- Current head: Wajed Ali Khan Panni II
- Members: Wajed I Khurram; Humayun; Bayazeed; Morshed
- Connected families: Dhaka Nawab family Dhanbari Nawab family Ghaznavi family
- Estate: Karatia Waqf Estate

Karatia Zamindari (Bengali: করটিয়া জমিদারী, romanized: Korotiya Zomidari) was a zamindari family based in the Tangail District of Bangladesh.

== History ==
The Keratia Zamindari was founded in the early 1600s by Bayazid Khan Panni of the Panni Family. In the 19th century, the head of the zamindari, Sadat Ali Khan Panni, faced legal difficulties in controlling the family asset. He regained control of the property with the help of Khwaja Alimullah of the Dhaka Nawab family. They had a falling-out and Khwaja Alimullah sued Sadat Ali Khan Panni. Alimullah got a ruling in his favor, but Panni transferred the property to his wife, Jamrudunnesa Khanam. They resolved the dispute mutually and Alimullah received seven anna (seven-sixteenth) of the estate.

Sadat Ali Khan Panni and Jamrudunnesa Khanam donated 50 percent of their property to create Waqf trust that would carry out charitable actions. Their son, Hafez Mahmud Ali Khan Panni, was made the mutawalli (manager) of the Waqf after the death of Sadat Ali Khan Panni. After the death of Hafez Mahmud Ali Khan Panni his son, Wajed Ali Khan Panni, and mother, Jamrudunnesa Khanam, fought in court over the control of the trust. Wajed Ali Khan Panni was awarded the control of the trust by the court.

Wajed Ali Khan Panni was a successful administrator who expanded the estate. In 1901, he established the Hafez Mahmud Ali Institution in Karatia. In 1906, the All Bengal Muslim Education Conference was held in Karatia through his initiative. He served as the vice-president of the Bengal Provincial Congress Committee and the Mymensingh district Congress. In 1921, he was jailed by the British Rsj for criticizing the colonial administration. He donated large sections of the estate and its income to charity and educational institutions. In 1926, he founded Saadat College and Rokeya High Madrasa. He died in 1936. Hafez Mahmud Ali Khan Panni sponsored the Akhbare Islamia, a monthly journal. The estate publication house published a number of books on history. Rokeya Mahal and Daud Mahal are the only estates of the zamindari that survived.

== Notable members ==
- Wajed Ali Khan Panni (1871–1936)
- Khurram Khan Panni, former chief whip of East Pakistan Provincial Assembly
- Humayun Khan Panni (d. 2006)
- Muhammad Bayazeed Khan Panni (1925–2012)
- Wajed Ali Khan Panni II
- Morshed Ali Khan Panni

== See also ==
- Karatia Union
