= Wajid Ali Khan Panni =

Bangladeshi politician

Member of Parliament of Tangail-7
- Preceded by: Khaju Mia
- Succeeded by: Kh. Badar Uddin

Personal details
- Party: Jatiya Party (Ershad)
- Parent: Khurram Khan Panni (father)
- Relatives: Wajed Ali Khan Panni (great grandfather), Humayun Khan Panni (uncle), Morshed Ali Khan Panni (brother)

Wajid Ali Khan Panni, also known as Wajed Ali Khan Panni II, was a Jatiya Party (Ershad) politician and a former member of parliament for Tangail-7.

== Early life and family ==
Wajid Ali Khan Panni was born in Mirzapur, Tangail District, to the Bengali Muslim family known as the Zamindars of Karatia. His father, Khurram Khan Panni, was the chief whip of the East Pakistan Provincial Assembly. Panni's brother is Morshed Ali Khan Panni who is also a politician. His great-grandfather, Wajed Ali Khan Panni I, was descended from a Pashtun belonging to the Panni tribe, who had migrated from Afghanistan to Bengal in the 16th century where the family became culturally assimilated.

Panni is a syndicate member of Independent University, Bangladesh.

== Career ==
Panni was elected to parliament from Tangail-7 as a Jatiya Party candidate in 1986 and 1988.
