= Muhammad Naimuddin =

Bengali Islamic scholar (1832–1907/16)

Alim ad-Dahr Moulvi Muhammad Naimuddin
- মোহাম্মদ নইমুদ্দীন

Personal life
- Born: 1832 Tangail, Bengal Presidency
- Died: November 23, 1907 (aged 74–75) Tangail, Bengal Presidency
- Occupation: Writer, philanthropist

Religious life
- Religion: Islam
- Denomination: Sunni
- Jurisprudence: Hanafi

Muhammad Naimuddin (Bengali: মোহাম্মদ নইমুদ্দীন; 1832–1907/1916) was a Bengali Islamic scholar, writer, and journalist. He was the chief editor of the Akhbare Islamia.

== Early life and education ==
Muhammad Naimuddin was born in 1832 to a Bengali Muslim family in the village of Shuruj in Tangail, Mymensingh District, Bengal Presidency.

He completed his initial education at the Dulai Madrasa in Sujanagar, Pabna District, and also completed Islamic studies in Dhaka. He later traveled through Murshidabad, Bihar, Allahabad, Agra, Delhi, and other places to gain further religious knowledge. He was awarded the title of 'Alem-ud-Dahar' for his specialization in Islamic knowledge.

== Career ==
Naimuddin had numerous careers in his life. He was a school teacher as well as a qazi (marriage registrar) whilst in Pabna.

He finally started concentrating on publishing magazines, writing books and spreading the message of Islam under the patronage of the Panni zamindars of Karatia.

The family employed Naimuddin as the editor of the Akhbare Islamia journal. Aside from that, he began working on translating the entire Quran into Bengali language.

== Works ==
Naimuddin had written around 30 books relating to religion. The first volume of his translation of the Quran was published on 26 September 1891. From 1892 to 1908, he published the translation of 9 paras. In 1892, he also released a four-volume Bengali translation of the Fatwa-e-Alamgir with the assistance of Wajed Ali Khan Panni and patronage of Hafez Mahmud Ali Khan Panni. He was made the chief editor of the Bengali monthly Akhbare Islamia in 1883, published from the Mahmudia Press. These works were sponsored by the Zamindar of Karatia Hafez Mahmud Ali Khan Panni. Some of his other notable books include:

- Kalematul Kufr (1897)
- Esabat-e-Akher Zohar (1897)
- Adella-e-Hanifiyyah (1897)
- Ensaf (1892)
- Rafa-Yadayn (1896)
- Ma'dan al-Uloom
- Yusuf Surar Subistrirno Tafsir
- Sirat al-Mustaqim
- Seratul Mustaqim (New Edition)
- Dhormer Lathi
- Dhokabhavjan (1896)
- Bukhari Sharif (1898)
- Moulud Sharif (1895)
- Beter
- Tarabih
- Jubda al-Masail (1873)
- Fatwa-e-Alamgiri
- Saheeh Shah Alomer Kiccha
- Saheeh Alomgirer Kiccha
- Saheeh Noorjahan Begomer Kiccha
- Saheeh Alauddiner Kiccha
- Saheeh Husain Shaher Kiccha
- Gokando
- Gomasta Darpan (1886)
- Go-Jiban (1889), in response to Mir Mosharraf Hossain's call for discontinuing sacrificing cows

== Death ==
There is difference of opinion as to what year Naimuddin died. Wakil Ahmed of Banglapedia claims it was on 23 November 1907 in his home village, while others say 1916.
