= Muhammad Bayazeed Khan Panni =

Founder of Hezbut Tawheed

Imamuzaman Muhammad Bayazeed Khan Panni
- মোহাম্মদ বায়াজীদ খান পন্নী
- Panni (second from left) in 1963, following his election to the Provincial Assembly

Imam of Hezbut Tawheed
- In office 16 February 1995 – 16 January 2012
- Preceded by: Position established
- Succeeded by: Hossain Mohammad Salim

Personal details
- Born: March 11, 1925 Karatia, Tangail, British Raj
- Died: January 16, 2012 (aged 86) Dhaka, Bangladesh
- Resting place: Gorai Majar, Karatia, Tangail, Bangladesh
- Citizenship: British Indian (1925–1947); East Pakistani (1947–1971); Bangladeshi (1971–2012)
- Party: Convention Muslim League

Bayazeed Khan Panni (Bengali: বায়াজীদ খান পন্নী; 1925–2012) was a Bangladeshi politician, homeopathic medicine practitioner, writer, and religious reformer. He was a member of the East Pakistan Provincial Assembly from 1963 to 1965. He founded the religious group Hezbut Tawheed.

== Biography ==
Panni was born on 11 March 1925 in Tangail. The Panni family were rural aristocrats, the zamindars of Karatia.

He studied at Islamia College, Calcutta, but left college without completing a degree.

Unsuccessful in business, he studied homeopathy and became a homeopathic practitioner.

Panni (second from left, with a garland of flowers over his arm) in 1963, after being elected to the provincial assembly

In 1963, he stood in a by-election for the Mymensingh-II (Tangail-Basail) constituency of the East Pakistan Provincial Assembly. It had been vacated by Khurram Khan Panni when he was appointed High Commissioner to Nigeria. An independent candidate, he was elected with support from the Convention Muslim League and then joined their party. In the 1965 Pakistani provincial election, he stood for the Mymensingh-I seat. He finished third behind Humayun Khan Panni.

The next year, his book Bagh-ban-Banduk [Tiger-forest-gun] was published.

Panni left Bangladesh soon after it gained independence. Political scientist Ali Riaz wrote that he reportedly did so because he disliked the government and secularist policies. He frequently visited the Middle East. According to Anurag Tripathi, a professor of international relations, Panni "developed connections with many fanatic religious groups ... during his stay abroad". In the 1980s, Panni returned to Bangladesh.

Sometime between 1992 and 1995, he founded Hezbut Tawheed. It refers to itself as a movement to "propagate the true teachings of Islam". Others classify it as a militant Islamist organization or an Islamist terrorist group.

Panni wrote books and pamphlets to guide his followers. His 1996 book E Islam Islam-e Noy [This is not the same Islam] called for "a return to the Islam preached during the Prophet’s era". Bangladesh banned the book on 10 May 1998.

Panni died on 16 January 2012.
