= Ibrahim Khan (writer) =

- ইবরাহীম খাঁ

Member of the Bengal Legislative Assembly
- In office 1946–1947
- Preceded by: Syed Hasan Ali Chowdhury
- Succeeded by: Abdul Hamid Khan Bhashani
- Constituency: Tangail North (Madhupur-Gopalpur)

Personal details
- Born: c. 1894 Shabaj Nagar, Tangail District, Bengal Presidency, British India
- Died: 29 March 1978 (aged 83–84) Dhaka, Bangladesh
- Education: St. Paul's Cathedral Mission College; Calcutta University
- Occupation: Writer, educator, activist

Ibrahim Khan (often referred as Principal Ibrahim Khan; c. 1894 – 29 March 1978) was a Bangladeshi litterateur. He was awarded Ekushey Padak in 1977 by the Government of Bangladesh.

== Early life and education ==
Khan was born in Shabaj Nagar in Tangail District. He passed the entrance examination from Pingna High School and FA from Ananda Mohan College in 1912 and 1914 respectively. He earned his bachelor's from St. Paul's Cathedral Mission College in 1916 and master's from Calcutta University as a private candidate. He obtained his law degree in 1918.

== Career ==
Khan started his career as headmaster of Karatia High School, Tangail district in 1919.

Khan participated in activities like Khelafat Andolon, Asohojog Andolon and Rayet Mohajon Birodhi Andolon. He was elected as the member of the Provincial Assembly and Constituent Assembly in 1945 and 1953 respectively. In November 1947, a memorandum demanding that Bangla be adopted as the state language of East Bengal was signed by a number of Bangalee intellectuals including Khan. In 1962, he was elected as a member of the national assembly (MNA).

Khan was the founding member and the first principal of Sadat College in Karatia, Tangail. He worked in the college until 1947.

Based on the life events of the Turkish president Mustafa Kemal Atatürk, Khan published a serialised drama, entitled "Kamal Pasha", in 1926.

== Works ==
- Kamal Pasha (1927)
- Anwar Pasha (1939)
- Istambul Yatrir Patra (1954)
- Beduiner Deshe (1956)
- Byaghra Mama (1951)
- Rn Parishodh (1955)
- Batayan (1967)

== Legacy ==
Khan received the titles of "Khan Sahib" and "Khan Bahadur" from the British government and the "Sitara-i-Imtiaz" from the Pakistani government. He won the Bangla Academy Literary Award in 1963 for his contribution to drama and the Ekushey Padak in 1976 for literature. Khan had one daughter, Khaleda Habib. His granddaughter Gultekin Khan was married to writer and filmmaker Humayun Ahmed.
