= Khaju Mia =

Bangladeshi politician

Member of Bangladesh Parliament
- In office 1979–1986
- Preceded by: Shawkat Ali Khan
- Succeeded by: Wajid Ali Khan Panni

Personal details
- Party: Bangladesh Nationalist Party

Khaju Mia is a Bangladesh Nationalist Party politician and a former member of parliament of Tangail-7.

== Career ==
Mia was elected to parliament from Tangail-7 as a Bangladesh Nationalist Party candidate in 1979.
