= Humayun Khan Panni =

Bangladeshi politician (?-2006)

Member of Parliament
- In office 12 October 1991 – 19 March 1996
- Preceded by: Morshed Ali Khan Panni
- Succeeded by: Abdul Kader Siddique
- Constituency: Tangail-8

6th Deputy Speaker of the Jatiya Sangsad
- In office 12 October 1991 – 19 March 1996
- Speaker: Sheikh Razzak Ali
- Preceded by: Sheikh Razzak Ali
- Succeeded by: L. K. Siddiqi

Personal details
- Born: 1920-1921
- Died: 11 May 2006 (aged 85) Apollo Hospital Dhaka, Bangladesh
- Party: Bangladesh Nationalist Party
- Relatives: Wajed Ali Khan Panni (great-grandfather), Morshed Ali Khan Panni (nephew), Wajid Ali Khan Panni (nephew)

Humayun Khan Panni (died 11 May 2006) was a Bangladeshi politician and deputy speaker of parliament from 1991 to 1996.

== Early life and family ==
Humayun Khan Panni was born in the early 1920s, to the Bengali Muslim family known as the Zamindars of Karatia. His ancestors were Pashtuns belonging to the Panni tribe, and had migrated from Afghanistan to Bengal in the 16th century where they became culturally assimilated.

== Career ==
During the 1991 Bangladeshi general election, Panni won the Tangail-8 seat as a Bangladesh Nationalist Party candidate. He served for a second term after the February 1996 Bangladeshi general election.

Panni's wife was murdered on 19 May 2003 in their residence in Dhanmondi.

== Death ==
Panni died on 11 May 2006 at the Apollo Hospital Dhaka in Bangladesh.
