= Abdul Karim Ghaznavi =

Bengali politician and zamindar (1872–1939)

Sir Abdul Karim Ghaznavi
- Born: 25 August 1872; Tangail, Bengal, British India (now Dhaka, Bangladesh)
- Died: 24 July 1939 (aged 66); Ballygunge, Calcutta, Bengal, British India (now West Bengal, India)
- Resting place: Delduar, Dhaka, Bangladesh
- Citizenship: British India
- Education: London University
- Occupations: Zamindar, politician
- Organization: Central National Mohammedan Association
- Notable work: Pilgrim Traffic to the Hedjaz and Palestine, Muslim Education in Bengal, The Working of the Dyarchial System in Bengal
- Parent(s): Abdul Hakim Khan Ghaznavi (father); Karimunnesa Khanam Chaudhurani (mother)
- Relatives: Abdul Halim Ghaznavi (brother); Begum Rokeya (aunt)
- Awards: Knight (1928), Nawab Bahadur (1933)

Sir Abdul Karim Ghaznavi (25 August 1872 – 24 July 1939) was a British Indian politician, traveler, minister, member of Bengal Governor's Executive Council, Bengal Provincial Council and Central Legislative Assembly, reformer of Muslim education and one of the pioneer of Muslim renaissance in Bengal. He was involved in Central National Mohammedan Association founded by Syed Ameer Ali.

== Early life and education ==
Abdul Karim Khan Ghaznavi was born in a Zamindar Khan family of Delduar, Tangail in Bengal Presidency. His father was Abdul Hakim Khan Ghaznavi and mother was Karimunnesa Khanam. Their ancestor Fatehdad Khan Ghaznavi Lohani had arrived to Bengal from Ghazni in Afghanistan and was from the Lohani tribe of the Pashtun people, this ancestor had established a Zamindari, Abdul Hakim Ghaznavi had inherited factions of this zamindari in Delduar.

Abdul Karim Ghaznavi studied in St. Peter's School of Devonshire in England, Wren and Gurney's Institution and London University. Then he studied for a short period in Jena University of Germany. While travelling Europe he visited many educational institutions. He participated in ICS examination in 1890. His mother inspired him for education.

== Politics ==
During Partition of Bengal of 1905 he got involved in politics. He supported the partition decision. When the Congress leaders started movement against partition Abdul Karim protested this movement. Because of this Congress leadership named him "wrong Ghaznavi". On the other hand, governor of newly established province Sir Joseph Bampfylde Fuller named him "right Ghaznavi". He was a member of Imperial Legislative Council from East Bengal and Assam province between 1909 and 1912. From 1913 to 1916 he was a government nominated member of Viceroy's council from Muslim constituency of Bengal Presidency. In his tenure he was appointed to handle Hajj management। To discuss on travel of pilgrims British Indian government sent him to the then ruler of Mecca Hussein bin Ali. Then he also visited Syria and Palestine.

He was one of the non-government members of Mohammedan Education Advisory Committee created on 30 June 1918 to improve Muslim education. Abdul Karim emphasized on education of technology and commerce for the Muslims. Government of India Act 1919 was introduced to increase participation of the Indians in government. He was elected member of Bengal provincial legislative council from Mymensingh south-west Muslim constituency in the second election for 1924–1926 tenure. In third election held for 1927–1929 tenure he was also elected. He served as minister for two months in his first tenure and for seen months in his second tenure.

In 1924 he commented before Administration reform inquiry committee that European style democracy would be harmful for Indian Muslims. He supported Simon Commission. Under his leadership a group of 15 Muslim leaders gave joint statement in newspaper to support Simon commission. In 1928 he became the president of Bengal Simon Committee. In 1929 he was appointed president of All Indian Provincial Simon Committees. Abdul Karim was member of Bengal Executive Council from April 1929 to 9 May 1934. On 10 May 1934 he retired from politics.

== Awards ==
He was awarded Knighthood in 1928. Later in 1933 he received Nawab Bahadur title.

== Personal life ==
Sir Abdul Halim Ghuznavi was his younger brother. Begum Rokeya was his maternal aunt.

== Death ==
Sir Abdul Karim Ghaznavi died on 24 July 1939 at his home in Baliganj, Calcutta. He was buried in his family graveyard of his village.

== Works ==
- Pilgrim Traffic to the Hedjaz and Palestine,
- Muslim Education in Bengal
- The Working of the Dyarchial System in Bengal
