= Abul Kalam Azad Siddiqui =

Bangladesh Nationalist Party Politician

Member of Bangladesh Parliament
- In office 1996–2001
- Preceded by: Kh. Badar Uddin
- Succeeded by: Md. Akabbar Hossain

Personal details
- Party: Bangladesh Nationalist Party

Abul Kalam Azad Siddiqui is a Bangladesh Nationalist Party politician and a former member of parliament for Tangail-7.

== Career ==
Siddiqui was elected to parliament from Tangail-7 as a Bangladesh Nationalist Party candidate in 1996. After that, he lost to Awami League candidate Md. Akabbar Hossain in 2001 and 2008.
