= The Ahmadi =

Historic fortnightly magazine published in Tangai, Bangladesh

The Ahmadi was a historic fortnightly magazine published in Tangail.

== History ==
The Ahmadi was first published in 1886. It was financially supported by Karimunnesa Khanam Chaudhurani and edited by Abdul Hamid Khan Yusufzai. Karimunnesa Khanam Chaudhurani was the wife of Abdul Halim Khan Ghaznavi, the Zamidar of Delduar. It was published from Delduar, Tangail and would often engage in debated with Tangail-based contemporary periodical Akhbare Islamia. Mir Mosharraf Hossain, the manager of Delduar Zamindari estate, would often contribute to the Ahmadi. The magazine wrote about religion, politics, and social events. In 1889 it was renamed to Ahmadi O Nabaratna.
