= Abdul Halim Ghaznavi =

Indian politician, zamindar and industrialist (1876–1953)

Sir Abdul Halim Khan Ghuznavi
- আবদুল হালিম গজনবী
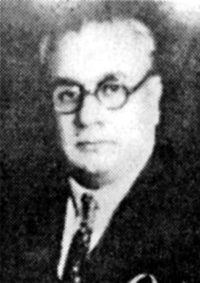

Member of Central Legislative Assembly
- In office 1930–1945
- Preceded by: Constituency established
- Succeeded by: Tamizuddin Khan
- Constituency: Dacca cum Mymensingh
- In office 1926–1930
- Preceded by: Khwaja Abdul Karim; Alimuzzaman Chowdhury
- Constituency: Dacca Rural

Personal details
- Born: 11 November 1876 Delduar, Bengal, British India
- Died: 18 June 1953 (aged 76) Delduar, East Bengal, Pakistan
- Party: All India Muslim League
- Parent: Karimunnesa Khanam Chaudhurani (mother)
- Relatives: Abdul Karim Ghaznavi (brother); Begum Rokeya (aunt); Khurram Khan Panni (grandson)
- Education: St. Xavier's College, Kolkata

Sir Abdul Halim Khan Ghuznavi (1876 – 1953), also spelled Sir Abdul Halim Ghaznavi, was a Bengali politician, zamindar, and industrialist. He was a member of the Central Legislative Assembly of British India.

== Early life ==
Abdul Halim was born in Delduar, Tangail, Bengal on 11 November 1876 in the Delduar Zamidar Family. His parents were Karimunnesa Khanam and Abdul Hakim Khan Ghuznavi. His brother was Abdul Karim Ghuznavi. He graduated from City School and St. Xavier's College of Calcutta.

== Career ==
Abdul Halim began his political career in 1905 and diligently explored several divergent political avenues for his peoples. Initially he opposed the administrative reorganization of Bengal done by Lord Curzon in 1905. He attended the conference of the Bengal Provincial Congress held on 14 and 15 April 1906 at Barisal, and the 23rd session of the All-India National Congress held on 26–27 December 1907 at Surat. But soon he became disillusioned and distanced himself from the Congress politics.

Shortly thereafter, Abdul Halim was elected a member of the Legislative Assembly from the Rural Muslim Constituency of the Dhaka in 1927 as an independent candidate. He presided over the All India Muslim League Conference held in Kanpur in 1929. He attended all the three Round Table Conferences held in London in 1930, 1931 and 1932 as a delegate of the All India Muslim League. In the Round Table Conferences, he was a member of the Burma Sub Committee along with U Aung Thin and others. The job of the committee was to consider the nature of the conditions which would enable Burma to be separated from British India on equitable terms. The Burma Sub Committee met in December 1930 in London and presented at the Round Table Conference on January 16, 1930, where the principle of separation of Burma was accepted. Abdul Halim was again elected a member of the Central Legislative Assembly from the Rural Muslim Constituency of the Dhaka-Mymensingh in 1931 and in 1935 continuing as an independent candidate.

In 1936, he became a founding member and secretary of the all India independent Democratic Party along with Khabeeruddin Ahmed, Anwar-ul-Azim and 11 other members of the Central Legislative Assembly. But soon thereafter he firmly joined the All India Muslim League. He maintained his elected positions from 1927 to 1945.

Abdul Halim started his career in 1900 as the chairman of the Mymensingh Municipality. He was also an Honorary Magistrate of Mymensingh. He was involved in the publication of The Musalman and The Star of India, both newspapers were aligned with the All India Muslim League.

== Honors and awards ==
Knight Grand Cross, Order of the Bath, on the birthday of King Emperor George V, Jun 3, 1935.

Abdul Halim was a Fellow of Calcutta University, Member of Dhaka University Court, Aligarh University Court, and Bengal Royal Asiatic Society.

A street was named after the former Sheriff of Calcutta.

== Death ==
Abdul Halim died on 18 June 1953 in Delduar, Tangail, East Pakistan.
