= Karimunnesa Khanam Chaudhurani =

Bengali poet (1855–1926)

- করিমুন্নেসা খানম চৌধুরানী
- Born: Karimunnesa Khanam Chaudhurani; 22 June 1855; Payraband, Bengal, British India (now Rangpur, Bangladesh)
- Died: 6 September 1926 (aged 71); Calcutta, Bengal, British India (now West Bengal, India)
- Occupation: Writer
- Children: Abdul Karim Ghaznavi; Abdul Halim Ghaznavi
- Parent(s): Zahiruddin Muhammad Abu Ali Saber (father); Rahatunnesa Sabera Chaudhurani (mother)
- Relatives: Begum Rokeya (sister)
- Writing career
- Language: Bengali
- Notable works: Mānas Bikāsh; Dukkha Tarangiṇī

Karimunnesa Khanam Chaudhurani (Bengali: করিমুন্নেসা খাঁনম চৌধুরানী; 1855 – 6 September 1926) was a Bengali poet, social worker, and patron of literature.

== Early life and family ==
Karimunnesa was born in 1855 into a Bengali Muslim family in Rangpur, Bengal Presidency, British Raj. Her father was Zahiruddin Muhammad Abu Ali Saber, the Zamindar of Payraband Pargana, and her mother was Rahatunnesa Sabera Chaudhurani. Her younger sister was Begum Rokeya.

Raised in a traditional Islamic household, Karimunnesa observed the purdah and her early education began with the Quran. She memorised Persian verses by listening in on her brothers lessons, and learnt English and Bengali through her own effort. At the age of 14, she married Abdul Hakim Khan Ghuznavi, the Zamindar of Delduar in Tangail. Her husband died when she reached the age of 23, leaving behind two sons.

== Career ==
Karimunnesa made sure her children were given a Western education. She had her children's schooling done in Kolkata. She sent Abdul Karim Ghaznavi, her eldest son to England when he was 13. Her second son, Abdul Halim Ghaznavi, studied at St. Xavier's College. Her sons would go on to become important and influential politicians in Bengal. She supported Begum Rokeya in her desire to study Bengali and literature. Karimunnesa's poetry were mostly about nature. She published two books, Mānas Bikāsh and Dukkha Tarangiṇī. She patronised the fortnightly magazine The Ahmadi, which was published by Abdul Hamid Khan Yusufzai. From 1884 to 1892, she served the estate manager of Delduar Estate. In 1885, Mir Mosharraf Hossain dedicated his book Bishad Shindhu to her. Begum Rokeya's book Motichur (Vol II) was dedicated to her as well. At the age of 67, Karimunnesa learnt the Arabic language in order to gain a better understanding of the Quran.

== Death ==
Karimunnesa died on 6 September 1926.
