= Nowsher Ali Khan Yusufzai =

- নওশের আলী খাঁন ইউসুফজয়ী
- Born: c. 1864; Charan, Tangail District, Bengal Presidency
- Died: May 9, 1924 (aged 59–60)
- Education: Pogose School; Dhaka College
- Occupation: writer
- Spouse: Rahimunnesa
- Relatives: Abdul Hamid Khan Yusufzai

Nowsher Ali Khan Yusufzai (Bengali: নওশের আলী খাঁন ইউসুফজয়ী; c. 1864 – 9 May 1924) was a Bengali writer and philanthropist.

== Early life and education ==
Yusufzai was born in 1864 to a Bengali Muslim family from the village of Charan in Kalihati, Tangail, Bengal Presidency, British Raj. His family traced their ancestry to Pashtuns of the Yusufzai tribe, who had migrated from Afghanistan to Bengal and become culturally assimilated.

Yusufzai passed the Entrance examination in 1881 from Pogose School in Dhaka and FA in 1887 from Dhaka College. He studied for the BA examination but unsuccessfully. Nevertheless, it can be said that he was the first Muslim to qualify for FA in Tangail district. While studying for his BA he married Rahimunnesa, a daughter of the zamindar of Pakulla.

== Career ==
Yusufzai was appointed to the post of Sub-Registrar of Pakulla in 1889 and was upgraded to Sub-Deputy Registrar in 1891. He was the first Muslim in this post in Tangail. He retired from his job in 1919.

Yusufzai was associated with different social and educational institutions of his locality and of Calcutta. He wrote books in prose and verse. Some of notable works are Bangiya Mussalman (1891), Shaishab Kusum (Poem, 1895), Dalil Registrari Shiksa (1897), Uchcha Bangala Shiksabidhi (1901), Notes on Mohammedan Education in Bengal (1903), Mussalman Jatiya Sangit (1909), Sahitya Pratibha (1914), Sahitya Shiksa (1915). Bangiya Mussalman and Notes on Mohammedan Education in Bengal reflect his social consciousness, national feeling, humanity, educational interests, economic and political sense, and earned his a place in society.

== Death ==
Yusufzai died on 9 May 1924.
