= Shamsul Huq =

Indian Bengali politician (1918–1965)

Shamsul Haq
- শামসুল হক
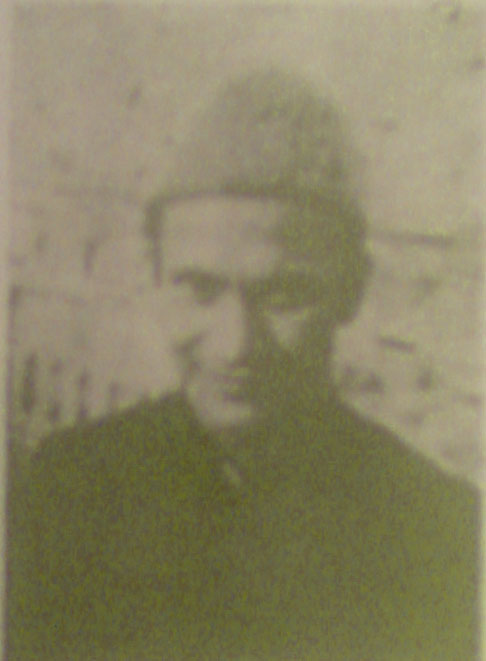
- Born: 1 February 1918; Delduar, Tangail, Bengal Presidency, British India
- Died: 1965
- Citizenship: British Indian (1918–1947); Pakistani (1947–1965)
- Known for: Politician
- Political party: Muslim League later Awami League
- Spouse: Late Afia Khatun

Shamsul Huq (1918–1965) was a Pakistani Bengali politician who led a parliamentary committee in the Constituent Assembly of Pakistan to advocate for the recognition of the Bengali language during the Language movement of the 1950s. He was also the first and third general secretary of the Awami League, which played a key role in Bengali nationalist movement in the 1950s and 1960s.

== Political career ==
Shamsul Huq contested the 1949 Tangail South by-election as an independent candidate against Muslim League politician Khurram Khan Panni. He was supported by the Muslim League politicians who demanded changes within the party's internal policies. On 26 April 1949, he won the election against Panni for representing Nagarpur, Mirzapur and Basail. The Awami League was formed on 23 June 1949 and Shamsul Huq became its first general secretary, and Abdul Hamid Khan Bhashani became its first president. He wrote a pamphlet on this occasion titled "Main Demands." The pamphlet reads

The East Pakistan Muslim League member's convention believes that, like all the events of every century, of every country, Lahore Resolution has also made history... But even though Pakistan is an Islamic state, it is not a Muslim state, or a state made only for Muslims and nor does be wished to be influenced by Anti-Islamic imperialist, Capitalist nor by self centered government. In the view of Islam, Allah is not for Muslims but He is the God of the entire humanity- irrespective of nation, religion and color. Rabb is Allah's greatest identity. And as Rabb the Rububuiyat or lordship is our first and most important duty.

== Personal life ==
Shamsul Huq was married to Afia Khatun, whose childhood friend Begum Jahanara was the wife of Yar Mohammad Khan who was a founder (treasurer) of the Awami League and the founder (publisher) of The Daily Ittefaq. Afia Khatun lived and worked in the United States later in her life. She authored a book – Bengali Language Movement and the Creation of Bangladesh (2011) – with her husband Anwar S. Dil.
