= Tangail-7 =

Constituency of Bangladesh's Jatiya Sangsad

Coordinates: 24.10°N 90.10°E

- Constituency for the Jatiya Sangsad
- District: Tangail District
- Division: Dhaka Division
- Electorate: 375,437 (2026)

Current constituency
- Created: 1973
- Party: Bangladesh Nationalist Party
- Member: Abul Kalam Azad Siddiqui
- ← 135 Tangail-6 137 Tangail-8 →

Tangail-7 is a constituency represented in the Jatiya Sangsad (National Parliament) of Bangladesh since 2026 by Abul Kalam Azad Siddiqui of the Bangladesh Nationalist Party.

== Boundaries ==
The constituency encompasses Mirzapur Upazila.

== History ==
The constituency was created for the first general elections in newly independent Bangladesh, held in 1973.

== Members of Parliament ==
Election	Member	Party
1973	Shawkat Ali Khan	Awami League
1979	Khaju Mia	Bangladesh Nationalist Party
Major Boundary Changes
1986	Wajid Ali Khan Panni	Jatiya Party
1991	Kh. Badar Uddin	Bangladesh Nationalist Party
Feb 1996	Abul Kalam Azad Siddiqui	Bangladesh Nationalist Party
2001	Md. Akabbar Hossain	Awami League
2022 by-election	Khan Ahmed Shuvo	Awami League
2026	Abul Kalam Azad Siddiqui	Bangladesh Nationalist Party

== Elections ==
=== Elections in the 2020s ===
General Election 2026: Tangail-7
Party	Candidate	Votes	%	±%
BNP	Abul Kalam Azad Siddiqui	141,253	66.1	N/A
Jamaat	Mohammad Abdullah Ebneh Abul Hossain	71,040	33.2	N/A
Bangladesh Republican Party	Md. Tofazzal Hossain	1,492	0.7	N/A
Majority		70,213	32.8	N/A
Turnout		213,785	56.9	N/A
BNP gain from AL				

=== Elections in the 2010s ===
Ekabbar Hossain was re-elected unopposed in the 2014 general election after opposition parties withdrew their candidacies in a boycott of the election.

=== Elections in the 2000s ===
General Election 2008: Tangail-7
Party	Candidate	Votes	%	±%
AL	Md. Akabbar Hossain	130,154	58.4	+10.5
BNP	Abul Kalam Azad Siddiqui	88,916	39.9	−6.9
KSJL	Shafiur Rahman Sunny	3,034	1.4	−2.0
Independent	Dewan Nazrul Islam	679	0.3	N/A
Majority		41,238	18.5	+17.4
Turnout		222,783	86.4	+5.9
AL hold				

General Election 2001: Tangail-7
Party	Candidate	Votes	%	±%
AL	Md. Akabbar Hossain	89,931	47.9	+10.6
BNP	Abul Kalam Azad Siddiqui	87,857	46.8	+5.7
KSJL	Sadek Ahmed Khan	6,457	3.4	N/A
IJOF	Md. Nurul Islam	2,825	1.5	N/A
Bangladesh Progressive Party	Md. Motasim Billah	696	0.4	N/A
Majority		2,074	1.1	−2.7
Turnout		187,766	80.5	+0.9
AL gain from BNP				

=== Elections in the 1990s ===
General Election June 1996: Tangail-7
Party	Candidate	Votes	%	±%
BNP	Abul Kalam Azad Siddiqui	59,848	41.1	−12.0
AL	Md. Akabbar Hossain	54,303	37.3	+2.4
JP(E)	Md. Jahirul Islam Jahir	27,942	19.2	+10.2
Jamaat	Md. Abdul Halim	2,383	1.6	N/A
Communist Kendra	Kh. Nurur Rhaman Salim	349	0.2	N/A
Independent	Kh. Badar Uddin	323	0.2	N/A
IOJ	Syed Mojibor Rahman	271	0.2	−0.6
Independent	Md. Murshed Ali Khan Ponnee	205	0.1	N/A
Majority		5,545	3.8	−14.3
Turnout		145,624	79.6	+21.1
BNP hold				

General Election 1991: Tangail-7
Party	Candidate	Votes	%	±%
BNP	Kh. Badar Uddin	62,882	53.1	
AL	Md. Fazlur Rahman Faruque	41,392	34.9	
JP(E)	Shah Mostanjidul Haq	10,633	9.0	
JSD	Mohidur Rahman	1,773	1.5	
IOJ	Md. Mojibur Rahman	989	0.8	
Independent	Md. Nurul Islam	436	0.4	
CPB	Kh. Nurur Rahman Selim	397	0.3	
Majority		21,490	18.1	
Turnout		118,502	58.5	
BNP gain from JP(E)				
