= Abdul Haque =

Bangladeshi essayist, journalist, and writer

- আবদুল হক
- Born: 1918; Nawabganj, Malda district, Bengal Presidency
- Died: 1997 (aged 78–79); Bangladesh
- Education: Government Saadat College; Rajshahi College; University of Calcutta

Abdul Haque (Bengali: আবদুল হক; 1918–1997) was a Bangladeshi essayist, journalist and writer. He served as a deputy director of the Bangla Academy, a government-funded regulatory institution. He was posthumously awarded an Ekushey Padak in language and literature in 2011.

== Early life and education ==
Haque was born in 1918, to a Bengali Muslim family in the village of Udainagar located in Nawabganj (then under Malda district), part of the British Raj's Bengal Province.

He passed his matriculation with a first from Kansat High School in 1936, and then a first in his Intermediate of Arts from the Government Saadat College in 1939. In 1944, he graduated from Rajshahi College with a Bachelor of Arts in English and in 1946, with a Master of Arts from the University of Calcutta.

== Career ==
Haque joined The Daily Azad in 1945 as its sub-editor, and later worked for the Saogat. He joined the Regional Information Office in Dhaka as a staff writer in 1947. Following the independence of Pakistan, he worked as the assistant publishing officer in the Bengali Development Board. Haque was later promoted to publication officer. In 1964, he was awarded the 'Dawood Prize'. The Bengali Development Board was merged into the Bangla Academy and he was made deputy director of Bangla Academy.

== Award ==
In 1974 he was awarded the Bangla Academy Literary Award. He wrote a number of plays. His essays were published in journals and were published in books. In 1981 he retired from the Bangla Academy as its director. In 1988 he was awarded the Abul Hasnat Literary Award and in 1990 the Hilali Memorial Gold Medal.

== Death ==
Haque died in 1997.
