= Morshed Ali Khan Panni =

Bangladeshi politician

- Constituency: Tangail-8

Member of 2nd Jatiya Sangsad
- In office 1979–1986
- Preceded by: Fazlur Rahman Faruque

Member of 4th Jatiya Sangsad
- In office 1988–1991
- Preceded by: Shawkat Momen Shahjahan
- Succeeded by: Humayun Khan Panni

Personal details
- Party: Bangladesh Nationalist Party
- Parent: Khurram Khan Panni (father)
- Relatives: Wajed Ali Khan Panni (great grandfather), Humayun Khan Panni (uncle), Wajid Ali Khan Panni (brother)

Morshed Ali Khan Panni is a Bangladesh Nationalist Party politician and a former member of parliament from Tangail-8.

== Early life and family ==
Morshed Ali Khan Panni was born into the Bengali Muslim family known as the Zamindars of Karatia. His father, Khurram Khan Panni, was a civil servant and landowner. His ancestors were Pashtuns belonging to the Panni tribe, and had migrated from Afghanistan to Bengal in the 16th century where they became culturally assimilated.

Panni's older brother is Wajid Ali Khan Panni (Bunting), the motawalli or supervisor of the zamindari estate. The two brothers had a dispute after Bunting Panni rented Rokeya Manzil of the estate to Lighthouse School, a school established by Islami Chhatra Shibir in 2000.

== Career ==
Panni was elected to parliament from Tangail-8 as a Bangladesh Nationalist Party candidate in 1979. He was elected to parliament in 1988 from Tangail-8 as a Jatiya Party candidate.
