= Khan Ahmed Shuvo =

Bangladeshi politician

- খান আহমেদ শুভ

Member of the Bangladesh Parliament for Tangail-7
- In office 22 January 2022 – 6 August 2024
- Preceded by: Md. Akabbar Hossain

Personal details
- Born: 15 July 1975 (age 50)
- Party: Awami League
- Parent: Fazlur Rahman Faruque (father)

Khan Ahmed Shuvo (born 15 July 1975) is a Bangladesh Awami League politician and a former Jatiya Sangsad member representing the Tangail-7 constituency. He has won the by-elections in Tangail (Mirzapur) constituency that were held on 16 January 2022.

== Career ==
Shuvo was elected to parliament from Tangail-7 as an Awami League candidate. Shuvo received 104,059 votes while his closest rival, Jatiya Party candidate Jahirul Islam Jahir, received 16,773 votes. On 22 January 2022, he took his oath as a member of parliament at the Jatiya Sangsad Bhaban which was administered by Speaker Shirin Sharmin Chaudhury.

Shuvo is the director of Federation of Bangladesh Chambers of Commerce & Industries. Shuvo is an executive editor of local newspaper Daily Ajker Deshbashi published from Tangail. He is executive member of Tangail District Awami League.

== Personal life ==
Shuvo's father Fazlur Rahman Faruque is the veteran politician who is the current president of the Tangail District unit of the Awami League and incumbent district council administrator.
