= Md. Akabbar Hossain =

Bangladeshi politician (1956–2021)

- একাব্বর হোসেন

Member of Parliament for Tangail-7
- In office 1 October 2001 – 16 November 2021
- Preceded by: Abul Kalam Azad Siddiqui
- Succeeded by: Khan Ahmed Shuvo

Personal details
- Born: 12 July 1956 Mirzapur, Tangail, East Pakistan, Pakistan
- Died: 16 November 2021 (aged 65) Dhaka, Bangladesh
- Party: Bangladesh Awami League
- Education: University of Dhaka

Md. Akabbar Hossain (12 July 1956 – 16 November 2021) was a Bangladesh Awami League politician. He was elected to parliament from the Tangail-7 seat for four consecutive terms.

== Early life ==
Hossain was born on 12 July 1956. He has a master's degree from the University of Dhaka.

== Career ==
Hossain was elected to parliament for the first time from Tangail-7 on 2001 as a Bangladesh Awami League candidate. He was the chairman of the Parliamentary Standing Committee for Ministry of Road, Transport and Bridges.

== Death ==
Hossain died at Combined Military Hospital, Dhaka on 16 November 2021, at the age of 65.
