= The Musalman =

Urdu-language newspaper in South India

- Type: Daily newspaper
- Format: Broadsheet
- Owner: Syed Nasarulla
- Founded: 1927
- Language: Urdu
- Headquarters: Chennai, India
- Circulation: 22,000

The Musalman (مسلمان (musalmān)) is an Urdu-language daily newspaper published from Chennai, India. It is regarded as one of the oldest Urdu newspapers in South India and is notable for being handwritten by calligraphers before printing.

It is an evening newspaper with four pages, all of which are handwritten by katibs (calligraphers) before being reproduced using a printing press. According to Wired and The Times of India, it is possibly the only surviving handwritten newspaper in the world.

== History ==
The newspaper was founded by Syed Azmathullah in 1927. It was inaugurated by Dr. Mukhtar Ahmed Ansari, then president of the Madras session of the Indian National Congress.

The newspaper's office is located on Triplicane High Road in Chennai.

After the founder's death, the newspaper was edited by his son Syed Fazlullah, who died on 26 April 2008 at the age of 78. In 2007, Fazlullah expressed concern that the calligraphy tradition might decline as younger generations showed less interest.

As of April 2018, Syed Arifullah serves as the chief editor.

== Production ==
The calligraphers, known as katibs, work in a small office space of about 800 square feet. The handwritten pages are later converted into photo negatives and printed using a printing press.

As of 2008, the team consisted of one male and two female calligraphers, each spending several hours preparing the pages. Rahman Husseini serves as the chief katib, having taken over the role in 1980.

The newspaper also employs reporters and correspondents across cities such as New Delhi, Kolkata, and Hyderabad.

== Format ==
The newspaper consists of four pages. The front page covers national and international news, the middle pages focus on local news, and the final page is dedicated to sports.

As of 2018, the newspaper is sold at 75 paise per copy and has around 21,000 subscribers.
