= Shaukat Ali Khan =

Awami League politician (1926-2006)

- শওকত আলী খান

Jatiya Sangsad member from Tangail-7
- In office 1973–1975

Personal details
- Born: 9 February 1926 Tangail, Bengal Presidency, British India
- Died: 1 July 2006 (aged 80) Mirzapur, Tangail, Bangladesh
- Party: Awami League
- Relatives: Ranadaprasad Saha (father-in-law)
- Education: Scottish Church College

Shaukat Ali Khan (9 February 1926 – 1 July 2006) was an Awami League politician in Pakistan, and later in Bangladesh. He was elected as the Member of Parliament (MP) from Mirzapur in 1970 and as the Jatiya Sangsad member from the Tangail-7 constituency from 1973 to 1975. He was awarded Independence Day Award by the Government of Bangladesh in 2019 posthumously.

Khan passed his matriculation from Rangoon University. He passed his I.Sc. from St. Xavier's College, Kolkata and bachelor's degree from Scottish Church College, Kolkata. He later earned his bar-at-law from Lincoln's Inn in London.
