= Akhbare Islamia =

Defunct Bengali-language magazine

Akhbare Islamia আখবারে এসলামীয়া
- Editor: Naimuddin
- Founder: Mahmud Ali Khan Panni
- First issue: April 1884
- Country: Bengal Presidency
- Based in: Tangail, Bengal Presidency, British Raj
- Language: Bengali

Akhbare Islamia (Bengali: আখবারে এসলামীয়া, lit. 'Islamic newspaper') was a late 19th-century Bengali-language magazine. It was published monthly and funded by the Zamindars of Karatia in Tangail, in present-day Bangladesh. The magazine mainly discussed subjects relating to the Sharia (Islamic law), Islamic theology, biographies of Muslims, and Islamic culture as well as contemporary social and religious issues.

== History ==
The Akhbare Islamia was founded in April 1884 by Hafez Mahmud Ali Khan Panni, the erstwhile zamindar (feudal lord) of Karatia. The magazine was edited by Mohammad Naimuddin, a Muslim theologian and poet. It was published until 1894 and restarted publication in April 1896 with a different format. However, it was permanently disbanded not long after.

== Content ==
The magazine was part of an Islamic morality in Bengal that promoted Islam that was common among Bengali Muslims. The movement was fundamentalist in nature that discouraged secular books and music. It had legal disputes with its contemporary, The Ahmadi, a secular Muslim magazine, regarding the killing of cows and Hanafi-Lamazhabi dialogue.
