= Kh. Badar Uddin =

Bangladeshi politician

Member of Bangladesh Parliament
- In office 1991–1996
- Preceded by: Wajid Ali Khan Panni
- Succeeded by: Abul Kalam Azad Siddiqui

Personal details
- Party: Bangladesh Nationalist Party

Kh. Badar Uddin is a Bangladesh Nationalist Party politician and a former member of parliament for Tangail-7.

== Career ==
Uddin was elected to parliament from Tangail-7 as a Bangladesh Nationalist Party candidate in 1991.
