= Abdul Hamid Khan Bhashani =

Bangladeshi revolutionary and politician (1880–1976)

Maulana Abdul Hamid Khan Bhashani
- আবদুল হামিদ খান ভাসানী
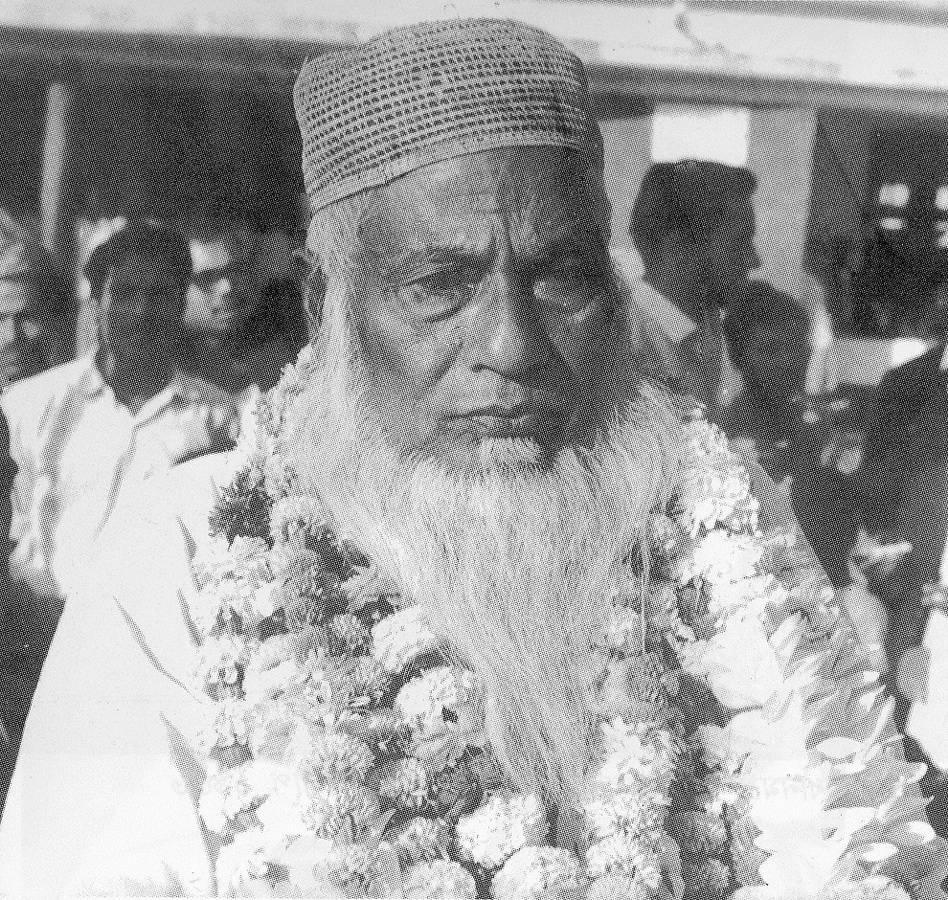
- Abdul Hamid Khan Bhashani 1965
- Born: 12 December 1880; Sirajganj subdistrict, Bengal, British India
- Died: 17 November 1976 (aged 95); Dhaka, Bangladesh
- Resting place: Santosh, Tangail, Bangladesh
- Other names: Mozlum Jananeta, Maulana Bhashani
- Education: Darul Uloom Deoband

1st President of Awami League
- In office 1949–1956
- General Secretary: Shamsul Huq; Sheikh Mujibur Rahman
- Preceded by: Office established
- Succeeded by: Huseyn Shaheed Suhrawardy

Member of Parliament of Pakistan
- In office 1954–1955

Member of the Assam Legislative Assembly for Dhubri (South)
- In office 1936–1946
- Succeeded by: M. M. Abul Kasem

Personal details
- Party: Indian National Congress (1917–1923); Swaraj Party (1923–1930); All-India Muslim League (1930–1949); Muslim League (1947–1949); Awami League (1949–1957); National Awami Party (1957–1967)
- Awards: Independence Award; Ekushey Padak

Religious life
- Religion: Islam
- Denomination: Sunni
- Jurisprudence: Hanafi
- Movement: Deobandi

Muslim leader
- Teacher: Abdul Bari Chishti; Hussain Ahmad Madani
- Disciple of: Sayyid Nasir al-Din al-Baghdadi
- Influenced by: Mahmud Hasan Deobandi
- Arabic name
- Personal (Ism): ʿAbd al-Ḥamīd عبد الحميد
- Patronymic (Nasab): ibn Sharāfat ibn Karāmat ʿAlī Khān إبن شرافة بن كرامة علي خان
- Epithet (Laqab): Maẓlūm Jananetā مظلوم جننيتا
- Toponymic (Nisba): al-Bāshānī الباشاني

Abdul Hamid Khan Bhashani (Note: Bengali: আবদুল হামিদ খান ভাসানী; Bengali pronunciation: [ˈabd̪ul ˈɦamid̪ 'kʰaˑn 'bʱaʃani]) (12 December 1880 – 17 November 1976), also known reverentially as Maulana Bhashani, was a Bangladeshi politician and statesman who was one of the founders of the Awami League. His political tenure spanned the British India, Pakistan, and Bangladesh periods. Bhashani was popularly known by the honorary title Mozlum Jananeta (Note: meaning: leader of the oppressed) for his lifelong stance advocating for the poor.

He gained nationwide mass popularity among the peasants and helped to build the East Pakistan Peasant Association. Owing to his political leaning to the left, often dubbed Islamic Socialism, he was also called 'The Red Maulana'. He is considered one of the main pillars of Bangladeshi independence (1971).

An alumnus of Darul Uloom Deoband and participant in the Khilafat Movement protesting the dissolution of the Ottoman Empire, he led the Muslims of Assam in a successful campaign during the 1947 Sylhet Referendum, through which Sylhet chose to become part of the Pakistan national project. He was the founder and president of the Pakistan Awami Muslim League (AML), which later became the Awami League (AL). Later, however, owing to differences with the right-leaning leaders in the AML, such as Huseyn Shaheed Suhrawardy, on the issue of autonomy for East Pakistan, he formed a new progressive party called the National Awami Party (NAP). Bhashani also differed with Suhrawardy when the latter, as Prime Minister of Pakistan, decided to join the US-led defence pacts CENTO and SEATO. He disagreed with Pakistan's growing ties with the United States.

The split of the left-wing camp into pro-Moscow and pro-Beijing factions eventually led to the break-up of NAP into two separate parties, the pro-Moscow faction being led by Muzaffar Ahmed. After Pakistan's 1965 war with India, he showed some support for Field Marshal Ayub Khan's regime for its China-leaning foreign policy, but later he provided leadership to a mass uprising against the regime in 1968–69.

American journalist Dan Coggin, writing for Time, credited Bhashani, "as much as any one man", for instigating the 1969 mass uprising in East Pakistan that culminated in the collapse of the Ayub Khan regime and the release of Sheikh Mujibur Rahman and the others accused in the Agartala conspiracy case. According to lay author S. Akhtar Ehtisham, Bhashani's decision to boycott the 1970 Pakistan general elections effectively led to the electoral landslide by his erstwhile opponent, Mujibur Rahman. The Awami League, without any viable opposition in East Pakistan, won 160 of the 162 seats in the province and thus gained a majority in the Pakistan National Assembly.

== Early life and education ==
Bhashani was born Mohammad Abdul Hamid Khan at Dhangara, a village in the Sirajganj mahakuma (lit. 'a subdistrict') of the Pabna district in Bengal, British India (present-day Sirajganj District in Bangladesh), to Hajji Mohammad Sharafat Khan and Mazirannesa Bibi in a Bengali Muslim family. As Bhashani's early biographic details are not well recorded, his birth year is disputed between 1880 and 1885. According to his most prominent biographer, Syed Abul Maksud, 1885 is the best estimate. Bhashani, nicknamed Chega Miah, was the second child of his parents; he had one elder brother, called Amir Ali Khan; one younger brother, called Ismail Khan; and a sister, called Kulsum Khanam.

Bhashani's father, Sharafat Khan, used to be a village grocer as well as a farmer. He was relatively better off than ordinary peasants. His surname, Khan, and title, hajji, bestowed upon Muslims who had performed the Hajj pilgrimage, suggest that he garnered considerable respect in his community; he died young, aged around 36 or 37. Bhashani, still a child aged about 8 to 10, lost the remainder of his family, including his grandmother, in the Sirajganj cholera epidemic of 1894–1895. As Bhashani lost his father while his grandfather was alive, he was not eligible to inherit his father's properties as per Muslim custom. His uncle, Ibrahim Khan, took custody.

In Bengal, British India, land used to be owned by zamindars (lit. 'landowners') appointed by the British government by the Permanent Settlement. Most of the zamindars were oppressive, exacting unfair amounts of and unlawful taxes from the poor peasants. There were also village mahajans (lit. ' usurers'), to whom farmers often resorted for loans. Unbridled by law, mahajans used to exact high interests and commit forgeries. Exploitation often led to farmer revolts. A few years before Bhashani's birth, between 1872 and 1873, his native Pabna district had seen a historic peasant revolt. He experienced famines during his childhood and saw many of his close friends succumb to famine. Bhashani's milieu consisted of poor sharecropper peasants.

Bhashani received his early education at his village paathshala, a traditional primary school. He was also a student of Mawlana Abdul Bari Chishti at his madrasa (est. c. 1887) in Sirajganj. An orphaned Bhashani caught the attention of Syed Nasir ud-din Baghdadi, an Assam-based pir (lit. 'Sufi preacher') who was on a sojourn in Sirajganj. Baghdadi took Bhashani with him as a talib-e-ilm (lit. 'disciple') when he returned to his base in Jaleswar, a locality on the Brahmaputra in the Goalpara district of Assam, in 1904. The Goalpara and Dhubri regions, both situated on the braided river Brahmaputra, would later be the scene of Bhashani's youthful political activism, constituting an interface between the Bengal and Assam provinces with a Bangla-speaking Muslim majority population. The region was mostly forests, freshly cultivated by migrant peasants from Bengal. In Jaleswar, Baghdadi gave Bhashani lessons in Arabic, Urdu, the Quran, Hadith, and Fiqh. Baghdadi sent Bhashani to Maulana Mahmud Hasan in Darul Uloom Deoband, an Islamic seminary in northern India, for higher studies in Islamic theology.

Bhashani spent two years, from 1907 to 1909, in Deoband. He studied the Quran and Hadith under Maulana Hussain Ahmad Madani. Dar-ul-Uloom Deoband, one of the two Muslim education trends in British India, founded by anti-British Muslim clerics, at that time was a hotbed of anti-British ideals. The other trend, based in Aligarh, used to be pro-British rule. Bhashani travelled around northern India. Impatient by nature, Bhashani's interest in politics and the human condition overrode theology.

== Political career ==
=== Early political activities ===
After returning from Deoband in 1909, Bhashani took work as a school teacher at a primary school at Kagmaree in Tangail, a place across the river Jamuna from Sirajganj. Rich with experience from his travels in Northern India and Assam, he became more politically conscious. Influenced by a youth from Brahmanbaria, whom he met during his visit to Kolkata shortly after his return from Deoband, Bhashani briefly joined one of the extremist anti-British organizations in Bengal. Having learned to use a gun, he took part in some raids against some oppressive zamindars. After spending a couple of years in Kagmaree, Hamid moved to Panchbibi in Bogura district (now Joypurhat District) in around 1911.

Till then, Bhashani had been working more like an independent activist without any political affiliation. By 1913, he had cut ties with the extremist political line. His first meeting with Chittaranjan Das, a prominent Indian National Congress leader, in October 1917 in Mymensingh inspired him to join direct politics. After performing his hajj the next year, he became a primary member of the Congress in 1919 and fully devoted himself to politics. Imprisoned in the same year, he met many famous politicians in prison.

He participated in the Khilafat Movement like many Muslim youths. Influence of the Ali brothers: Muhammad Ali and Shaukat Ali. Joined the Swaraj Party of Chittaranjan Das (1922).

During this period, Bhashani's vocal pro-peasant stance brought him into conflict with several zamindars in the Rajshahi-Tangail region, notably against the zamindar of Dhopghat in Rajshahi (known as the Astan Mollah revolt) and the zamindar of Santosh in Tangail. These conflicts kept him under constant move. The zamindar of Santosh had him ousted from Mymensingh district. In late 1926, the government of Bengal declared him persona non grata. As a result, he left for Assam in 1926 and settled in Ghagmaree, later renamed Hamidabad in his honour, near Jaleswar.

=== Assam ===
The British defeated the Burmese dynasty that ruled Assam in the First Anglo-Burmese War in 1826. As compensation for the war, Assam came under British rule, about seventy years after Bengal did. The British rulers adopted a different and more favorable land system for Assam, attracting peasants from Bengal seeking escape from their oppressive zamindars. The migrant peasants occupied the previously uninhabited regions and cultivated land, clearing forests. By the time Bhashani arrived in Assam, migrant peasants were experiencing deprivation and persecution by the native Assamese. The so-called line system forbade migrants from acquiring land outside a fixed boundary. Bhasani had been vocal about the rights of Bengali migrant peasants even before settling in Assam in 1926. Already popular among them, he organized a migrant farmers convention in 1924 at Bhasan Char, a braid bar on the river Brahmaputra, in Dhubri district. At the convention, he demanded the abolition of the line system. The convention earned him the nisba (lit. toponym) Bhasani that he would carry for the rest of his life. He also started gaining pir status at the same time.

Bhasani would organize several farmer and peasant conventions in the coming years. In December 1932, he organized a mammoth peasant convention in Sirajganj. Held on Kauakhola Maidan, a freshly harvested paddy field beside the river Jamuna, the 3-day-long event attracted about 350,000 peasants. Inaugurated by Shaheed Suhrawardy, a Kolkata-based Muslim League leader, the convention brought Bhasani nationwide fame. The convention also alarmed the British government about his rise.

Left Congress and joined the Muslim League in 1937. He got elected from the South Dhubri constituency as a Muslim League candidate in the 1937 election. He made a speech in Bangla in the Assam assembly for the first time, breaking the tradition. The Assam provincial assembly was a patchwork of several provincial parties with no clear majority. In the next few years, house leadership passed between the Congress-led coalition, headed by Bordoloi, and the Muslim League-led one, headed by Sadullah, several times. Bhasani was disillusioned by both of them.

In April 1944, he was elected president of the Assam Muslim League at its Barpeta session and thereafter devoted himself to the Pakistan Movement. He worked as an activist in the Sylhet referendum that would decide whether Sylhet district belonged to India or Pakistan after partition. He was instrumental in bringing Sylhet into Pakistan. He advocated for similar referendums in other Muslim-majority districts of Assam. Both the Indian and Pakistani leaders were at odds with Bhasani. Released from imprisonment, he was ousted from Assam by the Assam provincial government in 1948 with his family still in Assam. Retained a life-long bond with Assam.

=== Activities during Pakistan days ===
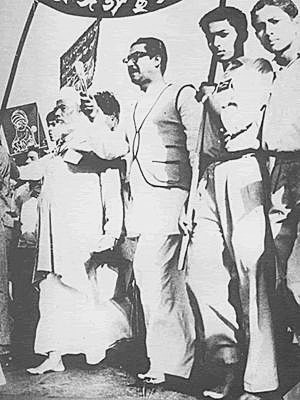
Maulana Abdul Hamid Khan Bhashani with Bangabandhu Sheikh Mujibur Rahman, marching barefoot to pay tribute at Shaheed Minar (Martyrs' monument) in Dhaka on 21 February 1954.

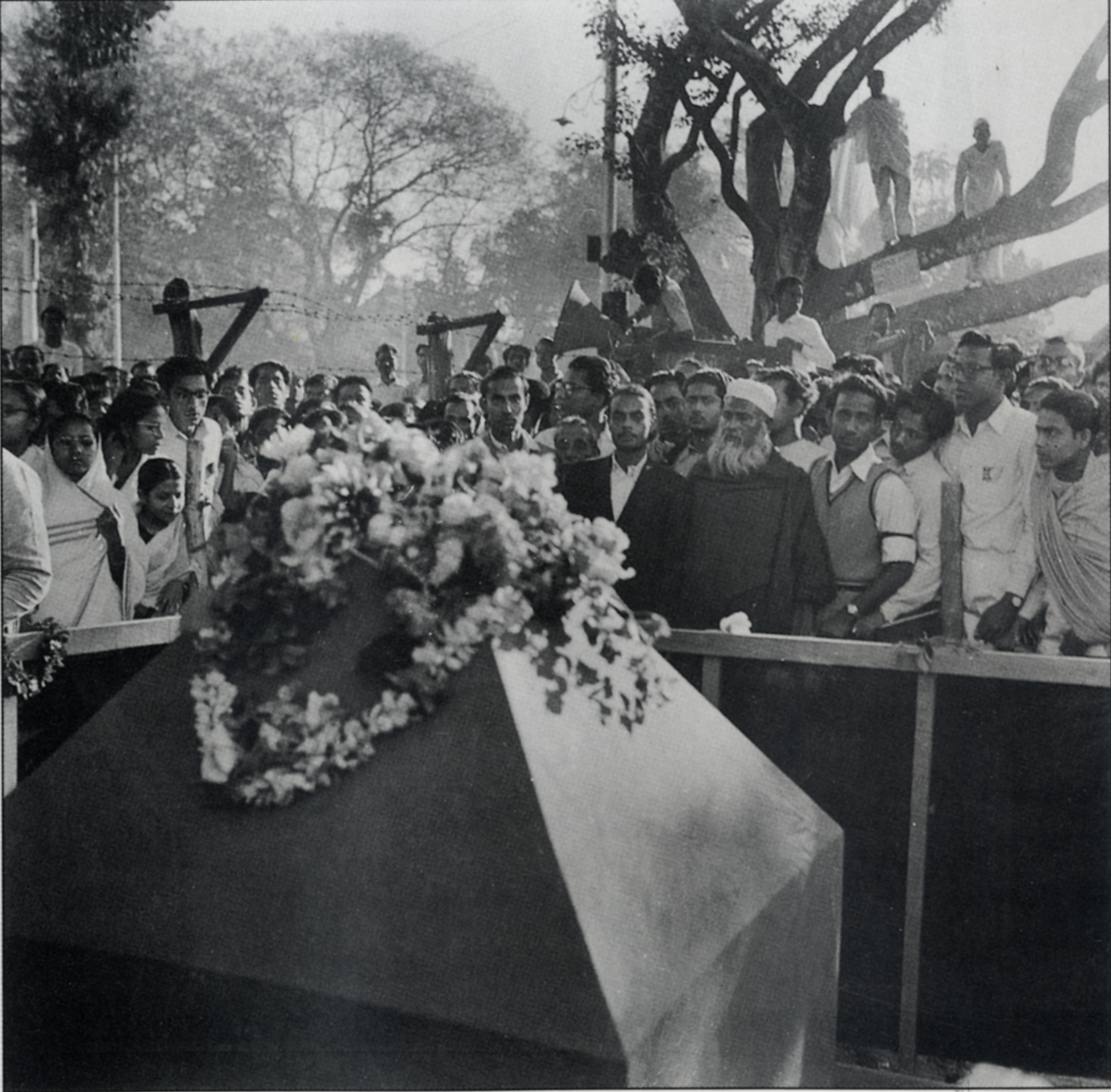
Maulana Bhashani after the foundation stone=laying program for Shaheed Minar on 21 February 1956.

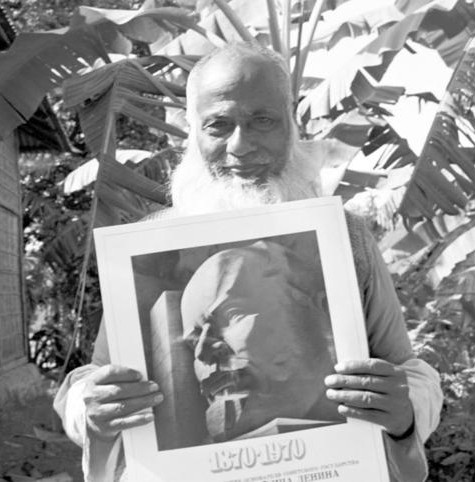
Maulana Bhashani in 1970 holding a portrait of Vladimir Lenin

After the establishment of India and Pakistan in 1947, following the exit of the British, Bhashani planned his anti-establishment course of action. On 23 June 1949, he founded the East Pakistan Awami Muslim League. Bhasani was elected its president, with Shamsul Huq as its general secretary. On 24 July 1949, he organised the first meeting of the Awami Muslim League at Armanitola, Dhaka, during which Yar Mohammad Khan contributed and finally established the party in Dhaka.

On 31 January 1952, he formed the "All Party Language Movement Committee" at the Dhaka Bar Library to support the Bengali language movement. He campaigned for the recognition of Bangla as a national language in Pakistan. The National Democratic Front was established under his leadership on 4 December 1953. He renamed the Awami Muslim League as the Awami League by removing "Muslim" from its official name in the council session of the Awami League held on 21–23 October 1955.

The Muslim League government, both in the centre and in the province of East Pakistan, lost considerable popularity after the Language Movement of 1952. It was seen as not being capable or interested in protecting the interests of East Pakistan. With an election to be held in the province in 1954, a new political alliance emerged to challenge the Muslim League. It was called the United Front and comprised the party led by Bhashani and the Krishak Sramik Party led by A. K. Fazlul Huq, former Prime Minister of Bengal. The Awami League, under Huseyn Shaheed Suhrawardy, also joined the alliance. The United Front won the provincial election in East Pakistan by defeating the Muslim League.

In May 1954, Bhashani went to Stockholm. He was barred from returning to East Bengal by the government of Iskander Mirza and branded a communist. Between 7 and 23 May 1956, Bhashani went on a hunger strike to demand food for famine-affected people.

During the Kagmaree Conference of the Awami League, held on 7–8 February 1957, Bhashani left the West Pakistani authority, which had acted negatively against East Pakistan. On 24–25 July 1957, Bhashani convened the conference of All-Pakistan Democratic Activists. On 25 July, he formed the National Awami Party. Bhashani was elected the president with Mahmudul Huq Osmani as general secretary.

According to Ehtisham, Bhashani played a crucial role in the opposition's decision to nominate Fatima Jinnah as a candidate in the 1965 Pakistani presidential election instead of Azam Khan. Fatima Jinnah was initially scornful of an opposition attempt to nominate her; however, on Bhashani's personal intervention, she agreed to be their joint candidate.

Despite this pledged support for Fatima Jinnah, Bhashani was controversially alleged to have become inactive during the opposition's presidential campaign, ostensibly because of Ayub Khan's pro-China leanings; Sherbaz Khan Mazari later alleged that Bhashani was bribed by Zulfikar Ali Bhutto.

In 1969 Bhashani launched a movement for the withdrawal of the Agartala Conspiracy Case and the release of Sheikh Mujib. American journalist Dan Coggin, writing for Time, credited Bhashani, "as much as any one man", for instigating the 1969 mass uprising in East Pakistan that culminated in the collapse of the Ayub Khan regime. In 1970 Bhashani called for the independence of East Pakistan consistent with the 1940 Lahore Resolution.

Bhashani, with his National Awami Party, had organised an International Kisan conference from 23 to 25 March 1970 in Toba Tek Singh District. During the conference, he asked the Government of Pakistan to hold a referendum asking the population if they wanted Islamic socialism. He warned that there might be guerrilla warfare if the military government failed to do so.

After the Pakistan government's poor response to the 1970 Bhola Cyclone, which left over 500,000 people dead, an enraged Abdul Hamid Khan Bhashani, who had previously led multiple rebellions against the British Raj, was the first ever Bengali to declare the independence of East Pakistan in a massive public rally on 23 November 1970, but it was not officially recognized.

== War of Independence, 1971 ==
During the March 1971 crackdown, aged about 86, Bhashani was staying at his home in Santosh, Tangail. Following the crackdown, he left his home and crossed Jamuna for Sirajganj, and he met rival NAP (Mozaffar) faction workers Saiful Islam and Moraduzzaman in Sirajganj. Shortly after his departure, his house in Santosh was burnt by the Pakistani occupation army. Unaware of the Mujibnagar government, he planned to reach London and set up a provisional government himself. Accompanied by the two, he started upstream on the river Jamuna from Sirajganj by boat and headed for Assam, following his familiar river route.

Both Bhasani's past ties with Assam and his pro-Chinese affiliation caused anxiety among the Indian authorities. He was made the chairman of Sorbodoliyo Songram Parisad. Bhashani asked China to aid Bangladesh in its liberation war. His request was not answered by China. He was also the chairman of the Advisory Council of the Mujibnagar Government during the 1971 Liberation War.

== Career in independent Bangladesh ==
Following independence, Bhashani wanted to play the role of a responsible opposition. The progressive forces quickly gathered around him and strengthened the National Awami Party with Kazi Zafar Ahmed as its general secretary. But soon factional differences among the progressive forces emerged and weakened Bhashani's position.

Bhashani was highly critical of the authoritarian style of the Awami League and BAKSAL government. He also warned Sheikh Mujibur Rahman against the ever-rising corruption and political chaos in his own government happening unbeknownst to him. Bhashani was deeply shocked at the killing of Mujib, for whom he had a lot of fatherly affection, and his family members. The person who conveyed the news of Mujib's demise described how Bhashani cried and then went to his prayer room to offer prayer.

In May 1976, he led a massive long march demanding the demolition of the Farakka Barrage, constructed by India to divert the flow of the Ganges waters inside its territory, triggering the drying up of the river Padma and desertification in Bangladesh.

At the time, the government of Bangladesh unofficially supported Bhashani's Farakka Long March. Navy Chief Rear Admiral M. H. Khan was in charge of providing logistics. Hundreds of thousands of people from all walks of life from all over the country gathered in Rajshahi to participate in the Long March.

On the morning of 16 March 1976, Bhashani addressed a gathering of people at the Madrash Maidan in Rajshahi, from where the Long March commenced. Hundreds of thousands of people walked more than 100 kilometres on foot for days. The march continued to Kansat, a place near the India-Bangladesh border, close to the Farakka Barrage.

Bhashani's Farakka Long March was the first popular movement against India by Bangladeshi people who demanded a rightful distribution of the Ganges' water. Since then, the Farakka Long March Day has been observed on 16 May every year in Bangladesh.

== Political philosophy ==
In the early 1950s, he felt that an integrated Pakistan was no longer maintainable due to the hegemony of West Pakistan. At the Kagmari Conference, he bade farewell to West Pakistan by saying As-salamu alaykum which soon became a reference quote. He declined to participate in the national election of 1970, saying that it would only help perpetuate rule by West Pakistan. From 1969 his favourite slogans were Swadhin Bangla Zindabad and Azad Bangla Zindabad. His dream of an independent Bengal came true when Bangladesh was established as an independent nation-state in 1971. He advocated for the separation of state and religion. He was a pious Muslim who was in favour of socialism. He spoke out against Bangladesh Jamaat-e-Islami and its politics.

== Journalism ==
The Daily Ittefaq has been the most popular Bengali newspaper in Bangladesh since the early 1970s. However, its precursor was the Weekly Ittefaq. After the British left South Asia in 1947, the Muslim League emerged as the governing political party. Soon opposition movements started, and a political party named Awami Muslim League was founded with Bhashani as one of the central figures. Against this backdrop, Bhashani and Yar Mohammad Khan started publishing the Weekly Ittefaq in 1949. The popular weekly publication was a critique of the Muslim League government. The journalist Tofazzal Hossain Manik Miah worked as its editor. Manik Miah took over the paper as its editor and publisher on 14 August 1951.

On 25 February 1972, Bhashani started publishing a weekly, Haq Katha, and it soon achieved wide circulation. It was outspoken about the irregularities and misrule of the Awami League government established after the independence of Bangladesh. It was a pro-Chinese and socialist weekly. It was edited by Irfanul Bari, Bhashani's subordinate. The weekly was subsequently banned by Sheikh Mujib.

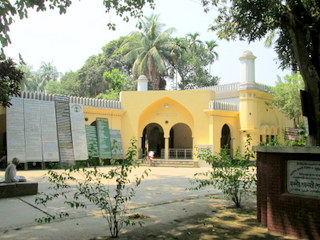
Mazar (mausoleum) of Bhashani and his wife.

== Personal life ==
Bhashani had three wives. During his stay at Panchbibi in around 1911, a young and energetic Hamid caught the attention of the local zamindar, Shamsuddin Chowdhury (aka Shakiruddin Chowdhury). Chowdhury appointed Hamid as a trusted assistant. Later, in late 1925, before moving to Assam, Hamid married Chowdhury's daughter, Alema Khatun. Khatun remained his principal wife. Khatun inherited her father's estates and donated them entirely to Bhashani's Haqqul Ebad Mission. They had two daughters and two sons. His third wife, Hamida Khanom (1918–1964), was the daughter of Qasimuddin Sarkar, the Zamindar of Kanchanpur affiliated with the peasant's movement in Bogra. They had one son and two daughters together.

== Death ==
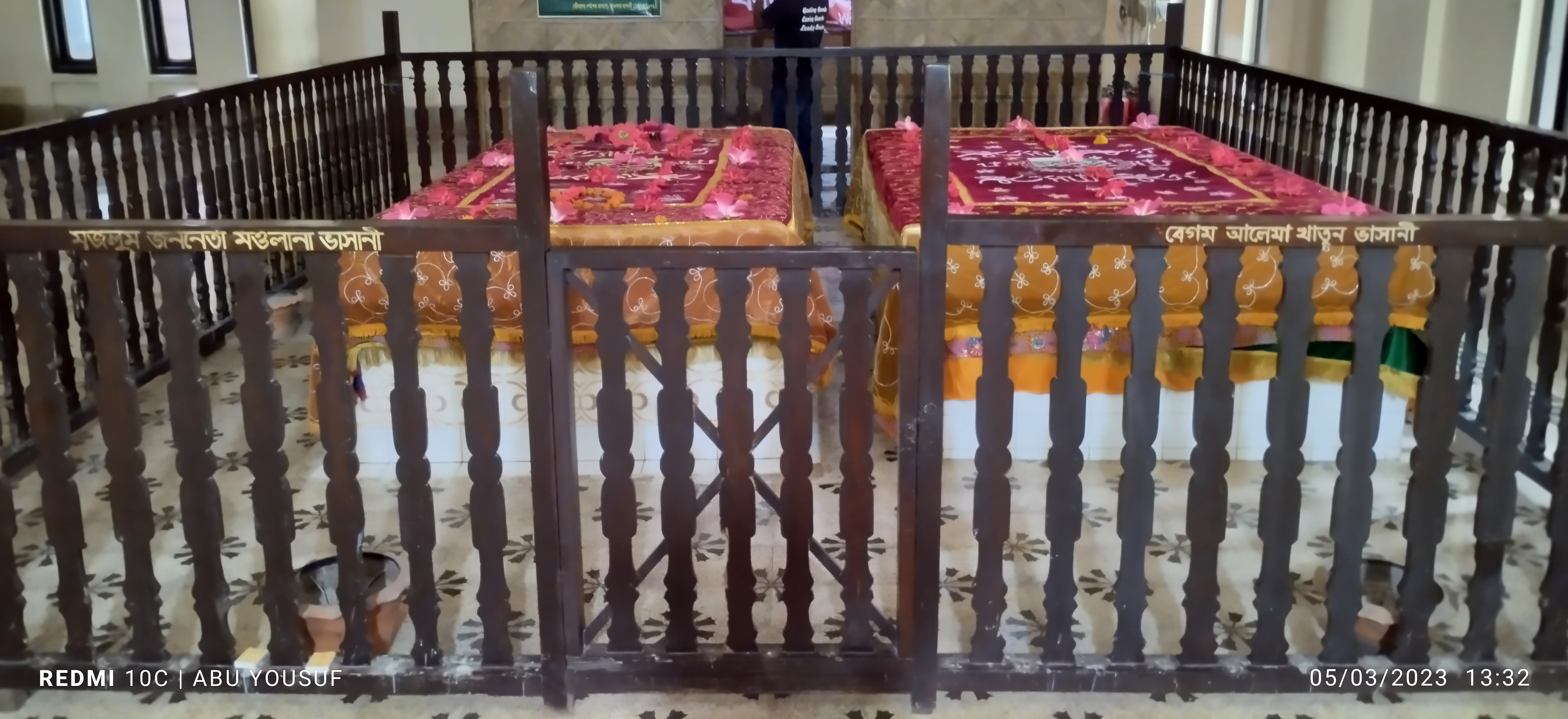
The shrine of Abdul Hamid Khan Bhasani and his wife Alema Khatun in Santosh, Dhaka.

Bhashani died on 17 November 1976 in Dhaka, Bangladesh, aged 96, and was buried at Santosh, Tangail.

== Legacy ==
Bhashani is regarded as the proponent of anti-imperialist, non-communal, and left-leaning politics by his admirers in present-day Bangladesh and beyond. In 2013, the Awami League Government of Bangladesh reduced his presence in school curricula. In 2004, Bhashani was ranked number 8 in the BBC's poll of the Greatest Bengali of all time.

== Sources ==
- Islam, Saiful (1998) [First published February 1987]. স্বাধীনতা ভাসানী ভারত [Independence Bhasani India] (in Bengali) (3rd ed.). Dhaka: বর্তমান সময়.
- Maksud, Syed Abul (2014) [First published May 1994]. মওলানা আব্দুল হামিদ খান ভাসানী [Maulana Abdul Hamid Khan Bhasani] (in Bengali) (2nd ed.). Dhaka: Agamee Prakashani. ISBN 978-984-0416-41-7.
