= Jaleswar, Assam =

Jaleswar
- Town
- Location within Assam Location within India
- Coordinates: 26.047160°N 90.201023°E
- Country: India
- State: Assam
- District: Goalpara

Government

Languages
  - Official: Assamese، English
  - Major languages: Bangla
- Time zone: UTC+5:30 (IST)
- PIN: 783132
- Telephone code: (0091) 03663
- Vehicle registration: AS 18

Jaleswar is a town in the north east state of Assam, India.

Jaleswar, Assam (Vidhan Sabha constituency) is one of the 126 assembly constituencies of Assam Legislative Assembly in India. Sahab uddin Ahmed from All India United Democratic Front is the current legislator from Jaleswar constituency. Jaleswar is also part of Dhubri Lok Sabha constituency.

== Demographics ==
=== Religion ===
Religions in Lakhipur town (2011)
1. Islam (94.4%)
2. Hinduism (5.46%)
3. others (0.10%)

=== Languages ===
Assamese and English Language is used for and official purpose.

Languages of Lakhipur town (2011)
1. Bengali (98.4%)
2. Assamese (1.40%)
