= Karatia Union =

Karatia করটিয়া
- Town
- Location within Bangladesh
- Coordinates: 24°13′27.0732″N 89°58′27.6456″E
- Country: Bangladesh
- Division: Dhaka Division
- District: Tangail District
- Upazila: Tangail Sadar Upazila
- Incorporated: 1984

Government
  - Type: Union Council
  - Chairman: Morshed Ali Khan Panni

Area
  - Total: 19 km^{2} (7.3 sq mi)
- Elevation: 14 m (46 ft)

Population (2017)
  - Total: 70,000
  - Density: 3,700/km^{2} (9,500/sq mi)
- Time zone: UTC+6 (BST)
- Postal code: 1903
- Area code: 0921
- Website: karotiaup.tangail.gov.bd

Karatia Union (Bengali: করটিয়া ইউনিয়ন) is a union of Tangail Sadar Upazila, Bangladesh. It is a suburb of Tangail. The town is situated 6.5 kilometres (4.0 mi) away from Tangail city, 92 kilometres (57 mi) northwest of Dhaka city, the capital. It is the headquarters of the Karatia Zamindari family.

== History ==
Union Parishads in Tangail Sadar Upazila
U:union parishads, M: mahalla or neighbourhood
Owing to space constraints in the small map, the actual locations in a larger map may vary slightly

It is known from the Bengali book ‘Atiyar Chand’ that the Afghan ruler Sulaiman Khan Karrani’s son Bayazid Khan Karrani had come to India and Bayazid’s son Sayeed Khan Panni settled down at Karatiya and constructed the famous Atia Mosque in 1608. Sadat Ali Khan Panni, belonging to the eleventh generation of the family, laid the foundation of the Karatia Zamindari. Wajed Ali Khan Panni (1871-1936), popular as Chand Mia or Atia’s Chand, belonging to the thirteenth generation of the family was a philanthropist and was active in politics. He was imprisoned ln 1929 for his role in the Khilafat Movement. He founded Saadat College in 1926, named after his grandfather Saadat Ali Khan Panni.

== Demographics ==
According to the 2011 Bangladesh census, Karatia Union had 10,260 households and a population of 46,489. The literacy rate (age 7 and over) was 58.9% (male: 62.5%, female: 55.1%).

== Education ==
Government Saadat College is located in this town. Every day almost 10,000 students come in Karatia to take lessons from different parts of Tangail and other nearby villages.

== See also ==
- Elenga
- Karatia Zamindari
- Berabuchina

== Pictures ==
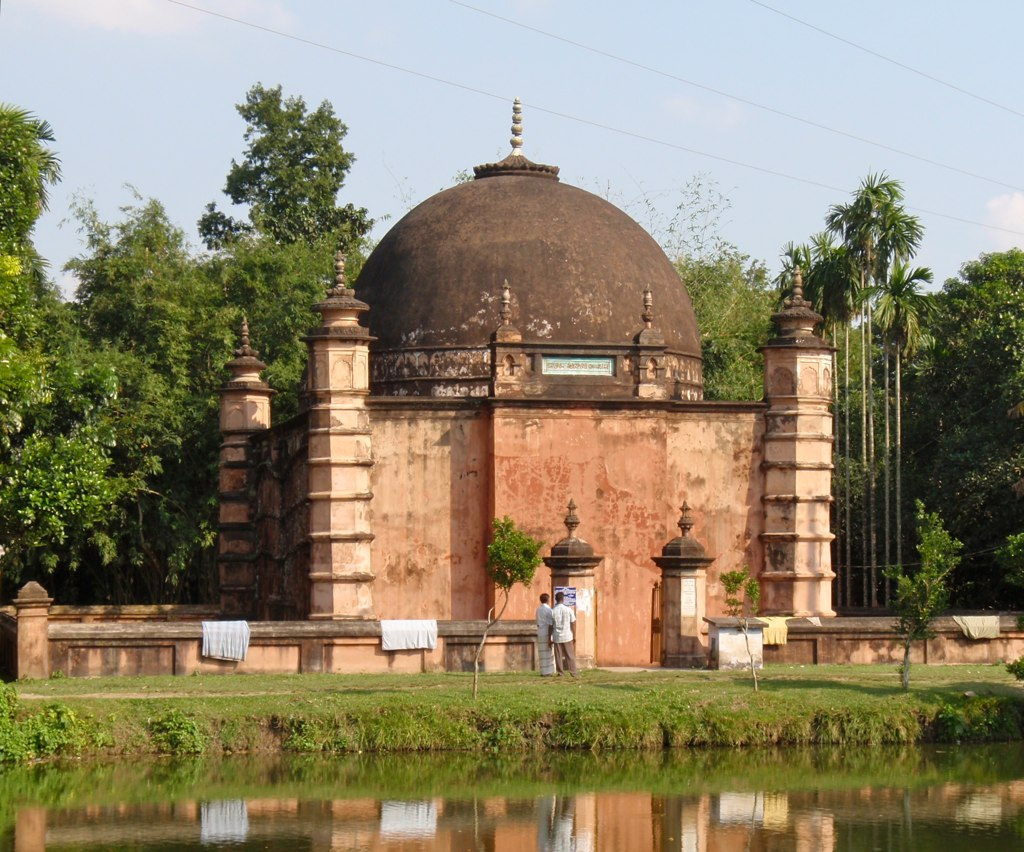
Atia Mosque

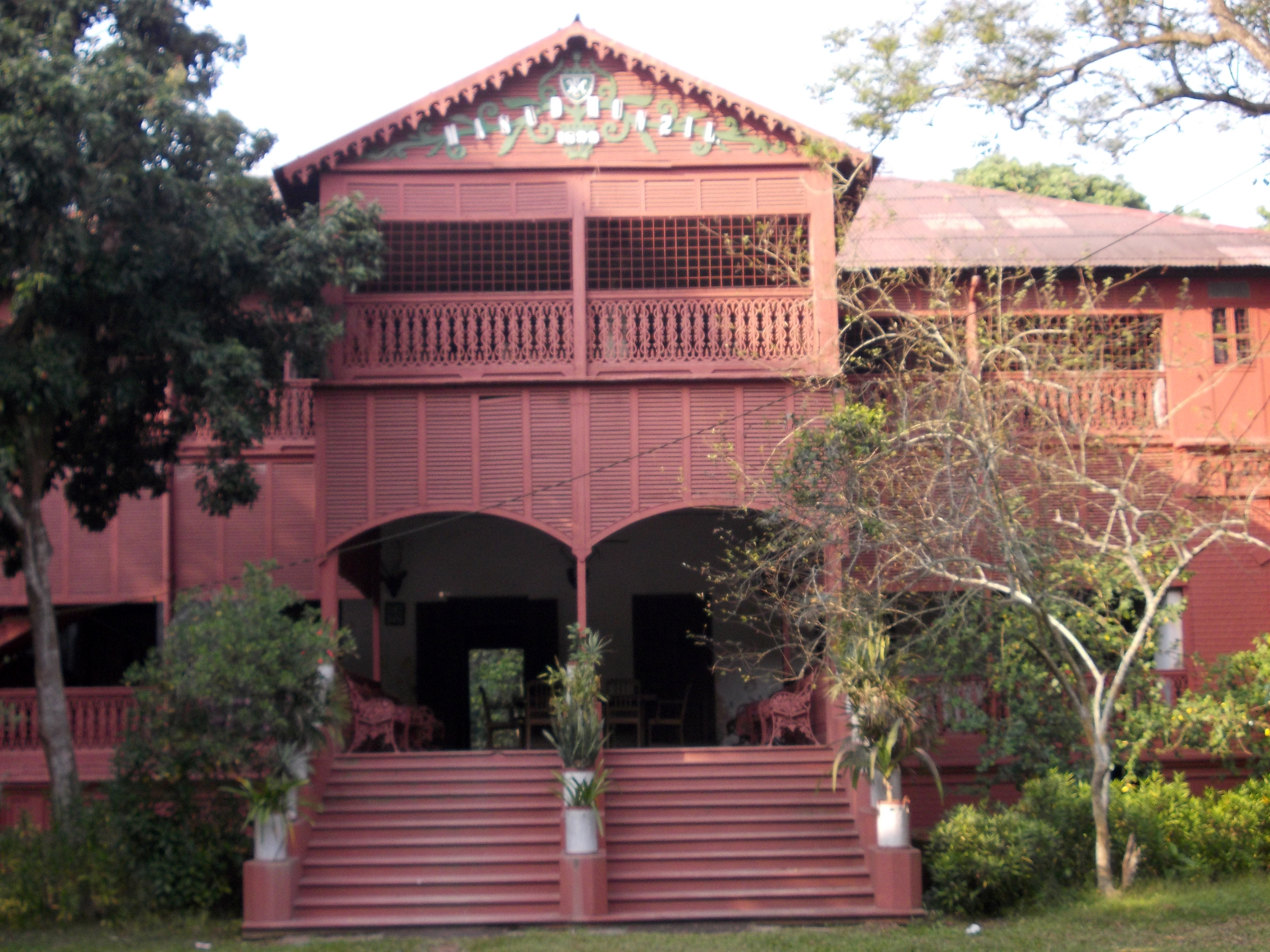
Karatia zamindar house
