= Government Saadat College =

College in Tangail, Bangladesh

- Karatia College
- Motto: "আলোকিত মানুষ সৃষ্টি করা"
- Motto in English: To create enlightened human being
- Type: Public
- Established: June 1, 1926; 100 years ago
- Affiliations: National University, Bangladesh
- Vice-Chancellor: A. S. M. Amanullah
- Principal: Professor.Parven Akter
- Vice Principal: সৈয়দ শরিফ ইস্পাহানি
- Faculty: 126
- Students: 14,124
- Undergraduates: 11,113
- Postgraduates: 3,011
- Location: Karatia, Tangail, 1903, Bangladesh
- Campus: 37.07 acres (15.00 ha); Suburban
- Language: Bengali
- Website: www.saadatcollege.gov.bd

Government Saadat College (Bengali: সরকারী সা'দত কলেজ) is an old public college in Karatia, Tangail, Bangladesh. It is often referred to as Karatia College. It was established in July 1926. The college is located at Karatia near the Dhaka-Tangail highway and about 7 kilometres (4.3 mi) from the Tangail district. First Principal of the college Ibrahim Khan who is the Founder and Principal of Bhuapur College at Bhuapur, Tangail. Later named Ibrahim Khan Govt. College.

== History ==
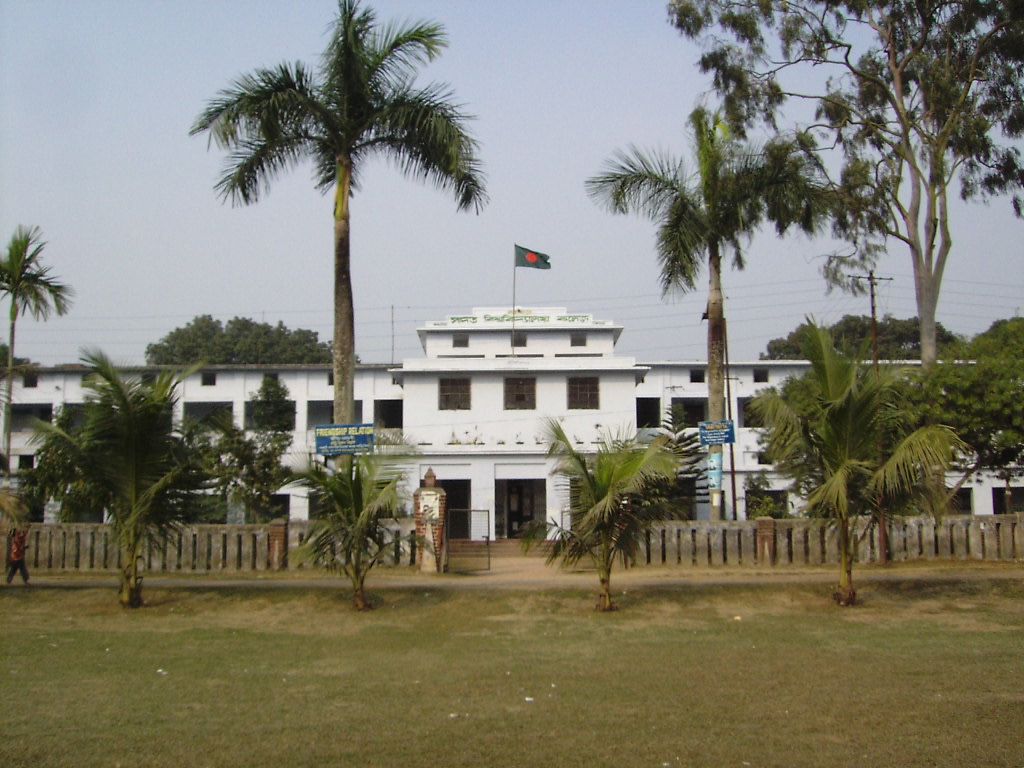
Main administrative building

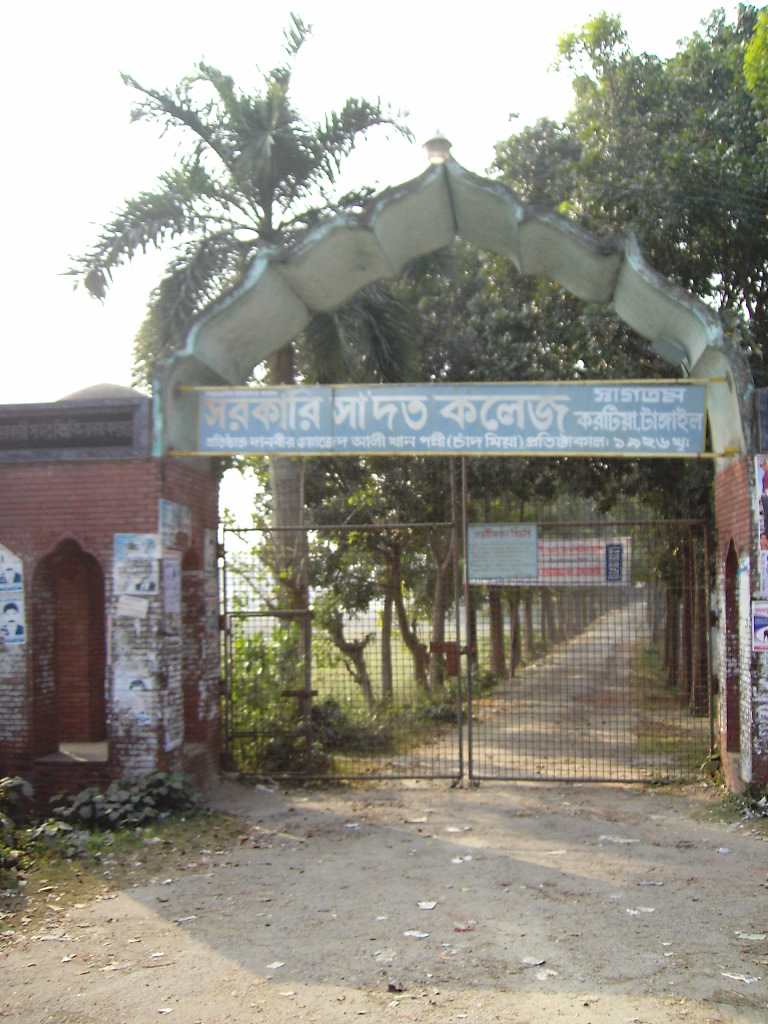
Entrance to Saadat College

Sadat college is the first college in Bangladesh established by a Muslim Zamindar. It was founded by Wazed Ali Khan Panni, a zamindar and educationalist of Tangail. He named it after his grandfather Saadat Ali Khan Panni. The founder member of Saadat college was Principal Ibrahim Khan. He was the first chief executive of the college. He worked in college till 1947. The college was upgraded as a degree college in 1938. In Saadat college, the Honours course was commenced in 1966 and the Masters course was commenced in 1974. The Government of Bangladesh promulgated the Saadat college as a national university college on July 7, 1979. It has Honours programme in 16 subjects and Masters programme in 10 subjects. The college is recognised as a postgraduate college. The college played a vital role in the liberation war of Bangladesh.

== Faculties and departments ==
Saadat University comprises following four faculties:

Faculty of Arts (B.A)

- Department of English
- Department of Bengali
- Department of History
- Department of Philosophy
- Department of Islamic history and culture
- Department of Islamic study

Faculty of Science (B.SC)

- Department of Physics
- Department of Chemistry
- Department of Math
- Department of Zoology
- Department of Botany

Faculty of Social Science (B.S.S)

- Department of Economics
- Department of Social welfare
- Department of Political science

Faculty of Commerce (B.B.A.)

- Department of Accounting
- Department of Management
- Department of Marketing
- Department of Banking & Finance

The college offers Master degree in English, Zoology, Chemistry, Mathematics.

== Facilities and social organisations ==
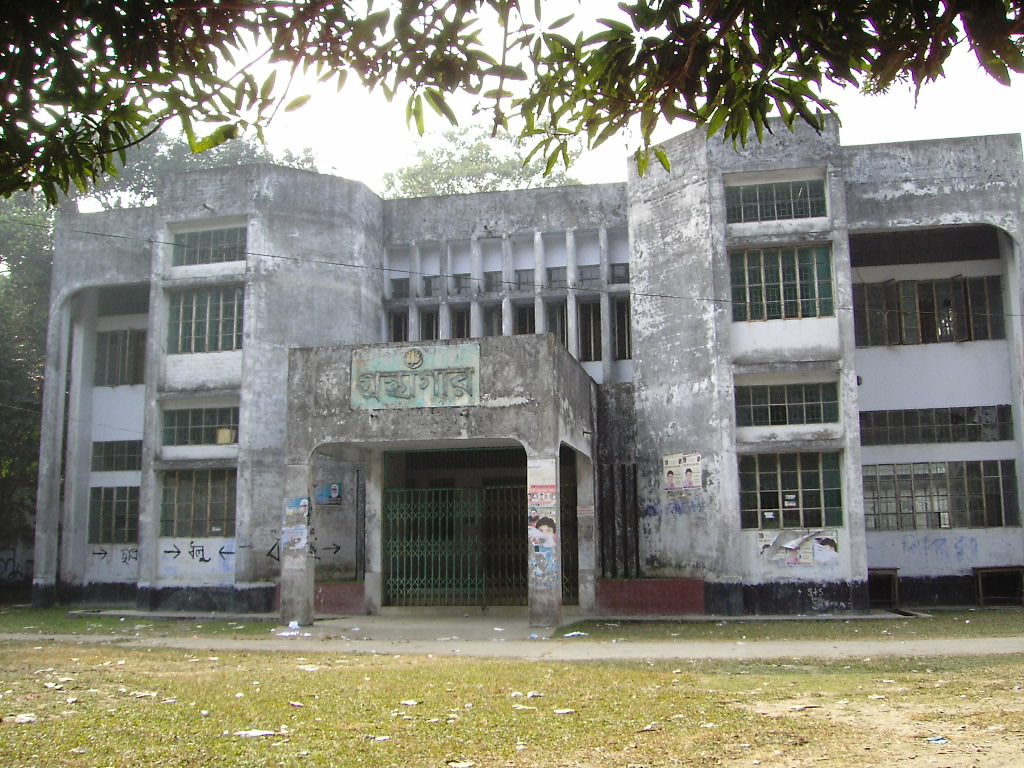
Central Library

The main building of this college is surrounded within 27 acres (110,000 m^{2}) of area. Inside the campus area there are one college auditorium, two students' common room, one central library, Health services, one sports office, one B.N.C.C office room, one Rover scouts office, one Mosque and one canteen available for students. There are 5 laboratories available for science faculty - (I) Physics (ii) Chemistry (iii) Math (iv) Zoology and (v) Botany. The college also has 16 seminar rooms.

The college library has 200 rare medieval manuscripts, including some other manuscripts written by Shahnama. Since its inception, the college has been providing lodging facilities for its students.

=== BNCC Unit ===
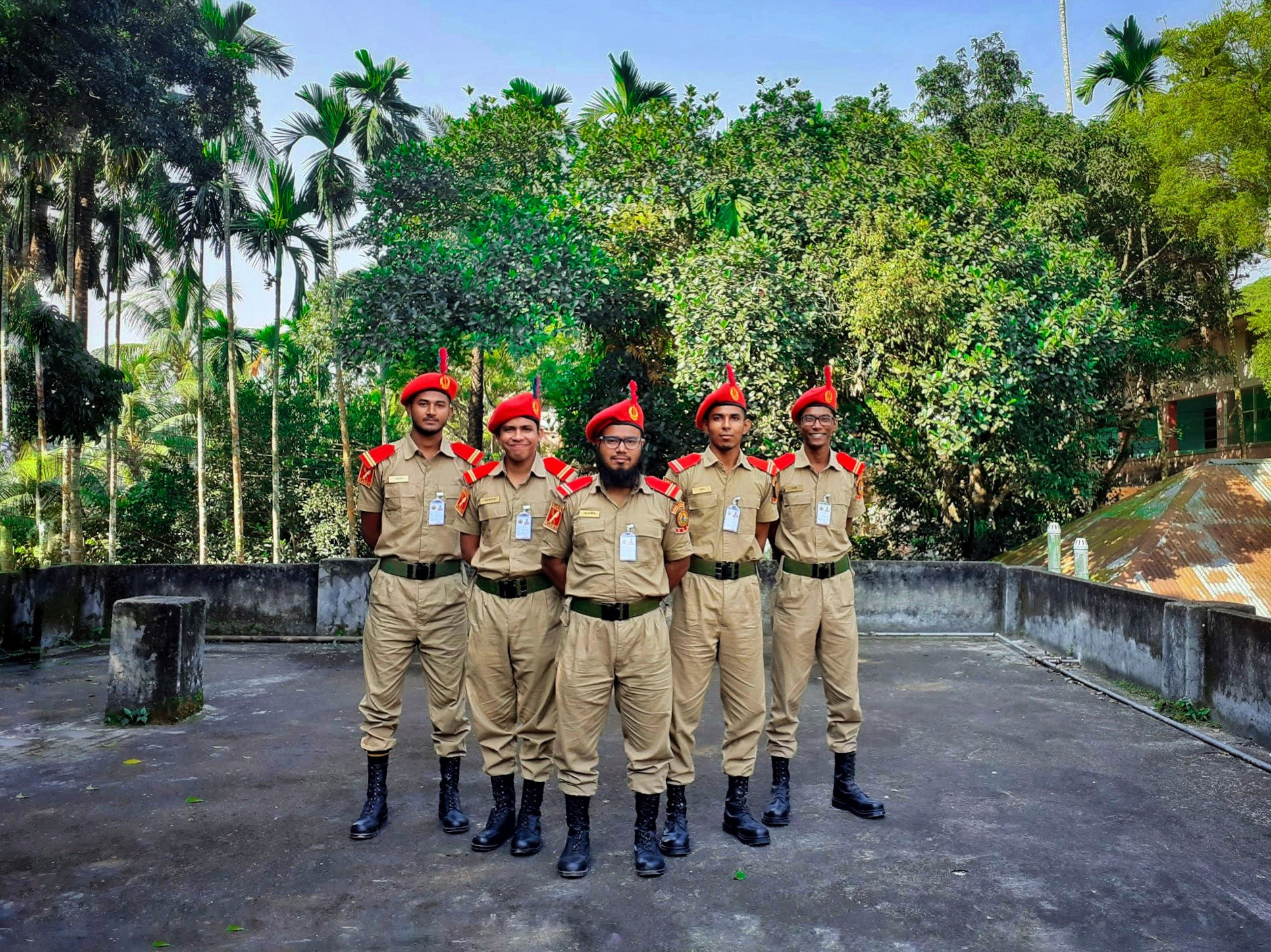
Saadat College BNCC Cadets

After the establishment of the Bangladesh National Cadet Corps, The BNCC made its debut at Government Saadat College. The unit's first P.U.O. Md. Abdul Majid and the first C.U.O. Md. Nobi Haider Badal. From that point inwards, the unit of Saadat College BNCC got modernized through the many changes and the arrival of the BNCC Women's Platoon on 1 August 2018. The cadets of Saadat College have been able to play a vital role in the development activities undertaken for the welfare of the country and the nation. The unit hopes to establish itself as a second-class self-contained military unit in the future.

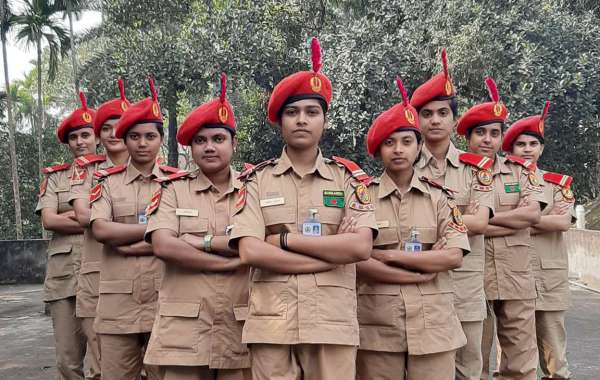
BNCC Girls Cadets

== Halls of residence ==
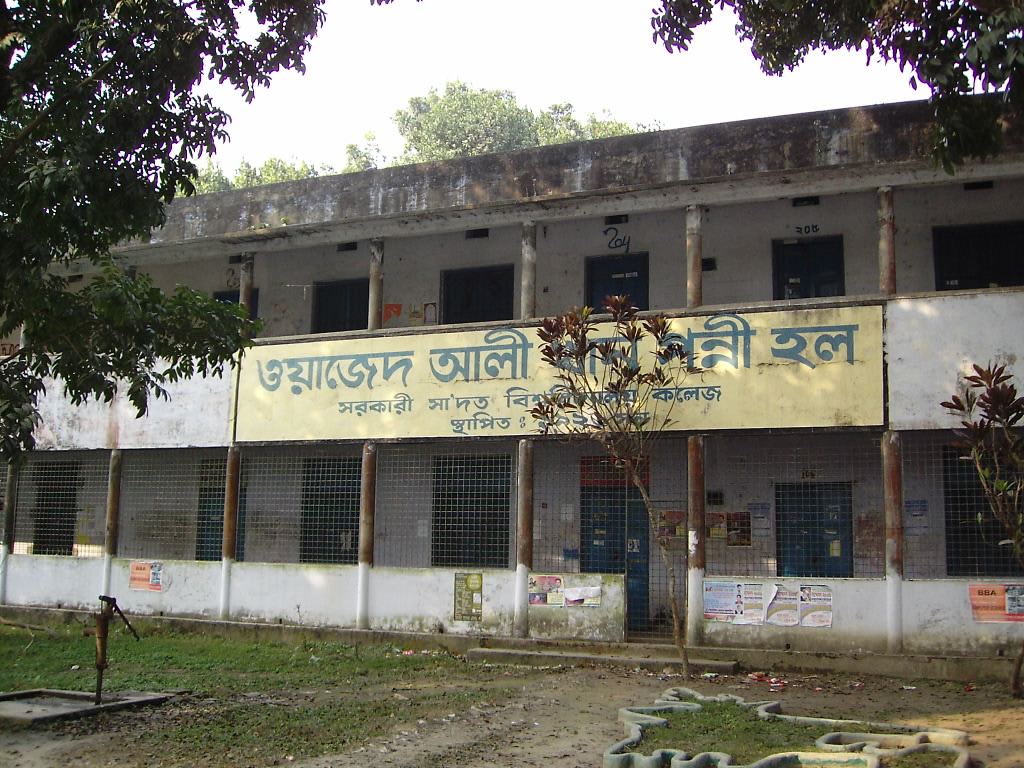
Wazed Ali Khan Panni Hall

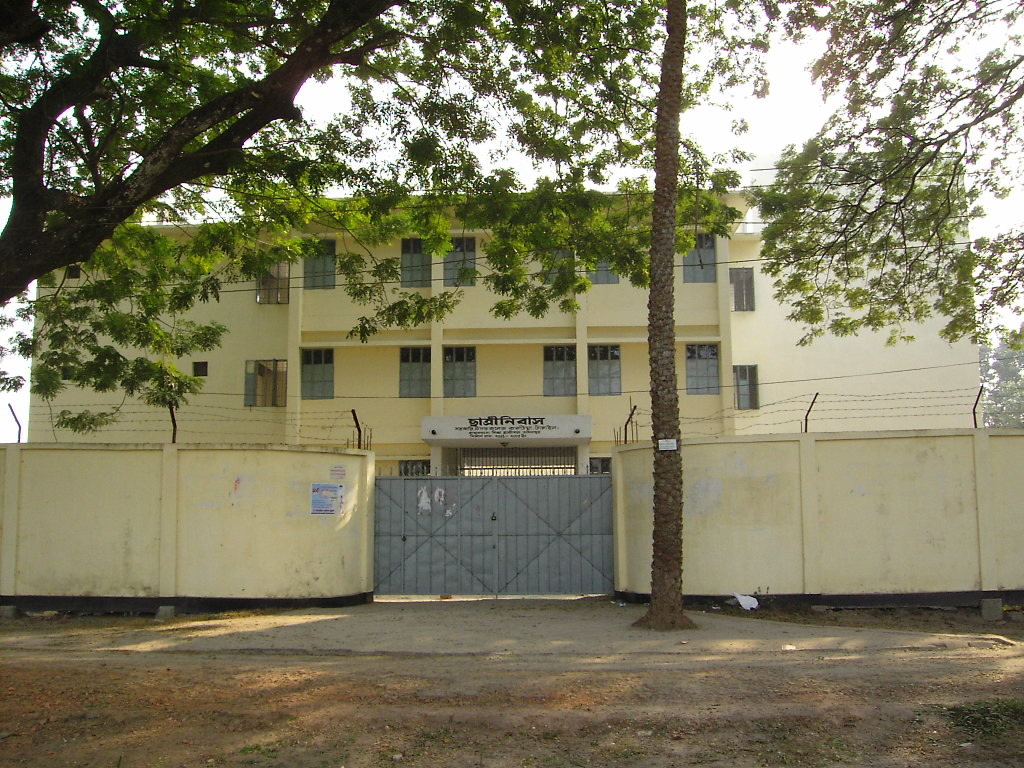
Chhatrinibas Hall

There are 6 halls to provide a convenient accommodation for Saadat college students. The 4 for males and the other 2 is for females. The halls for male students are:

- Wazed Ali Khan Panni Hall
- Ebrahim Khan Hall
- Somman Hall
- Uttara Hall

And the halls for female students are:

- Fazilatunnesa Hall
- Chhatrinibas Hall

In addition, More steps are being taken to increase accommodation for female students.

== Notable alumni ==
Some of the notable alumni of Government Saadat College.

- Abdul Haque (Writer)
- Bonde Ali Mia (Poet)
- Osman Ghani Khan (Former chairman of the United Nations Board of Auditors)
- P. C. Sorcar (Magician)
- Selim Al Din (Dramatist)
- Shajahan Siraj (Ex-minister)
- Shamsul Haque (First Secretary of Awami Muslim League)
- Janab Abdus Sattar (1911–1965), member of the Constituent Assembly of India

== Notable staff ==
- Khan Bahadur Abdul Hakim CIE (1905–1985), mathematician

== See also ==
- Karatia, Tangail
