= Wajed Ali Khan Panni =

Bengali zamindar and politician (1871–1936)

Maulvi Wajed Ali Khan Panni Zamindar of Karatia
- ওয়াজেদ আলী খান পন্নী
- Born: 14 November 1871; Karatia, Tangail, Bengal Presidency, British India
- Died: 25 April 1936 (aged 64); Karatia, Tangail, Bengal Presidency, British India
- Other name: Chand Mian
- Title: Atiar Chand
- Father: Hafez Mahmud Ali Khan Panni
- Relatives: Khwaja Salimullah (brother-in-law)

Wajed Ali Khan Panni (Bengali: ওয়াজেদ আলী খান পন্নী; 14 November 1871 – 25 April 1936), also known by his daak naam Chand Mian (Bengali: চাঁদ মিঞা), was a Bengali politician, educationist and the zamindar of Karatia.

== Early life ==
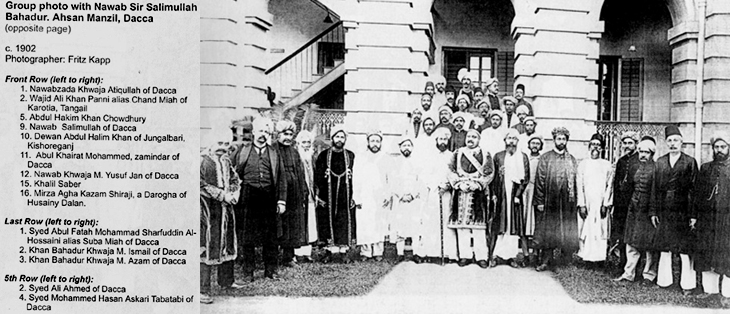
Panni pictured with the Muslim elite of Dacca.

Panni was born into a Bengali Muslim family in Karatia, Tangail, Bengal Presidency in 1871. His father, Hafez Mahmud Ali Khan Panni, belonged to the Karatia Zamindari, a wealthy landowning family in the area. Their forefathers were Pashtuns of the Panni tribe, and had migrated from Afghanistan during the Mughal period. Panni was homeschooled by private tutors and learned Arabic, Bengali, English, Persian, and Urdu.

== Career ==
In 1892, Panni assisted the poet Naimuddin in translating the Fatawa-e-Alamgiri into four volumes in Bengali, with his father's patronage.

At the start of the 20th century, Panni ordered the digging of a canal, known as Katakhali, in order to aid communication in Tangail. Panni in 1909 aided Abu Ahmad Ghuznavi Khan, the Zamindar of Delduar, in repairing the Atia Mosque, which was founded by his ancestor, Sayeed Khan Panni.

Panni helped his brother-in-law Nawab of Dhaka Khwaja Salimullah organise the Muslim Education Conference in Karatia in 1913. He founded two schools in Karatia after the conference: Hafez Mahmud Ali Khan High School, named after his father, and Rokeya Aliyah Madrasah, named after his wife. He served as the head of the Mymensingh District Khilafat movement committee and the unit of All India Congress, serving as vice-president of the Bengal Provincial Congress Committee. He was jailed for his role in the Khilafat movement in December 1921.

Panni founded Saadat College in July 1926, named after his grandfather Saadat Ali Khan Panni, which was one of the country's first five university colleges and the first college in rural Bengal. He was a philanthropist who spent 20 percent of his own income on charity work. As a landlord, he was known to have been fair to his ryots/tenants and waived rent in case of natural disasters such as famine or flood. Panni also established a Sharia department in his land, which was engaged by 700 Islamic scholars.

Panni also established the Karatia Zamindar Bari (Karatia Palace), and one of the buildings, Rokeya Manzil, was named after his wife.

Panni died in 1936.
