= Bindu Basini Govt. Boys' High School =

Bindu Basini Government Boys' High School
- বিন্দুবাসিনী সরকারি বালক উচ্চ বিদ্যালয়

Location
- Kabi Nazrul Avenue; Tangail, 1900; Bangladesh; 24.25068°N 89.913479°E

Information
- Former names: Graham English High School; Bindubasini High School
- Type: Public boys' high school
- Motto: শিক্ষাই আলো (Education is light)
- Established: April 3, 1880 (146 years ago)
- School board: Dhaka Education Board
- Chairman: Deputy Commissioner of Tangail
- Headmaster: Md. Abdur Rajjak Mia (Acting Headmaster)
- Staff: 10
- Teaching staff: 50
- Grades: Class VI-X
- Enrollment: 1800
- Language: Bengali
- Campus type: Urban
- Athletics: Cricket, Football
- Nickname: Bindubasinians
- Publication: Bindu
- Website: www.bindubasiniboys.pro.bd

Bindu Basini Government Boys' High School is a secondary school in Tangail, Bangladesh. It was established in 1880. The school was patronized and endowed by Bindubasini Chowdhurany.

== History ==
On April 3, 1880, the school started operation as a minor school at East Adalatpara neighborhood in Tangail. After a short while it was upgraded to a high school by some enthusiasts and government officials. The school was named Graham English High School after then deputy magistrate of Mymensingh Harold Graham. The school went through financial crisis for about three years after establishment. The authorities handed over the school to the prominent zamindar of Dhanbari Nawab Bahadur Syed Nawab Ali Chowdhury for financial benefits. He aided with operational costs for about two years.

Then all the expenses of the school were taken over by Rani Bindubasini Roy Chowdhurany. She was the consort of Dwarkanath Roy Chowdhury, zamindar of Panch Anna portion of Santosh. The school was renamed as Bindubasini High School in recognition of her support. For the first time in 1886, 20 candidates appeared in the entrance examination from the school. Of them, 14 passed in first division and 6 passed in second division with merit under her efficient management. The zamindar brothers Pramathanath Roy Chowdhury and Sir Manmathanath Roy Chowdhury satisfied with this. They donated the lands of present premises of the school, dormitories, municipal park, and other lands to the school named after their mother. They patronized the school and established facilities such as buildings, laboratory and library. Mrs. Chowdhurany carried the responsibility until she formed a trust in 1910 and handed over the responsibility to the board of trustees. The school was being operated with government support fund by the school managing committee headed by the mahakuma or district administrator till January 31, 1970. The school was nationalized on February 1, 1970, and it started to operate as a double shift school in 1991. The school achieved the status of best high school in Bangladesh in 1996. Ever since its establishment, the school has been making outstanding contributions to the spread of education in the Indian subcontinent as well as across the world.

On the premises of the school, National Awami Party leader Maulana Bhashani, at a mass rally, announced his support for the freedom fighters on March 11, 1971.

In October 2022, the students of the school protested the move of the municipal corporation to demolish the walls of the school to widen road.

== Result ==
Secondary School Certificate (SSC)
Year	Candidate	Passed	GPA 5	Pass rate	Note
2001	320	248	1	77.5%	
2002	382	334	1	87%	
2003	321	271	7	84.42%	
2004	318	259	36	81.44%	
2005	344	310	48	90.12%	
2006	329	310	76	94.23%	
2007	279	260	71	93.19%	
2008	281	281	173	100%	Ranked 8th
2009	253	251	137	99.21%	
2010	239	239	155	100%	
2011	277	277	242	100%	Ranked 5th
2012	343	342	225	99.7%	
2013	359	355	240	98.89%	Ranked 18th
2014	371	370	335	99.73%	Ranked 10th
2015	373	373	330	100%	Ranked 5th
2016	417	417	362	100%	Ranking system defunct
2017	410	410	361	100%	Ranking system defunct
2018	364	364	268	100%	Ranking system defunct
2019	361	360	272	99.72%	Ranking system defunct
2020	360	360	226	100%	Ranking system defunct
2021	366	364	288	99.45%	Ranking system defunct
2022	360	358	334	99.44%	Ranking system defunct

== Organization structure ==
=== Governance ===
The chairman of the school is the deputy commissioner of Tangail. The school is headed by a headmaster. There are two assistant headmasters in the school for two shifts.

=== Subjects ===
- Bengali
- English
- Mathematics
- Social science
- Islamic studies
- Physical science
- Biology
- Business studies
- Geography
- Agriculture
- Physical education
- Fine arts

=== Buildings ===
- Administrative building
- Academic building 1
- Academic building 2
- Science building
- Multipurpose building
- Dormitory
- Residence of the headmaster
- Mosque

=== Rooms ===
- Common room
- Meeting room
- Room of the headmaster
- Office of the headmaster
- Office of the assistant headmaster
- Computer laboratory
- Science laboratory
- Scout den
- BNCC room
- Indoor sports room
- School museum
- Agriculture room
- Library
- Classroom

=== Gardens ===
- Flower garden
- Fruit garden
- Herb garden
- Forest garden

=== List of Headmasters ===
No.	Name	Qualification	Took office	Left office
1	Gobinda Chandra Niyogee	Undergraduate	April 3, 1880	December 31, 1909
2	Jogendra Chandra Chakraborty	B.A.	January 1, 1910	January 2, 1956
3	Md. Danes Ali	B.A., B.T.	January 3, 1956	September 7, 1959
4	Nizamuddin Miya	B.A., B.Ed.	September 8, 1959	December 31, 1963
5	Md. Abdur Razzak	B.A., B.Ed.	January 1, 1964	June 30, 1964
-	Md. Abdus Samad Talukder (In charge)	B.Sc., B.Ed.	July 1, 1964	May 16, 1965
6	Sadek Ali	M.A., M.Ed.	May 17, 1965	January 30, 1967
7	Md. Abdur Razzak	B.A., B.Ed.	January 31, 1967	May 29, 1970
-	SM Nurul Amin (In charge)	B.A., B.Ed.	May 30, 1970	July 29, 1970
8	Md. Tazul Islam	M.A. (Ed.), B.E.S.	July 30, 1970	May 7, 1976
9	Mohiuddin Ahmed	M.A. (Ed.), B.E.S.	May 8, 1976	July 3, 1978
10	Md. Abdul Mannan	M.A. (Ed.), B.E.S.	July 4, 1978	July 30, 1979
11	Shah Md. Azizul Haque Chowdhury	B.A. (Hons.), B.T.B.E.S.	July 31, 1979	April 6, 1981
12	Md. Shams Uddin Mian	M.A. (Ed.)	April 6, 1981	December 20, 1986
-	Md. Moslem Uddin (In charge)	M.A.	December 21, 1986	December 31, 1986
13	Md. Nazirul Islam	B.Sc., B.Ed.	January 1, 1987	October 30, 1987
-	Md. Moslem Uddin (In charge)	M.A.	October 31, 1987	May 31, 1988
-	SM Nurul Amin (In charge)	B.A., B.Ed.	May 31, 1988	November 1, 1988
14	Md. Nuruzzaman	M.A., B.Ed.	November 1, 1988	March 16, 1993
-	Sader Ali Mian (In charge)	M.A. in Education	March 16, 1993	May 30, 1993
-	SM Nurul Amin (In charge)	B.A., B.Ed.	May 30, 1993	October 5, 1993
15	Md. Alauddin Bhuyyan	M.A., B.Ed.	October 5, 1993	August 1, 1995
-	Hasna Begum (In charge)	B.A., B.Ed.	January 8, 1995	February 25, 1995
16	Abdul Halim Mian	B.Com., B.Ed.	February 25, 1995	September 27, 1995
17	Md. Matiur Rahman	B.Sc., M.Ed.	September 27, 1995	November 24, 1996
-	Md. Abdul Kader (In charge)	B.Sc., B.Ed.	November 24, 1996	April 25, 1997
18	AKM Abu Taher Mian	B.Sc., M.Ed.	April 26, 1997	August 25, 2002
19	Md. Abdul Karim	M.A., B.Ed.	August 26, 2002	December 11, 2003
-	Babu Ananda Kumar Sarkar (In charge)	B.Com., B.Ed.	December 11, 2003	July 7, 2004
-	Md. Sohrab Ali (In charge)	B.A., B.Ed.	July 7, 2004	August 15, 2004
20	Md. Abdul Karim	M.A., B.Ed.	August 15, 2004	August 31, 2024

== Extracurricular ==
=== Bindu Basini Boys' Computer Club ===
Bindubasini Government Boys' High School Computer Club (BBCC) was established in 2026. The current President of the club is Md. Samir Talukdar Apurbo. The Club Room is located on the 3rd floor of the Multipurpose Building, while the Computer Lab is situated on the 3rd floor of the Administrative Building.

The club's Advisor is Mr. Tofazzal Hossain, the headmaster of Bindu Basini Government Boys' High School.

=== Cricket ===
The school became the champion in 13th and 17th National School Cricket Tournament respectively in 1995 and 1999.

=== Football ===
Every year, on the second, third and fourth day of Eid al-Adha, Bindu Basini Football Championship is held in Tangail Stadium. On the initiative of 2008 batch, the first season of BBFC was organized in 2016 with the participation of current and former students of Bindu Basini Government Boys High School.

==== Teams ====
- Tangail Avengers 97
- Class of Millennium
- Bindu 1
- Kingbodonti 4
- Durlov 5
- Pottoyi 6
- Nirvik 7
- Degree 8
- Shunno 9
- Odommo 10
- Onirban 11
- Bayal Boys 12
- Biddhongshi 13
- Projjolon 14
- Nobarun 15
- Duranta 16
- Durbar 17
- Durnibar 18
- Oroddho 19
- Udoyon 20
- Amor 21
- Proloy 22
- Torannito 23
- Pranobonto 24
- Projonmo 25
- Sapnik 26
- Ojeyo 27

=== Scout ===
The scout team of the school became champion in sub-divisional rally in 1962.

== Notable alumni ==
Name	Class year	Notability	Reference(s)
Abu Sayeed Chowdhury		The 2nd President of Bangladesh	
Mirza Nurul Huda		The 3rd Vice President of Bangladesh, former Governor of East Pakistan, former Minister of Finance of East Pakistan	
Debesh Bhattacharya		Jurist	
Abdul Mannan		Former Home Minister, former Minister of Health	
Manik Bandopadhyay		Novelist	
Anupam Ghatak		Composer	
Khandaker Asaduzzaman		1st Secretary of Finance of Bangladesh	
Shajahan Siraj		Former Minister of Environment, former vice chairman of Bangladesh Nationalist Party	
Abdul Latif Siddiqui		Former Minister of Textiles and Jute, former Minister of Posts, Telecommunications and Information Technology	
Abdul Kader Siddique		Bir Uttom, Leader of Kaderia Bahini	
Shamsur Rahman Khan Shahjahan		Former MP	
Fazlur Rahman Faruque		Chairman, Tangail District Council, received Ekushey Padak, former MP	
Mirza Tofazzal Hossain Mukul		Received Ekushey Padak, former MP	
Shawkat Momen Shahjahan		Former MP, former lecturer of Bangladesh Agricultural University	
Anwar Ul Alam Shaheed		Former colonel, Bangladesh Army, former secretary, Ministry of Foreign Affairs, former Ambassador of Bangladesh to Spain and to Bahrain	
Hassan Mahmood Khandker		26th Inspector General of Bangladesh Police, 6th Director General Rapid Action Battalion	
Md. Sanowar Hossain		Member of Parliament	
Ataur Rahman Khan		Member of Parliament	
Amanur Rahman Khan Rana		Former Member of Parliament	
Al Mujahidi		Poet	
Khondker Abdul Awal Rizvi		Director, National Institute of Traumatology and Orthopedic Rehabilitation	
Abdus Salam		Former chairman of Ekushey Television	
Kamrul Hasan Khan		7th Vice Chancellor of Bangabandhu Sheikh Mujib Medical University	
Abdul Basit Khan		Neurosurgeon	
Niranjan Mandal		Former Director General, Bangladesh Civil Service Administration Academy	
