= Shah Jahan (disambiguation) =

Shah Jahan may refer to:

== People ==
- Qutb al-Din Shah Jahan (died 1305), Ruler of Kirman
- Shah Jahan I (1592–1666), Mughal Emperor
- Shah Jahan II (1696–1719), Mughal Emperor
- Shah Jahan III (1711–1772), Mughal Emperor
- Shah Jahan IV (1788), Mughal Emperor
- Shah Jahan Begum (1838–1901), Queen of Bhopal from 1868 until 1901
- Shah Jahan Begum, second First Lady of India
- Shamsur Rahman Khan Shahjahan (1933–2012), Bangladeshi politician
- Mohammad Shahjahan Alamdangi (born 1935), Bangladeshi politician
- Muhammad Shahjahan (1939–2000), 6th vice-chancellor of Bangladesh University of Engineering and Technology
- Mosharraf Hossain Shahjahan (1939–2012), Bangladeshi former State Minister of Religious Affairs
- Shahjahan Mia Patuakhali (1940–2023), Bangladeshi former State Minister of Religious Affairs
- Shahjahan Miah Nawabganji (born 1947), Bangladeshi politician
- Shahjahan Omar (born 1947), Bangladeshi former State Minister of Law, Justice and Parliamentary Affairs
- A. S. Mohammad Shahjahan (1941–2019), Bangladeshi government police officer, civil servant and educator
- Shajahan Siraj (1943–2020), Bangladeshi politician
- A. B. Mohammad Shahjahan (1948–2014), Bangladeshi former State Minister of Jute
- A. K. Mohammad Shahjahan Kamal (1950–2023), Bangladeshi former Minister of Civil Aviation and Tourism
- Shawkat Momen Shahjahan (1951–2014), Bangladeshi lecturer and politician
- Shah Jahan Lahori (born 1952), Pakistani politician
- Shajahan Khan (born 1952), Bangladeshi former Shipping Minister
- Muhammad Arif Shah Jahan (born 1954), Afghan Hazara politician
- Md. Shahjahan Ali Talukder (1954–2020), Bangladeshi lawyer and politician
- Mohammad Shahjahan, Bangladeshi rear admiral
- Gazi Shahjahan Jwel (born 1960), Bangladeshi politician
- M. O. H. F. Shahjahan (born 1964), Indian politician
- Shahjahan Noori (1965–2011), Afghan guerilla
- Md. Shahjahan Alam Shaju (born 1967), Bangladeshi politician
- Shah Jahan Baloch (born 1972), Pakistani politician
- Anupam Shahjahan Joy (born 1985), Bangladeshi politician
- Shahjahan Hawlader Sujan (died 2001), Bangladeshi politician
- Sardar Shahjahan Yousuf, Pakistani politician
- Md. Shahjahan Noakhali, Bangladeshi politician
- Shahjahan Mahmood, Bangladeshi technocrat
- Dewan Shahjahan Yar Chowdhury, Bangladeshi politician
- Shahjahan Chowdhury, Bangladeshi film director
- Shahjahan Chowdhury Rajapalangi, Bangladeshi politician
- Shahjahan Saju, Bangladeshi politician
- Shajahan Madampat, Indian writer, critic and social commentator
- Md. Shahjahan Shahzadpuri, Bangladeshi politician
- Shajahan Chowdhury Chatgami, Bangladeshi politician
- Shajahan Khan Patuakhali, Bangladesh Nationalist Party politician
- Mohammad Shahjahan, Bangladeshi businessman and former CEO of Grameen Bank
- Shahjahan Khan (born 1995), Pakistani squash player

== Buildings ==
- Shah Jahan Mosque, Thatta, a 17th-century building that serves as the central mosque for the city of Thatta
- Shah Jahan Mosque, Woking, first purpose-built mosque in the United Kingdom

== Film ==
- Shahjehan, a 1946 Indian Hindi film about the Mughal emperor
- Shahjahan, a 2001 Indian Tamil film starring Vijay
- Shah Jahan Regency, an Indian Bengali drama film

== See also ==
- Shahjahanabad, former name of Old Delhi, built by Mughal Emperor Shah Jahan I
- Shahjahanpur (disambiguation)
