= Tangail-3 =

Constituency of Bangladesh's Jatiya Sangsad

Coordinates: 24.48°N 89.97°E

- Constituency for the Jatiya Sangsad
- District: Tangail District
- Division: Dhaka Division
- Electorate: 382,720 (2026)

Current constituency
- Created: 1973
- Party: Independent
- Member: Lutfor Rahman Khan Azad
- ← 131 Tangail-2 133 Tangail-4 →

Tangail-3 is a constituency represented in the Jatiya Sangsad (National Parliament) of Bangladesh since 2026 by independent politician Lutfor Rahman Khan Azad.

== Boundaries ==
The constituency encompasses Ghatail Upazila.

== History ==
The constituency was created for the first general elections in newly independent Bangladesh, held in 1973.

== Members of Parliament ==
| Election | Member | Party |
|---|---|---|
| 1973 | Shamsur Rahman Khan Shahjahan | Awami League |
| 1979 | Sawkat Ali Bhuiyan | Bangladesh Nationalist Party |
Major Boundary Changes
| 1986 | Shamsur Rahman Khan Shahjahan | Awami League |
| 1988 | Saidur Rahman Khan | Jatiya Party |
| 1991 | Lutfor Rahman Khan Azad | Bangladesh Nationalist Party |
| Feb 1996 | Lutfor Rahman Khan Azad | Bangladesh Nationalist Party |
| Jun 1996 | Lutfor Rahman Khan Azad | Bangladesh Nationalist Party |
| 2001 | Lutfor Rahman Khan Azad | Bangladesh Nationalist Party |
| 2008 | Mohammad Matiur Rahman | Awami League |
| 2012 by-election | Amanur Rahman Khan Rana | Independent |
| 2014 | Amanur Rahman Khan Rana | Awami League |
| 2018 | Ataur Rahman Khan | Awami League |
| 2024 | Amanur Rahman Khan Rana | Independent |
| 2026 | Lutfor Rahman Khan Azad | Independent |

== Elections ==
=== Elections in the 2020s ===
General Election 2026: Tangail-3 (Note: The vote count of 3,993 for Md. Rezaul Karim is an unofficial result published by the Dhaka Times 24. The number published by The Business Standard is an obvious data entry error.)
| Party | Candidate | Votes | % | ±% |
|---|---|---|---|---|
| Independent | Lutfor Rahman Khan Azad | 107,901 | 46.8 | N/A |
| BNP | SM Obaidul Haque | 82,769 | 35.9 | N/A |
| NCP | Saifullah Haider | 34,588 | 15.0 | N/A |
| IAB | Md. Rezaul Karim | 3,993 | 1.7 | N/A |
| Independent | Ainin Nahar | 1,087 | 0.5 | N/A |
| Majority | | 25,132 | 10.9 | N/A |
| Turnout | | 230,338 | 60.2 | N/A |
| Independent gain from Independent | | | | |

=== Elections in the 2010s ===
Amanur Rahman Khan Rana was re-elected unopposed in the 2014 general election after opposition parties withdrew their candidacies in a boycott of the election.

Matiur Rahman died in September 2012. Independent candidate Amanur Rahman Khan Rana was elected in a November 2012 by-election.

Tangail-3 by-election, November 2012
| Party | Candidate | Votes | % | ±% |
|---|---|---|---|---|
| Independent | Amanur Rahman Khan Rana | 97,808 | 63.5 | N/A |
| AL | Shahidul Islam Lebu | 44,531 | 28.9 | −32.9 |
| JP(E) | Syed Abu Yusuf Abdullah Tuhin | 11,684 | 7.6 | N/A |
| Majority | | 53,277 | 34.6 | +9.3 |
| Turnout | | 154,023 | 56.8 | −30.6 |
| Independent gain from AL | | | | |

=== Elections in the 2000s ===
General Election 2008: Tangail-3
| Party | Candidate | Votes | % | ±% |
|---|---|---|---|---|
| AL | Mohammad Matiur Rahman | 140,642 | 61.8 | +15.8 |
| BNP | Lutfor Rahman Khan Azad | 83,076 | 36.5 | −12.4 |
| Zaker Party | Khalilur Rahman | 1,627 | 0.7 | N/A |
| KSJL | Abdul Kader Siddique | 1,081 | 0.5 | −3.1 |
| IAB | Abdur Rashid | 917 | 0.4 | N/A |
| BDB | Kazi Azijul Hoque | 238 | 0.1 | N/A |
| Majority | | 57,566 | 25.3 | +22.3 |
| Turnout | | 227,581 | 87.4 | +8.7 |
| AL gain from BNP | | | | |

General Election 2001: Tangail-3
| Party | Candidate | Votes | % | ±% |
|---|---|---|---|---|
| BNP | Lutfor Rahman Khan Azad | 94,420 | 48.9 | −1.4 |
| AL | Shamsur Rahman Khan Shahjahan | 88,725 | 46.0 | +2.7 |
| KSJL | Abdul Kader Siddique | 6,964 | 3.6 | N/A |
| IJOF | Md. Abdul Kashem | 2,278 | 1.2 | N/A |
| Independent | Md. Habibur Rahman Khan | 499 | 0.3 | N/A |
| Jatiya Party (M) | Ataur Rahman Khan | 111 | 0.1 | N/A |
| Majority | | 5,695 | 3.0 | −4.0 |
| Turnout | | 192,997 | 78.7 | −0.7 |
| BNP hold | | | | |

=== Elections in the 1990s ===
General Election June 1996: Tangail-3
| Party | Candidate | Votes | % | ±% |
|---|---|---|---|---|
| BNP | Lutfor Rahman Khan Azad | 73,815 | 50.3 | −9.1 |
| AL | Shamsur Rahman Khan Shahjahan | 63,538 | 43.3 | +3.9 |
| JP(E) | S. A. S. Md. Jakaria | 6,381 | 4.3 | +4.0 |
| Jamaat | Md. Abdul Hamid | 1,732 | 1.2 | N/A |
| IOJ | Md. Yakub Ali Mian | 693 | 0.5 | N/A |
| Zaker Party | Md. Ajharul Islam | 458 | 0.3 | N/A |
| Gano Forum | Ataur Rahman Khan | 248 | 0.2 | N/A |
| Majority | | 10,277 | 7.0 | −13.1 |
| Turnout | | 146,865 | 79.4 | +19.2 |
| BNP hold | | | | |

General Election 1991: Tangail-3
| Party | Candidate | Votes | % | ±% |
|---|---|---|---|---|
| BNP | Lutfor Rahman Khan Azad | 71,157 | 59.4 | |
| AL | Shafiqur Rahman Khan | 47,141 | 39.4 | |
| CPB | Shree Kartik Chandra Dutta | 519 | 0.4 | |
| JP(E) | Saidur Rahman Khan | 390 | 0.3 | |
| JSD (S) | Md. Mahmudul Rashid Chand Miah | 291 | 0.2 | |
| Bangladesh Muslim League (Kader) | Md. Abul Kasem | 271 | 0.2 | |
| Majority | | 24,016 | 20.1 | |
| Turnout | | 119,769 | 60.2 | |
| BNP gain from JP(E) | | | | |
