= Shahjahanpur (disambiguation) =

Shahjahanpur may refer to:

== Bangladesh ==
- Shajahanpur Upazila
- Shahjahanpur Thana
- Shahjahanpur, neighbourhood in Shahjahanpur Thana, Dhaka Division

== India ==
- Shahjahanpur district, Uttar Pradesh
  - Shahjahanpur, city
    - Shahjahanpur (Assembly constituency)
    - Shahjahanpur (Lok Sabha constituency)
    - Shahjahanpur railway station
- Shahjahanpur, Ghiror, Uttar Pradesh
- Shahjahanpur, Meerut, Uttar Pradesh
- Shahjahanpur, Neemrana, Rajasthan
- Shahjahanpur, Sultanpur Lodhi, Punjab

== See also ==
- Shahjahanpuri
- Shahjahanabad, former name of Old Delhi, as built by Mughal Emperor Shah Jahan
- Shah Jahan (disambiguation)
