= Lutfor Rahman Khan Azad =

Bangladeshi politician

- লুৎফর রহমান খান আজাদ

State Minister of Expatriates' Welfare and Overseas Employment
- In office 9 July 2006 – 29 October 2006
- Preceded by: Mohammad Quamrul Islam

State Minister of NGO Affairs
- In office 6 May 2004 – 9 July 2006

State Minister of Jute
- In office 22 May 2003 – 6 May 2004
- Succeeded by: Position abolished

State Minister of Labour and Employment
- In office 11 March 2002 – 22 May 2003
- Succeeded by: Amanullah Aman

State Minister of Science and Technology
- In office 10 October 2001 – 11 March 2002

Member of Parliament for Tangail-3
- In office 5 March 1991 – 27 October 2006
- Preceded by: Saidur Rahman Khan
- Succeeded by: Mohammad Matiur Rahman

Personal details
- Party: Bangladesh Nationalist Party

Lutfor Rahman Khan Azad is a Bangladesh Nationalist Party politician and a former Jatiya Sangsad member representing the Tangail-3 constituency. He served as the state minister of 5 different ministries during 2001–2006 in the Third Khaleda Cabinet - Ministry of Science and Technology, Ministry of Labour and Employment, Ministry of Jute, Ministry of NGO Affairs, and Ministry of Expatriates' Welfare and Overseas Employment.

== Career ==
Azad was elected from Tangail-3 as a candidate of Bangladesh Nationalist Party (BNP) in 1991, 1996, and 2001. In the three elections he beat Shamsur Rahman Khan Shahjahan, candidate of Bangladesh Awami League and his cousin.

On 2 January 2010, Azad was appointed one of the international affairs secretaries of Bangladesh Nationalist Party.
