= Sawkat Ali Bhuiyan =

Bangladeshi politician

Member of Bangladesh Parliament
- In office 1979–1986
- Preceded by: Shamsur Rahman Khan Shahjahan
- Succeeded by: Shamsur Rahman Khan Shahjahan

Personal details
- Born: Dhal Para, Ghatail thana, British India
- Political party: Bangladesh Nationalist Party

Sawkat Ali Bhuiyan is a Bangladesh Nationalist Party politician and a former member of parliament for Tangail-3.

== Biography ==
Sawkat Ali Bhuiyan was born in Dhal Para village of what is now Ghatail Upazila, Tangail District, Bangladesh.

Bhuiyan was elected to parliament from Tangail-3 as a Bangladesh Nationalist Party candidate in 1979.
