= Tangail-8 =

Constituency of Bangladesh's Jatiya Sangsad

Coordinates: 24.32°N 90.17°E

- Constituency for the Jatiya Sangsad
- District: Tangail District
- Division: Dhaka Division
- Electorate: 414,826 (2026)

Current constituency
- Created: 1973
- Party: Bangladesh Nationalist Party
- Member: Ahmed Azam Khan
- ← 136 Tangail-7 138 Jamalpur-1 →

Tangail-8 is a constituency represented in the Jatiya Sangsad (National Parliament) of Bangladesh since 2026 by Ahmed Azam Khan of the Bangladesh Nationalist Party.

== Boundaries ==
The constituency encompasses Basail and Sakhipur upazilas.

== History ==
The constituency was created for the first general elections in newly independent Bangladesh, held in 1973.

== Members of Parliament ==
Election	Member	Party
1973	Fazlur Rahman Faruque	Awami League
1979	Morshed Ali Khan Panni	Bangladesh Nationalist Party
Major Boundary Changes
1986	Shawkat Momen Shahjahan	Awami League
1988	Morshed Ali Khan Panni	Jatiya Party
1991	Humayun Khan Panni	Bangladesh Nationalist Party
Feb 1996	Humayun Khan Panni	Bangladesh Nationalist Party
Jun 1996	Abdul Kader Siddique	Awami League
1999 by-election	Shawkat Momen Shahjahan	Awami League
2001	Abdul Kader Siddique	Krishak Sramik Janata League
2008	Shawkat Momen Shahjahan	Awami League
2014 by-election	Anupam Shahjahan Joy	Awami League
2018	Joaherul Islam	Awami League
2024	Anupam Shahjahan Joy	Awami League
2026	Ahmed Azam Khan	Bangladesh Nationalist Party

== Elections ==
=== Elections in the 2020s ===
General Election 2026: Tangail-8
Party	Candidate	Votes	%	±%
BNP	Ahmed Azam Khan	114,217	46.0	N/A
Independent	Salauddin Alamgir	77,130	31.0	N/A
Jamaat	Md. Shafiqul Islam Khan	55,709	22.4	N/A
JP(E)	Md. Nazrul Hasan	565	0.2	N/A
BRWP	Awal Mahmud	510	0.2	N/A
Janotar Dol	Md. Alamgir Hossain	330	0.1	N/A
Majority		37,087	14.9	N/A
Turnout		248,461	59.9	N/A
BNP gain from AL				

=== Elections in the 2010s ===
Shawkat Momen Shahjahan died in January 2014, barely two weeks after the general election. Anupam Shahjahan Joy, his son, was elected in a by-election conducted in March and April. He defeated independent candidates Md. Malek Mian, Abu Sayed Azad, and Liakat Ali, and Jatiya Party (Ershad) candidate Sadek Siddiqui.

Shawkat Momen Shahjahan was re-elected unopposed in the 2014 general election after opposition parties withdrew their candidacies in a boycott of the election.

=== Elections in the 2000s ===
General Election 2008: Tangail-8
Party	Candidate	Votes	%	±%
AL	Shawkat Momen Shahjahan	134,626	56.0	+27.1
BNP	Ahmed Aazam Khan	65,521	27.2	+0.1
KSJL	Abdul Kader Siddiqui	38,775	16.1	−26.6
Jatiya Samajtantrik Dal-JSD	Shafiul Alam	756	0.3	N/A
BRWP	Shohiduzzaman Lal Miah	567	0.2	N/A
LDP	Sheikh Faruquzzaman	293	0.1	N/A
Majority		69,105	28.7	+14.9
Turnout		240,538	88.8	+17.8
AL gain from KSJL				

General Election 2001: Tangail-8
Party	Candidate	Votes	%	±%
KSJL	Abdul Kader Siddique	80,558	42.7	
AL	Abdus Salam Khan	54,505	28.9	
BNP	Ahmed Azam Khan	51,135	27.1	
IJOF	Md. Rezaul Karim	1,306	0.7	
Independent	Nasir Uddin	877	0.5	
Jatiya Party (M)	Nilufar Yasmin	351	0.2	
Majority		26,053	13.8	
Turnout		188,732	71.0	
KSJL gain from AL				

=== Elections in the 1990s ===
Abdul Kader Siddique was expelled from the Awami League in 1999 over disagreements with party leadership. He resigned from Parliament, and stood as an independent candidate in the resulting November 1999 by-election. He lost to Shawkat Momen Shahjahan of the Awami League.

General Election June 1996: Tangail-8
Party	Candidate	Votes	%	±%
AL	Abdul Kader Siddique	100,303	62.6	+17.1
BNP	Md. Qamruzzaman Khan	35,343	22.1	−25.2
JP(E)	Shah Khaled Reza	20,485	12.8	+7.9
Jamaat	Khandakar Abdur Razzak	2,582	1.6	N/A
FP	Md. A. Based	885	0.6	N/A
Zaker Party	Md. Sohrab Ali	363	0.2	−0.1
Gano Forum	Ershadul Haque Bulbul	168	0.1	N/A
Majority		64,690	40.4	+38.6
Turnout		160,129	78.4	+23.6
AL gain from BNP				

General Election 1991: Tangail-8
Party	Candidate	Votes	%	±%
BNP	Humayun Khan Panni	61,396	47.3	
AL	Abdul Kader Siddique	59,089	45.5	
JP(E)	Morshed Ali Khan Ponni	6,309	4.9	
JSD (S)	Md. Abul Hashim	1,562	1.2	
Jatiya Jukta Front	Md. Ashraf Ali	558	0.4	
Zaker Party	Md. Abdullah Miah	322	0.3	
Jatiya Samajtantrik Dal-JSD	A. Samad	271	0.2	
NDP	Kh. Ruhul Amin Selim	233	0.2	
Majority		2,307	1.8	
Turnout		129,740	54.8	
BNP gain from JP(E)				
