= Tangail-5 =

Bangladeshi parliamentary constituency

Coordinates: 24.25°N 89.92°E

- Constituency for the Jatiya Sangsad
- District: Tangail District
- Division: Dhaka Division
- Electorate: 462,412 (2026)

Current constituency
- Created: 1973
- Party: Bangladesh Nationalist Party
- Member: Sultan Salauddin Tuku
- ← 133 Tangail-4 135 Tangail-6 →

Tangail-5 is a constituency represented in the Jatiya Sangsad (National Parliament) of Bangladesh since 2026 by Sultan Salauddin Tuku of the Bangladesh Nationalist Party.

== Boundaries ==
The constituency encompasses Tangail Sadar Upazila.

Ahead of the 2008 general election, the Election Commission redrew constituency boundaries to reflect population changes revealed by the 2001 Bangladesh census. The 2008 redistricting altered the boundaries of the constituency.

== History ==
The constituency was created for the first general elections in newly independent Bangladesh, held in 1973.

== Members of Parliament ==
Election	Member	Party
1973	Mirza Tofazzal Hossain Mukul	Awami League
1979	Abdur Rahman	Bangladesh Nationalist Party
Major Boundary Changes
1986	Mir Majedur Rahman	Jatiya Party
1988	Mahmudul Hasan	Jatiya Party
Feb 1996	Mahmudul Hasan	Bangladesh Nationalist Party
Jun 1996	Abdul Mannan	Awami League
2001	Mahmudul Hasan	Bangladesh Nationalist Party
2008	Abul Quasem	Jatiya Party (Ershad)
2012	Mahmudul Hasan	Bangladesh Nationalist Party
2014	Sanowar Hossain	Awami League
2024	Sanowar Hossain	Independent
2026	Sultan Salauddin Tuku	Bangladesh Nationalist Party

== Elections ==
=== Elections in the 2020s ===
General Election 2026: Tangail-5
Party	Candidate	Votes	%	±%
BNP	Sultan Salauddin Tuku	131,279	45.6	N/A
Jamaat	Ahsan Habib	80,283	27.9	N/A
Independent	Md. Farhad Iqbal	69,408	24.1	N/A
IAB	Khandaker Zakir Hossain	2,600	0.9	N/A
JP(E)	Md. Mozzamel Haque	1,636	0.6	N/A
BSP	Md. Hasrat Khan Bhasani	1,189	0.4	N/A
JSD (Rab)	Syed Khalequzzaman Mustafa	1,092	0.4	N/A
GOP	Md. Shafiqul Islam	263	0.1	N/A
GSA	Fatema Akter	221	0.1	N/A
BCP	A. K. M. Shafiqul islam	109	0.0	N/A
Majority		50,996	17.7	N/A
Turnout		288,080	62.3	N/A
BNP gain from Independent				

=== Elections in the 2010s ===
General Election 2014: Tangail-5
Party	Candidate	Votes	%	±%
AL	Sanowar Hossain	67,959	53.1	N/A
Independent	Murad Siddiqui	59,398	46.4	N/A
JP(E)	Sadek Siddique	400	0.3	−55.9
BNF	Ataur Rahman Khan	245	0.2	N/A
Majority		8,561	6.7	−21.7
Turnout		128,002	37.6	−48.0
AL gain from BNP				

In December 2009, the High Court declared that Quasem's 2008 candidacy had been illegal and vacated the seat. The Election Commission declared Mahmudul Hasan, the runner up, elected. After the appeals process concluded, Hasan took office in August 2012.

=== Elections in the 2000s ===
General Election 2008: Tangail-5
Party	Candidate	Votes	%	±%
JP(E)	Abul Quasem	147,152	56.2	N/A
BNP	Mahmudul Hasan	72,805	27.8	−4.4
KSJL	Murad Siddiqui	40,456	15.4	−7.3
IAB	Abu Yousuf	1,192	0.5	N/A
Zaker Party	Mahfuz Reza	319	0.1	N/A
Majority		74,347	28.4	+24.0
Turnout		261,924	85.6	+9.0
JP(E) gain from BNP				

General Election 2001: Tangail-5
Party	Candidate	Votes	%	±%
BNP	Mahmudul Hasan	96,544	32.2	+3.8
AL	Abdul Mannan	83,458	27.8	−12.2
KSJL	Murad Siddiqui	68,167	22.7	N/A
IJOF	Abul Quasem	50,266	16.8	N/A
Gano Forum	Abul Hossain	970	0.3	0.0
Bangladesh Progressive Party	Chand Imran Mirza	191	0.1	N/A
Jatiya Party (M)	A. K. Pathan Ayub	165	0.1	N/A
Majority		13,086	4.4	−6.6
Turnout		299,761	76.6	−1.2
BNP gain from AL				

=== Elections in the 1990s ===
General Election June 1996: Tangail-5
Party	Candidate	Votes	%	±%
AL	Abdul Mannan	95,903	40.0	+2.9
JP(E)	Abul Quasem	69,430	28.9	−9.5
BNP	Mahmudul Hasan	68,042	28.4	+12.8
Jamaat	Md. Shafiqur Rahman	3,997	1.7	−0.1
Gano Forum	Abul Hossain	776	0.3	N/A
IOJ	Md. Ibrahim	617	0.3	N/A
Democratic Republican Party	Md. Shahjahan Ali	344	0.1	N/A
Zaker Party	A. K. M. Asrarul Haque	282	0.1	−0.1
NAP (Bhashani)	Md. Muslem Uddin	245	0.1	N/A
Jatiya Samajtantrik Dal-JSD	Md. Altab Hossain Miah	205	0.1	N/A
Independent	Sadek Siddiqul	140	0.1	N/A
Majority		26,473	11.0	+9.6
Turnout		239,981	77.8	+19.9
AL gain from JP(E)				

General Election 1991: Tangail-5
Party	Candidate	Votes	%	±%
JP(E)	Mahmudul Hasan	74,144	38.4	
AL	Abdul Mannan	71,455	37.1	
BNP	B. Babul Chowdhury	30,168	15.6	
JSD (S)	Md. Motiur Rahman Khan	8,920	4.6	
Jamaat	Md. Nousher Ali	3,530	1.8	
Independent	Wazed Ali Khan Ponni	1,470	0.8	
NAP (Muzaffar)	Md. Moslem Uddin	1,011	0.5	
Jatiya Oikkya Front	Md. Hazrat Ali Shikdar	704	0.4	
FP	Md. Nazrul Islam Khan	463	0.2	
Zaker Party	A. K. M. Asrarul Haque	368	0.2	
Bangladesh Muslim League (Kader)	Md. Syed A. Al Wasek	318	0.2	
CPB	Joad Al Malum	300	0.2	
Majority		2,689	1.4	
Turnout		192,851	57.9	
JP(E) hold				
