= Joaherul Islam =

Bangladeshi politician (1956–2026)

- জোয়াহেরুল ইসলাম

Member of the Bangladesh Parliament for Tangail-8
- In office 30 January 2019 – 29 January 2024
- Preceded by: Shawkat Momen Shahjahan
- Succeeded by: Anupam Shahjahan Joy

General Secretary of Tangail District Awami League

Personal details
- Born: 12 February 1956 Tangail, Bangladesh
- Died: 27 February 2026 (aged 70) Kolkata, India
- Party: Bangladesh Awami League

Joaherul Islam (12 February 1956 – 27 February 2026) was a Bangladesh Awami League politician and a Jatiya Sangsad member representing the Tangail-8 constituency from 2019 to 2024. He was also a freedom fighter of 1971 Bangladesh Liberation War.

== Life and career ==
Islam was born on 12 February 1956. He served as the general secretary of Tangail District unit of Awami League in 2017. He was a lawyer by profession.

Islam was elected to the parliament on 30 December 2018 from Tangail-8 as a Bangladesh Awami League candidate.

The Awami League chose to nominate Anupam Shahjahan Joy over Islam from Tangail-8 for the 2024 general election.

After the fall of the Sheikh Hasina led Awami League government, Islam's house was vandalized then forcefully occupied by Mariam Mukaddas Miste, affiliate of the Students Against Discrimination. Islam's daughter Jakia Islam said, "There is no law or administration in the country; that's why such chaos is happening,".

== Death ==
Islam died from multiple organ failure and heart complications in Kolkata, on 27 February 2026, at the age of 70. He had been hospitalised at Phoenix Medical Center for over a week.

Following his death in India, body of Islam was returned to Bangladesh through Benapole Land Port. He was later taken to his native district of Tangail, where he was accorded a guard of honour prior to his funeral prayer, after which he was buried in his home town in accordance with Islamic rites.
