= Hasan Imam Khan =

Bangladeshi politician

- হাসান ইমাম খান
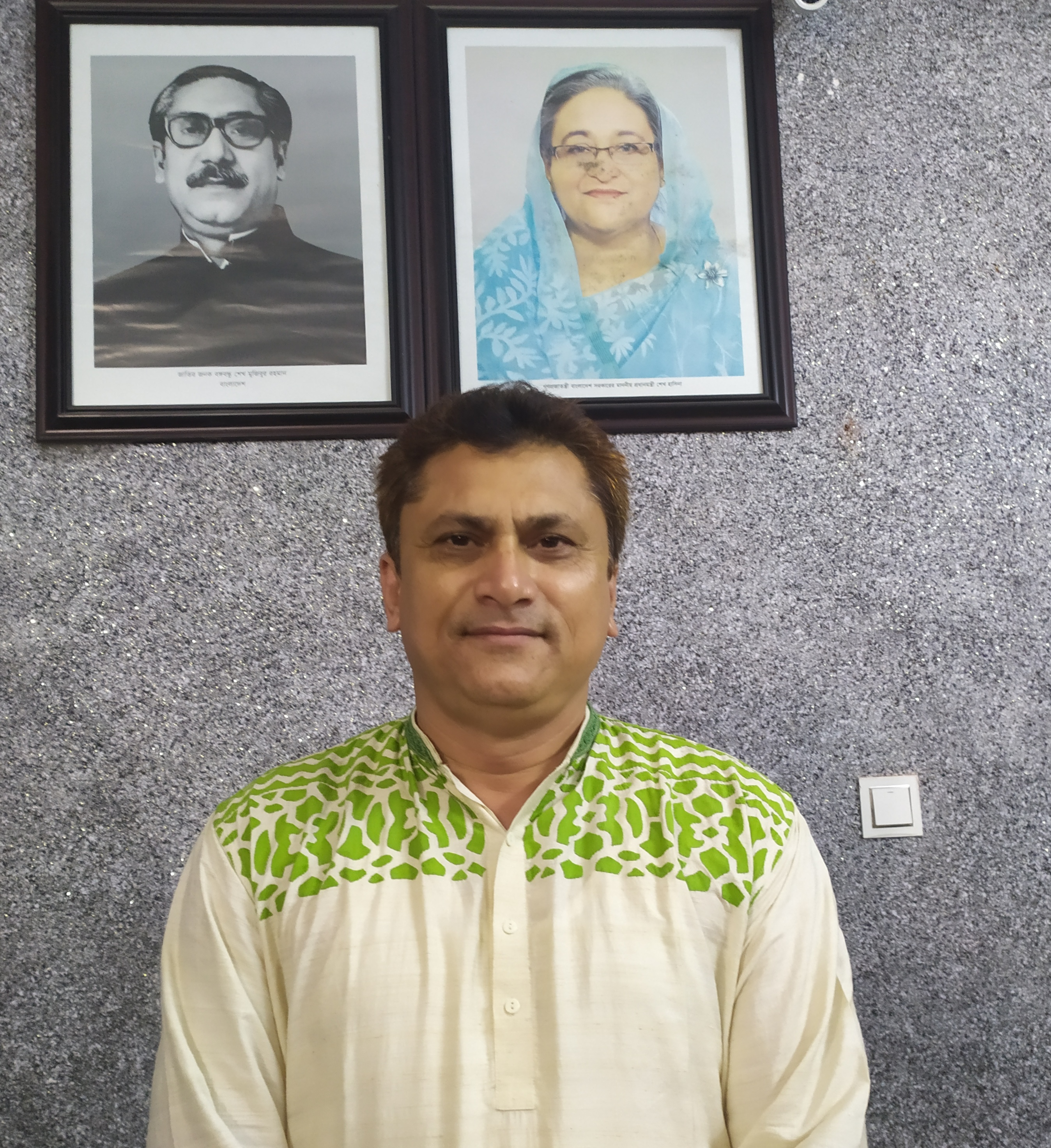

Member of Bangladesh Parliament
- In office 31 January 2017 – 9 January 2024
- Preceded by: Abdul Latif Siddiqui
- Succeeded by: Abdul Latif Siddiqui
- Constituency: Tangail-4

Personal details
- Born: 1 January 1973; Tangail District
- Political party: Bangladesh Awami League

Hasan Imam Khan, also known as Sohel Hazari, is a Bangladesh Awami League politician and a former Member of Parliament from Tangail-4. He is the former chairman of Kalihati upazila.

== Career ==
Hasan Imam Khan was a leader of Bangladesh Chhatra League. He was also a leader of Bangladesh Awami Swechasebak League. He served as the chairman of Kalihati upazila. As chairman in 2011 he helped resolve a dispute between Bangladesh Army officers and Bangladesh Awami League men during a mayoral election. Awami League men were allegedly beaten by Army personnel which caused Awami League personnel to lay seize office of the returning officer of Bangladesh Election Commission. The officers involved were withdrawn after a meeting between officers in Shahid Salahuddin Cantonment in Ghatail and Khan. He worked as the organising secretary of Bangladesh Chhatra League.

Khan was nominated by Bangladesh Awami League to contest the by-elections on 10 November 2015 in Tangail-4. The seat became vacant after the Member of Parliament Abdul Latif Siddique resigned on 1 September 2015. The election was delayed over a legal case on the candidacy of Abdul Kader Siddique, President of Krishak Sramik Janata League. On 18 January 2018, the Bangladesh Supreme Court upheld the verdict cancelling Abdul Kader Siddique's candidacy paving the way for Bangladesh Election Commission to hold the by-elections on 31 January 2017. He was elected to Parliament after winning the by-elections.
