= Abdur Rahman (Tangail politician) =

Bangladeshi politician

Member of Bangladesh Parliament
- In office 1979–1986
- Preceded by: Mirza Tofazzal Hossain Mukul
- Succeeded by: Mir Majedur Rahman

Personal details
- Political party: Bangladesh Nationalist Party

Abdur Rahman is a Bangladesh Nationalist Party politician and a former member of parliament for Tangail-5.

== Career ==
Rahman was elected to parliament from Tangail-5 as a Bangladesh Nationalist Party candidate in 1979.
