= Ahmed Azam Khan =

Bangladeshi MP and Minister

- আহমেদ আজম খান
- Khan in 2026

Minister of Liberation War Affairs
- Incumbent
- Assumed office 12 March 2026
- Prime Minister: Tarique Rahman
- Preceded by: Hafiz Uddin Ahmad

Member of Parliament
- Incumbent
- Assumed office 17 February 2026
- Preceded by: Anupam Shahjahan Joy
- Constituency: Tangail-8

Personal details
- Born: 14 January 1957 (age 69) Tangail District, East Pakistan
- Party: Bangladesh Nationalist Party
- Website: azam-khan.com

Ahmed Azam Khan (born 14 January 1957) is a Bangladeshi lawyer, politician and a vice chairman of the Bangladesh Nationalist Party (BNP). He is the incumbent Jatiya Sangsad member respresenting the Tangail-8 constituency and the incumbent Minister for Liberation War Affairs since March 2026.

Khan won the 2026 Bangladeshi general election contesting at the Tangail-8 constituency securing 114,217 votes while his nearest opponent Independent Candidate Salauddin Alamgir received 77,130 votes.

== Controversies ==
In 2026, Azam Khan faced controversy after an alleged audio recording of him threatening a local freedom fighter circulated on social media. The recording, reportedly related to disputes over a freedom fighters’ committee in the Tangail-8 constituency, prompted a general diary (GD) to be filed and drew criticism from local groups. Khan denied the allegation, claiming the audio was politically motivated.

After being appointed as minister, Azam Khan stated that Khaleda Zia was the “first freedom fighter” of the Bangladesh Liberation War. The remark drew widespread public attention and became a subject of discussion and controversy at the time.
