= Tangail-4 =

Constituency of Bangladesh's Jatiya Sangsad

Coordinates: 24.38°N 89.99°E

- Constituency for the Jatiya Sangsad
- District: Tangail District
- Division: Dhaka Division
- Electorate: 374,917 (2026)

Current constituency
- Created: 1973
- Party: Bangladesh Nationalist Party
- Member: Lutfor Rahman Khan Matin
- ← 132 Tangail-3 134 Tangail-5 →

Tangail-4 is a constituency represented in the Jatiya Sangsad (National Parliament) of Bangladesh since 2026 by Lutfor Rahman Khan Matin of the Bangladesh Nationalist Party.

== Boundaries ==
The constituency encompasses Kalihati Upazila.

== History ==
The constituency was created for the first general elections in newly independent Bangladesh, held in 1973.

== Members of Parliament ==
Election	Member	Party
1973	Abdul Latif Siddiqui	Awami League
1979	Shajahan Siraj	Jatiya Samajtantrik Dal
Major Boundary Changes
1986	Laila Siddiqui	Independent
1988	Shajahan Siraj	Jatiya Samajtantrik Dal (Siraj)
Feb 1996	Shajahan Siraj	Bangladesh Nationalist Party
Jun 1996	Abdul Latif Siddiqui	Awami League
2001	Shajahan Siraj	Bangladesh Nationalist Party
2008	Abdul Latif Siddiqui	Awami League
2017 by-election	Hasan Imam Khan Sohel Hazari	Awami League
2024	Abdul Latif Siddiqui	Independent
2026	Lutfor Rahman Khan Matin	Bangladesh Nationalist Party

== Elections ==
=== Elections in the 2020s ===
General Election 2026: Tangail-4
Party	Candidate	Votes	%	±%
BNP	Lutfor Rahman Khan Matin	105,342	46.9	N/A
Independent	Abdul Latif Siddiqui	62,509	27.8	N/A
Jamaat	Khandaker Abdur Razzak	50,192	22.3	N/A
Independent	Md. Abdul Halim Miah	4,152	1.8	N/A
IAB	Ali Amjad Hossain	1,822	0.8	N/A
JP(E)	Md. Liaquat Ali	758	0.3	N/A
Majority		42,833	19.1	N/A
Turnout		224,775	60.0	N/A
BNP gain from Independent				

=== Elections in the 2010s ===
In late 2014, Abdul Latif Siddiqui was expelled from the Awami League for criticizing the practice of hajj, which he described as a drain on the economy. He resigned from parliament on 1 September 2015. The resulting by-election was delayed by legal wrangling over whether his brother, Abdul Kader Siddique, could be a candidate. The by-election eventually took place in January 2017, and was won by Awami League candidate Hasan Imam Khan.

Tangail-4 by-election, 2017
Party	Candidate	Votes	%	±%
AL	Hasan Imam Khan	193,547	97.8	+36.8
National People's Party	Imrul Kayes	1,696	0.9	N/A
BNF	Ataur Rahman Khan	1,320	0.7	N/A
Majority		191,851	96.9	+74.2
Turnout		197,974	64.3	−25.9
AL hold				

Abdul Latif Siddiqui was elected unopposed in the 2014 general election after opposition parties withdrew their candidacies in a boycott of the election.

=== Elections in the 2000s ===
General Election 2008: Tangail-4
Party	Candidate	Votes	%	±%
AL	Abdul Latif Siddiqui	138,646	61.0	+16.3
BNP	Lutfor Rahman	86,912	38.2	−3.0
LDP	Md. Mobarok Hossain	1,239	0.5	N/A
JSD	Md. Ismail Hossain	671	0.3	N/A
Majority		51,734	22.7	+20.0
Turnout		227,468	90.2	+12.1
AL gain from BNP				

General Election 2001: Tangail-4
Party	Candidate	Votes	%	±%
BNP	Shajahan Siraj	89,916	47.5	+6.3
AL	Abdul Latif Siddiqui	84,775	44.7	−4.2
KSJL	Abdul Kader Siddique	13,747	7.3	N/A
IJOF	Asaduzzaman Babul	882	0.5	N/A
Jatiya Party (M)	Sadeq Siddiqi	132	0.1	N/A
Majority		5,141	2.7	−5.0
Turnout		189,452	78.1	−7.7
BNP gain from AL				

=== Elections in the 1990s ===
General Election June 1996: Tangail-4
Party	Candidate	Votes	%	±%
AL	Abdul Latif Siddiqui	75,581	48.9	+10.7
BNP	Shajahan Siraj	63,720	41.2	+36.2
JP(E)	Abul Kashem Ahmed	12,808	8.3	−6.8
Jamaat	Md. Amzad Hossain	2,394	1.6	N/A
Majority		11,861	7.7	+7.4
Turnout		154,503	85.8	+21.6
AL gain from JSD (S)				

General Election 1991: Tangail-4
Party	Candidate	Votes	%	±%
JSD (S)	Shajahan Siraj	51,429	38.6	
AL	Abdul Latif Siddiqui	50,967	38.2	
JP(E)	Md. A. Hamid Pramanik	20,136	15.1	
BNP	Md. Nurul Alam Tang	6,645	5.0	
Zaker Party	Md. A. Aziz	1,237	0.9	
Janata Mukti Party	Md. Waresul Hasan Siddiqui	922	0.7	
NAP (Muzaffar)	Alim Uddin Tang	795	0.6	
WPB	Hazera Sultana	605	0.5	
FP	Md. Joaher Ali	439	0.3	
Bangladesh Jatiya Tanti Dal	Md. Tofazzel Hossain	180	0.1	
Majority		462	0.3	
Turnout		133,355	64.2	
JSD (S) hold				
