= Mahmudul Hasan (general) =

Bangladeshi politician (1936–2025)

- মাহমুদুল হাসান

Minister of Home Affairs
- In office 21 March 1989 – 6 December 1990
- Prime Minister: Moudud Ahmed; Kazi Zafar Ahmed
- Preceded by: Mohammed Abdul Matin
- Succeeded by: Khaleda Zia
- In office 17 February 1986 – 1 December 1986
- Preceded by: Abdul Mannan Siddique
- Succeeded by: Mohammed Abdul Matin

Minister of Agriculture
- In office 28 March 1988 – 31 March 1989
- Prime Minister: Moudud Ahmed
- Preceded by: Mohammad Mahbubuzzaman
- Succeeded by: Mohammad Abdul Munim

Minister of Local Government, Rural Development and Co-operatives
- In office 24 March 1986 – 25 May 1986
- Preceded by: K. M. Aminul Islam
- Succeeded by: K. M. Aminul Islam
- In office 19 December 1984 – 16 February 1986
- Preceded by: Mahbubur Rahman
- Succeeded by: K. M. Aminul Islam

Minister of Housing and Public Works
- In office 16 January 1985 – 4 July 1985
- Preceded by: Mohammad Abdul Munim
- Succeeded by: Mohammed Abdul Matin

Member of the Bangladesh Parliament for Tangail-5
- In office 30 May 2012 – 24 January 2014
- Preceded by: Abul Kashem
- Succeeded by: Md. Sanowar Hossain
- In office 28 October 2001 – 27 October 2006
- Preceded by: Abdul Mannan
- Succeeded by: Abul Kashem
- In office 3 March 1988 – 30 March 1996
- Preceded by: Mir Majedur Rahman
- Succeeded by: Abdul Mannan

Personal details
- Born: 1 March 1936 Tangail District, Bengal Presidency, British India
- Died: 31 December 2025 (aged 89) Dhaka, Bangladesh
- Party: Bangladesh Nationalist Party

Military service
- Allegiance: Pakistan (Before 1972); Bangladesh
- Branch/service: Pakistan Army; Bangladesh Army
- Years of service: 1959–1986
- Rank: Major General Service number:BA–133
- Unit: Corps of Engineers
- Commands: Commander of 14th Independent Engineers Brigade; GOC of 66th Infantry Division; ENC of Army Headquarters
- Battles/wars: Indo-Pakistani War of 1965

Major General Mahmudul Hasan (Bengali: মাহমুদুল হাসান; 1 March 1936 – 31 December 2025) was a Bangladesh Nationalist Party politician and the former home minister and five time member of parliament from Tangail-5.

== Early life and education ==
He was born on 1 March 1936 in Tangail Sadar Upazila, Tangail District, Bengal Presidency, British India (now Bangladesh). He completed his bachelor's in science in 1956. Later, he obtained an engineering degree.

== Military career ==
Mahmudul Hasan was commissioned on 13 June 1959 in the Corps of Engineers of the Pakistan Army. He reached the rank of major in the Pakistan Army. After the independence of Bangladesh, Mahmudul joined the Bangladesh Army. His first posting was as commanding officer of the 1st Engineer Battalion. He was promoted to lieutenant colonel on 15 May 1974. Later, he served as the commanding officer of the 3rd and 8th Engineer Battalions. On 14 May 1977, he was promoted to colonel and was appointed station commander of Dhaka Cantonment and commander of the 14th Independent Engineers Brigade. He was promoted to brigadier on 2 December 1978. On 20 August 1980, he was appointed commander, logistics area, Bangladesh Army. He was made the engineer-in-chief of the Bangladesh Army on 13 April 1982. He was promoted to major general on 10 May 1982. He served there till 6 July 1986. He retired from the Bangladesh Army as a major general. He served in the cabinet of President Hossain Mohammad Ershad as the home minister.

== Political career ==
=== Minister of Local Government, Rural Development and Co-operatives ===
He took additional charge as the minister of local government, rural development and co-operatives on 19 December 1984. During his tenure he took several initiatives for rural development. The Local Government Engineering Department was also established during his tenure, which played a vital role in the infrastructural development of the rural areas. He was elected to the Jatiya Sangsad for the first time in 1988 from Tangail-5.

=== Minister of Agriculture ===
He took over as the minister of agriculture on 28 March 1988. After taking charge, he made many changes in the administration and field level of the Agriculture Department. He worked on increasing the irrigation system, supplying seeds and fertilizers for the farmers and increasing the gross food production of the country. During his tenure gross production rose to 19.5 million metric tons from 16.5 million metric tons despite the horrible floods in 1988. During this, Bangladesh became self-sufficient in food production for the first time.

=== Fall of Ershad and onwards ===
After the fall of Hussain Muhammad Ershad, he participated in the 1991 Bangladeshi general election. He was elected to the Jatiya Sangsad from Tangail-5 as the candidate of the Jatiya Party. Later he joined the Bangladesh Nationalist Party and was elected to the parliament from the same constituency in the February 1996 Bangladeshi general election. But the parliament lasted only for 12 days. Later another general election was held on 12 June 1996. In that election Mahmudul lost his seat to Abdul Mannan of the Awami League. He got 68,042 votes in that election and secured 3rd place after Abdul Mannan and Abul Kashem. In the 2001 Bangladeshi general election, he regained his seat and was reelected to the parliament for the 4th time.

Hasan was elected to parliament on 29 December 2012 from Tangail-5 in a by-election. The by-election was called after the Bangladesh Election Commission had cancelled the election of Jatiya Party MP Abul Kashem.

He was also the founder of Major General Mahmudul Hasan Ideal College, Tangail.

== Death ==
Hasan died in Dhaka on 31 December 2025 at the age of 89.
