= Sultan Salauddin Tuku =

Bangladesh Nationalist Party politician

- সুলতান সালাউদ্দিন টুকু
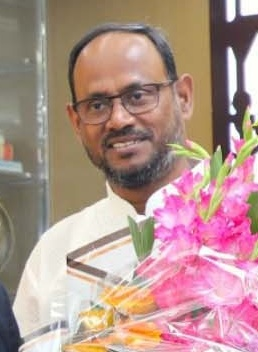
- Tuku in 2026

Minister of State for Fisheries and Livestock
- Incumbent
- Assumed office 17 February 2026
- Prime Minister: Tarique Rahman
- Preceded by: Farida Akhter

Member of Parliament
- Incumbent
- Assumed office 17 February 2026
- Preceded by: Md. Sanowar Hossain
- Constituency: Tangail-5

Minister of State for Agriculture Minister of State for Food
- In office 17 February 2026 – 4 March 2026
- Prime Minister: Tarique Rahman
- Preceded by: Iqbal Hassan Mahmood Tuku
- Succeeded by: TBA (Agriculture); Md Abdul Bari (Food)

Personal details
- Born: 1 January 1971 (age 55) Tangail District, East Pakistan
- Party: Bangladesh Nationalist Party
- Occupation: Politician, buseinessman

Sultan Salauddin Tuku (born 1 January 1971) is a Bangladeshi politician of the Bangladesh Nationalist Party (BNP). He is the incumbent Jatiya Sangsad member representing the Tangail-5 constituency. He is serving as the Minister of State for Fisheries and Livestock in Tarique ministry. He also served as the minister of state for both Ministry of Agriculture and Ministry of Food from 17 February 2026 to 4 March 2026.
