= Saidur Rahman Khan =

Bangladeshi politician

- Mohon

Member of Bangladesh Parliament
- In office 1988–1991
- Preceded by: Shamsur Rahman Khan Shahjahan
- Succeeded by: Lutfor Rahman Khan Azad

Personal details
- Born: Ghatail
- Party: Jatiya Party (Ershad)

Saidur Rahman Khan is a Jatiya Party (Ershad) politician in Bangladesh and a former member of parliament for Tangail-3.

== Career ==
Khan was elected to parliament from Tangail-3 as a Jatiya Party candidate in 1988.
