= Mir Majedur Rahman =

Bangladeshi politician

Member of Bangladesh Parliament
- In office 1986–1988
- Preceded by: Abdur Rahman
- Succeeded by: Mahmudul Hasan

Personal details
- Party: Jatiya Party (Ershad)

Mir Majedur Rahman is a Jatiya Party (Ershad) politician and a former member of parliament for Tangail-5.

== Career ==
Majedur Rahman was elected to parliament from Tangail-5 as a Jatiya Party candidate in 1988.
