= Lutfor Rahman Khan Matin =

Bangladeshi politician

Members of Parliament
- Incumbent
- Assumed office 17 February 2026
- Preceded by: Abdul Latif Siddiqui
- Constituency: Tangail-4

Personal details
- Party: Bangladesh Nationalist Party
- Occupation: Politician

Lutfor Rahman Khan Matin is a Bangladeshi politician of the Bangladesh Nationalist Party. He was elected as the Member of Parliament for the Tangail-4 constituency in the 2026 Bangladeshi general election held on 12 February 2026.
