= Shahjahanpuri =

Shahjahanpuri (Urdu: شاہجہانپوری) is a surname. Notable people with the surname include:

- Abu Salman Shahjahanpuri (1940–2021), Pakistani scholar
- Dil Shahjahanpuri (1875–1959), Indian writer
- Mahdi Hasan Shahjahanpuri (1882–1976), Indian Islamic scholar

== See also ==
- Shahjahanpur, a city in Uttar Pradesh, India
- Shahjahanpur (disambiguation)
