= Mohammad Matiur Rahman (Tangail politician) =

Bangladeshi politician

Member of Parliament for Tangail-3
- In office 25 January 2009 – 14 September 2012
- Preceded by: Lutfor Rahman Khan Azad
- Succeeded by: Amanur Rahman Khan Rana

Personal details
- Born: 1 November 1947
- Died: 14 September 2012 (aged 64) Bangalore, India
- Party: Bangladesh Awami League
- Education: Mymensingh Medical College

Mohammad Matiur Rahman (1 November 1947 – 14 September 2012) was a cardiac surgeon and Bangladesh Awami League politician. He was a Jatiya Sangsad member representing Tangail-3 constituency.

== Education and career ==
Rahman passed MBBS from Mymensingh Medical College in 1972 and received the PhD from University of Iowa in 1994.

Rahmad served as the director of Labaid Cardiac Hospital in Dhaka.
