= Azahar Ali Sarkar =

Bangladeshi Journalist

- Senior Journalist Azahar Ali Sarkar
- Born: Dinajpur, Bangladesh
- Education: Jagannath University, Dhaka University
- Occupation: Journalist
- Known for: Journalism and politics

Azahar Ali Sarkar (also known as ‘Azhar Ali Sarkar’) (1969–2026) was a Bangladeshi prominent senior journalist, consultant and media adviser. His career expanded over three long decades. He worked for several Bangladeshi newspapers, including Amader Shomoy, Bangladesh Sangbad Sangstha, Daily Sun and Ajker Kagoj, and later worked as a media consultant to the Bashundhara Group. He was associated with the Bangladesh Nationalist Party and served as Acting Secretary General of the Bangladesh Jatiyotabadi Sambadik Forum.

== Early life and education ==
Azahar Ali Sarkar was born in Dinajpur, Bangladesh. He pursued his higher education at Jagannath University, and Dhaka University and BS.C Hons (Physics) before entering the field of journalism.

Mr.Sarkar in his Early Life

== Career ==
Azahar was active in journalism for more than three decades. Over the course of his career, he worked in various roles in various media outlets including journalist, editor, deputy editor, advisor, and media consultant. He worked for several top newspapers and dailies in the country including the national news agency Bangladesh Sangbad Sangstha, Daily Sun, the daily Amader Shomoy and many more.

Azahar Ali Sarkar, media consultant for Bashundhara group

He was associated with journalist organizations such as the Bangladesh Federal Union of Journalists (BFUJ) and the Dhaka Union of Journalists (DUJ). He also served as Acting Secretary General of the Bangladesh Jatiyotabadi Sambadik Forum.

Journalist Azahar Ali Sarkar working as Acting local Mayor in early 90s.

== Political associations ==
Sarkar has been associated with political parties and is considered to be affiliated with the Bangladesh Nationalist Party and had been seen conducting online meetings with party leaders and workers and visiting Begum Khaleda Zia while she was at the ICU. Moreover, Azahar Ali Sarkar was repeatedly invited by both the Awami League & Jatiya Party (Ershad) to contest the national parliamentary elections during their 16 year regime, but he consistently declined.

Azahar Ali Sarkar with Khaleda Zia

== Personal life ==
Sarkar was married to Ruksana Parvin. The couple had two sons, Ainan Azrian Sarkar Arpon and Ainan Razrian Sarkar Archid.

== Detention and death ==
Previously during 1/11 Sarkar was reportedly picked up by DGFI for questioning several times because he was publishing their confidential news to the public. He was again picked up by DGFI on 2015 for questioning later was left stranded on Gulshan area blindfolded by a team with micro. He was picked around 9 times later in 14 years.

On 10 October 2025, Sarkar was arrested from his home in the Banasree area of Rampura, Dhaka, without a warrant, by the Detective Branch, later in connection with an case under the Anti-Terrorism Act, 2009 involving a individual claiming him as an agent of the CIA. The following day, a Dhaka court ordered Sarkar to four days' remand after investigator sought seven days for questioning. According to the prosecution, Sarkar was suspected of conspiring to create public unrest and overthrow the Muhammad Yunus led Interim government and create a military backed government. Sarkar denied involvement, telling the court that he was a senior journalist and had been falsely implicated in the case. While in custody, Sarkar was transferred to Bangladesh Medical University Hospital PG Prison Cell for medical treatment on 29 April 2026. On 17 May 2026, he was granted bail by the High Court Division of the Supreme Court of Bangladesh. He was subsequently granted bail by the High Court Division.

Azahar Ali Sarkar produced before court in a wheelchair

However, His lawyer Senior Barrister Major(retd) Sarwar Hossain said that the High Court Division granted him interim bail on 17 May, but that he was not released after the Attorney General's Office informed the prison authorities that it intended to challenge the order before the Appellate Division. After that he was granted bail and the stay order the state had seek was cancelled by the Appellate Division on 17 June 2026. However, within 10 days in June 2026, the Detective Branch sought to show Sarkar arrested in another Anti-Terrorism Act, 2009 case filed with Shahbagh Police Station in connection with an incident at a discussion on the Bangladesh Liberation War and the Constitution of Bangladesh along with Abdul Latif Siddiqui. His detention was recommended by Inspector Md. Akhter Morshed and state prosecutor Shamsuddoha Suman. Sarkar was at that time still under-going treatment at PG Prison Cell,but he fearlessly demanded to go and was produced before a Dhaka court in a wheelchair on 29 June and was granted bail on health grounds on 17 August by the High Court. His family said that Sarkar was suffering from liver cirrhosis, kidney complications and severe respiratory problems associated with asthma, and that scheduled surgeries in May and June were postponed because of his medical condition wasn't fit enough to undergo those surgeries. He died on 27 September 2026, aged 57, while being taken from Samorita Hospital to Bangladesh Medical University. According to his family, he had suffered from kidney complications for an extended period. He was buried at his family's graveyard in Dinajpur.

== Reaction after death ==
Following the death of Azahar Ali Sarkar, members of the journalism community expressed concern over the circumstances surrounding his prolonged detention and called for accountability. Journalists and media professionals publicly questioned the circumstances that led to his nearly year-long imprisonment and raised concerns regarding allegations that he had been subjected to politically motivated or unfounded cases. The journalism community also called on political leaders and relevant authorities to clarify the basis of the cases brought against Sarkar and raised broader concerns regarding freedom of speech, press freedom, due process, and the protection of fundamental human rights. They also raised questions like "Who is responsible for the death of Azahar Ali Sarkar?" Fabricated Association claims: lack of concrete evidence connecting a Prominent Senior Journalist to high-level counter terrorism conspiracies. During court hearings, Sarkar himself vehemently maintained his innocence, stating he was being unjustly targeted.

In a tribute following Azahar Ali Sarkar’s death, Amar Barta described him as a journalist who had witnessed numerous undisclosed events in Bangladeshi politics and possessed knowledge of many unpublished political developments. The newspaper noted that several chapters of his life and much of what he knew about the country’s political affairs may never be fully known.

The tribute also reflected on his imprisonment, illness and suffering during his final years, describing his death as the loss of a person who carried with him extensive knowledge of the behind-the-scenes workings of Bangladeshi politics.
