= Kader Siddique's insurgency =

Insurgency in Bangladesh (1975–1977)

- Part of Indian influence in Bangladesh
Date	c. November 1975 – July 1977
Location	Bangladesh • Bangladesh–India border
Result	Suppressed

Belligerents
Kader Bahini; Logistic support: India	Bangladesh

Commanders and leaders
Abdul Kader Siddique	Khondaker Mostaq Ahmed; Abu Sadat Mohammad Sayem; Ziaur Rahman

Units involved
N/A	Bangladesh Armed Forces; Bangladesh Police; Bangladesh Rifles

Between 1975 and 1977, Bangladeshi freedom fighter Abdul Kader Siddique fought an insurgency against the Bangladeshi military. The insurgency was launched in reaction to the assassination of Sheikh Mujibur Rahman and was supported by the government of Indira Gandhi. The insurgents, known as Kader Bahini, reportedly clashed with the security forces and occupied territories of Bangladesh. However, following the 1977 Indian general election, the new government of Morarji Desai ended supporting the insurgents and many of them were handed over to the Bangladeshi authorities, ultimately concluding insurgency.

== Insurgency ==
After the assassination of Sheikh Mujibur Rahman in 15 August 1975, Siddique and his followers denounced the authorities of Khondakar Mushtaque's government. Elements loyal to Siddique operated from bases in Assam province in India and were actively supported by India's Border Security Force.

Siddique claimed that his forces had put up an armed resistance against Bangladesh administration from September till October 1975 which led armed clashes at different parts of the country in which 72 of his followers were killed. He also claimed to have occupied some 300 kilometres area along the border stretching from Rangpur to Sylhet with about 9500 insurgents.

During these attacks, 104 rebels were killed and more than 500 were injured. The insurgency lasted more than two years.

== Aftermath ==
In 1977, the Janata Party came to power in India and ended support for his insurgency stating "no shelter shall be given to criminal elements across the border" and promised non-interference in Bangladeshi affairs. Siddique complained that Indian prime minister Morarji Desai handed over 6000 of his fighters to the government of Ziaur Rahman.

Abdul Kader Siddique was tried by a military court on 24 July 1978 and sentenced to 7 years in jail. He was accused of killing a major and a number of soldiers of Bangladesh Army. On 6 December 1990, he returned to Bangladesh from self imposed exile in India.

== See also ==
- 1972–1975 Bangladesh insurgency
