= Kagmari Conference =

1957 conference calling for the independence of East Pakistan

Kagmari Conference was a historic council meeting of Awami League that called for autonomy for East Pakistan and created the path for the Independence of Bangladesh.

== History ==
The Awami League held a cultural conference organized by Yar Mohammad Khan from 6–10 February 1957 in Kagmari, Tangail District, East Pakistan. The conference called for autonomy of East Pakistan. The Awami League activists were unhappy with the decision of Huseyn Shaheed Suhrawardy, leader of Awami League and Prime Minister of Pakistan, to support Pakistan joining the United States backed Central Treaty Organization and Southeast Asia Treaty Organization. Politicians of the Awami League preferred Pakistan follow a neutral foreign policy. The United Front government had won the 1954 Pakistan election with their 21 Point commitments which included a commitment to neutrality in foreign policy.

The opposition to Suhrawardy in the Awami League was led by Abdul Hamid Khan Bhasani. In the meeting Bhasani called for criticized Pakistan joining United States backed military treaties and demanded autonomy for East Pakistan. Suhrawardy support the military pacts and economic policies of Pakistan concerning East Pakistan. Sheikh Mujibur Rahman, general secretary of the Awami League, had joined the cabinet violating article 66 of the constitution of Awami League. Rahman supported the right wing of Awami League led by Suhrawardy. The divisions became solidified between the right and left wing of Awami League. The Bhasani left the Awami League soon after and formed the left-wing National Awami Party.

Sheikh Mujibur Rahman, Yar Mohammad Khan, Maulana Bhashani and Huseyn Shaheed Suhrawardy attending the Afro-Asian Cultural Conference in Kagmari, Tangail (February 1957).
