= Kagmari =

- Mahalla
- Interactive map of Kagmari
- Coordinates: 24.233830°N 89.902426°E
- Country: Bangladesh
- Division: Dhaka Division
- District: Tangail District
- Time zone: UTC+6 (BST)

Kagmari is a mahalla (neighborhood) in the Bangladeshi city of Tangail.

== History ==
The Kagmari pargana was acquired by a pir, Sahajman, during the reign of the Mughal Emperor Shah Jahan (1592-1666). Subsequently, the property passed into the hands of Biswanath Choudhury who established the Santosh zamindari.

== Geography ==
Union Parishads in Tangail Sadar Upazila
U:union parishads, M: mahalla or neighbourhood
Owing to space constraints in the small map, the actual locations in a larger map may vary slightly

Kagmari, near Berabuchina is a part, is situated on the banks of the Louhajang River in a floodplain near the Jamuna River, which contributes to its fertile land. It is located 3 km from Tangail.

== Education ==
Government Maulana Mohammad Ali College was founded by Maulana Abdul Hamid Khan Bhashani in 1957 at Kagmari. It was named after Mohammad Ali Jauhar, a leader of the khilafat movement. It offers honours programme in eleven subjects, degree programmes in science and commerce and the higher secondary course. It has a hostel for 80 students.

== Kagmari Conference ==
Kagmari Conference was organised by the Awami League on 6-10 February 1957 at Kagmari. The main thrust of the conference was on full autonomy for East Pakistan and the non-aligned foreign policy of the Party. The conference turned out to be controversial on certain issues like the support to the Awami League leader Huseyn Suhrawardy then Prime Minister of Pakistan. The ideas of two opposing Awami League leaders Maulana Abdul Hamid Khan Bhashani and Sheikh Mujibur Rahman also came out in the open.
