= Laila Siddiqui =

Bangladeshi politician

Member of Parliament from Tangail-4

Personal details
- Political party: Bangladesh Awami League
- Spouse: Abdul Latif Siddiqui

Laila Siddiqui is a Bangladesh Awami League politician and a former member of parliament for Tangail-4.

== Career ==
Siddiqui was elected to parliament from Tangail-4 in 1988. She was one of the Bangladesh Awami League leaders who received 100 Bangladesh Nationalist Party men in the league in Tangail on 11 January 2007. She sued the government on 11 January 2014, after her husband Abdul Latif Siddiqui was arrested for criticizing Hajj and Tablighi Jamaat in New York City. She argued that cases against her husband were unconstitutional because, for offences committed outside Bangladesh, Bangladeshi law requires permission of the home minister before individuals can be charged.

== Personal life ==
Siddiqui is married to Abdul Latif Siddiqui, former minister and a member of parliament.
