= Abdul Mannan (politician, born 1929) =

Bangladesh politician (1929–2005)

- আব্দুল মান্নান

Minister of Health and Family Planning
- In office 16 March 1973 – 6 November 1975
- Preceded by: Abdul Malek Ukil
- Succeeded by: Muhammad Ghulam Tawab

Minister of Home Affairs
- In office April 1972 – March 1973
- Preceded by: Sheikh Mujibur Rahman
- Succeeded by: Abdul Malek Ukil

Member of the Jatiya Sangsad
- In office 14 July 1996 – 13 July 2001
- Preceded by: Mahmudul Hasan
- Succeeded by: Mahmudul Hasan
- Constituency: Tangail-5
- In office March 1973 – August 1975
- Preceded by: Constituency created
- Succeeded by: Noor Muhammad Khan
- Constituency: Tangail-6

Personal details
- Born: 7 October 1929 Tangail, Bengal, British India
- Died: 5 April 2005 (aged 75) Dhaka, Bangladesh
- Political party: Bangladesh Awami League

Abdul Mannan (7 October 1929 – 5 April 2005) was a Bangladesh Awami League politician and the first Minister of Home Affairs of independent Bangladesh from April 1972 to March 1973.

== Early life ==
He was born in Katuli, Tangail on 7 October 1929. In 1944 he graduated from Bindubasini Government Boys High School. He studied at Karatia Sadat College and graduated from Dhaka University in 1951. He was a professor in Ananda Mohan College and Haraganga College. His later worked as an income tax adviser.

== Career ==
He was involved in Bengali Nationalist movements such as the language movement of 1952, Six point movement, and 1969 uprising in East Pakistan. In 1969 he was president of the Tangail district unit of Awami League in 1969 and the publicity secretary of All Pakistan Awami League. He was one of the representatives of the committee of the Round table conference led by Sheikh Mujibur Rahman In 1970 he was elected to the Pakistan National Assembly. After the election of 1970, He was chosen as the victorious party whip in the parliamentary committee formed by Sheikh Mujibur Rahman. On 17 April 1971, he conducted the oath-taking ceremony of Mujibnagar Government and also took the duty of its spokesman. On 19 April, he took the oath as the Acting minister (Minister-in-charge) of Ministry of Information (Bangladesh). He was the head of the information, broadcasting, and film division of Mujibnagar Government. He was also the chairman of the Board of Editors of the weekly Jai Bangla.

He was made the First Minister of Home Affairs of Bangladesh on 12 January 1972 in the Sheikh Mujib cabinet. In 1973 he was elected to the National Parliament. He was the Minister of Health and Family Planning in the second cabinet. Abdul Mannan was appointed as the Health and Family Planning Minister on 26 January 1975.

In the absence of party president Sheikh Hasina, he discharged his duties as the Acting President of the Awami League. He played a prominent role in protests against the rule of Hussain Muhammad Ershad. He was detained by police before a rally in March 1984, was injured and detained during an anti-government demonstration in July 1987, and was held in custody again from October to December that year.

From 1977 to 1986 he was the Bangladesh Income Tax Lawyers' Association, president. He helped establish Mawlana Bhashani Science and Technology University, and the Wari Club.

He died on 5 April 2005.
