= Anupam Shahjahan Joy =

Bangladeshi politician

- অনুপম শাহজাহান জয়

Member of the Bangladesh Parliament for Tangail-8
- In office 30 January 2024 – 6 August 2024
- Preceded by: Joaherul Islam
- In office 29 March 2014 – 29 January 2019
- Preceded by: Shawkat Momen Shahjahan

Personal details
- Born: 10 April 1985 (age 40)
- Party: Awami League

Anupam Shahjahan Joy (born 10 April 1985) is a Bangladesh Awami League politician and a former Jatiya Sangsad member representing the Tangail-8 constituency.

== Early life ==
Joy's father, Shawkat Momen Shahjahan, was an Awami League politician and a member of parliament.

== Career ==
Joy was elected to parliament from Tangail-8 by-elections on 29 March 2014 as a candidate of the Awami League. The by-elections were called after the death of the incumbent member of parliament for Tangail-8 and Joy's father, Shaukat Momen Shahjahan, on 20 January 2014. The election Commission cancelled the candidature of Kader Siddiqui ahead of the election. He was the youngest elected member of parliament at that time.

In September 2016, two teenage high schoolers were sentenced to two years imprisonment by a mobile court for writing against Joy on Facebook. In October 2016, Bangladesh High Court nullified the sentenced and ordered an inquiry into the allegations that the boys were tortured by Joy, the officer in charge of the local police station, and the Upazila Nirbahi Officer.

On 23 February 2017, Joy was attended the free healthcare camp of the Kidney Awareness Monitoring and Prevention Society which provided free treatment to three thousand patients in his constituency.

In January 2018, a fraction of Bangladesh Chattra League, backed by Joy, rejected the newly formed Sakhipur Upazila Committee and called a strike following which the committee was dissolved. Joy did not receive the Awami League nomination in 2018 which went to Joaherul Islam Joaher.

In January 2024, Anupam Shahjahan Joy has been elected in Tangail-8 constituency in the 12th general election as a candidate of the Awami League.
