= Amanur Rahman Khan Rana =

Bangladeshi politician

- আমানুর রহমান খান রানা

Member of the Bangladesh Parliament for Tangail-3
- In office 10 January 2024 – 6 August 2024
- Preceded by: Ataur Rahman Khan
- Succeeded by: Vacant
- In office 26 November 2012 – 29 January 2019
- Preceded by: Mohammad Matiur Rahman
- Succeeded by: Ataur Rahman Khan

Personal details
- Born: 6 October 1967 (age 58)
- Party: Bangladesh Awami League
- Parent: Ataur Rahman Khan (father)
- Relatives: Shamsur Rahman Khan Shahjahan (uncle)

Amanur Rahman Khan Rana (born 6 October 1967) is a Bangladesh Awami League politician and a former Jatiya Sangsad member representing the Tangail-3 constituency.

== Background and career ==
Rana's uncle, Shamsur Rahman Khan Shahjahan (d. 2012), served as the Jatiya Sangsad member from the Tangail-3 constituency during 1973–1979 and 1986–1988. He brought the two brothers – Rana and Aminur Rahman Khan Bappy – into politics. After the Bangladesh Nationalist Party came to power in 2001, Rana and Bappy, and another brother Shahidur Rahman Khan Mukti were arrested in the anti-crime drive Operation Clean Heart. Bappy was murdered in 2003 and Rana became more involved - he became religious affairs secretary of the district Awami League in 2004 and Shahjahan became the president.

On 18 November 2012, Rana contested as an independent candidate at the Tangail-3 parliamentary election after the death of the then member of parliament, Mohammad Matiur Rahman. He won the election defeating the Awami League candidate Shahidul Islam Lebu and became the new representative on 26 November. Earlier, on 16 November, Awami League presidium member Sheikh Fazlul Karim Selim had announced Rana's expulsion from the party at an election meeting in favour of Lebu at Ghatail High School ground.

Rana again became a lawmaker from the same constituency following the 5 January 2014 election – uncontested and as an Awami League candidate.

== Criminal charges ==
Rana and his three younger brothers have been accused in various cases over allegations including murder, attempted murder, land grabbing and extortion. As of 2016, total 44 cases have been brought against Rana. The charges include two separate killings of a Tangail Chhatra Dal vice-president Abdur Rouf and municipality councillor Rumi Chowdhury in 2004. The two cases were termed "politically motivated" and withdrawn by the Awamu League government in 2013.

=== Faruk murder case ===
On 18 January 2013, a Tangail Awami League politician Faruk Ahmed was shot dead in front of his residence. The family claimed Ahmed was killed because he wanted to contest party elections to get elected as Tangail Awami League's general secretary. In August 2014, police arrested two cohorts of Rana who gave confessional statement before a court. In July 2015, The High Court directed Rana and his brothers to surrender in two weeks and ordered the law enforcers not to harass or arrest them during this period. In November, Supreme Court scrapped that High Court order and revoked the arrest warrant ban for the brothers. In February 2016, Rana and his three brothers Shahidur Rahman Khan Mukti, Jahidur Rahman Khan Kankan and Sanyat Khan Bappa were charged in court for the murder. Arrest warrants were issued against them in April.

On 18 September 2016, Rana surrendered in court ending his fugitive run for 22 months and he was sent to jail after his bail plea was rejected. In September 2017, charges were framed against them. In September, Rana was again denied bail in this case. In March 2019, a High Court bench gave six months' bail to Rana this case.

=== Shamim and Mamun murder case ===
Awami League activists Shamim and Mamun were beaten to death on 16 August 2012. Mamun's father, Abdul Aziz, filed the murder case with a Tangail court in July 2013. Tangail Model Police Station recorded the case in September as per the Tangail court order. Rana was charged following confessional statements made by three other accused.

On 19 June 2019, the High Court granted permanent bail to Rana. A day later, the Supreme Court stayed until 1 July the verdict following a government petition seeking a stay on the High Court judgment. But on 8 July, the Supreme Court upheld the High Court verdict that granted bail to Rana in the murder case and he was released from prison the next day after 34 months of imprisonment.
