= Abdul Latif Siddiqui =

Bangladeshi politician

- আব্দুল লতিফ সিদ্দিকী
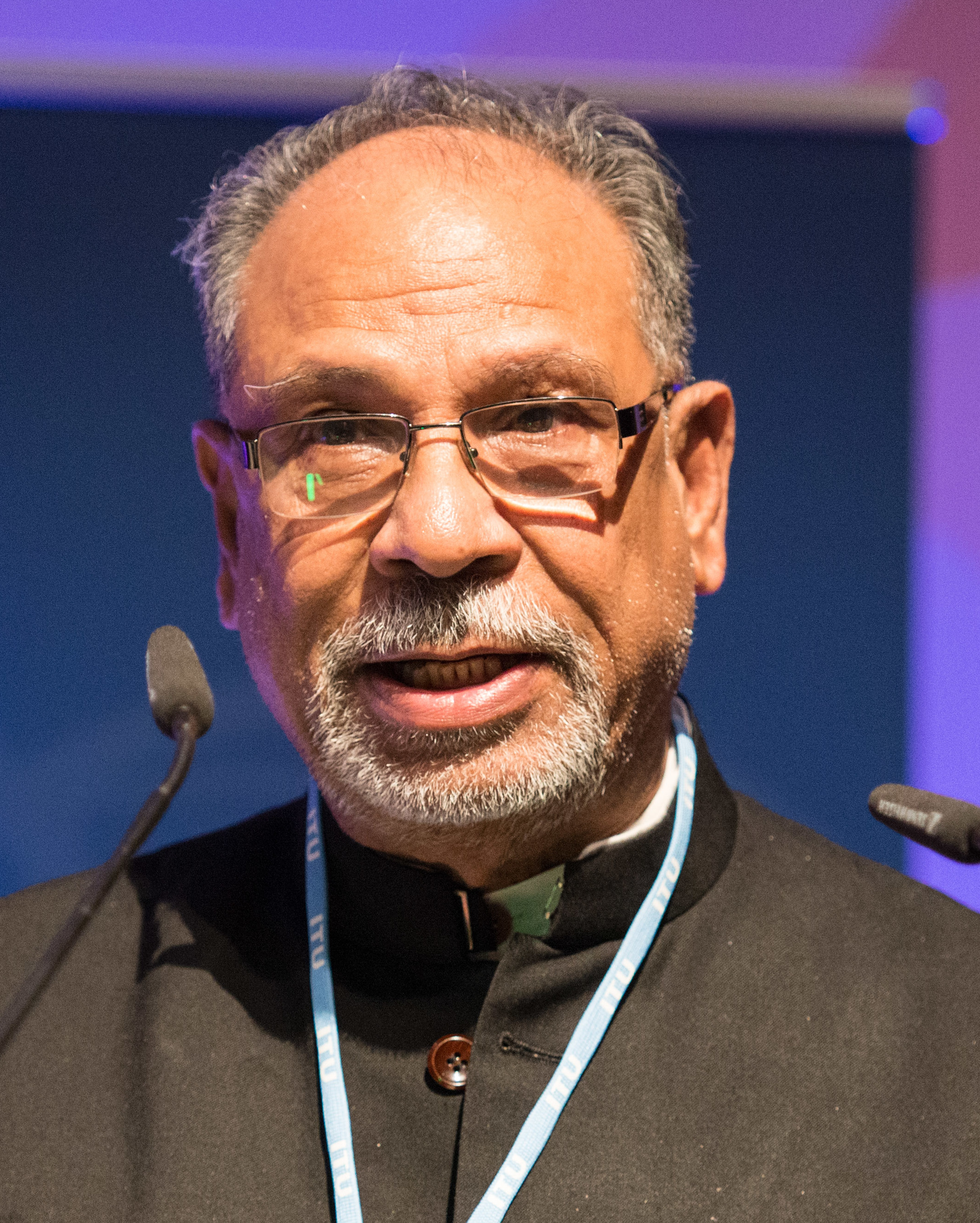
- Siddiqui in 2014

Minister of Posts, Telecommunications and Information Technology
- In office 12 January 2014 – 30 September 2014
- Prime Minister: Sheikh Hasina
- Preceded by: Position Established
- Succeeded by: Tarana Halim

Minister of Textiles and Jute
- In office 6 January 2009 – 24 January 2014
- Prime Minister: Sheikh Hasina
- Succeeded by: Emaz Uddin Pramanik

Member of Parliament for Tangail-4
- In office 10 January 2024 – 6 August 2024
- Preceded by: Hasan Imam Khan
- Succeeded by: Lutfor Rahman Khan Matin
- In office 25 January 2009 – 1 September 2015
- Preceded by: Shajahan Siraj
- Succeeded by: Hasan Imam Khan
- In office 14 July 1996 – 13 July 2001
- Preceded by: Shajahan Siraj
- Succeeded by: Shajahan Siraj

Personal details
- Born: 18 December 1937 (age 88) Mymensingh District, Bengal Province, British India
- Party: Bangladesh Awami League
- Spouse: Laila Siddiqui
- Relatives: Abdul Kader Siddique (brother)

Abdul Latif Siddiqui (born 18 December 1937) is a former Bangladesh Awami League politician. He is a former Jatiya Sangsad member representing the Tangail-4 constituency. He served as the minister of textiles and jute in the second Hasina ministry and the minister of posts, telecommunications and information technology in the third Hasina ministry.

Siddiqui is the elder brother of politician Abdul Kader Siddique.

== Career ==
Siddiqui served as a Jatiya Sangsad member from the Tangail-4 constituency. He resigned on 1 September 2015. He served as the jute and textiles minister from 2009 to 2013. In January 2014, he was appointed as the posts and telecommunications along with information communication technology minister in the 10th cabinet.

In March 2014, Siddiqui was reported by media to have beaten a PDB engineer with a stick, leaving him severely injured.

In September 2014, Siddiqui was widely criticised for his remarks criticising the Muslim pilgrimage, the Hajj, and the Islamic organisation, the Tabligh Jamaat, leading to strong calls for his removal from the cabinet. On 30 September, he was sacked from his ministerial post in the cabinet. He was also expelled from the Awami League. On 22 August 2015, he declared to resign from the Jatiya Sangsad membership.

On 17 October 2018, the Anti-Corruption Commission (ACC) accused Siddiqui of misusing power and damaging government property under the penal code and section 5(2) of the Anti-Corruption Commission Act 1947. On 20 June 2019, a Bogura court denied his bail and ordered him to be jailed. In July 2020, the Supreme Court upheld a High Court order that stayed for six months the trial proceedings.

In January 2021, government-owned land in Tangail illegally occupied by Siddiqui was recovered. It had the market value of 50 crore taka.

He made a comeback in politics after winning the Tangail-4 constituency in the 2024 Bangladeshi general election as an independent candidate.

=== DRU Event ===
During the programme of Moncho 71 at the Dhaka Reporters Unity, a group of people created a commotion and disrupted the event. Siddiqui and several others were taken into police custody following the incident. The organizers, including Siddique, Hafizur Rahman Karzon, Manjurul Alam Panna, and Azahar Ali Sarkar, were charged under the Anti-Terrorism Act, 2009.
