= Shajahan Siraj =

Bangladeshi politician (1943–2020)

Member of Parliament for Tangail-4
- In office 1 October 2001 – 28 October 2006
- Succeeded by: Abdul Latif Siddiqui
- In office 1988–1996
- Preceded by: Laila Siddiqui
- In office 1979–1986
- Preceded by: Abdul Latif Siddiqui

Minister of Environment and Forest
- In office 10 October 2001 – 6 May 2004

Minister of Textiles
- In office 6 May 2004 – 29 October 2006

Personal details
- Born: 1 March 1943 Tangail, Bengal Presidency, British India
- Died: 14 July 2020 (aged 77) Dhaka, Bangladesh
- Party: Bangladesh Nationalist Party
- Other political affiliations: Jatiya Samajtantrik Dal; Jatiya Samajtantrik Dal (Siraj)
- Spouse: Rabeya Siraj
- Occupation: Politician

Shajahan Siraj (1 March 1943 – 14 July 2020) was a Bangladeshi politician who served as the vice chairman of the Bangladesh Nationalist Party (BNP). As a student, he was involved with the Bangladesh Liberation War. He was one of the founders of Jatiya Samajtantrik Dal. He was a member of Jatiya Sangsad representing the Tangail-4 constituency.

== Early life ==
Siraj attended Government Saadat College, where he was twice elected vice president of the student council. He served as the general secretary of the Bangladesh Chhatra League, the student organization of the Awami League, from 1970 to 1972. He was a leader of the Mukti Bahini and one of the leaders of Bangladesh liberation. Siraj was one of the designers of the Bangladesh flag. Siraj read the manifesto of Bangladesh independence on 3 March 1971, in front of millions of people in the presence of Sheikh Mujibur Rahman. He served as the acting General Secretary and also the president of Jatiya Samajtantrik Dal (JSD).

== Career ==
Siraj won election to parliament five times from Tangail-4 constituency. He served as a minister, for the Government of Bangladesh, during 1991 and 2001 BNP's tenure. During his tenure as the environment minister, the use and production of plastic shopping bags (polythene bags) were banned in Bangladesh, 3-stroke scooters were withdrawn from the road, and social tree plantation turned into a movement.

In 2007, arrest warrants were issued for Siraj in connection with thirteen charges of tax evasion. He was sentenced to thirteen years in jail, and his wife three. That conviction was overturned in 2010.

== Personal life ==
Siraj was married to Rabeya Siraj, a women's movement leader, president of the BNP's Dhaka city women's front, and a member of the BNP national executive committee. Together they have a daughter, Sarwat Siraj, and, Rajiv Siraj, a son. Sarwat is a practising advocate at the Bangladesh Supreme Court. Rajiv is a member of board of directors of One Group.

=== Death ===
Siraj died on 14 July 2020 at a hospital in Dhaka after suffering from cancer.
