= Ataur Rahman Khan (Tangail politician) =

Bangladeshi politician

- আতাউর রহমান খান
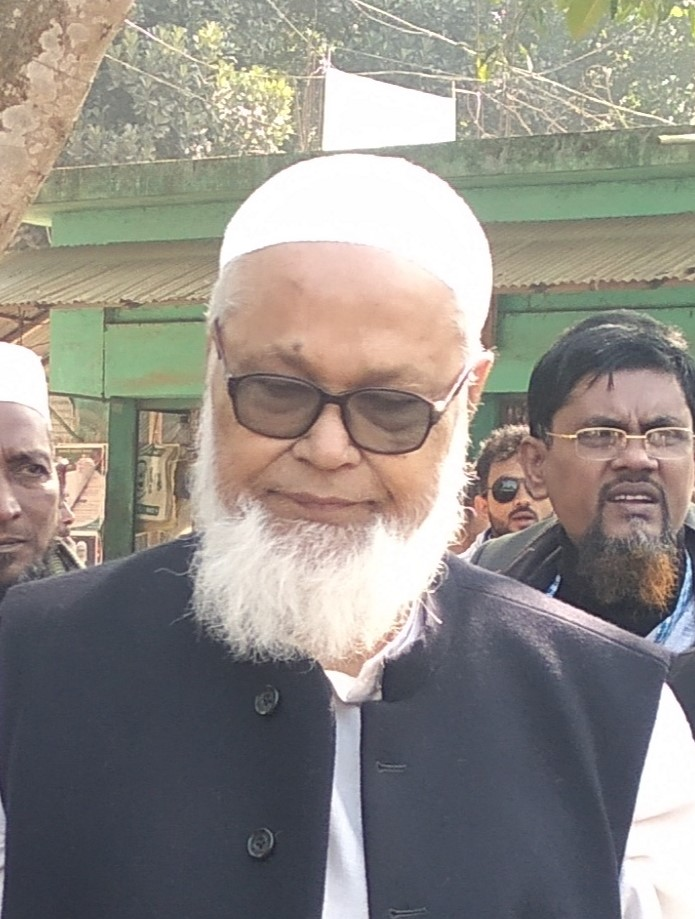

Member of Parliament
- In office 30 January 2019 – 29 January 2024
- Preceded by: Amanur Rahman Khan Rana
- Succeeded by: Amanur Rahman Khan Rana
- Constituency: Tangail-3

Personal details
- Party: Bangladesh Awami League
- Children: 5, including Amanur Rahman Khan Rana
- Relatives: Shamsur Rahman Khan Shahjahan (brother)

Ataur Rahman Khan is a Bangladesh Awami League politician and former Jatiya Sangsad member from the Tangail-3 constituency. His brother, Shamsur Rahman Khan Shahjahan, and his son, Amanur Rahman Khan Rana, were members from the same constituency.

== Career ==
Khan was elected to parliament from Tangail-3 as a Bangladesh Awami League candidate on 30 December 2018.
