= Government Maulana Mohammad Ali College =

Coordinates: 24.2343°N 89.9019°E

- Kagmari, Tangail Sadar, Bangladesh

Information
- School type: Masters college
- Established: 1957
- Founder: Maulana Abdul Hamid Khan Bhashani
- School code: 114744
- Language: Bengali
- Affiliation: National University
- Website: govmmalicollege.edu.bd

Government Maulana Mohammad Ali College also known as Government M. M. Ali College, is a public undergraduate institution in Tangail, Bangladesh. It was established on July 1, 1957, in Kagmari by Maulana Abdul Hamid Khan Bhasani. The college is named after his political mentor, Mohammad Ali Jouhar, a renowned leader of the Indian subcontinent and a key figure in the Khilafat Movement. On February 1, 1975, Sheikh Mujibur Rahman nationalized the college.

== History ==
Government Maulana Mohammad Ali College was established in 1957 by Maulana Abdul Hamid Khan Bhasani and was named after Mohammad Ali Jouhar, an important leader of the Khilafat movement of British India. The school was initially located at a used government office. In 1958, in the aftermath of the Bengali language movement, a martyr's memorial was erected on campus. During the 1969 East Pakistan mass uprising one student was killed and ten were injured on 4 February when the East Pakistan Rifles opened fire on a demonstration.

== Educational facilities ==
Here are the following sections:

- Faculty of Arts: Bengali, English, History, Islamic History and Culture, Philosophy, Islamic Studies.
- Faculty of Social Sciences: Political Science, Sociology, Economics.
- Faculty of Business Education: Accounting, Management.
- Faculty of Science: Physics, Chemistry, Zoology, Botany, Mathematics.

Also Higher Secondary Certificate (HSC) available in this college.

== Notable people ==
- Rafiq Azad began his career teaching Bengali at the college from 1968 to 1972.
