= Abul Kashem (Tangail politician) =

Bangladeshi politician (1941/1942–2024)

- আবুল কাসেম

Member of Bangladesh Parliament

Personal details
- Born: 1941/1942
- Died: 15 March 2024 (aged 82) Tangail, Bangladesh
- Party: Jatiya Party (Ershad)

Abul Kashem (1941/1942 – 15 March 2024) was a Bangladeshi Jatiya Party (Ershad) politician and a member of parliament for Tangail-5.

== Life and career ==
Abul Kashem was elected to parliament from Tangail-5 as a Jatiya Party candidate in 2008. His parliamentary membership was cancelled in 2009 for being a loan defaulter.

Abul Kashem died from respiratory failure on 15 March 2024, at the age of 82.
