= Shajahan Madampat =

Indian writer, critic, and social commentator

Shajahan Madampat is an Indian writer, critic and social commentator based in Middle East who writes on issues related to culture, media and Middle East affairs in, The Outlook Magazine, and Malayalam weekly magazines Kalakaumudi and Mathrubhumi. He graduated from Jamal Mohamed college, Trichy before higher studies from Jawaharlal Nehru University. He worked with United States Information Service, for the National Library of Congress documenting the voices of Indian writers before quitting to devote full-time for writing and journalism. He is currently working in UAE. He has published a memoir of life at Jawaharlal Nehru University, New Delhi, titled JNU vile Chivarchitrangal in Malayalam.

== Family ==
Shajahan born to Hassan Madani and Khadeeja. He married journalist Leena Khoshy. They have one daughter Farasha.

== Books by Shajahan Madampat ==
JNU vile Chivarchitrangal JNU vile Chivarchitrangal in Malayalam language
