= Md. Sanowar Hossain =

Bangladeshi politician

- মোঃ ছানোয়ার হোসেন

Member of the Bangladesh Parliament for Tangail-5
- In office 29 January 2014 – 6 August 2024
- Preceded by: Mahmudul Hasan

Personal details
- Political party: Bangladesh Awami League

Md. Sanowar Hossain is a Bangladesh Awami League politician and a former Jatiya Sangsad member representing the Tangail-5 constituency.

== Early life ==
Hossain was born on 1 February 1970. He has a B.A. degree.

== Career ==
Hossain was elected to Parliament from Tangail-5 as a candidate of the Awami League in 2014. The election was boycotted by the opposition Bangladesh Nationalist Party.

Hossain was re-elected to Parliament from Tangail-5 as a candidate of the Awami League in 2018. He received 149,362 votes while his closest rival, Mahmudul Hasan of the Bangladesh Nationalist Party, received 78,992 votes.

Hossain was elected to parliament from Tangail-5 as an Awami League candidate on 7 January 2024.
