= Abdul Kader Siddique =

Bangladeshi politician and fighter

Bangabir Abdul Kader Siddique Bir Uttom
- বঙ্গবীর আব্দুল কাদের সিদ্দিকী
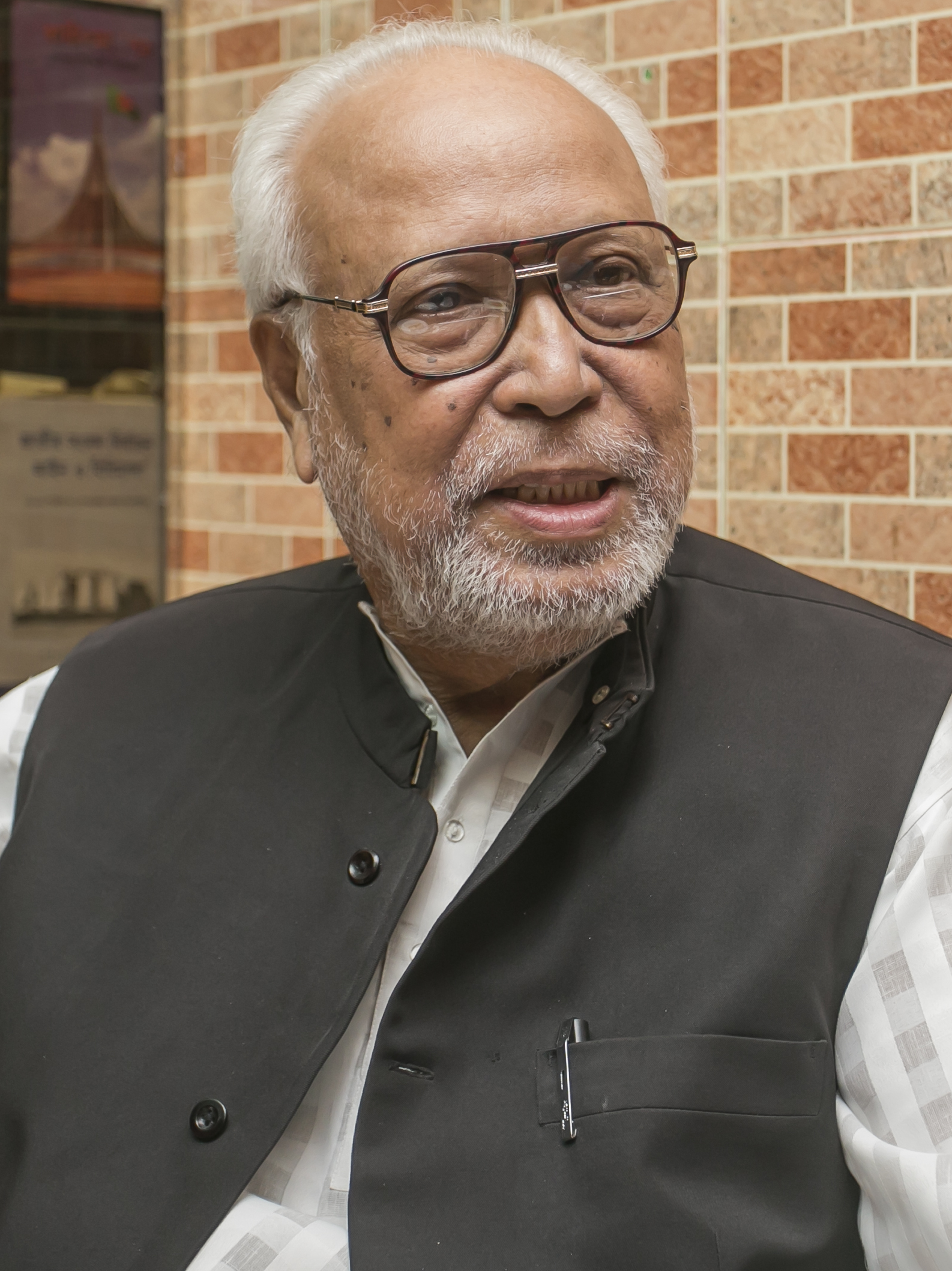
- Siddique in 2017

Member of the Bangladesh Parliament for Tangail-8
- In office 14 July 1996 – 1999
- Preceded by: Humayun Khan Panni
- Succeeded by: Shawkat Momen Shahjahan
- In office 28 October 2001 – 27 October 2006
- Preceded by: Shawkat Momen Shahjahan
- Succeeded by: Shawkat Momen Shahjahan

Personal details
- Born: 14 June 1947 (age 79) Tangail, Bengal Presidency, British India
- Party: Krishak Sramik Janata League
- Other political affiliations: Bangladesh Awami League
- Spouse: Nasrin Siddique (m. 1984; died 2025)
- Children: 2
- Relatives: Abdul Latif Siddiqui (brother)
- Education: Government Maulana Mohammad Ali College
- Awards: Bir Uttom

Military service
- Allegiance: Pakistan (1966–1967); Bangladesh (1971–1972)
- Branch/service: Pakistan Army; Mukti Bahini
- Unit: East Bengal Regiment; Kaderia Force
- Commands: Commander-in-Chief of Kaderia Force
- Battles/wars: Bangladesh Liberation War; 1972–1975 Bangladesh insurgency

Bangabir Abdul Kader Siddique (Note: Bengali: আবদুল কাদের সিদ্দিকী) is a Bangladeshi politician and warlord. He served as a Mukti Bahini commander, and organizer of the Bangladesh War of Independence. He fought with an estimated 17,000-strong guerrilla force in the Tangail region against the Pakistan Army. The army was called Kaderia Bahini (Kader's Army). At the end of the war in 1971, Siddique's forces entered Dhaka along with the Indian forces, signaling the end of the war. He was awarded Bir Uttom by the government of Bangladesh. Since 1999, he has been serving as the leader of his newly formed party, the Krishak Sramik Janata League.

== Early life and education ==
Abdul Kader Siddique's ancestral home is located in the village of Chhatihati, within the Kalihati Upazila of Tangail District. He was born to Abdul Ali Siddique and Latifa Siddique. Siddique received his primary education at his local village school and the Tangail PTI Training School. He completed his secondary education at Shibnath High School and Vivekananda High School. He later attended Government Maulana Mohammad Ali College in Kagmari for his higher secondary and undergraduate studies. Although he studied at M.M. Ali College, his student political activities were primarily centered around Government Saadat College in Karatia Union.

== Military career ==
=== East Bengal Regiment ===
While still a student, he enlisted in the East Bengal Regiment of the Pakistan Army. Following the completion of his training and a brief period of service, he resigned from the military in 1967 to resume his formal education.

=== Bangladesh Liberation War ===
During the Bangladesh Liberation War, he formed the Kaderia Force and fought against the Pakistani military. The Kaderia Force, as it is said, had approximately 17 thousand personnel. He was loyal to Sheikh Mujibur Rahman.

== Political career ==
=== After independence ===
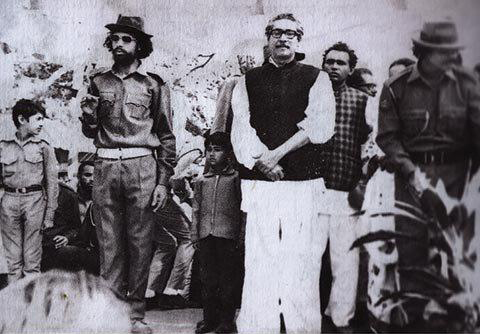
Siddique (left) with Sheikh Mujibur Rahman (centre) in 1972

After the independence of Bangladesh, Siddique went back to his hometown of Tangail, where he enjoyed considerable patronage from the Awami League, the party of Prime Minister Mujibur Rahman.

=== Insurgency against Khondakar Mushtaq and Ziaur Rahman ===
After the assassination of Sheikh Mujibur Rahman in 1975, Siddiqui and his followers organised attacks on the authorities of Khondakar Mushtaque's government. Elements loyal to Siddiqui operated from bases in Assam province in India and were actively supported by India's Border Security Force. In the insurgency against the government of Ziaur Rahman, 104 rebels were killed and more than 500 were injured. The insurgency lasted more than two years. In 1976, the Janata Party government ended its support for him, stating, "no shelter shall be given to criminal elements across the border" and promised non-interference in Bangladeshi affairs.

He was tried by a military court on 24 July 1978 and sentenced to 7 years in jail. He was accused of killing a major and a number of soldiers of the Bangladesh Army. On 6 December 1990, he returned to Bangladesh from self-imposed exile in India.

=== Post-exiled life ===
Siddique was elected member of the parliament of Bangladesh from different constituencies of Tangail.

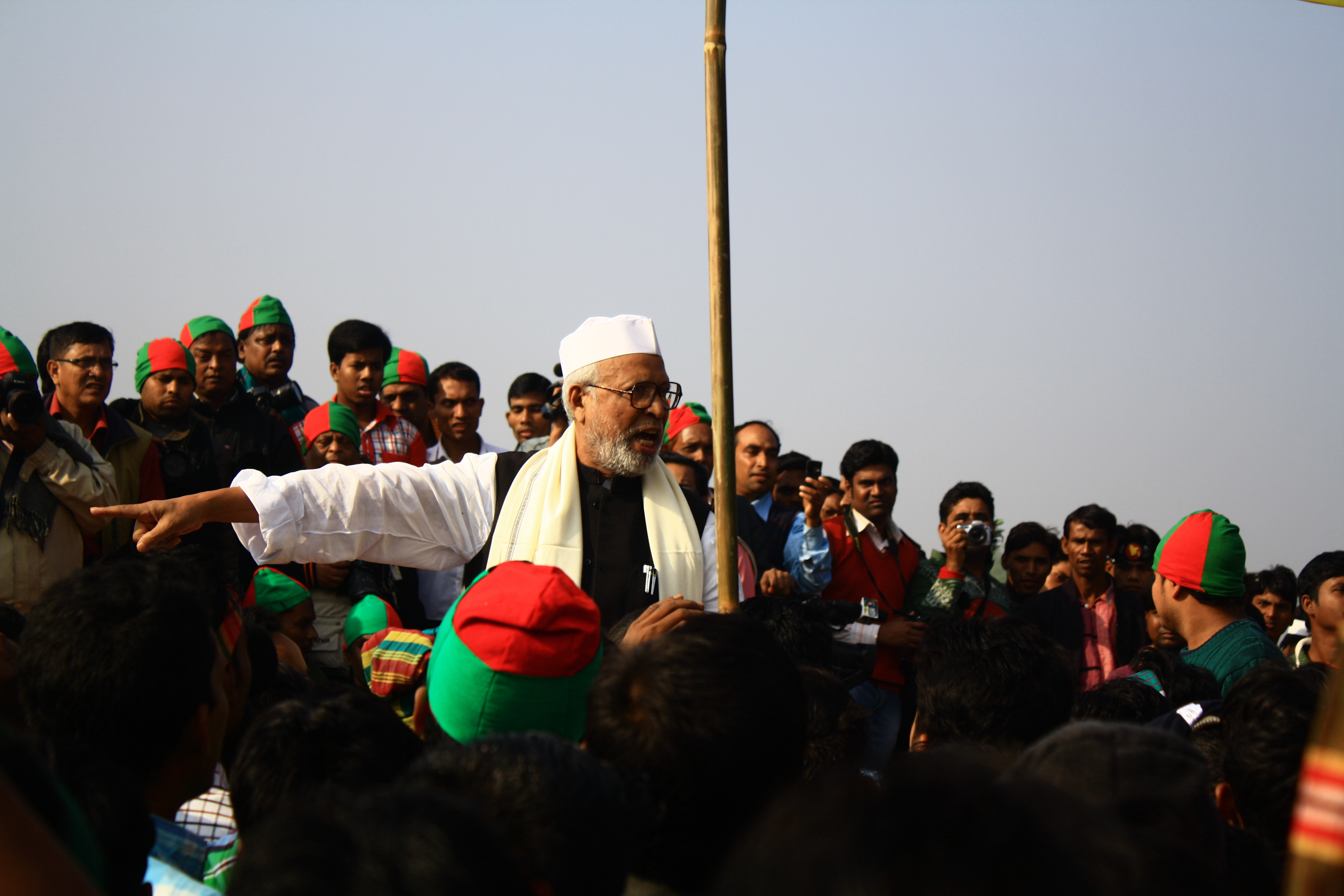
Siddique at the National Martyrs' Memorial

In 1996, Siddique was elected to Parliament as a Bangladesh Awami League candidate from Tangail-8. In 1999, Siddique quit Awami League. He then resigned from the parliament and formed his own party, the Krishak Sramik Janata League. This triggered a by-election, which he lost to the Bangladesh Awami League candidate, Shawakat Momen Shahjahan. Siddique was elected to parliament from Tangail 8 in the 2001 Bangladesh general election as a candidate of the Krishak Sramik Janata League. On 17 October 2006, his rally was attacked by Bangladesh Chhatra League activists, leaving 11 injured in Jamalpur District.

In 2017, the Bangladesh High Court disqualified Siddique from contesting a by-election from Tangail-4 because he had defaulted on a loan. He tried to contest the 2018 Bangladeshi general election from Tangail-4 and Tangail-8, but his candidacy was rejected by the Bangladesh Election Commission. He, along with his party, joined the Jatiya Oikyafront to contest the election against the Bangladesh Awami League alliance. His daughter, Kuri Siddique, also applied for nomination from Tangail-8 in case his candidacy was rejected. The Election Commission rejected the appeal filed by Siddique, challenging the cancellation of his nomination on 8 December.

In the controversial 2024 election, he lost the constituency of Tangail-8 to Awami League candidate Anupam Shahjahan Joy.

=== Krishak Sramik Janata League ===
He is currently the president of the Krishak Sramik Janata League. On 8 November 2018, he joined the Jatiya Oikyafront under the leadership of Kamal Hossain to participate in the 11th National Parliament election in an alliance. The main partner of the Oikyafront was the Bangladesh Nationalist Party. Through this alliance, his party and he participated in the national election under the symbol of a sheaf of rice.

== Personal life ==
Siddique is married to Nasrin Siddique. His elder brother, Abdul Latif Siddiqui, is also an Awami League politician who served as the member of parliament and the minister of Posts, Telecommunications and Information Technology. Their other two younger brothers are Murad Siddiqui and Azad Siddiqui. He has been widely discussed and criticized for writing newspaper columns. In 2013, he regularly wrote columns in the daily Amar Desh and the daily Naya Diganta. In addition, he discussed the country's ongoing political, social, and contemporary issues as a presenter on Diganta Television. He was criticised for these media roles by his brother Abdul Latif Siddiqui as "arrogant" and "new-Razakar."

=== Notable books written by Quader Siddiquie ===
- Maulana Bhashani Ke Jemon Dekhechi
- Meghe Dhaka Tara
- Swadhinata'71
- Bajrakathon
- Tara Amar Boro Bhai-Bon
- Na Bola Kotha
- Pita-Putra
