= Mirza Tofazzal Hossain Mukul =

Bangladeshi politician

Member of Bangladesh Parliament

Personal details
- Political party: Bangladesh Awami League

Mirza Tofazzal Hossain Mukul was a Bangladesh Awami League politician and a member of parliament for Tangail-5.

== Career ==
Mukul was elected to parliament from Tangail-5 as a Bangladesh Awami League candidate in 1973. He was the former president of the Tangail District unit of the Bangladesh Awami League and the Tangail District Bar Association.

== Death and legacy ==
Mukul died on 5 April 2016 in Bangabandhu Sheikh Mujib Medical University Hospital, Dhaka, Bangladesh. His son in law, Abdur Rahman, is the member of parliament from Faridpur-1.

On 22 January 2022, Mukul was awarded the Ekushey Padak, the second most important award for civilians in Bangladesh.
