= Shawkat Momen Shahjahan =

Bangladeshi politician

- শওকত মোমেন শাহজাহান

Member of Bangladesh Parliament
- In office 25 January 2009 – 20 January 2014
- Preceded by: Abdul Kader Siddique
- Succeeded by: Anupam Shahjahan
- Constituency: Tangail-8
- In office 1999–2001
- Preceded by: Abdul Kader Siddique
- Succeeded by: Abdul Kader Siddique
- Constituency: Tangail-8
- In office 1986–1988
- Preceded by: Morshed Ali Khan Panni
- Succeeded by: Morshed Ali Khan Panni
- Constituency: Tangail-8

Personal details
- Born: 1951 Sakhipur, Tangail, Bangladesh
- Died: 20 January 2014 (aged 62–63)
- Party: Bangladesh Awami League
- Children: Anupam Shahjahan Joy

Shawkat Momen Shahjahan was a Bangladesh Awami League politician and a Member of Parliament.

== Early life ==
Shajahan was born in 1951. He studied at the Bangladesh Agriculture University in Mymensingh. He worked as a lecturer in Bangladesh Agriculture University after graduating. Later he married Shobnam Momtaz, and had a child, Anupam Shahjahan Joy, the current MP of Tangail-8.

== Career ==
Shahjahan was elected to Parliament in 1986 Tangail-8 as a Bangladesh Awami League candidate. He won the by-poll in 1999 from Tangail-8 and was re-elected again in December 2008 General elections. He served as the Chairman of the Parliamentary Standing Committee for Agriculture Ministry. He was elected unopposed in the 10th parliamentary election on 5 January 2014. He has called on the government of Bangladesh to implement the Chittagong Hill Tracts Peace Accord to avert violence in the Chittagong Hill Tracts region.

== Death and legacy ==
Shahjahan died on 20 January 2014. His constituency, Tangail-8, fail vacant after his death. On 29 March 2014, by-elections were held and his son, Anupam Shahjahan Joy, was elected to Parliament.
