= Jatiya Samajtantrik Dal (Siraj) =

Bangladeshi political party

Jatiya Samajtantrik Dal (Siraj) জাতীয় সমাজতান্ত্রিক দল (সিরাজ)
- Founder: Shajahan Siraj
- Split from: JSD (Rab)
- Merged into: BNP
- Ideology: Socialism

Jatiya Samajtantrik Dal (Siraj) was a socialist political party in Bangladesh.

== History ==
Jatiya Samajtantrik Dal was established in 1972 following a split in Bangladesh Chhatra League. The party split twice during the term of President Ziaur Rahman. It split again during the rule of President Hussain Muhammad Ershad, forming Jatiya Samajtantrik Dal-JSD, led by A. S. M. Abdur Rab, and Jatiya Samajtantrik Dal (Siraj), led by Shajahan Siraj. The party later merged with the Bangladesh Nationalist Party.
