= Shamsur Rahman Khan Shahjahan =

Bangladeshi politician

Member of Parliament for Tangail-3
- In office 7 April 1973 – 6 November 1975
- Preceded by: Position established
- Succeeded by: Sawkat Ali Bhuiyan
- In office 10 July 1986 – 6 December 1987
- Succeeded by: Saidur Rahman Khan

Personal details
- Died: 2 January 2012 (aged 80) Tangail District, Bangladesh
- Political party: Bangladesh Awami League

Shamsur Rahman Khan Shahjahan (died 2 January 2012) was a Bangladesh Awami League politician and the former Jatiya Sangsad member from Tangail-3 constituency.

== Career ==
Shahjahan fought in the Bangladesh Liberation war in Tangail district as a member of the Mukti Bahini. He was elected to parliament from Tangail-3. He was the President of Tangail district unit of Bangladesh Awami League.

== Death ==
Shahjahan died on 2 January 2012. His nephew Amanur Rahman Khan Rana and brother Ataur Rahman Khan elected to parliament from his constituency.
